= Corleone (disambiguation) =

Corleone is a Sicilian town.

Corleone may also refer to:

- Corleone family, a fictional family from Sicily that settled in New York. The family was created by Mario Puzo and appears in his 1969 novel The Godfather, as well as its film adaptations
  - First generation:
    - Vito Corleone, patriarch and original boss of the Corleone crime family
    - Carmela Corleone, wife of Vito
  - Second generation:
    - Sonny Corleone, oldest son
    - Fredo Corleone, middle son
    - Michael Corleone, youngest son and Vito's eventual successor as boss
    - Connie Corleone, daughter
  - Third generation:
    - Anthony Corleone, son of Michael
    - Mary Corleone, daughter of Michael
    - Vincent Corleone, son of Sonny and eventual successor to Michael as boss
- Corleonesi Mafia clan, a faction within the Sicilian Mafia
- Corleone: A Tale of Sicily (novel), an 1897 novel by Francis Marion Crawford about a family of brigands or maffeusi
- Corleone (album), a 2014 album by French rapper Lacrim, or the title track
- Corleone (film), 1978 Italian film
- Il Capo dei Capi, 2007 Italian TV series, released in Great Britain as "Corleone"
- Dontay Corleone (born 2003), American football defensive lineman
