= Mary Corleone =

Fictional character from The Godfather series

- Sofia Coppola portraying Mary Corleone
- First appearance: The Godfather Part II
- Last appearance: The Godfather Part III
- Created by: Mario Puzo
- Portrayed by: Sofia Coppola

In-universe information
- Gender: Female
- Family: Corleone family
- Relatives: Michael Corleone (father); Kay Adams Corleone (mother); Anthony Corleone (brother); Vito Corleone (paternal grandfather; deceased); Carmela Corleone (paternal grandmother; deceased); Sonny Corleone (paternal uncle; deceased); Fredo Corleone (paternal uncle; deceased); Vincent Mancini-Corleone (paternal cousin and lover); Connie Corleone (paternal aunt); Carlo Rizzi (uncle; deceased)

Mary Corleone is a fictional character in The Godfather Part III, portrayed by Sofia Coppola. She is the daughter of Michael Corleone and Kay Adams and sister of Anthony Corleone.

== The Godfather Part II ==
Mary first appears in The Godfather Part II as the younger child of Michael and Kay. She is a young child (aged about 4 or 5) in the late 1950s. Like her brother Anthony, Mary does not have a significant role or story arc in the film.

== The Godfather Part III ==
Mary is sheltered from the violent world of the Corleone crime family. She falls in love with her cousin, Vincent Mancini, Sonny Corleone's illegitimate son. While the family is traveling in Sicily, Michael tells Mary he disapproves of the romance, believing that Vincent's growing involvement in the "family business" puts her life in danger. He fears that Mary could suffer the same fate as his first wife, Apollonia, who was killed by a car bomb intended for him 30 years earlier.

Toward the end of the film, Michael names Vincent as his successor, on condition that he break off his relationship with Mary. After her brother's debut concert, the assassin Mosca tries to kill Michael. One bullet grazes Michael's shoulder, but the other accidentally hits Mary in the chest, fatally wounding her. Michael is devastated by Mary's death, and screams in torment while cradling her dead body.

=== Casting ===
Director Francis Ford Coppola cast his daughter Sofia as Mary after several actresses dropped out: Winona Ryder left due to experiencing nervous exhaustion after filming Welcome Home, Roxy Carmichael (1990) and Mermaids (1990) back-to-back and did not want to give a substandard performance, Julia Roberts left due to scheduling conflicts after she had already cast in Pretty Woman, and Madonna was deemed too old for the part by some. Rebecca Schaeffer had also pursued the role where she was due to meet with Coppola on the day of her scheduled audition, but was murdered by an obsessed fan even before filming started.

It has been suggested that the situation further damaged Coppola's career and ruined Sofia's before it had even begun. Sofia, who later became a critically acclaimed filmmaker, said that she never really wanted to act and only appeared in the film as a favor to her father. She reiterated after filming that she did not want to be an actress. It has also been suggested that her role in the film contributed to its box office performance, which started strongly and then went into decline. She said that her father based a lot of her character on her while writing the script, before she was even cast in the role. She worried that she had only been given the role because she was his daughter, which placed a strain on her during shooting that her mother observed in a series of diaries she wrote for Vogue during production. After she was critically panned for her performance in the film, for which she won Worst Supporting Actress and Worst New Star at the 1990 Golden Raspberry Awards, Sofia ended her acting career. She said that she was not hurt by the criticism because she never wanted an acting career.

== Sequel novels ==
Mary appears as a minor character in Mark Winegardner's sequel novels The Godfather Returns and The Godfather's Revenge, although in the original novel, Michael's second child is a boy.

== Family ==
- Michael Corleone—Father; played by Al Pacino
- Kay Adams—Mother; played by Diane Keaton
- Anthony Corleone—Brother; played by Anthony Gounaris in Godfather I, played by James Gounaris in Godfather II, played by Franc D'Ambrosio in Godfather III
- Vito Corleone—Grandfather; played by Marlon Brando and Robert De Niro
- Carmela Corleone—Grandmother; played by Morgana King and Francesca De Sapio
- Santino 'Sonny' Corleone—Uncle; played by James Caan
- Fredo Corleone—Uncle; played by John Cazale
- Constanzia "Connie" Corleone-Rizzi—Aunt; played by Talia Shire
- Vincent Mancini-Corleone—First cousin; son of Sonny Corleone played by Andy García
- Frank Corleone—Cousin; son of Sonny Corleone
- Kathryn & Francesca Corleone—Cousins; Sonny's twin daughters
- Santino Corleone Jr.—Cousin; son of Sonny Corleone
