= Sonny Corleone =

Fictional character from The Godfather series

- The Godfather character
- James Caan as Sonny Corleone in The Godfather
- First appearance: The Godfather
- Last appearance: The Godfather: The Game
- Created by: Mario Puzo
- Portrayed by: James Caan; Roman Coppola (child)

In-universe information
- Full name: Santino Corleone
- Nickname: Sonny
- Title(s): Underboss, acting boss
- Occupation: Mafia boss
- Family: Corleone family
- Spouse: Sandra Corleone
- Children: Francesca Corleone; Kathryn Corleone; Frank Corleone; Santino Corleone Jr. Vincent Mancini
- Relatives: Carlo Rizzi (brother-in-law); Apollonia Vitelli-Corleone (sister-in-law); Kay Adams Corleone (sister-in-law); Deanna Dunn (sister-in-law); Victor Rizzi (nephew); Michael Rizzi (nephew); Anthony Corleone (nephew); Mary Corleone (niece)
- Father: Vito Corleone
- Mother: Carmela Corleone
- Brothers: Fredo Corleone; Michael Corleone; Tom Hagen (adopted brother)
- Sisters: Connie Corleone

Santino "Sonny" Corleone is a fictional character in Mario Puzo's 1969 novel The Godfather and its 1972 film adaptation.

He is the eldest son of the mafia boss don Vito Corleone and Carmela Corleone. He has two brothers, Fredo and Michael, and a sister, Connie. In the film, Sonny was portrayed by James Caan, who briefly reprised his role for a flashback scene in The Godfather Part II.

Director Francis Ford Coppola's son Roman Coppola played Sonny as a boy in the 1920s scenes of The Godfather Part II.

== Novel and film biography ==
In both the novel and the film, Sonny is the eldest of Vito Corleone's four children. Unlike his quiet, level-headed father, Sonny is hot-tempered and prone to violence.

At age 16, Sonny commits a robbery. When Peter Clemenza, one of Vito's caporegimes and Sonny's godfather, informs Vito about it, Vito demands his son explain himself. Sonny replies that he had witnessed Vito murder the "Black Hand" gangster Don Fanucci years before, and he now wants to "learn how to sell olive oil". Vito knows what Sonny really means, and sends him to Clemenza for training.

Sonny "makes his bones" at age 19. By his mid-20s, he becomes a capo in the Corleone family alongside Clemenza and Sal Tessio. By the end of World War II, he is his father's heir apparent and de facto underboss, popular and feared as a merciless killer with a short temper. Sonny is not without a sensitive side, however; at age 11, he brings home a homeless boy, Tom Hagen, demanding he be allowed to live with the family. Vito informally adopts Hagen, who eventually rises through the ranks to become Vito's consigliere. As the eldest child, Sonny acts as protector to his younger siblings and has a soft-spot for his youngest brother, Michael. Although he can beat up and kill other men without hesitation, he cannot bring himself to harm women, children, or anyone unable to defend themselves.

Sonny has four children with his wife Sandra. He also has several mistresses, including his sister Connie's friend Lucy Mancini. In the novel, Sandra allows – and is grateful for – his infidelities because she is unable to take the size of his penis.

Sonny's life is upturned in 1945, when drug lord Virgil "The Turk" Sollozzo, backed by the Tattaglia family, approaches Vito with an offer to enter the narcotics trade. During the meeting, Sonny speaks out of turn, expressing an interest in the deal that Vito declines. Vito later castigates Sonny for revealing his thoughts to an outsider. Sollozzo later attempts to have Vito assassinated, believing Sonny, as his father's successor, will bring the Corleone family into the drug trade.

The failed assassination attempt leaves Vito near death, making Sonny acting boss of the Corleone family. Sonny orders Clemenza to execute Vito's bodyguard Paulie Gatto for setting up Vito to be ambushed. Sollozzo mounts a second assassination attempt on Vito at the hospital, which Michael prevents. Sonny then orders Bruno Tattaglia, son and underboss of Sollozzo's ally Philip Tattaglia, to be murdered. Sollozzo proposes that Michael be sent to promote a truce. Sonny, believing it is a trick, refuses and demands that the other Mafia families hand over Sollozzo to the Corleone family or face war. Hagen successfully persuades Sonny to wait, because Captain Mark McCluskey, a corrupt NYPD captain on Sollozzo's payroll, has agreed to be Sollozzo's bodyguard. Hagen warns Sonny that killing McCluskey would violate a longstanding Mafia rule not to kill members of law enforcement, and that the backlash from rival Mafia families and law enforcement would be severe.

Michael, who had before wanted nothing to do with the family business, volunteers to kill Sollozzo and McCluskey, arguing that McCluskey is a corrupt cop mixed up in the drug trade. More importantly, Michael argues that since McCluskey is serving as Sollozzo's bodyguard, he has crossed into their world and is fair game. Sonny is impressed with Michael's confidence and seriousness, but doubts that his "nice college boy" brother is capable of murder. Ultimately, however, he approves the hit. Michael meets with Sollozzo and McCluskey at an Italian restaurant in the Bronx and kills both men. This ignites the New York underworld's first Mafia war in a decade. Sonny arranges for Michael to flee to Sicily under the protection of Vito's friend Don Tommasino.

The war between the Five Families drags on, and Sonny, unable to break the stalemate, orders bloody raids that earn him a legendary reputation. He also begins plotting to take out the rival Mafia bosses. Emilio Barzini, Vito's rival and the power behind Sollozzo, enlists Connie's abusive husband, Carlo Rizzi, to help set a trap. Earlier, Sonny assaulted Carlo after he attacked Connie. To draw Sonny out into the open, Carlo provokes Connie into an argument before severely beating her. Hysterical and in pain, she telephones the Corleone compound, asking Sonny for help. Enraged, Sonny speeds towards Connie's apartment in Hell's Kitchen ahead of his bodyguards. At the Long Beach Causeway toll plaza, Barzini's men trap Sonny and shoot him to death.

During a meeting with the other crime family dons to establish peace, Vito realizes that Barzini masterminded Sonny's murder. After Michael returns from Sicily, he assumes Sonny's place as Vito's heir apparent. Vito and Michael secretly continue Sonny's plot to wipe out the other New York dons to avenge Sonny's death and eliminate their rivals once and for all. Michael concludes Carlo set Sonny up, but makes him a top associate in order to make Carlo drop his guard. After Vito dies in 1955 from a heart attack, Michael has the other dons murdered, including Barzini, who is shot twice in the back on the steps of a courthouse in broad daylight. Michael informs Carlo that the rival dons have been killed and coerces Carlo's confession for his part in arranging Sonny's murder. Carlo admits Barzini was the mastermind. On Michael's orders, Clemenza garrotes Carlo to death. With that strike, the Corleones regain their traditional position as the most powerful crime family in the country.

== Role in Godfather sequels ==
As well as appearing in the original film, The Godfather, Sonny is featured in the sequel, The Godfather Part II. In this film, he briefly appears in some scenes as an infant and as a young child. He makes a final appearance at the end of the film, in a flashback scene that portrays Vito's birthday celebration on December 7th, 1941. Michael announces that he has dropped out of college and enlisted to fight in World War II. Sonny is furious at the decision and berates his brother for risking his life "for a bunch of strangers". This scene also reveals that Sonny introduced Carlo to Connie, and the rest of the family, which led to their marriage.

In The Godfather Part III, Vincent Corleone is introduced as Sonny's illegitimate son with Lucy Mancini. Vincent succeeds Michael as head of the Corleone family at the end of the film. Vincent's existence in the film contradicts Puzo's original novel, which stated that Lucy never bore a child with Sonny.

=== Family ===
- Vito Corleone: father; played by Marlon Brando and by Robert De Niro as young adult Vito Corleone
- Carmela Corleone: mother; played by Morgana King
- Sandra Corleone: wife; played by Julie Gregg
- Tom Hagen: adoptive brother; played by Robert Duvall
- Fredo Corleone: brother; played by John Cazale
- Michael Corleone: brother; played by Al Pacino
- Constanzia "Connie" Corleone: sister; played by Talia Shire
- Mary Corleone: niece; played by Sofia Coppola
- Anthony Corleone: nephew; played by Anthony Gounaris (The Godfather); played by James Gounaris (The Godfather Part II); played by Franc D'Ambrosio in The Godfather Part III
- Francesca Corleone: daughter, born 1937
- Kathryn Corleone: daughter, born 1937
- Frank Corleone: son, born 1940
- Santino Corleone Jr.: son, born 1945
- Vincent Corleone: son with Lucy Mancini born 1948, played by Andy García

== Behind the scenes ==
- Coppola staged Sonny's death scene in The Godfather to be reminiscent of the final death scene of Clyde Barrow (Warren Beatty) and Bonnie Parker (Faye Dunaway) in Bonnie and Clyde.
- Coppola had the car radio play the broadcast of the baseball playoff game won by Bobby Thomson hitting the Shot Heard Round the World. This would place Sonny's death on October 3, 1951, contradicting the novel by several years.
- Among the actors auditioning for the role of Michael during casting for The Godfather, one unknown off-Broadway actor named Robert De Niro also read for Sonny's part, as well as Michael's and Carlo's, without success. Raw footage of him in the scene where Paulie Gatto offers to kill Rizzi can be seen on the DVD. Eventually, Coppola cast Caan in the role and gave De Niro the part of Paulie, but he "traded" him to the film The Gang That Couldn't Shoot Straight for Al Pacino, who soon got the part of Michael. Anthony Perkins not only auditioned for Sonny, but also for Tom Hagen.
- Originally Caan was to be cast as the main character Michael Corleone (Sonny's youngest brother), while Carmine Caridi was signed as Sonny. However Coppola demanded that the role of Michael be played by Al Pacino instead. The studio agreed to Pacino but insisted on having Caan be cast as Sonny, so he remained in the production.
- Caan was nominated for an Academy Award for Best Supporting Actor for his performance in the film, competing with co-stars Pacino and Robert Duvall, giving the movie three entries in that category.
- The scene at the films beginning where Sonny accosts a photographer, destroys his camera, then pays for it was ad-libbed by Caan. The camera he wrecked was a vintage model from the 1930s.

== Cultural references ==
- Sonny's death scene has been parodied several times on The Simpsons, including in the final scene of "All's Fair in Oven War", an episode in which Caan lent his voice. In that episode, the tollbooth death scene is re-enacted as part of Cletus Spuckler's revenge on Caan for "stealing" his wife Brandine's heart. Sonny's death was parodied in the earlier episode "Mr. Plow", in a scene where Bart is pelted with snowballs by his schoolmates when his father Homer clears the snow in front of the school. The scene where Sonny beats Carlo Rizzi has also been parodied, in the episode "Strong Arms of the Ma".
- The tollbooth scene was parodied along with the execution montage in the final scene of the Harvey Birdman, Attorney at Law episode "Dabba Don". In this scene the Ant Hill Mob from Wacky Races gun down Judge Mightor from their car.
- Popular sportswriter Bill Simmons used to frequently compare the "Sonny Corleone move" to the "Michael Corleone move" when referring to hasty, rash decisions that end badly when a patient, reasoned approach would have been far more successful. Often, this analogy was applied to free agent signings and trades in the NBA.
- Conan O'Brien also used the tollbooth scene in a parody on Conan, explaining how he was dropped from NBC.
- In the HBO series The Sopranos, the fictional strip club Bada Bing! is named after the catchphrase "bada bing" that Sonny uses to describe an up-close shooting.
- In an episode of Spin City when the Mayor is attacked in a campaign ad and the others discuss what to do, Deputy Mayor Charlie Crawford immediately suggests swift, ruthless, and immediate retaliation to which his coworker Caitlin (sarcastically) replies "Thank you Sonny Corleone."
- The American football player Sonny Styles was nicknamed after Corleone.

Preceded by Vito Corleone	Acting head of the Corleone crime family The Godfather ca. 1945–1946	Succeeded by Vito Corleone
