= Carmela Corleone =

Fictional character from The Godfather series

- The Godfather character
- Morgana King as Carmela Corleone
- First appearance: The Godfather
- Last appearance: The Godfather: The Game
- Created by: Mario Puzo
- Portrayed by: Morgana King (48–62); Francesca De Sapio (20–25)

In-universe information
- Gender: Female
- Spouse: Vito Corleone (1915–1955, Vito's death)
- Children: Sonny Corleone; Fredo Corleone; Michael Corleone; Connie Corleone; Tom Hagen (adopted son)
- Relatives: Francesca Corleone (granddaughter); Kathryn Corleone (granddaughter); Frank Corleone (grandson); Santino Corleone Jr.(grandson); Vincent Mancini (grandson); Anthony Corleone (grandson); Mary Corleone (granddaughter)

Carmela Corleone (1897–1959) is a fictional character in Mario Puzo's 1969 novel The Godfather. Carmela is portrayed by Italian-American singer Morgana King in Francis Ford Coppola's 1972 film adaptation of the novel, and in The Godfather Part II (1974). King also played Carmela Corleone in the 1977 television mini-series, The Godfather Saga.

The character of Carmela and her husband Vito, a crime boss, have four children: Santino ("Sonny"), Frederico ("Fredo"), Michael and Constanzia ("Connie"). Her first name is almost never mentioned in either the movies or the novel, although it is referenced in the sequel books. Carmela is a major character in the 2012 prequel novel The Family Corleone, by writer Ed Falco, which portrays their early years together raising a family as Vito becomes a crime boss.

== Casting ==
Jazz singer Morgana King had never acted before being cast as Carmela Corleone in The Godfather (1972), opposite Marlon Brando as the mob boss and patriarch of the Corleone crime family. The daughter of Sicilian-born parents, she needed to be persuaded to take on the role, and got the part without having to read for it. She essentially had no speaking lines in the first film, but sang "Luna Mezz'o Mare" in Italian in a wedding scene.

In The Godfather Part II's flashback scenes, the young Carmela is portrayed by Francesca De Sapio. King refused to lie in a coffin to portray her character in death for superstitious reasons. Instead, the body in the coffin in the sequel was played by the mother of director Francis Ford Coppola.

== Character biography ==
Carmela was born in Sicily in 1897 and immigrated to the United States shortly after the turn of the century. She married Vito Corleone in 1915; they were married for 40 years until Vito's death in 1955. They had four children: Sonny, Fredo, Michael and Connie. They also took in Sonny's friend, Tom Hagen, who later served as the family consigliere.

In the novel, Carmela Corleone is portrayed as a traditional Italian immigrant woman who speaks in very broken English. In the movies, however, she speaks fluent English as an adult, with a marked New York accent. In the novel, she develops a close relationship with Michael's girlfriend and future wife, Kay. She is given more expansive dialogue in The Godfather Part II, notably when she confronts her daughter Connie about her behavior early in the film, and when she discusses family life with Michael, who fears that his role as Don of the Corleone criminal empire will cost him his family. Carmela Corleone dies toward the end of the sequel.

Carmela was disturbed by Vito's change from a kind, quiet young man to a pragmatic and ruthless criminal. However Carmela seems to forgive Vito for his many crimes, because he remains essentially a good man who is devoted to his family. Devoutly Catholic, Carmela attends Mass every day to pray for her husband's soul to keep him from "going down there."

== Cultural influence ==
In An Offer We Can't Refuse: The Mafia in the Mind of America, journalist George De Stefano writes about the Corleones as portrayed in The Godfather: "I recognized these people, their appearance, mannerisms, behavior, and attitudes. And I identified with them...Vito and Carmela Corleone were my grandparents."

== Family members ==
- Vito Corleone—Husband; played by Marlon Brando in The Godfather, played by Robert De Niro in The Godfather Part II
- Santino "Sonny" Corleone—Eldest son; played by James Caan
- Tom Hagen—informally adopted son, played by Robert Duvall
- Frederico "Fredo" Corleone—Middle son; played by John Cazale
- Michael Corleone—Youngest son; played by Al Pacino
- Constanzia "Connie" Corleone—Daughter; played by Talia Shire
- Frank Corleone—Grandson
- Santino Corleone Jr.—Grandson
- Francesca Corleone—Granddaughter, twin of Kathryn Corleone
- Kathryn Corleone—Granddaughter, twin of Francesca Corleone
- Vincent Mancini—Grandson; played by Andy García
- Anthony Corleone—Grandson; played by Franc D'Ambrosio
- Mary Corleone—Granddaughter; played by Sofia Coppola
- Victor Rizzi—Grandson
- Michael Rizzi—Grandson
