= Kay Adams Corleone =

Fictional character from The Godfather

Kay Adams
- The Godfather character
- Diane Keaton as Kay Adams in The Godfather Part II
- First appearance: The Godfather
- Last appearance: The Godfather's Revenge
- Created by: Mario Puzo
- Portrayed by: Diane Keaton

In-universe information
- Gender: Female
- Occupation: Teacher
- Affiliation: Corleone family
- Family: Vito Corleone (father-in-law); Carmela Corleone (mother-in-law); Santino "Sonny" Corleone (brother-in-law); Frederico "Fredo" Corleone (brother-in-law); Constanzia "Connie" Corleone (sister-in-law); Tom Hagen (adopted brother-in-law)
- Spouses: Michael Corleone (1951-59; divorced); Douglas Michelson
- Children: Anthony Corleone; Mary Corleone
- Religion: Roman Catholic (converted from Baptist)

Katherine "Kay" Corleone (née Adams) is a fictional character originating in Mario Puzo's 1969 novel The Godfather. Diane Keaton portrayed her in Francis Ford Coppola's film trilogy based on the novel.

Before their divorce, she is the second wife of Michael Corleone. She is also the mother of his children, Anthony and Mary Corleone. She has a pivotal abortion while pregnant with the couple's prospective second son. In contrast to most of the characters in the novel and films, Kay Adams is from a well-to-do White Anglo-Saxon Protestant family.

== Significance ==
Kay Adams Corleone and Connie Corleone (Talia Shire) are the only female characters who are well-represented in The Godfather media. In the opening wedding scene of The Godfather, Kay is the only female character who "speaks more than a few lines, and she only then asks questions", which serve as a means to provide exposition about the male members of the family who dominate the story. In a 50-year retrospective of the original film, The Independent said that "female characters are either relegated to the sidelines or treated very badly", and that "Keaton registers very strongly as Michael Corleone's girlfriend Kay Adams in the early scenes – but then she all but disappears for two hours before re-emerging only in the final chapters". Kay is described as "the ultimate outsider in the Corleone household", and it has been noted that "Coppola needs to present her as clueless about her husband's Mafia activities and ask questions that no Mafia wife would ask—because she would know the answers". Kay is contrasted with Apollonia, to whom Michael is briefly married while hiding in Italy, who "represents the traditional Sicilian idea of womanhood". Nevertheless, Kay marries Michael, even after he disappears for over a year during his family's gang war with other mafia families.

Kay's character arc across films has been described as "plausible", portraying her initial concern, and then increasing estrangement from Michael Corleone, as she confronts the moral and emotional toll of his criminal empire. In The Godfather Part II, her alienation intensifies as she challenges Michael's loyalty to the family's Sicilian traditions and ultimately separates from him after revealing her abortion of their child. By The Godfather Part III, Kay is remarried, and more aggressively confronts Michael over his hypocrisy while seeking to shield their children from his influence. Their fleeting attempt at reconciliation is permanently shattered by the violence inherent in Michael's life. The conclusion of her character arc in the first Godfather film differs from that of the novel, in which she converts to Roman Catholicism and begins to partake in the same rituals of seeking absolution for her husband's sins as Michael's mother seeks for Vito Corleone. An early draft of the film's script similarly ended with Kay's lighting candles for Michael.

== Fictional biography ==
Kay is a native of Hanover, New Hampshire, and the only child of a Baptist minister and his wife. She is also the longtime girlfriend and eventual second wife of Michael Corleone (Al Pacino), the youngest son of Don Vito Corleone (Marlon Brando), the head of the Corleone crime family.

In 1945, Kay meets and falls in love with Michael, who is then a student at Dartmouth College. As a non-Italian, she is an outsider to the Corleones' world, and embodies Michael's initial desire to live a more Americanized life separate from his family's.

=== The Godfather (1972) ===
In 1945, Don Vito Corleone listens to requests during the wedding of his daughter Connie (Talia Shire) to Carlo Rizzi. At the wedding Michael introduces Kay to his family as his girlfriend, and Kay and Michael sit at a table away from the family. In the novel, the other guests notice that Kay's manner is somewhat freer than what is expected from an unmarried woman in traditional southern Italian culture.

Kay is initially unaware that the Corleones are a powerful Mafia family. When the famous singer Johnny Fontane (Al Martino) arrives at Connie's wedding reception, Kay, a fan, is surprised that Michael knows him, then frightened when he relates how his father "helped" his godson's early career by threatening to kill his manager unless he released Fontane from his contract. Michael assures Kay that this is his family, but not him.

After a failed assassination attempt on his father, Michael murders the culprit, drug lord Virgil Sollozzo (Al Lettieri), and Captain Mark McCluskey (Sterling Hayden), a corrupt NYPD officer on Sollozzo's payroll. Michael flees to Sicily, where he falls in love with and marries a young local woman, Apollonia Vitelli (Simonetta Stefanelli). Kay has no knowledge of Michael's whereabouts or his marriage, and eventually returns to her hometown to work as a teacher. She asks the Corleone family's consigliere Tom Hagen (Robert Duvall) to deliver a letter to Michael, but Hagen refuses lest it be used in court proceedings as proof the family had "knowledge of his whereabouts". During this time, Kay develops a friendship with Michael's mother, Carmela (Morgana King).

Apollonia is killed in a car bombing meant for Michael. After recovering from his injuries, Michael returns to the United States. More than a year following his return, Michael seeks out Kay, wanting to reconcile with her, although she is upset that he now works for his father. They marry after he promises her that the Corleone family will be completely legitimate within five years. In the film, Kay and Michael have two children, Anthony and Mary (in the novel, they have two boys). They are born within two years of each other, leading Michael to joke that Kay is "more Italian than Yankee". Kay retorts that Michael is "more Yankee than Italian", because he always takes his work home with him.

Michael becomes operating head of the Corleone family, replacing Sonny as Vito's heir apparent. He succeeds his father as Don upon his death in 1955. Kay joins Michael at Vito's funeral, and at the baptism of Connie's second baby. Shortly after, Carlo Rizzi, who set up Sonny to be killed by a rival family, is murdered on Michael's orders as part of a mass slaughter of the other New York Dons to avenge Sonny's murder. Connie later confronts Michael about his involvement in Carlo's death while Kay is in the room. Kay asks Michael if he ordered Carlo's death and is relieved when he denies responsibility. As she leaves, she sees Michael's capos enter the office with Clemenza paying reverence to her husband as "Don Corleone" (in the novel, as "Don Michael"). Kay realizes that Connie was telling the truth, and that Michael has become his father's successor in every way.

=== The Godfather Part II (1974) ===
At the beginning of The Godfather Part II (set in 1958–60), Kay lives with Michael at his Lake Tahoe compound, and is pregnant with the couple's third child. She implores Michael to fulfill his promise to legitimize the family business. Michael makes a genuine effort to eliminate the family's criminal ties, but remains tied to the underworld due to his escalating war with rival Hyman Roth (Lee Strasberg), as well as his growing obsession with revenge.

On the night of Anthony's First Communion, assassins machine gun Michael and Kay's bedroom; the couple barely escape unharmed. Michael goes into hiding for a time. After Michael uncovers the source of the threat, he returns home, where Hagen tells Michael that his Kay has suffered an apparent miscarriage.

Kay grows increasingly disgusted with Michael's criminal life; in particular, she is appalled that Michael's button men have become Anthony's closest companions. During the U.S. Senate hearing on organized crime that is being held in Washington D.C., Kay sits behind Michael, appearing to support him while he testifies falsely about his business activities. Shortly thereafter, Kay tells Michael she is leaving him and taking the children. She is convinced Michael will always live in a world of crime and violence. During the ensuing argument, she reveals that her "miscarriage" was actually an abortion and that she had the procedure to avoid bringing another of Michael's sons into the world. Enraged, Michael knocks Kay down and takes custody of their children, banishing her from the family; the two separate soon afterward.

Michael initially prevents Kay from seeing their children. She secretly visits them (with Connie's help), and Connie tries to hurry her out before Michael returns home, but Michael sees her standing at the back door trying to get Anthony to give her one last kiss before she leaves. Michael coldly closes the door in her face.

=== The Godfather Part III (1990) ===
In 1979, Michael and Kay are divorced; their children, Anthony (Franc D'Ambrosio) and Mary (Sofia Coppola), live with Kay, who is remarried to a prosecutor named Douglas Michelson. In an introductory narrative, Michael explains he had granted Kay custody of their children. Michael and Kay, who have not seen each other since 1971, have an uneasy reunion at a reception in Michael's honor at St. Patrick's Old Cathedral that follows a papal order induction ceremony.

Anthony tells his father that he is leaving law school to become an opera singer. Kay supports his decision, but Michael wants his son to finish his studies or go into the "family business" (putatively a legitimate charitable foundation, but still involved in underworld activities). An argument ensues, in which Kay tells Michael that both she and Anthony know about Michael's having ordered his brother Fredo (John Cazale)'s murder 20 years earlier (as portrayed at the end of the previous film). She says she "dreads" him, but they reach a truce after Michael agrees to let Anthony leave school and not interfere with his music career.

Michael survives another attempt on his life, but later suffers a diabetic stroke, after which Kay visits him in the hospital, and they begin to repair their relationship. They travel together to Sicily for Anthony's operatic debut. There, Michael asks Kay's forgiveness and says he had a different destiny planned for them; he regrets losing her and confesses he still loves her. Kay tearfully admits that she will always love him.

Soon afterward, burdened by the murder of his Sicilian mentor Don Tommasino, Michael retires as Don of the Corleone Family, naming his nephew Vincent (Andy Garcia) as his successor, and he and Kay reconcile. They attend Anthony's operatic debut, Pietro Mascagni's Cavalleria rusticana, together in Palermo at the Teatro Massimo. After the performance, however, their daughter Mary is killed in an assassination attempt on Michael, who is also wounded. A distraught Kay is last seen with Michael, weeping over Mary's body as an equally devastated Michael screams in agony. Outside sources reveal that Kay left Michael for her own safety, never seeing each other again. Michael moved back to Sicily, where he lived the rest of his life in a permanent anhedonic depression, dying alone 19 years later.

=== Sequel novels ===
Kay appears as a supporting character in The Godfather Returns (2004) and The Godfather's Revenge (2006), Mark Winegardner's two sequels to Puzo's original novel. The novels expand upon the early days of her relationship with Michael, her gradual estrangement from him, and her life after their divorce.

== Casting ==
Coppola noted that he first noticed Diane Keaton in Lovers and Other Strangers, and cast her for the role of Kay Adams because of her reputation for eccentricity that he wanted her to bring to the role. Keaton read with both James Caan and Martin Sheen before Al Pacino was finally confirmed for the role of Michael. One report noted that "Keaton said she always felt like an outsider in the movie—a similarity she shared with Kay, who is literally left with a door closing in her face at the end of the first film".

Two years later, she reprised her role as Kay Adams in The Godfather Part II. She was initially reluctant, saying, "At first, I was skeptical about playing Kay again in the Godfather sequel. But when I read the script, the character seemed much more substantial than in the first film". In Part II, her character changed dramatically, becoming more embittered about her husband's criminal empire.

== Reception ==
Even though Keaton received widespread exposure from the films, some critics felt that her character's importance was minimal. Time wrote that she was "invisible in The Godfather and pallid in The Godfather Part II, but according to Empire magazine, Keaton "proves the quiet lynchpin which is no mean feat in [the] necessarily male dominated films".

Film historian Carlos Clarens described Kay as being "unduly stupid, asking questions that no sensible mafioso wife had the right to ask her man", and ultimately having "no place in the cinematic saga of the Corleones", a judgment that reflects her status as a perpetual outsider and her inability to adapt to the criminal enterprise that defines Michael's life. Clarens found Kay's revelation of having had an abortion as making Michael the sympathetic character in the exchange, forcing audiences to "accept and applaud" Michael's subsequent rejection of Kay. Critic George De Stefano rejects these conclusions, finding Kay to be a necessary element of the story, and her defiant abortion to be a praiseworthy means of escaping the family.
