= The Godfather Part II =

1974 film by Francis Ford Coppola

- Theatrical release poster
- Directed by: Francis Ford Coppola
- Screenplay by: Francis Ford Coppola; Mario Puzo
- Based on: The Godfather by Mario Puzo
- Produced by: Francis Ford Coppola
- Starring: Al Pacino; Robert Duvall; Diane Keaton; Robert De Niro; Talia Shire; Morgana King; John Cazale; Mariana Hill; Lee Strasberg; Gastone Moschin; Giuseppe Sillato
- Cinematography: Gordon Willis
- Edited by: Peter Zinner; Barry Malkin; Richard Marks
- Music by: Nino Rota
- Production companies: Paramount Pictures; The Coppola Company
- Distributed by: Paramount Pictures
- Release dates: December 12, 1974 (Loew's Astor Plaza Theatre); December 20, 1974 (United States)
- Running time: 200 minutes
- Country: United States
- Languages: English; Sicilian
- Budget: $13 million
- Box office: $93 million (Note: Current box office websites do not have international grosses before 2010. Some sources claim an original release of $88 million.)

The Godfather Part II is a 1974 American epic gangster film produced and directed by Francis Ford Coppola, loosely based on the 1969 novel The Godfather by Mario Puzo, who co-wrote the screenplay with Coppola. It is both a sequel and a prequel to the 1972 film The Godfather, presenting two parallel dramas: one picks up the 1958 story of Michael Corleone (Al Pacino), the new Don of the Corleone family, protecting the family business in the aftermath of an attempt on his life; the other covers the journey of his father, Vito Corleone (Robert De Niro), from his Sicilian childhood to the founding of his family enterprise in New York City. The ensemble cast also features Robert Duvall, Diane Keaton, Talia Shire, Morgana King, John Cazale, Marianna Hill and Lee Strasberg.

Following the first film's success, Paramount Pictures began developing a follow-up, with many of the cast and crew returning. Coppola, who was given more creative control, had wanted to make both a sequel and a prequel to The Godfather that would tell the story of Vito's rise and Michael's fall. Principal photography began in October 1973 and wrapped up in June 1974. The Godfather Part II premiered in New York City on December 12, 1974, and was released in the United States on December 20, 1974. It grossed $48 million in the United States and Canada and up to $93 million worldwide on a $13 million budget. The film was nominated for eleven Academy Awards and became the first sequel to win Best Picture. Its six Oscar wins also included Best Director for Coppola, Best Supporting Actor for De Niro, and Best Adapted Screenplay for Coppola and Puzo. Pacino won Best Actor at the BAFTAs and was nominated at the Oscars.

The Godfather Part II is considered to be one of the greatest films of all time, as well as a rare example of a sequel that rivals its predecessor. Like its predecessor, Part II remains a highly influential film, especially in the gangster genre. In 1997, the American Film Institute ranked it as the 32nd-greatest film in American film history and it retained this position ten years later. It was selected for preservation in the US National Film Registry of the Library of Congress in 1993, being deemed "culturally, historically, or aesthetically significant".

The Godfather Part III, the final installment in the trilogy, was released in 1990.

== Plot ==
=== Vito ===
In 1901, nine-year-old Vito Andolini escapes from Corleone, Sicily, in the Kingdom of Italy to New York City after mafia chieftain Don Ciccio kills the rest of his family. An immigration officer registers him as Vito Corleone. By 1917 Vito is married in Little Italy and has an infant son, Sonny. Black Hand extortionist Don Fanucci preys on the neighborhood, costing Vito his grocery store job. He begins stealing for a living with his neighbor Peter Clemenza and has two more children: Fredo and Michael.

Vito, Clemenza and Salvatore Tessio sell stolen dresses door-to-door. Fanucci demands payoffs from them of $200 each. Vito doubts Fanucci's muscle and decides to offer less. He meets Fanucci and offers $100, which Fanucci grudgingly accepts. Emboldened, Vito tracks Fanucci back to his apartment and kills him. Vito's reputation spreads, and neighbors ask him to defend them from other predatory figures.

In 1922, Vito and his family travel to Sicily to start an olive oil importing business. He and business partner Don Tommasino visit an elderly Don Ciccio. He obtains Ciccio's blessing for their business, then reveals his identity and slices Ciccio's stomach, killing him and avenging the Andolini family.

=== Michael ===
In 1958, Don Michael Corleone has several meetings at his Lake Tahoe compound during the first communion of his son Anthony. Johnny Ola, representing Jewish Mob boss Hyman Roth, promises support in taking over a Las Vegas casino. Corleone capo Frank Pentangeli asks for help defending Bronx territory from two Roth affiliates known as the Rosato brothers. Michael refuses as he does not want to endanger the Roth deal, frustrating Pentangeli. Senator Pat Geary demands a bribe to secure the casino license and insults Michael's Italian heritage. That night, Michael and his pregnant wife Kay narrowly escape an assassination attempt. Suspecting a traitor in the family, Michael puts consigliere Tom Hagen in charge and leaves the compound.

Michael separately tells Pentangeli and Roth that he suspects the other of planning the hit, and arranges a peace meeting between Pentangeli and the Rosatos. At the meeting the brothers attempt to strangle Pentangeli. A police officer drops in, forcing the brothers to flee. Hagen blackmails Geary into cooperating with the Corleones by having him framed for the murder of a prostitute.

Roth invites Michael to Havana to invest in his activities under the Batista government. Michael expresses reservations, given the growing Cuban Revolution. Later Roth becomes angry when Michael asks who ordered the Rosatos to kill Pentangeli, reminding Michael he did not question his order to kill his friend, Moe Greene. (Note: As depicted in The Godfather (1972)) Michael and Ola attend a New Year's Eve party where Fredo pretends not to know Ola but later slips. Michael realizes that Fredo is the traitor and orders both Roth and Ola killed. He sends an assassin to the hospital where Roth resides to suffocate him with a pillow. The assassin fails and is killed by Roth's guard. Batista resigns and flees amid rebel advances, and Michael, Fredo and Roth separately escape Cuba as the communist rebels seize Havana. Back home, Hagen tells Michael that Kay miscarried.

Roth uses his connections to arrange a Senate committee on organized crime to investigate the Corleone family. Pentangeli agrees to testify against Michael and is placed under witness protection. On returning to Nevada, Fredo tells Michael that he did not realize Roth was planning an assassination, then lashes out over being excluded from the family business. Michael disowns Fredo but orders that he should not be harmed while their mother Carmela is alive. Michael attends the committee hearing with Hagen and Pentangeli's brother Vincenzo. Pentangeli, upon seeing Vincenzo, retracts his testimony, and the hearing dissolves in an uproar. Kay tells Michael that she actually had an abortion and intends to leave him and take their children. Michael strikes her in rage and banishes her.

A year later, Carmela passes away. At her funeral, a mourning Fredo embraces Michael and befriends Anthony over fishing, seemingly being forgiven. While Michael is away, Kay visits her children with his sister Connie's help but she takes too long to leave and is discovered by Michael; he coldly closes the door in her face without a word. Roth returns to the United States after being refused entry to Israel. Corleone capo Rocco Lampone assassinates him at the airport and is shot dead trying to escape. Hagen visits Pentangeli at the army barracks where he is held and remarks that conspirators against a Roman emperor could commit suicide to save their families. Pentangeli is later found dead in his bathtub, having slit his wrists. Corleone enforcer Al Neri takes Fredo fishing on the lake and shoots him as Michael watches from the compound.

A flashback depicts Vito's 50th birthday party on December 7, 1941. While the family waits for Vito, Michael announces that he has dropped out of college and joined the Marines, angering Sonny and surprising Hagen. Only Fredo supports his decision. When Vito is heard arriving, Michael remains at the table while the others welcome him in surprise.

In the present, Michael sits alone by the lake at the family compound.

== Cast ==
- Al Pacino as Michael Corleone
- Robert Duvall as Tom Hagen
- Diane Keaton as Kay Adams Corleone
- Robert De Niro as Vito Corleone
  - Oreste Baldini as young Vito Corleone
- John Cazale as Fredo Corleone
- Talia Shire as Connie Corleone
- Lee Strasberg as Hyman Roth
  - John Megna as young Hyman Roth
- Michael V. Gazzo as Frank Pentangeli
- G. D. Spradlin as Senator Pat Geary
- Richard Bright as Al Neri
- Gastone Moschin as Don Fanucci
- Tom Rosqui as Rocco Lampone
- Bruno Kirby as young Peter Clemenza
- Frank Sivero as Genco Abbandando
- Morgana King as Mama Carmela Corleone
  - Francesca De Sapio as young Carmela Corleone
- Marianna Hill as Deanna Corleone
- Leopoldo Trieste as Signor Roberto
- Dominic Chianese as Johnny Ola
- Troy Donahue as Merle Johnson (Note: A nod to Donahue's real name, Merle Johnson Jr.)
- Giuseppe Sillato as Don Francesco 'Ciccio
- Joe Spinell as Willi Cicci
- Danny Aiello as Tony Rosato
- Carmine Caridi as Carmine Rosato
- Amerigo Tot as Bussetta
- Abe Vigoda as Salvatore Tessio
  - John Aprea as young Tessio
- Gianni Russo as Carlo Rizzi
- James Caan as Sonny Corleone
- Julie Gregg as Sandra Corleone
- Ivonne Coll as Yolanda
- Peter Donat as Senator Questadt
- Fay Spain as Mrs. Marcia Roth
- Maria Carta as Vito's mother
- Roger Corman as senator #2
- Harry Dean Stanton as F.B.I. agent #1
- James Murdock as F.B.I. agent #2
- Tommy Lasorda as military officer (uncredited)
- Tony Sirico as Rosato brothers' hood (uncredited)
- Roman Coppola as boy (uncredited)
- Sofia Coppola as a child on a ship (uncredited)

== Production ==
=== Development ===
Francis Ford Coppola (pictured in 1973), director of the film

Mario Puzo started writing a script for a sequel in December 1971, before The Godfather was even released; its initial title was The Death of Michael Corleone. Francis Ford Coppola's idea for the sequel would be to "juxtapose the ascension of the family under Vito Corleone with the decline of the family under his son Michael ... I had always wanted to write a screenplay that told the story of a father and a son at the same age. They were both in their thirties, and I would integrate the two stories ... In order not to merely make Godfather I over again, I gave Godfather II this double structure by extending the story in both the past and in the present". Coppola met with Martin Scorsese about directing the film, but Paramount Pictures refused. Coppola also, in his director's commentary on The Godfather Part II, mentioned that the scenes depicting the Senate committee interrogation of Michael Corleone and Frank Pentangeli are based on the Valachi hearings and that Pentangeli is a Valachi-like figure.

Production, however, nearly ended before it began when Al Pacino's lawyers told Coppola that he had grave misgivings with the quality of Puzo's script and was not coming. Coppola spent an entire night rewriting it before giving it to Pacino for his review. Pacino approved it, and the production went forward. The film's original budget was $6 million but costs increased to over $11 million, with Variety's review claiming it was over $15 million.

=== Casting ===
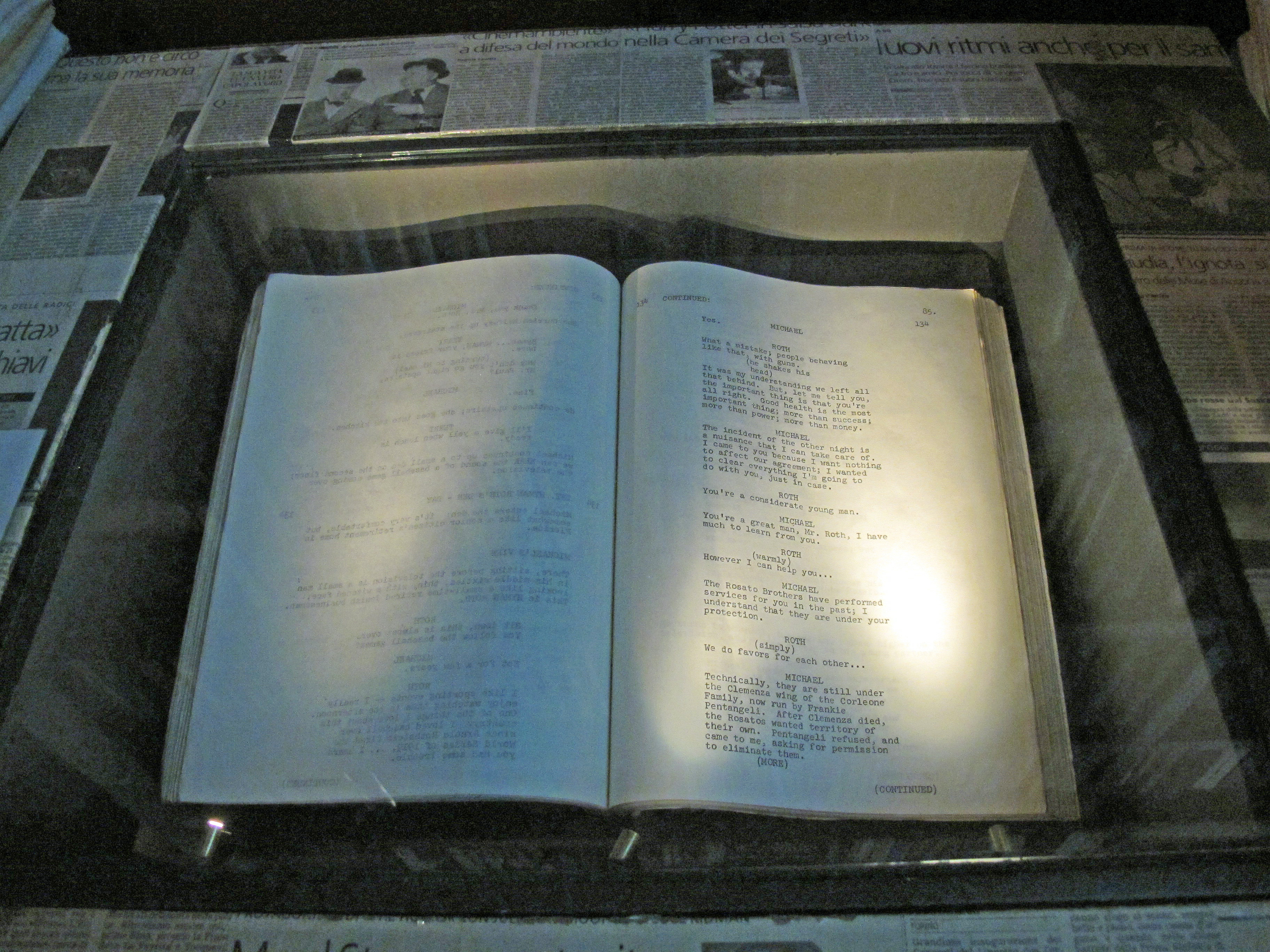
Original screenplay at the National Museum of Cinema in Turin

Several actors from the first film did not return for the sequel. Marlon Brando initially agreed to return for the birthday flashback sequence, but the actor, feeling mistreated by the board at Paramount, failed to show up for the single day's shooting. Coppola then rewrote the scene that same day. Richard S. Castellano, who portrayed Peter Clemenza in the first film, also declined to return, allegedly because he and the producers could not reach an agreement on his demands that he be allowed to write the character's dialogue, though this claim was disputed by Castellano's widow in a 1991 letter to People magazine. The part in the plot originally intended for the latter-day Clemenza was then filled by the character of Frank Pentangeli, played by Michael V. Gazzo.

Coppola offered James Cagney the role of Hyman Roth, but he refused as he had retired from acting. James Caan agreed to reprise the role of Sonny in the birthday flashback sequence, demanding he be paid the same amount he received for the entire previous film for the single scene in Part II, which he received. Among the actors depicting Senators in the hearing committee are film producer/director Roger Corman, writer/producer William Bowers, producer Phil Feldman, and actor Peter Donat.

=== Filming ===
The Godfather Part II was shot between October 1, 1973, and June 19, 1974. The scenes that took place in Cuba were shot in Santo Domingo, Dominican Republic. Charles Bluhdorn, whose Gulf+Western conglomerate owned Paramount, felt strongly about developing the Dominican Republic as a movie-making site. Forza d'Agrò was the Sicilian town featured in the film.

Unlike with the first film, Coppola was given near-complete control over production. In his commentary, he said this resulted in a shoot that ran very smoothly despite multiple locations and two narratives running parallel within one film. Coppola discusses his decision to make this the first major American motion picture to use "Part II" in its title in the director's commentary on the DVD edition of the film released in 2002. Paramount was initially opposed because they believed the audience would not be interested in an addition to a story they had already seen. But the director prevailed, and the film's success began the common practice of numbered sequels. Only three weeks before the release, film critics and journalists pronounced Part II a disaster. The crosscutting between Vito and Michael's parallel stories was judged too frequent, not allowing enough time to leave a lasting impression on the audience. Coppola and the editors returned to the cutting room to change the film's narrative structure, but could not complete the work in time, leaving the final scenes poorly timed at the opening. It was the last major American motion picture to have release prints made with Technicolor's dye imbibition process until the late 1990s.

=== Music ===
The score is by Nino Rota with additions by Carmine Coppola. It won the 1974 Academy Award for Best Original Score.

== Release ==
=== Theatrical ===
The Godfather Part II premiered in New York City on December 12, 1974, and was released in the United States on December 20, 1974.

=== Home media ===
Coppola created The Godfather Saga expressly for American television in a 1975 release that combined The Godfather and The Godfather Part II with unused footage from those two films in a chronological order that toned down the violent, sexual, and profane material for its NBC debut on November 18, 1977. In 1981, Paramount released the Godfather Epic VHS box set, which also told the story of the first two films in chronological order, again with additional scenes, but not redacted for broadcast sensibilities. Coppola returned to the film again in 1992 when he updated that release with footage from The Godfather Part III and more unreleased material. This home viewing release, under the title The Godfather Trilogy 1901–1980, had a total run time of 583 minutes (9 hours, 43 minutes), not including the set's bonus documentary by Jeff Werner on the making of the films, "The Godfather Family: A Look Inside".

The Godfather DVD Collection was released on October 9, 2001, in a package that contained all three films—each with a commentary track by Coppola—and a bonus disc that featured a 73-minute documentary from 1991 entitled The Godfather Family: A Look Inside and other miscellany about the film: the additional scenes originally contained in The Godfather Saga; Francis Coppola's Notebook (a look inside a notebook the director kept with him at all times during the production of the film); rehearsal footage; a promotional featurette from 1971; and video segments on Gordon Willis's cinematography, Nino Rota's and Carmine Coppola's music, the director, the locations and Mario Puzo's screenplays. The DVD also held a Corleone family tree, a "Godfather" timeline, and footage of the Academy Award acceptance speeches. The restoration was confirmed by Francis Ford Coppola during a question-and-answer session for The Godfather Part III, when he said that he had just seen the new transfer and it was "terrific".

==== Restoration ====
After restoration work by Robert A. Harris of Film Preserve, the first two Godfather films were released on DVD and Blu-ray on September 23, 2008, under the title The Godfather: The Coppola Restoration. The Blu-ray Disc box set (four discs) includes high-definition extra features on the restoration and film. They are included on Disc 5 of the DVD box set (five discs).

Other extras are ported over from Paramount's 2001 DVD release. There are slight differences between the repurposed extras on the DVD and Blu-ray Disc sets, with the HD box having more content.

Paramount Pictures restored and remastered The Godfather, The Godfather Part II, and The Godfather Coda: The Death of Michael Corleone (a re-edited cut of the third film) for a limited theatrical run and home media release on Blu-ray and 4K Blu-ray to celebrate the 50th anniversary of the premiere of The Godfather. The disc editions were released on March 22, 2022.

==== Video game ====
A video game based on the film was released for Windows, PlayStation 3, and Xbox 360 in April 2009 by Electronic Arts. It received mixed or average reviews and sold poorly, leading Electronic Arts to cancel plans for a game based on The Godfather Part III.

== Reception ==
=== Box office ===
Although The Godfather Part II did not surpass the original film commercially, it grossed $47.5 million in the United States and Canada. and was Paramount Pictures' highest-grossing film of 1974, and the seventh-highest-grossing picture in the United States. According to its international distributor, the film had grossed $45.3 million internationally by 1994, for a worldwide total of $93 million.

=== Critical response ===
Pauline Kael in The New Yorker was an early champion of the film, writing that it was visually "far more complexly beautiful than the first, just as it's thematically richer, more shadowed, more full." She writes: "Twice I almost cried out at the acts of violence that De Niro's Vito committed. I didn't look away from the images, as I sometimes do in routine action pictures. I wanted to see the worst; there is a powerful need to see it. You need these moments as you need the terrible climaxes in a Tolstoy novel. A great novelist does not spare our feelings (as the historical romancer does); he intensifies them, and so does Coppola." However, while the film's cinematography and acting were immediately acclaimed, many criticized it as overly slow-paced and convoluted. Vincent Canby of The New York Times viewed the film unfavorably, describing it as "stitched together from leftover parts. It talks. It moves in fits and starts, but it has no mind of its own ... The plot defies any rational synopsis." Variety noted that Canby had been downbeat on the original too and claimed that he was in a minority of one and reported that the film had drawn mostly strongly admiring reviews. In A.D. Murphy's review in Variety he described it as a "masterful sequel" and "outstanding in all respects".

William Pechter of Commentary, while admiring the movie, regretted what he saw as its archness and self-importance, calling it an "overly deliberate and self-conscious attempt to make a film that's unmistakably a serious work of art," and professing to "know of no one except movie critics who likes Part II as much as part one." Stanley Kauffmann of The New Republic cited what he called "gaps and distentions" in the story.

Roger Ebert awarded three out of four and wrote that the flashbacks "give Coppola the greatest difficulty in maintaining his pace and narrative force. The story of Michael, told chronologically and without the other material, would have had really substantial impact, but Coppola prevents our complete involvement by breaking the tension." Though praising Pacino's performance and lauding Coppola as "a master of mood, atmosphere, and period", Ebert considered the chronological shifts of its narrative "a structural weakness from which the film never recovers". Gene Siskel gave the film three-and-a-half out of four, writing that it was at times "as beautiful, as harrowing, and as exciting as the original. In fact, The Godfather, Part II may be the second best gangster movie ever made. But it's not the same. Sequels can never be the same. It's like being forced to go to a funeral the second time—the tears just don't flow as easily."

=== Critical re-assessment ===
The film quickly became the subject of a critical re-evaluation. Whether considered separately or with its predecessor as one work, The Godfather Part II is now widely regarded as one of the greatest films in world cinema. Many critics compare it favorably with the original – although it is rarely ranked higher on lists of "greatest" films. On Rotten Tomatoes, it holds a 96% approval rating based on 129 reviews, with an average rating of 9.8/10. The consensus reads, "Drawing on strong performances by Al Pacino and Robert De Niro, Francis Ford Coppola's continuation of Mario Puzo's Mafia saga set new standards for sequels that have yet to be matched or broken." Metacritic, which uses a weighted average, assigned the film a score of 90 out of 100 based on 18 critics, indicating "universal acclaim".

Michael Sragow's conclusion in his 2002 essay, selected for the National Film Registry website, is that "[a]lthough The Godfather and The Godfather Part II depict an American family's moral defeat, as a mammoth, pioneering work of art it remains a national creative triumph." In his 2014 review of the film, Peter Bradshaw of The Guardian wrote "Francis Coppola's breathtakingly ambitious prequel-sequel to his first Godfather movie is as gripping as ever. It is even better than the first film, and has the greatest single final scene in Hollywood history, a real coup de cinéma."

The Godfather Part II was featured on Sight & Sound's Director's list of the ten greatest films of all time in 1992 (ranked at No. 9) and 2002 (where it was ranked at No. 2. The critics ranked it at No. 4) On the 2012 list by the same magazine the film was ranked at No. 31 by critics and at No. 30 by directors. In 2006, Writers Guild of America ranked the film's screenplay (Written by Mario Puzo and Francis Ford Coppola) the 10th greatest ever. It ranked No. 7 on Entertainment Weekly's list of the "100 Greatest Movies of All Time", and #1 on TV Guide's 1999 list of the "50 Greatest Movies of All Time on TV and Video". The Village Voice ranked The Godfather Part II at No. 31 in its Top 250 "Best Films of the Century" list in 1999, based on a poll of critics. In January 2002, the film (along with The Godfather) made the list of the "Top 100 Essential Films of All Time" by the National Society of Film Critics. In 2017, it ranked No. 12 on Empire magazine's reader's poll of The 100 Greatest Movies. In an earlier poll held by the same magazine in 2008, it was voted 19th on the list of 'The 500 Greatest Movies of All Time'. In 2015, it was tenth in the BBC's list of the 100 greatest American films.

Many believe Pacino's performance in The Godfather Part II is his finest acting work. It is now regarded as one of the greatest performances in film history. In 2006, Premiere issued its list of "The 100 Greatest Performances of all Time", putting Pacino's performance at #20. Later in 2009, Total Film issued "The 150 Greatest Performances of All Time", ranking Pacino's performance fourth place.

Ebert added the film to his Great Movies canon, noting he "would not change a word" of his original review but praising the work as "grippingly written, directed with confidence and artistry, photographed by Gordon Willis ... in rich, warm tones." He praises the score: "More than ever, I am convinced it is instrumental to the power and emotional effect of the films. I cannot imagine them without their Nino Rota scores. Against all our objective reason, they instruct us how to feel about the films. Now listen very carefully to the first notes as the big car drives into Miami. You will hear an evocative echo of Bernard Hermann's score for Citizen Kane, another film about a man who got everything he wanted and then lost it."

== Accolades ==
This film is the first sequel to win the Academy Award for Best Picture. The Godfather and The Godfather Part II remain the only original/sequel combination both to win Best Picture. Along with The Lord of the Rings, The Godfather Trilogy shares the distinction that all of its installments were nominated for Best Picture; additionally, The Godfather Part II and The Lord of the Rings: The Return of the King are so far the only sequels to win Best Picture. Al Pacino became the third actor to be Oscar-nominated twice for playing the same character.

Award	Category	Nominee	Result
47th Academy Awards	Best Picture	Francis Ford Coppola, Gray Frederickson and Fred Roos	Won
47th Academy Awards	Best Director	Francis Ford Coppola	Won
47th Academy Awards	Best Actor	Al Pacino	Nominated
47th Academy Awards	Best Supporting Actor	Robert De Niro	Won
47th Academy Awards	Best Supporting Actor	Michael V. Gazzo	Nominated
47th Academy Awards	Best Supporting Actor	Lee Strasberg	Nominated
47th Academy Awards	Best Supporting Actress	Talia Shire	Nominated
47th Academy Awards	Best Adapted Screenplay	Francis Ford Coppola and Mario Puzo	Won
47th Academy Awards	Best Art Direction	Dean Tavoularis, Angelo P. Graham and George R. Nelson	Won
47th Academy Awards	Best Costume Design	Theadora Van Runkle	Nominated
47th Academy Awards	Best Original Dramatic Score	Nino Rota and Carmine Coppola	Won
29th British Academy Film Awards	Best Actor	Al Pacino (Also for Dog Day Afternoon)	Won
29th British Academy Film Awards	Most Promising Newcomer to Leading Film Roles	Robert De Niro	Nominated
29th British Academy Film Awards	Best Film Music	Nino Rota	Nominated
29th British Academy Film Awards	Best Film Editing	Peter Zinner, Barry Malkin, and Richard Marks	Nominated
27th Directors Guild of America Awards	Outstanding Directorial Achievement in Motion Pictures	Francis Ford Coppola	Won
32nd Golden Globe Awards	Best Motion Picture – Drama		Nominated
32nd Golden Globe Awards	Best Director – Motion Picture	Francis Ford Coppola	Nominated
32nd Golden Globe Awards	Best Motion Picture Actor – Drama	Al Pacino	Nominated
32nd Golden Globe Awards	Most Promising Newcomer – Male	Lee Strasberg	Nominated
32nd Golden Globe Awards	Best Screenplay – Motion Picture	Francis Ford Coppola and Mario Puzo	Nominated
32nd Golden Globe Awards	Best Original Score	Nino Rota	Nominated
9th National Society of Film Critics Awards	Best Director	Francis Ford Coppola	Won
9th National Society of Film Critics Awards	Best Cinematography	Gordon Willis (Also for The Parallax View)	Won
27th Writers Guild of America Awards	Best Drama Adapted from Another Medium	Francis Ford Coppola and Mario Puzo	Won

=== American Film Institute recognition ===
- 1998: AFI's 100 Years...100 Movies – #32
- 2003: AFI's 100 Years...100 Heroes & Villains:
  - Michael Corleone – #11 Villain
- 2005: AFI's 100 Years...100 Movie Quotes:
  - "Keep your friends close, but your enemies closer." – #58
  - "I know it was you, Fredo. You broke my heart. You broke my heart." – Nominated
  - "Michael, we're bigger than U.S. Steel." – Nominated
- 2007: AFI's 100 Years...100 Movies (10th Anniversary Edition) – #32
- 2008: AFI's 10 Top 10 – #3 Gangster Film and Nominated Epic Film

== See also ==
- List of Academy Award records
