= Make one's bones =

American English idiom; to build respect

To "make one's bones" is an American English idiom meaning to take actions to establish achievement, status, or respect. It is an idiomatic equivalent of "establish[ing] one's bona fides".

Although the idiom appears to have originated in the United States criminal underworld, it has since migrated to more popular and less sinister usage; such as discussions of various professions and occupations including law enforcement personnel, the legal profession, and journalists.

== In popular culture ==
The idiom was popularized in the 1969 book The Godfather and its 1972 movie adaptation, for instance when Sonny says "I 'made my bones' when I was nineteen, the last time the family had a war", and when Moe Greene says "I'm Moe Greene! I made my bones when you were going out with cheerleaders!" The term was also used in The Sopranos several times. As in these examples, in organized-crime usage the phrase refers to establishing one's credibility by killing someone.
