= Vito Corleone =

Fictional character from The Godfather

- The Godfather character
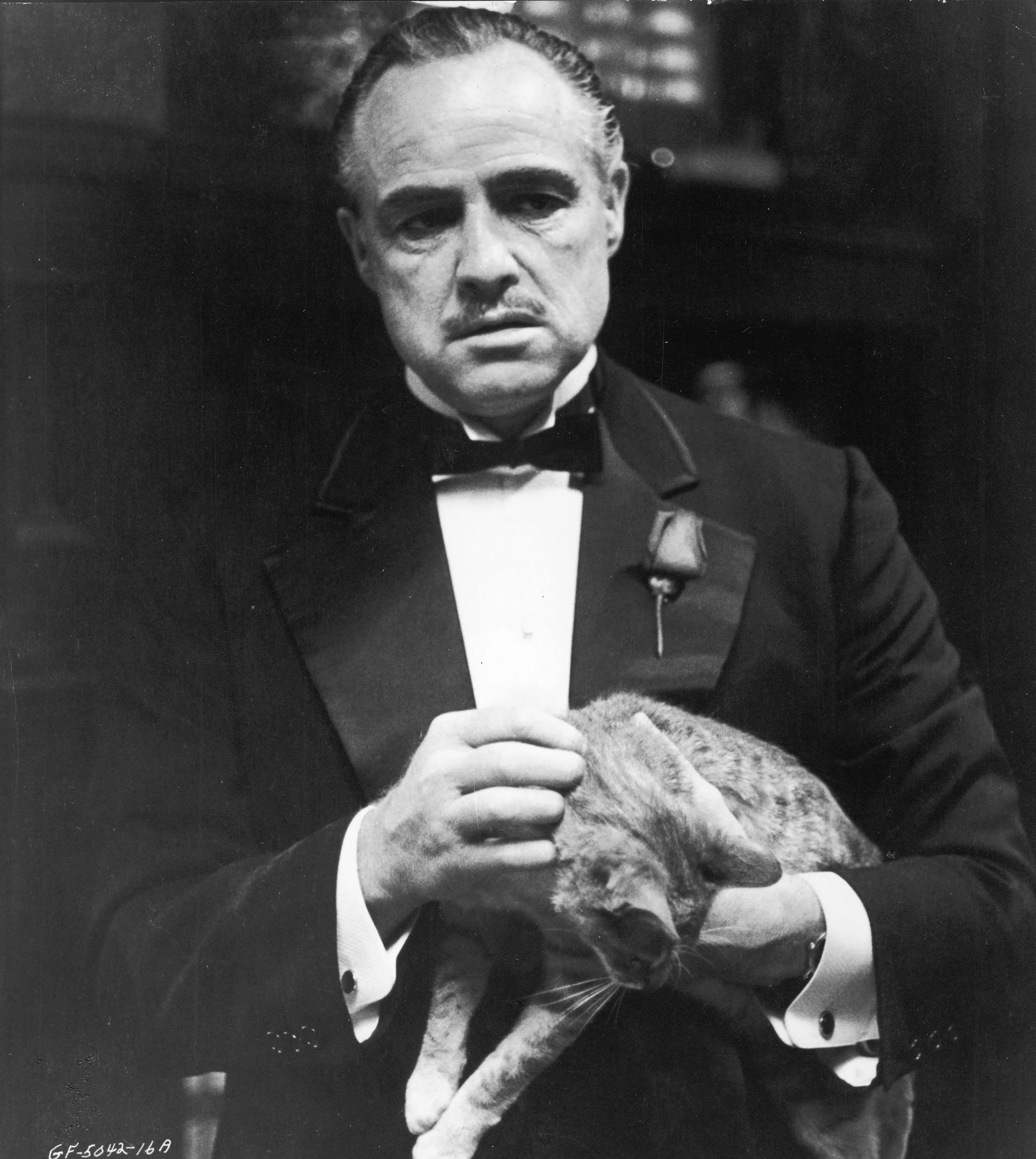
- Marlon Brando as Vito Corleone in the film The Godfather
- First appearance: The Godfather
- Last appearance: The Family Corleone
- Created by: Mario Puzo
- Portrayed by: Marlon Brando (age 53–63); Robert De Niro (age 25–30); Oreste Baldini (child)

In-universe information
- Full name: Vito Andolini Corleone
- Gender: Male
- Title(s): Godfather; Don
- Occupation: Olive oil importer Crime boss
- Affiliation: Corleone family
- Family: Antonio Andolini (father); Paolo Andolini (brother); Stefano Andolini (cousin)
- Spouse: Carmela Corleone (m. 1915–1955)
- Children: Santino "Sonny" Corleone (1916–1950); Thomas "Tom" Hagen (1916–1978/1981) (adopted son); Frederico "Fredo" Corleone (1918–1959); Michael Corleone (1920–1997); Constanzia "Connie" Corleone (1922–?)
- Religion: Roman Catholicism
- Nationality: Italian, American

Vito Corleone (né Andolini) is a fictional character and a major character in Mario Puzo's 1969 novel The Godfather and the first two films of Francis Ford Coppola's film trilogy. The titular "Godfather", Vito is portrayed by Marlon Brando in the 1972 film The Godfather, with Oreste Baldini portraying him as a child and Robert De Niro portraying him as a young man in The Godfather Part II (1974). An orphaned Italian immigrant from Sicily, Vito rises through the criminal underworld to become the head of the Corleone crime family.

Vito and his wife, Carmela, have four children: three sons, Santino ("Sonny"), Fredo, and Michael ("Mike"), and a daughter, Constanzia ("Connie"). He also informally adopts Sonny's childhood friend, Tom Hagen, who later becomes the family's lawyer and consigliere. Following Vito's death, Michael succeeds him as don of the Corleone crime family.

Vito oversees a criminal empire involved in gambling, bootlegging, and union corruption, while maintaining a public reputation as a generous and respected man. He follows a strict personal code centered on loyalty, friendship, family, and reciprocity. A traditionalist who places great importance on respect and personal relationships, Vito commands considerable authority within both his family and the criminal underworld. Even those closest to him generally address him as "Don Corleone" or "Godfather", rather than by his first name.

== Concept and creation ==
Vito Corleone is based on a composite of mid-20th-century New York Mafia figures Carlo Gambino, Frank Costello, Joe Bonanno, and Joe Profaci.

Maria Le Conti Puzo, Mario Puzo's mother, was also a basis for the author's depiction of Vito. In 2019, Francis Ford Coppola wrote:

Mario told me that all of the great dialogue, those quotable lines he put into the mouth of Don Corleone, were actually spoken by Mario's mother. Yes, "an offer he can't refuse," "keep your friends close but your enemies closer," "revenge is a dish that tastes best when it is cold," and "a man who doesn't spend time with his family can never be a real man," among many others, were sayings he heard from his own mother's lips. Mario later wrote, "Whenever the Godfather opened his mouth, in my own mind I heard the voice of my mother. I heard her wisdom, her ruthlessness, and her unconquerable love for her family and life itself. Don Corleone's courage and loyalty came from her, his humanity came from her.

== Fictional biography and early years ==
The character's story begins as Vito Andolini in Corleone, Sicily, in the Kingdom of Italy. In the novel, he was said to be born on April 29, 1887, which his tombstone reads in the first film; however, the second film establishes his birthdate as December 7, 1891. In 1901, the local Mafia chieftain, Don Ciccio, orders Vito's father Antonio murdered when he refuses to pay him tribute. Paolo, Vito's older brother (presumably ret-conned as the one born in 1887), swears revenge, but Ciccio's men kill him too. Vito's mother begs Ciccio to spare Vito, but Ciccio refuses, reasoning the boy will seek revenge as a grown man. Upon Ciccio's refusal, Vito's mother holds a knife to Ciccio's throat, allowing her son to escape while Ciccio's men kill her. Ciccio's men roam the neighborhood demanding that they give up Vito, prompting family friends to smuggle Vito out of Sicily for his safety. They put him on a ship with immigrants traveling to America. At Ellis Island, an immigration official renames him Vito Corleone presumably by mistake, using his village for his surname. He later uses Andolini as his middle name in acknowledgment of his family heritage.

Vito is taken in by his distant relatives, the Abbandando family, in Little Italy on New York's Lower East Side. Vito grows very close to the Abbandandos, particularly their son, Genco, who is like a brother to him. Vito earns an honest living at the Abbandandos' grocery store, but the elder Abbandando is forced to fire him when Don Fanucci, a blackhander and the local neighborhood padrone, demands that the grocery hire his nephew.

A young Vito (played by Robert De Niro) kills Don Fanucci

In 1920, Vito is befriended by small-time criminals Peter Clemenza and Salvatore Tessio, who teach him how to survive by fencing stolen dresses and performing favors in return for loyalty. Fanucci learns of Vito's operation and demands a cut of his illegal profits or he will report Vito and his partners to the police. Vito then devises a plan to kill Fanucci. During the festival of Saint Rocco, Vito trails Fanucci from Little Italy's rooftops, jumping from one building to the next, as Fanucci walks home. Vito enters Fanucci's building and shoots him in the chest, face and mouth, killing him. Vito then takes over the neighborhood, treating it with far greater respect than Fanucci did.

Vito and Genco start the Genco Pura Olive Oil Company, an olive oil importing business that eventually becomes the largest in the country. Genco Pura also serves as the main legal front for Vito's growing organized crime syndicate. With Fanucci's rackets as the foundation, he organizes his growing criminal interests as the Corleone crime family. Genco Abbandando is his consigliere, and Clemenza and Tessio are caporegimes. Between Genco Pura and his illegal operations, Vito becomes a wealthy man. In 1922, he returns to Sicily for the first time since fleeing as a child. He and his partner Don Tommasino systematically eliminate Don Ciccio's men who were involved in murdering Vito's family and arrange a meeting with Ciccio himself. The elderly Ciccio is nearly blind and deaf, and fails to recognize the now adult Vito. When Ciccio asks him to approach, he reveals himself to be the son of Antonio Andolini and kills the elderly Don by carving open his stomach, thus avenging his family. Tommasino takes over the town and is the family's staunchest ally in the old country for the next half-century.

By the early 1930s, Vito is the most powerful Mafia boss in the country. As a boy, Vito's oldest son, Sonny, brings his friend Tom Hagen, a homeless orphan, to stay with the Corleones and Vito unofficially adopts him. As an adult, Sonny becomes a capo, Vito's heir apparent and de facto underboss. Fredo, Vito's second-born son, is deemed too weak and unintelligent to handle important family business and takes on only minor responsibilities. Vito has a difficult relationship with his youngest son, Michael, who wants nothing to do with the family business. Michael enlists to fight in World War II against Vito's wishes. When Michael is wounded in combat, Vito pulls strings to have him honorably discharged and sent back to the U.S., without Michael's knowledge.

Around 1939, Vito moves his home and base of operations to Long Beach, New York on Long Island, where Genco serves as his most trusted adviser until he is stricken with cancer and can no longer fulfill his duties. Hagen, who by now has become a practicing attorney, takes Genco's place.

Vito prides himself on being careful and reasonable, but does not completely forsake violence. When his godson, singer Johnny Fontane, wants to be released from his contract with a bandleader, Vito offers to buy out his remainder for the sum of $10,000, but the bandleader refuses. Vito then makes the bandleader "an offer he can't refuse." While fearsome personal enforcer Luca Brasi put a gun to the bandleader's head, Vito tells the bandleader that either his signature or his brains will be on the contract. In the end, Vito buys out the contract; now for just $1,000.

== The Godfather ==
In 1945, Vito hosts Connie's wedding to small-time criminal Carlo Rizzi, and honors the Sicilian tradition of granting favors on his daughter's wedding day. He agrees to have Clemenza's men beat up two college students who sexually assaulted family friend Amerigo Bonasera's daughter, and to send Hagen to Hollywood to persuade movie mogul Jack Woltz to cast Fontane in his latest movie. When Woltz refuses, he wakes up to find the severed head of his prize race horse, Khartoum, in his bed; it is implied that Vito ordered the horse killed.

Soon afterward, heroin kingpin Virgil Sollozzo asks Vito to invest in his operation. Sollozzo is backed by the rival Tattaglia and Barzini families, and wants Vito's political influence and legal protection. Vito declines, believing the politicians and judges on his payroll would turn against him if he engaged in drug trafficking. During the meeting, Sonny expresses interest in the deal; after the meeting, Vito chastises his son for letting an outsider know what he was thinking. Shortly afterward, as Vito goes to buy oranges from a fruit stand, Sollozzo's hitmen emerge with guns drawn. Vito runs for his Cadillac, but is shot five times. Fredo, who had been accompanying Vito, drops his gun and is unable to return fire as the assassins escape (the murder of Frank Scalice inspired the assassination attempt on Vito).

Vito survives, however, so Sollozzo makes a second assassination attempt at the hospital. Mark McCluskey—a corrupt police captain on Sollozzo's payroll—has removed Vito's bodyguards, leaving him unprotected. However, Michael arrives moments before the imminent attack. Realizing his father is in danger, Michael has Vito moved to another room, and affirms his loyalty at Vito's bedside.

While Vito recovers, Sonny serves as acting head of the family. Michael, knowing his father will never be safe while Sollozzo lives, convinces Sonny to let him murder Sollozzo and McCluskey. At an arranged meeting at an Italian restaurant in the Bronx, Michael retrieves a handgun planted by Clemenza in the bathroom and shoots both men dead. Michael is then smuggled to Sicily under the protection of Vito's longtime friend and business partner Don Tommasino. The deaths of Sollozzo and McCluskey ignite a war between the Corleone and Tattaglia families, with the other New York families backing the latter. After Sonny is killed by Barzini's men, Vito resumes control and brokers a peace accord among the families, during which he realizes that Barzini masterminded the attempt on his life and Sonny's murder.

Michael returns home to become Vito's heir apparent. Michael marries his girlfriend Kay Adams. Vito goes into semi-retirement, making Michael the operating head of the family—something Vito had never wanted for his favorite son. He becomes Michael's informal consigliere, replacing Hagen. Michael persuades Vito that it is time to remove the family from organized crime. At the same time, Michael and Vito secretly plan to eliminate the other New York dons, while allowing them to whittle away at Corleone family interests to lull them into inaction.

Vito warns Michael that Barzini will set Michael up to be killed under the guise of a meeting; Barzini will use one of the Corleone family's most trusted members as an intermediary. Shortly afterwards, on July 29, 1955, Vito dies of a heart attack in his garden while playing with his grandson, Michael's son Anthony. In the novel, his last words are, "Life is so beautiful."

At Vito's funeral, Tessio inadvertently reveals that he is the traitor when he tells Michael that Barzini wants a meeting and that he can set it up on his territory in Brooklyn, where Michael would presumably be safe. Days later, Michael eliminates the other New York dons in a wave of assassinations. Michael also orders Tessio and Rizzi murdered for conspiring with Barzini, along with Las Vegas mobster Moe Greene, who has been stonewalling Michael's efforts to buy casinos. In one stroke, the Corleone family regains its status as the most powerful criminal organization in the country.

== Sequel novels ==
Vito appears in both The Godfather Returns, Mark Winegardner's 2004 sequel to Puzo's novel, and The Family Corleone, a 2012 novel by Ed Falco. These novels explore his rise to power in the 1920s and 1930s and his early relationships with his wife and children. He also appears in The Sicilian, acting as a guide for Michael while he is in Sicily.

== Family ==
- Carmela Corleone – wife, played by Morgana King and Francesca De Sapio
- Santino "Sonny" Corleone – eldest son; played by James Caan
- Frederico "Fredo" Corleone – middle son; played by John Cazale
- Michael Corleone – youngest son; played by Al Pacino
- Constanzia "Connie" Corleone – daughter; played by Talia Shire
- Tom Hagen – informally adopted son, played by Robert Duvall
- Francesca Corleone – granddaughter, twin of Kathryn Corleone
- Kathryn Corleone – granddaughter, twin of Francesca Corleone
- Frank Corleone – grandson
- Santino Corleone, Jr. – grandson
- Vincent Corleone – grandson; played by Andy García
- Anthony Corleone – grandson; played by Franc D'Ambrosio and James Gounaris as a child
- Mary Corleone – granddaughter; played by Sofia Coppola
- Victor Rizzi – grandson
- Michael Rizzi – grandson; played by infant Sofia Coppola

== Portrayals and influences ==
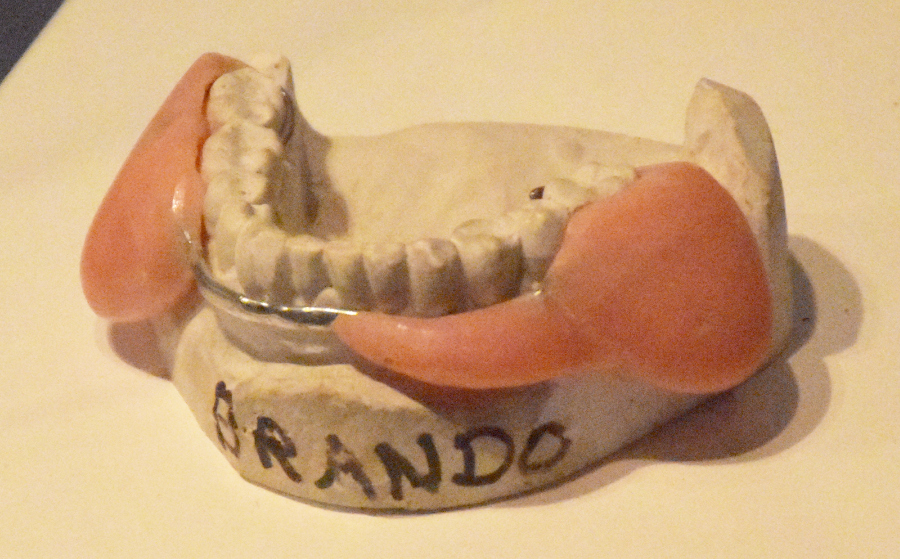
"Dental plumper" prosthetic worn by Marlon Brando to create the appearance of jowls during filming of The Godfather

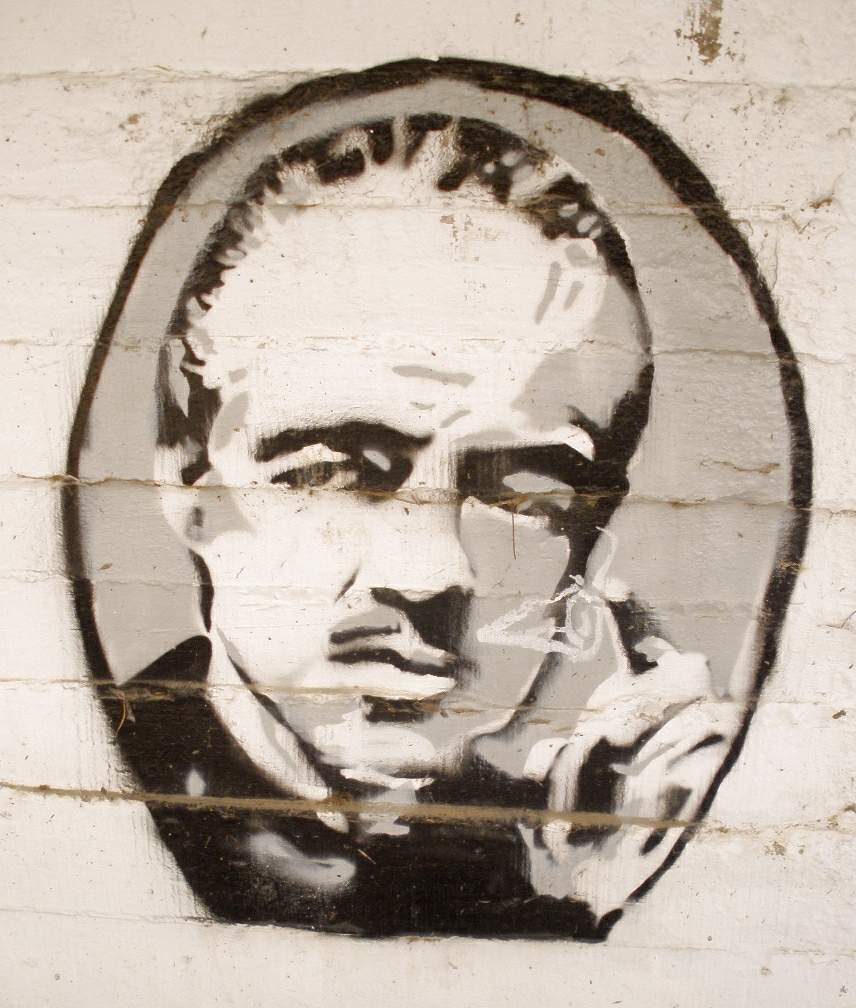
Graffiti in Legutio, Spain

In The Godfather, Don Vito Corleone was portrayed by Marlon Brando. He was portrayed as a boy by Oreste Baldini and as a younger man in The Godfather Part II by Robert De Niro. Brando and De Niro's performances won Academy Awards — Best Actor for Brando, Best Supporting Actor for De Niro. Brando declined his Oscar. He sent Sacheen Littlefeather to accept the award on his behalf, who said Brando declined it because of "the treatment of American Indians today by the film industry ... and also with recent happenings at Wounded Knee."

Marlon Brando envisaged the character to have bulldog-like jowls (hanging cheeks). In his auditions, he stuffed Kleenex tissues between his lower lips and teeth to create this appearance, which were replaced by a custom-made "plumper" oral prosthetic during filming.

For 47 years, Vito Corleone was the only role in history to have two Academy Awards won for playing it. This record was finally matched by Joaquin Phoenix winning the 2019 Best Actor Award for the role of The Joker in the film Joker, following Heath Ledger's win for Best Supporting Actor of 2008 for The Dark Knight. Since then, the role of Anita in West Side Story has also matched this feat by winning multiple Oscars for Best Supporting Actress, the first for Rita Moreno in 1961 and then for Ariana DeBose in 2021.

Premiere Magazine listed Vito Corleone as the greatest film character in history. He was also selected as the 53rd greatest film character by Empire.

Star Wars character Marlo was inspired by Marlon Brando's portrayal of Vito Corleone, appearing among the Hutt Council in Star Wars: The Clone Wars.

== Parodies and references in other media ==
Marlon Brando himself parodied Vito Corleone as Carmine Sabatini in the 1990 film The Freshman.

Preceded by None Seized control of NYC crime family after murder of Don Fanucci	Head of the Corleone crime family The Godfather ca. 1920–1945	Succeeded by Sonny Corleone (acting)
Preceded by Sonny Corleone (acting)	Head of the Corleone crime family The Godfather ca. 1946–1955	Succeeded by Michael Corleone
