= Michael Corleone =

Fictional character from The Godfather

- The Godfather character
- Michael Corleone, as portrayed by Al Pacino in The Godfather
- First appearance: The Godfather
- Last appearance: The Godfather's Revenge
- Created by: Mario Puzo
- Portrayed by: Al Pacino; Louis Marino (as a child)

In-universe information
- Alias: The Godfather
- Nicknames: Mike; Mikey; The Don; College Boy (Sonny occasionally refers to Michael as College Boy)
- Gender: Male
- Title: Don Corleone
- Occupation: U.S. Marine Captain; Crime boss
- Affiliation: Corleone family
- Family: Vito Corleone (father); Carmela Corleone (mother); Santino "Sonny" Corleone (brother); Frederico "Fredo" Corleone (brother); Constanzia "Connie" Corleone (sister); Tom Hagen (adopted brother)
- Spouses: Apollonia Vitelli (1947–1948; deceased); Kay Adams (1951–1959; divorced)
- Children: Anthony Corleone; Mary Corleone
- Relatives: Francesca Corleone (niece); Kathryn Corleone (niece); Frank Corleone (nephew); Santino Corleone, Jr. (nephew); Vincent Mancini (nephew); Victor Rizzi (nephew); Michael Rizzi (nephew); Sandra Corleone (sister-in-law); Carlo Rizzi (brother-in-law); Deanna Dunn (sister-in-law)
- Religion: Catholic
- Rank: Captain
- Service/years & battles: 1941–1945 (World War II) Awards: Navy Cross Silver Star (Later upgraded to Navy Cross) Navy and Marine Corps Medal Purple Heart Asiatic-Pacific Campaign Medal European–African–Middle Eastern Campaign Medal World War II Victory Medal
- Alma Mater: Dartmouth College

Michael Corleone is a fictional character and the protagonist of Mario Puzo's 1969 novel The Godfather, as well as the villain protagonist of the movie trilogy it launched. In the three Godfather films, directed by Francis Ford Coppola, Michael was portrayed by Al Pacino, for which he was twice nominated for Academy Awards. Michael is the youngest son of Vito Corleone, a Sicilian immigrant who builds a Mafia empire. Upon his father's death, Michael succeeds him as the don of the Corleone crime family.

In June 2003, Michael Corleone was recognized as the 11th most iconic villain in film history by the American Film Institute, although some critics consider him to be a tragic hero. The British film magazine Empire selected Michael Corleone as the 11th greatest movie character, with Pacino's performance as Michael Corleone widely regarded as one of the greatest performances in cinematic history.

== Family ==
Born on March 23, 1920, to Mafia don Vito Corleone (Marlon Brando) and his wife Carmela (Morgana King), Michael has two older brothers, Santino "Sonny" Corleone (James Caan) and Frederico "Fredo" Corleone (John Cazale), and a younger sister, Constanzia "Connie" Corleone (Talia Shire). The family consigliere, Tom Hagen (Robert Duvall), is their informally adopted brother.

== The Godfather ==
In his novel The Godfather, Puzo introduces Michael with the following physical description: "He did not have the heavy, Cupid-shaped face of [his siblings], and his jet black hair was straight rather than curly. His skin was a clear olive-brown that would have been called beautiful in a girl. He was handsome in a delicate way." Later in the novel, Puzo writes, "Michael was not tall or heavily built but his presence seemed to radiate danger."

Michael initially wants nothing to do with the Corleone "family business", and enrolls at Dartmouth College in order to escape any potential involvement in crime. (Unbeknownst to Michael, his father does not want him to be involved in the family's criminal enterprise, either, hoping instead that his favorite son would go into politics.) After the United States' entry into World War II in 1941, Michael enlists in the Marines and fights in the Pacific, even though his father had expended great effort to wrangle a deferment for him. For his bravery in battle, Michael is awarded the Navy Cross and featured in Life magazine in 1944. The following year, Michael is discharged as a Captain to recover from his wounds. Michael returns home to attend Connie's wedding at the end of August accompanied by Kay Adams (Diane Keaton), his college sweetheart. Michael stays for a few weeks, intending to re-enter college without telling his family.

Just before Christmas 1945, Vito is critically wounded in an assassination attempt by drug kingpin Virgil Sollozzo (Al Lettieri), pushing Michael into the Mafia world he has avoided for so long. Arriving at the hospital, he finds his bedridden father unprotected from potential attack. While awaiting Corleone reinforcements, Michael prevents a second assassination attempt on Vito by Sollozzo, then affirms his loyalty to his father. Captain Mark McCluskey (Sterling Hayden), a corrupt NYPD captain on Sollozzo's payroll, breaks Michael's jaw before more Corleone button men arrive.

As Vito recuperates, Sollozzo requests that Michael broker a truce, but acting boss Sonny, suspecting a trap, refuses and demands the other Mafia families hand over Sollozzo to the Corleone family or else face war. Michael volunteers to meet Sollozzo in a public place in order to kill him and McCluskey. Hagen warns that killing McCluskey would violate a long-standing Mafia rule not to kill police officers, and says it would incite deadly backlash from rival Mafia families and law enforcement. Michael argues that they can publicly expose McCluskey to the reporters on their payroll as a corrupt cop involved in the drug trade. He also argues that since McCluskey is serving as Sollozzo's bodyguard, he has crossed into their world and is fair game. Sonny agrees and approves the hit.

After careful preparation, Michael meets with Sollozzo and McCluskey at an Italian restaurant in The Bronx. He retrieves a handgun that Corleone caporegime Peter Clemenza (Richard Castellano) had planted beforehand in the bathroom and kills Sollozzo and McCluskey at point-blank range. This ignites the New York underworld's first Mafia war in a decade.

Michael escapes to Sicily and spends two years under Corleone ally Don Tommasino's (Corrado Gaipa) protection. Michael falls in love with and marries a young local woman named Apollonia Vitelli (Simonetta Stefanelli). Back in the United States, Sonny is murdered. After Michael is notified of Sonny's murder, he and Apollonia prepare to move to Siracusa, but she is killed by a car bomb meant for Michael, proving the other Mafia families know where he is hiding.

Michael returns to the United States in 1950 and assumes Sonny's role as Vito's heir apparent. After Vito's suspicions are confirmed that Don Emilio Barzini (Richard Conte), his main rival in New York City, is the mastermind of his shooting and Sonny's murder, he and Michael begin a secret, complex plot to wipe out the other New York Dons. They deliberately allow their rivals to whittle away at Corleone interests to lull them into inaction. Meanwhile, Michael convinces his father that it is time to remove the family from crime. More than a year following his return, Michael reunites with Kay and they marry. He promises her the Corleone family will be completely legitimate in five years. Within three years, they have two children, Anthony and Mary.

Vito semi-retires in 1951, and Michael becomes operating head of the family. He offers to buy out casino owner Moe Greene's (Alex Rocco) stake in the Las Vegas casino the Corleones bankrolled, intending to move the family to Nevada as part of his effort to legitimize the Corleone interests; Greene refuses to sell. Corleone family caporegimes Salvatore Tessio (Abe Vigoda) and Clemenza request permission to begin operating their own families in Corleone territory. Michael, with Vito's support, advises them to be patient and wait until the move to Las Vegas is completed. Tessio and Clemenza agree, but are clearly dissatisfied.

In 1955, Vito warns Michael that Barzini will likely attempt to assassinate Michael under the pretense of negotiating peace between the families, using a disloyal contact within the Corleone regime. Whoever approaches Michael about the meeting, Vito explains, will be the traitor within the family. Shortly thereafter, Vito dies of a heart attack while playing with his grandson Anthony in his tomato garden.

At Vito's funeral, Tessio tells Michael that Barzini wants to arrange a meeting, confirming Vito's prediction. Michael sets his plan in motion to murder the other New York Mafia heads: Barzini, Philip Tattaglia (Victor Rendina), Carmine Cuneo (Rudy Bond), and Victor Stracci (Don Costello), as well as Greene. The plot unfolds on the same day Michael stands as godfather to Connie's newborn son, Michael Francis Rizzi. Later the same day, he has Tessio and Carlo Rizzi (Gianni Russo), Connie's abusive husband who conspired in Sonny's murder, executed. In one stroke, Michael re-establishes the Corleone family as the nation's most powerful crime family and establishes a reputation as being even more cunning and ruthless than his father.

A few days later, Connie furiously accuses Michael of murdering Carlo. When challenged by Kay, Michael denies having ordered Carlo's murder. Kay, initially believing Michael, later observes him receiving his capos. Clemenza addresses Michael as "Don Corleone" and kisses his hand in the same manner that he did with Michael's father. Kay realizes Connie's accusations were true, and that Michael has become his father's successor in every way. Also in the novel, Kay leaves Michael, but Hagen persuades her to return.

== The Godfather Part II ==
The Godfather Part II is set in 1958 and 1959. The Corleone family has moved to Nevada, while capo Frank Pentangeli (Michael V. Gazzo) runs the family's operations in New York, Clemenza having died a few years before. While Michael's many enemies and growing obsession with revenge keep him tethered to the criminal underworld, he still plans to finally legitimize the family by negotiating with Hyman Roth (Lee Strasberg), his father's former business partner, over controlling casino operations in Cuba.

Hours after Anthony's First Communion party, assassins open fire on the Corleone house, nearly killing Michael and Kay. Michael suspects Roth ordered the hit, and believes a traitor within the Corleone family aided him. To uncover Roth's involvement, Michael maintains their business relationship, and orders Pentangeli to settle a dispute with Roth's business partners, the Rosato Brothers. When Pentangeli meets with them, they try to kill him, but he survives.

Michael, Roth, and Fredo travel to Cuba to forge a partnership with Fulgencio Batista allowing them to operate casinos in Cuba without interference in exchange for generous payments to the Cuban government. Michael sends his bodyguard to eliminate Roth on New Year's Eve, but Cuban soldiers kill the bodyguard during the attempt. That same night, Fredo unintentionally reveals that he was the traitor within the family; Michael confronts Fredo and gives him the Sicilian "kiss of death". During the New Year's Eve festivities, victorious rebel forces enter Havana, forcing Batista into exile and ruining Michael's plans. Fredo, afraid of his brother, runs off, while Roth escapes to Miami.

Meanwhile, Pentangeli, believing Michael had ordered a hit on him, prepares to testify against him in the Senate's investigation of organized crime. However, Michael has Pentangeli's brother Vincenzo (Salvatore Po) brought from Sicily. Just before the hearing, Vincenzo and Frank exchange glances. Understanding the threat, Pentangeli recants his earlier sworn statements, throwing the hearings into chaos and destroying the government's case against Michael.

Fredo confesses to Michael that Roth's right-hand man, Johnny Ola (Dominic Chianese), had promised to reward him for information about Michael. Fredo also says that he resents being "passed over" to head the family in favor of Michael, and that he withheld key information about the Senate investigation. Michael disowns Fredo and tells his assassin Al Neri (Richard Bright) that nothing is to happen to his brother while their mother is alive — the implication being that Neri is to kill Fredo after she dies.

Meanwhile, Kay decides to leave Michael and take their children with her, believing Michael will always live in a world of crime and violence. Michael asks her to reconsider, but Kay reveals she aborted their unborn son because she refused to bring another of his children into the world. Enraged, Michael hits Kay in the face and severs ties with her, taking custody of Anthony and Mary.

After their mother's death, and at Connie's behest, Michael seemingly forgives Fredo, but it is a ploy; Neri soon murders Fredo while Michael watches from his den. Michael sends Hagen to persuade Pentangeli to commit suicide to spare his family, and has caporegime Rocco Lampone (Tom Rosqui) kill a heavily guarded Roth at Idlewild Airport upon his return to the United States.

The film ends as Michael recalls a surprise birthday party for his father on December 7, 1941. In a flashback scene, Michael informs the family that he has dropped out of college to enlist in the Marines. Only Fredo supports Michael's decision. When Vito arrives off-screen, everyone goes to greet him except Michael, who sits alone. The film closes with Michael sitting alone in the Corleones' Lake Tahoe compound.

== The Godfather Part III ==
The Godfather Part III is set from 1978–1980. Michael has moved back to New York, abandoned the Nevada estate, and taken great strides to remove the family from crime, turning over his New York criminal interests to longtime enforcer Joey Zasa (Joe Mantegna). Wracked with guilt over his ruthless rise to power, particularly his order to kill Fredo, Michael uses his wealth to rehabilitate his reputation through acts of charity, administered by a foundation named after his father.

A decade earlier, he had given custody of his two children to Kay, who has since remarried. He sells his gambling interests to other Mafia families and reorganizes his vast legitimate business holdings as the "Corleone Group".

The Holy See has named him a Commander of the Order of Saint Sebastian for his charitable works and large donations to Catholic institutions. At the ceremony, Michael and Kay have an uneasy reunion after nine years. Kay supports their son Anthony's (Franc D'Ambrosio) ambition to reject the "family business" and become an opera singer, and tells Michael that both she and Anthony know the truth about Fredo's death. Michael had previously wanted Anthony to finish law school or join the family business, but now consents to Anthony going his own way.

Michael's new connection to the Church provides an opportunity to take over the large property company Immobiliare. He is already its largest shareholder, and offers to buy the Vatican's 25 percent share, which will give him a controlling interest. He also takes in Sonny's illegitimate son Vincent Mancini (Andy Garcia), a soldier in Zasa's crew, as his protégé. Nevertheless, Michael is distressed by Vincent's fiery temper, and disapproves of his romance with Michael's daughter Mary (Sofia Coppola).

On the night Michael announces he is dissolving his gambling empire, Zasa wipes out most of The Commission in a helicopter attack in Atlantic City. Michael escapes with help from Vincent and Neri. Michael realizes that his old friend Don Altobello (Eli Wallach) is the brains behind the attempt on his life. Traumatized by the attack, Michael suffers a diabetic stroke, briefly incapacitating him. (Francis Ford Coppola reveals in his audio commentary that Michael is frequently seen drinking water in the first two films—subtle hints that he is a diabetic.)

With Michael still bedridden, Connie gives Vincent consent to assassinate Zasa. Disguised as an NYPD mounted officer, Vincent kills Zasa in the middle of an Italian street festival. Michael is infuriated upon learning of the hit, and demands that no similar orders be issued while he is alive.

Michael returns to Sicily for Anthony's operatic debut at the Teatro Massimo. Suspecting that Altobello may make another attempt on his life, he has Vincent infiltrate Altobello's regime under the pretense of defecting. Michael and Kay tour Sicily together, during which Michael asks for Kay's forgiveness. Kay admits she will always love him, and they begin to rekindle their relationship.

Meanwhile, the Immobiliare deal has stalled, supposedly because the critically ill Pope Paul VI must personally approve it. Michael learns that the Immobiliare deal is an elaborate swindle concocted by Immobiliare chairman Licio Lucchesi (Enzo Robutti), who schemed with Vatican Bank head Archbishop Gilday (Donal Donnelly) and accountant Frederick Keinszig (Helmut Berger) to embezzle a fortune from the Vatican Bank, using Michael's "investment" to cover their tracks. Hoping to salvage the deal, Michael seeks Don Tommasino's assistance. He directs Michael to Cardinal Lamberto (Raf Vallone), the future Pope John Paul I. With Lamberto's prodding, Michael makes his first confession in 30 years, tearfully breaking down as he admits to ordering Fredo's murder. Lamberto tells Michael he deserves to suffer for his terrible sins, but that there is hope for his redemption.

John Paul I dies soon after being elected pope, poisoned by Gilday. Michael learns that Altobello (in league with the conspirators) has hired an assassin named Mosca (Mario Donatone) to kill him. Mosca murders Tommasino, and Michael vows before his old friend's casket to sin no more. Vincent reports that Lucchesi, working with Altobello, is behind the assassination attempts on Michael.

Weary of the bloody, lonely life of a Don, Michael retires, making Vincent his successor, but not before giving him permission to retaliate. In return, Vincent agrees to end his relationship with Mary. That night, Michael, reconciled with Kay and Anthony, watches his son's performance in the opera Cavalleria Rusticana. Meanwhile, Vincent has Lucchesi, Gilday, and Keinszig murdered, while Connie murders Altobello with a poisoned cannoli.

After the performance, Mosca shoots Michael, wounding him, and a second bullet hits Mary, killing her. Mary's death breaks Michael's spirit, and he screams in agony over her body. In an epilogue scene set many years later, an elderly Michael dies alone in the same courtyard where he married Apollonia.

In the December 2020 release of The Godfather Coda: The Death of Michael Corleone, Coppola's canonical recut of the third film, the final scene is re-edited to portray Michael sitting alone in the courtyard without showing his death.

== The Sicilian ==
Michael is a secondary character in Puzo's novel The Sicilian, which takes place during his first exile in Sicily. He learns from Clemenza about the legendary exploits of the novel's main character, Salvatore Guiliano (In the novel, the spelling of Salvatore Giuliano's name was intentionally changed by Puzo to "Guiliano".), and is eager to meet him, but Giuliano is murdered before the meeting can take place.

== Sequel novels ==
Michael appears in Mark Winegardner's sequel novels The Godfather Returns and The Godfather's Revenge. In Godfather Returns, set roughly during the time of Godfather Part II, Michael battles with a new rival, disgruntled Corleone capo Nick Geraci, while attempting to legitimize the family. In The Godfather's Revenge, set a few years after the second film, he moves to protect his criminal empire against Geraci and the machinations of a powerful political dynasty, while dealing with the collapse of his marriage and his guilt over having Fredo murdered. In the latter novel, he has a relationship with actress Marguerite "Rita" Duvall in the early 1960s, but he ends it upon realizing that he is still in love with Kay.

== Family members ==
- Vito Corleone – Michael's father and head of the Corleone crime family, played by Marlon Brando in The Godfather, and by Robert De Niro in flashback scenes in Part II
- Carmela Corleone – Mother, played by Morgana King in The Godfather Part I and Part II, and by Francesca De Sapio in flashback scenes in Part II
- Tom Hagen – Adopted brother and consigliere, played by Robert Duvall
- Santino "Sonny" Corleone – Eldest brother, underboss to Vito, played by James Caan in The Godfather Part I, and by Roman Coppola in flashback scenes from Part II
- Constanzia "Connie" Corleone – Younger sister, played by Talia Shire
- Frederico "Fredo" Corleone – Elder brother, underboss to Michael; played by John Cazale
- Apollonia Vitelli-Corleone – First wife, played by Simonetta Stefanelli
- Kay Adams Corleone – Second wife, played by Diane Keaton
- Anthony Corleone – Son, played by Anthony Gounaris in The Godfather, by James Gounaris in Part II, and by Franc D'Ambrosio in Part III
- Mary Corleone – Daughter, played by an uncredited actress in Part II, and by Sofia Coppola in Part III
- Vincent Corleone – Nephew and succeeding Don, played by Andy García

== Bibliography ==
- Puzo, Mario (1969). The Godfather. New York City: G. P. Putnam's Sons. ISBN 978-0451205766.
- Coccimiglio, Carmela (2006). "I'm with You Now. I'm with You...": Michael Corleone as Gangster Figure in Mario Puzo's and Francis Ford Coppola's The Godfather Texts. Ontario, Canada: Lakehead University. ISBN 978-0-494-31189-9.
- Messenger, Chris (February 1, 2012). The Godfather and American Culture: How the Corleones Became "Our Gang". Albany, New York: SUNY Press. p. 31. ISBN 978-0-7914-8870-6.
- Coppola, Francis Ford (2004). Francis Ford Coppola: Interviews. Jackson, Mississippi: University Press of Mississippi. p. 27. ISBN 978-1-57806-666-7.
- Bondanella, Peter E. (2004). Hollywood Italians: Dagos, Palookas, Romeos, Wise Guys, and Sopranos. London, England: A&C Black. p. 244. ISBN 978-0-8264-1544-8.
- Tamburri, Anthony Julian; Giordano, Paolo; Gardaphe, Fred L. (2000). From the Margin: Writings in Italian Americana. West Lafayette, Indiana: Purdue University Press. p. 406. ISBN 978-1-55753-152-0.

Preceded by Vito Corleone	Head of the Corleone crime family The Godfather c 1955–1958	Succeeded by Tom Hagen (Interim)
Preceded by Tom Hagen (Interim)	Head of the Corleone crime family The Godfather c 1959–1980	Succeeded by Vincent Corleone
