= Vincent Corleone =

Fictional character from The Godfather series

- The Godfather character
- Andy Garcia portraying Vincent Corleone
- First appearance: The Godfather Part III
- Created by: Mario Puzo; Francis Ford Coppola
- Portrayed by: Andy García

In-universe information
- Alias: Vincent Mancini (birth name)
- Nickname: Vinnie
- Gender: Male
- Title(s): Boss; Soldato
- Occupation: Crime boss
- Family: Corleone
- Relatives: Vito Corleone (paternal grandfather); Carmela Corleone (paternal grandmother); Fredo Corleone (paternal uncle); Michael Corleone (paternal uncle); Connie Corleone (paternal aunt); Anthony Corleone (cousin); Mary Corleone (cousin)
- Father: Sonny Corleone
- Mother: Lucy Mancini
- Half-brothers: Frank Corleone; Santino Corleone, Jr.
- Half-sisters: Francesca Corleone; Kathryn Corleone
- Born: 1948

Vincent Santino Corleone (né Mancini) is a fictional character in the 1990 feature film The Godfather Part III. He is portrayed by Andy García, who was nominated for an Academy Award for his performance.

Vincent is the illegitimate son of Sonny Corleone and his mistress Lucy Mancini. He eventually succeeds his uncle Michael as head of the Corleone family. In Mario Puzo's original 1969 novel Lucy did not conceive a child with Sonny.

Coppola has said that Vincent is an amalgamation of the five Corleone family males, having his grandfather Vito's cunning, his father Sonny's temper, his uncle Michael's ruthlessness, his uncle Fredo's sensitivity, and his uncle Tom Hagen's absolute loyalty.

== Fictional character biography ==
=== The Godfather Part III ===
In The Godfather, married Sonny Corleone and his sister's bridesmaid Lucy Mancini, were having an illicit affair; Vincent Mancini is the result of that union. Being illegitimate (because his parents were unmarried), he was not included in the Corleone family as a youth. As an adult, when Michael Corleone offers Vincent employment in one of the family's legitimate businesses, Vincent declines, preferring to work for Joey Zasa, who runs the remnants of the Corleone family's criminal empire in New York City. Vincent is eventually embroiled in a feud with Zasa when he senses that Zasa is trying to usurp Michael's power. Michael tries to make peace between the two, but this fails; Zasa calls Vincent a bastard, and Vincent bites his ear. That night Zasa sends two hitmen to kill Vincent, but Vincent kills them instead after forcing one of them to reveal who hired them.

Vincent attempts to ingratiate himself with his uncle by protecting him from rival Mafia families, who are in league with Zasa and an unknown traitor within Michael's circle. Encouraged by his sister Connie, Michael takes Vincent under his wing. Michael admires Vincent's courage and loyalty, but notices that Vincent has inherited Sonny's hot temper and worries he will suffer his father's fate.

Vincent saves Michael from an assassination attempt organised by Zasa at a Mafia summit in Atlantic City. That same night, Michael is hospitalized following a diabetic stroke. Believing Zasa will make another attempt on Michael's life, Vincent murdered him (with approval from Connie and assassin Al Neri). Michael is angry that Vincent used violence to deal with Zasa and did so without his permission, although he used the same logic to protect his father 34 years prior by killing Virgil Sollozzo.

When Vincent begins a relationship with Michael's daughter Mary, Michael fears that his nephew's growing involvement in the family's criminal activity will endanger her life. Michael tells Vincent that while he and Sonny were different, he knew Sonny would've done anything for him and warns Vincent that Sonny's temper clouded his judgment, and doesn't want Vincent to repeat the same error.

When Michael learns that his old friend Don Altobello is the traitor within the family, he has Vincent spy on him. Vincent learns that Licio Lucchesi, a powerful Italian politician and criminal underworld figure, was the mastermind of the assassination plot against Michael and employed Altobello, Zasa, a corrupt Vatican official Frederick Keinszig, and Archbishop Gilday to undermine Michael's criminal empire.

Vincent asks permission to retaliate and Michael tacitly agrees, then formally retires and names Vincent as his successor, insisting that he call himself Don Vincent Corleone. Michael's guidance has made Vincent into a better man - patient, responsible, and wise.

Vincent's first act is to order the murders of Lucchesi, Keinszig, and Gilday. Connie kills Altobello (her godfather) by poisoning him. In return for being made Don, Vincent agrees to end his relationship with Mary. That same night, Altobello's assassin, Mosca, accidentally kills Mary during an attempt on Michael's life, and Vincent kills Mosca with a single gunshot. He looks on, devastated, as Michael cradles Mary’s dead body.

=== Abandoned sequel ===
What follows in Vincent's story, according to author Mario Puzo and director Francis Ford Coppola, is unknown. In The Godfather Part III DVD commentary, Coppola explains that both he and Puzo had envisioned a story depicting Vincent's reign as head of the Corleone family during the 1980s, still haunted by Mary's murder. Vincent, deviating from his predecessors' moral code, would have entered the family into the drug trade, driving the Corleone clan back into corruption and eventual decline and ending with his being killed similarly to Colombian drug lord Pablo Escobar.

This proposed film would have been titled either The Godfather Part IV or The Godfather: The Final Part. Flashbacks would include Vito Corleone's early days as Don, and the childhood days of Sonny, Fredo, Michael, and Connie Corleone, when they discover the precise nature of their father's business. The film would have portrayed the early days of Tom Hagen, Luca Brasi, and Johnny Fontane, and Vito's first meeting with Hyman Roth. According to Coppola, Puzo had composed a rough draft alternating between Vincent's reign as boss and the "Happy Years" of 1926–1939; passages from the original novel not previously incorporated into the movie storylines. Leonardo DiCaprio, Luis Guzmán, Ray Liotta, and García himself all expressed interest in the film. However, this project has lain dormant since Puzo's death in 1999.

== Family ==
- Sonny Corleone — father
- Lucy Mancini — mother
- Francesca Corleone — paternal half-sister
- Kathryn Corleone — paternal half-sister
- Frank Corleone — paternal half-brother
- Santino Corleone, Jr. — paternal half-brother
- Vito Corleone — paternal grandfather
- Carmela Corleone — paternal grandmother
- Fredo Corleone — paternal uncle
- Michael Corleone — paternal uncle
- Constanzia "Connie" Corleone — paternal aunt
- Anthony Corleone — paternal cousin
- Mary Corleone — paternal cousin/lover
- Victor Rizzi — paternal cousin
- Michael Rizzi — paternal cousin

Preceded by Michael Corleone	Head of the Corleone crime family 1980–unknown	Succeeded by Unknown
