= Connie Corleone =

Fictional character from The Godfather series

- The Godfather character
- Connie Corleone as portrayed by Talia Shire in The Godfather Part III
- First appearance: The Godfather
- Last appearance: The Godfather's Revenge
- Created by: Mario Puzo
- Portrayed by: Talia Shire

In-universe information
- Full name: Constanzia Corleone
- Gender: Female
- Family: Corleone family
- Spouses: Carlo Rizzi (deceased; 1945–1955); Ed Federici (divorced); Merle Johnson (divorced)
- Children: Victor Rizzi; Michael Francis Rizzi
- Relatives: Francesca Corleone (niece); Kathryn Corleone (niece); Frank Corleone (nephew); Santino Corleone Jr.(nephew); Vincent Mancini (nephew); Anthony Corleone (nephew); Mary Corleone (niece)
- Father: Vito Corleone
- Mother: Carmela Corleone
- Brothers: Sonny Corleone; Fredo Corleone; Michael Corleone; Tom Hagen (adopted brother)

Constanzia "Connie" Corleone, also known as Connie Corleone Rizzi, is a fictional character in The Godfather, a 1969 novel by Mario Puzo, and the subsequent film series. In the films, Connie is portrayed by Talia Shire, the younger sister of the director Francis Ford Coppola. Shire was nominated for the Academy Award for Best Supporting Actress for her portrayal of Connie Corleone in The Godfather Part II.

== The Godfather ==
In the film The Godfather, Connie, born in 1925, is the youngest child and only daughter of Mafia don Vito Corleone and his wife Carmela. She is the sister of Sonny, Fredo, and Michael Corleone. Tom, who was adopted by the Corleone family, is her adoptive brother. In 1945, she marries Sonny's friend Carlo Rizzi. Vito disapproves of the match, as Carlo's mother is from Northern Italy rather than Sicily, and only agrees to the marriage on the condition that they have a traditional Sicilian wedding.

Puzo characterizes Carlo as "a punk sore at the world", and his angry behavior is exacerbated by the Corleone family shunting him aside after the marriage. Once they were married, Carlo began to mistreat her, stealing the marriage purse and spending it on frivolities (booze, drugs and prostitutes), as well as beating her regularly. Connie begged for her father to intervene, but he coldly refused to help, seemingly to punish Connie. In truth, Vito is outraged at how Connie is being treated, but feels powerless to act. Longstanding Italian tradition forbids a father — even one as powerful as Vito — from interfering in his daughter's marriage. Vito worries his son-in-law will be unable to discharge his "duties as a husband" if he fears the family. Vito instead has Carlo secretly watched. While Vito sent Sally Rags to keep an eye on the small sports book Carlo ran, he took no action to reprimand his son-in-law. This perceived inaction only emboldens Carlo to become more abusive. Connie is hurt and confused by this seeming indifference. However, Sonny, Fredo, Michael and Tom all grew to resent Carlo for how he treated their sister, especially Sonny, who became physically violent with Carlo. Vito refuses to intervene and he strictly forbids anyone in the family from retaliating against Carlo.

Sonny obeys his father's command not to interfere until he visits Connie and finds her sobbing and battered after one particularly violent beating, during which Connie was pregnant with her son Victor. Sonny flew off in a rage and beat Carlo severely in the street near his bookmaking offices. Sonny actually let up on Carlo after it was apparent that he wouldn't defend himself. Only the hand of the Don had prevented him from doing so earlier, as Vito was still bed-ridden at this time.

Several months later, Connie took a phone call from one of Carlo's girlfriends who was canceling a date with Carlo that evening, which prompted a violent argument. After Carlo gave her a severe beating, Connie called Sonny in a state of terror and, completely enraged, he left the Corleone mall to find Carlo. While en route, he was ambushed and assassinated at the toll booth at the Jones Beach Causeway.

Michael returns from Sicily and assumes Sonny's place as Vito's heir apparent. Connie and Carlo's relationship seems to improve and they have a second child. Following Vito's death, Michael becomes the new Don and avenges Sonny's murder by having Carlo garroted by caporegime Peter Clemenza, one part of a wave of murders orchestrated by Vito and Michael to eliminate their enemies. Connie (who was unaware of her husband's role in Sonny's murder), hysterical after Carlo's death, blames Michael, denouncing him in front of his wife, Kay. In the novel, Connie quickly recovers from Carlo's demise, apparently relieved to be rid of an abusive, philandering husband. Days later, she apologizes to Michael for her outburst and assures Kay that Michael is blameless. Kay initially believes both Connie and Michael, but later learns her husband did have Carlo killed, along with the other Mafia heads.

== The Godfather Part II ==
In the film The Godfather Part II, set three years after the first movie, Connie is still angry at Michael. Two months after Carlo's death, Connie began a series of meaningless affairs and marriages just to spite Michael and deal with her grief over the murder of her husband, such as her engagements to both Ed Federici and Merle Johnson, even borrowing money and abandoning her two children. She was married and divorced at least once before 1958. However, she came back to the family after their mother Carmela's death, as well as to help Michael take care of Anthony and Mary after Michael and Kay split up. Connie helped Kay see her children in secret on at least one occasion. At this time, Fredo had been outcast from the family due to his involvement with Hyman Roth and Johnny Ola. Connie convinced Michael to accept him again, but this was only a front, and he ordered Fredo's death soon afterwards. Connie seemed to accept the story that Fredo had drowned out on Lake Tahoe.

== The Godfather Part III ==
In the movie The Godfather Part III, set 20 years after the second film, Connie has become one of Michael's closest advisors, gradually assuming an active role in Corleone Family operations. She encourages Michael to bring Sonny's illegitimate son Vincent Mancini into the Corleone family and support him in his feud with Joey Zasa.

When Michael suffers a diabetic stroke following an attempt on his life, Connie and Michael's bodyguard and Underboss Al Neri gives Vincent the approval to kill Zasa, who was an accomplice in the attack. Michael is furious that Connie gave an order behind his back, but maintains that it was necessary to strike fear into his enemies and prevent further hit attempts upon himself. In a hospital room meeting with Vincent, Neri, and Connie, rather than simply ordering Connie to stay out of illegal Corleone Family activities, Michael demands — and gets — her agreement to abide by his decisions, essentially granting her authority in family operations subject only to his own.

Connie travels with the Corleone family to Palermo, Sicily to watch Anthony's operatic debut. Now acting with full authority, Connie tells Vincent to prepare a counterattack if Michael is killed. She then stands at Michael's side when he retires and names Vincent his successor. She attends the opera, along with the entire Corleone family. Upon discovering that her godfather Don Altobello is the mastermind of the plot against their family, she kills him by giving him a gift of poisoned cannoli.

Connie is distraught when her niece Mary is killed by an assassin who intended to kill Michael.

The Italian-language version of The Godfather Part III changes Connie's name's spelling to the far more standard and common "Costanza" rather than keeping the original "Constanzia", which is rare and archaic in Italy.

== Character ==
Connie is Vito's only daughter and has been described as his favorite child, next to Michael. Connie attempts to have her family accept Carlo in the first film, and is, at least initially, devastated by his murder, despite the abuse she suffered at his hands. Talia Shire described her character as "'a pain-in-the-ass, whiny person' in the shadow of all-powerful men."

In The Godfather Part II, Connie has become an irresponsible social climber, paying scant attention to her sons while speeding through two superficial marriages, much to the disapproval of Michael.

With Vito and Sonny dead, and Fredo proving incapable of serving as any family authority figure, Connie must beg Michael for money to support her party-girl lifestyle. Following the death of matriarch Carmela Corleone, Connie apparently abandons her materialistic ways, and returns to the now-divorced Michael to assume a supportive role in his household.

By the events of The Godfather Part III, Connie has become more decisive and self-sufficient, apparently having accepted the need for Michael to have eliminated Carlo.

Although still feigning ignorance of the true circumstances of Fredo's death, she rationalizes it with Michael as "God's will."

She also feels confident enough to take an active role in family business: offering advice to Michael and stepping into the gap to make active family decisions while he recovers from a diabetic stroke.

Connie even takes an active part in the climactic sequence in which the Corleone Family strikes back against its enemies, when she executes a scheme to eliminate Don Altobello with a poisoned cannoli.

=== In other media ===
Connie appears as a supporting character in Mark Winegardner's sequel novels The Godfather Returns and The Godfather's Revenge.

A retelling of the Godfather story from Connie Corleone's perspective was authorized by the estate of Puzo and is set to be published in 2027.

== Family ==
- Vito Corleone — Father
- Carmela Corleone — Mother
- Santino 'Sonny' Corleone — Brother
- Tom Hagen — Adopted brother
- Fredo Corleone — Brother
- Michael Corleone — Brother
- Kay Adams Corleone — Sister-in-law
- Anthony Corleone — Nephew
- Mary Corleone — Niece
- Vincent Mancini — Nephew
- Carlo Rizzi — First husband
- Victor Rizzi — Son
- Michael Francis Rizzi — Son
