= Moe Greene =

Fictional character from The Godfather series

- Alex Rocco as Moe Greene
- First appearance: The Godfather
- Last appearance: The Godfather
- Created by: Mario Puzo
- Portrayed by: Alex Rocco

In-universe information
- Title: Enforcer
- Occupation: Casinos' proprietor, mobster, hitman (formerly)
- Family: Roth Syndicate; Barzini crime family (ties); Murder, Inc. (formerly)

Morris "Moe" Greene is a fictional character appearing in Mario Puzo's 1969 novel The Godfather and the 1972 film of the same title. Both Greene's character and personality are based on Bugsy Siegel: his affiliation with the mob in Los Angeles, his involvement in the development of Las Vegas, and his flamboyant tendencies. Greene is portrayed in the movie by Alex Rocco.

== The Godfather ==
Greene is introduced in The Godfather as a renowned Jewish mobster and former executioner for Murder, Inc. He is credited with the development of gambling and entertainment in Las Vegas and bringing the interests of the most powerful organized crime organizations in America to Nevada. Greene is in business with Don Vito Corleone, who bankrolls the creation of Greene's first hotel-casino. In return, Greene takes the Don's second son, Fredo Corleone, under his wing during the war among the Five Families in New York, with the Molinari Family guaranteeing Fredo's safety. Although Fredo is greatly influenced by both Greene and the city, family heir Michael Corleone disapproves of the effect it has on his brother, whom Greene reportedly chastised and slapped around in public.

At a discreet meeting with Greene, Michael expresses his disapproval and makes an offer to buy out Greene's entire interest in the casino as part of the Corleones' relocation to Nevada. Offended, Greene angrily refuses, claiming that the Corleones have neither the favor nor the power required to drive him out of the business and are only moving to Las Vegas because the other families are chasing them out of New York. In the film, he also belittles Michael's credentials as a Don, saying, "I made my bones when you were going out with cheerleaders!"

In the novel, Greene is murdered shortly afterward by Al Neri. At the end of the film, Michael has Greene killed as part of his slaughter of the Corleone family's enemies. An unknown assassin surprises Greene while he is getting a massage and shoots him through the eye. This allows Greene's casinos to become property of the Corleone family.

== The Godfather: Part II ==
Greene's death also plays a part in the second film in the series. Greene was a childhood friend to Michael's business partner and rival Hyman Roth, and it is implied that Roth's anger over Greene's murder is one motivation for his plan to destroy Michael Corleone.

== Legacy ==
Alex Rocco's portrayal of Greene "cemented Rocco's place in Hollywood mob cinema". Greene's character and death scene have been described as "iconic". Greene's death is loosely based on the murder of mobster Bugsy Siegel.

The phrase "Moe Greene special", execution by being shot through the eye, has appeared in other gangster shows, including The Sopranos, in the episode "Meadowlands".

In 1998, he inspired the title of an Off-Broadway drama, Moe Greene Gets It in the Eye.
