= Fredo Corleone =

Fictional character from The Godfather series

- The Godfather character
- John Cazale as Fredo Corleone
- First appearance: The Godfather
- Last appearance: The Godfather Part II
- Created by: Mario Puzo
- Portrayed by: John Cazale

In-universe information
- Nicknames: Fredo, Freddie
- Title(s): Soldier, Capo, Underboss
- Occupation: Mobster, Hotel & Casino Manager, Brothel Owner
- Family: Corleone family
- Spouse: Deanna Dunn-Corleone
- Children: One son with Marguerite "Rita" Duvall
- Father: Vito Corleone
- Mother: Carmela Corleone
- Brothers: Sonny Corleone; Michael Corleone; Tom Hagen (adopted brother)
- Sister: Connie Corleone

Frederico "Fredo" Corleone is a fictional character in Mario Puzo's 1969 novel The Godfather. Fredo is portrayed by American actor John Cazale in the Francis Ford Coppola 1972 film adaptation and in the 1974 sequel, The Godfather Part II.

Fredo is the second son of the Mafia don Vito Corleone (Marlon Brando and Robert De Niro). Fredo is the younger brother of Sonny (James Caan) and the elder brother of Michael (Al Pacino) and sister, Connie (Talia Shire). Corleone family consigliere Tom Hagen (Robert Duvall) is his informally adopted brother.

The character of Fredo is more indecisive than his brothers and lacks their determination. As a result, he has little power or status within the Corleone crime family. In the novel, Fredo's primary weakness is his womanizing, a habit he develops after moving to Las Vegas and which earns his father's disfavor. In the films, Fredo's feelings of personal inadequacy and his inability to act effectively on his own behalf are character flaws leading to his demise.

== Appearances ==
=== The Godfather ===
In a pivotal scene in the novel and film, Fredo is with his father when assassins working for drug kingpin Virgil Sollozzo (Al Lettieri) gun down Don Corleone in the street. Fredo, terrified, fumbles and drops his gun, failing to return fire. He sits on the curb next to his severely wounded father, weeping. In the novel, Fredo is sickened after witnessing his father being shot, going into shock. To aid Fredo's recovery and protect him from possible reprisals, Sonny sends his younger brother to Las Vegas under the protection of Don Anthony Molinari of San Francisco. While in Las Vegas, Fredo learns the casino trade and becomes acquainted with former hitman Moe Greene (Alex Rocco), who runs a major Vegas hotel that the Corleone family bankrolled. Fredo regularly seduces the casino’s cocktail waitresses, to the point that customers cannot get their drink orders on time. This angers Greene, who ends up slapping Fredo in public on at least one occasion.

After Sonny is killed, Vito chooses Michael as his successor of the Corleone family. This creates a lasting rift between the two surviving brothers. When Michael learns that Greene slapped Fredo, he confronts Greene but is dismayed when Fredo comes to Greene's defense. When Fredo berates Michael for being hostile to Greene, Michael warns Fredo to never take sides against their family again.

=== The Godfather Part II ===
By the beginning of The Godfather Part II, Fredo has become Michael's underboss, though he has only nominal power. During a large family gathering, Fredo is unable to control his intoxicated wife, Deanna Dunn (Marianna Hill). In a deleted scene, from the beginning, Deanna humiliates Fredo in front of the guests by asking him why he is so afraid of his "little brother" (Michael), considering Fredo to be his "errand boy". When she dances and flirts with another man, he drags her off the dance floor and threatens to hit her. Deanna drunkenly mocks him until one of Michael's bodyguards hauls her away with Fredo's permission.

Consigliere Tom Hagen is ordered to bring Senator Pat Geary (G. D. Spradlin) under the Corleone Family's control to gain his assistance in obtaining gambling licenses. After Geary tries to extort money from Michael, Geary is implicated in a prostitute's murder, which the film implies was set up by Michael to bring the senator to heel. Hagen offers the Corleone family's help in covering up the prostitute’s murder in exchange for Geary's "friendship". Hagen tells Geary that Fredo operates the brothel, and "it will be as if she never existed". Geary agrees to their terms.

Fredo later betrays Michael after being approached by Johnny Ola (Dominic Chianese), an associate of rival crime boss Hyman Roth (Lee Strasberg). Ola and Roth tell Fredo that Michael is being particularly difficult in business negotiations between Roth's organization and the Corleone family. Fredo secretly agrees to aid them in exchange for compensation. Shortly afterward, an attempt is made on Michael's life. The film does not reveal what specific assistance Fredo provides Ola and Roth against Michael, how much he knew of their intentions, or what he was offered in return.

While in Havana negotiating with Roth, Michael discovers that Fredo is the family traitor behind the assassination attempt on him. After telling Michael that he has never met Ola, a drunk Fredo later carelessly tells Geary that he had been to a nightclub with Ola. Michael overhears the conversation and realizes that Fredo betrayed him to Roth. He confronts Fredo, delivering the kiss of death. Amid the chaos of American-backed dictator Fulgencio Batista fleeing Fidel Castro's rebel army, Michael pleads with Fredo to leave the country with him. Frightened and remembering that Carlo Rizzi was promised the same but executed anyway, Fredo runs away into the crowd. Michael's men eventually locate Fredo and convince him to return home.

Michael is subpoenaed by a Senate subcommittee investigating organized crime. Michael's former caporegime, Frank Pentangeli (Michael V. Gazzo), is scheduled to testify against Michael at the hearing. A few days before the hearing, Michael asks Fredo what he knows regarding Roth's plans. Fredo claims that he did not know they would make an attempt on Michael's life, and that if he helped Roth, "there was something in it for me - on my own". He angrily tells Michael that he resents being passed over to succeed their father; he believes that, as the older brother, he should have taken over the family business after Vito's death. When pressed by Michael, Fredo reveals that the Senate commission's lawyer is on Roth's payroll. Michael disowns Fredo, and privately instructs his personal assassin Al Neri (Richard Bright) that nothing is to happen to Fredo while their mother is alive; the implication being that Fredo will be killed after her death. At their mother's funeral, and at their sister Connie's urging, Michael seemingly forgives Fredo; however, this is shown to be a ruse, as Michael exchanges a glance with Neri, signaling that Fredo is to be killed. Soon after, while Fredo and Neri are fishing on Lake Tahoe, Neri executes Fredo while Michael watches from his house.

Fredo makes a final appearance in the movie's penultimate scene, a flashback to Vito’s birthday party in December 1941. It emerges that Fredo was the only family member to support Michael's decision to drop out of college and join the Marines after the attack on Pearl Harbor.

=== The Godfather Part III ===
Fredo appears only once in the third film, in a flashback depicting his death through archival footage. He is also mentioned many times throughout the film; the dialogue makes it clear that Michael is tormented with guilt over ordering his brother's death, and that it has alienated him from his ex-wife, Kay (Diane Keaton), and his son, Anthony (Franc D'Ambrosio), both of whom know the truth about Fredo's death. The official explanation of Fredo's death, as related by Connie, is that he drowned, although it is left ambiguous whether Connie actually believes this. Michael himself cries out Fredo's name while having a diabetic stroke. Later in the film, he breaks down in tears while confessing having ordered Fredo's death to Cardinal Lamberto (Raf Vallone), who later becomes Pope John Paul I. Michael's daughter, Mary (Sofia Coppola), asks her cousin and love interest, Vincent Corleone (Andy García), if Michael had Fredo killed, but Vincent says it is "just a story" and changes the subject.

=== Sequel novels ===
==== In The Godfather Returns ====
Mark Winegardner's novel The Godfather Returns further expands upon the character of Fredo Corleone. It includes explanations for some questions left open by the films, such as the details of Fredo's betrayal of Michael in The Godfather Part II, and how, as was revealed in The Godfather Part III, Anthony knew the truth about Fredo's death.

The novel reveals that Fredo is bisexual and has several secret trysts with men, and it also implies that he was molested as a child by his parish priest. Rival gangster Louie Russo exploits rumors of Fredo's sexuality to make Michael look weak, and tries to have Fredo killed while he is with a male lover. The novel also reveals that, in San Francisco, Fredo beats one of his lovers to death after the man recognizes him from a newspaper photo. Hagen covers up the resulting scandal by claiming Fredo killed the man in self-defense. Fredo also has liaisons with many women, having "knocked up half the cocktail waitresses in Las Vegas". He meets showgirl Marguerite "Rita" Duvall, who Johnny Fontane sent to his room as a prank. Though hesitant, they have sex, and Fredo pays her to tell Johnny it was the best she had ever had.

At Colma during the funeral for Don Molinari of San Francisco, Fredo gets the idea of setting up a necropolis in New Jersey. The Corleone family would buy the former cemetery land, now prime real estate, and also be a silent partner in the graveyard business. Fredo proposes his plan to Michael, wanting to impress him and prove his worth to the family. Michael, however, dismisses the plan as unrealistic.

Fredo arrives at the Corleone Christmas party with Deanna Dunn, a fading movie starlet. A few months later they are married. Dunn gets Fredo bit parts in some of her movies. Later, in September 1957, Fredo's Hollywood connections allow him to get his own unsuccessful TV show, The Fred Corleone Show, which airs irregularly, usually on Monday nights, until his death. Meanwhile, Fredo's alcoholism worsens. He discovers Deanna cheating on him with her co-star and shoots up the car he bought her. When Deanna's co-star tries to attack him, Fredo knocks him unconscious and is arrested. Hagen bails him out, and they get in an argument about Fredo's recklessness and Hagen's blind loyalty to Michael. Despite this, Hagen gets Fredo cleared by claiming the incident was self-defense.

Roth, Ola, and traitorous Corleone family caporegime Nick Geraci use Fredo as a pawn to eliminate Michael. Geraci and Ola meet with Fredo, who is blind drunk after having a fight with his wife, and promise to make his necropolis idea a reality in return for information about Michael. Fredo supplies them with information about the Corleone family, particularly financial interests.

Fredo's death plays out as it was filmed in The Godfather Part II. Fredo is helping Anthony onto a small boat to go fishing, and as they are about to shove off, Anthony is called back to the house by Connie to go to Reno with his father. He actually never leaves and instead, he is sent to his room, where, from his window, he sees Fredo and Neri out on the lake. Anthony hears a gunshot and sees Neri returning alone, explaining Godfather Part III's revelation that Anthony knows the truth about his uncle's death.

==== In The Godfather's Revenge ====
In Winegardner's 2006 sequel novel, The Godfather's Revenge, Fredo appears in one of Michael's dreams. In the dream, Fredo warns Michael about an unspecified threat, and asks him why he had his own brother killed. Much of the novel portrays Michael dealing with his guilt over Fredo's murder.

In the final chapter of the book, Michael learns that Fredo had an illegitimate child with Michael's ex-girlfriend Rita Duvall.

== Family ==
- Vito Corleone — Father; played by Marlon Brando in The Godfather and by Robert De Niro in The Godfather Part II
- Carmela Corleone — Mother; played by Morgana King
- Santino "Sonny" Corleone — Older brother; played by James Caan
- Constanzia "Connie" Corleone — Sister; played by Talia Shire
- Michael Corleone — Younger brother; played by Al Pacino
- Tom Hagen — Adopted brother; played by Robert Duvall
- Mary Corleone — Niece; played by Sofia Coppola
- Anthony Corleone — Nephew; played by Anthony Gounaris in The Godfather, played by James Gounaris in The Godfather Part II, played by Franc D'Ambrosio in The Godfather Part III
- Vincent Mancini — Nephew; played by Andy García.

== In popular culture ==
- In reference to Fredo Corleone being the weaker and less intelligent of his brothers, the term "Fredo" has come to refer to a weak member of a group, especially one of a number of siblings in a family, regardless of ethnicity.
- The official website of Donald Trump's 2020 presidential campaign offered "Fredo Unhinged" T-shirts following a viral YouTube video of CNN television journalist Chris Cuomo taking offense to being called "Fredo" by an apparent stranger, claiming it to be an ethnic slur. Cuomo's comparison of the usage of "Fredo" to an ethnic slur caused debate on Twitter. Edward Falco, the author of 2012 novel The Family Corleone, said he agreed with Cuomo that "Fredo" was directed as an ethnic slur, not just meaning someone weak and incompetent but a weak and incompetent Italian. It sounds close to "Guido," he said, a more prominent insult toward Italian Americans, though he said Cuomo went "overboard" when he had compared it to the n-word. Others did not agree with his purported claim of it being an ethnic slur. Trump's critics, meanwhile, variously compared Trump's sons Donald Jr. and Eric to Fredo.

== See also ==
- The Godfather (2006 video game) – Fredo appears in the video game, and is voiced by Andrew Moxham. One mission in the game has the player driving Vito Corleone to the hospital after he is shot by Sollozzo's men, while Fredo shoots at the gangsters shooting at the car.
