= Anthony Corleone =

Fictional character from The Godfather series

- The Godfather character
- First appearance: The Godfather
- Last appearance: The Godfather Part III
- Created by: Mario Puzo
- Portrayed by: Anthony Gounaris (The Godfather); James Gounaris (The Godfather Part II); Franc D'Ambrosio (The Godfather Part III)

In-universe information
- Nickname: Tony
- Gender: Male
- Occupation: Opera singer
- Family: Corleone family
- Religion: Roman Catholicism

Anthony Vito "Tony" Corleone is a fictional character in The Godfather film trilogy directed by Francis Ford Coppola. He is the son of Michael Corleone (Al Pacino) and Kay Adams (Diane Keaton), and the older brother of Mary Corleone (Sofia Coppola). While Tony was not a major character in the first two films, major events in his life were the backdrop of key parts of the second film, and his relationship with his father is a plot point in the third film.

He is not mentioned by name in the novel, The Godfather. The film character was given the name Anthony after the three-year-old who portrayed him in the first appearance because he responded better to his own name.

== Fictional character biography ==
=== The Godfather (novel) ===
Michael and Kay are said to have two sons, but neither is mentioned by name.

=== The Godfather (film) ===
Anthony has a small role in the first film; his only scene of consequence is when he witnesses the death of his grandfather, Vito Corleone (Marlon Brando), who dies while playing with him in the garden.

He is portrayed by Anthony Gounaris. The character was given the name Anthony because it was thought that the three-year-old Gounaris would respond best if his own name was used. The Godfather is Gounaris' only role to date.

=== The Godfather Part II ===
The second film's plot line opens in 1958, with Anthony's first communion. It continues with an extravagant banquet held in his honor at the family estate near Lake Tahoe. During it, his father's time is largely taken up with tending to the family business, an ongoing theme throughout the film. Anthony receives many gifts, mostly from people he does not know, which confuses him. Later in the film, he and his sister, Mary, overhear their parents arguing; Kay tells Michael she's taking the children and leaving him. Michael tells her he would never allow that, and that he knows she blames him for a recent miscarriage. She lets him know it was not a miscarriage but an abortion, and that she would never bring another child of his into the world. After striking her, he makes sure she knows she will never take "his" children from him.

After Michael and Kay get divorced, Michael refuses to allow her to see Anthony and Mary. Anthony seems to resent his mother's role in his parents' split, and is sullen and unaffectionate during her visit, arranged secretly by his aunt Connie (Talia Shire), Michael's sister. Michael discovers Kay's unauthorized visit and sends her away coldly. At the end of the film, Anthony has developed a close relationship with his uncle Fredo (John Cazale), Michael's brother. When they are about to go fishing together, Michael calls Anthony away, insisting he accompany him to Reno. Fredo is then assassinated by Al Neri (Richard Bright) on Michael's order.

He is portrayed by James Gounaris, the brother of the first film's actor. He never took another acting role.

=== The Godfather Part III ===
Sometime prior to the events of the film, Michael gave Kay custody of Anthony and Mary so she could supervise their education. Anthony, now an adult, along with his mother and sister, Mary, attends a ceremony where Michael receives a citation from the Pope. At the banquet that follows, Anthony, along with Kay, confronts his father, and tells him that he is quitting law school for a career in opera and will never join the "family business". Michael, infuriated, wants him to finish law school. Michael finally relents at Kay's urging. She privately tells Michael that Anthony knows that he had Fredo killed.

Anthony's career is a success, and he is set to make his operatic debut as the lead in Cavalleria Rusticana, in Palermo, Sicily, on Easter Sunday. His family joins him in Sicily, for the premiere. The day before, as a gift for Michael, he performs the traditional Sicilian ballad "Brucia La Terra" (the official theme of the trilogy). During this trip Anthony, like his father, disapproves of Mary's romance with their cousin Vincent Corleone (Andy García).

The film concludes with Anthony's performance. Although the production is a success, it is overshadowed by numerous murders and assassinations leading up to, during, and following it – most notably, that of his sister Mary, who is accidentally killed by an assassin during an attempt on Michael's life. Anthony is last seen grieving over Mary's body, along with Michael and Kay. He was portrayed by singer Franc D'Ambrosio.

== Sequel novels ==
Anthony appears in Mark Winegardner's sequel novels The Godfather Returns and The Godfather's Revenge. In the former novel, he witnesses Fredo's murder from his bedroom window, explaining the third film's revelation that he knows the truth about his uncle's death. In these novels, Anthony has a difficult relationship with his father; he loves Michael, but does not want to become like him. Anthony's ambivalence hurts Michael, but he understands it, as he had once felt the same way about his own father.
