= Francesca De Sapio =

Italian actress and acting coach

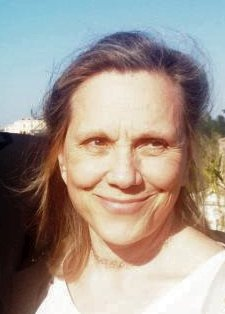

Francesca De Sapio (born 16 August 1945) is an Italian actress and acting coach, best-known as the young Carmela Corleone in The Godfather Part II (1974).

The daughter of an architect, she was born in Rome, Italy. After her father's work took him to the United States, she started studying acting in Texas.

A life-member of the Actors Studio, having studied there under Lee Strasberg, De Sapio began teaching there as well In the early 1980s.

In 1985, she co-founded with Giuseppe Perruccio the Duse Studio in New York City, an international centre for training in acting, film production and theater. In 1987, the Duse Studio moved to Montecatini Terme, Italy, and then to its current base in Rome.
