= The Godfather (novel) =

1969 novel by Mario Puzo

- First edition cover
- Author: Mario Puzo
- Cover artist: S. Neil Fujita
- Language: English
- Series: The Godfather
- Genre: Crime novel
- Publisher: G. P. Putnam's Sons
- Publication date: March 10, 1969
- Publication place: United States
- Pages: 446 pp
- Dewey Decimal: 813.54
- Followed by: The Sicilian

The Godfather is a crime novel by Italian American author Mario Puzo. Originally published on 10 March 1969 by G. P. Putnam's Sons, the novel details the story of a fictional Mafia family in New York City and Long Island, headed by Vito Corleone, the Godfather. The novel covers the years 1945 to 1955 and includes the backstory of Vito Corleone from early childhood to adulthood.

The first in a series of novels, The Godfather is noteworthy for introducing Italian words like consigliere, caporegime, Cosa Nostra, and omertà to an English-speaking audience. It was adapted into the iconic 1972 film of the same name, which won the Academy Award for Best Picture. Two film sequels, featuring original storylines that include contributions by Puzo himself, were released in 1974 and 1990.

== Summary ==
The Corleone family and Five Families form the New York Mafia. After World War II, the families avoid open warfare in favour of mutual cooperation, but the peace is broken after the godfather, Don Vito Corleone refuses to join in a narcotics operation proposed by drug kingpin Virgil Sollozzo of the rival Tattaglia family, and is subsequently shot by men working for Sollozzo. Corleone's oldest son, Santino (Sonny) takes an active role in the family business while Don Vito is recovering in the hospital, with the help of consigliere Tom Hagen and the family's two caporegimes, Peter Clemenza and Salvatore Tessio. Sollozzo then kills Don Corleone's loyal bodyguard and enforcer, Luca Brasi, and pays off the police who are guarding Don Vito in the hospital, in order to kill him. Michael Corleone, Don Vito's youngest son, discovers the plot and removes his father from the hospital room to save him. Shortly after that he murders Sollozzo and his bodyguard, corrupt NYPD Captain Mark McCluskey. To escape retribution Michael has to escape to Sicily, where he hides in the home of a mafia chief. Meanwhile, the conflict in New York escalates into a full-scale war which results in Sonny's murder. Michael must return from Sicily to assume control of the family as the new Don. Under his retired father's tutelage, Michael orchestrates a plan to exact revenge, while relocating the Corleone family's power base to Las Vegas in order to further his goal of legitimizing the family by getting them out of organized crime. The plan encompasses the murder of all of the Corleone family's enemies, including Michael's brother-in-law Carlo Rizzi, who played a part in Sonny's murder. After selling all of the family's remaining businesses in New York, the Corleone family permanently moves to Las Vegas.

== Main characters ==
The Corleone family patriarch is Vito Corleone (the Don), whose surname represents the Sicilian town of his birth, Corleone. His birth name is Vittorio Andolini, but after immigrating to the United States following the deaths of his parents and brother, he changed it to the name of his home village as one of his few acts of sentimentality. Vito fathered four children: Sonny Corleone, Fredo Corleone, Michael Corleone, and Connie Corleone. He also has an informally adopted German-Irish-American son, Tom Hagen, who became the Corleone family's consigliere (counselor). Vito Corleone is also godfather to the famous singer and movie star Johnny Fontane. The godfather referred to in the title is Vito, but the story's main character becomes Michael. The novel's central storyline details Michael's destiny to succeed his father as the head of the family empire, despite his desire to lead an Americanized life with his girlfriend (and eventual wife) Kay Adams.

The Corleone family is a criminal organization with national influence, notably protection, gambling, and union racketeering. Serving as the Don's underboss is his oldest son, Sonny. The operational side of the organization is headed by two caporegimes, Peter Clemenza and Salvatore Tessio. Other significant members of the organization include Connie's abusive husband Carlo Rizzi and enforcers Luca Brasi and Al Neri.

== Reception ==
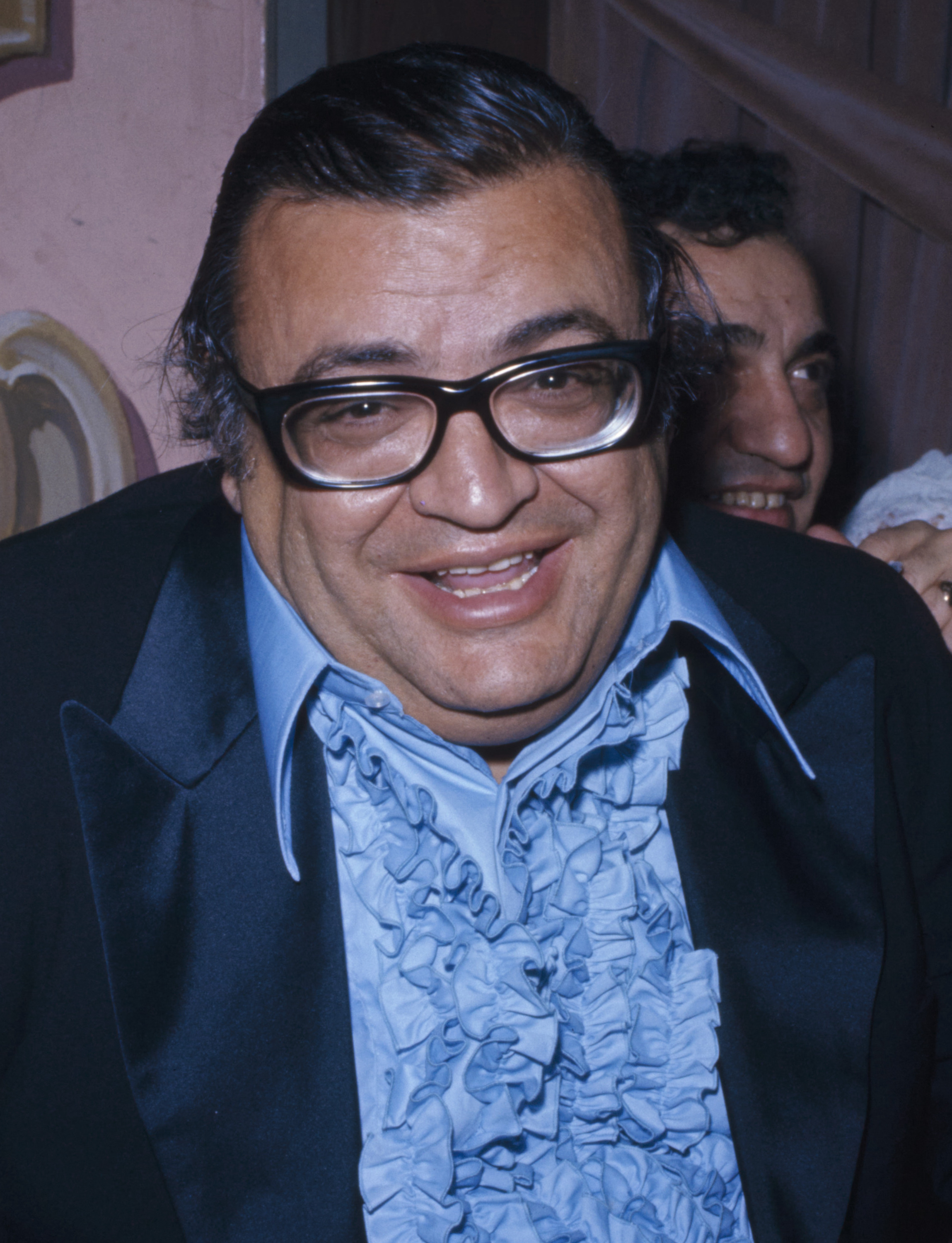
Mario Puzo in 1972

In The New York Times, Roger Jellinek wrote that the book was "bound to be hugely successful, and not simply because the Mafia is in the news. Mr. Puzo's novel is a voyeur’s dream, a skillful fantasy of violent personal power without consequences. The victims of the Corleone 'family' are hoods, or corrupt cops – nobody you or I would actually want to know. Just business, as Don Vito would say, not personal. You never glimpse regular people in the book, let alone meet them, so there is no opportunity to sympathize with anyone but the old patriarch, as he makes the world safe for his beloved 'family.'" The novel remained on The New York Times Best Seller list for 67 weeks and sold over nine million copies in two years.

The novel is #53 on the PBS The Great American Read list of "America's 100 most-loved books". In the UK, the novel was #91 on the 2003 BBC The Big Read list of the top 200 novels in the United Kingdom, based on the goal of finding the "Nation's Best-loved Novel".

== Film adaptation ==
The 1972 film adaptation of the novel was released with Marlon Brando as Don Vito Corleone and Al Pacino as Michael Corleone, directed by Francis Ford Coppola. Mario Puzo assisted with both the writing of the screenplay and other production tasks. The film grossed approximately $269 million worldwide and won various awards, including three Academy Awards, five Golden Globes and one Grammy. The film is considered to be tremendously significant in cinematic history. The sequel, The Godfather Part II won six Oscars, and became the first sequel to win the Academy Award for Best Picture.

The film's plot follows the novel except for such details as backstories of some characters that are excluded, although they were filmed. Some of this footage was included in later re-edited versions, such as "The Godfather Saga." The subplot involving Johnny Fontane in Hollywood was not filmed. The most significant deviation of the film from the novel was that the latter had a more positive ending than the film, in which Kay Corleone accepts Michael's decision to take over his father's business. The film ends with Kay's realization of Michael's callousness, a theme that would develop in the second and third films, which are largely not based on the original novel. Vito Corleone's backstory appeared in the second film, with his character portrayed by Robert De Niro.

== Audio adaptations ==
The novel has had at least two full-cast audio adaptations. The first one was a full-cast audio edition released by Brilliance Audio in 1986. A second full-cast audio adaptation was released by Polish audiobook company Audioteka and stars Janusz Gajos as Don Corleone. A more conventional audiobook recording, also produced by Brilliance Audio, was narrated by Joe Mantegna.

== Sequels ==
In 1984, Puzo's literary sequel to The Godfather was published. Titled The Sicilian, it chronicles the life of "Giuliano" (Salvatore Giuliano) but the Corleone family is featured heavily throughout, Michael Corleone in particular. Chronologically this story sits between Michael's exile to Sicily in 1950 (Book VI) and his return to the United States (Book VII). For copyright reasons, the Corleone family involvement was cut from the Michael Cimino film adaptation, which is not considered part of the Godfather film series.

In 2004, Random House published a sequel to Puzo's The Godfather, The Godfather Returns, by Mark Winegardner. A further sequel by Winegardner, The Godfather's Revenge, was released in 2006. These novels continue the story from Puzo's novel.

The Godfather Returns picks up the story immediately after the end of Puzo's The Godfather. It covers the years 1955 to 1962, as well as providing significant backstory for Michael Corleone's character prior to the events of the first novel. The events of the film The Godfather Part II all take place within the timeframe of this novel, but are only mentioned in the background. The novel contains an appendix that attempts to correlate the events of the novels with the events of the films.

The Godfather's Revenge covers the years 1963 to 1964.

Continuing Puzo's habit, as seen in The Godfather, of featuring characters who are close analogs of real-life events and public figures (as Johnny Fontane is an analog of Frank Sinatra), Winegardner features in his two Godfather novels analogs of Joseph, John F. and Robert F. Kennedy, as well as alleged organized crime figure Carlos Marcello (Carlo Tramonti). In The Godfather Returns, Winegardner also dramatizes the sweep of organized crime arrests that took place in Apalachin, New York, in 1957.

Winegardner uses all of the characters from the Puzo novels and created a few of his own, most notably Nick Geraci, a Corleone soldier who plays a pivotal role in the sequel novels. Winegardner further develops characters from the original novel, such as Fredo Corleone, Tom Hagen, and Johnny Fontane.

In 2012, a prequel, based on an unproduced screenplay by Mario Puzo titled The Family Corleone, was written by Ed Falco. It tells the story of how Vito Corleone rises to Don and how Sonny Corleone and Tom Hagen enter the family business.

A retelling of the story from Connie Corleone's perspective was authorized by the estate of Puzo and is set to be published in 2027.

== Literary references ==
The Corleone family closely resembles the Karamazov family in The Brothers Karamazov: a powerful father, an impulsive oldest son, a philosophical son, a sweet-tempered son, and an adopted stepson who is maintained as an employee. Honoré de Balzac's novel Le Père Goriot (1835) has been the inspiration for notable lines that have gained wide popularity in cinema history. Similarly, Puzo opened his 1969 novel with an epigraph popularly attributed to Balzac: "Behind every great fortune there is a crime." The saying is most likely evolved over time from Balzac's original text: "The secret of a great success for which you are at a loss to account is a crime that has never been found out because it was properly executed."

"I'm gonna make him an offer he can't refuse" was included in both the original Puzo novel and in the film adaptation. It is the second-ranking cinematic quote included in AFI's 100 Years...100 Movie Quotes (2005) by the American Film Institute. Its origin may be from the same work of Balzac that is the source of the opening epigraph. Balzac wrote of Vautrin telling Eugene: "In that case, I will make you an offer that no one would decline."

== Real-life influences ==
Large parts of the novel are based upon reality, notably the history of the "Five Families", the Mafia organization in New York and the surrounding area. The novel also includes many allusions to real-life mobsters and their associates. For example, Johnny Fontane is based on Frank Sinatra, and Moe Greene on Bugsy Siegel. In addition, the character of Vito Corleone was a composite of real-life organized crime bosses Frank Costello and Carlo Gambino.
