= The Godfather (novel series) =

Crime novel series

The Godfather is a series of crime novels about Italian-American Mafia families, most notably the fictional Corleone family, led by Don Vito Corleone and later his son Michael Corleone. The first novel, The Godfather, written by Mario Puzo, was released in 1969. It was adapted into a series of three feature films, which became one of the most successful franchises in film history.

Puzo also wrote the second novel, The Sicilian, which was released in 1984, and was made into a film (with Godfather references removed) in 1987. Mark Winegardner wrote the next two novels, The Godfather Returns and The Godfather's Revenge, released in 2004 and 2006 respectively. Edward Falco wrote the fifth novel, based on a draft script by Mario Puzo, titled The Family Corleone, which also served as a prequel to Puzo's first novel. It was released in 2012.

Random House announced in May 2026 that they had acquired a Godfather novel authorized by the estate of Mario Puzo and written by bestselling author Adriana Trigiani. Connie is scheduled for a fall 2027 release and will center on the Corleone family member played by Talia Shire.

== Novel series ==
Title	Author	ISBN	Date of publication	Summary
The Godfather	Mario Puzo	0-399-10342-2	10 March 1969	The Corleone family fights a mob war with the other four Mafia families in New York in the years after World War II. The war sees the ascent of Don Vito Corleone's youngest son Michael, who previously held his family's crime enterprise in low regard. With Vito retired at the conclusion of the war, Michael orchestrates a plan to relocate the family's power base to Las Vegas while eliminating its remaining rivals in New York.
The Sicilian	Mario Puzo	0-671-43564-7	November 1984	Michael Corleone, about to return from exile in Sicily at the end of the Five Families War, is instructed by his father to help Sicilian bandit Salvatore Giuliano escape to America with him. Giuliano's rise from an ordinary Sicilian peasant to a power in Sicily rivaling even the Mafia is chronicled. However, Giuliano makes enemies in both law enforcement and organized crime circles, and his quest to free Sicily from oppression is ultimately unsuccessful.
The Godfather Returns	Mark Winegardner	1-4000-6101-6	16 November 2004	The story picks up immediately after the end of the first novel. The events of the film The Godfather Part II take place within the time frame of this novel, but are only mentioned in the background. Many of Puzo's characters are expanded upon, especially Fredo Corleone, consigliere Tom Hagen, and Johnny Fontane, and new characters like Nick Geraci, Mickey Shea, Danny Shea, and Francesca Corleone are introduced. The other half of the novel goes deeper into Michael's role as Don and his dream of legitimizing the Corleone family. The novel expands on Michael's service in World War II as well as his brother Fredo's secret life. The novel shows how Sonny, Fredo and Tom Hagen join the family business, as well as the deaths of Peter Clemenza and Salvatore Tessio.
The Godfather's Revenge	Mark Winegardner	0-399-15384-5	7 November 2006	Michael Corleone is coping poorly after ordering the murder of his brother Fredo and giving custody of his children to his former wife Kay Adams. Michael and Tom Hagen try to thwart the revenge plans of the former Corleone family caporegime Nick Geraci. Their plans are thrown into disarray when Hagen is framed for the murder of his mistress. Meanwhile, organized crime fights against increased law enforcement efforts led by Attorney General Danny Shea (historically analogous to Robert F. Kennedy) and his brother, President Jimmy Shea (analogous to John F. Kennedy).
The Family Corleone	Ed Falco	0-446-57462-7	8 May 2012	A prequel set during the Great Depression, near the end of Prohibition, it tells how Vito Corleone consolidated his power to become the most powerful Don in New York City. Also, it tells of Sonny Corleone's inauguration into the family business. The novel also reveals how Luca Brasi became associated with the Corleones, and introduces a number of new characters, including rival crime boss Giuseppe Mariposa.

== Chronology ==
1. The Family Corleone (2012) – set from 1933 to 1934
2. The Godfather (1969) – set from 1945 to 1955
3. The Sicilian (1984) – set in 1950
4. The Godfather Returns (2004) – set from 1955 to 1962
5. The Godfather's Revenge (2006) – set from 1963 to 1964

== Sales ==
The first novel remained on The New York Times Best Seller list for 67 weeks and sold over nine million copies in the two years following its release.

The series has sold 120 million copies.

== Film adaptations ==
=== The Godfather ===
The Godfather trilogy is one of the most acclaimed franchises in film history. The Godfather, released in 1972, is an adaptation of the Puzo novel of the same name. Though The Godfather Part II, released in 1974, mostly chronicles original storylines written for the film, it also adapts elements from the first novel – mostly the early life of Vito Corleone. The story of The Godfather Part III, released in 1990, is not taken from any novel. The Winegardner novels, released after Part III, incorporate and explain elements from Part II and Part III. Falco's novel, The Family Corleone, was based on an unproduced screenplay written by Puzo (intended for a fourth Godfather film, which was abandoned after Puzo's death).

=== The Sicilian ===
The 1987 film The Sicilian, based on Puzo's novel of the same name, stars Christopher Lambert as Salvatore Giuliano. Due to copyright issues, all Godfather references were removed and the characters of Michael Corleone and Peter Clemenza were not included in the film.

== Legal issues ==
Paramount Pictures sued the Puzo estate for the publication of The Godfather's Revenge and also sought to block the publication of The Family Corleone, claiming that it had only authorized publication of one sequel, The Godfather Returns. The lawsuit claimed that the novel tarnished the legacy of the films and misled readers into believing that the novels were authorized by Paramount.

With the release of the fifth novel, The Family Corleone, the estate of Puzo had sought to keep Paramount Pictures from producing a feature film based on the novel. This has been resolved, with Paramount gaining the rights to make more Godfather films (as of early 2025, no plans had been announced).

== See also ==
- Fools Die
- The Last Don
- Omertà (novel)
- The Offer
