= Francis Ford Coppola's unrealized projects =

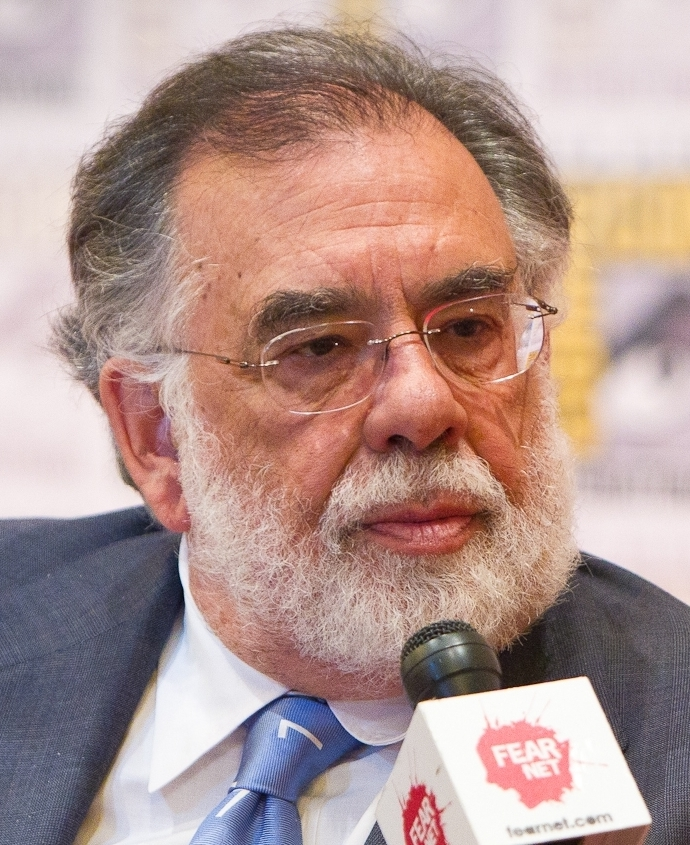
Coppola at the 2011 San Diego Comic-Con

During his long career, American film director Francis Ford Coppola has worked on a number of projects which never progressed beyond the pre-production stage under his direction. Some of these productions fell in development hell or were cancelled.

== 1960s ==
=== Pilma Pilma ===
In 1962, Coppola won first prize in UCLA's eighth annual Samuel Goldwyn Foundation Creative Writing contest for the original screenplay Pilma Pilma. Despite gaining some notoriety in the industry, his screenplay was never produced into a film.

=== The Fifth Coin ===
One of Coppola's early screenplays, titled The Fifth Coin, at one point was to star George Segal and be helmed by British director Ken Annakin in the mid-60s.

=== My Last Duchess ===
According to Scenario magazine, Coppola had written an early script called My Last Duchess, loosely inspired by the Robert Browning poem of the same name.

=== Reflections in a Golden Eye ===
Coppola wrote an early draft of Reflections in a Golden Eye, at that time with Tony Richardson attached to direct, but his revision was ultimately never used after Richardson was replaced.

== 1970s ==
=== Jeremiah Johnson ===
In May 1970, Coppola was set to direct and John Milius was hired to write Jeremiah Johnson for Warner Bros. After Robert Redford became interested in the project, he bought the script and enlisted Sydney Pollack to direct the film.

=== The Disenchanted ===
In the early 1970s, Coppola wrote a screenplay adapting the period novel The Disenchanted, by Budd Schulberg. The novel was based in part on the relationship between Schulberg and F. Scott Fitzgerald, and the ill-fated writing assignment they were tasked with in the 1920s. Several filmmakers had made attempts at adapting the work previously, including John Huston and Julius J. Epstein, "but Coppola's script is the best," claimed Schulberg. In 1990, there was talk of Gene Kirkwood trying to secure financing for Coppola's adaptation. Unlike the novel, which told the story through flashbacks, Coppola's adaptation told the entire story through the use of flashforwards. His screenplay is now believed to be lost.

=== Untitled twin siblings film ===
In 1974, Coppola told The New York Times that he was writing a "small, personal film—about twins, one male and one female."

=== First Contact ===
In April 1975, it was reported that Coppola would co-write, direct and produce the science fiction TV special First Contact for NBC‐TV during the 1976–77 season. Collaborating on the original story with astronomer Carl Sagan, Coppola said it would concern "the earth's response to its first contact with beings from another planet." The television program was never produced, but in 1985, Sagan published their script as the novel Contact, albeit without Coppola's credit or permission, and sold the film rights to Warner Bros. before his death. This led to a lawsuit between him and Warner, with Coppola claiming that it was based on his story, seeking $250,000 in compensatory damages and an injunction against production or distribution of the film.

=== The Brotherhood of the Grape ===
In September 1975, Coppola acquired the screen rights to John Fante's novel The Brotherhood of the Grape. He was reported to direct the film from a screenplay by Robert Towne, but the film was ultimately never made due to Coppola's preoccupation on the lengthy production of Apocalypse Now.

=== Elective Affinities ===
Coppola intended to follow up Apocalypse Now with a multi-part film version of Johann Wolfgang von Goethe's Elective Affinities in 3D, which would combine Eastern and Western influences. Inspired directly by Kabuki theater and how the form abandoned realism for illusion in scenery, story, and actors, Coppola envisioned Elective Affinities taking place over a ten-year period in both Japan and America:

"My idea is to make it a quartet of works in which each part will fit in and qualify the other, each part will present a different season and a different character. Everything will be based on four, and it will have many levels to it. One part will take place in the period when the Americans and the Japanese first met, another in postwar Japan, another during the period of the '60s—the business-Mishima-gay bar scene—and the fourth time period will be the future. This last part will deal with an enormous space telescope the size of the Graf Zeppelin that America and Japan send out into the universe because of its incredible capacity to witness the birth of the universe. And the last ten minutes or so of the movie, at the moment that it gets to that point, will be what it sees. It's a crazy thing, and I run through it for fun in my head."

Coppola first conceived the idea while in Japan after finishing Apocalypse Now:

"As I think back, I realize I had made The Godfather, The Conversation, Godfather Part II, and Apocalypse Now in short order, one after the other. I wanted to do something totally different in style and form, something with songs, like theater. Also, in my so-called mind, with my marriage failing, I imagined it would be part of a great four-part project based on Goethe's Elective Affinities, with its story related to the Man, the Woman, the Other Man, the Other Woman. To this day I am fascinated with form. I know I am filled with emotion; I just need the right envelope to put it in."

Coppola began developing the project, even laying out plans to construct a 2,000-seat theater in the Rocky Mountains for the first showing as a weekend event. A resort hotel would have also been built underneath the theater so that guests could view any part of the film again to rewatch a scene that was missed or wasn't understood. Coppola described this as "a new kind of mental theme park." He ultimately chose to postpone the project until he felt he was ready, believing at the time that it was too big for him, both intellectually and technologically. Plans officially stalled at American Zoetrope in 1982, following the commercial and critical failure of his film One from the Heart.

=== On the Road ===
In September 1978, the screen rights to Jack Kerouac's On the Road were bought by Coppola. Initially interested in directing the film himself, it underwent several different adaptations throughout the 1980s, with Coppola enlisting a new co-writer each time, intent on getting a script that captured the spirit of the source novel. Michael Herr and Barry Gifford both worked on screenplays at separate stages, as well as Coppola's son, Roman. "I tried to write a script, but I never knew how to do it," Coppola said in 2007. "It's hard – it's a period piece. It's very important that it be period. Anything involving period costs a lot of money." At the time, Coppola and Fred Roos wanted to cast Jack Nicholson for a role. Later, in 1995, Coppola toyed with the notion of filming On the Road on black and white 16 mm film, with Ethan Hawke and Brad Pitt playing the two leads. According to John H. Williams, the film's producer at the time, Coppola "got backed up" in his infamous studio lawsuit with Warner Bros. and had to abandon the project. After this version also faltered, Coppola stepped away as director, and in 2001 enlisted novelist Russell Banks to pen a new adaptation for Joel Schumacher to direct. Schumacher wanted Billy Crudup and Colin Farrell, but this too failed. In 2005, it was reported that an adaptation of On the Road would begin shooting the following year in Spring, with Walter Salles instead taking over as director, using a separate adaptation penned by José Rivera. Coppola served as executive producer on this version, which would be delayed for another several years before eventually seeing release in 2012.

=== Serpentine ===
In 1979, The Washington Post reported that author Thomas Thompson had struck a deal with Coppola to direct the adaptation of his novel Serpentine.

== 1980s ==
=== Spring Snow ===
Coppola planned to direct Spring Snow, adapted from the first novel in the tetralogy of novels written by Yukio Mishima. The film was among the projects that were in development at American Zoetrope in 1981.

=== The Murder of Napoleon ===
In May 1982, it was reported that Coppola had lost the bidding war for the film rights to The Murder of Napoleon, the nonfiction book by Ben Weider and David Hapgood about Napoleon Bonaparte. Jack Nicholson instead purchased the rights, and wanted Robert Towne to adapt; with the hope of interesting Stanley Kubrick in the project. In a 1999 interview, John Milius said, "another thing [Coppola and I] were going to do, is I've always felt he really should do something on Napoleon that he's always wanted to do."

=== The Pope of Greenwich Village ===
In fall 1982, Coppola made a deal with Orion Pictures and HBO to direct The Pope of Greenwich Village, then under the title The Village, with Mickey Rourke and Al Pacino signed to play the leads. However, after the film moved back to United Artists, Coppola dropped out. For the final film, Rourke remained in the cast, but Pacino was replaced by Eric Roberts.

=== Unforgiven ===
According to David Webb Peoples, Coppola optioned an early draft of his script in 1984 when it had been developed under the titles The Cut-Whore Killings and The William Munny Killings. Despite his interest, Coppola failed to the raise the money to develop the project any further, and the film was later made by Clint Eastwood as Unforgiven, in 1992. Coppola wanted John Malkovich as Munny and actually met with him to discuss the part.

=== Legs ===
After having previously partnered with author William Kennedy on the screenplay for The Cotton Club, Coppola developed an adaptation of his novel Legs in 1984 that was to star Mickey Rourke in the role of Jack "Legs" Diamond. After Coppola, the project briefly had Michael Cimino attached to helm, for Dino De Laurentiis. Neither version was made.

=== Agnes of God ===
In August 1984, Coppola approached Columbia with interest in directing the Agnes of God adaptation. The following month, Jane Fonda was cast to star and Norman Jewison was decided to direct.

=== Evita ===
In the mid-1980s, Madonna interested Coppola in directing her in the film version of Evita. After several meetings, Coppola pulled out of the project as well, and the film was eventually directed by Alan Parker.

=== LaBrava ===
In 1986, Coppola was one of several directors approached by Walter Mirisch and Elmore Leonard to direct the adaptation of Leonard's novel LaBrava for Cannon Films. Dustin Hoffman was attached to star, and Coppola wanted to do it, but only after he finished Peggy Sue Got Married and the then-in-the-works Legs. However, this postponement would have taken past the mandated start date for shooting, so Cannon and Coppola parted ways.

=== The Adventures of Pinocchio ===
As early as the late 1980s, Coppola had begun considering concepts for a live-action film based upon the 19th century novel, The Adventures of Pinocchio. In 1991, Coppola made a contingent deal with Warner Bros. to produce and direct The Adventures of Pinocchio, as well as two others involving the life of J. Edgar Hoover and the children's novel The Secret Garden. Jim Henson Productions, Inc. had entered the project as co-producer and Frank Galati and Mauro Borrelli were contacted for screenwriting and artistic services, respectively. In May 1992, Coppola wrote a treatment for the film, which was registered with the Writers Guild. The following year, Galati submitted his first draft screenplay for Pinocchio, which was deemed "unacceptable" by Warner Bros., who decided not to move forward on the basis of his screenplay. At this time, approximately $350,000 had been spent on the project. Despite this, Coppola continued to develop the film and, in mid-1993, collaborated with Mauro Borrelli on yet another draft which differed significantly from the Galati screenplay. He also wrote 12 original songs for potential use, and had apparently considered casting Michael Jackson for the lead role. In June 1994, Coppola tried to set up his Pinocchio project at Columbia Pictures (with an estimated $50 million budget), who said his hoped-for January 1995 production start was unlikely and that the earliest filming could commence was spring. Coppola told Daily Variety in 1994 that the film would not be a remake of the 1940 animated film; "I'd only attempt it because the Disney movie is different from the original story." For the design of the Pinocchio puppet, Coppola brought aboard Dean Tavoularis, Don Was, Karl Lagerfeld, Jim Dine and Brian Henson, claiming that it would be the product of "a whole range of the latest [filming] technology from puppet to live action to the computer technology started with Jurassic Park." Coppola later mentioned that he intended for sections of the film to be shot in 3D. Warner Bros., however, refused to relinquish the rights to the property to Columbia (despite the story being in the public domain), claiming they owned any and all of Coppola's work on any type or nature of Pinocchio film in perpetuity. In 1995, Coppola sued Warner Bros. for "tortious interference", which began a long legal battle. In 1998, a jury awarded Coppola $80 million against Warner Bros; $60 million in punitive damages and $20 million in compensation, though these payments were later revoked by the appeals court in 2001 when he lost the suit. It was concluded that Warner Bros. had falsely claimed to have a deal, thus depriving Coppola of his chance to make the film with Columbia.

== 1990s ==
=== The Godfather Part IV ===
While preparing the script for The Godfather Part III, Coppola and Mario Puzo briefly flirted with the idea of a potential fourth film in the series. The project was delayed several times, due to Coppola's prolonged series of lawsuits. Puzo had reportedly written a treatment for Part IV, intending it to be both a sequel and prequel told in a similar narrative to The Godfather Part II, that would have focused on Vincent Corleone's reign as new head of the crime family as well as young Sonny Corleone's rise to power in the 1930s. Leonardo DiCaprio was even cast to star as a young Sonny, but plans were officially scrapped following Puzo's death in 1999. Elements of his story formed the basis of Edward Falco's 2012 novel The Family Corleone.

=== Playhouse '90s ===
In July 1991, The New York Times reported that Coppola was planning a revival of live televised dramas with Playhouse '90s, an homage to the CBS series of the 1950s. Coppola indicated at the time that he would produce the dramas through American Zoetrope and that they were not envisioned as a series but rather as major programs that would appear on CBS in prime time perhaps twice a year. Later that month, further details emerged that Playhouse '90s would consist of "live, one-hour dramatic plays" featuring mostly non-television actors, writers and directors, airing on CBS in spring 1992 with Coppola directing the first telecast. In 1992, Variety revealed that Spike Lee had written one to direct, and that Jules Pfeiffer was also writing one, with Coppola assuring that with the project, "the writer will have all the controls in this TV series as dramatists do." By July 1993, it had yet to materialize. That September, Variety reported that Coppola was preparing to direct the first telecast, "Top of the Ninth", centering on baseball and planned to be shot at a real stadium by the end of that year. In 1994, it was reported that after years of development limbo, CBS would air "Top of the Ninth" on a Sunday in April, though this never occurred and no updates followed since.

=== The Secret Garden ===
Coppola initially considered making The Secret Garden as a directing/producing vehicle for Warner Bros. in 1991, though he would later relinquish his role and instead serve as executive producer on the film.

=== Hoover ===
In October 1991, it was reported that Coppola would direct Hoover, a biopic adapted from the non-fiction book J. Edgar Hoover: The Man and the Secrets for Quincy Jones Entertainment. The script was written by Larry and Paul Barber. He had first intended to direct and produce the film for Warner Bros., in addition to his Pinocchio project, though this deal was never finalized.

=== Harlot's Ghost ===
In December 1991, it was reported that Coppola had purchased the screen rights to Norman Mailer's spy thriller novel Harlot's Ghost, and had tapped John Milius to pen the adaptation. "It's a perfect film for Francis," said Milius. "It deals with things he already knows–gangsters and war. It's like a cross between The Godfather and Apocalypse Now. It's about families and duplicity and danger, but this time provoked by the government." According to Zoetrope president Fred Fuchs, the company hoped to have a completed draft of the script by fall of 1992 for production to be able to begin in 1993.

=== David Lean's Nostromo ===
In early 1992, reports emerged that Coppola or Martin Scorsese would take over for David Lean on his epic $43 million adaptation of Nostromo by Joseph Conrad, which was put on hold after the director's passing the previous year. According to Lean biographer Stephen M. Silverman, the cast included Dennis Quaid, Julian Sands, Isabella Rossellini, Irene Papas, Paul Scofield and Anthony Quinn. It was not indicated if they would still be involved in the revived production. The film was never posthumously produced due to Coppola and Scorsese's noncommittal to stepping in as backup director.

=== Cure ===
In May 1992, Coppola was to direct a film about the AIDS epidemic, penned by Diane Johnson, for Columbia Pictures. The film's production was to coincide with research for an actual cure. Johnson worked with filmmaker Jessica Abbe to interview leading scientists, including Anthony Fauci, Robert Gallo, Jerome Groopman, Luc Montagnier, Françoise Barré-Sinoussi, Jacques Leibowitch, Daniel Zagury, and Jonas Salk.

=== Mary Shelley's Frankenstein ===
Following the success Coppola had with Bram Stoker's Dracula, he had also intended on serving as director on a heavily book-accurate version of Frankenstein as well. However, at a certain point during pre-production, he decided to step back and merely stay on as executive producer, with Kenneth Branagh chosen to take on directorial duties. The two infamously clashed during production. Coppola thought more in cinematic and audience-pleasing terms—accordingly, he cast Robert De Niro for the role of the monster and wanted to cut the entire first half hour for being too slow—while Branagh had sought to be more faithful to the original work and hired Frank Darabont to accommodate this direction. When released, Mary Shelley's Frankenstein represented a compromise of both of their visions.

=== Maggie ===
As reported by Variety in February 1993, Coppola had a film called Maggie set up at MGM, but was postponing it and other projects to take a brief sabbatical from directing.

=== The Good Shepherd ===
In 1994, Eric Roth wrote the original screenplay The Good Shepherd for Coppola to direct for Columbia Pictures. Coppola stepped down from the project, citing an inability to relate to the main characters due to their "lack of emotion", but remained on as an executive producer. The film languished in development hell for years, eventually being made over a decade later, in 2006.

=== Weird Tales ===
In 1995, Coppola was reportedly set to collaborate with fellow directors Oliver Stone and Tim Burton on an anthology series for HBO based on Weird Tales, a collection of horror short stories written by the likes of H. P. Lovecraft, Ray Bradbury and Robert Bloch. Coppola was to executive produce and direct one of three episodes in a 90-minute pilot.

=== Mai, the Psychic Girl ===
For a time in the mid-to-late 1990s, Coppola was attached to direct a feature adaptation of the Japanese manga series, Mai, the Psychic Girl.

=== Untitled musical film ===
In 1998, following The Rainmaker, Coppola announced in Variety that he no longer wanted to work as a director-for-hire and that he had a pre-existing commitment to direct a musical film, in addition to an original screenplay "on the scale of Apocalypse Now but with the tone of The Conversation." No further details were provided.

=== Thirteen Days ===
In 1999,

== 2000s ==
=== The General in His Labyrinth ===
In 2008, Coppola sought to turn Gabriel García Márquez's The General in His Labyrinth into an epic film depicting a portrait of Simón Bolívar at the end of his life. Coppola met with longtime collaborator John Milius about co-adapting the novel to screenplay, but this never materialized.

== 2010s ==
=== Distant Vision ===
In 2012, in an interview conducted for Entertainment Weekly, Coppola stated that he had a secret investor who would help him to finance a "bigger" film he was in the process of writing which he noted would utilize what was learned from making three smaller-scaled films prior; Youth Without Youth, Tetro and Twixt, all of which had been produced independently. He added that this next project was so ambitious that he decided to produce it out of a studio in L.A., where he would have easier access to costume rentals and the actors of his choice. "My story is set in New York. I have a first draft. I'm really ready for a casting phase," Coppola told EW. "Movies are big in proportion to the period. It starts in the middle of the '20s, and there are sections in the '30s and the late '40s, and it goes until the late '60s." The following year, The Hollywood Reporter officially announced that Coppola was preparing the project, a coming-of-age saga chronicling an Italian-American family throughout four decades, specifically focusing on a boy and girl in their late teens. At this stage, casting directors Courtney Bright and Nicole Daniels, and frequent Coppola producer Fred Roos were hired. In conceiving the overall story loosely based on his own youth, Coppola pondered, "'What is the thing that really nails the period that I grew up in?' I thought, well, we had civil rights and a lot of movements after years of being oppressive, we had the Vietnamese War, we had the death of a president, and I realized all these things came to me through television." As a result, the final script spans three generations of a family whose history coincides with the development of television, (which Coppola considered the most important innovation of his lifetime). The project was decidedly titled Distant Vision, named after an early-day moniker for TV. Much of the story parallels that of Coppola's childhood, namely a scene in which the main character Tony plays with puppets while isolated with polio. By 2014, with the advent of film-based technology which had rapidly advanced due to live sports games, Coppola decided that due to its subject matter, the film should be realized as a live venture, envisioning a form which "can be composed and interpreted for different audiences that come to see it." This concept of "live cinema" would be based on using feeds from a multitude of cameras, instant replay servers, and other sources that the director would be able to switch live so that the performances are acted live and viewed by an audience in real time:

"The technology that's been invented for sports and is only used for sports — football games, soccer games — you could use that for storytelling, and it does some very magical things. You gain a lot from control and being able to edit, but there's also something to say for live performance. When they did those operas in the 18th century, they were huge productions, but they did it live. And there was the thrill of, 'I saw Aida the first night.' And you could have that in film, too."

In 2015, Coppola workshopped Distant Vision as an experimental film with students at the Oklahoma City Community College, described as a live cinema performance piece "created in real time." It was produced on a series of sets constructed on a 6,000-square-foot soundstage at the OCCC campus over the course of three weeks. A short 52-minute version of the script successfully screened live at theaters in Paris, New York City, Los Angeles and Napa, California on June 5, 2015. In 2016, the script for Distant Vision was described as "a 500-page cycle of plays", with Coppola drawing comparisons to the stories by Eugene O'Neill and Buddenbrooks by Thomas Mann. He stated that the project would be distributed and split up into several chapters, "People will come to a theater like this one to watch us put on the show and then months later they can come back for the next chapter." Later that year, another production of Coppola's Distant Vision was staged with the help of UCLA film students and faculty at the Freud Playhouse. On July 22, 2016, a 27-minute live broadcast of Distant Vision was presented to a limited audience. Subsequently, Coppola published a book, Live Cinema and Its Techniques, which detailed both experiences. He had always intended upon producing a long, complete version of the project, "[written] in a different way" and done as "a sprawling multi-year project." In August 2024, while promoting his self-funded film Megalopolis, Coppola announced that one of two potential future projects would be to finally complete Distant Vision, which he optimistically said he would finance with the box office returns of Megalopolis. "I'll want to do another roll of the dice with that one," he added. In France the following month, Coppola noted that his plans remained to shoot the feature entirely live and that it would be "much harder" to make than Megalopolis.

== 2020s ==
=== Glimpses of the Moon ===
In early 2024, it was confirmed by Coppola that Megalopolis was not intended to be his final film, as he was already in the process of working on a new project. While it "won't be cheap by any means," he emphasized that, unlike Megalopolis, it would not be an "epic". At a screening of The Cotton Club at Atlanta's Plaza Theatre, he revealed it to be a loose adaptation of Edith Wharton's The Glimpses of the Moon which would in turn be "inspired" by Leo McCarey's The Awful Truth. In August that year, Coppola announced his intentions to shoot the film in England. He then told The Daily Telegraph that his version of Glimpses of the Moon would have "strong dance and musical elements," adding that he "turned [the novel] into a very odd confection." He also noted that it would be "funded the conventional way, with the help of national subsidies, because I'm all borrowed out." In November, actress and singer Cher mentioned while promoting Part One of Cher: The Memoir that Coppola recently reached out to her, via email, about potentially starring in a film project they first had discussed twenty years ago. Principal photography on Glimpses of the Moon was initially expected to commence sometime in early 2025. In March, Coppola had firmly relocated to the UK where he was said to be in prep mode on the film. On a Tetragrammaton podcast appearance, he claimed to have already briefly shot some scenes despite having little money to do so. He also added that his script is "filled with Noël Coward songs" and features a new ending that replaces the original's "weak" one. When discussing the financial strain of Megalopolis, Coppola told Deadline, "I used up my last hundred million dollars" and thus would not be able to self-fund the next venture. According to Megadoc director Mike Figgis—who advised Coppola to make his next film on a "tiny budget"—the budget of Glimpses of the Moon would be no more than $20 million. By July, the film's setting had been shifted to Italy. That month, Coppola indicating during an interview with TGR Calabria that he was location scouting for "a new film that will focus on the beautiful things of Calabria." Production plans were likely delayed due to an injury Coppola sustained in August. Despite this, the following month, Coppola began holding casting calls open to men and women between the ages of 18–72 and minors between 6–17, with a 30-day production eyed for November/December in the areas of Calabria and Basilicata. Olivia Musini and Maximilian Navarra were listed as producers. Coppola's frequent cinematographer Vittorio Storaro was attached as the film's director of photography. On Coppola's 87th birthday, President of the Basilicata region, Vito Bardi, officially unveiled Glimpses of the Moon, saying it would be shot variously throughout southern Italy, with regions like Basilicata and Calabria serving as an international-scale set, helping recreate "European atmospheres" for the story; though he did not mention an exact start date. Italian outlet Corriere della Sera reported that Coppola was expected to arrive in Basilicata at the end of August 2026 and film in specific locations in Matera, Bernalda, and Montescaglioso before the production finally moved into Calabria. The locations mentioned were Palazzo Malvinni Malvezzi, Matera Cathedral, and the Abbey of San Michele Arcangelo.

== Offers ==
=== Midnight Cowboy ===
Coppola claimed to have been offered the position to write Midnight Cowboy before director John Schlesinger was officially attached, but he turned it down because he did not understand the material. Waldo Salt instead adapted the novel, with Coppola later going on to cite the resulting film as one of his personal favorites.

=== Modigliani ===
In late 1970s, Al Pacino sought to star in a biopic about the painter Amedeo Modigliani, based on a play by Dennis McIntyre, and had wanted Coppola to direct. After reading Richard Price's screenplay draft in 1979, he turned down Pacino's proposition and would instead move on to other projects.

=== The Sicilian ===
Coppola was one of three directors, including Martin Scorsese and Brian De Palma, who turned down the offer to direct Steve Shagan's adaptation of The Sicilian. The film would eventually be rewritten and directed by Michael Cimino.

=== A Day with Wilbur Robinson ===
In the early 1990s, Coppola was offered by author William Joyce to direct an adaptation of his book A Day with Wilbur Robinson, He turned it down, and the film became Meet The Robinsons.

=== Connie ===
In 2026, when the film rights to Connie, a new Godfather installment authorized by the Mario Puzo estate, was acquired by Paramount, The Hollywood Reporter asked Coppola's team to comment on his willingness to direct another film in the saga. A rep for the filmmaker said that he was "unlikely" to do so.

== Producer only ==
=== The Naked Gypsies ===
Following the completion and success of The Rain People, Coppola and his newly-founded Zoetrope Studios struck a seven-picture deal with Warner Bros. in 1969. The only of these that were ultimately produced was THX 1138, The Conversation and Apocalypse Now—the latter two albeit several years later. "He sold seven because that was his lucky number," George Lucas later said. "But he didn't actually have seven scripts." Among the films on the slate was The Naked Gypsies, a comedy written by Willard Huyck. The project was ultimately shelved upon the executives' dissatisfaction with THX 1138.

=== Have We Seen the Elephant? ===
This film was another of the proposed projects under Zoetrope's original seven-picture agreement with Warner Bros. Conceived as a historical drama by filmmaker John Korty, the story centered around the lingering effects of the California Gold Rush on contemporary America. As initially described in promotional materials, Have We Seen the Elephant? was planned as "a Korty Films Inc. Production" with a screenplay then in progress. After the collapse of the deal in the wake of THX 1138's poor reception, Korty attempted to keep the project alive independently. In October 1971, The New York Times reported that Have We Seen the Elephant? was still in development as Korty's next intended feature film. Korty explained that the narrative would shift back and forth in time, contrasting a present-day San Francisco garbage collector obsessed with Gold Rush history and events of the 1849 era itself. He hoped to begin production in spring 1972 on location at historic sites including Angels Camp, Sutters Creek, and Grass Valley, but this never occurred.

=== Vesuvia ===
Vesuvia was one of the early conceptual projects planned under Coppola's seven-film development slate with Warner Bros., to be directed by Carroll Ballard. The story follows a young man who, upon returning home from an unspecified foreign war, begins a "regression into a fantasy and madness." The film was slated to shoot throughout the United States during the summer of 1970, with the screenplay reportedly in development at the time the project was announced. Despite early momentum, Vesuvia too was eventually scrapped after Warner Bros. withdrew support from Zoetrope.

=== Santa Rita ===
Also part of the abandoned slate under the 1970 Warner Bros.–Zoetrope agreement was Santa Rita, a politically charged drama directed by Steve Wax and based on the essay "Santa Rita, Patroness of the Wreckage Generation" by Jesse Ritter. The film aimed to chronicle the 1969 People's Park protest in Berkeley, California, including the violent police crackdown and subsequent mass arrests that culminated in the imprisonment of protesters at Santa Rita Jail. Promotional material at the time indicated: "The terror of a concentration camp in Northern California, 1969," with the screenplay then in progress. According to Stan Adler, who was involved in the film's research and early writing process, the project stalled amid script delays and growing controversy, and was ultimately cancelled after Warner Bros. ended its support.

=== One Hundred Years of Solitude ===
According to John Milius, when Coppola had first launched Zoetrope Studios, he had "grand ideas" for the company which included mounting a production of One Hundred Years of Solitude among other projects.

=== The Killer Angels ===
In addition to One Hundred Years of Solitude, Coppola had also had the ambition to produce The Killer Angels for Zoetrope Studios.

=== Photoplay ===
In 1978, filmmaker Martha Coolidge was hired to work on the rock and roll love story Photoplay for Coppola's Zoetrope Studios. The project was eventually abandoned when studio began its collapse in 1980.

=== The Story ===
In September 1980,

=== The Pirates of Penzance ===
In December 1980, Coppola and producer Joseph Papp planned to collaborate on a film adaptation of the Gilbert and Sullivan musical The Pirates of Penzance, produced under American Zoetrope. Although the Coppola/Papp version did not proceed, Universal Pictures released a film of Papp's production in 1983, with its stage director Wilford Leach also directing the film.

=== The Conquest of Mexico ===
Coppola also planned to raise financing for Werner Herzog's $20 million dollar project The Conquest of Mexico, to be produced under his Zoetrope Studios.

=== The Van Helsing Chronicles ===
After the success of Bram Stoker's Dracula, Coppola and James V. Hart developed a follow-up to that film, tentatively titled The Van Helsing Chronicles, centering on Anthony Hopkins' Helsing as he fends off new supernatural threats. Though the project didn't ultimately happen, a Van Helsing movie later arrived in the form of a 2004 blockbuster with Hugh Jackman in the role.

=== The Mummy ===
In 1996, a film adaptation of The Mummy was said to be in the works produced by Coppola and James V. Hart, after previously having teamed for Bram Stoker's Dracula and Mary Shelley's Frankenstein. This version was to have been based on the original novel, which was set in Ireland.

=== Mirror ===
"A sci-fi adventure set 100 years in the future, written by Mark Jacobs. Pic is set up at Disney, with Coppola and Fuchs producing."

=== Fidel ===
"TV-movie about the Cuban leader, directed by Leon Ichaso, for Showtime. Jimmy Smits is attached to star."

=== Madame Bovary ===
"TV-movie based on the classic Flaubert novel, also for Showtime, with Brian Gilbert (“Wilde”) directing."

=== Hollywood ===
"Dramatic miniseries about a Jewish family in the early days of Hollywood for ABC."

=== Untitled Carroll Ballard historical series ===
In June 2017, fellow colleague and The Black Stallion director Carroll Ballard was working on a long-form television series that would see him reteaming with Coppola. Speaking about the project during an interview, Ballard described it as a historical drama leading up to "how the [United States of America] came together". Specifically, it would cover events from the late 16th century such as the second Bayano War and the Lost Colony; with the main narrative alternating between America and England. As with Black Stallion, he was to presumably direct through Coppola with the support of his company American Zoetrope. According to Ballard, at the time, they were just preparing to begin shopping the project around. Despite this, no official announcement followed, and no subsequent updates emerged from either party.

== See also ==
- Francis Ford Coppola filmography
