= Grotta Bianca =

Cave in Italy

Coordinates: 40°33′9.41″N 14°15′36.88″E

The Grotta Bianca ("white cave") is a sea cave located on the island of Capri, Italy. It derives its name from white incrustations of calcareous matter upon its sides, and from clusters of white stalactites which hang from the roof and fringe the entrance. The cave faces east and is situated near the Punta della Chiavica. The entry, about 70–80 feet (21–24 m) high, leads into upper and lower caves, of which the former is not easily accessible. The lower cave can be entered by boat for a short distance. Unlike most other caves at the water-level, it is much broader at approximately 6 feet (1.8 m) above the water than actually at the surface. The total height is no more than 24 feet (7.3 m). The upper erosion line is clearly marked near the cave and within it. The upper cave seems to belong to an earlier period.

According to the book The Sicilian by Mario Puzo, the Grotta Bianca is where Salvatore Giuliano, the famous Sicilian bandit, stayed during his first nights as an outlaw after shooting dead an armed national policeman. Although the book is dramatized, many believe some information in it is true, with regard to Giuliano.
