= Tom Hagen =

Fictional character from The Godfather series

- The Godfather character
- Robert Duvall portraying Tom Hagen
- First appearance: The Godfather
- Last appearance: The Godfather's Revenge
- Created by: Mario Puzo
- Portrayed by: Robert Duvall

In-universe information
- Gender: Male
- Occupation: Lawyer/Consigliere
- Family: Corleone family
- Spouse: Theresa Hagen
- Children: Frank Hagen; Andrew Hagen; Christina Hagen; Gianna Hagen
- Relatives: Martin/Henry Hagen (father); Bridget Hagen (mother); Unnamed sister Vito Corleone (adopted father); Carmela Corleone (adopted mother); Sonny Corleone (adopted brother); Fredo Corleone (adopted brother); Michael Corleone (adopted brother); Connie Corleone (adopted sister)

Thomas Hagen is a fictional character in Mario Puzo's 1969 novel The Godfather and Francis Ford Coppola's films The Godfather (1972) and The Godfather Part II (1974). He is portrayed by Robert Duvall in the films. He also appears in the Mark Winegardner sequel novels The Godfather Returns and The Godfather's Revenge, as well as Ed Falco's novel The Family Corleone. Duvall was nominated for an Academy Award and a BAFTA Award for Best Supporting Actor for his performance in the first film.

He operates as the consigliere and as a lawyer for the Corleone family, and is an informally adopted member of the family.

== Character overview ==
Hagen is the informally adopted son of the mafia boss Don Vito Corleone. He is a lawyer and the consigliere to the Corleone American mafia family. Logical and gentle, he serves as the voice of reason within the family. The novel and first film establish that he is of German-Irish ancestry.

Vito's eldest son Santino (James Caan) befriends 11-year-old Tom, who was living on the street after running away from an orphanage. Sonny brings Tom home and insists he be taken in; the Corleones welcome him as a family member. Hagen considers Vito his true father, although Vito never formally adopts him, believing it would be disrespectful to Hagen's deceased parents.

After law school, Hagen goes to work in the Corleone family business. His non-Italian ancestry precludes his formal membership in the mafia family, but when the consigliere Genco Abbandando dies, Hagen is given his position. Consequently, the other New York families deride the Corleones as "The Irish Gang".

Hagen immerses himself in the Sicilian-American culture and speaks fluent Sicilian. His Northern European appearance, though distracting to the Five Families, is an advantage to his job. He is able to travel and conduct family business in non-Italian circles without potential witnesses noticing him.

While Hagen loves all the Corleones, he is closest to Sonny, and blames himself for Sonny's murder. When Vito semi-retires and his youngest son Michael (Al Pacino) succeeds him as the head of the family, Michael removes Hagen as consigliere, preferring his father informally assume the role; Michael claims Hagen is "not a wartime consigliere". Hagen is hurt, but respects their decision, and begins managing the family's legitimate businesses.

The novel and first film, set in 1945–1955, portray Hagen aiding Vito and Michael in warring against the other ruling New York Mafia families. In The Godfather Part II, set in 1958–1959, Hagen serves as Michael's right-hand man during his power struggle with Hyman Roth (Lee Strasberg). In The Godfather Part III, set in 1979–1980, he is said to have died some years before in an unspecified manner. His role in the story between the second and third films, including his death, is described in Mark Winegardner's sequel novels, The Godfather Returns and The Godfather's Revenge.

== Appearances ==
=== The Godfather (novel and film) ===
In both the novel and film, Hagen is introduced as an important member of the Corleone family. As a child he grew up in a broken family, the son of an abusive alcoholic. Sonny Corleone finds the orphaned Hagen living on the street and suffering from an eye infection, takes him home, and asks his parents to take him in. Sonny's father Vito becomes a surrogate father to Hagen, but never officially adopts him out of respect for the boy's biological parents.

In the novel, Hagen asks to work for Vito after graduating from law school, knowing full well that his adoptive father is the most powerful Mafia boss in the nation. Vito is happy to employ Hagen within his empire, having often said that lawyers can steal more than a phalanx of gangsters. Hagen marries an Italian woman, Theresa, an art specialist with a university degree, a rarity at the time. With Theresa he has two sons, Frank and Andrew, and a daughter, Gianna.

After Vito's longtime consigliere Genco Abbandando is diagnosed with cancer, Hagen becomes acting consigliere and succeeds to the post formally after Abbandando's death. Vito is initially reluctant to give Hagen the post full-time, since Hagen is not a Sicilian.

When singer Johnny Fontane (Al Martino) seeks his godfather Vito's help in securing a movie role that could revitalize his fading career, Vito sends Hagen, accompanied by some of his caporegimes, to Hollywood to persuade Jack Woltz (John Marley), a powerful movie producer, to cast Fontane in his new war film. Hagen offers his benefactor's help with Woltz's union problems and also informs him that one of his actors has been using marijuana and heroin; a deleted scene in the movie shows that this information would be used to damage Woltz's studio. Woltz rebuffs Hagen but becomes more polite after learning he works for the Corleones. Woltz still refuses to cast Fontane, who slept with one of Woltz's protégées, but offers to do any other favor for Vito, expressing his intent to run Fontane out of the entertainment industry as retaliation for his affair. Woltz insults Hagen, referring to him as an Italian-American. Hagen declines, explaining that he's German-Irish. The next morning, Woltz awakens in bed with his prized racing stallion's severed head planted under the satin covers, scaring him into casting Fontane in the film.

Hagen arranges a meeting between Vito and drug kingpin Virgil Sollozzo (Al Lettieri), who wants Vito to help finance his narcotics business and provide legal protection and political influence. Vito ultimately rejects the deal, however, on the grounds that it would cost him his influence over the judges and police if they knew he was in the drug trade.

Offended at the rejection of his deal, Sollozzo has Vito's personal assassin Luca Brasi (Lenny Montana) murdered, Vito himself shot, and Hagen kidnapped off the street. Sollozzo tells Hagen that Vito is dead, and tasks him with persuading Sonny to make peace and accept his narcotics deal. After the meeting, Sollozzo receives word that Vito has survived the shooting, ruining Sollozzo's original plan. Hagen tricks Sollozzo into believing that he will broker the narcotics deal with the Corleones, and Sollozzo releases him, unharmed.

Hagen meets with Sonny, Michael, and Corleone caporegimes Peter Clemenza (Richard S. Castellano) and Salvatore Tessio (Abe Vigoda), and advises them that if Vito dies, Sonny should agree to Sollozzo's deal, since the other Mafia families would most likely support Sollozzo to avoid a war.

After Michael thwarts a second assassination attempt on Vito by Sollozzo, he calls the Corleone compound to warn Sonny. Hagen goes to the hospital with private detectives who are licensed to carry firearms to protect Vito and stops Captain Mark McCluskey (Sterling Hayden), a corrupt NYPD officer on Sollozzo's payroll, from taking Michael into police custody. After Michael kills Sollozzo and McCluskey and flees to Sicily, Hagen informs Vito that the police have cracked down on all Mafia operations. As the hotheaded Sonny takes command of the Corleone family while his father recovers, Hagen tries to talk him out of declaring war against the other families. Sonny lashes out and belittles Hagen's abilities as a "wartime consigliere", but immediately apologizes.

Hagen again acts as an intermediary when Michael's girlfriend Kay Adams (Diane Keaton) arrives at the Corleone compound wanting to contact Michael. He denies knowledge of Michael's whereabouts and refuses to send along her letter, reasoning that any communication between them could tip off the police. Hagen advises she be patient and that Michael will eventually contact her.

When Sonny is murdered by men working for Vito's chief rival Emilio Barzini (Richard Conte), Hagen tearfully informs Vito of his son's death. He accompanies Vito to the funeral home of Corleone family friend Amerigo Bonasera (Salvatore Corsitto), where Vito has Bonasera repair Sonny's body for his funeral. Vito orders no retaliation for Sonny's murder and has Hagen organize a meeting with the other Mafia bosses to end the war. After the meeting, Vito tells Hagen that Barzini was behind Sonny's murder.

After Michael returns to the U.S., Vito semi-retires in 1954 and Michael becomes operating head of the family. Michael removes Hagen as consigliere in favor of having Vito fill the position, restricting Hagen to handling the family's legal business in Nevada, Chicago, and Los Angeles. Michael and Vito explain that the Corleones risk inciting a fight with the planned move to Nevada, and they need a "wartime consigliere". Hagen is hurt, but accepts the decision and remains loyal. In truth, Michael and Vito have been secretly planning to wipe out the other New York Dons and establish the Corleone family as the most powerful crime family in the country. In the novel (and in a deleted scene from the film), Hagen notices that bodyguard Rocco Lampone has been secretly promoted to caporegime and hitman Al Neri reports directly to Michael, rather than through Clemenza and Tessio.

After Vito's death, Hagen accompanies Michael to the funeral, where Michael deduces that Tessio has betrayed the family to Barzini. Hagen is present when Tessio is taken away to be executed, and is also present when Carlo Rizzi (Gianni Russo), the abusive husband of Vito's daughter Connie (Talia Shire), is garroted and murdered by Clemenza for his complicity in Sonny's murder.

In the novel, Kay learns that Michael ordered Rizzi's death, and flees to her parents' home in New Hampshire. Michael sends Hagen there to persuade Kay to return. Hagen ultimately risks his own life by "hypothetically" revealing some family secrets to Kay so she can understand Michael's motives.

=== Sequel films ===
==== The Godfather Part II ====
In The Godfather Part II, Hagen remains Michael's lawyer after their move to Nevada, but his role in the family has been reduced. For instance, he is excluded from the negotiations with Hyman Roth (Lee Strasberg) to legitimize the Corleone family by going into business with Cuban dictator Fulgencio Batista. After an attempt is made on Michael's life, Michael realizes he cannot trust anyone in his inner circle. Assuring their fraternal bond and explaining that he withholds information from him out of admiration, Michael proclaims Hagen acting Don while he leaves and attempts to find out who betrayed him.

Hagen later goes to see Senator Pat Geary (G.D. Spradlin), who had earlier tried to extort Michael, in a brothel owned by Michael's brother Fredo (John Cazale). Geary has woken up next to a dead prostitute, implied to have been murdered by Neri, and is led to believe that he killed her; Hagen reassures Geary that he will clean up the mess and keep him out of trouble in return for the Senator's subservience.

The fall of Batista's regime in Cuba forces Michael to temporarily abandon his plans to become a legitimate businessman, and he resumes his role as the Don of the Corleone family. During the Senate hearings on the Mafia, Hagen is instrumental as the defense when Michael is interrogated. Near the end of the film, Hagen is unable to disguise his displeasure over Michael's increasing ruthlessness and paranoia, questioning the need to kill an already dying Roth. In response, Michael confronts Hagen about his competing job offers, and obliquely threatens to inform Hagen's wife about his mistress. Challenged point blank to confirm his loyalty to the Corleone family, Hagen responds to Michael (in Italian) that he remains loyal. He dutifully fulfills his role as legal adviser, and also in the consigliere's traditional role as dispassionate family envoy. He gives Frank Pentangeli (Michael V. Gazzo), who had betrayed Michael, the "idea" of committing suicide so that Pentangeli's family will be taken care of, while agreeing with Pentangeli that at one point the Corleone family "was like the Roman Empire".

In a deleted subplot, Sonny's widow Sandra becomes Hagen's mistress, a fact that Michael uses to blackmail him into remaining loyal despite Sandra urging Hagen to abandon the Corleone family.

==== The Godfather Part III ====
According to The Godfather Part III, Hagen has already died before the time frame of the film, which is 1979–1980. There is no specific indication in the film as to when or how he died, except that it was prior to his son, Andrew (John Savage), being ordained a Roman Catholic priest. The role of Corleone family lawyer and advisor is instead held by a new character, B. J. Harrison (George Hamilton), as well as Genco's grandson Dominic Abbandando (Don Novello).

Hagen was originally intended to have featured in The Godfather Part III, but was written out due to a salary dispute between Duvall and the film's producers. Coppola stated in the film's commentary that Duvall demanded the same salary as Al Pacino (who portrayed Michael Corleone). However, Duvall said in an interview that he was happy for Pacino to earn twice his salary, but not triple or quadruple it for the same film. Coppola has stated that Part III was to feature a split between Michael and Hagen as its central plot, as seeds of dissension were planted in the first two films.

=== Sequel novels ===
==== The Godfather Returns ====
The Godfather Returns, Mark Winegardner's 2004 sequel to Puzo's original novel, portrays Hagen's role as consigliere in the first few years after Michael ascends to the head of the family. The novel, which covers the period from 1955 to 1962, portrays Hagen once again acting as Michael's right-hand adviser and taking an important role in the Corleones' dealings with a powerful political family, the Sheas (analogous to the Kennedys). Hagen makes a deal with patriarch Mickey Shea that the Corleone family would help get his son, James, elected president on condition that his youngest son, Danny, the new Attorney General, would take a soft stance on organized crime. Meanwhile, Hagen has sights on a political career, running for a Congressional seat in Nevada (which Hagen was initially appointed to) with the ultimate goal of becoming the state's governor; he is badly defeated, however, and abandons any hopes of holding public office.

The novel also portrays Hagen covering up for Michael's brother Fredo when he kills a man in San Francisco, and bailing him out of jail when he attacks his wife's lover. Hagen and Fredo get into an intense argument over Fredo's recklessness and Hagen's blind loyalty to Michael. When Michael has Fredo killed (as originally portrayed in The Godfather Part II), Hagen suspects what really happened, but remains willfully ignorant.

Toward the end of the novel, Hagen personally murders Corleone rival Louie Russo, who conspired with the novel's antagonist, traitorous Corleone caporegime Nick Geraci.

==== The Godfather's Revenge ====
In Winegardner's 2006 novel The Godfather's Revenge, Hagen acts as Michael's right-hand man in dealing with the Shea family, especially Attorney General Danny Shea, who publicly declares war on organized crime. When Hagen's longtime mistress, Judy Buchanan, is murdered by thugs working for Don Carlo Tramonti, Hagen becomes a person of interest in the investigation, though he is later cleared of the charges.

In August 1964, Geraci kidnaps Hagen and drowns him in the Florida Everglades. Geraci then sends Michael a package containing a dead baby alligator along with Hagen's wallet. This message is similar to the one Sonny received following Luca Brasi's death, in which Brasi's bulletproof vest containing two dead fish was delivered to the Corleone compound. Michael later has Geraci ambushed and murdered.

The novel also expands on how Hagen became an unofficial member of the Corleone family. Hagen recalls that when he was living on the streets, he saved Sonny Corleone from a pimp who was notorious for raping and murdering boys. Sonny was so grateful that he brought Hagen home to live with his family.

==== The Family Corleone ====
Edward Falco's The Family Corleone, which takes place before the events of The Godfather, expands upon Tom Hagen joining the Corleone family crime business and becoming the family's consigliere.

== Family ==
- Vito Corleone – Unofficial adopted father
- Carmela Corleone – Unofficial adopted mother
- Santino, Michael, Fredo, and Connie Corleone – Unofficial adopted siblings
- Theresa Hagen – Wife
- Frank and Andrew Hagen – Sons. Frank is played by an uncredited Lou Martini Jr. and Andrew is played in The Godfather by uncredited Richard Fass
- Christina and Gianna Hagen – Daughters
- Martin/Henry Hagen – Father
- Bridget Hagen – Mother
- Unnamed sister

== See also ==
- Sicilian Mafia

Preceded by Michael Corleone	Head of the Corleone crime family The Godfather ca. 1958–1959	Succeeded by Michael Corleone

Preceded by Genco Abbandando	Consigliere of the Corleone crime family The Godfather; 1945–1955	Succeeded by Vito Corleone
