= The Godfather Returns =

2004 novel by Mark Winegardner

- Author: Mark Winegardner
- Language: English
- Series: The Godfather
- Genre: Crime novel
- Publisher: Random House
- Publication date: November 16, 2004
- Publication place: United States
- Media type: Print (Hardback & Paperback) & Audiobook
- Pages: 448 pp (Hardcover), 538 pp (Paperback)
- ISBN: 1-4000-6101-6
- OCLC: 56936487
- Dewey Decimal: 813/.54 22
- LC Class: PS3573.I528 G64 2004b
- Followed by: The Godfather's Revenge

The Godfather Returns is a novel written by author Mark Winegardner, published in 2004. It is the sequel to Mario Puzo's 1969 novel The Godfather and The Sicilian (1984). The publisher, Random House, selected Winegardner to write a sequel after Puzo's death. As the original novel covered the years 1945 to 1955, and included significant backstory on Don Vito Corleone's life, Returns covers the years 1955 to 1962, and includes significant backstory on Michael Corleone's life prior to the first novel. It is the third book in The Godfather series of novels.

It was also published under the name The Godfather: The Lost Years.

== Plot ==
The story picks up immediately after the end of the first novel. The events of the film The Godfather Part II take place within the time frame of this novel, but are only mentioned in the background. Many of Puzo's characters are expanded upon, especially Fredo Corleone, Tom Hagen, and Johnny Fontane, and new characters like Nick Geraci, Danny Shea, and Francesca Corleone are introduced. The other half of the novel goes deeper into Michael's role as Don and his dream of legitimizing the Corleone family. The novel expands on Michael's service in World War II as well as his brother Fredo's secret life. The novel shows how Sonny, Fredo and Tom Hagen join the family business, as well as the deaths of Peter Clemenza and Salvatore Tessio.

The Godfather Returns was followed by The Godfather's Revenge in 2006, also written by Winegardner.

== Background ==
In the 1990s, Puzo had been approached to write a sequel to The Godfather; he declined, but stated that he would not object to a sequel being written by another author after he had died. Several years after Puzo's 1999 death, Random House held a contest to select a potential author: entrants were required to write a synopsis of their proposed book along with a completed sample chapter. Winegardner was selected from several thousand entrants as the author of the new novel.

== Reception ==
Michiko Kakutani, writing in The New York Times, called it "a solid enough performance: dutiful, suspenseful and only occasionally annoying."
