= The Godfather's Revenge =

2006 novel by Mark Winegardner

- Author: Mark Winegardner
- Language: English
- Series: The Godfather
- Genre: Crime novel
- Publisher: Putnam
- Publication date: November 7, 2006
- Publication place: United States
- Media type: Print (Hardback & Paperback) & Audiobook
- Pages: 496 pp (Hardcover), 624 pp (paperback)
- ISBN: 0-399-15384-5
- OCLC: 71288749
- Dewey Decimal: 813/.54 22
- LC Class: PS3573.I528 G645 2006
- Preceded by: The Godfather Returns

The Godfather's Revenge, a 2006 novel written by author Mark Winegardner, is the sequel to his 2004 novel The Godfather Returns. It is the fourth book in The Godfather novel series and is chronologically set last.

The story takes place from 1963 to 1964, and picks up the story from where The Godfather Returns left off. The novel deals with Michael Corleone's guilt over the events of The Godfather Part II, particularly his ordering the death of his brother, Fredo. Subplots include Nick Geraci's plans for revenge against the Corleones, Tom Hagen being implicated in a murder, and organized crime's battle with a presidential family, the Shea family, who are analogous to the Kennedy family.

The novel received mixed reviews and was not authorized by Paramount Pictures, who own the copyright to the Godfather films, though it was authorized by the estate of Mario Puzo, author of the first novel in the series, The Godfather.

== Plot ==
The story begins with Michael Corleone having a dream in which his brother Fredo Corleone, whom he had killed, warns him of a coming threat. At the same time, the apparition tries to give Michael a message, which he does not comprehend. Michael's guilt over ordering Fredo's murder has aged him beyond his years—his hair has turned white, his diabetes has worsened, and he has chronic insomnia. He is also depressed over his failing relationship with his ex-wife, Kay Adams, and his son, Anthony, who both know the truth about Fredo's death.

Carlo Tramonti, a boss of the New Orleans crime syndicate, is introduced as he is deported by the INS to his native Colombia. Meanwhile, Attorney General Daniel Shea (analogous to Robert F. Kennedy) declares war on the Mafia.

Tom Hagen meets with a CIA agent named Joe Lucadello in a Protestant church in Florida. He informs Hagen that Nick Geraci, a former caporegime for the Corleones, has turned up. The book then outlines Nick Geraci's survival in a cave beneath Lake Erie, and how he prepares to take revenge against Michael. Meanwhile, Hagen is implicated in the murder of his longtime mistress, throwing his personal and professional life into disarray.

Meanwhile, President Jimmy Shea (analogous to John F. Kennedy), who was elected in part due to Michael's influence, is assassinated by a Cuban national. While the true motive for his murder is never made clear, the novel suggests it was orchestrated by Tramonti, who wanted revenge for his arrest in a raid ordered by Daniel Shea.

Nick Geraci leaves the cave and reunites with his family, beginning his revenge against Michael Corleone:

- He drowns Tom Hagen in the Florida Everglades. Geraci then sends Michael a package containing a dead baby alligator along with Hagen's wallet, a message similar to the one Sonny Corleone was sent in the original novel following Luca Brasi's death.
- He meets with his old friend Momo Barone, and promises to make him consigliere if he agrees to help. Momo agrees, and provides Geraci information on Michael Corleone's daily routine.
- Geraci contacts Don Anthony Stracci and asks for his help to depose Michael as head of the Commission. Geraci ultimately gets the votes to overthrow Michael.

Stracci asks Geraci to meet Don Greco, the Greek, who due to Stracci's influence was to vote against Michael. Geraci meets him at a restaurant on Staten Island. When he arrives, however, he realizes he has walked him into a trap; Michael arrives and orders Barone to shoot Geraci to prove his loyalty. Geraci grabs the gun, shoots two bodyguards and injures Al Neri, but is mortally wounded in the process. Eddie Paradise delivers the coup de grace, shooting him execution-style.

Michael also executes the following people:

- Carlo Tramonti is shot in the back of his head and his body tossed onto the highway.
- Tramonti's brother, who sought to re-open his brother's murder case, dies of "natural causes".
- Joe Lucadello has an ice pick rammed into his eye.

In the novel's final scene, Michael's sister, Connie, tells him that Fredo had an illegitimate child with Rita Duvall, whom Michael had briefly dated before realizing he was still in love with Kay.

== Reception ==
The novel received mixed critical reviews.

Paramount Pictures sued the Puzo estate for the publication of the novel, and also sought to block publication of The Family Corleone, claiming that it had only authorized publication of one sequel, The Godfather Returns. The lawsuit claimed that the novel tarnished the legacy of the films and misled readers into believing that the novels were authorized by Paramount.
