= Giuseppe Casarrubea =

Italian historian and author

- Born: 4 March 1946; Partinico, Sicily, Italy
- Died: 7 June 2015 (aged 69); Partinico, Italy
- Occupations: Historian and author

Giuseppe Casarrubea (4 March 1946 – 7 June 2015) was an Italian historian and author.

== Life and career ==
Born in Partinico, Casarrubea was headmaster of the high school GB Grassi Privitera in his hometown. The son of one of the victims of Salvatore Giuliano, from the late 1970s he devoted himself to historical research on Giuliano and on the links between Sicilian banditry and politics, publishing several books about the issue. His book Portella della Ginestra. Microstoria di una strage di Stato (translated: "Portella della Ginestra. Micro-history of a massacre by the State") caused quite a stir resulting in legal proceedings, at the end of which he was eventually acquitted of all charges. His works also include essays of educational sociology and historical works mainly focusing on Sicily.

== Selected works ==
- Una alternativa culturale dalla Sicilia occidentale, Trapani, Celebes, 1974.
- I fasci contadini e le origini delle sezioni socialiste della provincia di Palermo, 2 volumes, Palermo, Flaccovio, 1978.
- Uomini e terra a Partinico, Palermo, Vittorietti, 1981.
- Intellettuali e potere in Sicilia. Eretici, riformisti e giacobini nel secolo dei lumi, Palermo, Sellerio, 1983.
- Società e follia in Sicilia. La transizione 1824-1875, Partinico, Cooperativa socio-sanitaria Spazio-salute, 1984.
- I parrocchiani di Partinico e Montelepre. Crisi demografiche e nuclei familiari. Secoli XVII-XIX, Partinico, Centro Jatino di studi e promozione sociale Nicolo Barbato, 1988.
- Il mondo contadino di Salvatore Salomone Marino, tra scienza e mito, Borgetto, 1988.
- L'educazione mafiosa. Strutture sociali e processi di identità, with Pia Blandano, Palermo, Sellerio, 1991.
- Socialisti a Partinico. Le origini: 1893, Partinico, Partito Socialista Italiano-Sezione di Partinico, 1992.
- Nella testa del serpente. Insegnanti e mafia, with Pia Blandano, Molfetta, La Meridiana, 1993. ISBN 88-85221-24-6.
- Gabbie strette. L'educazione in terre di mafia: identità nascoste e progettualità del cambiamento, Palermo, Sellerio, 1996. ISBN 88-389-1271-8.
- Portella della Ginestra. Microstoria di una strage di Stato, Milan, FrancoAngeli, 1997. ISBN 88-464-0162-X.
- Fra' Diavolo e il governo nero. «Doppio Stato» e stragi nella Sicilia del dopoguerra, Milan, FrancoAngeli, 1998. ISBN 88-464-0820-9.
- Portella della Ginestra 50 anni dopo (1947-1997), 3 volumes, Caltanissetta, Sciascia, 1999–2001.
- Salvatore Giuliano. Morte di un capobanda e dei suoi luogotenenti, Milano, FrancoAngeli, 2001. ISBN 88-464-2976-1.
- Storia segreta della Sicilia. Dallo sbarco alleato a Portella della Ginestra, Milan, Bompiani, 2005. ISBN 88-452-3479-7.
- Morte di un agente segreto. Fra Diavolo, la banda Giuliano e il neofascismo in Sicilia (1943-'47), Rome, L'Unità, 2006.
- Stati Uniti, eversione nera e guerra al comunismo in Italia 1943-1947, with Mario José Cereghino, Palermo, Biblioteca comunale di Piana degli Albanesi, 2007.
- Tango Connection. L'oro nazifascista, l'America Latina e la guerra al comunismo in Italia. 1943-1947, Milan, Bompiani, 2007. ISBN 978-88-452-5853-4.
- Lupara nera. La guerra segreta alla democrazia in Italia (1943-1947), with Mario José Cereghino, Milan, Bompiani, 2009. ISBN 978-88-452-6254-8.
- La scomparsa di Salvatore Giuliano. Indagine su un fantasma eccellente, with Mario José Cereghino, Milan, Bompiani, 2011. ISBN 978-88-452-6967-7.
- Piantare uomini. Danilo Dolci sul filo della memoria, Rome, Castelvecchi, 2014. ISBN 978-88-682-6481-9.
