= None Too Fragile Theatre =

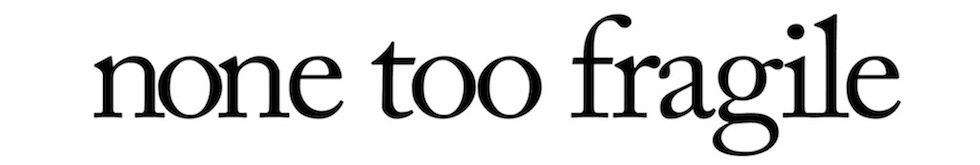
- Formation: 2010
- Type: Theatre group
- Location: 732 W. Exchange St., Akron, OH 44302
- Artistic director(s): Sean Derry, Alanna Romansky
- Website: www.nonetoofragile.com

None Too Fragile Theatre is a regional theater based in Akron, Ohio, United States. Established in 2010 in Cuyahoga Falls, Ohio, the theatre then moved to Pub Bricco in 2012. On July 5, 2019, the theatre announced that it was moving to the former Coach House Theatre at the Akron Woman's City Club. Announcement of the 2024 season has been delayed due to negotiations with the Akron Woman's City Club regarding extension of their 4½ year lease.

The co-founders and Co-Artistic Directors are Sean Derry and Alanna Romansky. Jaysen Mercer is co-founder and managing director.

The black box theater specializes in "cutting-edge fare that challenges conventional thinking."

== See also ==
- Professional Theatre
