= Mark Winegardner =

American novelist (born 1961)

- Born: November 24, 1961 (age 64); Bryan, Ohio, U.S.
- Education: Miami University; George Mason University (MFA)
- Occupation: Writer

Mark Winegardner (born November 24, 1961) is an American writer born and raised in Bryan, Ohio. His novels include The Godfather Returns, Crooked River Burning, and The Veracruz Blues. He published a collection of short stories, That's True of Everybody, in 2002. His newest novel, The Godfather's Revenge, was published in November 2006 by Putnam. His Godfather novels continue the story of the Corleone family depicted in Mario Puzo's The Godfather.

== Writing career ==
He graduated Phi Beta Kappa and magna cum laude from Miami University and went on to receive a Master of Fine Arts degree in fiction writing from George Mason University. He published his first book at age 26, while still in graduate school. He has taught at Miami, George Mason, George Washington University. He joined the faculty at John Carroll University in 1989, and later became the Burroway Professor of English at Florida State University, where he is currently the associate director of Graduate Studies.

Winegardner published his debut work, an autobiographical travel book titled Elvis Presley Boulevard: From Sea to Shining Sea, Almost, in 1987.

In 1990, Winegardner published the nonfiction book Prophet of the Sandlots, about the life of baseball scout Tony Lucadello. While writing the book, Winegardner convinced Lucadello to allow him to travel along with him as he scouted talent. The book was well received by critics at the time of its publication and in retrospective reviews, and has been called one of the greatest baseball books of all time.

After the publication of Sandlots, Winegardner published Steve Fireovid's autobiography, The 26th Man: One Minor Leaguer's Pursuit of a Dream.

Winegardner's debut novel The Veracruz Blues was published in 1996, and centred on five brother's attempt to create a Mexican baseball league that could rival the MLB. He published Crooked River Burning in 2001, to generally positive reviews. The book is set in midcentury Cleveland, Ohio and centers on the relationship between David Zielinsky, an engaged man from a union family, and affluent journalist Anne O'Connor.

He published That's True of Everybody, his debut collection of short stories, in 2002.

=== The Godfather series ===
Winegardner was chosen by Random House to write a sequel to Mario Puzo's novels The Godfather and The Sicilian after the author's death in 1999. The book, titled The Godfather Returns, was published in 2004. It received mixed to positive reviews from critics, with Sarah Vowell of The New York Times calling it "a fine, swirling epic." Publishers Weekly described the book as a "phenomenally entertaining, psychologically rich saga." Philip Kerr called it "an offer you can refuse" in a more critical review for The Guardian.

In 2006, Winegardner published a follow-up titled The Godfather's Revenge. The book received mixed reviews, with praise for its style but criticism for failing to innovate.

== Awards and honors ==
Winegardner has won grants, fellowships and residencies from the Ohio Arts Council, the Lilly Endowment, the Ragdale Foundation, the Sewanee Writers Conference and the Corporation of Yaddo. His books have been chosen as among the best of the year by The New York Times Book Review, the Chicago Sun-Times, the Los Angeles Times, the New York Public Library, and USA Today. His work has appeared in GQ, Playboy, Ploughshares, TriQuarterly, Doubletake, Family Circle, The Sporting News, Witness, Story Quarterly, American Short Fiction, Ladies' Home Journal, Parents and The New York Times Magazine. Several of his stories have been chosen as Distinguished Stories of the Year in The Best American Short Stories.

He is an alumnus of the Ragdale Foundation.

== Publications ==
- Winegardner, Mark. Elvis Presley Boulevard: From Sea to Shining Sea, Almost. New York: Atlantic Monthly Press, 1987.
- Winegardner, Mark. Prophet of the Sandlots: Journeys with a Major League Scout. New York: Atlantic Monthly Press, 1990.
- Fireovid, Steve, and Mark Winegardner. The 26th Man: One Minor Leaguer's Pursuit of a Dream. New York: Macmillan Pub. Co, 1991.
- Winegardner, Mark. The Veracruz Blues. New York: Viking, 1996. ISBN 0670866369 OCLC 32894928
- Winegardner, Mark. We Are What We Ate: 24 Memories of Food. San Diego: Harcourt Brace, 1998.
- Winegardner, Mark. Crooked River Burning. New York: Harcourt, 2001. ISBN 0151002940
- Winegardner, Mark. That's True of Everybody: Stories. New York: Harcourt, 2002.
- Winegardner, Mark, and Mario Puzo. The Godfather Returns. New York: Random House, 2004. ISBN 1400061016 OCLC 56936487 (Released as The Godfather: The Lost Years. in the United Kingdom)
- Winegardner, Mark, and Mario Puzo. The Godfather's Revenge. New York: Putnam, 2006. ISBN 0399153845 OCLC 71288749
