= The Family Corleone =

Novel by Edward Falco

- U.S. first edition cover
- Author: Ed Falco
- Language: English
- Series: The Godfather
- Genre: Crime novel
- Publisher: Grand Central Publishing
- Publication date: May 8, 2012
- Publication place: United States
- Media type: Print (hardback) and audiobook
- Pages: 448
- ISBN: 0446574627
- Preceded by: The Godfather's Revenge

The Family Corleone is a 2012 novel by Ed Falco, based on an unproduced screenplay by Mario Puzo, who died in 1999. It is the prequel to Puzo's The Godfather. It was published by Grand Central Publishing and released May 8, 2012. It is the fifth book published in The Godfather novel series but, being a prequel, it is chronologically set first, albeit after Chapter 14 of The Godfather (which recounts Vito Corleone's life from his childhood in Sicily to the beginnings of his criminal empire in New York City, filmed as the flashback sequences in The Godfather Part II).

The novel, set in the Great Depression at the end of Prohibition, tells of how Vito Corleone consolidated his power to become the most powerful Don in New York City. Also, it tells of Sonny Corleone's inauguration into the family business and Tom Hagen's graduation from being an adopted member of the Corleone family before becoming the consigliere. The novel also reveals how Luca Brasi first became associated with the Corleones, and introduces a number of new characters, including the crime boss Giuseppe Mariposa. The novel elaborates upon background information and situations originally mentioned in passing in The Godfather.

== Plot ==
In 1933 New York City, 17-year-old Sonny Corleone is aware that his father Vito Corleone's olive oil business is a cover for his Mafia activities. With Prohibition ending, and tensions between the organized crime groups in the city rising, the impulsive Sonny wishes to join his father's criminal empire.

== Reception ==
Reception for the novel was mixed to positive, with George De Stefano in New York Journal of Books arguing that "Ed Falco deftly pulls off a feat of literary necromancy, bringing back to life one of the most iconic figures in American popular culture: Don Vito Corleone." The Washington Post's Patrick Anderson wrote, "Falco has captured Puzo's rich prose style and eye for detail. If you want to read another installment of the Corleone story, The Family Corleone is a solid piece of work." Kirkus Reviews gave it a positive review, calling it: "A worthy addition to the lurid world of the Five Families."

== Film adaptation ==
The estate of Puzo had sought to keep Paramount Pictures from producing a feature film based on the novel. The case was resolved with Paramount gaining the rights to make more Godfather films.

== Audiobook ==
An audiobook of The Family Corleone read by Bobby Cannavale was produced by Hachette Audio.
