= Luca Brasi =

Fictional character in The Godfather

- Luca Brasi, as portrayed by Lenny Montana in The Godfather
- First appearance: The Godfather
- Last appearance: The Godfather: The Game
- Created by: Mario Puzo
- Portrayed by: Lenny Montana

In-universe information
- Gender: Male
- Title(s): Soldato, enforcer
- Occupation: Gangster
- Relatives: Kelly O'Rourke (lover, murder victim); O'Rourke child (biological child, murder victim)

Luca Brasi is a fictional character in Mario Puzo's 1969 novel The Godfather, as well as its 1972 film adaptation. In the film, he was portrayed by Lenny Montana, an ex-wrestler and former bodyguard and enforcer for the Colombo crime family.

== Fictional character biography ==
=== Backstory ===
Luca Brasi is Don Vito Corleone's personal enforcer and the only man Vito himself fears. While slow-witted and brutish, Brasi is fiercely loyal with a reputation as a savage and remorseless killer. He once murdered six men single-handedly to protect Don Corleone; only when Vito himself ordered him to stop did Brasi end his rampage, which contributed significantly to ending the "Olive Oil War". Brasi's loyalty to Don Corleone and the Corleone family is unquestioned; he is said to have killed a Corleone soldier just for making the family look bad.

In a notable incident, Brasi intercepted two hitmen sent by Al Capone to assassinate Don Corleone. Brasi subdued both men with his bare hands before binding and gagging them with towels. Then, as one hitman watched Brasi brutally dismember and butcher the other hitman with an axe, he became terrified and choked to death on one of the towels Brasi had gagged him with.

An old Sicilian woman, who had once worked as the neighborhood midwife, tells Vito's youngest son Michael that, years earlier, she attended a young Irish girl as she gave birth to Brasi's child. Brasi forced the midwife to throw the silent infant into a burning furnace, saying he wanted none of "that race" to live and a few days later, murdered the girl. Fearing she would be next, the distraught midwife sought the Corleone family's help. Don Corleone intervened, protecting the woman while covering up Brasi's crime and bringing him into his family, thus gaining Brasi's undying service and loyalty.

=== In The Godfather ===
Brasi is surprised to be invited to Connie Corleone's wedding. To show his respect and gratitude, he personally presents the Don with a large cash gift for his daughter's bridal purse, which Brasi intends to be the largest sum given, in addition to a pledge of loyalty to Connie and her future children. During the reception, Michael's girlfriend Kay Adams asks him about Brasi. Michael relates the story of how his father once helped his godson, Johnny Fontane, back when Fontane's career was just starting to take off. Don Corleone had offered bandleader Les Halley $10,000 to release Fontane from his contract when he learned that Halley was unfairly exploiting his godson's fame. His offer refused, Vito returned the next day accompanied by Brasi and his then-consigliere Genco Abbandando. He then repeated his offer to Halley at gunpoint, this time telling him that either his signature or his brains would wind up on the contract. Halley agreed, accepting Corleone's payment of $10,000 (in the film, the payment is $1,000).

Suspicious of drug kingpin Virgil "The Turk" Sollozzo and his dealings with the Tattaglia family, Don Corleone orders Brasi to feign dissatisfaction working for the Corleones and convince Sollozzo that he is willing to work for him as a means of gathering information. Bruno Tattaglia then arranges a meeting between Brasi and Sollozzo at his nightclub as a ruse to kill him. Sollozzo impales Brasi's hand into a table while Tattaglia's men strangle Brasi to death with piano wire. Sometime later, the Corleone family receives a package containing Brasi's custom-made bulletproof vest wrapped around a dead fish, an old Sicilian message that means Brasi "sleeps with the fishes."

When Michael succeeds his father as Don of the Corleone family, Brasi's role as personal enforcer/bodyguard is filled by Al Neri, whom Michael "has ma[d]e...his Luca Brasi".

== In other media ==
Luca Brasi plays a major role in the prequel novel The Family Corleone by Ed Falco. During the Great Depression, Luca Brasi is the leader of a small but feared street gang with ties to Sonny Corleone, who uses them as muscle to aid his family. The younger Brasi is described as a psychopath and a drug addict who has his own newborn child murdered by forcing an old woman to throw it alive into a burning furnace, and then brutally murders the child's mother, Irish-American prostitute Kelly O'Rourke. He also plans to kill Corleone associate Tom Hagen for having a one-night stand with Kelly, a feud that Vito settles by paying Brasi off. Brasi spends the money on more drugs. The resulting overdose causes him to suffer a complete mental breakdown that makes him even more unstable and dangerous. Although Vito fears and dislikes Brasi, he eventually recruits the brutal thug into his crime family, knowing that Brasi's formidable reputation would intimidate the Corleone family's enemies.

Brasi has a larger role in The Godfather: The Game. At his daughter's wedding, Vito accepts Brasi's gift and instructs him to track down the protagonist, Aldo Trapani, who has fallen in with a local gang. Brasi finds Aldo getting beaten up and intervenes, acting as a "trainer" for players by teaching them how to fight and defend themselves. He also trains players in the use of firearms and weapons, and explains how to manage rackets, use safe houses, and deal with the other Mafia families. Later in the game, the player is sent to accompany Brasi to his fateful meeting with Virgil Sollozzo on Tattaglia family turf; after witnessing Brasi's murder, the player has to eliminate Brasi's killer before escaping and informing the family of his death.

The Brand New song "Luca", from their 2006 album The Devil and God Are Raging Inside Me, is named for Brasi. The song's second verse and bridge make reference to his drowning.

Brasi inspired Baton Rouge rapper Kevin Gates to create his 2013 mixtape, The Luca Brasi Story, and its sequel, Luca Brasi 2, hosted by DJ Drama and released on December 15, 2014.

According to film historian Laurent Bouzereau, the scene in Return of the Jedi in which Princess Leia strangles crime boss Jabba the Hutt to death with the very chain he used to bind her to his throne was inspired by Brasi's death scene in The Godfather.

In the pilot episode of The Sopranos, Christopher Moltisanti erroneously quotes the famous "Luca Brasi sleeps with the fishes" phrase, saying "Louis Brasi sleeps with the fishes" instead.

In Men in Black: International, the personal bodyguard of arms dealer Riza Stavros, played by Spencer Wilding, is named Luca Brasi.

Luca Brasi is mentioned in the song "I Am the Mob" by Welsh band Catatonia from their 1998 album International Velvet.

He is the namesake of the Tasmanian rock band Luca Brasi.
