= Salvatore Giuliano =

Sicilian bandit (1922–1950)

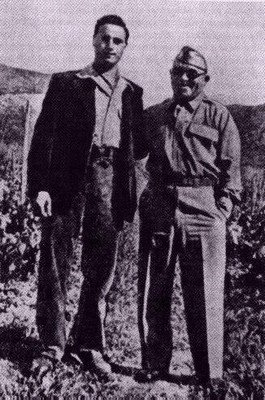
- Giuliano (left) with Mafia boss Vito Genovese in 1940
- Born: 16 November 1922; Montelepre, Sicily, Kingdom of Italy
- Died: 5 July 1950 (aged 27); Castelvetrano, Sicily, Italy
- Cause of death: Gunshot wounds
- Other names: Turiddu, Turi
- Organization: Sicilian Independence Movement

Salvatore Giuliano (Italian: [salvaˈtoːre dʒuˈljaːno]; Sicilian: Turiddu or Sarvaturi Giulianu; 16 November 1922 – 5 July 1950) was a Sicilian brigand, who rose to prominence in the disorder that followed the Allied invasion of Sicily in 1943. In September of that year, Giuliano became an outlaw after shooting and killing a police officer who tried to arrest him for black market food smuggling, at a time when 70 per cent of Sicily's food supply was provided by the black market. He maintained a band of subordinates for most of his career. He was a flamboyant, high-profile criminal, attacking the police at least as often as they sought him. In addition, he was a local power-broker in Sicilian politics between 1945 and 1948, including his role as a nominal colonel for the Movement for the Independence of Sicily. He and his band were held legally responsible for the Portella della Ginestra massacre, though there is some doubt about their role in the numerous deaths which occurred.

The widespread international press coverage he attracted made him an embarrassment to the Italian government, and throughout his banditry, up to 2,000 police and soldiers were deployed against him. He was murdered on 5 July 1950. The historian Eric Hobsbawm described him as the last of the "people's bandits" (à la Robin Hood) and the first to be covered in real time by modern mass media.

== Biography ==
=== Early life ===
Giuliano was born on 16 November 1922, in Montelepre, a rural village in western Sicily, the fourth and youngest child of Salvatore Giuliano, Sr. and Maria Lombardo. His parents were landed peasants who had spent some of their earlier lives in the United States where they had earned the money to buy their farmland.

Giuliano—also known as Turi or Turridu, to distinguish him from his father—attended primary school in the village from the age of 10 to 13. Although he was a good student, when his older brother Giuseppe was drafted into the Italian armed forces in 1935, he left school to help his father cultivate the family farm. He soon tired of the drudgery of farm work, hired a substitute from the village to take his place, and began trading in olive oil, which brought additional income to the family. Later in life, he claimed that he quit school as much from youthful impulsiveness as from economic necessity.

The outbreak of World War II brought him opportunities in the form of jobs installing road barriers and telephone infrastructure. He performed well, but was dismissed from both jobs after disputes with his bosses. At the time of the Allied Invasion of Sicily in July 1943, Giuliano was once again trading in olive oil.

=== Outlaw career ===
The most immediate trouble caused by the Allied invasion was the breakdown of government structures and the legal distribution of food. Especially in the cities, up to 70% of the food was supplied through the black market, including small-scale operators to large-scale, well-financed and well-organized operations. With a horse brought home from the war by his brother and a Beretta handgun for protection, Giuliano was soon a participant in the black market.

The Allied Military Government for Occupied Territories (AMGOT) used the remnants of the previous fascist government, especially the Polizia and Carabinieri, to suppress the black market. Since their pay was irregular and most of their income was bribes from major black marketeers, they focused their attention on minor operators. On 2 September 1943, Giuliano was caught at a Carabinieri checkpoint transporting two sacks of black market grain. While trying to negotiate his release in return for surrendering the grain, Giuliano drew his gun when another black marketeer was apprehended. When one of the officers raised his weapon, Giuliano shot and killed him. He was shot in the back as he fled. After the escape and an operation arranged by his family, he hid out in the family home.

On Christmas Eve 1943, the Carabinieri moved into Montelepre to apprehend Giuliano. The operation included mass arrests—a dragnet. He escaped, but angered by the dragnet, he shot and killed another officer. Benefitting from his intimate knowledge of the surrounding mountainous terrain Giulano was able to evade the authorities, while visiting his family occasionally. On 30 January 1944, he helped the escape of eight fellow villagers from the jail in Monreale. Six of them joined him and formed a band that was able to expand operations.

With no income and outside of the law, Giuliano turned to banditry, and later extortion and kidnapping. His exclusive target was the wealthy, partly from identification with poor peasants, but mostly for efficiency—the rich had more money. Thanks to Sicily's omerta tradition, local peasants were reluctant to cooperate with law enforcement, and Giuliano made them his allies and effective co-conspirators. Throughout his career, he paid up to ten times the going market rate for his supplies to the locals. They became good sources of intelligence about rich targets for his crimes, as well as law enforcement activity. While Giuliano's core band was never larger than 20 men, peasants from Montelepre and nearby Giardinello would join him in the mountains temporarily for the excellent pay the bandit offered. This pattern continued until the last few beleaguered months of his career.

The bandit also won allegiance by enforcing rough justice in the area he came to dominate. On at least one occasion, he killed a rogue bandit committing crimes in his name. He shot Montelepre's postmaster for stealing parcels from America. Storekeeper Giuseppe Terranova was executed for extortionate prices and usury. He intervened with a local gabelotto, an estate manager, to lease land to farmers from Montelepre.

If benevolence failed, Giuliano killed informers and enemies ruthlessly. Whenever possible they were allowed a minute to pray before death and a note of responsibility was left; to warn other spies, and to make sure that neither Giuliano nor other bandits would be accused of crimes they didn't commit. From time to time, he and his men would attack Carabinieri and Polizia outposts and patrols, often killing lawmen. They killed 87 Carabinieri and 33 Polizia from 1943–49.

Giuliano was admired for his bravery and resistance. But even more because he routinely prevailed in contests of power. In Sicilian culture, a person's value is often judged by how independent they are and whether they can defend themselves and deal with their own poblems.

Newspaper reports.

The bandit's most famous exploit occurred early in his career in 1944—the robbery of the Duchess of Pratameno. He and his men sneaked into her estate unnoticed, and Giuliano was in her salon before she knew what was occurring. He kissed her hand and showed respect for her noble status, but then demanded all of her jewellery. When she refused, Giuliano threatened to kidnap her children. After she handed the loot over, he took a diamond ring from her hand, which he wore for the rest of his life, and borrowed John Steinbeck's In Dubious Battle from her library before leaving (which was returned with a respectful note a week later). By mid-1945, Giuliano's daring, good looks, and theatrical flair were the talk of Sicily, and soon beyond.

=== MIS, EVIS, kidnapping and extortion ===
In April 1945 venturing onto the larger stage of politics, Giuliano issued a public declaration of his support for MIS, the Movement for the Independence of Sicily (also referred to as Separatism). Separatism coalesced in the aftermath of the invasion, drawing on long-simmering anger at Sicily's neglect by the central government, and the sudden fluidity of the political situation. The movement was dealt a severe blow when, for political and war strategy reasons, the Allies, who had courted, if not encouraged, separatist leaders, handed control of Sicily to the Badoglio government in Rome in February 1944. Strong sentiment for independence still existed in Sicily, but the three main Italian political parties of post-war Italy, Christian Democratic, Communist, and Socialist—were all opposed to Sicilian independence. After a government-enabled campaign of violent repression, the MIS decided to augment its political campaign with armed resistance. Their small armed contingent, the EVIS, operated in Catania Province in eastern Sicily. To strengthen their forces and divert attention from their army, the leaders of MIS and EVIS enlisted Giuliano, who, after negotiating for substantial funding, accepted the rank of Colonel and agreed to conduct an armed campaign in his zone. He recruited 40–60 young men (in addition to his regular band), provided them with uniforms, ranks, and weapons, and trained them. Among the recruits was Gaspare Pisciotta, nicknamed Aspanu. He and Giuliano would be virtually inseparable friends for the rest of Giuliano's life, and by the end of the MIS military campaign, Pisciotta would become his second-in-command, also for the rest of the chieftain's life. Contrary to many reports, the Montelepre native was neither a cousin nor a close childhood friend of Giuliano.

On 27 December 1945, Giuliano launched his insurrection with an attack on a Carabinieri outpost—two days before the MIS army was put out of existence at San Mauro. Their campaign, the most publicly spectacular of the bandits' career, created havoc for the police forces and government. Martial law was declared in Montelepre and the surrounding region on 13 January 1946, and continued for 126 days—at times incorporating army units. Giuliano's campaign was so effective that up to 500 police officers and soldiers were deployed against him. During the MIS campaign, the national Minister of the Interior Giuseppe Romita offered 800,000 lire for the capture of Giuliano—who responded with a 2 million lire reward for the capture of Romita. The chieftain and his men eventually realized the political hopelessness of their situation, and the revolt dissolved, as the new recruits went back to their ordinary lives. Giuliano helped at least 2 of his men to emigrate to the U.S. The EVIS campaign drew widespread news coverage, and made the bandit an international figure.

After the revolt, the MIS resumed its political campaign, which was plagued by poor organization. Through surrogates, Giuliano campaigned for the MIS in the towns where he was the major power. On 2 June 1946 Giardinello, Monreale, and Montelepre voted heavily for the Separatists, but island-wide, they received only 9% of the vote.

For the rest of 1946 and until his death, Giuliano's main activity and source of revenue was kidnapping, often carried out by the squad of Antonio Terranova, the bandit's most formidable and resourceful operative. Giuliano and his men treated their captives well—almost chivalrously—often giving them favourite foods, reading to them to alleviate boredom, and providing necessary medicines. Negotiations were usually conducted through various mafiosi. More than one kidnap victim remembered time with Giuliano in a positive light, despite its hardships. Giuliano also used the threat of kidnapping to extort money from wealthy Sicilians—some preferred kidnapping because the bandit stuck to his own rule that no one would be kidnapped twice, while the number of extortions had no limit.

=== Portella della Ginestra ===
Giuliano's next foray into politics ended in disaster. In the 1947 Sicilian regional election, the MIS won 9% of the vote but began a steady deterioration from which it never recovered. The winner of the election with 30% of the vote was the Popular Bloc, Communists-Socialists, against less than 20% for the Christian Democrats. The island's conservatives and reactionaries were alarmed and called on Giuliano for help. Their main aim was to intimidate the peasantry and thwart calls for land reform and redistribution. Although Giuliano identified with the peasantry and had progressive ideas for land reform close to left-wing doctrine, he was staunchly anti-Communist, based on stories of the U.S. he heard from his parents. This, and his practical desire for a pardon from Sicily's power brokers, inclined him to cooperate with the existing, predominantly right-wing power structure against the left. Giuliano may have been influenced by his interview early in 1947 with US pulp journalist Michael Stern. The American wore his WWII journalist sergeant's uniform to lend himself official credibility during his interview. Giuliano spoke to Stern as though the writer represented the US government, presenting a letter addressed to President Truman. The bandit emphasized his antipathy for Communism to Stern, who did nothing to discourage the bandit's mistaken notion that he was an official representative of the U.S. government. The interview led to a 5-page article in Life magazine, (23 Feb 1948, pp. 60–64). Stern's subterfuge may have unwittingly influenced the bandit to cooperate with the Sicilian right.

The target of the right-wing vested interests was a famous annual May Day celebration at the Portella della Ginestra. A few days before the festivities, Giuliano received a letter that was evidently the culmination of negotiations. After reading it, the bandit chieftain burned it and announced, "The hour of our liberation has come. We are going to attack the Communists, to go to fire on them on 1 May at Portella della Ginestra". One of his bandits protested that women and children would be present. The chieftain replied that only leaders would be targeted. Giuliano's behaviour before and after the armed action indicates that he believed that he and his men would be offered pardons for their crimes if all went well on May Day, an outcome ostensibly guaranteed by some prominent Sicilian. According to Giuliano's later statements, his main aim of the day was the capture of Girolamo Li Causi, head of the Communist party of Sicily—any other action was a diversionary tactic to facilitate Li Causi's capture. Although scheduled to speak, Li Causi did not attend.

Between 3000 and 5000 peasants attended. As the official proceedings began, three volleys of gunfire erupted from an ambush on adjoining Mount Pizzuta. Bullets from the third volley went into the crowds. The result was mass terror and many casualties—11 dead (including a woman and 3 children) and between 2 and 3 dozen wounded. Giuliano, the perpetrator of massed gunfire along with his band, left the scene quickly and surreptitiously, reportedly unaware of the massacre. When he learned what had transpired, he was distraught over the deaths and angry that his plans had gone awry.

The reaction throughout Italy was a profound shock, followed by demands to punish the perpetrators. Initial suspicion fell on the Sicilian Mafia and Sicily's large landowners. Characteristically, major Mafiosi in the area had alibis so good that Sicilians and others knowledgeable in their ways assumed that they had been arranged in advance. Some of their local chieftains had also given warnings to likely May Day celebrants before the event. There were reports of four armed local Mafiosi leaving the Portella area shortly after the massacre, but when Giuliano's involvement became known, the investigation of the Mafia halted, and the bandits became the inquiry's focus. Giuliano and his men were isolated and a convenient target for officialdom, while the Mafia was well-connected politically and difficult to deal with.

Pisciotta and eleven other members of the Giuliano band were convicted of the massacre in 1952. While alive, Giuliano himself made various, somewhat inconsistent statements about the matter, always insisting that the bloodshed was unintended. He threatened to reveal the names of the men behind his actions, but never did. During the trial for the massacre, Pisciotta named the main conspirators as Leone Marchesano, a Palermo Mafioso and politician, and Prince Giuseppe Alliata of Monreale, with politician Cusumano Geloso as their intermediary—Pisciotta met only Geloso. His claims were confirmed by a letter delivered in 1969 to Giuseppe Montalbano, a long-time leftist opponent of the reactionary establishment of Sicily. The writer, Antonio Ramirez—a prominent Palermo politician—ordered the letter delivered after his death. It stated that Gioacchino Barbera, a ranking Mafioso, had confirmed Pisciotta's accusations concerning Sicilian power brokers, and also confirmed Giuliano's claim that the main conspirators did not intend the massacre. Barbera revealed all this to Ramirez during a December 1951 conversation. Billy Jaynes Chandler concludes that Sicily's reactionary establishment was the casus belli of the massacre, but that thanks to omerta and time, the details will never be revealed. A plaque erected by leftists in memory of the victims at Portella della Ginestra blames "landed barons and the Mafia":

On 1 May 1947, here, on the rock of Barbato, celebrating the working class festival and the victory of 20 April, the people of Piana degli Albanesi, San Giuseppe Jato, and San Ciprirello, men, women and children, fell under the ferocious barbarity of the bullets of the Mafia and the landed barons, who mowed down innocent victims in order to put an end to the struggle of the peasants for liberation from the servitude of feudalism. The slaughter horrified the world. The blood of new martyrs consecrated in the conscience of the people the resolve to continue the struggle for the redemption of the land in a world of liberty and peace.

For the remainder of 1947, Giuliano maintained a low public profile while continuing his kidnap and ransom enterprise, occasionally engaging in ambushes and firefights with the law forces as opportunities presented themselves or to assert dominance in his area of operations. The killing of a Carabiniere colonel in October 1947 occasioned a brief incursion of 1000 law enforcers and mass arrests, but failed to capture Giuliano or any member of his band. In January 1948, Giuliano and Pisciotta felt secure enough to make an early evening appearance in a popular cafe in the town of Carini. The event was covered well by the Sicilian press, which speculated that it followed a tryst in the same town.

=== Final political campaign ===
After the Portella della Ginestra massacre, Giuliano's family was interrogated regularly and often incarcerated. (His house was under such surveillance that he could no longer visit.) Moved by their plight and desperate for some sort of pardon, the bandit once again answered the call of conservative politicians to work on their behalf in the 1948 elections.

In 1948, the parties of the Italian right and centre were determined to undo the left's 1947 victory, and they were seeking every possible vote. The politicians couldn't afford to ignore the votes Giuliano controlled. Leone Marchesano, Santo Fleres, head of the Sicilian Mafia and the Liberal Party in Partinico, and prominent Christian Democrat Bernardo Mattarella from the Mafia stronghold of Castellamare del Golfo all talked directly with Giuliano—who would not campaign without promises from the highest level of Sicilian power brokers. He was guaranteed a full pardon if he delivered a large majority of the votes in his district. He delivered extravagant majorities for the centre-right's victory on 18 April. The bandit waited for weeks after the election for word of his pardon—and he was finally informed that Minister of the Interior Mario Scelba, himself a Sicilian, had denied it, and advised that Giuliano and his men could emigrate to Brazil, where Prince Alliata had vast estates and the bandits would be protected.

Giuliano, who had held up his end of a bargain, was outraged and promised retaliation. Shortly after seeing his mother and Mariannina for what would be the last time at a June picnic in the countryside, the bandit learned that, besides the broken promise of a pardon, Santo Fleres' Mafia faction was informing law enforcement of Giuliano's movements. On 17 July 1948, two local Partinico bandits, hired by Giuliano, assassinated Fleres in that town's square. Thereafter, most of the Mafia organizations worked against Giuliano, effectively sealing his eventual fate. In the first action by any Mafiosi after Fleres' death, Giuliano opted out late from a law enforcement-Mafia fake escape to Tunisia by speedboat, probably forewarned by a still friendly Mafia faction or politician. Law enforcement also stepped up its own campaign against the bandit—from the middle of 1948 until Giuliano's death, Montelepre was occupied in some state of siege by law enforcement, making the inhabitants' lives miserable. By the end of the year, all of his family was imprisoned.

Toward the end of 1948, a bit of relief arrived in the person of Maria Cyliakus, a Swedish dilettante journalist estranged from her Greek industrialist husband. Through audacity and luck, she managed to visit, interview, and photograph Giuliano in the mountains, enhancing his notoriety throughout Europe, and giving Cyliakus her own burst of celebrity status.

=== Bellolampo and final actions ===
Although Giuliano was under considerable duress by the beginning of 1949, he still had strengths to draw from. While his core band was diminished, men from the vicinity would still join him for the high wages he offered until the last months of 1949. His kidnapping and extortion rackets still produced sufficient income. For the first eight months of the year, he dominated the forces of law in his bailiwick, staging numerous ambushes and occasionally attacking their headquarters.

The publicity from Giuliano's continued mastery over the forces of law and order caused great consternation to Italy's Christian Democratic government, and in August, Minister of the Interior Scelba dispatched Colonel Ugo Luca, commander of Carabinieri in Lazio, to "observe" enforcement activity in Sicily, then overseen by Ciro Verdiani. Aged 58 and known as the "Italian Lawrence", Luca had a stellar military record, especially distinguished in intelligence work, and had been recommended to Scelba as a possible replacement for Verdiani. When Giuliano learned that Verdiani and Luca planned to visit the Bellolampo Carabinieri outpost between Palermo and Montelepre on 19 August, he prepared an ambush. After the two officials made a quick inspection, Giuliano and his men detonated a large explosion on the road under their convoy on its return to Palermo. Eight men were killed, and over ten were wounded. Had Luca and Verdiani returned in the vehicle they had ridden to Bellolampo, they would have been seriously wounded or killed. As a direct result, Verdiani was sent to Italy's Alpine region, and Luca was dispatched to Sicily, along with 500 additional Carabinieri, to head up the campaign against Giuliano.

=== Colonel Ugo Luca ===
Luca would be Giuliano's last state opponent. His second-in-command was Captain Antonio Perenze, who had fought against guerrillas in Libya and Ethiopia. After initial demonstrations of bravado in the field by the two leaders, Luca implemented his 'isolate and neutralize' strategy. He began by dividing the bandits' operational area into seventy zones, each to be patrolled by 20 men, who were given superior radio communications equipment demanded by Luca. Most of the men assumed civilian dress. They remained in the field, not retreating to safe stations and barracks each night. They were also ordered to cultivate good relations with the populace, eschewing pointless intimidation. Luca also sought to infiltrate the band or turn some of its members. Other officials had used similar tactics, but none were as thorough and relentless as the colonel.

Shortly after Luca's arrival, a meeting of major Mafiosi decreed that its members were to work with the colonel to eliminate the bandits. The Mafia men did not want a law officer of Luca's calibre on the island any longer than necessary. Mafiosi all over western Sicily received and forwarded information to the task force.

Giuliano was isolated and his operations essentially crippled by October. None of his attacks on the Carabinieri or Polizia during Luca's command were successful. Only one of the 120 law officers killed by Giuliano and his band met his end during Luca's command. Individual arrests of bandits began in late September, and on 13 October, most of Giuliano's key squad and its leader, Giuseppe Cucinella, were captured in a gun battle in Palermo. Cucinella and his men had been located and Luca informed by Mafiosi from Palermo. Smaller scale arrests, following the same pattern took place throughout the colonel's campaign.

Under duress in the territory he formerly dominated, Giuliano (and sometimes Pisciotta) surrendered most of his independence and retreated to the protection of a Mafia branch in Castelvetrano, near the south coast, headed by Nicola 'The American' Piccione, repatriated from a successful career in the United States. The bandit's primary residence while in the Castelvetrano region was the home, in the heart of the city, of Gregorio de Maria, a childhood friend of Piccione's subordinate Giuseppe 'Pino' Marotta. De Maria, an erudite and reclusive attorney, formed a bond with Giuliano as the bandit's intellectual mentor.

Although Ciro Verdiani had been replaced and dispatched, he maintained his contacts and continued to meddle in Sicily. To spite Luca and their mutual superiors, in December 1949 he arranged for Jacopo Rizza of Oggi magazine to interview Giuliano and Pisciotta in the countryside near Salemi. The interview, published in successive issues of the weekly, caused a sensation and embarrassed the government. Verdiani did much more, meeting with Giuliano near Castelvetrano, also in December. He agreed to help Giuliano and Pisciotta into exile, although his ultimate aim was almost certainly to kill the bandits and claim credit for the deed. The two men remained in contact until the last day of Giuliano's life, but in the end, Verdiani's machinations failed.

=== Death ===
In January 1950, a Sicilian carabiniere, Giovanni Lo Bianco, coerced Giuliano's treasurer, Benedetto Minasola, into betraying the bandit. Minasola set up band members to be captured by the authorities one at a time until April, when Giuliano had no more active operatives. Minasola was then able to persuade Pisciotta to betray his closest friend—Pisciotta was an easy target, having long doubted Verdiani's plot to get himself and Giuliano out of the country.

On 19 June, Pisciotta met with Colonel Luca and agreed to work with him to eliminate Giuliano. After deliberation and intrigue among Luca's command, it was decided to kill Giuliano on the morning of 5 July in Castelvetrano. Pisciotta would lure Giuliano out to the street, and a squad of Carabinieri led by Captain Perenze would assassinate the bandit chieftain. Unfortunately for Luca, one of Verdiani's partisans was at the planning meeting, and Verdiani sent Giuliano a letter warning of Pisciotta's betrayal. When Pisciotta arrived at the de Maria house after midnight on 5 July, Giuliano confronted him with Verdiani's communique—somehow, Pisciotta convinced him that he was more trustworthy than the policeman but did not dare to suggest they leave the house for the ambush. After both men lay down, ostensibly to sleep, Pisciotta waited until Giuliano was asleep. He then shot him twice, killing him instantly. Pisciotta ran outside, told a waiting Perenze what he'd done, and was spirited out of town. Perenze and his squad hauled Giuliano's corpse to a nearby courtyard, shot it with several rounds, and, with Luca, concocted a story of an informer, Giuliano's plan to flee the country by plane from Mazzara del Vallo, and the bandit's death in a running gun battle.

The next morning, Luca and Perenze repeated the story to the press in the courtyard, while visitors traipsed through to see Giuliano's body. Many observers, especially locals who had heard rumours that didn't coincide with the official account, were sceptical of the official story. In the afternoon, after the body had been moved to the local morgue, Maria Lombardo arrived. She fainted upon seeing the body, was revived, and identified her son. She insisted on kissing the bloodstains on the ground where he had lain in the courtyard.

Because of official wrangling, the body remained in Castelvetrano until 19 July (allowing hundreds of locals to view it in the interim). The burial in Montelepre that afternoon was private, on official orders to prevent publicity.

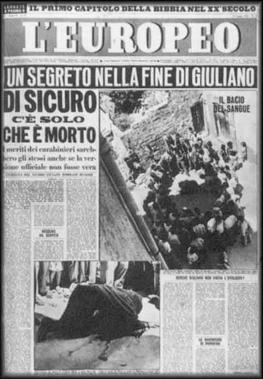
Cover of L'Europeo of July 1950 about the mysterious death of Giuliano

The official story was unravelled by Tommaso Besozzi of the Milanese weekly L'Europeo. In the 16 and 24 July issues, he named Pisciotta as the murderer, but substituted misleading initials for Minasola. In spite of later official testimony by Pisciotta, de Maria, and Perenze confirming Besozzi's reportage, the concocted story remains as the official account.

Pisciotta remained at large until 5 December, when he emerged from a concealed space in his family's home and was arrested. He had been hiding there since shortly after Giuliano's murder, when the Carabinieri command, who could not grant the amnesty he sought, turned him loose.

=== Viterbo trial ===
A trial, which officially concerned the massacre at Portella della Ginestra, was convened at Viterbo, Lazio on 12 June 1950, but was quickly adjourned and reconvened in 1951. It then spun into a wide examination of Giuliano's career. There were thirty-six defendants, all with attorneys, many of whom wanted to expand the scope of the trial to embarrass the conservative government. All of the defendants except Pisciotta denied even being present at the May Day event. Pisciotta named many of the names previously cited, but also included Mario Scelba, Minister of the Interior. His revelations often occurred during barely coherent outbursts—his behaviour indicated a man in the grip of fear and uncertainty. On 11 May 1951, he admitted murdering Giuliano.

A great deal of testimony, some of the most dramatic of the proceedings, concerned a reputed diary that Giuliano kept, naming the powerful politicians with whom he collaborated. Pisciotta, Perenze, Luca, Marotta, and especially de Maria figured in its saga. De Maria was accused by a Mafioso, Stefano de Peri, of telling him that he had destroyed the memoirs. None of the accused admitted to knowing what became of Giuliano's journal. Testimony concluded late in 1951, and in May 1952, twelve defendants, including Terranova and Pisciotta, were sentenced for life; four were given shorter sentences, and the remainder were acquitted. More trials followed: the last arrest of a Giuliano confederate on related charges was in 1964, and the last prisoner among them was released by 1980.

=== Deaths of participants ===
On 10 February 1954, a few days after he talked to Pietro Scaglione, an assistant prosecutor from Palermo, Pisciotta was assassinated by poison in his cell at Ucciardone Prison in Palermo while breakfasting with his cellmate father. The dose was a substantial 20 centigrams of strychnine, enough to kill 40 dogs. When Ciro Verdiani and Cusumano Geloso died before their natural life expectancies, suspicions of poisoning were voiced. Benedetto Minasola was murdered in 1960. The Mafioso suspected of poisoning Pisciotta was shot in 1961, and Scaglione was killed by the Mafia while serving as Prosecutor General of Palermo in 1971.

== Historical context and interpretation ==
Non-academic authors vary widely in their assessment of Giuliano.

Michael Stern's first impression of the bandit was "Errol Flynn portraying Pancho Villa". Gavin Maxwell pointed out that Giuliano was a romantic, hankering after justice from an early age—the bandit's favorite author, Emilio Salgari, made a career from idealistic, romantic novels, and Giuliano was still reading them in his twenties living rough in the mountains. Gaia Servadio sees the bandit as a tool of the Mafia, whose notoriety and success were not the product of his personal qualities, but entirely a function of his mafioso protectors. She judges that he was easily eliminated once the protectors withdrew their support. For John Dickie, the "truth" of Giuliano resides not in his character, but in the tangle of power and politics that enmeshed his life, centred on the Mafia. Natalia Danesi Murray described Giuliano as a "theatrical megalomaniac."

The academics Monte Finkelstein and Eric Hobsbawm both emphasize Giuliano's historical role as an instrument of the existing power elite of Sicily. Finkelstein characterizes him as, "a tool of the landowners and conservatives... manipulated to slaughter innocent peasants in the name of halting Communism." Hobsbawm notes ambiguity and naivete in Giuliano's political role:

Giuliano became the plaything of political forces he did not understand, when he allowed himself to become the military leader of the (Mafia-dominated) Sicilian Separatists. The one obvious fact about the men who used him and threw him away is that their conception of an independent Sicily was very different from his, which was certainly closer to that of the organized peasants whose May Day meeting he massacred at the Portella della Ginestra in 1947.

Hobsbawm classifies Giuliano as a "social bandit", which he defines as "peasant outlaws whom the lord and state define as criminals, but who remain within peasant society, and are considered by their people as heroes, as champions, avengers, fighters for justice, perhaps even leaders of liberation, and in any case men to be admired, helped and supported." He further defines Giuliano as a member of the "noble robbers" subset of social bandits—Robin Hood being the prototype.

Central to Billy Jaynes Chandler's analysis is Giuliano's personality and psychology. The bandit definitely saw himself as a romantic, heroic figure. He mused about his epitaph: "Here lies Giuliano, hero of Sicily." He made photos of himself heroically astride a horse, labelled, "Robin Hood." He cultivated his image carefully, with an eye on history. He was, according to Chandler, audacious (turning the tables on the Carabinieri Christmas Eve, 1943), intelligent and astute (when negotiating with EVIS and, later, with Sicily's power brokers). At the same time, he was unsophisticated and naive—an inexperienced village boy negotiating with far more worldly men when he played politics. Compounding his naivete was his monumental ego and overly grand self-conception. Maria Lombardo shared his conception—she told Michael Stern that the three outstanding personages of history were Franklin Roosevelt, Winston Churchill, and her son, Giuliano. Eric Hobsbawm agrees with Chandler's assessment of the bandit, emphasizing the role of the MIS leaders in persuading Giuliano see himself as a major political player.

In the historical context, Chandler concurs with Hobsbawm's assessment of Giuliano as a "heroic robber". Giuliano can also be interpreted through the prism of Samuel L. Popkin's rational peasant concept, according to Chandler. The bandit's acquisitive urge coincides well with the rational peasant model, and he and his mother engaged in mafia-like rational acquisitiveness by demanding a fee from a bakery attempting to open a branch in Montelepre. But his "foolhardy, impulsive" killing of a police officer in 1943 was the polar opposite of careful calculation. The ordinary peasants who joined his armed actions in the moments of greatest need were more rational—willing to take significant risks from time to time for a better payday than they would ordinarily earn in the difficult years after the war. Mafiosi arising from the peasantry are even better examples of rationality: their entire lives are dedicated to material acquisition.

Giuliano wished to be pardoned for his crimes, and the only people who could possibly accommodate him were the power elite of Sicily (and Italy)—and so he did business with them. As Chandler says, this made him "above all else, an outlaw who accommodated himself to the existing structure of power." Hobsbawm again agrees with Chandler—with more emphasis on the politics and ideology of the situation.

Three residents of Montelepre during the years of Giuliano's banditry have added their commentary to the historical record.

At a sparsely attended Separatist commemorative ceremony in 1980, his sister Mariannina gave her view of his character: "He was good and honest. Turridu did what he did only from fear and out of poverty."

Padre diBella, Montelepre's parish priest, summed up the tumult of the bandit's life, and its effect on the village: "And all this for a few bags of flour!"

In spite of the hardship and misery experienced by the villagers during Giuliano's banditry, one of them—Saverio—remarked to Tomaso Besozzi, "What times those were, eh? When Giuliano was king of the mountain, and made the world tremble."

== Doubts about Giuliano's death ==
Over the years, doubts about Giuliano's death have been expressed. According to some, Giuliano fled from Sicily to Tunis and went on to live in the United States. The historian Giuseppe Casarrubea, son of one of the victims of Giuliano, compiled material to demonstrate that the body buried as Giuliano belonged to someone else. On 15 October 2010, the Public Prosecutor's Office in Palermo decided to exhume the body and compare its DNA with living relatives of Giuliano.

The DNA tests showed a 90% likelihood that the skeleton belongs to Giuliano. The DNA match between the skeleton and Giuliano's relations means that Sicilian prosecutors are now archiving the probe they opened in 2010 into the possibility that someone was murdered and passed off as Giuliano.

== Dramatizations ==
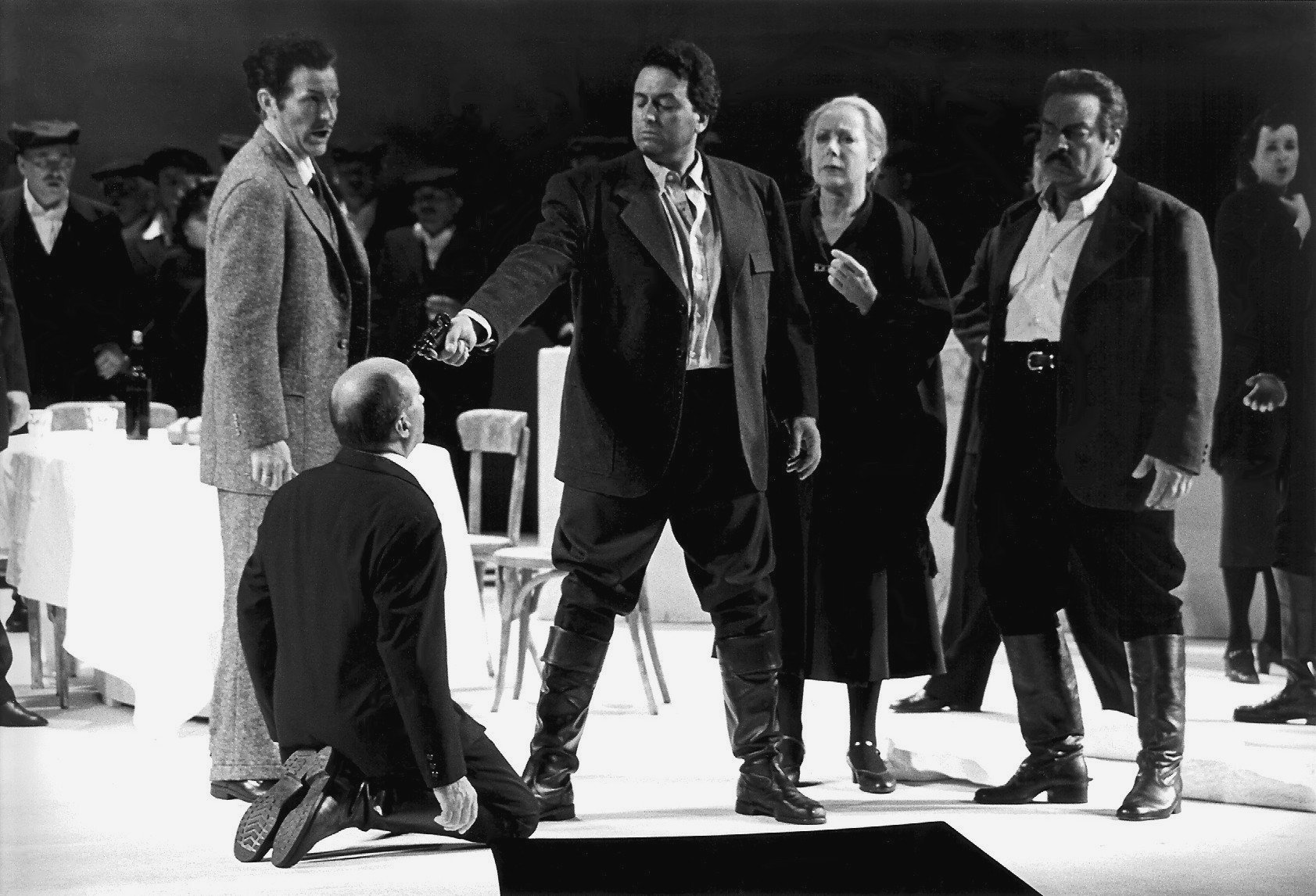
Scene from the opera Salvatore Giuliano by Lorenzo Ferrero, 1996.

His life inspired the novel The Brigand which was adapted for Australian radio by Morris West as Fire of Etna (1953).

The British author Gavin Maxwell researched his life for the book, God Protect Me from My Friends (1956).

A film of his life, Salvatore Giuliano, was directed by Francesco Rosi in 1961.

Novelist Mario Puzo published The Sicilian, a dramatized version of Giuliano's life, in 1984. The book provided the basis for the 1987 film by Michael Cimino which starred Christopher Lambert as Giuliano.

An opera, Salvatore Giuliano, was composed in 1985 by Italian composer Lorenzo Ferrero and premiered on 25 January 1986 at Teatro dell'Opera di Roma. The libretto outlines in short, graphic scenes the network of intrigue between Sicilian independence activists, Mafia and State that surrounds, and eventually destroys, the bandit hero.

== See also ==
- Sicilian Independence Movement
- Brigandage
