= The Sicilian (film) =

1987 film by Michael Cimino

- Theatrical release poster
- Directed by: Michael Cimino
- Screenplay by: Steve Shagan; Gore Vidal (uncredited); Michael Cimino (uncredited)
- Based on: The Sicilian by Mario Puzo
- Produced by: Michael Cimino; Joann Carelli; Bruce McNall (uncredited)
- Starring: Christopher Lambert; Terence Stamp; Joss Ackland; John Turturro; Richard Bauer
- Cinematography: Alex Thomson
- Edited by: Françoise Bonnot
- Music by: David Mansfield
- Production company: Gladden Entertainment
- Distributed by: 20th Century Fox (United States, Canada, United Kingdom and Ireland); De Laurentiis Entertainment Group (International)
- Release date: October 23, 1987
- Running time: 115 minutes 146 minutes (Director's cut)
- Country: United States
- Languages: English; Italian
- Budget: $16.5 million (Note: Estimate based on: "Total American gross at the box office was $5.5 million, about a third of our production costs." (3 × 5.5 = 16.5). McNall & D'Antonio, Pg. 115.) or "moderately more" than $8.5 million
- Box office: $5.4 million

The Sicilian is a 1987 epic historical crime film directed by Michael Cimino. It was adapted by Steve Shagan from Mario Puzo's 1984 novel of the same name, and later rewritten by Cimino and Gore Vidal, who deviated heavily from it. Resultantly, the film bears little to no resemblance to its source material. Christopher Lambert stars as Salvatore Giuliano, the infamous bandit who tried to liberate early 1950s Sicily from Italian rule and make it an American state.

In the film, Giuliano robs from the rich landowners to give to the peasants, who in turn hail him as their savior. As his popularity grows, so does his ego, and he eventually thinks he is above the power of his backer, Sicilian Mafia boss, Don Masino. The film also stars Terence Stamp, Joss Ackland, John Turturro and Barbara Sukowa.

== Plot ==
After the killing of Salvatore Giuliano, his godfather Professor Hector Adonis mourns his death—passing streets adorned with memorials and images of Giuliano—while on his way to visit Giuliano's cousin and closest advisor, Gaspare "Aspanu" Pisciotta, who is being held in a prison cell.

Three years earlier, Pisciotta assists Giuliano in an attempt to smuggle stolen grain to feed starving peasants in Montelepre. They are stopped by the Carabinieri, and in the ensuing gunfight Giuliano is severely wounded but kills a police sergeant; they are forced to hide in the mountains. Newly awakened after the near-death experience, Giuliano declares that he is "not leaving... yet" and becomes an outlaw. Though urged by Adonis to surrender, Giuliano is filled with romantic notions of liberating Sicily from Italian authority by helping the peasants buy food and reclaim uncultivated land owed to them, embracing this as his purpose.

Joined by Pisciotta, Giuliano frees prisoners from local police barracks—forming a ragtag band of guerillas which include a young boy. He promises them equal shares of their spoils in exchange for loyalty. Their first major success, an army train robbery, makes Giuliano famous, and he gains popular support by redistributing wealth to the poor.

Unbeknownst to Giuliano, Mafia boss Don Masino Croce secretly supports him, viewing him as a surrogate son. Croce, aligned with the Interior Minister of Italy, Franco Trezza, hopes to use Giuliano to influence an upcoming election against socialist candidate Silvio Ferra, the brother of Giuliano's lover Giovanna. As Giuliano's notoriety grows, he ruthlessly eliminates informants—attaching the warning to their bodies: "So die all who betray Giuliano."

Giuliano raids a noble gathering hosted by Camilla, an aristocrat from Hartford, Connecticut who is living as an expatriate in Sicily. Despite their class difference, she becomes enamored with Giuliano and seduces him; letting him have her emerald ring, which he never removes. The encounter inspires Giuliano to make Sicily become America's 49th state, and he asks her to send word to President Harry S. Truman proposing annexation.

Risking capture, Giuliano descends from the mountains to publicly propose to Giovanna in Palermo. He later kidnaps Prince Borsa—a wealthy Sicilian nobleman who is withholding acres of land legally owed to the peasants—for ransom, further escalating tensions with both the Mafia and the state.

Croce finally meets Giuliano and offers him a deal on Trezza's behalf: help secure the election victory for the Christian Democrats in exchange for a pardon. Though suspicious, Giuliano agrees to aid the campaign through intimidation and propaganda after Pisciotta confirms the arrangement through contacts in Palermo.

After Giuliano marries Giovanna, a socialist march led by her and Silvio is attacked by Giuliano's men. Though Giuliano had ordered only warning shots, the gunfire turns into a massacre, killing Silvio and many civilians, tarnishing Giuliano's image. He learns that one of his lieutenants acted on Croce's orders to ensure bloodshed and executes him. Realizing he has been manipulated and betrayed, Giuliano demands his promised reward—land for the Sicilian peasants—and resorts to desperate measures, including abducting a cardinal, but fails to force reform.

As military forces close in, Giuliano prepares to flee Sicily. He sends Giovanna—now bearing his child—ahead to America, promising to follow. Before escaping, he attempts to assassinate Croce but his gun malfunctions. Pisciotta ultimately betrays Giuliano to Croce, who offers leniency in exchange for killing Giuliano and instructs him to surrender afterward with the promise of a short prison sentence.

Giuliano bids goodbye to his protégé who tells him he will continue to fight for Giuliano's cause. Assuring that he would never really go away, he finally takes off the emerald ring and puts it on the boy's finger. On a sailboat, Pisciotta draws a gun on Giuliano, who calmly accepts his fate. After Pisciotta hesitates, Giuliano demands that he obey him, and Pisciotta resentfully shoots him.

In the aftermath, Adonis carries out one final deed to those "who betray Giuliano" by poisoning Pisciotta in his cell. Adonis and Croce—the two men who unknowingly led Giuliano to his demise—converse at his funeral. Croce asks Adonis what comes next, to which he replies that there is nothing; Giuliano was unique, a man who created himself, and with his death Sicily will revert to its old ways.

== Cast ==
- Christopher Lambert as Salvatore Giuliano
- Terence Stamp as Prince Borsa
- Joss Ackland as Don Masino Croce
- John Turturro as Gaspare "Aspanu" Pisciotta
- Barbara Sukowa as Camilla, Duchess of Crotone
- Richard Bauer as Hector Adonis
- Giulia Boschi as Giovanna Ferra
- Ray McAnally as Trezza
- Barry Miller as Dr. Nattore
- Andreas Katsulas as Passatempo
- Michael Wincott as Cpl. Silvestro Canio
- Ramon Bieri as Quintana
- Oliver Cotton as Cmdr. Roccofino
- Joe Regalbuto as Father Doldana
- Richard Venture as Cardinal of Palermo
- Aldo Ray as Don Siano of Bisacquino
- Derrick Branche as Terranova
- Justin Clark as boy

== Production ==
=== Development ===
Part of the reason for making this film lies in the connection to America; the desire for America, the dream of America, when one is outside of America. One of the characters is in fact an American aristocrat who has become a Sicilian aristocrat. And there is a young Sicilian boy who harbors a dream of America. He says it at one point: "There are more Sicilians in New York and Chicago than there are here."

— Michael Cimino

Due to the huge success of The Godfather, Mario Puzo was given $1 million for the film rights to his novel The Sicilian. David Begelman, head of Gladden Entertainment at the time, hired Michael Cimino to direct. The original novel features Michael Corleone as a character but contractually he was not allowed to appear in the film of The Sicilian. Cimino's fee was a reported $2.5 million of the $8.5 million budget.

When producer Bruce McNall met with Cimino at a dinner in Los Angeles, he complained loudly about the script and Begelman's interference with casting. Cimino wanted Daniel Day-Lewis to play Salvatore Giuliano after seeing him in The Bounty, but eventually settled on Christopher Lambert instead, after he was told by the producers that Day-Lewis was not well known enough in the film industry for a lead role. Cimino would later express his regret over the casting of Lambert: "He did everything he could; he cried, got hurt, but he couldn't do it." Begelman was concerned about a French actor starring in a film about an Italian hero in an English-speaking film, but decided to give Cimino what he wanted with regards to the script and casting to move forward.

Following two unsatisfactory meetings with Steve Shagan about his script, Cimino heavily rewrote it, enlisting the help and collaboration of novelist Gore Vidal in the process. Shagan later said Cimino "chose not to make the movie I wrote. The guy had his own ideas."

Vidal said that Cimino came to his house in Italy in March 1986 with a script that he had personally written. "I didn't recognize much of what was on the screen," Shagan later said. Ironically, it was Vidal who ended up filing suit against both Shagan and the Writers Guild of America to receive screenplay credit. "I was defrauded of my work," he told the Los Angeles Times. Vidal eventually won the suit against WGA. In the DVD commentary of Year of the Dragon, Cimino said he learned a lot from working with Vidal.

=== Shooting ===
The film was shot on location in Sicily in the spring and summer of 1986. In late April 1986, Begelman and McNall discovered that the film was over budget and behind schedule. The problems involved mostly hang-ups with personnel and equipment— nothing on the scale of Cimino's Heaven's Gate. One exception was some low-level Mafia men who controlled certain locations and union workers. Cimino suggested that Begelman and McNall meet with the Mafia men to overcome the impasse. Upon meeting them in a restaurant off the main piazza, the producers discovered that the Mafia men wanted to appear in the film. "Once we all understood," wrote McNall, "the fix was easy. There were plenty of little roles for walk-ons and extras. And if a real role didn't exist, we could pretend to involve some of the guys and throw them a day's pay." Once the problem was solved, Cimino had access to the countryside and the local labor pool.

In order to prepare them for their roles, Christopher Lambert recalled that prior to filming, Cimino had him and John Turturro spend an entire two and a half months riding on horseback in Sicily. Lambert spoke of his relationship with Cimino in 2015:

"Cimino was probably the greatest of his generation, including [Francis Ford] Coppola and [Martin] Scorsese, but he was too smart. He had too much talent. He is an architect, a painter, a writer and a director. On set, he was better than everyone else, in every way. So he wanted to oversee everything. And that is impossible. You have to know how to delegate. He didn't know. This resulted in acute paranoia, in mind-blowing methods of manipulation. One day, just before a very difficult scene, he said to me: 'I had the producers on the phone, I'm fired tomorrow.' I still don't know if it was a manifestation of his paranoia, or a way of throwing me off balance. Because the next day, he was there."

Filming finished only "moderately more" than its original budget. "This wasn't a runaway production" said one source at the time.

=== Post-production ===
After location work was finished, Cimino took the footage straight to his editing room to begin cutting. Cimino did not report any of his progress on the editing. In May 1987, after six-months of editing, Cimino had a 143-minute version that he was very happy with. However, he had final cut only up to 120 minutes. He knew there would be problems if he showed Begelman only the long version, so he asked his editor, Lizi Gelber, to prepare a short one as well. He told her to simply cut out all the action sequences — which were spectacular and showed where the money had gone — and string together all the remaining dialogue sequences so the movie would be 120 minutes of talk. A lavish wedding scene that was supposed to be interrupted by a violent attack cut directly to a hospital, where guests were being treated for injuries suffered at an attack that had not occurred on-screen. Begelman was reportedly outraged by the quality of the 120-minute cut: he considered it to be a "bad joke." The problem was that the final-cut provision in a director's contract is inalienable — the producer has no legal right to change what is delivered. Cimino was essentially saying: accept the longer cut or you have to release the short version.

However, what Cimino did count on was Begelman not only knew how to play just as dirty, but even dirtier — the executive producer set aside their contract with Cimino when he went behind his back and asked another filmmaker (and friend) if he would assist with re-cutting the picture (down to the requisite 120 minutes total running time).

== Lawsuit ==
When Michael Cimino got wind of Gladden Entertainment's new cut of The Sicilian, he demanded an arbitration hearing with the Directors Guild of America. "The judge in the arbitration acknowledged the film's approaching release date by giving us a speedy hearing," according to Bruce McNall. Bert Fields represented the producers. Cimino's lawyers used a precedent established by Fields in an earlier case: Fields aided Warren Beatty's win in a dispute over final cut with the producers of the movie Reds, a finding that stated a contract granting a director final cut was absolutely binding. The month-long Directors Guild arbitration hearing looked as if it would go Cimino's way — the Guild were never sympathetic to any weakening of their members' power. However, Cimino had made a fatal error on which the case eventually turned: it was proved that he had neither been involved in nor even seen the 120-minute version that purported to be his "final cut." He had simply given Lizi Gelber instructions (leaving it up to her how it could be assembled).

Bert Fields argued that there should be an obligation for a director to prepare his final cut "in good faith," and the arbitrator agreed: "[Cimino's] inattention is a far cry from the attention, care and review that ... directors normally accord to the versions they submit as their final cuts." Cimino made another error during initial contract negotiations with Gladden; Dino De Laurentiis was called in to testify as an expert witness. De Laurentiis had overseen Cimino's Year of the Dragon, set the precedent for giving Cimino final cut in the contract for that film and even gave Cimino a positive recommendation to Begelman for The Sicilian. However, when De Laurentiis took the stand:

"Final cut? I no give-a him final cut," he declared.

"But we've seen the contract," said Fields.

"Have you seen the side letter?" asked De Laurentiis.

A subsequently unearthed side letter stated that notwithstanding the contract, Cimino did not have the right to final cut on Year of the Dragon. Fields argued that by withholding the side letter, Cimino defrauded the producers. The judge agreed, Cimino lost the case. With the assistance of industry friend and director, Stanley Donen, David Begelman oversaw the film's running time cut down 115 minutes.

== Release ==
Fox released The Sicilian on October 23, 1987, in 370 theaters. The film opened at #7 on the box office charts, grossing $1,720,351 and averaging $4,649 per theater. The film's domestic box office gross eventually totaled $5,406,879.

The Los Angeles Times reported the film "is sinking faster than a body dumped in the Strait of Messina" noting the movie opened strongly but "Once paying customers got a whiff of this thing... it was all over."

According to McNall, the losses on The Sicilian were offset by the profits from Gladden's other 1987 release Mannequin, which unlike The Sicilian, became a box office hit.

== Reception ==
Critical reaction to the film was fairly negative. Many critics panned the film's incoherent narrative, muddy visual style, and the casting of Lambert in the lead as Giuliano. Gene Siskel and Roger Ebert gave The Sicilian "two thumbs down". Ebert complained about the cinematography: "The film alternates between scenes that are backlit where you can't see the faces and other scenes that were so murky that you couldn't see who was talking." Siskel attacked the film's star, "Let me just go after Christopher Lambert... because here is the center of the film. This would be as if the Al Pacino character in The Godfather were played by a member of the walking dead." In his Chicago Sun-Times review, Ebert claimed The Sicilian continues director Michael Cimino's "record of making an incomprehensible mess out of every other film he directs", contrasting the "power and efficiency" of The Deer Hunter and The Year of the Dragon with the "half-visible meditations on backlighting" of Heaven's Gate and The Sicilian.

Vincent Canby of The New York Times said, "Cimino's fondness for amber lighting and great, sweeping camera movements are evident from time to time, but the film is mostly a garbled synopsis of the Puzo novel." Variety added "Cimino seems to be aiming for an operatic telling of the short career of the violent 20th-century folk hero [based on Mario Puzo's novel], but falls into an uncomfortable middle ground between European artfulness and stock Hollywood conventions." Hal Hinson of The Washington Post felt it was "unambiguously atrocious, but in that very special, howlingly grandiose manner that only a filmmaker with visions of epic greatness working on a large scale with a multinational cast can achieve." Leonard Maltin rated the film a "BOMB", calling it a "militantly lugubrious bio of Salvatore Giuliano".

Producer McNall was personally disappointed by the film. "Given that The Sicilian was a descendant of Puzo's The Godfather," wrote McNall, "I had expected something with the same beauty, drama, and emotion. Cimino had shown with The Deer Hunter that he was capable of making such a movie. But he had failed." McNall even quoted Ebert's review in his appraisal of The Sicilian, "Ebert criticized the cast, the cinematography, the script, even the sound quality. He was right about all of it."

== Legacy ==
[Salvatore] Giuliano was a very young, very handsome guy with completely crazy ideas. He had his picture on the cover of Life magazine when he was barely twenty. Around the same age, Michael Collins had been sent to London by the Irish Provisional Government to negotiate the partition of Ireland. I always tried to keep in mind that these guys were young; therefore impulsive, idealistic, and wholehearted. Audiences are used to seeing fifty-year-olds playing soldiers. But these soldiers are eighteen. I know that The Sicilian isn't a flawless film. But we at least tried to avoid the clichés everyone has about Sicilian society. I spent over a year in Sicily living among the people I portray in my film. People were expecting a predictable portrait of Italy, reinforcing the well-known stereotypes. Sicily had always been shown as an uninteresting place [before].

— Michael Cimino

A 146-minute director's cut was released theatrically in France and is available on VHS, DVD and Blu-Ray in the United States, and in Europe as a region 2 DVD. This version received mixed reviews when it initially opened in Paris. Maltin gave the director's cut of The Sicilian two stars out of four, writing that the film "seems shorter, thanks to more coherency and Sukowa's strengthened role. Neither version, though, can overcome two chief liabilities: Cimino's missing sense of humor and Lambert's laughably stone-faced performance."

Film critic F.X. Feeney, a close friend of Cimino's, lauded this version of the film, and in an article of L.A. Weekly, he compared and contrasted the two particular versions. He mentioned that Fox's cut removed "three major sequences, four major scenes, and about 100 lines of dialogue," stated that Lambert's performance was botched by the studio's tinkering, and that Sukowa's voice was dubbed by another actress in said version. Feeney went on to call The Sicilian "a masterpiece" and "a work of genius," and declared it as the best film of 1987.

Gore Vidal called the original cut "a lovely movie. There are things wrong with it, but there are things wrong with every movie. It was never meant to be realistic. It was meant to be a fairy tale, a fantasy about Giuliano ... We decided to leave the realism to the Italians. It's their country, their character. We wanted to do something legendary." Vic Armstrong, who did stunts for the film, wrote in his memoir My Life as Indiana Jones, James Bond, Superman and Other Action Heroes: The True Adventures of the World's Greatest Stuntman, "I don't know quite what happened, because it was one of the greatest scripts ever and yet the end result was horrible."

Revisiting The Sicilian at the time of Cimino's death, Richard Brody of The New Yorker wrote:

"Cimino doesn't stint on the Western analogies, with horses and mountains and conflicts over land rights, and his image repertory is as vital and energetic as ever, but it's hard not to see a crisis of cinematic faith, a sense of narrowing possibilities, afflicting the film. The pageantry of a Communist march with red flags in the wilderness, the ancient clutter of a nobleman's study, the haunting mystery of streetlights through a car's rear window all ring with Cimino's enthusiastic inspiration, but the movie seems like a substitute for the director's visions at his most uninhibited. It plays mostly like a feature-length analogy, a sort of intellectual behind-the-scenes laboratory for another vast American movie that he couldn't have made at the time."

== See also ==
- Salvatore Giuliano, a 1962 Italian film directed by Francesco Rosi.
- Salvatore Giuliano, a 1986 Italian opera by Lorenzo Ferrero
