= Edward Falco =

American author

Edward Falco is an American author, playwright, electronic literature writer, and new media editor.

== Works and publications ==
=== Hypertexts and electronic literature ===
An early innovator in the field of digital writing, Falco's literary and experimental hypertexts are taught in universities internationally. His online work includes Self-Portrait as Child w/Father (Iowa Review Web), Circa 1967–1968 (Eastgate Reading Room), and "Charmin' Cleary" (Eastgate Reading Room). Falco's work also appears in the online journal Blackbird. Falco published two works with Eastgate, a hypertext poetry collection, Sea Island (1995) and hypertext novel, A Dream with Demons (1997), Astrid Ensslin describes Falco's short essay, "Arriving at the Hypertext Poem" in the Eastgate Quarterly as an "essay to explore the nonlinear affordances of the medium."

He has edited and overseen The New River, an online publication of electronic literature (new media writing).

=== Novels and short stories ===
His latest book is the poetry Collection, X in the Tickseed (LSU, 2024). His previous books include the novel, Transcendent Gardening (C&R Press, 2022), the poetry collection Wolf Moon Blood Moon (LSU, 2017), and the crime novels Toughs (Unbridled Books, 2014) and The Family Corleone (Grand Central, 2012). Toughs follows the lives of fictional characters and their relationship to the notorious criminal Vince "Mad Dog" Coll, as well as Lucky Luciano, Owney Madden, Dutch Shultz, and other gangland figures. The Family Corleone (2012), based on a screenplay by Mario Puzo, spent several weeks on The New York Times Best Seller and Extended Best Seller lists, and has been published around the world in twenty-one foreign editions. Other novels include Saint John of the Five Boroughs (2009) and Wolf Point (2006). His short story collection Sabbath Night in the Church of the Piranha: New and Selected Stories was released in 2005. Falco's In the Park of Culture, a collection of short fictions, was released the same year.

In addition to the works mentioned above, Falco's earlier books include the novel Winter in Florida (1990) and a chapbook of prose poems, Concert in the Park of Culture (1985), as well as two collections of short stories: Acid (1996) and Plato at Scratch Daniel's & Other Stories (1990).

His stories have been published widely in journals, including The Atlantic Monthly, Playboy, and TriQuarterly, and collected in the Best American Short Stories, the Pushcart Prize, and several anthologies, including, Blue Cathedral: Short Fiction for the New Millennium.

=== Plays ===
As a playwright, Falco is the author of Home Delivery, which won the Hampden-Sydney Playwriting Award and was subsequently staged by the Hampden-Sydney Theater Department. Earlier versions of the play were given staged readings in Mill Mountain Theater's Centerpiece and Theater B reading series. Two plays, Sabbath Night in the Church of the Piranha and Radon, premiered in university productions at Virginia Tech. Both were directed by David Johnson. In the summer of 2001, Falco worked with artists and actors from the United States, England, Greece, Bosnia, and Germany in an international theatre project meant to explore the healing power of drama. Scenes from The Cretans, a play developed during the project, were presented for a small audience in an amphitheatre on the Aegean in the village of Kolympari, Crete. His most recent plays are The Miscreant and Possum Dreams; the latter received its world premiere at Akron, Ohio's None Too Fragile Theatre's June 13–28, 2014

== Prizes and awards ==
Acid won the 1995 Richard Sullivan Prize from the University of Notre Dame and was a finalist for The Patterson Prize. He has won a number of other prizes and awards for his fiction, including the Robert Penn Warren Prize from the Southern Review, the Emily Clark Balch Prize for Short Fiction from The Virginia Quarterly Review, The Mishima Prize for Innovative Fiction from The Saint Andrews Review, a Dakin Fellowship from the Sewanee Writers' Conference, two Individual Artist's Fellowships from the Virginia Commission for the Arts, and The Governor's Award for the Screenplay from The Virginia Festival of American Film.

== Miscellaneous ==
Falco lives in Blacksburg, Virginia, where he teaches writing and literature in Virginia Tech's MFA program and edits The New River, an online journal of digital writing. He is the uncle of Edie Falco, an American actress known for her role of Carmela Soprano on the HBO drama series The Sopranos.

== Bibliography ==
- Concert in the Park of Culture (1985)
- Winter in Florida (1990)
- Plato at Scratch Daniel's & Other Stories (1990)
- Sea Island (1995)
- Acid (1996)
- A Dream with Demons (1997)
- Sabbath Night in the Church of the Piranha: New and Selected Stories (2005)
- In the Park of Culture (2005)
- Wolf Point (2006)
- Saint John of the Five Boroughs (2009)
- Burning Man (2011)
- The Family Corleone (2012)
- Toughs (2014)
- Wolf Moon Blood Moon (2017)
- Transcendent Gardening (2022)
