= The Sicilian =

1984 novel by Mario Puzo

- U.S. first edition cover
- Author: Mario Puzo
- Language: English
- Series: The Godfather
- Genre: Thriller, crime fiction
- Publisher: Random House
- Publication date: November 1984
- Publication place: United States
- Media type: Print (hardback and paperback), Audiobook
- Pages: 416 pp. (hardback edition) and 410 pp. (paperback edition)
- ISBN: 0-671-43564-7 (hardback edition) and ISBN 0-345-44170-2 (paperback edition)
- OCLC: 11030814
- Dewey Decimal: 813/.54 19
- LC Class: PS3566.U9 S5 1984
- Preceded by: The Godfather

The Sicilian is a novel by American author Mario Puzo. Published in 1984 by Random House Publishing Group (ISBN 0-671-43564-7), it is based on the life of Sicilian bandit Salvatore Giuliano. The plot is connected with Puzo's most famous work, The Godfather (1969), and contains characters from The Godfather. It is regarded as The Godfather's literary sequel and is the second book in The Godfather novel series. It was adapted into a film in 1987, though all Godfather references were removed for copyright reasons in the film adaptation.

In this novel, the spelling of Salvatore Giuliano's name was intentionally changed by Puzo to "Guiliano". This novel, though a work of fiction, is based on the real-life exploits of Giuliano.

== Plot ==
In 1950, Michael Corleone, the son of Sicilian-American Mafia Don Vito Corleone, is preparing to return home to America after his exile in Sicily. He meets with Don Croce Malo, the most powerful Sicilian Mafia boss. Don Croce and Michael's father have allied to help the famous bandit Salvatore "Turi" Giuliano escape Sicily and go with Michael to America. Michael learns of a set of documents Giuliano has that would cause the downfall of the current Italian government, to be released upon Giuliano's death or capture, called the Testament. Michael also meets Giuliano's parents and Gaspare "Aspanu" Pisciotta, Giuliano's best friend and second in command.

In 1943, Turi Giuliano and Aspanu Pisciotta are stopped by the Carabinieri, the corrupt Italian police, while smuggling food, but they refuse to give up the food or the name of who they were trading with. Giuliano is shot, but he manages to kill his attacker, a police Sergeant. Turi is carried by Aspanu to a local monastery, where he recovers from his wounds and learns more about the criminal side of Sicily under the care of the Abbot Manfredi. After he recovers, he and Aspanu make their way back to Giuliano's home in Montelepre, where he is still being sought for the murder. While discussing his future with family and friends, the local police attempt to arrest Turi. Turi and Aspanu open fire on the trucks pursuing them and kill some policemen. They flee to the mountains. Innocent citizens of Montelepre are arrested in retaliation.

Turi and Aspanu are met by Turi's godfather, Hector Adonis, who fails to dissuade them from becoming bandits. Turi and Aspanu decide to free the prisoners and break into the local police barracks where they are being held. Turi narrowly escapes death at the hands of the Corporal Canio Silvestro whose pistol fails when he pulls the trigger at Turi's head. The freed prisoners include local bandits Passatempo and Terranova, who join Turi's band. Giuliano begins to become famous throughout Italy after a high-profile robbery, and he becomes a hero in Sicily, as he gives away much of his band's earnings to the poor. Silvestro, disgraced after being spared by Giuliano, asks to join his band. They test his loyalty by asking him to execute Frisella, a barber who informed on Giuliano. Silvestro does so and they attach a note to his body saying "So die all who betray Giuliano".

Giuliano comes to dominate the entire northwest corner of Sicily. Giuliano orchestrates a kidnapping of a Sicilian nobleman, Prince Ollorto. Ollorto's ransom is arranged by Don Croce, who Ollorto had been paying protection money to. The kidnapping causes Giuliano to come into direct conflict with Don Croce and the Mafia for the first time. Don Croce allows Giuliano to be assassinated by the other Dons, but Giuliano manages to avoid them all. Don Croce finally sends assassin Stefan Andolini, a cousin of Don Corleone's, whose life is only spared by Giuliano due to the intervention of the Abbot Manfredi, his father. Andolini joins Giuliano's band and acts as an emissary between Giuliano and Don Croce.

In 1950 Trapani, Michael Corleone is joined by Peter Clemenza, a capo of Don Corleone's, who is helping with the escape. Michael meets Justina, Turi's pregnant wife, and Hector Adonis. She leaves for America. Adonis informs Michael that the Testament is hidden in a gift Giuliano's mother gave him and Michael sends it to his father in America.

In 1947, Don Croce is aligned with the ruling Christian Democratic party, mostly to deny power to the Socialist parties that he believes could destroy the Mafia. Don Croce, along with Italy's Minister of Justice Franco Trezza, draw up plans to mount an offensive against Giuliano, but instead give foreknowledge of the plans to Giuliano in return for his help in swinging the upcoming election for the Christian Democrats. Giuliano accepts these terms, along with a promise of a pardon, and helps the campaign using propaganda and intimidation.

A Socialist parade celebrating recent victories over the Christian Democrats takes place in the towns of Piani dei Greci and San Giuseppe Jato and converge at a plain called the Portella della Ginestra. Giuliano agreed to suppress the parade, giving his two chiefs, Passatempo and Terranova, orders to "shoot over their heads" to get the crowds to disperse. The men end up shooting too low, and massacre many people, including women and children. The massacre proves devastating for Giuliano's image in Sicily and destroys any hope of a pardon. Giuliano discovers that Passatempo had been paid off by Don Croce to shoot the paraders and Giuliano executes him. He also executes six Mafia chiefs who were defending the estate of Prince Ollorto from land claims by the local peasants.

A large force in Sicily assembles under the command of Colonel Luca to take down Giuliano. Giuliano's parents and many citizens of Montelepre are arrested for conspiring with him. In retaliation, Giuliano robs a heavily guarded truck that held the money for paying the Carabinieri. Colonel Luca then calls for the rest of the reserve force to come in. Giuliano's band is falling apart, with Silvestro escaping to England and Andolini and Terranova being killed by police. With Colonel Luca's forces closing in and Don Croce having betrayed him, Giuliano knows he must leave for America or die in Sicily.

Aspanu Pisciotta meets with Michael and tells him where to meet Giuliano. The next day, Clemenza and Michael are heading to the meeting place when they hear that Giuliano has been killed by the Carabinieri. They are arrested by Inspector Velardi, but are released soon after due to the intervention of Don Croce. Michael and Clemenza find out that, having grown increasingly paranoid and resentful of Giuliano, Pisciotta has betrayed Giuliano to Don Croce. Pisciotta had shot and killed Giuliano in a moment of panic, fearing that Giuliano knew of his betrayal. Later, imprisoned for banditry, Pisciotta is poisoned by Hector Adonis with the help of Don Croce. Adonis leaves a note in Pisciotta's pocket reading, "So die all who betray Giuliano". With Giuliano dead, Don Croce and the Mafia enrich themselves more than ever at the expense of the people of Sicily.

Michael returns home to Long Island. Don Corleone tells him that they will not release Giuliano's Testament, under the deal he made with Don Croce to ensure Michael's safety. Michael, shocked, realizes that he had been unknowingly working against Giuliano, and that giving the Testament to his father had allowed Giuliano to be killed. Don Corleone teaches Michael a rather dubious lesson: it is better to remain alive at whatever costs than to be a dead hero.

== Characters ==
The principal characters that drive the plot of the story, many of whom are based on real-life figures.

- Salvatore "Turi" Giuliano – A legendary bandit. Conceived in America and born in the small Sicilian village of Montelepre, Salvatore Guiliano is a tall and handsome young man living a relatively normal life for the first twenty years of his life, known as a gentle man and loved dearly by his friends, family and the inhabitants of his tiny village. However, while smuggling food and drink to prepare for the wedding of his sister, Guiliano and his childhood friend, Aspanu Pisciotta, are accosted by the corrupt Italian police, the Carabinieri, and after being shot by a sergeant, Guiliano kills the sergeant with a single shot from his pistol. Helped by Pisciotta, the severely injured Guiliano is taken to the nearby monastery, where the primary priest, the Abbot Manfriedi, shields him from the Carabinieri, and is soon healed back to full health by a doctor and the priests of the monastery. After leaving the monastery, Guiliano dedicates his life to being a bandit, and creates a band, living the next few years forming a legendary reputation all over Italy for his daring exploits in stealing from the rich and wealthy and in giving almost all of his earnings to the poor and underprivileged peasants of Sicily, who honor him as their hero. As his reputation and exploits increase, he is hunted both by the Italian government, who form a special taskforce to capture him, and the Mafia, headed by the capo dei capi, Don Croce Malo, whose interests and influence have been damaged by Guiliano and his band. He is betrayed and killed by his best friend Aspanu Pisciotta before he can escape to America with Michael Corleone.
  Aspanu Pisciotta (left) and Salvatore Giuliano in real life
- Gaspare "Aspanu" Pisciotta – The childhood best friend and cousin of Salvatore Guiliano. A sly, thin and handsome young man, who suffers from tuberculosis, Aspanu Pisciotta was the closest and most trusted friend of Turi Guiliano, who trusted him with his life. As Guiliano's fame and reputation increases, Pisciotta gradually feels less and less significant and after much of his advice is ignored by Guiliano, Pisciotta is approached by Don Croce, who convinces him to betray Guiliano.
- Michael Corleone – The American son of the famed Don Vito Corleone and heir to the Corleone family. Michael has spent four years in Sicily to avoid prosecution for his murder of a high-ranking New York City police officer. After the murders of his wife Apollonia and his brother Sonny, he is eager to return home to his family in New York. However, he is ordered by his father to escort famous bandit Turi Guiliano back to America with him. As he learns more about the reputation and exploits of the legendary Guiliano, Michael becomes intrigued by him and looks forward to their meeting, but Guiliano is killed before the meeting can take place.
- Don Croce Malo – The extremely powerful capo dei capi who wields power not only in the entire island of Sicily but also in Rome and with the Italian government and the ruling Christian Democratic party. A legendary negotiator, Don Croce quickly rises to the head of the Mafia and early into Turi Guiliano's career, is eager to make Guiliano the heir to his Mafia empire, but is unable to do so due to Guiliano's deep hatred of the Mafia. As Guiliano's daring exploits increase and after Guiliano assassinates six prominent Mafia leaders and severely damages his interests, Don Croce decides to kill Guiliano, making a deal with Don Corleone to have the Testament kept from the public in exchange for the safety of his son Michael. After Guiliano's death, he and the Mafia are once again the undisputed rulers of Sicily, enriching themselves at the expense of the people. His character is believed to be based on real life Sicilian Mafia boss Calogero Vizzini.
- Hector Adonis – Professor of literature and history in the University of Palermo and godfather to Turi Guiliano. A diminutive man, Adonis is an elegantly dressed and extremely intelligent academic, who commands also influence among the Mafia. He loves and cares for his godson Guiliano, whom he taught literature in his childhood and for whom he often brought many books to read while visiting him.
- Stefan Andolini – An assassin and bandit who works for Don Croce, then for Turi Guiliano. He is a cousin of Vito Corleone (born Vito Andolini), who he works for in America for some years. He is ordered by Don Croce to join Guiliano's band and assassinate him when the opportunity strikes, but he and his men are found out. His men are killed but he is spared after the intercession of the Abbot Manfredi, who is secretly Andolini's father. He joins Guiliano's band for real and acts as an intermediary between Guiliano and Don Croce. He is killed shortly before Guiliano by Inspector Frederico Velardi.
- Passatempo – A member of Salvatore Guiliano's band. A dangerous individual even as a youth, he killed the uncle who gave him his first donkey and turned to banditry along with his companion Terranova. The two were eventually captured and held in the Bellampo barracks, where they were rescued by Guiliano and Pisciotta, later joining their band. Unlike Terranova, he was unnecessarily cruel and lacking in principles, valuing money over all else. He is eventually executed by Guiliano after he takes money from Don Croce to intentionally fire on the crowd in Portella della Ginestra massacre.
- Terranova – A bandit and a member of Salvatore Guiliano's band. Once a hard-working farmer, he had turned to banditry when two tax collectors attempted to seize his prized pig. He was captured and placed in the Bellampo barracks alongside fellow bandit, Passatempo. Both were rescued by Guiliano and Pisciotta and they joined the band. Terranova was trusted with several important tasks such as escorting Guiliano's father and guarding VIP hostages. He also directly handled the band's other kidnapping for ransom plots. Though his fellow lieutenants Gaspare Pisciotta and Passatempo betrayed Guiliano, Terranova remained loyal. He was involved in the Portella della Ginestra massacre, but it was determined by Giuliano that he is not part of the massacre, unlike Passatempo, who had been paid by Don Croce Malo, to deliberately fire at the crowd. Terranova was a somewhat sentimental person with a desire for love. He had a mistress, a widow with children, who he provided for. Terranova was shot to death by the authorities after visiting her in Palermo.

== Film adaptation ==
In 1987, The Sicilian was adapted into a film, directed by Michael Cimino and starring Christopher Lambert as Salvatore Guiliano. Due to rights issues, all Godfather references were removed and the characters of Michael Corleone and Peter Clemenza were not included in the film adaptation.

== See also ==
- Salvatore Giuliano, a 1962 Italian film directed by Francesco Rosi
- Salvatore Giuliano, a 1986 Italian opera by Lorenzo Ferrero
