= List of The Godfather characters =

This is a list of characters from the film series The Godfather, consisting of The Godfather (1972), The Godfather Part II (1974) and The Godfather Part III (1990), based on Mario Puzo's best-selling 1969 novel of the same name, as well as the book series The Godfather consisting of the original, Puzo's The Sicilian (1984), Mark Winegardner's The Godfather Returns (2004) and The Godfather's Revenge (2006), and Edward Falco's prequel novel The Family Corleone (2012). There are also three video games set within The Godfather universe: The Godfather (1991), The Godfather (2006) and The Godfather II (2009).

== Corleone family ==
Corleone family tree

=== Vito Corleone ===
Vito Andolini Corleone is the patriarch of the Corleone family, as well as leader of the Corleone crime family. He appears in Mario Puzo's novel The Godfather and in the first two films of the trilogy. He is portrayed by Marlon Brando in The Godfather and as a young man by Robert De Niro in The Godfather Part II. Brando and De Niro both winning Oscars for their performances marked the first time two separate actors won Oscars for portraying the same character.

=== Carmela Corleone ===
Carmela "Mama" Corleone is the wife of Vito Corleone and the mother of Sonny, Fredo, Michael and Connie Corleone, and the adoptive mother of Tom Hagen. She appears in Mario Puzo's The Godfather, as well as its first two film adaptations, where she is portrayed by Morgana King.

=== Santino "Sonny" Corleone ===
Santino "Sonny" Corleone is the oldest son of the Vito and Carmela Corleone. He has two brothers, Fredo and Michael, and a sister, Connie. Sonny's hot-tempered nature eventually leads to his early death.

Sonny appears in Mario Puzo's 1969 novel The Godfather and its 1972 film adaptation. In the film, Sonny was portrayed by James Caan, who reprised his role for a flashback scene in The Godfather Part II. Roman Coppola played Sonny as a boy in the 1920s scenes of The Godfather Part II.

=== Fredo Corleone ===
Frederico "Fredo" Corleone is the second born son of Vito and Carmela Corleone, but is passed over when his younger brother Michael succeeds their father as head of the family due to Fredo's incompetence. He appears in Mario Puzo's 1969 novel The Godfather and its 1972 film adaptation, as well as its 1974 sequel, where he is portrayed by John Cazale. In The Godfather Part II, betrayal of his family eventually leads to Michael having him killed.

=== Michael Corleone ===
Michael Corleone is the protagonist of Mario Puzo's novel The Godfather and Francis Ford Coppola's film trilogy based on the novel. He is the third son of Vito and Carmela Corleone. He is portrayed by Al Pacino in the films. His journey from family outsider to ruthless Mafia boss and eventual redemption is the central focus of the novel and the films.

=== Connie Corleone ===
Constanzia "Connie" Corleone is the only daughter and youngest child of Vito and Carmela Corleone. She appears in Mario Puzo's novel The Godfather and Francis Ford Coppola's film trilogy, where she is portrayed by Talia Shire. The first film and novel begins with her marriage to her abusive husband, Carlo Rizzi. After her husband's murder is arranged by her brother, Michael, she becomes estranged from her family. The death of her mother Carmela prompts her to become closer to her family. She eventually becomes one of Michael's closest allies.

=== Tom Hagen ===
Thomas "Tom" Hagen is a consigliere and lawyer for the Corleone crime family. He is also an informally adopted member of the Corleone family. Hagen appears in Mario Puzo's novel The Godfather and Francis Ford Coppola's films The Godfather and The Godfather Part II. He is portrayed by Robert Duvall in the films.

=== Sandra Corleone ===
Sandrinella "Sandra" Corleone (née Colombo) is the wife of Sonny Corleone. Sandra and Sonny bore four children. Two boys and a set of twin girls. She appears in Mario Puzo's novel The Godfather and its first film adaptation, where she was portrayed by Julie Gregg. In the early drafts of The Godfather Part II, it is revealed that Sandra is Tom Hagen's mistress indirectly mentioned by Michael. Neither her fate nor those of her four children are mentioned in the second sequel, The Godfather, Part III.

=== Vincent Corleone ===
Vincent Santino "Vinnie" Mancini is the illegitimate son of Sonny Corleone and Lucy Mancini. He succeeds his uncle Michael Corleone as head of the Corleone crime family using the title Don Vincent Corleone. He appears in The Godfather Part III, portrayed by Andy García.

=== Anthony Corleone ===
Anthony "Tony" Corleone is the son of Michael Corleone and Kay Adams Corleone. While he is the son of a Mafia boss, he does not join the family business and becomes an opera singer in The Godfather Part III. Anthony appears in Mario Puzo's novel The Godfather and Francis Ford Coppola's film trilogy, portrayed by Franc D'Ambrosio in the third film.

=== Mary Corleone ===
Mary Corleone is the daughter of Michael Corleone and Kay Adams Corleone. She is a childish and naive girl. Mary attempts to begin a relationship with her cousin, Vincent Corleone. Her murder at the end of The Godfather Part III devastates her father Michael. She appears in Francis Ford Coppola's film trilogy The Godfather portrayed by Sofia Coppola.

=== Kay Adams / Kay Corleone ===
Katherine "Kay" Corleone (née Adams) is the second wife of Michael Corleone and the mother of Anthony and Mary Corleone. She has an abortion while pregnant with the couple's prospective second son. Kay appears in Mario Puzo's novel The Godfather and Francis Ford Coppola's film trilogy, portrayed by Diane Keaton. In contrast to most of the characters in the novel and films, Kay Adams is from a well-to-do White Anglo-Saxon Protestant family.

=== Apollonia Vitelli / Apollonia Corleone ===
Apollonia Corleone (née Vitelli) is the first wife of Michael Corleone. She appears in Mario Puzo's novel The Godfather and in the film adaptation of the same name, where she is portrayed by Simonetta Stefanelli. She also appears in flashbacks in The Godfather Part III.

Apollonia is a young Sicilian woman of Greek descent born in 1931 who meets Michael Corleone during his exile in Sicily. After seeing her for the first time, Michael and his bodyguards inquire about her to Signore Vitelli, a local tavern keeper, to try to find out who she is. After describing her in detail, Vitelli angrily says he does not know her and leaves. When Michael's bodyguards realize that the girl is Signore Vitelli's daughter, they both ask Michael to leave, but Michael, speaking through his bodyguard and interpreter Fabrizio, soon gains Signore Vitelli's respect by introducing himself and apologizing. Michael asks and receives Signore Vitelli's permission to court Apollonia under the chaperonage of her family. After a brief courtship, they are married. Stefanelli, who was 16 at the time of filming, revealed that when filming the wedding night scene in Sicily, her gown strap slipped revealing her breasts which Coppola insisted on keeping in the scene.

Soon afterward, however, Apollonia is killed by a car bomb intended for Michael, in 1948. The attack was set up by Fabrizio, who had betrayed Michael to Corleone family enemies back in Michael's native New York City. In an unfortunate twist of fate, she unknowingly puts herself in danger when she tries to impress Michael by showing him that she taught herself how to drive, which was uncommon for Sicilian women. In the book, she is pregnant at the time of her death, but this detail is not specified in the film. The explosion is powerful enough to throw Michael off his feet and knock him unconscious. The local Mafia chieftain, Don Tommasino, an old friend of Michael's father Vito, moves Michael to a hospital. Michael regains consciousness a few days later, whereupon Don Tommasino informs Michael of his wife's death. After returning to the United States, Michael reconnects with his previous girlfriend, Kay Adams, but does not tell her that he had been married while he was living in Sicily. They marry and have two children. However, in The Godfather Part III, Kay mentions Michael's first marriage when she and Michael visit Sicily together. Michael also tells his daughter Mary Corleone that she bears a resemblance to his first wife Apollonia.

In the novel, Michael avenges Apollonia's death. Fabrizio is found running a pizza parlor in Buffalo, New York, under the alias of Fred Vincent. He is shot in the chest by an assassin who walks into the pizza parlor. The assassin then tells him "Michael Corleone sends his regards", before shooting him again in the head. In a deleted scene from the film's script, Michael himself kills Fabrizio with a shotgun. This scene was never released, although publicity photos were distributed of Al Pacino, who portrayed Michael, firing a shotgun. A scene was filmed for Part II in which Michael is informed that Fabrizio has been found. The former bodyguard is killed in his car with a powerful bomb wired to the ignition, matching the car bomb that he used to kill Apollonia. The scene was removed from the final cut of the film, but it can be seen in The Godfather Saga.

=== Johnny Fontane ===
Johnny Fontane, a mob-associated singer and Vito's godson, seeks Vito's help in securing a movie role; Vito dispatches his consigliere, Tom Hagen, to Los Angeles to persuade studio head Jack Woltz to give Johnny the part. Woltz refuses until he wakes up in bed with the severed head of his prized stallion.

Al Martino, a then famed singer in nightclubs, was notified of the character Johnny Fontane by a friend who read the eponymous novel and felt Martino represented the character of Johnny Fontane. Martino then contacted producer Albert S. Ruddy, who gave him the part. However, Martino was stripped of the part after Francis Ford Coppola became director and then awarded the role to singer Vic Damone. According to Martino, after being stripped of the role, he went to Russell Bufalino, his godfather and a crime boss, who then orchestrated the publication of various news articles that claimed Coppola was unaware of Ruddy having given Martino the part. Damone eventually dropped the role because he did not want to provoke the mob, in addition to being paid too little. Ultimately, the part of Johnny Fontane was given to Martino.

Frank Sinatra was convinced that Johnny Fontane was based on his life. Mario Puzo, author of The Godfather novel wrote in 1972 that when he met Sinatra in Chasen's, Sinatra "started to shout abuse", calling Puzo a "pimp" and threatening physical violence. Francis Ford Coppola, director of the film adaptation, said in the audio commentary that "obviously Johnny Fontane was inspired by a kind of Frank Sinatra character".

=== Genco Abbandando ===
Genco Abbandando was the first consigliere of the Corleone family, and early friend to Vito Corleone. Frank Sivero portrayed Genco in The Godfather Part II as a young man, and Franco Corsaro portrayed Genco as an old man in a deleted scene in The Godfather.

Raised in New York City's Little Italy, Genco worked at his father's grocery store from an early age. He became friends with the hired hand, Vito Corleone, and was upset when Vito was fired by his father, forced to do so by the neighborhood boss Don Fanucci. Genco offered to steal from his father to help his friend, but Vito refused, saying this would be an offense to his father.

After Vito kills Fanucci and takes over the neighborhood, he makes Genco the second-in-command of his burgeoning criminal organization and names his front company "Genco Pura Olive Oil Company" after his friend. When Vito organizes his criminal interests as the Corleone crime family, Genco serves as his consigliere. Genco serves as Vito's most trusted adviser for over a quarter-century, until he is stricken with cancer and can no longer fulfill his duties. During this time, Tom Hagen, the family lawyer and Vito's informally adopted son, stands in for him. Genco dies in 1945, the day after Vito's daughter Connie's wedding. A scene where Vito visits Genco on his death bed in hospital after the wedding was ultimately cut from The Godfather film.

== Corleone family allies ==
=== Luca Brasi ===
Luca Brasi is an enforcer of the Corleone family. He is not very smart, but his fierce loyalty and strength earned him respect. In The Godfather, he is invited to Connie Corleone's wedding and is shown startled by Don Corleone. Later, he is tasked with gathering information about Virgil Sollozzo under the guise of trying to leave the Corleone family, but Sollozzo understands that it is a trap, and kills Brasi.

=== Peter Clemenza ===
Peter Clemenza is an old friend of Vito Corleone and a caporegime. He is Sonny Corleone's godfather and mentor; he selects and trains several other capos. In the first appearance in Godfather, Clemenza oversees the revenge beatings of the attempted rapists and assaulters of Amerigo Bonasera's daughter. He personally takes part in the killing of Paulie Gatto, who turned to work for Virgil Sollozzo. Clemenza procures a gun that Michael Corleone will use to kill Sollozzo and Captain McCluskey, and teaches Michael how to kill people in a public place. Afterwards, he participates in the war against the other four families and later kills several prominent members of the four families after the ceasefire.

=== Al Neri ===
Al Neri is a bodyguard and assassin working for the Corleone family, "Michael's Luca Brasi". Recruited by Peter Clemenza from the police as an exception, he participates in the "baptism killings" by shooting Emilio Barzini and his bodyguards in The Godfather (in the book, he also kills Moe Greene while in the film it is done by another assassin). In The Godfather Part II, Neri kills the sex worker whose murder is used to blackmail Senator Pat Geary and shoots Fredo Corleone in the head on Michael's orders. In the Part III, Neri takes Fredo's place as the underboss; he saves Michael's life during an assassination attempt by Joey Zasa and helps Vincent Corleone with planning of the revenge. At the end of the film, he kills Archbishop Gilday.

=== Frank Pentangeli ===
Frank Pentangeli is a top soldier in Peter Clemenza's regime who replaces his capo after his death. Pentangeli betrays the Corleones and collaborates with the police, preparing to testify against Michael in court, but is then scared when his own brother shows up in the courtroom, disapproving of the betrayal. Thomas Hagen then meets with Pentangeli and suggests that he commits suicide, which he does.

=== Salvatore "Sal" Tessio ===
Salvatore Tessio is a caporegime working for the Corleone family in Brooklyn. He betrays the Corleone family and attempts to organise Michael's assassination after the death of Vito Corleone, but is found out and taken away by Corleone's own assassins.

=== Don Tommasino ===
Don Tommasino is a Sicilian Mafia Don controlling the towns of Corleone and possibly Bagheria. He appears in all three films, and has been a loyal ally of the Corleone family for almost half a century. He first appears while assisting and protecting Michael Corleone during his hiding in the American-occupied Sicily in The Godfather, hosting him first in Corleone and then in his own countryside villa, and acting as his liaison with Sonny in New York City. He is later seen in The Godfather Part II during Vito's storyline, as he "introduces" Vito to Don Ciccio in the 1920s (purportedly to ask for his blessing to start their olive oil exportation business, possibly implying that he has a role in the Corleones' cover company) and aiding him in the chieftain's assassination, after which he is shot by Don Ciccio's soldati, leaving him partly paralyzed from the waist down. It is obviously implied that he takes the Don's place as the Mafia boss of Corleone. He last appears in The Godfather Part III, now forced on a wheelchair, hosting the Corleones at his villa. He is killed by the contract killers Mosca and Spara as he recognises them when they try to kill Michael disguised as friars. His death has a notable impact on Michael, ultimately leading him to decide to abandon Mafia life.

Unlike most other Dons in the saga, Tommasino is known by his name/nickname rather than by his surname, according to the actual Sicilian use ("Tommasino" is a diminutive for "Tommaso"). Don Tommasino is portrayed by Corrado Gaipa as an adult in Part I, by Mario Cotone as a young man in Part II and by Vittorio Duse as an old man in Part III.

=== Rocco Lampone ===
Rocco Lampone, better known only as Rocco, is at first a mafia soldier, and later Michael Corleone's capo, head of security and assassin. Lampone appears in two of the three films. Lampone was born September 3, 1911. Once a soldier who was sent home from the front with a Purple Heart after having his leg crippled due to a shattered kneecap in 1943. Lampone began his career in organized crime during the Peter Clemenza regime, assassinating Paulie Gatto in Part I. He is promoted to capo shortly after Michael Corleone returns from Sicily, heading a newly created regime. He and one of his soldiers kill Philip Tattaglia and a prostitute.

After the family moves to Nevada, Rocco arranges security for the family's Lake Tahoe compound; he is, however, unable to prevent an attempted murder of Michael by two gangsters employed by his rival Hyman Roth brought into the mansion by his brother and traitor Fredo Corleone. Eventually, when Michael Corleone decides to take revenge on Roth, it is Rocco who opines at the conclave held at the lake house that assassinating the mob boss is "difficult but not impossible," and they personally entrust him with the assassination. Disguised as a reporter, Rocco approaches Roth at the Miami airport and shoots him, but despite the panic and confusion that ensues, a federal agent shoots and kills him in return. Rocco also appears in the novel The Godfather Returns.

Lampone is portrayed by Tom Rosqui in the first two parts of The Godfather. It was planned for him to return for The Godfather Part III but was ultimately ruled out following Rosqui's illness which led to his death in 1991.

== Corleone family enemies ==
=== Captain McCluskey ===
Captain Mark McCluskey is a corrupt Irish American New York police captain. He appears in Mario Puzo's The Godfather and in Francis Ford Coppola's film adaptation, where he is portrayed by Sterling Hayden.

Virgil Sollozzo unsuccessfully attempts to assassinate Don Vito Corleone after a failed attempt to obtain financing and police and political protection for his emerging heroin business. When Sollozzo learns Corleone survived, he sends agents to the hospital for another attempt by having Captain McCluskey (Sterling Hayden), a New York City police captain on his payroll, arrest Don Corleone's personal guards at the hospital and remove the police officers stationed outside the Don's hospital room. The assassination attempt fails after Vito's youngest son Michael arrives, and finding all the guards gone, suspects another assassination attempt is about to happen. He moves his father to another room, then tricks the would-be assassins into believing guards are still protecting his father. Captain McCluskey arrives and confronts Michael, punching him and breaking his jaw. Hagen arrives shortly afterwards with guards legally licensed to carry weapons; McCluskey, unable to arrest them without raising suspicions, backs down and leaves.

Soon after, Sollozzo seeks a meeting with Michael to resolve the hostilities, although at Michael's urging, the Corleones view this as an opportunity to kill Sollozzo, which would, of necessity, also involve killing McCluskey. Michael successfully convinces Sonny Corleone, Tom Hagen and other leaders of the Family that the usual strict Mafia prohibition against killing police for fear of bringing down the retribution of the authorities should not apply in this case, since McCluskey is a corrupt cop on the mafia's payroll, and who is involved in drugs. He further says that this would make a sensational news story to be given to newspaper people on the Corleone Family payroll after the fact.

Under McCluskey's personal protection, Sollozzo meets with Michael in a Bronx restaurant. Although Michael is frisked before the meeting, a revolver has been planted behind the overhead tank of a toilet in the restaurant's lavatory. The Corleones were able to do this only because they found out in advance, from a cop in McCluskey's precinct, where the meeting would take place, on account of police regulations requiring McCluskey to leave an address where he could be reached that night. Michael excuses himself to go to the bathroom, and retrieves the revolver. When he returns, he draws the gun and shoots Sollozzo in the forehead, killing him instantly, and kills McCluskey with two shots moments later.

Although the double murder, including that of a police captain, brings an official crackdown on organized crime, the subsequent leak of information about McCluskey's criminal links to Sollozzo - as Michael correctly predicted - gets wide coverage in the newspapers and takes some of the attention off Michael and his family.

=== Johnny Ola ===
Johnny Ola is a mobster and right-hand man to Jewish mobster Hyman Roth. He appears in The Godfather Part II portrayed by Dominic Chianese.

Ola is Sicilian but speaks American English with a New York accent. He is part of Roth's plan to assassinate Michael Corleone at his home at Lake Tahoe, with unwitting help from Michael's brother Fredo. When Michael asks if Fredo and Johnny had ever met, they deny knowing each other. Later, however, Fredo carelessly reveals that he and Ola had visited a nightclub together in Havana. Michael overhears the conversation and realizes that Fredo is the traitor within the family. Michael sends his bodyguard Bussetta to kill Ola and Roth. Bussetta strangles Ola, but is shot to death by Cuban military police while attempting to kill Roth in his hospital bed. Ola is based on real life mob enforcer Vincent Alo.

=== Louie Russo ===
Luigi "Louie" Russo serves as the Don of the Chicago Outfit from 1955 to 1961. He appears in Mark Winegardner's The Godfather Returns.

Louie Russo and his brother, Willy, were 'made' under Al Capone. His brother was one of the men sent to kill Vito Corleone during the Castellammarese War (mentioned in The Godfather), although he was eventually killed by Luca Brasi.

Russo holds a grudge against the Corleones for years for his brother's death, at one point attempting (unsuccessfully) to have Vito's son Fredo killed. After Michael Corleone becomes Don in 1955, however, Russo tricks him into believing that the bad blood between them is over. Under Russo, the Chicago mob expands into the New York area and interferes with the Corleones' Las Vegas casinos. Russo unsuccessfully conspires with Vincent Forlenza and Nick Geraci to kill Michael Corleone, in the process indirectly duping Fredo into betraying his brother to Hyman Roth.

In June 1961, he invites Tom Hagen to his supper club/gambling house in rural Illinois with the intention of killing him. He, Hagen, a rower, and two Russo soldatos go out on a gondola in his man-made lake. On the course of the trip, as part of Michael's revenge, Hagen strangles one soldato while the rower hits Russo and the other soldato with his oar. Hagen then personally kills Russo on his boat, with Russo's own gun, and dumps the bodies in the lake.

In his appearances in The Godfather Returns, Russo is portrayed as a cruel, vindictive man whose methods of retribution are particularly vicious, even by Mafia standards; in the sequel The Godfather's Revenge, Tom Hagen describes Russo as "a sick man, in ways I don't like to think about." Following an assassination attempt years before, in which his eyes are permanently damaged, he wears large black sunglasses to shield them from the light. When he inadvertently shows his uncovered eyes to Tom Hagen after his glasses are knocked off, Hagen notes that they are red with a green ring in the middle. The novel reveals that Russo is estranged from his gay son, but still uses him as a source of information on closeted rivals for purposes of blackmail and gamesmanship with the other families.

=== Virgil Sollozzo ===
Virgil "The Turk" Sollozzo is a drug kingpin who sided with Tattaglia mafia family. He appears in Mario Puzo's novel The Godfather and is portrayed by Al Lettieri in the film adaptation of the same title.

In 1945, heroin kingpin Virgil Sollozzo asks Vito to invest in his operation. Sollozzo is backed by the rival Tattaglia family, and wants Vito's political influence and legal protection. Vito declines, believing the politicians and judges on his payroll would turn against him if he engaged in drug trafficking. During the meeting, Sonny expresses interest in the deal. After the meeting, Vito castigates his son for letting an outsider know what he was thinking. During Christmas, as Vito crosses a street to buy oranges from a vendor, Sollozzo's hitmen emerge with guns drawn. Vito runs for his Cadillac, but is shot five times. Fredo, who had been accompanying Vito, drops his gun and is unable to return fire as the assassins escape.

Vito survives, and Sollozzo makes a second assassination attempt at the hospital. Mark McCluskey—a corrupt police captain on Sollozzo's payroll—has removed Vito's bodyguards, leaving him unprotected. However, Michael arrives moments before the imminent attack. Realizing his father is in danger, Michael and a nurse move Vito to another room. Michael affirms his loyalty to his father at Vito's bedside.

While Vito recovers, Sonny serves as acting head of the family. Michael, knowing his father will never be safe while Sollozzo lives, convinces Sonny that he can murder Sollozzo and McCluskey. Michael kills both men in a Bronx restaurant—where Sollozzo promises McCluskey the veal is "the best in the city"—and is smuggled to Sicily under the protection of Vito's friend and business partner Don Tommasino. The deaths of Sollozzo and McCluskey ignite a war between the Corleone and the Tattaglia families, with the other New York families backing the latter. After Sonny is killed by Barzini's men, Vito resumes control and brokers a peace accord among the families, during which he realizes that Barzini masterminded the attempt on his life and Sonny's murder.

=== Joey Zasa ===
Joey Zasa is a caporegime of the Corleone family who betrays them and attempts to kill Michael Corleone. He appears in The Godfather Part III portrayed by Joe Mantegna.

Zasa is a longtime member of Peter Clemenza's regime. Following the retirement of Ritchie Nobilio, who succeeded Frank Pentangeli (Michael V. Gazzo) after the events of The Godfather Part II, Zasa assumes control over the Corleone family business in New York City with approval from the Commission and Michael Corleone (Al Pacino). Zasa is feared and, to a certain degree, respected among his peers in the New York underworld for his business acumen and utter ruthlessness. However, his flamboyance and hunger for publicity (like those of the real-life John Gotti) become something of an embarrassment to his fellow criminals, thus earning Michael's displeasure especially during the 1970s when it attracts unwanted public attention to Michael's criminal past when he is attempting to rehabilitate his public image. Michael especially disapproves of Zasa's eagerness to enter the drug trade, and distances himself from him.

In The Godfather Part III, Zasa first appears at a reception honoring Michael. He gets into an argument with one of his soldiers, Vincent Mancini (Andy García), the illegitimate son of Sonny Corleone. Zasa calls Vincent a bastard in Michael's presence, prompting the enraged young man to attack Zasa by biting off a piece of Zasa's ear. Zasa subsequently hires two assassins to kill Vincent, but Vincent quickly kills both.

Later in the film, Zasa participates in a plot to have Michael assassinated during a meeting with the various Dons in Atlantic City, New Jersey. During the meeting, Michael insults Zasa, prompting him to storm out; moments later, a helicopter containing gunmen hovers above the room and guns down nearly everyone inside. Michael escapes, but nearly every other Don is killed. The survivors make deals with Zasa.

Several days later, Michael's sister Connie (Talia Shire) gives clearance for Vincent to kill Zasa before he can take another run at Michael. Vincent assassinates Zasa in Little Italy during a street festival. Vincent's men and Michael's personal assassin Al Neri (disguised as members of the church procession) kill Zasa's bodyguards, while Vincent (disguised as an NYPD Mounted Patrol officer) shoots Zasa in the back three times as he attempts to escape.

== Other characters ==
=== Amerigo Bonasera ===
Amerigo Bonasera is an undertaker who uses his connection to the Corleone family to get justice, denied to him by the American legal system. Bonasera appears in the novel The Godfather, as well as Francis Ford Coppola's 1972 film adaptation. He is a side character who plays an important role in revealing the merciful side of main character Vito Corleone. The novel opens with the words: "Amerigo Bonasera sat at New York Criminal Court..." The film also starts with his line, "I believe in America. America has made my fortune."

Bonasera is a proud Italian-American who tends to keep away from the Corleone family, knowing they are involved with the Mafia, though Don Corleone's wife is a godmother to Bonasera's daughter. His daughter is brutally beaten by her boyfriend and his friend who attempt to sexually assault her. The men escape any serious penalty because they are from wealthy, politically connected families.

Desperate, Bonasera decides to go to Don Corleone on the day of his daughter's wedding to ask him to kill the young men; according to tradition, a Sicilian never refuses a favor on the day of his daughter's wedding. His proposition angers Don Corleone, who reprimands him for asking for a favor without showing the proper respect, and for seeking the attackers' deaths when his daughter was alive and would recover. Nevertheless, Vito agrees to grant a favor in return for Bonasera's "friendship" and the respectful address of "Godfather". Vito Corleone also gently reprimands Bonasera for attempting to seek justice through the courts instead of coming to him first.

Vito hands the job to Peter Clemenza with explicit instructions that his men aren't to get "carried away" and accidentally kill anyone. The next evening, Paulie Gatto and two other members of his crew give the men a brutal beating that puts them in the hospital for months. Bonasera sends his thanks to Vito through Corleone family consigliere Tom Hagen. Though feeling safer now that he has Don Corleone on his side, Bonasera begins dreading the day Corleone asks him a favor; he has a nightmare of the Don ordering him to bury the bodies of two men he has just killed.

Later in the film, Hagen calls on Bonasera to finally pay back the favor. Initially terrified, Bonasera is relieved when Vito Corleone comes to his funeral parlor with the corpse of his eldest son, Sonny Corleone, who has been gunned down by the Barzini family. A heartbroken Vito merely requests that Bonasera repair the extensive physical damage so that Sonny's mother can have an open casket. Bonasera is seen one final time at Vito Corleone's funeral; the novel states he had fulfilled all obligations and satisfied their friendship by preparing Sonny's body for burial.

In the 1972 film, Bonasera is played by Salvatore Corsitto (1913–1999).

In the 2006 video game adaptation, Aldo Trapani, instead of Clemenza, is ordered to punish the two perpetrators, who are found in the graveyard outside Bonasera's funeral home harassing Bonasera's daughter. He attacks the assailants, knocking them out and leaving one in an open grave.

=== Lucy Mancini ===
Lucy Mancini is one of the characters in Mario Puzo's The Godfather. She was portrayed by Jeannie Linero and appears in The Godfather and The Godfather Part III.

Mancini is a childhood friend of Vito Corleone's daughter, Connie Corleone, and serves as the maid of honor at Connie's wedding. Lucy has sex with Vito's son Sonny at the wedding and begins an extramarital affair with him. The novel and the films diverge in their treatments of Lucy's fate after Sonny's death.

In the novel, Lucy is a fairly important supporting character, with several chapters dedicated to her story. After Sonny's death, Vito's consigliere, Tom Hagen sends Lucy to Las Vegas. She is given a small interest (five and later ten "points") in one of the family's hotels, primarily so that she can keep an eye on Vito's middle son, Fredo, who is learning the hotel and casino business. She also serves as a shareholder-of-record who has no criminal record: several such owners are necessary for a valid gaming license. On paper she is a millionaire, although she does not vote her shares in the casinos. Eventually, Lucy establishes a new life in Las Vegas, and becomes largely independent of the Corleone clan. She is lonely, however, and occasionally pines for Sonny: while never having loved him or even truly known him, she misses him as a lover, and cannot achieve sexual satisfaction with anyone else. That changes when she meets and falls in love with surgeon Dr. Jules Segal. He explains that her difficulty in reaching orgasm is caused by a loose vagina, which commonly results from multiple childbirths. In Lucy's case, this appears to be congenital and can be remedied with simple vaginal surgery. After Segal's colleague in Los Angeles performs the surgery, Lucy is able to enjoy sex again, and she and Jules presumably are happily married.

In Francis Ford Coppola's film adaptations, Lucy's role is minimal. She is seen as a young woman in The Godfather, but her character is not featured after Sonny's death. She makes no appearance in The Godfather Part II, and in The Godfather Part III, she is present in a manner inconsistent with her fate as described in The Godfather novel. Lucy is the mother of Sonny's illegitimate son, Vincent, who eventually succeeds Michael Corleone as the head of the Corleone crime family. She appears briefly as a guest in the party scene at the beginning of the film when Michael invites Vincent to join the family for a group photo. In Puzo's original novel, Sonny does not impregnate her.

=== Jack Woltz ===
Jack Woltz is a ruthless, cutthroat movie producer portrayed by John Marley in The Godfather (1972) and who also features marginally more prominently in the novel of the same name. In the film, events involving him occur as follows:

Woltz is a movie producer, currently making an epic war picture. Despite the fact that Johnny Fontane would be perfect for the role of the film's hero, Woltz staunchly refuses to cast him. Fontane visits Vito Corleone on the day of his daughter's wedding to ask if the mafia Don is able to get him the part, and starts breaking down. Vito tells him to "act like a man" but, as Johnny is his godson, he agrees to get the part for him.

Vito sends Tom Hagen to visit Woltz, and while Woltz still staunchly refuses, he invites Hagen to his home. Woltz shows Hagen around his luxurious manor, and shows him his expensive racehorse: Khartoum. At dinner, Woltz tells Hagen that he will not cast Fontane because he ran off with an actress he loved. Tom leaves telling Woltz that Vito is a man who will want to hear bad news immediately. At the same time, Hagen notices that Woltz is having an affair with Jane, a 15-year-old teenage actress whom he had seen the day before at the studio. Vito, upon learning this, calls it "infamy."

The next day, Woltz wakes up to find blood covering his bed. Frantically pulling off his bedsheets, he soon discovers he is not bleeding. It is, in fact, the severed head of his horse: Khartoum. Woltz later casts Johnny in the part.

== The Five Families ==
The Five Families are five major Mafia crime families in the novel and film The Godfather. The families are based on the real life New York City Five Families, five major Italian American crime families.

=== The Corleones ===
The Dons of the Corleone family:

- Vito Corleone (1920–1955)
- Michael Corleone (1955–1980)
- Vincent Corleone (1980–unknown)

=== The Tattaglias ===
The Dons of the Tattaglia family:

- Philip Tattaglia (1920s–1955)
- Riccardo "Rico" Tattaglia (1955–1962)
- Osvaldo "Ozzie" Altobello (1962–1980)

=== The Barzinis ===
The Dons of the Barzini family:

- Giuseppe Mariposa (1920s–1934)
- Emilio Barzini (1934–1955)
- Paulie Fortunato (1955–19??)

=== The Cuneos ===
The Dons of the Cuneo family:

- Carmine Cuneo/Ottilio Cuneo (1920s–1955)
- Leo Cuneo (1955–1979)

=== The Straccis ===
The Dons of the Stracci family:

- Anthony Stracci/Victor Stracci (1920s–1955)
- Mario Stracci (1955–1972)
