= Frank Pentangeli =

Fictional character from The Godfather series

- Michael V. Gazzo portraying Frank Pentangeli
- First appearance: The Godfather Part II
- Last appearance: The Family Corleone
- Created by: Mario Puzo
- Portrayed by: Michael V. Gazzo
- Voiced by: Gavin Hammon

In-universe information
- Alias: Francesco Pentangeli (birth name)
- Nickname: Frankie Five Angels
- Gender: Male
- Title: Street boss Capo; Soldato
- Occupation: Mobster
- Family: Corleone (1934–1959); Mariposa (1920s–1934)
- Spouse: Unnamed wife
- Children: Two unnamed daughters
- Relatives: Vincenzo Pentangeli (brother)

Frank Pentangeli is a fictional character from the 1974 film The Godfather Part II, portrayed by Michael V. Gazzo. Gazzo was nominated for a Best Supporting Actor Oscar for his performance, which he lost to Robert De Niro, his co-star from the same film (as young Vito Corleone). He is nicknamed "Frankie Five Angels" from his last name, which is formed from the Greek-derived prefix penta- (meaning "five") and the Italian word angeli ("angels").

== Character overview ==
Born Francesco Pentangeli in Partinico, Sicily, Pentangeli has an older brother named Vincenzo who remained in Sicily when Frank emigrated to the United States.

In The Godfather Part II, Pentangeli is portrayed as one of godfather Vito Corleone's (Marlon Brando) most trusted associates. He was a top soldier in the regime of Peter Clemenza (Richard S. Castellano in the first film) for three decades, and succeeded him as caporegime after Clemenza's death. Frank runs the Corleone family's operations in New York City while Michael Corleone (Al Pacino), his brother and underboss, Fredo (John Cazale), consigliere Tom Hagen and the other two capos, Rocco Lampone (Tom Rosqui) and Al Neri (Richard Bright), are based in Nevada. His bodyguard is longtime soldier Willi Cicci (Joe Spinell). Shortly after Michael moved to Nevada, Pentangeli moved into Vito's former estate in Long Beach, Long Island. But a rift grows between Pentangeli and Michael that eventually results in Pentangeli betraying the family.

Pentangeli's character was created in The Godfather Part II by Coppola and Puzo after Richard Castellano declined to reprise his role as Clemenza. The Pentangeli character took the part in the plot which was originally intended for Clemenza, whose death was to be set anti-parallel to the extended sequence in which the young Vito becomes Clemenza's partner.

Coppola, in his director's commentary on The Godfather Part II, says that the scenes depicting the Senate committee interrogation of Michael Corleone and Pentangeli are based on the Joseph Valachi federal hearings and that Pentangeli is a Valachi-like figure.

== In the film ==
Near the beginning of the story, Pentangeli asks Michael for help eliminating the Rosato brothers, rivals in New York, who claimed to have been promised territories by Clemenza before his death. Michael refuses and orders Pentangeli to do nothing, as he does not want a war to interfere with an upcoming deal with Hyman Roth (Lee Strasberg), who supports the Rosatos. Pentangeli takes this as an insult and leaves in anger. Later that night, Michael narrowly escapes an assassination attempt at his home.

Michael concludes that Roth was behind the attempt. After visiting Florida to seal the deal with Roth, Michael visits Pentangeli on Long Island and asks him to help take his revenge. He insists that Pentangeli capitulate to the Rosato brothers so that Roth will not suspect that Michael is on to him. Pentangeli prefers open warfare against Roth and the Rosatos, but reluctantly obeys Michael's order.

Pentangeli arranges a meeting with the Rosato brothers. Leaving his bodyguard outside, he enters the bar, where Tony Rosato (Danny Aiello) ambushes him with a garotte, telling him, "Michael Corleone says hello." A policeman steps in, and the attack degenerates into a shootout in the street. Pentangeli disappears and is believed to be dead.

Later, at a Senate hearing investigating organized crime and allegations of Michael's criminal activities, Michael learns that the committee intends to call Pentangeli as a surprise witness to contradict Michael's denial that he is a crime boss. Pentangeli and Cicci have been in the protective custody of the FBI since the attempt upon his life. Believing that Michael ordered him murdered, Pentangeli provides a sworn statement to investigators that Michael is the head of the most powerful Mafia family in the nation, controls virtually all gambling activity in North America, and has ordered countless murders.

Most damningly, Cicci tells investigators that Michael personally killed Captain McCluskey and Virgil Sollozzo (portrayed by Sterling Hayden and Al Lettieri respectively in The Godfather), and also began planning a mass slaughter of New York's other Mafia bosses as early as 1950. Cicci has also disclosed this to the FBI. However, he is unable to implicate Michael directly in any criminal activities; due to "buffers" in the Corleone organization, he never received orders directly from Michael. However, since Pentangeli was a capo; there was no insulation between Michael and himself. The Senate subcommittee and the FBI consider Pentangeli very credible, and are certain that he can corroborate Cicci's testimony and charge Michael with perjury.

While the committee is in recess, Michael and others look for a way to avoid the perjury charges. Fredo, who had unknowingly conspired with Michael's enemies, informs Michael that the hearing was engineered by Roth as part of his plan to eliminate him from the scene; plus, the committee's lawyer is on Roth's payroll.

Michael knows that Pentangeli's protective custody is too secure to make an attempt on his life before he testifies. Instead, Michael flies Pentangeli's brother, Vincenzo, in from Sicily, and Vincenzo accompanies Michael to the hearing at which Frank is scheduled to testify. Vincenzo and Frank exchange a silent glance before the hearing. Frightened, Frank recants his earlier statements, saying he "told the FBI guys what they wanted to hear," and now claims that the Corleone family is innocent of any wrongdoing, thus perjuring himself before the Senate committee. This testimony catches the committee off-guard and derails the government's case against Michael.

After the hearing, Corleone family consigliere Tom Hagen (Robert Duvall) visits Pentangeli in custody. Hagen tells Pentangeli, a history buff, a story about how traitors in ancient Rome could spare their families if they committed suicide; the implication being that Michael will take care of Pentangeli's family if he kills himself. Pentangeli thanks Hagen, returns to his assigned quarters, and slits his wrists while taking a bath.

The finished film leaves unclear exactly what about his brother's presence motivated Pentangeli to change his story. The final film only states that Vincenzo is a powerful and ruthless Mafia chieftain in Sicily.

An early draft of the film's script explains that Vincenzo, shocked that his brother is about to break his blood oath, attends the hearing to remind Frank that he must not break the Mafia's code of silence, omertà. This is also spelled out in a cut scene in The Godfather II video game. His brother's presence, as well as the stare they exchange, serves as a threat that if Frank follows through with his planned testimony, retribution will be taken against his children, who are living in Sicily under Vincenzo's guardianship.

== In popular culture ==
This character made the national news on January 25, 2019, when he was mentioned in the federal indictment of President Donald Trump's longtime adviser Roger Stone. Stone was arrested in Fort Lauderdale, Florida, and charged with seven counts through an indictment in special counsel Robert Mueller III's investigation into Russian interference in the 2016 U.S. presidential election: one count of obstructing an official proceeding, five counts of making false statements, and one count of witness tampering. "The indictment contains a reference to a character from 'The Godfather: Part II' who is intimidated into not testifying against a mafia boss. According to the indictment, Stone in late 2017 told an associate — identified as "Person 2" — that they should "do a 'Frank Pentangeli' before [the House Intelligence Committee] in order to avoid contradicting Stone's testimony.' The filing goes on to say, "Frank Pentangeli is a character in the film The Godfather: Part II, which both Stone and Person 2 had discussed, who testifies before a congressional committee and in that testimony claims not to know critical information that he does in fact know."
