= The Godfather (2006 video game) =

2006 video game

- Developers: EA Redwood Shores (Wii, Xbox 360 & PS3); Headgate Studios (Windows); Page 44 Studios (PS2, PSP & Xbox)
- Publisher: Electronic Arts
- Producer: Hunter Smith
- Designers: Philip Campbell; Mike Olsen; Michael Perry
- Artist: Margaret Foley-Mauvais
- Writers: Philip Campbell; Mark Winegardner
- Composers: Bill Conti; Ashley Irwin
- Series: The Godfather
- Engine: RenderWare
- Platforms: PlayStation 2; Windows; Xbox; PlayStation Portable; Xbox 360; Wii; PlayStation 3
- Release: March 21, 2006: PlayStation 2, Windows, Xbox; NA: March 21, 2006; AU: March 23, 2006; EU: March 24, 2006 PlayStation Portable, Xbox 360; NA: September 19, 2006; EU: September 22, 2006; AU: September 28, 2006 Wii; NA: March 20, 2007; AU: March 22, 2007; EU: March 23, 2007 PlayStation 3; NA: March 20, 2007; AU: March 29, 2007; EU: April 20, 2007
- Genre: Action-adventure
- Modes: Single-player, multiplayer (Note: Only on 7th generation consoles. EA discontinued multiplayer support and decommissioned the servers in 2010.)

The Godfather is a 2006 action-adventure video game developed by EA Redwood Shores and published by Electronic Arts. It was originally released in March 2006 for Windows, PlayStation 2, and Xbox. It was later released for the PlayStation Portable, (Note: Released as The Godfather: Mob Wars) Xbox 360, Wii, (Note: Released as The Godfather: Blackhand Edition) and PlayStation 3. (Note: Released as The Godfather: The Don's Edition)

Based upon the 1972 film The Godfather, the game follows a non-canon character, Aldo Trapani (who can be renamed by the player), who is recruited into the Corleone family and works his way up its ranks while seeking revenge against his father's killers. The story of the game intersects with the film on numerous occasions, depicting major events from Aldo's perspective, or showing him perform actions that happened off-screen; for example, he avenges Bonasera's daughter, kills Luca Brasi's assassin, drives Vito Corleone to the hospital after he is shot, plants the gun for Michael Corleone to kill Sollozzo and Captain McCluskey, and places the horse's head in Jack Woltz's bed. Although the game was condemned by Francis Ford Coppola, who claimed Paramount never told him about its development or asked for his input, it does feature voice acting from several stars of the film, including James Caan as Sonny Corleone, Robert Duvall as Tom Hagen and Abe Vigoda as Salvatore Tessio. Marlon Brando also recorded dialogue for Vito Corleone, in what would be his final acting job, but his ill health made most of his recordings unusable.

The Godfather received generally positive reviews across most systems, although the PlayStation Portable version was commonly seen as inferior to the others. The game was a commercial success, selling over four million units. A sequel, based on the 1974 film, The Godfather Part II, was released for PlayStation 3, Xbox 360 and Windows in 2009, but it received mixed reviews and did not sell as well as the first game, causing EA to scrap plans for an adaptation of the third film.

== Gameplay ==
The Godfather is an open world action-adventure game played from a third-person perspective, in which the player controls protagonist Aldo Trapani as he ascends through the ranks of the Corleone family, with his rise intersecting with the narrative of the film on numerous occasions. The basic gameplay and game mechanics are similar to most open world titles as the player can travel across the city freely, commandeer vehicles, do whatever they want in terms of attacking and/or killing innocent civilians, and progress through the storyline at their own leisure, spending as much time traversing the city as they wish.

=== Combat ===
Basic gameplay in The Godfather. The HUD shows the mini-map on the bottom right, Aldo's currently selected weapon and ammo on the bottom left, his health, experience bar and funds on the top left, and his currently targeted opponent's health and family affiliation on the top right.

Much of the game is based around third-person shooting, with the player able to wield a .38 snub nose, a pistol, a magnum, a Tommy gun, and a shotgun, as well as projectiles such as Molotov cocktails and dynamite. The game features both a lock-on system and a manual aiming system. In the manual system, the players have complete freedom to aim wherever they wish. In the lock-on system, when the player locks a target, a targeting reticule appears on-screen. The longer the player is locked on, the smaller the reticule gets, allowing for more precise aiming. Within the lock-on system, the player also has a certain degree of freedom to aim manually; the reticule can be moved around the locked on target, allowing the player to target specific areas. If the reticule turns red, the player has found a weak point. All enemies have five weak points: their two knees and their two shoulders, plus their groin. If the player shoots one of their knees, the enemy will no longer be able to run, but will continue to shoot back. If the player hits a shoulder, the enemy won't be able to fire back or fight. Hitting the groin accomplishes the same effect as a knee shot, also stunning the target.

The other mode of combat in the game is melee combat, for which the game uses a system dubbed "BlackHand", after the Black Hand extortion method. Once the player has locked onto an NPC, either hostile or non-hostile, they use the right analog stick to engage in melee combat. The system allows for light attacks, heavy attacks and directional attacks. It also allows the player to swing the opponent around, drag them, strangle them, lift them to their feet if they fall to their knees, slam them against walls, smash their head against counters, throw them over ledges and out windows, and perform execution maneuvers when the opponent is suitably weakened. Players can also wield numerous melee weapons, such as baseball bats, tire irons, police batons, and wrenches. For the PlayStation 3 Don's Edition and the Wii Blackhand Edition, the BlackHand system has been enhanced, utilizing the motion sensor capabilities of the Sixaxis and the Wii Remote.

=== Extortion and rival families ===
The intimidation mechanic in The Godfather. Note the multicolored bar on the top right. The blue meter represents the current level of intimidation. The green line represents the point at which the shopkeeper will agree to pay protection money. The red area indicates the level of intimidation at which the shopkeeper will fight back.

A major part of The Godfather's gameplay is extorting businesses. The player must extort business to earn enough respect to level up, to complete certain missions, and to earn money. When the player is attempting to intimidate a business owner into paying protection money, a meter appears on screen with a green bar and a red bar. To get the owner to agree to pay, the player must intimidate them until the meter fills up to the green bar. After this point, the more intimidation the player can achieve, the more money the owner will pay out. However, if the meter passes the red bar, the owner will begin to fight back and will refuse to pay anything. Every business owner has a weak point, something they particularly fear, and if the player finds it, the amount of money paid out will rise faster than the meter fills, allowing the player to extort more money before the meter reaches the red zone. Intimidation methods include beating the owner up, throwing them around, smashing their shop, attacking customers, or pointing firearms at them. In the Xbox 360, Wii and PlayStation 3 versions of the game, the player will occasionally have the option of carrying out a favor for a business owner rather than intimidating them. This can involve carrying out a hit on someone, scaring someone, or going to a particular location at a particular time. If the player chooses to perform the favor, the amount of protection money paid by the owner will be maximized.

There are five main geographical regions in the game; Little Italy (controlled by the Corleone family), Brooklyn (controlled by the Tattaglia family), New Jersey (controlled by the Stracci family), Hell's Kitchen (controlled by the Cuneo family) and Midtown (controlled by the Barzini family). At the start of the game, the entire map is available for the player to explore, but the game encourages the player to remain in Little Italy, as it is the easiest area of which to gain control. To completely control an area, the player must extort all business and rackets owned by the other families, and take over their warehouses and hubs. Many businesses serve as fronts to rackets, which can be taken over in a similar manner to the front, although in the case of a racket, the player has the option of simply buying the racket boss out. Controlling rackets yield the player more money than extorting businesses.

The player can also gain control of warehouses and hubs. Warehouses supply rackets, and hubs supply warehouses. Both warehouses and hubs are heavily guarded, and the player must fight their way inside, and find the boss, who they can then intimidate as with business owners and racket bosses. Warehouses pay out more than rackets and hubs pay out more than warehouses. Ultimately, the player must tackle the enemies' strongest holdout - their compound. Once the compound is destroyed, that family has been defeated. To destroy a compound, the player must fight their way inside and then plant a bomb. All compounds have two buildings, both of which must be bombed, and are heavily guarded by soldiers and enforcers aligned with the controlling family.

=== Vendetta and heat ===
As the player takes over rival families' businesses and kills their men, their vendetta level will rise. If it gets too high, a mob war will break out. This results in members of the opposing family attacking the player on sight, and going after Corleone-owned businesses, rackets, warehouses and hubs. The ways to win a mob war are to either bomb a rival family business in retaliation or bribe an FBI agent to distract the opposing family until the vendetta level has lowered.

As well as vendetta levels, the player must also be aware of "heat" during the game. Shooting rival family members in public, killing civilians and innocent people, or attacking police officers will all raise heat levels. If the level gets too high, police will fire upon the player on sight. To avoid this, the player can bribe police to ignore them for a while. Alternatively, bribing a police captain will earn the player a specific amount of time during which the police will turn a blind eye to illegal actions. In the Xbox 360, Wii, and PlayStation 3 versions, bribed police will fight on the player's side in shootouts with rival families. Also in the Xbox 360, Wii, and PlayStation 3 versions, the player can blackmail rather than bribe the captain, but only if certain information has been learned from an NPC about the captain's activities.

=== Rank ===
In addition to extorting businesses and attempting to destroy rival families, the player must also engage in story missions. Completing story missions is the only way for the player to advance in rank in the Corleone family, moving from Outsider through the ranks of Enforcer, Associate, Soldier, Capo, Underboss, Don and, finally, Don of NYC. However, completing all of the storyline missions will only take the player to the level of Underboss. To achieve the Don of NYC level, the player must take over all rival businesses, rackets, warehouses, and hubs, destroy all compounds, and own every safehouse.

Apart from progressing in rank in the Corleone family, the other method of progression in the game involves "Respect". Earning respect allows the player to level up, which awards skill points to spend on various attributes. Respect can be earned by numerous means, such as completing missions, extorting businesses, taking over rackets, blowing up safes, bribing police officers, robbing banks, successfully flirting with women, entering new areas, carrying out execution maneuvers, or performing hits and favors.

== Plot ==
In Little Italy in 1936, a young Aldo Trapani (voiced by Andrew Pifko) witnesses his father Johnny (Adam Harrington), a soldato in the Corleone family, being killed by the rival Barzini family. Don Vito Corleone (Marlon Brando/Doug Abrahams) comforts Aldo, telling him that when he is old enough and the time is right, he will have his revenge. Years later, his mother Sarafina (Sirenetta Leoni) visits Vito during his daughter's wedding, telling him that Aldo has fallen in with a disreputable group of young thieves and requests his help to get him out as a favor for her late husband's loyalty. Vito sends Luca Brasi (Garry Chalk) to find Aldo and recruit him into the family.

After teaching Aldo how to fight and earn protection money, Brasi sends him to meet Paulie Gatto (Tony Alcantar). Aldo helps Gatto and Corleone associate Marty "Monk" Malone (Jason Schombing) take revenge on two men who attacked the daughter of the local undertaker Bonasera, a friend of Vito's. He later goes with Brasi to meet Virgil Sollozzo (Richard Newman), a Tattaglia family-backed drug baron who seeks revenge against Vito for refusing to enter the cocaine trade. Vito has sent Brasi to pretend he is unhappy working for the Corleones and wishes to join the Tattaglia family in order to spy on them. However, Sollozo and Bruno Tattaglia (Joe Paulino) see through Brasi's deception and assist a hired assassin in killing him. After killing Brasi's assassin, Aldo escapes to tell Monk what happened, just as an attempted hit on Vito happens nearby. After being taken to the hospital by Aldo and his son Fredo (Andrew Moxham), Vito appoints his eldest son, Sonny Corleone (James Caan), as acting Don.

At the Corleone compound, Aldo meets caporegimes Peter Clemenza (Doug Abrahams) and Salvatore Tessio (Abe Vigoda) and consigliere Tom Hagen (Robert Duvall). Impressed with Aldo's bravery, Tom promotes him to Enforcer, and Clemenza sends him to guard Vito in the hospital. Whilst there, Aldo meets Monk's sister Frankie (Jennifer Copping), with whom he soon starts a relationship, and Michael Corleone (Joseph May). A Tattaglia hit squad attempts to kill Vito, but Michael gets him to safety while Aldo defends Frankie and kills the assassins. Aldo and Michael are then threatened by corrupt police officers led by Captain Marc McCluskey (Doug Abrahams), who is on Sollozzo's payroll, but Tom arrives and claims that they are private detectives legally employed to guard Vito.

After being promoted to Associate, Aldo kills Gatto for selling Vito out to Sollozzo, and travels to Hollywood to help Corleone soldato Rocco Lampone (Michael Dobson) persuade ill-tempered studio executive Jack Woltz (Doug Abrahams) to give Vito's godson Johnny Fontane the starring role in a new film. Aldo and Rocco decapitate Woltz' prized stallion, and place the head in his bed as he sleeps, terrifying him into giving Fontane the role. After Aldo returns to New York, the Corleones purchase an apartment in Midtown for him and Frankie. Meanwhile, Michael plans to assassinate Sollozzo and McClusky, and arranges a meeting with them, feigning a desire to settle the dispute peacefully. Aldo plants a gun for Michael to use during the assassination, and then drives him to the docks so that he can leave for Sicily. After Vito is released from the hospital, he promotes Aldo to Soldato, making him a made man of the Corleone family.

After Frankie is killed by Tattaglia assassins on Bruno Tattaglia's orders, an enraged Aldo hunts Bruno down with Sonny's help, and eventually murders him. Later, Aldo witnesses Sonny speeding off in his car and follows him, arriving at a highway toll booth where he was ambushed and killed by a Tattaglia hit squad. Aldo kills the hitmen and interrogates their leader, who reveals that the hit was ordered by Don Emilio Barzini (Michael Kopsa). Devastated by Sonny's death and realizing Barzini is controlling most of the other families, Vito meets with the Five Families' heads to secure a peaceful resolution to their feud. In exchange for Michael's safe return to America, Vito promises to withdraw his opposition to their drug business and forgo avenging Sonny's murder.

Vito retires and eventually dies, while Michael becomes the new Don and promotes Aldo to Caporegime. Learning the FBI are investigating the Corleones and have an informant among them, Michael sends Aldo and Monk to a hotel where the informant is meeting with his FBI contact. Monk flees after killing the contact, while Aldo realizes that Monk himself is the informant and notifies Michael. Aldo is subsequently ordered to kill Monk, who, before dying, admits that he blamed the Corleones for Frankie's death and allied with the Cuneo family. Aldo also kills Tessio for setting Michael up to be killed by the Barzini family.

On the day of his nephew's baptism, Michael asks Aldo to assassinate the heads of the four families—Victor Stracci, Carmine Cuneo, Philip Tattaglia, and Emilio Barzini. While Michael attends the ceremony, Aldo carries out each hit with the help of Clemenza, Rocco, Willi Cicci (Gavin Hammon), and Al Neri (Terence McGovern), finally avenging his father's death at Barzini's hands. Michael then promotes Aldo to Underboss. If the player keeps playing at this point, and Aldo bombs all four rival family compounds, he becomes the Don of New York.

== Development ==
=== Early news ===
"Our team feels a great sense of responsibility working on The Godfather. We have seen the film hundreds of times and have read the book many times as well. We are experts in this fiction and are excited about the opportunity to work with this material [...] We have great respect for this fiction, but we don't fear it. We realized early on that we need to be bold enough to take it to where it needs to go in the interactive space. Puzo had this freedom with the book, and Coppola had a similar freedom with the movie. We deserve the opportunity to evolve the fiction for the interactive space--to dare to be bold and make an open- and living-world Godfather experience rather than just making a movie game."

— David De Martini; Executive Producer

The Godfather was first announced by Electronic Arts on March 10, 2004. Speaking at the Bear Stearns Media, Entertainment & Information Conference in Palm Beach, Florida, EA's CFO Warren Jensen confirmed rumors that EA were working on a The Godfather game. No other details were revealed except for the fact that it would "likely be an M-rated game", making it EA's first ever M-rated title. The game was first shown at the 2004 Spike Video Game Awards on December 14. Slated for a third quarter release in 2005 on as yet unspecified current generation systems, EA showed a pre-rendered cutscene depicting Vito Corleone drinking wine, scratching his cheek, and then looking into the camera and saying "Some day, and that day may never come, I may call upon you to do a service for me. But until that day, accept this, as a gift."

Gameplay details remained unknown until January 2005, when Famitsu published an interview with producer Hunter Smith. He revealed the game would be an open world title in the vein of the Grand Theft Auto games, and that, at present, developers EA Redwood Shores had one-hundred-and-twenty staff working full-time on the game, with that number expected to increase to two-hundred in the coming months. He stated that although the game itself was only 15% complete, the narrative was finalized; players would control an original character who begins as a small-time member of the Corleone family, and must work his way up through the ranks. He stated that EA had wanted to make an open-world game for some time; "We wanted to make a title with the same style of open world, but with a strong background, one where you build human relationships while creating your own story." He also explained that the player's progression path through the game could be determined by the player, but would intersect with the plot of the film at certain points, and the player would get to participate in famous scenes from the movie; "It's constructed so that players will appear in the scene and will feel as if they are alive within it."

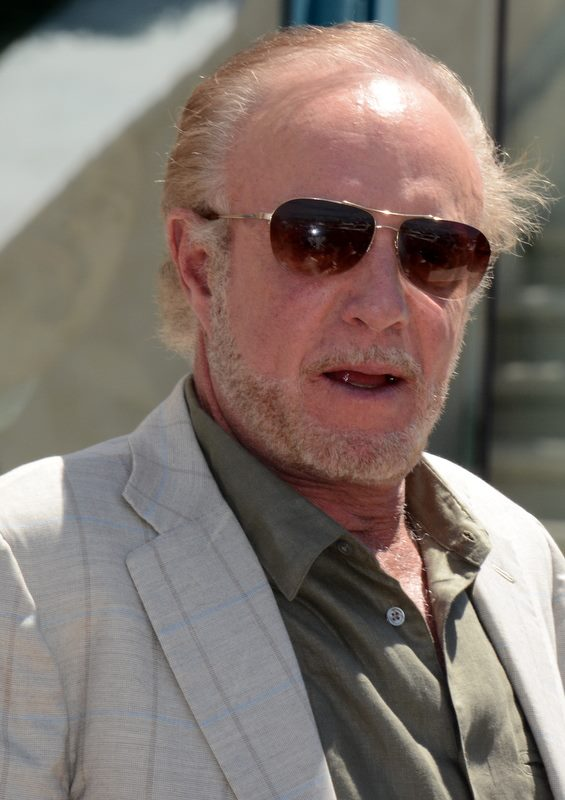
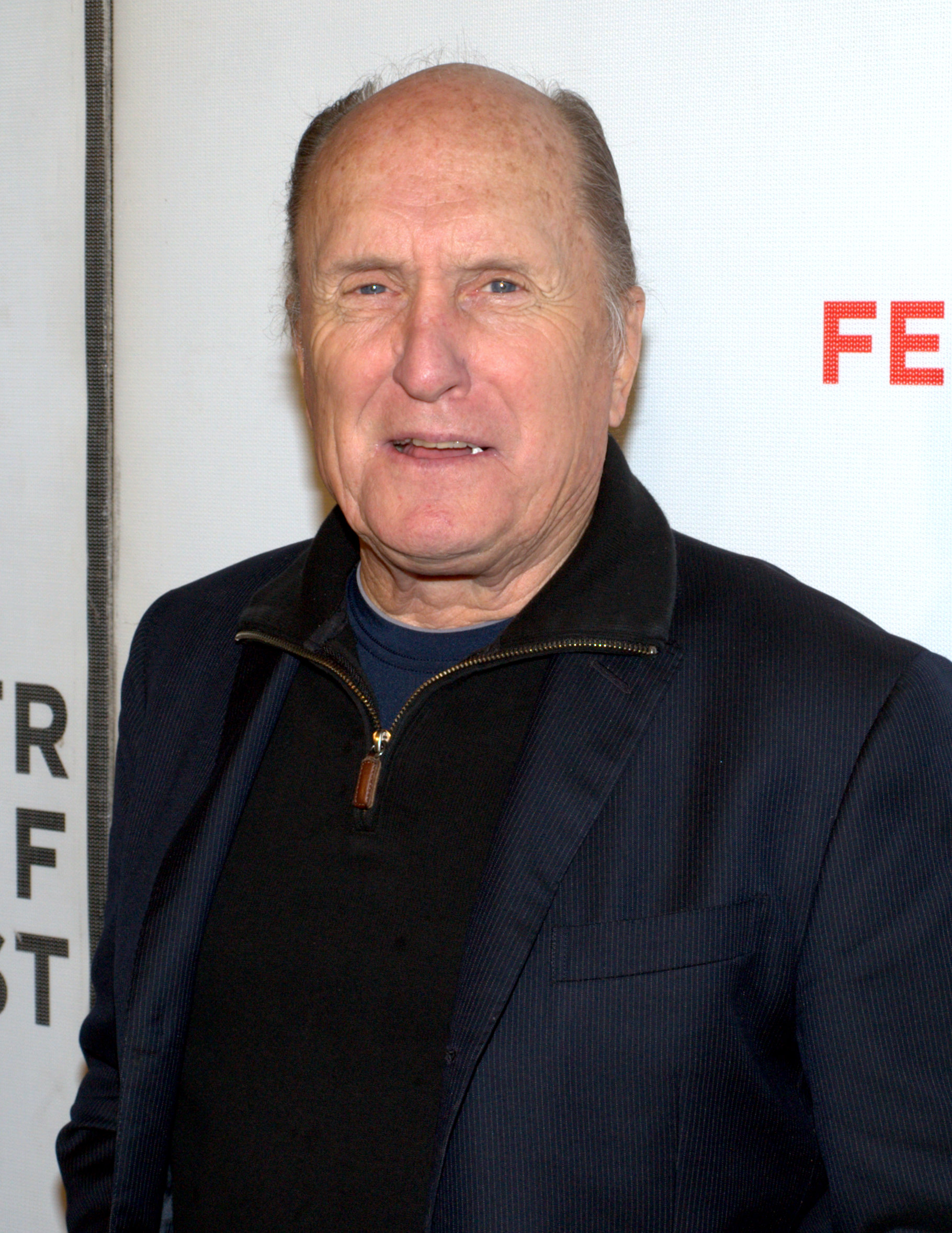
James Caan (left) and Robert Duvall (right) reprised their roles as Sonny Corleone and Tom Hagen in the game.

On February 1, The Hollywood Reporter revealed Marlon Brando, James Caan and Robert Duvall had been hired to reprise their roles as Vito Corleone, Sonny Corleone and Tom Hagen, respectively. All three had also allowed EA to use their likenesses in the game, with both Caan and Duvall doing facial motion capture work. Although Brando had died in July of the previous year, he had recorded dialogue for the game prior to his death, in what was his last acting job. It was also revealed that EA had acquired the rights to Nino Rota's score for the film. Later that same day, EA released its first official statement regarding the game, announcing it was being released for PlayStation 2, Xbox, Windows and PlayStation Portable. Executive producer David De Martini stated "We are incredibly excited and honored to have the opportunity to bring the fiction of The Godfather to life in a video game. The Godfather movies raised the standard for cinematic achievement with their high level of drama and intense storytelling, and in fall 2005 gamers will be able to experience that dangerous and living world of The Godfather for themselves."

The game officially premiered on February 10, in a red carpet event held in Little Italy, with James Caan, Robert Duvall and Johnny Martino (who played Paulie Gatto in the film) in attendance. At the event, it was announced that a playable demo would not be available until the E3 event in May. David De Martini explained the game had already been in development for two years, including a full year of preproduction and research. He revealed the developers had worked closely with Mark Winegardner, author of The Godfather Returns, to ensure the storyline stayed within the canon of the narrative, and maintained the correct tone. De Martini also stated that as well as Rota's score, Bill Conti and Ashley Irwin had composed one-hundred minutes of new music for the game.

=== Open world ===
In the build-up to E3 in May, EA announced the game would also be released for a next-generation platform; the Xbox 360. At the event itself, a playable demo was made available to journalists, but not to the public. The demo debuted the "BlackHand" control system, which had been developed by the inventor of the swing mechanism in the Tiger Woods PGA Tour franchise.

Speaking to GameSpot in June, David De Martini stated the original idea for the project was Paramount's, who first approached EA about a game adaptation of the film in early 2003. After numerous meetings, the concept was decided upon; a "dual-story" game that would feature a character moving through an open world and rising through the ranks of the Corleone family, whilst at the same time, following the plot of the film. De Martini explained

Our approach to this project has been very simple. We set out to make a great open- and living-world game, one that would stand on its own even without the Godfather license. Then, once we had accomplished that mission and made a very innovative game, the plan was to add all the Godfather flavor and texture to make the experience even more memorable.

He stated "We wanted the game to heavily focus on what went on behind the scenes and in the living world. Not the ordering around but rather the actual activities that the order takers had to do on a daily basis to move the family interests forward." He also promised the game would be unlike any other open world game;

We want you to walk the streets and experience the realities of the life that you have created through how you play the game. If you are more violent, the world you live in becomes more violent. If you play in a more balanced way, the streets are more balanced, and people are not as prone to draw guns and shoot. To put it another way, we are creating a world with a memory and a world with consequences. When we push these two dimensions, the world starts to feel alive--it has feelings and becomes more dynamic. Many game makers in this genre set out to create life as we know it and then fall hopelessly short. Our model represents a significant innovation beyond what has shipped to date.

=== Delay and release ===
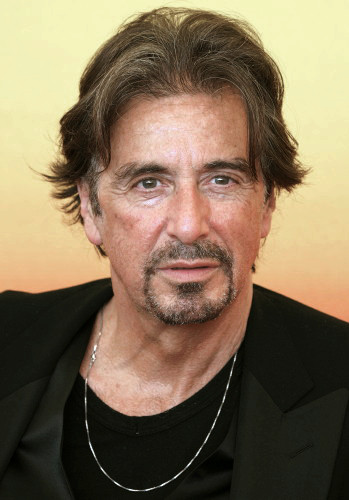
Al Pacino turned down the offer to voice Michael Corleone, and also declined to lend his likeness to the game, instead deciding to lend it to Scarface: The World Is Yours.

In July, The New York Times reported that Marlon Brando would not be voicing all of Vito Corleone's dialogue. Although Brando did record dialogue prior to his death, "his actual voice will not appear in the game [...] rather, his recordings are guiding a professional voice mimic." The article claimed that Brando's ailing health meant he could only breathe with the aid of an oxygen tank, the noise of which was picked up on the audio recordings, making them unusable in the game. After publication of the article, EA confirmed "we recorded multiple sessions with a sound-alike to capture the entire performance of the Don Vito character, something we were not able to do with Mr. Brando." However, they hoped that some of his audio may still make it into the game. Although it was already known that Al Pacino had turned down the opportunity to voice Michael Corleone, the article also revealed he had refused to lend his likeness to the game. Instead, Pacino had allowed Radical Entertainment to use his likeness for their upcoming game for Sierra Entertainment, Scarface: The World Is Yours.

On July 13, EA announced the game would also be ported to the Wii. Although they revealed no further information, they did state the port would be custom built to take advantage of the Wii Remote. The following day, they announced the initial release of the game had been pushed to March 2006 so as to "ensure quality". De Martini explained "The Godfather is one of the most cherished franchises in entertainment. Releasing the game in early 2006 allows us more time to perfect the open-world experience of being a member of the Corleone family."

In January 2006, speaking to GameSpot, De Martini said of the delay, "When you are dealing with a property like The Godfather, you have to take special care in making sure your work meets the level fans have come to expect from the franchise. With this fiction in our game, we had to hit a home run. I am tremendously thankful that EA gave our team the time we needed to get it right. I think it turned a good game into a great one."

In an interview with IGN, he further explained,

Last year when we were looking at the November window, we realized we were going to make compromises in quality that we didn't find acceptable. When that was made clear to us, based on schedules and other things, we had a long discussion on this side with regard to what would be the appropriate thing to do with this particular license, this particular property, this particular game, and when we shook all of that out, it was just too important for us to get this right. To risk something that's going to be good, instead of something that's great. I mean, when you're dealing with The Godfather, so many people have so many expectations of what you're going to deliver it's critically important that you pick a vision for that project and you stay on that vision.

On January 18, EA confirmed the PlayStation 2, Xbox and Windows versions would be released in March, with the PSP and Xbox 360 versions scheduled for later in the year. On January 26, it was announced that the game would release in North America on March 21, 2006. The game went gold on March 14. The game was also released in Australia on March 23, 2006, and in Europe on March 24, 2006.

=== Francis Ford Coppola's reaction ===
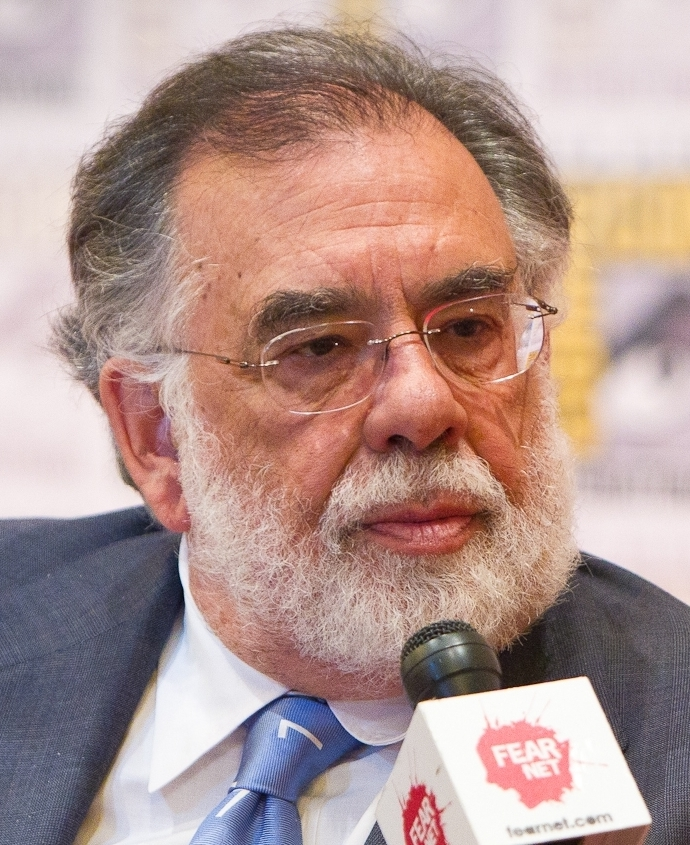
Francis Ford Coppola was unimpressed with the game, and claimed Paramount did not consult him about its development.

In April 2005, Francis Ford Coppola, director of the three Godfather films, was asked about the game on AMC's Sunday Morning Shootout. He responded,

I knew nothing about it. [Paramount] never asked me if I thought it was a good idea. I went and I took a look at what it was. What they do is they use the characters everyone knows and they hire those actors to be there and only to introduce very minor characters. And then for the next hour they shoot and kill each other. I had absolutely nothing to do with the game and I disapprove. I think it's a misuse of film.

However, the game's executive producer, David De Martini, implied Coppola did know about the game well in advance of its development, stating,

We met with him on one occasion and we shared with him what our vision was for the game, and where we were going to go. He isn't choosing to participate in the project, but he did invite us up to the Coppola winery where he has his own private library. He's got a lot of materials from the original Godfather productions - so a lot of sketch designs for the sets, for the costumes, a lot of notes that he's taken in the original screenplay as well as in the book. He invited us up there to take a look around, and we sent four or five people for a week.

=== Puzo lawsuit ===
In June 2008, Anthony Puzo, son of author Mario Puzo, sued Paramount Pictures, claiming that a 1992 agreement between his father and Paramount entitled the author (or, as Mario had died in 1999, his estate) to a share of the profits generated from any audio-visual products based on or using elements of the films or novels. The court filing stated, "In material breach of the audio-visual products agreement, Paramount has failed and refused to pay the Puzo Estate the sums due it in respect of the Godfather game." In February 2009, Puzo won the suit, with Paramount paying out an undisclosed sum, thought to be in the region of several million dollars.

=== Ports and adaptations ===
==== PlayStation Portable ====
The PlayStation Portable version of the game was announced on February 1, 2005, alongside the PlayStation 2, Xbox and Windows versions. Originally scheduled for release with the other versions in Q4 2005, and then rescheduled for March 2006, the game was ultimately released in September 2006. There was no indication the PSP version would be a different game until July 11, 2006, when Electronics Boutique and GameStop changed their listing from simply The Godfather to The Godfather: Mob Wars, although there was no change in the game's content description on either website. The following day, EA confirmed the PSP version would indeed be called Mob Wars and would not be the same game as the PlayStation 2, Xbox and Windows versions.

At a press event on July 13, 2006, EA debuted Mob Wars. The main difference between this version and the others is that Mob Wars does not feature an open-world environment in which the player is free to move around and extort whatever businesses they wish. Instead, the game features two distinct game modes; "Story Mode" and "Mob Wars". The "Mob Wars" mode replaces the open world element from the other versions of the game and is played from a top down view in which the player moves units in a turn-based strategy fashion, attempting to capture space owned by the rival families. An important element in this is a card battling mini-game which features a pool of over two-hundred cards with effects such as lowering vendetta levels, strengthening defenses, and allowing extra moves in a given turn.

For "Story Mode", the game switches to a 3D third-person perspective similar to that of the other versions, with the same lock-on system, and shooting and grappling mechanics. In "Mob Wars" mode, each turn has three phases; "Recruiting", "Negotiation", and "Intimidation". "Recruiting" allows the player to hire guards to protect already owned territory. "Negotiation" allows the player to select which cards they wish to use. "Intimidation" sees the player moving their units around the map, attempting to extort rival businesses. The player is free to play through "Story Mode" without playing "Mob Wars", or to play "Mob Wars" as much as they wish between missions in "Story Mode". Like in the other versions of the game, businesses taken over in "Mob Wars" yield money, which can be used to purchase better weaponry for use in "Story Mode". Like in the open world environment of the other versions of the game, to completely defeat a rival family, the player must destroy their compound. Also as in the other versions of the game, to finish the game to 100%, the player must complete all story missions in "Story Mode", and successfully extort all businesses, rackets, warehouses and hubs, and destroy all compounds in "Mob Wars" mode.

==== Xbox 360 ====
Originally announced on May 12, 2005, the Xbox 360 version was named The Godfather. Initially scheduled for a March 2006 release, when the PlayStation 2, Xbox and PC versions were pushed back from Fall 2005 to March 2006, the Xbox 360 and PSP versions were pushed back to September. Regarding the delay, executive producer David De Martini explained "The 360 version of the game will be released later this year, and we will be using the time between our March ship and the 360 version ship to take full advantage of the hardware with some key design modifications that will make the game rock on that platform."

"The graphics enhancements to the Xbox 360 really serve two functions: to add visual variety to support the added gameplay; and to better immerse the gamer in the Godfather universe of New York City circa 1950. By taking advantage of the capabilities of the platform we have been able to add significant detail to the world and to create a dynamic quality that supports the dynamic new gameplay [...] Gamers will immediately notice the rich vibrancy and dynamic quality of the world. The first glance up Mott Street or the Bowery in Little Italy will reveal a much higher level of visual density [...] We've touched virtually every surface in the game, increasing texture resolution and adding shaders to the cars, the streets and sidewalks, storefronts, rivers, and more."

— Mark Lohff; Art manager

The game was first shown at an EA press event on July 13, 2006. Designer Mike Olsen explained the 360 version "is 100% of the game on the Xbox, plus some." Graphically, the game features dynamic weather and diurnal cycles, and an enhanced particle system. All of the rackets feature new textures and geographical layouts, so they no longer all look the same, and each of the rival family compounds is completely different, with bomb locations different from compound to compound. In terms of gameplay, the game adds a favor system whereby rather than intimidating shop owners, the player can carry out favors for them. The player can also carry out favors for family members, in much the same way as they can carry out hits. A major addition to the game is the ability for the player to hire Corleone soldiers to join Aldo in combat. This can involve individually hiring a single family member, or hiring a crew of four men who accompany the player everywhere until they are dismissed or killed. Individual crew members cost different amounts, but the more expensive they are, the better they fight. A full crew can only be hired periodically; when a meter on the HUD is full. The game also features new story missions, such as rescuing Tom Hagen from Sollozzo, bombing Sollozzo's drug factories, and assassinating Moe Greene. The aiming system has also been tweaked, and the melee combat system has had additional combat moves added. Twenty-six new execution styles have also been added to the twenty-two existing ones.

In an interview with IGN, art manager Mark Lohff stated

We've added dynamic terrain shadowing and character self-shadowing, which help to place the player firmly in the environment as well as to give the world a more "living" quality. Shadows creeping across the city streets as nighttime descends portend new opportunities and challenges. Attempt to take down a racket at the wrong time of day or night and you might miss the rival mobsters hiding in the shadows of a nearby alley. Weather is another new living world addition for Xbox 360. Rolling thunder signals a coming storm, followed by gathering clouds, flashes of lightning and a cloudburst that can be a drizzle or a downpour.

Creative director Michael Perry stated

The Xbox 360 gave us a lot of power to amp up the Godfather experience to make a true HD Living World. Not only did we improve every aspect of the world graphics, including texture sizes, more building details, glass reflections, and bullet damage, but we also improved the "living" elements. This means that we were able to double the world population and give each neighborhood its own style of demographics. For instance, in Midtown, the streets are bustling, but in New Jersey, the streets are less crowded. We did the same with cars, where we added six new vehicles to the world, and some only exist in certain neighborhoods. We also made the cycle between day and night much more distinct. Between the sunsets and sunrises, the demographics of the game change, with nightlife clubbers coming out at night in Midtown, and some dangerous characters walking the streets of Hell's Kitchen.

==== Wii ====
Originally announced on July 13, 2005, nothing further was heard about the Wii version until January 10, 2006, when GameFly listed the game under the title The Godfather: Blackhand Edition. The following day, EA confirmed this title. They also announced the Wii version would feature all of the graphical and gameplay enhancements of the Xbox 360 version. New to the Wii edition would be an enhanced upgrade system which allowed the player to spend their upgrade points on more specific attributes. The game would allow for two upgrade paths - "Enforcer" and "Operator". Enforcer would concentrate on fighting and shooting skills, whilst Operator would feature monetary enhancements, intimidation aids and health upgrades. The Wii version would also feature an enhanced "BlackHand" control system making use of the Wii Remote's unique capabilities. The Don's Edition for PlayStation 3 and Blackhand Edition for Wii were both released nearly one year after the Windows, PlayStation 2, and Xbox versions in North America on March 20, 2007, and in Europe on March 23, 2007.

In an interview with IGN, Joel Wade, producer of the Wii and PlayStation 3 versions, stated

The biggest difference is how we use the Wii controls to immerse players in combat. On other platforms, the Blackhand fighting system is a Fight Night style control scheme built for mobsters; on Wii, our team decided to make it like REAL brawling. You'll be able to throw left and right hand jabs, hooks, and uppercuts; grab enemies and throw them around with both hands; perform headbutts and neck-snaps. We had so much fun with the controller possibilities that we mo-capped a bunch of exclusive moves to fit some of the gestures we'd developed, like the open-handed smack and pistol whip. At the end of the day, we want players to feel like the Wii controller was designed with The Godfather in mind!

The Blackhand Edition uses both the Wii Remote and the Nunchuk; if an enemy is on their knees, the player can pull the controllers upwards to lift them off the ground. Similarly, swinging the controllers from side to side swings an enemy around. Melee combat is similar to Wii Sports Boxing - the player throws the type of punch they want Aldo to throw. Slamming enemies against walls is accomplished by shoving the controllers towards the screen, and head-butts by quickly raising them upwards. The remote can also be used for executions (which require specific gestures), for opening doors, and for reloading weapons. For example, to reload a shotgun, the player must move the Nunchuk upwards and then quickly downwards to mimic the pump action of the weapon, and to reload a revolver, the player must flick the Nunchuk as if emptying the cylinder.

==== PlayStation 3 ====
Released on the same day in March 2007 as the Wii version, and developed alongside it, the PlayStation 3 version was the last version of the game announced, and was not revealed until January 10, 2007, when GameFly listed it under the title The Godfather: The Don's Edition. The following day, EA confirmed the game would be coming to PlayStation 3 under this title, with all the graphical and gameplay enhancements of both the Xbox 360 version and the Wii version (including the deeper upgrade system). In a statement, EA said the Don's Edition would "take full advantage" of the Sixaxis controller's motion sensor, and would also feature added gameplay in the form of "The Corleone Expansion Pack".

The Don's Edition features a more basic form of the gesture-based BlackHand control scheme seen in the Wii version. The game uses the SIXAXIS' motion sensor functionality in interrogations and, to a limited degree, during melee combat. As in the Wii, if the player wishes to lift someone from their knees, they simply pull the controller upwards. Swinging the controller from side to side swings the enemy likewise. Slamming someone against a wall is accomplished by pushing the controller away from the player. Unlike in the Wii version, however, where shooting and driving were handled using the Wii Remote, in The Don's Edition, shooting and driving are controlled using the analog sticks.

Unique to The Don's Edition are the "Corleone challenges". These are time based minigames that have no effect on the story. The player must see how much of a certain action they can accomplish in a given time - such as how many different execution styles they can perform, how many banks they can rob, or many businesses they can extort etc. When the game first came out, the player's scores were uploaded to an online leaderboard. EA shut down their servers for the game on April 13, 2012, meaning players can no longer upload their scores. However, the mini-games are still playable.

== Reception ==
Reception

Aggregate score
Aggregator	Score						
Aggregator	PC	PS2	PS3	PSP	Wii	Xbox	Xbox 360
Metacritic	72/100	75/100	70/100	59/100	77/100	77/100	77/100

Review scores
Publication	Score						
Publication	PC	PS2	PS3	PSP	Wii	Xbox	Xbox 360
Eurogamer					7/10	6/10	6/10
Game Informer		7.5/10	7.5/10	4.5/10	6.5/10		7.75/10
GameSpot	8.1/10	8.1/10	7.6/10	6/10	7.6/10	8.1/10	7.9/10
GameSpy	3/5	3.5/5	3/5	3/5	3.5/5	3.5/5	4/5
IGN	7.9/10	7.9/10	7.5/10	6.2/10	8/10	7.9/10	7.9/10
Nintendo Power					8/10		
PlayStation Official Magazine – UK			2/5				
Official U.S. PlayStation Magazine		4/5		3/5			
Official Xbox Magazine (US)						6.5/10	7/10
PC Gamer (US)	73%						

Award
Publication	Award
Game Audio Network Guild Awards	"Best Arrangement of a Non-Original Score" (2007)

The Godfather received "generally favorable reviews" on all systems except the PlayStation Portable, which received "mixed or average reviews". The Xbox version holds an aggregate scores of 77 out of 100 on Metacritic, based on fifty-eight reviews; the Wii version 77 out of 100, based on thirty-eight reviews; the PlayStation 2 version 75 out of 100, based on fifty-six reviews; the Xbox 360 version 77 out of 100, based on fifty-one reviews; the PC version 72 out of 100, based on thirty-two reviews; the PlayStation 3 version 70 out of 100, based on thirty-one reviews; and the PlayStation Portable version 59 out of 100, based on thirty-four reviews.

=== PC, PlayStation 2 and Xbox ===
GameSpot's Greg Mueller scored the PC, PlayStation 2 and Xbox versions 8.1 out of 10, calling the game "a satisfying, lengthy adventure", and arguing "it remains faithful to the classic film while managing to create a compelling story of its own [...] it handles the source material respectfully and manages to offer enough new content to feel like more than just a by-the-numbers adaptation of the movie." IGN's Douglass C. Perry scored the PC, PlayStation 2 and Xbox versions 7.9 out of 10, with the Xbox version finishing as runner-up in the March 2006 "Xbox Game of the Month" award, losing to Far Cry Instincts: Evolution. Perry praised the concept of placing a new character in the existing narrative; "Much of the story is carefully untarnished, so when you see pivotal scenes, they will be left relatively untouched. You'll hear and see these key scenes unfolding in front of you, but you'll be in the house, the car, the church, or the hospital as a close associate, rather than a bystander. You'll feel like an insider who's part of a great powerful narrative, and the feeling is eerily remarkable." Although he was critical of the melee combat and the driving portions of the game, he called the extortion system "awesome fun". He concluded, "people looking for a perfect game will be disappointed [but] there are elements that totally stand out from any similar games in this genre, from the extortion system to the business take-over model. Despite obvious areas in need of improvement, I had a blast playing The Godfather." GameSpy's Will Tuttle scored the PlayStation 2 and Xbox versions 3.5 out of 5. Praising the use of the license, he wrote "the game is best viewed as a complementary addition to the Godfather universe," calling it "an ultimately entertaining sandbox game that doesn't really do much to help or hurt the license."

Game Informer's Andrew Reiner scored the PlayStation 2 version 7.5 out of 10, writing "while failing to transform the classic film into an engrossing interactive experience, the game does shine when it doesn't have to rely on the film license to pull it along." GameSpy's William Abner scored the PC version 3 out of 5, and was critical of the use of the license; "where the original movie was full of political intrigue, wicked subplots and occasional gratuitous violence, the game is all about the violence." He wrote "Being a Godfather game, you'd expect things to be a bit less "insane" than your run-of-the-mill Grand Theft Auto clone. But there's more gunplay, more Blues Brothers-inspired car chases, and more thuggery in general, in 30 minutes of the game than in the entire movie trilogy." He concluded "if you can think of it as a generic gangland-themed game without constantly comparing it to the films it borrows its license from, you can certainly have a good time. That said, it's hard to play The Godfather without thinking that this was a missed opportunity." Eurogamer's Kristan Reed scored the Xbox version 6 out of 10, calling it "way too short, far too easy, too damned repetitive and far too in awe of Grand Theft Auto to be held up as anything other than a rather lightweight copycat offering." Although he was critical of the length of the game's story in relation to the extortion gameplay, he felt the combat went some way to redeeming the game; "the one main saving grace is that the combat is actually fun enough to nullify the overwhelming repetition". He argued the game "offers a decent amount of fun, with great combat, occasionally inspired set-pieces, but sub-par driving and a half-baked story mode with barely enough variety to fill a long evening".

=== PlayStation Portable ===
IGN's Chris Roper scored Mob Wars 6.2 out of 10, writing "there are a number of areas where the ball was dropped". He was mildly impressed with the card gameplay, but felt it wasn't enough to "help the game rise above mediocrity". He called the game "an interesting idea, but it doesn't feel cohesive enough or like either part was pushed as far as it could go." GameSpot's Greg Mueller scored it 6 out of 10. He too was more impressed with Mob Wars mode than Story Mode, writing "it sounds like the makings of an experiment gone awry, like some sort of Frankenstein's monster of game design, but it's actually playable--and even fun." However, he called the connection between Story Mode and Mob Wars "tenuous and disjointed". He concluded "Mob Wars doesn't live up to its potential. There are some flashes of a good game in there, and you might have fun for the first couple of hours, but unfortunately that enjoyment is fleeting, and you'll be left feeling aggravated and disappointed."

GameSpy's Justin Speer scored it 3 out of 5. He too was critical of the connection between Story Mode and Mob Wars, and concluded "it can't hold itself together well enough to deliver a really satisfying game experience." Game Informer's Andrew Reiner scored it 4.5 out of 10, stating "Electronic Arts couldn't quite get The Godfather to run correctly on the PSP, but that didn't stop them from releasing it. Applying cement shoes to the experience, [EA have] stripped all of the open world gameplay from this version, leaving nothing but the lame missions and a putrid Risk-like minigame."

=== Xbox 360 ===
GameSpy's David Chapman scored the Xbox 360 version 4 out of 5, calling it "definitely the version to pick up". GameSpot's Greg Mueller scored it 7.9 out of 10, writing "for the most part, this is the same game that was released six months earlier". IGN's Douglass C. Perry also scored it 7.9 out of 10, calling it "essentially the same game with minor visual and gameplay upgrades. If you played the current-gen version, this plays exactly the same, but every so often you'll see or experience a surprising little tweak." He concluded "EA upgraded a bunch of little things and improved the overall experience. But gamers have higher expectations for next-generation titles, and The Godfather looks and plays exactly like what it is: a good upgraded current-gen game."

Game Informer's Matt Helgeson scored it 7.75 out of 10, calling it "still the same flawed game that was released for the current-gen systems". Eurogamer's Kristan Reed scored it 6 out of 10, writing "the changes and improvements are so minor that you might not have noticed them were they not written down for you. Tellingly, none of them really address the fundamental gripes that dragged the game down in the first place." He was critical of the graphics, arguing "the game looks like a port from the word go. The low-poly character models, stilted animation and bland texture detail of the original is exposed even more once you see it running in high def." He concluded "the core of The Godfather can be quite harmlessly entertaining. Like so many openworld games, there's a moreishness to it that keeps you going even when so many alarm bells are ringing about where EA went wrong. But let's face it, The Godfather should have been far better than it is."

=== Wii and PlayStation 3 ===
IGN's Mark Bozon scored the Wii version 8 out of 10. It would go on to win the March 2007 "Wii Game of the Month" award. Bozon wrote "it incorporates a ton of great actions with the Wii controller, is one of the better looking games on the system, and actually banks on the system's strong points." Of the controls, he wrote "after playing it on Wii I really can't see people wanting to go back to the traditional controls." Eurogamer's Richard Leadbetter scored it 7 out of 10, writing "While most of the gameplay flaws inherent in the previous versions are still there in this new version, there are a number of factors that may make this far more appealing to the average Wii owner [...] this is generally a decent, well-thought out and enjoyable conversion." Game Informer's Andrew Reiner scored it 6.5 out of 10, writing "the redeveloped skill tree is a step in the right direction, but the sloppy motion-based combat and IR targeting make the game even more painful than it was on the other machines."

IGN's Chris Roper scored the PlayStation 3 version 7.5 out of 10, calling it "certainly the best version of the bunch". Of the controls, he wrote "it doesn't feel as rewarding or "realistic" as EA would have liked. Really, it just feels like you're suggesting what should happen and then hoping it does." He was also critical of the graphics; "its visuals are simply poor for a next-generation title. Other than the high-definition output, it doesn't look like anything has been noticeably changed. Texture resolution is pretty bad, some of the effects are very last-gen and it really does look like you're playing a PS2 game in HD." He concluded "the game is a strong and rather noticeable improvement over the original release, though much of it does feel outdated on the PlayStation 3. EA has done a great job of expanding nearly every facet of the game, [but] with last-gen visuals, a frustrating city layout and other issues that plagued the original release, it's still far from perfect." Game Informer's Matt Helgeson also scored it 7.5 out of 10, writing "it still doesn't solve the problems I have with the game as a whole, which remain largely the same." He concluded "The Godfather's uninspired craftsmanship falls short of being a truly compelling game experience."

Greg Mueller from GameSpot scored both versions 7.6 out of 10. Of the controls, he wrote "at times the movements don't seem to register properly unless you use exaggerated gestures." GameSpy's Patrick Joynt scored the PlayStation 3 version 3 out of 5 and the Wii version 3.5 out of 5, and was critical of the game's use of its license; "Sickening bloodlust and a fondness for repetition are essential skills for enjoying The Godfather, placing an otherwise decent open-world game at direct odds with its own license and identity." However, he also felt that "once you get over the disconnect of the license and the gameplay, the missions are plentiful and entertaining". He concluded "a licensed game doesn't need to be slavishly adhered to the property it's coming from. And the actual gameplay here isn't half-bad. But like slapping the word "art" on a toilet, there's a constant dissonance between the license and the gameplay."

=== Sales and awards ===
The Godfather sold well across all platforms. In the first week of the game's North American release, the PlayStation 2 version was Blockbuster's top rental title, with the Xbox version coming in second. Together, the two titles rented more copies than the rest of the top ten combined. During its first three months on release, the game sold over one million units across PlayStation 2, Xbox and PC. In the game's first week on release in the UK, it entered the charts at No. 1, knocking The Elder Scrolls IV: Oblivion from the top spot. It remained in the top ten chart for eight weeks. By 2008, the game sold more than 4 million units.

At the 2006 Spike Video Game Awards, the game received three nominations; "Best Game Based on a Movie or TV Show", "Best Supporting Male Performance" (James Caan as Sonny Corleone) and "Best Cast". It lost in the first category to Lego Star Wars II: The Original Trilogy, Caan lost to James Gandolfini for The Sopranos: Road to Respect, and "Best Cast" went to Family Guy Video Game! At the 2007 Game Audio Network Guild (G.A.N.G.) Awards, composers Ashley Irwin and Bill Conti won the award for "Best Arrangement of a Non-Original Score".
