= The Godfather II (video game) =

2009 video game

- Developer: EA Redwood Shores
- Publisher: Electronic Arts
- Producer: Joel Wade
- Designers: Mike Olsen; Michael Perry; John Calhoun
- Programmer: Colin Boswell
- Artists: John Bell; Meagan Carabetta
- Composer: Christopher Lennertz
- Series: The Godfather
- Platforms: Microsoft Windows; PlayStation 3; Xbox 360
- Release: NA: April 7, 2009; EU: April 10, 2009
- Genre: Action-adventure
- Modes: Single-player, multiplayer

The Godfather II is a 2009 action-adventure game developed by EA Redwood Shores and published by Electronic Arts. It was released for Microsoft Windows, PlayStation 3, and Xbox 360 in April. Based on the 1974 film The Godfather Part II, it is the sequel to the 2006 game The Godfather, which was based on the 1972 film of the same name. Like the first game, The Godfather II follows a non-canon character, Dominic, who is initially the protégé and underboss of the original game's protagonist, Aldo Trapani. After Aldo is killed, Dominic is placed in charge of the Corleone family's operations in New York City and tasked with expanding the Corleone empire by taking out their rivals. Unlike the first game, which was primarily set in New York, the story also spans Miami and Havana.

Like its predecessor, The Godfather II tells an original story, which intersects with the narrative of the film on multiple occasions. However, the game changes the film's plot more so than the first game did: none of the material concerning the rise of Vito Corleone is present in the game, and the events of the film are presented in a different order. Additionally, whereas in the first game, most of Aldo's actions took the form of events which happened off-screen in the first film, in The Godfather II, Dominic has a more central role, appearing in numerous scenes in which he was not present in the film; for example, he is with Frank Pentangeli during his attempted assassination, he accompanies Tom Hagen to see Pat Geary after the prostitute is found dead, and he kills Hyman Roth and Fredo Corleone. Unlike the first game, which featured many of the film's actors reprising their roles, only Robert Duvall returned as Tom Hagen, while the rest of the cast comprises entirely new actors.

The Godfather II received mixed reviews across all platforms. Common criticisms included graphical glitches, technical bugs, poor AI, and an unimaginative open world design. Many critics also felt the game deviated too much from both the plot and tone of the film, and that it was too easy and too short. It was a commercial failure, selling less than 400,000 units worldwide across all platforms. Its poor critical and commercial performance led EA to scrap plans for an adaptation of the third Godfather film.

== Gameplay ==
The Godfather II is an action-adventure and role-playing game played from a third-person perspective, in which the player controls Dominic, an original character created for the game, who becomes the Don of the Corleone family in New York City, and Michael Corleone's underboss. The basic gameplay and game mechanics fall into the subgenre of Grand Theft Auto clones, as the player can travel throughout the game world freely, commandeer vehicles, do whatever they want in terms of attacking and/or killing innocent civilians, and progress through the storyline at their own leisure, spending as much time traversing the city as they wish.

=== Combat ===
Basic gameplay in The Godfather II. The HUD shows the mini-map on the bottom right, Dominic's currently selected weapon and ammo on the bottom left, his health, and funds on the top left, and his currently targeted opponent's health on the top right. Below his own health bar are the health bars of his made men, as well as icons indicating their specialties.

Much of the game is based around third-person shooting, with the player able to wield a pistol, a magnum, a tommy gun, a shotgun, and a sniper rifle, as well as projectiles such as molotov cocktails and dynamite. The game features both a lock-on system and a manual aiming system. In the manual system, the player has complete freedom to aim wherever they wish. In the lock-on system, the player can lock onto a target, but still has a certain degree of freedom to aim manually; the targeting reticule can be moved around the locked on target, allowing the player to target specific areas. If the reticule turns red, the player has found a weak point. All enemies have four weak points - their two knees and their two shoulders. If the player shoots one of their knees, the enemy will no longer be able to run, but will continue to shoot back. If the player hits a shoulder, the enemy won't be able to fire back or fight.

The other mode of combat in the game is melee combat, which is very similar to the "BlackHand" system used in the first game. Once the player has locked onto an NPC, either hostile or non-hostile, they can use the right analog stick or the shoulder buttons to engage in melee combat. The system allows for light attacks, heavy attacks, powered attacks, and directional attacks. It also allows the player to swing the opponent around, drag them, strangle them, lift them to their feet if they fall to their knees, slam them against walls, smash their head against counters, throw them over ledges and out windows, and perform execution maneuvers when the opponent is suitably weakened. Players can also wield numerous melee weapons, such as baseball bats, tire irons, police batons, and snooker cues.

=== Extortion and family ===
A major part of The Godfather II's gameplay is extorting businesses. When the player is attempting to intimidate a business owner into paying protection money, a meter appears on screen with two red bars. To get the owner to agree to pay, the player must intimidate them until the meter fills up to the first bar. After this point, the more intimidation the player can achieve, the more money the owner will pay out. However, if the meter passes the second red bar, the owner will begin to fight back and will refuse to pay anything. Every business owner has a weak point, something they particularly fear, and if the player finds it, the amount of money paid out will rise faster than the meter fills, allowing the player to extort more money before the meter reaches the second red bar. Intimidation methods include beating the owner up, throwing them around, smashing their shop, hanging them off ledges, attacking customers, or pointing firearms at them.

A new element of gameplay in The Godfather II is "Crime Rings". Every business is part of a larger multi-business crime ring, and once the player has taken over every business in a given crime ring, they receive a gameplay bonus. For example, taking over every business in a diamond smuggling ring will give all members of the player's family bulletproof vests, taking over all businesses in a drug ring will double the player's income from each individual extorted business, taking over all businesses in a chop shop ring will give the player access to armored vehicles, etc. However, these bonuses are also available to any rival family who controls the crime ring, until the player takes over any single business within the ring, then the bonus disappears. For either the player or a rival family to receive the crime ring bonus, they must control every business in the crime ring, but to lose the bonus, they need lose only one business. To ensure the player does not lose extorted businesses, they must assign guards. Every business the player has extorted is open to attack from rival families, and if the business is unguarded, it will be lost. If a rival family successfully takes back a business, they will break the crime ring, and the player will lose their bonus.

Ultimately, the player must tackle the rival family's strongest holdout - their compound. Once the compound is destroyed, that family has been defeated. To destroy a compound, the player must first unlock it by taking over all of the family's businesses. They must then fight their way inside and plant a bomb. Each compound is heavily guarded by opposing family members.

Another new gameplay aspect in The Godfather II is the squad mechanic, whereby the player can directly command a group of made men. Each made man has one or more special skills; "Arsonist" (can set fire to various locations), "Demolitions" (can rig bombs on cars and buildings), "Bruiser" (can smash certain locked doors and perform stealth kills on enemies), "Safecracker" (can open safes and certain locked doors), "Engineer" (can cut through fences and deactivate communications in enemy businesses, meaning they cannot call for backup) and "Medic" (can revive Dominic and other made men if their health is reduced to zero during combat). When a made man is hired, they start at the lowest rank; soldato. A total of four soldato can be hired, with the player able to promote two to the rank of capo, thus leaving room to hire two more soldato. When a made man is promoted to capo, they are granted an additional special skill, and become more powerful. The player can also promote one capo to the rank of underboss, giving him another special skill and further enhancing his strength. Although the player can have a total of seven made-men working for him, only three can be active in his crew at any one time. The inactive men can be sent to guard businesses or attack rival businesses.

Don's View in The Godfather II. In this image, the player has selected "Basso Oil Fill & Go". The information on the left indicates that this business is part of a gun smuggling crime ring which, if the player owns all businesses within it, will grant access to larger ammo clips.

To manage their crime rings, and get an overview of their empire, players have access to a semi-interactive map called the "Don's View." Presented in a 3D perspective, with a rotatable/zoomable isometric three-quarter top-down view, the Don's View allows players to examine rival businesses to see how many guards are present, select the number of guards to place at their own businesses, send family members to bomb or try to take over a rival business, set waypoints, organize their own family, manage their finances, upgrade Dominic's skills, promote and fire made men, and examine collectibles.

=== Heat and favors ===
As in the first game, the player must be aware of "heat" at all times. Shooting rival family members in public, killing innocent people, or attacking police officers will all raise heat levels. If the level gets too high, police will fire upon the player on sight. To avoid this, the player can bribe police to ignore them for a while. The game also introduces witnesses. When the player commits a crime, a yellow circle appears on the mini-map. This is the crime scene, and police will soon arrive to investigate. On occasion, a member of the public will be willing to identify the player to the police. If this happens when the player is still within the yellow circle, the police will attack. To avoid this, the player can either intimidate or bribe witnesses into not talking before the police arrive on the scene.

Another new aspect of The Godfather II is the favor system. Players can do favors for ordinary people on the street either for money or for information on how to assassinate rival family made men. Like the Corleone family, all of the other families have made men. If the player simply shoots a made man, he will be hospitalized, not killed. To permanently eliminate a made man, the player must meet his "kill condition"; that is, he must be killed in a specific way, such as being thrown from the roof of a building, hit by a car or killed using a certain execution maneuver. The only way the player can learn these kill conditions, and the location of each made man, is by doing favors for people on the street. The player can also do favors for various influential people, such as police chiefs, politicians, CIA agents, judges and DAs. Doing favors for these people grants the player bonuses which they can cash in at any time. These bonuses include instantly reducing heat to zero, instantly healing hospitalized made men, putting enemy made men in prison for a time, and instantly rebuilding bombed businesses.

=== Multiplayer ===
In online multiplayer, players do not control Dominic, but one of his made men from single-player mode. Multiplayer can support up to sixteen players in eight-versus-eight man teams. However, the abilities of the made man are important to the type of game mode, although there is also a standard deathmatch mode. Other modes are "Firestarter" (which is designed with the arsonist in mind, where players gain bonuses by starting fires), "Safecracker" (designed for safecrackers, where players must open and then defend a safe from the other team), and "Demo Assault" (where demolition experts must destroy pre-designated targets in their opponents base). Additionally, each time the player uses one of their skills, they gain in-game cash. If a player uses their made man's skill enough times in a game, they gain honors, which can be used to unlock new weapons in both multiplayer and single-player modes. All cash acquired in multiplayer is also carried over to single-player mode.

== Plot ==
"The first person I ever called Godfather was Vito Corleone. I only met him a couple of times. I was only a soldier for the family back then. Times were tough, we were at war. Assassins even gunned down Vito. Sonny, his eldest, fought back while the Don recovered, and paid the price. Michael, the youngest brother, behind Fredo took over the reins. He and Tom led a war against the Five Families. They pulled the strings, and my boss, Aldo Trapani, pulled the trigger. He's Michael's right-hand man now, running the family in New York. These days, opportunities are everywhere, but so are new families, fighting for their share. It took a man like Hyman Roth to get everyone to the table. We're going to divide up Cuba, and get richer than we ever could back in the States. This'll be good for the family, and for me. My name is Dominic."

— opening narration

In 1958, three years after the events of the first game, elderly mobster Hyman Roth (Danny Jacobs) calls a meeting with the Corleone, Granados, Mangano, and Almeida families in Havana to discuss their future Cuban business prospects under the cooperative government of Fulgencio Batista. Roth announces his intentions to have his businesses divided between the four families once he retires. However, the guests become caught in the ongoing Cuban Revolution, and Corleone underboss Aldo Trapani (Rick Pasqualone) is killed during the chaos. Don Michael Corleone (Carlos Ferro), his brother Fredo (John Mariano), and Trapani's second-in-command, Dominic (Chris Cox), manage to escape aboard a private plane, and Michael appoints Dominic as his new underboss, placing him in charge of the family's businesses in New York City.

Six weeks later, Dominic is tasked with dealing with two ex-Corleone caporegimes, Carmine (Joe Paulino) and Tony Rosato (Peter Hulne), who have formed their own family and are dealing drugs. Frank Pentangeli (Gavin Hammon) wants them dead, but Michael suggests sending them a message by taking over their protection rackets and killing their men. Soon enough, Carmine offers to meet Dominic and Frank to make peace, only to try to have them killed. An assassin tells Frank that "Michael Corleone says hello" and shoots him, while Dominic escapes and confronts Michael, who denies being behind the hit. Shortly thereafter, Dominic kills Carmine and takes over his remaining businesses.

Later, Dominic is invited to Florida by Roth, and is met by Fredo, who has been sent by Michael to manage their hotels here. Roth and Fredo ask for Dominic's help in dealing with Don Rico Granados (Vic Polizos), who has begun fighting Roth over various properties, and Tony Rosato, who has relocated his empire to Florida. After killing Tony's men and taking over his businesses in Florida, Dominic returns to New York to kill Tony himself at his compound.

Shortly thereafter, Michael tells Dominic that a senate committee is building a case against the Corleones and has acquired a key witness - Frank, who survived the assassination attempt and believes Michael betrayed him. He then appoints Tom Hagen (Robert Duvall), the former Corleone consigliere and Michael's lawyer, as Dominic's new consigliere to assist him with his operations. Tom enlists Dominic's help in framing Senator Pat Geary (Chris Edgerly) for the murder of a prostitute, and then offering to get rid of the corpse in exchange for his friendship to the Corleones. Geary agrees, and reveals that the Mangano family are planning to start operating in Miami. Rather than go to war with them, Dominic, at Michael's advice, strikes a partnership with the Manganos. During this time, he also finishes off the Grandanos, bombing their compound and killing Rico.

After Dominic and Fredo are almost killed in a drive-by shooting, the latter blames the Manganos and convinces Dominic to exact revenge by taking over one of their warehouses. Outraged, Don Samuele Mangano (Ralph Peduto) declares war against Dominic's organization. Asking Roth for advice, he and his associate, CIA agent Henry Mitchell (Peter Hulne), tell Dominic that all their problems will be solved if Fidel Castro is killed and Batista is reinstated as president. Dominic travels to Cuba to assassinate Castro, but is stopped by Don Esteban Almeida (Sasha Roiz), who knew he was coming. Dominic manages to escape Cuba, but as his plane leaves, Roth arrives and ensures Almeida the assassination attempt will not interrupt their plans.

Back in New York, Michael demands to know why Dominic and Fredo didn't turn to him after the Manganos tried to have them killed. Fredo reveals Roth was behind everything, hoping to align with Batista and Almeida after Castro was killed. Fed up of being ridiculed and ignored, Fredo agreed to help Roth, who had promised him his own family. Furious, Michael disowns Fredo. Meanwhile, Michael is worried about Frank's testimony, and has his brother, Vincenzo (Ralph Peduto), brought over from Sicily, hoping to shame Frank into not testifying. Roth has Vincenzo kidnapped, but Dominic rescues him in time for Frank's testimony. Frank doesn't testify against Michael, and Geary dismisses the hearing.

After the hearing, Michael orders Dominic to kill the Corleones' remaining enemies: Roth, Mitchell, the Almeidas and the Manganos. Dominic successfully eliminates the two families and their heads, kills Mitchell in Cuba, and assassinates Roth, who was extradited from Cuba on corruption charges, at Miami International Airport. Returning to Michael and Tom, they congratulate Dominic, telling him the war is over and that, from now on, he will be known as Dominic Corleone. The game ends with Dominic killing Fredo on a fishing boat.

== Development ==
"The Godfather II offers players the ultimate fantasy of being a Don - of finally being the guy who calls all the shots for the family. By combining the strategic gameplay of thinking like a Don through the 'Don's View', with our intense, visceral 'Blackhand' combat, we are focusing on the game at the root of the Godfather franchise, the game of organized crime. In essence, we're creating a new niche in the open world genre."

— Hunter Smith; executive producer

The development of the sequel was unofficially revealed on May 17, 2007 when Nollenberger Capital Partners analyst Todd Greenwald sent out a note to investors recapping a recent visit he had paid to EA Redwood Shores. In the note, he spoke mainly about The Simpsons Game, but also mentioned a sequel to The Godfather was in the very early stages of development. Greenwald also stated the open world game engine used in the first Godfather game was also being used in The Simpsons Game, The Godfather sequel, and three other games; "the open-world engine was built from the ground up for The Godfather, and is now being used by five different franchises, including The Simpsons. The Godfather 2 is also in development currently, though timing is unknown". In July, at Electronic Arts' annual shareholders meeting, a shareholder asked Frank Gibeau, head of EA Games, about the company's attitude to M-rated titles, to which Gibeau replied "The appeal of those types of games is growing as the demographics start to open up for that older demographic. We make products like Godfather 2, Army of Two, Crysis -- a lot of products that appeal to that older customer."

Nothing more was heard about the game until June 2008, when John Riccitiello, CEO of Electronic Arts, commented at an investors meeting, "you can play [Godfather II] both at the street level, much like a GTA-style game, but you can also play it top-down, almost like you're in an RTS, controlling the strategy of the boroughs so you can see what's going on." On August 7, Xbox World 360 ran a story featuring information on the as yet still officially unannounced title. According to the article, the game would be "Scarface meets Total War", and would feature an open world environment combined with RPG and RTS elements. The article revealed the game would take place in New York City, Miami and Havana, and would once again feature extortion of business owners as a central gameplay element. It also revealed information about the crew mechanic, character classes, crime ring bonuses, and the basics of the favor system. In a press release on August 8, EA officially announced the game, which would be released for Microsoft Windows, PlayStation 3 and Xbox 360, and was slated for a February 2009 release. In the press release, EA stated

set in a stunning open-world environment, The Godfather II expands on the popular gameplay mechanics of the first game and doubles down on the series' signature BlackHand control scheme, which now features even more visceral hand-to-hand brutality at your fingertips, introducing a new combo system, pressure tactics and executions. In The Godfather II, players will fight alongside their hand-picked crew, who have their own skills and expertise. Each family member specializes in a specific field such as demolitions, arson, engineering, first aid and more. As the Don you control the family, sending some of your men on missions while heading off into action with others. The combination of strategic organized crime gameplay and brutal BlackHand action sets The Godfather II apart from other open-world games.

Speaking of "Don's View", executive producer Hunter Smith stated

In the 1960s, a mafia Don was only as strong as his family. We found the hierarchical culture of organized crime intriguing. Running an organized crime family in a world defined by family loyalty is something that we felt could introduce a new strategic element to the genre. That is what the Don's View is all about -- laying out a strategy to pick off the competition one by one. The Don's View is so unique, it could fundamentally change the rules of open-world games by blending action and strategy to create something entirely new.

"Really what Godfather's about in terms of us creating an action open world interactive game experience is "what's it like to be the Don, running a family in the world of organized crime?" That's really what started to resonate with us. It made us think that there's a game mechanic layer that we could add to the action open world experience that we thought we did well in Godfather, but tie that into a unique experience. So last time, you really felt like you were a mobster, but this time, can you be the mobster and can you be the Don? And that became the second layer we really added to the game."

— Hunter Smith; executive producer

EA first showed the game on August 14, in a non-playable beta build of the Xbox 360 version. They revealed their main design strategy had been "Act like a mobster, think like a Don;" they wanted to enhance the features from the first game, such as extortion methods and shooting, but also include an element whereby the player would be able to control their entire family on a larger scale. They also revealed Robert Duvall was reprising the role of Tom Hagen from the films and the first game, but, as in the first game, Al Pacino would not be appearing in voice or likeness in the role of Michael Corleone. A major concern for the developers was the behavior of the other families. Whereas in Godfather, the other families were relatively inactive, and simply waited for the player to attack them, in Godfather II, they are more proactive and will attack the player, and each other, on a regular basis. In the first game, once a player took over a business, they couldn't lose that business. However, in Godfather II, the other families are constantly trying to retake businesses from the player. The developers also explained the crime ring bonus system was built using an "under-the-hood" battle card model, whereby different perks are awarded for different rings owned, which determines how the families act. However, they emphasized the card game element only serves as the basis for the logic system that drives the behavior of the families, it is not actually a part of the game itself.

In November, EA showcased a playable alpha build of the game. Addressing the fact that the game deviated from the film's story more so than the original game, they stated they had taken some "creative liberties" so as to focus more on Dominic's actions. They felt that in the first game, Aldo's story and the "film story" were divorced too much from one another, and they wanted to ensure this didn't happen in the sequel. As a result, the game is not a direct retelling of the film, but instead non-canonically places Dominic directly into scenes in which he was not present in the film. They also consciously gave Fredo a much more central role than he has in the film, having him leave Cuba with Michael rather than staying behind.

On January 8, EA announced the game would be released in North America on February 24, and in Europe on February 27. However, on February 3, the release date was pushed back to April. John Riccitiello explained the decision was taken because the original February release date was seen as too cluttered, and EA felt that by pushing it back, The Godfather II would have better luck in the market. On February 11, new release dates were announced; April 7 in North America and April 10 in Europe. The game went gold on March 9.

On March 18, EA announced a new multiplayer option, which would be available as a free patch immediately upon the release of the game. Called "Don Control", it would be a new option available for all pre-existing multiplayer modes. Don Control lets one player from each team view the battle field from above, but not participate directly in the combat. As the Don, this player can drop waypoints anywhere, directing their teammates to strategic areas. Additionally, specific areas of the map, called "capture nods," can be controlled by either team. Once controlled by a team, the Don can activate the nod to do one of three things; give a health boost, give an armored vest, or explode when members of the enemy team approach. The mode also lets Dons wager in-game cash prior to the commencement of the battle. Dons sets the amount they wish to wager, and how much they will give to their team should they win. However, if a player loses, all cash wagered will be removed from their single-player campaign.

=== Marketing ===
In March 2009, EA launched a Facebook app, called The Godfather II: Crime Rings to help promote the game. Based on the crime ring mechanic from the game, the app allowed players to create a mobster and take over rackets, building crime rings and eventually becoming Don. Players were randomly placed into one of the five families from the game (Corleone, Rosato, Granados, Mangano and Almeida) upon joining the app. In early April, EA sent out brass knuckles to game journalists to promote the game. However, brass knuckles are illegal to own in several states. Realizing their mistake, EA requested everyone who received the knuckles return them. On April 9, EA opened a space for The Godfather II on the PlayStation 3's online service PlayStation Home. The space offered users five poker tables for No Limit Texas hold 'em, with promotional videos and concept art available for viewing.

=== Downloadable content ===
On April 1, EA revealed details of the first premium DLC, which would be made available on April 23. The "Pentangeli Map Pack" would feature new Cuba and junkyard multiplayer maps. The "Level 4 Weapons Bundle" would feature level four upgrades for all weapons. The "Jack of All Trades Pack" would feature Jimmy Lira, an arsonist/engineer/medic/safecracker equipped with a level two tommy gun. The "Corleone Bundle" would include all of the premium content in one pack. EA shut down their servers for the game on April 13, 2012. Electronic Arts contract for The Godfather license expired in 2014 with all DLC packs being removed from the PlayStation Store and Xbox Games Store as well as the games being digitally pulled from sale from Steam.

== Reception ==
Reception

Aggregate score
Aggregator	Score		
Aggregator	PC	PS3	Xbox 360
Metacritic	63/100	67/100	65/100

Review scores
Publication	Score		
Publication	PC	PS3	Xbox 360
Eurogamer	4/10	4/10	4/10
Game Informer		5.5/10	
GameSpot	4.5/10	4.5/10	4.5/10
GameSpy	2/5	2/5	2/5
IGN	7.6/10	7.7/10	7.7/10
Official U.S. PlayStation Magazine		3.5/5	
Official Xbox Magazine (US)			7.5/10
PC Gamer (US)	79%		

The Godfather II received "mixed or average reviews" across all systems; the PC version holds an aggregate score of 63 out of 100 on Metacritic, based on twenty-nine reviews; the PlayStation 3 version 67 out of 100, based on fifty-three reviews; the Xbox 360 version 65 out of 100, based on seventy-two reviews.

IGN's Jeff Haynes scored the PlayStation 3 and Xbox 360 version 7.7 out of 10, and the PC version 7.6 out of 10, writing "The Godfather II provides a good dose of entertainment, but the lack of difficulty holds the game back from truly becoming a great crime game." Although he praised the mix of action and strategy, he criticized the game as "way too easy" for both action and RTS fans. He also found numerous technical and graphical glitches; "characters will frequently find themselves stuck on objects or within walls [...] shadows which has look horrendous, loads of texture pop-in and rendering issues which stand out like a sore thumb." He concluded "It's still fun and has almost all of the elements of a great game, but until a harder difficulty level is added, The Godfather II falls a tad short."

Game Informer's Andrew Reiner scored the PlayStation 3 version 5.5 out of 10, and was critical of the use of the license, especially the frequent use of nudity. He wrote the game "draws more comparisons to the raunchy teen film Porky's than the masterful gangster story [...] The foundation is certainly here for an amusing dating game, but I honestly don't see how this content fits with The Godfather." He too was critical of graphical glitches, citing "two character models occupying the same space," "shooting the bottom crate in a stack, only to see the others float magically in the air," vehicles appearing and disappearing at random, and "bullets blocked by invisible barriers." He praised the strategic elements of the game, but wrote "The problematic gameplay, unfaithful story, and array of graphical glitches create an experience I wouldn't wish upon my worst enemy, which is a shame since all of the tasks associated with being the Don of a family are handled nicely."

GameSpot''s Justin Calvert scored the game 4.5 out of 10. He too was critical of the license, writing "If The Godfather II had been a mediocre, mindless action flick, the game of the same name could at least be considered faithful to its source material. As it is, though, Coppola's Mafia-themed masterpiece has been reduced to an uninspired, repetitive open-world action game." He criticized the game as being "released in an unfinished state, riddled with performance issues and bugs," and stated "the problem with almost every aspect of The Godfather II is simply that it feels unfinished. Dated visuals, voiced lines of dialogue that seemingly play at random and often inappropriate times, dead bodies falling through scenery, a car hovering in the air [...] cars and pedestrians that appear and disappear long before they leave your range of vision [...] - these are just some of the problems we encountered." He concluded "all you're going to find is repetitive, unsatisfying gameplay in an illogical, inconsistent world."

GameSpy's Allen Rausch scored the game 2 out of 5, calling it "just too bloody easy." He too criticized the design of the gameworld; "Godfather II commits one of the biggest sins of any sandbox-style game: being a boring and ugly sandbox. From an artistic standpoint, New York, Miami and Cuba are ugly, low-poly worlds filled with cookie-cutter design elements [...] The Godfather II's blah burgs come off looking like test levels the devs put together using an engine left over from the PS2 era." He concluded by calling the game a missed opportunity; "there's absolutely nothing wrong with the game in concept, and done properly, it would easily have established it as a classic on par with the film on which it's based. Instead we get brilliant concepts ham-handedly executed."

Eurogamer's Kristan Reed scored the game 4 out of 10, accusing it of "strangely lacking in soul, and consistently failing to make you care about what you're doing and why." He also found the game too easy; "there's rarely any requirement to play the game skillfully. You just charge in all-guns-blazing, snap between targets with the hugely generous auto-aim facility and blitz one obliging enemy after another. At the core there remains an enjoyably precise combat system, but EA has predictably pandered to the mysterious demands of the audience of players who want games to be played for them and want zero challenge [...] the sight of you and your AI buddies charging around getting raked with gunfire and sprinting away unharmed is a pathetic sight, and smacks of game designers not even bothering to try anymore." He concluded "this is a stark return to the EA of old, where a treasured licence is butchered irredeemably. Lacking both a challenge and soul, and failing to even engage on a narrative level, what you're left with is an overly forgiving shooter with weak strategy elements."

=== Sales and cancelled sequel ===
The game was a commercial failure. In North America, by the end of April, the Xbox 360 version had sold 155,000 units, and the PlayStation 3 version 91,000. After the poor critical and commercial reception of the game, EA announced they had abandoned plans to adapt the third film.
