= Corleone family =

Fictional family from The Godfather series

The Corleones
- The Godfather family
- First appearance: The Godfather (1969)
- Last appearance: The Family Corleone (2012)
- Created by: Mario Puzo

The Corleone family (/kɔːrˈlɛɔːnɛ/) are fictional characters in both the novels and the films created by Mario Puzo, first appearing in his 1969 novel, The Godfather. They are an organized crime family originating from the Sicilian town of Corleone, and based in New York City.

The Corleone family has drawn comparisons with the real-life Genovese and Bonanno crime families.

== Fictional history ==
The fictional Corleone crime family traces its roots to 1920, when Vito Corleone assassinated Little Italy's padrone, Don Fanucci, and took over Fanucci's territory along with his friends Genco Abbandando, Peter Clemenza and Salvatore Tessio. Shortly afterward, he founded the Genco Pura Olive Oil Company which was named after his closest friend Genco. Around 1925, Vito formally organized the family, with Genco as his consigliere and Clemenza and Tessio as caporegimes. They became the most powerful crime family in New York City after defeating Salvatore Maranzano during the Olive Oil War in the early 1930s. It was during this time that Vito's eldest son, Santino "Sonny" Corleone, made his reputation and eventually became a caporegime himself. Upon becoming successful, the family moved to a compound on Long Island.

The family surname had been "Andolini". When Vito, as an unaccompanied orphan, had presented himself to an Ellis Island official as "Vito Andolini, from Corleone, Sicily", the official had documented the name as "Vito Corleone".

=== Killing the Turk ===
In 1945, Don Vito Corleone declines the business proposal put forth by drug baron Virgil "The Turk" Sollozzo, and this nearly destroys the family. Sollozzo believed Vito's eldest son Sonny wanted to accept the deal, and he had his men gun down Don Vito outside his office. However, Vito survives and is hospitalized. Sonny takes over as acting Don of the Corleone family. After a second assassination attempt on Don Vito, Sonny has Bruno Tattaglia, son of Don Tattaglia, assassinated. The situation escalates further when Don Vito's youngest son Michael murders both Sollozzo and corrupt police officer Captain McCluskey during a meeting in the Bronx, which forces Michael to flee to Sicily. This triggers the Five Families War, during which Sonny is assassinated. After Sonny's death, the still-recuperating Don Vito makes peace with the other families, realizing that his true enemy is Emilio Barzini, who wanted to crush the Corleones to become the most powerful Mafia don in New York City.

=== Las Vegas ===
After Don Vito's semi-retirement, followed by his fatal heart attack, Michael succeeds his father as the Don. Michael carries out a plan to murder the other New York City Mafia bosses along with Moe Greene, who stood in the way of the family's business interests in Las Vegas, Salvatore Tessio, who betrayed Michael for Barzini, and Carlo Rizzi, who was involved in the murder of Sonny. Following this, Michael moves the family to Lake Tahoe. Michael attempts to legitimize the Corleone business, but is pulled back into crime after a failed attempt on his life by Miami gangster and Corleone business partner, Hyman Roth, attempting to halt the takeover of Las Vegas. Roth is eventually murdered on Michael's orders. Michael's older brother, Fredo Corleone, was ensnared by Roth to conspire against the Corleones. At their mother's funeral, Michael sanctions the assassination of his surviving older brother.

=== Legitimization ===
By 1979, most activities of the Corleone family are publicly legitimate. Michael Corleone, having sold their interests in casinos and hotels, invests only in businesses unconnected to the Mafia. Joey Zasa, an underboss in the Corleone's criminal enterprise, is resentful of the reforms. He aligns with aging Sicilian Don Altobello to orchestrate an assassination attempt on Michael during a meeting in Atlantic City, New Jersey.

=== Vincent Corleone ===
In 1980, Michael appoints his nephew and Sonny's illegitimate son, Vincent Mancini, to be his successor as Don of the Corleone family, allowing him to change his name to Vincent Corleone. In return for this, Michael orders him to end his relationship with Michael's daughter (and Vincent's cousin) Mary Corleone. Vincent assures him that he would.

Under Michael's mentoring, Vincent is transformed into a new man - wiser, patient, and aware of his status as the new Don. However, he retains a violent streak, as evidenced in his first act as Don. With Michael's tacit blessing, he orders the deaths of Gilday, Keinszig, and Lucchesi in one mass slaughter. However, Mary is killed in a failed assassination attempt on Michael. Vincent quickly and ruthlessly kills Mosca, the assassin responsible. Despite this, Michael still dies alone and despondent after an unknown period.

== Historical leadership ==
=== Boss (official and acting) ===
- 1920–1955 – Vito Corleone – semi-retired in 1954
  - Acting 1945–1946 – Sonny Corleone
- 1955–1980 – Michael Corleone
  - Acting 1958–1959 – Tom Hagen
- 1980–unknown – Vincent Corleone

=== Underboss ===
- 1940–1946 – Sonny Corleone – murdered by Barzini hitmen
- 1947–1954 – Michael Corleone – promoted to Acting Boss in late 1954
- 1955–1959 – Fredo Corleone – figurehead status only, murdered by Al Neri in 1959
- 1959–unknown – Albert "Al" Neri

=== Consigliere ===
- 1920–1945 – Genco Abbandando – died of cancer
- 1945–1954 – Tom Hagen
- 1954–1955 – Vito Corleone – informal, died in 1955
- 1955–197? – Tom Hagen – date of death unknown
- 197?–1980 – Connie Corleone – informal
- 1980–unknown – Michael Corleone – retired sometime before 1997

== Capos ==
=== The Bronx/Long Island faction ===
- 1920–1958 – Peter "Fat Pete" Clemenza – heart attack
- 1958–1959 – Frank "Frankie Five Angels" Pentangeli – became informant
- 197?–1979 – Joseph "Joey" Zasa – murdered

=== Brooklyn faction ===
- 1920–1955 – Salvatore "Sal" Tessio – murdered
- 1955–1959 – Albert "Al" Neri – by 1958 he was Michael's second in command in Las Vegas, officially promoted to underboss in 1959

=== Manhattan faction ===
- 1933–1940 – Santino "Sonny" Corleone – became underboss

=== Las Vegas faction ===
- 1946–1955 – Frederico "Fredo" Corleone – became underboss
- 1955–1959 – Rocco Lampone – killed by law enforcement officers

=== Miami faction ===
- c. 1930s–1958 – Johnny Ola – close associate of Hyman Roth, murdered

== Known soldiers ==
- ????–1958 – Frank "Frankie Five Angels" Pentangeli – became capo
- 1934–1945 – Luca Brasi – murdered
- 1934–1959 – Tony Rosato
- 1934–1959 – Carmine Rosato
- ????–1946 – Paulie Gatto – murdered
- 1946–1959 – Willi Cicci – became informant
- 194?–1958 – John "Johnny" Ola – murdered
- 1946–1955 – Rocco Lampone – became capo
- 195?–1955 – Al Neri – became capo
- 195?–197? – Joseph "Joey" Zasa – became capo
