= Peter Clemenza =

Fictional character from The Godfather series

- The Godfather character
- Richard S. Castellano portraying Peter Clemenza in The Godfather
- First appearance: The Godfather
- Last appearance: The Godfather: The Game
- Created by: Mario Puzo
- Portrayed by: Richard S. Castellano, Bruno Kirby (as a young man)

In-universe information
- Nickname: Fat Clemenza, Pete
- Gender: Male
- Title: Capo; Underboss
- Family: Corleone family
- Spouse: Mrs. Clemenza
- Relatives: Ray Clemenza (son); Don Domenic Clemenza (brother)

Peter Clemenza is a fictional character who first appeared in Mario Puzo's 1969 novel The Godfather. He is played by Academy Award nominee Richard Castellano in Francis Ford Coppola's 1972 film adaptation of the novel, and by Bruno Kirby (as a young man) in The Godfather Part II (1974).

== The Godfather ==
Born near Trapani, Sicily, Peter Clemenza is one of Don Vito Corleone's caporegimes and oldest friends, as well as the godfather of his eldest son, Sonny. He has a reputation as a superb judge of talent; his regime produced five future capos—Sonny, Frank Pentangeli, Rocco Lampone, Al Neri, and Joey Zasa. The novel also establishes that when Sonny asks his father to join the "family business", Vito entrusts Clemenza, already a seasoned criminal, with the responsibility of mentoring Sonny.

Clemenza is a supporting character in the main story, but several of his actions are key to the plot. For example, he is ordered by Don Corleone, via consigliere Tom Hagen, to oversee the punishment of two teenage boys who received suspended sentences for beating and attempting to sexually assault the daughter of undertaker Amerigo Bonasera. Vito's wife, Carmela, is the girl's godmother and Vito extracts a favor from Bonasera in return for dealing with the boys. Clemenza assigns the job to his best soldier, Paulie Gatto; Gatto enlists two former boxers who work as enforcers for the family to help him give the boys a severe beating.

When Gatto is implicated in drug kingpin Virgil "The Turk" Sollozzo's assassination attempt on Don Corleone, Sonny – now Vito's heir apparent – orders Clemenza to execute him. Clemenza considers Gatto's actions a personal insult, as Gatto had been his protégé. Clemenza recruits Rocco Lampone, a Corleone associate, to kill Gatto so Lampone can "make his bones". Clemenza has Gatto drive him and Lampone around for several hours on the pretext of locating housing ("mattresses") for Corleone soldiers in the event war breaks out with the other Mafia families. After Lampone shoots Gatto in the back of the head, Clemenza— upon returning to the car after relieving himself— utters (to Lampone) his most famous line in the film: "Leave the gun, take the cannoli."

When it is decided that Vito's youngest son, Michael, will murder Sollozzo and Captain Mark McCluskey, a corrupt NYPD captain on Sollozzo's payroll, Clemenza is assigned to prepare a gun for Michael to use, instruct him how and when to use it, and what to do after the shooting. Michael retrieves the gun, which Clemenza had planted in the bathroom of a restaurant, and kills Sollozzo and McCluskey. While Michael hides in Sicily, Clemenza and the other capos prepare for an all-out war against the other four families. The war ultimately claims Sonny's life. Upon returning to New York, Vito dies a natural death, and Michael succeeds his father as Don.

Clemenza, on Michael's orders, later takes part in the infamous "baptism killings" by assassinating Don Victor Stracci with a shotgun while the Don and his bodyguards were coming down on an elevator. He also garrotes Carlo Rizzi, Michael's brother-in-law, who conspired with Don Emilio Barzini to murder Sonny. Clemenza is last seen greeting Michael as "Don Corleone" and kissing Michael's hand as a sign of respect.

== The Godfather Part II ==
Clemenza does not appear in the present timeline of the film due to a disagreement between Castellano and Paramount Pictures over the character's dialogue and the amount of weight Castellano was expected to gain for the part. After Castellano bowed out of the film, Clemenza was written out of the script and replaced by Frank Pentangeli. It is explained that, by the time of the film, Clemenza has died under suspicious circumstances; when Fredo mentions that Clemenza died of a heart attack, Corleone hitman Willi Cicci scoffs, "That was no heart attack," implying that Clemenza may have been murdered.

Clemenza, however, appears in several flashbacks to Vito Corleone's early days, played by Bruno Kirby. He first meets Vito when asking his neighbor to hide some guns so the police won't find them. Vito does so, and Clemenza repays the favor by stealing an expensive carpet (assisted by a surprised Vito) and giving it to the Corleones for their apartment. Around the same time, Vito and Clemenza befriend a young Salvatore Tessio, who joins their gang. One of their lines of business is selling stolen dresses door-to-door; a deleted scene depicts Clemenza charming his way into the apartment of a young housewife and emerging a little later, having presumably had sex with her.

Later on, the trio's partnership is discovered by the local blackhander, Don Fanucci, who attempts to extort them. Clemenza initially suggests that they pay Fanucci to avoid any problems with him, but Vito talks him and Tessio into letting him "persuade" Fanucci to accept less money. Shortly thereafter, Vito kills Fanucci and takes over the neighborhood, marking the beginning of the Corleone crime family. Clemenza is last seen at Vito's side as they open Genco Pura Olive Oil, the front for their criminal empire.

== The Sicilian ==
Clemenza appears briefly in Puzo's second Godfather installment, The Sicilian (1984). He meets with Michael during his exile in Sicily at his brother Domenico's home in Trapani. They discuss what the fate of Turi Giuliano is to be, following the orders of a recovering Vito Corleone. Clemenza tells Michael that he should report to him after a week, with or without Giuliano, and that Michael might soon be able to return to America afterward. Clemenza then leaves on a boat to Tunis, telling Michael that he would be back the following day with new orders from the Don.

== The Godfather Returns ==
Clemenza's gradual takeover of the Corleone empire (with Vito and the other capos dead, he assumes a more prominent leadership role) in New York is briefly covered in The Godfather Returns, Mark Winegardner's 2004 sequel to Puzo's original novel. It also tells of Clemenza's involvement during Michael's return from exile and official initiation into the Corleone crime family. Most noteworthy, the novel depicts Clemenza's fatal heart attack (mentioned in The Godfather Part II), and the many conspiracy theories that he had actually been murdered by the Rosato Brothers, former Corleone soldiers who had formed their own gang after a dispute over the future of the family.

== 2006 video game version ==
The Godfather: The Game depicts Clemenza in a similar manner to his movie counterpart; Castellano's estate gave permission for his likeness to be used in the game. However, due to Castellano's death in 1988, all of Clemenza's dialogue had to be recorded by actor Jason Schombing. In the game, Clemenza, as a senior Corleone capo, becomes partners and good friends with the protagonist, Aldo Trapani. He gives him several missions, most of which are focused on weakening the power of other Mafia families, particularly the Cuneo family.

== See also ==
- Take the Cannoli, 2000 Sarah Vowell book
