= Michael V. Gazzo =

Film and television actor (1923–1995)

- Born: Michael Vincenzo Gazzo; April 5, 1923; Hillside, New Jersey, U.S.
- Died: February 14, 1995 (aged 71); Los Angeles, California, U.S.
- Resting place: Westwood Village Memorial Park
- Occupations: Playwright, actor
- Years active: 1953–1995
- Spouse: Grace Gazzo (3 children)
- Children: Peppi, Michael, Christopher

Michael Vincenzo Gazzo (April 5, 1923 – February 14, 1995) was an American playwright who later in life became a movie and television actor. He was nominated for an Academy Award for his role in The Godfather Part II (1974).

== Biography ==
Gazzo was born on April 5, 1923. He was of Italian ancestry. Gazzo served with the United States Army Air Forces during World War II. He was a member of the Actors Studio and later trained actors such as Debra Winger, Henry Silva and Tony Sirico. He wrote A Hatful of Rain, a Broadway play about drug addiction, which ran for 389 performances in 1955 and 1956. It featured Ben Gazzara and Shelley Winters in the two main roles, and was adapted into a movie of the same name by Oscar-winning director Fred Zinnemann in 1957. The movie was nominated for an Academy Award for Best Actor in a Leading Role (Anthony Franciosa). A 1968 made-for-television version (as a filmed play) featured Peter Falk, Sandy Dennis and Michael Parks. Gazzo's other screen writing credits include the Elvis Presley American musical drama movie King Creole in 1958. Gazzo authored the Broadway play The Night Circus, also featuring Ben Gazzara.

Gazzo was nominated for an Academy Award for Best Supporting Actor for his role as Frank Pentangeli in The Godfather Part II but lost to Robert De Niro who played Vito Corleone in the same movie.

=== Death ===
Gazzo died on February 14, 1995, at age 71 due to complications from a stroke. He was buried in the Westwood Village Memorial Park in Los Angeles.

== Filmography ==
- On the Waterfront (1954) - Bit (uncredited)
- A Man Called Adam (1966) - (uncredited)
- Out of It (1969) - Vinnie's friend
- The Gang That Couldn't Shoot Straight (1971) - A Black Suit
- Crazy Joe (1974) - Mob Soldier
- The Godfather Part II (1974) - Frank Pentangeli
- Kojak (1975) - Joel Adrian
- Brinks: The Great Robbery (1976) - Mario Russo
- Ellery Queen (Season 1, Episode 20 "The Adventure of Caesar's Last Sleep") (1976) - Benny Franks
- Welcome Back, Kotter (Season 2, Episode 12 "Hark, the Sweatkings") (1976) - Angelo DeMora
- Alice (1977) - Gino Tarantella
- Starsky and Hutch (1977) - Joe Durniak
- Barnaby Jones (1977) - Mr. Farinelli
- Baretta (1977) - Rico Giove
- Black Sunday (1977) - Muzi
- The Feather and Father Gang (Season 1, Episode 12 "The Mayan Connection") (1977) - Gutman
- Columbo (Season 7, Episode 2 "Murder Under Glass") (1978) - Vittorio Rossi
- Fingers (1978) - Ben
- King of the Gypsies (1978) - Spiro Giorgio
- Vega$ (Season 2, Episode 7 "Dan Tanna Is Dead") (1979) - Cruger Hallow
- Love and Bullets (1979) - Lobo
- The Fish That Saved Pittsburgh (1979) - Harry the Trainer
- Beggarman, Thief (1979) - Sartene
- Fantasy Island (Season 3, Episode 14 "The Lookalikes/Winemaker") (1979) - Frank Lassiter
- Taxi (1979) - Vince
- Cuba Crossing (1980) - Rossellini
- Alligator (1980) - Chief Clark
- Border Cop (1980) - Chico Suarez
- Hoodlums (1980) - Gus Azziello
- Sizzle (1980)
- Magnum, P.I. (Season 1, Episode 8 "The Ugliest Dog in Hawaii") (1981) - Victor DiGorgio
- Back Roads (1981) - Tazio
- Body and Soul (1981) - Frankie
- The Winter of Our Discontent (1983) - Marullo
- Sudden Impact (1983) - Threlkis (uncredited)
- Blood Feud (1983) - Johnny Masetta
- Cannonball Run II (1984) - Sonny
- Fear City (1984) - Mike
- Cookie (1989) - Carmine
- Beyond the Ocean (1990)
- Forever (1991)
- Ring of the Musketeers (1992)
- Last Action Hero (1993) - Torelli
- L.A. Law (1994) (episode "McKenzie, Brackman, Barnum & Bailey") (1994) - Roscoe Zambini
- Nothing to Lose (1994) - Joe (final film role)

== Sources ==
- Bacarella, Michael, ItalActors: 101 Years of Italian Actors in U.S. Entertainment, The National Italian American Foundation
