= Al Neri =

Fictional character from The Godfather series

- Al Neri as portrayed by Richard Bright in The Godfather Part II (1974)
- First appearance: The Godfather
- Last appearance: The Godfather's Revenge
- Created by: Mario Puzo
- Portrayed by: Richard Bright

In-universe information
- Occupation: Patrolman, enforcer, bodyguard, assassin
- Family: Tommy Neri

Albert "Al" Neri is a fictional character appearing in Mario Puzo's 1969 novel The Godfather and Francis Ford Coppola's trilogy of films based on it. In all three motion pictures, he is portrayed by actor Richard Bright. He functions as Michael Corleone's personal enforcer, bodyguard and assassin.

== In the novel ==
In the novel The Godfather, Neri begins his career as a New York City police officer, where he earns a reputation for a fierce temper, quick reflexes, and physical strength. He frequently patrols with a large flashlight, which he uses to assault Italian youths who run with gangs or to shatter the windshields of diplomats who disregard traffic or parking laws.

Neri is married, but his wife becomes afraid of him after he mercilessly beats up his sister's son. His nephew had been disrespectful towards his sister during a visit and Neri wanted to see the kid straightened out. After his wife leaves him, Neri kills a drug-dealer and pimp by cracking his skull with the flashlight and is convicted of manslaughter.

Tom Hagen and Peter Clemenza see Neri as a potential replacement for Luca Brasi, Vito Corleone's feared enforcer, and arrange his release from prison. Normally, policemen are barred from becoming made men, but they were impressed enough with Neri to recommend that Michael grant an exception to the rule. Michael, appealing to Neri's sense of loyalty and Sicilian-American roots, recruits him into Clemenza's regime. Clemenza is initially impressed by the ferocity that Neri displays in their first meeting. Neri later "makes his bones" and becomes Michael's chief lieutenant. He plays a key role in the wave of murders that re-establishes the Corleones as the most powerful crime family in the nation, personally murdering Moe Greene and Emilio Barzini on Michael's behalf. Neri carries out the latter murder while disguised in his old police uniform.

After Salvatore "Sal" Tessio is executed for betraying Michael, Neri is promoted to caporegime of Tessio's former crew. When Michael and his family move to Nevada, Neri becomes head of security for all hotels controlled by the Corleones.

== In the film series ==
In the film version of The Godfather, Neri's backstory is not mentioned. He does not say a word in the first film and following Michael's return from exile in Sicily, Neri becomes his bodyguard, accompanying him everywhere. In the famous "baptism sequence", Neri, disguised in a police uniform, guns down Barzini and his bodyguards on the steps of a courthouse, much as he does in the novel. However, the murder of Greene, which occurs simultaneously, is handled by another, anonymous gunman.

In The Godfather Part II, Neri is portrayed as Michael's unofficial second-in-command in his operations in Nevada, and is one of Michael's capos along with Rocco Lampone and Frank Pentangeli. In a deleted scene, Neri is shown "persuading" Meyer Klingman, a hotel owner, to give his interest in the hotel to the Corleone family. When Klingman protests, Neri slaps him in the face and pursues him through the casino's showroom, while casino security guards (now under Corleone control) do nothing. During a Senate investigation of Michael's criminal syndicate, Neri is identified as a capo for the Corleone family on an organization chart. It is strongly implied that Neri is responsible for the killing of the prostitute whose murder is used to frame Senator Pat Geary and force him into cooperation with the Corleones. Neri is seen washing his hands next to the bloody corpse of the recently slain prostitute. He also carries out the execution of Michael's brother Fredo Corleone, under Michael's orders: while out fishing together on Lake Tahoe, Al Neri shoots Fredo in the back of the head.

By the time of The Godfather Part III, with Michael's decision to "go legitimate" by selling his casino interests and transferring control of his rackets to former subordinate Joey Zasa, Neri continues to serve as his bodyguard, as well as becoming the new underboss (replacing Fredo Corleone). When Zasa betrays Michael and attempts to have him murdered at a meeting of the Commission in Atlantic City, Neri saves Michael's life and later helps Michael's nephew, Vincent Mancini, to plan Zasa's murder. When Michael retires and transfers control of the family to Vincent, Neri is the second to pledge his loyalty, after Calò, the former bodyguard of Don Tommasino. In the closing scenes of the film, Vincent calls upon Neri's skills one last time, sending him to infiltrate Vatican City, where he guns down corrupt Archbishop Gilday and tosses his body down a staircase.

== In other media ==
In Mark Winegardner's novel The Godfather's Revenge, Neri and his nephew take part in an attempt to obtain information from antagonist Nick Geraci's father. He is seriously wounded in a shootout at the end of the novel.

In The Godfather: The Game, Neri is voiced by Terry McGovern.
