= Emilio Barzini =

Fictional character from The Godfather series

- Richard Conte portraying Emilio Barzini
- First appearance: The Godfather
- Last appearance: The Godfather: The Game
- Created by: Mario Puzo
- Portrayed by: Richard Conte

In-universe information
- Nickname: The Wolf
- Gender: Male
- Title: Don
- Occupation: Crime boss
- Family: Barzini family
- Children: Emilio Barzini, Jr.

Emilio "The Wolf" Barzini is a fictional character and the main antagonist in Mario Puzo's 1969 novel The Godfather and in its 1972 film adaptation, in which he is portrayed by Richard Conte. The Barzini crime family was inspired by the Genovese crime family.

== In the novel ==
Barzini heads one of New York's Five Families, and is the second most powerful Mafia don in the country after Vito Corleone. His criminal interests are in narcotics, gambling, and prostitution, and he is looking to expand his empire to Las Vegas to take advantage of the Mafia's lucrative casino rackets.

Don Barzini first appears as a guest at Connie Corleone's wedding. Soon after, he arranges for his associate, drug lord Virgil "The Turk" Sollozzo, to meet Don Vito Corleone with an offer to join the Barzini and Tattaglia families in the narcotics trade. Sollozzo, in particular, is hoping to gain access to Vito's political connections. During the meeting, Sonny, the family underboss, expresses interest in the deal, but Vito refuses the offer as he finds narcotics too much of a "dirty business". Barzini then approves Sollozzo's plan to have Vito murdered in the hopes that Sonny, as his father's successor, will accept the deal. When Sonny refuses to enter the heroin trade after his father survives the attempt on his life, Barzini secretly conspires with the Tattaglia, Cuneo, and Stracci families to wage war on the Corleones, forcing them to make peace and open up their territory to drug trafficking. To this end, he conspires with Vito's bitter son-in-law, Carlo Rizzi, to draw Sonny into a trap where he is assassinated by a Barzini family hitmen while driving to his sister's house. After Sonny's death, Don Corleone agrees to lend his political protection to the enterprise and forgive the other families for having his son killed. Although it initially appears that Don Philip Tattaglia is responsible for organizing the anti-Corleone alliance, Vito soon realizes that Barzini is the true mastermind.

Not satisfied with the Corleones' submission, Barzini begins a larger plan to absorb their territory into his own by chipping away at Corleone rackets. At Don Corleone's funeral, Barzini has his mole in the Corleone family, caporegime Salvatore Tessio, approach Vito's successor, Michael Corleone, with a request for a meeting, intending to assassinate him and break up the family. What Barzini doesn't know, however, is that Michael is aware of his plans. Before he died, the elder Corleone had explicitly warned his son that the family's enemies would attempt to kill him in exactly this manner — at a supposed peace meeting — with whoever approached him with the proposal unintentionally exposing themselves as a traitor. Michael has been planning for some time to eliminate Barzini and the other Dons, and deliberately allowed Barzini to weaken his family to lull him into complacency. Shortly thereafter, Barzini is assassinated along with the other conspirators. Corleone enforcer Al Neri, disguised as a police officer, lies in wait for the Don outside of the New York Supreme Court building at Foley Square on the pretext of writing a parking ticket for Barzini's car. When Barzini emerges from the building, Neri guns down his bodyguard and driver, and shoots the fleeing Barzini twice in the back, letting his corpse tumble down the stairs as he jumps into a getaway car.

== Influences ==
Emilio Barzini is based on several real-life mobsters. His desire to take complete control of the New York Mafia is inspired by Vito Genovese, who made a similar attempt in the 1950s that ended with the disastrous Apalachin meeting. Barzini's mannerisms and management skills, as well as his skillful machinations and influence over the Five Families, are inspired by Frank Costello and Lucky Luciano; all three men served as bosses of the Genovese crime family.

== In other media ==
In Francis Ford Coppola's film adaptation of The Godfather, Barzini is portrayed by Richard Conte. Conte was previously considered for the role of Don Vito Corleone.

In The Godfather: The Game, Barzini's role is expanded. In the 1930s, he personally oversees an ambush that results in the brutal public murder of Aldo Trapani's father, a rising caporegime in the Corleone family. His son Aldo swears to take revenge on the Don. In the game, Aldo, rather than Al Neri, is the assassin who shoots Barzini dead on the courthouse steps.
