= Soldato =

Rank in Mafia hierarchy

Structure of a Mafia crime family

A soldato or soldier is the first official level of both the Sicilian Mafia and the Italian-American Mafia in the formal Mafia hierarchy. It is also commonly used as a rank in other Italian criminal organizations, such as the 'Ndrangheta and Camorra. The promotion to the rank of soldier is an elevation in the chain of command from the associate level. The associate, who is not an initiated member of the Mafia, must prove himself to the family and take the oath of Omertà in order to become an initiated made man and therefore rise to the rank of soldato.

Picciotto (plural: picciotti) is often used to refer to a lower-level mafioso or soldato, but it usually indicates a younger, inexperienced soldato and may even be used loosely to refer to a closely connected, up-and-coming associate who is not necessarily a made man yet (and therefore not yet officially a "soldato"). "Picciotti" usually perform simple tasks such as beatings, money collection, robbery, kidnappings and homicide.

== Duties and advantages ==
An associate can only be promoted to soldier after a period of being "on record" with an incumbent member of a family. He must be sponsored by the incumbent soldier's caporegime (capo or captain), promoted by the underboss and personally cleared by the family's boss. Once inducted into the Mafia, a soldier is now part of a crew, a collection of soldiers and associates working under a capo. A soldier's main responsibility is to earn money and give a portion of his profits up to his capo. Under most circumstances, a soldier never receives orders directly from the boss. Rather, the boss passes orders down the chain of command to the soldiers.

They also serve as muscle of their crime family. Like an associate, he can also be relied on to commit acts of intimidation, threats, violence and murder. The soldier is obliged to obey orders from his capo to commit murder for his crime family. As a made man, he is bound by the Mafia code of omertà and must serve loyally for life. Although a soldier ranks at the lowest level of the family, he has several advantages over an associate. Most notably, he is considered untouchable in the criminal underworld. If another mobster wants to kill a soldier, it is compulsory that he gets permission from the soldier's boss, and only then for an egregious violation of Mafia rules. In contrast, an associate can be killed solely on a soldier's whim. For example, when Philadelphia crime family associate Nicodemo Scarfo, Jr. was almost killed by a warring faction of the family, his father, Nicodemo "Little Nicky" Scarfo, Sr., pulled some strings to get him inducted into the Lucchese crime family, protecting him from any possible attacks in the future. Killing a soldier without getting the boss's permission is considered taboo in mob circles and can lead to the perpetrator of the murder getting killed himself. The lone exception to this rule is when the boss himself calls a soldier in; this may be because the soldier's capo has fallen into disfavor and the boss wants him killed.

A soldier has the responsibilities of all made men. He must vow to stay loyal to the Mafia for life and earn his superiors money. Whenever he is called for by his superiors, he must oblige without reservation. He must also never cooperate with authorities in any way and must serve out prison sentences without complaint. In exchange for their loyalty they have full access to their crime family's protection, power and connections. His organization is also expected to look after his family and sometimes pay for legal fees if he serves a prison sentence.

Like an associate, a soldier is required to pay tribute to the captain for the privilege of being able to operate. However, he does not have to give as much money from his criminal endeavors as an associate. He must have enough success in his schemes to remain in favor with his superiors and avoid becoming a liability. Some associates become soldiers because of their usefulness in strong arm work, but even they must demonstrate an ability to earn money. A soldier will be given profitable rackets to run by his superiors, but for the most part they must also generate money on their own.

Not all soldiers are treated equally within the family. A soldier is respected and treated according to the profits that his rackets generate and the loyalty that he shows to his family. A boss's son, like Alphonse Persico of the Colombo crime family, may be a soldier, but all family members and mobsters from other families know from early on that he is being groomed for bigger things. Another soldier might be a great money earner and report directly to the boss, like Gambino crime family soldier Robert DiBernardo did in the 1980s when Paul Castellano was boss. Others, like the Chicago Outfit's Felix Alderisio in the 1950s, are greatly respected for their crafty ruthlessness.

Soldiers can be virtually broke, just managing to earn enough cash to live day-to-day. Aside from any rackets that are given to them (which can vary in profitability depending on the strength of their crime family), they are often left to survive on their own means. Unlike their superiors, they do not have made men beneath them to generate revenue for them. However, they are now better positioned to organize and lead their own group of associates and wannabes eager to prove their worth. Often, they live lavish and extravagant lifestyles while not saving any legitimate money. They may also spend exorbitant sums of money on lawyer's fees while their earning ability is thwarted by incarceration or police surveillance. They can also be millionaires through their own prowess by having full access to their family's business/political connections, making them powers in their own right. For example, John Baudanza, a soldier in the Lucchese crime family, was able to make millions from running a pump and dump scam with his crew. Soldier Ralph Scopo of the Colombo crime family controlled a key labor union in construction and was a major player in a multimillion-dollar racketeering scheme run by the Five Families. Earlier, labor racketeer and union official Anthony "Tough Tony" Anastasio, a soldier in the Mangano crime family (what is now the Gambino family), ruled the Brooklyn waterfront with an iron hand for three decades and delivered millions to the mob via kickbacks from union dues, stolen goods and payoffs.

Depending on the power of the family to which they belong, they can also receive "no-show jobs" (being employed at a job and receiving pay checks without ever showing up to work) due to their crime family's infiltration of legitimate businesses like construction, waste management, etc. Ultimately, the amount of money made varies greatly from soldier to soldier.

== See also ==
- Caporegime
