= Francis Ford Coppola filmography =

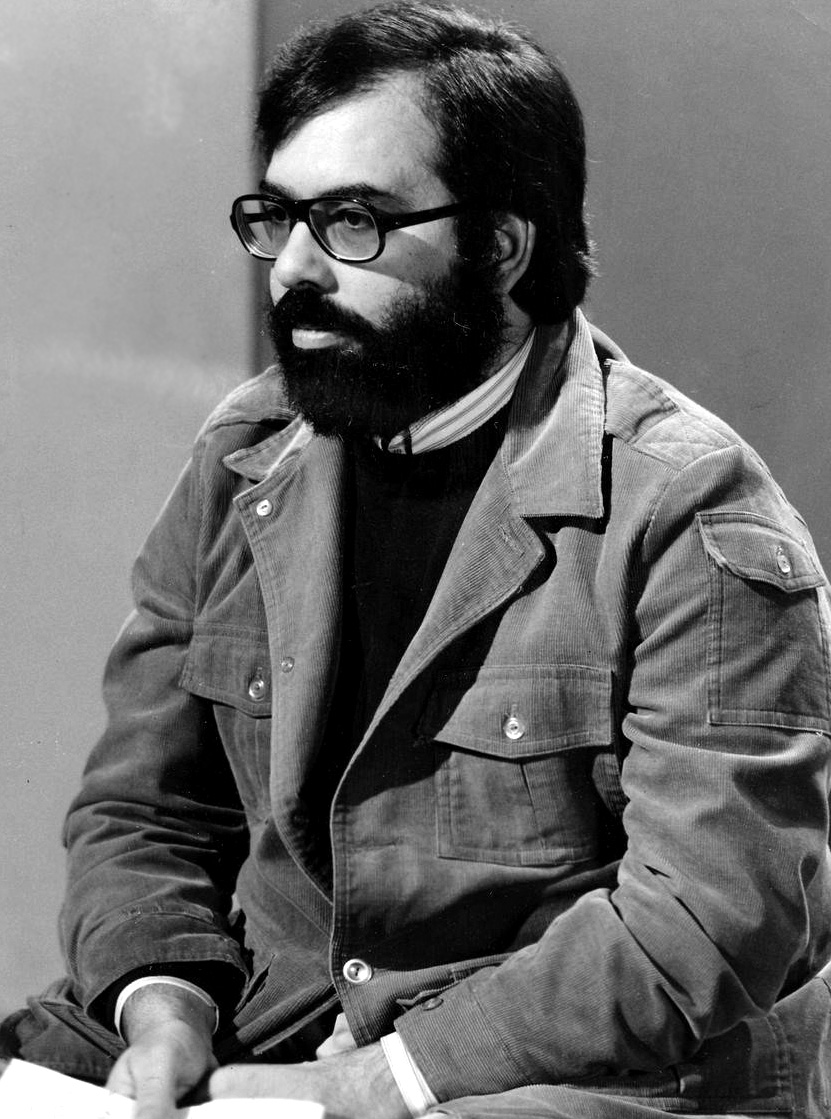
Coppola in 1976

Francis Ford Coppola (born 1939) is an American film director, producer, and screenwriter whose career spans more than sixty years. Coppola has directed twenty-three feature films to date.

His films The Godfather (1972), The Godfather Part II, The Conversation (both 1974), and Apocalypse Now (1979) are often cited among the greatest films ever made.

Coppola has, since 2000, issued new versions of several of his films, including Apocalypse Now: Redux (2001), The Outsiders: The Complete Novel (2005), The Cotton Club: Encore (2017), Apocalypse Now Final Cut (2019), and The Godfather Coda: The Death of Michael Corleone (2020), among others.

== Film ==
Year	Title	Director	Writer	Producer	Notes
1963	The Terror	Uncredited	No	Associate	Replaced Roger Corman as director for 11 days. Then was replaced by Dennis Jakobs.
1963	Dementia 13	Yes	Yes	No	
1966	You're a Big Boy Now	Yes	Yes	No	
1968	Finian's Rainbow	Yes	No	No	
1969	The Rain People	Yes	Yes	No	
1972	The Godfather	Yes	Yes	No	Co-writer with Mario Puzo; Inducted into the National Film Registry in 1990
1974	The Conversation	Yes	Yes	Yes	Inducted into the National Film Registry in 1995
1974	The Godfather Part II	Yes	Yes	Yes	Co-writer with Mario Puzo; Inducted into the National Film Registry in 1993
1979	Apocalypse Now	Yes	Yes	Yes	Co-writer with John Milius and Michael Herr, also composer with Carmine Coppola, Cameo: TV News Director; Inducted into the National Film Registry in 2000
1982	One from the Heart	Yes	Yes	No	Co-writer with Armyan Bernstein
1983	The Outsiders	Yes	No	No	
1983	Rumble Fish	Yes	Yes	Executive	Co-writer with S. E. Hinton
1984	The Cotton Club	Yes	Yes	No	Co-writer with William Kennedy
1986	Captain EO	Yes	Yes	No	Short film, co-writer with George Lucas and Rusty Lemorande
1986	Peggy Sue Got Married	Yes	No	No	
1987	Gardens of Stone	Yes	No	Yes	
1988	Tucker: The Man and His Dream	Yes	No	No	
1989	New York Stories	Yes	Yes	No	Segment: "Life Without Zoë", co-writer with Sofia Coppola
1990	The Godfather Part III	Yes	Yes	Yes	Co-writer with Mario Puzo
1992	Bram Stoker's Dracula	Yes	No	Yes	
1996	Jack	Yes	No	Yes	
1997	The Rainmaker	Yes	Yes	No	
2007	Youth Without Youth	Yes	Yes	Yes	
2009	Tetro	Yes	Yes	Yes	
2011	Twixt	Yes	Yes	Yes	
2024	Megalopolis	Yes	Yes	Yes	

=== Writer only ===
Year	Title	Director	Notes
1966	Is Paris Burning?	René Clément	Co-writer with Gore Vidal, Jean Aurenche, Pierre Bost and Claude Brulé
1966	This Property Is Condemned	Sydney Pollack	Co-writer with Fred Coe and Edith Sommer
1970	Patton	Franklin J. Schaffner	Co-writer with Edmund H. North
1974	The Great Gatsby	Jack Clayton	

=== Producer only ===
Year	Title	Director	Notes
1973	American Graffiti	George Lucas	
1994	Don Juan DeMarco	Jeremy Leven	Co-produced with Fred Fuchs and Patrick Palmer
1994	The Junky's Christmas	Nick Donkin	Short film
1994	Mary Shelley's Frankenstein	Kenneth Branagh	Co-produced with James V. Hart and John Veitch
1999	The Florentine	Nick Stagliano	Co-produced with Nick Stagliano and Steven Weisman
1999	The Virgin Suicides	Sofia Coppola	Co-produced with Julie Costanzo, Chris Hanley and Dan Halsted

=== Executive producer only ===
Year	Title	Director	Notes
1971	THX 1138	George Lucas	
1973	Paper Moon	Peter Bogdanovich	Uncredited
1979	The Black Stallion	Carroll Ballard	
1980	Kagemusha	Akira Kurosawa	
1982	Koyaanisqatsi	Godfrey Reggio	
1982	The Escape Artist	Caleb Deschanel	
1982	Hammett	Wim Wenders	
1983	The Black Stallion Returns	Robert Dalva	
1985	Mishima: A Life in Four Chapters	Paul Schrader	
1985	Return to Oz	Walter Murch	Uncredited
1987	Tough Guys Don't Dance	Norman Mailer	
1987	Lionheart	Franklin J. Schaffner	
1988	Powaqqatsi	Godfrey Reggio	
1989	Wait Until Spring, Bandini	Dominique Deruddere	Uncredited
1992	Wind	Carroll Ballard	
1993	The Secret Garden	Agnieszka Holland	
1995	Haunted	Lewis Gilbert	
1995	My Family	Gregory Nava	
1995	The Fantasticks	Michael Ritchie	Uncredited
1997	Buddy	Caroline Thompson	
1998	Lani-Loa	Sherwood Hu	
1999	The Third Miracle	Agnieszka Holland	
1999	Goosed	Aleta Chappelle	
1999	Sleepy Hollow	Tim Burton	
2000	Supernova	Walter Hill	Uncredited, also uncredited director of reshoots
2001	CQ	Roman Coppola	
2001	No Such Thing	Hal Hartley	
2001	Jeepers Creepers	Victor Salva	
2002	Pumpkin	Anthony Abrams; Adam Larson Broder	
2002	Assassination Tango	Robert Duvall	
2003	Jeepers Creepers 2	Victor Salva	
2003	Lost in Translation	Sofia Coppola	
2004	Kinsey	Bill Condon	
2006	Marie Antoinette	Sofia Coppola	
2006	The Good Shepherd	Robert De Niro	
2010	Somewhere	Sofia Coppola	
2012	On the Road	Walter Salles	
2013	The Bling Ring	Sofia Coppola	

=== Other roles ===
Year	Title	Notes
1952	The Magic Voyage of Sinbad	Screen adaptation and English-language re-editing of Sadko
1959	Battle Beyond the Sun	Shot new footage and re-edited for American release 1962 of Nebo Zovyot credited as Thomas Colchart, associate producer
1962	The Bellboy and the Playgirls	Shot and wrote new footage for American release of Sin Began with Eve (1958)
1962	The Premature Burial	2nd unit director
1962	Tonight for Sure	Re-edit with new footage of Wide Open Spaces
1962	Tower of London	Assistant director
1962	War Hunt	Cameo appearance (as Truck Driver)
1963	The Haunted Palace	Assistant director
1963	The Young Racers	2nd unit director
1968	The Wild Racers	2nd unit director
1982	Hammett	2nd unit director

=== Recurring collaborators ===
At the beginning of his career, Coppola assisted on a number of Roger Corman-directed films. Throughout his career, Coppola has repeatedly cast certain actors for his film projects. Singer-songwriter Tom Waits has appeared in six of his films, Robert Duvall and Laurence Fishburne have both appeared in five, and James Caan, Diane Lane, Frederic Forrest and Glenn Withrow have all appeared in four. Coppola worked with production designer Dean Tavoularis on several films beginning with The Godfather through Jack.

== Television ==
Year	Title	Director	Executive Producer	Notes
1980	Jerry Brown: The Shape of Things to Come	Yes	Yes	Live broadcast
1986	Saturday Night Live	Yes	No	Episode: "George Wendt and Francis Ford Coppola/Philip Glass"
1987	Faerie Tale Theatre	Yes	Yes	Episode: "Rip Van Winkle"

=== Producer only ===
Executive producer
Year	Title	Notes
1990	The Outsiders	13 episodes Adaptation of 1983 film
1995	Tecumseh: The Last Warrior	TV movie
1996	Dark Angel	TV movie
1997	Survival on the Mountain	TV movie
1997	The Odyssey	Miniseries
1998	Outrage	TV movie
1998	Moby Dick	Miniseries
1998–2001	First Wave	65 episodes
2000	Dr. Jekyll and Mr. Hyde	TV movie
2003	Platinum	6 episodes

Producer
Year	Title	Notes
1993	The Junky's Christmas	TV movie
1995	White Dwarf	TV movie
1995	Kidnapped	TV movie

== See also ==
- List of awards and nominations received by Francis Ford Coppola
- Francis Ford Coppola's unrealized projects
- Distant Vision
