= List of awards and nominations received by Francis Ford Coppola =

Francis Ford Coppola awards and nominations
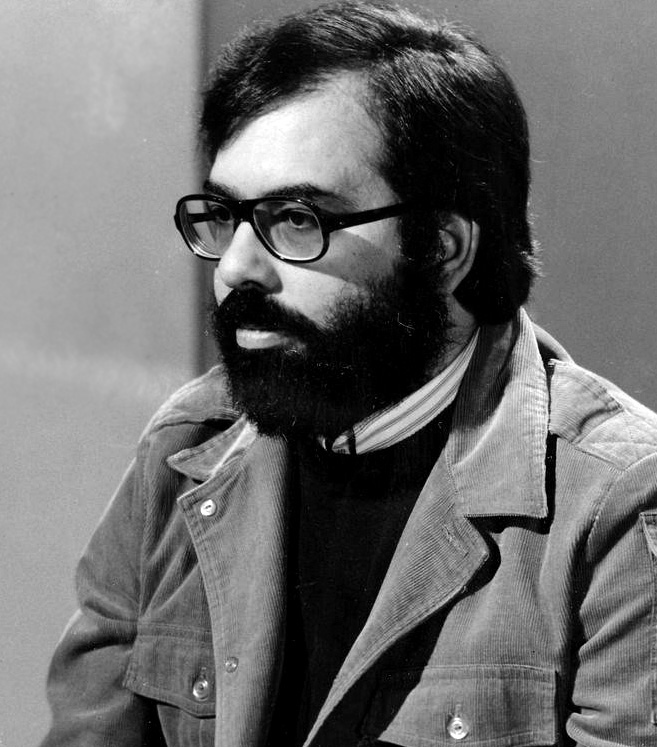
- Coppola in 1976
Awards and nominations
Award	Wins	Nominations
Academy Awards	5	15
BAFTA Film Awards	1	4
Golden Globe Awards	3	11
Grammy Award	0	1
Primetime Emmy Awards	0	2

Totals (Note: Certain award groups do not simply award one winner. They acknowledge several different recipients, have runners-up, and have third place. Since this is a specific recognition and is different from losing an award, runner-up mentions are considered wins in this award tally. For simplification and to avoid errors, each award in this list has been presumed to have had a prior nomination.)
- Wins: 54
- Nominations: 161

The following is a list of awards and nominations received by Francis Ford Coppola.

Francis Ford Coppola is an American director, producer, and screenwriter. Coppola is the winner of several film awards both nationally and internationally including five Academy Awards, a BAFTA Award, three Golden Globe Awards, and two Cannes Film Festival prizes. His movies The Godfather (1972), The Godfather Part II (1974) and Apocalypse Now (1979) are often cited among the greatest films of all time.

Coppola received his first Academy Award for Best Original Screenplay for the biographical war epic Patton (1970). He won the Best Adapted Screenplay for the gangster epic The Godfather (1972), and Best Picture, Best Director, and Best Adapted Screenplay for its sequel The Godfather Part II (1974). He was Oscar-nominated for American Graffiti (1973), The Conversation (1974), Apocalypse Now (1979), and The Godfather Part III (1990). At the 2nd Annual Governors Awards he received the Irving G. Thalberg Memorial Award from the Academy of Motion Picture Arts and Sciences. The honor was bestowed on him on November 13, 2010, along with honorary Oscars to Jean-Luc Godard, Kevin Brownlow and Eli Wallach.

He won the Cannes Film Festival's Palme d'Or for the neo-noir mystery The Conversation (1974) and the Vietnam War epic Apocalypse Now (1979). He also earned the British Academy Film Award for Apocalypse Now and three Golden Globe Awards for Best Director and Best Screenplay for The Godfather (1972) and Best Director for Apocalypse Now. He won the Directors Guild of America Awards for The Godfather and The Godfather Part II.

Over his career he earned numerous honorary awards including the Berlin International Film Festival's Berlinale Camera in 1991, Venice Film Festival's Golden Lion in 1992, the Directors Guild of America's Lifetime Achievement Award in 1998, a Gala Tribute from the Film Society at Lincoln Center in 2002, was inducted to the Hollywood Walk of Fame in 2022 and received the Kennedy Center Honors in 2024. Four of Coppola's films have been inducted into the National Film Registry, The Conversation, The Godfather, The Godfather Part II, and Apocalypse Now. Three of Coppola's films were listed as the American Film Institute's Top 100 films and he was named by Sight and Sound as the fourth greatest Director of all time in 2002. In 2025 he received the AFI Life Achievement Award.

== Major associations ==
=== Academy Awards ===
Year	Category	Nominated work	Result	Ref.
1971	Best Original Screenplay	Patton	Won	
1973	Best Director	The Godfather	Nominated	
1973	Best Adapted Screenplay	The Godfather	Won	
1974	Best Picture	American Graffiti	Nominated	
1975	Best Picture	The Conversation	Nominated	
1975	Best Original Screenplay	The Conversation	Nominated	
1975	Best Picture	The Godfather Part II	Won	
1975	Best Director	The Godfather Part II	Won	
1975	Best Adapted Screenplay	The Godfather Part II	Won	
1980	Best Picture	Apocalypse Now	Nominated	
1980	Best Director	Apocalypse Now	Nominated	
1980	Best Adapted Screenplay	Apocalypse Now	Nominated	
1991	Best Picture	The Godfather Part III	Nominated	
1991	Best Director	The Godfather Part III	Nominated	
2011	Irving G. Thalberg Award		Honored	

Directed Academy Award-nominated performances
Under Coppola's direction, these actors have received Academy Award nominations for their performances in their respective roles.

Year	Performer	Film	Result
Best Actor
1972	Marlon Brando	The Godfather	Won
1974	Al Pacino	The Godfather Part II	Nominated
Best Actress
1987	Kathleen Turner	Peggy Sue Got Married	Nominated
Best Supporting Actor
1972	James Caan	The Godfather	Nominated
1972	Robert Duvall	The Godfather	Nominated
1972	Al Pacino	The Godfather	Nominated
1974	Robert De Niro	The Godfather Part II	Won
1974	Michael V. Gazzo	The Godfather Part II	Nominated
1974	Lee Strasberg	The Godfather Part II	Nominated
1979	Robert Duvall	Apocalypse Now	Nominated
1988	Martin Landau	Tucker: The Man and His Dream	Nominated
1990	Andy Garcia	The Godfather Part III	Nominated
Best Supporting Actress
1966	Geraldine Page	You're a Big Boy Now	Nominated
1974	Talia Shire	The Godfather Part II	Nominated

=== BAFTA Awards ===
Year	Category	Nominated work	Result	Ref.
British Academy Film Awards
1975	Best Director	The Conversation	Nominated	
1975	Best Screenplay	The Conversation	Nominated	
1980	Best Director	Apocalypse Now	Won	
1980	Best Music	Apocalypse Now	Nominated	

Directed BAFTA Award-nominated performances
Under Coppola's direction, these actors have received BAFTA Award nominations for their performances in their respective roles.

Year	Performer	Film	Result
Best Actor
1972	Marlon Brando	The Godfather	Nominated
1974	Gene Hackman	The Conversation	Nominated
1975	Al Pacino	The Godfather Part II	Won
1979	Martin Sheen	Apocalypse Now	Nominated
Best Supporting Actor
1972	Robert Duvall	The Godfather	Nominated
1979	Robert Duvall	Apocalypse Now	Won

=== Emmy Award ===
Year	Category	Nominated work	Result	Ref.
Primetime Emmy Awards
1997	Outstanding Limited Series	The Odyssey	Nominated	
1998	Outstanding Limited Series	Moby Dick	Nominated	

=== Golden Globe Awards ===
Year	Category	Nominated work	Result	Ref.
1973	Best Director	The Godfather	Won	
1973	Best Screenplay	The Godfather	Won	
1975	Best Motion Picture – Drama	The Conversation	Nominated	
1975	Best Director	The Conversation	Nominated	
1975	Best Screenplay	The Conversation	Nominated	
1975	Best Motion Picture – Drama	The Godfather Part II	Nominated	
1975	Best Director	The Godfather Part II	Nominated	
1975	Best Screenplay	The Godfather Part II	Nominated	
1980	Best Motion Picture - Drama	Apocalypse Now	Nominated	
1980	Best Director	Apocalypse Now	Won	
1985	Best Motion Picture - Drama	The Cotton Club	Nominated	
1985	Best Director	The Cotton Club	Nominated	
1991	Best Motion Picture - Drama	The Godfather Part III	Nominated	
1991	Best Director	The Godfather Part III	Nominated	
1991	Best Screenplay	The Godfather Part III	Nominated	
1998	Best Limited Series or Movie	The Odyssey	Nominated	

Directed Golden Globe Award-nominated performances
Under Coppola's direction, these actors have received Golden Globe Award nominations for their performances in their respective roles.

Year	Performer	Film	Result
Best Actor in a Motion Picture - Drama
1972	Marlon Brando	The Godfather	Won
1972	Al Pacino	The Godfather	Nominated
1974	Al Pacino	The Godfather Part II	Nominated
1974	Gene Hackman	The Conversation	Nominated
1990	Al Pacino	The Godfather Part III	Nominated
Best Actor in a Motion Picture - Musical or Comedy
1968	Fred Astaire	Finian's Rainbow	Nominated
Best Actress in a Motion Picture - Musical or Comedy
1966	Elizabeth Hartman	You're a Big Boy Now	Nominated
1986	Kathleen Turner	Peggy Sue Got Married	Nominated
Best Supporting Actor
1972	James Caan	The Godfather	Nominated
1979	Robert Duvall	Apocalypse Now	Won
1987	Martin Landau	Tucker: The Man and His Dream	Won
1990	Andy Garcia	The Godfather Part III	Nominated
1997	Jon Voight	The Rainmaker	Nominated
Best Supporting Actress
1966	Geraldine Page	You're a Big Boy Now	Nominated
1968	Barbara Hancock	Finian's Rainbow	Nominated

=== Grammy Awards ===
Year	Category	Nominated work	Result	Ref.
1980	Best Score Soundtrack for Visual Media	Apocalypse Now	Nominated	

== Industry awards ==
Organizations	Year	Category	Work	Result	Ref.
Cannes Film Festival	1966	Palme d'Or	You're a Big Boy Now	Nominated	
Cannes Film Festival	1974	Palme d'Or	The Conversation	Won	
Cannes Film Festival	1979	Palme d'Or	Apocalypse Now	Won	
Cannes Film Festival	2024	Palme d'Or	Megalopolis	Nominated	
Directors Guild of America Award	1972	Outstanding Directing – Feature Film	The Godfather	Won	
Directors Guild of America Award	1974	Outstanding Directing – Feature Film	The Conversation	Nominated	
Directors Guild of America Award	1974	Outstanding Directing – Feature Film	The Godfather Part II	Won	
Directors Guild of America Award	1979	Outstanding Directing – Feature Film	Apocalypse Now	Nominated	
Directors Guild of America Award	1990	Outstanding Directing – Feature Film	The Godfather Part III	Nominated	
Writers Guild of America Award
Writers Guild of America Award	1966	Best American Screenplay – Comedy	You're a Big Boy Now	Nominated	
Writers Guild of America Award	1970	Best Original Screenplay	Patton	Won	
Writers Guild of America Award	1972	Best Adapted Screenplay	The Godfather	Won	
Writers Guild of America Award	1974	Best Adapted Screenplay	The Godfather Part II	Won	
Writers Guild of America Award	1974	Best Original Screenplay	The Conversation	Nominated	
Writers Guild of America Award	1979	Best Original Screenplay	Apocalypse Now	Nominated	

== Miscellaneous awards ==
Organizations	Year	Category	Work	Result	Ref.
CableACE Award	1987	Outstanding Directing in a Dramatic Special	Faerie Tale Theatre	Nominated	
CableACE Award	1993	Outstanding Animated Programming	The Junky's Christmas	Nominated	
Cahiers du cinéma	1984	Best Film	Rumble Fish	6th place	
Cahiers du cinéma	1990	Best Film	The Godfather Part III	4th place	
Cahiers du cinéma	2009	Best Film	Tetro	6th place	
Cahiers du cinéma	2011	Best Film	Twixt	3rd place	
César Award	1979	Best Foreign Film	Apocalypse Now	Nominated	
David di Donatello	1979	Best Foreign Director	Apocalypse Now	Won	
David di Donatello	1980	Best Foreign Producer	Kagemusha	Won	
Edgar Allan Poe Award	1974	Best Motion Picture Screenplay	The Conversation	Nominated	
Golden Raspberry Award	2024	Worst Picture	Megalopolis	Nominated	
Golden Raspberry Award	2024	Worst Director	Megalopolis	Won	
Golden Raspberry Award	2024	Worst Screenplay	Megalopolis	Nominated	
Hugo Award	1992	Best Dramatic Presentation	Bram Stoker's Dracula	Nominated	
International Confederation of Art Cinemas	2009	CICAE Award	Tetro	Nominated	
International Federation of Film Critics	1979	FIPRESCI Prize	Apocalypse Now	Won	
Japan Academy Film Prize	1984	Outstanding Foreign Language Film	The Cotton Club	Nominated	
Kansas City Film Critics Circle	1972	Best Director	The Godfather	Won	
Kansas City Film Critics Circle	1973	Best Film	American Graffiti	Nominated	
Kansas City Film Critics Circle	1974	Best Director	The Conversation	Won	
Kansas City Film Critics Circle	1974	Best Director	The Godfather Part II	Won	
London Film Critics Circle Award	1979	Best Film	Apocalypse Now	Won	
National Board of Review	1974	Best Director	The Conversation	Won	
National Society of Film Critics Award	1974	Best Director	The Godfather Part II	Won	
San Sebastián International Film Festival	1969	Golden Shell	The Rain People	Won	
Moscow International Film Festival	1983	Golden Prize	The Outsiders	Nominated	
Moscow International Film Festival	1987	Golden Prize	Gardens of Stone	Nominated	
San Sebastián International Film Festival	1983	FIPRESCI Prize	Rumble Fish	Won	
San Sebastián International Film Festival	1983	OCIC Award	Rumble Fish	Won	
Satellite Awards	1997	Best Miniseries or Movies for Television	The Odyssey	Nominated	
Saturn Award	1992	Best Direction	Bram Stoker's Dracula	Won	
Saturn Award	1992	Best Horror Film	Bram Stoker's Dracula	Won	
Saturn Award	1994	Best Horror Film	Mary Shelley's Frankenstein	Nominated	
Political Film Society	1987	Peace Award	Gardens of Stone	Nominated	
Political Film Society	1997	Democracy Award	The Rainmaker	Nominated	
USC Scripter Award	1997	Best Screenplay	The Rainmaker	Nominated	
Young Artist Awards	1983	Best Family Feature Motion Picture	The Outsiders	Nominated	
Young Artist Awards	1996	Best Family Feature – Musical or Comedy	Jack	Nominated	
WorldFest-Houston International Film Festival	1971	Grand Remi Award - Feature Film	THX 1138	Won	

== Honorary awards ==
Organizations	Year	Award	Result	Ref.
Berlin International Film Festival	1991	Berlinale Camera	Honored	
Venice Film Festival	1992	Golden Lion for Lifetime Achievement	Honored	
American Academy of Achievement	1994	Golden Plate Award	Honored	
Directors Guild of America	1998	Lifetime Achievement Award	Honored	
San Sebastián International Film Festival.	2002	50th Anniversary Award	Honored	
Film Society of Lincoln Center	2002	Gala Tribute	Honored	
Denver Film Festival	2003	Lifetime Achievement Award	Honored	
Antalya Golden Orange Film Festival	2007	Honorary Award	Honored	
Academy of Motion Picture Arts and Sciences	2010	Irving G. Thalberg Memorial Award	Honored	
San Diego Comic Con	2012	Inkpot Award	Honored	
Praemium Imperiale	2013	Statue	Honored	
California Hall of Fame	2014	Inductee	Honored	
Princess of Asturias Award	2015	Statue	Honored	
Order of Intellectual Efficience of Morocco	2015	Gold Medal	Honored	
Hofstra University	2016	Phi Beta Kappa Inductee	Honored	
Lumière Film Festival	2019	Lumière Award	Honored	
Hollywood Walk of Fame	2022	Inductee	Honored	
Morelia International Film Festival	2024	Inductee	Honored	
Kennedy Center Honor	2024	Inductee	Honored	

== Special citations ==
- He featured at No. 17 in MovieMaker magazine's 25 most influential directors of all-time.
- He also ranked No. 9 in TopTenReviews' list of top directors of all time and at No. 21 in Entertainment Weekly's top 50 directors of all time.
- Four of Coppola's films (The Godfather, The Godfather Part II, Apocalypse Now, and Patton) featured in the Writers Guild of America, West list of 101 greatest screenplays ever.
- Three of his films feature in AFI's 100 Years...100 Movies: The Godfather at #2, Apocalypse Now at #28, and The Godfather Part II at #32. The Godfather also ranks at No. 11 in AFI's 100 Years...100 Thrills. The following Coppola films were also nominated for the list: American Graffiti (1973) – Producer, The Conversation (1974) – Director/Producer/Screenwriter, and Patton (1970) – Screenwriter.
- In the 2002 poll of the Sight & Sound publication, Coppola ranked No. 4 in the Directors' top ten directors of all time and No. 10 in the Critics' top ten directors of all time. In a separate poll by the same magazine Coppla was listed at No. 8 on the list of the top ten film directors of modern time.
- Coppola was ranked at No. 15 on Empire magazine's "Top 40 Greatest Directors of All-Time" list in 2005.
- In 2007, Total Film magazine ranked Coppola at No. 5 on its "100 Greatest Film Directors Ever" list.
- Coppola serves as the "Honorary Consul H. E. Francis Ford Coppola" in San Francisco for Belize.
- Coppola is among only six people in Academy Award history to receive Oscars as a producer, director and screenwriter.

== Awards received by Coppola movies ==
Year	Film	Academy Awards		BAFTA Awards		Golden Globe Awards	
Year	Film	Nominations	Wins	Nominations	Wins	Nominations	Wins
1966	You're a Big Boy Now	1		1		3	
1966	Is Paris Burning?	2				1	
1968	Finian's Rainbow	2				5	
1970	Patton	10	7	2		3	2
1972	The Godfather	10	3	5	1	7	6
1973	American Graffiti	5		1		4	2
1974	The Great Gatsby	2	2	3	3	4	3
1974	The Conversation	3		5	2	4	
1974	The Godfather Part II	11	6	4	1	6	
1979	Apocalypse Now	8	2	9	2	4	3
1982	One from the Heart	1					
1983	Rumble Fish					1	
1984	The Cotton Club	2		2	1	2	
1986	Peggy Sue Got Married	3				2	
1988	Tucker: The Man and His Dream	3		1	1	1	1
1990	The Godfather Part III	7				7	
1992	Bram Stoker's Dracula	4	3	4			
1997	The Rainmaker					1	
Total		80	23	39	11	56	17

== See also ==
- List of awards and nominations received by Nicolas Cage
- List of awards and nominations received by Sofia Coppola
