= Francis Ford Coppola =

American filmmaker (born 1939)

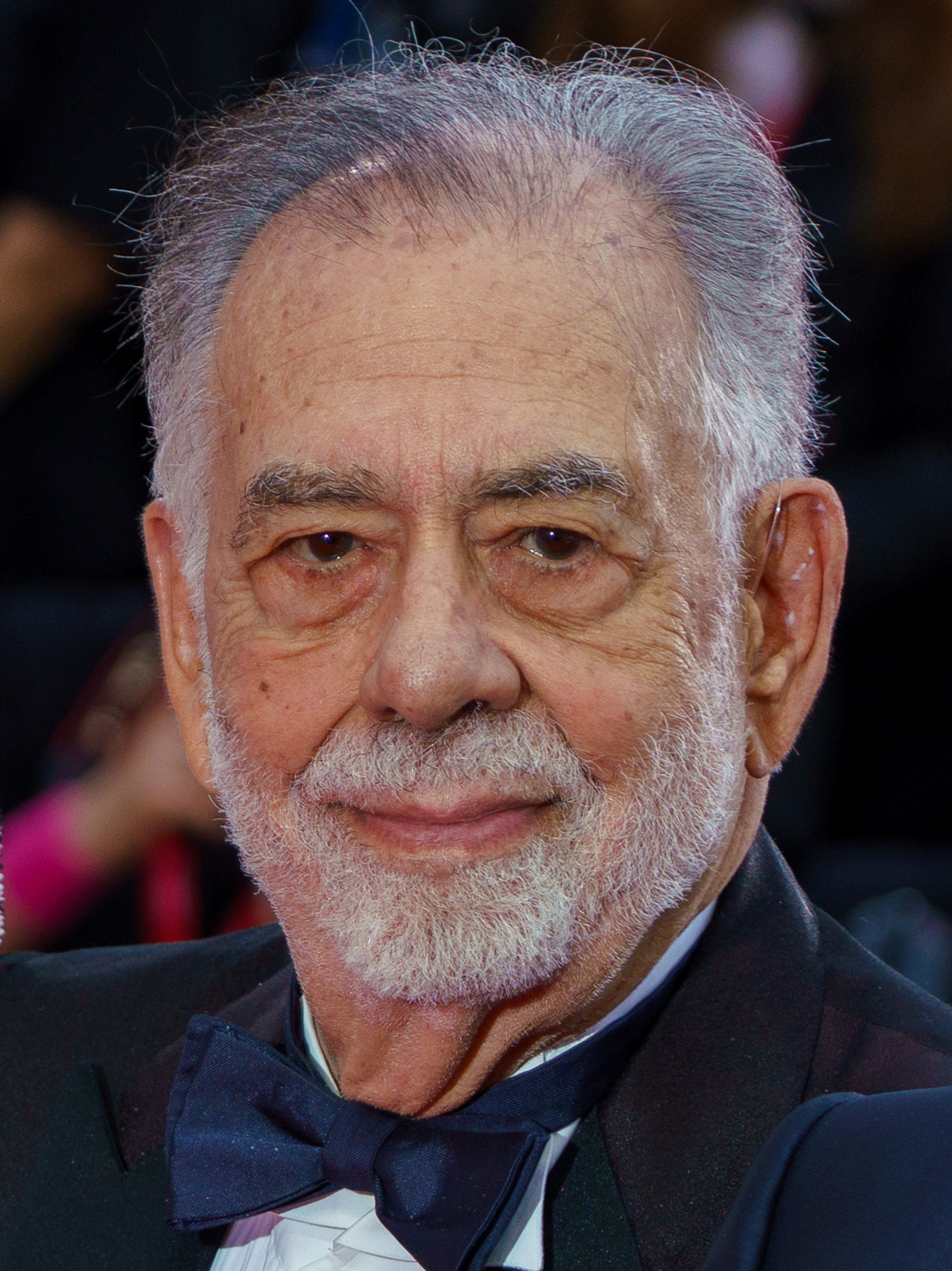
- Coppola in 2025
- Born: April 7, 1939 (age 87); Detroit, Michigan, U.S.
- Education: Hofstra University (BA); University of California, Los Angeles (MFA)
- Occupations: Director; producer; screenwriter
- Years active: 1962–present
- Organization: American Zoetrope
- Works: Filmography; unrealized projects
- Spouse: Eleanor Neil (m. 1963; died 2024)
- Children: Gian-Carlo; Roman; Sofia
- Parents: Carmine Coppola (father); Italia Pennino (mother)
- Family: Coppola
- Awards: Full list

Francis Ford Coppola (/ˈkoʊpələ/ KOH-pə-lə; born April 7, 1939) is an American filmmaker. One of the leading figures of the New Hollywood, Coppola is widely regarded as one of the greatest and most influential filmmakers in the history of cinema. (Note: Attributed to multiple sources:) He has received various accolades including five Academy Awards, a BAFTA Award, three Golden Globe Awards, and two Palmes d'Or, as well as nominations for two Emmy Awards and a Grammy Award. Coppola was also honored with the Irving G. Thalberg Memorial Award in 2010, the Kennedy Center Honors in 2024, and the AFI Life Achievement Award in 2025. Four of his films have been inducted into the National Film Registry by the Library of Congress.

Coppola made his directorial debut with Dementia 13 (1963). He then directed You're a Big Boy Now (1966), Finian's Rainbow (1968), and The Rain People (1970). After co-writing Patton (1970)—for which he and Edmund H. North earned the Academy Award for Best Original Screenplay—his reputation as a filmmaker was cemented with the release of The Godfather (1972) and The Godfather Part II (1974), which both earned Academy Awards for Best Picture, and the latter earned him Best Director. The films revolutionized the gangster genre. During that time, Coppola released the thriller The Conversation (1974), which received the Palme d'Or at the Cannes Film Festival.

Coppola's next film, the Vietnam War epic Apocalypse Now (1979), had a notoriously lengthy and strenuous production and also won the Palme d'Or, making Coppola one of only ten filmmakers to have won the award twice. He later directed films such as The Outsiders and Rumble Fish (both 1983), The Cotton Club (1984), Peggy Sue Got Married (1986), The Godfather Part III (1990), Bram Stoker's Dracula (1992), and The Rainmaker (1997). Coppola also produced American Graffiti (1973), The Black Stallion (1979), and The Secret Garden (1993). Dissatisfied with the studio system, he transitioned to independent and experimental filmmaking with Youth Without Youth (2007), Tetro (2009), Twixt (2011), and Megalopolis (2024).

Coppola's father Carmine was a composer whose music featured in his son's films. Many of his relatives have found success in film: his sister Talia Shire is an actress, his daughter Sofia is a director, his son Roman is a screenwriter and his nephews Jason Schwartzman and Nicolas Cage are actors. Coppola resides in Napa, California, and since the 2010s has been a vintner, owning a family-branded winery of his own. He was accused of sexual misconduct in 2024, including facing a civil lawsuit in Georgia while filming Megalopolis.

== Early life and education ==
Francis Ford Coppola was born in Detroit, Michigan, on April 7, 1939, to father Carmine Coppola (1910–1991), a flautist with the Detroit Symphony Orchestra, and mother Italia Coppola (née Pennino; 1912–2004), a family of second-generation Italian immigrants. His paternal grandparents came to the United States from Bernalda, in the Basilicata region of Italy. His maternal grandfather, popular Italian composer Francesco Pennino, emigrated from Naples, Italy. At the time of Coppola's birth, his father was an arranger and assistant orchestra director for The Ford Sunday Evening Hour, an hour-long concert music radio series sponsored by the Ford Motor Company. Coppola was born at Henry Ford Hospital, and those two connections to Henry Ford inspired the Coppolas to choose the middle name "Ford" for their son.

Francis is the middle of three children: his older brother was August Coppola, and his younger sister is actress Talia Shire. Two years after Coppola's birth, his father was named principal flutist for the NBC Symphony Orchestra, under the baton of Arturo Toscanini, and the family moved to New York. They settled in Woodside, Queens, where Coppola spent the remainder of his childhood.

Having contracted polio as a boy, Coppola was bedridden for large periods of his childhood, during which he did homemade puppet theater productions. He developed an interest in theater after reading A Streetcar Named Desire (1947) at age 15. He created 8 mm feature films edited from home movies with titles such as The Rich Millionaire and The Lost Wallet. Although Coppola was a mediocre student, his interest in technology and engineering earned him the childhood nickname "Science". He trained initially for a career in music and became proficient in the tuba, eventually earning a music scholarship to the New York Military Academy. In all, Coppola attended 23 schools before he eventually graduated from Great Neck North High School.

He matriculated at Hofstra University in 1955 as a theater arts major. There, he was awarded a scholarship in playwriting. This furthered his interest in directing theater, though his father disapproved and wanted him to study engineering. Coppola was profoundly impressed by Sergei Eisenstein's film October: Ten Days That Shook the World (1928), especially the quality of its editing, and decided to pursue cinema rather than theater. He said he was influenced to become a writer by his brother August. Coppola also credits the work of Elia Kazan for influencing him as a writer and director. Coppola's classmates at Hofstra included James Caan, Lainie Kazan and radio artist Joe Frank. He later cast Kazan and Caan in his films.

While pursuing his bachelor's degree, Coppola was elected president of the university's drama group, The Green Wig, and its musical comedy club, the Kaleidoscopians. He merged the two groups into The Spectrum Players, and under his leadership, the group staged a new production each week. Coppola also founded the cinema workshop at Hofstra and contributed prolifically to the campus literary magazine. He won three D. H. Lawrence Awards for theatrical production and direction and received a Beckerman Award for his outstanding contributions to the school's theater arts division. While a graduate student, Coppola studied under professor Dorothy Arzner, whose encouragement was later acknowledged as pivotal to Coppola's career.

== Career ==
=== 1960–1969: Rise to prominence ===
After earning his theater arts degree from Hofstra in 1960, Coppola enrolled in UCLA Film School attending with Bart Patton and Pete (John) Broadrick. There, he directed a short horror film, The Two Christophers, inspired by Edgar Allan Poe's "William Wilson" and Ayamonn the Terrible, a film about a sculptor's nightmares coming to life. He also met undergraduate film major Jim Morrison, future frontman of The Doors.

In the early 1960s, Coppola made $10 per week (roughly equivalent to $105 per week today). Looking for a way to earn some extra money, he found that many colleagues from film school made money filming erotic productions known as "nudie-cuties" or "skin flicks", which showed nudity without implying any sexual act. At 21, Coppola wrote the script for The Peeper, a short comedy film about a voyeur who tries to spy on a sensual photo shoot in the studio next to his apartment. Coppola found an interested producer, Austin Anton, who gave him $3,000 to shoot the film. He hired Marli Renfro, a Playboy Bunny, to play the model and had his friend Karl Schanzer play the voyeur. With The Peeper finished, Coppola found that the cartoonish aspects of the film alienated potential buyers, who did not find the 12-minute short exciting enough to screen in adult theaters.

After much rejection, Coppola received an opportunity from Premier Pictures Company, a small production company that invested in The Wide Open Spaces, an erotic western written and directed by Jerry Schafer, which had been shelved for more than a year. Both Schafer's film and The Peeper featured Renfro, so the producers paid Coppola $500 to combine the two films. After Coppola re-edited the picture, it was released as the softcore comedy Tonight for Sure (1962). Another production company, Screen Rite Pictures, hired Coppola to do a similar job: re-cutting the German film Sin Began with Eve (1958). Coppola added new color footage with British model June Wilkinson and other nude starlets. The re-edited film was released as The Bellboy and the Playgirls (1962). That same year, producer/director Roger Corman hired Coppola as an assistant. Corman first tasked Coppola with dubbing and re-editing the Soviet science fiction film Nebo Zovyot (1959), which Coppola turned into the sex-and-violence monster movie Battle Beyond the Sun (1962). Impressed by Coppola's perseverance and dedication, Corman hired him as a dialogue director for Tower of London (1962), sound man for The Young Racers (1963) and associate producer and one of many uncredited directors for The Terror (1963).

Coppola's first feature film was Dementia 13 (1963). While on location in Ireland for The Young Racers, Corman persuaded Coppola to use that film's leftover funds to make a low-budget horror movie. Coppola wrote a brief draft in one night, incorporating elements from Hitchcock's Psycho, and the result impressed Corman enough to give the go-ahead. On a budget of $40,000 ($20,000 from Corman and $20,000 from another producer who wanted to buy the movie's English rights), Coppola directed Dementia 13 over the course of nine days. The film recouped its expenses and later became a cult film among horror buffs. It was on the set of Dementia 13 that Coppola met the woman he would marry, Eleanor Jessie Neil.

In 1965, Coppola won the annual Samuel Goldwyn Award for best screenplay written by a UCLA student for Pilma, Pilma. The honor secured him a job as a scriptwriter with Seven Arts. During this time, Coppola also co-wrote the scripts for This Property Is Condemned (1966) and Is Paris Burning? (1966). Coppola bought the rights to David Benedictus's novel You're a Big Boy Now (1963) and merged it with a story idea of his own, resulting in his UCLA thesis project You're a Big Boy Now (1966), which earned him his Master of Fine Arts Degree from UCLA School of Theater, Film and Television in 1967. The film also received a theatrical release via Warner Bros. and earned critical acclaim.

Following the success of You're a Big Boy Now, Coppola was offered to work on an adaptation of the musical Finian's Rainbow starring dance legend Fred Astaire and Petula Clark in her first American film. Producer Jack L. Warner was not impressed by Coppola's shaggy-haired, bearded, "hippie" appearance and generally left him to his own devices. Coppola took the cast to the Napa Valley for much of the outdoor shooting, but those scenes were in sharp contrast to those filmed on a Hollywood soundstage, resulting in a disjointed look. Nonetheless, Finian's Rainbow (1968) was a critical and commercial success. The film introduced Coppola to George Lucas, who became a lifelong friend and a production assistant on his next film.

The Rain People (1969) was written, directed, and initially produced by Coppola himself, though as the movie advanced, he exceeded his budget and the studio had to underwrite the remainder of the movie. It won the Golden Shell at the 1969 San Sebastián International Film Festival. Coppola wanted to subvert the studio system, which he felt had stifled his visions, intending to produce mainstream pictures to finance off-beat projects and give first-time directors a chance. While touring Europe, Coppola was introduced to alternative filmmaking equipment and, inspired by the bohemian spirit of Lanterna Film, decided he would build a deviant studio that would conceive and implement unconventional approaches to filmmaking. He decided to name his future studio "Zoetrope" after receiving a gift of zoetropes from Mogens Scot-Hansen, founder of Lanterna Film. Upon his return home, Coppola and Lucas searched for a mansion in Marin County to house the studio. However, in 1969, with equipment flowing in and no mansion found yet, the first home for Zoetrope Studio was a warehouse in San Francisco on Folsom Street. Andrew Sarris, in The American Cinema (1968), wrote: "[Coppola] is probably the first reasonably talented and sensibly adaptable directorial talent to emerge from a university curriculum in film-making ... [He] may be heard from more decisively in the future."

=== 1970–1979: Breakthrough and acclaim ===
==== Patton (1970) ====
Coppola co-wrote the script for Patton starting in 1963 along with Edmund H. North. This earned him his first Academy Award for Best Original Screenplay. However, it was not easy for Coppola to convince Franklin J. Schaffner that the opening scene would work. Coppola later revealed in an interview,

I wrote the script of Patton. And the script was very controversial when I wrote it, because they thought it was so stylized. It was supposed to be like, sort of, you know, The Longest Day. And my script of Patton was—I was sort of interested in the reincarnation. And I had this very bizarre opening where he stands up in front of an American flag and gives this speech. Ultimately, I wasn't fired, but I was fired, meaning that when the script was done, they said, "Okay, thank you very much," and they went and hired another writer and that script was forgotten. And I remember very vividly this long, kind of being raked over the coals for this opening scene.

When the title role was offered to George C. Scott, he remembered having read Coppola's screenplay earlier. He stated flatly that he would accept the part only if they used Coppola's script. "Scott is the one who resurrected my version," said Coppola.

The movie opens with Scott's rendering of Patton's famous military "Pep Talk" to members of the Third Army, set against a huge American flag. Coppola and North had to tone down Patton's actual language to avoid an R rating; in the opening monologue, the word "fornicating" replaced "fucking" when criticizing The Saturday Evening Post. Over the years, this opening monologue has become an iconic scene and has spawned parodies in numerous films, political cartoons, and television shows.

==== The Godfather (1972) ====
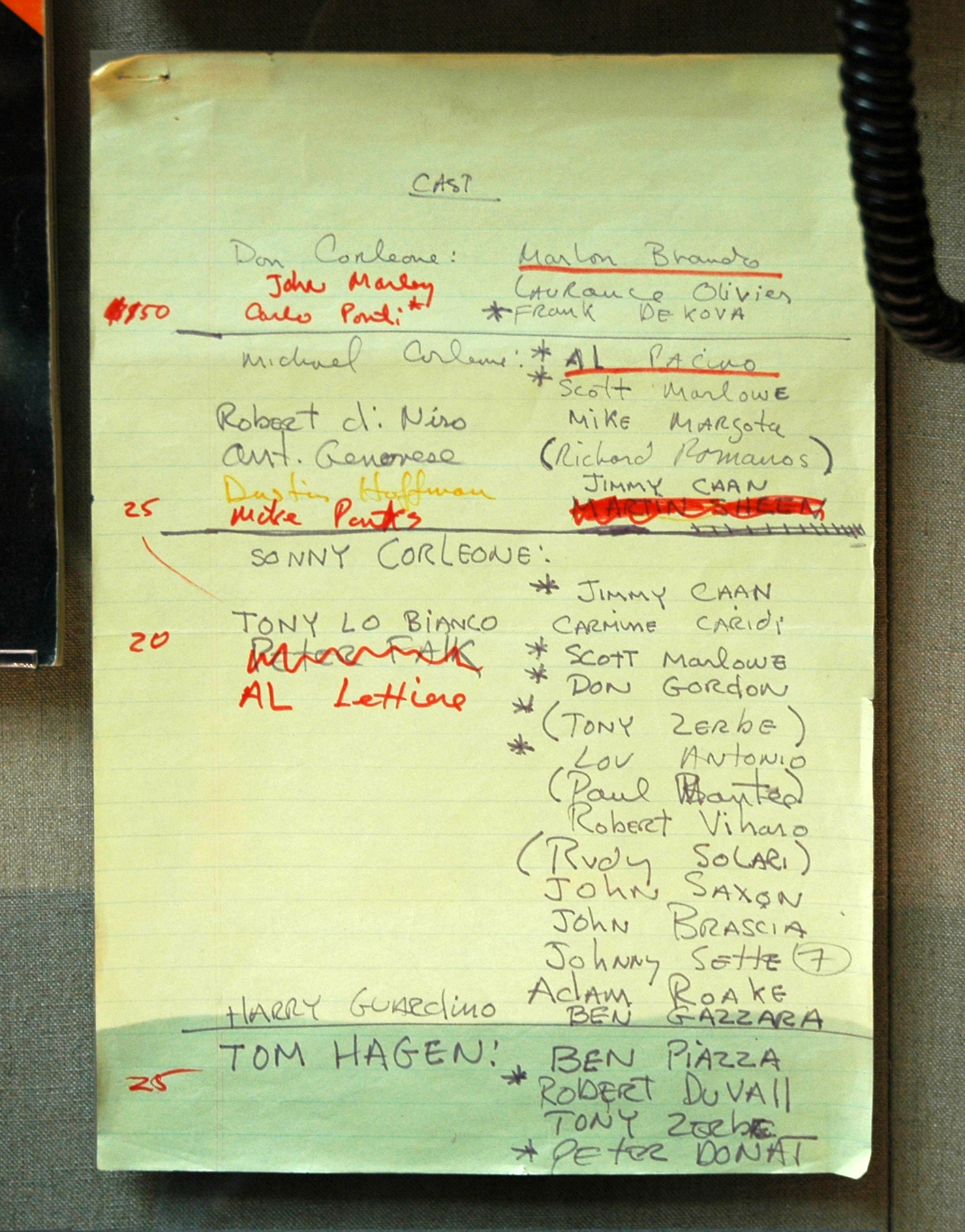
Coppola's handwritten casting notes for The Godfather at his winery in 2011

The Godfather (1972) was a turning point in Coppola's career. However, he faced several difficulties while filming. Paramount had owned the rights to Mario Puzo's novel, about an Italian-American mafia family, for several years. Coppola was not Paramount's first choice to direct; Sergio Leone was initially offered the job but declined in order to direct his own gangster opus, Once Upon a Time in America. Robert Evans wanted the picture to be directed by an Italian American to make it "ethnic to the core". Evans' chief assistant Peter Bart suggested Coppola, as a director of Italian ancestry who would work for a low sum and budget after the poor reception of The Rain People. Coppola initially turned down the job because he found Puzo's novel sleazy and sensationalist, describing it as "pretty cheap stuff". At the time, Coppola's studio American Zoetrope owed over $400,000 to Warner Bros. for budget overruns on THX 1138 and, when coupled with his poor financial standing, along with advice from friends and family, Coppola reversed his initial decision and took the job.

Coppola was officially announced as director of the film on September 28, 1970. He agreed to receive $125,000 and six percent of the gross rentals. Coppola later found a deeper theme for the material and decided it should be not just be a film about organized crime, but also a family saga and a metaphor for capitalism in America. The story follows the Corleone family as patriarch Vito Corleone passes the reins of power to his son Michael. There was disagreement between Paramount and Coppola on casting; Coppola wanted to cast Marlon Brando as Vito, though Paramount wanted either Ernest Borgnine or Danny Thomas. Orson Welles was also considered. At one point, Coppola was told by the then-president of Paramount that "Marlon Brando will never appear in this motion picture." After pleading with the executives, Coppola was allowed to cast Brando only if he appeared in the film for much less money than his previous films, would perform a screen test, and put up a bond saying that he would not cause a delay in the production (as he had done on previous film sets). Coppola chose Brando over Borgnine on the basis of Brando's screen test, which also won over the Paramount leadership. Coppola would later recall:

The Godfather was a very unappreciated movie when we were making it. They were very unhappy with it. They didn't like the cast. They didn't like the way I was shooting it. I was always on the verge of getting fired. So it was an extremely nightmarish experience. I had two little kids, and the third one was born during that. We lived in a little apartment, and I was basically frightened that they didn't like it. They had as much as said that, so when it was all over I wasn't at all confident that it was going to be successful, and that I'd ever get another job.

The film was a critical and commercial success, setting the box office record. Pauline Kael wrote:

Coppola, a young director who has never had a big hit, may have done the movie for money, as he claims—in order to make the pictures he really wants to make, he says—but this picture was made at peak capacity. He has salvaged Puzo’s energy and lent the narrative dignity. Given the circumstances and the rush to complete the film and bring it to market, Coppola has not only done his best but pushed himself farther than he may realize. The movie is on the heroic scale of earlier pictures on broad themes, such as On the Waterfront, From Here to Eternity, and The Nun’s Story. It offers a wide, startlingly vivid view of a Mafia dynasty. The abundance is from the book; the quality of feeling is Coppola’s ... The direction is tenaciously intelligent. Coppola holds on and pulls it all together. The trash novel is there underneath, but he attempts to draw the patterns out of the particulars. It’s amazing how encompassing the view seems to be—what a sense you get of a broad historical perspective, considering that the span is only from 1945 to the mid-fifties, at which time the Corleone family, already forced by competitive pressures into dealing in narcotics, is moving its base of operations to Las Vegas.

In addition to Brando, the film starred Al Pacino, James Caan, John Cazale and Robert Duvall. It featured Richard Castellano, Sterling Hayden, Diane Keaton and Coppola's sister Talia Shire. Brando won the Academy Award for Best Actor, which he refused to accept. The film won Best Picture and the Best Adapted Screenplay. Coppola was nominated for Best Director but lost to Bob Fosse for Cabaret. For the score, Coppola commissioned Nino Rota, who had scored many Fellini films. Gordon Willis's chiaroscuro cinematography was acclaimed, as was Dean Tavoularis's period production design.

The film routinely ranks near the top of polls for the greatest movies ever. It was ranked third, behind Citizen Kane (1941) and Casablanca (1942), on the American Film Institute's inaugural AFI's 100 Years...100 Movies list in 1997. In 2007, it had moved to second place, ahead of Casablanca and behind Kane. David Thomson writes that "The Godfather deserved all its success because it had the nerve to take its 175 minutes slowly ... It has a calm faith in narrative control that had not been current in Hollywood for twenty years. It was like a film of the forties in its nostalgic decor; its command of great supporting actors; in Gordon Willis's bold exploration of a film noir in color; and in its fascination with evil."

==== The Conversation (1974) ====
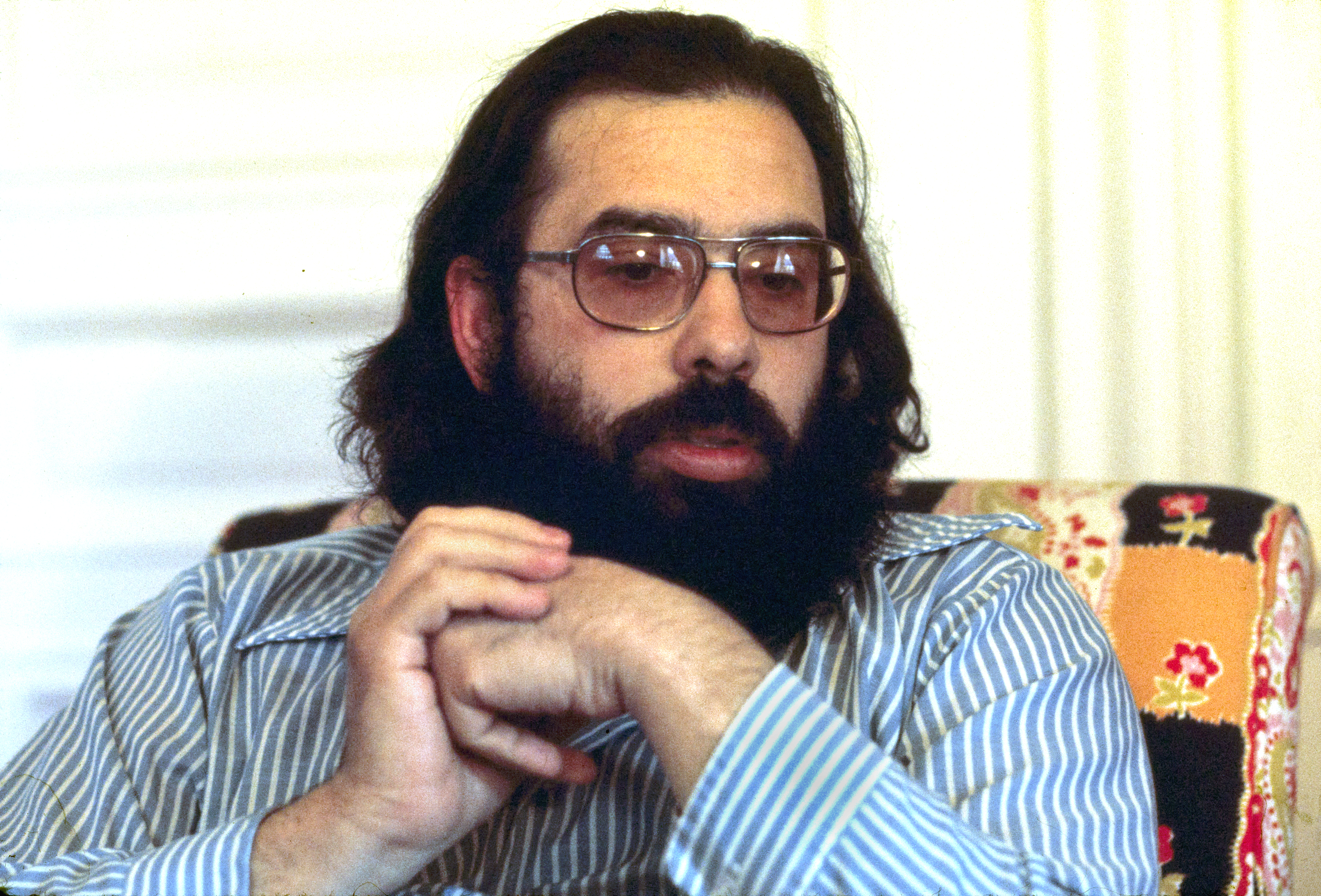
Coppola in 1973

The Conversation (1974) further cemented Coppola's reputation. It was influenced by Michelangelo Antonioni's Blowup (1966) and generated much interest when news leaked that it featured the same surveillance and wire-tapping equipment that members of the Nixon administration used to spy on political opponents in the Watergate scandal. Coppola claimed that this was purely coincidental, as the script for The Conversation was completed in the mid-1960s. However, audiences interpreted the film as a reaction to Watergate and its fallout. It stars Gene Hackman as Harry Caul, "the best bugger on the West Coast", hired to spy on a young couple played by Cindy Williams and Frederic Forrest. It features Cazale as his partner, Stan. The movie was a critical success and won Coppola his first Palme d'Or at the 1974 Cannes Film Festival. The film received three Oscar nominations: Best Picture, Best Original Screenplay, and Best Sound. Coppola's brother-in-law David Shire wrote the score and Walter Murch edited the picture, as Coppola started work on his next project.

==== The Godfather Part II (1974) ====
The Godfather Part II is both prequel and sequel to the first film, telling parallel stories of the rise of young Vito Corleone and the fall of his son Michael. After its five-hour-long preview, George Lucas told Coppola, "You have two films. Take one away, it doesn't work." Coppola claims it was the first major motion picture to use "Part II" in its title; he was influenced by Sergei Eisenstein's two-part Ivan the Terrible. Paramount was initially opposed to his decision to name the movie The Godfather Part II. According to Coppola, the studio's objection stemmed from the belief that audiences would be reluctant to see a film with such a title, as the audience would supposedly believe that, having already seen The Godfather, there was little reason to see an addition to the original film. However, the success of The Godfather Part II began the Hollywood tradition of numbered sequels.

The movie received tremendous critical acclaim, with many deeming it superior to its predecessor. Kael wrote:

Coppola has plunged us back into the sensuality and terror of the first film. And, with the relentlessness of a master, he goes farther and farther. The daring of Part II is that it enlarges the scope and deepens the meaning of the first film ... The first film covered the period from 1945 to the mid-fifties. Part II, contrasting the early manhood of Vito (played by Robert De Niro) with the life of Michael, his inheritor (Al Pacino), spans almost seventy years. We saw only the middle of the story in the first film; now we have the beginning and the end. Structurally, the completed work is nothing less than the rise and decay of an American dynasty of unofficial rulers ... Part II has the same mythic and operatic visual scheme as the first; once again the cinematographer is Gordon Willis. Visually the film is, however, far more complexly beautiful than the first, just as it’s thematically richer, more shadowed, more full. Willis’s workmanship has developed, like Coppola’s; even the sequences in the sunlight have deep tones — elegiac yet lyrical, as in The Conformist, and always serving the narrative, as the Nino Rota score also does.

In addition to Pacino, Cazale, Duvall, Keaton and Shire reprised their roles from the first film. Newcomers included Michael V. Gazzo and Pacino's mentor Lee Strasberg. The Godfather Part II was nominated for 11 Academy Awards and won six, including Best Picture, Best Adapted Screenplay and Best Director. De Niro won Best Supporting Actor for his portrayal of Vito, making him and Brando the first actors to win Oscars for playing the same character. The film ranked at No. 32 on AFI's inaugural 100 Years...100 Movies list, maintaining its position ten years later. It is ranked No. 1 on TV Guide's "50 Best Movies of All Time" and at No. 7 on Entertainment Weekly's list of the "100 Greatest Movies of All Time". Together, the two Godfathers placed at No. 4 on Sight & Sound's 2002 list of the ten greatest films of all time. Thomson writes that "it exhibited a mastery of so many periods and locations as to be entrancing." It was one of the last major American motion pictures to be filmed in Technicolor.

==== Apocalypse Now (1979) ====
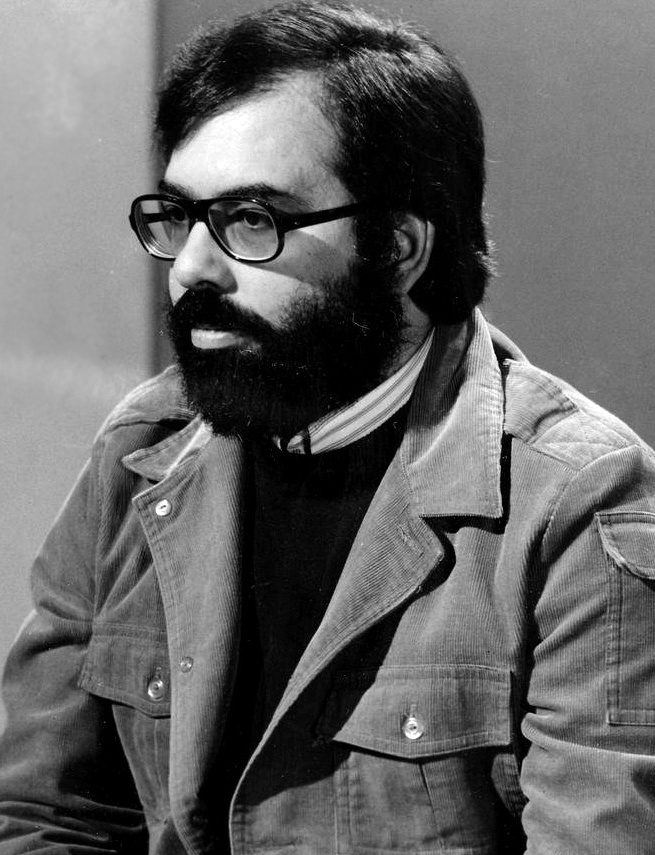
Coppola in 1976

Following the success of The Godfather, The Conversation and The Godfather Part II, Coppola began filming Apocalypse Now, an adaptation of Joseph Conrad's Heart of Darkness (1899) set in Cambodia during the Vietnam War. It follows Willard (Martin Sheen) as he journeys upriver to find and assassinate the rogue Kurtz (Brando). The production in the Philippines was plagued by numerous problems, including typhoons, nervous breakdowns, the firing of Harvey Keitel, Sheen's heart attack, Brando arriving overweight and unprepared and extras from the Philippine military and half of the supplied helicopters leaving in the middle of scenes to fight rebels. It was delayed so often it was nicknamed Apocalypse When?

Apocalypse Now premiered at the 1979 Cannes Film Festival, where Coppola made grandiose claims, among them: "My film is not about Vietnam, it is Vietnam." Despite such pronouncements, and complaints from critics that the film's message was confused, it shared the Palme d'Or with Volker Schlöndorff's The Tin Drum and won Oscars for Best Cinematography (Vittorio Storaro) and Best Sound (Murch, Mark Berger, Richard Beggs and Nat Boxer.) Roger Ebert wrote:

In his book The Films of My Life, the French director François Truffaut made a curious statement. He used to believe, he says, that a successful film had to simultaneously express "an idea of the world and an idea of cinema." But now, he writes, "I demand that a film express either the joy of making cinema or the agony of making cinema. I am not at all interested in anything in between; I am not interested in all those films that do not pulse."

It may seem strange to begin a review of Franics Coppola's Apocalypse Now with those words, but consider them for a moment and they apply perfectly to this sprawling film. The critics who have rejected Coppola's film mostly did so on Truffaut's earlier grounds; they have arguments with the ideas about the world and the war in Apocalypse Now ... Like all great works of art about war, Apocalypse Now essentially contains only one idea or message, the not-especially enlightening observation that war is hell. We do not go to see Coppola's movie for that reason—something Coppola, but not some of his critics, knows well. Coppola also knows well (and demonstrated in the Godfather films) that movies aren't especially good at dealing with abstract ideas—for those you'd be better turning to the written word—but they are superb for presenting moods and feelings, the look of a battle, the expression of a face, the mood of a country. Apocalypse Now achieves greatness not by analyzing our "experience" in Vietnam, but by re-creating, in characters and images, something of that experience.

An example: the scene in which Robert Duvall, as a crazed lieutenant colonel, leads his troops in a helicopter assault on a village is, quite simply, the best movie battle scene ever filmed. It's simultaneously numbing, depressing and exhilarating: as the rockets jar from the helicopters and spring through the air, we're elated like kids for a half second, until the reality of the consequences sinks in...

What's great in this film, and what will make it live for many years and speak to many audiences, is what Coppola achieves on the level Truffaut was discussing: the moments of agony and joy in making cinema. Some of those moments come at the same time; remember again the helicopter assault and its unsettling mixture of horror and exhilaration. Remember the weird beauty of the massed helicopters lifting over the trees in long shot, and the insane power of Wagner's music, played loudly during the attack, and you feel what Coppola was getting at: those moments as common in life as art, when the whole huge grand mystery of the world, so beautiful, so terrible, seems to hang in the balance.

The film's reputation has grown and it is now regarded by many as a masterpiece of the New Hollywood and is frequently cited as one of the greatest movies ever made, ranking at Number 19 on the 2022 Sight and Sound poll. For the film, Murch was the first person to receive a credit as a Sound Designer.

The documentary Hearts of Darkness: A Filmmaker's Apocalypse (1991), directed by George Hickenlooper, Fax Bahr and Francis's wife, Eleanor Coppola, who was present through the production, chronicles the difficulties the crew went through making Apocalypse Now and features behind-the-scenes footage filmed by Eleanor. Coppola famously stated, "We were in the jungle, there were too many of us, we had access to too much money, too much equipment and little by little, we went insane."

=== 1979–1989: Hard times ===
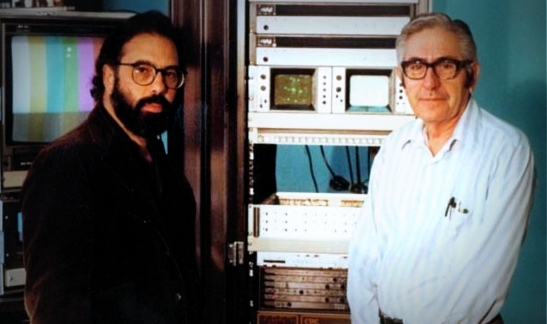
Coppola with Petro Vlahos

Apocalypse Now marked the end of the 'golden phase' of Coppola's career. His Las Vegas-set musical fantasy One from the Heart (1982), while pioneering in its use of video-editing techniques, ended with a disastrous box-office gross of US$636,796 against a $26-million budget, and he was forced to sell the 23-acre Zoetrope Studio in 1983. He would spend the rest of the decade working to pay off his debts. Ebert wrote that the film was "a ballet of graceful and complex camera movements occupying magnificent sets, and somehow the characters get lost in the process ... The storyteller of The Godfather has become a technician here. There are chilling parallels between Coppola’s obsessive control of this film and the character of Harry Caul, the wiretapper in Coppola’s The Conversation (1974), who cared only about technical results and refused to let himself think about human consequences." Later critical evaluation has been more positive; Thomson calls the film "enchanting and touching". One from the Heart starred Forrest, Teri Garr, Raúl Juliá, Nastassja Kinski and was scored by Tom Waits with Crystal Gayle singing on many tracks with Waits.

In 1983, he directed The Outsiders, an adaptation of the novel of the same name by S. E. Hinton. Coppola credited his inspiration for making the film to a suggestion from middle school students who had read the novel. The Outsiders is notable for being the breakout film for a number of young actors who would go on to become major stars, including Matt Dillon, Ralph Macchio and C. Thomas Howell. Also in the cast were Patrick Swayze, Emilio Estevez, Diane Lane, Tom Cruise and Rob Lowe (in his film debut). Carmine Coppola wrote and edited the score, including the title song "Stay Gold", which was based on Robert Frost's "Nothing Gold Can Stay" and performed by Stevie Wonder. The Outsiders received mostly positive reviews from critics and performed well at the box office, grossing $25.7 million on a $10 million budget.

He directed Rumble Fish, filmed at the same time as The Outsiders on-location in Tulsa, Oklahoma and based on the novel of the same name by Hinton, who co-wrote the screenplay. Shot in black-and-white as an homage to German expressionism, Rumble Fish centers on the relationship between a revered former gang leader (Mickey Rourke) and his younger brother, Rusty James (Dillon). The film received positive reviews from critics but bombed at the box office, earning a meager $2.5 million against a $10 million budget.

In 1984, Coppola directed the Robert Evans-produced The Cotton Club, based on the novel by James Haskins and centered on the eponymous Harlem jazz club. The film was nominated for several awards, including the Golden Globes for Best Director and Best Picture (Drama) and Oscars for Best Film Editing and Best Art-Direction. However, the film failed at the box-office, earning only $25.9 million of the $47.9 million privately invested by brothers Fred and Ed Doumani. The same year, he directed "Rip Van Winkle", an adaptation of Washington Irving's short story starring Harry Dean Stanton for Shelley Duvall's Faerie Tale Theatre.

In 1986, Coppola directed Captain EO, a 17-minute space fantasy for Disney theme parks, executive produced by George Lucas and starring Michael Jackson. Coppola, formerly a member of Writers Guild of America West, left and maintained financial core status in 1986. Also in 1986, Coppola released the comedy Peggy Sue Got Married starring Kathleen Turner, Jim Carrey and Coppola's nephew Nicolas Cage. The film earned Coppola positive reviews and Turner her first and only Oscar nomination. It was Coppola's first box-office success since The Outsiders and ranked number 17 on Entertainment Weekly's list of "50 Best High School Movies". That same year, Coppola appeared on the March 22 episode of Saturday Night Live where he was part of a storyline where NBC hired him to direct the show in an attempt to boost SNL's sagging ratings.

The following year, Coppola re-teamed with James Caan for Gardens of Stone, but the film was overshadowed by the death of Coppola's eldest son Gian-Carlo during the film's production. The movie was not a critical success and underperformed commercially, earning only $5.6 million against a $13 million budget. Coppola directed Tucker: The Man and His Dream the year after that. The film is a biopic based on the life of Preston Tucker and his attempt to produce and market the Tucker '48; Coppola had originally conceived the project as a musical with Brando leading. Ultimately, it was Jeff Bridges who played the role of Tucker. Budgeted at $24 million, the film received positive reviews and earned three nominations at the 62nd Academy Awards, but grossed a disappointing $19.65 million at the box office. It garnered two awards: Martin Landau won the Golden Globe for Best Supporting Actor and Dean Tavoularis took BAFTA's honors for Best Production Design.

In 1989, Coppola teamed up with fellow Oscar-winners Martin Scorsese and Woody Allen for the anthology film New York Stories. Coppola directed the "Life Without Zoë" segment, starring Shire and co-written with his daughter Sofia. "Life Without Zoë" was mostly panned by critics and was generally considered to be the segment that brought the film's overall quality down. Hal Hinson of The Washington Post wrote a particularly scathing review, stating: "It's impossible to know what Francis Coppola's Life Without Zoë is. Co-written with his daughter Sofia, the film is a mystifying embarrassment; it's by far the director's worst work yet." Zoetrope Studios finally filed for Chapter 11 bankruptcy in 1990, after which its name was changed to American Zoetrope.

=== 1990–1999: Continued work ===
==== The Godfather Part III (1990) ====
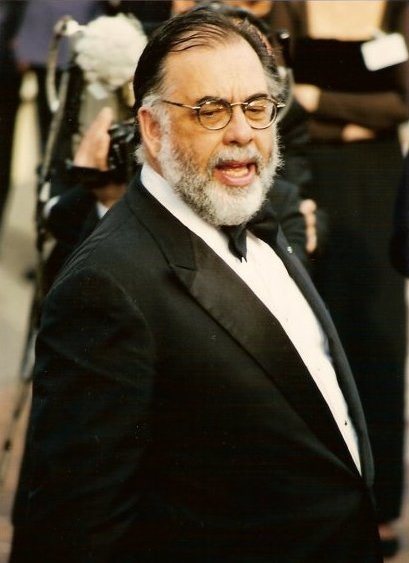
Coppola at the 1996 Cannes Film Festival

In 1990, he released the third and final chapter of The Godfather series: The Godfather Part III. Coppola felt that the first two films had told the complete Corleone saga. Coppola intended Part III to be an epilogue to the first two films. In his audio commentary for Part II, he stated that only a dire financial situation caused by the failure of One from the Heart (1982) compelled him to take up Paramount's long-standing offer to make a third installment. Coppola and Puzo preferred the title The Death of Michael Corleone, but Paramount Pictures found that unacceptable. While not as critically acclaimed as the first two films, it was still commercially successful, earning $136 million against a $54 million budget. Some reviewers criticized the casting of Coppola's daughter Sofia, who had stepped into the leading role of Mary Corleone after it had been abandoned by Winona Ryder just as filming began. Despite this, The Godfather Part III went on to gather seven Academy Award nominations, including Best Director and Best Picture. The film failed to win any of these awards, which made it the only film in the trilogy to do so.

In September 2020, for the film's 30th anniversary, it was announced that a new cut of the film titled Mario Puzo's The Godfather, Coda: The Death of Michael Corleone would have a limited theatrical release in December 2020 followed by digital and Blu-ray. Coppola said the film is the version he and Puzo had originally envisioned, and it "vindicates" its status among the trilogy and his daughter Sofia's performance.

==== Bram Stoker's Dracula (1992) ====
In 1992, Coppola directed and produced Bram Stoker's Dracula. Adapted from Bram Stoker's novel, it was intended to follow the book more closely than previous film adaptations. Coppola cast Gary Oldman as the titular role, with Keanu Reeves, Winona Ryder, and Anthony Hopkins in supporting roles. The movie became a box-office hit, grossing $82,522,790 domestically, making it the 15th highest-grossing film of the year. It fared even better out of the country, grossing $133,339,902 for a total worldwide gross of $215,862,692 against a budget of $40 million, making it the ninth highest-grossing film of the year worldwide. The film won Academy Awards for Costume Design, Makeup and Sound Editing.

==== Jack (1996) ====
Coppola's next project was Jack, which was released on August 9, 1996. It starred Robin Williams as Jack Powell, a ten-year-old boy whose cells are growing at four times the normal rate due to Werner syndrome, which makes him look like a 40-year-old man at the age of ten. With Diane Lane, Brian Kerwin, and Bill Cosby, Jack also featured Jennifer Lopez, Fran Drescher and Michael McKean in supporting roles. Not a box-office success, grossing $58 million domestically on an estimated $45 million budget, it was panned by critics, many of whom disliked the film's abrupt contrast between actual comedy and tragic melodrama. It was also unfavorably compared with the 1988 film Big, in which Tom Hanks also played a child in a grown man's body. Most critics felt that the screenplay was poorly written, not funny, and had unconvincing and unbelievable drama. Other critics felt that Coppola was too talented to be making this type of film. Although ridiculed for making the film, Coppola has defended it, saying he is not ashamed of the final cut of the movie. He had been friends with Robin Williams for many years and had always wanted to work with him as an actor. When Williams was offered the screenplay for Jack, he said he would only agree to do it if Coppola agreed to sign on as director.

==== The Rainmaker (1997) ====
The last film Coppola directed in the 1990s, The Rainmaker, was based on the 1995 novel of the same name by John Grisham. An ensemble courtroom drama, the film was well received by critics. Roger Ebert gave The Rainmaker three stars out of four, remarking: "I have enjoyed several of the movies based on Grisham novels ... but I've usually seen the storyteller's craft rather than the novelist's art being reflected. By keeping all of the little people in focus, Coppola shows the variety of a young lawyer's life, where every client is necessary and most of them need a lot more than a lawyer." James Berardinelli also gave the film three stars out of four, saying that "the intelligence and subtlety of The Rainmaker took me by surprise" and that the film "stands above any other filmed Grisham adaptation." Grisham said of the film: "To me it's the best adaptation of any of [my books] ... I love the movie. It's so well done." The film grossed about $45 million domestically, more than the estimated production budget of $40 million, but a disappointment compared to previous films adapted from Grisham novels.

According to Coppola, after this film, he stopped working as a "professional director", preferring to act more like a student. He chose to self-finance some "very small, low-budget" movies in order to learn "what making movies really was" without needing them to be successful.

=== 1998–2015: Independent films and career fluctuations ===
==== Supernova re-edit ====
In the late 90's Coppola was a board member of MGM, and in discussion of films they already had which could not be released, Supernova was among the most expensive. He was approached to supervise several of these, including The Fantastiks and Supernova, which he used his American Zoetrope facility in Northern California. This work included digitally placing Angela Bassett's and James Spader's faces on the bodies of (a computer-tinted) Robin Tunney and Peter Facinelli so that their characters could have a love scene. However, Coppola's re-edited version had negative test screening and did not get the PG-13 rating by the MPAA that the studio wanted. Creature designer Patrick Tatopoulos, whose special effects were mostly cut out from the film, said that Walter Hill wanted the film to be much more grotesque, strange, and disturbing, while MGM wanted to make it more of a hip, sexy film in space, and not with full-blown makeup effects. "I hope that my experience in the film industry has helped improve the picture and rectified some of the problems that losing a director caused", said Coppola. By October 1999, MGM decided to sell the film. The film was eventually released on January 17, 2000, almost two years later than planned.

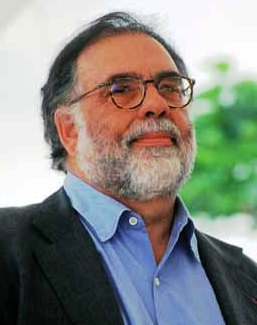
Coppola at the 2001 Cannes Film Festival

Coppola was the jury president at the 1996 Cannes Film Festival and he also took part as a special guest at the 17th Midnight Sun Film Festival in Sodankylä, Finland, and the 46th International Thessaloniki Film Festival in Thessaloniki, Greece.

==== Apocalypse Now Redux ====
In the late '90s, Coppola began revisiting his films and creating new director's cuts for release on home video. The first movie to receive this treatment was Apocalypse Now. The new version, Apocalypse Now Redux, restored 49 minutes that had been cut from the film before its original release in 1979, notably a visit to a French plantation. A number of actors came in to rerecord their lines for the deleted scenes, which were of inconsistent audio quality, and new music was composed. This version was released in cinemas in 2001 and later released on DVD. In 2006, it was collected with the theatrical cut on a deluxe DVD; subsequent home video releases have included both versions.

A. O. Scott wrote: "Apocalypse Now Redux arrives in this slack season to remind us of a lost era of visionary cinema, a time of creative self-confidence that frequently flirted with hubris, but also a time of risk taking and high seriousness. The artistic vision on display in Apocalypse Now -- the divine madness that inspired Mr. Coppola to risk his health, his sanity, his fortune and the well-being of his cast, crew and family -- is ultimately less impressive, and less important to the film's durable power, than the art itself."

In 2005, Coppola created a new cut of The Outsiders for home video. This version, titled The Outsiders: The Complete Novel, added more than 20 minutes of footage and removed three scenes, bringing the film's runtime from 91 minutes to 114 minutes. It also added new music by Michael Seifert and Dave Pruitt and several period songs to Carmine Coppola's score. Coppola included both the theatrical cut and "The Complete Novel" on all subsequent home video releases.

==== Return ====
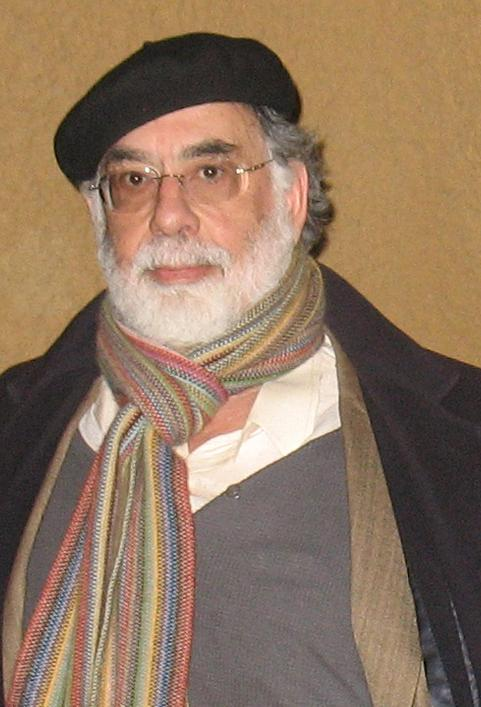
Coppola in 2007

After a ten-year hiatus, Coppola returned to directing with Youth Without Youth in 2007, based on the novella of the same name by Romanian author Mircea Eliade. The film received generally negative reviews from critics. It was made for about $19 million and had a limited release, only managing $2,624,759 at the box-office. As a result, Coppola announced his plans to produce his own films in order to avoid the marketing input that goes into most films, which are intended to appeal to too wide an audience.

In 2009, Coppola released Tetro. It was set in Argentina, with the reunion of two brothers. The story follows the rivalries born out of creative differences passed down through generations of an artistic Italian immigrant family. The film received generally positive reviews from critics. The Rotten Tomatoes site's consensus was: "A complex meditation on family dynamics, Tetro's arresting visuals and emotional core compensate for its uneven narrative." Roger Ebert of the Chicago Sun-Times gave the film three stars, praising it for being "boldly operatic, involving family drama, secrets, generations at war, melodrama, romance and violence", Ebert also praised Vincent Gallo's performance and claimed that Alden Ehrenreich is "the new Leonardo DiCaprio". Todd McCarthy of Variety gave the film a B+, judging that "when Coppola finds creative nirvana, he frequently has trouble delivering the full goods". Richard Corliss of Time gave the film a mixed review, praising Ehrenreich's performance, but claiming Coppola "has made a movie in which plenty happens, but nothing rings true". The film made $2,636,774 worldwide, against a budget of $5,000,000.

Twixt, starring Val Kilmer, Elle Fanning, Joanne Whalley, and Bruce Dern, and narrated by Tom Waits, was released to film festivals in late 2011 and was released theatrically in early 2012. It received critical acclaim in France, but mostly negative reviews elsewhere.

In 2015, Coppola stated

That's why I ended my career: I decided I didn't want to make what you could call 'factory movies' anymore. I would rather just experiment with the form, and see what I could do, and [make things] that came out of my own. And little by little, the commercial film industry went into the superhero business, and everything was on such a scale. The budgets were so big, because they wanted to make the big series of films where they could make two or three parts. I felt I was no longer interested enough to put in the extraordinary effort a film takes [nowadays].

Distant Vision is a semi-autobiographical unfinished live broadcast project created in real-time. Proof of concepts were tested before limited audiences at Oklahoma City Community College in June 2015 and UCLA School of Theater in July 2016.

==== Further director's cuts ====
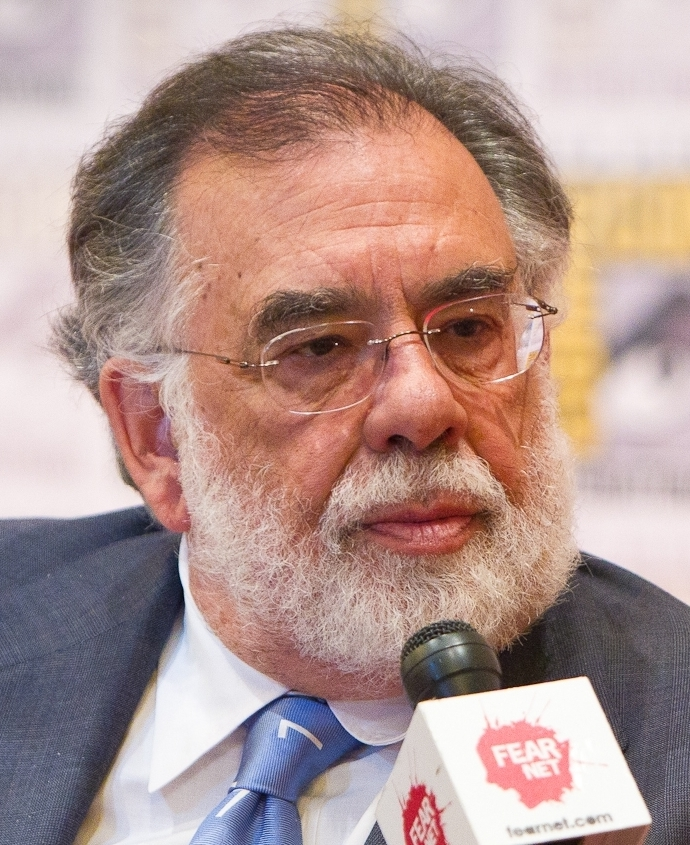
Coppola in 2011

In 2015, Coppola found an old Betamax tape with his original cut of The Cotton Club and decided to restore it. He had cut about a half hour out of the film before its original release at the insistence of the film's European financial backers. Due to a combination of music rights, the loss of the original negative, audio issues, and MGM's lack of interest in the project, Coppola spent $500,000 of his own money restoring the film. It was finally finished in 2017 and premiered at the Telluride Film Festival in 2019 as The Cotton Club Encore.

After finishing work on The Cotton Club, Coppola began work on a director's cut of his first movie, Dementia 13. For this film, Coppola removed several minutes of footage that had been added by the film's producer, Roger Corman. In 2019, he followed it up with another director's cut of Apocalypse Now, this time called "The Final Cut". It removed 20 minutes of footage that had been included in Apocalypse Now Redux and restored the film from the original negative for the first time.

In December 2020, a re-edit of Godfather III, The Godfather Coda: The Death of Michael Corleone had a limited theatrical release, followed by digital and Blu-ray release in 2021. Coppola stated that The Godfather: Part IV was never made because Mario Puzo died before they had a chance to write the film. Andy García has since claimed the film's script was nearly produced.

Coppola's most recent director's cut to date was B'Twixt Now and Sunrise, a shortened version of his film Twixt. It was given a select re-release in 2022.

At the 94th Academy Awards, they celebrated the 50th anniversary of The Godfather. Coppola attended alongside Robert De Niro and Al Pacino who were greeted with a standing ovation.

=== 2016–present ===
==== Megalopolis (2024) ====
In April 2019, Coppola announced that he planned to direct Megalopolis, which he had been developing for many years prior. Speaking to Deadline, he said: "I plan this year to begin my longstanding ambition to make a major work utilizing all I have learned during my long career, beginning at age 16 doing theater, and that will be an epic on a grand scale, which I've titled Megalopolis."

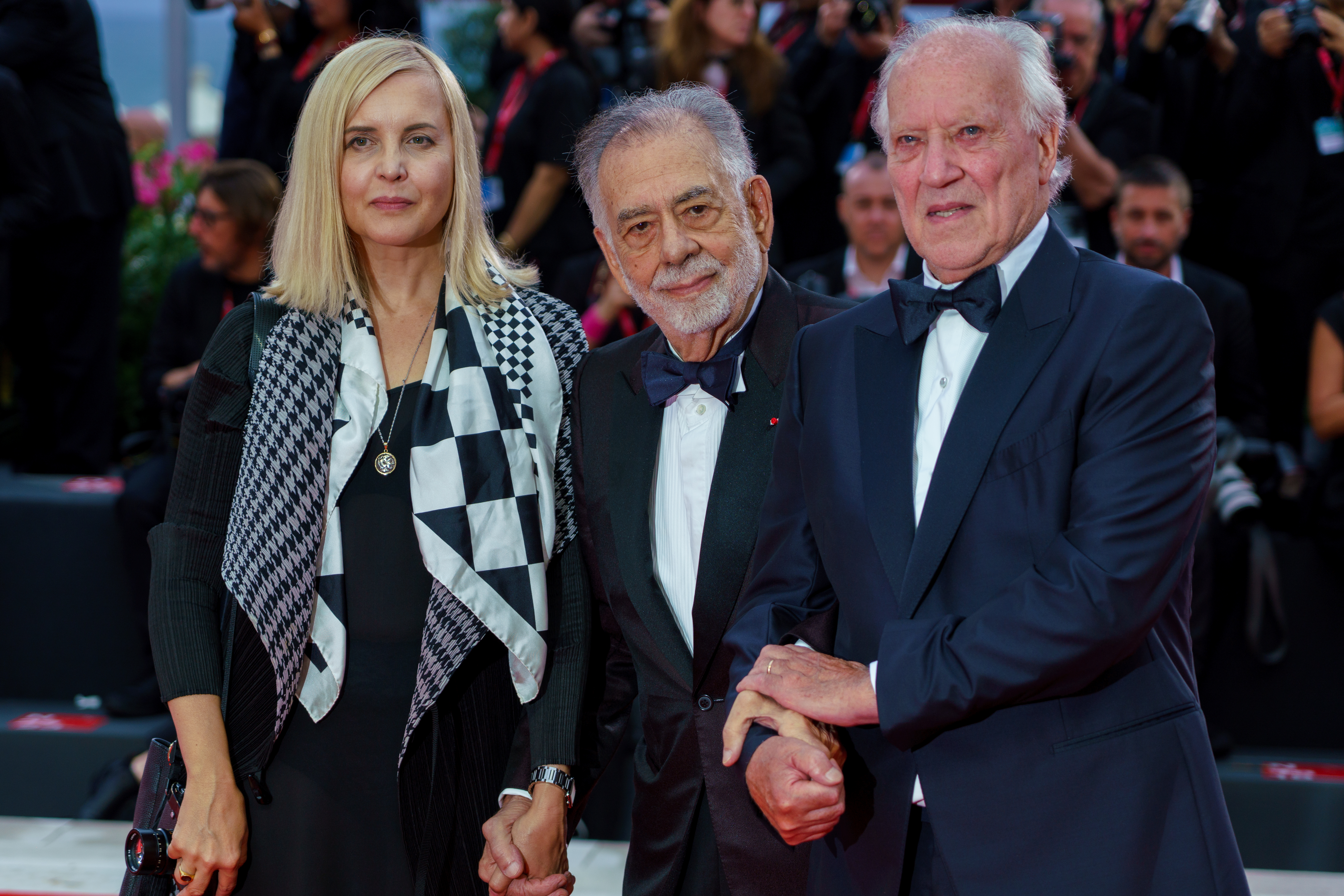
Coppola (center) with Lena and Werner Herzog attending the "La Grazia" red carpet during the 82nd Venice International Film Festival

He had planned to direct the movie, a story about the aftermath and reconstruction of New York City after a mega-disaster, many years earlier, but after the real-life disaster of the September 11 attacks, the project was seen as being too sensitive.

In August 2021, it was announced that Coppola had begun discussions with actors for the project and that he was aiming to begin principal photography in the fall of 2022. In April 2022, it was reported that filming was to take place from September 6, 2022, to February 2, 2023. In May 2022, the star cast was revealed: Adam Driver, Forest Whitaker, Nathalie Emmanuel, Jon Voight, and Laurence Fishburne. In July, it was reported that filming would instead begin in November 2022 at Trilith Studios in Fayetteville, Georgia. In August, it was revealed that Aubrey Plaza, Talia Shire, Shia LaBeouf, Jason Schwartzman, Kathryn Hunter, Laurence Fishburne, James Remar, and Grace VanderWaal joined the cast. In early October, it was announced that Chloe Fineman, Dustin Hoffman, Bailey Ives, Isabelle Kusman, and D.B. Sweeney would also be joining the cast.

On February 29, 2024, Deadline reported that Megalopolis will be released in IMAX in Fall 2024. On April 9, 2024, it was revealed that Megalopolis would be premiering in competition at the 77th Cannes Film Festival.

==== Future projects ====
In August 2024, one month ahead of the release of Megalopolis, Coppola told Rolling Stone that he is not going to retire after his longtime passion project's release, intending to work on two projects: an adaptation of The Glimpses of the Moon with "strong dance and musical elements" he plans to produce in England and Distant Vision, a "live cinema" project he has been working on since 2015 that tells the fictionalized story of three generations within an Italian American family during the phenomenon of television's invention.

== Commercial ventures ==
=== American Zoetrope ===
In 1971, Coppola produced George Lucas' first feature film, THX 1138. Shortly after completion of production they brought the finished film to Warner Bros., along with several other scripts for potential projects at their newly founded company, American Zoetrope. However, studio executives strongly disliked all of the scripts, including THX, and demanded that Coppola repay the $300,000 they had loaned him for the Zoetrope studio, as well as insisting on cutting five minutes from the film. The debt nearly closed Zoetrope and forced Coppola to reluctantly focus on The Godfather. American Zoetrope produced the film Clownhouse, the director of which, Victor Salva, was convicted of child sexual abuse and child pornography offences occurring during the making of that film. In 2006, Coppola said, "You have to remember, while this was a tragedy, that the difference in age between Victor and the boy was very small -- Victor was practically a child himself." Salva was 29 at the time while the boy was 12.

==== Zoetrope Virtual Studio ====
American Zoetrope also administers the Zoetrope Virtual Studio, a complete motion picture production studio for members only. Launched in June 2000 as the culmination of more than four years of work, it brings together departments for screenwriters, directors, producers and other filmmaker artists, as well as new departments for other creative endeavors such as the short story vending machine project.

==== Pinocchio dispute with Warner Bros. ====
In the late 1980s, Coppola started considering concepts for a motion picture based upon the 19th-century Carlo Collodi novel The Adventures of Pinocchio, and in 1991, Coppola and Warner Bros. began discussing the project as well as two others, one involving the life of J. Edgar Hoover and the other based on the children's novel The Secret Garden. These discussions led to negotiations for Coppola to both produce and direct the Pinocchio project for Warner Bros. as well as The Secret Garden (which was made in 1993 and produced by American Zoetrope, but directed by Agnieszka Holland) and Hoover, which never came to fruition. A film was eventually made by Clint Eastwood in 2011 titled J. Edgar, which was distributed by Warner Bros.

However, in mid-1991, Coppola and Warner Bros. came to a disagreement over the compensation to Coppola for his directing services on Pinocchio. In 1994, Coppola later approached another studio, Columbia Pictures, to produce the film. Warner Brothers then wrote to Columbia, stating it had held the rights to Coppola's project, which led to Columbia later dropping the project. Coppola filed a lawsuit against Warner Bros, alleging they had wrongfully prevented Columbia Pictures from making the film.

The parties deferred this issue and a settlement was finally reached on July 3, 1998, when the jurors in the resultant court case awarded Coppola $20 million as compensation for losing the Pinocchio film project. On that same day, Warner Bros. stated it would appeal the decision. A week later, Coppola was awarded a further $60 million in punitive damages on top, stemming from his charges that Warner Bros. sabotaged his intended version. However, in October 1998, then-Superior Court Judge Madeleine Flier reversed the jury's $60 million award to Coppola. Warner Bros. and Coppola then appealed each other's ruling, in which Coppola sought to have his $60 million award restored. In March 2001, the California Court of Appeals decided against Coppola on both counts. In July 2001, the California Supreme Court refused to hear the appellate decision, bringing the litigation battle to a conclusive end.

==== Contact dispute with Carl Sagan/Warner Bros. ====
During the filming of Contact on December 28, 1996, Coppola filed a lawsuit against Carl Sagan and Warner Bros. Sagan had died a week earlier, and Coppola claimed that Sagan's novel Contact was based on a story the pair had developed for a television special back in 1975 titled First Contact. Under their development agreement, Coppola and Sagan were to split proceeds from the project as well as any novel Sagan would write with American Zoetrope and Children's Television Workshop Productions. The television program was never produced, but in 1985, Simon & Schuster published Sagan's Contact and Warner Bros. moved forward with development of a film adaptation. Coppola sought at least $250,000 in compensatory damages and an injunction against production or distribution of the film. Even though Sagan was shown to have violated some of the terms of the agreement, the case was dismissed in February 1998 because Coppola had waited too long to file suit.

=== Uptown Theater ===
George Altamura, a real estate developer, announced in 2003 that he had partnered with several people, including Coppola, in a project to restore the Uptown Theater in downtown Napa, California, in order to create a live entertainment venue.

=== Francis Ford Coppola Presents ===
Coppola is the owner of Francis Ford Coppola Presents, a lifestyle brand under which he markets goods from companies he owns or controls. It includes films and videos, resorts, cafes, a literary magazine, a line of pastas and pasta sauces called Mammarella Foods, and a winery.

=== Wineries ===
==== Francis Ford Coppola Winery ====
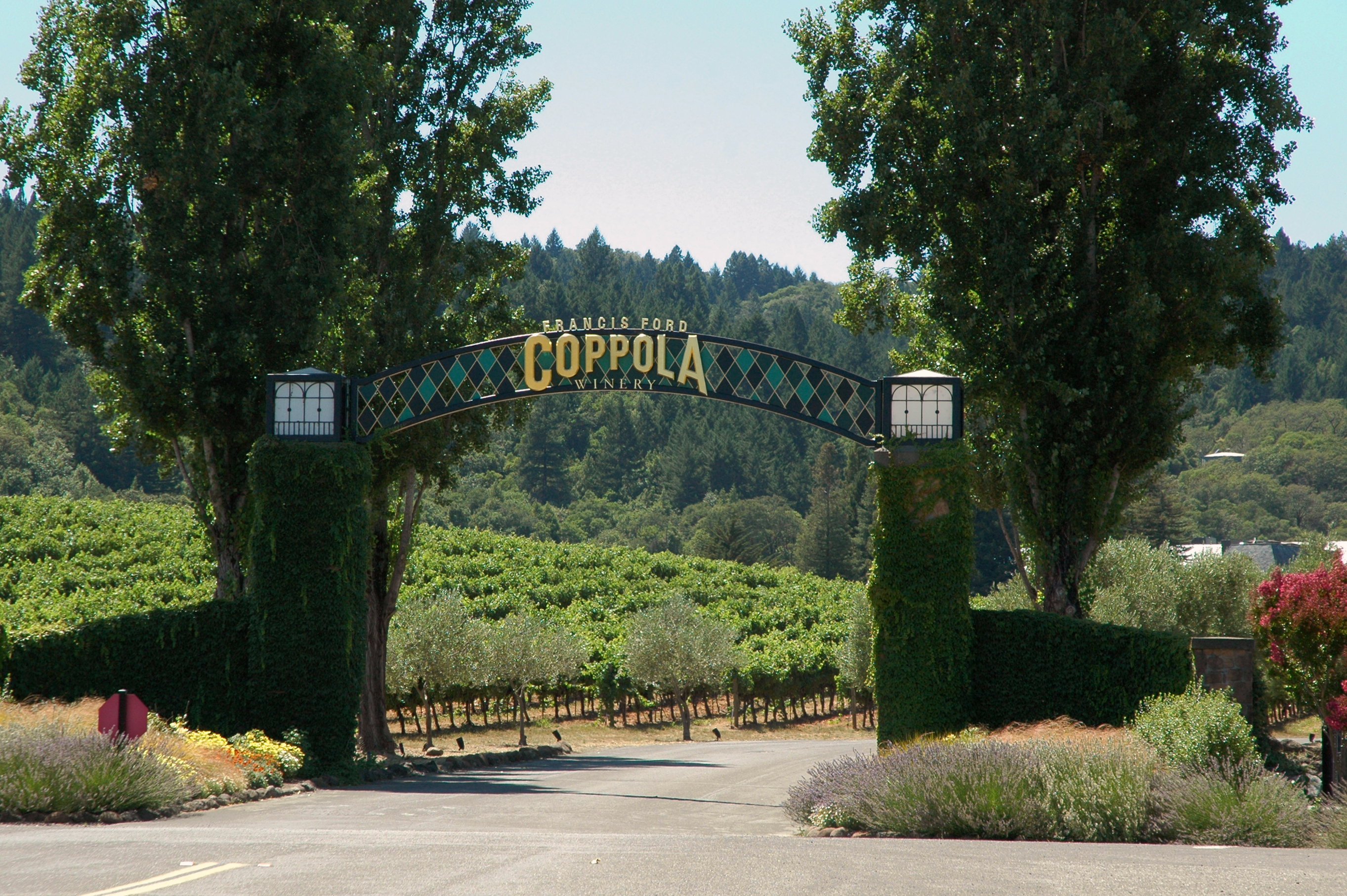
Coppola's Winery entrance gate in 2011

The Francis Ford Coppola Winery between Healdsburg and Geyserville, California, located on the former Chateau Souverain Winery, where he has opened a family-friendly facility, is influenced by the idea of the Tivoli Gardens in Copenhagen, with swimming pools, bocce courts, and a restaurant named Rustic. The winery displays several of Coppola's Oscars along with memorabilia from his movies, including Vito Corleone's desk from The Godfather and a restored 1948 Tucker Sedan as used in Tucker: The Man and His Dream.

In August 2021, Coppola sold Francis Ford Coppola Winery and Virginia Dare Winery to Delicato Family Wines.

==== Inglenook Winery ====
Coppola, with his family, expanded his business ventures to include winemaking in California's Napa Valley, when in 1975, he purchased the former home and adjoining vineyard of Gustave Niebaum in Rutherford, California using proceeds from The Godfather. His winery produced its first vintage in 1977 with the help of his father, wife, and children stomping the grapes barefoot. Every year, the family has a harvest party to continue the tradition.

After purchasing the property, he produced wine under the Niebaum-Coppola label. He purchased the former Inglenook Winery chateau in 1995, and renamed it to Rubicon Estate Winery in 2006. On April 11, 2011, Coppola acquired the Inglenook trademark paying more, he said, for the trademark than he did for the entire estate and announced that the estate would once again be known by its historic original name, Inglenook. Its grapes are entirely organically grown.

==== Domaine Lumineux ====
In October 2018, Coppola and family purchased the Vista Hills winery in Dayton, Oregon, and in 2019 renamed it to Domaine de Broglie, which is now Domaine Lumineux after relocating to Newberg, Oregon in 2024.

=== Resorts ===
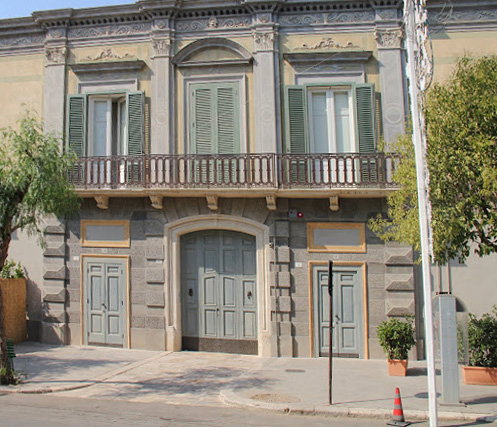
Palazzo Margherita in Bernalda, owned by Coppola

Included in the Francis Ford Coppola Presents lifestyle brand are several hotels and resorts, part of Coppola's Hideaway company. The Blancaneaux Lodge in Belize, which from the early 1980s was a family retreat until it was opened to the public in 1993 as a 20-room luxury resort and The Turtle Inn, in Placencia, Belize, (both of which have won several prestigious awards including "Travel + Leisure's World's Best: Best Resort in Central & South America"); La Lancha in Lago Petén Itzá, Guatemala; Jardín Escondido in Buenos Aires, Argentina; Palazzo Margherita in Bernalda, Italy; and the All-Movie Hotel in Peachtree City, Georgia, US.

=== Cafe and restaurant ===
In San Francisco, Coppola owns a restaurant named Cafe Zoetrope, located in the Sentinel Building where American Zoetrope is based. It serves traditional Italian cuisine and wine from his personal estate vineyard. For 14 years from 1994, Coppola co-owned the Rubicon restaurant in San Francisco along with Robin Williams and Robert De Niro. Rubicon closed in August 2008.

=== Literary publications ===
Coppola bought into the San Francisco-based magazine City of San Francisco in 1973, with the intent of publishing a "service magazine" that informed readers about sights and activities in selected cities. The magazine was unsuccessful, and he lost $1.5 million on this venture.

In 1997, Coppola co-founded with Adrienne Brodeur, the literary magazine Zoetrope: All-Story which was devoted to short stories and design. The magazine publishes fiction by emerging writers alongside more recognizable names, such as Woody Allen, Margaret Atwood, Haruki Murakami, Alice Munro, Don DeLillo, Mary Gaitskill, and Edward Albee; as well as essays, including ones from Mario Vargas Llosa, David Mamet, Steven Spielberg, and Salman Rushdie. Each issue is designed, in its entirety, by a prominent artist, one usually working outside his / her expected field. Previous guest designers include Gus Van Sant, Tom Waits, Laurie Anderson, Marjane Satrapi, Guillermo del Toro, David Bowie, David Byrne, and Dennis Hopper. Coppola serves as founding editor and publisher of All-Story.

=== Cannabis brand ===
In 2018, Coppola launched Sana Company LLC and released a cannabis brand known as The Grower's Series. The collection was created in partnership with the Humboldt Brothers, a Humboldt County cannabis farm. Coppola debuted the brand in San Francisco, California in October 2018 at the private cannabis dining club series known as Thursday Infused, organized by The Herb Somm, Jamie Evans. Coppola packaged The Grower's Series in a mock black tin wine bottle resembling his wine brand. The Grower's Series showcases three cannabis strains: a sativa, indica and hybrid.

=== Whisky advertisement ===
Coppola appeared in a commercial for Suntory Reserve in 1980 alongside Akira Kurosawa; the commercial was filmed while Kurosawa was making Kagemusha, which Coppola produced with George Lucas.

== Personal life ==
=== Family ===
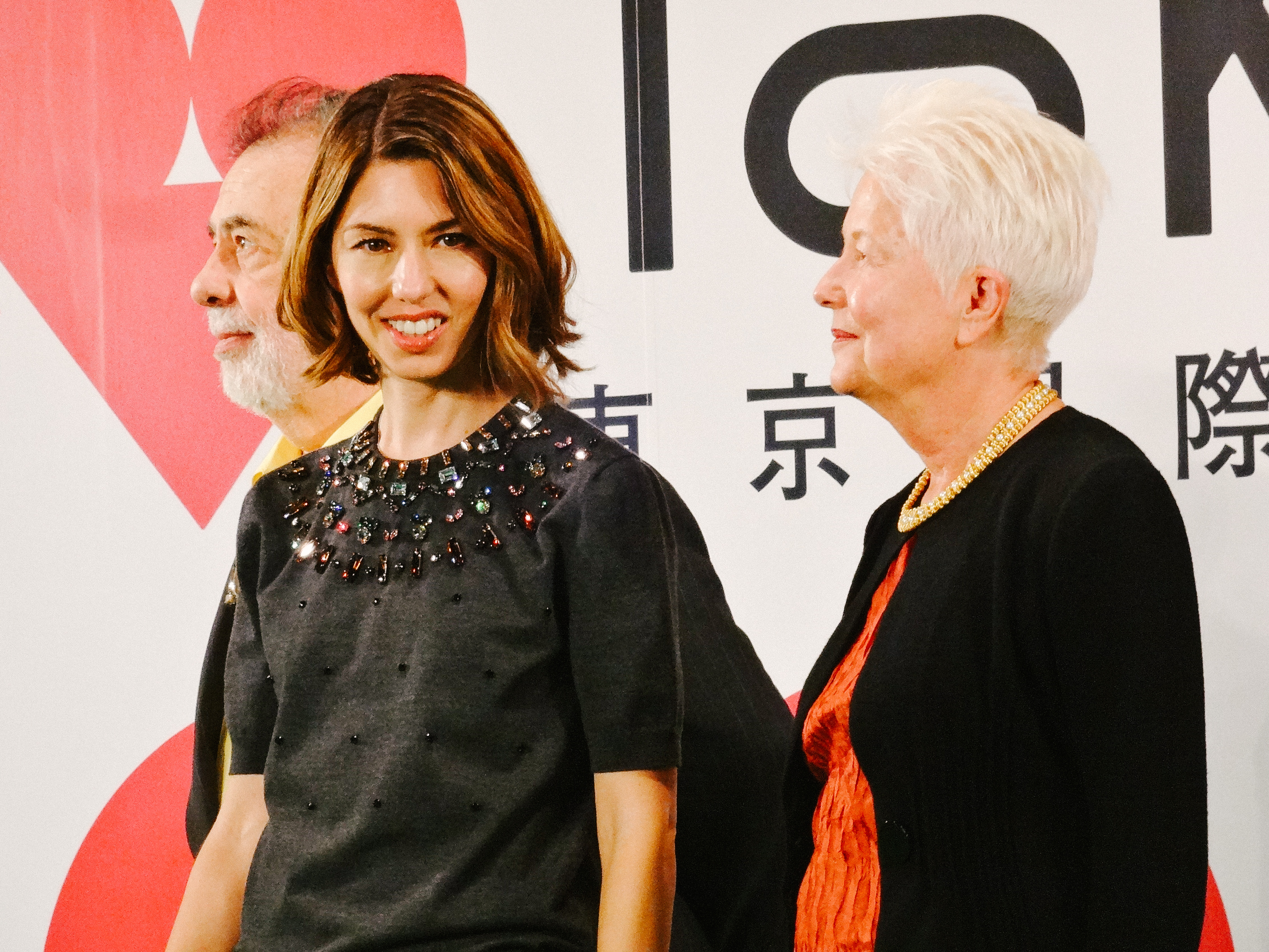
Coppola (left) with his wife Eleanor (right) and daughter Sofia (center) at the 26th Tokyo International Film Festival

In 1963, Coppola married writer and documentary filmmaker Eleanor Jessie Neil. She went on to co-direct Hearts of Darkness: A Filmmaker's Apocalypse. Together they had three children: Gian-Carlo, Roman, and Sofia, all of whom became filmmakers. Gian-Carlo died in 1986 at the age of 22 in a speedboating accident. He had one child, Gia Coppola, also a filmmaker. Radio personality Marc Coppola; filmmaker Christopher Coppola; TV writer and film producer Matthew Orlando Shire; and actors Nicolas Cage and Robert & Jason Schwartzman are Coppola's nephews. He had an extramarital affair with Melissa Mathison—who would later write E.T. the Extra-Terrestrial—that began when she was his assistant on The Godfather Part II and lasted through the making of Apocalypse Now, nearly leading to Coppola's divorce.

Eleanor Coppola died on April 12, 2024, at the age of 87.

=== Politics ===
During the 1980 United States presidential election, Coppola filmed a mass televised rally for California Governor and Democratic Party presidential candidate Jerry Brown at the Wisconsin State Capitol in Madison. The rally failed in its goal to draw attention away from the other Democratic primary candidates, then-incumbent U.S. president Jimmy Carter and U.S. Senator Ted Kennedy, forcing Brown to drop out of the race. Over the years, Coppola has worked with several Democratic political candidates, including Mike Thompson and Nancy Pelosi for the U.S. House of Representatives, and Barbara Boxer and Alan Cranston for the U.S. Senate.

== Misconduct allegations ==
In 2024, Coppola was accused of sexual misconduct on the set of Megalopolis dating to 2023, as reported in a Variety story with video evidence. One background actor in the film sued Coppola in a Georgia court. Coppola subsequently sued Variety for libel. The publication filed a countersuit under anti-SLAPP legislation, and while their case was initially dismissed, a California appeals court ruled in their favor, dismissing Coppola's libel lawsuit in September 2026.

== Favorite films ==
In 2012, Coppola participated in the Sight and Sound directors' poll. It is held every ten years to select the greatest films of all time, by asking contemporary directors to select ten films of their choice.

Coppola's selections were:

- The Apartment (United States, 1960)
- Ashes and Diamonds (Poland, 1958)
- The Bad Sleep Well (Japan, 1960)
- The Best Years of Our Lives (United States, 1946)
- I Vitelloni (Italy, 1953)
- The King of Comedy (United States, 1983)
- Raging Bull (United States, 1980)
- Singin' in the Rain (United States, 1952)
- Sunrise (United States, 1927)
- Yojimbo (Japan, 1961)

== Filmography ==
Directed features
Year	Title	Distributor
1963	Dementia 13	American International Pictures
1966	You're a Big Boy Now	Warner Bros.-Seven Arts
1968	Finian's Rainbow	Warner Bros.-Seven Arts
1969	The Rain People	Warner Bros.-Seven Arts
1972	The Godfather	Paramount Pictures
1974	The Conversation	Paramount Pictures
1974	The Godfather Part II	Paramount Pictures
1979	Apocalypse Now	United Artists
1982	One from the Heart	Columbia Pictures
1983	The Outsiders	Warner Bros.
1983	Rumble Fish	Universal Pictures
1984	The Cotton Club	Orion Pictures
1986	Peggy Sue Got Married	TriStar Pictures
1987	Gardens of Stone	TriStar Pictures
1988	Tucker: The Man and His Dream	Paramount Pictures
1990	The Godfather Part III	Paramount Pictures
1992	Bram Stoker's Dracula	Columbia Pictures
1996	Jack	Buena Vista Pictures
1997	The Rainmaker	Paramount Pictures
2007	Youth Without Youth	Sony Pictures Classics
2009	Tetro	American Zoetrope
2011	Twixt	20th Century Fox Home Entertainment
2024	Megalopolis	Lionsgate Films

== Awards and honors ==
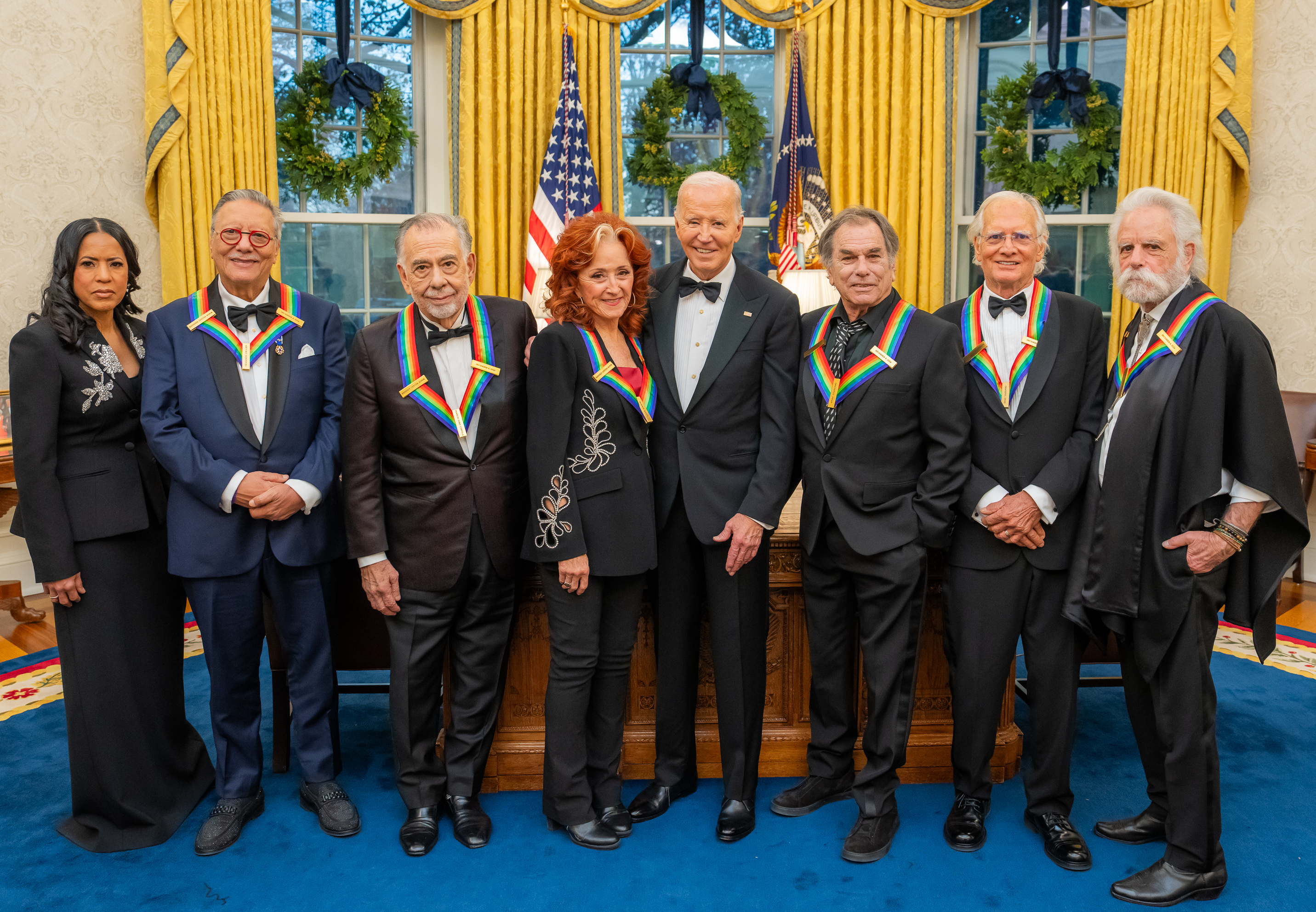
From left to right: Kennedy Center Honorees Michelle Ebanks, Arturo Sandoval, Coppola, Bonnie Raitt, Mickey Hart, Bill Kreutzmann, and Bobby Weir with President Joe Biden (fifth from left) in the Oval Office of the White House, 2024

For The Godfather Part II and The Conversation, Coppola was the third director to have two nominations for Best Picture in the same year. Victor Fleming was the first, with Gone with the Wind and The Wizard of Oz in 1939; Alfred Hitchcock repeated the feat the next year with Foreign Correspondent and Rebecca. Since Coppola, two other directors have done the same: Herbert Ross with The Goodbye Girl and The Turning Point in 1977 and Steven Soderbergh with Erin Brockovich and Traffic in 2000. He is one of ten directors to receive the Palme d'Or twice, for The Conversation and Apocalypse Now.

In 2022, Coppola received a star on the Hollywood Walk of Fame. On October 15, 2024, after having received the statue of the Capitoline Wolf, Rome's highest honor, a street in the same Italian capital city was named after him as a further sign of the connection between the filmmaker and the city. In 2024, he was honored by the Kennedy Center. Introducing him, his friend George Lucas said: “What Francis does creatively is jump off cliffs. When you spend enough time with Francis, you begin to believe you can jump off cliffs, too.” He received the AFI Life Achievement Award in April 2025.

Awards and nominations received for films directed by Coppola
Year	Title	Academy Awards		BAFTA Awards		Golden Globe Awards	
Year	Title	Nominations	Wins	Nominations	Wins	Nominations	Wins
1966	You're a Big Boy Now	1		1		3	
1968	Finian's Rainbow	2				5	
1972	The Godfather	10	3	5	1	7	6
1974	The Conversation	3		5	2	4	
1974	The Godfather Part II	11	6	4	1	6	
1979	Apocalypse Now	8	2	9	2	4	3
1982	One from the Heart	1					
1983	Rumble Fish					1	
1984	The Cotton Club	2		2	1	2	
1986	Peggy Sue Got Married	3				2	
1988	Tucker: The Man and His Dream	3		1	1	1	1
1990	The Godfather Part III	7				7	
1992	Bram Stoker's Dracula	4	3	4			
1997	The Rainmaker					1	
Total		55	14	31	8	42	10

Directed Academy Award performances
Under Coppola's direction, these actors have received Academy Award wins and nominations for their performances in their respective roles.

Year	Performer	Film	Result
Academy Award for Best Actor
1972	Marlon Brando	The Godfather	Won
1974	Al Pacino	The Godfather Part II	Nominated
Academy Award for Best Actress
1986	Kathleen Turner	Peggy Sue Got Married	Nominated
Academy Award for Best Supporting Actor
1972	James Caan	The Godfather	Nominated
1972	Robert Duvall	The Godfather	Nominated
1972	Al Pacino	The Godfather	Nominated
1974	Robert De Niro	The Godfather Part II	Won
1974	Michael V. Gazzo	The Godfather Part II	Nominated
1974	Lee Strasberg	The Godfather Part II	Nominated
1979	Robert Duvall	Apocalypse Now	Nominated
1988	Martin Landau	Tucker: The Man and His Dream	Nominated
1990	Andy Garcia	The Godfather Part III	Nominated
Academy Award for Best Supporting Actress
1966	Geraldine Page	You're a Big Boy Now	Nominated
1974	Talia Shire	The Godfather Part II	Nominated

== Bibliography ==
- Coppola and Eiko on Bram Stoker's Dracula (1992), co-authored with Eiko Ishioka
- The Godfather Notebook (2016)
- Live Cinema and Its Techniques (2017)

== See also ==
- Coppola family tree
- List of wine personalities
- List of celebrities who own wineries and vineyards
- List of oldest and youngest Academy Award winners and nominees – Youngest winners for Best Director

== Works cited ==
- Chown, Jeffrey (May 1988). Hollywood Auteur: Francis Coppola. Praeger Publishers. ISBN 978-0-275-92910-7.
- Cowie, Peter (1997). The Godfather Book. London: Faber and Faber Limited. ISBN 978-0-571-19011-9.
- Jones, Jenny M. (2007). The Annotated Godfather: The Complete Screenplay. New York: Black Dog & Leventhal. ISBN 978-1-57912-739-8. Archived from the original on October 25, 2015.
- Lebo, Harlan (1997). The Godfather Legacy: The Untold Story of the Making of the Classic Godfather Trilogy. London, England: Simon & Schuster. ISBN 978-0-684-83647-8. Archived from the original on June 5, 2020.
- Lebo, Harlan (2005). The Godfather Legacy: The Untold Story of the Making of the Classic Godfather Trilogy Featuring Never-Before-Published Production Stills. London, England: Simon & Schuster. ISBN 978-0-7432-8777-7. Archived from the original on November 9, 2015.
- Welsh, James M.; Phillips, Gene D.; Hill, Rodney F. (2010). The Francis Ford Coppola Encyclopedia. Lanham, Maryland: Scarecrow Press. ISBN 978-0-8108-7651-4. Archived from the original on March 28, 2017.
