= Jamie Evans =

American cannabis and wine professional

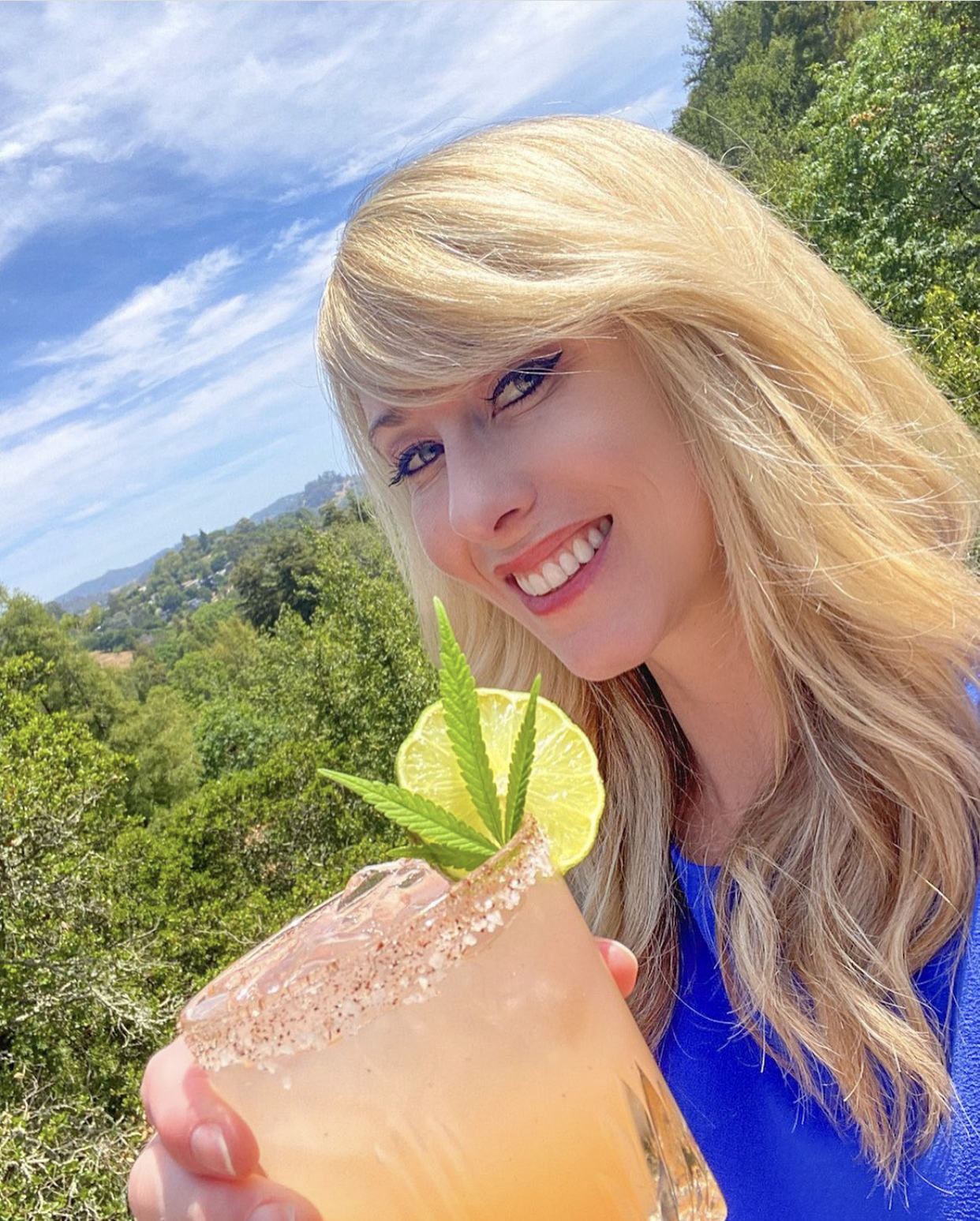
- Education: California Polytechnic State University
- Writing career
- Genre: Non-fiction

Jamie Evans is an American cannabis and wine professional. She's an author, event producer, and creator of the website, The Herb Somm.

== Education ==
Evans studied viticulture at California Polytechnic State University San Luis Obispo. She also studied in the regions of Champagne and Alsace in France before earning the Wine Scholar Guild’s French Wine Scholar certification. In addition, Evans is a Certified Specialist of Wine and Certified Sommelier.

== Career ==
Evans worked in the wine industry before she transitioned to writing about cannabis in 2017. During this time, she created a website called The Herb Somm. A year later, she began hosting cannabis events focused on wine and food pairings. Partnering with different cannabis chefs, she produced a cannabis dinner series known as Thursday Infused, held in San Francisco, California. In 2018, Francis Ford Coppola debuted his cannabis line known as The Grower's Series at a Thursday Infused event.

In 2020, Evans released her first book, The Ultimate Guide to CBD: Explore the World of Cannabidiol and in 2021, her second book, Cannabis Drinks: Secrets to Crafting CBD and THC Beverages at Home, was published. In 2023, Evans co-authored a third book with High Times Magazine titled the Let's Get Baked Cookbook, followed by a fourth book in 2024 titled High Times Cannabis Cocktails: Seasonal Sips & High Teas for Every Occasion. She is also co-editor of The Cooking Journal: A Cannabis Culinary Companion.

Evans is the CEO and co-founder of Herbacée, a non-alcoholic French-inspired cannabis wine brand. In 2025, her company joined Iconic Tonics, a hemp and cannabis-infused beverage company led by Snoop Dogg.

== Recognition ==
In 2018, Evans was named a "Top 40 Under 40 Tastemaker" by Wine Enthusiast magazine and a "SevenFifty Daily Drinks Innovator" by SevenFifty Daily. In 2023, she was named a "Top 40 Under 40" by Marijuana Venture magazine.
