= Distant Vision =

Experimental film project by Francis Ford Coppola

- Directed by: Francis Ford Coppola
- Written by: Francis Ford Coppola
- Produced by: Francis Ford Coppola; Anahid Nazarian; Fred Roos
- Cinematography: Mihai Malaimare Jr.
- Edited by: Robert Schafer
- Production companies: American Zoetrope; Live Cinema
- Release dates: June 5, 2015 (Oklahoma City Community College); July 22, 2016 (UCLA School of Theater)
- Country: United States
- Languages: English; Italian

Distant Vision is an ongoing experimental film project by Francis Ford Coppola. Different versions of this production have been broadcast to limited audiences from the stages of Oklahoma City Community College on June 5, 2015, and at UCLA School of Theater in July 2016.

Coppola led the project as a proof of concept piece for a richer, more in-depth future live broadcast that will recount the struggles and triumphs of three generations of an Italian-American family set against the birth and growth of the invention of television.

== Future ==
In 2024, Coppola planned to film more sequences for Distant Vision, financed with the box office of Megalopolis (2024). The plans were put on hold when Megalopolis grossed a worldwide total of $14.4 million, losing $75.5 million, when factoring together all expenses and revenues.
