= Peggy Sue Got Married =

1986 film by Francis Ford Coppola

- Theatrical release poster
- Directed by: Francis Ford Coppola
- Written by: Jerry Leichtling; Arlene Sarner
- Produced by: Paul R. Gurian
- Starring: Kathleen Turner; Nicolas Cage; Barry Miller; Catherine Hicks
- Cinematography: Jordan Cronenweth
- Edited by: Barry Malkin
- Music by: John Barry
- Production companies: American Zoetrope; Delphi V Productions; Rastar
- Distributed by: Tri-Star Pictures
- Release date: October 10, 1986
- Running time: 103 minutes
- Country: United States
- Language: English
- Budget: $18 million
- Box office: $41.5 million

Peggy Sue Got Married is a 1986 American fantasy comedy-drama film directed by Francis Ford Coppola and starring Kathleen Turner as a woman on the verge of a divorce, who finds herself transported back to the days of her senior year in high school in 1960. The film was written by husband-and-wife team Jerry Leichtling and Arlene Sarner.

Peggy Sue Got Married was released by Tri-Star Pictures on October 10, 1986. The film was a box office success and received positive reviews from critics. It was nominated for three Academy Awards: Best Actress (Turner), Best Cinematography, and Best Costume Design. It was also nominated for two Golden Globe Awards: Best Actress – Musical or Comedy (Turner) and Best Picture – Musical or Comedy.

The title of the film and the name of the main character refer to the 1959 song by Buddy Holly, which is played over the film's opening credits.

== Plot ==
In 1985, Peggy Sue Bodell attends her 25-year high school reunion, accompanied by her daughter, Beth, rather than her husband, Charlie, who was her high-school sweetheart. She and Charlie married right after graduation when Peggy Sue became pregnant, but have recently separated due to Charlie's infidelity.

At the reunion, Peggy reconnects with her old high school girlfriends, Maddy and Carol. She ignores Charlie when he unexpectedly arrives. The emcee then announces the reunion's "king and queen": Richard Norvik, the former class geek who is now a billionaire inventor, and Peggy Sue. Overwhelmed, she faints onstage while being crowned.

Peggy Sue awakens, only it is now 1960, her senior year of high school. Confused and disoriented, she decides to go home to her parents and act like everything is normal. At school, she breaks up with Charlie. Hoping that Richard Norvik can shed light on her situation, she befriends him and relates what happened. He disbelieves her story until Peggy Sue begins giving details about the future. Later, she wants to sleep with Charlie after a party, but he panics and reminds her that she rebuffed him the weekend before. He takes her home, but instead of going inside, she goes to an all-night café where she spots classmate Michael Fitzsimmons, an artsy loner whom she always wished she had slept with. As they sit and talk about Hemingway and Kerouac, Peggy Sue learns they have much in common. They leave on his motorcycle and later have sex under the stars.

The next night at a music bar, Michael wants Peggy to go to Utah with him and another woman for a polygamous relationship in which the two women support him while he writes. She declines, encouraging him to use their night together as inspiration for his writing. Charlie happens to be singing at the bar, and she sees there is more to him than she realized. Charlie comes off the stage and speaks to a music agent who is there to evaluate him, but the agent is unimpressed.

The next day, Peggy Sue tries to talk to Charlie, but he lashes out, upset over failing to secure a record deal. She leaves to say goodbye to Richard, stating that she wants to stop ruining her life and everyone's around her, especially Charlie's, since the reason he stopped singing is because she got pregnant. Richard proposes, but she turns him down, not wanting to marry so young or derail his future. Peggy Sue visits her grandparents on her 18th birthday. Upon learning that her grandmother is psychic, she tells them her story. Her grandfather takes her to his Masonic lodge, where the members perform a ritual to return her to 1985. Charlie enters the lodge and, when lights go out, picks up and runs out with Peggy Sue, leaving everyone inside believing the ritual worked.

Charlie tells her that he has given up singing and has been given 10% of the family business. He then proposes and gives her the locket she was wearing at the class reunion. She looks inside and sees baby pictures of herself and Charlie, which resemble their children. Peggy Sue realizes they love each other. They have sex, proving that she would make the same choices again.

Peggy Sue awakens in a hospital back in 1985, with Charlie by her side. Charlie shows Peggy Sue the book Michael has written with the dedication, "To Peggy Sue and a starry night" (indicating that Peggy possibly did travel back in time). Charlie deeply regrets his infidelity and wants her back. Peggy Sue recalls her grandfather saying, "It's your grandma's strudel that's kept this family together", so she invites Charlie home for dinner and says, "I'll make a strudel."

== Cast ==
- Kathleen Turner as Peggy Sue Kelcher-Bodell
- Nicolas Cage as Charlie "Crazy Charlie" Bodell
- Barry Miller as Richard Norvik
- Catherine Hicks as Carol Heath
- Joan Allen as Maddy Nagle
- Kevin J. O'Connor as Michael Fitzsimmons
- Jim Carrey as Walter Getz
- Lisa Jane Persky as Delores Dodge
- Lucinda Jenney as Rosalie Testa
- Wil Shriner as Arthur Nagle
- Barbara Harris as Evelyn Kelcher, Peggy Sue's mother
- Don Murray as Jack Kelcher, Peggy Sue's father
- Sofia Coppola as Nancy Kelcher, Peggy Sue's younger sister
- Maureen O'Sullivan as Elizabeth Alvorg, Peggy Sue's grandmother
- Leon Ames as Barney Alvorg, Peggy Sue's grandfather
- Helen Hunt as Beth Bodell
- Marshall Crenshaw as reunion band member
- Glenn Withrow as Terry
- John Carradine as Leo

== Production ==
=== Development ===
The film was originally going to star Debra Winger and be directed by Jonathan Demme. They had creative differences and Demme left the project, to be replaced by Penny Marshall, who would be making her feature directorial debut. Then Marshall had creative differences with the writers and left the project. Winger then quit out of loyalty to Marshall. (Marshall then made her directing debut with Jumpin' Jack Flash after the original director dropped out.)

Rastar, the production company, offered the film to Francis Ford Coppola, hoping to entice Winger back to the project. In the end, Kathleen Turner became the star. Two of Coppola's relatives were also cast in the film: his daughter Sofia Coppola as Peggy Sue's sister, Nancy; and his nephew Nicolas Cage as Peggy's boyfriend and then estranged husband, Charlie. (Cage has later said he never wanted to play the role, but was asked multiple times by Coppola; he only agreed to take the part if he could play it in an over-the-top manner.)

=== Filming ===
Kathleen Turner stated that Francis Ford Coppola was contractually obligated to finish the film on time or lose final cut privilege. Accordingly, the cast and crew worked twenty hours a day, six days a week, to deliver the film to the studio on time.

Turner has spoken numerous times about the difficulty of working with co-star Nicolas Cage (Coppola's nephew). In her 2008 memoir, she wrote that:

"He caused so many problems. He was arrested twice for drunk-driving and, I think, once for stealing a dog. He'd come across a chihuahua he liked and stuck it in his jacket. On the last night of filming, he came into my trailer after he'd clearly been drinking heavily. He fell on his knees and asked if I could ever forgive him. I said, "Not right now. I have a scene to shoot. Excuse me," and just walked out. Nicolas didn't manage to kill the film, but he didn't add a lot to it, either. For years, whenever I saw him, he'd apologize for his behavior. I'd say: "Look, I'm way over it." But I haven't pursued the idea of working with him again."

Turner also criticized Cage for his decision to wear false teeth and to adopt a nasal fry for his character (Cage said he based it on Pokey from The Gumby Show). During an interview in 2018, Turner commented on Cage's nasal voice that:

"It was tough to not say, 'Cut it out". But it wasn't my job to say to another actor what he should or shouldn't do. So I went to Francis [Ford Coppola]. I asked him, 'You approved this choice?' It was very touchy. He [Nicolas Cage] was very difficult on set. But the director allowed what Nicolas wanted to do with his role, so I wasn't in a position to do much except play with what I'd been given. If anything, it [Cage's portrayal] only further illustrated my character's disillusionment with the past. The way I saw it was, yeah, he was that asshole."

In 2008, in response to Turner's claims that he had driven drunk and stolen a chihuahua, Cage sued her for defamation and won. In exchange, he received a public apology from Turner, admission from her publisher that the claims were false and defamatory, and a pledge that Turner and the publisher would make a substantial donation to charity.

== Release and reception ==
Peggy Sue Got Married received positive reviews from critics. On the review aggregator website Rotten Tomatoes, the film holds an approval rating of 88% based on 32 reviews, with an average rating of 6.9/10. The website's critics consensus reads, "Peggy Sue Got Married may seem just another in the line of 80's boomer nostalgia films, but none of the others have Kathleen Turner's keen lead performance." Metacritic, which uses a weighted average, assigned the film a score of 75 out of 100, based on 15 critics, indicating "generally favorable" reviews.

Rita Kempley of The Washington Post gave the film a positive review, but wrote of Cage's performance: "What mars the movie, aside from the pokey opening and overused theme, is an icky performance by Nicolas Cage as Charlie. He calls it surreal, 'a type of cartoon acting.' Well, he does kind of remind you of Jughead." Roger Ebert of the Chicago Sun-Times gave the film four-out-of-four-stars, calling it "one of the best movies of the year" and stated Turner's performance "must be seen to be believed."

The film grossed $41.4 million in the United States. It was the first box-office success for Coppola since The Outsiders (1983).

In addition to the film's three Academy Award nominations and Turner's nomination at the Sant Jordi Awards, Turner won the 1986 National Board of Review Award for Best Actress. The film appeared on Siskel and Ebert's best of 1986 lists.

Peggy Sue Got Married ranks No. 34 on Entertainment Weekly's list of "50 Best High School Movies".

== Musical adaptation ==
The film was adapted by Leichtling and Sarner into a full-length musical theater production which opened in London's West End theatre district in 2001. Despite receiving solid reviews and a several million pound advance, the September 11 attacks forced the show to close early.
