= Twixt (film) =

2011 film directed by Francis Ford Coppola

- Planned theatrical release poster
- Directed by: Francis Ford Coppola
- Written by: Francis Ford Coppola
- Produced by: Francis Ford Coppola
- Starring: Val Kilmer; Bruce Dern; Elle Fanning; Ben Chaplin
- Cinematography: Mihai Mălaimare Jr.
- Edited by: Robert Schafer
- Music by: Dan Deacon; Osvaldo Golijov
- Production company: American Zoetrope
- Distributed by: 20th Century Fox Home Entertainment
- Release date: September 4, 2011 (TIFF)
- Running time: 88 minutes
- Country: United States
- Language: English
- Budget: $7 million
- Box office: $1.3 million

Twixt is a 2011 American horror film written, directed, and produced by Francis Ford Coppola. It stars Val Kilmer, Bruce Dern, Elle Fanning, Ben Chaplin, Alden Ehrenreich, David Paymer, Joanne Whalley and Tom Waits. The film follows a struggling novelist (Kilmer) who stumbles upon a murder mystery in a small town, in the process entering an alternative, dream world. The film's title refers to the two worlds explored in the film, the dream and the waking worlds.

The film premiered on September 4, 2011 at the Toronto International Film Festival and was screened at various film festivals in North America, receiving a limited theatrical release in a handful of international markets. It received mixed reviews from critics, with Cahiers du cinéma calling it the third best film of 2012.

Twixt was released on Blu-ray and DVD by Fox Home Entertainment on July 23, 2013. A re-edited director's cut, B'Twixt Now and Sunrise, was released theatrically on September 30, 2022, and on Blu-ray and digital on February 28, 2023.

== Plot ==
Hall Baltimore is a down-on-his-luck writer who specializes in novels based upon witch hunting. At a small-town book signing, he is approached by Sheriff Bobby LaGrange, an eccentric fan with two requests: that Hall read his latest work and that he also accompany him to the morgue to view the body of a recent murder victim, as Bobby believes that it would make for a great story. Hall reluctantly agrees, and at the morgue he learns that the person was murdered by a serial killer. Despite offers from Bobby, Hall opts to not look at the victim's face. At the coffee shop, he learns about a local hotel that once sheltered Edgar Allan Poe. This, along with the murders and various other odd features of the town, prompt Hall to announce to his wife, Denise, that he wants to write a piece based upon the town.

After falling asleep, Hall is shown wandering a dream-like version of the town, where he meets V, a young girl by the name of Virginia, who is nicknamed "Vampira" due to her strange teeth and braces. V tells Hall that she's a fan of his work but was unable to attend the signing due to the town's clock tower always giving seven different conflicting times. Hall attempts to persuade V to join him at the hotel for a soda, but she refuses to enter the lodging. Despite this, Hall enters the hotel and discovers that it is run by a strange and eccentric couple that talks about daylight saving time and the town's history of murder. V appears in the window, only for the female hotel owner to shoo her away. V bites her, which prompts Hall to run outside after V and find her threatening a priest by saying that he "knew what [he] did". Hall continues to follow V and runs into Edgar Allan Poe, who guides him back to town.

The next morning Hall wakes and, inspired, decides that he would like to collaborate with Bobby on his proposed story, which would center around vampires. Bobby invites Hall to his home, which contains a miniature model of a machine that would drive a stake into a vampire's heart. Hall is informed that Bobby believes that the machine would be good in the story, which he wants to name The Vampire Executions. Despite Bobby's input, Hall finds himself faced with writer's block and accepts several sleeping pills from Bobby in hopes of finding further inspiration from his dreams. Hall succeeds in once again entering the dream version of the town, where he meets Poe again. A series of visions imply that V was molested by the town's priest, who took in orphans out of fear of them joining Flamingo, leader of the people across the lake, who are believed to be vampires. In the waking world, Hall's world begins to unravel as several strange occurrences begin to mirror the experiences he had in the dream world, such as Bobby talking about how he believes that teenagers gathering at the town's lake are "evil" and "asking for it". This prompts Hall to look strangely at Bobby, who knocks Hall unconscious.

In the dream world, Hall learns that the priest had drugged and murdered all the children in order to keep them from joining Flamingo at the lake. V managed to briefly survive, but was chased down and murdered by the priest. Ashamed of his actions, the priest hanged himself. Hall realizes that his writer's block is the result of a form of guilt over his daughter's death in a boating accident, as he had been too drunk to accompany her that morning. Working through his emotions, Hall writes a story where V survives the priest's assaults and is rescued by Flamingo. Hall wakes up in his room to find that Bobby has left. He goes to the Sheriff's office, only to find that the deputy has been murdered and that Bobby has hanged himself, leaving a note that says "Guilty." Upset, Hall goes down to the morgue to look at the murder victim's face, only to discover that it is V's body and that she had been impaled with a stake. Hall removes the stake from her chest, at which point V awakens and attacks him with a new set of elongated fangs.

The screen then cuts to Hall's publisher, Sam Malkin, setting down a new manuscript and telling Hall that he loves the story (implying everything from the first dream sequence up to this point has been the manuscript itself) and sees a whole new series ahead for Hall that will make him more popular than ever. Post-film text reveals that the series was moderately popular, Bobby's murder was never solved and that Flamingo was never seen or heard from again.

== Cast ==
- Val Kilmer as Hall Baltimore
- Bruce Dern as Bobby LaGrange
- Elle Fanning as Virginia "V"
- Ben Chaplin as Edgar Allan Poe
- Joanne Whalley as Denise
- Don Novello as Melvin
- David Paymer as Sam Malkin
- Alden Ehrenreich as Flamingo
- Lisa Biales as Ruth
- Anthony Fusco as Pastor Allan Floyd
- Ryan Simpkins as Carolyne
- Lucas Rice Jordan as P. J.
- Bruce A. Miroglio as Deputy Arbus
- Dylan Cavaz as Orphan
- Ryan Himenes as Hardware Store Clerk
- Tom Waits as The Narrator

== Production ==
=== Development ===
In an interview with The New York Times, Coppola discussed the origins of the film, which he said "grew out of dream [he] had last year – more of a nightmare" and "seemed to have the imagery of Hawthorne or Poe." He continued:

But as I was having it I realized perhaps it was a gift, as I could make it as a story, perhaps a scary film, I thought even as I was dreaming. But then some loud noise outside woke me up, and I wanted to go back to the dream and get an ending. But I couldn't fall back asleep so I recorded what I remembered right there and then on my phone. I realized that it was a gothic romance setting, so in fact I'd be able to do it all around my home base, rather than have to go to a distant country.

=== Filming and post-production ===
Twixt was filmed at Coppola's estate in Napa County as well as locations in Lake County, California, including the City of Clearlake, downtown Kelseyville and Nice. The film was shot using the digital Sony HDW-F900 camera, as well as Red digital cameras.

Musician Dan Deacon scored the film. The film's name was changed from Twixt Now and Sunrise to Twixt, and scenes from it were played at the 2011 San Diego Comic-Con.

The film marks the on-screen reunion of former spouses Val Kilmer and Joanne Whalley.

== Release ==
Twixt was screened solely at film festivals in North America as it was a featured film at the November 2011 American Film Market. At some of these film festival screenings, Coppola would re-edit the film live, putting certain scenes together based on the audience's reaction. The film received a general theatrical release in a handful of international markets.

A re-edited and restored version titled B'Twixt Now and Sunrise was released theatrically on September 30, 2022, and on Blu-ray and digital on February 28, 2023.

== Reception ==
Rotten Tomatoes collected 20 reviews and found 30% of them positive, with an average rating of 4.6/10. Metacritic, which uses a weighted average, assigned the film a score of 40 out of 100, based on 6 critics, indicating "mixed or average" reviews. Some reviewers have criticized the film for being "flimsy" and "[close to] unwatchable". The Hollywood Reporter panned Coppola's dream sequences in Twixt, commenting that the "young Coppola" could have done more with the scenes while "the present-day [Coppola] produces only tepid and tired imagery that would not earn high marks in any film school."

In contrast, Le Monde, Variety and Les Cahiers du cinéma gave the film positive reviews, and Variety praised Twixt as a "disarmingly cheeky, intermittently gorgeous trifle". French film magazine Cahiers du cinéma placed it as the third best film of 2012.
