= 72andSunny =

Advertising agency

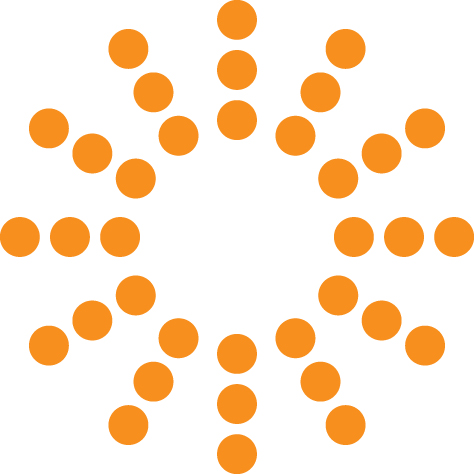
- Type: Advertising agency
- Industry: Advertising, Communications
- Founded: 2004; 22 years ago
- Founders: John Boiler, Glenn Cole, Robert Nakata
- Headquarters: Los Angeles, Amsterdam
- Website: 72andsunny.com

72andSunny is a global creative advertising agency, founded in 2004 by John Boiler, Glenn Cole, Robert Nakata and Greg Perlot, and currently chaired by Boiler, Cole and former CEO Matt Jarvis. 72andSunny has offices in Los Angeles, Amsterdam, New York City, Singapore, Toronto, and Sydney. The agency is known for brand transformations and culture-led marketing campaigns that "combine entertainment and advertising."

72andSunny was awarded "Agency of the Year" in 2012 by Ad Age and 2013 by Adweek. In 2026, Ad Age named 72andSunny its Sports and Entertainment Agency of the Year.

In 2025, 72andSunny launched the 72andSunny Creative Collective, which brought Forsman & Bodenfors, Bruce Mau Design, and Hecho Studios under one umbrella.

It is a subsidiary of Stagwell, formerly MDC Partners.

== History ==
=== Founding and early history ===
72andSunny was founded in 2004 in Los Angeles and Amsterdam by three former leaders of Wieden+Kennedy Amsterdam—John Boiler, Glenn Cole and Robert Nakata—and former director of Microsoft Advertising and Corporate Research, Greg Perlot. The company's initial clients included Bugaboo, Microsoft Xbox, Nike, and Quiksilver. Perlot departed to work for Quicksilver in 2008 and entrepreneur Matt Jarvis replaced him as Chief Strategy Officer to drive growth and scale the business.

In 2009, 72andSunny won Ad Age's Small Agency Campaign of the Year based on its work for Nike. In the same year, the agency also launched its own product line, Nook Sleep Systems, the first organic infant mattresses line in the United States. The line offers non-toxic bedding and sleepwear.

=== History with MDC ===
In 2010, MDC Partners acquired the agency. Following the acquisition, 72andSunny added clients including Google, Target, Starbucks, Diageo, and General Mills to its roster.

In 2011, 72andSunny created Benetton's controversial "UnHate" campaign featuring world leaders kissing.

In 2011, 72andSunny started working with Activision Call of Duty, inventing an annual "live action trailer," featuring celebrities including Jonah Hill, Taylor Kitsch, Michael B Jordan, and Cara Delevingne.

That same year, 72andSunny also launched 72U, an in-house communications school. Kelly Schoeffel and Geoff McGann were the first leaders.

Samsung's 2012 campaign, "Apple Fanboys," was credited with helping Samsung surpass Apple in phone sales.

In 2013, John Boiler became the company's first CEO and Glenn Cole became its sole Chief Creative Officer.

The company was named "Agency of the Year" in 2013 and again in 2014 by Advertising Age and Adweek.

In 2015, 72andSunny produced a series of campaigns based around Adidas, described as "relentless and aggressive storytelling," under the brand line "Here To Create."

In 2015, 72andSunny launched Brand Citizens, a purpose and impact consultancy "to help brands make doing good a central part of their marketing," led by former CEO of the Surfrider Foundation, Jim Moriarty.

In 2016, 72andSunny's Amsterdam offices debuted their own product, RAYNSIE, a line of weatherproof coveralls for urban riders. The agency called RAYNSIE's design an "homage to the city" based on the bright colors and prints.

72andSunny released a "Diversity Playbook" in 2017 that it invited competitors to "steal."

In 2017, 72andSunny founders Glenn Code and John Boiler became "Creative Chairmen;" Matt Jarvis was promoted to CEO.

In 2018, Hecho En 72, the production entity housed within 72andSunny, launched as its own company, Hecho Studios.

In 2019, MDC established 72andSunny as an anchor of its "Constellation" strategy, together with Instrument, CP&B, Redscout, and Hecho Studio.

=== Current operations ===
72andSunny Los Angeles has occupied the former offices of Howard Hughes at the old Hughes Aircraft Company headquarters in Playa Vista since 2013.

Ad Age estimated that 72andSunny earned global revenues of $164 million in 2019, placing it second among MDC agencies by revenue. 72andSunny saw 16% organic growth in 2020, through acquiring clients such as United Airlines, Etsy, and Indeed.

The company is credited with helping Samsung overtake Apple Inc. in cell phone sales.

72andSunny is currently a subsidiary of Stagwell, a marketing group housing a portfolio of creative and diversified marketing agencies, which acquired MDC Partners In 2021.

=== Notable awards ===
The agency has won 5 Emmy Awards since 2020, including being the most awarded program at the 31st Annual Sport Emmys with "NFL Next 100.". In 2021, 72andSunny was named Entertainment Agency of the Cannes Lions Festival.

Year	Award	Notes
2012	AdAge Agency of the Year	
2012	Cannes Lions Grand Prix	for Benetton "UnHATE"
2013	Adweek Agency of the Year	
2019	Emmy Award	for "The Truth About Opioids - The Treatment Box"
2020	Emmy Awards (4)	for NFL "Next 100"
2022	AdAge A-List Standout Agency of the Year	

== Notable campaigns ==
Notable campaigns include:

- Samsung "The Next Big Thing is Here" This campaign was launched with the intent of displacing Apple as the leading US smartphone seller, and is attributed with pushing Samsung above Apple in phone sales. Notable work included "Apple Fanboys", "El Plato Supreme" and the Samsung/Jay-Z release of "Magna Carta Holy Grail."
- K-Swiss "Kenny Powers MFCEO" campaign on Funny or Die won at the 2011 Clio Awards.
- NFL "100th Anniversary" and "The 100-Year Game" The campaign launched with "The 100-Year Game", which won the USA Today Ad Meter for Best Super Ad in 2019, and closed with "The Next 100" for which 72andSunny won 4 Emmys.
- Benetton "Unhate"
- Google "Year In Search"
- Nike Take it to the Next Level
- Call of Duty - The Vet and the N00b
- NFL - Football is for Everyone
- Tinder - Swipe Night
- United Airlines - Good Leads the Way

== See also ==
- 140 Proof
- Sullivan & Company
