= Goob =

Goob may refer to:

- Kudditji Kngwarreye or "Goob" (1938–2017), Australian Aboriginal artist
- The Goob, a 2014 British film
- The Goob, an Assorted Nuts Animation Studios animated series
- Michael "Goob" Yagoobian, a character in the 2007 Disney film Meet the Robinsons
