= Namer (disambiguation) =

Namer (Hebrew for leopard) is an Israeli infantry fighting vehicle.

Namer may also refer to:

- Larry Namer, American television executive
- IAI Nammer, a canceled Israeli fighter aircraft project
