= Magnus Jansson =

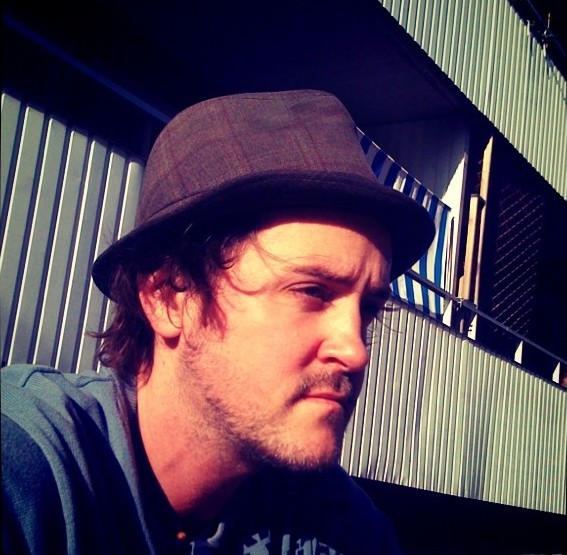
- Magnus Jansson

Background information
- Born: Magnus Jansson; Sweden
- Genres: Animation; Writing; Computing
- Occupations: Writer; Animator; Director; CEO
- Years active: 1993-present
- Website: www.nutteryentertainment.com www.facebook.com/Magnus Jansson; Instagram @NutteryEntertainment; Twitter – @NutteryEnt

Magnus Jansson is a Swedish award-winning writer, director, artist, animator, and musician who is the co-founder and CEO of The Nuttery Entertainment, a digital-first and fan-centric studio based in Karlstad, Sweden and with offices in Stockholm and Los Angeles. Prior to starting up The Nuttery Entertainment, Magnus was the co-founder and CEO of Assorted Nuts Animation Studios, a CGI studio and producer based in Karlstad, Sweden and also its subsidiary division in the US, Assorted Nuts Entertainment. He attended Karlstad University from where he qualified with a bachelor's degree in Media and Communication Science and a bachelor's degree in Information Systems.

== Band ==
In his twenties, Jansson started the Swedish punk-rock band, Stoned, formed in 1993, and for whom he wrote most of the band's lyrics and also directed their music videos. Stoned produced 2 EPs and four studio albums – Music for the Morons (1995), Ed’s Diner (1997), Way Back in the Day (1999) and Stoned (2000) – and toured internationally several times before disbanding in 2003.

== Computing ==
Jansson started his working career as a Head of Software Development. Self-taught in the art of programming, he spent three years creating custom applications and system add-ons for several international companies.

== Animation Entertainment ==
In 1998, realizing the potential in the growing CGI industry, Jansson left Software Development behind and began working in advertising as a freelance digital artist, supplying ad-agencies with custom 3D solutions.

In 2002, Jansson founded Assorted Nuts Animation Studios in Karlstad, and later opened an Assorted Nuts office in Los Angeles. In 2012, Jansson formed Assorted Nuts Entertainment, a new division of Assorted Nuts studios but based in Santa Monica.

In April 2016, he left Assorted Nuts and started up The Nuttery Entertainment, a digital-first studio focusing on animation and music-based entertainment.

== Awards ==
At the 2nd Annual Streamy Awards on Sunday, 11 April 2010, at the Orpheum Theatre in Los Angeles, California, Jansson was awarded the Streamy Award for 'Best Animation in a Web-Series' by the International Academy of web television for the online series The Goob after the animated series first became a successful mobile download in 2008 achieving over five million mobile downloads in its first year. Jansson's creation, The Goob, which premiered in the US on Strike.TV, also holds the distinction of being the world's first animated video-blogger and was signed as a recording artist for EMI where the character released 2 singles.
