= Marilyn Vance =

American costume designer and filmmaker

- Occupations: Costume designer, film producer, executive producer, associate producer, set designer, film director, actress
- Years active: 1980–present
- Children: Ladd Vance; Gregg Vance

Marilyn Vance (née Kaye) is an American costume designer and filmmaker. She received nominations for an Academy Award and two BAFTA Awards. She was honored with the Costume Designers Guild Career Achievement Award in 2009.

== Background ==
Born Marilyn Kaye, she was once married to Kenny Vance of Jay and the Americans. Marilyn became a costume designer in Hollywood. She is the mother of film producer Ladd Vance and actor/producer-writer Gregg Vance of Phat Beach fame, and over the course of her career as costume designer and film producer, she has been credited as Marilyn Straker, Marilyn Vance-Straker, Marilyn Kay Vance, and Marilyn Vance. When Vance was asked about how a costumer could also be a film producer, she stated that for her it was a "natural progression" of her career.

== Career ==
=== Costume design ===
Vance began her costume design career in the 1980s on The Misadventures of Sheriff Lobo. While still working in television, she began costume design for many notable films, such as Fast Times at Ridgemont High, The Breakfast Club, Ferris Bueller's Day Off, The Untouchables, and Pretty Woman, receiving specific recognition for her contributions to The Untouchables, Pretty Woman, The Rocketeer, and Mystery Men. She designed the red off-the-shoulder evening gown that Julia Roberts wore in Pretty Woman, which has been referred to as "iconic" by Vogue Paris.

She was noted in the late 1980s for her use of designer clothing for product placement.

In 1988, she was nominated for both an Oscar and a BAFTA Film Award for her work on The Untouchables. In 1990, she received a BAFTA nomination for her costumer work on Pretty Woman. In 1992, she won a Saturn Award for her work on The Rocketeer, and a Saturn nomination in 2000 for her work on Mystery Men. At the 11th Costume Designers Guild Awards in 2009, she received a Lacoste Career Achievement in Film Award for her feature work.

=== Producer ===
While still continuing her work as a costume designer, Vance began her work as film producer, with her first production being The First Power in 1990. This was followed by Judgment Night, The Getaway, and Timecop. She partnered as co-chairman with E! Entertainment founder Alan Mruvka in 1993 with The Ministry of Film (MOF) as a motion picture and television production company. Her first productions with MOF were the Erotic Confessions video series (1994–1997) and Embrace of the Vampire in 1995. She returned to television in 1996 with The Legend of Gator Face for Hallmark Entertainment and the Pacific Blue series for USA Network. These were followed in 1998 by the MOF productions Intimate Sessions video series and the film Digging to China.

In 1996, Vance and Mruvka established the Ministry of Sound, a music and production and publishing company.

MOF was dissolved by Mruvka in 1998. In 1999, Vance sued Mruvka, alleging he diverted assets from their production company, the Ministry of Film Inc. In 2003, Vance won a $1 million jury verdict against her former partner. Vance continued in film and television with her ongoing work as either costume designer, producer, or both for Pacific Blue (1996–2000), Red Letters (2000), Run for the Money (2002), The Girl Next Door (2004), Two Sisters (2008), My Best Friend's Girl (2008), and Unknown Sender (2008).

Vance is also a co-founder of Vance Entertainment, a Hollywood-based entertainment development and production company along with her son and actor Gregg Vance . Marilyn and Gregg optioned every ghost story (many hundreds) written by the legendary, and renowned Paranormal Investigator and Author Dr. Hans Holzer, considered internationally as the 'Founding Father of Modern Day Paranormal Research'.

== Awards and recognition ==
- 2009, received a Lacoste Career Achievement in Film Award for her work in feature films from Costume Designers Guild
- 2000, nominated for a Saturn Award for 'Best Costumes' by the Academy of Science Fiction, Fantasy & Horror Films for Mystery Men
- 1992, won a Saturn Award for 'Best Costumes' by the Academy of Science Fiction, Fantasy & Horror Films for The Rocketeer
- 1990, nominated for a BAFTA Film Award by British Academy of Film and Television Arts for 'Best Costume Design' for Pretty Woman
- 1988, nominated for an Academy Award by Academy of Motion Picture Arts and Sciences for 'Best Costume Design' for The Untouchables
- 1988, nominated for a BAFTA Film Award by British Academy of Film and Television Arts for 'Best Costume Design' for The Untouchables

== Partial filmography ==
=== Costume designer ===
- My Best Friend's Girl (2008)
- The Girl Next Door (2004)
- Mystery Men (1999)
- G.I. Jane (1997)
- Pacific Blue (81 episodes, 1996–2000) (TV)
- Street Fighter (1994)
- Sommersby (1993)
- Medicine Man (1992)
- The Last Boy Scout (1991)
- The Rocketeer (1991)
- Predator 2 (1990)
- Die Hard 2 (1990)
- Pretty Woman (1990)
- Road House (1989)
- Little Monsters (1989)
- Die Hard (1988)
- Throw Momma from the Train (1987)
- Predator (1987)
- The Untouchables (1987)
- Ferris Bueller's Day Off (1986)
- Pretty in Pink (1986)
- The Breakfast Club (1985)
- Streets of Fire (1984)
- Romancing the Stone (1984)
- 48 Hrs. (1982)
- Fast Times at Ridgemont High (1982)
- The Misadventures of Sheriff Lobo (1980) (TV)

=== Producer ===
- Unknown Sender (6 episodes, 2008) (TV)
- Red Letters (2000)
- Pacific Blue (101 episodes, 1996–2000) (TV)
- Intimate Sessions (9 episodes, 1998) (TV)
- Digging to China (1997) (producer)
- The Legend of Gator Face (1996)
- Embrace of the Vampire (1995)
- Timecop (1994)
- The Getaway (1994)
- Judgment Night (1993)
- The First Power (1990)
