= Forza Football =

Football media company in Sweden

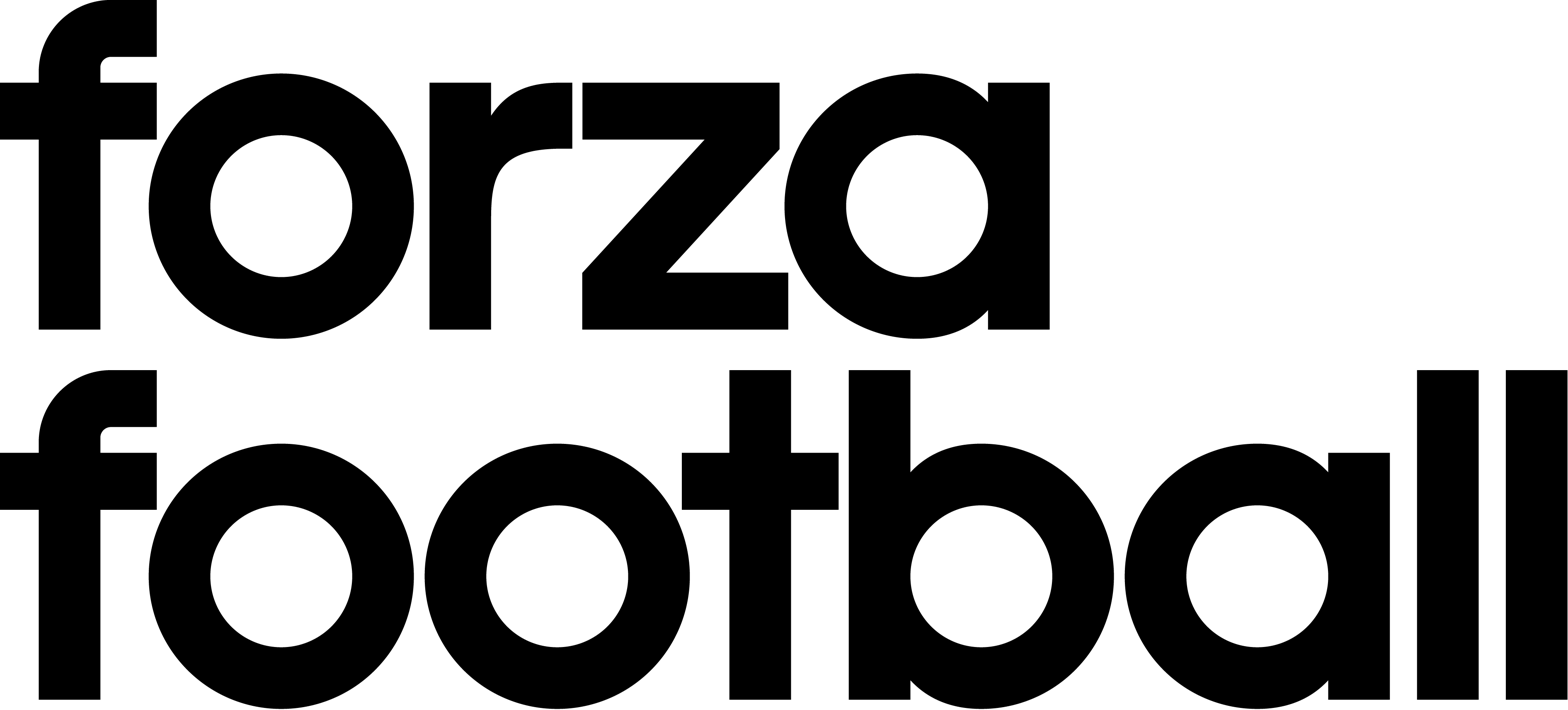
- Formerly: Football Addicts, Live Score Addicts
- Industry: Football; Media Internet; Mobile broadcasting
- Founded: 2012
- Founder: Patrik Arnesson; Erik Heinemark; Anders Elfving
- Headquarters: Kungsgatan 20, Gothenburg, Sweden
- Key people: Jonas Linné (CEO)
- Revenue: €5.2m (2021)
- Website: forzafootball.com/company/

Forza Football is a Sweden-based football media company. The app Forza Football features live-scores, statistics and video highlights for both men's and women's football all over the world. The company also focusses on "making the world of football a better place", which includes running a football academy for children in Cambodia and collaborating with organisations like Transparency International, Stonewall or Kick It Out.

== History ==
The company was founded in 2012 in Gothenburg, Sweden, by Patrik Arnesson, Erik Heinemark and Anders Elfving under the name Football Addicts. Within the first month after the release, their app Live Score Addicts was downloaded by over 300,000 users.

In April 2014, the company announced the decision to change the name of the live-score app to Forza Football, which came with a variety of new features as well as a whole new design and user interface.

The company took the pledge in the #WhatIf campaign organised by Women In Football in May 2018, with the goal to offer the same coverage of women’s football as for the men’s game.

Later that year, together with Kazakoff Design, Forza Football was awarded the top distinction for communication design, the Red Dot: Grand Prix, in the Red Dot Design Award 2018.

In 2021, they had a revenue of around SEK 56 million and a profit of SEK 9.8 million. Since April 2022, Jonas Linné is the CEO of the football app, while founder Patrik Arnesson will focus more on the NFT business through the company Forza Ikonia.

Forza Football collaborated with investigative journalism platform Blankspot and creative agency Forsman & Bodenfors to release Cards of Qatar in June 2022. Instead of the World Cups' star players, the Cards of Qatar profile workers that have been injured or killed on the job during preparations for the 2022 FIFA World Cup. Later that year, the reportage series won the Stora Journalistpriset 2022 in the category "Innovator of the Year".

In October 2022, Forza Football was listed as one of Sweden's 90 hottest fast-growing tech companies by new business news site Breakit.

== Surveys ==
=== Homophobia in football ===
In October 2014, 30,000 football fans participated in a survey regarding attitudes towards homosexuality in football. Louise Taylor of The Guardian analysed the findings of the poll: "Although the results are varied and reflect the cultural contexts of the regions in which respondents live the overall message is that homophobia among football supporters seems to be a diminishing, albeit slowly, problem." A similar survey of 50,000 fans took place in December 2017. The results showed that 76% of the participants would feel comfortable if a player in their national team came out as gay or bisexual. In an online article for Forbes, Steve Price titled that the poll makes a "grim reading for U.S. Soccer" on LGBT tolerance.

=== Racism in football ===
In 2018, Forza Football worked together with Kick It Out on a survey to identify global attitudes and issues in regards to racial equality in football. Almost 27,000 people from 38 countries took part in the poll. The results showed that 54% of the fans have been witness to racial abuse during a match, with just 28% of the participants being aware of how and where to report any racist incident. Also three out of four fans believed that FIFA needs to take previous incidents into account when awarding tournaments to a country. On top of that, the findings indicated that 60% of the participating fans supported the idea of point deductions for teams whose fans have been involved in racist incidents.

=== Fan confidence in FIFA ===
Prior to the FIFA presidential election in 2016, Forza Football ran a survey in its app, asking more than 35,000 football fans in 30 countries to pick the next president of FIFA. The results showed that four out of five fans did not think Sepp Blatter was the right candidate for the job, and 69.2% said they had no confidence in FIFA. The questions in the poll were prepared and published by global anti-corruption movement Transparency International. The report was later picked up by media outlets around the globe, including The Guardian and CNN. In early 2017, 53% of 25,000 participants stated in another poll that they did not have confidence in FIFA.

== Academy ==
In 2016, the company founded its own football academy in Siem Reap, Cambodia, after an employee noticed that there was a need for children to play for organised clubs and that only a low number of them had access to the few existing pitches. Two years later, around 150 young players trained in the academy, and up to 800 kids were reached in the community programmes every week. Besides that, players have the chance to become a coach for further personal development.

== World Record ==
During the summer of 2018, the company broke the world record for the largest number of players in a single, non-stop football game, with its academy in Cambodia. The record at the time was set in Chile with 2,357 players. After 85 hours, 2,734 players of all ages, races, backgrounds and genders had participated – scoring a combined 1,095 goals.
