= Alan Mruvka =

American film producer

- Born: 1957 (age 68–69); The Bronx, New York
- Education: University of Miami; Pratt Institute
- Occupations: Filmmaker, film producer, television producer, screenwriter, actor, entrepreneur, real-estate developer, self-storage owner & operator
- Years active: 1984–present
- Parent(s): Murray Mruvka (father); Ruth Mruvka (mother)
- Website: thealancompany.com

Alan Mruvka (born 1958 in Bronx, New York) is an American entertainment and media entrepreneur, film producer and screenwriter. He created and co-founded Movietime Channel, which later became E! Entertainment television. He is the Founder, President and CEO of 'The Alan Mruvka Company', and is a New Jersey real estate developer.

== Background ==
Mruvka was born to Polish refugees in Bronx, New York in 1957. He grew up in Flushing, Queens and Englewood Cliffs, New Jersey, where he attended Dwight Morrow High School. He studied architecture and structural engineering at the University of Miami and New York's Pratt Institute.

== Career ==
Mruvka founded E! Entertainment Television, formerly known as Movietime, and was chairman and co-founder of The Ministry of Film and Filmtown Entertainment, and is now President/ CEO of TwelveOne Entertainment, a movie and television production company.

=== Entertainment, film, and television ===
Mruvka created and founded Movietime Channel Inc now known as "E! Entertainment Television" with partner Larry Namer in 1984. While with E!, Mruvka oversaw production of over 20,000 hours of programming while guiding the channel to the fastest growth of a start-up of a cable network in television history. He also founded Movies USA magazine, as a national movie magazine distributed in movie theaters. Also in the 90's, Mruvka co-founded Ministry of Film (MOF) with Marilyn Vance, however that union ended in a lawsuit dispute. In 1992, shortly after leaving E!, he created FX TV (Fitness and Exercise Television Inc.) as a cable channel to be launched in 1994, but sold FX to 20th Century Fox before it was launched. Fox Television planned a launch of their own FX Channel, and Mruvka sued them with the assertion that Fox had prior knowledge of his use of the initials. Mruvka then sold FX to Fox for an undisclosed amount thus allowing Fox to use the name.

While under the Ministry of Film shingle, Mruvka produced Erotic Confessions for Cinemax (1994–1997), Embrace of the Vampire (1995) starring Alyssa Milano, and co-wrote and produced Showtime's The Legend of Gator Face (1996). In 1998 he produced Intimate Sessions for Cinemax (1998), and the winner of the Chicago International Children's Film Festival and Sundance Film Festival critically acclaimed Digging to China starring Evan Rachel Wood, USA Network's Pacific Blue (1996–2000), the David Mamet directed State and Main, HBO's Red Letters, and the weekly boxing series Thunderbox (2000).

==== Internet ====
In 2000, Mruvka founded the internet entertainment portal celebstreet.com. As his first internet venture, the April 5 launch was christened by actress Pamela Lee Anderson at the Spring Internet world trade show at the Los Angeles Convention Center.

=== Filmology Labs ===
In 2026, Mruvka announced plans for Filmology Labs to open at the Padded Wagon Building in the historic silk mill complex, Reinhardt Mills, at 61 State Street in Paterson, New Jersey.

== Partial filmography ==
=== Film and television producer ===
- State and Main (2000)
- Red Letters (2000)
- Thunderbox (2000) TV series
- Digging to China (1997) (producer)
- Pacific Blue (1996) TV series
- The Legend of Gator Face (1996)
- Embrace of the Vampire (1995)
- Erotic Confessions" (1994) TV series
- E! Entertainment Television (1987) (Founder)

=== Writer ===
- The Legend of Gator Face (1996) (writer)

=== Actor ===
- Red Letters (2000)
- Digging to China (1997)
