= MDC Partners =

New York City-based advertising and marketing holding company

MDC Partners Inc.
- Formerly: Multi Discipline Communications
- Type: Private
- Traded as: Nasdaq: MDCA
- Industry: Advertising, public relations, marketing
- Founded: December 19, 1986; 39 years ago
- Founder: Miles Nadal
- Headquarters: New York City, United States
- Area served: Worldwide
- Key people: Mark Penn (chairman and CEO); Frank Lanuto (CFO)
- Revenue: US$1.326 billion (2015)
- Number of employees: 5,690 (2016)
- Website: www.mdc-partners.com

MDC Partners Inc. is an advertising and marketing holding company based in New York City. MDC is structured as a partnership model, in which it initially acquires a majority stake in its partner agency, leaving a percentage of ownership with the founder. It has more than 50 partner firms worldwide. In August 2021, following the merger of The Stagwell Group with MDC Partners, Stagwell formed Stagwell Media Network, a group of multichannel agencies.

== History ==
MDC Partners was founded as Multi Discipline Communications in 1980 in Toronto by Miles Nadal. The company held an IPO on October 16, 1987.

The company operated two divisions in the 1990s: Marketing and Communications and Secure Transaction Products, which included the production of checks, credit and debit cards, tickets, and stamps. Toward the end of the 1990s, MDC concentrated on growing its marketing and communications business. It continued to expand into the United States, surpassing CAD$1 billion in revenue in 2000 through acquisitions and organic growth.

In 2001, MDC formed its first partnership with the agency Crispin Porter + Bogusky.

In January 2004, the company changed its name to MDC Partners Inc.

In 2008, MDC became the first advertising company to build a capability designed for automated, or programmatic media trading, with the formation of Varick Media Management.

The company acquired Anomaly in 2010 and 72andSunny in 2011.

On July 21, 2015, Miles Nadal announced his resignation as CEO in response to an investigation by the U.S. Securities and Exchange Commission regarding executive pay and accounting practices. Nadal agreed to pay back $1.9 million in expenses and $10.6 million in salary and bonuses. He did not receive any severance or compensation for resigning. Chief accounting officer Michael Sabatino also announced his resignation and would reportedly repay $208,000 in bonuses. MDC's presiding director of the board, Scott Kauffman, succeeded Miles Nadal as chairman and CEO.

In December 2015, the company ranked 8th in Advertising Age’s global ranking of Agency Networks, by cumulative award wins. In June 2016, MDC announced the first acquisition under Kauffman of Swedish creative agency Forsman & Bodenfors, forming a strategic partnership with sister agency CP+B.

In April 2018, MDC acquired a 51% majority stake in digital creative agency Instrument for an undisclosed amount.

In March 2019, Mark Penn was named CEO of MDC Partners, and The Stagwell Group invested $100 million in the company.

== Operations ==
=== Company overview ===
MDC Partners is a global advertising holding company that invests in agency partners in the areas of advertising, marketing, media management, technology, analytics and consumer insights, direct marketing, and strategic consulting. The company is headquartered in New York City and also operates a corporate office in Toronto, where it was founded. It earned approximately US$1.33 billion in revenue 2015.

MDC typically invests in creative and digital firms. Historically, it invested in agencies during times when similar companies have scaled back on acquisitions. While the company has mainly invested in North American small to mid-sized agencies, it extended onto new global markets in the 2010s. As of 2015, 9% of the company's revenue came from outside North America.

MDC does not generally acquire agencies outright, but instead partners with agency management by acquiring a 51 to 80 percent initial stake. Instead of integrating the firms, acquired agencies continue to manage their own day-to-day operations. MDC provides support to the agencies in which it has invested including business strategy and financial resources. It operates a Strategic Resources Group, which supports the development of partner agencies. In 2004, Adweek called the company an "anti-holding company".

=== Partner Companies ===
Major holdings include over 50 advertising and marketing firms:

- 6 Degrees
- 72andSunny
- Albion
- Albion Drive
- Allison+Partners
- Anomaly
- Antidote 360
- Assembly
- Attention
- BOOM Marketing
- BORN A.I.
- Bruce Mau Design
- CIVILIAN
- Colle McVoy
- Concentric Health Experience
- Crispin Porter + Bogusky
- Doner
- Exponent Public Relations
- Forsman & Bodenfors
- Gale Partners
- Hello Design
- HL Group
- Hudsun Media
- Hunter Public Relations
- Instrument
- Kenna
- KWT Global (formerly Kwittken)
- Laird+Partners
- Legend
- MDC Media Partners
- mono
- Northstar
- Path Worldwide
- Real Interactive
- Redscout
- Relevent
- Sloane & Company
- Source
- Storyline Strategies
- TEAM Enterprises
- The Media Kitchen
- TradeX Partners
- UNION
- Unique Influence
- Varick
- Veritas Communications
- VITRO
- Wolfgang
- Yamamoto
- Y Media Labs
