= Arnold's Wrecking Co. =

Arnold's Wrecking Company
- Film poster
- Directed by: Steven E. de Souza
- Written by: Steven E. de Souza
- Produced by: Otto G. Stoll III
- Cinematography: Sam Vergolini
- Music by: Adom
- Release date: 1973
- Running time: 78 minutes
- Country: United States
- Language: English

Arnold's Wrecking Company is a 1973 American stoner film. It was the first film written and directed by Steven E. de Souza, released in 1973. It was filmed on Library Place, Princeton, New Jersey, with residents of the home of Ellwood and Shirley Kauffman receiving credits for their work. Business-manager-to be Scott Kauffman made a cameo appearance as the younger version of de Souza's character, Kenny.

== Synopsis ==
From the film's promotional materials:

Arnold Berman is a klutz. Just ask his cousin Kenny, who has to put up with him over summer vacation from college. Arnold has to be seen to be believed: an uptight, unreal, super-straight Business major who's a whiz at accounting and a failure at everything else. Kenny and his pal Rollo turn Arnold on to a little grass to loosen him up, but they don't realize the demons they've set free: for the now-swinging Arnold becomes a pothead Horatio Alger and soon has them all in the midst of a multi-million-dollar grass-dealing firm complete with snazzy executive offices, a fleet of delivery trucks, group insurance, and a little league team. All of this does not escape the attention of either the local police or the local "organization," and the result is a free-enterprise free-for-all in which the customers are as high as the company stock.

== Reception ==
The film won the Special Jury Prize at the 1972 Atlanta Film Festival. It was released in a few venues the following September, with promotion and advertising all but absent when the film's distributor went into bankruptcy at the same time.

The soundtrack by the band Adom, released on East Coast Records, has become something of a cult collectible, and the "Marijuana!" cut (with the lyrics simply being repetitions of that one word) was frequently played on the Dr. Demento radio show.

== See also ==
- List of American films of 1973
