= Pretty Woman =

1990 film by Garry Marshall

- Theatrical release poster
- Directed by: Garry Marshall
- Written by: J. F. Lawton
- Produced by: Arnon Milchan; Steven Reuther; Gary W. Goldstein
- Starring: Richard Gere; Julia Roberts
- Cinematography: Charles Minsky
- Edited by: Raja Gosnell; Priscilla Nedd
- Music by: James Newton Howard
- Production companies: Touchstone Pictures; Silver Screen Partners IV; Regency International Pictures(uncredited)
- Distributed by: Buena Vista Pictures Distribution
- Release date: March 23, 1990
- Running time: 119 minutes
- Country: United States
- Language: English
- Budget: $14 million
- Box office: $463.4 million

Pretty Woman is a 1990 American romantic comedy film directed by Garry Marshall and written by J. F. Lawton. The film stars Richard Gere and Julia Roberts and features Héctor Elizondo, Ralph Bellamy (in his final performance), Laura San Giacomo, and Jason Alexander in supporting roles.

The film's story centers on Hollywood escort Vivian Ward and wealthy corporate raider Edward Lewis. Vivian is hired to be Edward's escort for several business and social functions, and their relationship develops during her week-long stay with him. The film's title Pretty Woman is based on the 1964 song "Oh, Pretty Woman" by Roy Orbison.

The original screenplay was titled 3000 and was written by then-struggling screenwriter J. F. Lawton. Originally intended to be a dark cautionary tale about class and prostitution in Los Angeles, the film was reconceived as a romantic comedy with a large budget. Pretty Woman received mixed reviews from critics upon release, but widespread praise was directed towards Roberts' performance and her chemistry with Gere. It had the highest number of ticket sales in the US ever for a romantic comedy, with Box Office Mojo listing it as the number-one romantic comedy by the highest estimated domestic tickets sold at 42,176,400, slightly ahead of My Big Fat Greek Wedding (2002) at 41,419,500 tickets. The film grossed US$463.4 million worldwide and at the time of its release, was the fifth-highest-grossing film of all time worldwide, behind only E.T. the Extra-Terrestrial ($701 million at the time), Star Wars ($530 million at the time), Indiana Jones and the Last Crusade ($474 million at the time), and Jaws ($470 million at the time). It was also the highest-grossing R-rated film of all time (surpassing Rain Man) until it was surpassed by Terminator 2: Judgment Day in 1991, but remained the highest-grossing R-rated film released by Walt Disney Studios (surpassing Cocktail), holding the record for 34 years until Marvel Studios' Deadpool & Wolverine surpassed it in 2024.

Pretty Woman catapulted Roberts to superstardom, earning her the Golden Globe Award for Best Actress – Motion Picture Comedy or Musical, in addition to her first nominations for the Academy Award for Best Actress and the BAFTA Award for Best Actress in a Leading Role. The film also received nominations for the BAFTA Award for Best Film and the Golden Globe Award for Best Motion Picture – Musical or Comedy.

== Plot ==
One night while leaving a business party in the Hollywood Hills, corporate raider Edward Lewis takes his lawyer Philip's Lotus Esprit and finds himself in the red-light district on Hollywood Boulevard, where he meets street walker Vivian Ward. Lost and struggling to operate the stickshift car, Edward accepts Vivian's offer to drive him to the Regent Beverly Wilshire Hotel. Impulsively, he hires her for the whole night, and despite initial awkwardness, they have sex in his penthouse suite. The following day, Edward asks Vivian to stay for the week, as he must attend a series of business events while attempting to acquire Jim Morse's shipbuilding company. After negotiating, Edward and Vivian agree on $3,000. He also gives her money to buy appropriate clothes.

When Vivian tries to shop on Rodeo Drive, snobbish and rude saleswomen turn her away because of the way she looks. She asks hotel manager Barney for assistance. He gets store saleslady Bridget to find her a cocktail dress for that evening's business dinner. Later, she gets Barney to teach her table etiquette. Edward is astounded by Vivian's transformation. At dinner, he introduces Vivian to Morse and his grandson David, who is to take over the company. The dinner does not go well, as they are unhappy with Edward's plan to dismantle their company. Later, Edward tells Vivian about his personal and business life, including his estranged relationship with his late father.

Edward takes Vivian along as his date to a polo match. When Philip sees Vivian talking to David Morse, he tells Edward his suspicions that she is a corporate spy. Edward dismisses Philip's concerns by explaining their arrangement. With the knowledge of Vivian's true background, the married Philip talks to her alone and crudely propositions her for her services. Back in Edward's suite, Vivian is angry with Edward for exposing her in that way. He apologizes, admitting that he was jealous of Vivian talking to David. Edward takes Vivian by private jet to see La traviata at the San Francisco Opera, a story about a prostitute who falls in love with a wealthy man. She is moved, and she breaks her "no kissing" rule before having sex with him. Believing Edward has fallen asleep, Vivian says she loves him.

As the week is almost finished, Edward offers to get Vivian a condominium and an allowance, promising to visit her regularly. However, Vivian feels he is treating her like a prostitute. She shares her childhood fantasy of being rescued by a knight on a white steed. Edward meets with Morse, but chooses to work with him to save his company instead of dismantling it. Philip, furious that Edward's new direction has cost him a fortune, goes to the Beverly Wilshire to confront him. He finds Vivian. Blaming her for Edward's changes and angry at his business decision, Philip hits her and attempts to rape her. Edward arrives, pulls Philip off Vivian, punches him, and fires him. After completing his business in Los Angeles, Edward asks Vivian to stay with him for one more night, but only if she wants to, not because he is paying her. She gently refuses and leaves after telling him she thinks he has "lots of special gifts".

Vivian returns to her apartment hotel to pack for her move to San Francisco to get a new job and a high-school diploma. She gives her roommate, fellow prostitute Kit De Luca, some money and tells her she has "a lot of potential". Kit leaves sex work and enrolls in beauty classes. Vivian then waits in the apartment for the bus. Edward has the chauffeur take him to her apartment. He climbs out of the white limousine's sunroof and ascends the fire escape to "rescue" Vivian, just like the knight in her childhood fantasy. When he asks her what happens after the knight rescues her, she responds, "She rescues him right back", and kisses him.

== Cast ==
- Richard Gere as Edward Lewis, a wealthy corporate raider from New York who hires Vivian to be his escort for a week
- Julia Roberts as Vivian Ward, a free-spirited Hollywood street walker
- Ralph Bellamy as Jim Morse, owner of Morse Industries, a troubled shipbuilding company Edward plans to take over
- Jason Alexander as Philip Stuckey, Edward's insensitive lawyer
- Héctor Elizondo as Barnard "Barney" Thompson, the dignified and soft-hearted hotel manager
- Laura San Giacomo as Kit De Luca, Vivian's sarcastic, wisecracking best friend and roommate who taught her the prostitution trade
- Alex Hyde-White as David Morse, Jim Morse's grandson, who is being groomed to take over the Morses' shipbuilding company
- Amy Yasbeck as Elizabeth Stuckey, Philip's wife
- Elinor Donahue as Bridget, a friend of Barney Thompson's who works in a women's clothing store
- John David Carson as Mark Roth, a businessman in Edward's office
- Judith Baldwin, as Susan, is one of Edward's ex-girlfriends into whom he runs at Phil's party at the beginning of the film. She has recently married and Edward's secretary was a bridesmaid.
- Patrick Richwood as Dennis Rowland
- James Patrick Stuart as Day Bellhop
- Dey Young as a snobbish saleswoman in a clothing store
- Larry Miller as Mr. Hollister, the manager of a clothing store where Vivian buys her new wardrobe
- Hank Azaria as a detective (film debut)
- Larry Hankin as a landlord

== Production ==
=== Development ===
The film was initially conceived as a dark drama about prostitution in Los Angeles in the 1980s. The relationship between Vivian and Edward also originally included Vivian being addicted to drugs; part of the deal was that she had to stay off cocaine for a week. Edward eventually throws her out of his car and drives off. The original script by J. F. Lawton, called 3000, ended with Vivian and her prostitute friend on the bus to Disneyland. Producer Laura Ziskin considered these elements detrimental to a sympathetic portrayal of Vivian, and they were removed or assigned to Kit. The deleted scenes have been found, and some were included on the DVD released for the film's 15th anniversary. In one, Vivian tells Edward, "I could just pop ya good and be on my way," indicating her lack of interest in "pillow talk". In another, she is confronted by a drug dealer, Carlos, then rescued by Edward when the limo driver Darryl gets his gun out.

Though inspired by such films as Wall Street and The Last Detail, the film bears a resemblance to Pygmalion myths: particularly George Bernard Shaw's play of the same name, which also formed the basis for the Broadway musical My Fair Lady. Walt Disney Studios then-president Jeffrey Katzenberg insisted the film be rewritten as a modern-day fairy tale and love story, as opposed to the original dark drama. It was pitched to Touchstone Pictures and rewritten as a romantic comedy. The title 3000 was changed because Disney executives thought it sounded like a title for a science-fiction film.

=== Casting ===
The casting of the film was a rather lengthy process. Marshall had initially considered Christopher Reeve, Daniel Day-Lewis, Kevin Kline, and Denzel Washington for the role of Edward; and Albert Brooks, Sylvester Stallone, Tom Berenger, Christopher Lambert, Al Pacino, and Burt Reynolds turned it down. Pacino went as far as doing a casting reading with Roberts before rejecting the part as he had just been cast in The Godfather Part III. Sam Neill, Tom Conti and Charles Grodin tested for the part along with Roberts. Gere initially refused but when he met with Roberts, she persuaded him and he eventually agreed to play Lewis. He reportedly started off much more active in his role; but Garry Marshall took him aside and said "No, no, no, Richard. In this movie, one of you moves and one of you does not. Guess which one you are?"

Roberts was not the first choice for the role of Vivian and was not wanted by Disney. Many other actresses were considered. Marshall originally envisioned Karen Allen for the role; when she declined, auditions went to many better-known actresses of the time including Molly Ringwald, who turned it down as she felt "there was something icky" about the story. Winona Ryder auditioned, but was turned down because Marshall thought she was "too young". Jennifer Connelly was also dismissed for the same reason. Emily Lloyd turned it down as it conflicted with her shooting for the film Mermaids. Drew Barrymore, Patricia Arquette, Brooke Shields, Uma Thurman, Kristin Davis, and Rebecca Schaeffer also auditioned for the role of Vivian. Meg Ryan, who was the studio and Marshall's top choice, also turned it down. According to a note written by Marshall, Mary Steenburgen was also among the first choices. Diane Lane came very close to being cast (the script was much darker at the time); they had gone as far as costume fittings, but due to scheduling conflicts she could not accept. Michelle Pfeiffer turned the role down, saying she did not like the script's "tone." Supermodel Janice Dickinson claimed she was also considered by Marshall but dropped out after being unable to audition in a room full of people. Daryl Hannah was considered but believed the role was "degrading to women". Valeria Golino was not selected because of her thick Italian accent, and Jennifer Jason Leigh had auditioned. Lea Thompson unsuccessfully auditioned for the role as she thought the film was a drama.

After all the other actresses turned down the role, 21-year-old Roberts, a relative unknown with only the sleeper hit Mystic Pizza (1988) and the yet-to-be-released Steel Magnolias (1989), for which she would be nominated for the Academy Award for Best Supporting Actress, won the role of Vivian. J. F. Lawton, writer of the original screenplay, has suggested that the film was ultimately given a happy ending because of the chemistry of Gere and Roberts.

Veteran actor Ralph Bellamy, who plays James Morse, appears in his final acting performance before his death in 1991. Jason Alexander, who had also recently been cast for his role as the bumbling George Costanza in Seinfeld, was cast as Philip Stuckey.

=== Filming ===
The film's budget was substantial, at $14 million, so producers could shoot in many locations. Most filming took place in Los Angeles, California, specifically in Beverly Hills, and inside soundstages at Walt Disney Studios in Burbank. The escargot scene at the restaurant was shot at Rex II Ristorante, now named Cicada. Interior scenes set in the Beverly Wilshire Hotel lobby were shot at the Ambassador Hotel in Los Angeles. Filming commenced on July 24, 1989, but was immediately plagued by problems. These included Ferrari and Porsche declining the product placement opportunity for the car Edward drove, as neither firm wished to be associated with prostitutes. Lotus Cars saw the placement value and supplied a Silver 1989 1/2 Esprit SE (which was later sold).

Filming was a generally pleasant, easygoing experience, as the budget was broad and the shooting schedule was not tight. While shooting the scene in which Vivian is lying down on the floor of Edward's penthouse, watching reruns of I Love Lucy, Garry Marshall had to tickle Roberts' feet (out of camera range) to get her to laugh. The scene in which Gere playfully snaps the lid of a jewelry case on her fingers was improvised, and her surprised laugh was unscripted. The red dress Vivian wears to the opera has been listed among the most unforgettable dresses of all time.

During the scene in which Roberts sang a Prince song in the bathtub, slid down, and submerged her head under the bubbles, she emerged to find the crew had left except for the cameraman, who captured the moment on film. In the love scene, she was so stressed that a vein became noticeable on her forehead and had to be massaged by Marshall and Gere. She also developed a case of hives, and calamine lotion was used to soothe her skin until filming resumed.

Shelley Michelle acted as body double for Roberts in risqué scenes and the film's publicity poster. Filming wrapped on October 18, 1989.

== Reception ==
=== Box office ===
In its opening weekend, the film was at number one at the US box office, grossing $11,280,591 and averaging $8,513 per theater. Despite dropping to number two in its second weekend, it grossed more with $12,471,670. It returned to number one at the US box office in its sixth weekend and was number one for three weeks. It was in the Top 10 movies in the US for 16 weeks. In Australia, it was number one for 12 weeks and was number one for nine consecutive weeks in the UK. As of September 29, 2009, it has grossed $178,406,268 in the United States and $285,000,000 in other countries for a total worldwide gross of US$463,406,268. It was the second highest-grossing film of the year in the United States and Canada and the third highest-grossing worldwide. The film was Disney's highest-grossing film ever, surpassing Three Men and a Baby. It was also Disney's highest-grossing R-rated release until Deadpool & Wolverine surpassed it in 2024. It is the fourth-highest grossing romantic comedy film to date.

=== Critical response ===
Pretty Woman received mixed reviews from critics, with positive reviews praising the stars' chemistry and the dialogue. On review aggregator Rotten Tomatoes the film holds an approval rating of 65% based on 78 reviews, with an average rating of 6/10. The website's critical consensus states, "Pretty Woman may be a yuppie fantasy, but the film's slick comedy, soundtrack, and casting can overcome misgivings." On Metacritic, the film has a weighted average score of 51 out of 100, based on 18 critics, indicating "mixed or average reviews." Audiences polled by CinemaScore gave the film an average grade of "A" on an A+ to F scale.

The film's detractors criticized the overuse of the "hooker with a heart of gold" trope. Others opined that the film sugarcoats the realities of sex work. Gary Giddins wrote, "In the insidious Pretty Woman, all women who aren't explicitly identified as tramps are gold-digging wives or snooty shopkeepers. It's the kind of working-class fantasy that wants the men in the audience to identify with a ruthless corporate pirate (Richard Gere) and the woman to identify with a simple but grandhearted streetwalker (Julia Roberts), who, given a chance, could be a lady's lady....The attempted laughs (few succeed) are at her expense."

Owen Gleiberman of Entertainment Weekly gave the film a "D," saying it "starts out as a neo-Pygmalion comedy" and becomes a "plastic screwball soap opera", with the "kinds of characters who exist nowhere but in the minds of callowly manipulative Hollywood screenwriters". Gleiberman conceded that with the film's "tough-hooker heroine, it can work as a feminist version of an upscale princess fantasy." He also said it "pretends to be about how love transcends money," but "is really obsessed with status symbols." On the film's twentieth anniversary, Gleiberman wrote another article addressing his original review, saying that while he felt some of his criticisms were valid, he would have given it a "B" today.

Roger Ebert of the Chicago Sun-Times gave a positive review, praising how the film is about:

... a particularly romantic kind of love, the sort you hardly see in the movies these days. [It] protects its fragile love story in the midst of cynicism and compromise. The performances are critical for that purpose. Gere plays new notes here; his swagger is gone, and he's more tentative, proper, even shy. Roberts does an interesting thing; she gives her character an irrepressibly bouncy sense of humor and then lets her spend the movie trying to repress it. Actresses who can do that and look great can have whatever they want in Hollywood.

The New York Times' Janet Maslin wrote: "Despite this quintessentially late 80's outlook, and despite a covetousness and underlying misogyny that bring Mr. Marshall's earlier 'Overboard' to mind, 'Pretty Woman' manages to be giddy, lighthearted escapism much of the time. Ms. Roberts, as noted, is a complete knockout, and this performance will make her a major star...Mr. Gere is mildly constrained by the button-down aspects of Edward's character, but he manages to be dapper, amusing, and the perfect foil. Though it has not been that long since he himself was on the other side of the Hollywood gigolo equation, he conveys a dignity and presence well suited to a soon-to-be-radicalized captain of industry."

Carina Chocano of The New York Times said the movie "wasn't a love story, it was a money story. Its logic depended on a disconnect between character and narrative, between image and meaning, between money and value, and that made it not cluelessly traditional but thoroughly postmodern." In a 2019 interview, Roberts expressed uncertainty over whether the film could be made today due to its controversial premise, commenting, "So many things you could poke a hole in, but I don't think it takes away from people being able to enjoy it".

=== Accolades ===
Award	Category	Nominee(s)	Result
Academy Awards	Best Actress	Julia Roberts	Nominated
BMI Film & TV Awards	Film Music Award	James Newton Howard	Won
BMI Film & TV Awards	Most Performed Song from a Film	"It Must Have Been Love" – Per Gessle	Won
British Academy Film Awards	Best Film	Arnon Milchan, Steven Reuther and Garry Marshall	Nominated
British Academy Film Awards	Best Actress in a Leading Role	Julia Roberts	Nominated
British Academy Film Awards	Best Screenplay – Original	J. F. Lawton	Nominated
British Academy Film Awards	Best Costume Design	Marilyn Vance	Nominated
César Awards	Best Foreign Film	Garry Marshall	Nominated
David di Donatello Awards	Best Foreign Actress	Julia Roberts	Nominated
Golden Globe Awards	Best Motion Picture – Musical or Comedy		Nominated
Golden Globe Awards	Best Actress in a Motion Picture – Musical or Comedy	Julia Roberts	Won
Golden Globe Awards	Best Actor in a Motion Picture – Musical or Comedy	Richard Gere	Nominated
Golden Globe Awards	Best Supporting Actor – Motion Picture	Hector Elizondo	Nominated
Golden Screen Awards			Won
Jupiter Awards	Best International Actress	Julia Roberts	Won
Kids' Choice Awards	Favorite Movie Actress	Julia Roberts	Won
People's Choice Awards	Favorite Comedy Motion Picture		Won
Writers Guild of America Awards	Best Screenplay – Written Directly for the Screen	J. F. Lawton	Nominated

American Film Institute lists:

- AFI's 100 Years... 100 Passions – No. 21

=== Home media ===
Pretty Woman was released on VHS on October 19, 1990, by Touchstone Home Video. It proved very successful in the home video market, becoming the best selling video of 1991 in the United states, and the 2nd most rented film in the United States for 1991.

== Music ==
The soundtrack features the songs (among others):

- "Oh, Pretty Woman" by Roy Orbison, which inspired its title
- Roxette's "It Must Have Been Love," originally released in December 1987, reached No. 1 on the Billboard Hot 100 in June 1990
- "King of Wishful Thinking" by Go West
- "Show Me Your Soul" by Red Hot Chili Peppers
- "No Explanation" by Peter Cetera
- "Wild Women Do" by Natalie Cole
- "Fallen" by Lauren Wood

The soundtrack has been certified triple platinum by the Recording Industry Association of America (RIAA).

The opera featured in the film is La Traviata, which also served as inspiration for its plot. The highly dramatic aria fragment that is repeated is the end of "Dammi tu forza!" ("Give me strength!"), from the opera. Roberts sings the song "Kiss" by Prince while she is in the tub and Gere's character is on the phone. Background music is composed by James Newton Howard. The piano piece Gere's character plays in the hotel lobby was improvised on the spot by Gere himself, as he states in this interview.

== Musical adaptation ==
A stage musical adaptation of the film opened on Broadway on July 20, 2018, in previews, officially on August 16 at the Nederlander Theatre. This follows an out-of-town tryout at the Oriental Theatre in Chicago, which ran from March 13 to April 15, 2018. The musical has music and lyrics by Bryan Adams and Jim Vallance; the late Garry Marshall and J. F. Lawton wrote the book; and Jerry Mitchell is the director and choreographer. The Chicago and Broadway cast featured Samantha Barks, in her Broadway debut as Vivian and Steve Kazee as Edward. Barks finished her run as Vivian on July 21, 2019, and was replaced by Jillian Mueller the following evening, with Brennin Hunt, of Rent fame, assuming the role of Edward. Orfeh portrayed Kit, and Jason Danieley played Philip Stuckey. Eric Anderson portrayed the role of Mr. Thompson and Kingsley Leggs played the role of James Morse.

The UK and Ireland stage musical tour commenced in the fall of 2023. The show opened in Bristol with cast members, Amber Davies as Vivian, Oliver Savile as Edward. Ore Oduba played Mr Thompson. The tour ran through 2024.
