= Embrace of the Vampire =

1995 film by Anne Goursaud

- Theatrical release poster
- Directed by: Anne Goursaud
- Written by: Halle Eaton; Nicole Coady; Rick Bitzelberger
- Produced by: Marilyn Vance; Alan Mruvka
- Starring: Alyssa Milano; Martin Kemp; Harold Pruett; Charlotte Lewis; Jennifer Tilly
- Cinematography: Suki Medencevic
- Edited by: Terilyn A. Shropshire
- Music by: Joseph Stanley Williams
- Distributed by: New Line Cinema
- Release date: May 30, 1995 (United States)
- Running time: 92 minutes
- Country: United States
- Language: English
- Budget: $500,000

Embrace of the Vampire is a 1995 American erotic horror film directed by Anne Goursaud. It stars Alyssa Milano as Charlotte, a chaste girl who is haunted by a vampire played by Martin Kemp.

== Plot ==
Charlotte is a young college student.

A "chaste" girl who is having erotic dreams when she meets a handsome yet mysterious European vampire, who was himself bitten by nymph vampires long ago. He sees Charlotte as the reincarnation of his long-lost lover, the Beautiful servant to a princess. Charlotte's dreams interfere with her relationship with her more mundane boyfriend, Chris. Charlotte is drawn towards the Vampire's world, but she is disturbed by her longings. Charlotte is torn, realizing that not only must she choose between her boyfriend and her erotic night-time visitor, but also between light and dark, and good and evil.

The Vampire gives Charlotte an ankh that alters her behavior when she wears it. Under its influence, Charlotte starts behaving wantonly, going to a party wearing ankle boots and a short, low-cut dress. She has her drink spiked; after she briefly kisses a student called Milo, they are interrupted by his girlfriend, Eliza, the "campus slut." The Vampire kills Eliza by banging her head against Charlotte's door, and then licks the blood from the door as Charlotte listens in a state of arousal from the other side.

Charlotte drifts in and out of her dream state, as The Vampire tells her to come to him. He believes there is nothing left for her here (on Earth), and he only has hours to exist… unless he can get Charlotte to love him. After some dream scenes, Charlotte is in the tower with The Vampire. Chris arrives to save Charlotte, but The Vampire pushes Chris away and is about to bite Charlotte when she utters Chris's name; he tells her not to think of Chris and instead to think of him and her as a couple. After Charlotte calls out Chris's name again, the Vampire warns her that she cannot take Chris's love to the eternal life he was offering her… and so he disappears.

The story concludes with Charlotte and Chris awakening in the morning, sharing a tender kiss, while The Vampire meets his demise in his desolate room.

== Cast ==
- Alyssa Milano as Charlotte Wells
- Martin Kemp as The Vampire
- Harrison Pruett as Chris
- Jordan Ladd as Eliza
- Rachel True as Nicole
- Charlotte Lewis as Sarah
- Jennifer Tilly as Marika
- Rebecca Ferratti as Princess
- John Riedlinger as Milo

== Production ==
Regarding her nude scenes in the film, Milano said in a 1995 interview, "I'm not going to say that I was manipulated into doing things that I didn't want to do. I did it because it was a woman director and I felt protected. And I learned a lot as far as knowing where the camera is and what coverage they need so that it's not all explicit."

In an interview published in 2005, director Anne Goursaud said the film "was made for $500,000 in thirteen days". She estimates that thanks to video sales, "it has made maybe $15 million".

== Reception ==
In a retrospective positive review for Fangoria, Alexandra Heller-Nicholas wrote of the film, "Embrace of the Vampire is good, trashy, '90s fun, and with the broader compelling stories about Milano and Goursaud to go along with it, it makes for quite a ride."
