= Scott Kauffman =

American business manager (born 1956)

Scott L. Kauffman
- Born: 1956 (age 69–70); Princeton, New Jersey
- Education: Vassar College; New York University
- Occupation: Businessman
- Title: Chairman and CEO, MDC Partners
- Children: 2
- Parent(s): Ellwood Kauffman (father); Shirley Kauffman (mother)
- Relatives: Jane (sister), Geoffrey (brother), Matthew (brother)

Scott L. Kauffman (born 1956) is an American business manager. He is currently chair and CEO of the advertising holding company MDC Partners. In July 1992, Advertising Age named him one of the top 100 marketers in the country and was named in 1996 as one of twenty "Digital Media Masters".

== Early life and education ==
He was born in Princeton, New Jersey to Ellwood and Shirley Kauffman, and grew up with his sister Jane, and brothers Geoffrey and Matthew.

Kauffman holds an A.B. in English from Vassar College and an MBA in marketing from New York University's Stern School of Business.

In 1973, he appeared briefly in Steven E. de Souza's first film, Arnold's Wrecking Co.

== Career ==
Throughout his career, Kauffman has worked for a variety of media companies including Benton & Bowles, Newsweek, and Time Warner in the founding of Entertainment Weekly.

His next job was as a vice-president of CompuServe, where he worked on all of the online brands and pioneered SpryNet, CompuServe's ISP service. With help from Goldman Sachs, Kauffman participated in the development of one of the first IPOs of the Internet industry. He left CompuServe in 1997 to become president and CEO of ClickOver, a company focused on developing management solutions for Internet advertising. ClickOver later became Adknowledge after acquiring Focalink. Before leaving AdKnowledge and the company was sold to CMGI, AdKnowledge grew to over 80 employees with more than 100 customers.

Kauffman then spent time with eCoverage, a direct-to-consumer online insurance company; Coremetrics, which was acquired by IBM in 2010; and MusicNow, an online music service partnered with FullAudio that was later sold to Circuit City.

In 2005, he became CEO of the San Francisco-based digital-magazine service provider Zinio.

In 2006, Scott was named president and chief operating officer of BlueLithium. On December 4, 2008, he was named CEO of Geeknet, the owner of SourceForge.net, ThinkGeek, Slashdot, and Freecode.

Kauffman became chairman of the board of directors of MDC Partners in 2006. He was appointed CEO in 2015 after then-CEO Miles Nadal was investigated by the U.S. Securities and Exchange Commission.

== Other activities ==
Kauffman is the chairman of the board of directors of both ChooseEnergy.com and Lotame, as well as a board member of Vindicia.

In addition, he is actively involved in supporting ALS research after his son was diagnosed at the age of 27. In addition to being involved with multiple ALS-related organizations, he serves Chairman of the board of the ALS Association. Furthermore, Kauffman is founder and chairman of his own ALS organization, Iron Horse Foundation.
