= Digging to China =

1997 American drama film

- Theatrical release poster
- Directed by: Timothy Hutton
- Written by: Karen Janszen
- Produced by: Marilyn Vance; Alan Mruvka; J. Todd Harris; John Davis
- Starring: Kevin Bacon; Mary Stuart Masterson; Cathy Moriarty; Evan Rachel Wood
- Cinematography: Jörgen Persson
- Edited by: Dana Congdon; Alain Jakubowicz
- Music by: Cynthia Millar
- Distributed by: Moonstone Entertainment
- Release dates: July 16, 1997 (Giffoni Film Festival); September 11, 1998 (United States)
- Running time: 103 minutes
- Country: United States
- Language: English
- Budget: $2.5 million

Digging to China is a 1997 American drama film that marked the cinematic directorial debut of actor Timothy Hutton and the screen debut of Evan Rachel Wood. The screenplay by Karen Janszen, the film focuses on the friendship forged between a pre-teen girl with a vivid imagination and a man with mental disabilities.

== Plot ==
Set in the mid-1960s, the story centers on ten-year-old Harriet Frankovitz, a lonely outcast who lives with her mother and older sister Gwen in a dilapidated New Hampshire motel with cabins shaped like tipis her mother received as part of her divorce settlement. Harriet has a strong desire to escape her dull existence by means of any one of a number of creative ways - a magic carpet she tries to fly off the roof, on board a flying saucer she anxiously awaits in the schoolyard, through a tunnel she has been digging to China, or by attaching helium-filled balloons to a lawn chair. Mrs. Frankovitz is a bitter alcoholic with a propensity for driving on the wrong side of the road, while Gwen has sexual encounters with a series of men in vacant rooms. Terminally ill Leah Schroth is en route to an institution where she plans to admit her intellectually disabled son Ricky when their car breaks down near the motel, and the two stay there while waiting for the vehicle to be repaired. Mrs. Frankovitz is killed in an automobile accident, and Harriet discovers Gwen is her biological mother. The distressed girl and her new friend run away and set up house in an abandoned caboose concealed beneath dense foliage in the woods. When Ricky becomes ill, Harriet is forced to seek medical assistance for him. Once he recovers, his mother sets off with him to complete their interrupted journey, leaving Gwen and Harriet to learn to interact in their new roles of mother and daughter.

== Cast ==
- Evan Rachel Wood as Harriet Frankovitz
- Kevin Bacon as Ricky Schroth
- Mary Stuart Masterson as Gwen Frankovitz
- Cathy Moriarty as Mrs. Frankovitz
- Marian Seldes as Leah Schroth

== Production notes ==
The film was shot in Cherokee, North Carolina. The classroom setting was filmed in Whittier, North Carolina.

The soundtrack includes "One Big Love" by Patty Griffin, "Last Train to Clarksville" by The Monkees, "Mas Que Nada" by Sérgio Mendez and Brazil '66, "Iko Iko" by The Dixie Cups, "Soul Sauce" by Cal Tjader, "Crimson and Clover" by Tommy James and the Shondells, "El Lobo" by Herb Alpert, "Samba Pa Ti" by Carlos Santana, and "Magic Carpet Ride" by Steppenwolf.

The film premiered at the Giffoni Film Festival on July 16, 1997.

== Reception ==
=== Critical response ===
Upon its release, Digging to China received mediocre reviews from critics. On Rotten Tomatoes, the film has an approval rating of 33% based on 6 reviews, with an average rating of 4.2/10.

In his review in The New York Times, Stephen Holden said the film "doesn't grab at the heartstrings and strum an aggressively mawkish ballad. In fact, it could do with a bit more heart. Part of the problem is Ms. Wood's Harriet. The young actress is radiantly photogenic, but her performance is muted and monochromatic ... Without an incandescent performance at its center, Digging to China follows the same path as Harriet's balloon escape. It gets stuck in the trees."

Peter Stack of the San Francisco Chronicle called it a "cloying, superficial story [that] ends up forced and predictable ... Bacon's portrayal of Ricky, who is disabled by a nerve disease that contorts his body and face, ranges from adequate to almost touching. But it's the desperate, contrived storytelling that makes the film a chore to watch ... [its] saving grace is that it's lush and visually attractive."

In the San Francisco Examiner, Walter Addiego described it as "an uneasy mixture of afterschool special and art-house project" and "well-intentioned but ultimately sentimental" and added, "It nonetheless offers some good performances and nice, low-key observations about the predicament of outsiders ... Considering the material, Hutton should be commended. There's just enough going on in Digging to China to suggest real directorial talent, and I hope he can build on this foundation."

Dennis Harvey of Variety wrote that the screenplay "spends so much time anticipating a big goodbye that it seems less touching than simply overdue. [It] doesn't work up much in the realm of character depth, either." He briefly remarked that the actress Cathy Moriarty "gets little to do before exiting the pic, providing scant basis for Harriet's pre-existing domestic unrest, while Seldes' tired, anxious looks can't fill out a similarly underwritten role." He also said that "Masterson's more expansive one travels a short, blunt road from initial irritation to misguided overprotectiveness." Referring to the direction of the film, the reviewer remarked "a pro but uninspired job with the mediocre material. He can't salvage the more poorly conceived scenes … and, despite good production design, the period flavor is too often evoked by leaning on a predictable soundtrack of '60s hits."

=== Awards and nominations ===
Award	Category	Recipient	Result	Ref.
Giffoni Film Festival	Best Actor	Kevin Bacon	Won	
Giffoni Film Festival	Campania Regional Council Award	Digging to China	Won	
Chicago International Children's Film Festival	Children's Jury Award	Digging to China	Won	

== See also ==
- Antipodes
