= Red dress of Julia Roberts =

Dress featured in the 1990 film Pretty Woman

- Designer: Marilyn Vance
- Year: 1990
- Type: Off-the-shoulder evening gown

Julia Roberts wore a red dress in the 1990 romantic comedy film Pretty Woman. The ensemble was created by costume designer Marilyn Vance, and is worn during a "transformative" scene in the film where Roberts' character accompanies her love interest to a night at the opera. Thirty years after the film's release, Vogue Paris called the off-the-shoulder evening gown “iconic”, and said that it helped make the romantic comedy "legendary".

== Background and design ==
Pretty Woman (1990) is a film depicting a sex worker who discovers high society while embarking on romance with a millionaire. The ensemble is worn during a "transformative" scene in the film, in which Roberts' character, Vivian Ward, accompanies her love interest to a night at the opera.

The production studio had instructed Vance to make the gown black to prevent clashing with Roberts' red hair. But Vance pursued her concept, designing three dresses of various shades and putting Roberts through multiple screen tests to persuade director Garry Marshall. Marshall was heavily involved with the fashion of the film and collaborated with Vance on the final look's design.

The dress is a scarlet red sculptural column evening gown with a low back, off-the-shoulder detail, a plunging sweetheart neckline, and a drape tied around the hips. The ensemble was accessorized with a complementary ruby diamond necklace and white opera gloves. It exhibited ruffled detailing and voluminous sleeves, in line with 1990s fashion trends.

In Pretty Woman, Roberts portrays Vivian Ward, a Hollywood Boulevard prostitute who entertains older businessman Edward Lewis (Richard Gere) and subsequently falls in love with him. Vance used her style to portray the character's evolution in the film as her fashion becomes more polished and minimalist, inspired by Edward. The dress was designed to be "diametrically opposite" to her revealing outfits at the beginning of the film. The gown is worn during a "pivotal transformation" sequence, which presents [Vivian] as a "real lady" before an evening at the opera. The scene where Roberts wears the gown has been referred to as cinematically significant and an "all-time movie moment", featuring improvisation intended by Gere for the film's gag reel. In the film, Edward surprises Vivian by snapping a necklace case on her fingers, with Roberts letting out a "yelping" and "iconic" laugh. Marshall later referred to it as "the trademark for the movie".

== Reception and legacy ==
Harper's Bazaar and Grazia Daily have called the gown the most famous costume piece in the film. Johanna Cox of Elle described the piece as "one of the most famous red dresses in film history". The gown was reproduced for the musical adaption of Pretty Woman, with a "more relaxed and less corset-like" design. Los Angeles brand Reformation released a version of the gown in 2014, called 'the Bali dress'. Marie Claire framed the gown as one of the most unforgettable pieces in cinema. Entertainment Weekly included it in a list describing "20 of pop culture's most show-stopping red dresses", while Parade featured the frock as one of the most iconic red dresses in film. It was exhibited at the Victoria & Albert Museum in 2014. Vance was nominated for the BAFTA Award for Best Costume Design in 1990 for her work on Pretty Woman.

Floriane Reynaud of Vogue Paris wrote that the dress was "eye-catching, incredibly sexy without losing an ounce of elegance… all of the attention is now focused on Vivian, who we now view from a different perspective: one of admiration instead of disdain." Writing for Harper's Bazaar, Kerry Pieri expressed that the gown echoed the spirit of Valentino. People declared that the dress "she wears when she goes from duckling to swan [...] has a wow factor that goes unmatched". Marie Claire described the dress as "gorgeously draped" and stated that "when Edward fell in love with [Vivian] that night, we did too." In an analysis on red in film fashion, Refinery29 wrote that Vivian "connotes new — and commanding — elegance in her red ballgown and opera gloves." Entertainment Weekly's Mary Sollosi dubbed the piece as Vivian's "true Cinderella moment."

== See also ==
- List of individual dresses
- Green dress of Keira Knightley
- White dress of Marilyn Monroe
- Pink dress of Marilyn Monroe
- Black Givenchy dress of Audrey Hepburn
