= Assorted Nuts Animation Studios =

Animation studio based in Karlstad, Sweden

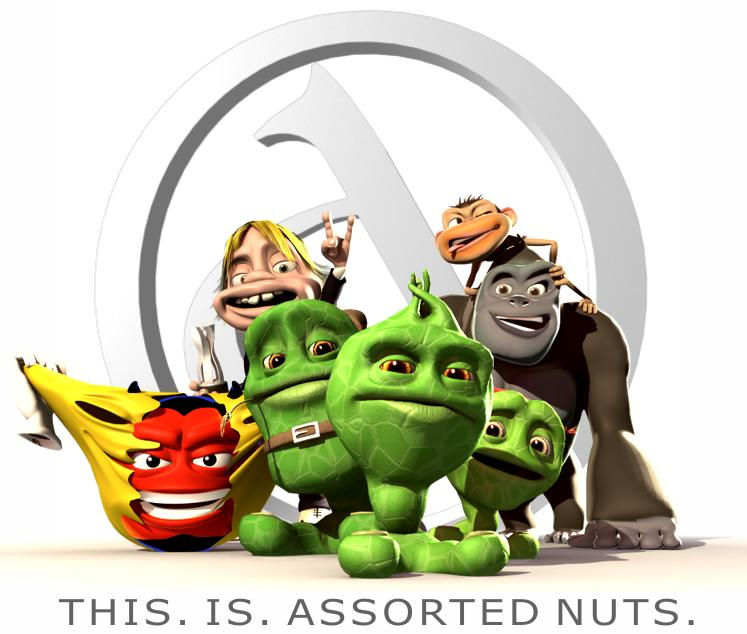
- Industry: Animated
- Founded: 2002
- Founder: Magnus Jansson
- Headquarters: Järnvägsgatan 10, 652 25 Karlstad, Sweden, Karlstad, Sweden
- Number of locations: Karlstad, Sweden; Santa Monica, Los Angeles
- Key people: Magnus Jansson, CEO / Creative Director; Lee Adams, SVP Marketing / Licensing & Business Development Erik Öhrner, COO & Business Relations; Bo Landin, Chairman of the Board
- Products: Animated films
- Owner: Magnus Jansson
- Divisions: Assorted Nuts Entertainment
- Website: theassortednuts.com

Assorted Nuts Animation Studios, headquartered in Karlstad, Sweden, is an independent animation studio and development/production house that creates animated films and characters. The studio makes animated feature films, TV series and on-demand content for international markets that, in the words of its founder, Magnus Jansson, has subjects 'spanning all age-groups and genres, from pre-school to family entertainment to adult comedy.'

The studio has an American subsidiary, Assorted Nuts Entertainment, founded in 2012 and located in Santa Monica, Los Angeles.

== Founding ==
The company was founded in 2002 by Magnus Jansson, Erik Öhrner, Emil Cederman and Johan Kirppu while they were still students at Karlstad University, and began operations in 2003.

== Studio ==
=== Locations ===
The main headquarters of Assorted Nuts is located in Karlstad. A new arm of Assorted Nuts Animation Studios opened in Santa Monica, Los Angeles in 2012 under the title Assorted Nuts Entertainment and led by Lee Adams, the former Toonzone Studios Vice President of Marketing.

== Filmography ==
=== The Goob ===
The Goob is an animated series featuring adventures of the character Dwayne 'The Goob' Dunderson from rural Alabama in the American Deep South as he travels towards Hollywood and dreams of stardom. The Goob blogs his travels on his camera phone, establishing the series as the world's first to feature a 3D animated blogger.

The Goob earned Magnus Jansson and Assorted Nuts the 2010 Streamy Award for 'Best Animation in a Web-Series'. The animated series also achieved over 5 million mobile downloads and The Goob character was signed by EMI as a recording artist, releasing a dance remix of the Country song "Feel The Free".

The Goob was picked up by the American online network Toon Goggles in September 2012, and by October it was the network's number 2 rated show. It premiered in the US on Strike.TV.

=== Monkey Business ===
'Monkey Business' features the Tom & Jerry-esque slapstick comedy antics of two characters on a jungle island - Ben the seasoned monkey and Al the young gorilla. The series was chosen by Cartoon Forums to be presented at an international fair in Toulouse and had its UK premiere on the BBC's CBBC channel in 2010.

=== Jumping Green Things ===
Assorted Nuts entered into a co-production with Tinopolis Ltd to create Jumping Green things, a 90-minute animated feature with the tagline They needed heroes. They got village idiots Originally scheduled for completion in 2005, the project was previewed at the Cartoon Movie festival of European animation in spring 2003.

=== My Pink World ===
An animated comedy about eleven-year-old Tiffany and her relationship with her father, Mike.

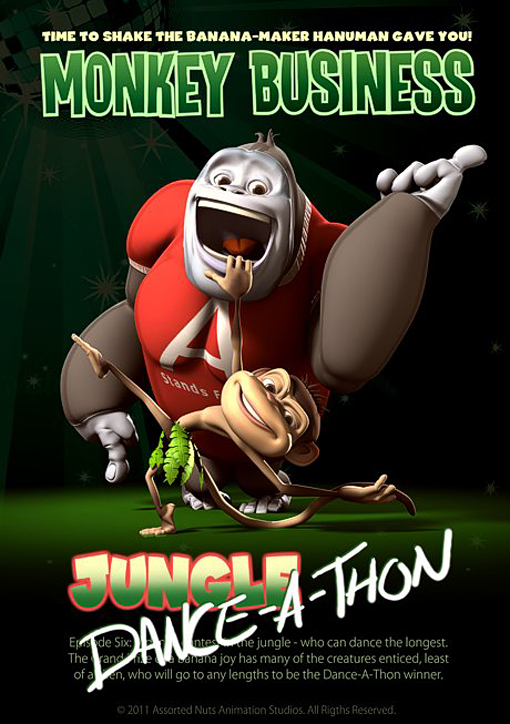
Assorted Nuts Studios' Monkey Business poster

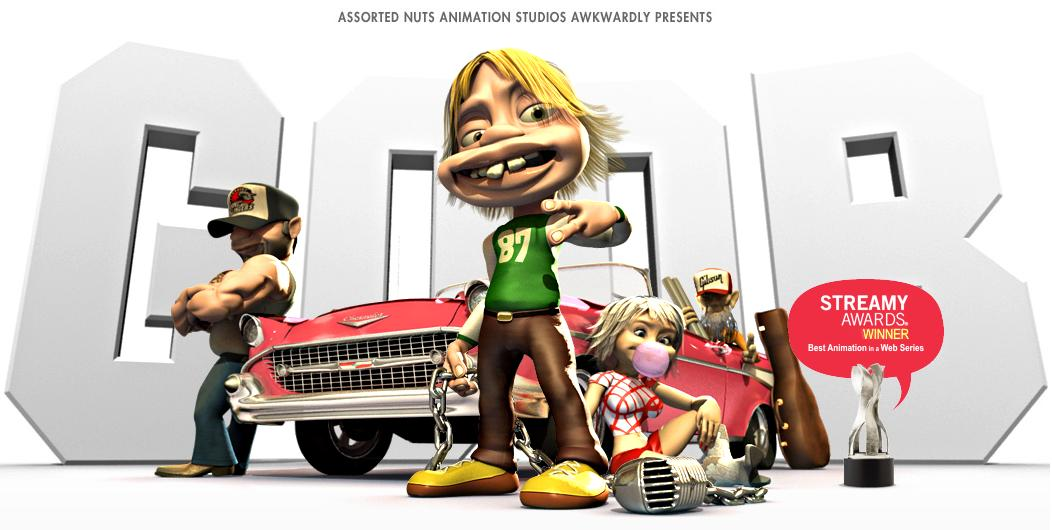
The studio's character, The Goob

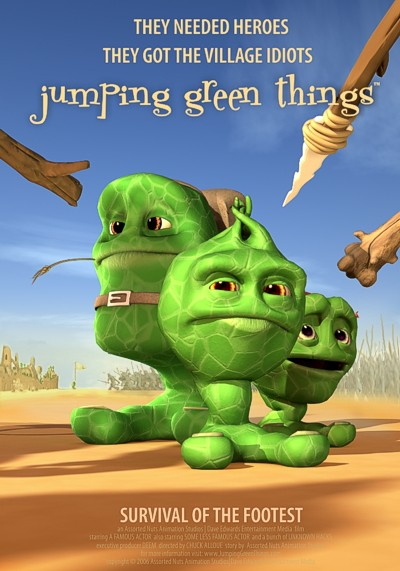
Feature poster for Jumping Green Things

== Awards ==
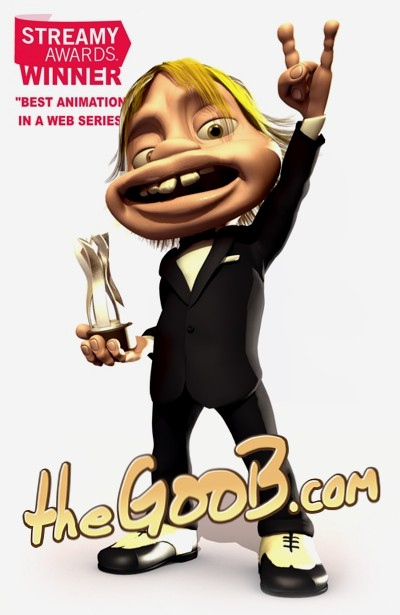

At the 2nd Annual Streamy Awards on Sunday, April 11, 2010, at the Orpheum Theatre in Los Angeles, California, Assorted Nuts's Magnus Jansson was awarded the Streamy Award for 'Best Animation in a Web-Series' by the International Academy of Web Television for the online series The Goob after the animated series first became a successful mobile download in 2008, achieving over five million mobile downloads in its first year.
