= Harold Pruett =

American actor (1969–2002)

- Born: Harold P. Pruett, Jr; April 13, 1969; Anchorage, Alaska, U.S.
- Died: February 21, 2002 (aged 32); Los Angeles, California, U.S.
- Resting place: Hollywood Forever Cemetery
- Other name: Harrison Pruett
- Occupation: Actor
- Years active: 1976–1998
- Spouse: Jennifer Cattell (m. 2001)
- Children: 1

Harold P. Pruett (April 13, 1969 – February 21, 2002) was an American film and television actor. He appeared in over 30 films and TV series from the 1970s to the 1990s.

== Career ==
Born in Anchorage, Alaska, Pruett made his acting debut at age five in the 1976 film Sybil, starring Sally Field. He went on to appear in Summer Camp Nightmare (1987), Embrace of the Vampire (1995) and Precious Find (1996).

During the 1970s and 1980s, Pruett guest starred on numerous television series including Wonder Woman, The New Leave It to Beaver, It's Your Move, Eye to Eye, The Best Times, Hotel and Night Court. In the late 1980s and early 1990s, he danced in several music videos including two for the pop singer Martika, "More Than You Know" (1989) and "Coloured Kisses" (1992).

In 1990, Pruett had his first co-starring television role on the NBC musical teen drama Hull High. Due to low ratings, the series was canceled in October 1990 after nine episodes. Later that year, he was cast as Steve Randle in the television adaptation of the 1967 S. E. Hinton novel The Outsiders, shown on Fox. That series was also canceled after one season because of low ratings. From 1992 to 1993, he had a recurring role as Brad Penny on the teen sitcom Parker Lewis. In 1995, he co-starred on another short lived Fox series, Medicine Ball. His last television appearance was in a recurring role on the Fox teen drama series Party of Five, in 1996. Pruett's final film appearance was in the independent drama The Right Way (1998), starring Geoff Pierson.

== Death ==
On February 21, 2002, Pruett died of an accidental drug overdose in Los Angeles. His funeral was held at Hollywood Forever Cemetery, where he was interred.

Pruett's mother and friends created the Harold Pruett Drug Abuse Foundation in his memory.

== Filmography ==
=== Films ===
Year	Title	Role	Notes
1981	Pennies from Heaven	Minor role	Uncredited
1987	Summer Camp Nightmare	Chris Wade	Credited as Harold P. Pruett
1988	Spellcaster	Tom	
1995	Embrace of the Vampire	Chris	Credited as Harrison Pruett
1996	Precious Find	Ben Rutherford	
1998	The Right Way		Filmed in 1993; released posthumously

=== Television ===
Year	Title	Role	Notes
1976	Sybil	Danny	Miniseries
1978	Wonder Woman	Boy	Episode: "Stolen Faces"
1979	Mirror, Mirror	Joey McLaren	Television movie
1982	Crisis Counselor		Episode: "Pill Addiction"
1983	ABC Afterschool Special	Neighbor boy	Episode: "The Woman Who Willed a Miracle"; Uncredited
1985	The New Leave It to Beaver	Ron	Episode: "Movin' On"
1985	It's Your Move	Boy No. 1	Episode: "The Dregs of Humanity" (Part 1)
1985	Eye to Eye		Episode: "Dick & Tracey"; Credited as Harold P. Pruett
1985	The Best Times	Wally	Episode: "Snake Meat"; Credited as Harold P. Pruett
1985	Hotel	Rod	Episode: "Wins and Losses"
1985	Night Court	Joey	Episode: "Wheels of Justice" (Part 1); Credited as Harold P. Pruett
1987	Our House	Mike	Episode: "The 100 Year Old Weekend"; Credited as Harold P. Pruett
1987	21 Jump Street	Elly	Episode: "Blindsided"
1988	The Fortunate Pilgrim	Gino	Miniseries; Credited as Harold P. Pruett
1988	ABC Afterschool Special	Gary Watson	Episode: "Daddy Can't Read"
1988	Scandal in a Small Town	Michael Bishop	Television movie Credited as Harold P. Pruett
1988	Aaron's Way	Tony Falcone	Episode: "Strong Foundations"
1989	I Know My First Name is Steven	Birch	Miniseries
1990	Lucky Chances	Dario Santangelo	Miniseries
1990	Hull High	Cody Rome	6 episodes
1990	The Outsiders	Steve Randle	13 episodes
1990	Heat Wave	John Riggs	Television movie
1992-1993	Parker Lewis Can't Lose	Brad Penny	8 episodes
1993	Walker, Texas Ranger	Ned Buchanon	Episode: "Bounty"
1995	Medicine Ball	Harley Spencer	8 episodes
1995	Divas		Television movie
1996	The Perfect Daughter	Ben Rutherford	Television movie
1996	Party of Five	Cooper Voight	3 episodes
