= E! =

American pay television channel

E! Entertainment Television
- Country: United States
- Broadcast area: Nationwide
- Headquarters: Los Angeles, California

Programming
- Language: English
- Picture format: 1080i HDTV (downscaled to letterboxed 480i for the SDTV feed)

Ownership
- Owner: Versant
- Sister channels: CNBC; MS NOW; Oxygen; Syfy; USA Network; Golf Channel

History
- Launched: July 31, 1987; 39 years ago
- Founder: Larry Namer; Alan Mruvka
- Former names: Movietime (1987–1990)

Links
- Website: eonline.com

Availability

Streaming media
- Streaming Services: Sling TV, YouTube TV, fuboTV, Hulu Live TV, DirecTV Stream
- Claro TV+: (requires subscription to access content)

E! Entertainment Television is an American basic cable television network owned by Versant. The channel focuses primarily on pop culture, celebrity-based reality shows and movies.

The channel was launched on July 31, 1987 as Movietime by multiple consortium cable providers (Comcast, Continental Cablevision, Cox Cable, TCI, and Warner Cable), HBO/Warner Communications, and various shareholders, with HBO directly programming and managing the network. Movietime was relaunched on June 1, 1990 as E! to emphasize its widening coverage of the celebrity–industrial complex, contemporary film, television and music, daily Hollywood gossip, and fashion. Comcast and Disney/ABC Cable Networks acquired the channel in 1997 before acquiring Disney's stake outright in 2006. E! became part of NBCUniversal's cable division in 2011; which along with its cable channels spun off to Versant in 2026.

As of November 2023, E! is available to approximately 71 million pay television households in the United States—down from its 2011 peak of 99 million households.

== History ==
=== Movietime ===
E! was originally launched on July 31, 1987, as Movietime, a service that aired movie trailers, entertainment news, event and awards coverage, and interviews as an early example of a national barker channel. The channel was founded by Larry Namer and Alan Mruvka. Early Movietime hosts included Greg Kinnear, Katie Wagner, Julie Moran, Suzanne Kay (daughter of Diahann Carroll), Mark DeCarlo, Sam Rubin and Richard Blade.

=== E! ===
Logo used from June 1, 1990, to July 8, 2012. It remained in use for international networks until they rebranded to the current logo.

Controlling ownership was originally held by a consortium of five cable television providers (Comcast, Continental Cablevision, Cox Cable, TCI, and Warner Cable), HBO/Warner Communications, and various founding shareholders, with HBO directly programming and managing the network. In 1989, after Time Inc. bought Warner Communications to fend off a takeover bid by Paramount, the new Time Warner company held four of the eight major ownership positions and took over management control of Movietime and renamed the network as E!: Entertainment Television on June 1, 1990 based in Los Angeles; this name change was made to emphasize its widening coverage of the celebrity–industrial complex, contemporary film, television and music, daily Hollywood gossip, and fashion.

In 1997, Comcast, one of the minority partners, teamed up with Disney/ABC Cable Networks to buy the channel after Time Warner had exercised their put agreement. Comcast increased the ownership stakes in the network through mergers with forerunners of TCI and Continental under various circumstances. In November 2006, Comcast acquired Disney's 39.5% share of E! for $1.23 billion to gain full ownership of the network as part of a broader programming carriage agreement between Disney/ABC and Comcast.

In January 2011, Comcast Entertainment Group, the company's television unit, became a division of the NBCUniversal Television Group, after Comcast acquired a 51% majority stake in NBCUniversal from General Electric. E!'s only sister networks prior to the NBC Universal merger were the now-defunct channels Style Network (then Esquire Network), PBS Kids Sprout and G4, along with Comcast's sports networks: Versus, Comcast SportsNet and Golf Channel. In the case of Versus, E! staff produced that network's Sports Soup and G4's Web Soup, while the Orlando-based Golf Channel featured no crossovers with E! at all due to incompatible audiences and operations. Versus and Golf Channel were taken under the direct control of the NBC Sports division, with the former being renamed NBC Sports Network in January 2012, and are no longer connected to their former sister networks beyond advertising and in-house operations.

On July 9, 2012, the channel introduced a revised logo (the first change to its logo since the network rebranded as E! in 1990), removing the exclamation mark background behind the "E" but keeping the exclamation point underneath, along with a new slogan "Pop of Culture", which coincided with the launch of the new series Opening Act. The network also started the process of introducing scripted programming (the first series, The Royals, premiering in March 2015), in addition to its existing reality and documentary series. The changes were announced during E!'s programming upfront presentation on April 30, 2012.

== Programming ==
=== News ===
E! is one of the few American general-entertainment cable channels that broadcast a daily news program in 2020s; its flagship entertainment news program was E! News, which debuted on September 1, 1991. The weekday program (which also has an hour-long weekend edition) features stories and gossip about celebrities, and the film, music and television industries, and has been broadcast under various formats since its launch, even being aired live for a time during the mid-2000s. It was first hosted by Dagny Hultgreen. Steve Kmetko was a host from 1994 to 2002. It has been hosted by Terrence Jenkins and Giuliana Rancic since 2012 and 2006, respectively, with Ryan Seacrest (who co-anchored the program from 2006 to 2012) serving as managing editor of the news operation.

E! News was the only entertainment news show on the channel for much of its history until 2006, when the channel launched The Daily 10, hosted by Sal Masekela and Catt Sadler (Debbie Matenopoulos also co-hosted from the show's inception until 2008); the series was cancelled in September 2010 after E! announced that the weekday editions of E! News would be expanded to one hour starting on October 25, 2010.

E! also carried a simulcast of business news channel Bloomberg Television from 2004 to January 2009, when the latter network had expanded its cable and satellite carriage to a level that allowed the discontinuation of the simulcast.

Outside E! News telecasts, the channel runs an E! News–branded news ticker displaying entertainment news headlines each half-hour during regular programming; fast-breaking entertainment headlines (such as a celebrity arrest or death) may also be displayed on a ticker, during any program when warranted.

On August 5, 2020, E! canceled both New York-based shows, along with In the Room, one of the first of many program and employee cuts and staff realignments announced across NBCUniversal that week due to the pandemic. The news operation continued to maintain the E! News website, and its social media presences. Two years later, E! announced that E! News would be revived as a late-night entertainment news program and would return to the E! network after a two-year hiatus, with Adrienne Bailon-Houghton and Justin Sylvester (the latter of whom returned to the show for the revival) serving as co-hosts; it premiered on November 14, 2022.

=== Original series ===
The network was known early on for its daily video simulcast of the Howard Stern Show, which aired from June 20, 1994, until July 8, 2005, weeknights in a truncated half-hour form, airing three times in late night. The program was discontinued several months after Stern moved to Sirius Satellite Radio and sold the video rights to his show to pay-per-view provider In Demand as a monthly pay offering (video rights are now held by SiriusXM).

E! is known for its live red carpet pre-shows for the industry's three prominent award shows, the Primetime Emmy Awards, the Golden Globe Awards, and the Academy Awards, and were famous for their fashion critiques by Joan Rivers; Rivers also hosted post-awards specials under the title Fashion Police, which became a regular weekly series in September 2010. In April 2017, it was announced that E! had acquired the People's Choice Awards, which will move to the network from CBS in 2018 with a new November scheduling. The network promoted that the show would be given an "end-to-end" experience that will leverage its existing experience in awards show coverage. As ratings declined across all of cable television overall, the People's Choice returned to broadcast television in 2021, with E! simulcasting the ceremony with NBC.

The network also produces many documentary and biographical series, most notably E! True Hollywood Story; many of E!'s original specials are entertainment-related ranging from light fare (such as 25 Cutest Child Stars All Grown Up) to serious fare (such as 15 Most Unforgettable Hollywood Tragedies). It also produces specials centering on investigative and crime stories including E! Investigates, which features topical investigative reports on subjects ranging from child prostitution to teenage pregnancy.

In recent years, the network has become known for its reality television programs. Its most popular series for over a decade has been Keeping Up with the Kardashians, which spawned eight spin-off series and countless specials. Other original reality programming airing on the network currently includes Total Divas–a series featuring the WWE's Bella Twins, Hollywood Medium with Tyler Henry, the plastic surgery repair series Dr. 90210 and Botched, along with Very Cavallari with Kristin Cavallari and her (later ex-) husband Jay Cutler, Ladygang–a television version of the popular podcast, and dating show Dating #NoFilter,

E! has had five comedy programs: the late night talk show Chelsea Lately, hosted by comedian Chelsea Handler, its scripted/improvised spin-off After Lately, and The Soup (based on the popular 1991–2002 E! series Talk Soup), featuring clips of the previous week's TV shows with humorous commentary delivered by the host, actor/comedian Joel McHale. Handler also produced Love You, Mean It, a weekly comedic look at pop culture hosted by Whitney Cummings, and a nightly talk show from actress Busy Philipps, Busy Tonight. The Soup returned in February 2020, with new host Jade Catta-Preta, though it, and many of E!'s in-studio shows, were cancelled in the last quarter of 2020 due to the effects of the COVID-19 pandemic hampering production.

On September 8, 2020, it was announced the network's most popular series Keeping Up with the Kardashians would be ending with season 20 in 2021.

=== Acquired series and films ===
Over the years, E! has occasionally run acquired programming including reruns of Alice, Absolutely Fabulous, 20/20 lifestyle-based interview shows from ABC (since removed under NBCUniversal ownership), and edited 60-minute versions of Saturday Night Live, though fewer of these programs currently air. The only programming currently airing on E! that it does not produce are broadcast standards-edited reruns of the former HBO series Sex and the City originally carried by HBO's sister network TBS, and feature films that air under the banner "Movies We Love"; the latter was part of a since-abandoned initiative by the network to use films to increase the network's ratings, though the branding remains. The network has aired same-week runs of NBC series (such as The Voice, Fashion Star, Whitney, and Are You There, Chelsea?), and in the past aired previews of G4 programming to give that network an extended promotional platform due to their lowered carriage when it was removed from DirecTV in November 2010. The network also airs selected shows from the Peacock streaming service (which E!'s parent company NBCUniversal owns).

=== Sports programming ===
Since Comcast's acquisition of NBC Universal, E! infrequently aired sporting events as an overflow outlet for NBC Sports. It has participated in NBC's "Championship Sunday" effort to broadcast all matches on the final matchday of the Premier League soccer season. In January 2022—following the shutdown of long-time sister channel NBCSN—E! was incorporated into NBC Sports' coverage of two figure skating events ahead of the 2022 Winter Olympics, the 2022 European Figure Skating Championships and Four Continents Figure Skating Championships. E! would be involved in NBC's coverage of the 2024 Summer Olympics.

== E! HD ==
E! HD is a high definition simulcast feed of E! launched on December 8, 2008, in Comcast's default 1080i resolution format. Currently, the network's entire original programming roster post-2010 is carried in high definition, along with most films. Available on the vast majority of pay television providers, it is downscaled at the provider headend level to provide a standard definition equivalent for those systems.

During E!'s run as a broadcast service in Canada, the E! Ontario version of the service until the December 2008 discontinuation of the E! broadcast television system was available in HD over Hamilton, Ontario-based CHCH-TV (channel 11) on its channel 18 ATSC digital signal, though the majority of E!'s programming outside American primetime series before the shutdown of the television system was not available in the format.

== E! Online ==
E! Online is the online arm of E!, featuring live updates on entertainment news stories; the website includes an online-only entertainment news bulletin titled E! News Now, which is updated each weekday. The website also provides live streaming video of major red carpet events including movie premieres and award shows such as the Academy Awards and the Emmys, along with some blogs involving shows such as The Soup. Columnists featured on the website include Kristin dos Santos (the "Watch with Kristin" television blog), Ted Casablanca ("The Awful Truth" gossip blog), and Marc Malkin (writer of an eponymous gossip blog and host of a daily video blog on the site). The website was ranked among the best of 1998 by Entertainment Weekly.

As part of the rebrand of the cable channel on July 9, 2012, EOnline.com was redesigned for HTML5, including tablet and mobile devices.

== International versions ==
=== Australia and New Zealand ===
The Australia and New Zealand version of E1 was available for the first time in 2002. In 2023, E!'s content was folded into the new 7Bravo channel.

=== Canada ===
The Canadian channel Star! was rebranded as E! in 2010.

=== Europe ===
The European E! channel was launched in 2002.

=== Asia ===
E!'s Asian network aired across Southeast Asia and the Philippines from May 3, 1995, until December 31, 2019.

==== Philippines ====
Some of E! programs started to air on Cinema Television during its inception by RMN (thru UHF Channel 31; now acquired by BEAM). But in 2000, both RMN and E! announced its partnership to relaunch CTV into E! Philippines. It was originally broadcast 24 hours a day, but eventually reduced in 2001 to a primetime 6-midnight block, before ending in 2003. Some of E!'s programs were brought to the Philippines and remade in a local version, one of which was Wild On! Philippines.

Three years after the relaunch as a standalone cable channel, E! produced its first original reality series in Asia, It Takes Gutz to Be A Gutierrez starring the Gutierrez family.

==== Israel ====
E! is broadcast in Israel by cable provider HOT and by satellite provider yes.

==== Latin America ====
E! it is distributed in Latin America, since January 1, 1997, being operated by NBCUniversal International Networks and distributed by Ole Distribution (a joint venture between Warner Bros. Discovery and Ole Communications). Its operations center is located in Caracas, Bogotá and Mexico City.
