= Precious Find =

- Directed by: Philippe Mora
- Produced by: Brian Rix; Jane Ubell; John Remark
- Starring: Rutger Hauer; Joan Chen; Harold Pruett; Brion James
- Music by: Roy Hay
- Production company: Initial Entertainment Group
- Distributed by: Republic Pictures (North America); Initial Entertainment Group (Overseas)
- Release date: 1996
- Running time: 90 mins.
- Country: United States
- Language: English

Precious Find (also known as Space Defender) is a 1996 science fiction action film directed by Philippe Mora and starring Rutger Hauer. The film is set on the Moon, in 2049.

== Plot ==
In the future, at Moon City, fate brings three adventurers together: a space ship owner, a young prospector, and a shady entrepreneur who are looking for gold on an asteroid. There they find a mine. After the prospector returns to Moon City to get water, he is followed by two soldiers of fortune, a man and a woman. The two join the three adventures.

Frictions occur because the gold rush gives the entrepreneur a bad temper, the prospector and the woman get romantically involved, a monster attacks, and bandits visit the place. The movie ends with the death of the bandits and the entrepreneur, and the space ship owner, the prospector, and the woman going for new adventures searching for gold.

== Cast ==
- Rutger Hauer as Armond Crille
- Joan Chen as Camilla Jones
- Harold Pruett as Ben Rutherford
