= The Legend of Gator Face =

- Directed by: Vic Sarin
- Written by: David Covell; Alan Mruvka; Sahara Riley
- Produced by: Alan Mruvka; Marilyn Vance; Patrick Whitley
- Starring: John White; Dan Warry-Smith; Charlotte Sullivan
- Cinematography: John P. Tarver
- Edited by: Dave Goard
- Music by: Joseph Williams
- Distributed by: Hallmark Entertainment
- Release date: May 19, 1996
- Running time: 99 minutes
- Country: Canada
- Language: English

The Legend of Gator Face is a 1996 Canadian comedy horror feature film written by David Covell, Alan Mruvka, and Sahara Riley, and directed by Vic Sarin. The film first aired as a Showtime Original Pictures for Kids in May 1996. In 1997 it was nominated for a Daytime Emmy. The Legend of Gator Face had a theatrical and television release and is now available on DVD.

== Plot ==
Two friends, Danny (John White), and Phil (Dan Warry-Smith) live in a Mississippi town near a swamp. There is a local legend of a swamp-dwelling creature called "Gator Face". They construct a Gator Face costume by modifying a wetsuit. After scaring most of the townsfolk, their pranks make national news, drawing the attention of the National Guard.

Danny soon discovers that Gator Face is real and friendly. After Danny, along with his friends Phil and Angel (Charlotte Sullivan), saves Gator Face from a trap, they realize that Gator Face is protecting the swamps. Danny learns that the National Guard will kill Gator Face if he is caught, so the three friends resolve to save the monster.

Danny's older brother Chip (Gordon Michael Woolvett) shoots at Danny (while Danny is dressed as Gator Face) with a flare gun and misses when Danny flees into a nearby building. The townsfolk think Danny is the real Gator Face and burns the building with Danny in it, the real Gator Face jumps in and saves Danny but is himself shot. Yet the swamp won't let its defender die, so the fog heals Gator Face and the day is saved.

== Cast ==
- John White as Danny
- Dan Warry-Smith as Phil
- Charlotte Sullivan as Angel
- Gordon Michael Woolvett as Chip
- C. David Johnson as Sheriff
- Paul Winfield as Bob
- Pam Hyatt as Mayor's Wife
- Jack Newman as Porkbelly
- Gerry Quigley as Deputy Dan
- Scott Wickware as Reese
- Roger Dunn as Mayor
- Kathleen Laskey as Danny's Mom
- Sam Malkin as Lydster
- Richard McMillan as Skeeter
- Matt John Evans as Gator Face

== Reception ==
TV Guide wrote that the film was a "blatant rip-off" of E.T., but was "a surprisingly effective children's movie nevertheless." They wrote that the story had the usual cliche lessons for children toward teaching tolerance, but that it was not "too preachy or heavy-handed" and that "the emphasis is on lighthearted adventure from a child's point-of-view". They noted that the film was a bit lengthy, but that "the direction is competent and the cast is likable". John J. O'Connor of The New York Times noted that Showtime "strengthened its first-rate record" of providing "innovative, commercial-free family product at dependable times" by its release of The Legend of Gator Face.

== Recognition ==
In 1997 The Legend of Gator Face was nominated for a Daytime Emmy Award for Paul Winfield for Outstanding Performer in a Children's Special.

== Release ==
- Alec to the Rescue, Wild Horses, The Legend of Gatorface, Russkies (4 Disc set) (Jun 7, 2005 Platinum Disc)
- Legend of Gatorface, Russkies (2 Disc set)(Jun 7, 2005 Platinum Disc)
- Legend of Gatorface (Feb 8, 2005 Platinum Disc)
