= Unknown Sender =

US television program

- Genre: Drama; Fantasy; Science fiction
- Created by: Steven E. de Souza
- Directed by: Steven E. de Souza
- Starring: Timothy Dalton; Joanne Whalley; Mindy Sterling; Jay Davis; Stan Freberg
- Composer: Adam Cohen
- Country of origin: United States
- Original language: English
- No. of seasons: 2
- No. of episodes: 9

Production
- Executive producer: Steven E. de Souza
- Producers: Amy De Souza; Daniel De Souza; Kevin Rubio; Gregg Vance; Marilyn Vance
- Production location: Los Angeles
- Running time: 5–10 minutes
- Production company: Valdoro Entertainment

Original release
- Network: Strike.TV, Metacafe
- Release: August 2008

Unknown Sender is an internet television series created in the United States, which debuted in August 2008 on Strike.TV, a website created by Hollywood writers during the 2007–2008 Writers Guild of America strike; the series was later uploaded to YouTube. Like the other Strike.TV offerings which were sanctioned by the writers' sister union, the Screen Actors Guild, Unknown Sender was able to attract major talent to its cast, all of whom agreed to donate profits to the Hollywood charity, Actors' Fund. Among the actors in the series are Timothy Dalton, Joanne Whalley, Mindy Sterling (Austin Powers' "Frau Farbissina"), comedian Jay Davis (Dane Cook's Tourgasm), and Stan Freberg.

Behind the camera, noteworthy figures include Academy Award nominee Marilyn Vance and pioneer web filmmaker Kevin Rubio (Troops) among the producers; as well as Lost Director of Photography Edward J. Pei, film composer Adam Cohen (The Incredibles); and Special Effects Supervisor Shant Jordan (Hellboy II).

== Series premise ==
The five- to ten-minute-long episodes consist of suspense or sci-fi stories which share the conceit of being actual events captured by closed-circuit television, surveillance monitors, amateur videographers, and the like, all collected and posted on the web by a mysterious, unseen "unknown sender".

== Influences ==
The creator of the show, Die Hard screenwriter Steven E. de Souza, described the series as "a cross between the Twilight Zone and Alfred Hitchcock Presents". De Souza, a writer and director on HBO's similarly themed Tales From the Crypt, said another influence was the legendary 1947–1949 Mutual (and later, ABC) network radio horror series, Quiet, Please. Considered by many to be the best example of Golden Age radio, and a direct precursor of the Twilight Zone, Quiet, Please often dramatized its episodes as if the members of the listening audience were themselves participants or inadvertent observers, eavesdropping on the story’s action.

The first episode includes an acknowledgement the Quiet, Please connection via its opening music, Symphony in D minor by César Franck, the same piece used as the theme for every episode of Quiet, Please.

== Critical reception ==
Unknown Sender has been well received by the public and the press alike, having garnered positive reviews from such outlets as TV Guide, The McClatchy Company, and tilzy.tv. USA Today in particular hailed the series's "clever premise".

== Episode list ==
1.1. "If You’re Seeing This Tape…" – A philanthropist engaged in a bitter divorce prepares a video will. Stars Timothy Dalton, Joanne Whalley, and Stan Freberg as "Mostly Mozart" DJ. Tagline: "Where there’s a will, there’s a widow." Aired 28 October 2008.

1.2. "Beta Test" – An overworked and underpaid American IT engineer discovers he is being cheated by a European cartel. Stars Xander Cardinale, Viola Sator, Molly Kohler-Pei, and Michael Butler Murray, with Brian Rodda and Drea Hoffman. Tagline: “It’s not a bug, it’s a feature.” Aired 7 November 2008.

1.3. "Slippery Slope" – Two sexy actresses appearing in "Hardwood Pictures'" latest production have a hidden agenda. Stars Ashley Shultz and Amy Main. Tagline: "She’s the man, baby." Aired 11 November 2008.

1.4. "Return Engagement" – A retired Las Vegas performer must pull out every trick in his repertoire to foil home invaders. Stars Stan Freberg, with Holly Kaplan and Geoff Meed. Tagline: "His act always killed." Aired 21 November 2008.

1.5. "Sorry, Wrong Website" – An assassin posing as a hotel employee receives his instructions from a mysterious website. Stars Michael Shunnarah. Tagline: "It's 'i' before 'e' except after 'c'." Aired 12 December 2008.

1.6. "Spin Cycle" – A tenant in her building's laundry room suspects a stranger is waiting for something more sinister than the dryer. Stars Mindy Sterling and Jay Davis. Tagline: "Blood is the nastiest stain." Aired 19 December 2008.

2.1 "The Story of Dope" – Thought lost for almost 40 years, the legendary 1972 Pot Growers of America Convention Reel finally surfaces. Stars Mike Renshaw and Sandy Zeitler with M.D. Clausner as the narrator.

2.2 "Car Alarmed" – The latest development in automobile security – no batteries, wires, or Mirandizing required. Stars Daniel H.

2.3 "Red Light Lisa" – When a client of a cybersex site makes a very special request, the Happy Ending is anything but. Stars Reid Cox, Sonja Fisher, and Patrick O'Bell.
