= The Outsiders (American TV series) =

1990 American television series

- Genre: Teen drama
- Based on: Characters from The Outsiders by S. E. Hinton
- Developed by: S. E. Hinton; Joe Byrne; Jeb Rosebrook
- Starring: Jay R. Ferguson; Rodney Harvey; Boyd Kestner; David Arquette; Robert Rusler; Harold Pruett
- Composers: Jay Gruska; W. G. Snuffy Walden
- Country of origin: United States
- Original language: English
- No. of seasons: 1
- No. of episodes: 13

Production
- Executive producers: Francis Ford Coppola; Fred Roos
- Producers: R.J. Louis; Douglas Steinberg
- Editors: Corky Ehlers; Briana London; Lary Moten; John Neal; John Randle
- Running time: 60 minutes
- Production companies: Zoetrope Studios; Papazian-Hirsch Entertainment

Original release
- Network: Fox
- Release: March 25 – July 22, 1990

Related
- The Outsiders

The Outsiders is an American drama television series that was produced by Zoetrope Studios and Papazian-Hirsch Entertainment and aired from March 25 to July 22, 1990 on Fox. Based on the characters from the 1967 novel of the same title by S. E. Hinton, the series' executive producer was the 1983 film's director Francis Ford Coppola.

== Production ==
The 90-minute pilot episode directed by Alan Shapiro and Sharron Miller served as a sequel to the film and began with a short scene from the original film of Dallas Winston (Matt Dillon) running from police and being shot.

Alan Shapiro wrote and directed the pilot, which was aired as a special preview on March 25, 1990 (seven years after the release of the film) at 9:30 p.m. while the rest of the series aired at 7:00 p.m. The pilot was Fox's highest rated drama in the network's history, drawing a 9.3/16 national Nielsen rating and 14.1 million viewers, and tied for 64th for the week. However, The Outsiders lost half the viewers from its Married... with Children lead-in.

== Cast ==
- Jay R. Ferguson as Ponyboy Curtis
- Rodney Harvey as Sodapop Curtis
- Boyd Kestner as Darrel "Darry" Curtis
- Harold Pruett as Steve Randle
- David Arquette as Keith "Two-Bit" Matthews
- Robert Rusler as Tim Shepherd
- Kim Walker as Sherri "Cherry" Valance
- Heather McComb as Belinda "Scout" Jenkins
- Sean Kanan as Gregg Parker
- Scott Coffey as Randy Anderson
- Billy Bob Thornton as Buck Merrill
- Jennifer McComb as Marcia
- Leonardo DiCaprio as Boy fighting Scout

== Episodes ==
No.	Title	Directed by	Written by	Original release date
1	"Pilot"	Sharron Miller and Alan Shapiro	Alan Shapiro	March 25, 1990
In the series pilot, a welfare worker (L. Scott Caldwell) warns the three orphaned Curtis brothers that any trouble will send Ponyboy and Sodapop to foster homes.
2	"The Stork Club"	Jan Eliasberg	Bruce Kirschbaum	April 1, 1990
Soda wants to keep it from Darry that he's gotten a girl pregnant; and Ponyboy becomes "protective" when Scout is courted by a non-greaser.
3	"Only the Lonely"	Bill Duke	Story by : Deborah Arakelian; Teleplay by : Frederick Rappaport & Douglas Steinberg	April 8, 1990
Tim Shepard returns from prison and is tempted to take a job offer from two men he met in the joint. Though, while he hangs out with the Curtis brothers, he alienates Soda from Darry.
4	"Breaking the Maiden"	Janet Greek	Jeb Rosebrook & Joe Byrne	April 15, 1990
Ponyboy regrets not taking Cherry's bait to tackle the school dance, until he's hooked by a stronger line; the North side Greaser Band makes its pro debut.
5	"He Was a Greaser, Only Old"	Lee H. Katzin	Robert Harders	April 22, 1990
A chain-gang fugitive (Ed O'Ross) is "one of us" to Ponyboy, so he tries to help him by giving him food and clothes. Though, by doing this, the man alienates Ponyboy from Darry. Then, when Ponyboy asks for Soda's help to give the man a few things, the man shoots Soda in the shoulder, making the cops and Darry think Tim did it.
6	"Maybe Baby"	Bill Molloy	Tammy Ader	April 29, 1990
The Curtis' overnight care of an infant whose father doesn't return puts them through some changes and prompts Two-Bit to get in touch with his estranged father.
7	"Storm Warning"	Gwen Arner	Joel M. Wilf	May 6, 1990
As a tornado approaches, Darry tries to save the roof on a customer's house, Ponyboy attempts to move an injured Soc to safety, and Soda risks Darrel's cash to save Buck's poker stake.
8	"Mirror Image"	Bill Duke	Frederick Rappaport & Douglas Steinberg	May 13, 1990
A girl Soda has been dating dumps him for a black student. Angered by this, Soda challenges the boy to a fight which he loses and the Socs end up ganging up on the student until he has to go to the hospital. Everyone blames Soda, thus making him blame himself, and turn himself in to the police. The Socs then get angry and try to gang up on Soda when he is working late, alone.
9	"Carnival"	Bill Molloy	Todd Robinson	May 27, 1990
At a carnival, Darry and Tim fight one scam while Soda is caught in another when a seductive carny girl (Viveka Davis) separates him from the car he's "borrowed" for the evening.
10	"Tequila Sunset"	Janet Greek	Marc Thyme	June 10, 1990
Needing to pay off gambling debts, Two-Bit tries to get his school's hoop star (Geoffrey Infeld) to commit a foul; Tim goes to church to see the gal (Lezlie Deane) who got away.
11	"Winner Takes All"	Robert Becker	James Kearns	June 24, 1990
Darry's dream requires a loan, but Soda's dream comes true, thanks to a prank by Steve and Two-Bit, that sends Soda into a spending spree.
12	"The Beat Goes On"	Michael Uno	David Abramowitz	July 15, 1990
Darry objects when Scout uses the Curtis's for refuge from an abusive father, but doesn't mind his own time spent with a lonely military wife.
13	"Union Blues"	Bill Duke	Ira Steven Behr	July 22, 1990
A desperate Darry joins a group of laborers, unaware he's crossing a picket line formed by Tim's union; Ponyboy sees the good life as he tutors a track star.
