= Forsman & Bodenfors =

Swedish advertising agency

- Company type: Advertising agency
- Founded: 1986 in Gothenburg, Sweden
- Number of locations: A total of 8 locations: New York, Toronto, Dublin, London, Stockholm, Gothenburg, Shanghai and Singapore.
- Key people: James Denton-Clark, Global CEO, Eric Zuncic, Global Managing Director & Chief Product Officer, Justine Armour , Global CCO
- Services: Advertising
- Number of employees: 350+
- Website: forsman.com

Forsman & Bodenfors is a global, creative collective founded in Gothenburg, Sweden in 1986.

== Acquisition ==
In June 2016, the company was acquired by MDC Partners. The deal involved an initial payment of $32.3 million in MDC shares. This was the first acquisition by MDC's new CEO, Scott Kauffman. When asked to comment on the deal, F&B's former CEO, Erik Sollenberg “We needed a partner to expand our business,” and that “the ad world is becoming more and more global.”

== Merger ==
In September 2018, MDC Partners-owned agencies Kirshenbaum Bond Senecal + Partners (KBS) and Forsman & Bodenfors merged to form a new global creative offering under the latter's name, effectively putting an end to the KBS acronym. In 2020, The Stagwell Group announced plans to merge with its affiliate MDC Partners. The merger was completed in August 2021 and the marketing and communications group went on to become Stagwell Inc.

In October 2024, Forsman & Bodenfors has appointed James Denton-Clark as its new global CEO, succeeding the agency's co-founder, who will transition to a strategic advisory role.

In January 2025, Justine Armour was named Global Chief Creative Officer.

== Clients ==
Forsman & Bodenfors is now part of the marketing and communications group Stagwell Inc. Clients include Volvo, P&G, Diageo, LG, Jaeger-LeCoultre, Allianz, Therabody, Oatly and Burger King, among others.
