= Strike.TV =

Strike.TV was created during the 2007-08 Writers Guild of America (WGA) strike as consortium of more than 40 online shows by Hollywood guild members, and later uploaded to YouTube.

"Strike TV is overseen by its creator, Peter Hyoguchi who got the idea off the ground during the WGA's 100-day walkout with the help of its association with United Hollywood, the scribe-run blog that became an influential force in rallying and disseminating info to scribes during the strike."

The website was first archived 7 September 2008. Its launch on October 28, 2008, featured several shows of various genres:

"The purpose of the site is to generate revenue for out-of-work colleagues. Strike.tv has pledged to donate the first three months of ad revenue to the Entertainment Assistance Program of the Actors Fund. The site is also intended to generate revenue for the writers as they will own the intellectual property they create."

== Web series ==
- "Anyone But Me": written and directed by Tina Cesa Ward and Susan Miller
- "5 or Die": written and directed by Tom Holland ("Childs Play")
- "The Challenge": written by Lloyd Garver ("Newhart")
- "Confessional": written by Ken LaZebnik ("Prairie Home Companion")
- "Dangerous Women (web series)": written by David O'Malley ("Fatal Instinct")
- "Daryl from OnCar": Ron Corcillo ("Malcolm in the Middle") and Russ Carney
- "Faux Baby": directed by Charlie Stratton written by Laura Brennan , Jennifer Maisel, Rachel Leventhal
- "Global Warming": written by Rob Kutner ("The Daily Show"), Sheryl Zorn ("Penn & Teller: Bullshit!") and directed by Mike Shapiro.
- "Greenville General": written by Karen Harris ("General Hospital")
- "House Poor": written by Mindy Kaling & Lester Lewis ("The Office")
- "Joe & Kate": written by and starring Joe Kelly ("How I Met Your Mother") and Kate Purdy ("Cold Case")
- "John's Hand": written by Catherine Butterfield ("Ghost Whisperer")
- "Life in General": written by Karen Harris ("General Hospital")
- "Lose Yourself"
- "Me First": written by Peter Hyoguchi, Krista Tucker
- "Side Effects": written by Chuck Rose
- "Sketch Toons": written by Charles Horn ("Robot Chicken")
- "Speedie Date": written by Lorin Wertheimer ("Girlfriends")
- "The Smartest Guy in the World": written by Rick Rosner ("Jimmy Kimmel Live!")
- "Tender Morsels": written by Giuseppe Graziano ("The King of Queens")
- "Unknown Sender": written and directed by Steven E. de Souza ("Die Hard")
- "With the Angels": written by Mary Feuer ("lonelygirl15")
- "Katana (web series)": written by Yuji Okumoto and Richard Cranor

The first three months' of profits will be contributed to the Actors' Fund Entertainment Assistance Program, that offers financial relief and other services to entertainment industry professionals negatively impacted by the strike.
