= Kudditji Kngwarreye =

Australian Aboriginal artist (1938 – 2017)

- Born: 1938; Lallguora, Utopia, Northern Territories, Australia
- Died: 23 January 2017 (aged 78–79); Alice Springs, Northern Territory, Australia
- Other names: Goob, " Rothko of The Bush "
- Known for: Painting, contemporary indigenous Australian art

Kudditji Kngwarreye, also known as "Goob", (1938 – 23 January 2017) was an Australian Aboriginal artist from the Utopia community in the Northern Territory. He was the brother through kinship of the late Emily Kame Kngwarreye. Like his skin sister Emily, he was one of the most prominent and successful artists in the history of contemporary indigenous Australian art.

== Life ==
Kngwarreye was born and lived in the Anmatyerre language group at Alhalkere in the Utopia community, located 250 kilometres (160 mi) north-east of Alice Springs. Kngwarreye had a traditional bush upbringing and worked as a stockman and mine worker. He was also a traditional custodian of many important Dreamings of the land, and men's business ceremonial sites located in his country at Utopia Station.

Kngwarreye witnessed the success of Albert Namatjira, and experienced the 1967 referendum. Kngwarreye and his countrymen had their land claim approved in 1979 and throughout the years he felt the effects of different government policies on Indigenous people of the Northern Territory. Kngwarreye started painting around 1986 and continued painting until 2015. He participated in many international exhibitions and became known for depictions of his Dreamings; their abstract imagery, bold colour use, and intuitive interplay with space and form has cemented his name in the Aboriginal art scene.

Over the years, the Anmatyerre elder's Dreamings evolved into juxtaposed colour fields in both composition and hue. Harsh or soft, his style mapped out the creation, his country, and his traditional Dreamings.

In 2006, he was named one of the top 50 most collectible artists in Australia by Art Collector magazine.

In 2013, Kate Owen Gallery presented the exhibition "The Master Returns" – a long-awaited new body of work by Kudditji and his first since overcoming a difficult battle with illness. Gallery owner and director Geoff Henderson commented at the time, "Quite simply, this is the most powerful and compelling body of works I’ve seen from him". Kngwarreye continued to paint until 2015 when illness prevented him from painting any longer. Two years later, in January 2017, he died peacefully in a retirement home in Alice Springs.

== Art style ==
Acrylic paintings were introduced to Utopia in 1988/89 by Rodney Gooch and others of the Central Australian Aboriginal Media Association (CAAMA). An exhibition of some of these artists' work, organised by CAAMA, called "A Summer Project", where Kngwarreye's work received immediate attention from critics. The Summer Project, Emily's national launch exhibition, featuring her debut canvas work Emu Woman.

The predominant Aboriginal style, developed with assistance from art teacher Geoffrey Bardon at the Papunya community in 1971, featured many similarly sized dots carefully lying next to each other in distinct patterns. Instead, members of the Utopia community were encouraged by Mike Mitchell of Muk Muk Fine Art (now Mitchell Fine Art). After workshopping and trialing, the quintessential Kngwarreye brushwork emerged, which Kngwarreye further refined to create his own original artistic style.

Like many of the desert artists, he mastered the use of acrylic paint on canvas. His use of colour combined with simple shapes tell the stories of one of his inherited ancestral totems - the Emu Ancestors, their travels and teachings depicting various interpretations of the Emu Dreaming sites and ceremonies associated with men's business.

Initially, the highly intuitive and gestural painting method for which he became known was not welcomed by galleries. Instead, he was encouraged to paint in the fashionable style of the time, executing works with overt iconography, figurative elements and detailed infill. However, after witnessing the success of Utopian artist Emily Kame Kngwarreye, who catapulted onto the Australian and International Art scene using a technique similar to his, Kngwarreye resumed his exploration of the abstract.

From early 2003, Kngwarreye began to experiment with paint to eradicate the pointillist style altogether and use a heavily loaded paint brush to sweep broadly across the canvas in stages, similar to the western landscape plane. These paintings were romantic images of his country, accentuating the colour and form of the landscape, including the depth of the sky in the raining season and in the summer heat.

While the early body of this work was admired by a few, it was not well received at the time. Today, Kngwarreye's works have a national and international following. He has been represented in major exhibitions and has gained worldwide recognition for his traditional depictions of his dreamings.

For international collectors of contemporary art, Kngwarreye quickly became an obvious addition. Collectors saw mastery in his technique and appreciated his floating fields of luminous colour. Whilst many international visitors compared him to the great American abstract impressionist, Mark Rothko, Kngwarreye was totally unaware of any similarities. He was just painting his country, his Dreamings, his way.

== Emu dreaming ==
During his younger days, Kngwarreye held the responsibility of an elder, and frequently took young men hunting emu across his ancestral lands, merging tradition with practice as part of their initiation as men.

While painting, Kngwarreye could be heard singing. On one level it was a way of infusing his works with stories of the land; the ancestors, hunts, travels and the food and water of Anmatyerre country. On other levels, the act of painting reminded him of home and his singing was his way of maintaining his bond with his country, far away from Alice Springs. He painted the country he longed to see again, and, at least in that moment of singing and painting, he returned to his country, if only in his heart and mind.

Kngwarreye held the responsibility of an elder, and frequently took the young boys/men hunting emu across his ancestral lands, merging tradition with practice as part of their initiation as men.

== Collections ==
- Araluen Arts Centre, Alice Springs
- Hank Ebes Collection, Melbourne
- Macquarie University, Sydney
- University of New South Wales, Sydney
- Guilleman and Sordello Collection, France
- R. M. Barokh Antiques, California
- Mbantua Gallery Permanent Collection Alice Springs

== Exhibitions ==
Solo:

- 2016: Singing Up Country | Kudditji Kngwarreye, Kate Owen Gallery, Sydney
- 2016: Kudditji Kngwarreye - A master painter there is only one of him, Mandel Aboriginal Art Gallery, Melbourne
- 2014: Kudditji Kngwarreye, Japingka Gallery, Perth
- 2014: Earth + Sky, Fireworks Gallery, Brisbane
- 2013: Kudditji: Landscapes in the Family Tradition, Booker-Lowe Gallery, Houston, Texas USA
- 2013: Colours of Dreaming | Kudditji Kngwarreye, Mitchell Fine Art, Brisbane
- 2013: The Master Returns, Kate Owen Gallery, Sydney
- 2011: Kudditji Kngwarreye, Kate Owen Gallery, Sydney
- 2011: COLOURFIELD: new paintings, Fireworks gallery, Brisbane
- 2010: Kudditji Kngwarreye, Kate Owen Gallery, Sydney
- 2010: Kudditji Kngwarreye, Palya Proper Fine Arts Alice Springs
- 2009: Kudditji Kngwarreye: Pastels, Kate Owen Gallery, Sydney
- 2008: My Country, Kudditji Kngwarreye, Central Art Aboriginal Store, Alice Springs
- 2008: 30 Emu Dreamings, Kate Owen Gallery, Sydney
- 2008: My Country, Japingka Gallery, Perth
- 2006: Masterwork, Vivien Anderson Gallery, Melbourne
- 2006: My Country, Japingka Gallery, Perth
- 2006: Two Fields, Fireworks Gallery, Brisbane
- 2005: Waterhole Aboriginal Art, Danks Street, Sydney
- 2005: New Paintings, Vivien Anderson Gallery, Melbourne
- 2005: Colours in Country, Art Mob, Hobart, Tasmania
- 2004: My Country, New Paintings, Vivien Anderson Gallery, Melbourne
- 2004: My Country, Japingka Gallery, Perth
- 2004: Waterhole Aboriginal Art, Sofitel Wentworth Hotel Exhibition, Sydney
- 2003: New Paintings, Vivien Anderson Gallery, Melbourne
- 1999: New Paintings, Chapel off Chapel, Melbourne

Group:

- 2016: Spoilt for Choice - a director's choice exhibition, Kate Gwen Gallery, Sydney
- 2015: Signs and Traces - Contemporary Aboriginal Art, Cultural Institute Zamek, Pozan, Poland
- 2015: From the Vaults - highlights from the Collectors' Gallery, Kate Owen Gallery, Sydney
- 2014: Vast Interiors, Kate Owen Gallery, Sydney
- 2012: The Colourists: Kudditji Kngwarreye and Lorna Napurrula Fencer, Japingka Gallery, perth
- 2013: Sky and Desert, Foundation Burkhardt-Felder Arts et Culture, Switzerland
- 2010: Utopia: Eastern Anmatyerre Artists, Neo Gallery, Brisbane
- 2009: Aboriginal Art, Mary Place Gallery, Sydney
- 2009: Reves Aborigines, Musee Arts et Histoire de Bormes-Les-Mimosas, Bormes-Les-Mimosas, France
- 2008: From the Air, Fireworks Gallery, Brisbane
- 2008: Black & White: Inspired by Landscape, Kate Owen Gallery, Sydney
- 2006: New Paintings, Vivien Anderson Gallery, Melbourne
- 2005: Big Country, Gallery Gondwana, Alice Springs
- 2005: Fresh from the Central Desert, Canberra Grammar School, Canberra
- 2004: Two Senior Men, Art Mob Gallery, Tasmania
- 2004: Australian Exhibition Centre, Chicago
- 2004: Heartbeat - Living Country, Wenthworth Hotel, Sydney
- 2004: Spirit of Colour, Depot Gallery, Sydney
- 2002: The Contemporaries, Contemporary Artspace, Brisbane
- 2000: Mia Mia, Aboriginal Art gallery, Melbourne
- 1999: Chapel Off, Chapel gallery, Melbourne
- 1992: Tjukurrpa, Museum fur Volkerkunde, Basel, Switzerland
- 1991: Central Australian Aboriginal Art & Craft Exhibition, Araluen Centre, Alice Springs
- 1990: Art Dock, Contemporary Art from Australia, Nouméa, New Caledonia

== Influence ==
Artists around the world were inspired by the work of Kudditji Kngwarreye, including Melbourne-based painter Vincent Fantauzzo (a four-time Archibald People's Choice Award winner). Vincent's 2016 exhibition "Last Contact" at Nanda Hobbs Gallery showcased five triptychs; each containing a portrait of a great Central Australian artist, together with a painting by the Indigenous artist and a landscape by Fantuazzo. His great affection and respect for Kudditji is undeniable: "He kind of looks like a character from Lord of the Rings but there's nothing fake about him. Everything is genuine and real."

Fantauzzo has commented on the sense of urgency he felt to complete his portrait, when in 2015 Kngwarreye fell ill and there were fears he may not recover. "I get goosebumps thinking about it. That's the time when I realised what he meant to me and what he taught me." Fantuazzo entered his portrait of Kngwarreye in the 2015 Archibald Prize as well as Kngwarreye's artwork in the Wynne Prize. Neither painting was shown in the finalist exhibition.

Another artist to have been positively influenced by Kudditji Kngwarreye is Philip Hunter Lindsay, a Sydney-based landscape and portrait artist and finalist in the Art Gallery of New South Wales 2011 Sir John Sulman Prize. Philip claims to have taken inspiration from Kngwarreye, particularly his early life living as a stockman in the remote parts of central Australia. Philip Hunter Lindsay has painted over a dozen unique, sought after, colorful portraits of Kudditji Kngwarreye over a decade of his admiration for the unique, Australian artist.

== Awards ==
In 2006, Kngwarreye was named as one of the top 50 most collectible artists in Australia by Art Collector magazine.

== See also ==
- Australian art

== General references ==
- Green, Jenny (2007). "Holding the country: art from Utopia and the Sandover". In Hetti Perkins & Margie West (ed.). One Sun One Moon: Aboriginal Art in Australia. Sydney: Art Gallery of New South Wales. ISBN 978-0-7347-6360-0.
- Ryan, Judith (2008). Across the Desert: Aboriginal Batik from Central Australia. Melbourne: National Gallery of Victoria. ISBN 978-0-7241-0299-0.
- "Kudditji Kngwarreye". Indigenous Law Centre. UNSW Sydney. 2010.
- Australian Art Collector magazine, issue 2, October – December 1997
- "Kudditji Kngwarreye". Red Rock Gallery. 2007.
