= Celebrity–industrial complex =

The celebrity–industrial complex is a social and economic construct which involves a symbiotic relationship between celebrities and business corporations. First proposed by Vanity Fair columnist Maureen Orth in her book, The Importance of Being Famous (2003), it is fueled both by the celebrities' seemingly continual search for fame and attention and the business corporations' search for catchy headlines as well as viable name brands that could be sustained by such celebrities.

In the celebrity-industrial complex, the celebrity either has a particular feature that is attractive to a public audience or is a victim of an occurrence that wins sympathy or condemnation from that same audience; this celebrity, for an initial period of time, becomes a subject of media scrutiny or marketing by properly funded media publication distributors. This media scrutiny, however, can often become a source of income for the celebrity, or the media scrutiny becomes an outlet of promotion for future manufactured publications or initiatives by the celebrities, and the media scrutiny around the celebrity expands to include coverage of such products. At the same time, the fans and followers of the celebrity may adopt the celebrity's values, products, and attitudes as a basis for using their following as the basis of an identity.

The term "celebrity-industrial complex" is an homage to the much older term military–industrial complex, which refers to a similar bilateral relationship between national militaries and industrial corporations which profit from each other.

== See also ==
- List of industrial complexes
