= Sullivan & Company =

Brand engagement firm

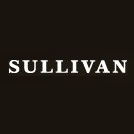
- Company type: Private
- Industry: Advertising, Marketing
- Founded: 1990
- Headquarters: New York, New York, USA
- Key people: Barbara Apple Sullivan; Managing Partner Valentine McGovern; Partner, Chief Financial Officer John Paolini; Partner, Executive Creative Director Nicole Ferry; Partner Nancy Schulman; Partner
- Website: www.sullivannyc.com

Sullivan is an independent, WBENC-certified woman-owned, brand agency located on Madison Avenue in New York City. Founded in 1990 by Barbara Apple Sullivan, Managing Partner, Sullivan provides brand and marketing services in financial services, higher education, professional services, and technology industries.

== Services ==
Sullivan produces integrated marketing, design, and digital experiences with a specialty in technology, financial services, higher education, and professional services.

== Awards ==
- 2025, FCS Portfolio Awards, Bank of America
- 2025, Gramercy Institute, Financial Marketing Strategy Awards, Bank of America
- 2024, Webby Honoree, Osaic, Insight Partners, KKR
- 2023, Webby Honoree, Longfellow Real Estate Partners
- 2022, B2B Elevation, Roll by ADP
- 2022, FCS Portfolio Awards, Roll by ADP
- 2021, ANA Global ACE Award, Insight Partners
- 2020, 9th fastest-growing B2B Agency from B2B Marketing
- 2019, Webby Award Winner, SAG-AFTRA Website
- 2018, The Drum Marketing Awards Finalist, AXA and Teach for America
- 2017, Chief Marketer B2B Top Shops
- 2016, GDUSA American Graphic Design Award, Weill Cornell Medicine Brand Identity
- 2015, Fast Co. Innovation by Design Award Finalist, Cornell Tech
- 2015, Webby “People's Voice Award" Winner, Cornell Tech
- 2015, BMA B2 for "Best Corporate Brand/Identity" Winner, Crown Castle
- 2014, Content Marketing Institute "Agency of the Year" Finalist, Imprint
- 2012-2014, Inc. Magazine "5000 Fastest Growing Companies in America"
- 2012-2014, Gramercy Institute, “20 Rising Stars”
- 2014, Financial Marketing Strategy “Best Global Strategy” Award, Merrill Lynch
- 2013, B2B Magazine, "Who's Who"
- 2012, BtoB Magazine, "Top Small Agency of the Year”

== Notable clients ==
Sullivan manages companies such as:

- AllianceBernstein
- American Express
- American University
- ADP
- BlackRock
- BNY Mellon
- Brown University
- Charles Schwab
- Cognizant
- Cornell Tech
- Crown Castle
- CQ Roll Call
- Duke University
- Everyday Health
- Fidelity Investments
- Human Rights Watch
- Institute for Contemporary Art at VCU
- KKR
- LinkedIn
- Bank of America / Merrill Lynch
- New York University Stern School of Business
- Osaic
- Stony Brook University
- TD Ameritrade
- Weill Cornell Medical College
- Wellington Management
