= Bugaboo International =

Dutch parental products design company

Bugaboo International B.V.
- Company type: Private
- Industry: Parental products
- Founded: 1996; 30 years ago
- Headquarters: Amsterdam, Netherlands
- Key people: Max Barenbrug, designer
- Products: baby transport
- Number of employees: 1,200

Bugaboo International B.V. is a Dutch design company that makes parental products such as pushchairs for infants and toddlers. Its products are available in 50 countries. Bugaboo employs over 1,200 people, working at headquarters in Amsterdam, The Netherlands or in one of the offices in the UK, Germany, Sweden, Italy, Spain, United States, France, Australia, South Korea, Japan, Shanghai China and in the assembly plant in Xiamen, China.

== History ==
Bugaboo was founded in 1996 by Max Barenbrug and his then brother-in-law, Eduard Zanen, an entrepreneur and doctor, following an investment by Zanen. Barenbrug started the concept for Bugaboo as a graduation project two years earlier when he was studying at the Design Academy Eindhoven.

The first Bugaboo, the "Bugaboo Classic", was launched in The Netherlands in 1999. In 2001, the "Bugaboo Frog" was launched in the United Kingdom and in 2002 in the United States, popularized by its appearance in an episode of the TV show Sex and the City.

In February 2018, Bugaboo was acquired by Bain Capital for an undisclosed amount. In 2019, Bugaboo released the Lynx stroller.

== See also ==
- Baby transport

== Notes and references ==
- "Bugaboo Leaps Past Frog". BusinessWeek. Archived from the original on January 12, 2006.
- "Bugaboo International B.V. - Company Overview". BusinessWeek. Archived from the original on March 12, 2008.
- Swords, Tara (2008-05-18). "Talking to the Mom on the Street to See How She Rolls". The Washington Post.
- "Furnishings and Accessories for Infants, Toddlers and Preschoolers Expected to Stroll into $13 Billion by 2012". prnewswire.com/.
- "The Style & Design 100: Bugaboo". Time. 2007-04-13. Archived from the original on April 21, 2007.
- Interview with Max Barenbrug: "5-Minute Time Out: Max Barenbrug". babble.com/.
- "Bugaboo krijgt een kleine". bright.nl/ (in Dutch).
- "De Bugaboo is een product voor ouders, niet voor kinderen". sprout.nl/ (in Dutch). Archived from the original on 2008-06-09.
