= Larry Namer =

American media executive

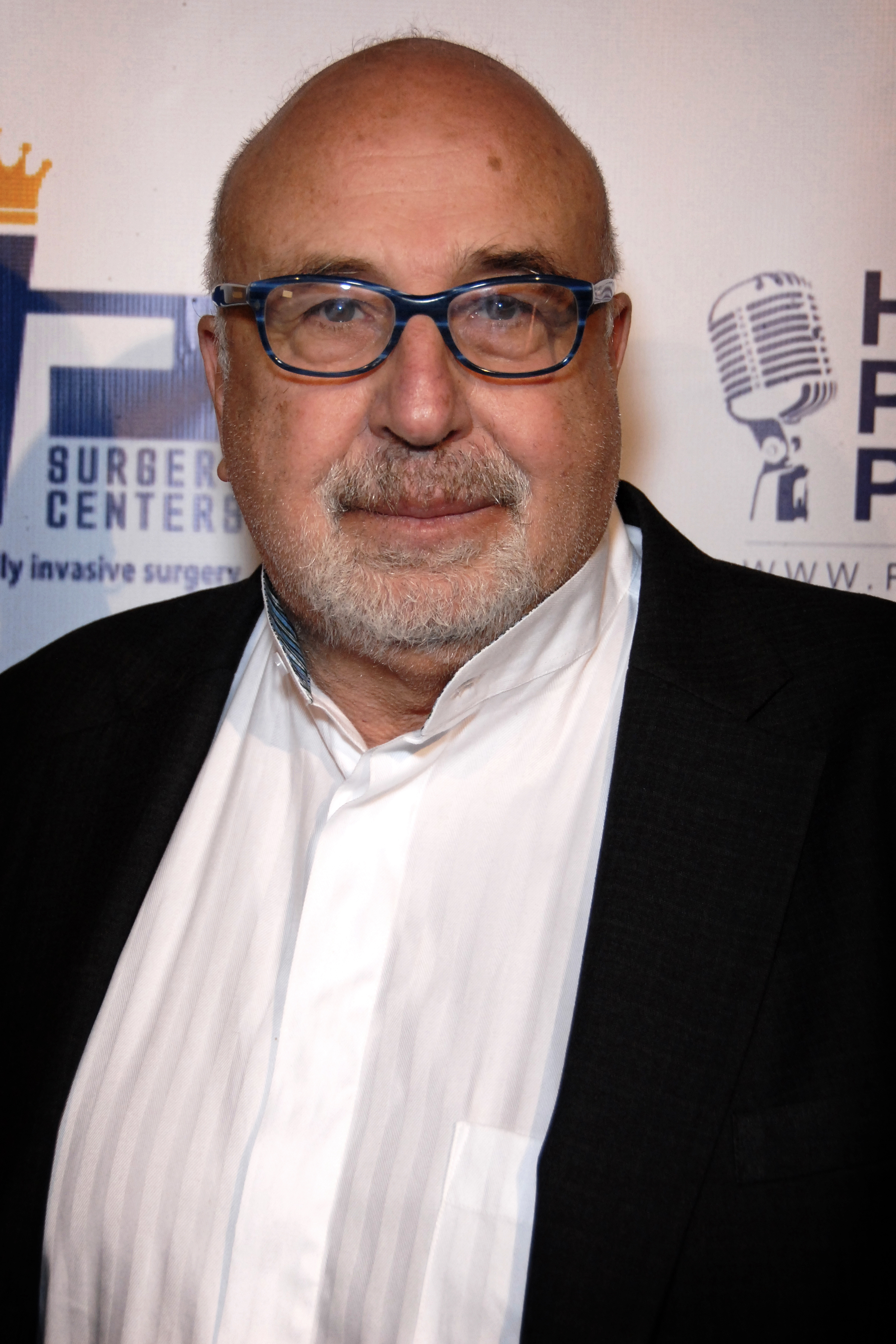

Larry Namer is best known as the founder of E! Entertainment TV, a cable network that has expanded to 142 countries and has been valued at over US$7 billion.

== Early life and career ==
Born to Turkish immigrant parents and raised in Coney Island, Brooklyn, New York City, Namer attended Abraham Lincoln High School, graduating in 1966. Namer was the first among his family to attend college, graduating from Brooklyn College, in 1971 with a degree in economics.

After graduation, he worked as an assistant cable splicer for what was then called Sterling Manhattan Cable which was later acquired by Time Inc., making $90 per week.

After several years as a technician, he became the Vice Chairman of the Cable TV division of the Electrical Workers Union. By age 25, he became the Director of Operations at Manhattan Cable and a year later was given sales and marketing. In 1979, he became Director of Corporate Development and was charged with building businesses derived from non-entertainment uses of the cable TV systems.

He was recruited to become VP/General Manager of Valley Cable TV in Los Angeles.

== Media Empire ==
In the mid-1980s, Namer and his friend Alan Mruvka created a plan for a TV network, Movietime, that would eventually become E! Entertainment Television. The platform would give rise to shows such as Talk Soup and Fashion Police starring Joan Rivers. Namer and Mruvka eventually sold their stake in the company, which is now owned by Comcast.

In 1989, he was awarded the President's Award from the National Cable Television Association. While remaining on the Board of E!, he started a media company in Russia called Comspan Communications. The company promoted and produced several hundred rock concerts and brought the soap opera Santa Barbara to Russia. Additionally, the company was heavily involved in live sporting events and produced and promoted the Champions Tennis Tour with John McEnroe, Björn Borg, and others.

After E!, Namer created and launched several companies in the United States and overseas, including Steeplechase Media, Comspan Communications, Comspan Russia, and, with Marty Pompadur and Jean Zhang, Metan Development Group. Pompadur, former Chairman of News Corporation Europe, has also served on the boards of several public companies, including Nexstar Media Group and MAXdome.

In October 2011, Namer joined the advisory board of SuperBox Inc.

Namer currently serves as the President/CEO of Metan.

== International Expansion ==
=== Comspan Communications (Russia) ===
Larry Namer is a veteran of the entertainment industry, known for his influential contributions to cable television, live events, music, and new media. Namer founded Comspan Communications, introducing Western Media and concerts to Russia. It became a media bridge between Hollywood and post-Soviet Russia. It brought Western content such as the American soap opera Santa Barbara, rock concerts, and pop culture programming.

=== Metan Global Entertainment Group (China) ===
In 2009, Namer co-founded Metan Global Entertainment Group (MGEG) with Martin Pompadur and Jean Zhang to create and distribute Western-style content for Chinese-speaking audiences worldwide.

Projects and impact:

- Hello! Hollywood! - A Mandarin weekly entertainment show that reached over 1 billion viewers.
- Return to Da Foo Tsun - A sitcom blending Chinese family themes with Western sitcom formats. It became the first Chinese series created by a Western producer to be nominated for Best Asian Comedy at the Asian Television Awards
- Planet Homebuddies (Modern Life) - A Chinese sitcom take on the American sitcom Friends, following the lives of six urban millennials living in a Shanghai loft.
- Explore the World, Nova Vita - TV series blending storytelling styles across East and West
- Metan Wen Zhi Ku - Combine Western storytelling expertise with the needs of the Chinese market, focusing on transmedia projects

Namer spent time maintaining operations across Beijing and Shanghai to guide production, distribution, and strategic partnerships. He emphasized the need to be on the ground, working with Chinese partners, and understanding the approval process and cultural differences.

== Recent Work ==
=== LJN Media ===
Namer serves as chairman and President of this media consulting and production firm. LJN Media is a media development and consulting firm founded by Larry J. Namer. The company specialises in creating, developing, and managing entertainment projects - particularly unscripted television, digital content, and production platforms.

=== Diamond Lake Minerals ===
Namer serves as the Strategic Advisor to this digital asset company.

=== Kwaai ===
In 2024, Namer was appointed to the Board of Directors of Kwaai, an open-sourced personal AI organisation.

=== World Film Institute ===
In 2025, Namer was appointed Chairman of the World Film Institute, succeeding its founder Dr. Olympia Gellini. Namer's mission is to expands WFI's reach globally, using modern, cutting-edge technology so that high-quality education in visual storytelling is available to creators everywhere. He seeks to offer accessibility: offering tools, mentorship, and opportunities that match the pace, diversity, and platforms of today's digital age (films, TikTok, etc.).

== Publications and Media Appearances ==
=== Book ===
In 2025, Namer published Offscript: Recipes for Success, a memoir that combines personal anecdotes from his career in the entertainment industry with original recipes. The book recounts his early experiences in cable television, the founding of Movietime (later E! Entertainment Television), and subsequent ventures in International media, while offering insights on entrepreneurship and leadership.

=== Media appearances ===
Namer has been featured as a guest on several podcasts and interview series, including, Live Your Dream Podcast, Hollywood Raw Podcast, The Slow Dive Podcast, Family Office Podcast, The Vibe with Kelly Cardenas, Schneps Media Podcast, The Million Dollar Branders Podcast, and the Centimillionaire Strategies.

== Awards ==
Namer has received several industry recognitions, including:

- National Cable television Association's President's Awards (1989)
- Outstanding Contribution to Asian Television Award (Asia Television Awards)
- International Legacy Award (2017 Elite Awards Foundation)
- Lifetime Achievement Awards: 2018 Hollywood Tribute
- 2019 Hollywood China Night
- Tribeca Disruptor Award (2019)
- Lifetime Achievement Award, French Riveria Film Festival (2020)
