= Steven E. de Souza =

American film director (born 1947)

- Born: Steven Edward de Souza; November 17, 1947 (age 78); Philadelphia, Pennsylvania, U.S.
- Education: Pennsylvania State University
- Occupations: Writer, director, producer
- Years active: 1972−present
- Notable work: 48 Hrs. Commando; The Running Man; Die Hard; Street Fighter; The Flintstones; Judge Dredd

Steven Edward de Souza (born November 17, 1947) is an American writer, director, and producer. He is known for writing several high-profile action films of the 1980s and 1990s, notably 48 Hrs., Commando, The Running Man, Die Hard, Die Hard 2, Hudson Hawk, Knock Off, and Judge Dredd.

== Early life ==
De Souza was born in Philadelphia, Pennsylvania on 1947, the son of a Jamaican father, H. Walton Henriques de Souza, and Evelyn (née Green). His father, a Sephardic Jew, owned a real estate company. He attended Pennsylvania State University, where he was a student of science fiction author Philip Klass (better known by his pseudonym William Tenn).

== Career ==
He began his career as a story editor for primetime television series such as The Six Million Dollar Man and The Hardy Boys Mysteries, before graduating to the role of producer and writer. He produced the first season of Knight Rider, and was the creator of the short-lived sci-fi series The Powers of Matthew Star.

De Souza started his film career writing, directing, and producing the low-budget stoner comedy Arnold's Wrecking Co., which won the Special Jury Prize at the 1972 Atlanta Film Festival. Beginning in the early 1980s, he became a prolific screenwriter of feature films, specializing in blockbuster action and thriller films like Commando and Die Hard. He wrote some of the most successful films of the era, including 48 Hrs., The Running Man, The Flintstones, and Die Hard 2. For Commando and Die Hard 2, De Souza created the fictional Latin American country Val Verde.

He was frequently hired by studios as a script doctor in order to rewrite preexisting screenplays during production to add more action and humor. He has been nominated twice for the Edgar Allan Poe award, an award given to any piece of media for excellence in mystery writing. The first in 1984 for 48 Hrs. and again in 1989 for Die Hard. De Souza also "won" the 1991 Razzie Award for Worst Screenplay for Hudson Hawk. He wrote and directed the 1994 video game adaptation Street Fighter after being introduced to the franchise by his son. Though the film received negative critical reception and failed to spawn an intended franchise, it has since become a cult classic in some circles.

In 2000, he was honored with the Norman Lear Award for Lifetime Achievement in writing. In 2004, he received the Dr. Bird award, which is given for achievement in the arts to people of Jamaican descent. De Souza appeared in the feature-length documentary Dreams on Spec, which profiled three aspiring screenwriters and featured comments from a number of distinguished writers like James L. Brooks, Nora Ephron, Carrie Fisher, and him. His Web series Unknown Sender became a triple honoree at the 2009 Webby Awards for Best Writing, Best Dramatic Series, and Best Individual Performance.

In 2011, he teamed with Family Guy director Pete Michels for the Fox Network animated pilot "Spyburbia."

== Filmography ==
=== Film writer ===
Year	Title	Director	Notes
1973	Arnold's Wrecking Co.	Himself	Atlanta Film Festival Gold Medal Award
1982	48 Hrs.	Walter Hill	Nominated- Edgar Allan Poe Award for Best Motion Picture
1983	The Return of Captain Invincible	Philippe Mora	
1985	Commando	Mark L. Lester	
1986	Jumpin' Jack Flash	Penny Marshall	Uncredited
1987	The Running Man	Paul Michael Glaser	
1988	Bad Dreams	Andrew Fleming	
1988	Die Hard	John McTiernan	Nominated- Edgar Allan Poe Award for Best Motion Picture
1988	Seven Hours to Judgment	Beau Bridges	Credited as Elliot Stephens
1990	Die Hard 2	Renny Harlin	
1991	Hudson Hawk	Michael Lehmann	Golden Raspberry Award for Worst Screenplay
1991	Ricochet	Russell Mulcahy	
1994	The Flintstones	Brian Levant	Golden Raspberry Award for Worst Screenplay
1994	Beverly Hills Cop III	John Landis	
1994	Street Fighter	Himself	
1995	Judge Dredd	Danny Cannon	
1997	Turbulence	Robert Butler	Uncredited
1998	Knock Off	Tsui Hark	
2003	Lara Croft: Tomb Raider – The Cradle of Life	Jan de Bont	
2004	Blast	Anthony Hickox	

=== Television ===
Year	Title	Director	Writer	Producer	Creator	Notes
1974–1977	The Six Million Dollar Man	No	Yes	No	No	3 episodes
1976	Gemini Man	No	Yes	No	No	3 episodes
1977	Rosetti and Ryan	No	Yes	No	No	Episode "Everybody Into the Pool"
1977–1979	The Hardy Boys/Nancy Drew Mysteries	No	Yes	No	No	2 episodes
1978	The Bionic Woman	No	Yes	No	No	2 episodes
1978	Lucan	No	Yes	No	No	Episode "The Pariah"
1981	Foul Play	No	Yes	No	No	2 episodes
1982–1983	The Powers of Matthew Star	No	Yes	Yes	Yes	
1982–1983	Knight Rider	No	Yes	Yes	No	2 episodes
1984	V	No	Yes	Supervisor	No	Episode "Dreadnought"
1988	Supercarrier	No	Yes	Executive	Yes	
1991	Tales from the Crypt	Yes	Yes	No	No	Episode "Carrion Death"
1993–1994	Cadillacs and Dinosaurs	No	Yes	Executive	No	
2002–2003	Adventure Inc.	No	No	Executive	No	
2008–2012	Unknown Sender	Yes	Yes	Executive	Yes	

TV movies

Year	Title	Director	Writer	Producer
1982	The Renegades	No	Yes	No
1987	The Spirit	No	Yes	Supervisor
1991	K-9000	No	Yes	Executive
2000	Possessed	Yes	Yes	No

== Awards and nominations ==
Won

- 2000 Norman Lear Award for Lifetime Achievement
