= S. E. Hinton bibliography =

Susan Eloise Hinton (better known as S. E. Hinton) is an American author who is best known for writing young adult fiction. The Outsiders was Hinton's first published book in 1967; Hinton started the book at the age of fifteen. Hinton based the characters, the Greasers and the Socs, off of teenage gangs and alienated youth in her hometown of Tulsa, Oklahoma during the 1960s. The Outsiders has sold over fourteen million copies since it was published. In 1983, The Outsiders became a movie, and was later released onto DVD. After experiencing a writer's block and going into a state of depression, Hinton met somebody in her freshmen biology class, who inspired her to continue writing.

Hinton followed the advice given to her and wrote her second novel, That Was Then, This Is Now in 1971. Following that, she wrote her shortest novel, Rumble Fish; it was published in 1975 after she had published a short story version in a 1968 edition of University of Tulsa's Alumni Magazine. Four years later in 1979, Tex was published and would be Hinton's last book for nine years as she devoted her time to raise her child. Hinton's next novel Taming the Star Runner was her first book that wasn't written in first-person point of view. Seven years after Taming the Star Runner, Hinton released her first children's book, Big David, Little David, which followed with the release of The Puppy Sister in 1995. In 2004, Hawkes Harbor, Hinton's first adult novel, was released. Hinton's most recent book, Some of Tim's Stories, was published in 2007 and is Hinton's third children's book. Overall, Hinton has written nine published books.

Hinton has won many awards for her books. Hinton has won the "ALA Best Books for Young Adults Award" four times; she won the award for That Was Then, This Is Now (in 1971), Rumble Fish (in 1975) and for Tex and Taming the Star Runner (in 1979). Hinton has also won a "School Library Journal Best Books of the Year Award" for Rumble Fish (in 1975), and Tex and Taming the Star Runner (in 1979). In 1979, Hinton received three other awards for both Tex and Taming the Star Runner. Hinton's first and only award for a children's book is the "Parent's Choice Silver Honor Book Award," which she won for The Puppy Sister. Overall, Hinton has won 19 awards from 21 nominations.

== Books ==
Name	Genre	Publisher	Year	# of awards won	Ref(s)
The Outsiders	Novel	Puffin Books	1967	2	
That Was Then, This Is Now	Novel	Puffin Books	1971	3	
Rumble Fish	Novel	Delacorte Press	1975	3	
Tex	Novel	Dell Publishing	1979	5	
Taming The Star Runner	Novel	Dell Publishing	1988	5	
Big David, Little David	Children's book	Doubleday Dell	1995	0	
The Puppy Sister	Fantasy	Doubleday Dell	1995	1	
Hawkes Harbor	Horror, Fantasy	Tor Books	2004	0	
Some of Tim's Stories	Short stories	University of Oklahoma Press	2007	0	

== Awards won by S. E. Hinton ==
Book	Award(s) won	Ref(s)
The Outsiders	New York Herald Tribune Best Teenage Books List (1967); Chicago Tribune Book World Spring Book Festival Honor Book (1967)	
That Was Then, This Is Now	ALA Best Books for Young Adults (1971); Chicago Tribune Book World Spring Book Festival Honor Book (1971); Massachusetts Children's Book Award (1978)	
Rumble Fish	ALA Best Books for Young Adults (1975); School Library Journal Best Books of the Year (1975); Land of the Enchantment Award, New Mexico Library Association (1982)	
Tex	ALA Best Books for Young Adults (1979); School Library Journal Best Books of the Year (1979); New York Public Library Books for the Teen-Age (1980); Sue Hefly Honor Book, Louisiana Association of School Librarians (1982); Sue Hefly Award, Louisiana Association of School Librarians (1983)	
Taming The Star Runner	ALA Best Books for Young Adults (1979); School Library Journal Best Books of the Year (1979); New York Public Library Books for the Teen-Age (1980); Sue Hefly Honor Book, Louisiana Association of School Librarians (1982); Sue Hefly Award, Louisiana Association of School Librarians (1983); Media and Max's award	
The Puppy Sister	Parent's Choice Silver Honor Book (1995)	
