= Tex (novel) =

1979 novel by S. E. Hinton

- First edition cover
- Author: S. E. Hinton
- Cover artist: Gary Watson (illustration); Leo McRee (typography)
- Language: English
- Genre: Young adult fiction
- Publisher: Delacorte Press
- Publication date: 1979
- Publication place: United States
- Media type: Print
- Pages: 194 pp.
- ISBN: 0-440-08641-8 (First edition hardcover)
- OCLC: 5103322
- Dewey Decimal: [Fic]
- LC Class: PZ7.H5976 Te
- Preceded by: Rumble Fish
- Followed by: Taming the Star Runner

Tex is a novel by S. E. Hinton, published in 1979. The book (like Rumble Fish and That Was Then, This Is Now) takes place in the same universe as Hinton's first book The Outsiders, but in a rural town called Garyville, Oklahoma, a fictional suburb of Tulsa.

Tex and his older brother Mason live by themselves while their father tours the rodeo circuit. Tex is blissfully happy with his life. He likes simple things and taking it easy. Mason, on the other hand, must step into a parental role when their father is gone for five months touring rodeos. Their mother is dead, so the two of them must fight to meet their financial obligations. The boys' lives are slowly being disrupted.

A film adaptation was released in 1982, starring Matt Dillon in the title role.

== Plot ==
The book opens with Tex McCormick, a 15-year-old who loves horses, and his brother Mason, living in a country home in a small town. Their mother died years before, and their father goes off touring rodeos for months at a time, leaving Mason, a high school senior and a star basketball player, and Tex at home.

Tex comes home to find the two brothers' horses sold. Tex considered his horse Negrito a friend, but Mason had to sell the horses to ensure they would have enough to eat through the winter. This action sets Tex against his brother for most of the book.

Living in the larger ranch house next door are the Collins, who include Mason's best friend Bob, Tex's best friend Johnny, and the younger sister whom Tex loves, Jamie. The Collins patriarch, Cole, thinks Mason and Tex are a bad influence.

After Tex finds out that his dad is not his real father, Tex runs away to the city with a family friend and gets shot. Cole calls the ambulance and he gets hospital care and recovers. He eventually learns that just living life and staying with his brother is the best thing for him.

== Characters ==
- Tex McCormick – A fifteen-year-old boy. He loves horses, especially his horse Negrito. He is faithful to his father and his brother Mason. His best friend is Johnny Collins.
- Mason McCormick – A seventeen-year-old boy, and Pop's only biological child. He loves to fish, play basketball, and serves as a father figure to Tex. Tex says he looks like "a proud hawk" (p. 86).
- Jamie Collins – Johnny's younger sister. She has a reputation for being mean, rarely going a week without being grounded or spanked. She uses threats and controlling behaviour to get her way. She is also flirty and believes passionately in women's rights.
- Johnny Collins – Tex's best friend, from the richer Collins family. They get into trouble a lot, including with Johnny's motorcycle when attempting to jump over a ditch.
- Cole Collins – Father of Blackie, Charlie, Robert (Bob), Johnny, and Jamie Collins; married to Mona Collins. He is a strict and controlling father and spanks his children. When Johnny and Tex get drunk at Charlie's party, he blames Tex. After they get in trouble at school, Mason and Cole have an argument and Mason wins Cole's respect.
- Bob Collins – Son of Cole. Brother of Jamie and Johnny. He is Mason's best friend and a good basketball player.
- Pop McCormick – Father of Mason, whom he leaves in charge of Tex. Tex is the son of another man with whom his wife had an affair. She died of pneumonia later. Pop stays away from his family a lot because of the rodeo tour, forcing him to stay away for five months.
- Lem Peters – Immature friend of the family.
- Mrs. Johnson – Tex's principal. Tex constantly gets in trouble with her, but she later promises him she will give him a job caring for horses.
- Cathy Carlson – Tex's English teacher. She is revealed to be the sister of M&M from That Was Then, This Is Now as she shows up at Mark's funeral.
- The Hitchhiker – A dangerous drug dealer who has killed several other people before kidnapping Tex and Mason. Tex gets the attention of a police officer, and they shoot him dead. He is revealed to be Mark from That Was Then, This is Now after escaping from prison.
- Mrs. Barnes – A typing teacher who works at Tex's school. She is played by Hinton in the film.
- Kelly – A drug addict who acts up after a drug deal with Lem goes wrong. He holds Tex hostage until he escapes.
- Negrito – Tex's horse until Mason sells him along with his horse Red. Tex tries to buy him back when Pop returns but fails. He was renamed as "Rowdy" in the film.
- Clare McCormick – Tex's mother. She had a fight with Pop when Tex was 2 years old and walked out in the snow without her shoes on. Tex tried to stop her, but he couldn't reach the doorknob, and she later died of pneumonia.
- Red – Mason's horse until he sells him along with Negrito. He was renamed as "Toyota" in the film. (Ironically, Toyota was the real name of the horse, owned by author S.E. Hinton herself, that portrayed Negrito, aka Rowdy.)

== Reception ==
The New York Times praised Hinton's "[keen]" rendering of the American Southwest and her depiction of the "bewilderments of adolescence". However, the review ultimately concluded that the novel was an unconvincing portrayal of contemporary teenage life: "Tex smacks, somehow, of Snoopy's It Was a Dark and Stormy Night, busier and more melodramatic than the real life it purports to show."

Kirkus Reviews affirmed that "the nerve she hit in The Outsiders can't be so tapped again" but commended Hinton for handling her "obvious exhortation, melodramatic plots, and brotherly bonds with that disarming empathy [...] which wins kids' unqualified assent."

== Film adaptation ==
A film adaptation starring Matt Dillon, Jim Metzler, and Meg Tilly was produced by Walt Disney and released by their Buena Vista Film Distribution Company in 1982. Directed by Tim Hunter, the film was shot on location in Oklahoma. Upon its release, the film received positive reviews from critics but underperformed at the box office.
