= Some of Tim's Stories =

2007 novel by S. E. Hinton

Some of Tim's Stories is a novel written by S. E. Hinton, author of the award-winning novel The Outsiders. Published in 2007, Some of Tim’s Stories is a collection of 14 intertwined short stories that explores the lives of two cousins - Mike and Terry. The title character, Tim, is a bartender and is also the author of these stories.

== Plot summary ==
Mike and Terry are cousins that are as close as brothers, whose fathers are killed in a car accident during their youth. When they are both 25, a drug deal goes wrong: Terry is imprisoned, but Mike gets away. Mike works as a bartender in Oklahoma. The short stories include flashbacks, remembering Mike's childhood and young adult life and shows how one tragedy changed their lives.

The second half of the book includes interviews with the author, S.E Hinton, in which she discusses her earlier novels, the movies based on the books, and her idea for the title of Some of Tim’s Stories.

== Short stories ==
- The Missed Trip-(Aged 10) Every October, since they were twelve years old, Mike and Terry's fathers have gone on a hunting trip. Mike and Terry want to go with them but they are not allowed to go for another two years; Mike's father even says: “Don’t be too anxious for this, Michael. It’s the beginning of the end of childhood.” Despite the fact Mike and Terry were not allowed to go, the trip turned out to be “the beginning of the end of [their] childhood” because their fathers were killed in a car accident.
- Full Moon Birthday- (Aged 21) On Mike's twenty-first birthday Terry says: “It’s Friday the thirteenth, a full moon, and your twenty-first birthday. Anything could happen...” (p. 7) After Terry is caught kissing a girl in a bar, Mike and Terry have to run through the woods and jump into an icy river to avoid her boyfriend and his angry friends. A woman with a husky voice named Chris offers a shivering Mike and Terry a ride. She takes them back to her place and gives them some of her ex-husband's clothes.

It is alluded to that Terry and Chris have a sexual encounter; and Mike wishes on the full moon that he would “...see Terry get worried” The next morning, they return to the bar to retrieve their truck and grab lunch. The waitress there tells them that the city is the “...sex-change capital of the world.” He asks Terry he thinks Chris is actually a man. While revealing to the reader that he knows Chris is a woman, he celebrates the fact that he finally saw Terry worried.

- Different Shorelines-This story goes through four different seasons at the lake.

Spring 1987-Mike and Terry collapse onto the shore after a race which Mike won. They talk about how they skipped school for the day; and even though they could get home without being caught, Mike would rather stay and fish. “It was a real nice day for the lake.”

Summer 1994-Mike and Terry speak about owning a boat and a truck. Terry reminds him that they will soon have enough money for both, but Mike seems uneasy about where the money will be coming from.

Fall 1996-Mike is at the lake with his Aunt Jelly. Aunt Jelly reminisces about the days when she would take Mike and Terry there as children. Mike, however, could only think about where Terry was at that moment.

Winter 1999-Mike walks along the shore alone. He threw a stick for his dog, Amos, to fetch. When Amos returned, he put his head on Mike’s knee and whined. Mike got up for work, knowing something was his fault.

- The Will- (Aged 23) Mike goes to the reading of his mother's will. Mike's relationship with his mother turned bitter after she was remarried; however, because of Terry's persistence, he still went to see her in the hospital before she died. To the shock of Mike and his step-father, Mike's mother had left the house to him. Mike tells his step-father he has 24 hours to move out of the house; “Those were the exact same words he had heard six years before, when he thought he had left that house forever.”
- What’s Your Poison-(Aged 28) Mike has been working as a bartender and bouncer at a bar for three years. In those three years, “He had gotten real good at knowing what people wanted.” His job was to give to “Give people what they were thirsty for” whether it was a beer or a listening ear.
- The Girl Who Loved Movies-The narrator is talking about the only girl who he was ever in love with. She loved movies, and while she would sit and talk about the actors and how each movie was made, he would sit and watch her.
- Sentenced-Because he feels so guilty, everything in Mike's life reminds him of Terry. He had even broken up with his girlfriend because Mike couldn't handle the idea of Terry being alone in jail. While visiting his Aunt Jelly, Mike recounts the day Terry was arrested. He and Terry had been waiting in a deserted parking lot for the drug dealers they were doing business with. Mike goes across the street to the Jiffy Mart for a slurpie. While waiting for the clerk to ring up his purchase, Mike sees the police lights down the alleyway where he had been moments before with Terry. When questioned, Mike said he was at home watching television; his alibi fit with Terry's story that he was alone in the drug deal. Mike did not go to Terry's sentencing.
- After the Party-Mike has thrown a bachelor party for his friend Cody. Everybody who had gone said it was a great party.
- Jailed-Ed arrives at Mike's house uninvited with a pizza and whiskey; the two talk about the events that took place the night before. Mike tries to throw an unruly customer out of the bar, but the man punches him. Mike and the man fight and Mike was put into handcuffs by a police officer. Ed assures him that the man will drop all the charges. Mike talks to Ed about Terry and Ed tells him that Terry may still come out of his sentence alright. Then, Mike passes out.
- Class Time-Mike has begun taking classes at a community college, and taking the suggestion of a good-looking woman, he signs up for the American Short Story class. He arrives at the first class to realize that the good-looking woman was the teacher of the class. He watched her and sometimes “he could feel her watching him” too.
- Visit-This story recounts the first time Mike went to visit Terry in prison. They talk for a bit but each discussion only ended in silence. They have always been able to share everything, and: “...they should be sharing this- but Mike was walking free.” Mike tries apologizing to Tim for getting out of the jail sentence, but Tim tells him he is thankful that Mike isn't with him.
- The Sweetest Sound-This story is a flashback to a night in Mike's childhood, in which he was woken up by shouts coming from his father while he slept. Mike's mother said he “...was having a bad dream.” Mike's father calls him over, and hugs him tightly and listens to his heartbeat; “It was the sweetest sound...” When he lets Mike go, Mike's father plays with military tags around his neck.
- Homecoming-(Aged 29) A party is thrown for Terry's release from prison and homecoming. Although Terry seems worn out, Mike is assured that“[prison] didn't break him.”
- No White Light No Tunnel-Mike is cleaning up the tables after closing at the bar when door opens. He turns to see a .38 gun being pointed at him, and the man holding it demands money. Next thing he knows, Mike is lying on the floor and “....felt like someone had slammed him in the chest with a tire iron.” Ed comes out of the back room and chases the robber out into the parking lot where he shoots him. Ed tries to keep Mike calm so they talk. Mike remembers and is comforted by his father’s idea of God; “God would like to help people...People make their own hell. God doesn’t send them there.” Ed tells Mike to focus on one thing he is afraid of but can “...handle if he concentrates” and Mike says he is afraid he is going to scream when the medics try to move him. Ed tells him to focus on that.

== Main characters ==
- Mike-narrator. Best friend and cousin of Terry; he works as a drug dealer until Terry is arrested. After the arrest, Mike works as a bartender. His guilt causes him to drink excessively and even breaks up with the woman he loves because he cannot handle the idea that he is happy while Terry is imprisoned.
- Terry-Best friend and cousin of Mike; he is very talkative and very rarely gets worried or anxious. He works as a drug dealer and is arrested in a drug bust.

== Minor characters (in order of appearance) ==
- Mike's father: appeared in The Missed Trip and The Sweetest Sound.
- Uncle TJ-Terry's father; appeared in The Missed Trip.
- Mike's Mother: appeared in The Missed Trip, The Will, and The Sweetest Sound.
- Aunt Jelly-Terry's mother; appeared in The Missed Trip, Different Shorelines, and Sentenced.
- Ed-Mike's older coworker at the bar; appeared in What’s Your Poison, Jailed, and No White Light No Tunnel.
- Amber-The girl who Mike fell in love with; appeared in The Girl Who Loved Movies and Class Time.

== Title explained ==
Although the collection is called Some of Tim’s Stories, Tim is never mentioned in any of the stories. In an interview conducted by Teresa Miller, founder and executive director of the Oklahoma Center for Poets and Writers, S.E Hinton explained: “Tim is the author of these stories. I took a roundabout way of writing in first person, using a narrator who writes his stories in third person...[Tim] went to a community college...got interested in short stories and decided to write about his life. But he disguised the stories.”

== Reviews ==
The New York Times- “Hinton may never top The Outsiders. But by telling it like it was, she left a record of the way things were—a record that can’t be revised or erased, even after we’ve crushed that last Marlboro box and left it behind forever.”

Publishers Weekly- “Hinton is clearly aiming for terse, but what's here feels bare bones; interviews with the author take up more space than these plainspoken tales.”

Booklist- “Readers curious about a beloved writer's mature output won't want to skip the novella, aimed at an adult audience, where linked vignettes about male cousins form a smooth continuum with Hinton's gritty, guy-dominated YA novels."
