= That Was Then... This Is Now =

1985 film by Christopher Cain

- Theatrical release poster
- Directed by: Christopher Cain
- Screenplay by: Emilio Estevez
- Based on: That Was Then, This Is Now by S. E. Hinton
- Produced by: Gary R. Lindberg; John M. Ondov
- Starring: Emilio Estevez; Craig Sheffer; Kim Delaney; Jill Schoelen; Barbara Babcock; Frank Howard; Frank McCarthy; Larry Scott; Morgan Freeman
- Cinematography: Juan Ruiz Anchía
- Edited by: Ken Johnson
- Music by: Bill Cuomo; Keith Olsen
- Distributed by: Paramount Pictures
- Release date: November 8, 1985
- Running time: 102 minutes
- Country: United States
- Language: English
- Budget: $3.5 million
- Box office: $8,630,068 (United States)

That Was Then... This Is Now is a 1985 American drama film based on the novel of the same name by S. E. Hinton. The film was directed by Christopher Cain, distributed by Paramount Pictures, and stars Emilio Estevez (who also wrote the screenplay) and Craig Sheffer.

== Synopsis ==
Troubled teen Mark Jennings has always looked up to his older friend, Bryon Douglas, who Mark sees as the older brother he never had. But when Bryon starts dating Cathy Carlson and begins to act more responsible, Mark feels left out. Without Bryon's stabilizing influence, Mark begins acting out and gets into dealing drugs. After the friends' mentor Charlie Woods suddenly dies and Cathy's brother goes missing, Bryon suspects Mark is involved.

== Cast ==
- Craig Sheffer as Bryon Douglas
- Emilio Estevez as Mark Jennings
- Jill Schoelen as Angela Shepard
- Larry B. Scott as Terry Jones
- Kim Delaney as Cathy Carlson
- Barbara Babcock as Mrs. Douglas
- Frank Howard as M&M Carlson
- Morgan Freeman as Charlie Woods
- Francis X. McCarthy as Mr. Carlson
- Diane Dorsey as Mrs. Carlson
- Ramon Estevez AKA Ramon Sheen as Mike Chambers
- Dan Lyon as "Car" Guy
- Sharon Thomas as Doctor

== Production ==
In 1982, Emilio Estevez co-starred in the film version of S. E. Hinton's Tex. During filming, Estevez read That Was Then, This Is Now, also by Hinton, and enjoyed the book so much he drafted several screenplays before purchasing the rights. Estevez described the book as "a very intense, dark piece. It's kind of like the old Pat O'Brien-Jimmy Cagney movies where O'Brien becomes the priest and Cagney becomes the gangster". Estevez did a rewrite of the film during the making of The Breakfast Club, staying up all night to write after the typical 12 hour filming day. After speaking with Hinton, who recommended he also play one of the characters, Estevez attempted to sell the screenplay, but studios were reluctant.

Estevez' father Martin Sheen bought the rights to That Was Then, This Is Now in 1982. "I knew it would be hot", said Estevez of the novel, who said in 1983 he wanted to star along with Tom Cruise. Estevez found two Midwest producers interested in making the film and they succeeded in raising the finance. One of them, Gary Lindberg, ran a production company that mostly made TV commercials, based in Minnesota. The film was shot in the summer of 1984 in St. Paul, Minnesota, without a distributor. It was later advertised as "the first Minnesota movie".

Sheen recommended his son play Bryon Douglas, but Estevez, wary of being typecast, chose to play what he saw as the "sympathetic bad guy". Estevez said: "There's probably a lot of him in me, the alter ego screaming to get out every once in a while. Fortunately, I was able to vent it in a film and not in real life".

Estevez said that they have been able to learn from the other Hinton adaptations: "We made it very contemporary, hired a brilliant cinematographer. The cast is primarily unknowns so it has a real feel – you're not watching movie stars. The emotional content is so rich, so full, it's absolutely draining. It's a terrific movie".

== Reception ==
The film opened November 8, 1985 and finished sixth place for the weekend with a gross of $2,502,780, behind other openers such as Target and Translyvania 6-5000. It was a minor success at the box office, grossing $8.6 million.

On Rotten Tomatoes the film holds a 0% rating based on 5 reviews. On Metacritic it has a score of 45% based on reviews from 6 critics, indicating "mixed or average reviews".

== Home media ==
That Was Then... This Is Now was released on VHS by Paramount Home Video in 1986.
