= Rumble Fish (novel) =

1975 novel by S. E. Hinton

- First hardcover edition, 1975
- Author: S. E. Hinton
- Language: English
- Genre: Young adult novel
- Publisher: Delacorte Press
- Publication date: 1975
- Publication place: United States
- Media type: Print (Paperback)
- Pages: 122
- ISBN: 0440059194
- Preceded by: That Was Then, This Is Now
- Followed by: Tex

Rumble Fish is a 1975 novel for young adults by S. E. Hinton, author of The Outsiders. It was adapted to film and directed by Francis Ford Coppola in 1983.

== Plot ==
Rusty-James runs into his old friend, Steve Hays, at the beach. It has been five years since they last saw each other. Steve is in college and Rusty is not long out of the reformatory. When Steve looks at the scar on Rusty's side, Rusty tells him that he got it in a knife fight. Steve remembers, and tells Rusty he was there when it happened. When Steve mentions that Rusty looks just like someone from their past, Rusty thinks he could have been happy to see Steve again if he had not made him remember everything.

Rusty tells his story. At the age of 14, Rusty is hanging out at Benny's, playing pool with his friends when he learns that Biff Wilcox wants to kill him. Rusty seems to think that Biff wants to kill him for the comments he made about a girl named Anita. He tells his friends what he said, and when the gang agrees that Rusty is telling the truth, the notion of fighting about it seems silly.

Rusty gets angry with Steve for bringing up Motorcycle Boy (Rusty's older brother, a former leader of the gang) and makes plans to fight Biff. At the fight day, Rusty is spending some time with his girlfriend, Patty. They make out and James falls asleep while there, nearly missing the fight. Later, Rusty arrives to fight Biff and is accompanied by his friends Steve, Smokey Bennet, and B. J. Jackson. Biff, too, brings some friends for backup. Biff's erratic behavior leads Rusty to believe that he is on drugs, which causes him to worry that the fight will not be a fair one. Rusty's fears are confirmed when Biff pulls a knife. Rusty is able to knock the knife away from Biff and beats him until it appears the fight is over. The Motorcycle Boy arrives and announces his return. Rusty is momentarily distracted and vulnerable to being attacked. Biff seizes the opportunity to grab the knife and stabs Rusty in the side. Motorcycle Boy steps in and ends the fight by breaking Biff's wrist.

Motorcycle Boy and Steve manage to get Rusty home to the apartment the boys share with their mostly absent alcoholic father. Motorcycle Boy talks about his recent trip to California. Rusty falls asleep and dreams about his older brother. Rusty is uncomfortable being himself and is preoccupied with becoming just like his brother.

Despite the knife wound, Rusty shows up for school the next day. After school, he steals a set of hubcaps from a car near Benny's, while Steve talks about his mother's recent hospitalization. The owner of the car notices the theft in progress and begins chasing the boys, accompanied by a couple of his friends. Rusty and Steve barely escape. The situation scares Steve, and he cries as they walk home. Rusty assumes that Steve is crying about his mother, but Rusty never knew his own mother, so he cannot relate.

When Patty finds out that Rusty had been with another girl at the party, she breaks up with him. Rusty feels there is nothing he can do to change what has happened. That same day, the principal at Rusty's school loses all patience with his misbehavior and truancy and informs Rusty that he is to be transferred to another school attended by Biff, his bitter rival. Rusty decides that he has nothing to lose by continuing his gang lifestyle. He recruits Motorcycle Boy and Steve to go out drinking to help him forget this terrible day.

Motorcycle Boy tells Rusty that while he was in California, he saw their mother. Rusty has only vague memories of her because she abandoned the family when he was aged two. Rusty's father began drinking when his mother left.

After watching Motorcycle Boy play pool, Rusty and Steve get separated from him and end up in an unfamiliar part of town. The boys are mugged and Rusty is beaten. Once again, Motorcycle Boy saves them. Rusty goes to Steve's house and discovers that Steve's father had beaten him severely for staying out past curfew the night before. Rusty tells Steve that he is worried about his brother, but he is not sure why. He asks Steve to help keep an eye on him. Steve refuses because he cannot afford to do anything that would cause him to get into more trouble. Rusty leaves, and he will not see Steve until they meet at the beach in five years.

Rusty goes to Benny's and finds out that Patty is now dating his friend Smokey who had set Rusty up by inviting the other girls to get Patty to break up with him. Instead of being angry, Rusty envies Smokey for being smart enough to think up that kind of a plan. B. J. tells Rusty that Motorcycle Boy is in the pet store looking at the fish. Rusty goes to the pet store, and the two watch the fish. Motorcycle Boy calls them rumble fish because they would kill each other if they could. He wonders if the fish would still act that way if they were in the river.

Later that night, Motorcycle Boy breaks into the pet store and starts setting the animals free. Rusty tries to stop him, but it is no use. Motorcycle Boy grabs the rumble fish and heads for the river as police arrive. An officer fires a warning shot, but since he is half-deaf, he cannot hear it. He gets shot and dies near the river with the rumble fish flopping on the ground, dying beside him. Rusty knows the shooting was intentional. He screams and smashes his fists through the window of the police car, so that they will have to take him to the hospital.

Rusty is back on the beach with Steve, five years later. Steve asks him if he ever went back home after his brother's death. Rusty says no. Steve invites him out for dinner and tells him where to meet later. Rusty decides that he never wants to see Steve again so that he can start forgetting about Motorcycle Boy.

== Characters ==
Rusty-James is the main character of the novel. Rusty-James is 14, and he has already started drinking, smoking, gang-fighting and playing pool for money, all of which is considered normal in his group of friends. Rusty-James says that he and his older brother The Motorcycle Boy look alike (though nobody else thinks so), with the same "odd shade of dark red hair, like black-cherry pop" and "Hershey bar" eyes. Rusty-James says that his memory is screwed up sometimes; that's why at the very start of the book he has trouble remembering who his old-best friend, Steve Hays, is.

The Motorcycle Boy, whose real name is never mentioned, is Rusty-James' older brother. He is said to have an obsession with motorcycles and is away from home for long periods of time. On a trip to California, he finds their mother who left home when Rusty-James was very young. Everyone likes him. Rusty-James says that people look at him, stop, and then look again. Towards the end of the book The Motorcycle Boy is in the pet store staring at some Betta fish, which he calls "Rumble Fish", hence the name of the book.

Steve Hays is Rusty-James' best friend. Rusty-James says that Steve is 14, like him, but looks 12. Unlike Rusty-James, Steve doesn't smoke, drink or fight.

Biff Wilcox is Rusty-James' rival, introduced early in the book when Rusty is told that Biff wants to kill him. They have a knife-fight where Rusty almost wins but is distracted by the arrival of The Motorcycle Boy; when Rusty-James looks at The Motorcycle Boy, Biff grabs the knife and slashes it across Rusty-James' side, leaving a long gash. Rusty-James is later expelled from school and placed in Biff's school.

Patty is Rusty-James' girlfriend until half-way through the book when she learns that Rusty-James was seen fooling around with a black-haired girl at a party. She and Rusty's friend Smokey later become a couple. Smokey later admits that he made sure Patty found out about Rusty-James and the girl so that she would date him instead.

Rusty-James' mother lives in California. She left a long time ago when Rusty was only a small boy. She is referenced many times throughout the book, but never shown. Readers only know her as The moter cycle boy & Rusty-James´s mother who left the family long before he could remember.

Rusty-James' father lives with the boys but goes out drinking all day so he is hardly ever home; when he is home though he practically ignores Rusty. Motorcycle Boy tells Rusty-James that the reason he can't stand to be home alone is that when their mother left, she took Motorcycle Boy with her and his father went on a three-day drinking binge, and Rusty-James (age 2 at the time) was left alone to fend for himself for that time.

== Awards and nominations ==
- ALA Best Books for Young Adults, 1975
- School Library Journal Best Books of the Year, 1975
- Land of the Enchantment Award, New Mexico Library Association, 1982

== Bibliography ==
- Hinton, S. E (1975), Rumble Fish, New York City: Delacorte Press, ISBN 0440059194
