= Teresa Miller (writer) =

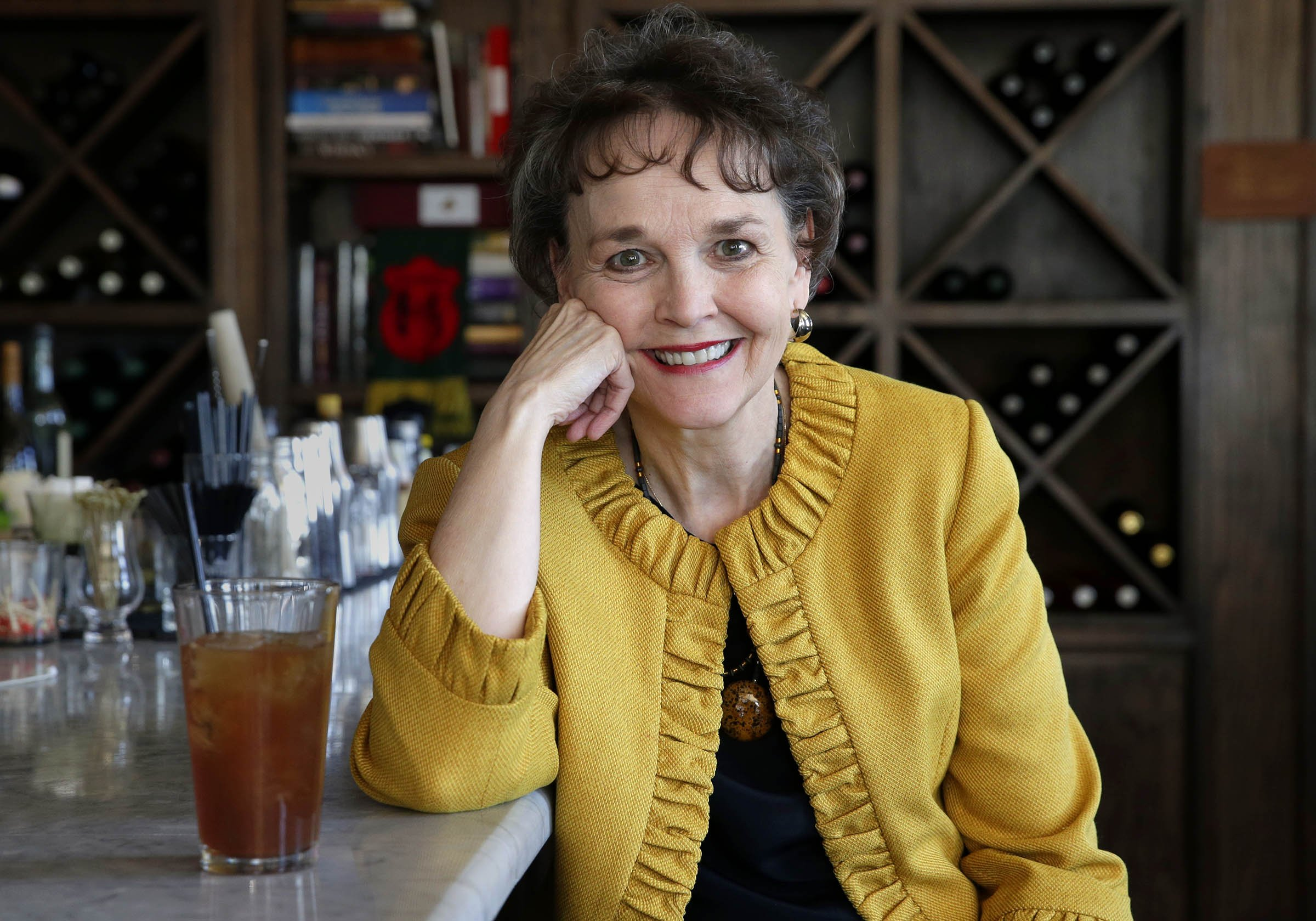
Teresa Miller in 2013

Teresa Miller (born November 23, 1952) is an American writer, television host, and literary activist. She resides in Tulsa, where she works as full-time writer.

== Early life and education ==
Miller, a fourth generation Oklahoman, was born in Tahlequah, Oklahoma. She attended Northeastern Oklahoma State University, where she received a Bachelor of Arts degree in English/journalism in 1970 and a Master of Education degree in 1975. Additionally, she did postgraduate work at the University of Tulsa.

== Literary Activism ==
When Miller suffered a writer's block after the publication of her first novel, Remnants of Glory, she became active in promoting the works of other writers by establishing the Oklahoma Center for Poets and Writers, which she led (1994-2015) under alternate names at several Oklahoma schools before settling into its permanent home at Oklahoma State University. Under Miller's leadership, the Center sponsored nationally known writers such as Maya Angelou, Isabel Allende, and Frank McCourt, while also presenting Oklahoma Writers, via the Oklahoma Writers Hall of Fame.

Miller also launched/edited the Oklahoma Storyteller series at the University of Oklahoma Press (2007-2011), featuring writers Michael Wallis, Rilla Askew, S. E. Hinton, Fred R. Harris, N. Scott Momaday, Jim Lehrer, and John Wooley.

In 2012 and again in 2015, Miller served as guest curator for the Oklahoma History Center's exhibit Oklahoma Writers--a Literary Tableau.

Miller has received numerous awards for her work, including being named Director Emerita for the Center for Poets and Writers at Oklahoma State University. In 2019, she was inducted into the Oklahoma Writers Hall of Fame.

== Writing Out Loud ==
Writing Out Loud has been a radio and television series hosted by Miller in various incarnations and venues throughout her career that featured extended interviews with major authors. From 1999 to 2015, a television version, produced by Miller at Oklahoma State University, appeared on OETA, Oklahoma's PBS affiliate, and on the Internet broadcast site Write TV.

== Teaching ==
Miller, who retired from teaching in 2015, has taught at several Oklahoma colleges and universities, most recently at Oklahoma State University, where she focused on creative writing classes and courses on regional authors. One of her writing students, PC Cast, went onto became a bestselling author. Miller herself is a character in Cast's novels Goddess of Spring and Goddess of the Sea, and her late cat Skylar is a recurring character in Cast's House of Night series.

== Publications ==
Remnants of Glory, Seaview Books, 1981 (novel)

Remnants of Glory, Berkley Books, 1982 (novel/reprint edition)

Remnants of Glory, Hawk Publishing, 1999 (novel/reprint edition)

Family Correspondence, Hawk Publishing, 2000 (novel)

Some of Tim’s Stories by S. E. Hinton, interviews conducted by Teresa Miller, University of Oklahoma Press, 2007 (short stories/interviews)

Means of Transit, University of Oklahoma Press, 2008 (memoir)

"Pat Conroy and Telephone Noir," essay in Our Prince of Scribes--Writers Remember Pat Conroy, University of Georgia Press, 2018 (anthology)

Love Can Be--A Literary Collection About Our Animals, Kirkpatrick Foundation, 2018 (anthology/Teresa Miller coeditor and contributor)
