= The Saint of Fort Washington =

1993 US drama film by Tim Hunter

- Theatrical release poster
- Directed by: Tim Hunter
- Written by: Lyle Kessler
- Produced by: Nessa Hyams; David V. Picker
- Starring: Matt Dillon; Danny Glover; Rick Aviles; Nina Siemaszko; Ving Rhames; Joe Seneca
- Narrated by: Danny Glover
- Cinematography: Frederick Elmes
- Edited by: Howard E. Smith
- Music by: James Newton Howard
- Production company: Warner Bros.
- Distributed by: Warner Bros. (North America); J&M Entertainment (international)
- Release dates: September 13, 1993 (TIFF); November 17, 1993 (United States)
- Running time: 99 minutes
- Country: United States
- Language: English
- Budget: $6–7 million
- Box office: $134,454

The Saint of Fort Washington is a 1993 American drama film directed by Tim Hunter and starring Matt Dillon and Danny Glover. Dillon won the award for Best Actor at the 1993 Stockholm Film Festival for his performance.

Despite the poor box office returns, The Saint of Fort Washington received positive reviews from critics, with many praising the performances of Dillon and Glover.

== Plot ==
Matthew is a young man with a good heart but suffers from sporadic schizophrenic tendencies. He ends up with nowhere to live after a slumlord tears down his tenement. Matthew is forced to reside at Fort Washington Armory, a nearby shelter. Bullied by punks, he turns to a homeless military veteran, Jerry, for help on how to survive. Together they form a friendship that changes both of their lives forever.

== Cast ==
- Danny Glover as Jerry / The Narrator
- Matt Dillon as Matthew
- Rick Aviles as Rosario
- Nina Siemaszko as Tamsen
- Ving Rhames as Little Leroy
- Michael Badalucco as Bridge Cop #2

== Release ==
The film had its world premiere on September 13, 1993, at the Toronto International Film Festival. It received a limited theatrical release on November 17, 1993.

== Reception ==
=== Box office ===
The movie opened at #22, making $19,409. It made a total American gross of $134,454 in its limited release.

=== Critical reception ===
The Saint of Fort Washington holds an 80% "Fresh" rating on Rotten Tomatoes based on 10 reviews.

Roger Ebert gave the movie 3 out of 4 stars, praising Glover and Dillon's acting. He wrote, "Glover and Dillon make characters who seem comfortable with each other; it is easier to fight the world together. Both actors resist any temptation to reach for pathos in their roles. The Glover character, angered at being cheated out of a small business, has great fury at the world, but has learned mostly to control it; he needs someone to care for, and comes to love the younger man almost as a son. And Dillon, saddled with sainthood in the film's title, plays against sentimentality most of the time." Jonathan Rosenbaum of the Chicago Reader wrote, "This isn’t a perfect movie, and it may occasionally err on the side of Dickensian sentiment, but I it has so much to say about the world we live in and says it with such grace, wit, and raw feeling that I recommend it without qualification."

Janet Maslin of The New York Times was similarly positive, writing "The film's visual backdrop often supplies what its dialogue lacks, as Mr. Hunter—and the cinematographer Frederick Elmes, creating vivid urban landscapes—convey a strong sense of the characters' restrictive domain", and concluded the film "works best when it avoids even a hint of the metaphorical and sticks to the plain, hard facts."

Critiques of the film noted that the "particulars of playwright Lyle Kessler's script often seem phony, contrived and far too politely worked out for the harshness of the conditions on display", and that "drugs, alcohol and crime are never mentioned, and filmmakers offer no clues as to how they think society should regard and, in turn, deal with the homeless in any way other than is now the case." Ebert commented, "The film's flaw, I think, is to spend too much time with the melodrama surrounding the bully of the Fort Washington Shelter." Peter Rainer of the Los Angeles Times opined the screenplay's "deification" of its characters was unnecessary and that "the filmmakers are so intent on creating a fable that the more realistic aspects of the story lose some of their bite."

=== Accolades ===
At the 1993 Toronto International Film Festival, the film came in second place for the People's Choice Award. Matt Dillon was nominated for Best Supporting Actor at the Chicago Film Critics Association Awards and won the Best Actor Award at the Stockholm Film Festival.
