= Apollo 11 (1996 film) =

- Genre: Docudrama
- Written by: Phil Penningroth
- Directed by: Norberto Barba
- Starring: Xander Berkeley; Jim Metzler; Jeffrey Nordling; Jane Kaczmarek; Wendie Malick; Maureen Mueller; Carmen Argenziano; Jack Conley; Ted Raimi; Matt Frewer; Dennis Lipscomb
- Music by: Phil Marshall
- Country of origin: United States
- Original language: English

Production
- Executive producer: James Manos Jr.
- Cinematography: Chris Walling
- Editor: Allan Holzman
- Running time: 90 minutes
- Production companies: James Manos Productions; MTM Enterprises

Original release
- Network: The Family Channel
- Release: November 17, 1996

Apollo 11 is a 1996 American docudrama television film about the Apollo 11 spaceflight. It was directed by Norberto Barba, written by Phil Penningroth, and stars Xander Berkeley, Jim Metzler, Jeffrey Nordling, Jane Kaczmarek, Wendie Malick, Maureen Mueller, Carmen Argenziano, Jack Conley, Ted Raimi, and Matt Frewer. It aired on November 17, 1996 on The Family Channel, and was nominated for a Primetime Emmy.

== Plot ==
Fearful that the Soviets would continue their lead in the Space Race and be the first to put a man on the Moon, NASA felt an enormous pressure to push the Apollo Program forward as quickly as possible, though they knew that pushing too hard could lead to disaster. This film recreates the tensions that were felt not only by the three astronauts, Neil Armstrong, Buzz Aldrin, and Michael Collins, but also by their families and by the teams of technicians training to deal with anything that could go wrong.

== Cast ==
- Jeffrey Nordling as commander Neil Armstrong
- Xander Berkeley as Apollo Lunar Module pilot Buzz Aldrin. Berkeley was also cast in Apollo 13, which was thought to have aided him in acquiring this role
- Jim Metzler as Command module pilot Michael Collins
- Jane Kaczmarek as Jan Armstrong
- Wendie Malick as Pat Collins
- Maureen Mueller as Joan Aldrin
- Matt Frewer as Gene Kranz
- Jake Lloyd as Mark Armstrong
- Dennis Lipscomb as George Low

== Development ==
The film was developed in response to the positive reviews of the 1995 film Apollo 13. Executive producer James Manos Jr. thinks the reason no movie was made previously was that, "at first glance it didn't seem as if anything dramatic happened".

They received NASA's permission to record portions of the film in the original Apollo Mission Control Center. Engineers at the complex volunteered to make some of the equipment work like it did in 1969, to add authenticity.

Buzz Aldrin, one of the three Apollo 11 astronauts, contributed to this movie as technical consultant. He was not always on the film set, but he made an effort to keep up with the film's production. He was filmed for a cameo, but the scene was cut. During the scene, he played a clergyman that interacted with Xander Berkeley, who portrayed Aldrin in the film. Neil Armstrong was asked by Aldrin if he was interested in participating in the film's creation, but Armstrong never got back to him.

== Release ==
The film was released on Sunday, November 17, 1996 on The Family Channel at 7 p.m. EST as a part of a FAM Sunday Night Movie Event. Following the movie on the premiere night, Aldrin and others answered questions about spaceflight live in a feature titled From the Moon to Mars.

The film was nominated for a 1997 Primetime Emmy for Sound Mixing for a Drama, Miniseries, or Special.

== See also ==
- Apollo 11 in popular culture
