= Matt Dillon =

American actor (born 1964)

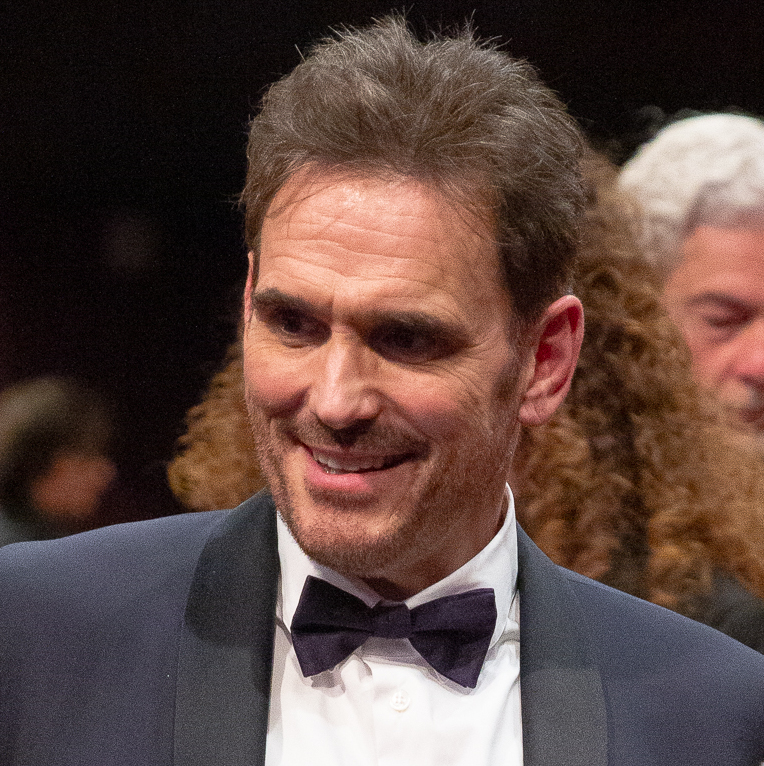
- Dillon in 2024
- Born: Matthew Raymond Dillon; February 18, 1964 (age 62); New Rochelle, New York, U.S.
- Occupation: Actor
- Years active: 1979–present
- Relatives: Kevin Dillon (brother); Jim Raymond (great uncle); Alex Raymond (great uncle)
- Awards: Full list

Matthew Raymond Dillon (born February 18, 1964) is an American actor. He made his feature film debut in Over the Edge (1979) and established himself as a teen idol by starring in the films My Bodyguard (1980), Little Darlings (1980), Liar's Moon (1982), The Flamingo Kid (1984) and three of the four film adaptations of S. E. Hinton's books: Tex (1982), Rumble Fish (1983) and The Outsiders (1983). From the late 1980s onward, Dillon achieved further success, starring in Drugstore Cowboy (1989), Singles (1992), The Saint of Fort Washington (1993), To Die For (1995), Beautiful Girls (1996), In & Out (1997), There's Something About Mary (1998), and Wild Things (1998). In a 1991 article, movie critic Roger Ebert referred to him as the best actor within his age group, along with Sean Penn.

In 2002, he made his directorial debut with City of Ghosts and has since continued to act in films such as Factotum (2005), You, Me and Dupree (2006), The House That Jack Built (2018), Asteroid City (2023), and I Play Rocky (2026). For Crash (2004), he won an Independent Spirit Award and was nominated for a Golden Globe Award and the Academy Award for Best Supporting Actor. He had earlier been nominated for the Grammy Award for Best Spoken Word Album for narrating Jack Kerouac's On the Road. On television, he starred in the first season of the FOX television series Wayward Pines (2015), for which he was nominated for a Saturn Award.

== Early life ==
Dillon was born on 18 February 1964 in New Rochelle, New York. He was raised in a close-knit Irish Catholic family in Mamaroneck, New York by homemaker Mary Ellen and Paul Dillon, a portrait painter and sales manager for Union Camp. Paul Dillon also was the long-time golf coach at Fordham University, having been elected into the school's Hall of Fame in 2019.

Dillon was named for the main character from the radio and TV Western drama series Gunsmoke. He is the second of six children, with one sister and four brothers (one of whom is actor Kevin Dillon). His paternal grandmother was the sister of comic strip artist Alex Raymond, the creator of Flash Gordon.

== Career ==
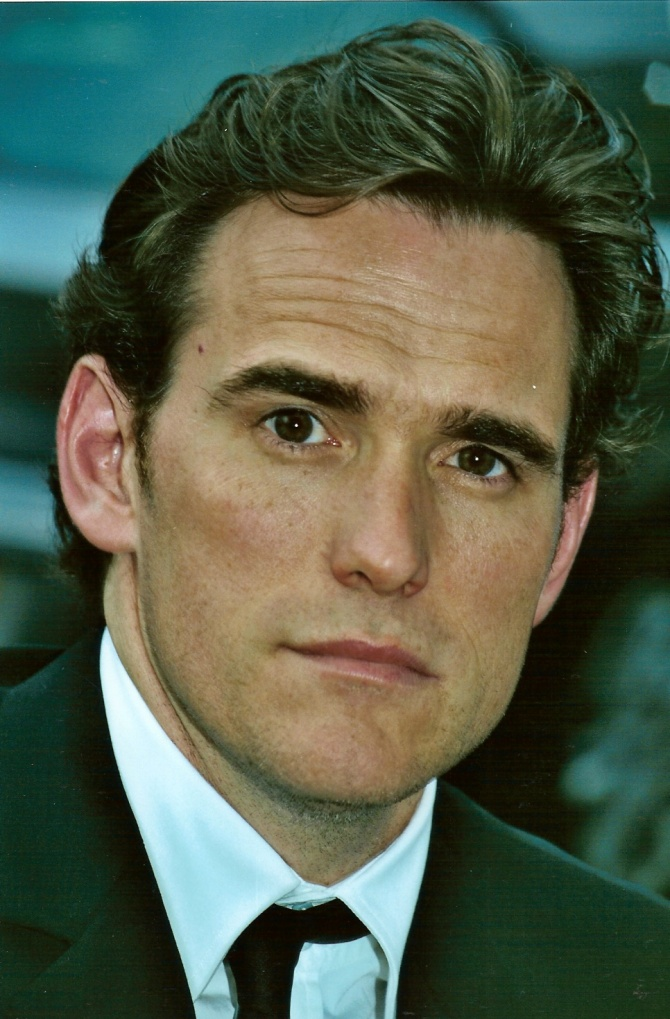
Dillon at the 2005 Cannes Film Festival

In 1978, Jane Bernstein and a friend were helping director Jonathan Kaplan cast the teen drama Over the Edge when they found Dillon cutting class at Hommocks Middle School in Larchmont. Dillon auditioned for a role and made his debut in the film. The film received a regional, limited theatrical release in May 1979, and grossed only slightly over $200,000. Dillon's performance was well-received, which led to his casting in two films released the following year: the teenage sex comedy Little Darlings, in which Kristy McNichol's character loses her virginity to a boy from the camp across the lake, played by Dillon, and the more serious teen dramedy My Bodyguard, where he played a high-school bully opposite Chris Makepeace. The films, released in March and July 1980, respectively, were box office successes and raised Dillon's profile among teen audiences.

Another of Dillon's early roles was in the Jean Shepherd PBS special The Great American Fourth of July and Other Disasters. The only available copies of this film are stored at UCLA, where a legal dispute makes it unavailable to the public. One of his next roles was in Liar's Moon, where he played Jack Duncan, a poor Texas boy madly in love with a rich banker's daughter.

He won the role of Dallas "Dally" Winston in Francis Ford Coppola's 1983 cinematic adaptation of S. E. Hinton's novel, The Outsiders, and shared the screen with an ensemble cast that included Tom Cruise, Emilio Estevez, Leif Garrett, C. Thomas Howell, Diane Lane, Rob Lowe, Ralph Macchio, and Patrick Swayze. He had previously appeared in another adaptation of one of Hinton's novels with Emilio Estevez, Tex (1982), and he and Diane Lane appeared in Coppola's second adaptation of a Hinton novel, Rumble Fish (1983). All three films were shot in Tulsa, Oklahoma, Hinton's hometown. He followed those up with The Flamingo Kid in 1984. He made his Broadway debut with the play The Boys of Winter in 1985. Dillon did voiceover work in the 1987 documentary film Dear America: Letters Home from Vietnam. In 1985, Dillon was namechecked in the lyrics of the Roger Daltrey song 'After The Fire' (written by Pete Townshend). In 1989, Dillon won critical acclaim for his performance as a drug addict in Gus Van Sant's Drugstore Cowboy.

Dillon continued to work in the early 1990s with roles in films like Singles (1992). He had a resurgence when he played Nicole Kidman's husband in To Die For (1995), as well as starring roles in Beautiful Girls (1996), In & Out (1997), Wild Things (1998) and There's Something About Mary (1998), for which he received an MTV Movie Award for Best Villain.

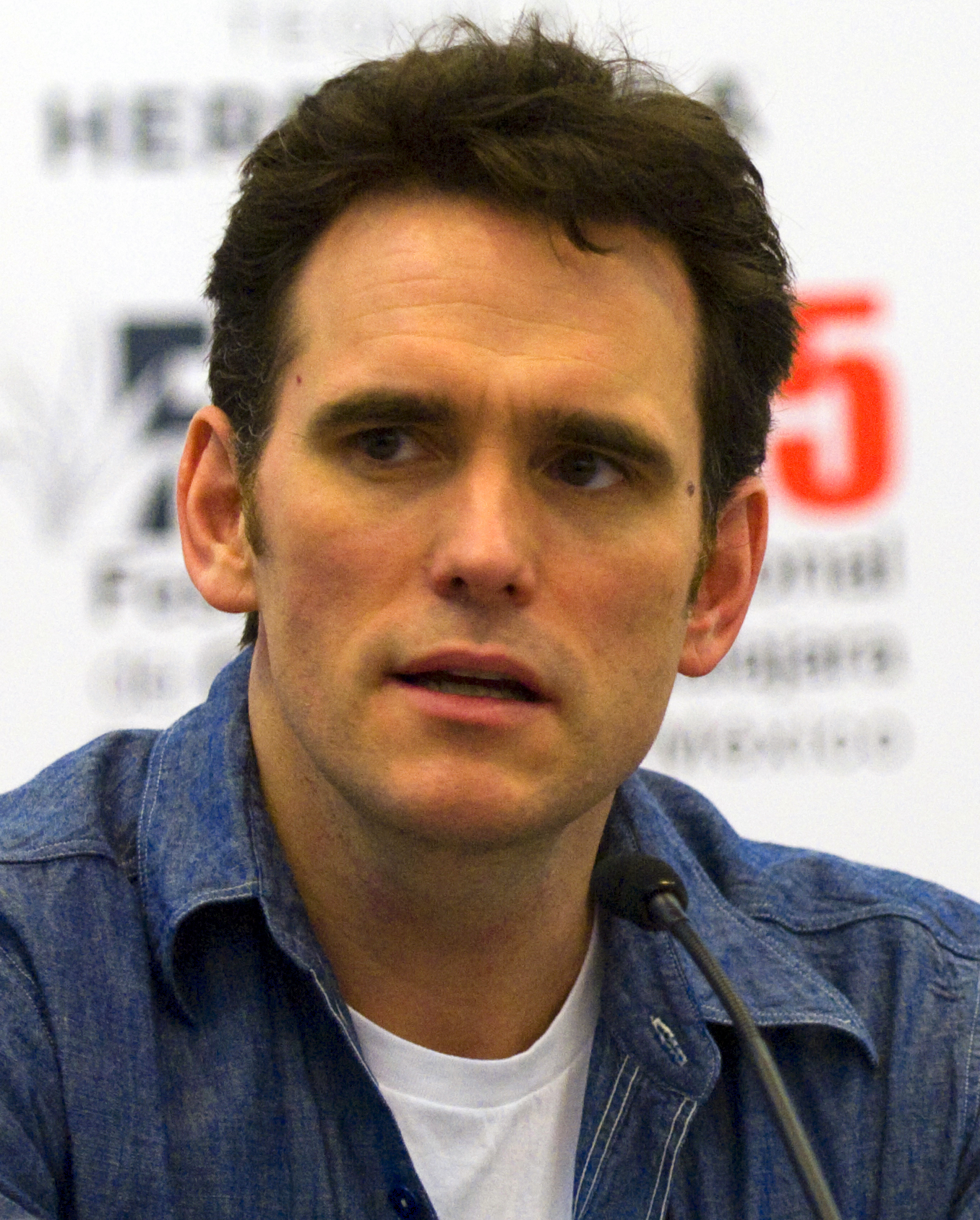
Dillon at the 2010 FICG

In 2002, he wrote and directed the film City of Ghosts, starring himself, James Caan and Gérard Depardieu. In 2005, he starred in Factotum, a film adaptation of an autobiographical work by Charles Bukowski. The same year he received critical praise and earned Best Supporting Actor Golden Globe and Academy Award nominations for his role in Crash, a film co-written and directed by Paul Haggis. In 2005, Dillon co-starred in Disney's Herbie: Fully Loaded and on March 11, 2006, hosted Saturday Night Live, in which he impersonated Greg Anderson and Rod Serling in sketches.

Dillon starred in the comedy You, Me and Dupree, opposite Kate Hudson and Owen Wilson. The film opened on July 14, 2006. On September 29, 2006, Dillon was honored with the Premio Donostia prize in the San Sebastián International Film Festival.

Dillon contributed his voice as the narrator, Sal Paradise, in an audiobook version of Jack Kerouac's novel On the Road. In 2006, he narrated Once in a Lifetime: The Extraordinary Story of the New York Cosmos.

Dillon appeared in several music videos during his career. He made a cameo appearance as a detective in Madonna's Bad Girl music video which also stars Christopher Walken. Dillon appeared in 1987 in the music video for "Fairytale of New York" by the Irish folk-punk band The Pogues, playing a cop who escorts lead singer Shane MacGowan into the "drunk tank". In 2007, the band Dinosaur Jr. hired Dillon to direct the video for their single "Been There All The Time" from the album Beyond. That year, he guest-starred on The Simpsons episode "Midnight Towboy". Early in 2015, he played the role of a Secret Service agent in the FOX 10-episode series Wayward Pines.

In 2018, Dillon played the lead role in the Lars von Trier thriller The House That Jack Built. In 2023, he was part of the ensemble cast in Wes Anderson's comedy Asteroid City. He portrayed Marlon Brando in the biopic about Maria Schneider Being Maria, which premiered at the 2024 Cannes Film Festival.

== Personal life ==
Dillon was in a relationship with Cameron Diaz from 1995 to 1998. From 2014 to 2023, he was in a relationship with Italian actress, dancer, and choreographer Roberta Mastromichele.

Dillon is an aficionado and collector of Latin music, with a large collection of vinyl, including a notable library of Cuban 78s.

== Filmography ==
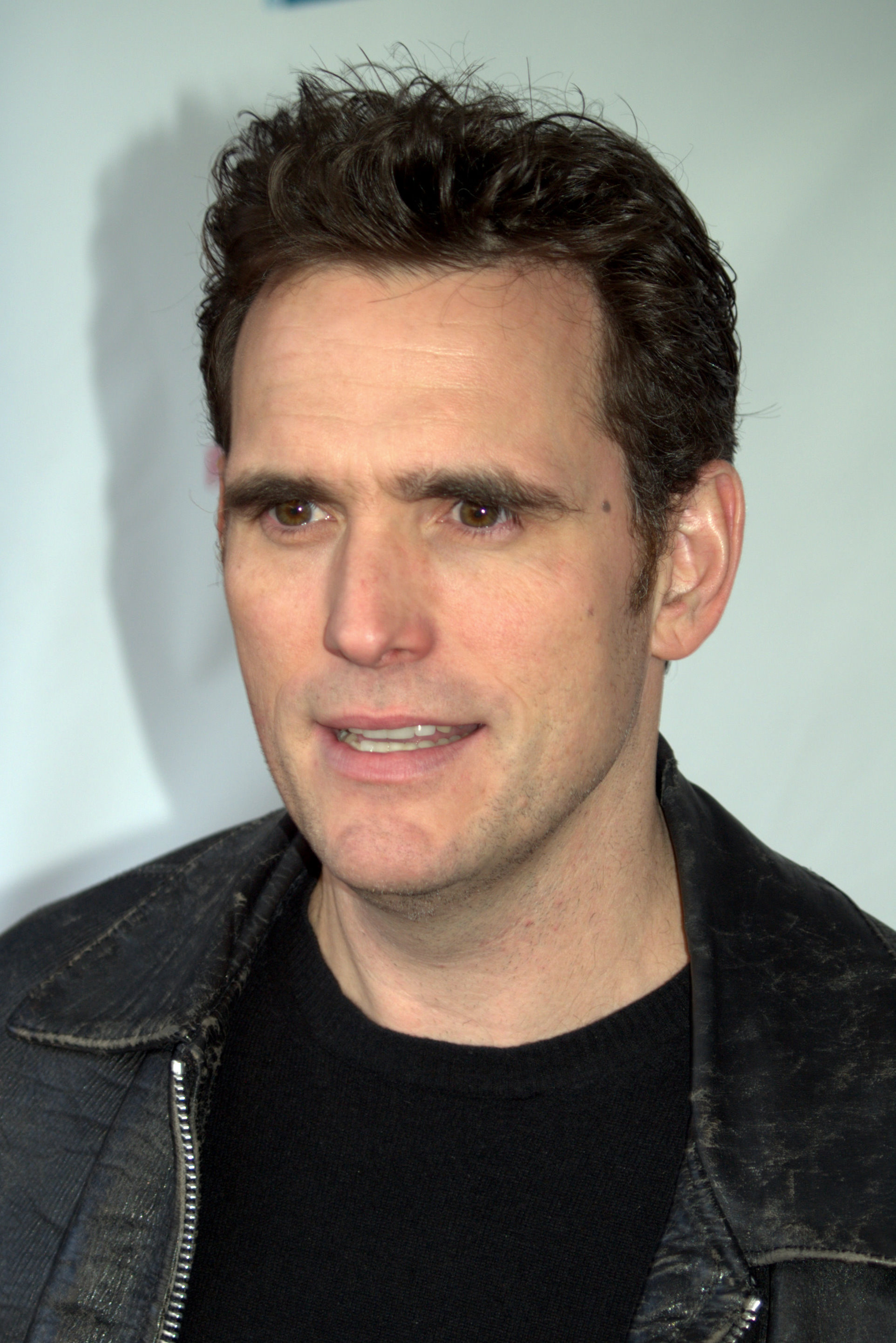
Dillon at the 2009 Tribeca Film Festival

=== Film ===
Year	Film	Role	Notes
1979	Over the Edge	Ritchie White	
1980	My Bodyguard	Melvin Moody	
1980	Little Darlings	Randy Adams	
1981	Liar's Moon	Jack Duncan	
1982	Tex	Tex McCormick	
1983	The Outsiders	Dallas "Dally" Winston	
1983	Rumble Fish	Rusty James	
1984	The Flamingo Kid	Jeffrey Willis	
1985	Target	Chris Lloyd / Derek Potter	
1985	Rebel	Sergeant Harry Rebel	
1986	Native Son	Jan Erlone	
1987	The Big Town	J. C. Cullen	
1988	Kansas	Doyle Kennedy	
1989	Drugstore Cowboy	Bob Hughes	
1989	Bloodhounds of Broadway	Regret	
1991	A Kiss Before Dying	Jonathan Corliss	
1992	Singles	Cliff Poncier	
1993	The Saint of Fort Washington	Matthew	
1993	Mr. Wonderful	Gus DeMarco	
1994	Golden Gate	Kevin Walker	
1995	To Die For	Larry Maretto	
1995	Frankie Starlight	Terry Klout	
1996	Grace of My Heart	Jay Phillips	
1996	Albino Alligator	Dova	
1996	Beautiful Girls	Tommy "Birdman" Rowland	
1997	In & Out	Cameron Drake	
1998	There's Something About Mary	Patrick "Pat" Healy	
1998	Wild Things	Sam Lombardo	
2001	One Night at McCool's	Randy	
2002	Deuces Wild	Fritzy Zennetti	
2002	City of Ghosts	Jimmy Cremming	Also writer and director
2003	Abby Singer	Himself	
2003	Rockets Redglare!	Himself	Documentary
2004	Employee of the Month	David Walsh	
2004	Crash	Officer John Ryan	
2005	Loverboy	Mark	
2005	Factotum	Henry Chinaski	
2005	Herbie: Fully Loaded	Trip Murphy	
2006	You, Me and Dupree	Carl Peterson	
2006	...So Goes the Nation	Himself	Documentary
2007	Joe Strummer: The Future Is Unwritten	Himself	Documentary
2008	Nothing but the Truth	Patton Dubois	
2009	Old Dogs	Barry	
2009	Armored	Mike Cochrane	
2010	Takers	Det. Jack Welles	
2010	In Search of Ted Demme	Himself	Documentary
2012	Girl Most Likely	George / The Bousche	
2013	Pawn Shop Chronicles	Richard	
2013	The Art of the Steal	Nicky Calhoun	
2013	Sunlight Jr.	Richie Barnes	
2014	Bad Country	Jesse Weiland	
2017	Rock Dog	Trey	Voice
2017	The Man Who Built Cambodia	Narrator	Voice; Short film
2017	Going in Style	Hamer	
2018	The House That Jack Built	Jack	
2018	Running for Grace	Doc	
2018	Head Full of Honey	Nick	
2019	Nimic	Father	Short film
2019	Proxima	Mike Shannon	
2020	Capone	Johnny	
2020	The Great Fellove	—N/a	Documentary; Director and executive producer
2020	Roy's World: Barry Gifford's Chicago	Narrator	Voice; Documentary
2021	Land of Dreams	Alan	
2021	Freakscene: The Story of Dinosaur Jr.	Narrator	Voice; Documentary
2022	American Dreamer	Dell	
2023	Asteroid City	Walter Geronimo	
2024	Being Maria	Marlon Brando	
2024	Haunted Heart	Max	
2025	The Fence	Horn	
2026	I Play Rocky	Frank Stallone Sr.	

=== Television ===
Year	Film	Role	Notes
1982	The Great American Fourth of July and Other Disasters	Ralph Parker	Television film
1991	Fishing with John	Himself	Miniseries; Episode 3
1991	Women & Men 2	Eddie Megeffin	Television film; Segment: "Return to Kansas City"
1999	Oz	—N/a	Director; Episode: "Napoleon's Boney Parts"
2006	Saturday Night Live	Himself	Host; Episode: "Matt Dillon/Arctic Monkeys"
2007	The Simpsons	Louie	Voice; Episode: "Midnight Towboy"
2011	Modern Family	Robbie Sullivan	Episode: "Princess Party"
2015	Wayward Pines	Ethan Burke	Main role (season 1)
2023	High Desert	Denny	Main role
TBA	The Magnificent Seven †	Chris Adams	Lead role

=== Music videos ===
Year	Title	Artist	Notes
1987	"Fairytale of New York"	The Pogues	
1989	"Shirlee"	Unity 2	Director
1993	"Bad Girl"	Madonna	
2007	"Been There All the Time"	Dinosaur Jr.	Director

== Awards and nominations ==
Year	Award	Nominated work	Result
1981	Young Artist Award Best Young Actor in a Major Motion Picture	My Bodyguard	Nominated
1983	Young Artist Award Best Young Motion Picture Actor	Tex	Nominated
1990	Independent Spirit Award for Best Male Lead	Drugstore Cowboy	Won
1999	Blockbuster Entertainment Awards Favorite Supporting Actor – Comedy	There's Something About Mary	Won
1999	MTV Movie Award for Best Villain (tied with Stephen Dorff)	There's Something About Mary	Won
1999	Teen Choice Award Funniest Scene	There's Something About Mary	Won
1999	MTV Movie Award for Best Kiss (shared with Denise Richards & Neve Campbell)	Wild Things	Nominated
2001	Grammy Award for Best Spoken Word Album	On the Road by Jack Kerouac, audiobook	Nominated
2005	Gotham Tribute Award		Won
2005	Dallas-Fort Worth Film Critics Association Awards Best Supporting Actor	Crash	Won
2005	Gotham Independent Film Award for Best Ensemble Cast	Crash	Nominated
2005	Las Vegas Film Critics Society Awards Best Supporting Actor	Crash	Won
2005	Hollywood Film Festival Ensemble of the Year	Crash	Won
2005	Satellite Award for Best Cast – Motion Picture	Crash	Won
2005	Phoenix Film Critics Society Award Best Cast	Crash	Won
2005	Washington D.C. Area Film Critics Association Best Cast	Crash	Won
2005	Washington D.C. Area Film Critics Association Best Supporting Actor	Crash	Nominated
2006	Academy Award for Best Supporting Actor	Crash	Nominated
2006	BAFTA Award for Best Actor in a Supporting Role	Crash	Nominated
2006	Black Reel Award for Best Ensemble	Crash	Nominated
2006	Broadcast Film Critics Association Award for Best Supporting Actor	Crash	Nominated
2006	Broadcast Film Critics Association Award for Best Acting Ensemble	Crash	Won
2006	Chicago Film Critics Association Award Best Supporting Actor	Crash	Nominated
2006	Empire Award for Best Actor	Crash	Nominated
2006	Golden Globe Award for Best Supporting Actor – Motion Picture	Crash	Nominated
2006	Independent Spirit Award for Best Supporting Male	Crash	Won
2006	Online Film Critics Society Award for Best Supporting Actor	Crash	Nominated
2006	SAG Award for Outstanding Performance by a Male Actor in a Supporting Role	Crash	Nominated
2006	SAG Award for Outstanding Performance by a Cast in a Motion Picture	Crash	Won
2006	San Sebastián International Film Festival Donostia Lifetime Achievement Award	—N/a	Honored
2007	Cairo International Film Festival Special Award	—N/a	Honored
2011	Special Tomislav Pinter Award	—N/a	Honored
2016	Saturn Award for Best Actor on Television	Wayward Pines	Nominated
2019	Robert Award for Best Actor in a Leading Role	The House That Jack Built	Nominated
2019	Bodil Award for Best Actor in a Leading Role	The House That Jack Built	Nominated
2022	75th Locarno Film Festival: Leopard of Honour	—N/a	Honored
