= Rumble Fish =

1983 film directed by Francis Ford Coppola

- Theatrical release poster by John Solie
- Directed by: Francis Ford Coppola
- Screenplay by: S. E. Hinton; Francis Ford Coppola
- Based on: Rumble Fish by S. E. Hinton
- Produced by: Doug Claybourne; Fred Roos
- Starring: Matt Dillon; Mickey Rourke; Vincent Spano; Diane Lane; Diana Scarwid; Nicolas Cage; Dennis Hopper
- Cinematography: Stephen H. Burum
- Edited by: Barry Malkin
- Music by: Stewart Copeland
- Production company: Zoetrope Studios
- Distributed by: Universal Pictures
- Release date: October 21, 1983
- Running time: 94 minutes
- Country: United States
- Language: English
- Budget: $10 million
- Box office: $2,494,480

Rumble Fish is a 1983 American teen drama noir film directed by Francis Ford Coppola. It is based on the 1975 novel Rumble Fish by S. E. Hinton, who also co-wrote the screenplay with Coppola. The film stars Matt Dillon, Mickey Rourke, Vincent Spano, Diane Lane, Diana Scarwid, Nicolas Cage, Laurence Fishburne, Chris Penn, and Dennis Hopper.

The film centers on the relationship between a character called the Motorcycle Boy (Rourke), a revered former gang leader wishing to live a more peaceful life, and his younger brother, Rusty James (Dillon), a teenaged hoodlum who aspires to become as feared as his brother.

Coppola wrote the screenplay for the film with Hinton on his days off from shooting The Outsiders. He made the films back-to-back, retaining much of the same cast and crew, particularly Matt Dillon and Diane Lane. Rumble Fish is dedicated to Coppola's brother August.

Rumble Fish was released by Universal Pictures on October 21, 1983. The film received positive reviews from critics, but was a box-office disaster, with its widest release earning a total of $2.5 million against an estimated budget of $10 million. It is notable for its avant-garde style with a film noir feel, shot on stark high-contrast black-and-white film, using the spherical cinematographic process with allusions to French New Wave cinema and German Expressionism. Rumble Fish features an experimental score by Stewart Copeland, drummer of the musical group the Police, who used a Musync, a new device at the time. The film has now become a cult classic over time.

== Plot ==
In Tulsa, Oklahoma, Rusty James is the younger brother of "The Motorcycle Boy", a legendary figure amongst the European-American gangs in the area who brokered peace between them. The Motorcycle Boy has been missing for two months, leaving the gangs to start to dissolve as heroin takes over the streets, while Rusty James tries to live up to his reputation.

Rusty James fights a rival gang leader and gets the upper hand, but is distracted by the Motorcycle Boy's return, causing him to be wounded. The Motorcycle Boy runs the man down with his cycle before nursing Rusty James back to health. Rusty James's awkward, nerdy friend Steve helps the Motorcycle Boy, but is wary due to his rumored insanity similar to that of his long-absent mother. The brothers spend time with their impoverished, alcoholic father, who notes that the Motorcycle Boy takes after his mother.

Rusty James quits school after his fighting gets him suspended and cheats on his girlfriend Patty at a party hosted by his friend Smokey. She breaks up with him and Smokey accosts her, making Rusty James realize that the party was set up so Smokey could take advantage of the situation and date her. Steve and the brothers go drinking and the Motorcycle Boy mentions that he found his mother dating a television producer while out in California and laments not getting to see the Pacific Ocean. Steve and Rusty James are mugged as they leave a bar, and Rusty James is beaten to the point where he has a brief out-of-body experience. The Motorcycle Boy saves them and tries to convince Rusty James to leave the gang life, but Steve decries him as insane, which Rusty James starts to believe.

Rusty James finds the Motorcycle Boy in a pet store, where he is taken with the Siamese fighting fish (which he dubs "rumble fish" and are the only element of color in the film, as the Motorcycle Boy is colorblind). Patterson, a police officer who hates the Motorcycle Boy, regards them with suspicion. Rusty James's father tells him that the Motorcycle Boy and their mother are people with an "acute perception" rather than crazy.

The brothers ride back to the pet store, where the Motorcycle Boy sets the animals loose while Rusty James fails to convince him to return to gang life. As the Motorcycle Boy asks him to take his cycle to the Pacific and hurries to a nearby river to drop the fighting fish, he is shot dead by a patrolling Patterson. Rusty James takes the fish and finishes carrying them to the river.

== Cast ==
- Matt Dillon as Rusty James
- Mickey Rourke as The Motorcycle Boy
- Diane Lane as Patty
- Dennis Hopper as Father
- Diana Scarwid as Cassandra
- Vincent Spano as Steve
- Nicolas Cage as "Smokey"
- Chris Penn as B.J. Jackson
- Larry Fishburne as "Midget"
- William Smith as Patterson the Cop
- Tracey Walter as Alley Mugger
- Glenn Withrow as Biff Wilcox
- Tom Waits as Benny
- Michael Higgins as Mr. Harrigan
- Sofia Coppola as Donna, Patty's Sister (billed as "Domino")
- S. E. Hinton as Hooker on Strip (cameo)

== Production ==
=== Development and writing ===
Francis Ford Coppola was drawn to S. E. Hinton's novel Rumble Fish because of the strong personal identification he had with the subject matter — a younger brother who hero-worships an older, intellectually superior brother, which mirrored the relationship between Coppola and his brother, August. A dedication to August appears as the film's final end credit. The director said that he "started to use Rumble Fish as my carrot for what I promised myself when I finished The Outsiders". Halfway through the production of The Outsiders, Coppola decided that he wanted to retain the same production team, stay in Tulsa, and shoot Rumble Fish right after The Outsiders. He wrote the screenplay for Rumble Fish with Hinton on Sundays, their day off from shooting The Outsiders.

=== Pre-production ===
Warner Bros. was not happy with an early cut of The Outsiders and passed on distributing Rumble Fish. Despite the lack of financing, Coppola recorded the film on video, in its entirety, during two weeks of rehearsals in a former school gymnasium and afterwards was able to show the cast and crew a rough draft of the film. To get Rourke into the mindset of his character, Coppola gave him books written by Albert Camus and a biography of Napoleon. The Motorcycle Boy's look was patterned after Camus complete with trademark cigarette dangling out of the corner of his mouth — taken from a photograph of the author that Rourke used as a visual handle. Rourke remembers that he approached his character as "an actor who no longer finds his work interesting".

Coppola hired Michael Smuin, a choreographer and co-director of the San Francisco Ballet, to stage the fight scene between Rusty James and Biff Wilcox because he liked the way he choreographed violence. He asked Smuin to include specific visual elements: a motorcycle, broken glass, knives, gushing water and blood. The choreographer spent a week designing the sequence. Smuin also staged the street dance between Rourke and Diana Scarwid, modeling it after one in Picnic featuring William Holden and Kim Novak.

Before filming started, Coppola ran regular screenings of old films during the evenings to familiarize the cast, and in particular the crew, with his visual concept for Rumble Fish. Most notably, Coppola showed Anatole Litvak's Decision Before Dawn, the inspiration for the film's smoky look, F. W. Murnau's The Last Laugh to show Matt Dillon how silent actor Emil Jannings used body language to convey emotions, and Robert Wiene's The Cabinet of Dr. Caligari, which became Rumble Fish's "stylistic prototype". Coppola's extensive use of shadows, oblique angles, exaggerated compositions, and an abundance of smoke and fog are all hallmarks of these German Expressionist films. Godfrey Reggio's Koyaanisqatsi, shot mainly in time-lapse photography, motivated Coppola to use this technique to animate the sky in his own film.

=== Filming ===
Six weeks into production, Coppola made a deal with Universal Studios and principal photography began on July 12, 1982, with the director declaring, "Rumble Fish will be to The Outsiders what Apocalypse Now was to The Godfather." He shot in deserted areas at the edge of Tulsa with many scenes captured via a hand-held camera in order to make the audience feel uneasy. He also had shadows painted on the walls of the sets to make them look ominous. In the dream sequence where Rusty James floats outside of his body Matt Dillon wore a body mold which was moved by an articulated arm and also flown on wires.

To mix the black-and-white footage of Rusty James and the Motorcycle Boy in the pet store looking at the Siamese fighting fish in color, Burum shot the actors in black and white and then projected that footage on a rear projection screen. They put the fish tank in front of it with the tropical fish and shot it all with color film. Filming finished by mid-September 1982, on schedule and on budget.

The film is notable for its avant-garde style, shot on stark high-contrast black-and-white film, using the spherical cinematographic process with allusions to French New Wave cinema. The striking black-and-white photography of the film's cinematographer, Stephen H. Burum, lies in two main sources: the films of Orson Welles and German cinema of the 1920s. When the film was in its pre-production phase, Coppola asked Burum how he wanted to film it and they agreed that it might be the only chance they were ever going to have to make a black-and-white film.

== Music ==
=== Soundtrack ===
Rumble Fish: Original Motion Picture Soundtrack

Soundtrack album by Stewart Copeland
- Released: November 8, 1983
- Recorded: 1983
- Genre: Soundtrack
- Length: 43:08
- Label: A&M
- Producer: Stewart Copeland

Stewart Copeland chronology
Klark Kent (as Klark Kent) (1980)	Rumble Fish: Original Motion Picture Soundtrack (1983)	The Rhythmatist (1985)

Singles from Rumble Fish (Original Motion Picture Soundtrack)
- 1. "Don't Box Me In" Released: 1983

Coppola envisioned a largely experimental score to complement his images. He began to devise a mainly percussive soundtrack to symbolize the idea of time running out. As Coppola worked on it, he realized that he needed help from a professional musician. He asked Stewart Copeland, then drummer of the musical group The Police, to improvise a rhythm track. Coppola soon concluded that Copeland was a far superior composer and let him take over. Copeland recorded street sounds of Tulsa and mixed them into the soundtrack with the use of Musync—a music and tempo editing hardware and software system invented by Robert Randles (subsequently nominated for an Oscar for Scientific Achievement), to modify the tempo of his compositions and synchronize them with the action in the film.

An edited version of the song "Don't Box Me In", a collaboration between Copeland and singer/songwriter Stan Ridgway, was released as a single and enjoyed significant radio airplay.

All songs written by Stewart Copeland, except where noted.

1. "Don't Box Me In" (Copeland, Stan Ridgway) – 4:40
2. "Tulsa Tango" – 3:42
3. "Our Mother Is Alive" – 4:16
4. "Party at Someone Else's Place" – 2:25
5. "Biff Gets Stomped by Rusty James" – 2:27
6. "Brothers on Wheels" – 4:20
7. "West Tulsa Story" – 3:59
8. "Tulsa Rags" – 1:39
9. "Father on the Stairs" – 3:01
10. "Hostile Bridge to Benny's" – 1:53
11. "Your Mother Is Not Crazy" – 2:48
12. "Personal Midget/Cain's Ballroom" – 5:55
13. "Motorboy's Fate" – 2:03

== Differences from the novel ==
Coppola did not employ the flashback structure of the novel. He also removed a few passages from the novel that further established Steve and Rusty James' relationship in order to focus more on the brothers' relationship.

- In the novel, Rusty James and the motorcycle boy are three years younger than they are portrayed in the film. In the novel, the Motorcycle Boy is only 17 whereas in the film, he is 21.
- In the film, the Motorcycle Boy is more attentive and paternal toward Rusty James than he is in the novel.
- In the novel, Rusty James uses a bike chain to disarm Biff, whereas in the film he uses a sweater.
- In the novel Biff slashes Rusty James with a knife rather than a pane of glass and Motorcycle Boy breaks Biff's wrist instead of ramming him with his motorcycle.
- The Motorcycle Boy's self-destructive behavior at the film's conclusion is less motivated in the film than in the novel.
- In the novel, Rusty James gets arrested after Motorcycle Boy is shot and never makes the promise to ride the motorcycle.
- The film ends with Rusty James arriving at the ocean on a motorcycle while the novel ends with Rusty James meeting Steve in California five years after Motorcycle Boy's death.

== Themes ==
The theme of time passing faster than the characters realize is conveyed through time-lapse photography of clouds racing across the sky and numerous shots of clocks. The black-and-white photography was meant to convey the Motorcycle Boy's color blindness while also evoking film noir through frequent use of oblique angles, exaggerated compositions, dark alleys, and foggy streets.

== Release ==
=== Theatrical ===
Coppola used many new filmmaking techniques never before used in the production of a commercial motion picture, and the film was well received on the independent circuit. At the San Sebastián International Film Festival, it won the International Critics' Big Award. At its world premiere at the New York Film Festival however, there were several walkouts and at the end of the screening, boos and catcalls. Former head of production at Paramount Pictures Michael Daly remembers legendary producer Robert Evans' reaction to Coppola's film, "Evans went to see Rumble Fish, and he remembers being shaken by how far Coppola had strayed from Hollywood. Evans says, 'I was scared. I couldn't understand any of it.'"

=== Home media ===
The film was first released on VHS in 1984 and on DVD on September 9, 1998, with no extra material. A special edition was released on September 13, 2005, with an audio commentary by Coppola, six deleted scenes, a making-of featurette, a look at how Copeland's score was created and the "Don't Box Me In" music video. In August 2012, The Masters of Cinema Series released a special Blu-ray edition of the film (and accompanying Steelbook edition) in the UK. In April 2017, the Criterion Collection released the film on Blu-ray and DVD. Chuck Bowen, in a review of the Blu-ray edition, referred to Rumble Fish as one "of Francis Ford Coppola's most underrated and deeply felt films." He suggests that with the Blu-ray edition, it "receives a gorgeously ephemeral restoration that should hopefully jump-start its reevaluation as an essential American work."

== Reception ==
=== Box office ===
Rumble Fish was released on October 8, 1983, and it only grossed $18,985 on its opening weekend, playing in one theater. Its widest release was in 296 theaters and it was a box office disaster, grossing only $2.5 million domestically. Its estimated budget was $10 million, a large sum for the time.

=== Critical response ===
Jay Scott wrote for The Globe and Mail, "Francis Coppola, bless his theatrical soul, may have the commercial sense of a newt, but he has the heart of a revolutionary, and the talent of a great artist." Jack Kroll in his review for Newsweek stated: "Rumble Fish is a brilliant tone poem ... Rourke's Motorcycle Boy is really a young god with a mortal wound, a slippery assignment Rourke handles with a fierce delicacy.". David Thomson has written that Rumble Fish is "maybe the most satisfying film Coppola made after Apocalypse Now". Sofia Coppola named it as her favorite among her father's movies in an interview with The Guardian. She voted for the film in the 2022 Sight and Sound director's poll of the greatest films of all time. Coppola himself has variously called it his favorite of his own movies and as among his three favorites, saying it "was the film I really wanted to make".

Film critic Roger Ebert gave the film three-and-a-half out of four stars and wrote, "I thought Rumble Fish was offbeat, daring, and utterly original. Who but Coppola could make this film? And, of course, who but Coppola would want to?" In her review for The New York Times, Janet Maslin wrote that "the film is so furiously overloaded, so crammed with extravagant touches, that any hint of a central thread is obscured". Gary Arnold in The Washington Post wrote, "It's virtually impossible to be drawn into the characters' identities and conflicts at even an introductory, rudimentary level, and the rackety distraction of an obtrusive experimental score ... frequently makes it impossible to comprehend mere dialogue". Time magazine's Richard Corliss wrote, "In one sense, then, Rumble Fish is Coppola's professional suicide note to the movie industry, a warning against employing him to find the golden gross. No doubt: this is his most baroque and self-indulgent film. It may also be his bravest." David Denby in New York and Andrew Sarris in The Village Voice gave the film harsh reviews.

Rumble Fish earned 77% based on 39 reviews at Rotten Tomatoes. The site's consensus states: "Rumble Fish frustrates even as it intrigues, but director Francis Ford Coppola's strong visual style helps compensate for a certain narrative stasis." The film has a weighted average score of 63/100 on Metacritic, indicating "generally favorable reviews".

=== Accolades ===
Rumble Fish won the highest prize in the 32nd San Sebastián International Film Festival, the International Critics' Big Award.
