= Hawkes Harbor =

2004 novel by S. E. Hinton

- First edition (publ. Tor Books)
- Author: S. E. Hinton
- Publisher: Tor Books
- Publication date: September 1, 2004
- ISBN: 0-7653-0563-1

Hawkes Harbor is a 2004 novel by American writer S. E. Hinton.

== Plot summary ==
Orphaned and illegitimate, Jamie Sommers grows up believing he has "no hope of heaven", that he is doomed to a dreadful existence. A Roman Catholic, he is deeply depressed by the ideas of being conceived in adultery and born in sin. The impressionable Jamie is repeatedly told by nuns in the Bronx that he is destined to repeat the sins of his parents, and he proves them right.

Taking to the sea, Jamie seeks out danger and adventure in exotic ports all over the world as a smuggler, gunrunner, and murderer. For Jamie, life became a constant struggle in his search for excitement and fulfillment. Jamie harbored a belief he didn't deserve a better life than he has, leading to him choosing to worsen himself. He then proceeds to survive foreign prisons, pirates, and a shark attack.

But in a quiet seaside town in Delaware, Jamie discovers something that pushes him over the edge mentally and changes his life forever. After being taken out of a mental institution life gets harder. Trying to deal with the townspeople who want him hurt and taking his medicine, all the while having to deal with his master. He starts to find himself when he switches medicines and Grenville takes him on a cruise.
