= The Puppy Sister =

1995 children's novella by S. E. Hinton

- First edition cover
- Author: S. E. Hinton
- Illustrator: Jacqueline Rogers
- Publisher: Delacorte Books
- Publication date: September 1, 1995
- ISBN: 0-385-32060-4

The Puppy Sister is a 1995 children's novella written by American writer S. E. Hinton and illustrated by Jacqueline Rogers. The story revolves around Aleasha, a tricolor Australian Shepherd puppy who realises that the only way to really feel like a member of her new family is to become human. Aleasha begins a gradual, physical transformation from puppy to human child, trying to get used to both her new outward appearance as well as the struggle to actually feel more human. The story is based on her real life dog (Aleasha) and son's (Nick) relationship.

A graphic novel based on this story was published in 2010.

== Plot summary ==
The Davidson family adopts Aleasha, a black, white, and tan colored Australian shepherd puppy from a farm. Aleasha loves her new family and really feels happy playing with their young son, Nick though he is not very thrilled about the new dog since he would rather have a little brother or sister.

One day after returning from the vet's office, Aleasha sees herself in the mirror and realises that she is not an actual human member of the family, but a puppy. She decides to physically transform into a human girl so she can fit in better with the Davidsons.

Aleasha begins by practicing walking on her hind legs and trying to speak. She eventually manages to walk across the kitchen on two legs, but has trouble forming words due to the still canine shape of her mouth. One day, she surprises Nick by saying his name to him. He also discovers subtle changes in Aleasha's physical appearance—her ears are shorter and her muzzle is shrinking. Nick decides to keep this a secret until a later day.

One day, Nick surprises his mother by showing her and Dad Aleasha's new verbal skills. Mom and Dad Davidson are amazed with Aleasha, but accept her changes. In the meantime, they decide to keep Aleasha away from the outside world until she completes her transformation. To cover up for the soon-to-be absent dog, the Davidsons begin telling people that they gave away their puppy and plan to adopt a little girl.

As time passes, Aleasha begins to struggle with her shift from canine to human. She eats meals with the family, but dislikes eating vegetables (until Mom tricks her by dropping stir-fry ingredients on the floor, knowing Aleasha's dog instincts would cause her to eat the food as it fell). When Aleasha is allowed to go trick or treating on Halloween, disguised as a werewolf like Nick, she gives in to her canine side by howling in fear upon being spooked by a man pretending to be a scarecrow at one house. At the same time, Aleasha is beginning to look like less like a dog and more like a furry child, leaving her in a very awkward halfway point through her transformation. By Christmas, Aleasha begins to gain more human abilities such as color vision. However, she is also no longer able to communicate with the family cat, Miss Kitty, as Aleasha's ears are now more human than animal.

By the spring season, Aleasha has finished her physical change and is now a seven-year-old girl with black hair and yellow-colored eyes. However, she still possesses some canine instinct. At a baseball game with dad and Nick, she catches a foul ball with her teeth. Few physical hints of her past canine form are also apparent—Aleasha will always have pointy teeth and ears, as well as very strong toes. However, she learns that no one ever completes changing throughout life, and also keeps one secret from her family—Aleasha can still smell love.

== Publication details ==
- Hinton, Susan (1995). The Puppy Sister. New York: Susan Eloise Hinton.
