= Tex (film) =

1982 film by Tim Hunter

- Theatrical release poster
- Directed by: Tim Hunter
- Screenplay by: Charles S. Haas; Tim Hunter
- Based on: Tex by S. E. Hinton
- Produced by: Tim Zinnemann
- Starring: Matt Dillon; Jim Metzler; Meg Tilly; Bill McKinney; Ben Johnson
- Cinematography: Ric Waite
- Edited by: Howard E. Smith
- Music by: Pino Donaggio
- Production company: Walt Disney Productions
- Distributed by: Buena Vista Distribution Company
- Release date: July 30, 1982
- Running time: 103 minutes
- Country: United States
- Language: English
- Budget: $5 million
- Box office: $7.4 million

Tex is a 1982 American coming-of-age drama film directed by Tim Hunter in his directorial debut, from a screenplay by Charles S. Haas and Hunter, based on S. E. Hinton's best-selling 1979 novel of the same name. It follows two teenage brothers in rural Oklahoma and their struggle to grow up after their mother's death and their father's departure. The film stars Matt Dillon in the title role, with Jim Metzler, Meg Tilly, Emilio Estevez (in his film debut), Bill McKinney, Frances Lee McCain and Ben Johnson in supporting roles. Metzler was nominated for a Golden Globe Award for his performance.

Tex is seen as one of the earliest efforts for Walt Disney Productions to put mature content in its movies and received positive reviews for its realism and its content.

== Plot ==
Two brothers, Tex and Mason McCormick, struggle to make it on their own when their mother dies and their father leaves them in their Oklahoma home.

Fifteen-year-old Tex McCormick and his 17-year-old brother Mason are trying to make it on their own in the absence of their rodeo-riding father. Mason takes over running the household and, to make ends meet, sells Tex's beloved horse, Rowdy. Tex gets mad at Mason and heedlessly tumbles into scrape after scrape. When his Pop comes home, Tex is shocked to learn that he isn't his real father. But Tex realizes that Mason and Pop do love him, and it is time to start growing up.

== Cast ==
- Matt Dillon as Texas "Tex" McCormick
- Jim Metzler as Mason "Mace" McCormick
- Meg Tilly as Jamie Collins
- Bill McKinney as Pop McCormick
- Frances Lee McCain as Mrs. Johnson
- Ben Johnson as Cole Collins
- Phil Brock as Lem Peters
- Emilio Estevez as Johnny Collins
- Tom Virtue as Robert “Bob” Collins
- Jack Thibeau as Coach Jackson
- Željko Ivanek as Hitchhiker Mark Jennings
- Pamela Ludwig as Connie Peters
- S.E. Hinton as Mrs. Barnes

== Production ==
The film was given a PG-rating by the Motion Picture Association rather than a G-rating traditionally earned by Walt Disney Studios productions. The film was an effort by Disney to incorporate more mature subject matter into its films, after several failures making wholesome family films. Disney's vice president in charge of production, Thomas L. Wilhite, wanted new talent. Aware of this initiative, director Tim Hunter, thought that the novel Tex by S. E. Hinton would be a good fit. Hunter discovered the novel while doing research on his previous film Over The Edge (1979), which he co-wrote with his writing partner, Charlie Haas; the pair had discovered the works of Hinton and realized that teenagers were reading her novels.

Hunter brought the project to Disney and asked for the opportunity to direct it himself, but his sole directing credit was an independent film made ten years prior. Hunter said "I thought I had an honest shot to direct Tex. It was a small film, and I knew Matt Dillon was interested because I had met him on Over the Edge. I really felt it would be a long time before I found a piece of material that would present less risks for a studio if they wanted to let me direct.''

The film was edgy for Disney at the time, with scenes depicting marijuana and teenage sex; however they did not interfere with the script once the project was launched. Hunter also had to adapt to Disney's way of doing things and said "Disney's films have traditionally been made almost entirely with in-house people in all departments. On the other hand, I was more geared and I thought this material was more geared toward independent production. Eventually we put the film together with a mix of people from the outside and regular Disney people. That mixture ended up working really well, thanks largely to the producer, Tim Zinnemann.''

Unlike other Disney films, it was shot entirely on location in Oklahoma, the original setting of the novel, both in the towns of Bixby and Tulsa.

Initially, Hinton rejected the offer, as she had previously rejected all offers regarding film adaptation of her books. She said “When a Disney executive convinced me they weren’t going to make ‘Tex Meets the Seven Dwarfs,’ I got a little interested.”

She explained that “when I turned the rights to ‘Tex’ down, the next thing I knew I had a Disney executive on my doorstep pleading their cause. After bargaining with him a while, I said ‘I have a horse that’s perfect for the horse part.’ He said, ‘He’s got the part.’ And I said, ‘You’ve got the book.’" Regarding her horse she said “my horse Toyota plays Rowdy, Tex’s horse, in the movie. I had raised him from a colt. He responded to voice commands, he was a champion jumper and he loved the limelight. He just knew all the lights, cameras and on-lookers were for him. And he loved Matt Dillon.” Hinton also explained that at the time Dillon was inexperienced in regards to riding horses, so she had to train him.

== Reception ==
=== Critical response ===
On the review aggregator website Rotten Tomatoes, 85% of 13 critics' reviews are positive, with an average rating of 6.8/10. Metacritic, which uses a weighted average, assigned the film a score of 78 out of 100, based on 7 critics, indicating "generally favorable" reviews.

Janet Maslin of The New York Times lauded Tex as "an utterly disarming, believable portrait of a small-town adolescent" that "captures Miss Hinton's novel perfectly" and that would "make a star out of Matt Dillon" and "forever alter the way moviegoers think about Walt Disney pictures." Maslin concluded her review by stating, "This is a film that accomplishes everything that it attempts, and does so expertly. On its own terms, it is a success through and through."

Roger Ebert gave the film 4 stars out of 4 and noted that Hunter and Haas, as in their previous writing effort, the 1979 film Over the Edge, were "still remembering what it's like to be young, still getting the dialogue and the attitudes, the hang-ups and the dreams, exactly right." David Sterritt of The Christian Science Monitor called it "probably the best picture turned out by the Disney studio since the heyday of the legendary Walt himself." On the other hand, Variety wrote that "writers Charlie Haas and Tim Hunter (latter making his directing debut) seem intent on incorporating every conceivable adolescent and adult trauma into their script [from the novel by S.E. Hinton], thus leaving the film with a very overdone, contrived feeling."

== Accolades ==
| Year | Award | Category | Nominee | Result | Ref. |
|---|---|---|---|---|---|
| 1982 | 4th Youth in Film Awards | Best Young Motion Picture Actor | Matt Dillon | Nominated | |
| 1982 | 4th Youth in Film Awards | Best Family Motion Picture | Tex | Nominated | |
| 1983 | 40th Golden Globe Awards | Best Supporting Actor | Jim Metzler | Nominated | |

== Home video release ==
Tex was released by Walt Disney Home Video through VHS on April 18, 1983.

The film was released on DVD by Walt Disney Home Entertainment on September 7, 2004.
