= That Was Then, This Is Now =

1971 young adult novel by S. E. Hinton

- First edition cover, 1971
- Author: S.E. Hinton
- Language: English
- Genre: Young adult fiction
- Publisher: Viking/Penguin (hardcover), Dell Publishing, Laurel Leaf Library (paperback)
- Publication date: 1971
- Publication place: United States
- Media type: Print (hardcover, paperback), Audiobook (audiocassettes)
- Pages: 159pp
- ISBN: 4-400-86520-7
- Preceded by: The Outsiders
- Followed by: Rumble Fish

That Was Then, This Is Now is a young adult novel by S. E. Hinton, first published in 1971. It is a coming-of-age story about the changing relationship between two foster brothers, Mark and Bryon, who are close. When Mark starts selling drugs, Bryon must decide whether to report him to the police. The book was later adapted into a 1985 film starring Emilio Estevez and Craig Sheffer.

== Plot ==
In 1960s Tulsa, Oklahoma Mark and Bryon live together as brothers since the death of Mark's parents. The two spend time hanging out at the local bar and playing pool to earn money, along with a strange boy named M&M. The novel begins with Bryon's mother in the hospital getting surgery, which causes financial stress for the family. The boys are forced to look for jobs, but do not have much success. Bryon asks the bartender, Charlie, for a job but is refused because he is underage. The financial strife at home grows worse and Bryon's mother is hospitalized again. Mark begins bringing home suspicious amounts of money, but does not tell Bryon where the money is coming from.

Bryon starts dating a girl named Cathy, who is M&M's sister. The pair attend a dance together, where Mark and Ponyboy Curtis get in a fight with a boy who Bryon's ex-girlfriend, Angela, told to beat the two up. Mark is injured on his head and gets stitches.

Mark and Bryon decide they need money. They go to Charlie's bar and play pool and they beat two Texans. Outside the bar the two Texans approach the boys in an alleyway and threaten them with a gun. Charlie comes out and is shot and killed while saving the boys.

Over the next few months Bryon spirals as he ponders Charlie's death. Cathy tells Bryon about her suspicion that M&M is doing drugs. The pair pick up M&M as well as Mark, and go out to eat. While driving back, M&M requests to be dropped off at a specific location. Once out of the car, he says he's not coming home. Cathy resists, but Bryon assures her it is fine and they drive away, in hopes of coming back for him. Once back, they find M&M is gone.

For the next few weeks, Cathy and Bryon stress about M&M's disappearance. Bryon breaks down in tears after a night of drinking with Mark. Mark claims to know where M&M is, to which Bryon expresses hope. The next day, Mark takes Bryon to a “hippie house,” where he is known as Cat. The residents of the house claim to not have seen M&M for a few days, and the pair leave the house.

Previously, Bryon and Mark had picked up Angela, and while she was sleeping, Mark cut all her hair off as revenge for almost getting him killed. Tim and Curly Shepard, Angela's brothers, beat up Bryon since they think he is the one who has done this. Cathy visits Bryon, and he tells her about the house. Bryon drives Cathy to the house in order to find M&M. They find him while he is high; he yells and cries out frantically. After taking him to the hospital, the doctor says he may never return to how he was.

After Bryon returns home, he finds a bottle of pills under Mark's mattress. He comes to the conclusion that Mark is selling the drugs in order to make money. He calls the police, and confronts Mark, getting Mark arrested.

Over the next few months, Bryon continues to spiral. He and Cathy break up. Mark is now in a reformatory. Without anyone in his life, Bryon regrets his past actions, including turning in Mark. He ponders about a life in which things were different, and wishes he was a kid again.

== Connections to other books by S.E. Hinton ==
The book, like Rumble Fish, takes place in Tulsa, Oklahoma, Hinton's hometown and the setting of her first book, The Outsiders. However, unlike Rumble Fish, Ponyboy Curtis, the main character in The Outsiders, appears in That Was Then, This Is Now and even takes part in the events surrounding the dance.

The characters of Tim and Curly Shepard from The Outsiders also appear, as does their sister Angela, who is original to That Was Then, This Is Now. Randy, who was in The Outsiders, also appears as a Hippie in this book, which is appropriate to those who have read or seen The Outsiders, as Randy is an affluent kid who feels guilty about the class division and becomes repulsed by it. In Tex, Mark and Cathy appear, who are original to That Was Then, This Is Now.

Mark later appears as a hitchhiker, who has recently escaped from prison and killed multiple people. He forces Tex and Mason to drive him to the state line, holding them at gunpoint; he is killed soon after by the police.

Cathy appears as Tex's English teacher at school, Ms. Carlson. When Mark dies, she goes to his funeral, which makes Tex wonder why. When he asks her, Cathy says that they weren't exactly friends, but she knew him for a long time and they shared a past.
