= Tim Hunter (director) =

American television and film director (born 1947)

- Born: June 15, 1947 (age 79); Los Angeles, California, U.S.
- Education: Harvard University (1968)
- Occupations: Television and film director
- Years active: 1979–present
- Known for: River's Edge, Carnivàle, Mad Men, Twin Peaks
- Parent: Ian McLellan Hunter
- Relatives: Aileen Hamilton, (aunt)

Tim Hunter (born June 15, 1947, in Los Angeles, California) is an American television and film director.

== Career ==
Since the late 1980s he has mostly worked on television, directing episodes for dozens of televisions series including Breaking Bad, Carnivàle, Chicago Hope, Crossing Jordan, Deadwood, Falcon Crest, Homicide: Life on the Street, House, Law & Order, Lie to Me, Mad Men, Twin Peaks, Glee, Revenge, Pretty Little Liars and American Horror Story. During the early to mid-1980s, Hunter directed several feature films, including 1986's River's Edge, which won that year's award for Best Picture at the Independent Spirit Awards.

== Critical reception ==
Janet Maslin made the following comments about Hunter's work on the films River's Edge and Tex:

As he demonstrated in Tex, Mr. Hunter has an extraordinarily clear understanding of teen-age characters, especially those who must find their own paths without much parental supervision. But the S. E. Hinton story for that film is a great deal more innocent than this one, and a lot more easily understood. While Mr. Hunter retains his ear for adolescent dialogue (the screenplay is by Neal Jimenez) and his eye for the aimless, restless behavior of these characters, neither he nor we can easily make the necessary leap to understand their casualness about Samson's crime. That Mr. Hunter is brave enough to avoid easy moralizing and easy explanations finally makes his film harder to fathom.

== Personal life ==
Hunter was born in Los Angeles, the son of British screenwriter Ian McLellan Hunter. He attended Harvard University, graduating in 1968.

== Filmography ==
=== Film ===
Writer

- Over the Edge (1979)
- Tex (1982)

Director

- Tex (1982)
- Sylvester (1985)
- River's Edge (1986)
- Paint It Black (1989)
- The Saint of Fort Washington (1993)
- The Colony (1996)
- The People Next Door (1996)
- The Maker (1997)
- Rescuers: Stories of Courage: Two Couples (1998) (Segment "Aart and Johtje Vos")
- Rescuers: Stories of Courage: Two Families (1998) (Segment "Malka Csizmadia")
- Mean Streak (1999)
- Anatomy of a Hate Crime (2001)
- Video Voyeur: The Susan Wilson Story (2002)
- The Failures (2003)
- Control (2004)
- The Far Side of Jericho (2006)
- Kings of South Beach (2007)
- Looking Glass (2018)
- Smiley Face Killers (2020)

=== Unrealized projects ===
- Modern Bride (1983)
- Edward Ford (1980s)
- RoboCop 2 (1989)
- Nightwood Bar (1993)
- Guns and Roses (1993)
- The Story of Junk (1999)
- Fade (1999)
- New Orleans (2006)
- This is the Water (2018)

=== Television ===
Year	Title	Notes
1988-1990	Falcon Crest	2 episodes
1990-1991	Twin Peaks	3 episodes
1990	Beverly Hills, 90210	Episode "Class of Beverly Hills"
1991-1993	Dark Justice	2 episodes
1991	Lies of the Twins	TV movie
1991	Eerie, Indiana	2 episodes
1993	Bakersfield P.D.	Episode "There Goes the Neighborhood"
1994	Chicago Hope	Episode "You Gotta Have Heart"
1994-1995	Homicide: Life on the Street	4 episodes
1995	Central Park West	Episode "Days of Thunder"
1995	Fallen Angels	Episode "Fly Paper"
1997	Moloney	Episode "Misconduct"
1998	Michael Hayes	Episode "Vaughn Mower"
1998	Sins of the City	Episode "Honor Among Thieves"
1998	Four Corners	2 episodes
2000	Profiler	Episode "Clean Sweep"
2000	Soul Food	Episode "Claiming"
2001	Dead Last	Episode "To Serve, with Love"
2003	Out of Order	5 episodes
2003-2005	Crossing Jordan	2 episodes
2003-2005	Carnivàle	2 episodes
2004	The 4400	Episode "White Light"
2004	CSI: NY	Episode "Creatures of the Night"
2004-2006	Cold Case	3 episodes
2005	House	Episode "Mob Rules"
2005	Line of Fire	Episode "Born to Run"
2006	South Beach	Episode "Who Do You Trust"
2006	Deadwood	Episode "A Rich Find"
2006-2008	Law & Order	2 episodes
2007-2008	Mad Men	6 episodes
2008	Breaking Bad	Episode "A No-Rough-Stuff-Type Deal"
2008	Army Wives	Episode "Duplicity"
2008	Sons of Anarchy	Episode "Giving Back"
2008	Brotherhood	Episode "All the Interim is like a Phantasma..."
2008-2009	Dexter	2 episodes
2009	Lie to Me	Episode "Love Always"
2009-2010	Nip/Tuck	3 episodes
2010	Saving Grace	Episode "Let’s Talk"
2010	The Glades	Episode "The Girlfriend Experience"
2010	Caprica	Episode "Things We Lock Away"
2010	Outlaw	Episode "In Re: Kelvin Jones"
2011	Glee	Episode "Rumours"
2011	American Horror Story	Episode "Open House"
2011-2012	Revenge	2 episodes
2011-2013	Necessary Roughness	3 episodes
2012	Breakout Kings	Episode "Round Two"
2012	Pretty Little Liars	Episode "This is a Dark Ride"
2013	Cult	Episode "The Kiss"
2013-2014	Hannibal	4 episodes
2014	Intelligence	Episode "The Grey Hat"
2014	The Lottery	Episode "Genie"
2014	Gotham	Episode "Viper"
2015	Powers	Episode "Aha Shake Heartbreak"
2015	The Messengers	Episode "Why We Fight"
2015	Scream	2 episodes
2015	Wayward Pines	2 episodes
2015	Blood & Oil	Episode "The Art of the Deal"
2016	The Blacklist	Episode "Lady Ambrosia"
2016	Underground	2 episodes
2016	Frequency	Episode "Break, Break, Break"
2016-2018	Bosch	2 episodes
2017	Hand of God	Episode "When You Pull the Trigger"
2018	Riverdale	Episode "Chapter Twenty-Three: The Blackboard Jungle"
2020	neXt	Episodes "File #3" and "File #6"
