= Taming the Star Runner =

1988 novel by S. E. Hinton

- Author: S. E. Hinton
- Language: English
- Genre: Young adult fiction
- Publisher: Delacorte Press
- Publication date: 1988
- Publication place: United States
- Media type: Print
- Pages: 192pp
- ISBN: 0-440-20479-8

Taming the Star Runner is a 1988 young adult coming-of-age novel written by S. E. Hinton, author of The Outsiders. Unlike her previous young adult novels, this novel has not been made into a film.

== Context ==
The novel is the last of her series of novels that take place in and around her hometown of Tulsa, Oklahoma and the only one of that series written in the third-person perspective. This is also S.E. Hinton's only novel that was not made into a movie. Like her first book, The Outsiders, it is implied at the end of the book that the protagonist is the actual author. In reality, many of Travis' experiences trying to publish his book parallel those of S.E. Hinton's while trying to publish her first book (having to clean up the language, starting a second book before the first is published, being only 16). It could also be that Travis' book is deliberately similar to Hinton's first book, as it is stated that a major plot point of his book is a title character (the Star Runner) dying in a car accident, similar to Johnny in The Outsiders dying due to injuries sustained in a fire.

== Plot summary ==
Travis is a tough kid living in a big city. When he comes home to find his stepfather cramming the fireplace with his writing, Travis assaults him with a fireplace poker. As a result, he is sent to live with his paternal uncle, Ken, on his ranch outside of Tulsa. Travis, used to living in the city, soon finds country life to be boring. The coolest, toughest kid in school, he is now an out-of-place loner, torn between his desire to fit in and his contempt for country living. Even Ken seems too busy for him, between work at his law-firm and his divorce; he is often too busy to even keep food in the house. Travis continues work on his book while maintaining a correspondence with Joe, the only one of his friends to even occasionally write back.

He also meets Casey Kencaide, who runs a riding school on Ken's ranch and is the only one brave enough to ride the Star Runner, a creature who, like Travis, was never meant to be tamed. Soon Travis is working for Casey as a stable boy, and he receives an offer to publish his book. In response he takes a trip into town to celebrate. While in town he gets drunk and is beat up by the bouncer when his true age is discovered. In bad shape, he contacts his uncle to bring him home and reveals his book deal to Ken, which comes as a surprise as he was unaware that Travis was even fully literate.

For a while life, to Travis, at least seems bearable. Things soon get worse though, as Travis' stepfather refuses to allow the book to be published without his prior approval. Hearing this, Travis has another fit of rage and throws the phone, nearly hitting Ken's wife, Teresa, and their son, Christopher. Teresa, in response to this, and discovering Travis' criminal record, threatens to use his presence in Ken's house to win full custody of Christopher and Ken almost kicks Travis out in his rage to be with his son. Eventually they make peace after they realize that they both hoped that the other would be the father and son they were looking for. It turns out Travis' father died in the Vietnam War two months before Travis was born. Ken then agrees to help Travis get his book published, going with him to meet the publisher Ms. Carmichael when she comes to town, and even arranges some publicity with a TV interview at a station owned by a friend of his.

Travis then gets a surprise visit from his friend Joe, who had hitchhiked his way there. Instead of this being a joyous event, Joe reveals that after Travis left, his friends, Joe and the twins, Billy and Mike, had turned to burglary, fencing the goods through a man named Orson. After Joe quit, the twins continued their burglaries, but found a new fence. For this, Orson killed the twins and tried to make Joe help him. Travis and Ken convince Joe that he must return to face trial as an accomplice, and take him to the local police for extradition.

As they return to Ken's ranch, a huge lightning storm strikes and Ken and Travis must go help Casey round up the horses into the barn. As they do this, the Star Runner breaks free of his paddock. Casey and Travis give chase only to have Casey's Jeep struck by lightning. Travis smells burned flesh, implying that the Star Runner has been killed.

The book ends as Casey and Travis have recovered from the accident and the temporary hearing loss. Though Casey had previously spurned Travis' romantic overtures, they are now close friends who share a common bond. Travis also realizes that he, like the Star Runner, should never allow himself to be tamed or broken, even when life is at its worst.
