= Jim Metzler =

American actor (b. 1951)

- Born: June 23, 1951 (age 75); Oneonta, New York, U.S.
- Education: Dartmouth College (B.A., 1971)
- Occupation: Actor

James R. Metzler (born June 23, 1951) is a retired American actor. During a career that spanned over three decades, he appeared in numerous films and television series. He was nominated for a Golden Globe Award for Best Supporting Actor – Motion Picture for his performance in the 1982 film Tex.

== Life and career ==
Metzler was born in Oneonta, New York in 1951. He was a standout baseball player in high school, and was scouted by the Boston Red Sox, but was cut after two years in the farm system, playing one season each in the New York–Penn League and the Florida State League. He majored in English Literature at Dartmouth College, then worked as a sports writer covering high school athletics. He was an assistant sports editor for The Evening News in Newburgh, New York. He left journalism in his late-20s, and worked a string of odd jobs before moving to Los Angeles to become an actor.

In his second-ever acting role, Metzler had a co-starring role in the ensemble drama Four Friends (1981), directed by Arthur Penn. The following year, he had a breakthrough playing Mace McCormick in the film Tex (1982). Metzler, who was 29-years old at the time, played a 17-year old, and lied about his age at the audition in order to get the part. Metzler's performance earned him a Golden Globe Award nomination for Best Supporting Actor – Motion Picture.

He has appeared in over 80 films and television series. He retired from acting in 2015.

== Filmography ==
=== Films ===
- Squeeze Play! (1979) - Second base
- Four Friends (1981) - Tom
- Tex (1982) - Mason McCormick
- River's Edge (1986) - Mr. Burkewaite
- The Christmas Star (1986) - Stewart Jameson
- Hot to Trot (1988) - Boyd Osborne
- 976-EVIL (1988) - Marty Palmer
- Sundown: The Vampire in Retreat (1989) - David
- Old Gringo (1989) - Ron
- Circuitry Man (1990) - Danner
- Delusion (1991) - George O'Brien
- One False Move (1992) - Dud Cole
- Waxwork II: Lost in Time (1992) - Roger
- A Weekend with Barbara und Ingrid (1992) - Danny Shaffer
- Gypsy Eyes (1992) - Harry Noble
- Plughead Rewired: Circuitry Man II (1994) - Danner
- Children of the Corn III: Urban Harvest (1995) - William Porter
- Cadillac Ranch (1996) - Travis Crowley
- L.A. Confidential (1997) - City Councilman
- A Gun, a Car, a Blonde (1997) - Richard / Rick Stone
- St. Patrick's Day (1997) - Adam
- Phantom Town (1999) - Dad
- The Big Brass Ring (1999) - Pacxy Barragan
- Bad City Blues (1999) - Luther Logan
- What Matters Most (2001) - Alex
- The Doe Boy (2001) - Dr. Moore
- What Matters Most (2001) - Reverend Worth
- Megiddo: The Omega Code 2 (2001) - Breckenridge
- Under the Influence (2002) - Geary
- The United States of Leland (2003) - Cemetery Reporter
- Wiener Dog Nationals (2013) - Mr. Fleet

=== Television ===
- Princess Daisy (1983, TV Movie) - John
- North and South, Books 1 & 2 (1985) - James Huntoon
- Beauty and the Beast (1988-1989) - Steven Bass
- Murder by Night (1989, TV movie) - Kevin Carlisle
- Murder, She Wrote (1991) - Tom Benzinger
- Diagnosis: Murder (1994) - Dr. Tom Harvey
- Star Trek: Deep Space Nine (1995) - Chris Brynner
- JAG (1996) - Commander Miller
- Apollo 11 (1996, TV Movie) - Mike Collins
- Sliders (1998) - Jonathan Griffin
- Witness Protection (1999, TV Movie) - Jim Cutler
- CSI: NY (2004) - Dr. Huff
- NYPD Blue (2005) - Roger Harborn
- Crossing Jordan (2007) - Judge Clarence Gordon
- Amish Grace (2010, TV Movie) - County Sheriff
- Glee (2011) - Minister

=== Video games ===
- Silent Steel (1995) - Master Chief

== Awards and nominations ==
Ceremony	Category	Nominated work	Result	Ref.
40th Golden Globe Awards	Best Supporting Actor	Tex	Nominated	
