= S. E. Hinton =

American writer (born 1948)

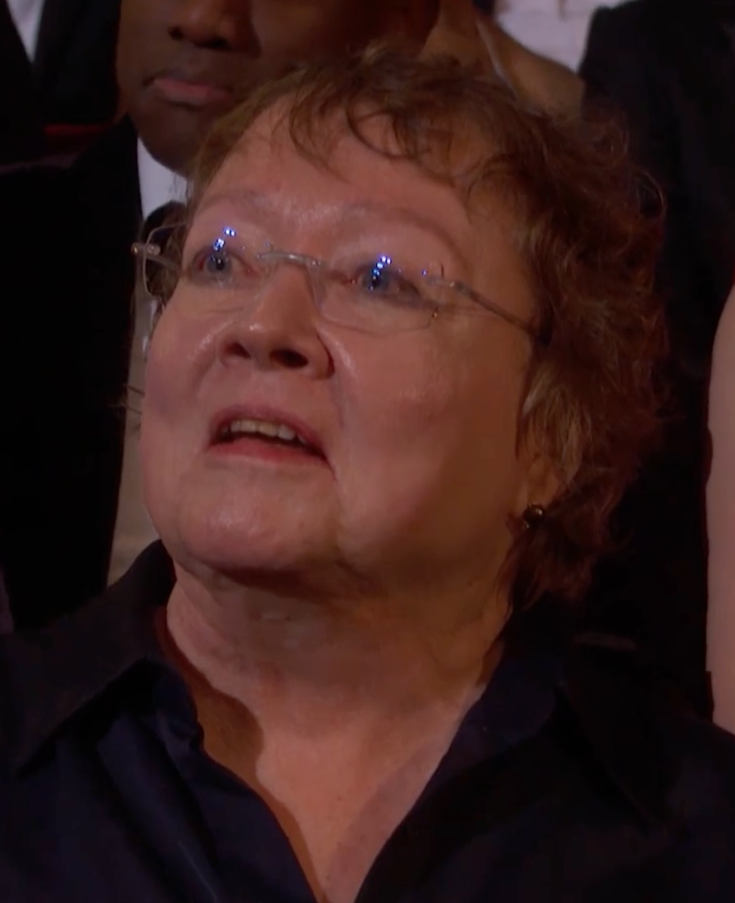
- Hinton at the 77th Tony Awards in 2024
- Born: Susan Eloise Hinton; July 22, 1948 (age 78); Tulsa, Oklahoma, U.S.
- Education: University of Tulsa
- Occupation: Writer
- Spouse: David E. Inhofe (m. 1970; died 2025)
- Children: 1
- Relatives: Jim Inhofe (cousin-in-law)
- Writing career
- Period: 1967–present
- Genres: Young adult literature; children's literature; screenplays
- Notable awards: Margaret Edwards Award (1988)
- Website: www.sehinton.com

Susan Eloise Hinton (born July 22, 1948) is an American writer best known for her young-adult novels (YA) set in Oklahoma, especially The Outsiders (1967), which she wrote during high school. (Note: "Once a teen sensation who wrote her most famous book while still in high school, Hinton is now 59." –Italie) Hinton is credited with introducing the YA genre. She graduated from the University of Tulsa.

In 1988, she received the inaugural Margaret Edwards Award from the American Library Association for her cumulative contribution in writing for teens. (Note: Before 1988 the ALA awards did not distinguish "children's" literature—the Newbery book award and Wilder career award—from that for "young adults". Hinton won the first biennial "Young Adult Services Division/School Library Journal Author Achievement Award", according to plan, but there were only two as it was renamed and made annual after 1990. On the last point compare the 1988, 1990, and 1991 Edwards Award citations.)

== Early life ==
Susan Eloise Hinton was born on July 22, 1948 in Tulsa, Oklahoma. Her father, Grady, was a door-to-door salesman, and her mother, Lillian, was a factory worker. Lillian was physically and emotionally abusive, throwing one of Hinton's early manuscripts in a trash burner (though she allowed her to rescue them), and Hinton described Grady as "an extremely cold man."

Growing up, she and her family attended a "fundamentalist, hellfire and brimstone" church, which she disliked deeply and turned her away from religion as an adult. Grady developed a brain tumor when Hinton was 15 and died when she was in her junior year of high school.

== Career ==
=== 1960s: The Outsiders ===
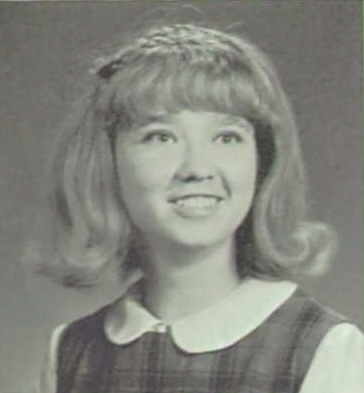
Hinton at Will Rogers High School in 1966, around the time she wrote The Outsiders

While still in her teens, Hinton wrote The Outsiders, her first and most popular novel, set in Oklahoma in the 1960s. She began writing it in 1965. The book was inspired by two rival gangs at her school, Will Rogers High School, the Greasers and the Socs, and her desire to empathize with the Greasers by writing from their point of view. (Note: "Someone should tell their side of the story, and maybe people would understand then and wouldn't be so quick to judge.") She wrote the novel when she was 16 and it was published in 1967. Since then, the book has sold more than 14 million copies. In 2017, Viking Press stated the book sells over 500,000 copies a year.

Hinton's publisher suggested she use her initials instead of her feminine given names so that the first male book reviewers would not dismiss the novel because its author was female. (Note: "Viking signed her ... with a suggestion that she call herself S.E. in print, so male critics wouldn't be turned off by a woman writer." –Italie) After the success of The Outsiders, Hinton chose to continue writing and publishing using her initials because she did not want to lose what she had made famous (Note: "I made the name famous. I'm not gonna lose it.") and to allow her to keep her private and public lives separate. (Note: "I like having a private name and a public name. It helps keep things straight.")

=== 1970s–1980s: Young adult novels ===
In 1971, Hinton released her second book, That Was Then, This Is Now, a coming-of-age story following two close friends, Byron and Mark, whose friendship is tested when the two of them are exposed to the world of drug dealing. Her third book, Rumble Fish, followed in 1975. It is about high-schooler Rusty-James, whose admiration for his older brother leads to jealousy and heartbreak. Her fourth young adult novel, Tex, was published in 1979 and follows reckless teenager Tex and his difficult family life. Taming the Star Runner, her final young adult novel, was published in 1988 and is the only one of her YA novels that has not been made into a film.

By 1982, her four novels had sold over 10 million copies.

=== 1990s–2000s: Children's and adult books ===
In the 1990s, Hinton began writing children's books. She published the picture book Big David, Little David in 1995. It was followed later that year with The Puppy Sister, a children's novella about a family's pet dog turning into a human.

In 2004, Hinton released her first adult novel, Hawkes Harbor. Unlike her previous books, Hawkes Harbor contains strong language and sexual situations. Her second adult novel, Some of Tim's Stories, was published in 2007.

Hinton continues to write and has tried other styles of writing, including screenwriting.

== Personal life ==
In interviews, Hinton has said that she is a private person and an introvert who no longer does public appearances. She enjoys reading (Jane Austen, Mary Renault, and F. Scott Fitzgerald), taking classes at the local university, and horseback riding (she has shown in dressage and jumping). Hinton also revealed to Vulture that she enjoys writing fan fiction.

In 1970, Hinton married David E. Inhofe, a software engineer she met in her freshman biology class at college. He is a cousin of former Oklahoma Senator Jim Inhofe. Following the success of The Outsiders, Hinton developed writer's block and grew depressed, and Inhofe encouraged her to keep writing by making her write two pages a day, which led to the eventual completion of That Was Then, This Is Now. Their only child, Nicholas David, was born in August 1983 in Tulsa, where Hinton and her husband reside.

== Adaptations ==
The film adaptations The Outsiders (March 1983) and Rumble Fish (October 1983) were both directed by Francis Ford Coppola; Hinton cowrote the script for Rumble Fish with Coppola. Also adapted to film were Tex (July 1982), directed by Tim Hunter, and That Was Then... This Is Now (November 1985), directed by Christopher Cain. Hinton herself acted as a location scout, and she had cameo roles in three of the four films. She plays a nurse in Dallas's hospital room in The Outsiders. In Tex, she is the typing teacher. She also appears as a sex worker propositioning Rusty James in Rumble Fish. In 2009, Hinton portrayed the school principal in The Legend of Billy Fail.

== Awards and honors ==
In 1992, she was inducted into Phi Beta Kappa by the University of Tulsa, and in 1998 she was inducted into the Oklahoma Writers Hall of Fame at the Oklahoma Center for Poets and Writers of Oklahoma State University–Tulsa.

Year	Organization	Category	Work	Result	Ref.
1967	New York Herald Tribune	Best Teenage Books List	The Outsiders	Won	
1967	Chicago Tribune Book World	Spring Book Festival Honor Book	The Outsiders	Won	
1971	Chicago Tribune Book World	Spring Book Festival Honor Book	That Was Then, This Is Now	Won	
	American Library Association	Best Book for Young Adults	That Was Then, This Is Now	Won	
1975	American Library Association	Best Book for Young Adults	The Outsiders	Won	
1975	American Library Association	Best Book for Young Adults	Rumble Fish	Won	
1975	Media and Methods	Maxi Award	The Outsiders	Won	
1975	School Library Journal	Best Books of the Year	Rumble Fish	Won	
1978	Massachusetts Children's Book Award	—N/a	That Was Then, This Is Now	Won	
1979	American Library Association	Best Books for Young Adults	Tex	Won	
1979	American Library Association	Best Books for Young Adults	Taming the Star Runner	Won	
1979	Massachusetts Children's Book Award	—N/a	The Outsiders	Won	
1979	School Library Journal	Best Books of the Year	Taming the Star Runner	Won	
1979	School Library Journal	Best Books of the Year	Tex	Won	
1980	New York Public Library	Books for the Teen-Age	Tex	Won	
1980	New York Public Library	Books for the Teen-Age	Taming the Star Runner	Won	
1981	American Book Awards	—N/a	Taming the Star Runner	Nominated	
1981	American Book Awards	—N/a	Tex	Nominated	
1982	California Young Reader Medal	—N/a	Taming the Star Runner	Nominated	
1982	California Young Reader Medal	—N/a	Tex	Nominated	
1982	New Mexico Library Association	Land of the Enchantment Award	Rumble Fish	Won	
1982	Louisiana Association of School Librarians	Sue Hefly Honor Book	Taming the Star Runner	Won	
1983	Louisiana Association of School Librarians	Sue Hefly Award	Taming the Star Runner	Won	
1983	Louisiana Association of School Librarians	Sue Hefly Award	Tex	Won	
1988	American Library Association	Margaret A. Edwards Award	The Outsiders, That Was Then, This Is Now, Rumble Fish, Tex	Won	
1995	Parent's Choice	Silver Honor Book	The Puppy Sister	Won	

== Works ==
=== Young adult novels ===
The five YA novels, her first books published, are Hinton's works most widely held in WorldCat libraries. All are set in Oklahoma, and take place within a shared universe.

- The Outsiders (1967)
- That Was Then, This Is Now (1971)
- Rumble Fish (1975)
- Tex (1979)
- Taming the Star Runner (1988)

=== Children's books ===
- Big David, Little David, illustrated by Alan Daniel (1995), picture book
- The Puppy Sister, illustrated by Jacqueline Rogers (1995), chapter book

=== Adult fiction ===
- Hawkes Harbor (2004), novel
- Some of Tim's Stories (2007), short stories

=== Autobiography ===
- Great Women Writers, Rita Dove, S.E. Hinton, and Maya Angelou (Princeton NJ: Hacienda Productions, 1999), DVD video — autobiographical accounts by the three authors
