= New Mexico Library Association =

Professional association for librarians in New Mexico

- Nickname: NMLA
- Formation: February 23, 1924; 102 years ago
- Tax ID no.: 23-7024820
- Headquarters: Albuquerque, New Mexico
- Parent organization: American Library Association
- Website: nmla.org

The New Mexico Library Association (NMLA) is a professional organization for New Mexico's librarians and library workers. It is headquartered in Albuquerque, New Mexico. It was officially founded on February 3, 1924. Evelyn Shuler, director of Raton Public Library and director for the ALA United War Work Campaign in New Mexico, was the organization's first president.

There were a few attempts to put together a state library association in New Mexico between 1901 and 1915. Starting in 1914, librarians would participate in program meetings during the New Mexico Education Association. Spurred on by the formation of the Southwestern Library Association (SWLA) in Texas in 1922, librarians from New Mexico met at a colleague's home to form the NMLA so that they could be ratifiers of its constitution. By May, 1924 the organization had seventy-five members. NMLA completed a survey of library conditions in the state in 1927 and found that the state had "nine public libraries, ten club libraries, eleven school libraries supported by taxation, one hospital library"

== See also ==
- List of libraries in the United States
