= The Outsiders (novel) =

1967 novel by S. E. Hinton

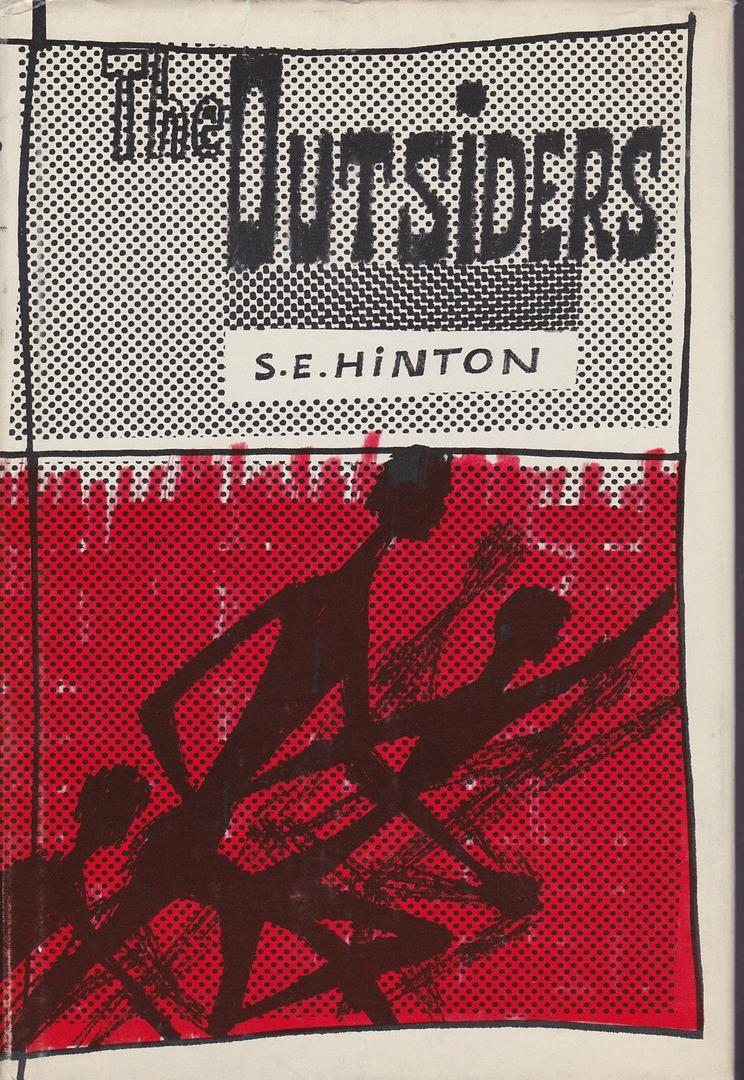
- First hardcover edition, 1967
- Author: S. E. Hinton
- Cover artist: Richard M. Powers
- Language: English
- Genre: Young adult fiction
- Publisher: Viking Press, Dell Publishing
- Publication date: April 24, 1967
- Publication place: United States
- Media type: Print (hardcover, paperback), Audiobook, Ebook
- Pages: 192
- ISBN: 0-670-53257-6
- OCLC: 64396432
- Followed by: That Was Then, This Is Now

The Outsiders is a coming-of-age novel by S. E. Hinton published in 1967 by Viking Press. The novel is set in Tulsa, Oklahoma, in the 1960s (Note: Adaptations of the story say that the story takes place in different years; the Outsiders DX Station says 1966, The Outsiders House Museum says 1965, and the musical adaptation says 1967.)—although this is never explicitly stated in the book—and details the conflict between two rival gangs of White Americans divided by their socioeconomic status: the working-class "greasers" and the upper-middle-class "socs" (pronounced /ˈsoʊʃɪz/ SOH-shiz—short for socials). The story is told in first-person perspective by teenage protagonist Ponyboy Curtis.

Hinton began writing the novel when she was 15 and wrote the bulk of it when she was 16 and a junior in high school. She was 18 when the book was published. She released the work using her initials rather than her feminine given names (Susan Eloise) so that her gender would not lead male book reviewers to dismiss the work.

A film adaptation was directed in 1983 by Francis Ford Coppola, and a short-lived television series appeared in 1990, picking up where the movie left off. A dramatic stage adaptation was written by Christopher Sergel and published in 1990. A Tony Award-winning stage musical adaptation of the same name premiered in San Diego in 2023 then on Broadway in 2024. Another film adaptation, this time based on the musical, was in the works as of 2025.

== Plot summary ==
In Tulsa, Oklahoma, Ponyboy Curtis, a fourteen-year-old boy who is a member of a "gang of greasers", is leaving a movie theater when he is jumped by "Socs", the greasers' rival gang. Several greasers, including Ponyboy's two older brothers—the paternal Darry and the popular Sodapop—come to his rescue. The next night, Ponyboy and two greaser friends, the hardened Dally and the quiet Johnny, meet Cherry and Marcia, a pair of Soc girls, at a drive-in movie theater. Cherry scorns Dally's rude advances, but Ponyboy speaks civilly with Cherry, emotionally connecting with a Soc for the first time in his life.

Afterward, Ponyboy, Johnny, and their wisecracking friend Two-Bit begin to walk Cherry and Marcia home, when they are stopped by Cherry's boyfriend Bob, who badly beat up Johnny a few months back. Bob and the greasers exchange taunts, but Cherry prevents a fight by willingly leaving with Bob. Ponyboy gets home at two in the morning, enraging Darry until he suddenly slaps Ponyboy. As Darry tries to apologize, Pony runs out the door and meets up with Johnny, expressing his anger at Darry's increasing coldness in the wake of his parents' recent deaths in a car crash.

Running away from home, Ponyboy and Johnny wander into a park, where Bob and four other Socs surround them. After some heated talk, Ponyboy spits at the Socs, prompting them to attempt to drown him in a nearby fountain, but Johnny stabs Bob, killing him and dispersing the rest. Terrified as to what to do next, Ponyboy and Johnny rush to find Dally, who gives them money and a loaded firearm, directing them to hide in an abandoned church in Windrixville. During their stay there, Ponyboy cuts and dyes his hair as a disguise, reads Gone with the Wind to Johnny, and, upon viewing a beautiful sunrise, recites the poem "Nothing Gold Can Stay" by Robert Frost.

Days later, Dally comes to check on them, revealing that violence between the greasers and Socs has escalated since Bob's death into all-out city-wide warfare, with Cherry acting out of guilt as a spy for the greasers. Johnny decides to turn himself in and Dally reluctantly agrees to take the boys back home. As they attempt to leave, they notice the church has caught fire and several local schoolchildren have become trapped inside. The greasers run inside the burning church to save the children, but Ponyboy is rendered unconscious by the fumes. At the hospital he discovers that he and Dally are not badly injured, but a piece of the church roof fell on Johnny and broke his back. Sodapop and Darry come to the hospital; Darry breaks down and cries. Ponyboy then realizes that Darry cares about him, and is only hard on him because he loves him and cares about his future.

The following morning the newspapers declare Ponyboy and Johnny heroes, but Johnny will be charged with manslaughter for Bob's death. Two-Bit tells them that the greaser–Soc rivalry is to be settled in a final rumble. Ponyboy and Two-Bit are approached by a Soc named Randy, Bob's best friend, who expresses remorse for his involvement in the gang war, lacks confidence about the rumble ending the feud, and says he will not participate.

Later, Ponyboy visits Johnny at the hospital, where he is in critical condition. On their way home, Ponyboy spots Cherry and they talk. Cherry says she is unwilling to visit Johnny in the hospital because he killed her boyfriend. Ponyboy calls her a traitor, but after she explains herself they end on good terms. After escaping the hospital, Dally shows up just in time for the rumble. The greasers win the fight. Afterward, Ponyboy and Dally hurry back to the hospital to see Johnny, but he dies moments later and a hysterical Dally runs out of the room. Ponyboy returns home that night feeling confused and disoriented. Dally calls the house to say that he has robbed a store and is running from the police. The greasers find Dally deliberately pointing an unloaded firearm at the police, causing them to shoot and kill him. Overwhelmed, Ponyboy faints and is sick in bed for many days due to the resulting concussion from the rumble. When the hearing finally comes, the judge frees Ponyboy from responsibility for Bob's death and allows Ponyboy to remain at home with Darry and Sodapop.

Ponyboy returns to school, but his grades drop. Although he is failing English, his teacher, Mr. Syme, says he will pass him if he writes a decent theme. In the copy of Gone with the Wind, Ponyboy finds a letter from Johnny describing how he will die proudly after saving the kids from the fire. Johnny also urges Ponyboy to "stay gold". Ponyboy decides to write his English assignment about the recent events, and begins his essay with the novel’s opening line: "When I stepped out into the bright sunlight from the darkness of the movie house, I had only two things on my mind: Paul Newman and a ride home".

== Major characters ==
=== Greasers ===
- Ponyboy Curtis: The narrator and the youngest Curtis brother, Ponyboy is 14 years old, and gets good grades and runs track. He is the most sensitive of the greasers (besides Johnny), and enjoys reading books.
- Sodapop "Soda" Curtis: The middle Curtis brother, 16 years old, a popular high school dropout who works at a gas station. He is often described as being attractive and comedic, the reason for his popularity. He is a supportive brother to Ponyboy.
- Darrel "Darry" Curtis: The oldest Curtis brother, 20 years old, who has been caring for his brothers since their parents died in a car crash. He is the unofficial leader of the gang. He is described as being very athletic and strong.
- Johnny Cade: Ponyboy's best friend. 16 years old, who is extremely quiet and lives with his alcoholic, neglectful, and abusive parents. He is sensitive in the first part of the book. However, in the latter part of the book, Johnny faces his fears, becoming a hero-like figure.
- Dallas "Dally" Winston: A 17-year-old juvenile delinquent, he is the roughest and most volatile of the greasers, but cares more about Johnny than he does anyone else. He lived on the streets of New York City for three years. He carries an unloaded firearm at all times.
- Keith "Two-Bit" Mathews: A wise-cracking kleptomaniac. He is known for carrying a switchblade.
- Steve Randle: Sodapop's best friend since grade school.
- Timothy "Tim" Shepard: Leader of another greaser gang: an organized downtown one. He is also a friend of Dally's.
- Curly Shepard: Tim Shepard's younger brother, mentioned as a friend of Ponyboy's.
- Sandy: Sodapop's disloyal girlfriend, who eventually leaves him.

=== Socs ===
- Sherri "Cherry" Valance: Attends the same high school as Ponyboy. Bob's girlfriend.
- Robert "Bob" Sheldon: Considered the leader of the Socs. Cherry's boyfriend who is stabbed and killed by Johnny.
- Randy Adderson: Bob's best friend and Marcia's boyfriend. After Bob’s death, Randy has a conversation with Ponyboy asking for peace.
- Marcia: Cherry's best friend and Randy's girlfriend.
- Paul Holden: Darry's old friend from high school.
- David: A member of the Socs who tries to drown Ponyboy in the fountain.

=== Other characters ===
- Jerry Wood: The schoolteacher responsible for the children who were in the seemingly abandoned church.
- Mr. Syme: Ponyboy's English teacher who assigns him a theme to write that becomes the story of the novel itself.

== Background and writing ==
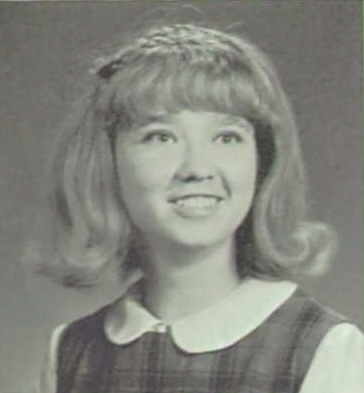
S.E. Hinton (pictured 1966), the writer of The Outsiders

Born in 1948, S.E. Hinton grew up in her birthplace of Tulsa, Oklahoma, and went to Will Rogers High School. From early in her life, Hinton had an interest in reading and writing. Prior to writing The Outsiders, Hinton wrote two manuscripts centering around horses, neither of which she intended to publish due to her viewing them as practice. In high school, Hinton noticed and disliked that her peers had formed cliques that were violently opposed to each other. One event that impacted Hinton was when a friend of hers was suddenly assaulted by Socs for being a greaser. Furthermore, Hinton felt that at the time, books aimed toward her demographic did not reflect her teenaged experiences regarding trauma and cliques. Instead, she found these books to be sentimental, vapid, and cliched, often following generic storylines such as characters going to prom. To remedy this, Hinton sought to write the type of novel targeted toward teenagers that she wanted to read.

Hinton began writing what would become The Outsiders when she was 15 and completed it when she was 16 in her junior year of high school, the same year she got a D in creative writing class. Hinton wrote three drafts of the novel before it was shown to a publisher. Like Hinton's later novels, The Outsiders is set in Tulsa and written from a male perspective. Hinton felt that writing from male perspective was easier for her due to her being a tomboy and not relating to other girls. Hinton has cited multiple inspirations for elements in her novel, such as the group tensions in her high school and when her friend was attacked by rich teenagers. The scene introducing Cherry at the drive-in theater was inspired by Hinton witnessing an argument between a couple at the real-life Admiral Twin Drive-In. According to biographer Jay Daly, the death of Hinton's father Grady by brain cancer might have bolstered Hinton's drive to finish The Outsiders.

Hinton initially did not plan on publishing The Outsiders. After asking for and receiving Hinton's book, a friend gave it to her mother, who gave it to her friend, who encouraged Hinton to send the manuscript to literary agent Marilyn Marlow. Upon reading the manuscript, under the title A Different Sunset, Marlow sent a letter to Hinton, saying that her book "captured a certain spirit", and started pitching it to publishers. The book was sold to Viking Press for $1,000, and Hinton found out her book was accepted by a publisher on her last day of school. Editor Velma Varner of Viking Press provided Hinton notes for revising her book, as well as advice that she be credited under her gender-neutral initials for the book to appeal to boys. Viking Press published The Outsiders on April 24, 1967, on hardcover, with Dell Publishing later publishing the book in paperback. Despite depicting teenaged characters, The Outsiders was initially published for adult audiences due to it differing from the young adult literature of the time. Its target demographic shifted when the publishers discovered that teenagers were the novel's primary readership.

== Reception ==
The Outsiders was met with generally positive reviews, with many critics finding the novel sincere. In his review, Thomas Fleming of The New York Times Book Review asked, "Can sincerity overcome cliché?" Answering in the affirmative regarding The Outsiders, Fleming found Hinton's writing impressive for someone her age, a sentiment echoed by other critics. The Horn Book Magazine considered the novel's depiction of its characters believable, and Saturday Review found the teenaged writer to be "sensitive, honest, and observant". Library Journal deemed the novel compassionate if sentimental and the teenaged writer as "not yet practiced in restraint" and yet a better storyteller than many adult writers. In contrast to the more positive reception, Virginia Kirkus' Service gave The Outsiders a negative review, saying "You can believe a teen-ager wrote it but you can bet teen-agers won't believe what it says."

== Controversy ==
The Outsiders was a controversial book at the time of its publication; it is still currently challenged and debated. It was ranked #38 on the American Library Association’s Top 100 Most Frequently Challenged Books of 1990–1999. This book has been banned from some schools and libraries because of the portrayal of gang violence, underage smoking and drinking, strong language/slang, and family dysfunction. However, in many U.S. schools, the book is part of the English curriculum at the middle- or high-school level.

The American Indians in Children's Literature (AICL), an organization and website offering critical analysis of Native American depictions in children's literature, has highlighted the book's use of what are now seen as stereotypical and racist terms targeting Native Americans, as part of the character Two-Bit's "joking" remarks. This included words like "squaw" and "wild Indians".

== Legacy ==
Ponyboy Curtis appears in Hinton's later novel That Was Then, This Is Now (1971). The 1983 film adaptation, directed by Francis Ford Coppola, has retained a fan base since its release. The film is notable for casting young actors before their rise to fame, which includes C. Thomas Howell, Ralph Macchio, Matt Dillon, Patrick Swayze, Rob Lowe, Emilio Estevez, Tom Cruise, and Diane Lane.

A television series based on the characters of the novel and film aired in 1990. It consists of a different cast playing the same characters. It picks up right after the events of the film's ending and lasted only one season.

In Rockstar Games' 2006 video game Bully, the Greasers and the Preppies/Preps are based on The Outsiders.

A stage musical of the same name held its world premiere at La Jolla Playhouse in February/March 2023. The production was directed by Danya Taymor from a libretto by Adam Rapp, with songs by Jamestown Revival and music supervision, arrangements, and orchestrations by Justin Levine. The show began previews on Broadway at the Bernard B. Jacobs Theatre on March 16, 2024 and officially opened on April 11. It received 12 nominations at the 77th Tony Awards, winning 4 including Best Musical. The musical is set to be adapted into a feature film as of March 2025.

=== Museum and film locations ===
The Outsiders House Museum opened in Tulsa, Oklahoma, on August 9, 2019.

In 2009, hip-hop artist Danny Boy O'Connor discovered the house that was used for the Curtis Brothers' home. Moving forward O'Connor kept the thought of buying it, which he eventually did in 2016. O'Connor said he bought it sight unseen and that when he first went inside it was falling apart. With the help of friends, the Oklahoma Film and Music Office, the City Council, local businesses and individuals who volunteered the restoration started. After raising funds the house went through extensive renovations to restore it and maintain its authenticity from the film. A GoFundMe was set up for additional funds, notable donors include Jack White who donated $30,000 and Billy Idol. Also to raise funds, screenings of the film were organized that actor C. Thomas Howell attended. In 2016, the street signs on the corner were changed to "The Outsiders Way" and "Curtis Brothers Lane". Since its opening, the museum now contains a collection of The Outsiders memorabilia. Aside from Howell, between its restoration and opening, other stars of the films visited: this includes Rob Lowe, Ralph Macchio, and Matt Dillon. For his efforts on preserving a cultural landmark O'Connor received a key to the city of Tulsa.

In 2022, in Sperry, Oklahoma, the group Upward Sperry restored the now defunct DX gas station seen in the film. The group's president Gary Coulson said, "It's really growing. I almost hate to say, but it's almost like a cult following. They stream through here – what that does is get people here." With O'Connor they are planning to revitalize Outsiders nostalgia in Sperry.

== Bibliography ==
- Adams, Laurie (2018). "S. E. Hinton: Matriarch of Young Adult Literature, Observer in the Moment". In Grimes, M. Katherine (ed.). Critical Insights: The Outsiders. Grey House Publishing. pp. xxiii–xxx. ISBN 9781682176863.
- Daly, Jay (1989). Presenting S.E. Hinton. Twayne Publishers. ISBN 9780805782035.
- Evans, Robert C. (2018). "S. E. Hinton on The Outsiders: A Compendium of Interviews". In Grimes, M. Katherine (ed.). Critical Insights: The Outsiders. Grey House Publishing. pp. 65–86. ISBN 9781682176863.
- Hinton, S.E. (1967). The Outsiders. New York: SPEAK. ISBN 978-0-14-038572-4.
