= Hell's Kitchen (Original Broadway Cast Recording) =

Cast recording by Alicia Keys, Shoshana Bean, Maleah Joi Moon and Tank (Note: Tank is only credited on deluxe edition of the album.)
- Released: June 7, 2024
- Length: 60:34
- Label: Alicia Keys
- Producers: Alicia Keys; Adam Blackstone; Tom Kitt

Alicia Keys chronology
| Santa Baby (2022) | Hell's Kitchen (Original Broadway Cast Recording) (2024) | Lovers Rose (2026) |

Singles from Hell's Kitchen
- 1. "Kaleidoscope" Released: March 22, 2024

Hell's Kitchen (Original Broadway Cast Recording) is the cast album to the 2023 musical Hell's Kitchen. The musical is based on semi-autobiographical plot about her upbringing in Manhattan in the 1990s, with music, lyrics by Alicia Keys and Adam Blackstone and book by Kristoffer Diaz. The cast album was released through Alicia Keys Records on June 7, 2024. The recording features the original cast, which includes Maleah Joi Moon, Shoshana Bean, Kecia Lewis, Brandon Victor Dixon, Vanessa Ferguson and Chris Lee.

== Background and release ==
In June 2023, Keys announced she had written her first jukebox musical Hell's Kitchen inspired by her own life and career in New York City. The musical features some of Keys's best known songs, as well as new music written by Keys specifically for the musical: "The River," "Seventeen," and "Kaleidoscope". "Kaleidoscope" was the first song released from the musical on March 22, 2024.

In May 2024, during an interview on Today, Keys announced that the musical's cast album would be released in June that year, saying: "We purposefully put it together so that you really get a sense of the entire arc of the show as you're listening to it". Keys further explained that listeners will be able to hear the songs in an exciting and new way: "Every time you hear the song, it’s in a new way. You know this song, and you love it, but you're hearing it in a way you've never heard before." A deluxe edition of the album was announced in May 2025, containing three new bonus songs with new cast members.

== Critical reception ==
Professional ratings
Review scores
| Source | Rating |
|---|---|
| The Guardian | 5/5 stars |

The Guardian praised Hell's Kitchen as a vibrant, emotionally charged Alicia Keys musical blending dazzling choreography, evocative set design, and refreshed hits, calling it Broadway-ready. The New York Times highlighted the cast's vocal diversity in Hell's Kitchen, noting that Moon, Bean, and Dixon shine in distinct styles that harmonize seamlessly with Keys and Adam Blackstone's arrangements. Variety described the album as more than a love story, portraying it instead as a heartfelt tribute to New York, girlhood, womanhood, and the women who guide us along the way. Entertainment Weekly noted the clichés of jukebox musicals but summarized that Hell's Kitchen, inspired by Keys' teenage years, followed its sold-out Public Theater run with a debut at the Shubert Theatre. Vulture praised it as a mother-daughter story, noting that strong performances transformed Keys' familiar songs into emotionally fresh interpretations.

== Track listing ==
All songs were produced by Alicia Keys, Adam Blackstone and Tom Kitt.

Standard edition
| No. | Title | Writer(s) | Length |
|---|---|---|---|
| 1. | "The Elevator Prologue" | Adam Blackstone | 1:10 |
| 2. | "The Gospel" | Mark Christopher Batson; Dennis Coles; Kasseem Dean; Robert Diggs; Lamont Hawkins; Alicia Keys; Shawn Martin; Corey Woods | 4:36 |
| 3. | "The River" | Keys; Johnny McDaid | 3:17 |
| 4. | "Seventeen" | Keys | 2:42 |
| 5. | "You Don't Know My Name" | Ralph Bailey; Melvin Kent; Keys; Harold Spencer Jr. Lilly; Kanye West; Kenneth Williams | 3:04 |
| 6. | "Miss Liza Jane Plays Piano for The First Time" | Blackstone | 1:25 |
| 7. | "Kaleidoscope (Ali's Version)" | Breyan Isaac; Keys | 4:53 |
| 8. | "Gramercy Park" | Keys; James Napier; Samuel Elliot Roman | 2:57 |
| 9. | "Not Even The King" | Keys; Emeli Sandé | 2:29 |
| 10. | "Teenage Love Affair" | Josephine Bridges; Carl Hampton; Keys; Jr. Lilly; Tom Nixon; Jack Splash | 2:14 |
| 11. | "Not Even the King (Reprise)" | Keys; Sandé | 1:25 |
| 12. | "Unthinkable (I'm Ready)" | Kerry Brothers; Drake; Keys; Noah Shebib | 3:41 |
| 13. | "You Play These Notes" | Blackstone | 2:25 |
| 14. | "Girl on Fire" | Jeff Bhasker; Vanessa Ferguson; Keys; Nicki Minaj; Salaam Remi; William Squier | 5:09 |
| 15. | "Perfect Way To Die" | Keys; Coleridge Tillman | 4:35 |
| 16. | "Heartburn" | Walter Milsap III; Keys; Timothy Mosley; Candice Nelson; Erika Rose Santoro | 2:40 |
| 17. | "Love Looks Better" | Lorrance Dopson; Keys; Ryan Tedder; Noel Zancanella | 3:06 |
| 18. | "Work on It" | Keys; Pharrell Williams | 2:06 |
| 19. | "Price, Bonds, and Scott" | Blackstone | 0:53 |
| 20. | "Authors of Forever" | Jonny Coffer; Keys; McDaid | 4:05 |
| 21. | "Fallin'" | Keys | 3:09 |
| 22. | "If I Ain't Got You" | Keys | 4:28 |
| 23. | "Pawn It All" | Mark Batson; Swizz Beatz; Keys; Harold Lilly | 3:30 |
| 24. | "Like You'll Never See Me Again" | Brothers; Keys | 2:27 |
| 25. | "When It's All Over" | Stacy Barthe; Keys; Smith; John Roger Stephens | 2:05 |
| 26. | "Hallelujah" / "Like Water" | Batson; Sia Furler; Keys; Napier | 4:59 |
| 27. | "No One" | Brothers; George Michael Harry; Keys | 4:38 |
| 28. | "All We Can Do Is Play" | Batson; Coles; Dean; Diggs; Hawkins; Keys; Martin; Woods | 0:41 |
| 29. | "Empire State of Mind" | Shawn Carter; Angela Hunte; Bert Keyes; Keys; Sylvia Robinson; Janette Sewell; Alexander Shuckburgh | 4:45 |
| 30. | "Kaleidoscope" (From the New Broadway Musical "Hell's Kitchen") (featuring Maleah Joi Moon) | Ben Diehl; Isaac; Keys; Gamal Lewis | 4:00 |
| Total length: | | | 60:34 |

Deluxe edition
| No. | Title | Writer(s) | Length |
|---|---|---|---|
| 31. | "The River" (Alicia's Version) | Alicia Keys; Johnny McDaid | 3:30 |
| 32. | "If I Ain't Got You" (Tank's Version) | Keys | 4:05 |
| 33. | "Not Even the King" (Tank's Version) | Keys; Emeli Sandé | 3:26 |
| Total length: | | | 60:45 |

== Personnel ==
Credits were adapted from AllMusic.

- Adam Blackstone – composer
- Alexander Shuckburgh – composer
- Alicia Keys – composer, primary artist
- Angela Hunte – composer
- Ben Diehl – composer
- Bert Keyes – composer
- Brandon Victor Dixon – primary artist
- Breyan Isaac – composer
- Candice Nelson – composer
- Carl Hampton – composer
- Chris Lee – primary artist
- Coleridge Tillman – composer
- Corey Woods – composer
- Dennis Coles – composer
- Drake – composer
- Emeli Sandé – composer
- Erika Rose Santoro – composer
- Gamal Lewis – composer
- George Michael Harry – composer
- Harold Lilly – composer
- Harold Spencer Jr. Lilly – composer
- Jack Splash – composer
- Jackie Leon – primary artist
- James Napier – composer
- James Smith – composer
- Janette Sewell – composer
- Jeff Bhasker – composer
- John Roger Stephens – composer
- Johnny McDaid – composer
- Jonny Coffer – composer
- Josephine Bridges – composer
- Kanye West – composer
- Kasseem Dean – composer
- Kecia Lewis – primary artist
- Kenneth Williams – composer
- Kerry Brothers – composer
- Lamont Hawkins – composer
- Lorrance Dopson – composer
- Maleah Joi Moon – primary artist
- Mark Batson – composer
- Mark Christopher Batson – composer
- Melvin Kent – composer
- Nicki Minaj – composer
- Noah Shebib – composer
- Noel Zancanella – composer
- Pharrell Williams – composer
- Ralph Bailey – composer
- Robert Diggs – composer
- Ryan Tedder – composer
- Salaam Remi – composer
- Samuel Elliot Roman – composer
- Shawn Carter – composer
- Shawn Martin – composer
- Shoshana Bean – primary artist
- Sia Furler – composer
- Stacy Barthe – composer
- Swizz Beatz – composer
- Sylvia Robinson – composer
- Timothy Mosley – composer
- Tom Nixon – composer
- Vanessa Ferguson – composer, primary artist
- Walter Milsap III – composer
- William Squier – composer

== Charts ==
Chart performance
| Chart (2024) | Peak position |
|---|---|
| US Cast Albums (Billboard) | 1 |

== Release history ==
Release dates and formats
| Region | Date | Format(s) | Label | Ref. |
|---|---|---|---|---|
| Various | June 7, 2024 | CD; digital download; streaming | Alicia Keys | |
| Various | May 19, 2025 | Digital download; streaming | Alicia Keys | |
