= 77th Tony Awards =

2024 US theatrical awards ceremony

- Date: June 16, 2024
- Venue: David H. Koch Theater
- Hosted by: Ariana DeBose

Highlights
- Most wins: Stereophonic (5)
- Most nominations: Hell's Kitchen and Stereophonic (13)
- Website: tonyawards.com

Television/radio coverage
- Network: CBS; Paramount+ Pluto TV
- Viewership: 3.5 million
- Produced by: Ricky Kirshner; Glenn Weiss
- Directed by: Glenn Weiss

The 77th Tony Awards were held on June 16, 2024, to recognize achievement in Broadway productions during the 2023–24 season. The ceremony was held at Lincoln Center's David H. Koch Theater in New York City, and aired on CBS. Ariana DeBose hosted for the third year in a row.

Having already become the most nominated play in the history of the ceremony, Stereophonic went on to win 5 awards, including Best Play, winning the most awards of the season. The musical adaptation of The Outsiders, which won Best Musical, garnered 4 awards in total, as did the Best Revival of a Musical recipient Merrily We Roll Along; the closest to those three shows - in terms of awards received - was Appropriate, which garnered three, including Best Revival of a Play.

For the first time in the history of the ceremony, all eight winners in the performance categories were receiving the award for the first time, with six of them winning for their first career nomination.

== Ceremony information ==
Pluto TV streamed the pre-ceremony broadcast The Tony Awards: Act One, hosted by Julianne Hough and Utkarsh Ambudkar. The nominees for the 77th Tony Awards were announced on April 30, 2024, at 8:30 a.m. ET by Jesse Tyler Ferguson and Renée Elise Goldsberry.

== Eligibility ==
The Tony Awards eligibility dates for the 2023-2024 Broadway season were April 28, 2023, through April 25, 2024. Productions must meet all other eligibility requirements as set forth by the American Theatre Wing and the Broadway League. There are 41 legitimate Broadway-eligible theaters in which a production must be performed in to attain eligibility for award consideration. Nominations for the 2024 Tony Awards were announced on April 30, 2024.

Original plays

- The Cottage
- Grey House
- I Need That
- Jaja's African Hair Braiding
- Mary Jane
- Mother Play
- Patriots
- Prayer for the French Republic
- The Shark Is Broken
- Stereophonic

Original musicals

- Back to the Future: The Musical
- Days of Wine and Roses
- The Great Gatsby
- Harmony
- The Heart of Rock and Roll
- Hell's Kitchen
- Here Lies Love
- How to Dance in Ohio
- Illinoise
- Lempicka
- The Notebook
- Once Upon a One More Time
- The Outsiders
- Suffs
- Water for Elephants

Play revivals

- Appropriate
- Doubt: A Parable
- An Enemy of the People
- Purlie Victorious: A Non-Confederate
  Romp through the Cotton Patch
- Uncle Vanya

Musical revivals

- Cabaret
- Gutenberg! The Musical!
- Merrily We Roll Along
- Spamalot
- The Who's Tommy
- The Wiz

== Winners and nominations ==
=== Awards ===
Best Play ‡	Best Musical ‡
Stereophonic; Jaja's African Hair Braiding; Mary Jane; Mother Play; Prayer for the French Republic	The Outsiders; Hell's Kitchen; Illinoise; Suffs; Water for Elephants
Best Revival of a Play ‡	Best Revival of a Musical ‡
Appropriate; An Enemy of the People; Purlie Victorious: A Non-Confederate Romp through the Cotton Patch	Merrily We Roll Along; Cabaret at the Kit Kat Club; Gutenberg! The Musical!; The Who's Tommy
Best Actor in a Play	Best Actress in a Play
Jeremy Strong – An Enemy of the People as Doctor Thomas Stockmann; William Jackson Harper – Uncle Vanya as Astrov; Leslie Odom Jr. – Purlie Victorious: A Non-Confederate Romp through the Cotton Patch as Purlie Victorious Judson; Liev Schreiber – Doubt: A Parable as Father Brendan Flynn; Michael Stuhlbarg – Patriots as Boris Berezovsky	Sarah Paulson – Appropriate as Antoinette "Toni" Lafayette; Betsy Aidem – Prayer for the French Republic as Marcelle Salomon Benhamou; Jessica Lange – Mother Play as Phyllis; Rachel McAdams – Mary Jane as Mary Jane; Amy Ryan – Doubt: A Parable as Sister Aloysius Beauvier
Best Actor in a Musical	Best Actress in a Musical
Jonathan Groff – Merrily We Roll Along as Franklin Shephard; Brody Grant – The Outsiders as Ponyboy Curtis; Dorian Harewood – The Notebook as Noah Calhoun (older); Brian d'Arcy James – Days of Wine and Roses as Joseph "Joe" Clay; Eddie Redmayne – Cabaret at the Kit Kat Club as the Emcee	Maleah Joi Moon – Hell's Kitchen as Ali; Eden Espinosa – Lempicka as Tamara de Lempicka; Kelli O'Hara – Days of Wine and Roses as Kirsten Arnesen-Clay; Maryann Plunkett – The Notebook as Allison "Allie" Calhoun (older); Gayle Rankin – Cabaret at the Kit Kat Club as Sally Bowles
Best Featured Actor in a Play	Best Featured Actress in a Play
Will Brill – Stereophonic as Reg; Eli Gelb – Stereophonic as Grover; Jim Parsons – Mother Play as Carl; Tom Pecinka – Stereophonic as Peter; Corey Stoll – Appropriate as Beauregard "Bo" Lafayette	Kara Young – Purlie Victorious: A Non-Confederate Romp through the Cotton Patch as Lutiebelle Gussie Mae Jenkins; Quincy Tyler Bernstine – Doubt: A Parable as Mrs. Muller; Juliana Canfield – Stereophonic as Holly; Celia Keenan-Bolger – Mother Play as Martha; Sarah Pidgeon – Stereophonic as Diana
Best Featured Actor in a Musical	Best Featured Actress in a Musical
Daniel Radcliffe – Merrily We Roll Along as Charley Kringas; Roger Bart – Back to the Future: The Musical as Doc Brown; Joshua Boone – The Outsiders as Dallas “Dally” Winston; Brandon Victor Dixon – Hell's Kitchen as Davis; Sky Lakota-Lynch – The Outsiders as Johnny Cade; Steven Skybell – Cabaret at the Kit Kat Club as Herr Schultz	Kecia Lewis – Hell's Kitchen as Miss Liza Jane; Shoshana Bean – Hell's Kitchen as Jersey; Amber Iman – Lempicka as Rafaela; Nikki M. James – Suffs as Ida B. Wells; Leslie Rodriguez Kritzer – Monty Python's Spamalot as the Lady of the Lake; Lindsay Mendez – Merrily We Roll Along as Mary Flynn; Bebe Neuwirth – Cabaret at the Kit Kat Club as Fraulein Schneider
Best Direction of a Play	Best Direction of a Musical
Daniel Aukin – Stereophonic; Anne Kauffman – Mary Jane; Kenny Leon – Purlie Victorious: A Non-Confederate Romp through the Cotton Patch; Lila Neugebauer – Appropriate; Whitney White – Jaja's African Hair Braiding	Danya Taymor – The Outsiders; Maria Friedman – Merrily We Roll Along; Michael Greif – Hell's Kitchen; Leigh Silverman – Suffs; Jessica Stone – Water for Elephants
Best Book of a Musical	Best Original Score (Music and/or Lyrics) Written for the Theatre
Shaina Taub – Suffs; Kristoffer Diaz – Hell's Kitchen; Bekah Brunstetter – The Notebook; Justin Levine and Adam Rapp – The Outsiders; Rick Elice – Water for Elephants	Suffs – Shaina Taub (music and lyrics); Days of Wine and Roses – Adam Guettel (music and lyrics); Here Lies Love – David Byrne and Fatboy Slim (music and lyrics); Stereophonic – Will Butler (original songs by); The Outsiders – Jamestown Revival (Zach Chance and Jonathan Clay) and Justin Levine (music and lyrics)
Best Scenic Design of a Play	Best Scenic Design of a Musical
David Zinn – Stereophonic; dots – Appropriate; dots – An Enemy of the People; Derek McLane – Purlie Victorious: A Non-Confederate Romp through the Cotton Patch; David Zinn – Jaja's African Hair Braiding	Tom Scutt – Cabaret at the Kit Kat Club; AMP featuring Tatiana Kahvegian – The Outsiders; Robert Brill and Peter Nigrini – Hell's Kitchen; Takeshi Kata – Water for Elephants; David Korins – Here Lies Love; Tim Hatley and Finn Ross – Back to the Future: The Musical; Riccardo Hernández and Peter Nigrini – Lempicka
Best Costume Design of a Play	Best Costume Design of a Musical
Dede Ayite – Jaja's African Hair Braiding; Dede Ayite – Appropriate; Enver Chakartash – Stereophonic; Emilio Sosa – Purlie Victorious: A Non-Confederate Romp through the Cotton Patch; David Zinn – An Enemy of the People	Linda Cho – The Great Gatsby; Dede Ayite – Hell's Kitchen; David Israel Reynoso – Water for Elephants; Tom Scutt – Cabaret at the Kit Kat Club; Paul Tazewell – Suffs
Best Lighting Design of a Play	Best Lighting Design of a Musical
Jane Cox – Appropriate; Isabella Byrd – An Enemy of the People; Amith Chandrashaker – Prayer for the French Republic; Jiyoun Chang – Stereophonic; Natasha Katz – Grey House	Hana S. Kim and Brian MacDevitt – The Outsiders; Brandon Stirling Baker – Illinoise; David Bengali and Bradley King – Water for Elephants; Isabella Byrd – Cabaret at the Kit Kat Club; Natasha Katz – Hell's Kitchen
Best Sound Design of a Play	Best Sound Design of a Musical
Ryan Rumery – Stereophonic; Stefania Bulbarella and Justin Ellington – Jaja's African Hair Braiding; Leah Gelpe – Mary Jane; Tom Gibbons – Grey House; Will Pickens and Bray Poor – Appropriate	Cody Spencer – The Outsiders; M. L. Dogg and Cody Spencer – Here Lies Love; Kai Harada – Merrily We Roll Along; Nick Lidster for Autograph – Cabaret at the Kit Kat Club; Gareth Owen – Hell's Kitchen
Best Choreography	Best Orchestrations
Justin Peck – Illinoise; Camille A. Brown – Hell's Kitchen; Shana Carroll and Jesse Robb – Water for Elephants; Jeff Kuperman and Rick Kuperman – The Outsiders; Annie-B Parson – Here Lies Love	Jonathan Tunick – Merrily We Roll Along; Adam Blackstone and Tom Kitt – Hell's Kitchen; Will Butler and Justin Craig – Stereophonic; Matt Hinkley, Justin Levine, and Jamestown Revival (Zach Chance and Jonathan Clay) – The Outsiders; Timo Andres – Illinoise

‡ The award is presented to the producer(s) of the musical or play.

=== Non-competitive awards ===
Names	Accolade
Jack O'Brien	Lifetime Achievement in the Theatre
George C. Wolfe	Lifetime Achievement in the Theatre
Billy Porter (Note: for his activism in the LGBTQIA+ community, particularly with the Elizabeth Taylor AIDS Foundation and the Entertainment Community Fund.)	Isabelle Stevenson Award
Alex Edelman (Note: for his "exemplary debut" in his solo show Just for Us)	Special Tony Awards
Abe Jacob (Note: for his contributions to modern sound design in theater)	Special Tony Awards
Nikiya Mathis (Note: for her hair and wig design for the play Jaja's African Hair Braiding.)	Special Tony Awards
Wendall K. Harrington	Tony Honors for Excellence in Theatre
Colleen Jennings-Roggensack (Note: ASU Gammage Executive Director and Broadway League member)	Tony Honors for Excellence in Theatre
outgoing Playwrights Horizons Board Chair Judith O. Rubin	Tony Honors for Excellence in Theatre
the Dramatists Guild Foundation	Tony Honors for Excellence in Theatre
the Samuel J. Friedman Health Center for the Performing Arts.	Tony Honors for Excellence in Theatre
The Wilma Theater in Philadelphia	Regional Theatre Tony Award.
CJay Philip from Dance & BMore in Baltimore, Maryland	Excellence in Theatre Education Award.

== Multiple nominations and awards ==
=== Productions with multiple nominations and awards ===
Nominations	Awards	Production
13	2	Hell's Kitchen
13	5	Stereophonic
12	4	The Outsiders
9	1	Cabaret at the Kit Kat Club
8	3	Appropriate
7	4	Merrily We Roll Along
7	0	Water for Elephants
6	1	Purlie Victorious: A Non-Confederate Romp through the Cotton Patch
6	2	Suffs
5	1	An Enemy of the People
5	1	Jaja's African Hair Braiding
4	0	Here Lies Love
4	1	Illinoise
4	0	Mary Jane
4	0	Mother Play
3	0	Days of Wine and Roses
3	0	Doubt: A Parable
3	0	Lempicka
3	0	The Notebook
3	0	Prayer for the French Republic
2	0	Back to the Future: The Musical
2	0	Grey House

=== Individuals with multiple nominations and awards ===
Nominations	Awards	Individual
3	0	Justin Levine
3	1	David Zinn
3	1	Dede Ayite
2	0	Will Butler
2	0	Isabella Byrd
2	0	Natasha Katz
2	0	Peter Nigrini
2	0	Jamestown Revival (Zach Chance and Jonathan Clay)
2	1	Tom Scutt
2	2	Shaina Taub

== Presenters and performers ==
Presenters
Names	Notes
Taraji P. Henson	presented Best Actor in a Play
Danai Gurira	introduced a performance from Alicia Keys, Jay-Z & the cast of Hell's Kitchen
Jesse Tyler Ferguson	presented Best Featured Actor in a Play
Pete Townshend	introduced a performance from the cast of The Who's Tommy
Taylor Tomlinson & Wendell Pierce	presented Best Featured Actress in a Play
Ashley Park & Renée Elise Goldsberry	presented Best Direction of a Play & Best Direction of a Musical
Patrick Wilson	introduced a performance from the cast of Water for Elephants
Anthony Ramos & Ben Platt	presented Best Featured Actor in a Musical & Best Featured Actress in a Musical
Julianne Hough	introduced a performance from the cast of Illinoise
Utkarsh Ambudkar	presented Best Score
Andrew Rannells & Josh Gad	introduced Jim Parsons
Jim Parsons	presented Best Revival of a Play
Tamara Tunie	introduced Nate Burleson & Solomon Thomas
Nate Burleson & Solomon Thomas	introduced Jeffrey Wright
Jeffrey Wright	presented Best Play
Hillary Clinton	introduced a performance from the cast of Suffs
Angelina Jolie	introduced a performance from the cast of The Outsiders
Jennifer Hudson	presented Best Revival of a Musical
Sean Hayes	presented Best Actress in a Play
Brooke Shields	introduced Nicole Scherzinger & the "In Memoriam" tribute
Nick Jonas & Adrienne Warren	presented Best Actress in a Musical & Best Actor in a Musical
Cynthia Erivo & Idina Menzel	presented Best Musical

Performances

Performers
Names	Song(s)
The cast of Hell's Kitchen (with Alicia Keys and Jay-Z)	"The Gospel" / "Authors of Forever" / "Fallin'" "Empire State of Mind (Part II) Broken Down" / "Empire State of Mind"
The cast of The Who's Tommy (with Pete Townshend)	"See Me, Feel Me" / "Pinball Wizard"
Daniel Radcliffe, Jonathan Groff, and Lindsay Mendez (from Merrily We Roll Along)	"Second Transition" / "Old Friends"
The cast of Water for Elephants	"Anywhere/Another Train" / "The Road Don't Make You Young"
The ensemble of Illinoise	"The Predatory Wasp of the Palisades Is Out to Get Us!"
The cast of Stereophonic	"Masquerade"
Eddie Redmayne and the cast of Cabaret	"Wilkommen"
The cast of Suffs	"Keep Marching"
The cast of The Outsiders	"Tulsa '67" / "Grease Got a Hold" / "The Rumble"
Nicole Scherzinger (In Memoriam)	"What I Did for Love"

== Controversy ==
Despite receiving a record 13 nominations to become the most nominated play in Tonys history, and other plays with music such as Choir Boy receiving musical performances on the broadcast, Stereophonic was not originally among the lineup of performing shows announced on June 6, with playwright David Adjmi saying "We wanted to perform, but they weren't into it." In an interview with The Hollywood Reporter, producer Glenn Weiss said, "There's a lot of speculation and people forming their own judgments and opinions, and we are trying on our show to represent the season as well as we possibly can with the time that we have." On June 12, Stereophonic was announced to be performing at the ceremony.

Days before the ceremony, it was announced that many Broadway press outlets were denied access to the red carpet for coverage including SiriusXM’s On Broadway's Julie James, BroadwayWorld’s Richard Ridge, TheaterMania's David Gordon, Broadway News’ Ruthie Fierberg, and Theatrely's Kobi Kassal. Eventually the decision was reversed after public outcry, an open letter from the Editor-in-Chief of Theatrely, and multiple news articles called out the decision.

== Reception ==
=== Reviews ===
The night's performances received mixed reviews. Alicia Keys's live performance of "Empire State of Mind", with the cast of Hell's Kitchen onstage and Jay-Z joining remotely, was noted as a highlight by the live audience and by critics. The opening number featuring Ariana DeBose, on the other hand, drew criticism. The awards were celebrated for more strongly featuring straight plays than in past years, with clips and interviews preceding awards in play categories.

=== Ratings ===
The ceremony drew 3.5 million viewers on CBS, marking a 14% decrease from the previous year's ceremony.

=== Accolades ===
The broadcast was nominated for a 2025 GLAAD Media Award for Outstanding Variety or Talk Show Episode.

== In Memoriam ==
Nicole Scherzinger performed What I Did for Love From The Musical A Chorus Line.

- Hinton Battle
- Alan Arkin
- Glynis Johns
- Arthur Rubin
- Christopher Durang
- Bill Kenwright
- Michael McGrath
- Carrie Robbins
- Clifton Oliver
- Tanya Berezin
- Edgar Lansbury
- Mattew Serino
- Ellen Holly
- Robert Nolan
- Frances Sternhagen
- Chris Peluso
- Franne Lee
- Inga Swenson
- Ira Bernstein
- Richard M. Sherman
- Irio O'Farrill
- Janis Paige
- Jeffrey Fender
- Ron Simons
- Linda Balgord
- Alan Eisenberg
- Samm-Art Williams
- Pamela Blair
- Joanna Merlin
- Luigi Caiola
- Marilyn S. Miller
- Michael Gambon
- Mbongeni Ngema
- Michael Blakemore
- Nicolas Coster
- Pat Halloran
- Richard Pilbrow
- Rose Gregorio
- Sheldon Harnick
- Treat Williams
- Steven Lutvak
- Maurice Hines
- Thomas J. Gates
- Tom Jones
- Glenda Jackson
- Louis Gossett Jr.
- Ron Cephas Jones
- Martin McCallum
- Robert Brustein
- Fred Werner
- Chita Rivera

== See also ==
- Drama Desk Awards
- Outer Critics Circle Awards
- Laurence Olivier Awards
- New York Drama Critics' Circle
- Theatre World Award
- Lucille Lortel Awards
- Obie Award
- Drama League Award
- Chita Rivera Awards for Dance and Choreography
