= Kaleidoscope (Alicia Keys song) =

Single by Alicia Keys and Maleah Joi Moon

from the album Hell's Kitchen (Original Broadway Cast Recording)
- Released: March 22, 2024
- Recorded: 2023
- Studio: Jungle City Studios (New York, NY)
- Genre: R&B
- Length: 4:00
- Label: AKW
- Songwriters: Ben Billions; Breyan Isaac; Alicia Keys; Gamal Kosh Lewis
- Producers: Breyan Isaac; Alicia Keys

Alicia Keys singles chronology
"Lifeline" (2023)	"Kaleidoscope" (2024)	"Finally" (2024)

Music video
- "Kaleidoscope" on YouTube

"Kaleidoscope" was released on March 22, 2024, through AKW Records as the lead single from the soundtrack album of the 2024 Broadway musical Hell's Kitchen. The song is performed by American singer-songwriter Alicia Keys and stage actress Maleah Joi Moon.

== Background and release ==
In June 2023, Keys announced she had written her first jukebox musical Hell's Kitchen inspired by her own life and career in New York City. The play features some of Keys's best known songs, as well as new music written by Keys specifically for the play: "River," "Seventeen," and "Kaleidoscope".

The Off-Broadway musical ran from October 24, 2023, to January 14, 2024, as part of The Public Theater's 2023–24 season. On December 4, 2023, Alicia Keys announced that the production will transfer to the Shubert Theatre on Broadway. The song was official released the lead single from the Broadway musical soundtrack album on March 22, 2024.

== Composition ==
In an interview for Entertainment Weekly Keys explained the meaning of the song and its composition process:

"It's that feeling when everything is spectacular and there's this moment that becomes illuminated. "Kaleidoscope" was one of those where we knew that it wanted to feel joyful and fun. It started one way, and as we went on, we realized, "You know what? We need a whole dance." So, how are we going to add this increased musicality so that they can be feeling that essence of this kaleidoscopic feeling? Each time it grows and grows and grows."

== Live performances ==
The song was firstly performed during Hell's Kitchen's Off-Broadway premiere on October 24, 2023, at The Public Theater. On March 22, 2024, Alicia Keys performed the song with the musical lead actress Maleah Joi Moon and the casts at The Tonight Show Starring Jimmy Fallon. Maliah Joi Moon and the cast of Hell's Kitchen performed the song on Today on May 14, 2023.

== Music video ==
The official music video was published on Keys's YouTube account on April 12, 2024. The video featured Keys herself, Maleah Joi Moon and the casts of Hell's Kitchen and was filmed at Manhattan Plaza in New York City.

== Credits and personnel ==
Adapted from Kaleidoscope liner notes.

Personnel

- Written by Ben Billions, Breyan Isaac, Alicia Keys, Gamal Kosh Lewis
- Produced by Breyan Isaac and Alicia Keys
- Co-produced by Adam Blackstone
- Lead vocals: Alicia Keys and Maleah Joi Moon
- Background vocals: Chad Carstarphen, Vanessa Ferguson, Jakeim Hart, Jackie Leon, Lamont Walker II, Rema Webb, Nyseli Vega
- Engineered by Dave Kutch, Ann Mincieli and Brendan Morawski
- Assistant engineer: Frank Holland, Steven Tejeda and Roberto Regeiro
- Mixed by Ken Lewis
