= Maleah Joi Moon =

American singer and actress

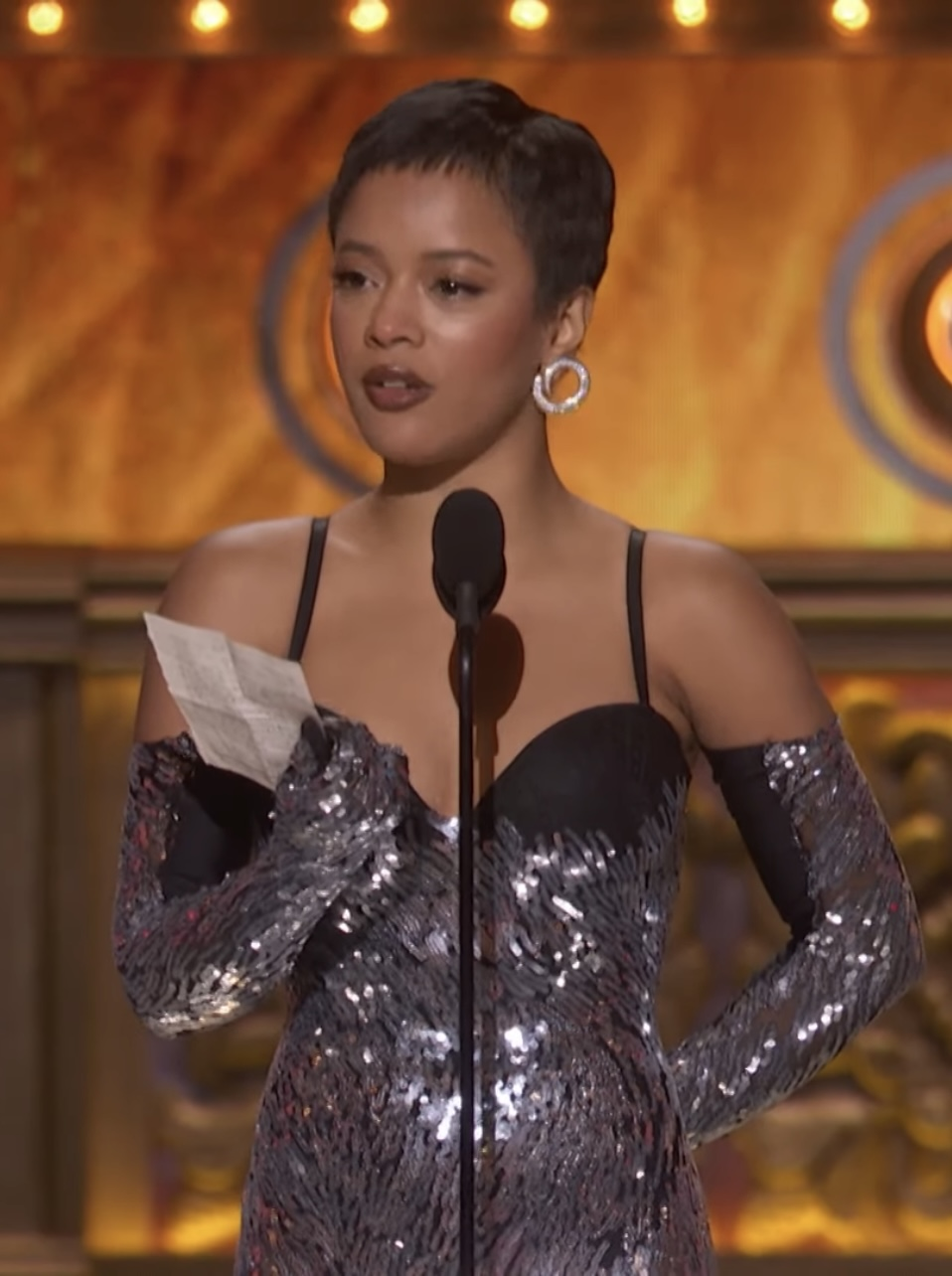
- Moon at the 77th Tony Awards in 2024
- Born: September 22, 2002 (age 24); Franklin Township, New Jersey, U.S.
- Education: Franklin High School
- Occupations: Actress, singer
- Years active: 2020–present

Maleah Joi Moon (born September 22, 2002) is an American singer and actress, known primarily for her work on the stage. She rose to fame for her role of Ali in Alicia Keys' musical Hell's Kitchen, for which she won a Tony Award for Best Actress in a Musical, a Drama Desk Award and a Theatre World Award. Moon won the Grammy Award for Best Musical Theater Album for the play's accompanying album. In 2023, The New York Times listed Moon on its list of 2023 Theater Artists to Watch This Fall.

== Life and career ==
Moon was born and raised in Franklin Township, Somerset County, New Jersey, where she graduated from Franklin High School in 2020. During her studies, she attended theater and singing classes taught by Timothy Walton and Franklin Township. In sixth grade, she played the lead role of Dorothy in the school play The Wizard of Oz.

In 2022, Moon was cast for her first television role in the Disney show Disney Television Discovers: Talent Showcase. In 2023, she portrayed Brook in Marlo Hunter's television film Mystic Christmas, acting alongside Jessy Schram and Chandler Massey.

In 2023, Moon took part in auditions for Alicia Keys' Off-Broadway musical Hell's Kitchen, where she was selected for the lead role of Ali. Her co-stars included Shoshana Bean, Kecia Lewis, Crystal Monee Hall and Brandon Victor Dixon. The musical took place at The Public Theater from November 2023 to January 2024, receiving mostly positive reviews from critics, praising Moon's performance. The following year, Moon was confirmed for her role in the Broadway production at the Shubert Theatre. On March 22, 2024, Moon performed the musical's original song "Kaleidoscope" with Alicia Keys and the cast on The Tonight Show Starring Jimmy Fallon. For her performance, Moon was nominated for the Lucille Lortel Awards and won a Tony Award for Best Performance by a Leading Actress in a Musical, a Drama Desk Award and a Theatre World Award.

On May 6, 2024, Moon made her Met Gala debut wearing Collina Strada.

== Filmography ==
Year	Title	Role	Notes
2022	Disney Television Discovers: Talent Showcase	Faye	Season 2; Ep. 2
2023	Mystic Christmas	Brooke	TV Movie
2024	The Tonight Show Starring Jimmy Fallon	Herself	Performance with Alicia Keys
2026	A Different World (2026)	Deborah Wayne	Main role

== Stage credits ==
=== Broadway productions ===
Title	Years	Role	Location	Notes
Hell's Kitchen	2024	Ali	Shubert Theatre	Written by Kristoffer Diaz, Directed by Michael Greif, Music by Alicia Keys

=== Off-Broadway productions ===
Title	Years	Role	Location	Notes
Hell's Kitchen	2024	Ali	The Public Theater	Stage musical; Written by Kristoffer Diaz, Directed by Michael Greif, Music by Alicia Keys

== Awards and nominations ==
Date of ceremony	Award	Category	Nominee(s)	Result	Ref.
2024	Lucille Lortel Awards	Outstanding Lead Performer in a Musical	Hell's Kitchen	Nominated	
2024	Drama Desk Awards	Outstanding Lead Performance in a Musical	Hell's Kitchen	Won	
2024	Theatre World Award		Hell's Kitchen	Won	
2024	Tony Awards	Best Actress in a Musical	Hell's Kitchen	Won	
2025	Grammy Awards	Best Musical Theater Album	Hell's Kitchen	Won	

== See also ==
- African-American Tony nominees and winners
