= Jonathan Clay =

Jonathan Clay may refer to:

- Jon Clay, British cyclist
- Jonathan Clay (musician), American singer-songwriter
