= Chris Goode (playwright) =

British playwright (1973–2021)

Chris Goode (27 May 1973 – 1 June 2021) was a British playwright, theatre director, performer, and poet. He was the artistic director of Camden People's Theatre from 2001 to 2004, and led the ensemble Chris Goode and Company until its closure in 2021. His second theatre company was named Ponyboy Curtis, after the protagonist of S. E. Hinton's 1967 novel The Outsiders. Kate Bassett, the theatre critic for The Independent, said he was known as "British theatre's greatest maverick talent"

A regular performer at the Edinburgh Festival Fringe, he won four Fringe First awards for Men in the Cities, Monkey Bars, Neutrino and Kiss of Life. His commission for Queer Up North festival resulted in "The Adventures of Wound Man and Shirley". The Face characterised his work as "either community-focused or one-man shows, in which he performed stories of suicide, bruised men and homosexuality. Praise rolled in from Britain’s biggest critics, along with industry accolades".

Goode hosted the regular podcast Thompson's Live, in which he curated discussions with other theatre artists about their practice.

His plays are published by Oberon Books.

After his death, it was revealed that he used his professional status to abuse and disguise his abuse of young men.

== Personal life ==
Goode was gay and married sound designer and theatre artist Griffyn Gilligan (born 1994) in July 2018.

Goode died by suicide on 1 June 2021. He had been arrested on 5 May for possession of indecent images of children.

== Work ==
=== Solo shows ===
- Mirabel (2018). Premiered at Ovalhouse Theatre, London.
- Men in the Cities (2014). Premiered at Traverse Theatre, Edinburgh.
- God/Head (2012). Premiered at Ovalhouse Theatre, London.
- The Adventures of Wound Man and Shirley (2009). Premiered at Contact Theatre, Manchester.
- Hippo World Guest Book (2007). Premiered at Pleasance Dome, Edinburgh.

=== As playwright ===
- Mad Man (2014). Premiered at The Drum, Theatre Royal Plymouth.
- Infinite Lives (2014). Premiered at Tobacco Factory Theatre, Bristol.
- Monkey Bars (2012). Premiered at Traverse Theatre, Edinburgh.
- The Loss of All Things (2011). Part of the Bush Theatre's Sixty-Six Books.
- King Pelican (2009). Premiered at The Drum, Theatre Royal Plymouth.
- Speed Death of the Radiant Child (2007) Premiered at The Drum, Theatre Royal Plymouth. Revived at the Warwick Arts Centre (2017).

=== As director ===
- Jubilee (2017) adapted from Derek Jarman. Premiered at Manchester Royal Exchange Theatre.
- Every One (2016) by Jo Clifford. Premiered at Battersea Arts Centre.
- Landscape and Monologue (2011) by Harold Pinter. Premiered at the Ustinov Studio, Theatre Royal Bath.
- Glass House (2009). Premiered in the Clore Studio, Royal Opera House.
