= The Outsiders (musical) =

2023 musical based on novel by S.E. Hinton

The Outsiders: A New Musical
- Broadway promotional poster, featuring the original cast.
- Music: Jonathan Clay; Zach Chance; Justin Levine
- Lyrics: Jonathan Clay; Zach Chance; Justin Levine
- Book: Adam Rapp; Justin Levine
- Basis: The Outsiders by S. E. Hinton; The Outsiders by Kathleen Rowell
- Premiere: February 19, 2023: La Jolla Playhouse
- Productions: 2024 Broadway; 2025 North American Tour
- Awards: Tony Award for Best Musical

The Outsiders: A New Musical, also known as The Outsiders, is a 2023 coming-of-age musical with music and lyrics by Jonathan Clay and Zach Chance from the folk rock band Jamestown Revival alongside Justin Levine and a book by Adam Rapp and Levine. It is based on The Outsiders, first published in 1967 and written by S. E. Hinton, and on its 1983 film adaptation written by Kathleen Rowell and directed by Francis Ford Coppola. It is the second stage adaptation of Hinton's novel, following the 1990 play by Christopher Sergel.

The musical, told from the perspective of 14-year-old Ponyboy Curtis, is set in Tulsa, Oklahoma, during the 1960s and follows the conflict between two rival gangs divided by their socioeconomic status: the working-class "Greasers" and the upper-middle-class "Socs" (pronounced /ˈsoʊʃɪz/ SOH-shiz—short for Socialites).

The musical received twelve nominations at the 77th Tony Awards and won four awards, including Best Musical. Additionally, the musical's cast album was nominated for Grammy Award for Best Musical Theater Album.

== Plot ==
=== Act I ===
Ponyboy Curtis, aged 14, is writing in a notebook, when he begins to introduce the world of the show — Tulsa, Oklahoma in 1967. He introduces his eldest brother Darrel "Darry" who used to be a football star with "a ticket out," and his middle brother Sodapop "Soda", who recently had his heart broken. He introduces the Greasers, the more gritty, grounded counterparts to the upper-class Socs who "live like socialites." He specifically points out his best friend, Greaser Johnny Cade, who was recently jumped by Socs ("Tulsa, '67").

Ponyboy is jumped by the same Socs who attacked Johnny, led by their ringleader, Robert "Bob" Sheldon. When the Socs attempt to cut Ponyboy's hair to make him look like a Soc, Ponyboy bites Bob, and then gets knocked unconscious. He wakes up to his brothers cleaning him up. The other Greasers — led by Dallas "Dally" Winston, who just got out of county lockup — tell Ponyboy that he has officially become a Greaser, having gotten through this experience and come out the other end. Darrel worries that Ponyboy is making an irresponsible choice in cementing himself as a Greaser, but Dally makes it official anyway ("Grease Got a Hold").

Darrel is at home folding laundry, reflecting on his role as a pseudo-father to his younger brothers after their parents recently died in a car accident, as the rest of the gang make themselves comfortable in the Curtis house ("Runs in the Family"). Ponyboy comes home and asks Darrel if he can go to the drive-in with Johnny, Dally and fellow Greaser Keith "Two-Bit" Mathews. Darrel agrees, as long as Ponyboy stays careful and isn't late for curfew, though he's still wary of Dally. Ponyboy and Soda discuss how Darrel's in a hard place right now, and Ponyboy asks his brother if, like himself, he dreams about his parents' accident. Soda says no, before asking Ponyboy about the book he's reading, Great Expectations. The brothers discuss their similarities with the novel's characters, and after Soda goes to sleep, Ponyboy keeps reading and following this train of thought ("Great Expectations").

Meanwhile, Dally finds Johnny outside his house, with sounds of intense arguing from inside. After it becomes clear this has happened before, Johnny tells Dally that he stays at home because he's scared his father will kill his mother. Dally offers to go inside the house himself, but Johnny doesn't let him. Dally gives Johnny a cigarette for warmth, a Hershey Bar, and his switchblade, which he teaches Johnny how to use.

The next day, Dally, Johnny, and Ponyboy all go to the drive-in, which is full of Socs. There, they meet Sherri "Cherry" Valance, who is seeing Bob. ("Friday at the Drive-in"). Dally keeps hitting on Cherry, claiming she's "not as innocent" as she may seem. Johnny tries to stop him, angering Dally. Dally continues provoking Cherry, and she throws her coke on him. After Dally leaves, Cherry and her friend Marcia invite Ponyboy and Johnny to sit with them, before eventually asking Ponyboy to escort her to the concession stand. There, the two begin talking and realize that the other isn't exactly as stereotypes led them to believe — Cherry is dealing with fighting and demanding parents, and Ponyboy likes books and watching the sky change colors as the sun sets ("I Could Talk to You All Night").

Bob storms in, and he tries to tell Cherry not to talk to Greasers, leading to an altercation between the two groups — notably between Bob and Two-Bit. Cherry stops them from fighting but breaks up with Bob in doing so. Bob — who is clearly drunk — threatens Ponyboy. Cherry tells Ponyboy not to take it the wrong way if she doesn't say hello to him at school. Ponyboy and Johnny arrive at the Curtis home, late for curfew. An enraged Darrel begins shouting at his younger brother, and Ponyboy fights back. Soda is unable to quell the argument. As tensions escalate, Darrel slaps Ponyboy ("Runs in the Family" (reprise)). Ponyboy and Johnny run away. They sit and contemplate what could be next for them, dreaming of running far away ("Far Away From Tulsa").

Ponyboy and Johnny are stopped by the Socs, led by Bob. A fight breaks out, and it escalates quickly. The Socs attempt to drown Ponyboy in a water fountain, but before they can finish the job, Johnny stabs Bob with the blade Dally gave him, killing the Soc. By the time Ponyboy regains consciousness, the other Socs have fled. Ponyboy and Johnny run to Buck Merril's Bar searching for Dally, who gives them money and directions to an abandoned church where they can hide for the time being. Ponyboy and Johnny do as they're told ("Run Run Brother").

=== Act II ===
In Tulsa, the Socs and police are searching for Ponyboy and Johnny, who the Socs told the police were responsible for Bob's death. Darrel and Soda are interrogated about what they know or who they know that might know more, with the police singling out Dally as a specific person of interest, though they receive no information from him. At the abandoned church, Ponyboy and Johnny see their photographs in the newspaper and decide that Ponyboy needs to cut and bleach his hair to make him less recognizable. Cherry struggles with the death of her boyfriend while acknowledging that he was not a good person. Paul Holden, a fellow Soc, mourns with Cherry before accusing her of antagonizing Bob into fighting Ponyboy. Paul and the Socs then declare war on the Greasers, beating up Two-Bit as a "message", and plan a fight for next Saturday night at the same park where Bob was killed. ("Justice for Tulsa").

At the church, Ponyboy reflects on how he feels that he brings death and bad luck to others and that Johnny should just leave him at the church and run away on his own. Johnny refuses, saying he will stick by Ponyboy no matter what. ("Death's at My Door"). Meanwhile, at the Curtis house, Dally tells Darrel and Soda that no one will find Ponyboy and Johnny, but Darrel blames Dally for being a bad influence on the two boys. Dally counters that he spends more time with Ponyboy than Darrel does. He prepares to strike Darrel, but Soda stops the fighting before it can escalate further. Dally backs off but walks away in anger. Darrel worries that he will never be able to help Ponyboy, and contemplates giving up. Soda reminds him that they don't give up on family. Ponyboy reflects on this from the church, on his own ("Throwing in the Towel").

Ponyboy recites a poem "Nothing Gold Can Stay" by Robert Frost to Johnny, as they watch the sunrise. Dally arrives at the church, and tells Ponyboy and Johnny that there are kids at the church having a field trip or picnic of some kind. He gives Ponyboy a letter from Soda about how the house isn't complete without Ponyboy. Darrel is seen on stage, representing his concern and love for Ponyboy as well. ("Soda's Letter"). Johnny decides he wants to return to Tulsa and turn himself in. Dally is adamant that this is a bad idea, telling the boys that it's always better to run away from trouble like he has. He also reveals that the Socs and Greasers' rivalry has only worsened and that there will soon be a rumble. The winner gets control over the park. During this conversation, Ponyboy throws a cigarette on the ground behind him.

Dally tells Ponyboy and Johnny that he is going to drive them to Iowa where someone is going to take them in. But before they can leave, the church catches on fire from the cigarette Ponyboy threw away. Ponyboy and Johnny run into the flames to rescue the kids Dally had mentioned earlier, turning them into local heroes back in Tulsa — where they return ("Hoods Turned Heroes"). Ponyboy ends up not badly injured, but a beam falls on Johnny's back, and he can no longer feel his legs. Dally says he will not be holding back at the rumble. Cherry comes to the hospital room and tells Ponyboy that she cleared him and Johnny of all murder charges by giving a statement to the police. She begs Ponyboy to not fight in the upcoming rumble ("Hopeless War").

Nevertheless, Ponyboy feels he has to fight for Johnny, and joins the Greasers in preparing for the rumble. Darrel shows up, ready to fight, and asks Ponyboy to let him fight on his behalf. Ponyboy still refuses, and all three Curtis brothers prepare to fight in the rumble ("Trouble"). Darrel and Paul — once best friends, now rivals — start fighting one-on-one, before everyone breaks out into an all-out fight. The Greasers and Socs brutally fight one another in the pouring rain, and eventually, the Greasers win. They go visit Johnny in the hospital after the fight. Johnny tells Ponyboy to "stay gold," and then dies. All the Greasers become emotional. Overwhelmed with grief, Dally storms out of the hospital. He runs to the train tracks and lets himself get hit by an oncoming train, killing him ("Little Brother").

Ponyboy is distraught, not speaking, and staring at the television while his brothers try to help him. They reveal he's been like that for two weeks. Darrel acknowledges that although Johnny and Dally are both heroes, they are both gone. A stunned and enraged Ponyboy pins Darrel to the ground, but Soda tearfully stops them, fed up with the constant fighting, reminding them that they only have each other and have to look out for each other. Cherry then stops by, revealing she started volunteering at the hospital. She found a pile of Johnny's clothes and thought Ponyboy should have them. She tells Ponyboy that Johnny left a note for him in one of his pockets. The note — which Soda reads to Ponyboy, as Ponyboy is too emotional to even open it — reveals that Johnny had time to think before he died, and that he understands the meaning of "Nothing Gold Can Stay" — which neither of them understood when Ponyboy first recited it at the church. He again tells Ponyboy to "stay gold," and asks him to remind Dally of the good in the world ("Stay Gold").

Ponyboy tells Darrel and Soda that while he loves being a Greaser, that's not all there is to him, which both of his brothers accept. Ponyboy sits down to eat dinner with the two of them. Soda asks him about what he was writing in his notebook, and Ponyboy reveals that it's a story of the events that have happened throughout. Eventually, Darrel and Soda read it out loud, revealing it to be the opening narration to "The Outsiders" novel (Finale ("Tulsa '67")).

== Production history ==
=== San Diego (2023) ===
The musical was originally announced in 2019 and was set to premiere at the Goodman Theatre in Chicago directed by Liesl Tommy with a performance run scheduled from June 20, 2020, until August 2, 2020, that was canceled due to the COVID-19 pandemic. A prior workshop was held in 2022 with Casey Likes as Ponyboy. The musical premiered at the La Jolla Playhouse on February 19, 2023, and closed April 9, 2023, after extending a week due to high ticket sales. The principal cast included Brody Grant as Ponyboy Curtis, Sky Lakota-Lynch as Johnny Cade, Da'Von T. Moody as Dallas Winston, Ryan Vasquez as Darrel Curtis, and Jason Schmidt as Sodapop Curtis.

=== Broadway (2024-present) ===
The production transferred to Broadway with the same creative team. The show began previews on March 16, 2024, at the Bernard B. Jacobs Theatre and opened on April 11, 2024. Among the show's producers are actresses LaChanze and Angelina Jolie, as well as The Araca Group, Francis Ford Coppola under his American Zoetrope banner, and Warner Bros. Theatre Ventures. Other producers include Betsy Dollinger, Cristina Marie Vivenzio, The Shubert Organization, Marylee Fairbanks, Debra Martin Chase and others. The show was directed by Danya Taymor, niece of The Lion King director Julie Taymor. Choreography was by brothers Rick and Jeff Kuperman. Scenography was by AMP featuring Tatiana Kahvegian. Costumes were by Sarafina Bush with music direction and orchestrations by Matt Hinkely. Jack Viertel served as creative director for the project. Tilly Evans-Krueger was the associate choreographer and dance captain for the ensemble. Before moving to Broadway, the cast traveled to Tulsa, Oklahoma to see the real-life places and inspiration behind the original story. Opening night reviews were mixed-to-positive, mostly praising the script, score, choreography and Brody Grant's performance. The original Broadway cast recording was released digitally by Masterworks Broadway/Sony Masterworks on May 22, 2024, followed by physical CD and Vinyl releases on June 28 and August 9 respectively. The album ranked number 1 on the Billboard Cast Albums chart for the week of July 27, 2024. On March 7, 2025, Alex Joseph Grayson took over the principal role of Dallas Winston. On September 21, 2025, Brody Grant played his final performance as Ponyboy, having understudy Trevor Wayne go into the role permanently. On March 15, 2026, Wayne, Lakota-Lynch, Grayson, Schmidt and other original principal cast members Brent Comer, Kevin William Paul, Renni Anthony Magee, and SarahGrace Mariani departed the show.

=== North American Tour (2025-present) ===
On May 29, 2024, it was announced that the show would embark on a North American Tour beginning in fall 2025 at the Tulsa Performing Arts Center following previews at Shea's Performing Arts Center in Buffalo, New York. Performances began September 17, 2025. In May 2026, it was announced that touring production of The Outsiders has recouped its $11 million capitalization costs after just 29 weeks on the road.

== Characters and original casts ==
Character	San Diego	Broadway	North American Tour
Character	2023	2024	2025
Ponyboy Michael Curtis	Brody Grant	Brody Grant	Nolan White
Johnny Cade	Sky Lakota-Lynch	Sky Lakota-Lynch	Bonale Fambrini
Dallas "Dally" Winston	Da'Von T. Moody	Joshua Boone	Tyler Jordan Wesley
Darrel "Darry" Curtis	Ryan Vasquez	Brent Comer	Travis Roy Rogers
Sodapop "Soda" Curtis	Jason Schmidt	Jason Schmidt	Corbin Drew Ross
Sherri "Cherry" Valance	Piper Rae Patterson	Emma Pittman	Emma Hearn
Keith "Two-Bit" Mathews	Trevor McGhie	Daryl Tofa	Jaydon Nget
Robert "Bob" Sheldon	Kevin William Paul	Kevin William Paul	Mark Doyle
Paul Holden	Brent Comer	Dan Berry	Jackson Reagin
Ace	Tilly Evans-Krueger	Tilly Evans-Krueger	Justice Moore
Steve Randle	-	Renni Anthony Magee	Brandon Borkowsky
Marcia	Kiki Lemieux	SarahGrace Mariani	Katie Riedel
Chet	-	RJ Higton	Johnathan Tanner
Beverly	Melody Rose	Melody Rose	Alyssa Villareal
Brill	Barton Cowperthwaite	Barton Cowperthwaite	John Michael Peterson
Trip	Sean Harrison Jones	Sean Harrison Jones	Luke Sabracos
Randy Anderson	Daniel Marconi	(Note: Ensemble character only in La Jolla production)	

== Replacements ==
Broadway:

Ponyboy Curtis - Trevor Wayne, Noah Pacht

Johnny Cade - Caleb Mathura

Dallas “Dally” Winston - Alex Joseph Grayson, SeQuoiia, Daryl Tofa

Darrel “Darry” Curtis - Dan Berry

Sodapop “Soda” Curtis - Sutton James Kaylor

Keith “Two-Bit” Matthews - Derek Jordan Taylor

Robert “Bob” Sheldon - Nicholas McDonough

Paul Holden - Victor Carrillo Tracy, Jackson Reagin

Ace - Runako Campbell

Steve Randle - Alejandro MullerDahlburg

Marica - Logan Gray Saad

Chet - Davis Wayne, Ethan Van Slyke

Beverly - Abby Matsusaka

Brill - Devin Tyler Hatch

Tripp - Cole Zeiser

1st North American Tour:

Ponyboy Curtis - Christian Arredondo

Dallas “Dally” Winston - Anthony Garcia

Sodapop “Soda” Curtis - Jackson Reagin, Brendan Dallaire

Robert “Bob” Sheldon - Andrew Cekala, Gabriel White Marin

Paul Holden - Dante D’Antonio

Ace - Delaney Diaz

Steve Randle - Rodney Thompson

Beverly - Abby Matsusaka, Anna Bermudez, Marina Palarca, Alyssa Villareal

Brill - Kevin Avila

== Musical numbers ==
Act I

- "Tulsa '67" - Ponyboy, Johnny, Company
- "Grease Got a Hold" - Dallas, Sodapop, Two-Bit, Darrel, Greasers
- "Runs in the Family" - Darrel
- "Great Expectations" - Ponyboy, Company
- "Friday at the Drive-In" - Cherry, Bob, Ensemble
- "I Could Talk to You All Night" - Cherry, Ponyboy
- "Runs in the Family (Reprise)" - Darrel
- "Far Away from Tulsa" - Ponyboy, Johnny, Ensemble
- "Run Run Brother" - Dallas, Ponyboy, Johnny, Company

Act II

- "Justice for Tulsa" - Cop, Dallas, Cherry, Paul, Ensemble
- "Death's at My Door" - Ponyboy, Johnny
- "Throwing in the Towel" - Darrel, Sodapop, Ponyboy
- "Soda's Letter" - Sodapop, Ponyboy, Darrel
- "Hoods Turned Heroes" - Two-Bit, Sodapop, Greasers
- "Hopeless War" - Cherry, Ponyboy
- "Trouble" - Dallas, Greasers, Socs
- "Little Brother" - Dallas, Company
- "Stay Gold" - Johnny, Ponyboy
- "Tulsa '67 (Reprise)" - Ponyboy, Company

== Awards and nominations ==
=== 2024 Broadway production ===
Year	Award	Category	Nominee	Result
2024	Tony Awards	Best Musical		Won
2024	Tony Awards	Best Actor in a Musical	Brody Grant	Nominated
2024	Tony Awards	Best Featured Actor in a Musical	Joshua Boone	Nominated
2024	Tony Awards	Best Featured Actor in a Musical	Sky Lakota-Lynch	Nominated
2024	Tony Awards	Best Direction of a Musical	Danya Taymor	Won
2024	Tony Awards	Best Book of a Musical	Justin Levine and Adam Rapp	Nominated
2024	Tony Awards	Best Original Score (Music and/or Lyrics) Written for the Theatre	Jamestown Revival (Zach Chance and Jonathan Clay) and Justin Levine (music and lyrics)	Nominated
2024	Tony Awards	Best Scenic Design in a Musical	AMP featuring Tatiana Kahvegian	Nominated
2024	Tony Awards	Best Lighting Design in a Musical	Hana S. Kim and Brian MacDevitt	Won
2024	Tony Awards	Best Sound Design in a Musical	Cody Spencer	Won
2024	Tony Awards	Best Choreography	Rick Kuperman and Jeff Kuperman	Nominated
2024	Tony Awards	Best Orchestrations	Matt Hinkley, Justin Levine, and Jamestown Revival (Zach Chance and Jonathan Clay)	Nominated
2024	Drama League Awards	Outstanding Production of a Musical		Nominated
2024	Drama League Awards	Distinguished Performance	Joshua Boone	Nominated
2024	Drama League Awards	Distinguished Performance	Brody Grant	Nominated
2024	Outer Critics Circle Awards	Outstanding New Broadway Musical		Nominated
2024	Outer Critics Circle Awards	Outstanding Choreography	Rick Kuperman and Jeff Kuperman	Nominated
2024	Outer Critics Circle Awards	Outstanding Lighting Design	Brian MacDevitt	Won
2024	Drama Desk Awards	Outstanding Musical		Nominated
2024	Drama Desk Awards	Outstanding Lead Performance in a Musical	Brody Grant	Nominated
2024	Drama Desk Awards	Outstanding Direction of a Musical	Danya Taymor	Nominated
2024	Drama Desk Awards	Outstanding Choreography	Rick Kuperman and Jeff Kuperman	Nominated
2024	Drama Desk Awards	Outstanding Music	Jonathan Clay, Zach Chance, and Justin Levine	Nominated
2024	Drama Desk Awards	Outstanding Lyrics	Jonathan Clay, Zach Chance, and Justin Levine	Nominated
2024	Drama Desk Awards	Outstanding Set Design	AMP and Tatiana Kahvegian	Nominated
2024	Drama Desk Awards	Lighting Design	Brian MacDevitt and Hana S. Kim (projections)	Won
2024	Drama Desk Awards	Outstanding Sound Design	Cody Spencer	Won
2024	Theatre World Awards		Brody Grant	Won
2024	Chita Rivera Awards	Outstanding Choreography in a Broadway Show	Rick and Jeff Kuperman	Nominated
2024	Chita Rivera Awards	Outstanding Ensemble in a Broadway Show		Nominated
2024	Chita Rivera Awards	Outstanding Dancer in a Broadway Show	Tilly Evans-Krueger	Won
2024	Dorian Awards	Outstanding Broadway Musical		Nominated
2025	Grammy Awards	Best Musical Theater Album	Jonathan Clay, Zach Chance, and Justin Levine	Nominated
