= Jamestown Revival =

American musical duo

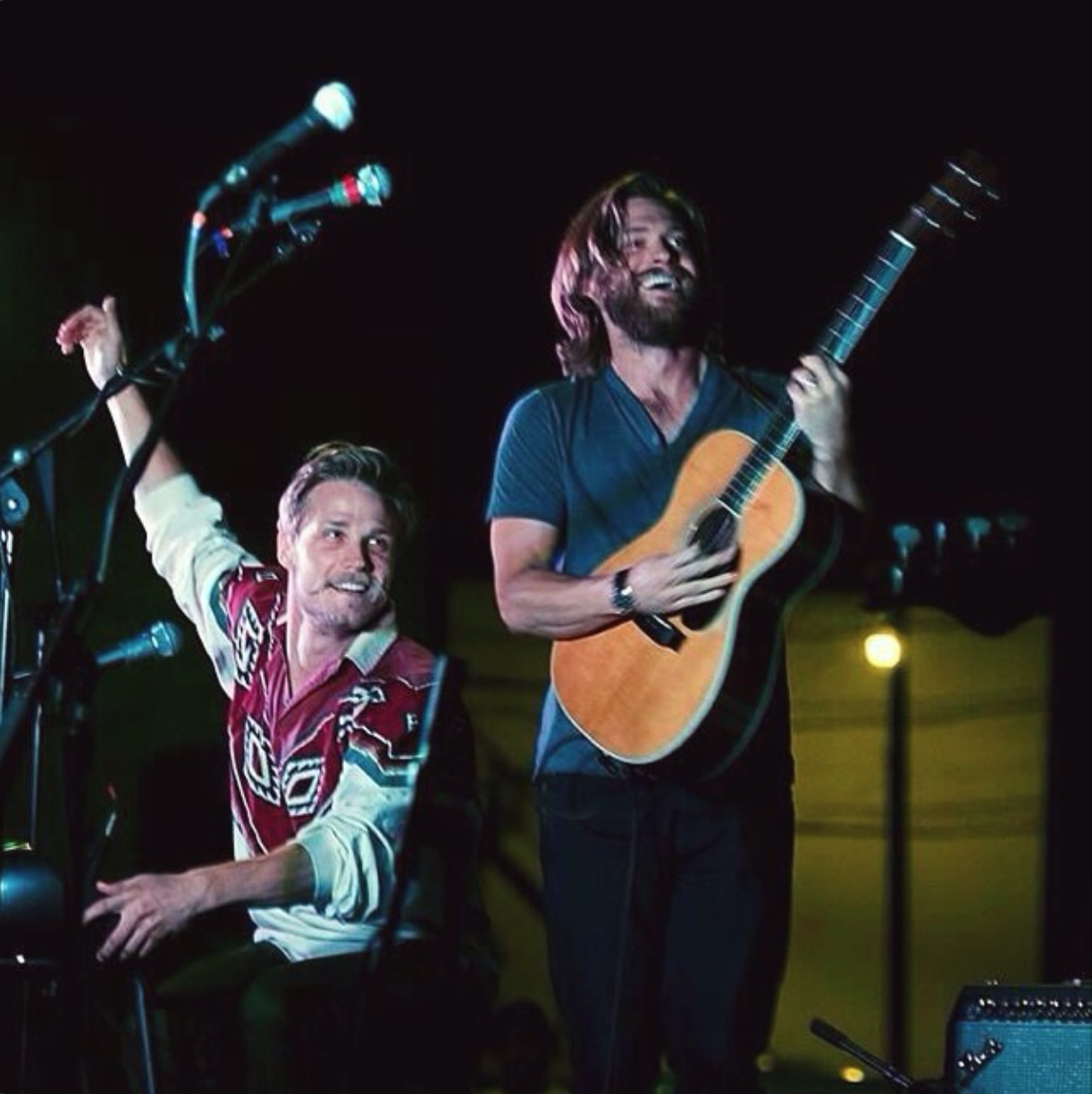

Background information
- Origin: Magnolia, Texas, United States
- Genres: Folk; folk rock; Americana; rock
- Years active: 2010–present
- Labels: Eat Raw; Republic; Universal; Thirty Tigers
- Members: Zach Chance; Jonathan Clay; Nick Bearden; Ed Benrock; Dan Reckard; Preston Wimberly
- Website: http://www.jamestownrevival.com/

Jamestown Revival is an American folk duo made up of Zach Chance and Jonathan Clay. The childhood friends from Magnolia, Texas, write songs about everyday life that are a combination of harmonies that merge Southern country, Americana and Western rock music. Their first album Utah was originally self-released in early 2014 and then re-released by Republic Records later the same year. iTunes named Utah Best of 2014: Singer-Songwriter Album of the Year. Jamestown Revival has been featured in Rolling Stone magazine and covered in the Wall Street Journal. The band has made appearances at music festivals in the U.S., including the South by Southwest (SXSW) music festival in Austin, Texas, Coachella Valley Music and Arts Festival, Bonnaroo Music & Arts Festival, Austin City Limits Music Festival, and a musical appearance on Conan.

== History ==
Zach Chance and Jonathan Clay grew up together in Magnolia, Texas, and collaborated on their first song at the age of 15. Each launched solo singer-songwriter careers and were on tour as individual artists who would sing harmonies on each other's work. It was decided to form a band with harmonies at the forefront as it generated positive audience response. Jamestown Revival was formed in 2010 as a duo and expanded to a five-member band. The name Jamestown Revival was derived from one of the first United States settlements, Jamestown, Virginia, homage to Creedence Clearwater Revival, and the concept of leaving behind the old and starting anew. The band wrote music they wanted to hear rather than what appealed to the masses using the music they listened to as a gauge of quality of their work. The band's music inspirations come from storytellers of adventure such as Louis L'Amour, Willie Nelson and John Prine as well as nature, and simplicity. Jamestown Revival's first album, Utah, was named for the band's recording location in the Wasatch mountains, Utah, where while living in a cabin they used minimal recording studio equipment to create a unique style. The band's temporary move from Texas to California inspired their song "California (Cast Iron Soul)". Jonathan and Zach currently reside outside of Austin, TX.

Chance and Clay, in collaboration with Justin Levine, composed the score for the Broadway musical The Outsiders, which opened at the Bernard B. Jacobs Theatre on April 11, 2024. The show received positive reviews, winning the 2024 Tony Award for Best Musical, with Chance and Clay (as Jamestown Revival) nominated for the Tony Award for Best Original Score.

== Members ==
=== Current ===
- Zach Chance – piano, vocals
- Jonathan Clay – guitar, vocals
- Ed Benrock – drums
- Nick Bearden – bass
- Dan Reckard - organ, keys, saxophone

=== Previous ===
- Brad Lindsay – guitar

== Discography ==
Jamestown Revival discography
- Studio albums: 4
- EPs: 4
- Live albums: 1
- Singles: 14
- Music videos: 6

=== Albums ===
==== Studio albums ====
List of albums, with selected chart positions
Title	Album details	Peak chart position
Title	Album details	Americana/Folk
Utah	Released: February 11, 2014; Label: Self-released Re-released by Republic; Format: Digital download, streaming	13
The Education of a Wandering Man	Released: October 7, 2016; Label: Universal; Format: Digital download, streaming	11
San Isabel	Released: June 14, 2019; Label: Thirty Tigers; Format: CD, vinyl, digital download, streaming	—
Young Man	Released: January 14, 2022; Label: Thirty Tigers; Format: Digital download, streaming, vinyl	—

==== Live albums ====
Title	Album details
Live from Largo at the Coronet Theater	Released: June 26, 2018; Label: Self-released; Format: Digital download, streaming

=== Extended plays ===
Title	Album details
The Knives & Pipes EP	Released: February 3, 2011; Label: Eat Raw; Format: Digital download
The California EP	Released: October 15, 2013; Label: Self-released; Format: Digital download
A Field Guide to Loneliness	Released: October 16, 2020; Label: Self-released; Format: Digital download, streaming
Fireside with Louis L'Amour: A Collection of Songs Inspired by Tales from the American West	Released: May 28, 2021; Label: Self-released; Format: Vinyl, digital download, streaming

=== Singles ===
Title	Year	Album	Ref.
"Fur Coat Blues"	2012	Utah	
"Love is a Burden"	2016	The Education of a Wandering Man	
"Goodnight Hollywood"	2018	Non-album single	
"This Too Shall Pass"	2019	San Isabel	
"Operator"	2019	San Isabel B Sides	(Note: San Isabel B Sides is the name of a two-song single.)
"Dead Wrong"	2019	San Isabel B Sides	
"Helplessly Hoping"	2020	Non-album single	
"Bluebird"	2020	Field Guide to Loneliness	
"Loneliness"	2020	Field Guide to Loneliness	
"Temporary Revelation"	2020	Field Guide to Loneliness	
"Prospector Blues"	2021	Fireside with Louis L'Amour: A Collection of Songs Inspired by Tales from the American West	
"Young Man"	2021	Young Man	
"These Days"	2021	Young Man	
"Working on Love"	2021	Young Man	

=== Music videos ===
Title	Year	Album
"Medicine"	2013	Utah
"California (Cast Iron Soul)"	2014	Utah
"Love is a Burden"	2016	The Education of a Wandering Man
"Goodbye Hollywood"	2018	—
"Prospector Blues"	2021	Fireside with Louis L'Amour: A Collection of Songs Inspired by Tales from the American West
"Bound for El Paso"	2021	Fireside with Louis L'Amour: A Collection of Songs Inspired by Tales from the American West
