= Hell's Kitchen (musical) =

Broadway jukebox musical

- Broadway promotional poster
- Music: Alicia Keys and others
- Lyrics: Alicia Keys and others
- Book: Kristoffer Diaz
- Premiere: November 9, 2023: The Public Theater, New York City
- Productions: 2023 Off-Broadway; 2024 Broadway; 2025 North American Tour

Hell's Kitchen is a jukebox musical built on the music and lyrics of Alicia Keys, with a semi-autobiographical plot about her upbringing in Manhattan in the 1990s. The musical, with a book by Kristoffer Diaz, initially ran at The Public Theater in October 2023, having its Broadway debut at the Shubert Theatre on April 20, 2024, followed by a cast recording on June 7, 2024.

The original Off-Broadway and Broadway productions received positive reviews by theatre critics, considering the musical among the best examples of the jukebox musical, while Maleah Joi Moon, Shoshana Bean, and Kecia Lewis were praised for their acting and vocal performances. The productions received nominations and won at the Lucille Lortel Awards, Drama Desk Awards, Drama League Awards, and Grammy Awards. At the 77th Tony Awards, the Broadway production garnered 13 nominations, winning Best Leading Actress and Best Featured Actress.

== Development ==
In 2011, Alicia Keys was involved as one of the producers and music composer of the Broadway play Stick Fly by Lydia R. Diamond. Although it was critically acclaimed, the play closed due to financial failures in the box office at the Cort Theatre after 24 preview performances and 92 regular performances. In a 2023 interview for Ebony, Keys explained that she was inspired by its "story about a Black family in Martha's Vineyard" and that at that time "there was less diversity in so many ways, particularly in film and television, and definitely in theater".

== Synopsis ==
=== Act 1 ===
Ali, a 17-year-old girl, welcomes the audience to Manhattan Plaza in the neighborhood of Hell's Kitchen, Manhattan, and introduces the people in her life: the musicians who make up the artist housing in Manhattan Plaza; her friends, Tiny and Jessica; and her mother Jersey. Jersey, a singer and working woman who supports Rudy Giuliani's rhetoric and policies on increased policing, notices Ali talking to Knuck, a bucket drummer who is part of a group that hangs out in the building, and forces them to break off their interaction ("The Gospel"). Ali expresses frustration over her mother's protective efforts and yearns for independence ("The River"). Jersey defends her protectiveness to the other residents, pointing out that Ali is only seventeen years old and is still naïve and impulsive ("Seventeen").

While the drummers practice in the building's courtyard, Tiny and Jessica urge Ali to make a move on Knuck ("You Don't Know My Name"). Ali's awkward attempt proves unsuccessful, with Knuck turning her down; shortly after, he and the other drummers are kicked out of the building due to Jersey calling the police. Ali throws a tantrum and storms out of the apartment, but is prevented from leaving the building due to a sudden rainstorm. Hiding in the building's Ellington Room (a music practice room) she notices one of the building's residents Miss Liza Jane practicing piano, and becomes enamored with what she hears; Liza Jane notices her and offers to teach her to play ("Kaleidoscope"). Ali tracks Knuck down at work, where he hesitantly agrees to see her again ("Gramercy Park"). Jersey warns Ali against dating a musician: she recalls falling for Ali's father, Davis, a piano player ("Not Even the King" / "Teenage Love Affair") but laments his continued broken promises and inability to keep plans. Ali continues to pursue Knuck, eventually sleeping with him at his apartment ("Un-Thinkable (I'm Ready)"). She stumbles into the Ellington Room by accident, where Miss Liza Jane makes her sit down for a piano lesson, teaching her some basic music theory.

Ali rides the high of her relationship and her newfound love of music with the encouragement of Jessica, despite Tiny warning her of the danger ("Girl on Fire"). She invites Knuck over while Jersey is at work; Jersey returns home to find them asleep on the couch and angrily ejects Knuck from the apartment. While leaving, Knuck is shocked to learn that Ali is only seventeen. Jersey chases Ali as she follows Knuck down to the lobby, where he gets into a brief scuffle with the doorman Ray. Ali accuses Jersey of ruining her relationship because Jersey could not keep her own; Jersey slaps her in response. They are interrupted by the arrival of the police, whom Jersey called: however, seeing the scuffle they draw their weapons. Luckily, no one gets hurt, but Ali refuses to speak to her mother and retreats to the Ellington Room, where Liza Jane consoles her by pointing out the situation could have been much worse; she reflects on the racism she herself has experienced and urges Ali to continue learning to play so that she may continue a legacy of music ("Perfect Way to Die").

=== Act 2 ===
Ali continues to refuse to speak with Jersey ("Heartburn"). When Jersey fails again to get through to Ali and not wanting to be cut out, she calls up Davis as a last resort ("Love Looks Better"). Ali tracks down Knuck at his paint job ("Work on It"), but is rebuffed: Knuck tells her the police continued to harass him after the arrest, forcing him to escape to Atlanta (Note: In the national tour, Knuck's hometown is changed to the city the production is playing in.) to stay with family for several weeks. Liza Jane privately reveals to Jersey she is terminally ill and likely does not have much longer to live, something she is keeping from Ali. When Ali admits sometimes she wishes Liza Jane was her mother instead, Liza Jane elects to end the lesson, urging Ali to appreciate the time she has with her mother ("Authors of Forever").

Davis arrives at the apartment, where Jersey unloads her guilt over what she put Knuck, Ali, and the other residents through. Davis tries to offer his support, but mainly flirts with Jersey ("Fallin"). A tempted Jersey turns him down, and criticizes him for his absence. Ali falls asleep in the Ellington Room while looking for Liza Jane; when she wakes up she discovers Davis, who tries to bond with her by playing a song together ("If I Ain't Got You"). Ali is cheered up by spending time with her father, but soon realizes his unreliability when he hedges on when they can meet again. Jersey consoles Ali afterwards, and encourages her to talk to Knuck. She then tracks down Davis at his audition and warns him to stay away from Ali, refusing to let him hurt their daughter as he has hurt her ("Pawn It All"). Knuck reveals to Ali he is planning to move in with his family in Atlanta, due to having found community there ("Like You'll Never See Me Again"). The two part on amicable terms; though Ali is saddened that they have no chance of a relationship due to her youth and his moving, she finds solace in realizing she has made an adult decision for the first time. When she returns home, however, she discovers the normally music-laden building silent; she encounters Jersey who tearfully informs her of Miss Liza Jane's passing.

They attend the service held in the Ellington Room, where Ali refuses to engage with the other mourners. Davis arrives and offers a eulogy expressing gratitude for Liza Jane for helping his daughter, and plays a tune on the piano. Ali eventually joins in, leading the mourners in a song ("Hallelujah/Like Water"). Jersey takes a chance and invites Davis to have dinner with her and Ali the following Friday, but he fails to show up. Though disappointed, Ali commends her mother for trying her hardest, and the two resolve that they still have each other ("No One"). Ali tells the audience their relationship continues to be rocky, but they are on steadier ground. She admits sorrow over Knuck's departure and Miss Liza Jane's passing, but continues to pursue music and expresses fondness for her community in Hell's Kitchen ("Empire State of Mind").

== Production history ==
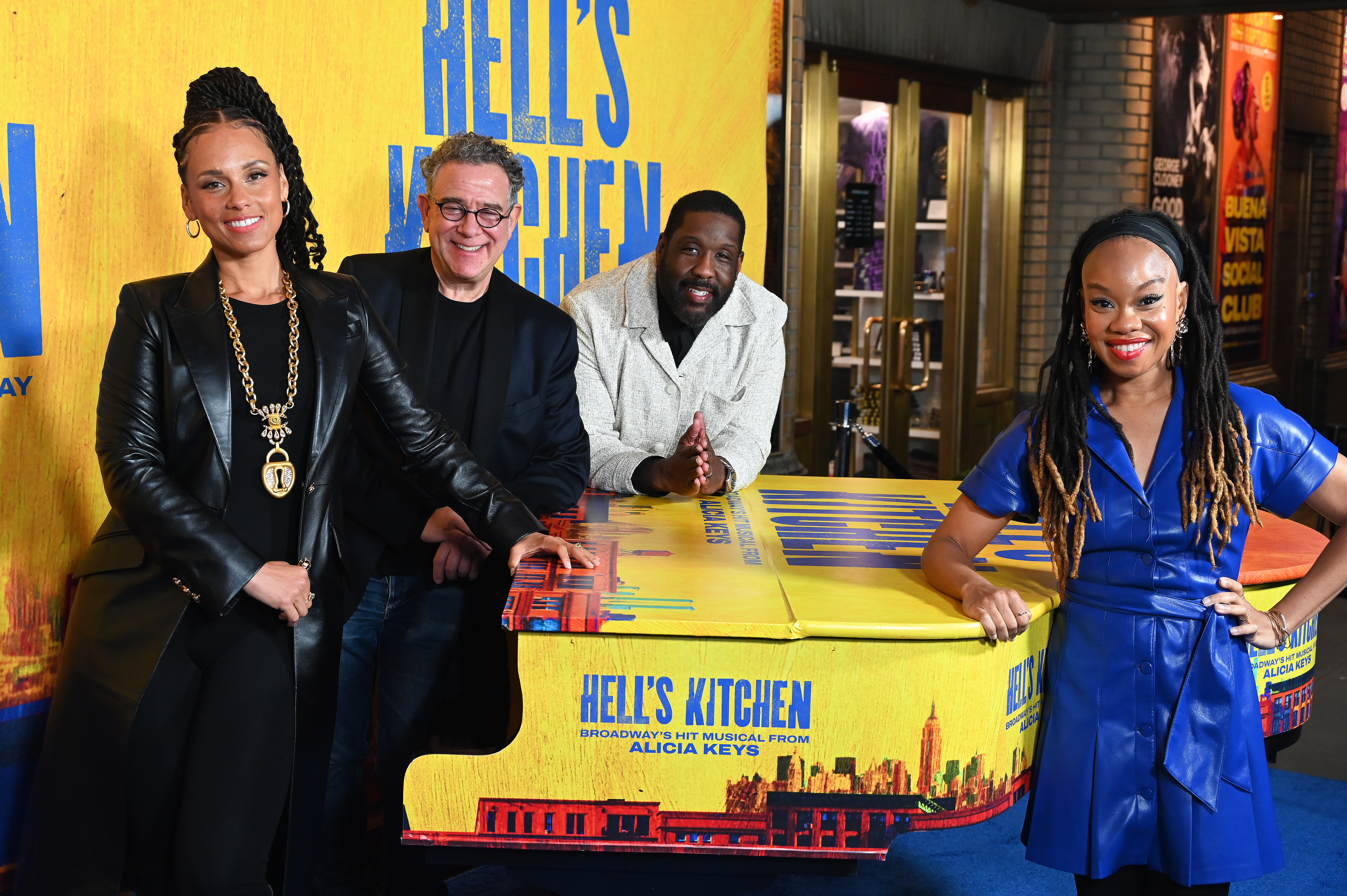
Keys, Greif, Blackstone and Brown at the show's one-year celebration in 2025.

=== Off-Broadway (2023) ===
Keys began developing the play in 2011, and that year Diaz was attached to the project. In 2018, Greif was appointed as the musical's director. By February 2023, the main roles were cast, and casting call for remaining roles was released on February 6 and auditions were held on February 17, 2023, at Actors' Equity New York Audition Center.

In June 2023, Keys announced she had written her first jukebox musical, Hell's Kitchen, inspired by her own life and career in New York City. According to Keys, the musical is a "love story between a mother and a daughter", and in an interview on Good Morning America, she stated that the play describes "the experience of growing up in New York City, really chasing a dream, trying to find who you are, discovering your identity, and really following your heart, ultimately". Tickets went on sale in August 2023. The production was originally set to run from October 24 to December 10, 2023, but on September 12, a two-week extension to December 23 was announced. In October 2023, another two-week extension to January 7 was announced. The play featured some of Keys' best known songs, as well as new music written by Keys specifically for the play. The musical began previews on October 24, 2023, at The Public Theater with an opening night of November 19.

=== Broadway (2024–2026) ===
On December 4, 2023, Keys announced that the production would transfer to the Shubert Theatre on Broadway. The show began previews on March 28, 2024, with an opening night scheduled for April 20, 2024. Casting was announced on February 7, 2024. Further casting was announced on February 26, 2024, with Rema Webb joining the cast as Crystal, Nyseli Vega as Millie, and Takia "Tiki" Hopson joining the ensemble. The rest of the cast was the same as the Public's run, with production and design workers transferring as well. On March 22, 2024, Keys performed the song "Kaleidoscope" with the musical's lead actress Maleah Joi Moon and the cast on The Tonight Show Starring Jimmy Fallon. The production closed on February 22, 2026 after 23 previews and 767 regular performances.

=== North American Tour (2025) ===
A touring production of the musical began at Playhouse Square in Cleveland, Ohio on October 10, 2025. It toured 30 cities in its first year. Tennis player, Serena Williams joined the producing team for the national tour.

=== South Korea production (2026) ===
In April 2026, South Korea's musical and performance production company S&Co announced that the musical would premiered at the GS Art Center in Gangnam District of Seoul on July 24, 2026, with last show on November 8, 2026. Keys was involved into the production, working with the casting direction and translating the dialogues and her songs from English into Korean. The cast featured Korean singers Son Seung-yeon, Park Hye-su, Jung Young-joo, Park Ji-won, K.Will and Tei.

== Musical numbers ==
Act I

- "The Gospel"
- "The River"
- "Seventeen"
- "You Don't Know My Name"
- "Kaleidoscope"
- "Gramercy Park"
- "Not Even the King"
- "Teenage Love Affair"
- "Not Even the King (Reprise)"
- "Un-Thinkable (I'm Ready)"
- "Girl on Fire"
- "Perfect Way to Die"

Act II

- "Heartburn"
- "Love Looks Better"
- "Work on It"
- "Authors of Forever"
- "Fallin"
- "If I Ain't Got You"
- "Pawn It All"
- "Like You'll Never See Me Again"
- "Hallelujah/Like Water"
- "No One"
- "Empire State of Mind"

=== Instrumentation ===
The show's orchestrations are by Adam Blackstone and Tom Kitt, with arrangements by Keys and Blackstone. Kitt served as music consultant, with music coordination by Kristy Norter and music direction by Dominic Fallacaro.

== Cast and characters ==
Character	Off-Broadway	Broadway	North American Tour
Character	2023	2024	2025
Ali	Maleah Joi Moon	Maleah Joi Moon	Maya Drake
Jersey	Shoshana Bean	Shoshana Bean	Kennedy Caughell
Miss Liza Jane	Kecia Lewis	Kecia Lewis	Roz White
Davis	Brandon Victor Dixon	Brandon Victor Dixon	Desmond Sean Ellington
Ray	Chad Carstarphen	Chad Carstarphen	Chikezie Nwankwo
Tiny	Vanessa Ferguson	Vanessa Ferguson	Gigi Lewis
Crystal	Crystal Monee Hall	Rema Webb	Rashada Dawan
Junio/Q	Jakeim Hart	Jakeim Hart	Zaiah Ellis
Millie	Mariand Torres	Nyseli Vega	Beda Spindola
Riq	Lamont Walker II	Lamont Walker II	Jeffrey May Hyche
Knuck	Chris Lee	Chris Lee	JonAvery Worrell
Jessica	Jackie Leon	Jackie Leon	Marley Soleil

=== Notable replacements ===
==== Broadway (2024–2026) ====
- Jersey: Jessica Vosk
- Davis: Durrell "Tank" Babbs, Christopher Jackson, Ne-Yo
- Miss Liza Jane: Yolanda Adams

== Critical response ==
The original Off-Broadway and Broadway productions received mostly positive reviews, being considered among the best examples of a jukebox musical. The performances by Maleah Joi Moon, Kecia Lewis and Shoshana Bean were praised by critics both for acting and singing.

In a 5 out of 5 star review, Lauren Mechling of The Guardian wrote that "If this show doesn't bullet to Broadway, we should all give up", appreciating the set design, choreography and the songs' lyrics and rhythms, which "have been refreshed for the purposes of the story, and not a single tune feels obligatorily wedged in". Sara Holdren of Vulture stressed that Hell's Kitchen "is unquestionably a slick commercial machine" and "able to pull off the feat of making the musically familiar feel brand new", avowing the "and-trite as often as it does because of the sheer force of its performances". Jesse Green from The New York Times commented that "over the course of 11 songs, the first act does the work of ambitious first acts everywhere: expanding the show's horizon to the larger world in which the action takes place" while the songs "fit into the story (and into the mouths of a variety of characters) without too much jimmying. If they don't, the situation is acknowledged effectively" and described the singing, arrangements and orchestrations in the musical as "thrilling".

Aramide Tinubu of Variety described the musical as "a sparkling story paying homage to New York, to that beautiful and heartbreaking transition between girlhood and womanhood", telling both "mother/daughter relationships" and " the issues underlying New York City in the '90s, ... and over-policing in communities of color". Tinubu affirmed that even if "sometimes feel cliché, bordering on corny", the cast "dynamism keeps the show from falling into pure melodrama", becoming "a quintessential musical". Charles McNulty of Los Angeles Times wrote that Hell's Kitchen "made a believer of this jukebox musical denier", pointing out that it "soars whenever the gifted cast is singing one of Keys' brilliantly reinterpreted hits.", which were "artfully reimagined". Nevertheless, McNulty emphasizes that the book "has a stakes problem that's evident throughout" probably because of Kristoffer Diaz "not wanting to intrude into areas that are so personal to Keys".

In a mixed review, Helen Shaw of The New Yorker wrote that the musical sometimes appeared as "a private communication, one not meant to be shared more widely", comparing it to The Gardens of Anuncia by Michael John LaChiusa because of their "certain cipher-like quality" and narration about "women with precocious success look back at their driven childhoods and edit out their grind and ambition in favor of a warm appreciation for their caretakers".

== Awards and nominations ==
=== Original Off-Broadway & Broadway productions ===
Year	Award	Category	Nominee	Result	Ref.
2024	Tony Awards	Best Musical		Nominated	
2024	Tony Awards	Best Actress in a Musical	Maleah Joi Moon	Won	
2024	Tony Awards	Best Featured Actor in a Musical	Brandon Victor Dixon	Nominated	
2024	Tony Awards	Best Featured Actress in a Musical	Shoshana Bean	Nominated	
2024	Tony Awards	Best Featured Actress in a Musical	Kecia Lewis	Won	
2024	Tony Awards	Best Direction of a Musical	Michael Greif	Nominated	
2024	Tony Awards	Best Book of a Musical	Kristoffer Diaz	Nominated	
2024	Tony Awards	Best Scenic Design of a Musical	Robert Brill and Peter Nigrini	Nominated	
2024	Tony Awards	Best Costume Design of a Musical	Dede Ayite	Nominated	
2024	Tony Awards	Best Lighting Design of a Musical	Natasha Katz	Nominated	
2024	Tony Awards	Best Sound Design of a Musical	Gareth Owen	Nominated	
2024	Tony Awards	Best Choreography	Camille A. Brown	Nominated	
2024	Tony Awards	Best Orchestrations	Adam Blackstone and Tom Kitt	Nominated	
2024	Lucille Lortel Awards	Outstanding Musical		Nominated	
2024	Lucille Lortel Awards	Outstanding Choreographer	Camille A. Brown	Nominated	
2024	Lucille Lortel Awards	Outstanding Lead Performer in a Musical	Maleah Joi Moon	Nominated	
2024	Lucille Lortel Awards	Outstanding Featured Performer in a Musical	Shoshana Bean	Nominated	
2024	Lucille Lortel Awards	Outstanding Featured Performer in a Musical	Kecia Lewis	Won	
2024	Drama League Awards	Outstanding Production of a Musical		Won	
2024	Drama League Awards	Distinguished Performance	Shoshana Bean	Nominated	
2024	Drama League Awards	Distinguished Performance	Kecia Lewis	Nominated	
2024	Outer Critics Circle Awards	Outstanding Featured Performer in a Broadway Musical	Kecia Lewis	Won	
2024	Drama Desk Award	Outstanding Projection and Video Design	Peter Nigrini	Won	
2024	Drama Desk Award	Outstanding Choreography	Camille A. Brown	Nominated	
2024	Drama Desk Award	Outstanding Lead Performance in a Musical	Maleah Joi Moon	Won	
2024	Drama Desk Award	Outstanding Featured Performance in a Musical	Shoshana Bean	Nominated	
2024	Drama Desk Award	Outstanding Featured Performance in a Musical	Kecia Lewis	Won	
2024	Chita Rivera Awards	Outstanding Choreography in a Broadway Show	Camille A. Brown	Won	
2024	Chita Rivera Awards	Outstanding Ensemble in a Broadway Show		Nominated	
2024	Chita Rivera Awards	Outstanding Dancer in a Broadway Show	Chloe Davis	Nominated	
2024	Theatre World Award		Maleah Joi Moon	Won	
2024	Dorian Awards	Outstanding Broadway Musical		Nominated	
