= The Independent (2022 film) =

Film by Amy Rice

- Release poster
- Directed by: Amy Rice
- Written by: Evan Parter
- Produced by: Sam Bisbee; Theodora Dunlap; Caddy Vanasirikul; Ryan Cunningham; Evan Parter
- Starring: Jodie Turner-Smith; Brian Cox; Luke Kirby; Stephen Lang; Ann Dowd; John Cena
- Cinematography: David Johnson
- Edited by: Gershon Hinkson
- Music by: Jessica Rose Weiss
- Production companies: Park Pictures; Anonymous Content; Next Productions; Orogen Entertainment; The Exchange
- Distributed by: Relativity Media
- Release date: November 2, 2022 (Peacock)
- Running time: 108 minutes
- Country: United States
- Language: English

The Independent is a 2022 American political thriller film directed by Amy Rice and written by Evan Parter. It stars Jodie Turner-Smith, Brian Cox, Luke Kirby, Stephen Lang, Ann Dowd, and John Cena. The plot centers around a reporter who uncovers a conspiracy that could impact the results of an upcoming presidential election. The film was released on streaming by Peacock on November 2, 2022.

== Plot ==
Elisha "Eli" James, a reporter at the Washington Chronicle, breaks the story that Yale University alum, Olympic gold medalist, and best-selling author Nate Sterling is running as an independent in the upcoming presidential election. His opponents are the unpopular Democratic incumbent and Senator Patricia Turnbull, a Republican who, if elected, would be the first female president of the United States. Eli befriends her idol, Nick Booker. She tells him that she has uncovered a conspiracy: Turnbull is embezzling funds from the lottery (specifically $1 for every $1000) and smuggling them into her Super PAC (political action committee) at the expense of the country's public schools. Near the end of the election, Eli and Booker discover that the perpetrator of the fraud is not Turnbull but Sterling. They talk to Sterling and get him to confess his involvement. Meanwhile, Eli's father dies of cancer. Another journalist tries to take credit for Eli's report. Instead of publishing it, the Washington Chronicle fires the journalist. Eli and Booker decide to start a new news publication, The Independent, to inform the American people of the truth. They publish the report on Sterling and leave the Washington Chronicle.

== Cast ==
- Jodie Turner-Smith as Elisha "Eli" James, an up-and-coming reporter and idealist
- Brian Cox as Nick Booker, a grizzled political journalist and Eli's mentor
- Ann Dowd as Patricia Turnbull, a Republican political candidate who, if elected, would become the first female president of the United States
- John Cena as Nate Sterling, an independent and bestseller author running for office
- Luke Kirby as Lucas Nicoll
- Stephen Lang as Gordon White, the Chronicle's chief editor
- Margaret Odette as Jennifer Cooke
- Michael Gandolfini as Justin
- Alysia Reiner as Kathy Gibbs
- Imani Love as Lieutenant Penelope "Penny" James
- Kecia Lewis as Lynn James
- Willie C. Carpenter as Hal James

== Production ==
The Independent is a co-production between Anonymous Content, Park Pictures, and The Exchange. In 2013, Evan Parter's screenplay for the film ended up on The Black List, an annual survey of the most popular screenplays that had not yet been produced. According to the survey, which polled over 250 film executives, his screenplay received twenty votes for "best" screenplay, tying with Frank John Hughes's Pox Americana and Lisa Joy Nolan's Reminiscence. In February 2020, Amy Rice came on board to direct and Kumail Nanjiani joined the cast. Rice said the story "merges two worlds that I am very passionate about, which are journalism and politics." She cited Aaron Sorkin's The Newsroom, Chris Hegedus and D. A. Pennebaker's The War Room, and the series House of Cards as major influences. In September 2021, Jodie Turner-Smith, Brian Cox, John Cena, and Kathy Bates were added to the cast, with Nanjiani dropping out. In December, Ann Dowd was cast, replacing Bates who departed due to scheduling conflicts. Principal photography, originally scheduled to begin in November 2021, was confirmed to have begun the following month in New York City around 24th Street and 6th Avenue.

== Release ==
The film was released on streaming on Peacock on November 2, 2022.

== Reception ==
On the review aggregator website Rotten Tomatoes, 35% of 17 critics' reviews are positive, with an average rating of 4.7/10. Metacritic, which uses a weighted average, assigned the film a score of 48 out of 100, based on 6 critics, indicating "mixed or average" reviews.

While praised for its well-written script and timely themes, some critics feel the film lacks the gritty, hard-hitting quality often associated with political thrillers. Some argue that the conflict of interest is portrayed too simplistically, and that the film misses an opportunity to delve deeper into issues of minority representation and media responsibility.
