= Ponyboy Curtis =

Fictional protagonist of The Outsiders

- The Outsiders character
- C. Thomas Howell as Ponyboy in the 1983 film adaptation of the novel.
- First appearance: The Outsiders; 1967
- Created by: S. E. Hinton
- Portrayed by: C. Thomas Howell (1983 film); Jay R. Ferguson (1990 TV series); Brody Grant (Original Broadway Cast)

In-universe information
- Full name: Ponyboy Michael Curtis
- Nickname: Pony
- Gender: Male
- Occupation: High school student
- Affiliation: Greasers
- Family: Darrel Curtis Jr. (brother); Sodapop Curtis (brother); Unnamed mother (deceased); Unnamed father (deceased)
- Nationality: American
- Residence: Tulsa, Oklahoma, U.S.
- Age: 14 years
- Date of birth: July 22, 1953

Ponyboy Michael Curtis is a fictional character and the protagonist of S. E. Hinton's 1967 novel The Outsiders. On screen, he is played by C. Thomas Howell in Francis Ford Coppola's 1983 film adaptation and by Jay R. Ferguson in the 1990 sequel TV series. Brody Grant originated the role on stage in the 2023 stage musical adaptation.

== Character overview ==
Ponyboy is a fourteen-year-old boy who belongs to a gang of greasers alongside his elder brothers Darrel Shaynne "Darry" Curtis Jr., and Sodapop Patrick "Soda" Curtis. Although Ponyboy is loyal to and loves his gang, he does not like its criminal nature. He believes that Darry "can't stand him" and seems "too bossy." Since the brothers' parents died, Darry has had full responsibility for Ponyboy and Sodapop, but they can only stay with Darry as long as they do not get in trouble with the police. He lives in Tulsa, Oklahoma, and participates in causing the death of Robert "Bob" Sheldon.

Ponyboy's best friend is Johnny Cade, a boy who is said to resemble "a little dark puppy that has been kicked too many times and is lost in a crowd of strangers."

Ponyboy runs away with Johnny after an argument with Darry and is involved in the death of Bob Sheldon, a "Soc" (pronounced /soʊʃ/ SOHSH—short for Social) after they pulled up on him in his territory, which is later ruled to have been self-defense on the part of Johnny.

He is eventually reunited with his brothers and participates in the rumble alongside other members of the gang. Though a good fighter, he fights poorly in the rumble due to a blow to the head and is severely injured. Dally takes Ponyboy to the hospital to visit Johnny and see how he is doing. Dally gets stopped by a police officer for speeding. He tells Ponyboy to "act sick," and convinces the officer that Ponyboy fell off his motorcycle. The officer ends up escorting them to the hospital. Ponyboy is present for the deaths of both Johnny and, later, Dallas Winston. Having witnessed two deaths in a short period of time, Ponyboy is overwhelmed and passes out.

After the murder of a Soc, running away from home, and the deaths of his two buddies, Ponyboy has to appear in family court to convince the judge that living with his brothers is an appropriate environment. In court, the judge does not ask him questions about the Soc's murder, but instead asks him about his home life and school. Once the judge announces that he can remain under his brother's custody, he returns home and finds a letter from Johnny, which inspires him to start writing the story of his experience being a greaser.

== Other appearances ==
- Ponyboy later makes a minor appearance in Hinton's 1971 novel That Was Then, This Is Now. His scene, however, does not appear in the novel's 1985 film adaptation.
- C. Thomas Howell plays Ponyboy in Francis Ford Coppola's 1983 film adaptation of the novel, in his second feature film role following his appearance in E.T. the Extra-Terrestrial (1982). His performance would ultimately launch him to stardom and make him, alongside his castmates, one of the early pioneers of the phenomena that would become known as the Brat Pack.
- Jay R. Ferguson played Ponyboy in the 1990 television series, which served as a sequel to the 1983 film. The series picks up where the story left off and explores further development in the relationship between him, his brothers and friends. Leonardo DiCaprio was among those who auditioned for the role before Ferguson was cast.
- Brody Grant originated the role of Ponyboy in the 2023 stage musical adaptation of the novel and film. Grant said his performance was partly influenced by similarities between himself and the character. "I also grew up in places where being artistic was not necessarily the norm or the cool thing. I really get Ponyboy in that way," Grant said in an interview. Casey Likes portrayed the character in the musical's 2022 reading. Grant was cast when the show opened at La Jolla Playhouse before moving to Broadway.

== Reception and legacy ==
The character of Ponyboy Curtis continues to be regarded as one of the most enduring teenage characters in 20th-century American fiction.

For his performance in the 1983 film, C. Thomas Howell received critical praise, as well as the Young Artist Award for Best Leading Young Actor in a Feature Film. Robert Osborne in his 1983 review for The Hollywood Reporter wrote that Howell and Ralph Macchio, who played Johnny, carry the film and do a commendable job with their performances.

Brody Grant's portrayal in the stage musical also received positive reviews, as well as numerous accolades, including a Theatre World Award and nominations for the Tony Award for Best Actor in a Musical and the Drama Desk Award for Outstanding Lead Performance in a Musical. Emlyn Travis of Entertainment Weekly wrote: "From the moment that he appears onstage scribbling away in his notebook, it's clear that Grant sees the character for what he truly is: a wide-eyed kid, burdened by familial and societal expectations, who longs for something more. In turn, he plays Ponyboy with a softness and affability that is hard not to root for".

"Cult theatre director" Chris Goode named his second ensemble Ponyboy Curtis after the character.

== Bibliography ==
- Hinton, S.E. (1967). The Outsiders. New York: SPEAK. ISBN 978-0-14-038572-4.
