= Kecia Lewis =

American actress

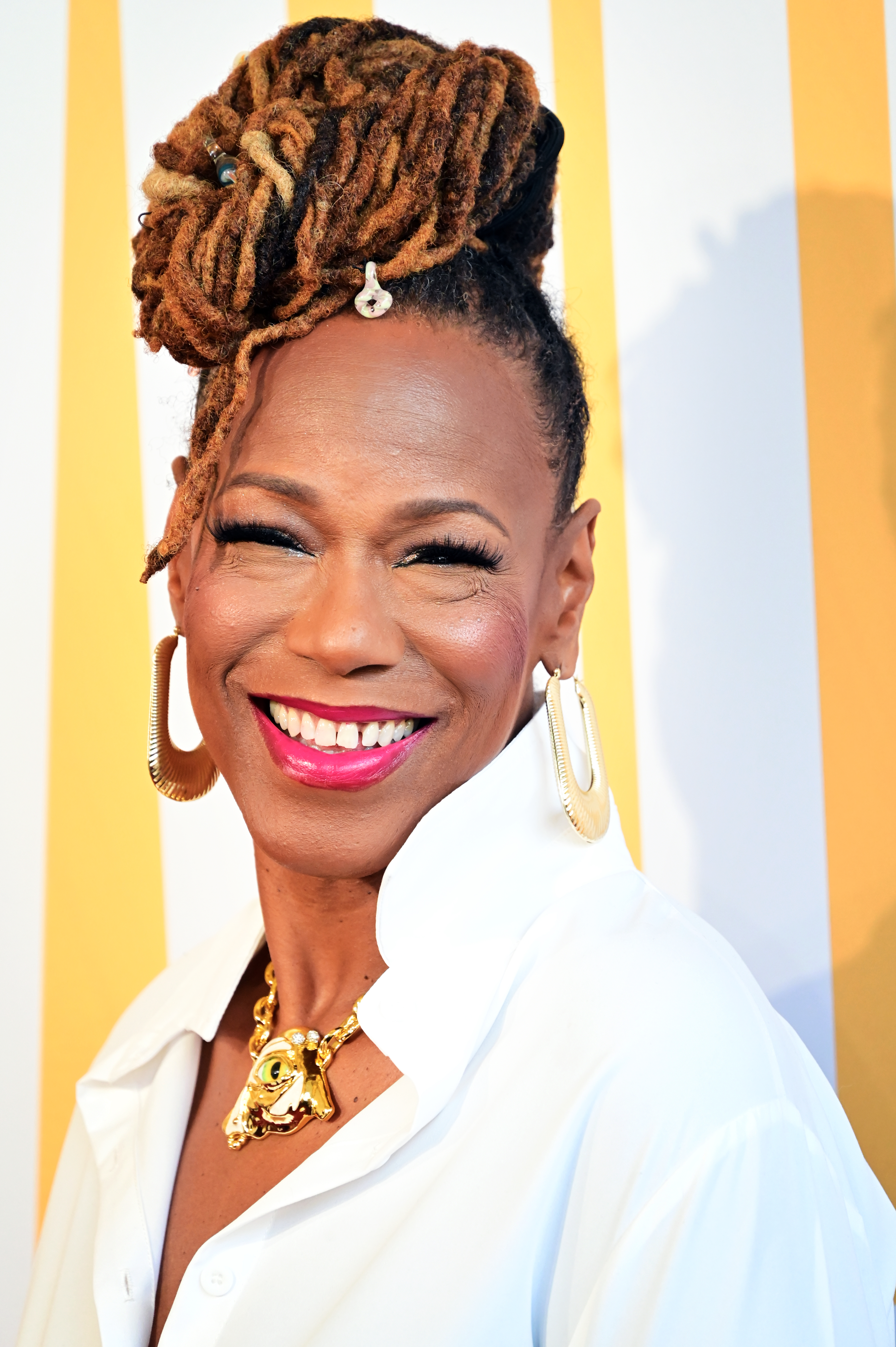
- Lewis in 2026
- Born: Bronx, NY
- Education: High School of Performing Arts
- Occupations: Actress, singer
- Years active: 1980–present

Kecia Lewis, also credited as Kecia Lewis-Evans is an American singer and actress. Lewis made her Broadway debut as a replacement in the musical Dreamgirls (1984), followed by roles in Once on This Island (1990), Leap of Faith (2012), and Hell's Kitchen (2024), the latter of which earned her the Tony Award for Best Featured Actress in a Musical.

== Life and career ==
=== Early years and education ===
Lewis was born and raised in New York City and is a graduate of the High School of Performing Arts.

=== Career ===
Lewis made her Broadway debut at the age of 18 when she joined the original production of Dreamgirls as a replacement for the role of Edna Burke and understudy for the role of Effie White. She served as an standby for Nell Carter and Armelia McQueen in the revival of Ain't Misbehavin'. In 1990, she originated the role of Asaka in Once on This Island.In 2006, she originated the role of Trix the Aviatrix in The Drowsy Chaperone. In 2005, she was nominated for a Drama Desk Award for Outstanding Featured Actress in a Musical her performance as Dorcas in Dessa Rose.

In 2017, her performance as Sister Rosetta Tharpe in Marie and Rosetta earned her an Obie Award and a nomination for the Lucille Lortel Award for Outstanding Lead Actress in a Play. In 2018, she starred as Mrs. Norman in a revival of Children of a Lesser God at the Studio 54. In 2019, Lewis played the recurring role of Tonya on the 2019 follow-up of NBC television series Mad About You. In 2022, she was cast in the Peacock thriller film The Independent.

In 2023, she appeared off-Broadway in the show Hell's Kitchen, originating the role of music educator Miss Liza Jane, and reprised the role on Broadway in 2024, receiving a Tony Award, Drama Desk Award, and Lucille Lortel Award along with a Drama League Award nomination. Lewis also teaches stage and drama acting at the Atlantic Acting School. During her career Lewis also starred in films and television series, including recurring roles in Mad About You, The Passage, The Blacklist, and Law & Order.

In 2026, she is set to appear as a performer in the Off-Broadway revival of Whoopi Goldberg's The Whoopi Monologues at Lincoln Center Theatre. Directed by Whitney White she will star alongside Kerry Washington, Kara Young, Dominique Fishback and Danielle Pinnock.

== Acting credits ==
=== Film ===
Years	Title	Role	Notes
2014	Shelter	Shelter Worker	
2020	Shirley	Nurse	
2022	The Independent	Tonya	

=== Television ===
Years	Title	Role	Notes	Ref.
1992	Law & Order	Langstrom	Episode: "The Fertile Fields"	
2000	The Hughleys	Donna	Episode: "Love or Money"	
2002	Crossing Jordan	Intake Nurse	Episode: "Secrets & Lies: Part 1"	
2013–2020	Law & Order: Special Victims Unit	Judge Constance Copeland	4 episodes	
2013	Royal Pains	Nurse	Episode: "Game of Phones"	
2015	Limitless	Chrystal	Episode: "This Is Your Brian on Drugs"	
2016	Blue Bloods	Sandi Harper	Episode: "Town Without Pity"	
2016	Unbreakable Kimmy Schmidt	Stephanie	Episode: "Kimmy Gives Up!"	
2016	Conviction	Judge Melissa Hinds	Episode: "A Simple Man"	
2017	Madam Secretary	Ms. Morales	Episode: "Revelation"	
2019	SMILF	Aunt Renee	Episode: "Smile More if Lying Fails"	
2019	Wu-Tang: An American Saga	Aunt Goldie	3 episodes	
2019	Mad About You	Tonya	12 episodes	
2019	The Passage	Lacey Antoine	7 episodes	
2020–2021	The Blacklist	Esi Jackson	10 episodes	
2021	With Love	Mia	Episode: "Independence Day"	
2021	And Just Like That...	Laura	Episode: "Tragically Hip"	
2022	The Good Fight	Angela Allen-Hellman	Episode: "The End of STR Laurie"	
2025	Sub/liminal	Detective Paulson	2 episodes	

=== Theatre ===
Years	Title	Role	Venue	Ref.
1985–1987	Big River	Ensemble / Alice (replacement)	Eugene O'Neill Theatre, Broadway	
1988–1989	Ain't Misbehavin'	Standby	Ambassador Theatre, Broadway	
1990–1991	Once on This Island	Asaka	Playwrights Horizons, Off-Broadway	
1990–1991	Once on This Island	Asaka	Booth Theatre, Broadway	
2005	Dessa Rose	Janet / Gemina / Field Hand / Dorcas	Mitzi E. Newhouse Theater, Off-Broadway	
2006–2007	The Drowsy Chaperone	Trix	Marquis Theatre, Broadway	
2008	Shrek the Musical	Dragon	5th Avenue Theatre	
2008–2010	Chicago	Matron "Mama" Morton (replacement)	Shubert Theatre, Broadway	
2010	Hairspray	Motormouth Maybelle	Benedum Center	
2011–2012	Chicago	Matron "Mama" Morton (replacement)	US National Tour	
2012	Leap of Faith	Ida Mae Robinson	St. James Theatre, Broadway	
2014	The Little Mermaid	Ursula	North Shore Music Theatre	
2014–2015	Rodgers + Hammerstein's Cinderella	Marie	US National Tour	
2016	Mother Courage and Her Children	Mother Courage (replacement)	Classic Stage Company, Off-Broadway	
2016	Marie and Rosetta	Sister Rosetta Tharpe	Atlantic Theater Company, Off-Broadway	
2017	Children of a Lesser God	Mrs. Norman	Berkshire Theatre Festival	
2018	Children of a Lesser God	Mrs. Norman	Studio 54, Broadway	
2023–2024	Hell's Kitchen	Miss Liza Jane	The Public Theater, Off-Broadway	
2024–2025	Hell's Kitchen	Miss Liza Jane	Shubert Theatre, Broadway	
2026	The Whoopi Monologues	Lurleen	Mitzi E. Newhouse Theatre, Off-Broadway	

== Awards and nominations ==
Year	Association	Category	Nominee(s)	Result	Ref.
2024	Drama Desk Award	Outstanding Featured Performance in a Musical	Hell's Kitchen	Won	
2024	Drama League Awards	Distinguished Performance	Hell's Kitchen	Nominated	
2024	Lucille Lortel Awards	Outstanding Featured Performer in a Musical	Hell's Kitchen	Won	
2024	Outer Critics Circle Awards	Outstanding Featured Performer in a Broadway Musical	Hell's Kitchen	Won	
2024	Tony Awards	Best Featured Actress in a Musical	Hell's Kitchen	Won	
2024	Grammy Awards	Best Musical Theater Album	Hell's Kitchen	Won	

== See also ==
- African-American Tony nominees and winners
