= Shoshana Bean =

American actress and singer-songwriter (born 1977)

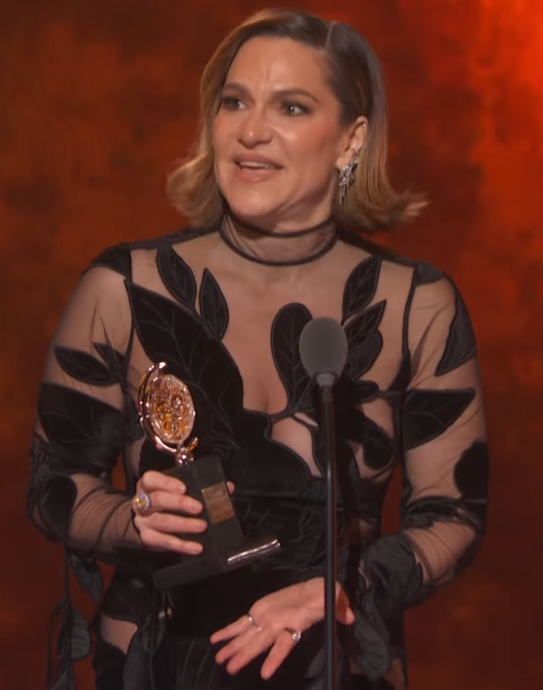
- Bean at 79th Tony Awards in 2026
- Born: September 1, 1977 (age 48); Olympia, Washington, U.S.
- Education: University of Cincinnati (BFA)
- Occupations: Actress, singer, songwriter
- Years active: 2000–present
- Website: shoshanabean.com

Shoshana E. Bean (born September 1, 1977) is an American actress, singer and songwriter. Performing in major Off-Broadway and Broadway productions, she has received a Tony Award and a Grammy Award.

Rising in fame for her debut on Broadway original cast of Hairspray (2002) and as Elphaba in Wicked (2004-2006), in 2017, she won the IRNE Award for Best Actress as Fanny Brice in Funny Girl. In the 2020s, Bean received three nominations at the Tony Award for Best Featured Actress in a Musical for her performances in Mr. Saturday Night (2022), in Hell's Kitchen (2024), and won the award for her performance as Lucy Emerson in The Lost Boys (2026). She also received two nominations for the Grammy Award for Best Musical Theater Album for the musicals' cast recordings, winning for Hell's Kitchen.

Bean has released three albums and has appeared on many theater cast recordings. She won a AIM Independent Music Award for Best R&B Song with her single "Superhero".

== Early life and education ==
Shoshana Bean was born in Olympia, Washington to Jeff Bean and Felice Moskowitz, a dance teacher. She is Jewish; her father is an Ashkenazi Jew and her mother is a Sephardic Jew, whose family was from Greece. When she was 9 years old, her parents divorced and she moved to the Portland, Oregon area.

In 1995, Bean graduated from Beaverton High School. In 1999, Bean received a B.F.A. in Musical Theatre from the University of Cincinnati College-Conservatory of Music (CCM).

== Career ==
=== Theater ===
Shortly after moving to New York City in 2000, Bean was cast in the 2000 Off-Broadway revival of Godspell at the York Theatre at Saint Peter's Church in Midtown Manhattan. In 2001, Bean performed in the national tour of Leader of the Pack. In 2002, Bean made her Broadway debut as an original cast member in the role of Shelley, Denizen of Baltimore, which she originated, in the Tony Award-winning production of Hairspray. She was also an understudy for the roles of Tracy Turnblad, Velma Von Tussle, and Prudy Pingleton.

In 2004, Bean joined the Broadway production of the musical Wicked as a replacement standby for Elphaba, who was played by Idina Menzel. On January 8, 2005, a day before Menzel's scheduled end of her run as Elphaba, Menzel fell through a trap door and cracked a lower rib. Bean went on to perform that show. On January 11, 2005, Bean took over as Elphaba full-time, where she performed opposite Jennifer Laura Thompson and then Megan Hilty as Glinda, until her last show on January 8, 2006. On January 10, she was replaced by Eden Espinosa as Elphaba.

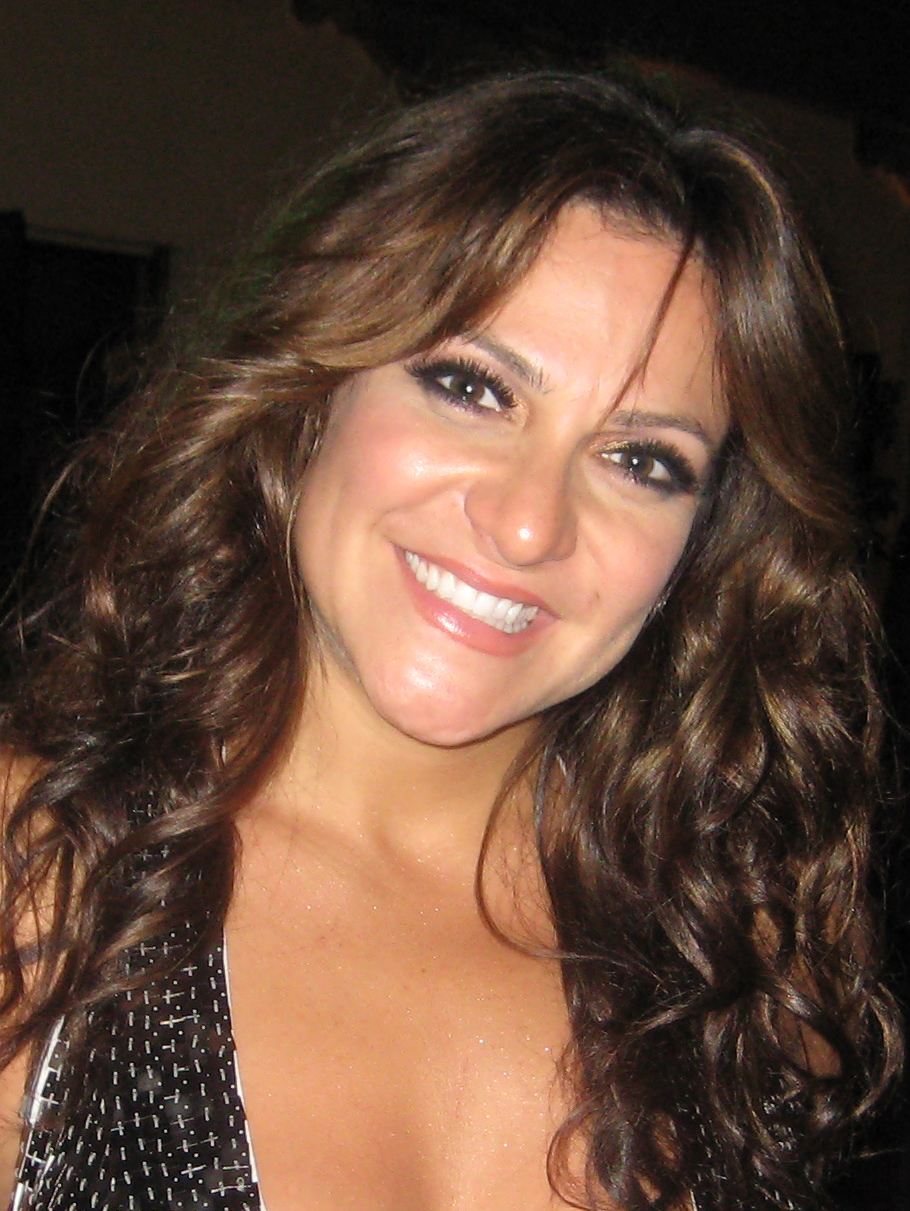
Bean in 2008.

In 2006, Bean reprised the role of Elphaba in the first national tour of Wicked. Her limited engagement ended on December 31. In 2009, Bean joined the new production of Peepshow in Las Vegas in the role of Peep Diva alongside Holly Madison. She replaced Spice Girls singer Mel B. In 2011, Bean wrote and starred in the musical Dear John Mayer, with music and lyrics by Bean and book by fellow CCM graduate Eydie Faye.

In 2015, Bean portrayed the role of CeeCee Bloom in the musical adaptation of the book and movie Beaches at the Drury Lane Theater in Chicago. In June 2016, Bean played Fanny Brice in North Shore Music Theatre's production of Funny Girl. In 2018, Bean performed in the New York City Center Encores! Off-Center production of Songs for a New World. On March 18, 2019, Bean returned to Broadway in the role of Jenna Hunterson in the production of Waitress for a limited engagement through May 2019. On May 13, 2019, it was announced that Bean's run was extended through July 21, 2019.

Starting in March 2022, she returned to Broadway in Mr. Saturday Night at the Nederlander Theatre starring Billy Crystal. For her performance, she received nominations for the Distinguished Performer Award at the Drama League Awards, Outstanding Featured Actress in a Musical at the 71st Outer Critics Circle Awards, and the Tony Award for Best Featured Actress in a Musical at the 75th Tony Awards. At the 65th Annual Grammy Awards Bean was nominated for Best Musical Theater Album as a cast singer.

Between October 2023 to January 2024 Bean starred as Jersey in Alicia Keys' Off-Broadway jukebox musical Hell's Kitchen at The Public Theater. She was confirmed for the Broadway production at the Shubert Theatre, which opened on April 20, 2024. For her performance on and Off-Broadway, she received nominations from the Tony Awards (with her second nomination for Best Featured Actress in a Musical at the 77th Tony Awards), Drama Desk Awards, Drama League Awards, and Lucille Lortel Awards.

In December 2025, it was announced that Bean would star as Lucy Emerson in a musical adaptation of The Lost Boys, replacing Caissie Levy after she left the production due to her commitment to the Broadway revival of Ragtime and wanting to spend more time with her family. The show would begin previews in March 2026 at the Palace Theatre, with opening night on April 26. Bean received another nomination for the Tony Award for Best Featured Actress in a Musical for her performance, for which she garnered her first win.

=== Singer ===
On December 2, 2008, Bean released her debut solo album, Superhero, on her own label Shotime Records. The record has been described as pop rock. In February 2013, Bean's second album, O'Farrell Street, was released. It was produced by Tim K (Madonna, Celine Dion, Brandy), and incorporates 1960s-era soul. The record reached No. 3 on the iTunes R&B charts.

In December 2014, Bean released an EP album of blues called Shadows to Light. The record was produced by Bean and Jake Schaefer. It reached No. 1 on the iTunes Blues charts. She performed her single "Runaway Train" on The Queen Latifah Show. Beginning in 2015, Bean has performed with Scott Bradlee's Postmodern Jukebox (PMJ), performing Justin Bieber's "Sorry" and Backstreet Boys' “I Want It That Way,” among others. In the spring of 2016, she joined the PMJ European Tour.

In February 2018, Bean's third album, Spectrum, was released. The songs are in the genre of rhythm and blues. The record release was accompanied by a tour, which included concerts at the Apollo Theater in Harlem, which featured an 18-piece orchestra, as well as a string of other dates including in London at Cadogan Hall, Las Vegas and Dallas. Bean has said that inspirations for the record were the music of Aretha Franklin, Barbra Streisand, and Frank Sinatra. In August and September 2019, Bean performed selected songs at a series of residency concerts at Feinstein's/54 Below.

Bean's music has been featured on MTV's The Hills, Mercy, Girlfriends' Guide to Divorce, Bad Girls Club and Showtime's The Big C, and she arranged the vocals for Jennifer Lopez's performance of her 2014 song "I Luh Ya Papi" on American Idol. Bean has appeared on film soundtracks to Hairspray, Enchanted, the Wayans Brothers' Dance Flick, and the 2016 animated musical Sing. Bean has performed around the world in cabarets and concerts. She has sung with artists such as BeBe Winans, Brian McKnight, Ariana Grande, David Foster, Jason Robert Brown and Michael Jackson, among others.

== Theater credits ==
Year	Production	Role	Venue	Dates	Notes
2000	Godspell	Ensemble	York Theatre at Saint Peter's Church, New York	N/A	
2001	Leader of the Pack	Performer	U.S. National Tour	Mar 13, 2001 - Jun 03, 2001	
2002	Hairspray	Shelly/ Denizen of Baltimore/ Tracy Turnblad (understudy)/ Velma Von Tussle (understudy)/ Gym Teacher (understudy - replacement)/ Prudy Pingleton (understudy - replacement)/ Matron (understudy - replacement)	Neil Simon Theatre, New York	Jul 18, 2002 - Apr 18, 2004	
2004	Wicked	Elphaba (standby - replacement)	Gershwin Theatre, New York	Sep 7, 2004 - Jan 9, 2005	
2005	Wicked	Elphaba (replacement)	Gershwin Theatre, New York	Jan 11, 2005 - Jan 8, 2006	
2006	Wicked	Elphaba (replacement)	U.S. National Tour	Sep 6, 2006 - Dec 31, 2006	
2009	Peepshow	Peep Diva	Planet Hollywood Resort and Casino, Paradise, Nevada	N/A	
2011	Dear John Mayer	N/A	Open Fist Theatre, Hollywood, California	N/A	also Music and Lyric credits
2015	Beaches	CeeCee Bloom	Drury Lane Theater, Chicago	Jun 24, 2015 - Aug 16 2015	
2017	Funny Girl	Fanny Brice	North Shore Music Theatre, Beverly, Massachusetts	N/A	
2018	Songs for a New World	Woman #2	New York City Center Encores! Off-Center, New York	Jun 27, 2018 - Jun 30 2018	
2019	Waitress	Jenna Hunterson	Brooks Atkinson Theatre, New York	Mar 18, 2019 - Jul 21, 2019	
2022	Mr. Saturday Night	Susan Young	Nederlander Theatre, New York	Mar 29, 2022 - Sep 4, 2022	Nomination: Tony Award, Drama League Award, and Outer Critics Circle Award
2023	Hell's Kitchen	Jersey	The Public Theater, New York	October 24, 2023 - Jan 14, 2024	
2024	Gutenberg! The Musical!	Producer	James Earl Jones Theatre, New York	Jan 24, 2024	One night only
2024	Hell's Kitchen	Jersey	Shubert Theatre, New York	March 28 - December 1, 2024	Nomination: Tony Award, Drama Desk Award, Lucille Lortel Award, and Drama League Award.
2025	Songs for a New World	Woman #2	Hammersmith Apollo	September 21	30th Anniversary Concert
2026	The Lost Boys	Lucy Emerson	Palace Theatre	March 27, 2026 - present	Tony Award for Best Featured Actress in a Musical; Nomination: Drama League Award

=== Benefits ===
Year	Title	Venue	Dates	Notes
2000	First You Dream: A Tribute to Courage	New Amsterdam Theatre, New York	June 12, 2000	Benefit for Actors' Fund of America and the Christopher Reeve Paralysis Foundation in honor of Christopher Reeve and Bran Pace
2001	Dreamgirls 20th Anniversary Benefit Concert	Ford Center for the Performing Arts	Sep 24, 2001	Benefit for Actors' Fund of America
2004	Hair	New Amsterdam Theatre, New York	Sep 20, 2004	Benefit for the Actors' Fund of America
2008	The Yellow Brick Road Not Taken	Gershwin Theatre, New York	Oct 27, 2008	Benefit for New York Restoration Project

== Discography ==
=== LPs ===
- 2008: Superhero (Shotime Records)
- 2013: O' Farrell Street (Shotime Records)
- 2018: Spectrum (Shotime Records)
- 2025: Only Smoke (Shotime Records)

=== EPs ===
- 2014: Shadows to Light - EP (Shotime Records)
- 2020: Selah - EP
- 2022: She Is Risen: Jesus Christ Superstar All-Female Cast - EP

=== Singles ===
- 2011: "A Little Hope" (Billy-Boo)
- 2012: "O Holy Night" (Shotime Records)
- 2012: "Runnin' Out Of Days" (Shotime Records)
- 2013: "Skywriter" (Shotime Records)
- 2014: "Runaway Train" (Shotime Records)
- 2015: "Jealous" (Shotime Records) – cover of the Labrinth song
- 2015: "Have Yourself a Merry Little Christmas" (Shotime Records)
- 2017: "One Way to Go" (Shotime Records) – written by Bean and Britten Newbill.

=== Soundtracks and cast recordings ===
- 2001: Godspell – Off-Broadway Revival Cast Recording (Varese Sarabande)
- 2002: Hairspray – Original Broadway Cast Recording (Sony Classical)
- 2007: Hairspray – Original Motion Picture Soundtrack (New Line Records)
- 2008: Enchanted – Original Motion Picture Soundtrack (Walt Disney Records)
- 2015: Are You Joking?, "Ain't Life Funny" – Original Motion Picture Soundtrack (Barb & Associates Records)
- 2018: Songs for a New World - 2018 New York City Center Encores! Off-Center Cast Recording (Ghostlight Records)
- 2022: Mr. Saturday Night - Original Broadway Cast Recording (Craft Recordings)
- 2024: Hell's Kitchen - Original Broadway Cast Recording
- 2026: The Lost Boys: A New Musical - Original Broadway Cast Recording

=== Selected other recordings ===
- 2003: "Dreidel, Dreidel, Dreidel" on Broadway's Greatest Gifts: Carols for a Cure
- 2005: "I Believe in Love" from Hair for Actor's Fund Benefit Recording
- 2007: "Home" on Dreaming Wide Awake: The Music of Scott Alan
- 2008: "House of Love" on 37 Notebooks by Jeremy Schonfeld
- 2008: "Could" on Matt Cusson by Matt Cusson
- 2009: "Tiny Urban Zoo" on School House Rock:Earth
- 2011: "Sing Me a Happy Song" on My Lifelong Love by Georgia Stitt
- 2012: "Stand Up (The Anthem to Benefit St. Jude)"
- 2013: "Monster" on Alphabet Radio by The Edge Effect
- 2014: "I'm in Pain" on Anything Worth Holding On To by Scott Alan
- 2015: "I Want It That Way" on Selfies on Kodachrome by Postmodern Jukebox
- 2015: "Poison" on Emoji Antique by Postmodern Jukebox
- 2016: "Sorry" on PMJ and Chill by Postmodern Jukebox
- 2016: "Stone Cold" on Swing the Vote by Postmodern Jukebox
- 2017: "I Did Something Bad" by Taylor Swift with Cynthia Erivo
- 2017: "Goodbye to You" on Only Human by Matt Cusson
- 2017: "Flying Monkey Lament" on Straight Outta Oz by Todrick Hall
- 2017: "Who Would Imagine a King" on Christmas Sessions EP by Matt Bloyd
- 2017: "Baby It's Cold Outside" on Warm Up EP by VoicePlay
- 2018: "This is Me" from The Greatest Showman: Original Motion Picture Soundtrack
- 2018: "Crashed N' Burned" on Paint Me Back by Patric Scott
- 2021: "Kailangan Ko'y Ikaw" on Giliw: A Troy Laureta OPM Collective Vol. 2 by Troy Laureta

== Filmography ==
- 2009: The Battery's Down (TV Series) as Dr. Mary Jane Essajay in 1 episode: "I Think I'm Gonna Like it Here"
- 2009: The Girls Next Door (TV Series) as Peep Diva in 1 episode: "Look Before You Peep"
- 2009: Schoolhouse Rock! (TV Series short) vocals in 1 episode: "A Tiny Urban Zoo"
- 2017: Bloodline (TV Series) as Shayna in 1 episode: "Part 30"
- 2020: Bill & Ted Face the Music as First Noble
- 2024: The Boys as Queen Maeve (voice)

== Awards and honors ==
Year	Award	Work	Category	Result	Ref.
2010	AIM Independent Music Awards	"Superhero"	Best R&B Song	Won	
2015	Jeff Award	Beaches	Best Lead Actress in a Musical	Nominated	
2017	IRNE Award	Funny Girl	Best Actress	Won	
2022	Tony Award	Mr. Saturday Night	Best Performance by a Featured Actress in a Musical	Nominated	
2022	Drama League Awards	Mr. Saturday Night	Distinguished Performer Award	Nominated	
2022	Outer Critics Circle Awards	Mr. Saturday Night	Outstanding Featured Actress in a Musical	Nominated	
2023	Grammy Awards	Mr. Saturday Night	Best Musical Theater Album	Nominated	
2024	Lucille Lortel Awards	Hell's Kitchen	Outstanding Featured Performer in a Musical	Nominated	
2024	Drama League Awards	Hell's Kitchen	Distinguished Performance	Nominated	
2024	Drama Desk Award	Hell's Kitchen	Outstanding Featured Performance in a Musical	Nominated	
2024	Tony Awards	Hell's Kitchen	Best Performance by a Featured Actress in a Musical	Nominated	
2024	Broadway.com Audience Awards	Hell's Kitchen	Favorite Featured Actress in a Musical	Nominated	
2024	Broadway.com Audience Awards	Hell's Kitchen	Favorite Diva Performance	Nominated	
2025	Grammy Awards	Hell's Kitchen	Best Musical Theater Album	Won	
2026	Tony Awards	The Lost Boys	Best Performance by a Featured Actress in a Musical	Won	
2026	Drama League Awards	The Lost Boys	Distinguished Performer Award	Nominated	
2026	Broadway.com Audience Awards	The Lost Boys	Favorite Featured Actress in a Musical	Won	
2026	Broadway.com Audience Awards	The Lost Boys	Favorite Diva Performance	Nominated	
2026	Broadway.com Audience Awards	The Lost Boys	Favorite Onstage Pair (shared with Paul Alexander Nolan)	Nominated	
2026	Dorian Award	The Lost Boys	Outstanding Featured Performance in a Broadway Musical	Nominated	
