= Jonathan Clay (musician) =

American singer-songwriter

Jonathan Clay is an American singer-songwriter from Magnolia, Texas.

== Career ==
He released his first EP Whole New Me in 2006 on iTunes. Atlantic Records signed Clay to a development deal in 2007. In June 2007 Clay released his second album Back to Good. MTV music supervisors found his work on MySpace. ABC Family used Clay's "After All" in Lincoln Heights in 2008. Levi's and True Anthem sponsored Clay's give away of 140,000 downloads of Acoustic Sessions in 2008. In 2010 Clay recorded Everything She Wants with producer Kevin Kadish. "Gypsy Woman", a cut from that album, was used in the U.S. television series Sons of Anarchy in 2011. In late 2010 Clay formed a new band called Jamestown Revival. The duo teamed Clay with his childhood friend Zach Chance and within six months of forming the band the duo were featured in Rolling Stone magazine for the Cover of the Rolling Stone contest. "Heart on Fire", a song featuring Clay's vocals, was featured in the 2012 comedy LOL starring Miley Cyrus, Demi Moore, Ashley Greene, Adam Sevani, and Douglas Booth. Clay sang three additional songs for the film.

Jonathan Clay and Zach Chance, along with Justin Levine, wrote the music and lyrics for the musical The Outsiders, which opened on Broadway in 2024. Their work received nominations from the Tony Awards and Drama Desk Awards in 2024.

== Discography ==
=== Albums ===
- 2006 Whole New Me
- 2007 Back to Good
- 2010 Everything She Wants

=== Jamestown Revival ===
- Knives and Pipes (EP, 2011)
- The California EP (EP, 2013)
- Utah. A Collection Of Recorded Moments From The Wasatch Mountains (2014)
- The Education of a Wandering Man (2016)
- Live from Largo at The Coronet Theatre (live album, 2018)
- San Isabel (2019)
- A Field Guide to Loneliness (EP, 2020)
- Fireside with Louis L'Amour. A Collection of Songs Inspired by Tales from the American West (EP, 2021)
- The Outsiders Musical music and lyrics (Broadway, 2024)

=== Other ===
- 2008 Love at War (single!)
- 2008 This Ones for Me (single and video) *winner MTVu Freshman Video
- 2009 Acoustic Sessions (EP)
- 2012 Heart on Fire (Single, from LOL (2012) soundtrack)
