= Adam Blackstone =

American musician

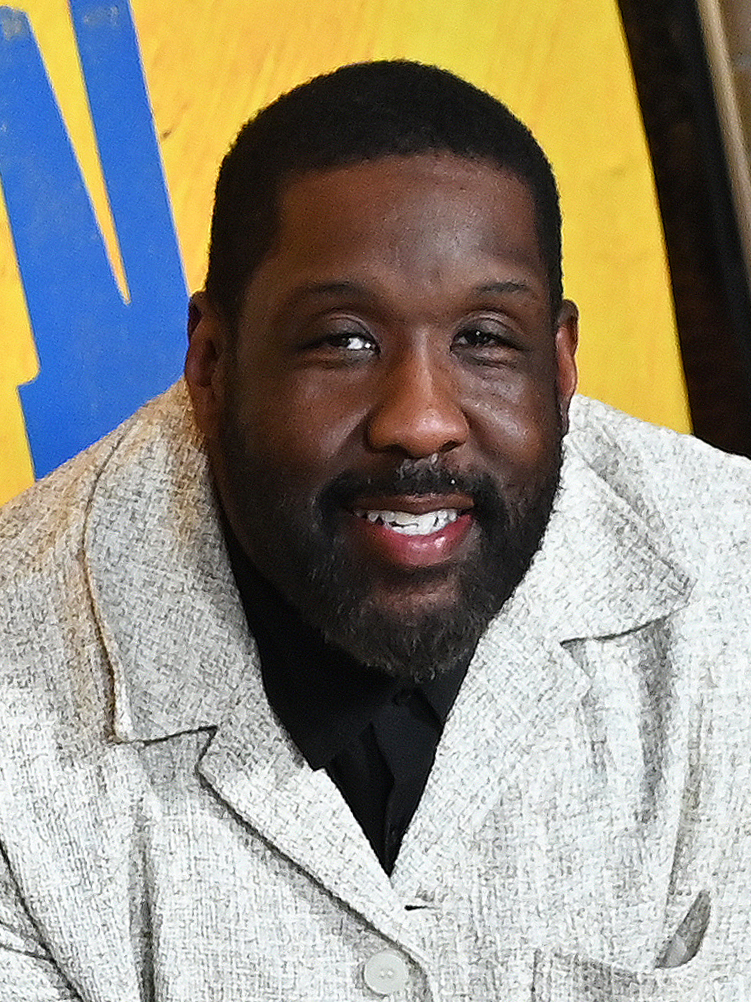
- Blackstone in 2025

Background information
- Born: Adam Blackstone; December 4, 1982 (age 43); Trenton, New Jersey
- Origin: Philadelphia
- Occupations: Producer, songwriter, musical director, musician
- Instruments: Bass, piano, keyboards, drums, vocals, harmonica, banjo, mandolin, guitar
- Years active: 2003–present
- Website: www.adamblackstone.com

Adam Blackstone (born December 4, 1982, in Trenton, New Jersey) is a multi-instrumentalist, songwriter, producer, and bassist. He is the musical director for Nicki Minaj and Justin Timberlake. Blackstone has also directed and played in performances with Jay-Z, Kanye West, Eminem, Janet Jackson, Dr. Dre, The Jonas Brothers, The Roots, Ms.Marilyn Marshall, Al Green, The Isley Brothers, Angie Stone, Mike Posner, Steve Tirpak, Al Jarreau, Maroon 5, Demi Lovato, and Jill Scott.

== Early years ==
Adam Blackstone began playing drums at the age of 4 at El Bethel Baptist church on Euclid Avenue in Trenton, New Jersey. With his father serving as the church organist, and his mother singing in the choir, Blackstone has said he first fell in love with music at church. Though his sights were set on being a drummer, he began playing bass in 3rd grade at his music teacher's suggestion. He started playing upright bass in 9th grade, in order to join his Willingboro High School jazz band. He went on to earn a full scholarship to the University of the Arts in Philadelphia thanks to his musical abilities. It was there that Adam studied contemporary jazz, honing and perfecting his bass playing and arranging skills.

== Career ==
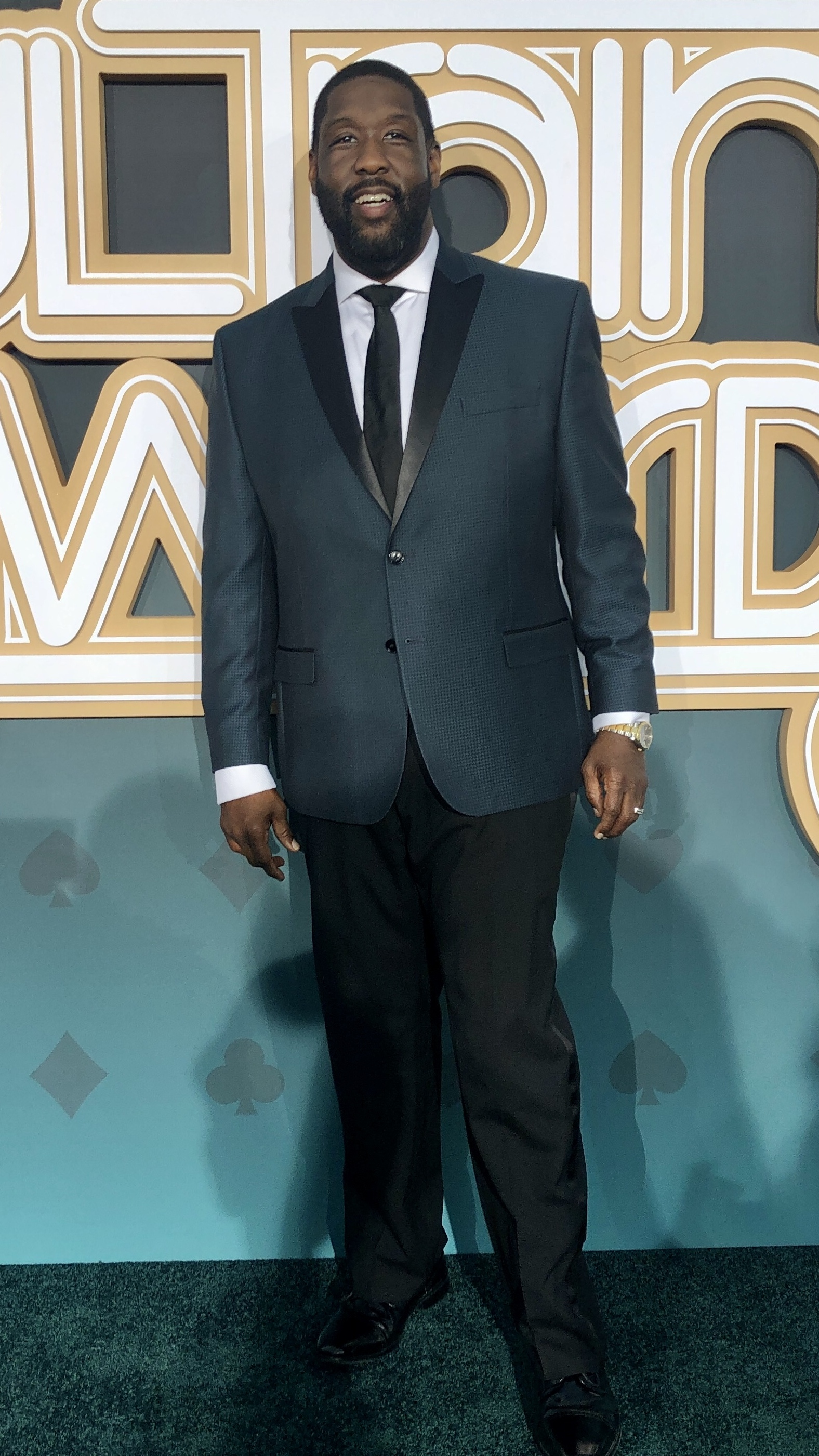
Blackstone at the 2019 Soul Train Music Awards.

Adam Blackstone began his career as a session musician in the Philadelphia area. Known for his round, distinct tone, Adam caught the attention of drummer and producer Questlove of the well known hip hop and soul group, The Roots. His first major live performance was at age 21 with Jay-Z during the Fade to Black concert at Madison Square Garden in November 2003. This show, along with Dave Chappelle's Block Party, were both filmed and made into popular documentaries that significantly elevated Blackstone's notoriety. As his career progressed, Adam became more well known among artists and labels for his tenacity, leadership skills, and work ethic. Adam has since worked with and for several other A-list artists.

In 2012, Adam was the music director and bassist for Rihanna on her 777 Tour, which involved playing in 7 countries in 7 consecutive days.

Following his work with the popular American rock band Maroon 5, Adam Blackstone was also featured as an adviser to coach Adam Levine during NBC's season one of The Voice.

In 2014, Adam Blackstone was recruited by Eminem to be the music director for his comeback show after a 3-year hiatus at the famed Austin City Limits Music Festival. Adam was also the music director for the Super Bowl LVI halftime show in 2022 headlined by Dr. Dre, Snoop Dogg, Eminem, Mary J. Blige, and Kendrick Lamar, and included surprise appearance by 50 Cent and guest appearance by Anderson .Paak. More recently Adam worked with Justin Timberlake as a member and music director of his band formerly known as the Tennessee Kids.

Alongside working with several A-list artists, Adam also runs his own production company with his wife Kaisha, entitled BBE (BASSic Black Entertainment), which features several up and coming pop and R&B acts. Founded in 2008, it thrives mostly as a live music staffing service for these artists. Kaisha Blackstone is the current CFO, while Adam runs the more creative side of the organization.
