= 2022 Fresno State Bulldogs football team =

American college football season

2022 Fresno State Bulldogs football

Mountain West champion MW West Division champion LA Bowl champion

MW Championship Game, W 28–16 vs. Boise State

LA Bowl, W 29–6 vs. Washington State
- Conference: Mountain West Conference
- West Division

Ranking
- Coaches: No. 24
- AP: No. 24
- Record: 10–4 (7–1 MW)
- Head coach: Jeff Tedford (4th season)
- Offensive coordinator: Kirby Moore (1st season)
- Offensive scheme: Pistol
- Defensive coordinator: Kevin Coyle (5th season)
- Base defense: 4–3
- Home stadium: Bulldog Stadium

2022 Mountain West Conference football standings
	Conf.			Overall
Team	W		L	W		L
Mountain Division
Boise State xy	8	–	0	10	–	4
Air Force	5	–	3	10	–	3
Wyoming	5	–	3	7	–	6
Utah State	5	–	3	6	–	7
Colorado State	3	–	5	3	–	9
New Mexico	0	–	8	2	–	10
West Division
No. 24 Fresno State xy$	7	–	1	10	–	4
San Diego State	5	–	3	7	–	6
San Jose State	5	–	3	7	–	5
UNLV	3	–	5	5	–	7
Hawaii	2	–	6	3	–	10
Nevada	0	–	8	2	–	10
Championship: Fresno State 28, Boise State 16
$ – Conference champion; x – Division champion/co-champions; y – Championship game participant; Rankings from AP Poll

The 2022 Fresno State Bulldogs football team represented California State University, Fresno as a member of the Mountain West Conference during the 2022 NCAA Division I FBS football season. They were led by head coach Jeff Tedford, who was coaching his fourth overall season with the program. The Bulldogs played their home games at Valley Children’s Stadium in Fresno, California.

== Schedule ==
Fresno State and the Mountain West Conference announced the 2022 football schedule on February 16, 2022.

Date	Time	Opponent	Site	TV	Result	Attendance
September 1	7:30 p.m.	Cal Poly*	Bulldog Stadium; Fresno, CA	FS1	W 35−7	36,011
September 10	7:30 p.m.	Oregon State*	Bulldog Stadium; Fresno, CA	CBSSN	L 32−35	41,031
September 17	7:30 p.m.	at No. 7 USC*	Los Angeles Memorial Coliseum; Los Angeles, CA	FOX	L 17−45	67,226
October 1	12:30 p.m.	at UConn*	Rentschler Field; East Hartford, CT	CBSSN	L 14−19	20,952
October 8	6:45 p.m.	at Boise State	Albertsons Stadium; Boise, ID (rivalry)	FS1	L 20−40	37,663
October 15	7:45 p.m.	San Jose State^{†}	Bulldog Stadium; Fresno, CA (rivalry)	FS2	W 17–10	41,031
October 22	3:30 p.m.	at New Mexico	University Stadium; Albuquerque, NM	FS2	W 41–9	14,667
October 29	7:30 p.m.	San Diego State	Bulldog Stadium; Fresno, CA (rivalry)	FS1	W 32–28	37,107
November 5	7:30 p.m.	Hawaii	Bulldog Stadium; Fresno, CA (rivalry)	FS2	W 55–13	39,005
November 11	7:30 p.m.	at UNLV	Allegiant Stadium; Paradise, NV	CBSSN	W 37–30	23,146
November 19	7:30 p.m.	at Nevada	Mackay Stadium; Reno, NV	CBSSN	W 41–14	12,501
November 25	7:00 p.m.	Wyoming	Bulldog Stadium; Fresno, CA	FS1	W 30–0	40,214
December 3	2:00 p.m.	at Boise State	Albertsons Stadium; Boise, ID (MW Championship Game)	FOX	W 28–16	24,037
December 17	12:30 p.m.	vs. Washington State*	SoFi Stadium; Inglewood, CA (LA Bowl)	ABC	W 29–6	32,405
*Non-conference game; ^{†}Homecoming; Rankings from AP Poll (and CFP Rankings, after November 1) - Released prior to game; All times are in Pacific time

== Rankings ==
Ranking movements Legend: ██ Increase in ranking ██ Decrease in ranking — = Not ranked RV = Received votes
	Week															
Poll	Pre	1	2	3	4	5	6	7	8	9	10	11	12	13	14	Final
AP	RV	RV	—	—	—	—	—	—	—	—	—	—	RV	RV	RV	24
Coaches	RV	RV	—	—	—	—	—	—	—	—	—	—	—	RV	RV	24
CFP	Not released									—	—	—	—	—	—	Not released

== Roster ==
2022 Fresno State Bulldogs football team roster
Players
Coaches
Offense

Pos.	#	Name	Class
WR	0	Mac Delana	Jr
WR	1	Nikko Remigio	Sr
WR	2	Zane Pope	Sr
WR	3	Erik Brooks	Sr
WR	4	Emoryie Edwards	Sr
WR	5	Jalen Cropper	Sr
QB	6	Matt Robinson	Sr
RB	7	Jordan Mims	Sr
WR	8	Ty Jones	Sr
QB	9	Jake Haener	Sr
QB	10	Logan Fife	So
WR	11	Josh Kelly	Jr
QB	13	Jaylen Henderson	Fr
QB	15	Joshua Wood	Fr
QB	16	Alec Trujillo	Jr
TE	17	Kamron Beachem	Fr
WR	18	Jalen Moss	Fr
WR	19	Josiah Freeman	So
RB	20	Simi Bakare	Sr
RB	22	Malik Sherrod	So
RB	24	Justin Guin	Fr
RB	25	Caden Rodgers	Fr
WR	26	Isaiah Batton	So
RB	27	Ryan Warkentin	Fr
RB	28	Jevon Bigelow	Sr
RB	29	Johnathan Arceneaux	Fr
RB	49	Elijah Gilliam	So
OL	50	Tyrone Sampson Jr.	Sr
OL	51	Mose Vavao	Jr
OL	52	Amil Savage	Fr
OL	54	Bula Schmidt	Sr
OL	55	Nate Maier	Fr
OL	58	Marcus Simien	Fr
OL	63	Daniel Taumalolo	Jr
OL	69	Jacob Spomer	So
OL	70	Matai Bell	Fr
OL	71	Rolan Fullwood	Fr
OL	72	Dontae Bull	Sr
OL	73	Jacob Isaia	Sr
OL	74	Julian Polendo	So
OL	75	Braylen Nelson	So
OL	77	Toreon Penright	So
OL	78	Osmar Velez	Jr
OL	79	Joseph Church	So
TE	80	Zach Hartsfield	Sr
WR	81	Jordan Brown	Jr
WR	82	Joshua Johnson	Fr
TE	84	Tre Watson	So
WR	85	Nathan Acevedo	Fr
TE	86	Jake Boust	Jr
TE	87	Raymond Pauwels Jr.	Sr
TE	88	Merhauti Xepera	Fr
TE	89	Jared Torres	Sr

Defense

Pos.	#	Name	Class
LB	0	Charlotin Charles	Fr
LB	1	Raymond Scott	Sr
DB	2	Elijah Gates	Sr
DB	3	Alzillion Hamilton	Fr
DL	4	Andres Fox	Sr
DL	5	Devo Bridges	Jr
LB	6	Levelle Bailey	Sr
DB	7	Reggie Strong	Jr
DB	8	Jalen Williams	Fr
DB	10	Kosi Agina	Jr
DB	11	Cale Sanders Jr.	So
DB	13	Justin Houston	Jr
DB	15	Julian Neal	Fr
DB	16	Rian Fields	Sr
DL	17	Johnny Hudson Jr.	Jr
DE	18	Isaiah Sanders	Sr
LB	19	Zeke Branham	Fr
DB	20	Cam Lockridge	Jr
DB	22	Steven Comstock	Sr
DL	23	Jacob Holmes	Fr
DB	24	Chrishawn Gordon	So
DB	25	Emari Pait	Fr
LB	26	Tim Thomas	Fr
DB	27	L. J. Early	Sr
DB	28	Jomarion Briggs	Fr
DB	29	Jayden Davis	Fr
LB	30	Tanner Blount	Jr
LB	31	Phoenix Jackson	Fr
DB	32	Evan Williams	Sr
DB	33	Bralyn Lux	Jr
DL	34	Frankco Gratton Jr.	Fr
LB	35	Malachi Langley	Jr
DB	37	Ryan Wilson	So
DB	40	Carlton Johnson	Jr
LB	42	Tyler Mello	Jr
DB	43	Morice Norris	Jr
DL	44	John Sniffen	Jr
LB	47	Seth Scheidt	Fr
DL	50	Charles Remlinger	Jr
DE	52	Da'Marcus Johnson	Sr
DL	54	Sione Noa	Fr
DT	55	Leonard Payne Jr.	Jr
DL	58	Miles Bailey	Fr
DT	91	Matt Lawson	Sr
DL	92	Gavriel Lightfoot	Fr
DL	94	Julius Gandy	Jr
DL	97	Jahzon Jacks	Fr
DE	99	David Perales	Sr

Special teams

Pos.	#	Name	Class
LS	36	Nick D'Ambra	Sr
LS	40	Michael Munoz	So
K	41	Andre Meono	So
P	45	Carson King	Sr
K	46	Dylan Lynch	Fr
K	48	Abraham Montano	So
K	99	Jared Zirkel	Fr

Head coach

- Jeff Tedford

Coordinators/assistant coaches

- Tim Skipper – Assistant head coach / linebackers
- Kirby Moore – Offensive coordinator
- Kevin Coyle – Defensive coordinator
- John Baxter – Assistant head coach / tight ends / special teams coordinator
- Jethro Franklin – Defensive line / defensive run coordinator
- Pat McCann – Wide receivers / pass game coordinator
- James Montgomery – Running backs
- Saga Tuitele – Offensive line
- J. D. Williams – Defensive backs
- Jim Nelson – Nickelbacks
- Patrick Belony – Defensive graduate assistant
- Ben Watkins – Defensive graduate assistant
- Braelon Roberts – Offensive graduate assistant
- Matt Smith – Offensive graduate assistant

Legend

- (C) Team captain
- (S) Suspended
- (I) Ineligible
- Injured
- Redshirt

Roster
Last update: 9/14/22

== Game summaries ==
=== Cal Poly ===
Game One – Cal Poly Mustangs (0–0) at Fresno State Bulldogs (0–0)

Quarter	1	2	3	4	Total
Mustangs	0	7	0	0	7
Bulldogs	21	0	7	7	35

at Bulldog Stadium • Fresno, California

- Date: Thursday, September 1, 2022
- Game time: 7:30 p.m. PST
- Game weather: Sunny • Temperature: 102 °F (39 °C) • Wind: NW 10 mph
- Game attendance: 36,011
- Referee: Christian Watson
- TV announcers (FS1): Eric Collins (play-by-play) & Devin Gardner (analyst)

Game information

First quarter

- (8:37) FRES – Jordan Mims 1-yard run, Abraham Montano kick (Drive: 9 plays, 68 yards, 4:40; Fresno State 7–0)
- (3:54) FRES – Nikko Remigio 13-yard run, Abraham Montano kick (Drive: 9 plays, 93 yards, 3:49; Fresno State 14–0)
- (0:29) FRES – Jordan Mims 1-yard run, Abraham Montano kick (Drive: 6 plays, 75 yards, 2:06; Fresno State 21–0)

Second quarter

- (11:54) CP – Bryson Allen 9-yard pass from Jaden Jones, Jaden Ohlsen kick (Drive: 9 plays, 75 yards, 3:35; Fresno State 21–7)

Third quarter

- (8:53) FRES – Jordan Mims 18-yard pass from Jake Haener, Abraham Montano kick (Drive: 3 plays, 34 yards, 1:05; Fresno State 28–7)

Fourth quarter

- (8:53) FRES – Raymond Pauwels 8-yard pass from Jake Haener, Abraham Montano kick (Drive: 16 plays, 95 yards, 6:52; Fresno State 35–7)

Statistics	CP	FRES
First downs	17	32
Plays–yards	68–317	75–549
Rushes–yards	30–106	33–175
Passing yards	211	370
Passing: comp–att–int	20–38–0	35–42–0
Turnovers		
Time of possession	26:19	33:41

Team	Category	Player	Statistics
Cal Poly	Passing	Jaden Jones	20/38, 211 yards, TD
Cal Poly	Rushing	Jaden Jones	9 carries, 59 yards
Cal Poly	Receiving	Chris Coleman	3 receptions 74 yards
Fresno State	Passing	Jake Haener	35/41, 370 yards, 2 TD
Fresno State	Rushing	Jordan Mims	15 carries, 76 yards, 2 TD
Fresno State	Receiving	Nikko Remigio	9 receptions, 100 yards

=== Oregon State ===
Game Two – Oregon State Beavers (1–0) at Fresno State Bulldogs (1–0)

Quarter	1	2	3	4	Total
Beavers	7	7	7	14	35
Bulldogs	7	6	10	9	32

at Bulldog Stadium • Fresno, California

- Date: Saturday, September 10, 2022
- Game time: 7:30 p.m. PST
- Game weather: Cloudy • Temperature: 88 °F (31 °C) • Wind: NW 12 mph
- Game attendance: 41,031
- Referee: Jonathan Noli
- TV announcers (CBSN): Alex Del Barrio (play-by-play) & Donte Whitner (analyst)

Game information

First quarter

- (5:39) ORST – Jack Colletto 2-yard run, Everett Hayes kick (Drive: 13 plays, 47 yards, 6:52; Oregon State 7–0)
- (2:19) FRES – Jordan Mims 1-yard run, Abraham Montano kick (Drive: 6 plays, 73 yards, 3:20; Tied 7–7)

Second quarter

- (8:57) ORST – Silas Bolden 36-yard run, Everett Hayes kick (Drive: 4 plays, 65 yards, 1:49; Oregon State 14–7)
- (3:04) FRES – Abraham Montano 26-yard field goal (Drive: 13 plays, 67 yards, 5:53; Oregon State 14–10)
- (0:05) FRES – Abraham Montano 23-yard field goal (Drive: 8 plays, 30 yards, 1:52; Oregon State 14–13)

Third quarter

- (10:21) FRES – Abraham Montano 43-yard field goal (Drive: 11 plays, 49 yards, 4:39; Fresno State 16–14)
- (6:04) FRES – Jordan Mims 11-yard run, Abraham Montano kick (Drive: 4 plays, 80 yards, 1:21; Fresno State 23–14)
- (4:04) ORST – Deshaun Fenwick 4-yard run, Everett Hayes kick (Drive: 5 plays, 77 yards, 1:54; Fresno State 23–21)

Fourth quarter

- (10:31) FRES – Abraham Montano 37-yard field goal (Drive: 8 plays, 49 yards, 3:01; Fresno State 26–21)
- (1:50) ORST – Tre'Shaun Harrison 17-yard pass from Chance Nolan, Silas Bolden–Chance Nolan 2-point pass (Drive: 5 plays, 66 yards, 2:29; Oregon State 29–26)
- (1:05) FRES – Erik Brooks 4-yard pass from Jake Haener, kick failed (Drive: 5 plays, 75 yards, 0:45; Fresno State 32–29)
- (0:00) ORST – Jack Colletto 2-yard run, no kick end of game (Drive: 7 plays, 73 yards, 0:58; Oregon State 35–32)

Statistics	ORST	FRES
First downs	23	24
Plays–yards	64–397	76–492
Rushes–yards	37–178	29–132
Passing yards	219	360
Passing: comp–att–int	14–27–0	30–47–0
Turnovers		
Time of possession	26:50	33:10

Team	Category	Player	Statistics
Oregon State	Passing	Chance Nolan	14/27, 219 yards, TD
Oregon State	Rushing	Deshaun Fenwick	19 carries, 102 yards, TD
Oregon State	Receiving	Luke Musgrave	5 receptions, 80 yards
Fresno State	Passing	Jake Haener	30/46, 360 yards, TD
Fresno State	Rushing	Jordan Mims	21 carries, 122 yards, 2 TD
Fresno State	Receiving	Nikko Remigio	6 receptions, 100 yards

=== No. 7 USC ===
Game Three – Fresno State Bulldogs (1–1) at #7 USC Trojans (2–0)

Quarter	1	2	3	4	Total
Bulldogs	0	10	7	0	17
No. 7 Trojans	14	7	14	10	45

at Los Angeles Memorial Coliseum • Los Angeles, California

- Date: Saturday, September 17, 2022
- Game time: 7:30 p.m. PST
- Game weather: Partly Cloudy • Temperature: 71 °F (22 °C) • Wind:
- Game attendance: 67,226
- Referee: Steven Strimling
- TV announcers (FOX): Noah Eagle (play-by-play) & Mark Helfrich (analyst)

Game information

First quarter

- (10:12) USC – Jordan Addison 4-yard pass from Caleb Williams, Denis Lynch kick (Drive: 12 plays, 73 yards, 4:55; USC 7–0)
- (3:38) USC – Caleb Williams 8-yard run, Denis Lynch kick (Drive: 11 plays, 65 yards, 5:31; USC 14–0)

Second quarter

- (14:53) FRES – Abraham Montano 23-yard field goal (Drive: 10 plays, 70 yards, 3:40; USC 14–3)
- (8:02) USC – Caleb Williams 1-yard run, Denis Lynch kick (Drive: 15 plays, 83 yards, 6:42; USC 21–3)
- (6:38) FRES – Erik Brooks 39-yard pass from Jake Haener, Abraham Montano kick (Drive: 5 plays, 75 yards, 1:24; USC 21–10)

Third quarter

- (11:15) USC – Austin Jones 3-yard run, Denis Lynch kick (Drive: 5 plays, 46 yards, 1:47; USC 28–10)
- (9:08) FRES – Malik Sherrod 32-yard run, Abraham Montano kick (Drive: 5 plays, 71 yards, 1:57; USC 28–17)
- (7:20) FRES – Travis Dye 25-yard run, Denis Lynch kick (Drive: 4 plays, 75 yards, 1:42; USC 35–17)

Fourth quarter

- (14:47) USC – Malcolm Epps 10-yard pass from Caleb Williams, Denis Lynch kick (Drive: 10 plays, 70 yards, 3:41; USC 42–17)
- (4:10) USC – Denis Lynch 41-yard field goal (Drive: 9 plays, 61 yards, 5:17; USC 45–17)

Statistics	FRES	USC
First downs	23	29
Plays–yards	64–421	76–517
Rushes–yards	32–164	38–233
Passing yards	257	284
Passing: comp–att–int	21–30–1	25–37–0
Turnovers		
Time of possession	25:55	34:25

Team	Category	Player	Statistics
Fresno State	Passing	Logan Fife	11/12, 140 yards
Fresno State	Rushing	Jordan Mims	15 carries, 114 yards
Fresno State	Receiving	Erik Brooks	6 receptions, 89 yards, TD
USC	Passing	Caleb Williams	25/37, 284 yards, 2 TD
USC	Rushing	Austin Jones	12 carries, 110 yards, TD
USC	Receiving	Mario Williams	6 receptions, 77 yards

=== UConn ===
Game Four – Fresno State Bulldogs (1–2) at Uconn Huskies (1–4)

Quarter	1	2	3	4	Total
Bulldogs	0	7	7	0	14
Huskies	3	3	6	7	19

at Rentschler Field • East Hartford, Connecticut

- Date: Saturday, October 1, 2022
- Game time: 12:30 p.m. PST
- Game weather: Partly Cloudy • Temperature: 67 °F (19 °C) • Wind:
- Game attendance: 20,952
- Referee: Stuart Mullins
- TV announcers (CBSN): Meghan McPeak (play-by-play), Christian Fauria (analyst), & Justin Walters (sideline)

Game information

First quarter

- (4:06) UCONN – Noe Ruelas 26-yard field goal (Drive: 8 plays, 24 yards, 3:15; UConn 3–0)

Second quarter

- (9:33) FRES – Nikko Remigio 87-yard punt return (Fresno State 7–3)
- (4:51) UCONN – Noe Ruelas 28-yard field goal (Drive: 9 plays, 76 yards, 4:37; Fresno State 7–6)

Third quarter

- (12:50) FRES – Jordan Mims 2-yard run, Abraham Montano kick (Drive: 5 plays, 62 yards, 2:03; Fresno State 14–6)
- (5:18) UCONN – Aaron Turner 5-yard pass from Zion Turner, 2-point pass failed (Drive: 9 plays, 76 yards, 4:37; Fresno State 14–12)

Fourth quarter

- (2:20) UCONN – Davontae Houston 17-yard run, Noe Ruelas kick (Drive: 11 plays, 94 yards, 6:06; UConn 19–14)

Statistics	FRES	UCONN
First downs	14	19
Plays–yards	48–187	71–313
Rushes–yards	26–30	55–183
Passing yards	157	130
Passing: comp–att–int	16–22–2	8–16–0
Turnovers		
Time of possession	23:24	36:36

Team	Category	Player	Statistics
Fresno State	Passing	Logan Fife	16/22, 157 yards, 2 INT
Fresno State	Rushing	Jordan Mims	15 carries, 39 yards, TD
Fresno State	Receiving	Jalen Cropper	5 receptions, 76 yards
UConn	Passing	Zion Turner	8/15, 130 yards, TD
UConn	Rushing	Devontae Houston	23 carries, 105 yards, TD
UConn	Receiving	Kevens Clercius	2 receptions, 79 yards

=== Boise State ===
Game Five – Fresno State Bulldogs (1–3) at Boise State Broncos (3–2)

Quarter	1	2	3	4	Total
Bulldogs	7	10	3	0	20
Broncos	7	13	7	13	40

at Albertsons Stadium • Boise, Idaho

- Date: Saturday, October 8, 2022
- Game time: 6:45 p.m. PST
- Game weather: Partly Cloudy • Temperature: 65 °F (18 °C) • Wind:
- Game attendance: 37,663
- Referee: David Alvarez
- TV announcers (FS1): Alex Faust (play-by-play), & Petros Papadakis (analyst)

Game information

First quarter

- (10:58) BSU – Billy Bowens 9-yard pass from Taylen Green, Jonah Dalmas kick (Drive: 6 plays, 55 yards, 2:14; Boise State 7–0)
- (5:33) FRES – Logan Fife 1-yard run, Abraham Montano kick (Drive: 4 plays, 11 yards, 1:58; Tied 7–7)

Second quarter

- (13:33) BSU – Jonah Dalmas 24-yard field goal, (Drive: 15 plays, 68 yards, 6:55; Boise State 10–7)
- (9:58) BSU – Jonah Dalmas 21-yard field goal, (Drive: 4 plays, 5 yards, 1:27; Boise State 13–7)
- (3:59) FRES – Nikko Remigio 5-yard run, Abraham Montano kick (Drive: 12 plays, 72 yards, 5:53; Fresno State 14–13)
- (2:58) BSU – Ashton Jeanty 13-yard run, Jonah Dalmas kick (Drive: 3 plays, 78 yards, 0:56; Boise State 20–14)
- (0:00) FRES – Abraham Montano 35-yard field goal, (Drive: 14 plays, 66 yards, 2:53; Boise State 20–17)

Third quarter

- (8:57) FRES – Abraham Montano 29-yard field goal, (Drive: 8 plays, 40 yards, 3:53; Tied 20–20)
- (0:46) BSU – George Holani 5-yard pass from Taylen Green, Jonah Dalmas kick (Drive: 11 plays, 63 yards, 4:49; Boise State 27–20)

Fourth quarter

- (9:52) BSU – Jonah Dalmas 33-yard field goal, (Drive: 8 plays, 36 yards, 4:17; Boise State 30–20)
- (6:32) BSU – Jonah Dalmas 24-yard field goal, (Drive: 6 plays, 37 yards, 3:14; Boise State 33–20)
- (0:35) BSU – Ashton Jeanty 12-yard run, Jonah Dalmas kick (Drive: 11 plays, 62 yards, 4:57; Boise State 40–20)

Statistics	FRES	BSU
First downs	15	21
Plays–yards	61–228	70–443
Rushes–yards	34–94	52–316
Passing yards	134	127
Passing: comp–att–int	14–23–2	10–19–1
Turnovers		
Time of possession	25:25	34:35

Team	Category	Player	Statistics
Fresno State	Passing	Logan Fife	14/23, 134 yards, 2 INT
Fresno State	Rushing	Jordan Mims	21 carries, 61 yards
Fresno State	Receiving	Raymond Pauwels	2 receptions, 42 yards
Boise State	Passing	Taylen Green	10/19, 127 yards, 2 TD, INT
Boise State	Rushing	George Holani	17 carries, 157 yards
Boise State	Receiving	Riley Smith	2 receptions, 44 yards

=== San Jose State ===
Game Six – San Jose State Spartans (4–1) at Fresno State Bulldogs (1–4)

Quarter	1	2	3	4	Total
Spartans	0	10	0	0	10
Bulldogs	0	7	7	3	17

at Bulldog Stadium • Fresno, California

- Date: Saturday, October 15, 2022
- Game time: 7:45 p.m. PST
- Game weather: Partly Cloudy • Temperature: 78 °F (26 °C) • Wind:
- Game attendance: 41,031
- Referee: Christian Watson
- TV announcers (FS2): Jeff Levering (play-by-play), & Petros Papadakis (analyst)

Game information

First quarter

- No scoring plays

Second quarter

- (5:34) SJSU – Taren Schive 24-yard field goal, (Drive: 11 plays, 59 yards, 4:04; San Jose State 3–0)
- (1:57) FRES – Jordan Mims 6-yard run, Abraham Montano kick (Drive: 8 plays, 74 yards, 3:37; Fresno State 7–3)
- (0:15) SJSU – Elijah Cooks 32-yard pass from Chaven Cordeiro, Taren Schive kick (Drive: 1 play, 32 yards, 0:15; San Jose State 10–7)

Third quarter

- (1:09) FRES – Nikko Remigio 7-yard pass from Logan Fife, Abraham Montano kick (Drive: 9 plays, 80 yards, 4:23; Fresno State 14–10)

Fourth quarter

- (0:10) FRES – Abraham Montano 28-yard field goal, (Drive: 4 plays, 5 yards, 1:42; Fresno State 17–10)

Statistics	SJSU	FRES
First downs	20	19
Plays–yards	66–331	68–358
Rushes–yards	23–37	36–111
Passing yards	294	247
Passing: comp–att–int	22–46–1	23–31–1
Turnovers		
Time of possession	27:05	32:55

Team	Category	Player	Statistics
San Jose State	Passing	Chevan Cordeiro	22/45, 294 yards, TD, INT
San Jose State	Rushing	Kairee Robinson	12 carries, 40 yards
San Jose State	Receiving	Elijah Cooks	7 receptions, 140 yards, TD
Fresno State	Passing	Logan Fife	23/31, 247 yards, TD, INT
Fresno State	Rushing	Jordan Mims	17 carries, 76 yards, TD
Fresno State	Receiving	Nikko Remigio	6 receptions, 54 yards, TD

=== New Mexico ===
Game Seven – Fresno State Bulldogs (2–4) at New Mexico Lobos (2–5)

Quarter	1	2	3	4	Total
Bulldogs	10	3	14	14	41
Lobos	3	3	3	0	9

at University Stadium • Albuquerque, New Mexico

- Date: Saturday, October 22, 2022
- Game time: 3:30 p.m. PST
- Game weather: Partly Cloudy • Temperature: 72 °F (22 °C) • Wind:
- Game attendance: 14,667
- Referee: Timothy Davis
- TV announcers (FS2): Eric Collins (play-by-play), & Devin Gardner (analyst)

Game information

First quarter

- (10:01) FRES – Abraham Montano 26-yard field goal (Drive: 12 plays, 67 yards, 5:03; Fresno State 3–0)
- (7:26) UNM – Luke Drzewiecki 29-yard field goal (Drive: 5 plays, 18 yards, 2:59; Tied 3–3)
- (1:07) FRES – Logan Fife 2-yard run, Abraham Montano kick (Drive: 13 plays, 71 yards, 5:51; Fresno State 10–3)

Second quarter

- (2:46) UNM – Luke Drzewiecki 24-yard field goal (Drive: 10 plays, 45 yards, 4:40; Fresno State 10–6)
- (0:00) FRES – Abraham Montano 38-yard field goal (Drive: 12 plays, 55 yards, 7:26; Fresno State 13–6)

Third quarter

- (12:44) FRES – Jalen Cropper 75-yard pass from Logan Fife, Abraham Montano kick (Drive: 1 play, 75 yards, 0:12; Fresno State 20–6)
- (7:10) FRES – Logan Fife 30-yard run, Abraham Montano kick (Drive: 8 plays, 64 yards, 3:26; Fresno State 27–6)
- (1:59) UNM – Luke Drzewiecki 33-yard field goal (Drive: 4 plays, 3 yards, 1:54; Fresno State 27–9)

Fourth quarter

- (12:46) FRES – Malik Sherrod 2-yard run, Abraham Montano kick (Drive: 8 plays, 67 yards, 4:05; Fresno State 34–9)
- (4:42) FRES – Jordan Mims 22-yard run, Abraham Montano kick (Drive: 10 plays, 70 yards, 6:26; Fresno State 41–9)

Statistics	FRES	UNM
First downs	26	8
Plays–yards	79–510	44–138
Rushes–yards	50–285	27–87
Passing yards	225	51
Passing: comp–att–int	19–29–1	9–17–0
Turnovers		
Time of possession	32:37	27:23

Team	Category	Player	Statistics
Fresno State	Passing	Logan Fife	19/29, 225 yards, TD, INT
Fresno State	Rushing	Jordan Mims	26 carries, 165 yards, TD
Fresno State	Receiving	Jalen Cropper	9 receptions, 158 yards, TD
New Mexico	Passing	Justin Holaday	8/15, 37 yards
New Mexico	Rushing	Justin Holaday	11 carries, 39 yards
New Mexico	Receiving	Duece Jones	1 reception, 15 yards

=== San Diego State ===
Game Eight – San Diego State Aztecs (4–3) at Fresno State Bulldogs (3–4)

Quarter	1	2	3	4	Total
Aztecs	7	14	7	0	28
Bulldogs	3	7	7	15	32

at Bulldog Stadium • Fresno, California

- Date: Saturday, October 29, 2022
- Game time: 7:30 p.m. PST
- Game weather: Partly Cloudy • Temperature: 68 °F (20 °C) • Wind:
- Game attendance: 37,107
- Referee: Michael Vandervelde
- TV announcers (FS1): Jeff Levering (play-by-play), & Petros Papadakis (analyst)

Game information

First quarter

- (8:11) FRES – Abraham Montano 35-yard field goal (Drive: 13 plays, 68 yards, 6:49; Fresno State 3–0)
- (2:56) SDSU – Jalen Mayden 28-yard run, (Jack Browning kick) (Drive: 9 plays, 92 yards, 5:15; San Diego State 7–3)

Second quarter

- (12:19) SDSU – Kenan Christon 26-yard pass from Jalen Mayden, (Jack Browning kick) (Drive: 6 plays, 74 yards, 3:17; San Diego State 14–3)
- (8:35) FRES – Nikko Remigio 21-yard pass from Jake Haener, (Abraham Montano kick) (Drive: 9 plays, 75 yards, 3:44; San Diego State 14–10)
- (1:45) SDSU – Jalen Mayden 1-yard run, (Jack Browning kick) (Drive: 9 plays, 81 yards, 4:02; San Diego State 21–10)

Third quarter

- (1:45) SDSU – Jesse Matthews 7-yard pass from Jalen Mayden, (Jarrett Reeser kick) (Drive: 8 plays, 80 yards, 4:17; San Diego State 28–10)
- (0:00) FRES – Zane Pope 8-yard pass from Jake Haener, (Abraham Montano kick) (Drive: 2 plays, 10 yards, 0:35; San Diego State 28–17)

Fourth quarter

- (1:09) FRES – Jordan Mims 3-yard run, (Zane Pope–Jake Haener 2-point pass) (Drive: 11 plays, 80 yards, 2:46; San Diego State 28–25)
- (0:56) FRES – Nikko Remigio 37-yard pass from Jake Haener, (Abraham Montano kick) (Drive: 1 play, 37 yards, 0:09; Fresno State 32–28)

Statistics	SDSU	FRES
First downs	22	23
Plays–yards	63–449	72–391
Rushes–yards	38–158	26–-3
Passing yards	291	394
Passing: comp–att–int	19–25–2	34–45–2
Turnovers		
Time of possession	29:05	30:55

Team	Category	Player	Statistics
San Diego State	Passing	Jalen Mayden	19/24, 291 yards, 2 TD, 2 INT
San Diego State	Rushing	Jalen Mayden	8 carries, 43 yards, 2 TD
San Diego State	Receiving	Kenan Christon	2 receptions, 75 yards, TD
Fresno State	Passing	Jake Haener	34/45, 394 yards, 3 TD, 2 INT
Fresno State	Rushing	Jordan Mims	13 carries, 32 yards, TD
Fresno State	Receiving	Zane Pope	10 receptions, 143 yards, TD

=== Hawaii ===
Game Nine – Hawaii Rainbow Warriors (2–7) at Fresno State Bulldogs (4–4)

Quarter	1	2	3	4	Total
Rainbow Warriors	0	0	0	13	13
Bulldogs	17	14	10	14	55

at Bulldog Stadium • Fresno, California

- Date: Saturday, November 5, 2022
- Game time: 7:30 p.m. PST
- Game weather: Partly Cloudy • Temperature: 65 °F (18 °C) • Wind:
- Game attendance: 39,005
- Referee: Christian Watson
- TV announcers (FS2): Guy Haberman (play-by-play), & Will Blackmon (analyst)

Game information

First quarter

- (6:54) FRES – Abraham Montano 31-yard field goal (Drive: 10 plays, 56 yards, 3:52; Fresno State 3–0)
- (4:55) FRES – Cam Lockridge 31-yard interception return, Abraham Montano kick (Fresno State 10–0)
- (1:59) FRES – Jordan Mims 22-yard run, Abraham Montano kick (Drive: 6 plays, 81 yards, 2:14; Fresno State 17–0)

Second quarter

- (7:16) FRES – Jalen Cropper 7-yard pass from Jake Haener, Dylan Lynch kick (Drive: 14 plays, 71 yards, 5:42; Fresno State 24–0)
- (0:41) FRES – Erik Brooks 16-yard pass from Jake Haener, Dylan Lynch kick (Drive: 10 plays, 64 yards, 4:27; Fresno State 31–0)

Third quarter

- (9:12) FRES – Dylan Lynch 25-yard field goal (Drive: 11 plays, 68 yards, 5:48; Fresno State 34–0)
- (6:22) FRES – Jalen Cropper 59-yard pass from Jake Haener, Dylan Lynch kick (Drive: 2 plays, 71 yards, 0:27; Fresno State 41–0)

Fourth quarter

- (14:18) FRES – Nikko Remigio 11-yard pass from Jake Haener, Dylan Lynch kick (Drive: 7 plays, 78 yards, 3:51; Fresno State 48–0)
- (9:33) FRES – Elijah Gilliam 7-yard run, Dylan Lynch kick (Drive: 6 plays, 76 yards, 3:31; Fresno State 55–0)
- (3:46) HAW – Nasjzae Bryant-Lelei 1-yard run, Matthew Shipley kick (Drive: 13 plays, 75 yards, 5:47; Fresno State 55–7)
- (0:35) HAW – Tamatoa Mokiao-Atimalala 4-yard pass from Brayden Schager, kick blocked (Drive: 6 plays, 59 yards, 1:30; Fresno State 55–13)

Statistics	HAW	FRES
First downs	21	27
Plays–yards	73–367	68–572
Rushes–yards	34–158	39–245
Passing yards	204	327
Passing: comp–att–int	20–40–1	24–29–0
Turnovers		
Time of possession	27:44	32:16

Team	Category	Player	Statistics
Hawaii	Passing	Brayden Schager	20/40, 204 yards, TD, INT
Hawaii	Rushing	Tylan Hines	11 carries, 79 yards
Hawaii	Receiving	Tylan Hines	4 receptions, 48 yards
Fresno State	Passing	Jake Haener	24/29, 327 yards, 4 TD
Fresno State	Rushing	Jordan Mims	18 carries, 123 yards, TD
Fresno State	Receiving	Jalen Cropper	5 receptions, 93 yards, 2 TD

=== UNLV ===
Game Ten – Fresno State Bulldogs (5–4) at UNLV Rebels (4–5)

Quarter	1	2	3	4	Total
Bulldogs	7	7	10	13	37
Rebels	10	6	3	11	30

at Allegiant Stadium • Paradise, Nevada

- Date: Friday, November 11, 2022
- Game time: 7:30 p.m. PST
- Game weather: Partly Cloudy • Temperature: 61 °F (16 °C) • Wind:
- Game attendance: 23,146
- Referee: Kevin Boitmann
- TV announcers (CBSSN): Carter Blackburn (play-by-play), & Tom Herman (analyst)

Game information

First quarter

- (11:29) UNLV – Daniel Gutierrez 42-yard field goal (Drive: 10 plays, 51 yards, 3:31; UNLV 3–0)
- (8:29) FRES – Jalen Cropper 33-yard pass from Jake Haener, Dylan Lynch kick (Drive: 7 plays, 48 yards, 3:00; Fresno State 7–3)
- (1:12) UNLV – Doug Brumfield 5-yard run, Daniel Gutierrez kick (Drive: 15 plays, 75 yards, 7:17; UNLV 10–7)

Second quarter

- (9:39) UNLV – Daniel Gutierrez 48-yard field goal (Drive: 7 plays, 15 yards, 3:54; UNLV 13–7)
- (6:16) FRES – Jordan Mims 5-yard run, Dylan Lynch kick (Drive: 9 plays, 74 yards, 3:17; Fresno State 14–13)
- (0:17) UNLV – Daniel Gutierrez 27-yard field goal (Drive: 14 plays, 66 yards, 5:59; UNLV 16–14)

Third quarter

- (9:49) FRES – Dylan Lynch 26-yard field goal (Drive: 12 plays, 67 yards, 5:11; Fresno State 17–16)
- (3:15) FRES – Zane Pope 2-yard pass from Jake Haener, Dylan Lynch kick (Drive: 10 plays, 46 yards, 4:50; Fresno State 24–16)
- (0:48) UNLV – Daniel Gutierrez 38-yard field goal (Drive: 7 plays, 55 yards, 2:27; Fresno State 24–19)

Fourth quarter

- (10:57) FRES – Dylan Lynch 23-yard field goal (Drive: 10 plays, 52 yards, 4:43; Fresno State 27–19)
- (9:28) UNLV – Adin Robbins 66-yard run, Nick Williams–Kyle Williams Two-point pass (Drive: 5 plays, 75 yards, 1:29; Tied 27–27)
- (8:47) FRES – Jalen Cropper 60-yard pass from Jake Haener, Dylan Lynch kick (Drive: 3 plays, 79 yards, 0:37; Fresno State 34–27)
- (2:56) FRES – Dylan Lynch 29-yard field goal (Drive: 7 plays, 22 yards, 4:11; Fresno State 37–27)
- (0:13) UNLV – Daniel Gutierrez 33-yard field goal (Drive: 14 plays, 59 yards, 2:43; Fresno State 37–30)

Statistics	FRES	UNLV
First downs	21	22
Plays–yards	60–381	71–391
Rushes–yards	26–68	39–219
Passing yards	313	172
Passing: comp–att–int	28–36–0	18–34–0
Turnovers		
Time of possession	29:16	30:44

Team	Category	Player	Statistics
Fresno State	Passing	Jake Haener	28/36, 313 yards, 3 TD
Fresno State	Rushing	Jordan Mims	21 carries, 70 yards, TD
Fresno State	Receiving	Jalen Cropper	8 receptions, 164 yards, 2 TD
UNLV	Passing	Doug Brumfield	18/34, 172 yards
UNLV	Rushing	Aidan Robbins	26 carries, 144 yards, TD
UNLV	Receiving	Kyle Williams	6 receptions, 43 yards

=== Nevada ===
Game Eleven – Fresno State Bulldogs (6–4) at Nevada Wolf Pack (2–8)

Quarter	1	2	3	4	Total
Bulldogs	17	7	3	14	41
Wolf Pack	0	0	7	7	14

at Mackay Stadium • Reno, Nevada

- Date: Saturday, November 19, 2022
- Game time: 7:30 p.m. PST
- Game weather: Partly Cloudy • Temperature: 49 °F (9 °C) • Wind:
- Game attendance: 12,501
- Referee: Timothy Davis
- TV announcers (CBSSN): Chris Lewis (play-by-play), & Robert Turbin (analyst)

Game information

First quarter

- (9:29) FRES – Jake Haener 1-yard run, Dylan Lynch kick (Drive: 10 plays, 65 yards, 4:05; Fresno State 7–0)
- (5:50) FRES – Dylan Lynch 43-yard field goal (Drive: 7 plays, 49 yards, 1:37; Fresno State 10–0)
- (2:31) FRES – Mac Dalena 22-yard pass from Jake Haener, Dylan Lynch kick (Drive: 3 plays, 31 yards, 0:50; Fresno State 17–0)

Second quarter

- (6:34) FRES – Raymond Pauwels 3-yard pass from Jake Haener, Dylan Lynch kick (Drive: 11 plays, 75 yards, 4:31; Fresno State 24–0)

Third quarter

- (1:18) FRES – Dylan Lynch 35-yard field goal (Drive: 7 plays, 42 yards, 1:51; Fresno State 27–0)
- (0:40) NEV – Dalevon Campbell 73-yard pass from Nate Cox, Brandon Talton kick (Drive: 2 plays, 75 yards, 0:38; Fresno State 27–7)

Fourth quarter

- (10:03) FRES – Jordan Mims 22-yard run, Dylan Lynch kick (Drive: 7 plays, 62 yards, 3:44; Fresno State 34–7)
- (5:21) FRES – Jake Haener 1-yard run, Dylan Lynch kick (Drive: 4 plays, 97 yards, 2:02; Fresno State 41–7)
- (1:44) NEV – BJ Casteel 28-yard pass from Nate Cox, Brandon Talton kick (Drive: 10 plays, 75 yards, 3:37; Fresno State 41–14)

Statistics	FRES	NEV
First downs	26	16
Plays–yards	75–524	68–389
Rushes–yards	33–163	30–146
Passing yards	361	243
Passing: comp–att–int	29–42–0	16–38–2
Turnovers		
Time of possession	34:24	25:36

Team	Category	Player	Statistics
Fresno State	Passing	Jake Haener	29/42, 361 yards, 2 TD
Fresno State	Rushing	Jordan Mims	19 carries, 156 yards, TD
Fresno State	Receiving	Jalen Cropper	7 receptions, 136 yards
Nevada	Passing	Nate Cox	16/38, 243 yards, 2 TD, 2 INT
Nevada	Rushing	Toa Taua	17 carries, 93 yards
Nevada	Receiving	Dalevon Campbell	3 receptions, 120 yards, TD

=== Wyoming ===
Game Twelve – Wyoming Cowboys (7–4) at Fresno State Bulldogs (7–4)

Quarter	1	2	3	4	Total
Cowboys	0	0	0	0	0
Bulldogs	14	9	7	0	30

at Bulldog Stadium • Fresno, California

- Date: Friday, November 25, 2022
- Game time: 7:00 p.m. PST
- Game weather: Partly Cloudy • Temperature: 58 °F (14 °C) • Wind:
- Game attendance: 40,214
- Referee: Mike Cuttone
- TV announcers (FS1): Guy Haberman (play-by-play), & Will Blackmon (analyst)

Game information

First quarter

- (12:59) FRES – Jordan Mims 4-yard run, Abraham Montano kick (Drive: 5 plays, 66 yards, 2:01; Fresno State 7–0)
- (2:17) FRES – Nikko Remigio 6-yard pass from Jake Haener, Abraham Montano kick (Drive: 8 plays, 41 yards, 3:53; Fresno State 14–0)

Second quarter

- (10:50) FRES – Evan Williams blocks punt in end zone for a safety (Fresno State 16–0)
- (8:28) FRES – Jordan Mims 1-yard run, Abraham Montano kick (Drive: 6 plays, 27 yards, 2:09; Fresno State 23–0)

Third quarter

- (7:55) FRES – Jordan Mims 2-yard run, Abraham Montano kick (Drive: 2 plays, 4 yards, 0:41; Fresno State 30–0)

Fourth quarter

- No scoring plays

Statistics	WYO	FRES
First downs	12	18
Plays–yards	58–191	66–297
Rushes–yards	29–87	34–114
Passing yards	104	183
Passing: comp–att–int	12–30–2	21–32–0
Turnovers		
Time of possession	26:55	33:05

Team	Category	Player	Statistics
Wyoming	Passing	Andrew Peasley	12/30, 104 yards, 2 INT
Wyoming	Rushing	Titus Swen	24 carries, 75 yards
Wyoming	Receiving	Colin O'Brien	2 receptions, 31 yards
Fresno State	Passing	Jake Haener	21/32, 183 yards, TD
Fresno State	Rushing	Jordan Mims	16 carries, 52 yards, 3 TD
Fresno State	Receiving	Zane Pope	6 receptions, 83 yards

=== At Boise State (Mountain West Championship Game) ===
Game Thirteen – Fresno State Bulldogs (8–4) at Boise State Broncos (9–3)

Quarter	1	2	3	4	Total
Bulldogs	0	14	0	14	28
Broncos	0	6	3	7	16

at Albertsons Stadium • Boise, Idaho

- Date: Saturday, December 3, 2022
- Game time: 1:00 p.m. PST
- Game weather: Partly Cloudy • Temperature: 28 °F (−2 °C) • Wind:
- Game attendance: 24,037
- Referee: Tutashinda Salaam
- TV announcers (FOX): Tim Brando (play-by-play), & Spencer Tillman (analyst), & Petros Papadakis (sideline)

Game information

First quarter

No scoring plays

Second quarter

- (10:16) BSU – Jonah Dalmas 26-yard field goal (Drive: 15 plays, 71 yards, 5:55; Boise State 3–0)
- (3:54) FRES – Nikko Remigio 70-yard punt return, Abraham Montano kick (Fresno State 7–3)
- (1:18) FRES – Jordan Mims 2-yard run, Abraham Montano kick (Drive: 3 plays, 17 yards, 1:21; Fresno State 14–3)
- (0:02) BSU – Jonah Dalmas 47-yard field goal (Drive: 8 plays, 45 yards, 1:16; Fresno State 14–6)

Third quarter

- (10:04) BSU – Jonah Dalmas 44-yard field goal (Drive: 8 plays, 24 yards, 3:12; Fresno State 14–9)

Fourth quarter

- (14:49) FRES –Zane Pope 22-yard pass from Jake Haener, Abraham Montano kick (Drive: 13 plays, 87 yards, 6:16; Fresno State 21–9)
- (9:47) FRES – Jordan Mims 3-yard run, Abraham Montano kick (Drive: 6 plays, 34 yards, 3:36; Fresno State 28–9)
- (5:17) BSU – Davis Koetter 52-yard pass from Taylen Green, Jonah Dalmas kick (Drive: 4 plays, 64 yards, 1:08; Fresno State 28–16)

Statistics	FRES	BOIS
First downs	14	15
Plays–yards	62–245	68–321
Rushes–yards	35–61	30–146
Passing yards	184	175
Passing: comp–att–int	17–27–0	17–38–2
Turnovers		
Time of possession	33:31	26:29

Team	Category	Player	Statistics
Fresno State	Passing	Jake Haener	17/27, 184 yards, TD
Fresno State	Rushing	Jordan Mims	25 carries 83 yards, 2 TD
Fresno State	Receiving	Nikko Remigio	5 receptions, 68 yards
Boise State	Passing	Taylen Green	17/38, 175 yards, TD, 2 INT
Boise State	Rushing	George Holani	13 carries, 74 yards
Boise State	Receiving	Davis Koetter	5 receptions, 93 yards, TD

=== Vs. Washington State (LA Bowl) ===
Game Fourteen – Washington State Cougars (7–5) vs. Fresno State Bulldogs (9–4)

Quarter	1	2	3	4	Total
Cougars	0	0	6	0	6
Bulldogs	7	9	6	7	29

at SoFi Stadium • Inglewood, California

- Date: Saturday, December 17, 2022
- Game time: 12:30 p.m. PST
- Game weather: Sunny • Temperature: 66 °F (19 °C) • Wind: NW 2 mph
- Game attendance: 32,405
- Referee: Lee Hedrick
- TV announcers (ABC): Joe Tessitore (play-by-play), Greg McElroy (color), Molly McGrath (sideline)

Game information

First quarter

- (11:54) FRES – Zane Pope 22-yard pass from Jake Haener, Abraham Montano kick (Drive: 6 plays, 75 yards, 3:06; Fresno State 7–0)

Second quarter

- (12:52) FRES – Jordan Mims 4-yard run, Andre Meono kick (Drive: 4 plays, 23 yards, 2:00; Fresno State 14–0)
- (11:14) FRES – Leonard Payne Jr. sacks Washington State QB in end zone for a safety (Fresno State 16–0)

Third quarter

- (12:52) WSU – Nakia Watson 1-yard run, two-point conversion failed (Drive: 9 plays, 60 yards, 4:48; Fresno State 16–6)
- (0:36) FRES – Nikko Remigio 11-yard pass from Jake Haener, kick failed (Drive: 6 plays, 75 yards, 3:04; Fresno State 22–6)

Fourth quarter

- (8:29) FRES – Jordan Mims 2-yard run, Abraham Montano kick (Drive: 8 plays, 38 yards, 4:42; Fresno State 29–6)

Statistics	WSU	FRES
First downs	14	27
Plays–yards	60–183	68–502
Rushes–yards	28–46	32–219
Passing yards	137	283
Passing: comp–att–int	22–32–1	24–36–0
Turnovers		
Time of possession	26:59	32:43

Team	Category	Player	Statistics
Washington State	Passing	Cam Ward	22/32, 137 yards, INT
Washington State	Rushing	Nakia Watson	14 carries, 33 yards
Washington State	Receiving	Robert Ferrel	10 receptions, 64 yards
Fresno State	Passing	Jake Haener	24/36, 283 yards, 2 TD
Fresno State	Rushing	Jordan Mims	18 carries, 210 yards, 2 TD
Fresno State	Receiving	Nikko Remigio	5 receptions, 84 yards, TD
