= Lone Star, Fresno County, California =

Unincorporated community in California, United States

Lone Star
- Unincorporated community
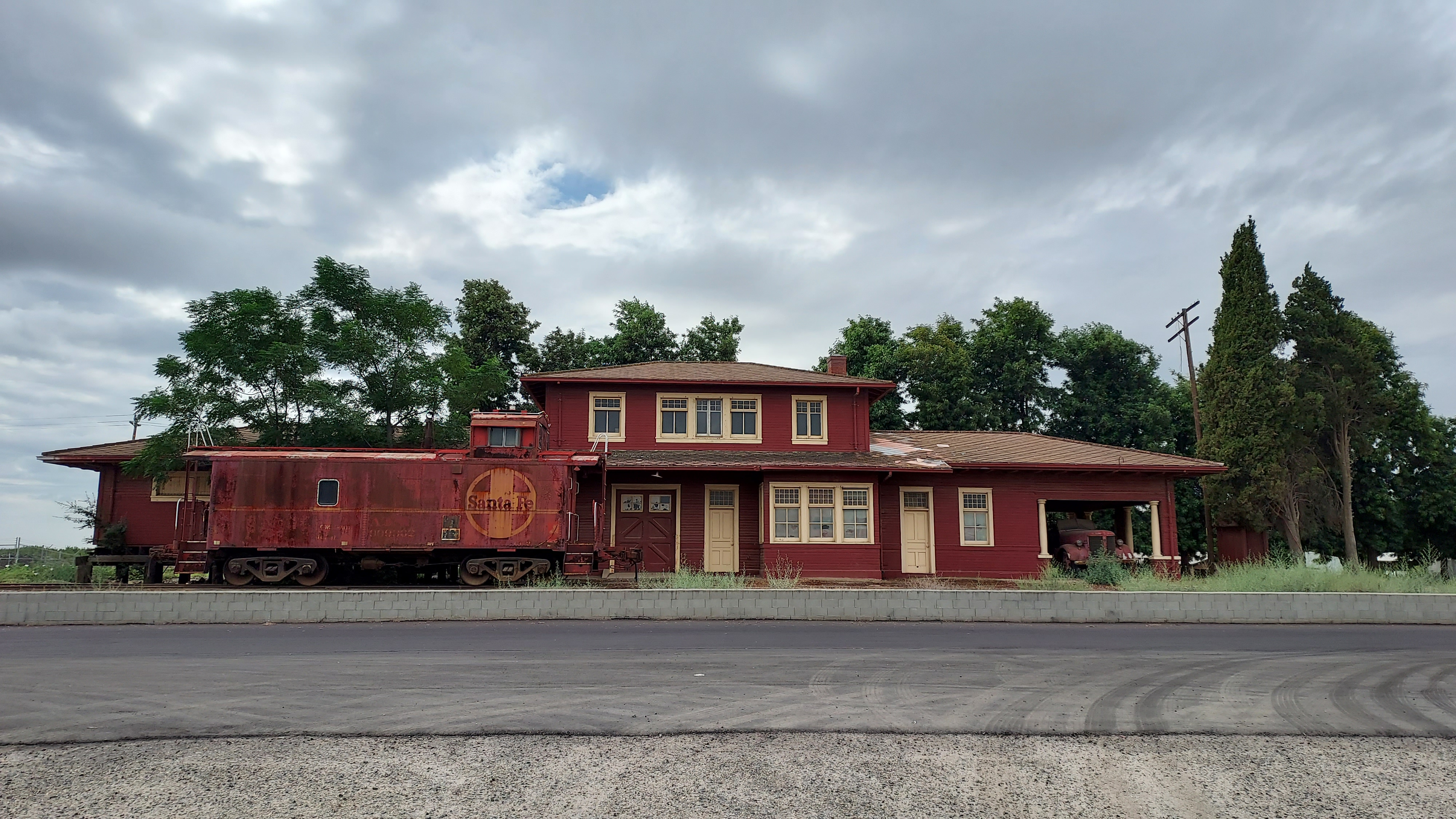
- The former train station in Lone Star

- Location in California Lone Star (the United States)
- Coordinates: 36°42′02″N 119°40′52″W
- Country: United States
- State: California
- County: Fresno
- Elevation: 318 ft (97 m)

Lone Star (formerly Lonestar) is an unincorporated community in Fresno County, California, United States. It is located on the Atchison, Topeka and Santa Fe Railroad, 3.25 miles (5 km) east-northeast of Malaga, at an elevation of 318 feet (97 m).

The Lonestar post office operated from 1891 to 1895 and from 1900 to 1910. The place was named by the first settlers after their former home state, Texas (the Lone Star State). Other sources, however, say that the town was named by schoolchildren.

The town and local school were established in 1882, and the town hall was built in 1899. Many of the early settlers were of Armenian-American descent. The Lone Star Elementary School is still active; students and a librarian at the school are said to have convinced Francis Ford Coppola to adapt the novel The Outsiders into the 1983 film of the same name.
