= Morice Norris =

American football player (born 2000)

Profile
- Position: Defensive back/Cornerback

Personal information
- Born: September 27, 2000 (age 26); Fresno, California, U.S.
- Listed height: 5 ft 11 in (1.80 m)
- Listed weight: 208 lb (94 kg)

Career information
- High school: Sanger High (Sanger, California)
- College: Orange Coast (2018–2019); Fresno State (2021–2023)
- NFL draft: 2024: undrafted

Career history
- Detroit Lions (2024); BC Lions (2026)*
- * Offseason or practice squad member only

Awards and highlights
- Second-team All-MW (2023)
- Stats at Pro Football Reference

Morice Norris Jr. (born September 27, 2000) is an American professional football defensive back/cornerback. He played college football for the Orange Coast Pirates and Fresno State Bulldogs.

== Early life ==
Norris was born on September 27, 2000, and grew up in Fresno, California. He grew up playing basketball and continued playing the sport while attending Sanger High School. As a senior, he tried out for the football team, after having been convinced to do so by two of his childhood friends, Arron Mosby and Jalen Moreno-Cropper, both of whom later played in the NFL. In his only year with the football team, he played at cornerback and wide receiver and led the team in interceptions, while also setting a school record for longest touchdown. He opted to begin his college football career at the junior college level with Orange Coast College.

== College career ==
Norris committed to Orange Coast as it allowed him to play both football and basketball. While attending the school, he lived in a two-bedroom apartment with five teammates, "staking out a corner of the living room and making the best of it," according to The Fresno Bee. As a freshman on the football team in 2018, he appeared in seven games and posted 12 tackles with three pass breakups. However, near the end of the season, he "blew out his knee," although he was able to return for his 2019 sophomore season. He played eight games as a sophomore and recorded 23 tackles, four pass breakups and an interception.

After his two years of junior college football, Norris had no scholarship offers and only one offer as a preferred walk-on, with the New Mexico State Aggies. He was not able to join the football team at first, due to the school reviewing his transcripts for admission, and the 2020 season was disrupted significantly by the COVID-19 pandemic. In June 2021, New Mexico State withdrew their preferred walk-on offer. The Fresno Bee noted that after his offer was withdrawn, "Norris was in scramble mode."

Norris initially considered quitting the sport altogether. However, he called an assistant coach for the Fresno State Bulldogs, who informed him of a camp that was being held the following day. Norris said "I packed up everything I got in a new car" and drove to Fresno, driving 980 miles in 15 hours and arriving two hours before the camp took place, at 8:00 a.m. After impressing there, he was given a spot on the team as a walk-on.

Norris was ineligible to play in the 2021 season. He was awarded a scholarship prior to the 2022 season. That year, he started at nickelback in 12 games and made 57 tackles, 8.0 tackles-for-loss (TFLs), six pass breakups and a sack. After receiving a waiver by the NCAA to play a final season in 2023, Norris totaled 59 tackles, 9.5 TFLs, 10 pass breakups and 3.5 sacks as a senior, being named second-team All-Mountain West Conference (MW) while starting all 13 games. He was a nominee for the Burlsworth Trophy as best player who started as a walk-on and was invited to the College Gridiron Showcase.

== Professional career ==
Pre-draft measurables
Height	Weight	Arm length	Hand span	40-yard dash	10-yard split	20-yard split	20-yard shuttle	Three-cone drill	Vertical jump	Broad jump	Bench press
5 ft 10 1/4 in (1.78 m)	181 lb (82 kg)	31 3/4 in (0.81 m)	9 1/4 in (0.23 m)	4.56 s	1.65 s	2.60 s	4.18 s	6.96 s	38.0 in (0.97 m)	10 ft 4 in (3.15 m)	10 reps
All values from Pro Day

=== Detroit Lions ===
After going unselected in the 2024 NFL draft, Norris signed with the Detroit Lions as an undrafted free agent. He was waived on August 14, 2024, due to an injury. Norris was re-signed to the team's practice squad on September 24. He was signed off the practice squad to the active roster on December 28.

On August 8, 2025, Norris sustained a major injury during the Lions' Week 1 preseason game against the Atlanta Falcons that led to the game being prematurely suspended. Norris was hit in the head by Falcons running back Nate Carter's knee. The official result on his injury is yet to be confirmed. Norris was subsequently waived by the Lions on August 26 as part of final roster cuts.

=== BC Lions ===
On May 18, 2026, Norris signed as a defensive back with the BC Lions of the Canadian Football League (CFL). On May 31, 2026, Norris was released by Lions, during their final cuts before the start of the 2026 CFL season.
