= Del Rey, California =

Del Rey
- census-designated place
- Location in Fresno County and the state of California

- Location in the United States
- Coordinates: 36°39′33″N 119°35′37″W
- Country: United States
- State: California
- County: Fresno

Government
  - State Senator: Anna Caballero (D)
  - State Assembly: Joaquin Arambula (D)
  - U. S. Congress: Jim Costa (D)

Area
  - Total: 1.34 sq mi (3.46 km^{2})
  - Land: 1.34 sq mi (3.46 km^{2})
  - Water: 0 sq mi (0.00 km^{2}) 0%
- Elevation: 344 ft (105 m)

Population (2020)
  - Total: 1,358
  - Density: 1,017.5/sq mi (392.84/km^{2})
- Time zone: UTC-8 (PST)
  - Summer (DST): UTC-7 (PDT)
- ZIP code: 93616
- Area code: 559
- FIPS code: 06-18674
- GNIS feature IDs: 1658399, 2408651

Del Rey (Spanish for "of the King") is a census-designated place (CDP) in Fresno County, California, United States. The population was 1,358 at the 2020 census, down from 1,639 at the 2010 census. Del Rey is located 3.5 miles (5.6 km) south-southwest of Sanger, at an elevation of 344 (105 m).

== Geography ==
According to the United States Census Bureau, the CDP has a total area of 1.3 square miles (3.4 km^{2}), all land.

== History ==
Originally called Clifton, the place was renamed by the railroad in 1898 to Del Rey, after the Rancho del Rey on which the station was located. Del Rey is a Spanish phrase meaning "of the king". A post office opened in 1885. The name Clifton honored Clift Wilkinson, town founder.

== Demographics ==
Historical population
Census	Pop.	Note	%±
1980	1,126		—
1990	1,150		2.1%
2000	950		−17.4%
2010	1,639		72.5%
2020	1,358		−17.1%
U.S. Decennial Census; 1860–1870 1880-1890; 1900 1910 1920; 1930 1940 1950; 1960 1970 1980; 1990 2000 2010; 2020

Del Rey first appeared as a census designated place in the 1980 U.S. census.

=== Racial and ethnic composition ===
Del Rey CDP, California – Racial and ethnic composition Note: the US Census treats Hispanic/Latino as an ethnic category. This table excludes Latinos from the racial categories and assigns them to a separate category. Hispanics/Latinos may be of any race.
Race / Ethnicity (NH = Non-Hispanic)	Pop 2000	Pop 2010	Pop 2020	% 2000	% 2010	% 2020
White alone (NH)	54	59	73	5.68%	3.60%	5.38%
Black or African American alone (NH)	0	0	12	0.00%	0.00%	0.88%
Native American or Alaska Native alone (NH)	0	4	2	0.00%	0.24%	0.15%
Asian alone (NH)	7	34	45	0.74%	2.07%	3.31%
Native Hawaiian or Pacific Islander alone (NH)	0	0	0	0.00%	0.00%	0.00%
Other race alone (NH)	0	0	2	0.00%	0.00%	0.15%
Mixed race or Multiracial (NH)	1	8	17	0.11%	0.49%	1.25%
Hispanic or Latino (any race)	888	1,534	1,207	93.47%	93.59%	88.88%
Total	950	1,639	1,358	100.00%	100.00%	100.00%

=== 2020 census ===
As of the 2020 census, Del Rey had a population of 1,358 and a population density of 1,017.2 inhabitants per square mile (392.7/km^{2}).

The age distribution was 356 people (26.2%) under the age of 18, 161 people (11.9%) aged 18 to 24, 386 people (28.4%) aged 25 to 44, 292 people (21.5%) aged 45 to 64, and 163 people (12.0%) who were 65 years of age or older. The median age was 31.7 years. For every 100 females, there were 105.4 males, and for every 100 females age 18 and over, there were 102.4 males age 18 and over.

There were 371 households, out of which 152 (41.0%) had children under the age of 18 living in them, 156 (42.0%) were married-couple households, 31 (8.4%) were cohabiting couple households, 108 (29.1%) had a female householder with no partner present, and 76 (20.5%) had a male householder with no partner present. 65 households (17.5%) were one person, and 25 (6.7%) were one person aged 65 or older. The average household size was 3.6. There were 282 families (76.0% of all households).

There were 381 housing units at an average density of 285.4 units per square mile (110.2 units/km^{2}), of which 371 (97.4%) were occupied. Of these, 184 (49.6%) were owner-occupied, and 187 (50.4%) were occupied by renters. The vacancy rate was 2.6%; the homeowner vacancy rate was 2.1%, and the rental vacancy rate was 1.6%.

The census reported that 98.4% of the population lived in households, 1.6% lived in non-institutionalized group quarters, and no one was institutionalized. In addition, 0.0% of residents lived in urban areas while 100.0% lived in rural areas.

=== Income and poverty ===
In 2023, the US Census Bureau estimated that the median household income was $57,292, and the per capita income was $18,548. About 28.2% of families and 24.8% of the population were below the poverty line.

== Education ==
Del Rey is served by the Sanger Unified School District.
