= Scottsburgh =

Scottsburgh may refer to:

In South Africa

- Scottburgh, KwaZulu-Natal

In the United States

- Scottsburgh, California
- Scottsburgh, former name of Centerville, Fresno County, California
- Scottsburgh, former name of Scottsburg, Indiana
- Scottsburgh, former name of the hamlet Scottsburg, now part of Sparta, New York
