= Minkler, California =

Minkler
- census-designated place
- Location in Fresno County and the state of California

- Location in California
- Coordinates: 36°43′26″N 119°27′29″W
- Country: United States
- State: California
- County: Fresno

Area
  - Total: 5.856 sq mi (15.167 km^{2})
  - Land: 5.856 sq mi (15.167 km^{2})
  - Water: 0 sq mi (0 km^{2}) 0%
- Elevation: 397 ft (121 m)

Population (2020)
  - Total: 867
  - Density: 148/sq mi (57.2/km^{2})
- Time zone: UTC-8 (Pacific (PST))
  - Summer (DST): UTC-7 (PDT)
- GNIS feature IDs: 228804; 2583082

Minkler is a census-designated place in eastern Fresno County, California, United States. The place is located on Highway 180, 2.25 miles (3.6 km) east-southeast of Centerville and 7.6 miles north of Reedley at an elevation of 397 feet (121 m). It has a population of 867 people, as of the 2020 census. The town is named for Charles O. Minkler, a local farmer.

Minkler made headlines in February 2010 for a police shootout that took the lives of Fresno County Sheriff's Deputy Joel Whalenmair and Reedley Police Department officer Javier Bejar, as well as the shooter, Rick Liles.

== Demographics ==
Historical population
Census	Pop.	Note	%±
2010	1,003		—
2020	867		−13.6%
U.S. Decennial Census; 2010

Minkler first appeared as a census designated place in the 2010 U.S. census.

The 2020 United States census reported that Minkler had a population of 867. The population density was 148.1 inhabitants per square mile (57.2/km^{2}). The racial makeup of Minkler was 652 (75.2%) White, 0 (0.0%) African American, 12 (1.4%) Native American, 25 (2.9%) Asian, 1 (0.1%) Pacific Islander, 59 (6.8%) from other races, and 118 (13.6%) from two or more races. Hispanic or Latino of any race were 235 persons (27.1%).

The whole population lived in households. There were 336 households, out of which 82 (24.4%) had children under the age of 18 living in them, 186 (55.4%) were married-couple households, 27 (8.0%) were cohabiting couple households, 64 (19.0%) had a female householder with no partner present, and 59 (17.6%) had a male householder with no partner present. 87 households (25.9%) were one person, and 63 (18.8%) were one person aged 65 or older. The average household size was 2.58. There were 222 families (66.1% of all households).

The age distribution was 159 people (18.3%) under the age of 18, 63 people (7.3%) aged 18 to 24, 153 people (17.6%) aged 25 to 44, 268 people (30.9%) aged 45 to 64, and 224 people (25.8%) who were 65 years of age or older. The median age was 51.8 years. For every 100 females, there were 97.0 males.

There were 373 housing units at an average density of 63.7 units per square mile (24.6 units/km^{2}), of which 336 (90.1%) were occupied. Of these, 259 (77.1%) were owner-occupied, and 77 (22.9%) were occupied by renters.

== Education ==
Most of Minkler is served by the Sanger Unified School District; a portion is within the Kings Canyon Joint Unified School District.
