= Jalen Moreno-Cropper =

American football player (born 2001)

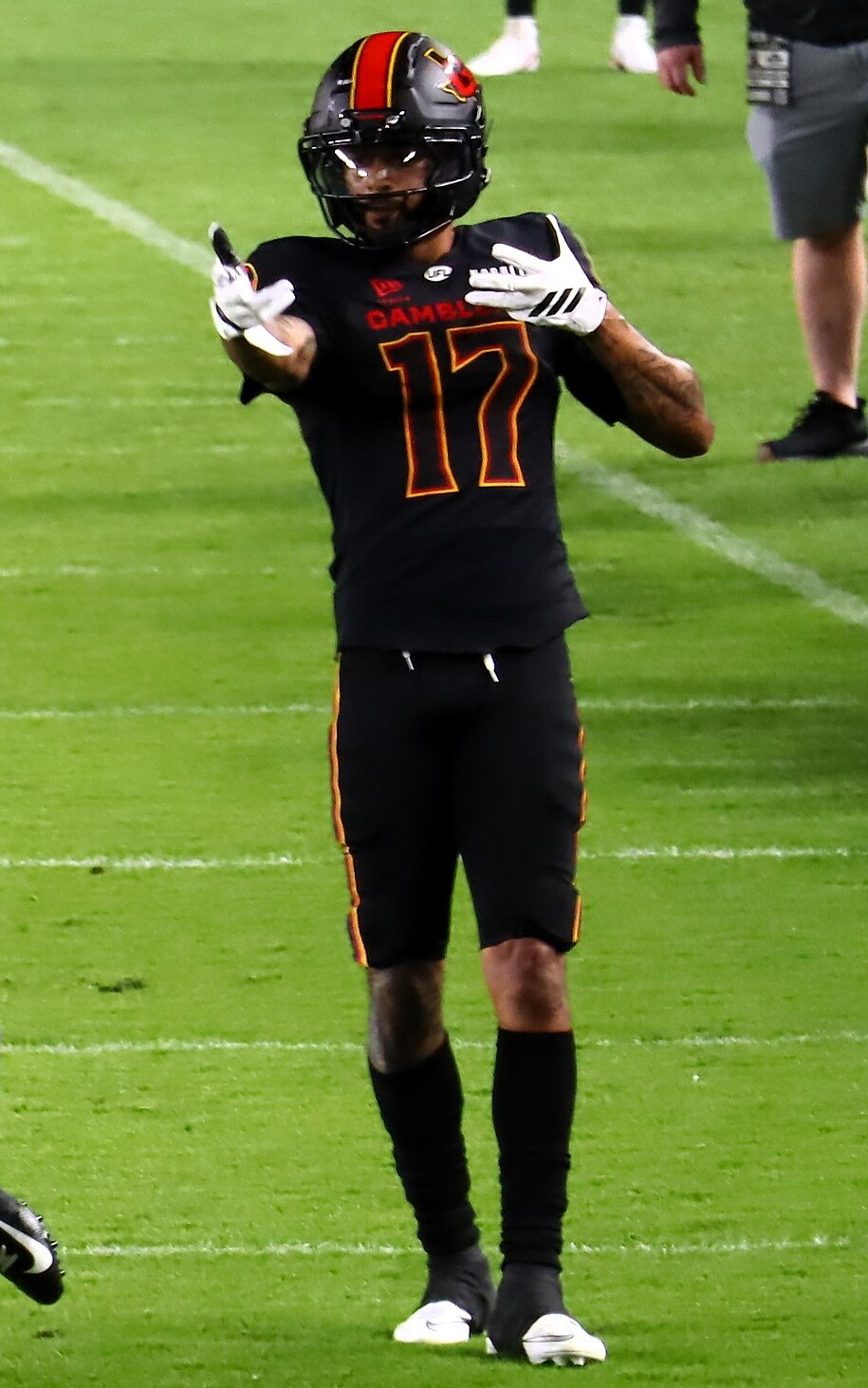
- Moreno-Cropper with the Houston Gamblers in 2026

No. 85 – New Orleans Saints
- Position: Wide receiver
- Roster status: Practice squad

Personal information
- Born: May 3, 2001 (age 25); Parlier, California, U.S.
- Listed height: 6 ft 0 in (1.83 m)
- Listed weight: 169 lb (77 kg)

Career information
- High school: Sanger (Sanger, California)
- College: Fresno State (2019–2022)
- NFL draft: 2023: undrafted

Career history
- Dallas Cowboys (2023–2025); Houston Gamblers (2026); New Orleans Saints (2026–present)

Awards and highlights
- First-team All-Mountain West (2022); Second-team All-Mountain West (2021)

Career NFL statistics as of 2025
- Games played: 4
- Stats at Pro Football Reference

Jalen Moreno-Cropper (born May 3, 2001) is an American professional football wide receiver for the New Orleans Saints of the National Football League (NFL). He played college football for the Fresno State Bulldogs.

== Early life ==
Moreno-Cropper grew up in Parlier, California and initially attended Sanger High School before transferring to Buchanan High School for his senior year. He was rated a four-star recruit and committed to play college football at nearby Fresno State over offers from Power 5 programs such as Utah, Nebraska, California, and Oregon.

== College career ==
Moreno-Cropper caught 15 passes for 196 yards and also rushed for 343 yards and three touchdowns during his freshman season at Fresno State. As a sophomore he led the Bulldogs with 37 receptions and 520 receiving yards and had five touchdown receptions. Moreno-Cropper was named second-team All-Mountain West Conference after catching 85 passes for 899 yards with 11 touchdowns during his junior season. He was named first-team All-Mountain West as a senior and had 84 receptions for 1,093 yards and five touchdowns.

== Professional career ==
Pre-draft measurables
Height	Weight	Arm length	Hand span	Wingspan	40-yard dash	10-yard split	20-yard split	20-yard shuttle	Three-cone drill	Vertical jump	Broad jump	Bench press
5 ft 11 1/8 in (1.81 m)	172 lb (78 kg)	30 1/8 in (0.77 m)	8 7/8 in (0.23 m)	6 ft 0 7/8 in (1.85 m)	4.40 s	1.55 s	2.54 s	4.27 s	7.06 s	32.0 in (0.81 m)	10 ft 1 in (3.07 m)	13 reps
All values from NFL Combine/Pro Day

=== Dallas Cowboys ===
Moreno-Cropper signed with the Dallas Cowboys as an undrafted free agent. He was waived on August 29, 2023 and re-signed to the practice squad. He signed a reserve/future contract with the team on January 15, 2024.

Moreno-Cropper was released during roster cuts on August 27, 2024 before re-signing with the team's practice squad the next day. Moreno-Cropper was elevated to the active roster for Dallas' Week 10 contest against the Philadelphia Eagles. He would play in 12 of 60 offensive snaps in the 34-6 defeat, and reverted to the practice squad following the game. Moreno-Cropper signed a reserve/future contract with the Cowboys on January 6, 2025.

On August 26, 2025, Moreno-Cropper was waived by the Cowboys as part of final roster cuts and was re-signed to the practice squad the next day. On October 11, he was signed to the teams's active roster. However, on October 14, Moreno-Cropper was waived by the Cowboys and re-signed to the practice squad.

=== Houston Gamblers ===
On February 11, 2026, Moreno-Cropper signed with the Houston Gamblers of the United Football League (UFL).

=== New Orleans Saints ===
On June 17, 2026, Moreno-Cropper signed with the New Orleans Saints. On August 30, Moreno-Cropper was released by the Saints as a part of final roster cuts; he was re–signed to the team's practice squad the following day.
