= Sanger Unified School District =

School district in California, United States

Location
- 1905 Seventh St. Sanger, California 93657 United States

District information
- Superintendent: Dennis Wiechmann

Other information
- Website: www.sanger.k12.ca.us

Sanger Unified School District is a public school district in Fresno County, California, United States. The district operates 20 schools, serving 11,360 students.

Sanger Unified was established on November 17, 1964, effective July 1, 1965. On that date, Sanger Union joined with Fairmont Union, Centerville Union, and Lone Star Union to create the Sanger Unified School District. SUSD annexed Del Rey Union the next year, on July 1, 1966.

Elliott W. Lindsay was the first superintendent in the district. Matthew Navo was the second superintendent in 2013 through 2018. Adela Madrigal Jones was the third superintendent in the district in 2018 through 2023. Dennis Wiechmann became the fourth superintendent in the district in July 2023.

== Boundary ==
The district includes almost all of the Sanger city limits, as well as Centerville, Del Rey, most of Minkler, and portions of Clovis, Fresno, and Sunnyside.

== Schools ==
=== High School ===
- Sanger High School
- Sanger West High School

=== Middle School ===
- Washington Academic Middle School (7-8)
- John F. Kennedy Middle School (7-8)

=== K-8 ===
- Centerville Dual Language Academy
- Fairmont School

=== Elementary School ===
- Del Rey Elementary
- Jackson Elementary
- Jefferson Elementary
- John Walsh Elementary
- Lincoln Elementary
- Lone Star Elementary
- Madison Elementary
- Reagan Elementary
- Sequoia Elementary
- Wilson Elementary

=== Charter Schools ===
- Quail Lake Environmental Charter School
- Sanger Academy Charter School

=== Alternative Education ===
- Community Day School (Grade 7-12)
- Kings River High School (Continuation High School)

=== Adult Education ===
- Sanger Adult School
