= Earl J. Atkisson =

American soldier

Earl James Atkisson
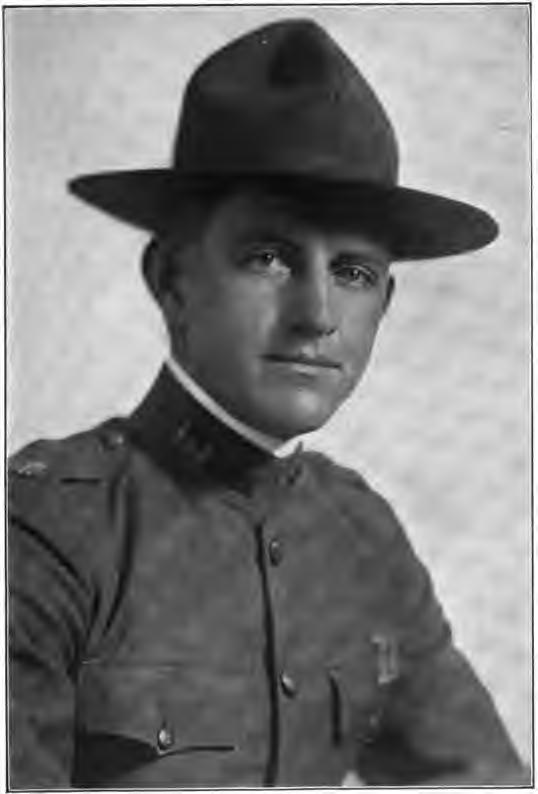
- Earl J. Atkisson
- Born: August 12, 1886; Broken Bow, Nebraska
- Died: September 18, 1941 (aged 55); Sanger, California
- Burial place: Sanger Cemetery
- Military career
- Allegiance: United States of America
- Branch: United States Army
- Service years: 1908–1926
- Rank: Colonel
- Commands: 1st Gas Regiment
- Conflicts: World War I: Aisne-Marne Offensive; Battle of Saint-Mihiel; Meuse-Argonne Offensive
- Awards: Distinguished Service Medal; Distinguished Service Order (UK); Purple Heart; Lifesaving Medal

Earl James Atkisson (August 12, 1886 – September 18, 1941) was Colonel of the United States Army's 1st Gas Regiment in World War I.

== Early career ==
Earl James Atkisson was born in Broken Bow, Nebraska, but his family moved to Fresno County, California and he graduated from high school in Fowler. He was appointed to the United States Military Academy in 1904. He graduated seventh in his class in 1908, and was commissioned a second lieutenant in the Corps of Engineers.

Atkisson served two years at Fort Leavenworth, followed by six at the Army's Engineering school at Washington Barracks, less one year he spent earning his M.E. degree at Cornell University, which he received in 1911. While there, he was promoted to first lieutenant. He was next assigned as a captain to be superintendent of the Gatun Locks of the Panama Canal, where he was serving when World War I broke out.

== World War I ==
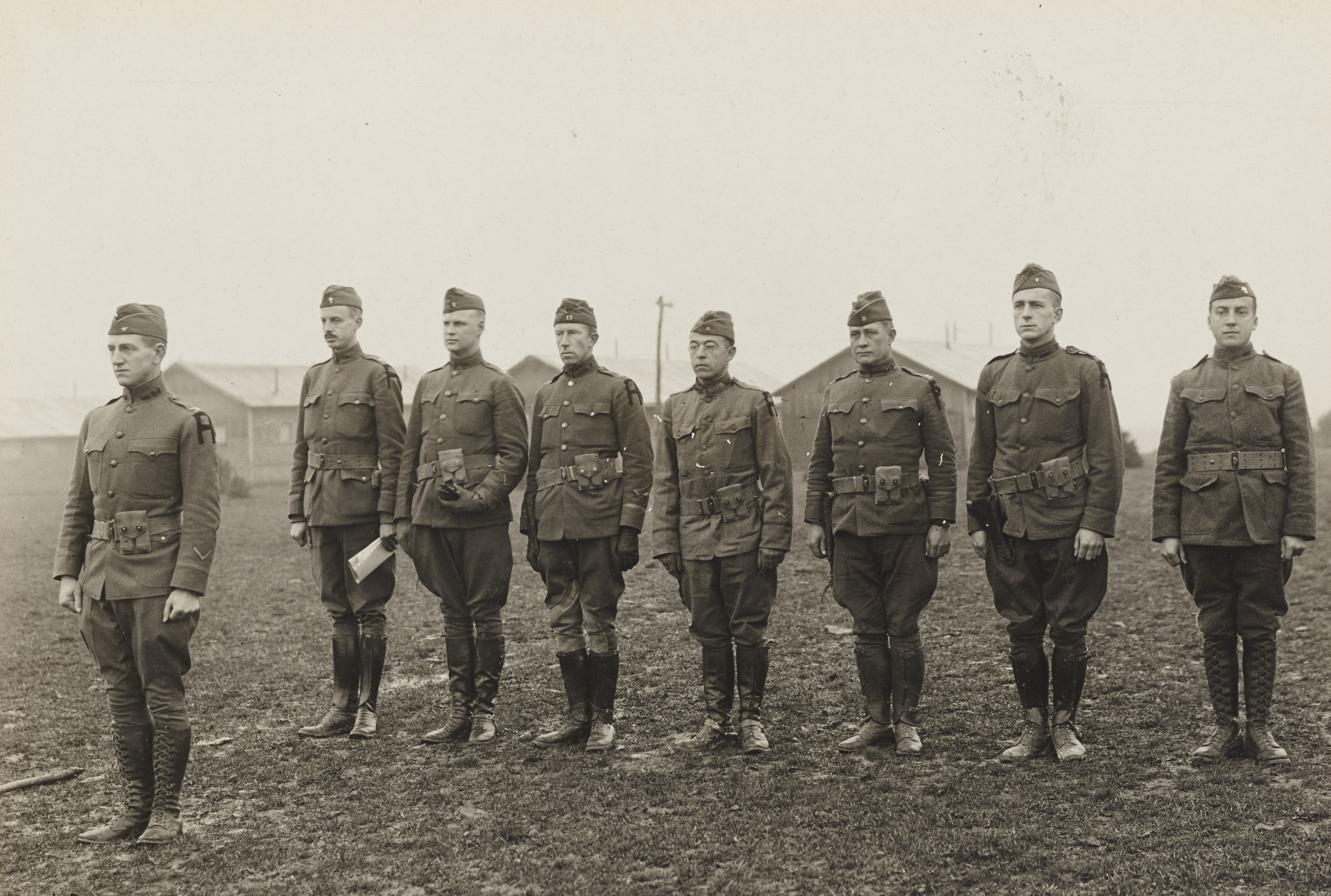
Atkisson (front) as colonel with the staff of the 1st Gas Regiment, France, December 1918.

In July 1917, Atkisson was made a major in the National Army, and placed in command of the 30th Engineers, which became the 1st Gas Regiment. This regiment arrived in France on March 10, 1918, and eventually participated in the Aisne-Marne, St. Mihel, and Meuse-Argonne operations. In May 1918 he was made commandant of the Gas Service Experimental Field and Gas Defense School at Hanlon Field near Chaumont, France. Beginning in January 1919, having risen to the rank of colonel, he served in various capacities with the Army of Occupation. For his service in the war, Atkisson was awarded the Distinguished Service Medal, the Purple Heart, and the Distinguished Service Order of Great Britain. The citation for his Army DSM reads:

The President of the United States of America, authorized by Act of Congress, July 9, 1918, takes pleasure in presenting the Army Distinguished Service Medal to Colonel (Corps of Engineers) Earl James Atkisson, United States Army, for exceptionally meritorious and distinguished services to the Government of the United States, in a duty of great responsibility during World War I. Colonel Atkisson organized and trained the 1st Gas Regiment in a type of warfare new to the American Army and directed the operations of that regiment with marked distinction during the St. Mihiel and Argonne-Meuse offensives of the First American Army.

== Later career ==
Returning to the United States in September 1919, Atkisson returned to his Regular Army rank of major, and transferred to the fledgling Chemical Warfare Service. In 1920, he became commander of Edgewood Arsenal, the Chemical Warfare Service's large manufacturing establishment near Baltimore, Maryland, for three years. While there, he assisted in rescuing two officers from drowning, for which he was awarded the Lifesaving Medal. He then served as Assistant Military Attaché at the American embassy in London from 1923 to 1925. He then served as the Chemical Officer for the Ninth Corps Area at the Presidio of San Francisco, until his retirement for disability in March 1926. He was given his World War I rank of colonel by Act of Congress in June 1930.

Upon retirement, Atkisson returned to Sanger, where he managed his father's department store company until his death in September 1941. He is buried in the Sanger Cemetery.

== Portrayals ==
Christopher Alexander McCowan aka Alexander Christof Grimaldi played Earl J. Atkisson in "A Man Comes To Fowler" by the Cornerstone Theater Company which is based in Los Angeles. The play took place in Fowler, California from August 11–13, 2011
