= Da'Marcus Johnson =

American football player (born 2000)

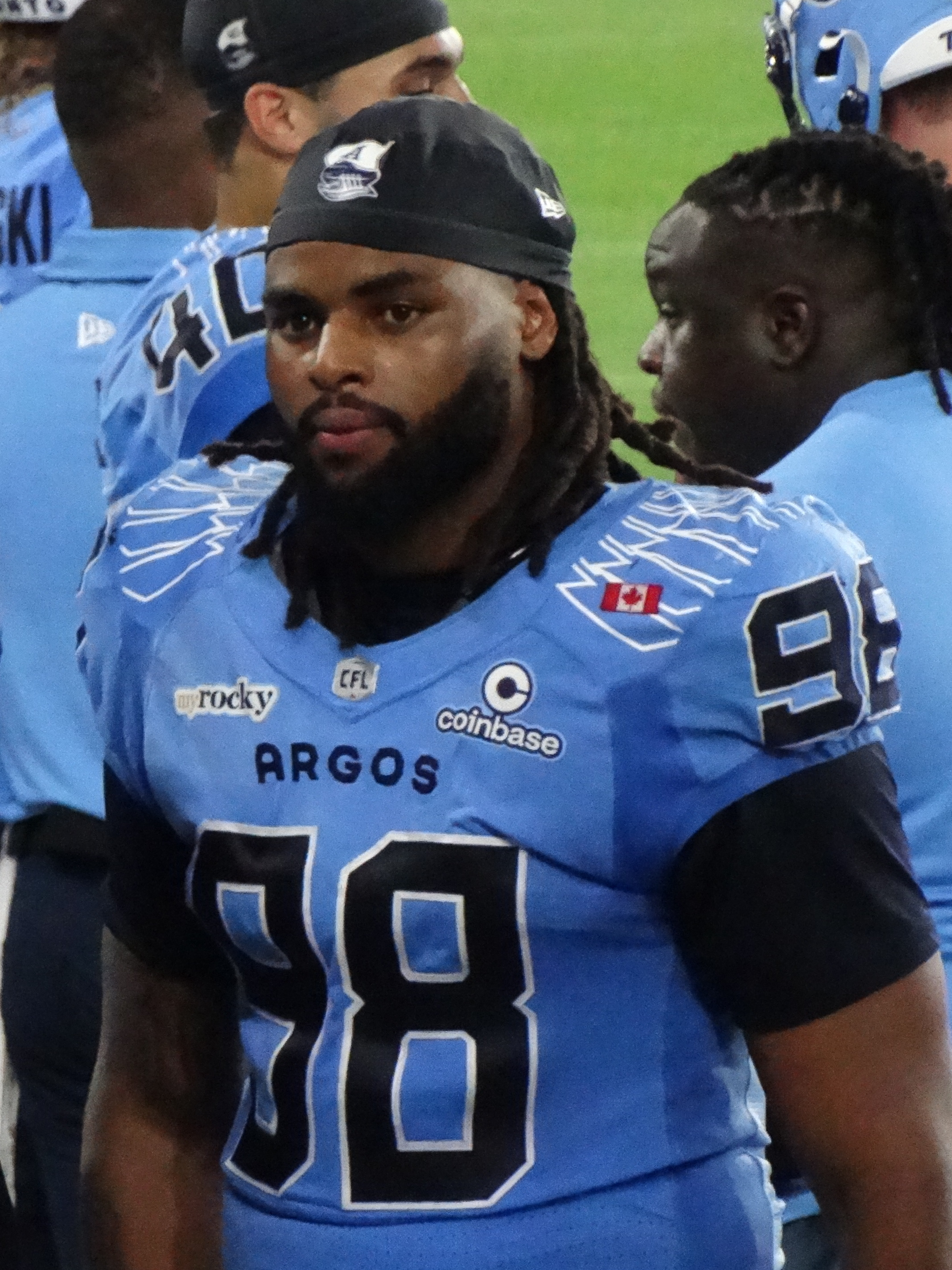
- Johnson with the Toronto Argonauts in 2026

No. 98 – Toronto Argonauts
- Position: Defensive lineman
- Roster status: Active
- CFL status: American

Personal information
- Born: December 24, 2000 (age 25)
- Listed height: 6 ft 4 in (1.93 m)
- Listed weight: 255 lb (116 kg)

Career information
- High school: Luther Burbank (Sacramento, California)
- College: American River College (2019); Fresno State (2020–2022); Eastern Washington (2023)

Career history
- 2025–present: Toronto Argonauts
- Stats at CFL.ca

Da'Marcus Johnson (born December 24, 2000) is an American professional football defensive lineman for the Toronto Argonauts of the Canadian Football League (CFL). Johnson previously played college football for the American River Beavers, Eastern Washington Eagles and Fresno State Bulldogs.

== College career ==
Johnson played college football for American River College in 2019, Fresno State from 2020 to 2022 and Eastern Washington in 2023. He spent his first year playing for American River College, playing ten games and finished with 27 tackles, 0.5 sack, two knockdowns, and one forced fumble.

Johnson transferred to Fresno State and appeared in 29 games, logging 21 tackles, including 3.5 tackles for loss, two sacks, and one forced fumble. For his final year of eligibility he transferred to Eastern Washington, playing in 11 games and had 52 tackles, including nine tackles for loss, 5.5 sacks, one pass deflection, two fumble recoveries and one blocked kick.

== Professional career ==
Pre-draft measurables
Height	Weight
6 ft 3 5/8 in (1.92 m)	255 lb (116 kg)
Values from Pro Day

On January 1, 2025, Johnson signed with the Toronto Argonauts of the CFL. He made his professional debut on June 20 against the Saskatchewan Roughriders, recording one tackle. The following week, Johnson made his first start for the Argonauts, against the Ottawa Redblacks where he had two tackles. He played in 16 regular season games in 2025 where he had 12 defensive tackles, six special teams tackles, and one sack.
