= Lone Star Elementary School =

Public elementary school in Fresno, California, United States

Location
- 2617 S. Fowler Avenue, Fresno, California 93725; United States
- Coordinates: 36.6985612°N 119.6818047°W

Information
- Type: Public
- School district: Sanger Unified School District
- Grades: K-6
- Website: lonestar.sanger.k12.ca.us

Lone Star Elementary School (located at 2617 S. Fowler Avenue, Fresno, California 93725, between Jensen Ave. and North Ave.) is an American primary school, part of the Sanger Unified School District, with Grades K-6 (formerly K-8). The school is attended by 388 students.

== Influence on Outsiders film ==
In 1980, Lone Star Elementary School librarian Jo Ellen Misakian wrote to director Francis Ford Coppola, saying that the students and faculty of her school wanted him to make a movie from the book The Outsiders, by S. E. Hinton. Unsure of Coppola's address, Misakian sent the letter, along with a copy of the book and a petition signed by the students, to the New York offices of Paramount Pictures, the studio that had produced two of Coppola's films, The Godfather and its sequel. The letter was received and investigated by Coppola, and two years later, he began filming The Outsiders in Tulsa, Oklahoma.

== Other achievements ==
More recently, Lone Star Elementary School "was selected as a 2006 California Distinguished School." In 2008, Lone Star Elementary was recognized by The Bonner Center for Character Education at California State University, with a Virtues and Character Recognition Award.

== Notable alumni ==
- LuckyDesigns, graphic designer and video editor, real name Lucky Nunthatee
