= The Outsiders (film) =

1983 film by Francis Ford Coppola

- Theatrical release poster
- Directed by: Francis Coppola
- Screenplay by: Kathleen Knutsen Rowell
- Based on: The Outsiders by S. E. Hinton
- Produced by: Fred Roos; Gray Frederickson
- Starring: C. Thomas Howell; Matt Dillon; Ralph Macchio; Patrick Swayze; Rob Lowe; Diane Lane; Emilio Estevez; Tom Cruise; Leif Garrett
- Cinematography: Stephen H. Burum
- Edited by: Anne Goursaud
- Music by: Carmine Coppola
- Production company: Zoetrope Studios
- Distributed by: Warner Bros.
- Release date: March 25, 1983
- Running time: 91 minutes (theatrical version); 114 minutes (The Complete Novel)
- Country: United States
- Language: English
- Budget: $10 million
- Box office: $25.8 million

The Outsiders is a 1983 American coming-of-age crime drama film directed by Francis Ford Coppola (billed as Francis Coppola), based on the 1967 novel by S. E. Hinton. Jo Ellen Misakian, a librarian at Lone Star Elementary School in Fresno, California, and her students were responsible for inspiring Coppola to make the film.

The film is notable for its ensemble cast including C. Thomas Howell (who garnered a Young Artist Award), Matt Dillon, Ralph Macchio, Patrick Swayze, Rob Lowe (in his feature film debut), Diane Lane, Emilio Estevez, Tom Cruise, and Leif Garrett. In addition, Dillon starred in two more films based on Hinton novels: Tex (1982), with Estevez; and Coppola's Rumble Fish (1983), with Lane. Estevez also wrote and starred in the Hinton adaptation That Was Then... This Is Now (1985).

The Outsiders was released by Warner Bros. in the United States on March 25, 1983. The film received mostly positive reviews from critics, particularly for its performances, and grossed $25.8 million on a $10 million budget. Over the years, the film has earned a cult following and has spawned a 1990 sequel television series and a successful 2023 stage musical.

== Plot ==
In 1965 Tulsa, Oklahoma, Darrel (Darry) Curtis is left to raise his younger brothers, Sodapop and Ponyboy, after the deaths of their parents in a car crash eight months earlier. Youth subculture in the city is centered around two European-American gangs: the affluent Socs and the poorer Greasers. One day, Ponyboy is jumped by the Socs after heading home from the movie theater, but is rescued by Darry and Sodapop, along with several of their friends. Darry chastises Ponyboy for walking home alone, and Sodapop later tells him to not take it personally when Darry yells at him and that Darry really loves him, but Ponyboy dismisses this idea. The next day, Ponyboy and his friends Johnny Cade and Dallas Winston go to a movie at the local drive-in theater. There, Dallas unsuccessfully flirts with Soc Cherry Valance and leaves in a rage after she insults him by splashing him with Coca-Cola. Cherry invites Ponyboy and Johnny to sit with her and her friend Marcia, later joined by the gang's greaser friend Two-Bit Matthews. After the movie, the Socs' boyfriends, Bob Sheldon and Randy Anderson, take umbrage and confront them, prompting Two-Bit to pull his switchblade, so the girls leave with the Soc guys to avoid escalation.

Ponyboy and Johnny walk to an abandoned lot to help Johnny avoid his parents' bickering and domestic violence. He confesses the hopelessness of his life and considers suicide. Ponyboy falls asleep, and Johnny wakes him a few hours later. Ponyboy rushes home, where Darry confronts him and slaps him. Ponyboy runs off to a local park with Johnny, where Bob, Randy, and three other Socs attack them. Johnny is beaten, and when Ponyboy is almost drowned in the park's fountain, Johnny fatally stabs Bob in self-defense. Ponyboy and Johnny find Dallas, who gives them money for food and a loaded firearm. They flee to Windrixville after hopping on a train and hide in an abandoned church, where they read Gone with the Wind aloud to pass the time, and Ponyboy recites "Nothing Gold Can Stay" to Johnny. Dallas visits, taking them to get a meal at Dairy Queen, saying that the rivalry between the Greasers and Socs has escalated due to Bob’s murder. He brings a note from Sodapop that urges Ponyboy to come home, as Cherry is willing to testify on their behalf. Johnny favors turning themselves in, but Dallas disagrees.

Returning to the church, they discover that it is on fire with children trapped inside. Believing they may have caused the fire by being careless with their cigarettes, Ponyboy and Johnny rush inside to help. They rescue the children but suffer injuries. Johnny breaks his back when part of the structure collapses on him but he is rescued by Dallas. Ponyboy reunites with his brothers in the hospital and returns home. Their heroic deed makes the front page of the local paper. The next morning, Ponyboy falls ill and Two-Bit volunteers to care for him. Two-Bit and Ponyboy hitchhike towards the hospital, but duck into the Dairy Queen upon seeing Socs driving nearby. One of the Socs, Randy, peacefully talks to Ponyboy about an upcoming rumble to settle the Greaser–Soc rivalry. Ponyboy and Two-Bit visit Johnny and Dallas in the hospital. Ponyboy asks Two-Bit to buy another copy of Gone with the Wind at the hospital gift shop. Johnny's mother comes, but he refuses her visit. She takes out her ire on Ponyboy and Two-Bit, who decry her as a bad mother.

Dallas encourages them to win the rumble for Johnny, and they do. Dallas then drives an injured Ponyboy to the hospital to see Johnny. Dallas tells him about the Greasers' victory, but Johnny is dismissive and dies after telling Ponyboy to "stay gold". A distraught Dallas robs a store, is pursued by the police, and he commits suicide by cop. In court, the judge exonerates Ponyboy for Bob's death as self-defense and places him in Darry's custody. Cherry sees Ponyboy and gives him a look of encouragement, but walks away in order to maintain her reputation. Ponyboy's English teacher offers him a passing grade if he writes a quality essay, but Ponyboy is uninspired. Darry and Ponyboy get into a fight about the essay, causing Sodapop to run out of the house. The brothers later meet up in the park, with Sodapop pleading to Ponyboy and Darry to try to understand each other better as their fighting is tearing the family apart, and Darry and Ponyboy reconcile. While trying to write the essay, Ponyboy finds a letter from Johnny explaining how saving the children was worth him sacrificing his own life and advising Ponyboy to keep seeing the goodness in the world. Johnny's letter inspires Ponyboy's essay, which begins, "When I stepped out into the bright sunlight from the darkness of the movie house, I had only two things on my mind: Paul Newman and a ride home", the book's opening line and the opening line of the movie’s narration.

== Cast ==
- C. Thomas Howell as Ponyboy Curtis
- Ralph Macchio as Johnny Cade
- Matt Dillon as Dallas "Dally" Winston
- Patrick Swayze as Darrel "Darry" Curtis
- Rob Lowe as Sodapop "Soda" Curtis
- Emilio Estevez as Keith "Two-Bit" Mathews
- Tom Cruise as Steve Randle
- Glenn Withrow as Tim Shepard
- Diane Lane as Sherrie "Cherry" Valance
- Leif Garrett as Bob Sheldon
- Darren Dalton as Randy Anderson
- Michelle Meyrink as Marcia
- Gailard Sartain as Jerry
- Tom Waits as Buck Merrill
- William Smith as the store clerk

Sofia Coppola (credited as Domino), daughter of the film's director, plays the child asking the greasers for 15 cents, and S. E. Hinton plays Dallas's nurse. Additionally, Michael Peter Balzary (bassist "Flea" from Red Hot Chili Peppers), and Cam Neely (future NHL player and member of the Hockey Hall of Fame) had uncredited appearances as rival gang members during the rumble scene.

== Production ==
=== Development ===
Francis Ford Coppola had not intended to make a film about teen angst until Jo Ellen Misakian, a school librarian from Lone Star Elementary School in Fresno, California, wrote to Coppola on behalf of her seventh and eighth grade students about adapting The Outsiders.

"We are all so impressed with the book, The Outsiders by SE Hinton, that a petition has been circulated asking that it be made into a movie. We have chosen you to send it to."

Approximately 15 pages of children's signatures were attached to the letter written in different colors. Moved by the letter, Coppola read the book and was impressed by the relationships between the greaser kids. It brought back memories of when he had been a drama counselor working with children at a summer camp in his youth.

=== Casting ===
The casting process led to debut and star-making performances of actors in the 1980s: Timothy Hutton, Sean Penn, Mickey Rourke, Robert Downey Jr., Anthony Michael Hall, Scott Baio, and Dennis Quaid also auditioned for roles but were not cast. Producer Fred Roos, a frequent collaborator with Coppola, was partially responsible for the film's casting. In particular, he scouted Patrick Swayze based on his performance in the roller skating movie Skatetown, U.S.A. (1979). Val Kilmer was approached for a role in the film, but he turned it down as he was prepping for a Broadway play (The Slab Boys).

Macchio stated that during auditions, Coppola "wanted everybody to read for a different role". He said that Coppola had all of the actors "in one room watching each other audition...It's brutal because you're becoming self-conscious of any choices because you're watching reactions based on other actors and watching the filmmakers and how they respond because you're all trying to get the job. For Francis, it was about mixing and matching the ensemble, saying 'Dennis Quaid, you read this, and Rob Lowe, you read that.'" As a New Yorker who did not know any of the other actors auditioning, Macchio also stated that he felt like an outsider during the process. Lowe also said that Cruise went "ballistic" over sharing a room with him during the auditions. He accidentally struck him in the face during rehearsals.

=== Filming ===
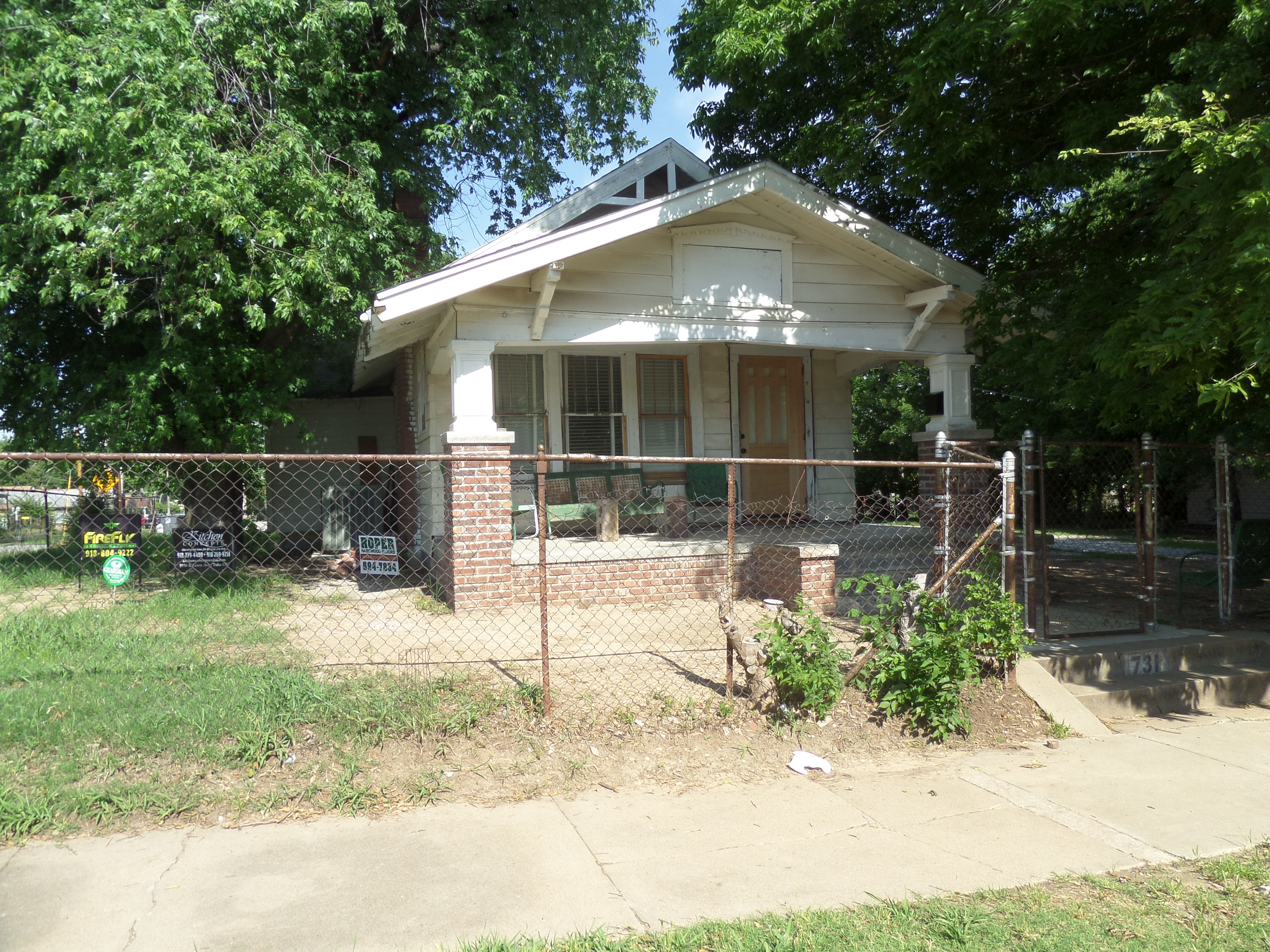
The Outsiders House Museum, used for filming in the movie, located at 731 Curtis Brothers Lane in Tulsa, Oklahoma, now showcases props from the film.

The film was shot on location in Tulsa, Oklahoma. Filming took place from March 29 to May 15, 1982. A newspaper used to show a story about the three greasers saving the kids in The Outsiders includes a real story from 1982 regarding the death of a man hit by a train in Boston. Coppola's craving for realism almost led to disaster during the church-burning scene. He pressed for "more fire", and the small, controlled blaze accidentally triggered a much larger, uncontrolled fire, which a downpour doused.

The original length of the film was 133 minutes. Warner Bros. felt that the film was a mistake and was too long. As a result, Coppola cut it down to 91 minutes for the theatrical release.

The pranks that went on during the filming have become legendary, initiated mainly by Matt Dillon, Rob Lowe, Tom Cruise, and Patrick Swayze. The targets were often C. Thomas Howell and Diane Lane. Ralph Macchio was not involved because he was so focused on getting his role right. The author of the original novel, S. E. Hinton, was involved during the filming as she and Coppola wrote the screenplay together; she appears as a nurse during a hospital scene in the film. She also later stated that she served as an informal "den mother" to many of the actors, as she was "close to all of them".

== The Outsiders (Original Motion Picture Soundtrack) ==
All music is composed by and performed by Carmine Coppola, except “Stay Gold” lyrics and music by Stevie Wonder and where noted.

No.	Title	Writer(s)	Performer(s)	Length
1.	"Stay Gold"	Stevie Wonder	Stevie Wonder, Carmine Coppola
2.	"Fate Theme"
3.	"Country Suite"
4.	"Cherry Says Goodbye"
5.	"Incidental Music 1"
6.	"Fight in the Park"
7.	"Bob is Dead"
8.	"Deserted Church Suite"
9.	"Sunrise"
10.	"Fire at the Church"
11.	"Incidental Music 2"
12.	"Rumble Variation / Dallas’ Death"
13.	"Brothers Together"
14.	"Rumble"
15.	"Stay Gold (alternate)"	Stevie Wonder	Stevie Wonder
16.	"The Outside In"		Bill Hughes
17.	"Stay Gold"	Stevie Wonder	Bill Hughes

== Reception ==
=== Box office ===
In the United States and Canada, the film grossed $5.1 million from 829 theaters on its opening weekend, ranking second behind Spring Break. The Outsiders grossed $25.8 million worldwide.

=== Critical response ===
Review aggregator Rotten Tomatoes has a rating of 71% based on 52 reviews, with an average score of 6.3/10. The site's consensus reads, "The cracks continue to show in Coppola's directorial style, but The Outsiders remains a blustery, weird, and fun adaptation of the classic novel." Roger Ebert rated the film two and a half out of four stars, citing problems with Coppola's vision, "the characters wind up like pictures, framed and hanging on the screen." Metacritic assigned the film a score of 45 out of 100, based on 18 critics, indicating "mixed or average reviews".

The film's casting directors, Janet Hirshenson and Jane Jenkins, wrote in a 2007 book that the film's realistic portrayal of poor teenagers "created a new kind of filmmaking, especially about teenagers — a more naturalistic look at how young people talk, act, and experience the world. This movie was one of the few Hollywood offerings to deal realistically with kids from the wrong side of the tracks, and to portray honestly children whose parents had abused, neglected, or otherwise failed them."

Stéphane Delorme, in his book on Coppola, wrote: "The Outsiders is a wonder. And wonder is also the subject of the film. 'Stay Gold', says the song over the title credits. [...] The artificiality of the rural setting, which is as fake as in The Night of the Hunter, places us in the distant, mythical past. It takes only dye to turn these blond heads into golden heads, and thus to go from nostalgia for one's youth in the 1960s to a general regret for a golden age."

=== Accolades ===
The Outsiders was nominated for four Young Artist Awards, given annually since 1978 by the Young Artist Foundation. C. Thomas Howell won "Best Young Motion Picture Actor in a Feature Film". Diane Lane was nominated for "Best Young Supporting Actress in a Motion Picture". The film was nominated for "Best Family Feature Motion Picture". Francis Ford Coppola was nominated for the Golden Prize at the 13th Moscow International Film Festival.

== Aftermath and legacy ==
=== "The Complete Novel" re-release ===
On September 20, 2005, Coppola re-released the film on DVD as a two-disc set called The Outsiders: The Complete Novel, including 22 minutes of additional footage and an updated soundtrack. Coppola re-inserted some deleted scenes to make the film more faithful to the book. This brought it up to a 114-minute running time. At the beginning of the film, he added scenes where Ponyboy gets stalked and jumped, the gang talks about going to the movies, Sodapop and Ponyboy talk in their room, and Dallas, Ponyboy, and Johnny bum around before going to the movies. At the end, Coppola added the scenes taking place in court, Mr. Syme talking to Ponyboy, Sodapop, and Darry in the park.

Coppola's father, Carmine Coppola, had written a soaring, romantic score for the original release, which at the time Coppola felt may have been the wrong choice, but he was not prepared to say that to him. By the time he came to recut the film for the "Complete Novel" re-release, his father had died, which allowed Coppola the opportunity to balance Carmine Coppola's music with music popular in the 1960s as well as new music composed by Michael Seifert and Dave Padrutt.

The film was re-rated by the MPAA as PG-13 for "violence, teen drinking and smoking, and some sexual references".

Disc 2 of the DVD includes some unique features, featuring behind-the-scenes interviews with the cast and crew, readings from the novel, additional deleted scenes, the original theatrical trailer, and an NBC News Today segment from 1983 talking about how The Outsiders has inspired teenagers across the world.

The director also removed three scenes that were in the theatrical version to improve pacing. Those scenes were Ponyboy and Johnny looking at their reflections in the lake and talking about their hair, attempting to catch a rabbit, and playing poker. They can be found on the second disc as additional scenes, along with other deleted scenes that were filmed, but not put into the movie. In addition, Swayze, Macchio, Lane, and Howell gathered at Coppola's estate to watch the re-release, and their commentary is included on the DVD. Dillon and Lowe provided separate commentary.

A Blu-ray edition of The Outsiders: The Complete Novel was released in Region A on June 3, 2014.

A manufacture-on-demand Ultra HD Blu-ray containing both versions of The Outsiders including The Complete Novel, was released through Studio Distribution Services on November 9, 2021.

=== Sequel TV series ===
A television series based on the characters of the novel and film aired in 1990. It consists of a different cast playing the same characters. It picks up right after the events of the film's ending and lasted only one season.

=== Stage musical adaptation ===
A stage musical based on both the novel and film held its world premiere at La Jolla Playhouse in February–March 2023. The production was directed by Danya Taymor from a libretto by Adam Rapp, with songs by Jamestown Revival and music supervision, arrangements, and orchestrations by Justin Levine. It was announced on August 21, 2023, that the show would begin previews on Broadway at the Bernard B. Jacobs Theatre on March 16. It officially opened on April 11. It received 12 nominations at the 77th Tony Awards, winning four including Best Musical.

=== The Outsiders House Museum and local preservations of the film locations ===
The Outsiders House Museum opened in Tulsa, Oklahoma, on August 9, 2019. In 2009, hip-hop artist Danny Boy O'Connor discovered the house that was used for the Curtis Brothers's home. Moving forward, O'Connor kept the thought of buying it, which he eventually did in 2016. O'Connor said he bought it sight unseen and that when he first went inside it was falling apart. With the help of friends, the Oklahoma Film and Music Office, the City Council, local businesses, and individuals who volunteered, the restoration started. After enough funds had been raised, the house went through extensive renovations to restore it and maintain its authenticity from the film.

In 2016, a GoFundMe was set up to raise additional funds, notable donors included Jack White, who donated $30,000, and Billy Idol. That same year, supporters organized film screenings featuring actor C. Thomas Howell, and the corner street signs were changed to "The Outsiders way" and "The Curtis Brothers Lane". The museum now contains a collection of The Outsiders memorabilia. In addition to Howell, other stars of the film including Rob Lowe, Ralph Macchio, and Matt Dillon visited the site between its restoration and opening. For his efforts on preserving a cultural landmark, O'Connor received a key to the city of Tulsa.

In 2022, in Sperry, Oklahoma, the group Upward Sperry restored the now non-operational DX gas station seen in the film. The group's president, Gary Coulson, said, "It's really growing. I almost hate to say, but it's almost like a cult following. They stream through here - what that does is get people here." With O'Connor they are planning to revitalize Outsiders nostalgia in Sperry.

On April 14, 2023, as part of a 40th anniversary celebration of the release of the film, the institution installed a plaque commemorating the film which was installed at the Admiral Twin drive-In where a scene was shot.

=== Set photography book The Outsiders ‘Rare and Unseen’ and The Outsiders on set ===
In October 2022, O'Connor with The Outsiders House Museum published the book The Outsiders 'Rare and Unseen', which contains 148 photos by David Burnett, who was the set's photographer. O'Connor said: "We originally got the first lot of photos and then [Burnett] said there may be more. They found the rougher photos, and for me, that's where the rubber meets the road because they [the actors]'re unpolished, their guard's down, they're not posing."

In May 2024, O'Connor with The Outsiders House Museum published the book The Outsiders on set, which contains 254 pages of photos by Nancy Moran a photographer who visited The Outsiders's set while they were shooting. O'Connor explained that when he discovered that this additional slew of photos existed, he approached Moran, whom he did not know, and to his surprise she let him have the negatives so that he could develop them.
