= Sanger High School (California) =

Public high school in California, United States

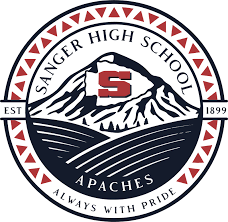

Location
- 1045 Bethel Ave; Sanger, California 93657; United States; 36.70161°N 119.57544°W

Information
- Type: Public
- Motto: "Always With Pride"
- Established: 1901
- School district: Sanger Unified School District
- Principal: Jon Tillotson
- Teaching staff: 109.54 (FTE)
- Grades: 9-12
- Enrollment: 2,443 (2023-2024)
- Student to teacher ratio: 22.30
- Color
- Mascot: Apache
- Rival: Sanger West High School
- Sports: CIF Central Section/ Div. II/ CMAC
- Website: https://sangerhigh.sanger.k12.ca.us/

Sanger High School is the four-year public high school serving Sanger, California and the rural surrounding community (defined as Sanger and the communities of Centerville, Fairmont, Lone Star, Del Rey, and Tivy Valley). The official address of the current campus is 1045 Bethel Avenue, Sanger, CA 93657. The school moved to the new campus and new address in 2001. The previous location at 1705 10th Street is now Washington Academic Middle School, but still houses the athletic facilities for Sanger High School, including a 10 lane track stadium and a separate football stadium, named after former Raiders coach, Tom Flores.

Based on the school's website, the current student population is 2,443 students (as of the 2023-24 school year), with 71% of these students identifying as Hispanic, 12% white, 13% Asian, 2% African American, and 2% other.

== Notable alumni ==
- Morice Norris (born 2000), NFL cornerback for the Detroit Lions
- Luis Ortiz (born 1995), baseball pitcher for the San Francisco Giants
- Tom Flores (born 1937) NFL player and coach (1972-1994), three time Super Bowl champion. The first Hispanic starting NFL quarterback, Sanger High's football stadium is named in honor of him.
