= Centerville, Fresno County, California =

Centerville
- census-designated place
- Location in California
- Coordinates: 36°44′02″N 119°29′52″W
- Country: United States
- State: California
- County: Fresno

Area
  - Total: 8.113 sq mi (21.012 km^{2})
  - Land: 8.113 sq mi (21.012 km^{2})
  - Water: 0 sq mi (0 km^{2}) 0%
- Elevation: 390 ft (120 m)

Population (2020)
  - Total: 378
  - Density: 46.6/sq mi (18.0/km^{2})
- Time zone: UTC-8 (Pacific (PST))
  - Summer (DST): UTC-7 (PDT)
- GNIS feature ID: 220830; 2582972

Centerville (formerly Kings River, King River, Scottsburgh, and Scottsburg) is a census-designated place in Fresno County, California, United States. It is located on the Atchison, Topeka and Santa Fe Railroad 16 miles (26 km) east of Fresno, at an elevation of 394 feet (120 m). At the 2020 census, it had a population of 378.

== History ==
Scottsburg was founded in 1854 in the low lands of the Kings River at Poole's Crossing. In 1858, W. W. Hills established Hills Ferry at Poole's Crossing. The ferry and the town were destroyed in the winter of 1861-1862. It was rebuilt on higher ground, but it was flooded again in 1867. The town was rebuilt on top of a bluff overlooking its prior location and renamed Centerville.

The Scottsburgh post office opened in 1856, closed in 1858, re-opened in 1859, and closed forever in 1864.

== Demographics ==
Historical population
Census	Pop.	Note	%±
2010	392		—
2020	378		−3.6%
U.S. Decennial Census; 2010

Centerville first as a census designated place in the 2010 U.S. census.

The 2020 United States census reported that Centerville had a population of 378. The population density was 46.6 inhabitants per square mile (18.0/km^{2}). The racial makeup of Centerville was 234 (61.9%) White, 3 (0.8%) African American, 0 (0.0%) Native American, 20 (5.3%) Asian, 0 (0.0%) Pacific Islander, 56 (14.8%) from other races, and 65 (17.2%) from two or more races. Hispanic or Latino of any race were 136 persons (36.0%).

The whole population lived in households. There were 133 households, out of which 41 (30.8%) had children under the age of 18 living in them, 66 (49.6%) were married-couple households, 9 (6.8%) were cohabiting couple households, 27 (20.3%) had a female householder with no partner present, and 31 (23.3%) had a male householder with no partner present. 25 households (18.8%) were one person, and 16 (12.0%) were one person aged 65 or older. The average household size was 2.84. There were 96 families (72.2% of all households).

The age distribution was 85 people (22.5%) under the age of 18, 20 people (5.3%) aged 18 to 24, 98 people (25.9%) aged 25 to 44, 98 people (25.9%) aged 45 to 64, and 77 people (20.4%) who were 65 years of age or older. The median age was 42.5 years. For every 100 females, there were 119.8 males.

There were 151 housing units at an average density of 18.6 units per square mile (7.2 units/km^{2}), of which 133 (88.1%) were occupied. Of these, 99 (74.4%) were owner-occupied, and 34 (25.6%) were occupied by renters.

== Education ==
Centerville is served by the Sanger Unified School District.
