= Sanger, California =

City in California, United States

- City
- City of Sanger
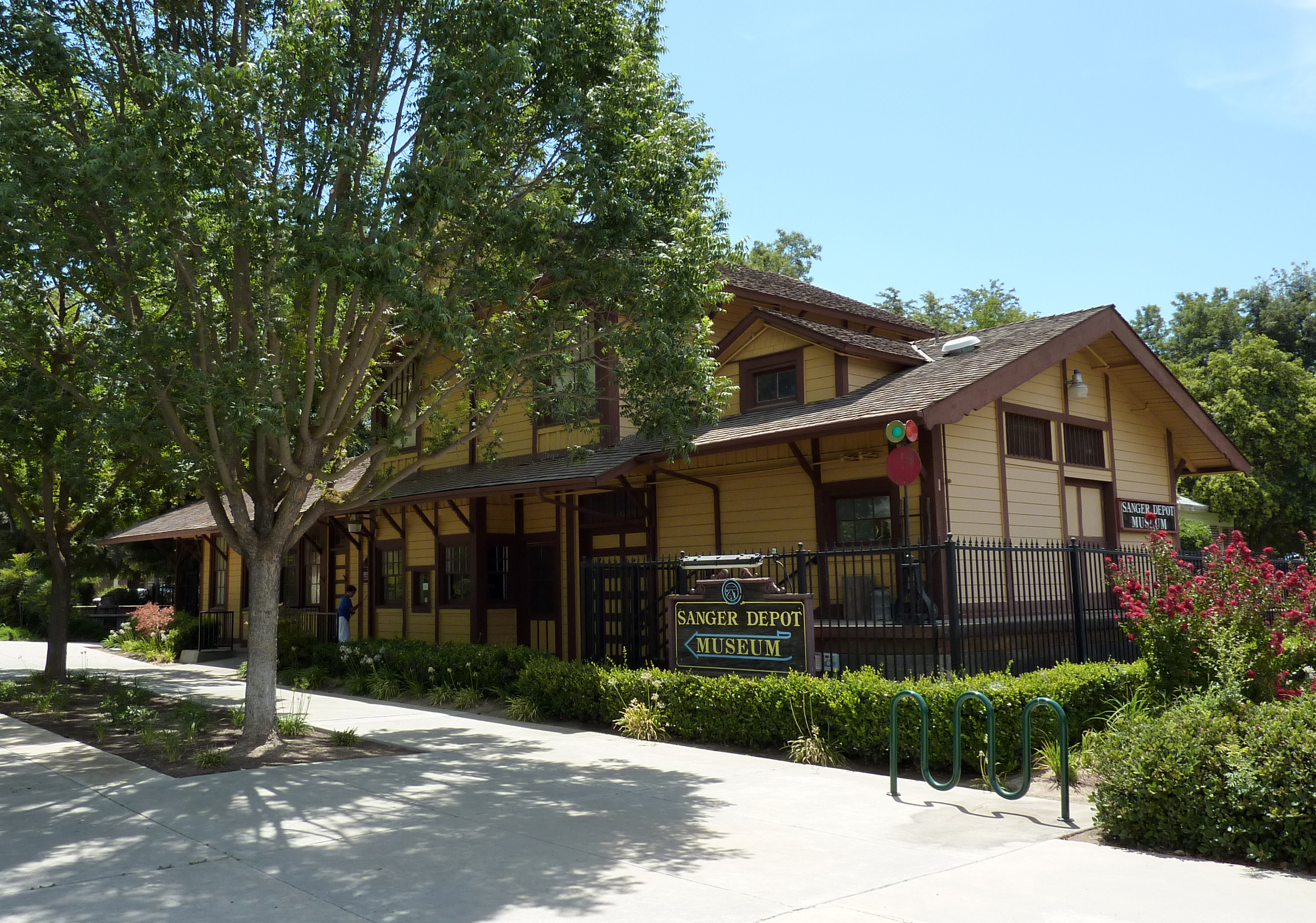
- The Sanger Depot Museum is located in the old Sanger Railroad Depot.

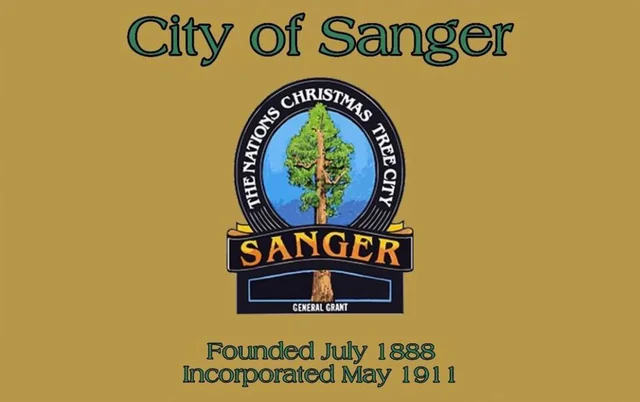
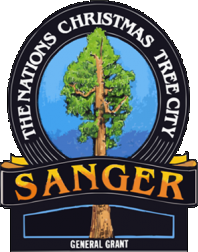
- Flag Seal
- Motto: "The Nation's Christmas Tree City"
- Interactive map of Sanger, California
- Location in the United States Sanger (the United States)
- Coordinates: 36°42′29″N 119°33′21″W
- Country: United States
- State: California
- County: Fresno
- Founded: 1888
- Incorporated: May 9, 1911

Government
  - Mayor: Frank Gonzalez
  - State Senator: Anna Caballero (D)
  - State Assembly: Joaquin Arambula (D)
  - U. S. Congress: Jim Costa (D)

Area
  - Total: 5.77 sq mi (14.94 km^{2})
  - Land: 5.77 sq mi (14.94 km^{2})
  - Water: 0 sq mi (0.00 km^{2}) 0%
- Elevation: 371 ft (113 m)

Population (2020)
  - Total: 26,617
  - Density: 4,614/sq mi (1,782/km^{2})
- Demonym: Sangerite
- Time zone: UTC-8 (PST)
  - Summer (DST): UTC-7 (PDT)
- ZIP code: 93657
- Area code: 559
- FIPS code: 06-67056
- GNIS feature IDs: 277596, 2411811
- Website: www.ci.sanger.ca.us

Sanger is a city in Fresno County, California, United States. The population was 26,617 at the 2020 census, up from 24,270 at the 2010 census. Sanger is located 13 miles (21 km) east-southeast of Fresno, at an elevation of 371 feet (113 m).

== Eponym ==
Sanger is named for Joseph Sanger Jr., an official of the Pacific Improvement Company, which was an affiliate of the Southern Pacific Railroad.

== Geography ==
According to the United States Census Bureau, the city has a total area of 5.8 square miles (15 km^{2}), all land.

== History ==
Yokuts inhabited the area.

In 1886, the Southern Pacific Company referred to the area as Sanger Junction, concerning plans to improve access to the fertile land. Later the area was known simply as Sanger. The name commemorates Joseph Sanger Jr., secretary-treasurer of the Railroad Yardmasters Association, who visited California in 1887.

In 1888, the Pacific Improvement Company owned and sold lots on the site and the first post office opened.

In 1890, the Kings River Lumber Company built a 62-mile long log flume to transport timber from the High Sierras to Sanger. That year more than 75 buildings were erected.

The Sanger Railroad Depot was built in 1887 next to the Southern Pacific Railroad line that connected Fresno to Porterville. It is a Southern Pacific standard design Two-Story Combination Depot No. 13 or 19. Sanger became a center for shipping grain, citrus and lumber from the nearby mountains. When the depot was retired, it was the oldest building in the city and was donated to the Sanger Historical Society which turned it into the Sanger Depot Museum in 1977.

By 1908, Sanger had a grammar school, a high school, seven churches, two newspapers, an opera house, a bank, grain warehouses, packing houses and two physicians.

The city incorporated in 1911.

In 1949, the city was designated the "Nation's Christmas Tree City" by the U.S. Postal Service.

== Demographics ==
Historical population
| Census | Pop. | Note | %± |
|---|---|---|---|
| 1920 | 2,578 | | — |
| 1930 | 2,967 | | 15.1% |
| 1940 | 4,017 | | 35.4% |
| 1950 | 6,400 | | 59.3% |
| 1960 | 8,072 | | 26.1% |
| 1970 | 10,088 | | 25.0% |
| 1980 | 12,542 | | 24.3% |
| 1990 | 16,839 | | 34.3% |
| 2000 | 18,931 | | 12.4% |
| 2010 | 24,270 | | 28.2% |
| 2020 | 26,617 | | 9.7% |
| 2024 (est.) | 26,649 | ▲ | 0.1% |
U.S. Decennial Census

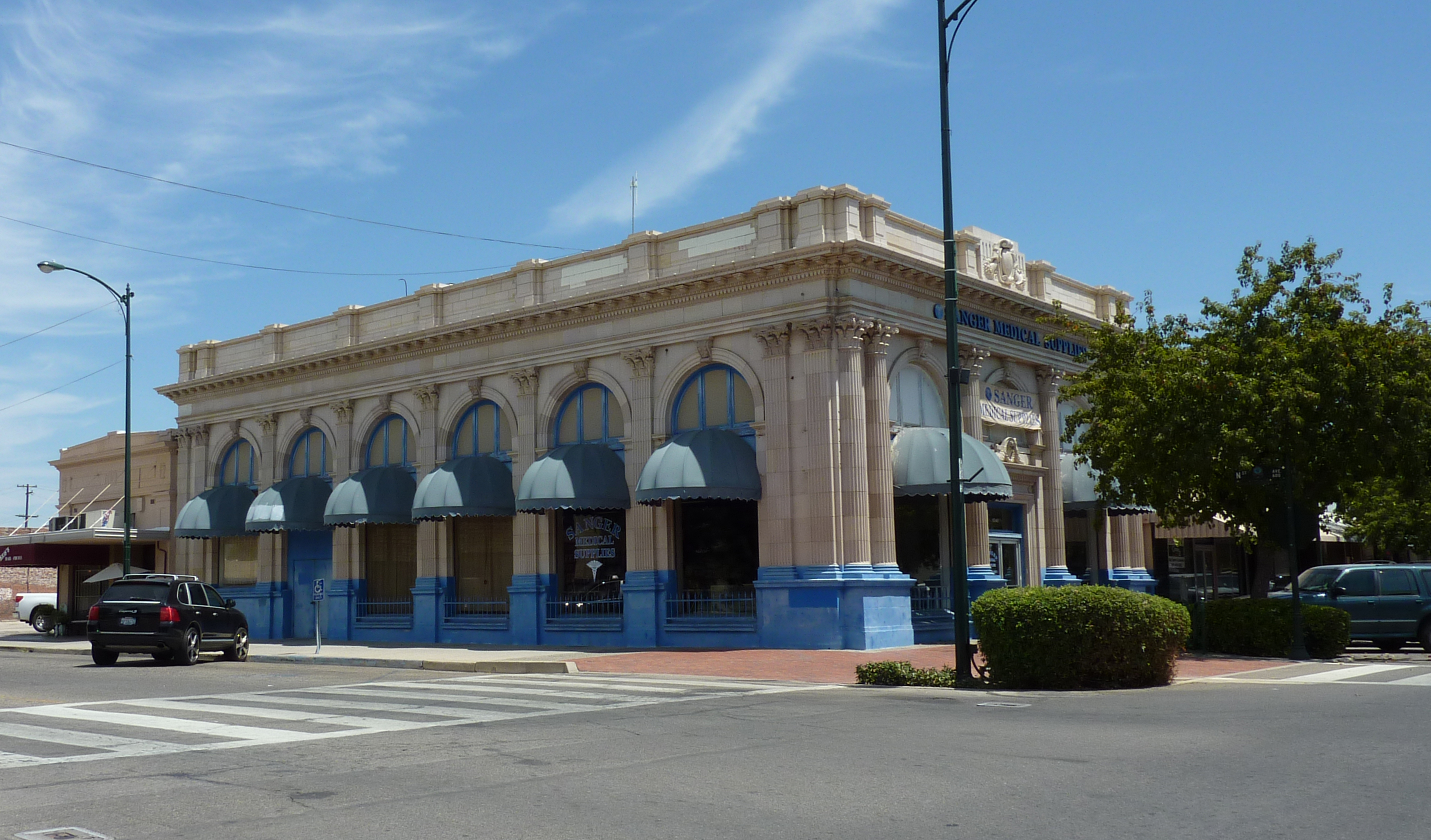
A former bank building in Sanger

=== 2020 census ===
As of the 2020 census, Sanger had a population of 26,617 and a population density of 4,615.4 inhabitants per square mile (1,782.0/km^{2}). The median age was 31.9 years. 30.1% of residents were under the age of 18 and 11.4% were 65 years of age or older. For every 100 females, there were 96.8 males, and for every 100 females age 18 and over, there were 95.0 males age 18 and over.

The census reported that 99.4% of the population lived in households, 0.3% lived in non-institutionalized group quarters, and 0.3% were institutionalized. 99.9% of residents lived in urban areas, while 0.1% lived in rural areas.

There were 7,577 households, of which 49.9% had children under the age of 18 living in them. Of all households, 49.5% were married-couple households, 8.8% were cohabiting couple households, 15.8% were households with a male householder and no spouse or partner present, and 25.9% were households with a female householder and no spouse or partner present. About 13.8% of all households were made up of individuals and 6.5% had someone living alone who was 65 years of age or older. The average household size was 3.49. There were 6,132 families (80.9% of all households).

There were 7,787 housing units at an average density of 1,350.3 units per square mile (521.4 units/km^{2}), of which 7,577 (97.3%) were occupied. Of occupied units, 58.6% were owner-occupied and 41.4% were occupied by renters. 2.7% of housing units were vacant; the homeowner vacancy rate was 0.4% and the rental vacancy rate was 2.5%.

Racial composition as of the 2020 census
| Race | Number | Percent |
|---|---|---|
| White | 8,323 | 31.3% |
| Black or African American | 272 | 1.0% |
| American Indian and Alaska Native | 436 | 1.6% |
| Asian | 870 | 3.3% |
| Native Hawaiian and Other Pacific Islander | 35 | 0.1% |
| Some other race | 11,221 | 42.2% |
| Two or more races | 5,460 | 20.5% |
| Hispanic or Latino (of any race) | 21,990 | 82.6% |

=== 2023 ACS 5-year estimates ===
In 2023, the US Census Bureau estimated that the median household income was $74,428, and the per capita income was $26,044. About 10.4% of families and 14.1% of the population were below the poverty line.

=== 2010 census ===
At the 2010 census Sanger had a population of 24,270. The population density was 4,393.7 inhabitants per square mile (1,696.4/km^{2}). The racial makeup of Sanger was 14,454 (59.6%) White, 219 (0.9%) African American, 311 (1.3%) Native American, 758 (3.1%) Asian, 39 (0.2%) Pacific Islander, 7,645 (31.5%) from other races, and 844 (3.5%) from two or more races. Hispanic or Latino of any race were 19,537 persons (80.5%).

The census reported that 24,136 people (99.4% of the population) lived in households, 46 (0.2%) lived in non-institutionalized group quarters, and 88 (0.4%) were institutionalized.

There were 6,659 households, 3,667 (55.1%) had children under the age of 18 living in them, 3,736 (56.1%) were opposite-sex married couples living together, 1,276 (19.2%) had a female householder with no husband present, 565 (8.5%) had a male householder with no wife present. There were 526 (7.9%) unmarried opposite-sex partnerships, and 49 (0.7%) same-sex married couples or partnerships. 894 households (13.4%) were one person and 459 (6.9%) had someone living alone who was 65 or older. The average household size was 3.62. There were 5,577 families (83.8% of households); the average family size was 3.90.

The age distribution was 8,164 people (33.6%) under the age of 18, 2,559 people (10.5%) aged 18 to 24, 6,685 people (27.5%) aged 25 to 44, 4,575 people (18.9%) aged 45 to 64, and 2,287 people (9.4%) who were 65 or older. The median age was 29.2 years. For every 100 females, there were 97.4 males. For every 100 females age 18 and over, there were 95.6 males.

There were 7,104 housing units at an average density of 1,286.1 per square mile (496.6/km^{2}), of which 6,659 were occupied, 3,873 (58.2%) by the owners and 2,786 (41.8%) by renters. The homeowner vacancy rate was 3.1%; the rental vacancy rate was 5.3%. 13,826 people (57.0% of the population) lived in owner-occupied housing units and 10,310 people (42.5%) lived in rental housing units.

== Arts and culture ==
In downtown Sanger, a mural of German-born actress Nastassja Kinski adorns the north-facing wall of the building at 1302 7th Street. Created in 1982 by artist Jose Maro Alvarado (B.A. Fine Arts, UC Santa Barbara), who grew up in Sanger, the mural is prominently visible when heading south on Academy Avenue Google Maps view. Other murals include that of Sanger native and NFL Hall of Fame inductee Tom Flores on the corner of 7th and N Street, completed in 2021 by Omar Huerta.

== Notable people ==
- Earl J. Atkisson – World War I Colonel in the US Army
- Tom Flores – Professional football player and coach and Pro Football Hall of Famer, Class of 2021
- Jim Merlo – Professional football linebacker for the New Orleans Saints from 1973 to 1979
- Manuel Neri – artist
- Luis Ortiz (born 1995) - baseball pitcher for the San Francisco Giants
- Edward Dean Price – United States federal judge
- Frankie A. Rodriguez – actor
- Francis Rogallo – aeronautical engineer and inventor
- Glenn Felix Aeronautical Engineer and Chief of Quality Control (powerplant) for the US Air Force Flight Test System (Edwards AFB) WWII Veteran; whose projects included from the J-34 engine to the XB-70 Valkyrie and the F-15 Flight Research Project.

== Education ==
Sanger Unified School District covers almost all of the city limits. Sanger High School services the community. Sanger West High School is present as well.

A non-contiguous piece of the city limits is in the Parlier Unified School District.
