= List of entertainment industry dynasties =

For the purposes of this list, an entertainment industry dynasty is defined as a set of at least 3 people with family ties (biological or by marriage), all of whom have acquired significant fame in the entertainment industry. The test of ‘fame’ is whether or not a Wikipedia page has been created for the person.

The list is intended to be international in the sense that it seeks coverage of dynasties from any country’s entertainment industry.

== A ==
- J. J. Abrams, Gracie Abrams, Gerald W. Abrams, Carol Ann Abrams, Katie McGrath
- Robert Alda, Alan Alda, Antony Alda, Beatrice Alda, Elizabeth Alda
- Woody Allen, Mia Farrow, Ronan Farrow, Letty Aronson
- Héctor Alterio, Ernesto Alterio, Malena Alterio
- John Aniston, Nancy Dow, Jennifer Aniston
- Pedro Armendáriz, Gloria Marín, Pedro Armendáriz, Jr.
- Cliff Arquette Lewis Arquette and his children: Patricia, Alexis, Rosanna, David and Richmond Arquette, Harlow Jane, Coco Arquette and Zoë Bleu

== B ==
- Maggie Baird, Billie Eilish, Finneas O'Connell
- Baldwin family: Alec Baldwin, Kim Basinger, Ireland Baldwin, Daniel Baldwin, William Baldwin,Chynna Phillips, Stephen Baldwin, Hailey Bieber, Justin Bieber
- Rafael Bardem, Matilde Muñoz Sampedro, Pilar Bardem, Juan Antonio Bardem, Carlos Bardem, Mónica Bardem, Javier BardemPenelope Cruz
- Barrymore family: Lionel Barrymore, Ethel Barrymore, John Barrymore, Drew Barrymore
- Batiste family: Alvin Batiste, Lionel Batiste, Milton Batiste, Russell Batiste Jr, Jon Batiste
- Edgar Bergen, Frances Bergen, Candice Bergen,Louis Malle
- Jon Bon Jovi, Jake Bongiovi, Millie Bobby Brown, Tony Bongiovi, Nina Yang Bongiovi
- Lucia Bosè, Miguel Bosé, Bimba Bosé, Dora Postigo
- Toni Braxton, Traci Braxton, Towanda Braxton, Trina Braxton, Tamar Braxton
- Lloyd Bridges, Dorothy Bridges, Jeff Bridges, Beau Bridges, Jordan Bridges
- James Brolin,Barbra Streisand, Josh Brolin, Eden Brolin

== C ==
- Carradine family: John Carradine, David Carradine, Keith Carradine, Robert Carradine, Calista Carradine, Ever Carradine, Shelley Plimpton, Martha Plimpton
- Carter Family: A. P. Carter, Ezra Carter, Sara Carter, Maybelle Carter, Helen Carter, Anita Carter, June Carter Cash, Janette Carter, Joe Carter, Johnny Cash, John Carter Cash
- Nick Carter, Aaron Carter, Leslie Carter
- Jean-Pierre Cassel, Vincent Cassel, Cécile Cassel, Rockin’ Squat
- Timothée Chalamet, Pauline Chalamet, Amy Lippman, Rodman Flender
- Chaplin family: Charlie Chaplin, Sydney Chaplin, Sydney Chaplin, Geraldine Chaplin, Oona Chaplin
- Mattie Moss Clark, Elbernita "Twinkie" Clark, Jacky Clark Chisholm, Dorinda Clark-Cole, Karen Clark Sheard, Denise "Niecy" Clark-Bradford, Kierra Sheard
- Rosemary Clooney, Nick Clooney, José Ferrer, Miguel Ferrer, George Clooney, Betty Clooney, Tessa Ferrer, Talia Balsam.
- Coppola family: Carmine Coppola, Italia Coppola, August Coppola, Christopher Coppola, Nicolas Cage, Francis Ford Coppola, Eleanor Coppola, Gian-Carlo Coppola, Gia Coppola, Roman Coppola, Sofia Coppola, Thomas Mars, Romy Mars, Talia Shire, Jack Schwartzman, Jason Schwartzman, Robert Schwartzman, Anton Coppola
- John Cromwell, Kay Johnson, James Cromwell, Julie Cobb, Anna Stuart
- Timothy Carlton Cumberbatch, Wanda Ventham, Benedict Cumberbatch
- Tony Curtis, Janet Leigh, Jamie Lee Curtis,Kelly Curtis, Christopher Guest
- Kit Culkin, Macaulay Culkin, Rory Culkin, Kieran Culkin, Bonnie Bedelia, Brenda Song
- Jeremy Cumpston, Hal Cumpston, Joseph Zada
- Dick Cusack, Joan Cusack, Ann Cusack, John Cusack
- Billy Ray Cyrus, Tish Cyrus, Miley Cyrus, Trace Cyrus, Brandi Cyrus, Noah Cyrus, Dominic Purcell

== D ==
- Ramón de Algeciras, Pepe de Lucía, Malú, Paco de Lucía
- Gérard Depardieu, Élisabeth Depardieu, Guillaume Depardieu, Julie Depardieu
- Johnny Depp, Vanessa Paradis, Lily-Rose Depp, Alysson Paradis
- Bruce Dern, Diane Ladd, Laura Dern
- Plácido Domingo Ferrer, Pepita Embil, Plácido Domingo, Marta Domingo, Plácido Domingo Jr.
- Kirk Douglas, Diana Douglas, Michael Douglas, Catherine Zeta-Jones, Joel Douglas, Cameron Douglas, Anne Buydens, Peter Douglas, Eric Douglas

== E ==
- Estevez family: Martin Sheen, Janet Sheen, Joe Estevez, Emilio Estevez, Ramon Estevez, Charlie Sheen, Renee Estevez

== F ==
- Vicente Fernández, Alejandro Fernández, Álex Fernández
- Lola Flores, Lolita Flores, Elena Furiase, Antonio Flores, Alba Flores, Rosario Flores
- Henry Fonda, Jane Fonda, Peter Fonda, Bridget Fonda, Danny Elfman
- Robin Fox family: Hilda Hanbury, Robin Fox, Edward Fox, James Fox, Robert Fox, Emilia Fox, Laurence Fox, Jack Fox, Freddie Fox.

== G ==
- Gaby, Fofó, Fofito, Rody, Miliki, Emilio Aragón
- Serge Gainsbourg, Jane Birkin, Charlotte Gainsbourg, Yvan Attal
- Judy Garland, Vincente Minnelli, Liza Minnelli
- Elliott Gould, Barbra Streisand, Jason Gould, Roslyn Kind
- Fernando Guillén, Gemma Cuervo, Fernando Guillén Cuervo, Cayetana Guillén Cuervo
- Gordy family: Berry Gordy, Esther Gordy Edwards, Anna Gordy Gaye, Gwen Gordy Fuqua, Robert Gordy, Kerry Gordy, Kennedy William Gordy, Rhonda Ross Kendrick, Stefan Kendal Gordy, Denise Gordy, Bianca Lawson, Skyler Austen Gordy, Marvin Gaye, Richard Lawson
- Gyllenhaal family: Stephen Gyllenhaal, Maggie Gyllenhaal, Jake Gyllenhaal

== H ==
- Ethan Hawke, Uma Thurman, Maya Hawke, Levon Hawke
- Tippi Hedren, Melanie Griffith, Don Johnson, Dakota Johnson
- Chris Hemsworth, Elsa Pataky, India Rose Hemsworth, Liam Hemsworth, Luke Hemsworth, Joanne van Os
- Cissy Houston, Gary Houston, Whitney Houston, Dee Dee Warwick, Dionne Warwick, Bobbi Kristina Brown, Leontyne Price, William Elliott, Damon Elliott
- Rance Howard, Ron Howard, Bryce Dallas Howard
- Bill Hudson, Goldie Hawn, Oliver Hudson, Kate Hudson, Mark Hudson, Sarah Hudson, Brett Hudson, Kurt Russell, Wyatt Russell
- Walter Huston, John Huston, Anjelica Huston, Danny Huston, Allegra Huston, Tony Huston, Jack Huston

== I-J ==
- Ronald Isley, Ernie Isley, Vernon Isley, Rudolph Isley, O'Kelly Isley Jr., Marvin Isley, Chris Jasper
- Julio Iglesias, Julio Iglesias Jr., Enrique Iglesias
- Jeremy Irons, Sinéad Cusack, Max Irons, Cyril Cusack, Maureen Cusack, Sorcha Cusack, Niamh Cusack, Pádraig Cusack, Catherine Cusack, Calam Lynch
- Jackson family: Jackie Jackson, Tito Jackson, Taj Jackson, Taryll Adren Jackson, Tito Joe Jackson, Jermaine Jackson, Jaafar Jackson, Marlon Jackson, Michael Jackson, Paris Jackson, Rebbie Jackson, Austin Brown, La Toya Jackson, Randy Jackson, Janet Jackson
- Kevin Jonas, Joe Jonas, Nick Jonas, Frankie Jonas, Priyanka Chopra, Danielle Jonas, Sophie Turner
- Quincy Jones, Peggy Lipton, Rashida Jones, Kidada Jones, Quincy Jones III, Kenya Kinski-Jones

== K ==
- Kardashian family: Kris Jenner, Kourtney Kardashian, Kim Kardashian, Khloé Kardashian, Kendall Jenner, Kylie Jenner
- Walter C. Kelly, George Kelly, Grace Kelly
- Klaus Kinski, Pola Kinski, Nastassja Kinski, Nikolai Kinski
- Mathew Knowles, Tina Knowles, Beyoncé, Jay-Z, Blue Ivy Carter, Solange Knowles, Angela Beyincé
- Lenny Kravitz, Lisa Bonet, Zoë Kravitz

== L ==
- Richard Lawson, Bianca Lawson, Ricky Lawson
- Vicenzo Leone (Roberto Roberti), Bice Valerian, Sergio Leone
- Lee Hoi-Chuen, Bruce Lee, Brandon Lee, Shannon Lee
- Michael Lohan, Dina Lohan, Lindsay Lohan, Aliana Lohan
- Edith Luckett Davis, Nancy Reagan, Ronald Reagan, Patti Davis
- Lupino family: Stanley Lupino, Connie O’Shea, Ida Lupino

== M-N ==
- Bob Marley, Rita Marley, Sharon Marley, Donisha Prendergast, Cedella Marley, Skip Marley, Ziggy Marley, Bambaata Marley, Stephen Marley, Jo Mersa Marley, Julian Marley, Ky-Mani Marley, Cindy Breakspeare, Damian Marley, Lauryn Hill, Selah Marley, YG Marley
- Ellis Marsalis Jr., Branford Marsalis, Wynton Marsalis, Delfeayo Marsalis, Jason Marsalis, Nicola Benedetti, Jasper Marsalis
- China Anne McClain, Sierra McClain, Lauryn McClain
- Steve McQueen, Neile Adams, Chad McQueen, Steven R. McQueen
- Antonio Molina, Ángela Molina, Olivia Molina, Mónica Molina
- Ricardo Montaner, Alejandro Montaner, Ricky Montaner, Mau Montaner, Evaluna Montaner
- Tia Mowry, Tamera Mowry, Tahj Mowry
- Murdoch family: Rupert Murdoch, Lachlan Murdoch, James Murdoch
- Alfred Newman, Emil Newman, Lionel Newman, Randy Newman, Thomas Newman

== O-P-Q ==
- Mary-Kate Olsen, Ashley Olsen, Elizabeth Olsen
- Leo Penn, Eileen Ryan, Michael Penn, Sean Penn, Chris Penn
- Elvis Presley, Priscilla Presley, Lisa Marie Presley, Riley Keough, Navarone Garibaldi, Michael Lockwood
- Dennis Quaid, Meg Ryan, Jack Quaid, Randy Quaid

== R ==
- Redgrave family: Roy Redgrave, Michael Redgrave, Vanessa Redgrave, Natasha Richardson, Joely Richardson
- Debbie Reynolds, Eddie Fisher, Carrie Fisher, Billie Lourd
- Rafael Rivelles, Amparo Rivelles, Carlos Larrañaga, María Luisa Merlo, Luis Merlo
- Carl Reiner, Estelle Reiner, Rob Reiner, Penny Marshall, Michele Singer, Tracy Reiner.
- Roberto Rosselllini, Ingrid Bergman, Isabella Rossellini
- Diana Ross, Barbara Ross-Lee, Arthur Ross, Rhonda Ross Kendrick, Tracee Ellis Ross, Evan Ross, Arne Næss Jr., Ashlee Simpson, Jessica Simpson
- Anthony J. Russo, Joseph Vincent Russo, Angela Russo-Otstot

== S ==
- Juan Salazar, Enrique Salazar, José Salazar, Encarna Salazar, Toñi Salazar
- Rafael Salazar, Rafael Farina, Tamara, Diego el Cigala
- Arnold Schwarzenegger, Katherine Schwarzenegger, Patrick Schwarzenegger, Joseph Baena
- Seydoux family: Jérôme Seydoux, Michel Seydoux, Léa Seydoux
- Charles Shyer, Nancy Meyers, Hallie Meyers-Shyer
- Stellan Skarsgård, Alexander Skarsgård, Gustaf Skarsgård, Bill Skarsgård, Valter Skarsgård
- Will Smith, Jada Pinkett Smith, Jaden Smith, Willow Smith
- Jussie Smollett, Jurnee Smollett, Jake Smollett
- Sylvester Stallone, Frank Stallone, Sage Stallone, Sistine Stallone
- Stiller and Meara: Jerry Stiller, Anne Meara, Ben Stiller, Amy Stiller
- Donald Sutherland, Kieffer Sutherland, Sara Sutherland

== T ==
- Jean-Louis Trintignant, Nadine Marquand, Marie Trintignant, Christian Marquand, Serge Marquand, Samuel Benchetrit
- Steven Tyler, Bebe Buell, Todd Rundgren, Liv Tyler, Cyrinda Foxe, Mia Tyler

== U-V-W ==
- Dick Van Dyke, Jerry Van Dyke, Barry Van Dyke
- Jon Voight, Angelina Jolie, James Haven, Chip Taylor, Marcheline Bertrand
- Denzel Washington, John David Washington, Katia Washington, Malcolm Washington, Olivia Washington
- Wayans family: Keenen Ivory Wayans, Damon Wayans, Kim Wayans, Marlon Wayans, Damon Wayans Jr.
- John Wayne, Patrick Wayne, Ethan Wayne
- D'Wayne Wiggins, Raphael Saadiq, Timothy Christian Riley, Dylan Wiggins
- Bruce Willis, Demi Moore, Rumer Willis, Emma Heming Willis
- Murry Wilson, Brian Wilson, Dennis Wilson, Carl Wilson, Mike Love
- Winans family: Pop Winans, Marvin Winans, Vickie Winans, Mario Winans, BeBe Winans, CeCe Winans, Juan Winans, Deborah Joy Winans

== Y-Z ==
- Darryl Zanuck, Richard Zanuck, Dean Zanuck
- Zulfikar family: Mahmoud Zulfikar, Ezz El-Dine Zulfikar, Salah Zulfikar

== See also ==
- List of show business families
- Lists of Indian film clans
  - Nepotism in Bollywood
    - List of Hindi film families
  - List of South Indian film families
- Film industry
- Entertainment
- Nepotism
