= Never Say Never Again (soundtrack) =

1993 film soundtrack album

Never Say Never Again: Original Motion Picture Soundtrack

Soundtrack album by Michel Legrand
- Released: September 11, 1993
- Recorded: 1983
- Genre: Film score
- Length: 62:05
- Label: Silva Screen Records

Never Say Never Again: Original Motion Picture Soundtrack is the soundtrack to the 1983 film Never Say Never Again. The album was composed by Michel Legrand and was released by Silva Screen Records on September 11, 1993.

== Development ==
James Horner was both director Irvin Kershner's and producer Jack Schwartzman's first choice to compose the score, after they were impressed with his work on Star Trek II: The Wrath of Khan. Horner, who worked in London for most of the time, was unavailable, according to Kershner, though Schwartzman later claimed Sean Connery vetoed him. Frequent Bond composer John Barry was invited, but declined out of loyalty to Eon. The music for Never Say Never Again was ultimately written by Michel Legrand, who composed a score similar to his work as a jazz pianist. For legal reasons, the filmmakers were not allowed to use a "James Bond Theme".

Legrand also wrote the main theme "Never Say Never Again", which featured lyrics by Alan and Marilyn Bergman — who had also worked with Legrand on the Academy Award-winning song "The Windmills of Your Mind" — and was performed by Lani Hall after Bonnie Tyler, who disliked the song, had reluctantly declined. Phyllis Hyman also recorded a potential theme song, with music written by Stephen Forsyth and lyrics by Jim Ryan, but the song — an unsolicited submission — was passed over, given Legrand's contractual obligations with the music.

== Track listing ==
| No. | Title | Artist | Length |
|---|---|---|---|
| 1. | "Bond Back in Action" | | 0:53 |
| 2. | "Never Say Never Again" | Lani Hall | 3:10 |
| 3. | "Prologue/Enter 007" | | 0:29 |
| 4. | "Fatima Blush/A Very Bad Lady" | | 3:49 |
| 5. | "Dinner with 007" | | 1:10 |
| 6. | "Bahama Island" | | 2:51 |
| 7. | "Bond Smells a Rat/Nurse Blush?" | | 1:29 |
| 8. | "Plunder of the Nuclear Missile" | | 1:58 |
| 9. | "The Big Band Death of Jack Petachi" | | 1:45 |
| 10. | "Bond and Domino" | | 2:06 |
| 11. | "Fight to Death with the Tiger Sharks" | | 4:52 |
| 12. | "Une chanson d'amour" | Sophie Della | 4:27 |
| 13. | "Video Duel/Victory" | | 1:54 |
| 14. | "Nuclear Nightmare" | | 1:08 |
| 15. | "Tango to Death" | | 2:23 |
| 16. | "Bond Returns Home" | | 0:28 |
| 17. | "The Death of Nicole/Chase Her" | | 1:24 |
| 18. | "Felix and James Exit" | | 0:39 |
| 19. | "Jealousy" | | 3:18 |
| 20. | "Largo's Waltz" | | 1:29 |
| 21. | "Bond to the Rescue" | | 4:45 |
| 22. | "The Big Escape" | | 1:22 |
| 23. | "Tears of Allah" | | 2:24 |
| 24. | "The Underwater Cave" | | 4:39 |
| 25. | "Fight to the Death" | | 2:19 |
| 26. | "Bond in Retirement/Never Say Never Again" | Lani Hall | 4:52 |
| Total length: | | | 62:05 |

== Release ==
The album was released by Silva Screen Records on September 11, 1993. An expanded 2-disc limited edition CD was released by La La Land Records in August 2026.

== Reception ==
The score has been criticised as "anachronistic and misjudged", "bizarrely intermittent" and "the most disappointing feature of the film".

== See also ==
- Outline of James Bond
