= Anton Coppola =

American opera conductor and composer (1917–2020)

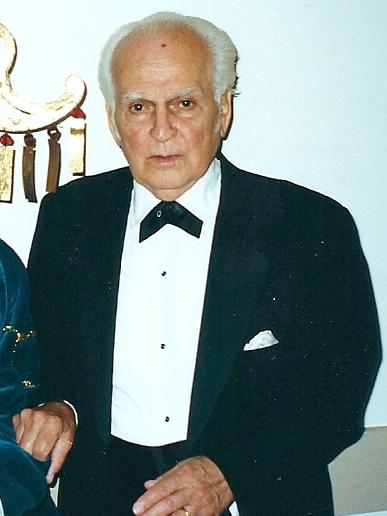
- Coppola backstage at the Belk Theater in Charlotte, North Carolina in 2001 during a production of Puccini's Turandot which he conducted for Opera Carolina.
- Born: Antonio Francesco Coppola; March 21, 1917; New York City, New York, U.S.
- Died: March 9, 2020 (aged 102); New York City, New York, U.S.
- Spouses: Marion Jane Miller (m. 1943, divorced) Almerinda Drago (m. 1950)
- Children: 3
- Relatives: Carmine Coppola (brother)
- Family: Coppola

Antonio Francesco Coppola (March 21, 1917 – March 9, 2020) was an American opera conductor and composer. He was the uncle of film director Francis Ford Coppola, academic August Coppola, and actress Talia Shire, as well as the great-uncle of Nicolas Cage, Christopher Coppola, Sofia Coppola, Gian-Carlo Coppola, Jason Schwartzman and Robert Schwartzman, and the younger brother of American composer and musician Carmine Coppola.

== Life ==
Coppola was born in Ocean Hill, Brooklyn, on March 21, 1917, but grew up mostly in East Harlem. He was the son of Maria (née Zasa) and Agostino Coppola, who came to the United States from Bernalda, Basilicata. Coppola started his career at the age of eight with the Metropolitan Opera Children's Chorus. At the age of 9 he was in the Met's debut of Turandot. He served as an army bandmaster during World War II, conductor at Radio City Music Hall and director of both the Symphony and Opera Departments at the Manhattan School of Music. He earned a bachelor's degree (1964) and a master's degree (1965) in composition from Manhattan School of Music and received honorary Doctorates from the University of Tampa and Quinnipiac University in Connecticut.

Coppola's first marriage was to Marion Jane Miller, a ballet dancer, with whom he had one child, Susan Marion Coppola (1943–2008). After their divorce, he wed Almerinda Drago in 1950, also a ballet dancer, with whom he had two children, Lucia and Bruno Coppola.

He became a great-great-grand-uncle in 2014 with the birth of his grand-nephew Nicolas Cage's grandson Lucian Augustus Coppola Cage, and he turned 100 in March 2017.

== Works ==
Among Coppola's compositions are a violin concerto, a symphony, and Sacco and Vanzetti, an opera in both Italian and English about immigrants Sacco and Vanzetti. In the 1950s and 1960s, Coppola was the musical director of six Broadway musicals, including Silk Stockings, Bravo Giovanni and The Boy Friend. He conducted two film scores, The Godfather Part III (1990) and Bram Stoker's Dracula (1992). He appeared in the former, shown conducting Cavalleria rusticana in the Teatro Massimo in Palermo.

He debuted with the New York City Opera in 1965, conducting the world premiere of Jack Beeson's Lizzie Borden, and led performances of Carmen (with Beverly Wolff, Richard Cassilly and Norman Treigle), La traviata, Il barbiere di Siviglia, and Madama Butterfly during the same year. At the Seattle Opera in 1970, Coppola led the world premiere of Carlisle Floyd's Of Mice and Men.

Coppola helped found Opera Tampa in 1996 and served as its Founding Artistic Director. Among his numerous productions with the company was the world premiere of Sacco and Vanzetti on March 17, 2001. He retired from the position in 2012.

Coppola was honored with the Lifetime Achievement Award from the Puccini Foundation and recognized by the Italian government as Cavaliere, Gran Ufficiale.

Coppola collaborated with the Orchestra Sinfonica di Milano Giuseppe Verdi, also known as Orchestra Verdi, and operatic soprano Angela Gheorghiu on a recording of Puccini works for EMI. This recording was later re-released with additional tracks recorded by Pappano and the Royal Opera House Orchestra, Covent Garden.

== Award ==
In 2008, Opera Tampa announced that an award was to be established in his name. The Anton Coppola Excellence in the Arts Award is presented annually to recognize an artist for significant contributions to Opera Tampa and the music world at large, and specifically for extraordinary work in the cultivation and care of the operatic art form. Coppola himself was the recipient of the award in 2012, the year of his retirement.

== Death ==
Coppola died on March 9, 2020, just 12 days shy of his 103rd birthday, in Manhattan.

== Filmography ==
- The Godfather Part III (1990) - Conductor of 'Cavalleria Rusticana' (uncredited)
- Mozart in the Jungle (2015) - Anton Gallo

== See also ==
- Coppola family tree
