= Bed & Breakfast (1992 film) =

- Directed by: Robert Ellis Miller
- Written by: Cindy Myers
- Produced by: Jack Schwartzman
- Starring: Roger Moore; Talia Shire; Colleen Dewhurst; Nina Siemaszko
- Cinematography: Peter Shea; Peter Sova
- Edited by: John F. Burnett; Richard Leeman
- Music by: David Shire
- Production company: Schwartzman Pictures
- Distributed by: Hemdale Film Corporation
- Release dates: 1991 (Finland); September 1991 (Norway); September 23, 1991 (Germany); August 7, 1992 (United States)
- Running time: 97 minutes
- Country: United States
- Language: English

Bed & Breakfast is a 1991 American romantic comedy film directed by Robert Ellis Miller, and stars Roger Moore, Talia Shire, Colleen Dewhurst (in her final film role) and Nina Siemaszko. It began filming on York Beach, Maine, in 1989.

== Plot ==
A charming Englishman changes the lives of three generations of women who run a near-bankrupt bed and breakfast. Three women find him out cold on a beach and offer him free board in return for fixing the place up and being the handy man. Claire, widow of Senator Blake Wellesly, is initially unwilling to let him in the house, partly due to the mystery around him caused by amnesia. Her mother-in-law Ruth, recently retired and craving adventure, insists on allowing him inside. Claire's teenage daughter Cassie, who is rebellious against her mother's old-fashioned behavior most of the time, names him Adam.

== Cast ==
- Roger Moore as Adam
- Talia Shire as Claire Wellesly
- Colleen Dewhurst as Ruth Wellesly
- Nina Siemaszko as Cassie Wellesly
- Ford Rainey as Amos
- Stephen Root as Randolph
- Jamie Walters as Mitch
- Cameron Arnett as Hilton
- Bryant Bradshaw as Julius
- Victor Slezak as Alex Caxton
- Jake Weber as Bobby
