= Opera Tampa =

Opera Tampa is an American opera company located in Tampa, Florida, where it is resident company at the Straz Center for the Performing Arts.

== History ==
Opera Tampa debuted in 1996 with its first production, Madama Butterfly. Since then, the company has produced one or more full-scale operas annually, featuring international performers, the Opera Tampa Orchestra and the 50-60 member Opera Tampa Chorus. Helping to establish the company was composer-conductor Anton Coppola, Opera Tampa's founding artistic director from 1996 until he retired in 2012. A high point for the company under his direction was the world-premier of his opera Sacco and Vanzetti on March 17, 2001.

== Today ==
Coppola's successor as artistic director is Daniel Lipton, born 1941.9.23 in Paris, who formerly headed Canada's Opera Hamilton in Ontario, Canada in 1986. For Lipton's first season with Opera Tampa, the company launched the "Florida Opera Festival", a month-long series of opera and opera-related concerts and events, including performances from guests such as classical-crossover vocalist Katherine Jenkins. The festival opened with A Masked Ball (Un Ballo in Maschera) and closed with La Bohème, the company's major opera productions for 2013.

Opera Tampa is managed by its general director, Judith Lisi, who also serves as president of the "Straz" (David A. Straz Jr. Center for the Performing Arts). The Straz's 2,600-seat Carol Morsani Hall is the primary venue for the company's major productions. Its current musical director is Robin Stamper, an alum of Juilliard School.

=== Award ===
In 2008, Opera Tampa announced it would honor its founding director by establishing The Anton Coppola Excellence in the Arts Award. The annual award is given to recognize an artist for significant contributions to Opera Tampa and the music world at large, and specifically for extraordinary work in the cultivation and care of the operatic art form. Coppola himself was recipient of the award in 2012, the year of his retirement.

==== Recipients by year ====
Year	Award recipient
2009	Renata Scotto
2010	Carlisle Floyd
2011	Plácido Domingo
2012	Anton Coppola
2013	Martina Arroyo
