= San Fernando Mission Cemetery =

Historic cemetery in Mission Hills, Los Angeles, California

San Fernando Mission Cemetery & Mission Hills Catholic Mortuary
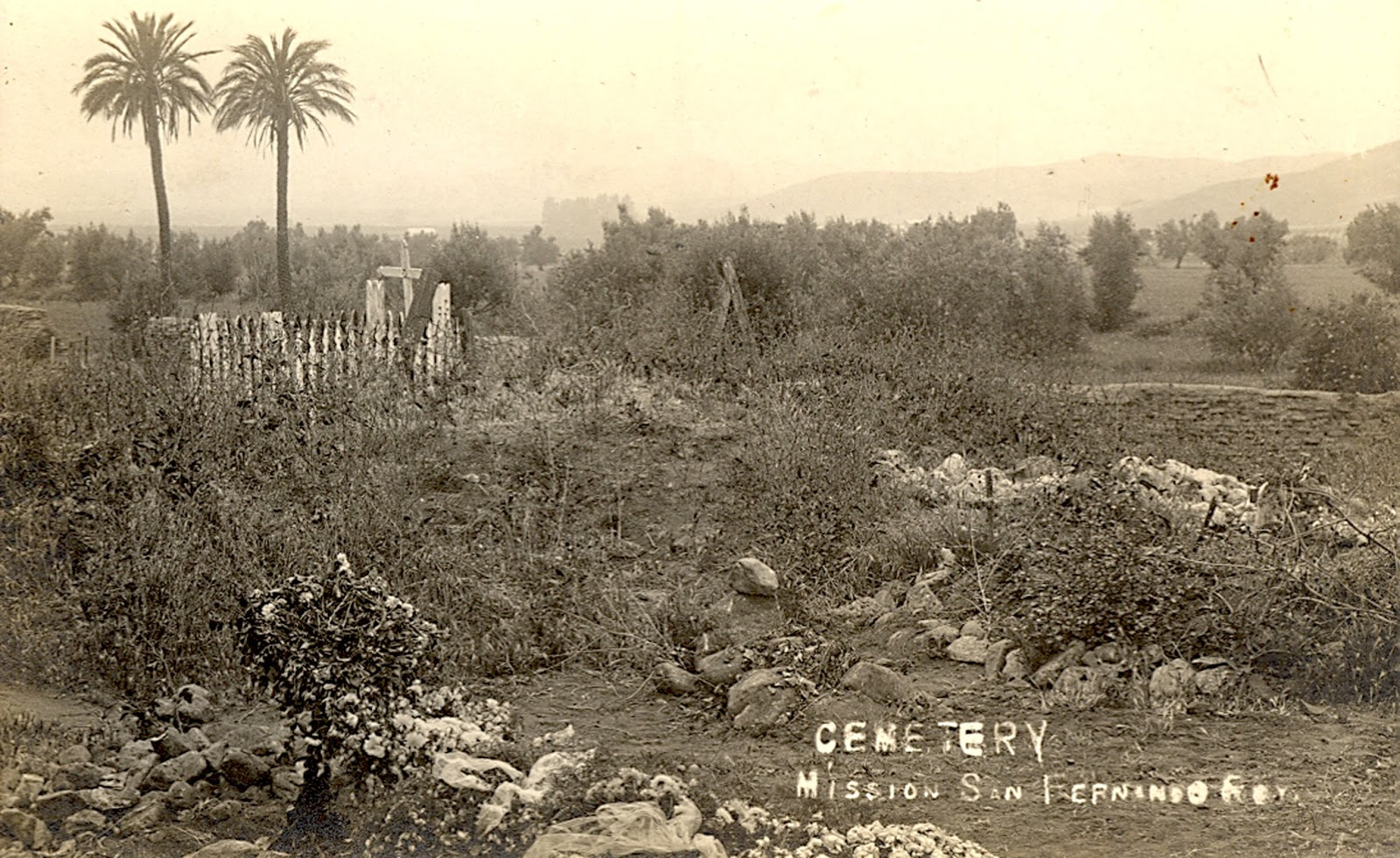
- The cemetery circa 1895
- Interactive map of San Fernando Mission Cemetery & Mission Hills Catholic Mortuary

Details
- Established: 1800
- Location: Mission Hills, Los Angeles, California
- Country: United States
- Coordinates: 34°16′35″N 118°27′56″W
- Type: Catholic
- Owned by: Archdiocese of Los Angeles
- No. of graves: >30,000
- Website: https://catholiccm.org/san-fernando-mission-cemetery-mission-hills-catholic-mortuary
- Find a Grave: San Fernando Mission Cemetery & Mission Hills Catholic Mortuary

The San Fernando Mission Cemetery, a significant part of the Mission Hills community in the San Fernando Valley of Los Angeles, is steeped in history. It stands adjacent to the iconic San Fernando Mission, also known as Mission San Fernando Rey de España and the revered Bishop Alemany Catholic High School.

Owned and operated by the Archdiocese of Los Angeles since its founding, the current cemetery began its operations on December 15, 1952, with the interment of Sinferosa Real Ruiz, a parishioner of the nearby Santa Rosa Church. She was raised on the Camulos Rancho, which was made famous by the Ramona pageant. The cemetery was dedicated on November 1, 1953, by Cardinal Jam Francis McIntyre.

The Catholic Cemeteries Department manages the cemetery on behalf of the Archdiocese of Los Angeles. San Fernando Mission Cemetery offers diverse burial options, including Lawn Crypts, Crypts, Niches, and various cremation services. Plans are in place for future developments related to burials and inurnments.

The Archdiocese also operates Mission Hills Catholic Mortuary through its Funeral and Mortuary Services Corporation, which took ownership of the mortuary services in 2016. Offering a Chapel that seats 160, reception area and visitation rooms. The mortuary specializes in providing comprehensive Catholic funeral services, ensuring that every aspect of the ceremony and burial aligns with the traditions and values of the Catholic faith.

The San Fernando Mission Cemetery remains an active site, providing burial, entombment, and cremation options for members of the Catholic faith and their families.

== Notable interments ==
=== A ===
- Philip Abbott (1924–1998), actor
- Edward Arnold (1890–1956), actor
- Michele Yvette Avila (1968–1985), murder victim

=== B ===
- Charles Beaumont (1929–1967), author and screenwriter
- Scotty Beckett (1929–1968), actor
- Ed Begley (1901–1970), actor
- William Bendix (1906–1964), actor
- Larry J. Blake (1914–1982), actor
- Loretta Blake (1898–1981) actress
- Walter Brennan (1894–1974), actor
- Evelyn Brent (1899–1975), actress
- George Burditt (1923–2013), television director

=== C ===
- Candy Candido (1913–1999), actor and voice-over artist
- Bobby Chacon (1951–2016), boxer
- Celso Chavez (1968-2012), musician
- Jerry Colonna (1904–1986), actor and comedian
- Betty Compson (1897–1974), actress
- Chuck Connors (1921–1992), actor
- Carmine (1910–1991) and Italia Coppola (1912–2004), parents of filmmaker Francis Ford Coppola.
- Henry Corden (1920–2005), actor and voice-over artist
- Joseph Crehan (1883–1966), actor

=== D ===
- Lee de Forest (1873–1961), physicist & electrical engineer, inventor of the triode
- Roy Del Ruth (1893–1961), movie director
- Carmen Dragon (1914–1984), composer and conductor, father of Daryl Dragon
- Tom Dugan (1889–1955), actor
- Allan Dwan (1885–1981), director, producer, screenwriter
- John Jacob DeBron (1902–1983) Gaffer for MGM Studios, father of John “Jack” DeBron Special Effects for MGM Studios

=== F ===
- Frank Faylen (1905–1985), actor
- Dick Foran (1910–1979), actor
- Harry Fox (1882–1959), stage and movie star, "Fox-Trot" dance inventor
- William Frawley (1887–1966), actor

=== G ===
- Teri Garr (1944–2024), actress
- Anita Garvin (1907–1994), actress
- Bert Glennon (1893–1967), cinematographer
- George Gobel (1919–1991), actor and comedian
- Peter Graves (1926–2010), actor

=== H ===
- William Haade (1903–1966), actor
- Ray Heindorf (1908–1980), composer
- Pat Hogan (1920–1966), actor
- Bob Hope (1903–2003), actor and comedian
- Dolores Hope (1909–2011), singer and wife of Bob Hope
- Carol Hughes (1910–1995), actress, wife of Frank Faylen

=== J ===
- Alice Joyce (1890–1955), actress

=== K ===
- Bob Kelley (1917–1966), sportscaster
- Dorothea Kent (1916–1990), actress
- Peggy Knudsen (1923–1980), actress

=== L ===
- Rosemary LaPlanche (1923–1979), actress
- Charles Lamont (1895–1993), director
- Winnie Lightner (1899–1971), actress, comedian and singer
- Richard Loo (1903–1983), actor
- Edmund Lowe (1892–1971), actor
- Ken Lynch (1910–1990), actor

=== M ===
- Michael Maltese (1908–1981), animation screenwriter
- Robert L. Manahan (1956–2000), actor
- Adele Mara (1923–2010), actress
- June Marlowe (1903–1984), actress (original burial site; remains later moved to Cathedral of Our Lady of the Angels)
- Bob May (1939–2009), actor and stuntman
- Frank Milano (1891–1970), gangster
- Kathryn Minner (1892–1969), actress
- Lee Moran (1888–1961), actor

=== N ===
- Clarence Nash (1904–1985), voice-over artist
- Fred Niblo Jr. (1903–1973), screenwriter, son of Fred Niblo
- Thomas Noonan (1921–1968), actor and comedian
- Eva Novak (1898–1988), actress, sister of Jane Novak
- Jane Novak (1896–1990), actress, sister of Eva Novak
- Jay Novello (1904–1982), actor

=== O ===
- Henry O'Neill (1891–1961), actor
- Ernie Orsatti (1902–1968), major league baseball player
- Artie Ortego (1890–1960), actor

=== P ===
- William H. Parker (1905–1966), police chief of Los Angeles
- William Perkins (1947–1967), Cpl, USMC Medal of Honor Recipient
- Paul Picerni (1922–2011), actor

=== Q ===
- Eddie Quillan (1907–1990), actor
- Bill Quinn (1912–1994), actor
- Elvia Quiroz (1929-2016), beautician to the stars, artist

=== R ===
- Jobyna Ralston (1900–1967), actress
- Ted Fio Rito (1900–1971), musician
- Estelita Rodriguez (1928–1966), actress
- M. Frank Rudy (1925–2009), inventor of Nike Air Sole

=== S ===
- Teddy Sampson (1895–1970), actress
- Olga San Juan (1927–2009), actress
- Jan Shepard (1928-2025), actress
- Trinidad Silva (1950–1988), actor
- Penny Singleton (1908–2003), actress and first female president of an AFL–CIO union

=== T ===
- Gloria Talbott (1931–2000), actress
- Felipe Turich (1898–1992), actor, husband of Rosa Turich
- Rosa Turich (1903–1998), actress, wife of Felipe Turich

=== V ===
- Ritchie Valens (1941–1959), singer

=== W ===
- James Westerfield (1913–1971), actor
- Michael Whalen (1902–1974), actor
- Frank Wilcox (1907–1974), actor
- Jane Wyatt (1910–2006), actress

== See also ==
- Burials at San Fernando Mission Cemetery
- Burials at Spanish missions in California
- History of the San Fernando Valley
