= The Butchers =

1970 film

- DVD Cover
- Directed by: Paulmichael Miekhe
- Written by: Paulmichel Miekhe; Leonard Turner
- Produced by: Leonard Turner
- Starring: K.T. Baumann; Morgan Upton; Ford Clay; Robert Walden; Vic Tayback
- Cinematography: Robert Primes
- Edited by: Jay Hansell
- Music by: Tom Glass
- Distributed by: Troma Entertainment
- Release date: 1970
- Running time: 88 minutes
- Country: United States
- Language: English

The Butchers (also known as Maxie and Murderer's Keep) is a 1970 thriller set in Crockett, California and directed by Paulmichael Miekhe and distributed by Troma Entertainment.

== Plot ==
The film follows a deaf girl who witnesses a dead body being stashed in a nearby butcher shop. Not wanting to take the risk of being caught, the murderous butchers decide to kidnap her.

== Cast ==
- Robert Walden
- Vic Tayback
- Talia Shire
- Donald Pleasence

== Home media ==
The film was released on DVD on May 31, 2005.
