= Carmine Coppola =

American composer (1910–1991)

- Born: Carmine Valentino Coppola; June 11, 1910; New York City, U.S.
- Died: April 26, 1991 (aged 80); Los Angeles, California, U.S.
- Resting place: San Fernando Mission Cemetery, Los Angeles
- Occupations: Composer; musician
- Spouse: Italia Pennino (m. 1933)
- Children: August Coppola; Francis Ford Coppola; Talia Shire
- Family: Coppola
- Musical career
- Genres: Contemporary classical; big band; electronic; film score; avant garde
- Instruments: Flute; piano; synthesizer
- Years active: 1949–1991

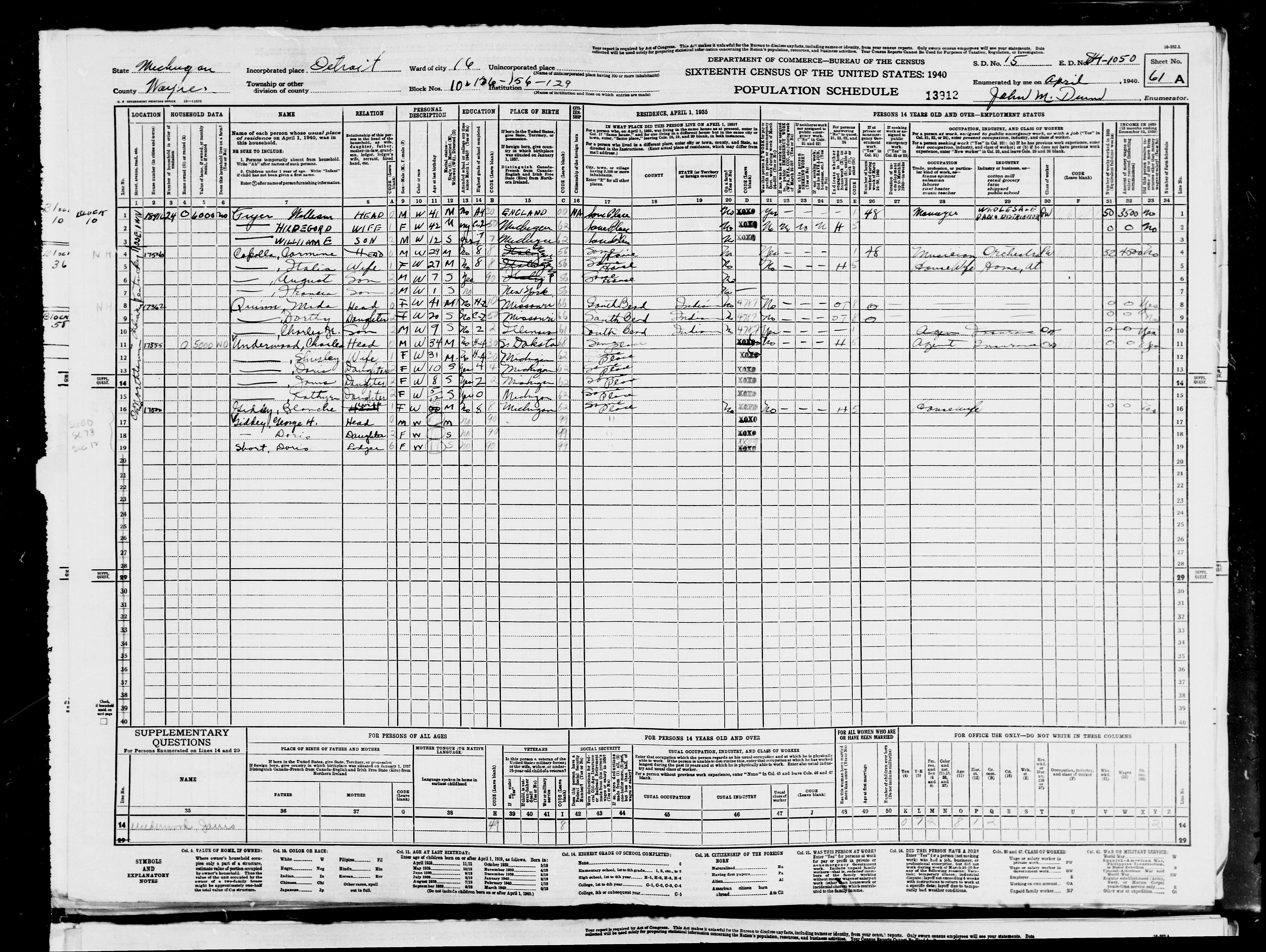
Carmine Coppola (1910-1991) in the 1940 U.S. census living in Detroit, Michigan

Carmine Valentino Coppola (Italian: [ˈkarmine ˈkɔppola]; June 11, 1910 – April 26, 1991) was an American composer, flutist, pianist, and songwriter who contributed original music to the films The Godfather, The Godfather Part II, Apocalypse Now, The Outsiders, The Black Stallion, and The Godfather Part III. He is the father of film director Francis Ford Coppola. In the course of his career, he won both the Academy Award for Best Original Score and the Golden Globe Award for Best Original Score, in addition to nominations for the BAFTA Award for Best Original Music and Grammy Award for Best Score Soundtrack for Visual Media.

== Personal life ==
Coppola was born in New York City, the son of Maria (née Zasa) and Agostino Coppola, who came to the United States from Bernalda, Basilicata. His brother was opera conductor and composer Anton Coppola. He was the father of August Coppola, Francis Ford Coppola and Talia Shire, and grandfather of Nicolas Cage, Sofia Coppola, Roman Coppola, Jason Schwartzman, Robert Schwartzman, and the late Gian-Carlo Coppola.

Coppola died in Northridge, California, at the age of 80 in 1991. His wife, Italia, died in 2004 in Los Angeles. According to Francis, his father suffered from a stroke on the night of the Academy Awards, due to the shock of not winning an award for "Best Original Song". Both Coppola and his wife are buried at San Fernando Mission Cemetery.

== Career ==
Coppola played the flute. He studied at Juilliard, later at the Manhattan School of Music and privately with Joseph Schillinger. During the 1940s, Coppola worked under Arturo Toscanini with the NBC Symphony Orchestra. Then in 1951, Coppola left the Orchestra to pursue his dream of composing music. During that time he mostly worked as an orchestra conductor on Broadway and elsewhere, working with his son, filmmaker Francis Ford Coppola, on additional music for his Finian's Rainbow.

Carmine contributed to the music performed in the wedding scene in The Godfather (1972). Later, his son called on him to compose additional music for the score of The Godfather Part II (1974), in which he and his father received an in-movie tribute with the characters Agostino and Carmine Coppola, who appear in a deleted scene from the young Vito Corleone flashback segments. Principal score composer Nino Rota and Carmine together won Oscars for Best Score for the film. He also composed most of the score for The Godfather Part III (1990). He made cameo appearances in all three Godfather films as a conductor.

Carmine and Francis together scored Apocalypse Now (1979), for which they won a Golden Globe Award for best original score. He also composed a three-and-a-half-hour score for American showings of Kevin Brownlow's reconstruction of Abel Gance's 1927 epic Napoléon. Carmine composed the music for The Black Stallion (1979), on which Francis was executive producer, and four other films directed by his son in the 1980s. In his audio commentary on The Godfather Part III DVD, Francis said that his father missed a cue during the shooting of that film's opening wedding reception—something he never did in his prime. At that point, Francis realized that his father had little time left. As it turned out, Carmine died less than four months after Part III premiered, of a stroke.

== Filmography ==
=== Collaborations with Francis Ford Coppola ===
Year	Film	Notes
1959	Battle Beyond the Sun	English-language reedit of Nebo Zovyot; Composed with Yuliy Meitus & Vyacheslav Mescherin
1962	Tonight for Sure	—N/a
1969	The Rain People	Composed with Ronald Stein
1974	The Godfather Part II	Composed with Nino Rota Academy Award for Best Original Score
1979	Apocalypse Now	Composed with Francis Ford Coppola Golden Globe Award for Best Original Score; Nominated- BAFTA Award for Best Film Music; Nominated- Grammy Award for Best Score Soundtrack for Visual Media
1980	Napoléon	Reedit of 1927 film supervised by Coppola
1983	The Outsiders	—N/a
1987	Faerie Tale Theatre	Television series Episode: "Rip Van Winkle"
1987	Gardens of Stone	—N/a
1988	Tucker: The Man and His Dream	Composed with Joe Jackson
1989	New York Stories	Segment: "Life Without Zoe"
1990	The Godfather Part III	Nominated- Academy Award for Best Original Song; Nominated- Golden Globe Award for Best Original Score; Nominated- Golden Globe Award for Best Original Song

=== Collaboration with other directors ===
Year	Film	Director	Notes
1968	The Green Berets	John Wayne; Ray Kellogg	As flautist Score composed by Miklós Rózsa
1971	THX 1138	George Lucas	As flautist & orchestrator Score composed by Lalo Schifrin
1972	The People	John Korty	Television film
1977	Mustang: The House That Joe Built	Robert Guralnick	Documentary film
1979	The Black Stallion	Carroll Ballard	Los Angeles Film Critics Association Award for Best Music; Nominated- Golden Globe Award for Best Original Score
1989	Blood Red	Peter Masterson	—N/a

== See also ==
- Coppola family tree
