= The Creature of the Sunny Side Up Trailer Park =

The Creature of the Sunnyside Up Trailer Park
- Redesign of Bloodhead poster by Steve Vance
- Directed by: Christopher Coppola
- Written by: Adrienne Stout
- Produced by: Alain Silver
- Starring: Steve Hedden; Andre Ware; Frank Gorshin; Bernie Kopell; Lynda Carter; Shirley Jones
- Cinematography: Andrew Giannetta; Mark Kohl
- Music by: Ernest Troost
- Release date: 2004
- Running time: 105 minutes
- Country: United States
- Language: English

The Creature of the Sunnyside Up Trailer Park, originally titled Bloodhead, is a 2004 comedy horror film, directed by Christopher Coppola. The film also stars Bernie Kopell, Lynda Carter, Fort Atkinson, Stephanie Dees, T'Keyah Crystal Keymáh and Frank Gorshin.

Variety reported contemporaneously on the production as "being shot on high-definition digital cameras." It was filmed from June through September, 2002 in 29 Palms, California and at the Culver Studios.

In 2014, the film was one of three features directed by Christopher Coppola that was licensed to Fandor, where it was retitled as Cult of the Evil Geezers. The New York Times reported its release on Fandor as "Z-grade horror flick/comedy, also titled 'The Creature of the Sunny Side Up Trailer Park,' about a demonic cult and racial prejudice."

== Plot ==
The lead characters, one black and one white and both racists, are Donnie played by Andre Ware and Doug played by Steve Hedden. They co-inherit a trailer park near the Joshua Tree National Monument, southeastern California. Despite their antagonism, they join forces to battle a monster created by retired cultists living in the park and stalking its other denizens. Eventually they discover that they are fraternal twins, whose Caucasian archeologist mother Shirley Jones was married to an African-American serviceman.

== Reception ==
The movie debuted in March, 2004 as Bloodhead at the San Francisco Horror Film Festival/Another Hole in the Head and was reviewed for Variety by Dennis Harvey, who wrote "Working on a larger scale than usual, Christopher Coppola cooks up an idiosyncratic dish in "Bloodhead" aka "The Curse of Bloodhead," which pays tribute to drive-in monster flicks, '70s TV icons..." Harvey singled out supporting performances by Lynda Carter, Bernie Kopell, and Frank Gorshin and "delightful 'excerpts' from a supposed B&W regional horror called 'Texas Vampire Massacre,'" before concluding that "High-def-shot pic looked very good projected in 35mm." Critic Brian McKay offered 4 out of 5 stars and opined that "BLOODHEAD stands firmly on its own as a worthwhile tribute to the B movies of yesteryear, and a simple but effective denouncement of the ignorance that breeds racism. And it's pretty damn funny, too."
