= Coppola family =

Italian-American film family

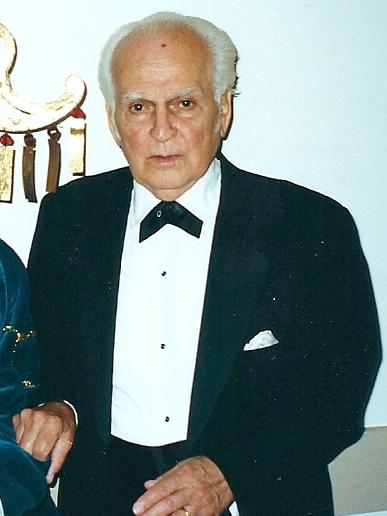
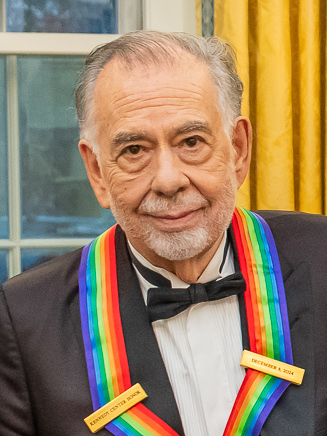
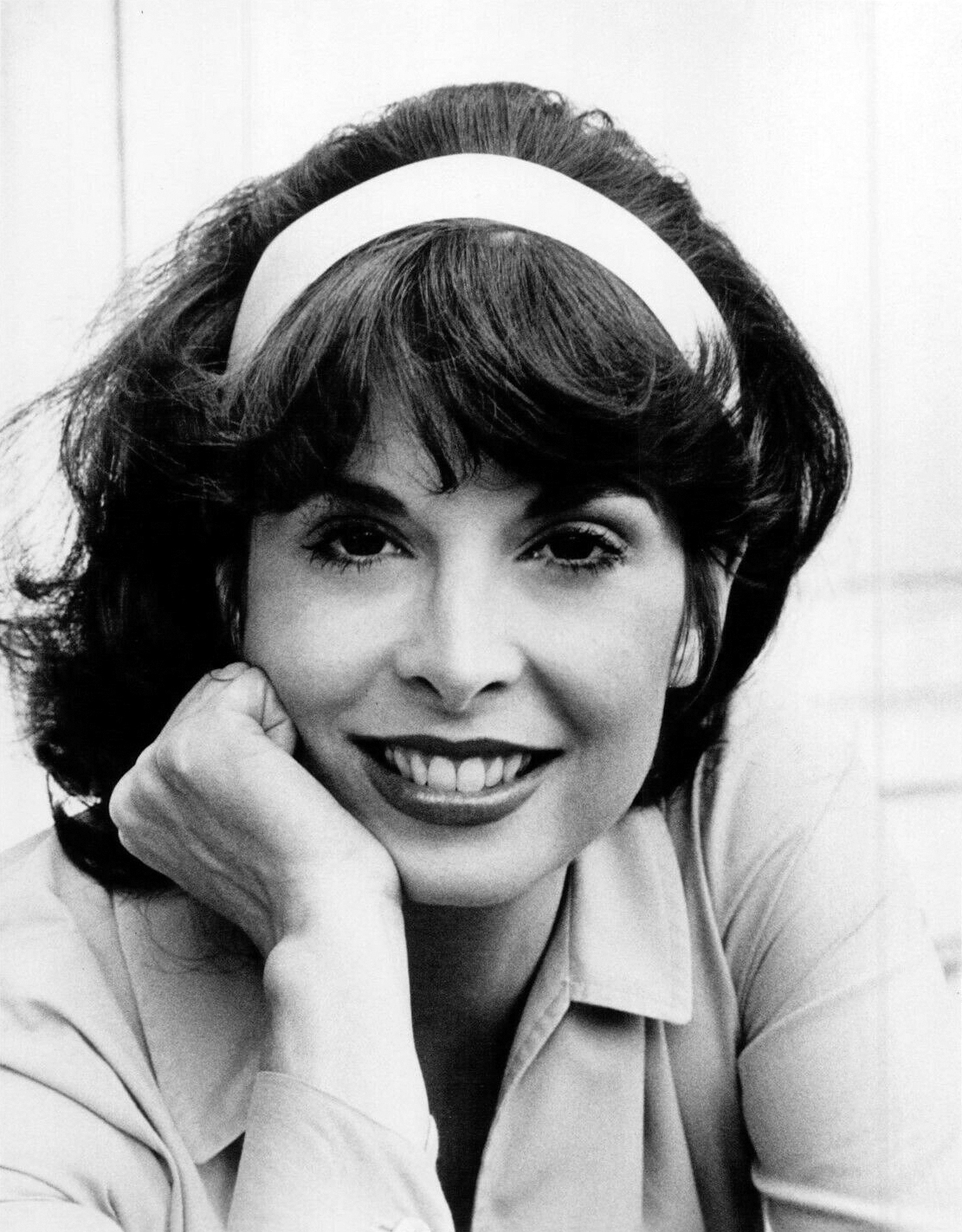
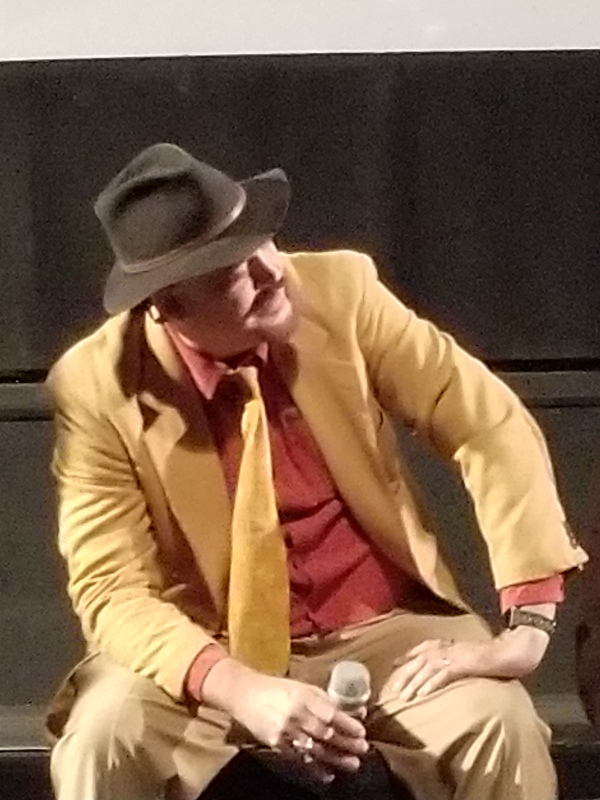
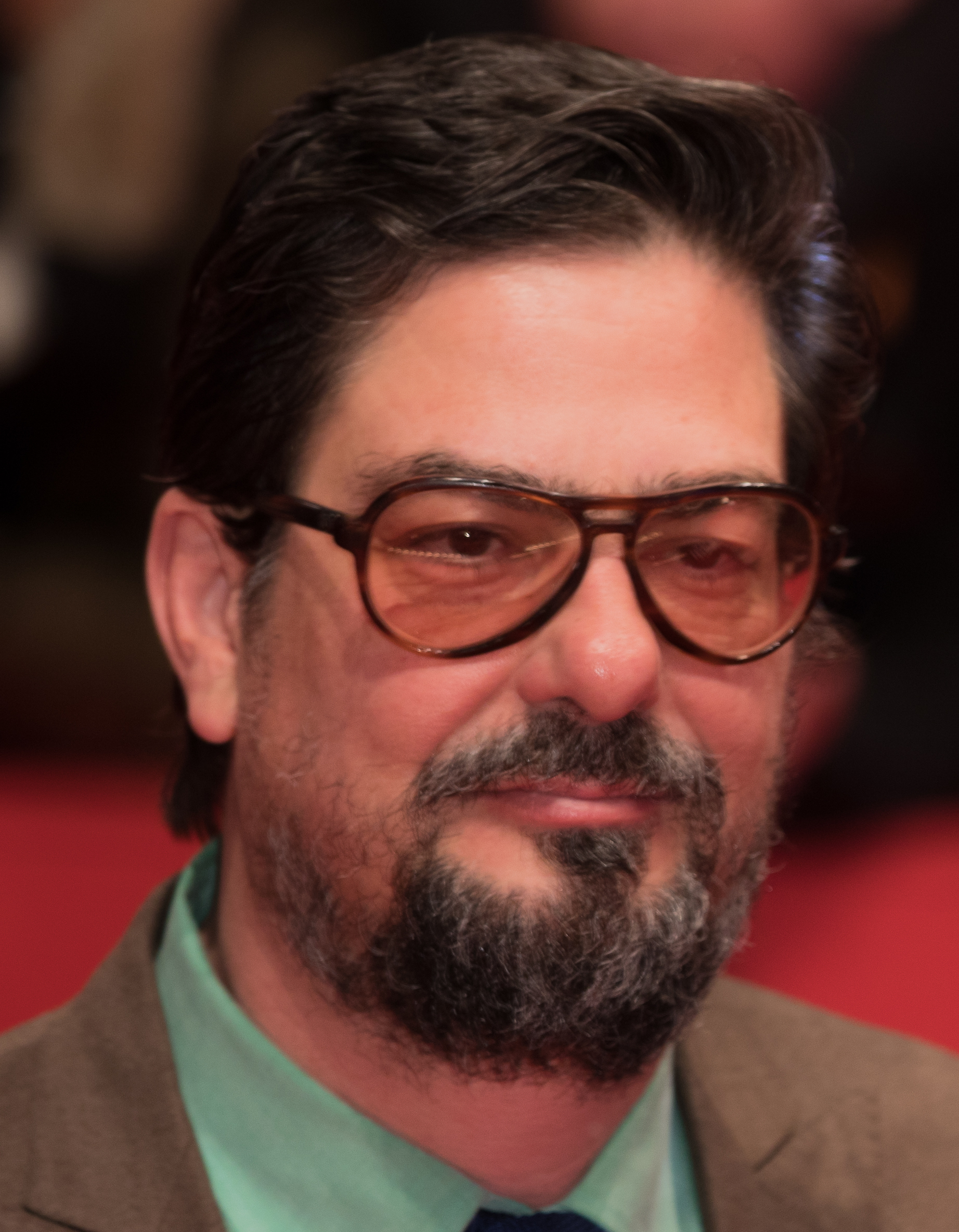
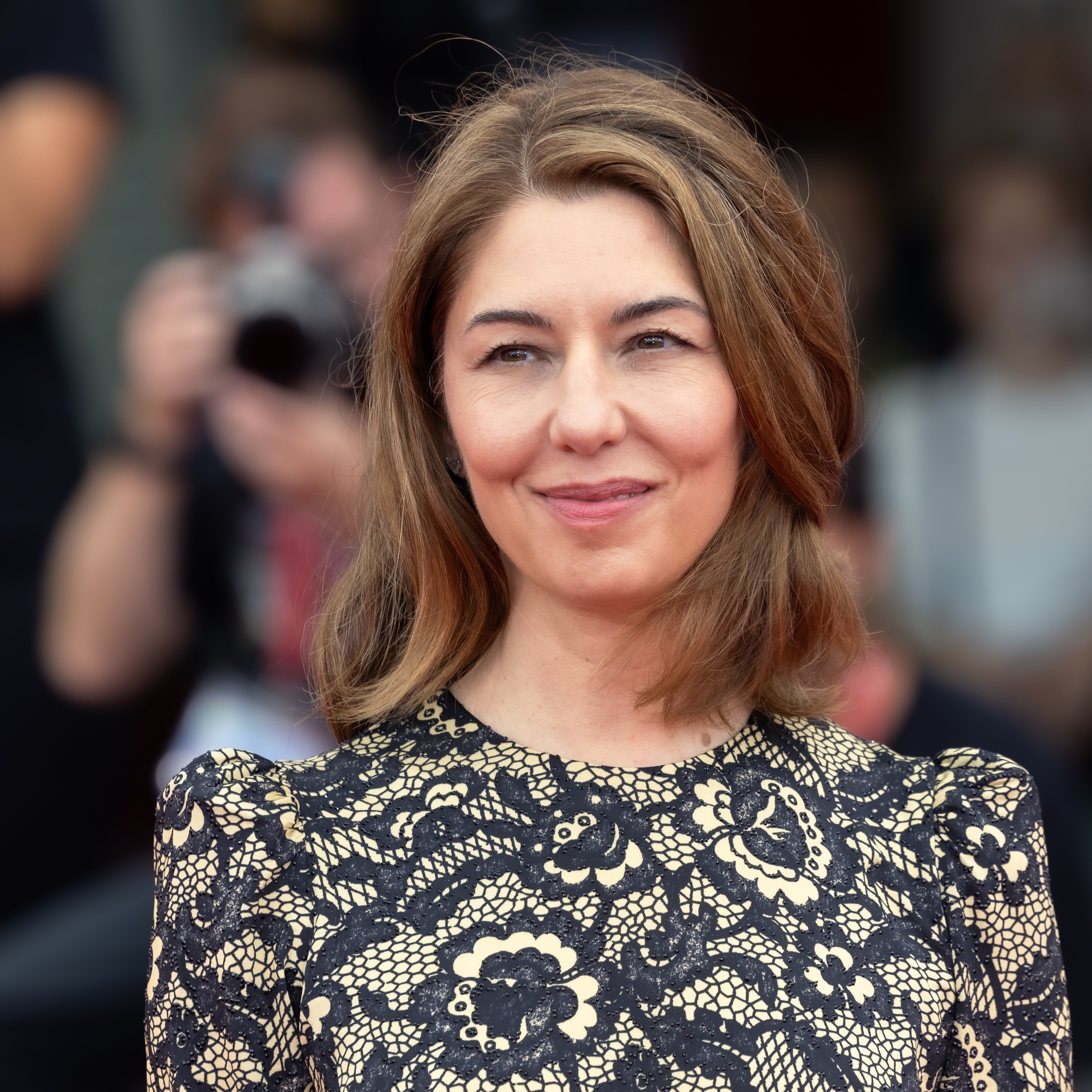
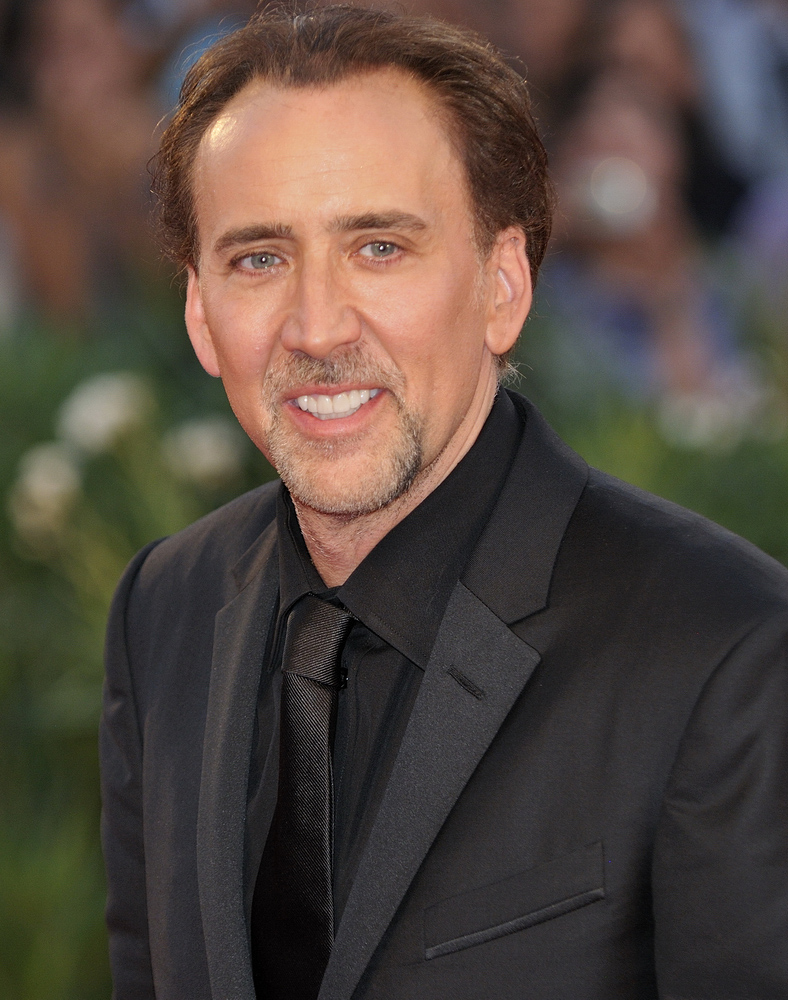
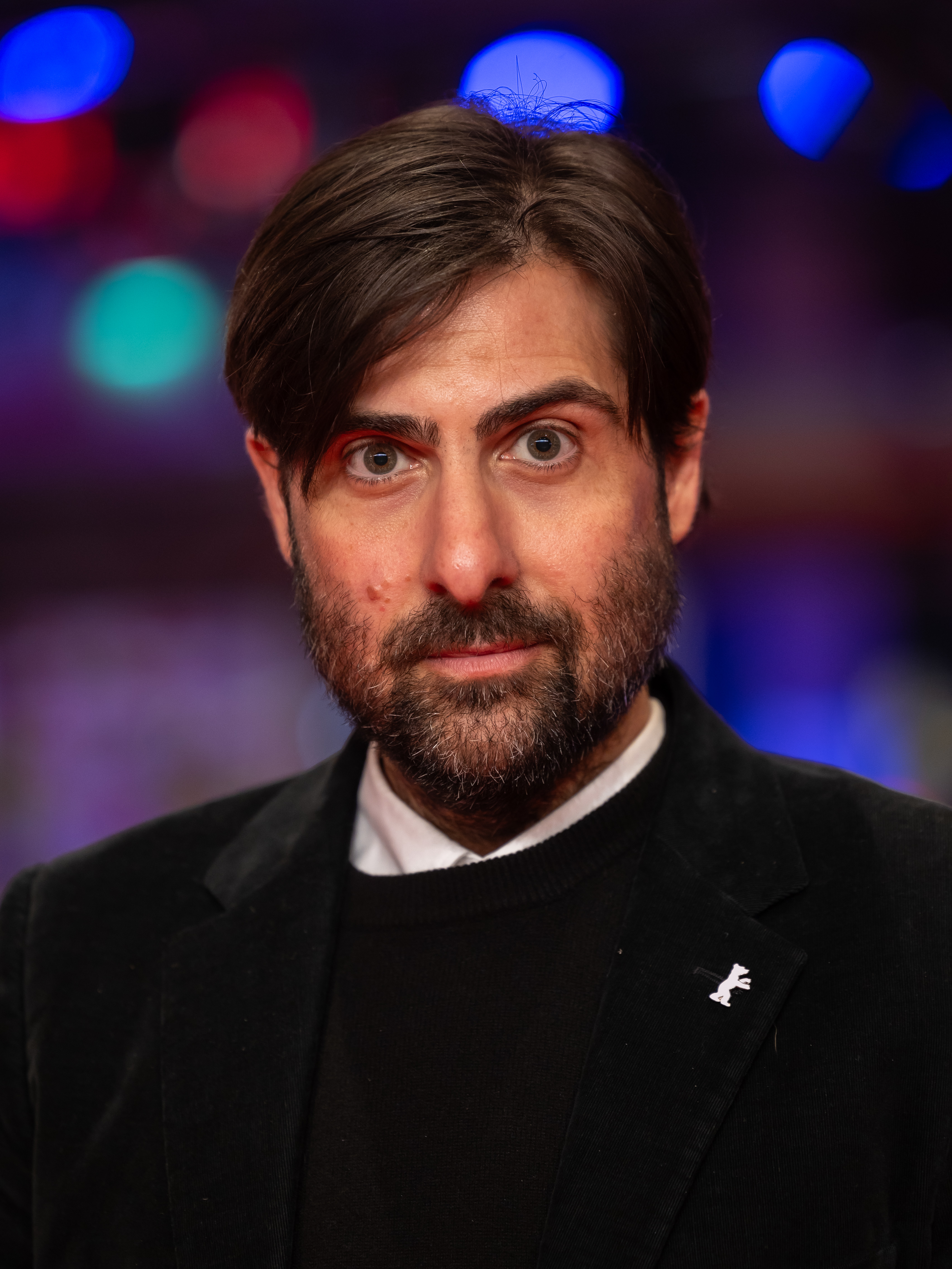
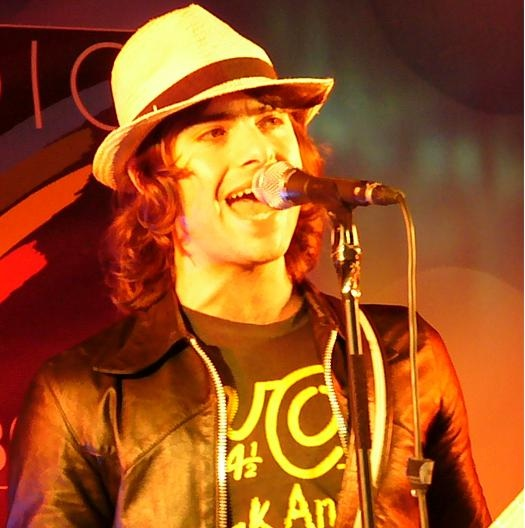
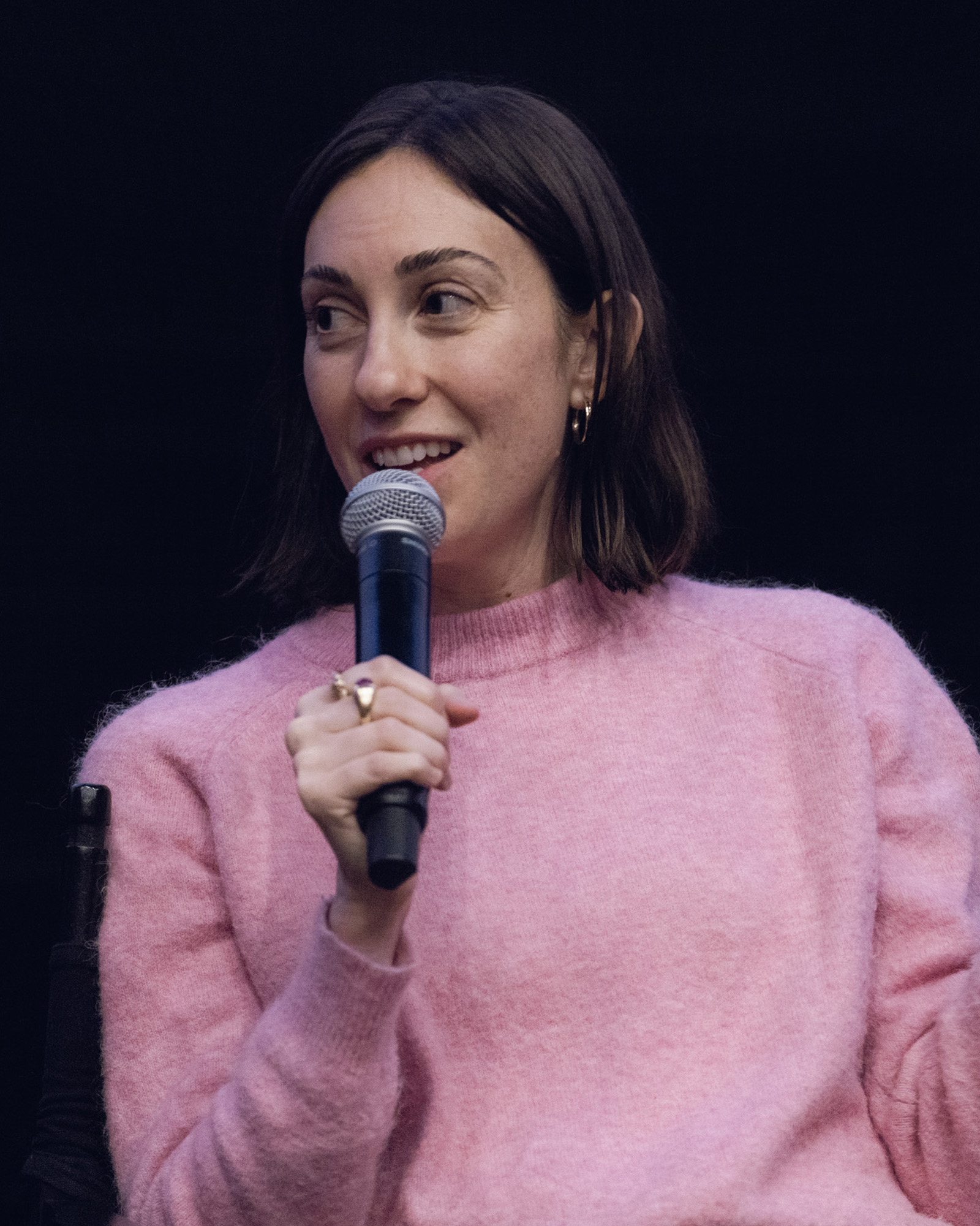
- Country: United States
- Current region: California; New York
- Etymology: Italian term for flat cap
- Origin: Bernalda, Italy
- Founded: January 28, 1908 (marriage of Agostino Coppola and Maria Zasa, New York City)
- Distinctions: 8 Academy Awards; 10 Golden Globes; 2 BAFTA Awards; 1 Grammy Award; 2 Palme d'Or; 1 Golden Lion
- Estate: Inglenook

The Coppola family (/ˈkoʊpələ/ KOH-pə-lə, Italian: [ˈkɔppola]) is an Italian-American family of filmmakers and performing artists. The family originates from Agostino "August" Coppola (1882–1946) and Maria Zasa (1887–1974), both immigrants to the United States from Bernalda in the region of Basilicata, who married on January 25, 1908. They had seven children, Archimedes, Carmine, Pancrazzo, Mario, Anton, Edward and Clarence; two of these, Anton and Carmine, had music careers in the 20th century.

Third and fourth generation family members, including Francis Ford Coppola, Talia Shire, Sofia Coppola, Jason Schwartzman and Nicolas Cage, are descended from Carmine Coppola. Over five decades, they have earned multiple Academy Awards wins and nominations, with seven out of nine members of the extended family topping the list of Oscar-winning families.

Francis Ford Coppola, a son of Carmine, co-founded the film production company American Zoetrope with fellow filmmaker George Lucas and cemented his career by directing the gangster film The Godfather (1972), regarded by many critics as one of the greatest films ever made. He is a prominent figure of the New Hollywood era and was a dominant force in the Hollywood film industry in the 1970s and 1980s, and his descendants have independently continued the family legacy.

== History ==
=== Generations ===
The first generation originates from Bernalda in the region of Basilicata. Agostino "August" Coppola (1882–1946) immigrated to the United States circa 1905. He married Maria Zasa (1887–1974) (also from Bernalda) on January 25, 1908. They had seven children — Archimedes, Carmine, Pancrazzo, Mario, Anton, Edward and Clarence - of whom two, Anton and Carmine, would continue the family’s legacy in the entertainment industry.

Out of the seven second generation Coppola siblings, only Anton and Carmine worked in the entertainment industry in the 20th century. Carmine worked as a composer with his wife Italia Pennino, had three children: university professor August Floyd, filmmaker Francis Ford, and actress Talia Rose. Carmine’s brother, Anton, also a composer and conductor, and had three children as well. However, neither Anton’s children nor any of his descendants, would go into the entertainment industry. From the third generation on, those Coppolas working in the industry all descend from Carmine Coppola and his three children.

Although Carmine’s son August was a professor and not in the entertainment industry, all three of his children - actor and DJ Marc, actor-director Christopher, and actor Nicolas Cage - were or are, part of the fourth Coppola generation in the industry.

Carmine’s other son, Francis Ford, was the first Coppola to reach superstardom and fame in Hollywood, as a director and producer. Like his older brother August, Francis Ford and his wife Eleanor Neil had three children, and all three are in entertainment: producer Gian-Carlo, filmmaker Roman François, and former actress and filmmaker Sofia Carmina, the only granddaughter of Carmine and Italia. Therefore, all six children of the two third generation Coppola brothers, August and Francis, were actively worked in the entertainment industry until Gian-Carlo's death from a speedboat accident in 1986.

Carmine’s youngest child and only daughter Talia was a Hollywood actress and adopted the Shire family name upon her marriage to David Shire. Just like her two older brothers, she has three children from her two marriages: screenwriter Matthew Orlando Shire from her first marriage to Shire, and actor-screenwriter-musician Jason Schwartzman and director-actor-musician Robert Schwartzman from her second marriage to Jack Schwartzman.

Carmine died in 1991. Eight of his surviving grandchildren are continuing the family's legacy. Gian-Carla "Gia" Coppola, granddaughter of Francis Ford, went on to become a filmmaker, also continuing this legacy.

=== Family tree ===
Marc Coppola (b. 1958)
Natasha Downing (b. 1990)
Elizabeth Coppola (b. 1962)
Cayley Coppola (b.2003)
Christopher Coppola (b. 1962)
August Floyd Coppola (1934–2009)	Zachary Ferry Coppola (b. 2003)
Alba Metaponte
Joy Vogelsang (1935–2021)	Dexter Coppola
Christina Fulton
Weston Coppola Cage (b. 1990)
Nicolas Kim Coppola (a.k.a. Nicolas Cage) (b. 1964)
Kal-El Coppola Cage (b. 2005)
Alice Kim
August Francesca Coppola Cage (b. 2022)
Riko Shibata
Gian-Carlo Coppola (1963–1986)
Gian-Carla Coppola (a.k.a. Gia Coppola) (b. 1987)
Carmine Coppola (1910–1991)	Jacqui de la Fontaine
Francis Ford Coppola (b. 1939)
Italia Pennino (1912–2004)	Roman Coppola (b. 1965)
Eleanor Neil (1936–2024)
Sofia Coppola (b. 1971)
Romy Mars (b. 2006)
Thomas Pablo Croquet (a.k.a. Thomas Mars) (b. 1976)
David Shire (b. 1937)	Cosima Mars (b. 2010)
Matthew Orlando; Shire
Talia Rose Coppola (a.k.a. Talia Shire) (b. 1946)
Jason Schwartzman (b. 1980)
Jack Schwartzman (1932–1994)	Marlowe Rivers Schwartzman (b. 2010)
Brady Cunningham
Una Schwartzman (b. 2014)
Robert Coppola Schwartzman (b. 1982)
Marion Jane Miller
Susan Marion Coppola (1943–2008)
Anton Coppola (1917–2020)
Lucia Coppola
Almerinda Drago
Bruno Coppola

== Academy Awards ==
The lineal descendants of Carmine Coppola and Italia Pennino have been nominated 24 times for an Academy Award, winning 8 times in categories including Best Picture, Best Director, Best Actor, Best Original Screenplay, Best Adapted Screenplay, and Best Original Score. Only four legitimate members of the family are Academy Award-winners: Carmine, Francis Ford, Nicolas Cage, and Sofia.

In addition, family in-laws such as Talia Shire's ex-husband David Shire, Sofia Coppola's ex-husband Spike Jonze, and Nicolas Cage's ex-wife Patricia Arquette are also Academy Award winners. Talia Shire's late husband Jack Schwartzman is also the father of Oscar nominee John Schwartzman by a previous marriage.

Academy Awards
	Wins	Nominations
Carmine Coppola	1	2
Francis Ford Coppola	5	14
Talia Shire	0	2
Nicolas Cage	1	2
Roman Coppola	0	1
Sofia Coppola	1	3

=== Coppola family Academy Awards nominations ===
Year	Category	Recipient	Work	Result
1971	Best Original Screenplay	Francis Ford Coppola (Note: Shared with Edmund H. North)	Patton	Won
1973	Best Director	Francis Ford Coppola	The Godfather	Nominated
1973	Best Adapted Screenplay	Francis Ford Coppola (Note: Shared with Mario Puzo)	The Godfather	Won
1974	Best Picture	Francis Ford Coppola (Note: Shared with Gary Kurtz)	American Graffiti	Nominated
1975	Best Picture	Francis Ford Coppola (Note: Shared with Gray Frederickson and Fred Roos)	The Godfather Part II	Won
1975	Best Picture	Francis Ford Coppola	The Godfather Part II	Nominated
1975	Best Director	Francis Ford Coppola	The Godfather Part II	Won
1975	Best Supporting Actress	Talia Shire	The Godfather Part II	Nominated
1975	Best Adapted Screenplay	Francis Ford Coppola	The Godfather Part II	Won
1975	Best Adapted Screenplay	Francis Ford Coppola	The Conversation	Nominated
1975	Best Original Dramatic Score	Carmine Coppola (Note: Shared with Nino Rota)	The Godfather Part II	Won
1976	Best Actress	Talia Shire	Rocky	Nominated
1980	Best Picture	Francis Ford Coppola (Note: Shared with Fred Roos, Gray Frederickson and Tom Sternberg)	Apocalypse Now	Nominated
1980	Best Director	Francis Ford Coppola	Apocalypse Now	Nominated
1980	Best Adapted Screenplay	Francis Ford Coppola (Note: Shared with John Milius)	Apocalypse Now	Nominated
1991	Best Picture	Francis Ford Coppola	The Godfather Part III	Nominated
1991	Best Director	Francis Ford Coppola	The Godfather Part III	Nominated
1991	Best Original Song	Carmine Coppola (Note: Shared with John Bettis)	The Godfather Part III	Nominated
1996	Best Actor	Nicolas Cage	Leaving Las Vegas	Won
2003	Best Actor	Nicolas Cage	Adaptation	Nominated
2004	Best Picture	Sofia Coppola	Lost in Translation	Nominated
2004	Best Director	Sofia Coppola	Lost in Translation	Nominated
2004	Best Original Screenplay	Sofia Coppola	Lost in Translation	Won
2011	Irving G. Thalberg Award	Francis Ford Coppola		Honored
2013	Best Original Screenplay	Roman Coppola (Note: Shared with Wes Anderson)	Moonrise Kingdom	Nominated

== Controversy ==
Due to Francis Ford's heritage as a patriarch of the family, several media outlets accused Francis Ford of nepotism for casting his children in his films since The Godfather—including his daughter Sofia, who appeared in The Godfather Part III. Despite positive reviews, this negatively impacted her career as an actress; Sofia shifted away from her acting career to filmmaking in 1999; her last on-screen performance was in CQ in 2001.

This affected Francis Ford's nephews Nicolas Cage and Jason Schwartzman, who also have been attributed to the aid of Francis Ford's filmography. Cage changed his last name to distance himself from such charges.

== See also ==
- List of entertainment industry dynasties
