= Italia Coppola =

Coppola family matriarch (1912–2004)

- Italia at her daughter's wedding (the hand belongs to Talia, cropped out of this image)
- Born: Italia Pennino; December 12, 1912; Brooklyn, New York City, U.S.
- Died: January 21, 2004 (aged 91); Los Angeles, California, U.S.
- Resting place: San Fernando Mission Cemetery, Los Angeles
- Spouse: Carmine Coppola (m. 1933; died 1991)
- Children: August Coppola; Francis Ford Coppola; Talia Shire
- Family: Coppola (by marriage)

Italia Coppola (Italian: [iˈtaːlja ˈkɔppola]; née Pennino [penˈniːno]; December 12, 1912 – January 21, 2004) was the matriarch of the Coppola family. She appeared in three non-speaking roles in her son Francis Ford Coppola's films, One from the Heart, The Godfather Part II, and The Godfather Part III. She was known for her Italian cooking and published a cookbook called Mama Coppola's Pasta Book in 2000. Francis Ford Coppola named his 1998 Edizione Pennino zinfandel after her family's name and Italian heritage, and her nickname "Mammarella" is the name of her pasta and sauce line made by him.

== Early life ==
Born in an apartment over the family's Empire Theater in Brooklyn, New York City, she was the youngest of six children of Anna (née Giaquinto) and Francesco Pennino, both from Naples, Italy. Her father, graduated at San Pietro a Majella, was a musician and composer of Italian songs (particularly Neapolitan songs), an importer of silent Italian films and a movie theater owner. Her five brothers were Louis, Rosary, Alfred, Humbert and Victor.

== Coppola family matriarch ==
Italia Pennino Coppola was the wife of Carmine Coppola and the mother of academic August Coppola, filmmaker Francis Ford Coppola and actress Talia Shire, as well as the maternal grandmother of actors Jason Schwartzman, Robert Carmine and writer Matthew Shire, and the paternal aunt of talent manager Anthony Pennino, and paternal grandmother of actors Nicolas Cage, Marc Coppola and directors Roman Coppola, Christopher Coppola and Sofia Coppola.

Under her maiden name, Pennino, Italia Coppola was a lyricist known for writing "Non ci lasceremo mai", Connie's wedding song from The Godfather, the Sicilian lyrics for "Ninna-nanna a Michele", consisting of "The Godfather Waltz" and "Michael's Theme", composed by Nino Rota and sung by Nino Palermo in The Godfather Part II soundtrack, "Come Back to Love (the Chief's Death)" from Apocalypse Now, and songs from Carmine Coppola themes from Napoleon, The Black Stallion, and The Outsiders.

Italia Pennino Coppola is buried in San Fernando Mission Cemetery alongside her husband.

== Filmography ==
Year	Title	Role	Notes
1972	The Godfather	Extra in Wedding Scene	Uncredited
1974	The Godfather Part II	Mama Corleone's Body	Uncredited
1982	One from the Heart	Couple in Elevator #2	
1990	The Godfather Part III	Signora Altobello	Uncredited (final film role)

== See also ==
- Coppola family tree
