= Sacco and Vanzetti (Coppola opera) =

2001 opera

- Premiere: 2001; Opera Tampa

Sacco and Vanzetti is a 2001 opera by Anton Coppola.

== Development ==
Francis Ford Coppola recommended the idea of an opera based on Sacco and Vanzetti to his uncle Anton Coppola. It premiered at Opera Tampa in 2001. Coppola was the theater's conductor and founding artistic director between 1995 and 2012. Though it was not staged elsewhere, Coppola considered it his best work.
