= Eleanor Coppola =

American documentary film director (1936–2024)

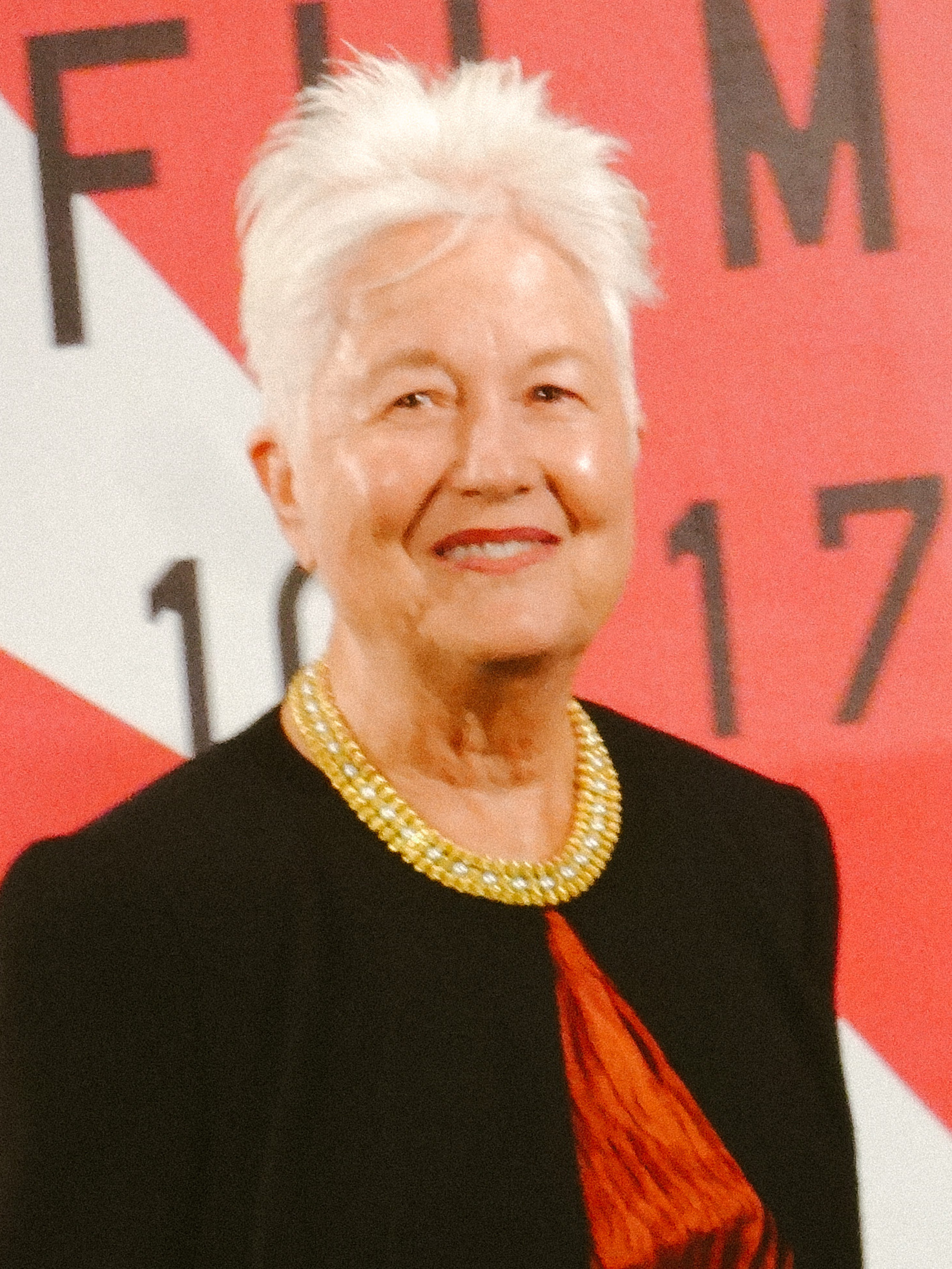
- Coppola in 2013
- Born: Eleanor Jessie Neil; May 4, 1936; Los Angeles, California, U.S.
- Died: April 12, 2024 (aged 87); Rutherford, California, U.S.
- Education: University of California, Los Angeles
- Occupations: Director; writer; artist; cinematographer
- Years active: 1963–2024
- Spouse: Francis Ford Coppola (m. 1963)
- Children: Gian-Carlo; Roman; Sofia
- Relatives: Bill Neil (brother); Coppola family (by marriage)

Eleanor Jessie Coppola (née Neil; May 4, 1936 – April 12, 2024) was an American documentary film director, screenwriter, and artist. A member of the Coppola family, she was married to director Francis Ford Coppola from 1963 until her death. She was best known for her 1991 documentary film Hearts of Darkness: A Filmmaker's Apocalypse as well as other documentaries chronicling the films of her husband and children.

== Early and personal life ==
Eleanor Coppola was born Eleanor Jessie Neil on May 4, 1936, in Los Angeles, California. Her father was a political cartoonist for the Los Angeles Examiner who died when she was 10 years old. She and her two brothers were raised by their mother, Delphine Neil (née Lougheed) in Sunset Beach, California. She has English and Irish ancestry. Her brother Bill became a noted visual effects artist. She graduated from UCLA with a degree in applied design and was a member of the women's fraternity Alpha Chi Omega (Alpha Psi chapter).

While working on the set of the 1963 horror film Dementia 13, she met her future husband Francis Ford Coppola. Her position was assistant art director, and he was making his directorial debut with the film. They had been dating for several months when Eleanor discovered in 1963 that she was pregnant. Initially, Eleanor considered giving the baby up for adoption, but he convinced her otherwise. The couple married in Las Vegas on February 2, 1963, and Eleanor later gave birth to their first son, Gian-Carlo Coppola. Years later, Eleanor gave birth to Roman and Sofia Coppola.

== Career ==
=== Film career ===
Eleanor was a constant presence on films directed by her famous family members. Her contributions to cinema consists of mainly documentaries in which she acted as director, cinematographer, videographer, and writer.

Many of her documentaries consist of behind-the-scenes looks at such films as The Virgin Suicides and Marie Antoinette, which were directed by her daughter Sofia Coppola. In her documentaries, she captured the struggles that endangered her family's films even before they made it onto the big screen. Through her film work, Eleanor Coppola was able to not only illustrate what goes into a film financially, but also capture the emotional toll filmmaking has on the individuals on and off the camera.

==== Apocalypse Now ====
For her early film career, she spent much of her time accompanying her husband on his film shoots. In 1976, she began documenting the making of Apocalypse Now. Her recordings of the hectic film process were later released in her memoir Notes on the Making of Apocalypse Now (1979). The book chronicles such events as the near destruction of the film's production as well as the stress that both cast and crew were suffering from at the time. This would not be the only documentation of the making of Francis Ford Coppola's Apocalypse Now as she decided to film a documentary based on the same movie.

The documentary film Hearts of Darkness: A Filmmaker's Apocalypse was co-directed by Eleanor Coppola, Fax Bahr, and George Hickenlooper. In the film, Eleanor narrated the trials and difficulties surrounding the production of the award-winning film as not only problems arose with the studio but also the cast and crew working at the time. Such events caught on camera include the nervous breakdown of the film's lead Martin Sheen as well as the trouble facing Francis Ford Coppola when an expensive set was destroyed.

The documentary film was released in 1991, which went on to win several awards such as the Emmy for "Outstanding Individual Achievement – Informational Programming – Directing". The film was also nominated for a Directors Guild of America (DGA) Documentary Award in 1991.

==== Feature filmmaking ====
Coppola made her feature film directorial debut with the 2016 romantic comedy Paris Can Wait starring Diane Lane as a wealthy film producer's wife and Arnaud Viard as a charming Frenchman who drives her from Cannes to Paris. The film premiered at the 2016 Toronto International Film Festival.

In 2020, Coppola released her second feature film, Love Is Love Is Love, a set of intertwined love stories about three couples.

=== Writing career ===
Coppola wrote two successful books. Her first book, Notes on the Making of Apocalypse Now, recorded the film's journey from 1976 to 1979. Her detailed note-taking continued in other areas of her life as she collected and wrote about her life's major events. With notes covering a 30-year time span, she went on to write the book Notes on a Life.

==== Notes on a Life ====
The memoir Notes on a Life follows thirty years of Eleanor Coppola's life as she juggles raising children and being there for Francis as he directs films that move the family from place to place. The book consists of short passages from each day beginning with the death of her oldest son Gian-Carlo Coppola at the age of 22 and the birth of her granddaughter Gia just months later. The death of Gian-Carlo Coppola serves as a constant refrain throughout the entire book.

The book is told through her own point of view and although she mentions certain events concerning those around her, such as the controversy surrounding Francis' decision to cast Sofia in The Godfather Part III, her memoir chronicles the inner struggles and problems the family faced at the time.

== Death ==
Coppola died in Rutherford, California, on April 12, 2024, at the age of 87. According to an August 2024 interview with her husband, Francis Ford Coppola, Eleanor had been diagnosed with thymoma in 2010. Her doctor told her that the tumor could be removed by shrinking it during three months of chemotherapy, but she declined the treatment. In the interview, Coppola recounted: "Eleanor said, 'I'm not doing chemo.' She wanted to do what she wanted to do; she made several movies, and ultimately, it just got so big and so painful that she did not want to live anymore."

== Filmography ==
Year	Film	Role(s)
1962	Dementia 13	Assistant art director
1991	Hearts of Darkness: A Filmmaker's Apocalypse	Director
1996	A Visit to China's Miao Country	Director
1998	Making of "The Virgin Suicides"	Director
2002	On the Set of "CQ"	Videographer
2002	Teknolust	Second camera operator
2006	A Million Feet of Film: The Editing of Apocalypse Now	Cinematographer
2006	Heard Any Good Movies Lately?: The Sound Design of Apocalypse Now	Cinematographer
2006	The Birth of 5.1 Sound	Cinematographer
2006	The Music of Apocalypse Now	Cinematographer
2007	Francis Ford Coppola Directs 'John Grisham's The Rainmaker'	Director
2007	Coda: Thirty Years Later	Director, cinematographer, writer
2016	Paris Can Wait	Director, writer
2020	Love Is Love Is Love	Director, writer
2026	Making Marie Antoinette	Director

== Other work ==
The organization Circle of Memory was founded by Eleanor Coppola and other artists to commemorate missing and lost loved ones. Her artwork has been featured in museums and galleries around the world. Eleanor Coppola founded the project in memory of her late son Gian-Carlo Coppola. Eleanor Coppola also designed costumes and stage décor for ODC/Dance in San Francisco. She also managed the Rubicon Estate Winery which her family owns.

== Works ==
- Notes on the Making of Apocalypse Now (1979)
- Notes on a Life (2010)
- Two of Me: Notes of Living and Leaving (2025)

== See also ==
- Coppola family tree
- List of female film and television directors
