= Jason Schwartzman =

American actor and musician (born 1980)

- Schwartzman in 2026
- Born: June 26, 1980 (age 46); Los Angeles, California, U.S.
- Occupations: Actor; musician
- Years active: 1997–present
- Spouse: Brady Cunningham (m. 2009)
- Children: 3
- Parents: Jack Schwartzman (father); Talia Shire (mother)
- Relatives: Coppola family
- Musical career
- Genres: Indie; rock; pop; film score
- Instruments: Vocals; guitar; keyboards; drums
- Years active: 1994–present
- Labels: Young Baby; Coconut
- Formerly of: Phantom Planet

Jason Schwartzman (born June 26, 1980) is an American actor and musician. A member of the Coppola family, Schwartzman made his film debut in Wes Anderson's 1998 film Rushmore, and has since appeared in six other Anderson films: The Darjeeling Limited (2007), Fantastic Mr. Fox (2009), Moonrise Kingdom (2012), The Grand Budapest Hotel (2014), The French Dispatch (2021), and Asteroid City (2023). He also has a co-writing credit on The Darjeeling Limited.

He is known for his roles as Gideon Graves in Scott Pilgrim vs. the World (2010) and Scott Pilgrim Takes Off (2023), and the Spot, whom he voices in Spider-Man: Across the Spider-Verse (2023) and the upcoming Spider-Man: Beyond the Spider-Verse (2027). Schwartzman's other films include Spun (2003), I Heart Huckabees (2004), Marie Antoinette (2006), Funny People (2009), Saving Mr. Banks (2013), Big Eyes (2014), Klaus (2019), The Hunger Games: The Ballad of Songbirds & Snakes (2023), and Queer (2024). He starred in the television series Bored to Death (2009–2011) and appeared in the fourth season of the FX anthology series Fargo (2020). He was an executive producer on the Amazon Prime show Mozart in the Jungle (2014–2018), a series in which he also acted.

Schwartzman has released three albums through his solo musical project, under the name of Coconut Records. He is a founding member and former drummer of the rock band Phantom Planet.

== Early life ==
Jason Schwartzman was born in Los Angeles on June 26, 1980, the son of actress Talia Shire (née Coppola) and film producer Jack Schwartzman. His father is Jewish and his mother is Italian, with Schwartzman describing his ancestry as "half Polish Jewish and half Italian." His younger brother, Robert Schwartzman, is also an actor and musician. His paternal half-siblings are Stephanie and cinematographer John Schwartzman, while his maternal half-brother is Matthew Shire.

As a member of the Coppola family, he is related to many individuals involved in the entertainment industry. He is the nephew of filmmaker Francis Ford Coppola and academic August Coppola; great-nephew of opera conductor Anton Coppola; the maternal cousin of actor Nicolas Cage and filmmakers Sofia Coppola, Roman Coppola, Gia Coppola, and Christopher Coppola; and the grandson of Coppola family matriarch Italia Coppola (née Pennino) and composer Carmine Coppola. He attended Windward School in the Mar Vista neighborhood of Los Angeles.

== Career ==
=== Acting ===
Schwartzman began his acting career in 1998 when, at the age of 18, he starred in Wes Anderson's Rushmore. In 2000, he had a guest role in the short-lived series Freaks and Geeks. In 2001, he starred in CQ, a film by his cousin Roman Coppola. In 2002, he starred in the comedy film Slackers, and in 2003 headlined the drama Spun. He starred in I Heart Huckabees in 2004 and Shopgirl in 2005. He also appeared in various television shows, such as Cracking Up. In 2006, he starred as King Louis XVI in Marie Antoinette under the direction of his cousin Sofia Coppola.

Schwartzman made a cameo appearance as Ringo Starr in the biopic spoof Walk Hard: The Dewey Cox Story. In 2009, he appeared as C-list television star Mark in Funny People. He also voiced Ash Fox in Wes Anderson's animated film Fantastic Mr. Fox, which he called "the best movie I've ever been a part of". He starred in the HBO show Bored to Death as a writer who moonlights as a private detective and puts himself up for hire on Craigslist. In 2009, he starred in The Marc Pease Experience. In 2010, he played Gideon Graves in Scott Pilgrim vs. the World, the film adaptation of the comics by Bryan Lee O'Malley.

In 2011, Schwartzman made a cameo appearance as Vincent van Gogh in the Beastie Boys' short film Fight for Your Right Revisited. In September 2012, Schwartzman was originally going to be cast as the male lead in the DreamWorks animated film Trolls; however, he was replaced by Justin Timberlake. In February 2013, he made a cameo appearance in "Parks and Recreation" Season 5 episodes 15 and 16. In 2013, he cameoed as himself in an episode of the television show Key & Peele. In 2014, he played himself in the Tim & Eric's Bedtime Stories episode "The Endorsement". In 2020, he starred as Italian crime boss Josto Fadda in the fourth season of the FX anthology series Fargo.

In 2023, Schwartzman played a leading role in Wes Anderson's Asteroid City.

=== Music ===
Prior to acting, in 1994, Schwartzman co-founded the rock band Phantom Planet at a Los Angeles Pizza Hut, where he was the drummer and a songwriter. He left the band in May 2003 to focus on his acting career. He appeared in the music video for the rock remix of "It's All About the Benjamins" by Puff Daddy, and contributed to Ben Lee's 2005 album Awake Is the New Sleep. In 2007, he created the indie rock solo act Coconut Records. The first album, Nighttiming, was produced by Michael Einziger and features a cover photo by his cousin Roman Coppola. The album was first released on iTunes on March 20, 2007. It had musical contributions by members of Incubus, as well as appearances by actresses Zooey Deschanel and Kirsten Dunst and Schwartzman's brother Robert. His second album, Davy, was released on iTunes on January 20, 2009. Schwartzman also played the drums on Phoenix's rendition of The Beach Boys' song "Alone on Christmas Day" in 2015. The song was featured in Bill Murray's Netflix special A Very Murray Christmas.

Schwartzman's work has also been featured in many films and television programs. In 2009, he composed the theme song to his HBO series Bored to Death, in which he also starred, under his Coconut Records title. That same year, he contributed to the film score to the film Funny People with composer Michael Andrews. The original soundtrack is downloadable, as well as available in vinyl LP, on Coconut Records' official Cinder Block store. He has also written tracks for Smallville and Slackers. His song "Microphone" was featured in the 2012 coming-of-age comedy LOL.

In 2025, Schwartzman contributed vocals and keys to Ben Kweller’s song "Depression" from the album Cover the Mirrors.

== Personal life ==
Schwartzman married his long-time girlfriend, Brady Cunningham, an art and design director, at their home in the San Fernando Valley on July 11, 2009. Their first child, a daughter, was born in December 2010. Their second daughter was born in June 2014. The pair also have a son.

In 2006, Schwartzman described himself as "basically a vegan". In 2009, he was named one of the "Top 10 Most Stylish Men in America" by GQ magazine. In 2011, he narrated a video titled What to Eat: The Environmental Impacts of Our Food for Farm Sanctuary.

== Filmography ==
Key
†	Denotes films that have not yet been released

=== Film ===
Year	Title	Role	Notes
1998	Rushmore	Max Fischer	
2001	CQ	Felix DeMarco	
2001	Odessa or Bust	The Young Man	Short film
2001	Julius And Friends: Hole In One	Julius (voice)	Short film
2002	Slackers	Ethan Dulles	
2002	Spun	Ross	
2002	Simone	Milton	
2003	Julius And Friends: Yeti, Set, Go	Julius (voice)	Short film
2004	I Heart Huckabees	Albert Markovski	
2005	The Hitchhiker's Guide to the Galaxy	Gag Halfrunt	Uncredited
2005	Bewitched	Ritchie	
2005	Shopgirl	Jeremy	
2006	Marie Antoinette	Louis XVI	
2007	Hotel Chevalier	Jack Whitman	Short film
2007	The Darjeeling Limited	Jack Whitman	Also co-writer (with Wes Anderson and Roman Coppola)
2007	Walk Hard: The Dewey Cox Story	Ringo Starr	Uncredited
2009	Funny People	Mark Taylor Jackson	
2009	The Marc Pease Experience	Marc Pease	
2009	Fantastic Mr. Fox	Ash Fox (voice)	
2010	Scott Pilgrim vs. the World	Gideon Graves	
2010	Scott Pilgrim vs. the Animation	Simon Lee (voice)	Short film
2011	Fight For Your Right Revisited	Vincent van Gogh	Short film
2012	Moonrise Kingdom	Cousin Ben	
2012	Cousin Ben Troop Screening with Jason Schwartzman	Cousin Ben	Short film
2012	A Glimpse Inside the Mind of Charles Swan III	Kirby Star	
2013	Castello Cavalcanti	Jed Cavalcanti	Short film
2013	Saving Mr. Banks	Richard M. Sherman	
2014	Listen Up Philip	Philip Lewis Friedman	
2014	The Grand Budapest Hotel	M. Jean	
2014	Big Eyes	Ruben	
2015	The Overnight	Kurt	
2015	7 Chinese Brothers	Larry	
2015	A Very Murray Christmas	Elliott	
2016	Dreamland	Peter	
2016	My Entire High School Sinking into the Sea	Dash (voice)	
2017	The Polka King	Mickey Pizzazz	
2017	Golden Exits	Buddy	
2018	Isle of Dogs	—N/a	Co-writer (story only, with Wes Anderson, Roman Coppola, and Kunichi Nomura)
2019	Wine Country	Devon	
2019	Between Two Ferns: The Movie	Himself	
2019	Klaus	Jesper (voice)	
2020	Mainstream	Mark Schwartz	
2021	The Sparks Brothers	Himself	Documentary
2021	The French Dispatch	Hermes Jones	Also co-writer (story only, with Wes Anderson, Roman Coppola and Hugo Guinness)
2021	Sing 2	Additional voices	
2022	There There	Lawyer	
2023	Asteroid City	Augie Steenbeck / Jones Hall	
2023	Spider-Man: Across the Spider-Verse	Johnathon Ohnn / The Spot (voice)	
2023	Quiz Lady	Ron Heacock	
2023	The Hunger Games: The Ballad of Songbirds & Snakes	Lucretius "Lucky" Flickerman	
2024	Between the Temples	Ben Gottlieb	Also executive producer
2024	Megalopolis	Jason Zanderz	
2024	Queer	Joe Guidry	
2024	Pavements	Chris Lombardi	
2024	The Last Showgirl	Director	
2025	Oh. What. Fun.	Doug Austin	
2026	Artificial		
2027	Gatto	Vivaldi (voice)	Post-production
2027	Spider-Man: Beyond the Spider-Verse †	Johnathon Ohnn / The Spot (voice)	In production
TBA	The Thing That Hurts †		Post-production

=== Television ===
Year	Title	Role	Notes
1998	Sabrina, the Teenage Witch	Himself (Phantom Planet drummer)	Episode: "And the Sabrina Goes to..."
2000	Freaks and Geeks	Howie Gelfand	Episode: "Carded and Discarded"
2000	Get Real	Himself	Episode: "Falling From Grace"
2004	Cracking Up	Ben Baxter	7 episodes
2005	The X's	Brandon (voice)	Episode: "Secret Agent Manual / The Spy Who Liked Me"
2009–2011	Bored to Death	Jonathan Ames	24 episodes
2011	Sesame Street	Himself	1 episode
2013	Parks and Recreation	Dennis Lerpiss	2 episodes
2013	Out There	Benjamin Brent / Cedric (voices)	2 episodes
2013	Drunk History	Ralph Nader	Episode: "Detroit"
2013	Key & Peele	Himself	Episode: "Boarding Order"
2013	Comedy Bang! Bang!	Himself	Episode: "Jason Schwartzman Wears a Striped Shirt & High Top Sneakers"
2013	Ghost Ghirls	Brad Holmes	Episode: "Comedy of Terrors"
2014	Tim & Eric's Bedtime Stories	Jason Schwartzman	Episode: "The Endorsement"
2014–2016	Mozart in the Jungle	Bradford Sharp	8 episodes; also writer and producer
2015	Wet Hot American Summer: First Day of Camp	Greg	7 episodes
2015–2016	Blunt Talk	Duncan Adler	7 episodes
2017	Wet Hot American Summer: Ten Years Later	Greg	4 episodes
2017–2018	Neo Yokio	Arcangelo Corelli (voice)	7 episodes
2020	Medical Police	The Goldfinch	4 episodes
2020	Fargo	Josto Fadda	10 episodes
2021–2022	Duncanville	Uncle Sam (voice)	2 episodes
2022	The Righteous Gemstones	Thaniel Block	3 episodes
2022	I Love That for You	Ethan	2 episodes
2023	Digman!	Roberto (voice)	Episode: "Et Tu"
2023	I Think You Should Leave with Tim Robinson	Man at Party	Episode: "DON'T JUST SAY 'RELAX,' ACTUALLY RELAX"
2023	Ten Year Old Tom	(voice)	Episode: "The Henderson Consulting Squirrels/Rick's Boat"
2023	Scott Pilgrim Takes Off	Gideon Graves / Gordon Goose (voice)	6 episodes
2023	Fargo	Narrator (voice)	Episode: "The Tiger"; uncredited
2025	Mountainhead	Hugo Van Yalk	Television film
2025	Talamasca: The Secret Order	Burton	Episode: "We Watch and We Are Always There"
2026	Kevin	Kevin (voice)	8 episodes

=== Video games ===
Year	Title	Role
2021	The Artful Escape	Zomm/Terminal (voice)

=== Composer ===
Year	Title	Notes
2002	Orange County	Song: "California"
2002	Smallville	Song: "Lonely Day"
2002	Slackers	Songs: "Oh Angela" and "Ethan's Song"
2004	Cracking Up	Theme music
2006	The O.C.	Song: "California"
2008	Cloverfield	Song: "West Coast"
2009	Bored to Death	Theme music
2009	Funny People	Soundtrack
2012	Here (short film)	Co-composer, with Woody Jackson
2012	Goats	Co-composer, with Woody Jackson
2012	LOL	Song: "Microphone"
2013	Palo Alto	Song: "Is This Sound Okay?"

== Discography ==
=== Studio albums ===
Details	Peak chart positions	
Details	US Heat	US Indie
Nighttiming: Released: March 20, 2007; Label: Young Baby Records	—	—
Davy: Released: January 20, 2009; Label: Young Baby Records	10	36
Goats Original Soundtrack: Released: August 7, 2012; Label: Young Baby Records	—	—

=== Singles ===
- "Microphone" (2008)
- "Bored to Death" (2010) – theme of the show

=== Other appearances ===
- "West Coast" is played in the movie Cloverfield during the party scene
- "Summer Day" is included on Music from and Inspired by Spider-Man 3
- "Wires", "I Am Young", and "Nighttiming" are included on Funny People: Original Motion Picture Soundtrack (2009)
- "It's Christmas" is included on the digital-only promotional release The Christmas Gig (2010) released by Target
- "West Coast" appears in the end of The O.C. season 4, episode 10
- "Is This Sound Okay?" appears in Palo Alto

== Accolades ==
Awards and Nominations received by Jason Schwartzman
Year (Note: Indicates the year of ceremony.)	Organizations	Category	Nominated work	Result	Ref.
2024	The Astra TV Awards	Best Supporting Actor in a Limited Series or TV Movie	Quiz Lady	Nominated	
2012	Boston Society of Film Critics Awards	Best Cast	Moonrise Kingdom	Nominated (Note: Shared with Bob Balaban, Jared Gilman, Kara Hayward, Lucas Hedges, Harvey Keitel, Frances McDormand, Bill Murray, Edward Norton, Tilda Swinton, and Bruce Willis.)	
2013	Central Ohio Film Critics Association Awards	Best Ensemble Cast	Moonrise Kingdom	Won	
2015	Central Ohio Film Critics Association Awards	Best Ensemble Cast	The Grand Budapest Hotel	Won (Note: Shared with F. Murray Abraham, Mathieu Amalric, Adrien Brody, Willem Dafoe, Ralph Fiennes, Jeff Goldblum, Harvey Keitel, Jude Law, Florian Lukas, Bill Murray, Edward Norton, Tony Revolori, Saoirse Ronan, Léa Seydoux, Tilda Swinton, Tom Wilkinson, and Owen Wilson.)	
1999	Chicago Film Critics Association Awards	Most Promising Actor	Rushmore	Nominated	
2000	Chlotrudis Awards	Best Actor	Rushmore	Nominated	
2014	Detroit Film Critics Society Awards	Best Ensemble	The Grand Budapest Hotel	Won	
2014	Florida Film Critics Circle Awards	Best Ensemble	The Grand Budapest Hotel	Won	
2015	Georgia Film Critics Association Awards	Best Ensemble	The Grand Budapest Hotel	Won	
2015	Gold Derby Awards	Best Ensemble Cast	The Grand Budapest Hotel	Nominated	
2020	Gold Derby Awards	Ensemble of the Decade	The Grand Budapest Hotel	Runner-up	
2012	Gotham Awards	Best Ensemble Performance	Moonrise Kingdom	Nominated	
2024	Hawaii Film Critics Society Awards	Best Vocal/Motion-Capture Performance	Spider-Man: Across the Spider-Verse	Nominated	
2019	Hawaii Film Critics Society Awards	Best Original Screenplay	Isle of Dogs	Nominated (Note: Shared the nomination with Wes Anderson, Roman Coppola, and Kunichi Nomura.)	
2019	Humanitas Prize	Family Feature Film	Isle of Dogs	Nominated	
2021	Indiana Film Journalists Association Awards	Best Original Screenplay	The French Dispatch	Nominated (Note: Shared the nomination with Wes Anderson, Roman Coppola, and Hugo Guinness.)	
1999	Lone Star Film & Television Awards	Best Actor	Rushmore	Won	
2007	New York Film Critics Online Awards	Best Screenplay	The Darjeeling Limited	Won	
2022	North Dakota Film Society Awards	Best Screenplay	The French Dispatch	Nominated	
1999	Online Film & Television Association Awards	Best Breakthrough Performance: Male	Rushmore	Won	
2014	Online Film & Television Association Awards	Best Music, Adapted Song ("Let's Go Fly a Kite")	Saving Mr. Banks	Nominated (Note: Shared the nomination with B. J. Novak, Emma Thompson, Bradley Whitford, and the Sherman Brothers (Richard M. & Robert B.).)	
2012	Phoenix Film Critics Society Awards	Best Acting Ensemble	Moonrise Kingdom	Won	
2013	Phoenix Film Critics Society Awards	Best Acting Ensemble	Saving Mr. Banks	Nominated (Note: Shared the nomination with Kathy Baker, Annie Rose Buckley, Colin Farrell, Paul Giamatti, Rachel Griffiths, Tom Hanks, B. J. Novak, Melanie Paxson, Emma Thompson, Ronan Vibert, Bradley Whitford, and Ruth Wilson.)	
2014	Phoenix Film Critics Society Awards	Best Acting Ensemble	The Grand Budapest Hotel	Nominated	
2014	San Diego Film Critics Society Awards	Best Ensemble	The Grand Budapest Hotel	Nominated	
2005	Satellite Awards	Best Supporting Actor — Musical or Comedy	Shopgirl	Nominated	
2011	Scream Awards	Best Villain	Scott Pilgrim vs. the World	Nominated (Note: Shared the nomination with Satya Bhabha, Chris Evans, Brandon Routh, Keita Saitô, Shôta Saitô, and Mae Whitman.)	
2015	Screen Actors Guild Awards	Outstanding Performance by a Cast in a Motion Picture	The Grand Budapest Hotel	Nominated	
2014	Southeastern Film Critics Association Awards	Best Ensemble Cast	The Grand Budapest Hotel	Won	
2012	Southeastern Film Critics Association Awards	Best Ensemble Cast	Moonrise Kingdom	Nominated	
1999	Teen Choice Awards	Choice Hissy Fit	Rushmore	Nominated	
1999	Teen Choice Awards	Choice Movie Breakout	Rushmore	Nominated	
2020	Visual Effects Society Awards	Outstanding Animated Character	Klaus	Nominated (Note: Shared the nomination with other languages' "Jesper" voice actors: Alfredo Cassano, Maxime Delalande, and Yoshimichi Tamura.)	
2014	Voice Arts Awards	Outstanding Audiobook Narration — Short Story Anthology	"One More Thing"	Nominated (Note: Shared the nomination with Lena Dunham, Jenna Fischer, Mindy Kaling, B. J. Novak, Katy Perry, and Rainn Wilson.)	
2014	Washington D.C. Area Film Critics Association Awards	Best Acting Ensemble	The Grand Budapest Hotel	Nominated	
2022	Writers Guild of America Awards	Best Original Screenplay	The French Dispatch	Nominated	
1999	YoungStar Awards	Best Performance by a Young Actor in a Comedy Film	Rushmore	Won	
