= August Coppola =

American academic (1934–2009)

- Born: August Floyd Coppola; February 16, 1934; Hartford, Connecticut, U.S.
- Died: October 27, 2009 (aged 75); Los Angeles, California, U.S.
- Education: UCLA; Hofstra University; Occidental College
- Occupations: Educator, author, film executive
- Spouses: Joy Vogelsang (m. 1960; div. 1976) Marie Thenevin (m. 1981; div. 1986) Martine Chevallier (m. 1996)
- Children: Marc; Christopher; Nicolas
- Parents: Carmine Coppola (father); Italia Pennino (mother)
- Family: Coppola family

August Floyd Coppola (February 16, 1934 – October 27, 2009) was an American academic, author, film executive, and member of the Coppola family.

== Early life and family ==
August Coppola was the son of composer and flautist Carmine Coppola (1910–1991) and Italia Pennino (1912–2004), a lyricist and matriarch of the Coppola family. His uncle was composer Anton Coppola. His siblings are film director Francis Ford Coppola and actress Talia Shire. Among his nieces and nephews are director Sofia Coppola and actor Jason Schwartzman. His children are actor Nicolas Cage, radio DJ Marc Coppola, and director Christopher Coppola.

== Education and work ==
Coppola received an undergraduate degree at UCLA and a graduate degree at Hofstra University, from which his thesis, Ernest Hemingway: The Problem of In Our Time, was published in 1956. He earned his doctorate at Occidental College in 1960. Coppola taught comparative literature at Cal State Long Beach in the 1960s and '70s and served as a trustee of the California State University system before moving to San Francisco in 1984. He then served as Dean of Creative Arts at San Francisco State University. In that role, he earned a reputation for championing the arts on the campus and in the community and for promoting diversity within the student body of the arts school.

Coppola also worked in film like many other members of his family. He was an executive at American Zoetrope, his brother Francis Ford Coppola's film studio, where he was involved in reviving Abel Gance's Napoléon with a new score by his father. Coppola founded and presided over the San Francisco Film and Video Arts Commission and, in 1986, served on the jury of the 36th Berlin International Film Festival. He also held the positions of chairman and CEO of Education First!, an organization dedicated to seeking Hollywood studio support for educational programs.

Coppola also advocated for art appreciation among the visually impaired. He is credited as the creator of the Tactile Dome—a lightless maze that requires visitors to pass through using only the sense of touch—at the San Francisco Exploratorium. In 1972, Coppola opened the AudioVision Workshop with colleague Gregory Frazier, which employed Frazier's process of audio recording descriptions of film and theater action for the benefit of visually impaired audiences.

Additionally, Coppola authored the romantic novel The Intimacy in 1978.

== Personal life ==
Coppola married German-American dancer Joy Vogelsang (1935–2021) in 1960. They had three sons: Marc, Christopher, and Nicolas. Coppola and Vogelsang divorced in 1976; she died in 2021. He married Marie Thenevin on April 16, 1981. That marriage ended in 1986. His last marriage was to Martine Chevallier, an actress with the Comédie-Française in Paris. Coppola's final home was in Los Angeles, where he died of a heart attack on October 27, 2009, at age 75.

== Legacy ==
The 150-seat August Coppola Theater on the San Francisco State University campus is named in his honor. Francis Ford Coppola dedicated his 1983 film Rumble Fish to him.

Nicolas Cage partially based his idea for the film The Sorcerer's Apprentice (2010) and his character Balthazar on his father August Coppola. The closing credits read "With Memories of Dr. August Coppola".

== See also ==
- Coppola family tree
