= Thomas Mars =

French singer (born 1976)

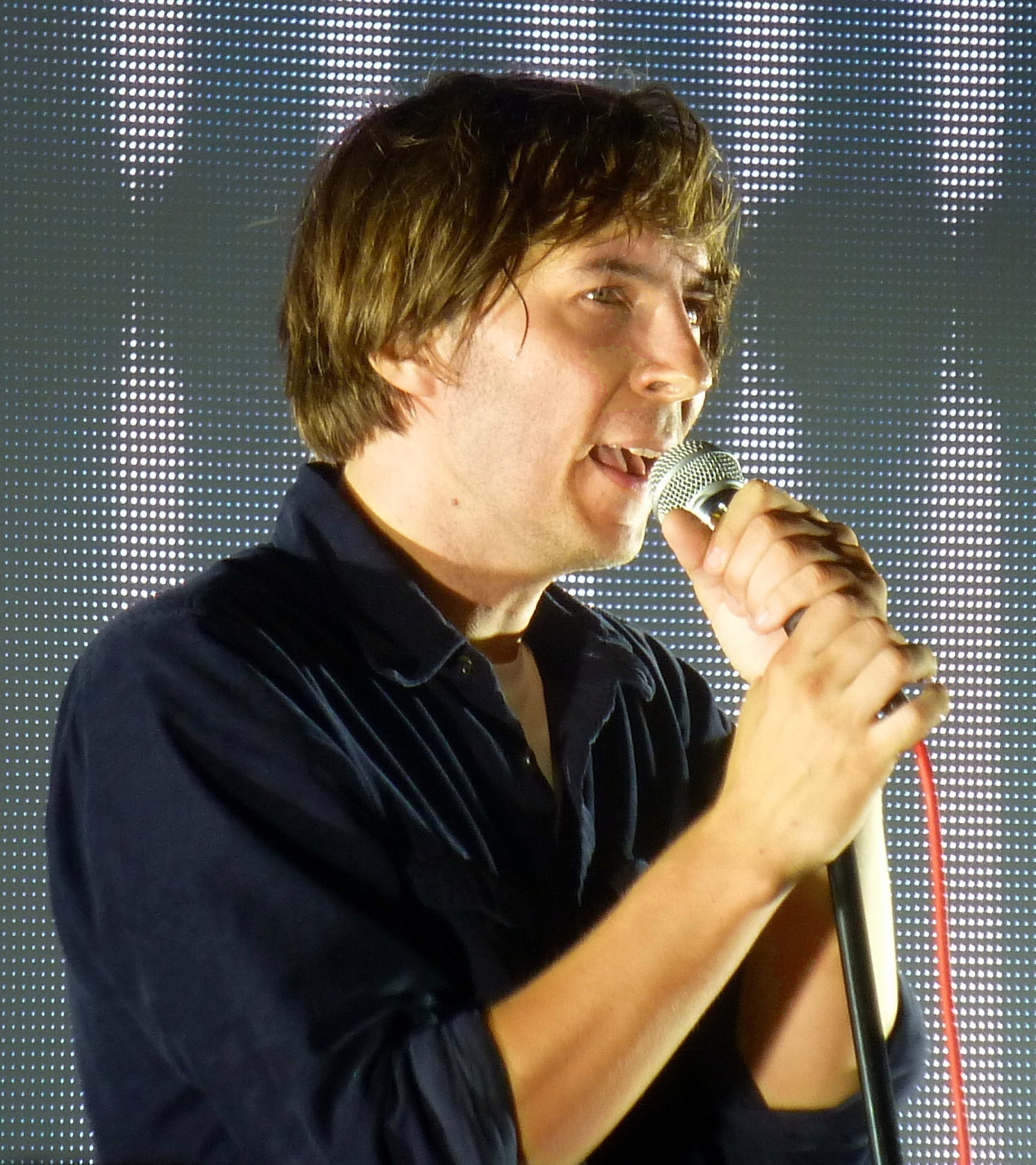
- Mars in 2014
- Born: Thomas Pablo Croquet; 21 November 1976 (age 49); Versailles, France
- Other name: Gordon Tracks
- Occupation: Singer
- Spouse: Sofia Coppola (m. 2011)
- Children: 2, including Romy Mars
- Relatives: Coppola family (by marriage)
- Musical career
- Genres: Indie pop
- Instruments: Vocals; drums
- Years active: 1999–present
- Member of: Phoenix

Thomas Pablo Croquet (born 21 November 1976), known professionally as Thomas Mars, is a French musician and the lead singer of the indie pop band Phoenix.

== Early life ==
Thomas Pablo Croquet was born on 21 November 1976 in Versailles. He was originally inspired to learn English by his uncle, Horst.

Croquet formed the band Phoenix with schoolfriends Chris Mazzalai and Deck d'Arcy. Mazzalai's older brother, Laurent Brancowitz, also joined the band after the breakup of Darlin'. Croquet says that he "destroyed every single other option that would lead me to any potential career other than music", attending college for only four days, studying economics.

== Career ==
Croquet is the frontman of the band Phoenix, which formed in 1995. He adopted a stage name, Thomas Mars, along with other bandmates in order to "sound cooler". In an interview, the band's bassist Deck D'Arcy said that he and Mars started playing music when they were around 11 years old. The band eventually became a full-time profession for Mars following his dropping out of college. The band pressed 500 copies of a single on their own label before being signed to Paris-based label, Source Records.

Mars wrote and produced Phoenix's first charting single in France, "Too Young", which peaked at number 97. Eventually Phoenix's first studio album, United was released in 2000, shipping 150,000 units worldwide. The band has released seven albums and won a Grammy Award in 2010.

Under the pseudonym Gordon Tracks, Mars co-wrote, performed vocals and drummed on the 2000 Air song "Playground Love" from The Virgin Suicides, which reached No. 25 on the UK singles chart.

== Personal life ==
In 2011, Croquet married filmmaker Sofia Coppola at Palazzo Margherita in Bernalda. The couple met in 1999 on the set of The Virgin Suicides, which she directed and he contributed music to under the pseudonym Gordon Tracks. They have two daughters together, one of whom is American actress Romy.

The German literary critic Hellmuth Karasek was his uncle.

As of 2018, Croquet lives in New York City with his wife and children. He travels to Paris monthly and has a residence there. The rest of his Phoenix bandmates reside in France.
