= Romy Mars =

American entertainer (born 2006)

- Born: Romy Madison Croquet; November 28, 2006 (age 19)
- Occupations: Actress, singer
- Years active: 2020–present
- Parents: Thomas Mars (father); Sofia Coppola (mother)
- Relatives: Coppola family

Romy Madison Croquet (born November 28, 2006), better known by her professional name Romy Mars, is an American entertainer. A member of the Coppola family, she is a daughter of filmmaker Sofia Coppola and musician Thomas Mars.

== Life and career ==
Romy is the oldest daughter born to Sofia Coppola and Thomas Mars. She was raised out of the public eye and made her first modeling appearance for Marc Jacobs in 2020. In 2023, when she was 16, she went viral for a soon-deleted TikTok video in which she tries to make pasta and says she was grounded for trying to use her father's credit card to charter a helicopter to have dinner with an out-of-state friend. In 2025, Mars went viral for posting a TikTok with Jacob Elordi.

Mars began writing music when she was 12. She released her first pop singles, "Stuck Up" and "From a Distance", on May 22, 2024.

Mars appeared in a small role as a reporter in her grandfather Francis Ford Coppola's film Megalopolis, which premiered at the 2024 Cannes Film Festival. She played the student Kayla in the FX comedy series English Teacher later that year.

On May 9, 2025, she released the single "A-Lister". The music video for the song is directed by her mother.

In October 2026, Mars released "The Rage" which was written and produced with Claud and Josh Mehling.

On November 11, 2026, she released her fourth single, "Tell Him". The track was produced by Julian Dobson, who also produced her 2025 single "Ego".

== Discography ==
- 2024 - Stuck Up – EP
- 2025 - A-Lister – single
- 2025 - Ego – single
- 2026 - The Rage – single
- 2026 - Tell Him – single

== Filmography ==
Film

- Megalopolis (2024)

Television

- English Teacher (2024)

Music videos

- "A-Lister" (2025)
