= Talia Shire =

American actress (born 1946)

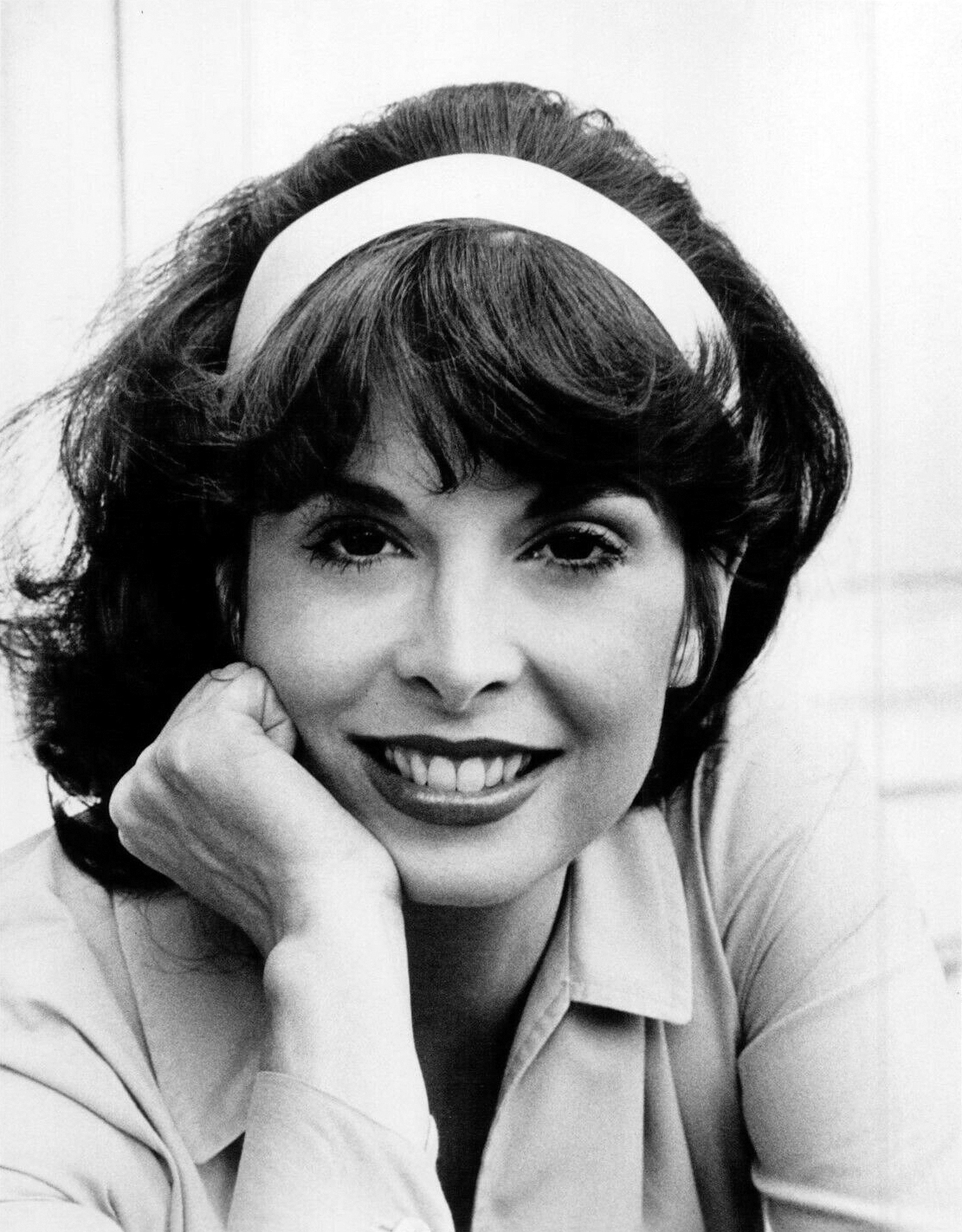
- Shire in 1977
- Born: Talia Rose Coppola; April 25, 1946 (age 80); New York City, U.S.
- Occupation: Actress
- Years active: 1968–present
- Spouses: David Shire (m. 1970; div. 1980); Jack Schwartzman (m. 1980; died 1994)
- Children: 3, including Jason and Robert Schwartzman
- Parents: Carmine Coppola (father); Italia Pennino (mother)
- Family: Coppola

Talia Rose Shire (/ˈʃaɪr/; née Coppola; born April 25, 1946) is an American actress and member of the Coppola family. She is best known for her roles as Connie Corleone in The Godfather trilogy (1972–1990) and Adrian Pennino Balboa in the Rocky series (1976–1990). For her work in The Godfather Part II (1974) and Rocky (1976), Shire was nominated for two Academy Awards for Best Supporting Actress and Best Actress, respectively, while also receiving a nomination for the Golden Globe Award for Best Actress in a Drama for her role in Rocky.

== Early life and family ==
Shire was born Talia Rose Coppola in the Woodside section of Queens, New York, in 1946. Her paternal grandparents came to the United States from Bernalda, Basilicata. Her maternal grandfather, popular Italian composer Francesco Pennino, emigrated from Naples, Italy.

Shire is the only daughter of Italia (née Pennino) and arranger/composer Carmine Coppola. She is the sister of director/producer Francis Ford Coppola and academic August Coppola, the aunt of actor Nicolas Cage and director Sofia Coppola, and the niece of composer and conductor Anton Coppola.

Her family moved to Lake Success, Long Island, New York, where she lived during her high school years.

She has three children. Her son Matthew Orlando Shire, an accomplished TV writer and film producer, is from her first marriage, to composer David Shire. Her other sons, actors/musicians Jason and Robert, are from her second marriage, to film producer Jack Schwartzman.

== Career ==
Shire portrayed Connie Corleone in The Godfather and its sequels and was nominated for the Academy Award for Best Supporting Actress for her performance in The Godfather Part II (1974). For her portrayal of Adrianna Pennino, the love interest of Rocky Balboa in Rocky (1976), she won the New York Film Critics Circle Award for Best Supporting Actress, the National Board of Review Award for Best Supporting Actress, and was nominated for both the Golden Globe Award for Best Actress in a Drama and the Academy Award for Best Actress. In addition to reprising her Adrianna Pennino role in four Rocky sequels, Shire has appeared in such films as Kiss the Bride (2002), I Heart Huckabees (2004), and Homo Erectus (2007).

== Filmography ==
Films
Year	Title	Role	Notes
1968	The Wild Racers	1st Girlfriend	As Talia Coppola
1970	The Dunwich Horror	Nurse Cora	Credited as Talia Coppola
1970	The Butchers	Sandy	Credited as Talia Coppola
1971	Gas-s-s-s	Coralee	Credited as Talia Coppola
1971	The Christian Licorice Store	Last Party Guest	Credited as Talia Coppola
1972	The Godfather	Connie Corleone	
1972	The Outside Man	Make-Up Girl	
1974	The Godfather Part II	Connie Corleone	
1976	Rocky	Adrianna "Adrian" Pennino	
1979	Old Boyfriends	Dianne Cruise	
1979	Prophecy	Maggie Verne	
1979	Rocky II	Adrianna "Adrian" Pennino	
1980	Windows	Emily Hollander	
1982	Rocky III	Adrianna "Adrian" Balboa	
1985	Rocky IV	Adrianna "Adrian" Balboa	
1986	Rad	Mrs. Jones	
1986	Hyper Sapien: People from Another Star	Dr. Tedra Rosen	
1989	New York Stories	Charlotte	Segment: Life Without Zoe
1990	Rocky V	Adrianna "Adrian" Balboa	
1990	The Godfather Part III	Connie Corleone	
1991	Cold Heaven	Sister Martha	
1992	Bed & Breakfast	Claire	
1993	Deadfall	Sam	
1997	A River Made to Drown In	Jaime's Mother	
1997	She's So Lovely	Restaurant Owner	Uncredited
1998	Divorce: A Contemporary Western	Lacey	
1998	Can I Play?	Robert	Short film
1998	Caminho dos Sonhos	Ida Stern	
1998	The Landlady	Melanie Leroy	
1999	Lured Innocence	Martha Chambers	
1999	Palmer's Pick Up	Mr. Price	
1999	The Black and the White	Tulip Clayton	
2000	The Visit	Parole Board Member Marilyn	
2001	The Whole Shebang	Countess Bazinni	
2002	Kiss the Bride	Irena Sposato	
2003	Family Tree	Patricia	Short film
2003	Dunsmore	Mildred Green	
2004	I Heart Huckabees	Mrs. Silver	
2005	Pomegranate	Aunt Sophia	
2006	Rocky Balboa	Adrianna "Adrian" Balboa	Archival footage
2007	Homo Erectus	Ishbo's Mother	
2008	Looking for Palladin	Rosario	
2008	Dim Sum Funeral	Viola Gruber	
2008	My Father's Will		aka My Secret Billionaire
2009	The Deported	Dina	
2010	Minkow	Carole Minkow	
2010	Scratching the Surface	Mrs. Shifman	
2011	The Return of Joe Rich	Gloria Neiderman	
2013	Palo Alto	Mrs. Ganem	
2016	Dreamland	Victoria	
2019	Working Man	Iola Parkes	
2024	Megalopolis	Constance Crassus Catilina	
2025	Nonnas	Teresa	
TBA	That's Amore! †		Post-production

Television
Year	Title	Role	Notes
1975	Foster and Laurie	Adelaide Laurie	CBS Television film
1976	Doctors' Hospital		Episode: "Lullabye"
1976	Rich Man, Poor Man	Teresa Santoro	ABC Television miniseries
1977	Kill Me If You Can	Rosalie Asher	NBC Television film
1977	The Godfather Saga	Connie Corleone	NBC Television film
1978	Daddy, I Don't Like It Like This	Carol Agnelli	CBS Television film
1987	Blood Vows: The Story of a Mafia Wife	Gina	NBC Television film
1987	Faerie Tale Theatre	Wilma Van Winkle	Episode: "Rip Van Winkle"
1991	Mark Twain and Me	Jean Clemens	Television film
1992	For Richer, for Poorer	Millie Katourian	HBO Television film
1992	CBS Schoolbreak Special	Mrs. Leland	Episode: "Please, God, I'm Only Seventeen"
1993	Chantilly Lace	Maggie	Showtime Television film
1995	Blossom	Herself	Episode: "A Star Is Bared"
1997	Born Into Exile	Donna Nolan	NBC Television film
2007	Blue Smoke	Bianca Hale	Lifetime Television film
2007	Christmas at Cadillac Jack's	Peg	Television film
2017	Kingdom	Annette Kulina	Episodes: "Old Pueblo" and "Cactus"
2018	Grace and Frankie	Teddie	Episodes: "The Pop-Ups" and "The Hinge"
2018	Girlfriends' Guide to Divorce	Meryl Frumpkis	Episode: "Rule #149: Don't Eat the Yellow Snow"
2024	Abbott Elementary	Teresa Schemmenti	Episode: "Winter Break"

== Accolades ==
Year	Award	Category	Nominated work	Result	Ref.
1975	Academy Awards	Best Supporting Actress	The Godfather Part II	Nominated	
1976	National Board of Review Awards	Best Supporting Actress	Rocky	Won	
1977	Academy Awards	Best Actress	Rocky	Nominated	
1977	Golden Globes	Best Actress in a Motion Picture – Drama	Rocky	Nominated	
1977	New York Film Critics Circle Awards	Best Supporting Actress	Rocky	Won	
1977	National Society of Film Critics Awards	Best Supporting Actress	Rocky	Runner-up	
1998	Tony Awards	Best Play	Golden Child	Nominated	
