= Christopher Coppola =

American film director and producer

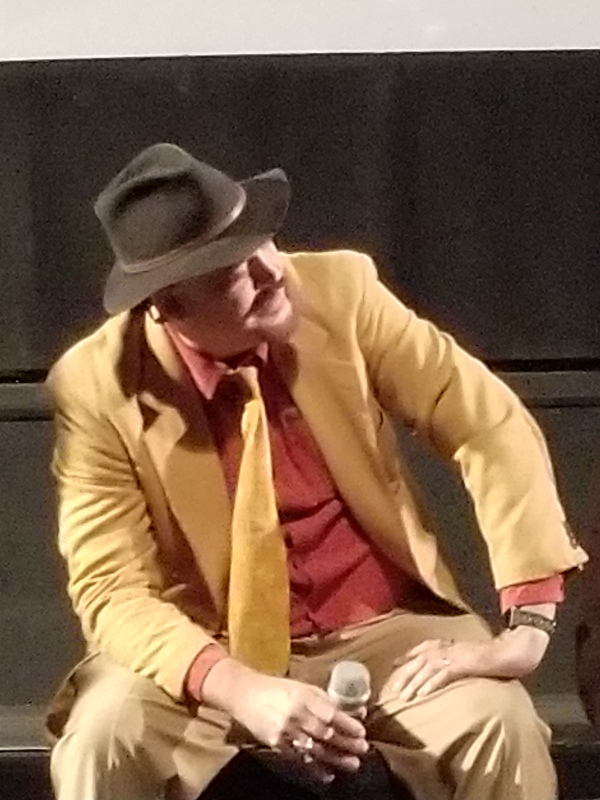
- Born: Christopher R. Coppola; January 25, 1962 (age 64); Los Angeles County, California, U.S.
- Education: University of Redlands, San Francisco Art Institute
- Occupations: Film director, producer
- Spouse: Alba Metaponte
- Children: 2
- Father: August Coppola
- Relatives: Coppola family

Christopher R. Coppola (born January 25, 1962) is an American filmmaker and member of the Coppola family.

== Early life ==
Coppola was born in Los Angeles County, California. His father, August Coppola, was a professor of literature, while his mother, Joy Vogelsang, was a dancer and choreographer. He is a nephew of Francis Ford Coppola and Talia Shire. Coppola studied music composition at the University of Redlands from 1979 to 1980; he also attended San Francisco Art Institute, earning a BFA in film in 1985.

== Career ==
Coppola began filmmaking at an early age and has directed eight feature films and a number of television shows. He premiered his feature film Creature of the Sunnyside Up Trailer Park at the 2003 Toronto International Film Festival. His television show Biker Chef premiered at the 2004 Oldenburg Film Festival in Germany.

Coppola is the president of Christopher R. Coppola Productions (CRC Productions). In 2006, Coppola launched the digital film festival PAH-FEST (Project Accessible Hollywood) in New Mexico. In addition to New Mexico, Coppola has taken PAH-FEST across the US, as well as Germany and Slovenia. Coppola's CRC Productions is also developing and producing content for alternative distribution and interactive platforms.

In April 2013, Coppola was appointed by Governor Jerry Brown to serve on the California Arts Council. He also taught at San Francisco Art Institute starting in 2013, as tenure-track faculty.

== Personal life ==
Through his father, Coppola is the nephew of Francis Ford Coppola and Talia Shire, as well as the cousin of Sofia Coppola, Robert Schwartzman, and Jason Schwartzman. Coppola's two brothers are Nicolas Cage and Marc Coppola.

== Filmography ==
=== Director ===
- Dracula's Widow (1988)
- Deadfall (1993)
- Gunfight at Red Dog Corral (1993)
- Clockmaker (1998)
- The Gunfighter (1999)
- Palmer's Pick Up (1999)
- Bel Air (2000)
- G-Men from Hell (2000)
- The Creature of the Sunny Side Up Trailer Park (2004)
- From Darkness to Light (2011)
- Sacred Blood (2015)
- Universe at Play (2017) (VR)
- Torch (2017)
- Paradise Found (TBA)

=== Producer ===
- Deadfall (1993) (co-producer)
- The Creature of the Sunny Side Up Trailer Park (2004)

== See also ==
- Coppola family tree
