= Jack Schwartzman =

American film producer

- Born: July 22, 1932; New York City, New York, U.S.
- Died: June 15, 1994 (aged 61); Los Angeles, California, U.S.
- Occupation: Film producer
- Years active: 1971–1994
- Spouses: Judith Deborah Feldman (m. 1958; div. 1980) Talia Shire (m. 1980)
- Children: 4, including John, Jason, and Robert
- Relatives: Coppola family (by marriage)

Jack Schwartzman (July 22, 1932 – June 15, 1994) was an American film producer.

== Early life ==
Jack Schwartzman was born on July 22, 1932, in New York City. He had a brother, Leonard Schwartzman, who became a physician. He was of Ashkenazi Jewish descent.

== Career ==
Schwartzman was an entertainment attorney (clients included director Hal Ashby) and in the late 1970s was an executive at Lorimar Films. Schwartzman later became a film producer; among the films he produced were the 1983 non-Eon James Bond film Never Say Never Again, starring Sean Connery and the 1986 film Rad, starring Bill Allen. His production company, Taliafilm, was named after second wife, actress Talia Shire.

== Personal life ==
Schwartzman and his first wife, Judith Deborah Feldman (m. February 5, 1958 – August 11, 1980; divorced) had two children, John Schwartzman and Stephanie. Schwartzman and his second wife, actress Talia Shire had two sons, Jason Schwartzman and Robert Coppola Schwartzman. Jack Schwartzman died of pancreatic cancer on June 15, 1994, in Los Angeles, California.

== See also ==
- Coppola family tree
