= Gian-Carlo Coppola =

American film producer and actor (1963–1986)

- Born: September 17, 1963; Los Angeles, California, U.S.
- Died: May 26, 1986 (aged 22); Annapolis, Maryland, U.S.
- Occupations: Film producer; actor
- Partner: Jacqui de la Fontaine (engaged)
- Children: Gia Coppola
- Parents: Francis Ford Coppola (father); Eleanor Neil (mother)
- Relatives: Coppola family

Gian-Carlo Coppola (September 17, 1963 – May 26, 1986) was an American film producer and actor. A child of the Coppola family associated with the film industry, he was the oldest child of Eleanor and Francis Ford Coppola, and elder brother to Roman and Sofia Coppola.

== Early life ==
Coppola was born on September 17, 1963, in Los Angeles, California. His mother was set decorator/artist Eleanor Coppola (née Neil) and film director Francis Ford Coppola. As the eldest Coppola sibling, he was the older brother of Roman and Sofia.

== Career ==
Coppola began his professional film-making career at the age of sixteen, working closely with his father. Like his brother and sister, Coppola—known to his family and friends as Gio—often featured in his father's movies as background characters (The Godfather, The Conversation, Apocalypse Now Redux and Rumble Fish), later acting as associate producer for Rumble Fish and The Outsiders, and second unit director on The Cotton Club.

In The Godfather, he appeared with his brother Roman as the two sons of Robert Duvall's Tom Hagen character, and they can be seen during the street fight and Vito Corleone's funeral right behind Duvall and Al Pacino.

During the pre-production phase of Gardens of Stone, Coppola was given the responsibility of filming the rehearsals and supervising the electronic cinema staff. There was also potential for Coppola to intern with director Steven Spielberg to work on the television series Amazing Stories before his death. Director Penny Marshall had also hired him to work on the second unit for her feature film Jumpin' Jack Flash.

== Death ==
Gian-Carlo Coppola was killed in a speedboating incident on Memorial Day, 1986, aged 22, in Annapolis, Maryland. Griffin O'Neal, who was piloting the boat, had attempted to pass between two slow-moving boats, unaware that the boats were connected by a towline. While O'Neal barely had time to duck, Coppola was struck and killed. Before the incident, O'Neal was being directed by Francis Ford Coppola in Gardens of Stone and was subsequently replaced. O'Neal was later charged with manslaughter. He ultimately pleaded guilty to the lesser charge of "negligent operation of a boat", was fined $200 and sentenced to 18 months' probation in 1987. He eventually received an 18-day jail sentence for not performing 400 hours of community service as ordered.

== Posthumous ==
At the time of Coppola's death, his fiancée Jacqui de la Fontaine was two months pregnant with their only daughter, Gian-Carla "Gia" Coppola (born January 1, 1987). Gia Coppola became a writer–director with Palo Alto (2013).

Francis Ford Coppola subsequently dedicated 1988's Tucker: The Man and His Dream to his son. A scene in his 2011 film Twixt shows the death of a character as being similar to his son's death. Eleanor Coppola's touring art installation, Circle of Memory, commemorates the life of her elder son, and has been exhibited in San Diego, Oakland, Santa Fe, Montpellier, Salzburg, Stockholm, and Oslo.

== Selected filmography ==
- The Godfather (1972) – Baptism Observer (uncredited)
- The Conversation (1974) – Boy in Church (uncredited)
- The Outsiders (1983) – Associate producer
- Rumble Fish (1983) – Cousin James; associate producer (final film role)
- The Cotton Club (1984) – Second unit director (final film)
- Apocalypse Now Redux (2001) – Gilles de Marais (posthumous release; archival footage)
