= Phoenix discography =

Discography

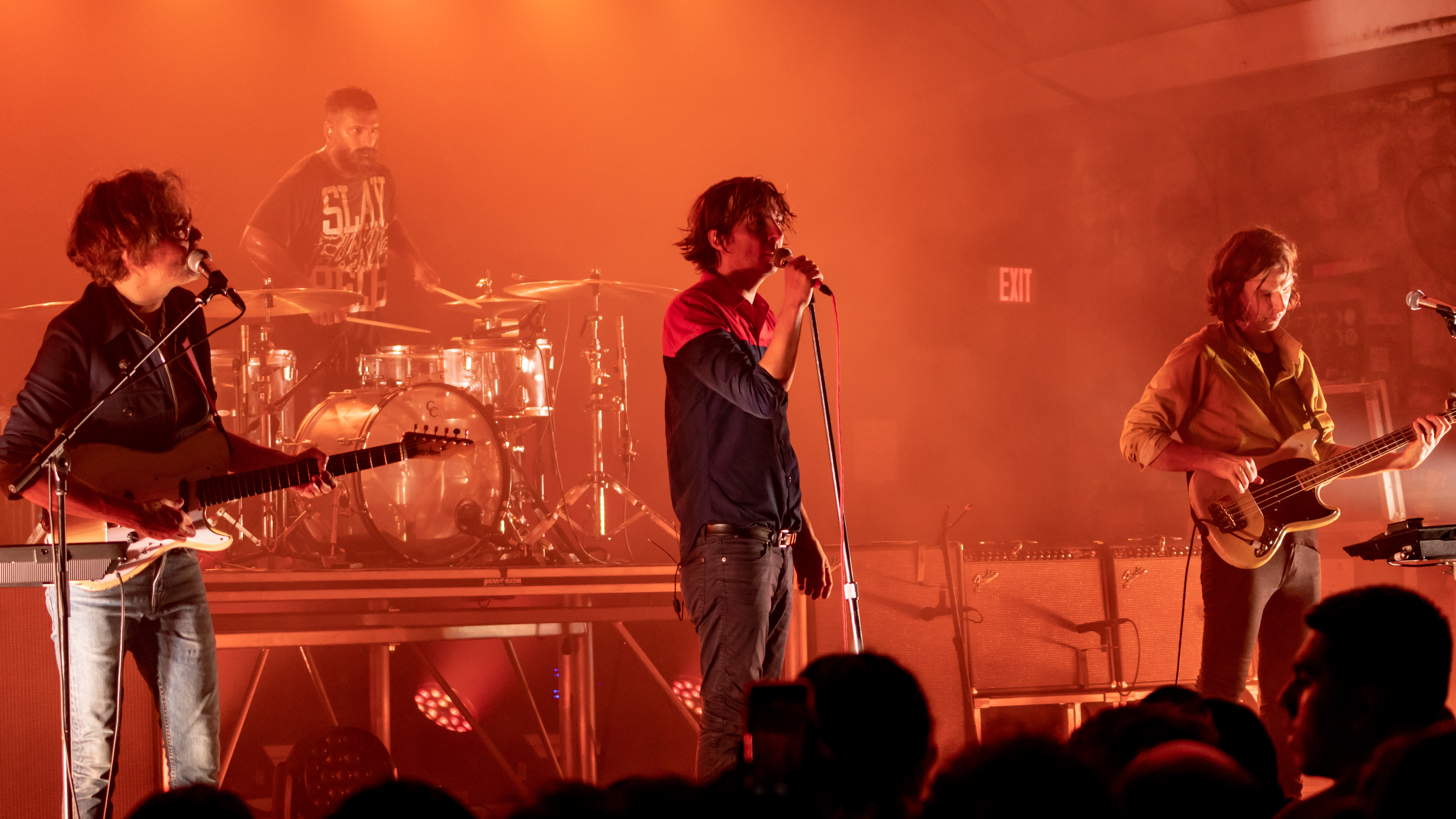
- Phoenix performing in 2018
- Studio albums: 7
- EPs: 1
- Live albums: 1
- Singles: 23
- Music videos: 19

French indie pop band Phoenix has released seven studio albums, two extended plays, one live album, twenty-three singles, and nineteen music videos. Their first three albums, United (2000), Alphabetical (2003), and It's Never Been Like That (2006), were released through Source, Virgin Records, and Astralwerks. The band received major commercial success following the release of Wolfgang Amadeus Phoenix (2009), which was released through V2 Records, Glassnote, Loyauté, and Cooperative Music. It was certified gold in Australia, Canada, and the United States. "1901", the album's lead single and "Lisztomania" the second single from the album were certified platinum in the US by the RIAA. After signing with Atlantic Records, the band released Bankrupt! (2013), which peaked at number three in the band's home country of France, making it their highest-peaking album there. The band's sixth album, Ti Amo (2017), had a positive commercial performance. The band's seventh album Alpha Zulu was released on 4 November 2022.

== Albums ==
=== Studio albums ===
Title	Album details	Peak chart positions										Certifications (sales thresholds)
Title	Album details	FRA	AUS	BEL (FL)	BEL (WA)	CAN	GER	NOR	SWI	UK	US	Certifications (sales thresholds)
United	Released: 12 June 2000; Label: Source, Virgin, Astralwerks; Format: CD, LP	90	—	—	—	—	—	37	—	—	—	
Alphabetical	Released: 29 March 2004; Label: Source, Virgin, Astralwerks; Format: CD, LP, CS	41	— (Note: Alphabetical did not enter the Australian ARIA Albums Chart but peaked at number 16 on the ARIA Hitseekers Chart.)	46	41	—	68	4	—	—	—	
It's Never Been Like That	Released: 15 May 2006; Label: Virgin, EMI, Astralwerks; Format: CD, LP, CS	34	81	86	89	—	41	14	66	108	— (Note: It's Never Been Like That did not enter the US Billboard 200, but peaked at number 23 on the US Heatseekers Albums Chart.)	
Wolfgang Amadeus Phoenix	Released: 25 May 2009; Label: V2, Loyauté, Glassnote, Cooperative Music; Format: CD, LP, DL	14	13	27	22	19	18	39	23	54	37	ARIA: Gold; BPI: Silver; MC: Gold; RIAA: Gold
Bankrupt!	Released: 22 April 2013; Label: Loyauté, Glassnote, Atlantic; Format: CD, LP, DL	3	5	21	22	4	18	33	22	14	4	
Ti Amo	Released: 9 June 2017; Label: Loyauté, Glassnote, Atlantic; Format: CD, LP, CS, DL	17	36	53	30	59	50	—	28	83	42	
Alpha Zulu	Released: 4 November 2022; Label: Loyauté, Glassnote; Format: CD, LP, CS, DL	44	—	—	68	—	—	—	90	— (Note: Alpha Zulu did not enter the UK Albums Chart, but peaked at number 23 on the UK Album Downloads Chart.)	— (Note: Alpha Zulu did not enter the US Billboard 200, but peaked at number 50 on the US Top Album Sales Chart.)	
"—" denotes releases that did not chart or were not released in that territory.

=== Live albums ===
Title	Album details
Live! Thirty Days Ago	Released: 8 November 2004; Label: Source, Astralwerks; Format: CD

== Extended plays ==
Title	Extended play details	Peak chart positions
Title	Extended play details	US
iTunes Live from SoHo	Released: 23 February 2010; Label: Ghettoblaster; Format: DL	148
iTunes Festival: London 2010	Released: 20 August 2010; Label: Ghettoblaster; Format: DL	—
"—" denotes releases that did not chart or were not released in that territory.

== Singles ==
List of singles as lead artist, with selected chart positions, showing year released and album name
Title	Year	Peak chart positions										Certifications	Album
Title	Year	FRA	BEL (FL)	BEL (WA)	ITA	JPN	NED	SWI	UK	US	US Rock	Certifications	Album
"Party Time"	1999	—	—	—	—	—	—	—	—	—	—		United
"Heatwave"	1999	—	—	—	—	—	—	—	—	—	—		Non-album single
"Too Young"	1999	97	—	—	—	—	—	—	148	—	—		United
"If I Ever Feel Better"	2000	12	—	8	4	—	67	23	65	—	—	SNEP: Gold; FIMI: Gold	United
"Everything Is Everything"	2004	—	—	—	40	—	91	—	74	—	—		Alphabetical
"Run Run Run"	2004	—	—	—	—	—	—	—	66	—	—		Alphabetical
"Long Distance Call"	2006	—	—	—	49	—	—	—	—	—	—		It's Never Been Like That
"Consolation Prizes"	2006	—	—	—	—	—	—	—	— (Note: "Consolation Prizes" did not enter the UK Singles Chart, but peaked at number 88 on the UK Physical Chart.)	—	—		It's Never Been Like That
"1901"	2009	—	—	—	—	—	—	—	— (Note: "1901" did not enter the UK Singles Chart, but peaked at number 31 on the UK Physical Chart.)	84	3	BPI: Silver; RIAA: Platinum	Wolfgang Amadeus Phoenix
"Lisztomania"	2009	131	— (Note: "Lisztomania" did not enter the Flanders Ultratop 50, but peaked at number 15 on the Ultratip chart.)	— (Note: "Lisztomania" did not enter the Wallonia Ultratop 50, but peaked at number 16 on the Ultratip chart.)	—	71	—	— (Note: "Lisztomania" did not enter the Swiss Singles chart, but charted at number 56 on the Swiss Airplay chart.)	— (Note: "Lisztomania" did not enter the UK Singles Chart, but peaked at number 89 on the UK Singles Sales Chart.)	— (Note: "Lisztomania" did not enter the Billboard Hot 100, but peaked at number 11 on the Billboard Bubbling Under Hot 100 chart.)	5	BPI: Silver; RIAA: Platinum	Wolfgang Amadeus Phoenix
"Fences"	2009	—	—	—	—	—	—	—	—	— (Note: "Fences" did not enter the Billboard Hot 100, but peaked at number 16 on the Hot Singles Sales chart.)	—		Wolfgang Amadeus Phoenix
"Lasso"	2010	—	—	—	—	—	—	—	—	—	— (Note: "Lasso" did not chart on the Hot Rock & Alternative Songs chart but did peak at number 31 on the Alternative Airplay chart.)		Wolfgang Amadeus Phoenix
"Entertainment"	2013	43	— (Note: "Entertainment" did not enter the Flanders Ultratop 50, but peaked at number 12 on the Ultratip chart.)	— (Note: "Entertainment" did not enter the Wallonia Ultratop 50, but peaked at number 29 on the Ultratip chart.)	—	66	—	— (Note: "Entertainment" did not enter the Swiss Singles chart, but charted at number 88 on the Swiss Airplay chart.)	177	— (Note: "Entertainment" did not enter the Billboard Hot 100, but peaked at number 49 on the Billboard Streaming Songs chart.)	22		Bankrupt!
"Trying to Be Cool"	2013	—	— (Note: "Trying to be Cool" did not enter the Flanders Ultratop 50, but peaked at number 20 on the Ultratip chart.)	—	—	—	—	—	—	—	31		Bankrupt!
"S.O.S. in Bel Air"	2013	—	—	—	—	—	—	—	—	—	—		Bankrupt!
"Alone on Christmas Day" (with Bill Murray, David Johansen and Jason Schwartzman)	2015	—	—	—	—	—	—	—	— (Note: "Alone on Christmas Day" did not enter the UK Singles Chart, but peaked at number 23 on the UK Physical Chart.)	— (Note: "Alone on Christmas Day" did not enter the Billboard Hot 100, but peaked at number two on the Hot Singles Sales chart.)	—		A Very Murray Christmas soundtrack
"J-Boy"	2017	58	— (Note: "J-Boy" did not enter the Flanders Ultratop 50, but peaked at number 30 on the Ultratip chart.)	— (Note: "J-Boy" did not enter the Wallonia Ultratop 50, but peaked at number 40 on the Ultratip chart.)	—	—	—	—	—	—	26		Ti Amo
"Ti Amo"	2017	—	— (Note: "Ti Amo" did not enter the Flanders Ultratop 50, but charted as an "extra tip" on the Ultratip chart.)	— (Note: "Ti Amo" did not enter the Wallonia Ultratop 50, but peaked at number 31 on the Ultratip chart.)	—	—	—	—	—	—	— (Note: "Ti Amo" did not chart on the Hot Rock & Alternative Songs chart but did peak at number 40 on the Triple A Airplay chart.)		Ti Amo
"Goodbye Soleil"	2017	115	—	—	—	—	—	—	—	—	—		Ti Amo
"Monologue"	2018	—	—	—	—	—	—	—	— (Note: "Monologue" did not enter the UK Singles Chart, but peaked at number 68 on the UK Physical Singles Chart.)	—	—		Non-album single
"Identical"	2020	—	— (Note: "Identical" did not enter the Flanders Ultratop 50, but charted as an "extra tip" on the Ultratip chart.)	—	—	—	—	—	— (Note: "Identical" did not enter the UK Singles Chart, but peaked at number 29 on the UK Physical Singles Chart.)	—	— (Note: "Identical" did not chart on the Hot Rock & Alternative Songs chart but did peak at number 24 on the Rock & Alternative Airplay chart.)		Alpha Zulu & On the Rocks soundtrack
"Alpha Zulu"	2022	—	—	—	—	—	—	—	—	—	— (Note: "Alpha Zulu" did not chart on the Hot Rock & Alternative Songs chart but did peak at number 17 on the Rock & Alternative Airplay chart.)		Alpha Zulu
"Tonight" (featuring Ezra Koenig)	2022	—	—	—	—	— (Note: "Tonight" did not enter the Billboard Japan Hot 100 chart, but peaked at number 16 on the Billboard Japan Hot Overseas chart.)	—	— (Note: "Tonight" did not enter the Swiss Singles chart, but charted at number 74 on the Swiss Airplay chart.)	—	—	— (Note: "Tonight" did not chart on the Hot Rock & Alternative Songs chart but did peak at number 11 on the Rock & Alternative Airplay chart.)		Alpha Zulu
"Winter Solstice"	2022	—	—	—	—	—	—	—	—	—	—		Alpha Zulu
"After Midnight" (featuring Clairo)	2023	—	—	—	—	—	—	—	—	—	— (Note: "After Midnight" did not chart on the Hot Rock & Alternative Songs chart but did peak at number 32 on the Alternative Airplay chart.)		Non-album singles
"Odyssey" (with Beck)	2023	—	—	—	—	— (Note: "Odyssey" did not enter the Billboard Japan Hot 100 chart, but peaked at number two on the Billboard Japan Hot Overseas chart.)	—	—	— (Note: "Odyssey" did not enter the UK Singles Chart, but peaked at number 9 on the UK Physical Singles Chart.)	—	— (Note: "Odyssey" did not chart on the Hot Rock & Alternative Songs chart but did peak at number 17 on the Rock & Alternative Airplay chart.)		Non-album singles
"All Eyes on Me" (featuring Benee, Chad Hugo, and Pusha T)	2023	—	—	—	—	—	—	—	—	—	—		Non-album singles
"Artefact" (featuring León Larregui)	2023	—	—	—	—	—	—	—	—	—	—		Non-album singles
"Nightcall" (with Angèle and Kavinsky)	2024	3	18	4	—	—	—	—	—	—	—	SNEP: Diamond	Non-album singles
"—" denotes releases that did not chart or were not released in that territory.

=== Promotional singles ===
Title	Year	Peaks	Album
Title	Year	MEX Air.	Album
"(You Can't Blame It On) Anybody"	2004	×	Alphabetical
"Rally"	2007	×	It's Never Been Like That
"Armistice"	2010	40	Wolfgang Amadeus Phoenix
"Chloroform"	2013	—	Bankrupt!
"—" denotes releases that did not chart or were not released in that territory. "×" denotes periods where charts did not exist or were not archived

== Music videos ==
- "Funky Squaredance" (2000): directed by Roman Coppola
- "Too Young" (2001): directed by Steven Hanft
- "If I Ever Feel Better" (2001): directed by Alex and Martin
- "Everything Is Everything" (2004): directed by Roman Coppola
- "Run Run Run" (2004): directed by Mathieu Tonetti
- "I'm an Actor" (2004)
- "Long Distance Call" (2006): directed by Roman Coppola
- "Consolation Prizes" (2006): directed by Daniel Askill
- "Rally" (2007): directed by Daniel Askill and Lorin Askill
- "Lisztomania" (2009): directed by Antoine Wagner
- "1901" (2009): directed by Dylan Byrne (Dazed Digital) and Ben Strebel (Bogstandard)
- "Entertainment" (2013): directed by Patrick Daughters
- "Trying to Be Cool/Drakkar Noir" (2013): directed by CANADA
- "Chloroform" (2013): directed by Sofia Coppola
- "J-Boy" (2017): directed by Warren Fu
- "Goodbye Soleil" (2017): footage by Dodi El Sherbini
- "Ti Amo" (2017): directed by Wiissa
- "Role Model" (2018) : directed by Chris Hopkins and Adrian Maben
- "Identical" (2020) : directed by Roman Coppola
- ”Alpha Zulu” (2022) : directed by Pascal Teixeira, Emma Besson and Louis Bes
- "Tonight" (2022) : directed by Oscar Boyson
- "Winter Solstice" (2022) : directed by Warren Fu and Saoli Nash
- "After Midnight" (2022) : directed by Pennacky
