= List of awards and nominations received by Phoenix =

Phoenix awards and nominations
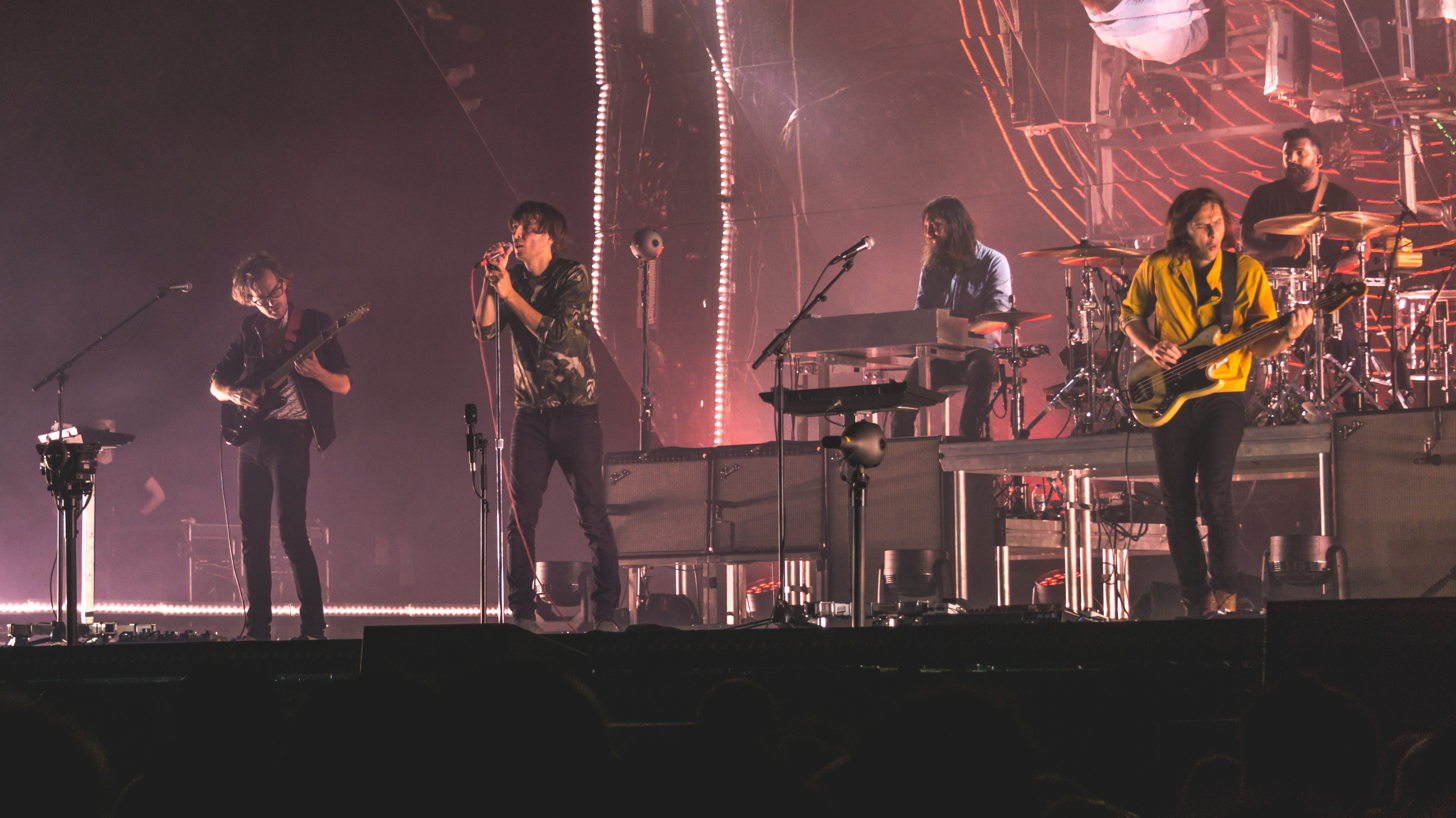
- Phoenix at the Alexandra Palace in 2017
Awards and nominations
Award	Wins	Nominations
American Music Awards	0	1
Grammy Awards	1	1
International Dance Music Awards	0	3
MTV Europe Music Awards	0	2
NME Awards	0	1
Victoires de la Musique	1	1
- Totals
Awards won	2
Nominations	9

Phoenix is a French band composed of 4 members named Thomas Mars (lead vocals), Deck d'Arcy (bass/ keyboards/ backing vocals), Christian Mazzalai (guitar/ keyboards/ backing vocals) and Laurent Brancowitz (guitar/ backing vocals). They have won 2 awards from 9 nominations.

== American Music Awards ==
The American Music Awards (AMAs) is an annual music awards show created by Dick Clark in 1973.

Year	Nominee / work	Award	Result	Ref.
2010	Phoenix	Favorite Alternative Artist	Nominated	

== Grammy Awards ==
The Grammy Awards are awarded annually by the National Academy of Recording Arts and Sciences of the United States.

Year	Nominee / work	Award	Result	Ref.
2010	Wolfgang Amadeus Phoenix	Best Alternative Music Album	Won	

== International Dance Music Awards ==
The International Dance Music Awards, established in 1985, are an annual awards show honoring dance and electronic artists. It is a part of the Winter Music Conference, a weeklong electronic music event held annually.

Year	Nominee / work	Award	Result	Ref.
2010	"1901"	Best Alternative/Rock Dance Track	Nominated	
2010	Phoenix	Best Break-Through Artist (Group)	Nominated	
2011	Phoenix	Best Artist (Group)	Nominated	

== MTV Europe Music Awards ==
The MTV Europe Music Awards was established in 1994 by MTV Europe to award the music videos from European and international artists.

Year	Nominee / work	Award	Result	Ref.
2000	Phoenix	Best French Act	Nominated	
2010	Phoenix	Best French Act	Nominated	

== mtvU Woodie Awards ==
Year	Nominee / work	Award	Result	Ref.
2009	Phoenix	Performing Woodie	Nominated	

== NME Awards ==
The NME Awards are awarded annually by the UK music magazine NME.

Year	Nominee / work	Award	Result	Ref.
2014	Phoenix	Best International Band	Nominated	

== Victoires de la Musique ==
The Victoires de la Musique is an annual French award ceremony by the French Ministry of Culture to recognize outstanding achievement in the music industry that recognizes the best musical artists of the year.

Year	Nominee / work	Award	Result	Ref.
2014	Bankrupt!	Rock Album of the Year	Won	
