= Chloroform (disambiguation) =

Chloroform is a chemical compound with the molecular formula CHCl_{3}.

Chloroform may also refer to:

- "Chloroform" (song), a song by Phoenix
- "Chloroform", a song by Crystal Castles from Amnesty (I)
- "Chloroform", a song by SycAmour

== See also ==
- Cloroform, a Norwegian alternative band
