= Alpha Zulu =

Studio album by Phoenix
- Released: 4 November 2022
- Recorded: 2020–2022
- Studio: Musée des Arts décoratifs (Paris)
- Genres: Synth rock; pop rock
- Length: 35:23
- Labels: Loyauté; Glassnote
- Producer: Phoenix

Phoenix chronology
Ti Amo (2017)	Alpha Zulu (2022)

Singles from Alpha Zulu
- 1. "Identical" Released: 19 August 2020; 2. "Alpha Zulu" Released: 1 June 2022; 3. "Tonight" Released: 7 September 2022; 4. "Winter Solstice" Released: 20 October 2022

Alpha Zulu is the seventh studio album by French indie pop band Phoenix, released on 4 November 2022 through Loyauté and Glassnote Records. Self-produced by the band, it is their first album since 2017's Ti Amo. The singles "Identical", "Alpha Zulu", "Tonight", and "Winter Solstice" preceded the album. The band embarked on a tour in support of the album, which visited North America, the UK and Europe in late 2022, with another tour of North America that commenced in August 2023. The album received critical acclaim.

== Background and recording ==
Phoenix began recording the album during the COVID-19 pandemic in 2020 at the Musée des Arts décoratifs studio, which is located within the Louvre Palace in Paris. Laurent Brancowitz said the band "felt it would be a fantastic adventure to create something out of nothing" in an empty museum. Christian Mazzalai said that despite his initial concerns of making something while being surrounded by "too much beauty", the band "couldn't stop producing music" and that they wrote "almost all" of Alpha Zulu within the first 10 days. The album was inspired by Philippe Zdar of the band Cassius, who died in 2019. Zdar produced three of Phoenix's prior albums and gave advice to the band regularly, even on records he did not produce. While contributing no actual compositions or productions to the album, Thomas Bangalter of Daft Punk was asked by the band to help in the same advisory role.

The song "Identical" was first released in 2020 on the soundtrack for Sofia Coppola's film On the Rocks. Following the song's release, frontman Thomas Mars stated that it "goes in a different sonic direction from the LP", which feels "all over the place" and like the "same sort of weird Frankenstein of an album" that the band's debut United is. The version of "Identical" released in 2020 has a duration of 3:13, while the listed length of the Alpha Zulu version is 5:02.

== Artwork and title ==
Pascal Teixeira's cover art for Alpha Zulu and accompanying singles is an edited portion of the 1478 painting Madonna col Bambino mediante otto angeli by Sandro Botticelli. The inspiration for the title came from Mars hearing "alpha zulu" over an airplane radio during a bout of turbulence. The words come from the ICAO alphabet, also known as the NATO phonetic alphabet; Alpha would phonetically be used for the letter A, and Zulu for the letter Z.

== Promotion ==
Phoenix toured North America during September and October 2022 to promote the album. They performed at the Radio City Music Hall in New York City on 9 September 2022. They also appeared and performed on several late night talk shows including The Late Show with Stephen Colbert and Jimmy Kimmel Live!. Phoenix toured Europe in late 2022 and will tour Asia and make festival appearances across the world in 2023. Phoenix toured North America with Beck from August to September 2023 on the Summer Odyssey Tour, which visited 20 cities.

== Critical reception ==
Professional ratings
Aggregate scores
Source	Rating
Metacritic	84/100
Review scores
Source	Rating
AllMusic	4.5/5 stars
Evening Standard	4/5 stars
Exclaim!	8/10
The Independent	5/5 stars
The Line of Best Fit	8/10
NME	4/5 stars
Paste	7.3/10
Pitchfork	7.1/10
Slant Magazine	3.5/5 stars
The Sydney Morning Herald	3/5 stars

On Metacritic, Alpha Zulu received a score of 84 out of 100 based on 16 critics' reviews, indicating "universal acclaim". Helen Brown of The Independent felt that the album "is packed with an impressive amount of energy and ideas for a band celebrating their 25th anniversary" and "all 10 tracks are stacked with hooks, making it as good as their 2009 breakthrough album, Wolfgang Amadeus Phoenix". Writing for NME, Thomas Smith called it an album "that further confirms their place as one of the scene's most consistently enjoyable bands" with "nods to the razor-sharp pop hits from their beginnings ('If I Ever Feel Better'), to the indie-disco bangers that preceded their era of early '10s indie" like "1901" and "Lisztomania".

Concluding the album review for AllMusic, Heather Phares claimed it to be "Phoenix's most immediate work since Wolfgang Amadeus Phoenix and their most varied since United, Alpha Zulu does indeed range from A to Z, but the band are always in control and the results are frequently brilliant." David Smyth of the Evening Standard wrote that "With a sound that has never dated, there's plenty more here to confirm that there's no reason why Phoenix should stop doing what they're doing now."

Charles Lyons-Burt of Slant Magazine described the album as "deceptively simple, fleet pop for which the band is best known" and found that "the band favors needling synths and skittering drum machines over the crisp guitars and live percussion of their earlier efforts". Writing for Paste, Grant Sharples found Alpha Zulu to be "rife with contradictions and anomalies, but that makes it entertaining", concluding that "Within its first two tracks, Alpha Zulu establishes itself as an album that defies taxonomy. The result is as jarring as it is rapturous."

Alex Hudson of Exclaim! found that "Much like 2017's Ti Amo, Alpha Zulu has a romantic warmth that transcends lyrics, which evade interpretation", opining that "Phoenix in 2022 sound pretty much identical to how they did at the peak of their powers" and ultimately calling it "an album that often feels like a trip back to the aughts". Reviewing the album for The Line of Best Fit, Simon Heavisides found that it "confronts reality with a dreamy neon-lit elegance pulsing with playful vitality" and "runs on its nerves but has its feet on the dance floor".

Annabel Ross of The Sydney Morning Herald summarised the album as "slightly less consistent than their earlier efforts and not quite as adventurous as United, but still plenty charming". Pitchfork's Brady Brickner-Wood wrote that Phoenix's "euphoric synth rock sounds as good as it ever has, the songs gushing with renewed enthusiasm and glittery production", describing Alpha Zulu as "a fun, fizzy record that'll undoubtedly find a home on strobe-lit dancefloors across the world". Writing for The Daily Telegraph, Michelle Kambasha judged that the album "sounds distinctly like one of theirs, yet they're still a bunch of wide-eyed eccentrics, looking to marry what-would-be-ordinary pop with the unconventional", concluding that it is "a robust addition to their already acclaimed catalogue".

== Track listing ==
All tracks are written by Phoenix.

Alpha Zulu track listing
No.	Title	Length
1.	"Alpha Zulu"	2:52
2.	"Tonight" (featuring Ezra Koenig)	4:06
3.	"The Only One"	3:29
4.	"After Midnight"	3:11
5.	"Winter Solstice"	3:56
6.	"Season 2"	2:47
7.	"Artefact"	3:24
8.	"All Eyes on Me"	3:04
9.	"My Elixir"	3:32
10.	"Identical"	5:02
Total length:		35:23

== Personnel ==
Phoenix

- Deck d'Arcy – bass, keyboards
- Laurent Brancowitz – guitars, keyboards
- Thomas Mars – vocals, drums, percussion
- Christian Mazzalai – guitars

Additional musicians

- Ezra Koenig – vocals ("Tonight")
- Thomas Hedlund – additional drums and percussion ("After Midnight")
- Rob – additional keyboards ("All Eyes on Me")

Production

- Ian Kirkpatrick – additional production ("Alpha Zulu")
- Manny Marroquin – mixing
- Joe LaPorta – mastering
- Zach Pereyra – mixing assistant
- Anthony Vilchis – mixing assistant
- Trey Station – mixing assistant
- Louis Bes – recording assistant
- Matt DiMona – engineer
- Kyle Parker Smith – engineer
- Robin Florent – additional engineering
- Jack Lahana – additional engineering
- Pierrick Devin – recording engineer ("Identical")
- Antoine Peyton – engineering assistance ("Identical")
- Daniel Berglund – recording of additional drums and percussion ("After Midnight")
- Ariel Rechtshaid – recording of Ezra Koenig's vocals ("Tonight")

Design

- Pascal Teixeira – art direction and cover design
- Liz Hirsch – layout and design

== Charts ==
Chart performance for Alpha Zulu
Chart (2022–2023)	Peak position
Belgian Albums (Ultratop Wallonia)	68
French Albums (SNEP)	44
Scottish Albums (Official Charts)	70
Swiss Albums (Schweizer Hitparade)	90
UK Album Downloads (Official Charts)	23
UK Independent Albums (Official Charts)	27
US Top Album Sales (Billboard)	50
