= Chloroform (song) =

2013 promotional single by Phoenix

Promotional single by Phoenix

from the album Bankrupt!
- Released: 25 March 2013
- Length: 4:05
- Label: Loyauté; Glassnote; Atlantic
- Songwriter: Phoenix
- Producer: Phoenix

Music video
- "Chloroform" on YouTube

"Chloroform" is a song written and performed by Phoenix, issued as the first promotional single from the band's fifth studio album Bankrupt!. The official remix of the song features noise pop band Sleigh Bells.

On 30 April 2013, the band performed the song on Late Show with David Letterman during the Live on Letterman webcast that also featured performances of several of their other songs.

== Music video ==
Although the song was not issued as an official single, a music video was created for the song, directed by Sofia Coppola (the wife of lead singer Thomas Mars).

== Critical reception ==
The song has received positive reviews from critics. Jon Dolan of Rolling Stone referred to the song as "restrained pout soul"; while Chris Payne of Billboard called the song a highlight and complimented its "balmy, tropical feel" while comparing it favorably to the work of Delorean and The Tough Alliance. Steven Arroyo of Time highlighted the song as one of the best songs on the album (along with official lead single "Entertainment" and album cut "Bourgeois").
