= Too Young (Phoenix song) =

Single by Phoenix

from the album United
- Released: 29 May 2000
- Genre: Rock; soft rock; power pop; disco-pop
- Length: 3:17
- Label: Virgin
- Songwriters: Thomas Pablo Croquet; Christian Mazzalai; Laurent Mazzalai; Frederic Moulin
- Producers: Phoenix; Philippe Zdar

Phoenix singles chronology
"Heatwave" (1999)	"Too Young" (2000)	"If I Ever Feel Better" (2001)

"Too Young" is a song by French rock band Phoenix and is featured on their 2000 debut studio album, United. It was the band's first single to chart.

The song has appeared in the films Shallow Hal (2001) and Lost in Translation (2003), as well as on the miniseries Maid (2021).

== Track listing ==
1. "Too Young" – 3:17
2. "Too Young" (Zoot Woman remix) – 3:51
3. "Too Young" (Le Knight Club remix) – 4:58

== Charts ==
Chart performance for "Too Young"
Chart (2001)	Peak position
France (SNEP)	97
