= If I Ever Feel Better =

Single by Phoenix

from the album United
- Released: 22 January 2001
- Genre: French house
- Length: 3:42
- Label: Virgin
- Songwriters: Thomas Pablo Croquet; Christian Mazzalai; Laurent Mazzalai; Frederic Moulin
- Producers: Phoenix; Philippe Zdar

Phoenix singles chronology
"Too Young" (1999)	"If I Ever Feel Better" (2001)	"Everything Is Everything" (2004)

"If I Ever Feel Better" is a song by French band Phoenix, released on 1 June 2000 as the third single from their debut studio album, United. It contains a sample of Japanese jazz musician Toshiyuki Honda's 1979 track "Lament", which was written by Chikara Ueda. The song remains Phoenix's highest charting in both France and internationally, reaching top-10 positions in Belgium, Italy and Spain, as well as number 12 in France. It was certified gold in Italy by FIMI in 2017.

== Critical reception ==
In a review for the band's album It's Never Been Like That, Rob Mitchum of Pitchfork referred to the song and "Everything Is Everything" as "brilliant" with "production as crisp as a Frito and singer Thomas Mars' mercury croon" that "could slot into the playlists of hipsters and receptionists alike". In a review for Erlend Øye's DJ-Kicks album that includes a remix of the track, Nick Sylvester called the original version an "utterly catchy French house gem".

== Track listing ==
1. "If I Ever Feel Better" (edit) – 3:42
2. "'If I Ever Feel Better, I'll Go to the Disco' Said the Buffalo Bunch" – 6:09
3. "On Fire" (Nash Kato version) – 2:05

== Charts ==
Chart performance for "If I Ever Feel Better"
Chart (2000–2001)	Peak position
Belgium (Ultratop 50 Wallonia)	8
France (SNEP)	12
Italy (FIMI)	4
Netherlands (Single Top 100)	67
Netherlands (Tipparade)	8
Spain (PROMUSICAE)	6
Switzerland (Schweizer Hitparade)	23
UK Singles (OCC)	65

== Certifications ==
Certifications for "If I Ever Feel Better"
Region	Certification	Certified units/sales
France (SNEP)	Gold	250,000^{*}
Italy (FIMI)	Gold	25,000^{‡}
^{*} Sales figures based on certification alone.^{‡} Sales+streaming figures based on certification alone.
