= Consolation Prizes =

Single by Phoenix

from the album It's Never Been Like That
- Released: 11 September 2006
- Recorded: 2005–2006
- Genre: Indie pop
- Length: 3:16
- Label: Source
- Songwriters: Thomas Pablo Croquet, Christian Mazzalai, Laurent Mazzalai, Frederic Moulin
- Producers: Phoenix, Tony Hoffer

Phoenix singles chronology
"Long Distance Call" (2006)	"Consolation Prizes" (2006)	"1901" (2009)

"Consolation Prizes" is a song by French rock band Phoenix and is featured on their third studio album, It's Never Been Like That. It was released 11 September 2006 as the second single from that album (see 2006 in music).

The promotional video for the song was directed by Daniel Askill on location in Paris over the course of 3 nights. It was released 17 July 2006 on the Phoenix homepage.

== Track listings ==
- Promo CD SOURCDJ124 / 0946 3 68640 2 0
1. "Consolation Prizes" – 3:16
- 7" SOUR124
1. "Consolation Prizes" – 3:16
2. "Consolation Prizes" (remix by L'Aiglon)
- CD SOURCD124 / 0946 3 74956 2 9
1. "Consolation Prizes" – 3:16
2. "Consolation Prizes" (extended version)
