= Trying to Be Cool =

Single by Phoenix

from the album Bankrupt!
- Released: 9 July 2013
- Recorded: 2011–2012
- Genre: Synth-pop; disco
- Length: 3:48 (album version); 3:33 (radio edit)
- Label: Loyauté; Glassnote; Atlantic
- Songwriters: Thomas Pablo Croquet; Christian Mazzalai; Laurent Mazzalai; Frederic Moulin
- Producer: Phoenix

Phoenix singles chronology
"Entertainment" (2013)	"Trying to Be Cool" (2013)	"S.O.S. in Bel Air" (2013)

"Trying to Be Cool" is a song by the French band Phoenix from their fifth album Bankrupt!. It was released as the second single from the album on 8 July 2013. The official remix features R. Kelly. The song became Phoenix's third top-ten hit on the Billboard Alternative Songs chart, after "1901" and "Lisztomania". The song's cover includes a mint julep, which is said in one of the song's lines, "mint julep testosterone". Frontman Thomas Mars told Spin magazine the lyrics to "Trying to Be Cool" mainly analyse "the beauty of the fake".

== Music video ==
The single's music video, which was directed by Nicolás Méndez aka CANADA and produced by the homonymous production company, CANADA, and The Creators Project, was released on YouTube on 2 July 2013. The music video includes a "surprise" made every 20 seconds.

The version of the song used in the music video is more guitar-driven and less synthesizer-driven than the album version. In addition, the video version is a medley with "Drakkar Noir". This combination has become the typical live-performance of the song for Phoenix's concerts.

== R. Kelly remix ==
During Phoenix's headlining set at Coachella on 13 April 2013, the band brought out American R&B singer R. Kelly to perform multiple songs together. Kelly was unfamiliar with Phoenix's music beforehand, but Phoenix sent Kelly's manager their plans to mash-up the two artists' songs. In a Pitchfork interview, both parties confirmed that they had a studio collaboration in the works. The "Trying to Be Cool" remix with R. Kelly was released on 14 August 2013.

In 2014, when The Guardian asked Phoenix frontman Thomas Mars about the moral implications of working with Kelly given his child sexual abuse accusations, Mars said:

I thought people would care less, to be honest. Because his case was filed and he wasn't guilty. It felt to us like that was done and he was moving on and so it wasn't in bad taste. It felt like a second chance, not that we gave him that, but it felt like something else. I was more worried about him being on time to be honest. He doesn't fly and so his tourbus took five days to get from Chicago to Palm Springs. When we went on stage he was still stuck in traffic.

Following renewed media attention about Kelly's alleged crimes as a result of the Surviving R. Kelly documentary, the band apologised on Twitter for collaborating with Kelly.

We are deeply horrified by the stories of abuse surrounding R. Kelly.
We regret that we were not both more informed and more discerning when we worked with him previously. We fully support all victims of sexual abuse, and it's our hope that there will be a path to justice.

== Charts ==
=== Weekly charts ===
Weekly chart performance for "Trying to Be Cool"
Chart (2013)	Peak position
Belgium (Ultratip Bubbling Under Wallonia)	20
Canada Rock Songs (Billboard)	29
US Hot Rock Songs (Billboard)	31
US Rock Airplay (Billboard)	16

=== Year-end charts ===
Year-end chart performance for "Trying to Be Cool"
Chart (2013)	Position
US Alternative Songs (Billboard)	30
