= Ti Amo (album) =

Studio album by Phoenix
- Released: 9 June 2017
- Recorded: 2014–2017
- Studio: La Gaîté Lyrique (Paris)
- Genres: Synth-pop; Italo disco
- Length: 36:36
- Labels: Loyauté; Glassnote
- Producers: Phoenix; Pierrick Devin

Phoenix chronology
| Bankrupt! (2013) | Ti Amo (2017) | Alpha Zulu (2022) |

Singles from Ti Amo
- 1. "J-Boy" Released: 27 April 2017; 2. "Ti Amo" Released: 18 May 2017; 3. "Goodbye Soleil" Released: 2 June 2017

Ti Amo (pronounced [ti ˈaːmo]; Italian for "I love you") is the sixth studio album by French band Phoenix. It was released on 9 June 2017 by Loyauté and Glassnote Records. Recording began in 2014 at La Gaîté Lyrique in Paris, an arts centre that was built at the site of a theatre. The band promoted the album by releasing three singles and embarking on a world tour. "J-Boy" was the first single, released on 27 April 2017, "Ti Amo" was the second, released on 18 May. The third single, "Goodbye Soleil" was released on 2 June. The album received generally positive reviews from critics. It was a modest commercial success, peaking at number 17 in France and within the top 40 in Australia, Belgium, and Switzerland.

== Composition ==
Ti Amo has been described as featuring synth-pop and Italo disco throughout. Phoenix said in a press release that the album is about "our European, Latin roots, a fantasized version of Italy", and that the songs focus on "simple, pure emotions: love, desire, lust, and innocence". Guitarist Laurent Brancowitz commented that the album recalls "summer and Italian discos". Daniel Glass, head of Glassnote Records, stated: "I think the record came out of darkness, out of concern. But what's resulted is this incredibly colorful record."

== Promotion ==
The first single, "J-Boy", was released on 27 April 2017, and debuted on Zane Lowe's Beats 1 show. The New York Times noted the song's "midtempo disco pulse", and it was named "Best New Track" by Pitchfork. It was performed live on The Tonight Show Starring Jimmy Fallon on 2 May. The title track was released as the second single on 18 May 2017. It was premiered at a concert in Antwerp in April 2017, along with "J-Boy", "Lovelife" and "Role Model". "Goodbye Soleil" was released for streaming on 2 June.

Phoenix toured North America from 12 May to 15 June 2017, concluding at the Hollywood Bowl in Los Angeles. They then toured Europe and Asia in support of the album until September.

== Critical reception ==
Professional ratings
Aggregate scores
| Source | Rating |
|---|---|
| AnyDecentMusic? | 6.7/10 |
| Metacritic | 70/100 |
Review scores
| Source | Rating |
| AllMusic | 3.5/5 stars |
| The A.V. Club | C+ |
| Consequence of Sound | B+ |
| Exclaim! | 8/10 |
| The Guardian | 3/5 stars |
| The Observer | 3/5 stars |
| Pitchfork | 7.0/10 |
| Q | 4/5 stars |
| Rolling Stone | 3.5/5 stars |
| Uncut | 6/10 |

At Metacritic, which assigns a weighted average rating out of 100 to reviews from mainstream critics, the album received an average score of 70, based on 23 reviews, which indicates "generally favorable reviews". The Observer gave Ti Amo three stars out of five, saying "in the 17 years since their potent first album, United, Phoenix have lost some of their exuberance." They continued that "Ti Amo is slow to reveal its charms, there are moments when the cheesy concept – a romanticised version of Italy – is made to seem like a brilliant idea." Sister paper The Guardian also awarded the album three stars, acknowledging that "self-aware cheesiness is a difficult tightrope to tiptoe across." They did recognize "the album’s standout track 'Tuttifrutti', and the melancholic tang of the band’s best songwriting peeks out behind the silly stuff, it works gloriously." Pitchfork called Phoenix "as decadent and beguiling as ever" on their sixth album. "Ti Amo is another meticulously constructed 10-song set of glossy soft-pop romance," they concluded.

=== Accolades ===
| Publication | Accolade | Year | Rank | Ref. |
|---|---|---|---|---|
| Consequence of Sound | Top 50 Albums of 2017 | 2017 | 43 | |
| Les Inrockuptibles | Best 100 Albums of 2017 | 2017 | 16 | |
| NME | NME's Albums of the Year 2017 | 2017 | 43 | |

== Track listing ==
All tracks are written by Phoenix.

| No. | Title | Length |
|---|---|---|
| 1. | "J-Boy" | 4:08 |
| 2. | "Ti Amo" | 3:25 |
| 3. | "Tuttifrutti" | 3:52 |
| 4. | "Fior di Latte" | 4:03 |
| 5. | "Lovelife" | 2:31 |
| 6. | "Goodbye Soleil" | 3:55 |
| 7. | "Fleur de Lys" | 3:43 |
| 8. | "Role Model" | 4:35 |
| 9. | "Via Veneto" | 2:41 |
| 10. | "Telefono" | 3:43 |
| Total length: | | 36:36 |

Sample credits

- "Lovelife" contains a sample of "October (Love Song)" by Chris & Cosey
- "Fleur de Lys" contains a sample of "Expensive Shit" by Fela Kuti

== Personnel ==
Adapted from the album liner notes.

Phoenix

- Deck d'Arcy
- Laurent Brancowitz
- Thomas Mars
- Christian Mazzalai

Additional musicians

- Kinga Burza – phone message (track 7)
- Dodi El Sherbini – additional production (tracks 4 and 9), keyboards (track 1)
- Thomas Hedlund – drums
- Mike Lévy – assistance (track 4)

Production

- Michael H. Brauer – mixing (tracks 1, 5, 7, 8 and 9)
- Pierre Le Cardinal – audio technical support
- Laurent d'Herbécourt – additional recording
- Pierrick Devin – mixing (tracks 2–10), production, recording, analog transfer
- Alex Gopher – mastering (tracks 3 and 5–10)
- Jean Marc Harel – audio technical support
- Florian Lagatta – analog transfer
- Joe LaPorta – mastering (tracks 1, 2 and 4)
- Steve Vealey – mixing assistance, Pro Tools engineering
- Philippe Zdar – special guidance

Artwork

- Warren Fu – art direction
- Liz Hirsch – design
- Antoine Wagner – photography
- Theo Le Sourd – photography

== Charts ==
| Chart (2017) | Peak position |
|---|---|
| Australian Albums (ARIA) | 36 |
| Austrian Albums (Ö3 Austria) | 69 |
| Belgian Albums (Ultratop Flanders) | 53 |
| Belgian Albums (Ultratop Wallonia) | 30 |
| Canadian Albums (Billboard) | 59 |
| French Albums (SNEP) | 17 |
| German Albums (Offizielle Top 100) | 50 |
| Irish Albums (IRMA) | 74 |
| Japanese Albums (Oricon) | 70 |
| New Zealand Heatseeker Albums (RMNZ) | 7 |
| Scottish Albums (Official Charts) | 82 |
| Spanish Albums (Promusicae) | 80 |
| Swiss Albums (Schweizer Hitparade) | 28 |
| UK Albums (Official Charts) | 83 |
| US Billboard 200 | 42 |
| US Top Alternative Albums (Billboard) | 3 |
| US Top Rock Albums (Billboard) | 7 |
