= Live! Thirty Days Ago =

Live album by Phoenix
- Released: 8 November 2004
- Recorded: 20 September – 1 October 2004
- Genre: Rock
- Length: 50:32
- Label: Source
- Producer: Phoenix

Phoenix chronology
Alphabetical (2004)	Live! Thirty Days Ago (2004)	It's Never Been Like That (2006)

Professional ratings
Review scores
Source	Rating
AllMusic	2/5 stars
Pitchfork	6.5/10

Live! Thirty Days Ago is a live album by French rock band Phoenix, originally recorded during their September and October 2004 tour of Scandinavia and released on 8 November 2004.

In the United Kingdom and the United States it was only available via digital download after 30 November 2004, and was released on CD on 11 January 2005 in the UK and 22 February 2005 in the US.

== Track listing ==
All tracks are written by Phoenix.

Live! Thirty Days Ago track listing
No.	Title	Length
1.	"Run Run Run"	5:46
2.	"Victim of the Crime"	3:29
3.	"Too Young"	3:41
4.	"I'm an Actor"	4:25
5.	"Alphabetical"	4:25
6.	"Funky Squaredance"	7:27
7.	"(You Can't Blame It On) Anybody"	4:13
8.	"Everything Is Everything"	5:30
9.	"If I Ever Feel Better"	7:09
10.	"Love for Granted"	4:23

- "Run Run Run", "Victim of the Crime", "Too Young", and "Alphabetical" recorded 1 October 2004 in Vega, Copenhagen, Denmark.
- "I'm an Actor" recorded 28 September 2004 in Tavastia, Helsinki, Finland.
- "Funky Squaredance", "(You Can't Blame It On) Anybody", and "If I Ever Feel Better" recorded 24 September 2004 in Rockefeller, Oslo, Norway.
- "Everything is Everything" recorded 29 September 2004 in Berns, Stockholm, Sweden.
- "Love for Granted" recorded 20 September 2004 in Folken, Stavanger, Norway.

== Personnel ==
- Deck D'Arcy – bass guitar and backing vocals
- Laurent Brancowitz – guitar, keyboards and backing vocals
- Thomas Mars – lead vocals
- Christian Mazzalai – guitar and backing vocals
- Chassol – keyboards
- Lawrence Clais – drums and backing vocals
