= Alphabetical (album) =

Studio album by Phoenix
- Released: 29 March 2004
- Recorded: 2003–2004
- Genres: Indie pop; soft rock
- Length: 37:37
- Label: Source
- Producers: Phoenix; Tony Hoffer

Phoenix chronology
United (2000)	Alphabetical (2004)	Live! Thirty Days Ago (2004)

Singles from Alphabetical
- 1. "Run Run Run" Released: 19 April 2004; 2. "Everything Is Everything" Released: 21 June 2004

Professional ratings
Aggregate scores
Source	Rating
Metacritic	74/100
Review scores
Source	Rating
AllMusic	3/5 stars
Alternative Press	4/5
Blender	3/5 stars
DIY	3.5/5 stars
Drowned in Sound	(8/10)
NME	(8/10)
Pitchfork	(6.7/10)
Rolling Stone	3/5 stars
Spin	B−
Uncut	4/5 stars

Alphabetical is the second studio album by French indie pop band Phoenix, released in 2004. The album has two singles, "Everything Is Everything" and "Run Run Run".

== Commercial performance ==
The album has sold 30,000 copies in the United States according to Nielsen SoundScan. Overall it has shipped 170,000 copies worldwide with 65,000 shipped units in continental Europe and Japan, 20,000 of those were in France.

== Critical response ==
Alphabetical was met with largely positive reviews. DIY Magazine called the record "a beautiful and melodious, yet still not quite on a par with some of their debut album." Drowned in Sound described Alphabetical as "a deceptively simply album; a lot of work has gone into making tunes as beautifully organic as this sound so impressively pieced together." They gave the album (8/10), concluding it to be "so utterly, utterly Parisian. Not French, mind, Parisian. But what else did you expect? The most sophisticated, deliciously out of step pop album of 2004 simply had to come from the most urbane, beautiful city in the world." Pitchfork praised the lead single "Everything Is Everything" as "a glorious example of how to write a classically ambiguous soft-pop song." They gave the album a score of 6.7 describing the entire record as something that "doesn't ask you to remember it in the morning."

== Track listing ==
All tracks are written by Phoenix.

Alphabetical track listing
No.	Title	Length
1.	"Everything Is Everything"	3:01
2.	"Run Run Run"	3:50
3.	"I'm an Actor"	2:33
4.	"Love for Granted"	4:24
5.	"Victim of the Crime"	4:02
6.	"(You Can't Blame It On) Anybody"	3:33
7.	"Congratulations"	1:12
8.	"If It's Not with You"	3:57
9.	"Holdin' on Together"	3:27
10.	"Alphabetical"	3:24
11.	"Congratulations (Revisited)" (iTunes bonus track)	1:08

== Personnel ==
- Deck D'Arcy – bass guitar, keyboards and backing vocals
- Laurent Brancowitz – guitar, keyboards and backing vocals
- Thomas Mars – vocals and drums
- Christian Mazzalai – guitar and backing vocals

Additional musicians

- Ivan Beck – acoustic guitar (4)
- Pino Palladino – bass (5, 7, 10)
- Jm Mery – additional keyboards (7, 8, 10)
- Alex Locascio – drums and percussion (1, 3, 4, 5)

== Charts ==
Chart performance for Alphabetical
Chart (2004)	Peak position
Belgian Albums (Ultratop Flanders)	46
Belgian Alternative Albums (Ultratop Flanders)	19
Belgian Albums (Ultratop Wallonia)	42
French Albums (SNEP)	41
German Albums (Offizielle Top 100)	68
Japanese Albums (Oricon)	265
Norwegian Albums (VG-lista)	4
Swedish Albums (Sverigetopplistan)	11

== Release history ==
Release history and formats for Alphabetical
Country	Date	Label	Format	Catalog
Japan	24 March 2005	Toshiba-EMI	CD	VJCP 68627
Europe; United Kingdom	29 March 2004	Source	LP	SOURLP095
Europe; United Kingdom	29 March 2004	Source	CD	CDSOUR095
France	30 March 2004	Source	CD	
Australia	12 April 2004	Virgin	CD	5986350
United States	27 July 2004	Astralwerks; Source	CD	7243 5 98635 0 4
