= J-Boy =

2017 single by Phoenix

Single by Phoenix

from the album Ti Amo
- Released: 27 April 2017
- Recorded: 2016
- Genre: Indie rock
- Length: 4:08
- Label: Loyauté; Glassnote
- Songwriter: Phoenix
- Producers: Phoenix; Pierrick Devin

Phoenix singles chronology
"Alone on Christmas Day" (2015)	"J-Boy" (2017)	"Ti Amo" (2017)

Music video
- "J-Boy" on YouTube

"J-Boy" is a song by French indie rock band Phoenix, issued as the lead single from their sixth studio album Ti Amo. The song peaked at No. 21 on the Billboard Alternative Songs chart in 2017.

The title stands for the chorus lyric, "Just Because of You".

== Music video ==
The official music video for "J-Boy" was directed by Warren Fu. It shows the band performing the song on a spoof Italian talk show.

== Charts ==
Chart performance for "J-Boy"
Chart (2017)	Peak position
Belgium (Ultratip Bubbling Under Wallonia)	40
Canada Rock (Billboard)	39
France (SNEP)	59
Mexico Ingles Airplay (Billboard)	39
US Hot Rock & Alternative Songs (Billboard)	26
US Rock & Alternative Airplay (Billboard)	26
