= Entertainment (song) =

Single by Phoenix

from the album Bankrupt!
- Released: 19 February 2013
- Recorded: 2011–2012
- Genre: Post-punk revival; synth-pop; new wave
- Length: 3:40
- Label: Loyauté; Glassnote; Atlantic
- Songwriter: Phoenix
- Producer: Phoenix

Phoenix singles chronology
"Lasso" (2009)	"Entertainment" (2013)	"Trying to Be Cool" (2013)

Audio sample
- 20-second sample of Phoenix's "Entertainment": file; help

"Entertainment" is a song by French indie pop band Phoenix. It was released as the lead single from their fifth studio album, Bankrupt!, on 19 February 2013. It premiered a day earlier with airplay on BBC Radio 1's Zane Lowe show. Following the premiere, the single was sent to alternative radio, where it impacted in the United States during the week of 26 February. It was also featured on the soundtrack album of the 2013 American heist thriller film Now You See Me. "Entertainment" notably features a staccato guitar line and an array of synthesisers that culminate to form what some may describe as a slightly oriental-inspired sound. The official remix of the track features vocals from British R&B group Mutya Keisha Siobhan and re-worked production from Dev Hynes.

== Charts ==
=== Weekly charts ===
Chart (2013)	Peak position
Australian Hitseekers Singles (ARIA)	19
Australian Streaming Tracks (ARIA)	39
Belgium (Ultratip Bubbling Under Flanders)	12
Belgium (Ultratip Bubbling Under Wallonia)	29
Canada Rock Songs (Billboard)	20
France (SNEP)	43
Japan Hot 100 (Billboard)	66
Switzerland Airplay (Schweizer Hitparade)	88
UK Singles (Official Charts Company)	177
US Hot Rock Songs (Billboard)	22
US Rock Airplay (Billboard)	19
US Adult Alternative Airplay (Billboard)	16
US Alternative Airplay (Billboard)	11

=== Year-end charts ===
Chart (2013)	Position
US Hot Rock Songs (Billboard)	79
US Alternative Songs (Billboard)	36
