= SycAmour =

American post-hardcore band

- Origin: Ypsilanti, Michigan
- Genres: Post Hardcore, Metalcore, Electronicore
- Years active: 2007–present
- Label: Hopeless Records (2014-2015)
- Members: (see below)
- Past members: (see below)
- Website: http://www.sycamour.com

SycAmour is a post-hardcore band from Ypsilanti, Michigan that was formed in 2010. They were previously signed to Hopeless Records and have released three albums.

== Members ==
=== Current ===
- Jeremy Gilmore - Clean Vocals
- Jacob Liepshutz - Guitar
- Tony Sugent - Unclean Vocals
- Zack Ferrell - Guitar
- Lucas Demers - Bass

=== Former ===
- Charles McCormick - Bass
- Jake Ford - Guitar
- Victor Yousof - Drums
- Blake Howard - Guitar
- Tyler Woods - Bass
- Jake Harris - Guitar

== Discography ==
=== Albums ===
Title	Album details
Obscure: La Deuxième	Released: 6 April 2014 Label: Hopeless Records Format: Digital Download
Indulgence: A Saga of Lights	Released: 2 September 2014 Label: Hopeless Records Format: Digital Download
Substance Abuse	Released: 8 June 2018 Label: N/A Format: Digital Download

=== Singles ===
Title	Release date
Coffee	Aug 21, 2016
Turns You On (Siberian)	Sep 30, 2016
Still (Feel Hollow)	Jan 9, 2026
Feed(777)	March 6, 2026
Crawled	August 14, 2026

== Guest appearances ==
Indulgence: A Saga of Lights - Doubt (feat Phil Druyor)

Indulgence: A Saga of Lights - Composure (feat Trent Woodley)

Dreaming Awake - Friction (feat Jeremy Gilmore)
