= Everything Is Everything (Phoenix song) =

Single by Phoenix

from the album Alphabetical
- Released: 22 March 2004
- Recorded: 2003–2004
- Genre: Pop rock
- Length: 3:01
- Label: Source
- Songwriters: Thomas Pablo Croquet; Christian Mazzalai; Laurent Mazzalai; Frederic Moulin
- Producers: Phoenix; Tony Hoffer

Phoenix singles chronology
"If I Ever Feel Better" (2000)	"Everything Is Everything" (2004)	"Run Run Run" (2004)

Alternative cover
- UK CD single

"Everything Is Everything" is a song by French rock band Phoenix and is featured on their second studio album, Alphabetical. It was released 22 March 2004 in the European Union and Japan as the lead single from that album. It was also released 12 July 2004 as a single from the album in the United Kingdom. It is featured in the music video game Guitar Hero On Tour: Decades, as downloadable content for Guitar Hero 5, and on Six Feet Under, Vol. 2: Everything Ends.

== Track listings ==
=== Europe ===
- Maxi-CD
1. "Everything Is Everything"
2. "I'm an Actor"
3. "Everything Is Everything" (instrumental)
4. "Everything Is Everything" (home demo)

=== UK ===
- 7" SOUR097, CD SOURCD097
1. "Everything Is Everything"
2. "Victim of the Crime"
- Maxi-CD SOURCDX097
1. "Everything Is Everything"
2. "Run Run Run" (SBN Session)
3. "The Diary of Alphabetical" (early demos)
4. "Everything Is Everything" (studio video)

== Charts ==
Chart performance for "Everything Is Everything"
Chart (2004)	Peak position
CIS Airplay (TopHit)	98
Italy (FIMI)	40
Netherlands (Single Top 100)	91
Russia Airplay (TopHit)	80
Ukraine Airplay (TopHit)	107
UK Singles (OCC)	74
