= Tonight (Phoenix song) =

Single by Phoenix featuring Ezra Koenig

from the album Alpha Zulu
- Released: 7 September 2022
- Recorded: 2022
- Studio: Musée des Arts décoratifs, Paris
- Genre: Alternative rock; pop rock
- Length: 4:06
- Label: Loyauté; Glassnote
- Songwriter: Phoenix
- Producer: Phoenix

Phoenix singles chronology
"Alpha Zulu" (2022)	"Tonight" (2022)	"Winter Solstice" (2022)

Music video
- "Tonight" on YouTube

"Tonight" is a song by French band Phoenix, released as the third single from their seventh studio album, Alpha Zulu. It features Ezra Koenig of Vampire Weekend. The song was released on 7 September 2022 alongside its music video, which was filmed in Tokyo and Paris.

The track marks the first time Phoenix have recorded with a guest vocalist.

The band performed the song on several late night talk shows, such as The Late Show with Stephen Colbert and Later... with Jools Holland. The song is used in the football game FIFA 23 and the baseball game MLB The Show 23.

== Charts ==
Chart performance for "Tonight"
Chart (2022–2023)	Peak position
Canada Rock (Billboard)	49
Iceland (RÚV)	28
Japan Hot Overseas (Billboard Japan)	16
Swiss Airplay (Schweizer Hitparade)	74
US Rock & Alternative Airplay (Billboard)	11
US Alternative Songs (Billboard)	10
US Adult Alternative Airplay (Billboard)	1
