= United (Phoenix album) =

Studio album by Phoenix
- Released: 8 June 2000
- Recorded: 1999–2000
- Studio: Studio Gan; Studio 2 Studio PlusXXX
- Genre: Indie pop; pop rock
- Length: 38:48
- Label: Virgin; Astralwerks; Source
- Producer: Phoenix; Philippe Zdar

Phoenix chronology
United (2000)	Alphabetical (2004)

Singles from United
- 1. "Party Time" Released: 1999; 2. "Too Young" Released: 29 May 2000; 3. "If I Ever Feel Better" Released: 1 June 2000

United is the debut studio album by French indie pop band Phoenix, released in 2000. Singles released from the album include "Too Young", "If I Ever Feel Better" and "Party Time".

== Critical reception ==
Professional ratings
Review scores
Source	Rating
AllMusic	3.5/5 stars
The Guardian	3/5 stars
The List	5/5 stars
NME	8/10
Pitchfork	8.6/10
Q	4/5 stars
Rolling Stone	3.5/5 stars
Spin	7/10

United received generally positive reviews from critics. Catherine Bromley of The List gave the album a perfect score, praising the album's diverse sound over the sound of "the Gallic house propagated by their contemporaries". Pitchfork gave the album an 8.6 out of 10, calling it "one of the most confoundingly brilliant debuts of the year, the type of album that thwarts expectations while affirming music's overwhelming capacity to amaze." Jason Birchmeier of AllMusic called it "an uncanny yet earnest showcase of what makes pop/rock pop without the gaudy trendiness that now makes the 1980s seem so distasteful."

== Commercial performance ==
According to Virgin France, as of April 2004, the album has shipped 150,000 units worldwide.

== Track listing ==
All tracks are written by Phoenix.

No.	Title	Length
1.	"School's Rules"	1:32
2.	"Too Young"	3:19
3.	"Honeymoon"	5:00
4.	"If I Ever Feel Better"	4:26
5.	"Party Time"	2:14
6.	"On Fire"	2:49
7.	"Embuscade"	3:57
8.	"Summer Days"	3:15
9.	"Funky Squaredance": "Part One"; "Part Two"; "Part Three"	9:38
10.	"Definitive Breaks"	1:40

US/iTunes bonus track

No.	Title	Length
11.	"Too Young" (Zoot Woman Remix)	3:53

== Personnel ==
Phoenix

- Laurent Brancowitz
- Christian Mazzalai
- Deck d'Arcy
- Thomas Mars Jr.

Additional musicians

- Rob – clavinet ("School's Rules", "Too Young", "If I Ever Feel Better", "Embuscade")
- Cubain – percussion ("Too Young", "Honeymoon", "On Fire", "Embuscade")
- Sandrine Longuet – harp ("Honeymoon")
- Jean-Philippe Dary – clavinet ("On Fire")
- Julia and Oliza – backing vocals ("On Fire")
- Camille Baz Baz – Hammond organ ("On Fire")
- Hugo Ferran – saxophone ("On Fire", "Embuscade", "Definitive Breaks"), string and horn arrangement ("Embuscade", "Summer Days")
- Andrew Crocker – trumpet ("On Fire", "Embuscade")
- Thomas Bangalter – Yamaha CS-60 synthesizer ("Embuscade")
- Paddy Sherlock – trombone ("Embuscade")
- P. Nadal – strings conductor ("Embuscade", "Summer Days")
- Marlon - drums ("Summer Days", "Funky Squaredance Part One")
- Eddie Efira – pedal steel ("Summer Days", "Funky Squaredance Part One")
- Bryce de la Menardière – Epinette ("Funky Squaredance Part One")
- The Love Choral Society – screams ("Funky Squaredance Part Two")
- Morgan – Hammond organ and Wurlitzer ("Funky Squaredance Part Two")
- Pedro Winter – Rapman synthesizer ("Funky Squaredance Part Two")
- Noe Efira – lead guitar ("Funky Squaredance Part Three")
- The Arcysian Vocal Ensemble – vocals ("Funky Squaredance Part Three")
- The Hector Berliz Choir – vocals ("Funky Squaredance Part Three")
- Jean-Claude Soubeyrand – conductor ("Funky Squaredance Part Three)
- Junior Carrera – guitar ("Definitive Breaks")

Production and design

- Phoenix – production, mixing ("Definitive Breaks")
- Stephane Briat a.k.a. Alf – production, recording, mixing ("Embuscade")
- Alex Firla – production, recording
- Philippe Zdar – mixing (all tracks except "Embuscade", "Party Time", and "Definitive Breaks")
- Jean-Paul Gonnod – mixing ("Too Young")
- Julian Delfaud – mixing ("Party Time", "Definitive Breaks")
- Mike March – mastering
- Alexandre Courtès – cover design
- Félix Lahrer – cover photograph

== Charts ==
Chart performance for United
Year	Chart	Peak position
2001	French Albums (SNEP)	90
2004	Norwegian Albums (VG-lista)	37
