= It's Never Been Like That =

Studio album by Phoenix
- Released: 15 May 2006
- Recorded: August – November 2005
- Studio: Planet Roc (Berlin, Germany); Acousti (Paris)
- Genre: Indie pop; indie rock; garage rock; post-punk revival
- Length: 36:54
- Label: Virgin; EMI; Astralwerks
- Producer: Phoenix

Phoenix chronology
Live! Thirty Days Ago (2004)	It's Never Been Like That (2006)	Wolfgang Amadeus Phoenix (2009)

Singles from It's Never Been Like That
- 1. "Long Distance Call" Released: 8 May 2006; 2. "Consolation Prizes" Released: 11 September 2006

It's Never Been Like That is the third studio album by French band Phoenix, released on 15 May 2006 through Virgin Records and EMI internationally and Astralwerks in the United States. The album was preceded by the release of the singles "Long Distance Call" and "Consolation Prizes". The album was later re-released in Mexico as a tour edition with four bonus tracks recorded live in Oslo on 20 April 2006.

== Commercial performance ==
As of 2013, sales in the United States have exceeded 92,000 copies, according to Nielsen SoundScan.

== Critical reception ==
Professional ratings
Aggregate scores
Source	Rating
Metacritic	72/100
Review scores
Source	Rating
AllMusic	3.5/5 stars
The A.V. Club	A
Entertainment Weekly	B
NME	6/10
The Observer	4/5 stars
Pitchfork	8.0/10
Q	3/5 stars
Rolling Stone	4/5 stars
Slant Magazine	4/5 stars
Spin	3/5 stars

It's Never Been Like That was rated number 13 in Pitchfork's Top 50 Albums of 2006 and 38 in their Top Albums of the 2000s.

== Track listing ==
All tracks are written by Phoenix.

It's Never Been Like That track listing
No.	Title	Length
1.	"Napoleon Says"	3:13
2.	"Consolation Prizes"	3:16
3.	"Rally"	3:17
4.	"Long Distance Call"	3:04
5.	"One Time Too Many"	3:40
6.	"Lost and Found"	2:56
7.	"Courtesy Laughs"	3:14
8.	"North"	5:01
9.	"Sometimes in the Fall"	5:49
10.	"Second to None"	3:25
11.	"Diet of the Heart" (iTunes bonus track)	1:03

Mexican tour edition / 2006 Virgin Music (France) edition bonus tracks
No.	Title	Length
11.	"Napoleon Says" (live)	3:23
12.	"Rally" (live)	3:18
13.	"Sometimes in the Fall" (live)	6:07
14.	"Second to None" (live)	6:29

Notes

- This edition of the album is referred to as the "New Edition". It was released in France and on tour in Mexico back in 2006, but is now being sold as a 2009 release in the US.
- The live tracks were recorded in Oslo Hackney, Hackney, England on 20 April 2006.

== Charts ==
Chart performance for It's Never Been Like That
Chart (2006)	Peak position
Australian Albums (ARIA)	81
Austrian Albums (Ö3 Austria)	74
Belgian Albums (Ultratop Flanders)	86
Belgian Alternative Albums (Ultratop Flanders)	50
Belgian Albums (Ultratop Wallonia)	89
French Albums (SNEP)	34
German Albums (Offizielle Top 100)	41
Japanese Albums (Oricon)	118
Norwegian Albums (VG-lista)	14
Swedish Albums (Sverigetopplistan)	18
Swiss Albums (Schweizer Hitparade)	66
UK Albums (OCC)	108
US Top Heatseeker Albums (Billboard)	23

== Release history ==
Release history and formats for It's Never Been Like That
Country	Date	Label	Format	Catalog
Japan	10 May 2006	Toshiba-EMI	CD	TOCP-66575
United Kingdom Europe	15 May 2006	Virgin/EMI	LP	SOURLP123 / 0946 3 55716 1 5
United Kingdom Europe	15 May 2006	Virgin/EMI	CD	CDSOUR123 / 0946 3 60910 2 0
United States	23 May 2006	Astralwerks	LP	ASW-55716 / 0946 3 55716 1 5
United States	23 May 2006	Astralwerks	CD	ASW-60911 / 0946 3 60911 2 9
Canada	13 June 2006	Arts & Crafts	CD	AC018
