= Bankrupt! =

Studio album by Phoenix
- Released: 19 April 2013
- Recorded: 2011–2012
- Studios: D'Herbécourt (Paris); Motorbass (Paris); Oscilloscope (New York City)
- Genres: Indie pop; synth-pop; new wave
- Length: 40:35
- Labels: Loyauté; Glassnote; Atlantic
- Producers: Phoenix; Philippe Zdar

Phoenix chronology
Wolfgang Amadeus Phoenix (2009)	Bankrupt! (2013)	Ti Amo (2017)

Singles from Bankrupt!
- 1. "Entertainment" Released: 18 February 2013; 2. "Trying to Be Cool" Released: 8 July 2013; 3. "S.O.S. in Bel Air" Released: 11 November 2013

Bankrupt! is the fifth studio album by French band Phoenix, first released on 19 April 2013 through Loyauté, Glassnote, and Atlantic Records. It is the band's follow up to Wolfgang Amadeus Phoenix, which was released four years earlier in 2009. The album was produced by the band with Philippe Zdar and was recorded in a span of two years at Studios d'Herbécourt and Motorbass Studios in Paris, France, and at Oscilloscope Laboratories in New York City, United States. The album received generally favorable reviews from music critics upon release. It debuted at number 3 on the French Albums Chart, number 4 on the Billboard 200 (selling 50,000 copies), and number 14 on the UK Albums Chart.

Three official singles were released from the album: "Entertainment", "Trying to Be Cool", and "S.O.S. in Bel Air".

== Writing and composition ==
On 5 April 2011, Phoenix posted a blog update on their website revealing CCTV stills of a studio where the band was working. The band stated in interviews that the album would be a departure from the pop sounds of Wolfgang Amadeus Phoenix (2009), and they were trying to create something more experimental. The band also said that their work on the soundtrack for Sofia Coppola's 2010 film Somewhere provided inspiration for the creation of the album. Bankrupt! has been described as an indie pop album, also featuring synth-pop and new wave throughout. Stereogum compared its production values to those of OMD's early albums.

== Promotion ==
Glassnote head Daniel Glass announced at a Spotify event on 6 December 2012 that the band had finished recording their new album, and it was scheduled for an April 2013 release. On 16 January 2013, the album's title was revealed to be Bankrupt! and a teaser was released on Phoenix's official website.

Phoenix played various major music festivals across the world in support of the album. Dates included headlining spots at Coachella Valley Music and Arts Festival and Primavera Sound. They also played large European festivals such as Rock Werchter, Rock am Ring and Rock im Park and Glastonbury Festival.

The album's lead single, "Entertainment", premiered on Zane Lowe's show on BBC Radio 1 on 18 February 2013, and was released digitally the following day.

The second single, "Trying to Be Cool", was initially promoted via Soundcloud, with several remixes available for download. On 2 July 2013 a video for the song was released, with a live performance of "Trying to Be Cool" and "Drakkar Noir" in a studio in New York City. The video was directed by Spanish collective "Canada" and produced by Phoenix in conjunction with Intel and Vice's 'The Creators Project'. "S.O.S. in Bel Air" impacted alternative radio in the United States as the third and final single from Bankrupt! on 11 November 2013.

== Critical reception ==
Professional ratings
Aggregate scores
Source	Rating
AnyDecentMusic?	7.2/10
Metacritic	71/100
Review scores
Source	Rating
AllMusic	4/5 stars
The A.V. Club	B−
Chicago Tribune	3/4 stars
Entertainment Weekly	B+
The Guardian	4/5 stars
The Independent	4/5 stars
NME	7/10
Pitchfork	7.5/10
Rolling Stone	3.5/5 stars
Spin	8/10

Bankrupt! received mostly positive ratings from most music critics. At Metacritic, which assigns a weighted average score out of 100 to ratings and reviews from mainstream critics, the album received a metascore of 71, based on 41 reviews. AllMusic's Heather Phares highlighted that the album "isn't nearly as devoid of new ideas as its title suggests, but it doesn't feel like quite the leap forward Wolfgang was compared to what came before it. Not that it necessarily needs to be" because it "lets them celebrate with a victory lap that's enjoyable for all concerned." At Chicago Tribune, Greg Kot found that it is more "cohesive than its best-selling predecessor." Reef Younis of Clash rated the effort an 8 out of 10, and told that the album is "as meticulous, likeable, and danceable as its predecessors."

At Consequence of Sound, Steven Arroyo stated that Bankrupt! "could end up the most anti-pop pop album of the year" and although it has its confusing "fake-out" moments, "if the choice was between confusing or boring and safe, Phoenix made the right call." Drowned in Sound's Krystina Nellis rated the album a 9 out of 10, and alluded to how the album may be a "shock to the system at first", but called the process of listening to the album a "thrilling ride nonetheless". Simon Price music critic for The Independent called the album "derivative and is a near hybrid of Mew, the Postal Service, M83 and Empire of the Sun, but it's perfectly likeable without ever inspiring outright love." At Los Angeles Times, Randall Roberts found the album to be "hardly groundbreaking" because it "feels like a predictable progression, too logical an evolution", yet the release "succeeds despite its verbal elusiveness." John Murphy of musicOMH wrote that the release was "well worth waiting for."

NME's Matthew Horton rated the release a 7 out of 10, and noted that the album has been "buffed and polished", which will edge the band "towards the big time" because "their own flashy banks of synths and treated guitars sound meaty and perfect together". Stuart Berman of Pitchfork rated the album 7.5 out of 10, and evoked that the album "doesn't so much ruefully reflect upon Phoenix's whirlwind, globe-trotting lifestyle as drop you right in the middle of it." At Rolling Stone, Jon Dolan called Bankrupt! an album "rich with colorful, astral-planing synths, wry guitar shimmer, pillow-pump drums and Thomas Mars' blue-eyed vocal swoon". David Bevan of Spin rated the album an 8 out of 10, and affirmed that "the resulting album blurs the lines between simple and sophisticated more effectively than Phoenix ever have before." This Is Fake DIY's Danny Wright rated the album an 8 out of 10, and felt that the album "can seem like a sidestep. But delve deeper and this is an album reveals itself as a gem; one which mixes their crowd-pleasing hooks with an inventive shift in their sound." At Under the Radar, Dan Lucas noted how the album "will sound familiar to the band's fans from the off, but also represents the first significant aesthetic shift in their oeuvre", and the release "suggests that the rest of the world has a lot of catching up to do."

However, Philip Cosores of Paste rated the album a 6.0 out of 10, and found that the album "is easy to excuse, only to the effect that the more you excuse its deficiencies, the more you realize you are making excuses for it. Little is bad, but little is memorable or exciting or even interesting." At The Observer, Kitty Empire called the album a "classy, occasionally experimental set informed by breezy 80s sounds and vintage synths", which "it could have suited any number of other, cooler Coachellists in situ", and that it is "perhaps, a textbook post-success album." Kevin Korber of PopMatters rated the release a 6 out of 10, and evoked how the album is "ultimately underwhelming" because the effort does not have anything "going on", but the project "still works as a solid effort from a band getting used to being big. They’re just doing what they do." Slant Magazine's Mark Collett found that the "lightness of touch, however, is otherwise missing", which makes the album "cool and pleasant, but easy to forget." At Mojo, Stephen Worthy said "the French quartet can be forgiven for not messing with the formula here."

== Track listing ==
All tracks are written by Phoenix.

Bankrupt! track listing
No.	Title	Length
1.	"Entertainment"	3:40
2.	"The Real Thing"	3:22
3.	"S.O.S. in Bel Air"	3:43
4.	"Trying to Be Cool"	3:48
5.	"Bankrupt!"	6:57
6.	"Drakkar Noir"	3:22
7.	"Chloroform"	4:04
8.	"Don't"	3:16
9.	"Bourgeois"	4:53
10.	"Oblique City"	3:30

Disc two, deluxe edition – The Bankrupt! Diaries
No.	Title	Length
1.	"Cabourg"	1:12
2.	"Just Trying to Be Cool"	0:36
3.	"L'Heure Bleue"	0:27
4.	"L'Aventure"	1:18
5.	"Versus Monteverdi"	0:42
6.	"François"	1:43
7.	"Labyrinthe"	1:14
8.	"Vésuve II"	1:04
9.	"Campo Marzio 4"	1:19
10.	"Cité d'Or Fondations"	1:47
11.	"Cité d'Or"	0:46
12.	"Baccalauréat"	0:30
13.	"Police"	0:29
14.	"Helmut"	1:06
15.	"Vladimir"	0:16
16.	"Cité d'Or II"	0:53
17.	"Le Rouge aux Lèvres"	0:51
18.	"Dolomites"	0:56
19.	"J'ai Tout Donné"	0:32
20.	"Bruce"	0:32
21.	"Nanonana Nuage"	0:44
22.	"Drakkar"	1:32
23.	"RMI Florian"	0:47
24.	"Belinda au Soleil"	0:52
25.	"Belinda"	0:50
26.	"Nanopico"	0:46
27.	"Triangle 3"	1:11
28.	"Belinda Wurlitzer"	0:35
29.	"Giorgio 2"	0:53
30.	"Lin Bleu"	0:44
31.	"Rimini-Antibes"	1:05
32.	"Batobus"	0:44
33.	"Scouts d'Europe"	0:48
34.	"Nanomanioc"	0:33
35.	"Je T'Aime"	0:47
36.	"Epsilon 12"	0:32
37.	"Été Pourri"	1:04
38.	"Biblos"	0:32
39.	"Jeunesse"	1:04
40.	"Blue Lagoon"	0:40
41.	"Taxi G7"	0:47
42.	"Ex-Aequo"	0:40
43.	"Ragazzi"	0:53
44.	"Drill"	1:04
45.	"Rimini Sous la Douche"	0:53
46.	"Chimie"	0:31
47.	"Hedlunda 2"	0:46
48.	"33cl"	0:59
49.	"Virgule XII"	0:54
50.	"Majordome"	0:37
51.	"Oblique"	1:00
52.	"Amphores"	0:55
53.	"Lin Bleu Dans le Métro"	1:01
54.	"Entertainer"	0:29
55.	"Mindgames"	0:52
56.	"Prince des Collines"	0:42
57.	"Aristotle"	0:01
58.	"Le Main de Dieu"	3:09
59.	"Aristotelian"	0:01
60.	"Vendredi"	0:19
61.	"Anthracite"	0:57
62.	"Amalfi"	1:05
63.	"Le Synthé Pleure"	1:31
64.	"4 Bits Adaggio"	0:59
65.	"24 Carats"	1:36
66.	"Invisible"	0:45
67.	"UGC Ciné Cité"	0:39
68.	"Negroni"	0:40
69.	"Chloroform Berceau"	0:51
70.	"Hedlunda"	1:03
71.	"Cité d'Or de Facto"	1:54

== Personnel ==
Credits for Bankrupt! adapted from liner notes.

Phoenix

- Phoenix – production
- Thomas Mars – lead vocals
- Laurent Brancowitz – guitar, keyboards, percussion, programming, backing vocals, artwork concept
- Christian Mazzalai – guitar, keyboards, programming, backing vocals
- Deck D'Arcy – bass, keyboards, piano, percussion, programming, treatments, backing vocals

Additional personnel

- Michael Askill – mallets, percussion ("Entertainment", "Bankrupt!")
- Laurent d'Herbécourt – extra drums ("Trying to Be Cool"); engineering (all tracks)
- Maître Dierstein – technical engineering
- Maître Guy Foucher – technical engineering
- Ben Garvie – cover, illustration
- Thomas Hedlund – drums, sampled drums
- Robin Coudert – piano, keyboards
- George Jarvis – custom effects unit
- Andre Kelman – additional engineering
- Cameron Kennedy – mallets, percussion ("Entertainment", "Bankrupt!")
- Stéphane Kim – technical engineering
- Rebecca Lloyd-Jones – mallets, percussion ("Entertainment", "Bankrupt!")
- Mike Marsh – mastering
- Erik Mikalsen – custom effects unit
- Steph Mudford – mallets, percussion ("Entertainment", "Bankrupt!")
- Cedric Plancy – flute ("Bankrupt!")
- SM Associati – art direction
- Pascal Teixeira – artwork concept
- Julien Torb – additional engineering, mixing assistant
- Bastien Vandevelde – extra drums ("Bankrupt!"); additional engineering, mixing assistant (all tracks)
- Zdar – extra drums ("Bourgeois"); additional engineering, mixing, production (all tracks)

== Charts ==
=== Weekly charts ===
Weekly chart performance for Bankrupt!
Chart (2013)	Peak position
Australian Albums (ARIA)	5
Austrian Albums (Ö3 Austria)	31
Belgian Albums (Ultratop Flanders)	21
Belgian Albums (Ultratop Wallonia)	22
Canadian Albums (Billboard)	4
Danish Albums (Hitlisten)	34
Dutch Albums (Album Top 100)	57
French Albums (SNEP)	3
German Albums (Offizielle Top 100)	18
Irish Albums (IRMA)	10
Japanese Albums (Oricon)	18
New Zealand Albums (RMNZ)	27
Norwegian Albums (VG-lista)	33
Scottish Albums (Official Charts)	17
South Korean Albums (Gaon)	94
Spanish Albums (Promusicae)	48
Swiss Albums (Schweizer Hitparade)	22
UK Albums (Official Charts)	14
US Billboard 200	4
US Top Alternative Albums (Billboard)	1
US Independent Albums (Billboard)	1
US Top Rock Albums (Billboard)	1

=== Year-end charts ===
Year-end chart performance for Bankrupt!
Chart (2013)	Position
French Albums (SNEP)	143

== Release history ==
Release history and formats for Bankrupt!
Region	Date	Label
Australia	19 April 2013	Liberation Music
Germany	19 April 2013	Warner Music
Netherlands	19 April 2013	Warner Music
Ireland	19 April 2013	Loyauté, Glassnote Records, Atlantic Records
United Kingdom	22 April 2013	Loyauté, Glassnote Records, Atlantic Records
France	22 April 2013	Loyauté
Canada	23 April 2013	Glassnote Records
United States	23 April 2013	Loyauté, Glassnote Records
Japan	24 April 2013	Warner Music
Italy	14 May 2013	Warner Music
