= Wolfgang Amadeus Phoenix =

Studio album by Phoenix
- Released: 25 May 2009
- Recorded: 2008
- Studio: Motorbass (Paris)
- Genres: Indie pop; indie rock; pop rock; synth-pop; electronic rock; sophisti-pop; new wave
- Length: 36:23
- Labels: V2; Loyauté; Glassnote; Co-Op
- Producers: Phoenix; Philippe Zdar

Phoenix chronology
It's Never Been Like That (2006)	Wolfgang Amadeus Phoenix (2009)	Bankrupt! (2013)

Singles from Wolfgang Amadeus Phoenix
- 1. "1901" Released: 23 February 2009; 2. "Lisztomania" Released: 7 July 2009; 3. "Lasso" Released: 6 March 2010; 4. "Fences" Released: 17 April 2010; 5. "Armistice" Released: 16 August 2010

Wolfgang Amadeus Phoenix is the fourth studio album by French band Phoenix, it was released on 25 May 2009 through V2 Records, Loyauté, Glassnote, and Cooperative Music. While the band's previous work enjoyed a moderate underground following, Wolfgang Amadeus Phoenix drew the attention of a more mainstream audience. In the US, Phoenix began a promotional tour including performances on several late night talk shows. Wolfgang Amadeus Phoenix continued to gain momentum with the increased exposure of the tour. The album received critical acclaim with many publications calling it one of the best albums of 2009. Wolfgang Amadeus Phoenix earned the band a Grammy Award for Best Alternative Music Album at the 52nd Grammy Awards held on 31 January 2010.

== Background ==
The album credits Phoenix band members Thomas Mars on vocals, Deck D'Arcy on bass, and Laurent Brancowitz and Christian Mazzalai on guitar. Phillipe Zdar produced and mixed the album and played drums on the song "Fences", with Cult of Luna drummer Thomas Hedlund playing drums on the majority of the album. Phoenix produced 10 songs for release on the album in the US and Canada under the Glassnote label.

The album name plays off of Wolfgang Amadeus Mozart, using his first and middle name and replacing his last with the band's name "Phoenix". Of the name, Phoenix, Thomas Mars says, "The album title is almost like a childish thing, like you're unleashing a child into the museum and he draws a mustache on the Mona Lisa or something ... It's kind of bratty, especially with me, my mom is German and Mozart is Austrian and in Germany it's like messing with the Pope or something."

== Writing and composition ==
Wolfgang Amadeus Phoenix has been described as a pop rock, indie pop, synth-pop, new wave, sophisti-pop, and electronic rock album. Co-producer Philippe Zdar hosted the recording of the album from his home studio in Paris. During the production of the album, the band recorded video of the sessions, which they have released as mini documentaries of their journey to create Wolfgang Amadeus Phoenix. The videos are available on the band's website.

Throughout the process, lead singer Thomas Mars, noted the use of Oblique Strategies flash cards to promote his creative thinking during the development of the album.

Reviewer Andrew Winistorfer said of the album, "'Wolfgang Amadeus Phoenix' opens with two monster singles, 'Lisztomania', a glittery anthem that manufactures a sense that you're in for greatness and an immense motion that gets more urgent as the song progresses, and '1901', a synth-washed heartfelt ode from frontman Thomas Mars about falling in love."

"Lisztomania" refers to the term 'Lisztomania', a word coined by the German romantic writer Heinrich Heine to describe the massive public response to Franz Liszt's virtuosic piano performances.

The third single, "Lasso", is one of the few songs in which the band has utilized a guitar solo. The opening drumbeat, fast-paced toms and the drumroll in the chorus were played on a synthesizer by Mars, who was a drummer at a young age.

== Promotion and release ==
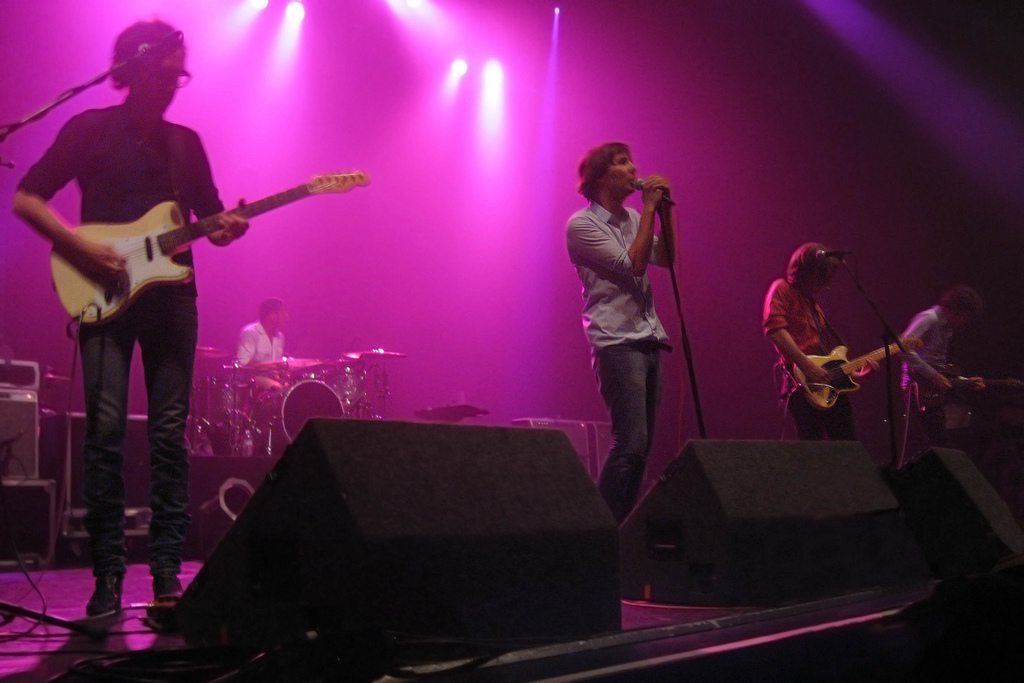
Phoenix on tour for the album Wolfgang Amadeus Phoenix at the "Wiltern Theatre" in Los Angeles, 28 June 2009.

It was announced in early 2009 that the band would be releasing an album. The first single "1901" was released 23 February 2009.

In order to get fans interested in the album the band released an EP version of the album that was only available through iTunes. The EP featured both songs that were performed on SNL and two others; "Love Like a Sunset pt 1 & 2". On 25 May 2009 the album was released on V2 records in conjunction with Loyauté the band's own record label worldwide and on Glassnote in the United States of America.

From 12 May 2009, the album was available to download from the iTunes Store for customers in North America and from Amazon MP3.

On 7 August 2009, Phoenix performed a live version of "Lisztomania" on Australian youth radio network Triple J in a program called "Like a Version".

On 9 October 2009, Phoenix performed "Girlfriend" on The Late Late Show with Craig Ferguson.

== Reception ==
Professional ratings
Aggregate scores
Source	Rating
AnyDecentMusic?	7.4/10
Metacritic	82/100
Review scores
Source	Rating
AllMusic	4.5/5 stars
The A.V. Club	A
Chicago Tribune	3.5/4 stars
Entertainment Weekly	A−
The Guardian	3/5 stars
NME	8/10
Pitchfork	8.5/10
Q	4/5 stars
Rolling Stone	4/5 stars
Spin	7/10

In Australia, the album debuted at number 13. It debuted on the US Billboard 200 albums chart at No. 37 and remained in the Top 100 for several weeks due to the alternative radio success of the album's singles "1901" and "Lisztomania". It has sold 721,000 copies in the US as of April 2013.

The album won the Grammy Award for Best Alternative Music Album on 31 January 2010.

Year-end list entries

- 5th – Time's Top 10 Albums of 2009
- 3rd – Rolling Stone: The 25 Best Albums of 2009
- 8th – Pitchfork's Top 50 Albums of 2009
- 1st – The A.V. Club: The top 25 albums of 2009
- 1st – Drowned in Sound's Top 50 Albums of 2009
- 2nd – Rhapsody: "The 25 Best Albums of 2009"
- 3rd – Spin's The 40 Best Albums of 2009
- 2nd – The Village Voice's Pazz & Jop poll for 2009

"Lisztomania" and "1901" were both listed on Triple J's Hottest 100 for 2009, and received No. 4 and No. 13 respectively.

== Track listing ==
No.	Title	Length
1.	"Lisztomania"	4:01
2.	"1901"	3:13
3.	"Fences"	3:45
4.	"Love Like a Sunset (Part I)"	5:39
5.	"Love Like a Sunset (Part II)"	1:57
6.	"Lasso"	2:48
7.	"Rome"	4:38
8.	"Countdown"	3:57
9.	"Girlfriend"	3:24
10.	"Armistice"	3:05

Special edition box set bonus remix CD

No.	Title	Remix artist	Length
1.	"Lisztomania"	Alex Metric	5:08
2.	"Fences"	The Soft Pack	4:19
3.	"1901 Bo Flex'd"	Passion Pit	4:14
4.	"Lasso"	Two Door Cinema Club	2:53
5.	"Fences"	25 Hrs a Day	4:05
6.	"1901"	L'Aiglon	3:12
7.	"Love Like a Sunset"	Turzi	4:31
8.	"Fences"	Boombass	6:54
9.	"Lisztomania"	25 Hrs a Day	5:36
10.	"Fences"	Friendly Fires	5:11
11.	"Armistice"	Yacht	4:38
12.	"Girlfriend"	Young Fathers	4:20
13.	"Fences"	Chairlift	4:06
14.	"Rome"	Neighbours (with Devendra Banhart)	4:54
15.	"Love Like a Sunset (Deakins Jam)"	Animal Collective	4:07

The Wolfgang Diaries – Side A (bonus box set vinyl)
No.	Title	Length
1.	"Digital Outro"	1:09
2.	"Rue de Rome"	0:33
3.	"1902"	0:56
4.	"Addis-Abeba"	0:33
5.	"1st Countdown"	0:30
6.	"S.A.T"	1:13
7.	"Carusso"	0:34
8.	"Planetarium"	1:46
9.	"Behants"	0:33
10.	"Early Fences"	0:28
11.	"Nord-Quest"	0:55
12.	"Calcutta"	0:42
13.	"Descente Baroque"	0:45
14.	"Concorde"	0:42
15.	"Armistice Fin"	0:51
16.	"Au Chant du Coq"	1:08
17.	"Jean-Louis"	0:21
18.	"Shuttle"	0:57
19.	"Respiration Delta"	0:41
20.	"Reichstag 1"	0:10
21.	"Early Rome"	0:36
22.	"Typewriter"	0:20
23.	"Coyote"	0:35
24.	"We Were Young"	0:32
25.	"Coyote Ad Lib"	0:58

The Wolfgang Diaries – Side B (bonus box set vinyl)
No.	Title	Length
1.	"Planetarium Adn"	1:40
2.	"Raspail"	0:38
3.	"Lisztomania Piano"	0:22
4.	"Exel SG"	0:28
5.	"No Fish n' Chips"	0:40
6.	"Goldbergs"	0:11
7.	"I Love Pi"	0:23
8.	"Reichstag 2"	1:32
9.	"Rome Signal"	0:36
10.	"Superposition Reich"	1:59
11.	"Tappin Bros"	0:27
12.	"Tunnel"	0:56
13.	"Planetarium Ex"	0:29
14.	"Basse Trille Clave"	0:34
15.	"Sonic B"	1:23
16.	"Martyrs"	0:30
17.	"Concorde Encore"	0:37
18.	"Wooden Block"	0:14
19.	"Zenith"	0:34
20.	"Shuttle 2"	0:36
21.	"Beat Colbert"	0:22
22.	"Tunnel Archange"	1:59
23.	"Reichstag 3"	0:38

== Personnel ==
- Thomas Mars – vocals
- Deck d'Arcy – bass, keyboards
- Laurent Brancowitz – guitar, keyboards
- Christian Mazzalai – guitar
- Thomas Hedlund – drums, drum samples, sampling

== Charts ==
=== Weekly charts ===
Chart (2009–2010)	Peak position
Australian Albums (ARIA)	13
Austrian Albums (Ö3 Austria)	66
Belgian Albums (Ultratop Flanders)	27
Belgian Albums (Ultratop Wallonia)	22
Canadian Albums (Billboard)	19
French Albums (SNEP)	14
German Albums (Offizielle Top 100)	18
Irish Albums (IRMA)	64
Japanese Albums (Oricon)	41
Norwegian Albums (VG-lista)	39
Scottish Albums (Official Charts)	91
Swedish Albums (Sverigetopplistan)	34
Swiss Albums (Schweizer Hitparade)	23
UK Albums (Official Charts)	54
US Billboard 200	37
US Top Alternative Albums (Billboard)	4
US Independent Albums (Billboard)	2
US Top Rock Albums (Billboard)	5

=== Year-end charts ===
Chart (2009)	Position
French Albums (SNEP)	141
US Billboard 200	177
US Independent Albums (Billboard)	8
US Top Rock Albums (Billboard)	41
Chart (2010)	Position
French Albums (SNEP)	173
US Billboard 200	96
US Independent Albums (Billboard)	6
US Top Rock Albums (Billboard)	26
Chart (2011)	Position
US Independent Albums (Billboard)	42

== Certifications and sales ==
Certifications and sales for Wolfgang Amadeus Phoenix
Region	Certification	Certified units/sales
Australia (ARIA)	Gold	35,000^{^}
Canada (Music Canada)	Gold	40,000^{^}
France	—	50,000
New Zealand (RMNZ)	Gold	7,500^{‡}
United Kingdom (BPI)	Silver	60,000^{‡}
United States (RIAA)	Gold	721,000
Summaries
Worldwide	—	1,000,000
^{^} Shipments figures based on certification alone.^{‡} Sales+streaming figures based on certification alone.
