= Phoenix (French band) =

French indie pop band

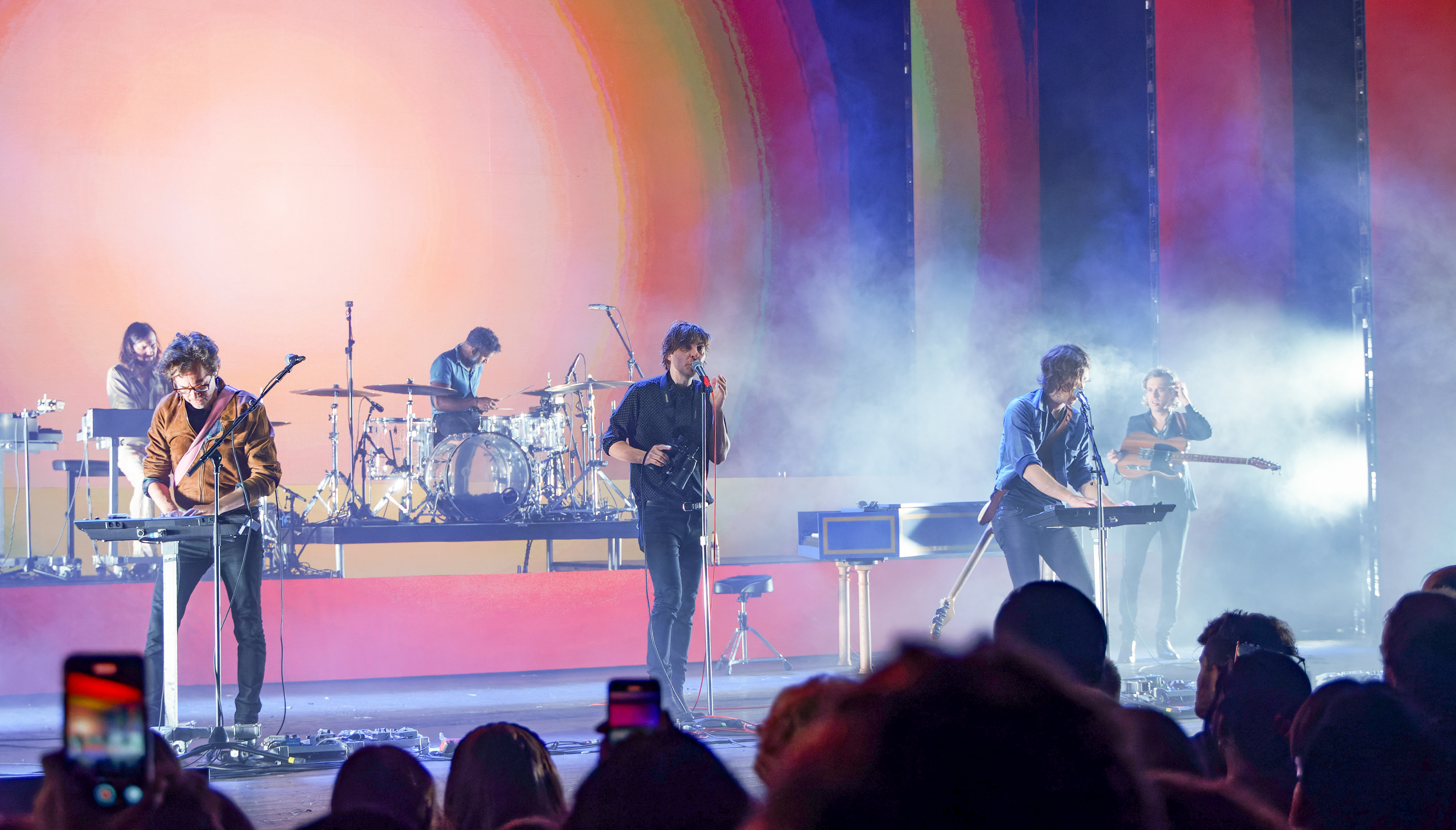
- Phoenix in concert at Brixton Academy in London (2022)

Background information
- Origin: Versailles, Ile-de-France, France
- Genres: Indie pop; synth-pop; pop rock; new wave
- Years active: 1995–present
- Labels: Glassnote; Loyauté; Atlantic; V2; Source; Virgin; Astralwerks; EMI; Ghettoblaster
- Member of: UFOs
- Spinoff of: Darlin'
- Members: Thomas Mars; Deck d'Arcy; Laurent Brancowitz; Christian Mazzalai
- Website: www.wearephoenix.com

Phoenix is a French rock band from Versailles, formed in 1995. Their line-up, which has remained unchanged since their formation, comprises Thomas Mars (lead vocals, drums, percussion), Deck d'Arcy (bass, keyboards, backing vocals), Christian Mazzalai (guitar, backing vocals) and Laurent Brancowitz (guitar, keyboards, backing vocals). Thomas Hedlund has been the band's session and live drummer since 2005.

The band's sound has been primarily described as indie pop, synth-pop, pop rock, and new wave. They have released seven studio albums, to date, with their fourth album, Wolfgang Amadeus Phoenix, becoming a major breakthrough success in 2009. Featuring the singles "1901" and "Lisztomania", the album won a Grammy Award for Best Alternative Music Album. With the release of the band's fifth album, Bankrupt! (2013), the band headlined Coachella and Primavera Sound. The album was a commercial success, debuting at number 3 on the French Albums Chart and number 4 on the Billboard 200.

The band's Italo disco-influenced sixth studio album, Ti Amo, was released in 2017 and featured songs that celebrated the band's "European, Latin roots". The band's seventh studio album, Alpha Zulu (2022), was recorded within the Louvre Palace during the COVID-19 pandemic, and was inspired by the death of the band's longtime producer, friend and mentor Philippe Zdar.

The band performed at the 2024 Summer Olympics closing ceremony held at the Stade de France in Paris, France. They performed the 2010 track "Nightcall" in collaboration with French electronic pop artist Kavinsky and Belgian singer Angèle as well as "Tonight" with Vampire Weekend frontman Ezra Koenig. Phoenix formed the supergroup UFOs with Braxe + Falcon, which released their debut single "UFO" in 2025.

== History ==
=== Formation and early years ===
Phoenix was conceived in the 1990s when vocalist Thomas Mars, bassist Deck d'Arcy, and guitarist Chris Mazzalai, who were all friends in school, started playing together as a "garage band" based out of Mars's house in Versailles. In 1995, Laurent Brancowitz, Mazzalai's older brother, permanently joined the band on guitar after the end of Darlin', a short-lived band that Brancowitz had formed with Thomas Bangalter and Guy-Manuel de Homem-Christo, who would later form electronic duo Daft Punk. Two years later the band took on the name Phoenix and pressed 500 copies of a single on their own label, Ghettoblaster. Shortly after, they were signed to the Paris-based Source Records. Phoenix quickly became well acquainted with labelmates Air when they acted as their backing band on several UK TV appearances.

=== United, Alphabetical, and Live! Thirty Days Ago (2000–2004) ===
Phoenix began releasing singles in 1999, the first of these being "Heatwave" and "Party Time", the latter of which would eventually appear on their debut album, United. The single "Too Young" was released on 22 May 2000, along with remixes of the track by Zoot Woman and Le Knight Club. "Too Young" was the band's first single to chart, reaching No. 97 in France and No. 148 in the UK. The band's debut album, United, was released on 12 June 2000. It featured the singles "Party Time" and "Too Young", with "If I Ever Feel Better" being announced as the third single from the album on 22 January 2001, and charting in several countries, reaching No. 12 in France and No. 4 in Italy. United received positive reviews, although the band did not reach mainstream success. "Too Young" was included on the soundtrack for the movie Lost in Translation (which was directed by Mars' future wife, Sofia Coppola), as well as in the movie Shallow Hal.

Shortly after the release of United, Phoenix began work on a second album, recording in 2003 and 2004 and releasing the singles "Run Run Run" and "Everything Is Everything" in 2004. The band's second album, Alphabetical, was released on 22 March 2004 and saw the band reach more mainstream success, with both singles reaching some alternative rock airplay charts. French fashion designer Hedi Slimane commissioned a special mix of their song "Victim of the Crime", taken from Alphabetical, as the soundtrack to one of his runway shows for Dior Homme.

Following Alphabetical, the band toured three continents, playing 150 dates. This tour was followed up with a live album, Live! Thirty Days Ago, released only thirty days after the end of the tour.

=== It's Never Been Like That and Kitsuné Tabloid (2005–2009) ===
After their Alphabetical tour, Phoenix spent time in Berlin during the summer of 2005, making use of Planet Roc Studio to produce their third album. On 8 May 2006, the band released the lead single from the album, titled "Long Distance Call". American band Paramore would go on to perform a cover of the song live on Taratata, a French TV show. Phoenix's third studio album, titled It's Never Been Like That, was released on 15 May 2006. It was the first to feature Thomas Hedlund on drums.

To promote the release of the album, Phoenix toured the United States and Europe in 2006. The album charted in several countries, reaching even greater success than Alphabetical, although it still did not chart in much of North America. It's Never Been Like That was re-released in Mexico later that year, with the so-called "tour edition" featuring four bonus tracks recorded live in Oslo from the tour. On 11 September 2006, the track "Consolation Prizes" was announced to be the second single from It's Never Been Like That.

Phoenix curated a compilation album for French electronic music record and fashion label Kitsuné. It was released on 23 March 2009, and includes music by Elvis Costello, Roxy Music, Kiss, Lou Reed and others.

=== Wolfgang Amadeus Phoenix (2009–2011) ===
In early 2009, around the time of the release of the Phoenix's compilation album for Kitsuné, it was announced that the band would be returning with a new album titled Wolfgang Amadeus Phoenix, which would be released on 25 May 2009. The album was recorded in Paris, and was co-produced and mixed by Philippe Zdar of Cassius. "1901", a tribute to early Paris, was released on 23 February 2009 on the band's website as a free download. Due to extremely positive reviews, the song was then issued as a retail single and aired for the first time on Australian radio station Triple J. In June 2009, after the release of the album, Phoenix first appeared on the cover of the 62nd issue of The FADER publication. As the album's popularity rapidly grew, "Lisztomania" and "Lasso" were issued as the second and third singles from Wolfgang Amadeus Phoenix.

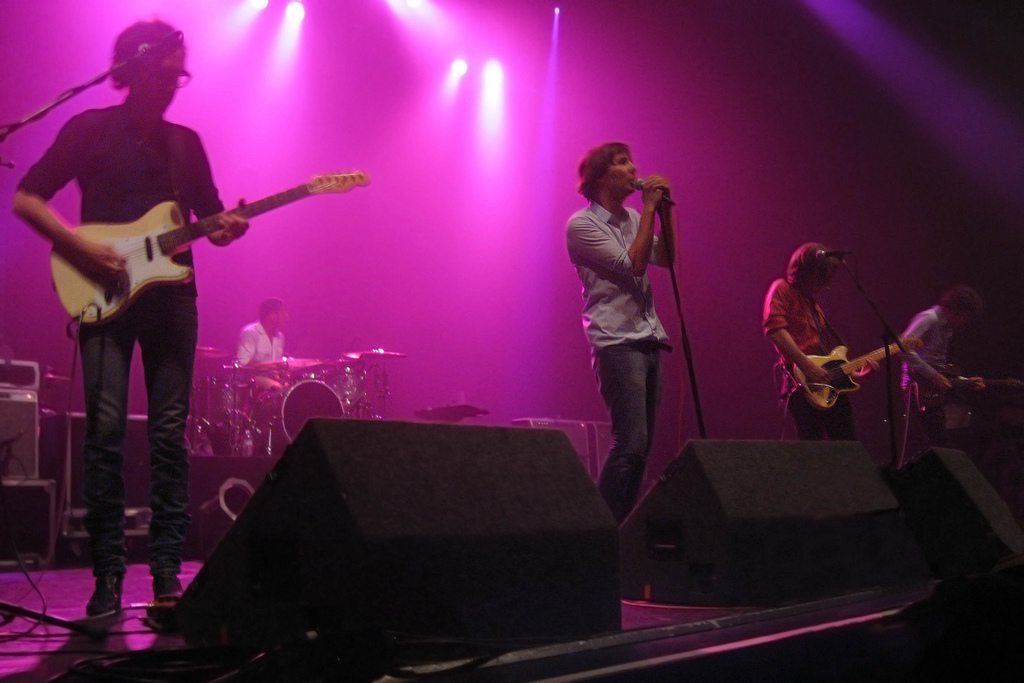
Phoenix performing at The Wiltern in Los Angeles, 2009.

As it became apparent that "1901" was Phoenix's biggest success yet, the song was performed live on several TV shows and began to appear everywhere. "1901" was featured in the US during Super Bowl XLV in a Green Bay Packers montage, and was also performed on Saturday Night Live along with "Too Young" and "Lisztomania" on 4 April. Phoenix also performed "Lisztomania" on Late Night with Jimmy Fallon, "Girlfriend" on The Late Late Show with Craig Ferguson, and "1901" on the Late Show with David Letterman, Jimmy Kimmel Live! and The Tonight Show with Conan O'Brien.

Wolfgang Amadeus Phoenix won Best Alternative Music Album at the 2009 Grammy Awards on 31 January 2010. Shortly afterwards, "1901" hit No. 1 on the Billboard Alternative Songs chart. The album was the first Phoenix album to be certified gold and appeared on numerous "Best of" lists at the end of 2010, including Rolling Stone magazine. In addition, "1901" and "Lisztomania" were certified platinum and gold, respectively.

Following the album's release, Phoenix appeared at various major music festivals, including the Austin City Limits Music Festival in Texas in 2009, Coachella Music Festival in Indio, California in 2010, the 2010 Bonnaroo Music Festival in Manchester, Tennessee, the Southside Festival and Hurricane Festival in Germany, the 2010 Lollapalooza, the Mile High Music Festival, Outside Lands Music and Arts Festival in San Francisco, California, Rock Werchter 2010 in Belgium, and the 2010 Reading and Leeds Festivals. On 20 October 2010, French electronic music group Daft Punk, composing of guitarist Christian Mazzalai's childhood friends Thomas Bangalter and Guy-Manuel de Homem-Christo, made a special appearance for their show in Madison Square Garden.

AllMusic, a review website, commented favourably on the release of the album. "Beyond containing the band's best, most efficient songwriting, the album also stands apart from the first three studio albums by projecting a cool punch that is unforced," a reviewer commented. Vocalist Thomas Mars, described as "more bright-eyed and youthful than ever", is more prominent in these songs, harmonising with the instruments. "Maybe they've just hit their stride," the reviewer said.

Phoenix are the subject of a documentary From a Mess to the Masses that documents their 2009–10 tour in support of Wolfgang Amadeus Phoenix. The film was directed by Antoine Wagner and Francisco Soriano—Wagner was also responsible for directing the "Lisztomania" music video. The title of the documentary is a lyrical excerpt from "Lisztomania" and the total running time is 52 minutes. From a Mess to the Masses premiered in Germany and France on the Arte television network on 13 October 2011.

=== Bankrupt! (2011–2015) ===
On 5 April 2011, the band posted a blog update on their website entitled "Songwriting..." with CCTV stills of the band working in a studio. The band said that the album would be a departure from the pop sounds of Wolfgang Amadeus Phoenix, and they were trying to create something more experimental. The same year, vocalist Thomas Mars married American screenwriter and director Sofia Coppola, whom he had met while producing the soundtrack to The Virgin Suicides in 1999.

On 16 January 2012, the band had completed four songs for the fifth album and it was scheduled for a late summer 2012 release, with an autumn tour. Daniel Glass, the founder of Glassnote Records, stated in relation to the material, "It's very hard to beat Wolfgang Amadeus Phoenix, but this could be revolutionary." The webpage was updated to display the words Pluviôse, Thermidor and Vendémiaire. Pluviôse, Thermidor and Vendémiaire are three of the months of the French Republican Calendar (also known as the Revolutionary Calendar).

On 16 January 2013 Bankrupt! was announced as the title of the fifth album. The cover depicts a color drawing of a peach next to a peach slice, with a pink flower and two green leaves; the track listing included song titles such as the title track, "S.O.S. in Bel Air", "Bourgeois", and "Oblique City".

A schedule of the music festivals that Phoenix performed at in support of the new album was announced and headline positions were confirmed for Germany's Rock am Ring and Rock im Park Festivals, Coachella Valley Music and Arts Festival, Primavera Sound, and Lollapalooza. The band also appeared at the Beale Street Music Festival in Memphis, Tennessee, and appeared alongside acts such as Beyoncé and Nine Inch Nails at the "Made in America" festival during Labor Day weekend in Philadelphia, Pennsylvania.

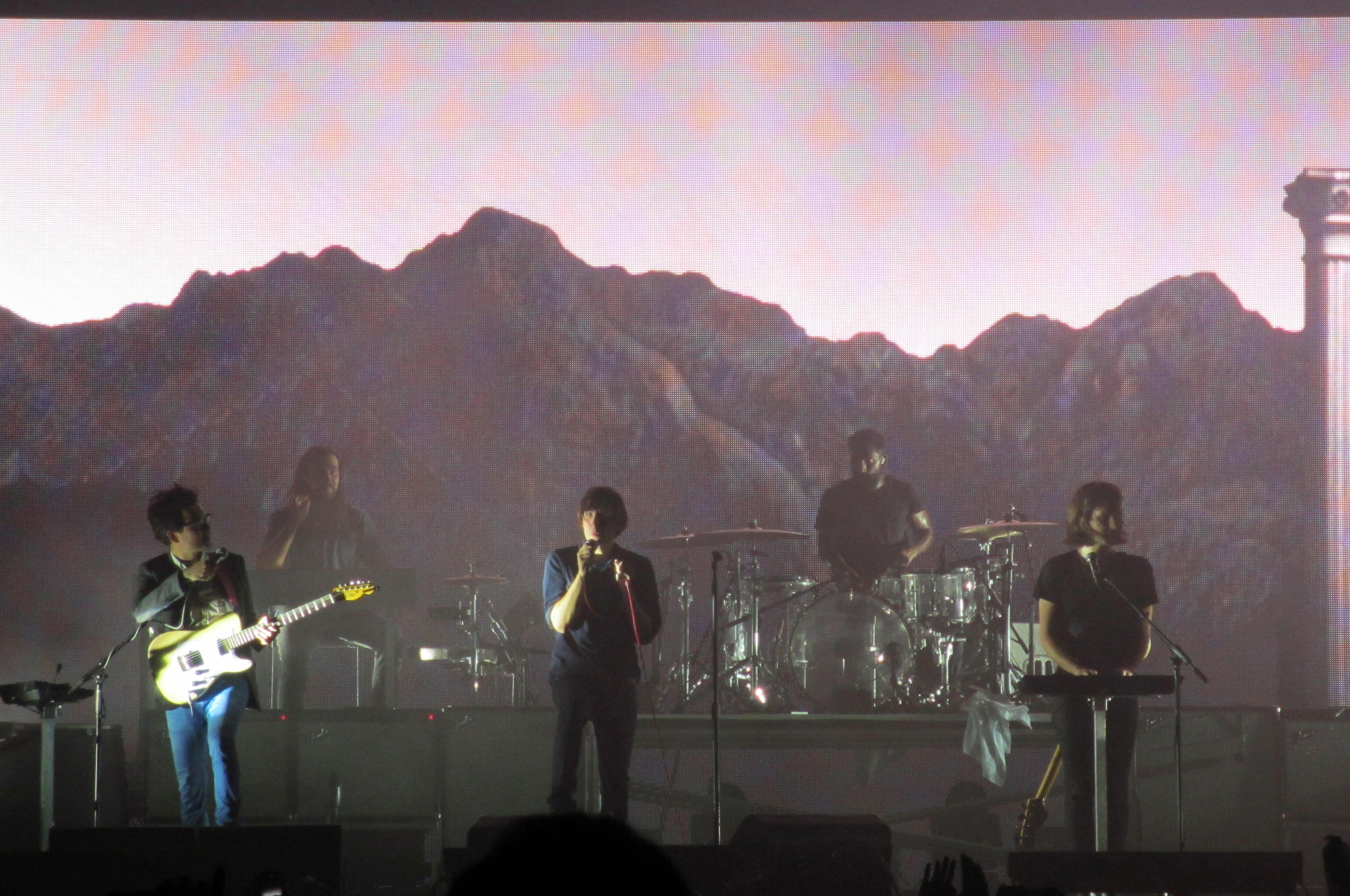
Phoenix performing at the Aragon Ballroom in Chicago, 2013.

On 18 February 2013, the band released "Entertainment", the first single from the album. A music video for the song, directed by Patrick Daughters, was released on 7 March 2013. On 28 March, Phoenix started their 2013 tour in Vancouver, British Columbia, at the Queen Elizabeth Theatre and performed their first concert in two years—the show's set list included "Sunskrupt!", a song that combines "Bankrupt!" and "Love Like a Sunset". Phoenix performed on American television during the next month—on 6 April, Phoenix was the musical guest on Saturday Night Live and performed "Entertainment" and "Trying to Be Cool/Drakkar Noir"; on 18 April 2013, the band repeated the two-song set list on Jimmy Kimmel Live!.

On 22 April 2013, Phoenix played a London show at Shepherd's Bush Empire on the day that Bankrupt! was released. In a review of the performance, music writer Josh Holliday declared: "And along with peace, love and understanding, what the world needs now is a band we can all believe in as one. That band is Phoenix." On 6 May 2013, Phoenix were taped for the thirty-ninth season of live music television series Austin City Limits (ACL) at Moody Theatre in Austin, Texas. Terry Likona, executive producer of the show, announced that Phoenix would co-headline the two-weekend Austin City Limits Music Festival in October 2013, alongside other big acts such as Kings of Leon, Wilco, and Depeche Mode.

In media articles on Bankrupt! after the album's release, Mars provided insight into the circumstances that influenced the creation of the band's fifth album: "At that time, we started talking about success and not music. I guess it was time to protect ourselves and focus on music again." Mars made reference to the period of intensive public attention that occurred in the wake of the Grammy Award-winning Wolfgang Amadeus Phoenix, Phoenix's first record to achieve gold certification.

Mars also reflected on the benefits of the band's belated success: "We're lucky that we didn't have a hit single for a while, so when we play live, people are not expecting just one song, and we don't tour as a greatest hits band, which can be sad, I'm sure." In a more general sense, Mars also emphasized the importance of the live setting for Phoenix and its relationship to studio work: "I guess we're perfectionists in the way that when we make an album, we know it's going to last. It's important that it's exactly how we want it to be. But when the record is done, it's all about imperfection. It's all about playing live."

Phoenix also used the Harrison 4032 solid-state recording console, the same console used on Michael Jackson's Thriller, to mix Bankrupt!. The console was purchased on eBay and shipped to Paris. Bankrupt! debuted at number 4 on the American Billboard 200 albums chart and a Phoenix world tour was completed over a large part of 2013.

Phoenix appeared in the 2015 Netflix special A Very Murray Christmas, directed by Mars' wife Sofia Coppola. The group performed a cover of The Beach Boys' "Alone on Christmas Day", with Bill Murray providing backing vocals.

=== Ti Amo (2016–2019) ===
In November 2016, Phoenix changed their social media themes to a television holding screen image. They also announced a series of festival appearances in Spain and France. On 4 January 2017, it was announced that they would be in a headlining spot at Governors Ball in New York City the first weekend of June, which would be their first show since 2014. In March they announced two warm-up shows on 22 and 23 April in Antwerp, Belgium.

On 1 March 2017, Phoenix again updated social media, teasing new music with a 30-second clip, and announcing multiple tour dates. By 24 April 2017, the band had announced that their sixth album, Ti Amo, would be released on 9 June 2017. Three days later, on 27 April 2017, the band released the album's first single, "J-Boy" (an acronym for "Just Because of You"). This was followed by the release of the title track, "Ti Amo", on 18 May 2017 and the single "Goodbye Soleil" on 2 June 2017, a week before the album's release. Phoenix toured worldwide to promote the release of Ti Amo.

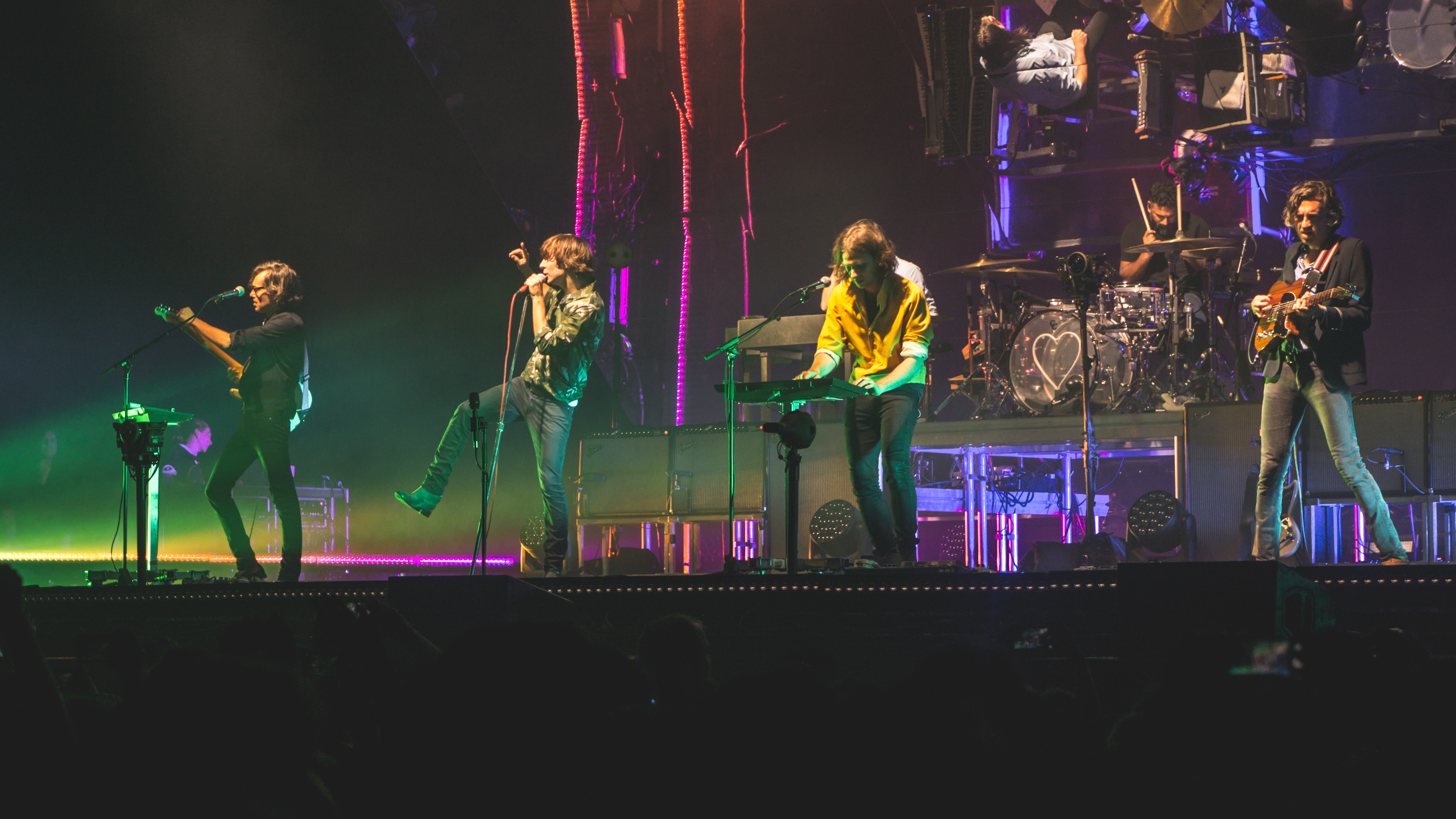
Phoenix performing at the Alexandra Palace in London, 2017.

The band performed residency shows in Paris, New York City, Los Angeles, Tokyo, and Mexico City titled, "A Very Speciale Night with Phoenix". It featured exclusive merchandise, Phoenix vending machine, gelato (food selection varied at shows), discoteca after party, live music, special guests, and Phoenix sake.

In 2017, Phoenix collaborated with Tatenokawa, Inc., a brewery from Yamagata Prefecture, Japan, as a tribute for their late friend Toshiro Kuroda, a Japanese restaurateur who ran a store in Paris called Workshop Isse which offered food and sake from Japan. This store was on the ground floor of Christian Mazzalai's apartment building, which is how he became friends with Kuroda. During the band's Japan tour while promoting Bankrupt!, Kuroda took the band to visit sake breweries in Japan, one of which was Tatenokawa, Inc.

Phoenix and Tatenokawa, Inc. created Phoenix Sake Collection, which features Tatenokawa Phoenix (also referred to as Rainbow Label) and Sparkling sake. The Sparking sake was created to commemorate the band's 20th anniversary. The collection also featured limited-edition brews: Tatenokawa Junmai Daiginjo, Kaze no Mori Junmai Daiginjo (from Nara Prefecture), and Sohomare Junmai Ginjo (from Tochigi Prefecture). The bottles were wrapped in a hand-dyed washcloth featuring illustrations of the band and sake logo. A portion of the sales were donated to the Japanese Red Cross.

In 2019, Phoenix released the biography Liberté, Egalité, Phoenix!, written by Laura Snapes.

=== Alpha Zulu and Olympics performance (2020–present) ===
On 19 August 2020, the band released "Identical" for Sofia Coppola's film On the Rocks. It topped the Billboard Adult Alternative Airplay chart in November 2020.

Phoenix began recording their seventh album Alpha Zulu during the COVID-19 pandemic in 2020 at the Musée des Arts décoratifs, a studio located within the Louvre Palace in Paris. Brancowitz said the band "felt it would be a fantastic adventure to create something out of nothing", with Mazzalai revealing that they wrote "almost all" of Alpha Zulu within the first 10 days. The album was inspired by Philippe Zdar of the band Cassius, who produced three of Phoenix's albums and died in 2019.

On 27 May 2022, the band announced the lead single "Alpha Zulu", which was released on 1 June. "Alpha Zulu" topped the US Adult Alternative Airplay chart in August for two weeks. The band began the Alpha Zulu tour on 6 September in St. Paul, Minnesota. The next day, Phoenix released "Tonight" featuring Vampire Weekend's Ezra Koenig. It was the band’s first song with a guest vocalist. It would also top the US Adult Alternative Airplay chart, this time for seven weeks. The album Alpha Zulu was released on 4 November 2022. On 16 March 2023, Phoenix released a remix of "After Midnight" that featured American singer-songwriter Clairo.

Phoenix toured with Beck on the Summer Odyssey tour throughout August and September 2023, featuring stops such as the Kia Forum in Los Angeles, the Red Rocks Amphitheatre in Colorado and Madison Square Garden in New York City.

On 17 November 2023, Phoenix released a remix of "Artefact" that featured Mexican singer León Larregui.

On August 11, 2024, during the 2024 Summer Olympics closing ceremony in Paris at Stade De France, after a "whimsical creation of the Olympic rings," the band performed "Lisztomania" and alongside Kavinsky and Angèle who performed “Nightcall”. The band also played "If I Ever Feel Better", "Funky Squaredance" (joined by Vannda), "Playground Love" (joined by Air), "Tonight" (joined by Ezra Koenig), and "1901".

Phoenix formed the supergroup UFOs with Braxe + Falcon, which released their debut single "UFO" on 23 September. It was released via Domino Records and Smugglers Way, with a limited edition 12" vinyl released at select independent record stores. Stereogum commented on the debut of the group that if this were just a one-off affair akin to Stardust with "Music Sounds Better with You", they felt "UFO" was a great song, feeling Mars's singing and the "percolating haze of keyboards" were lovely. Les Inrockuptibles wrote the supergroup's debut single mixed the dance style of Braxe + Falcon with the pop of Phoenix, creating a "definitive masterstroke". Warren Fu directed the music video, which features alien spaceships and vintage photos, including images of the members of Braxe + Falcon and Phoenix as children.

== Members ==
- Thomas Mars – lead vocals, drums, percussion
- Deck d'Arcy – bass, keyboards, backing vocals
- Laurent Brancowitz – lead & rhythm guitar, keyboards, backing vocals
- Christian Mazzalai – rhythm & lead guitar, backing vocals
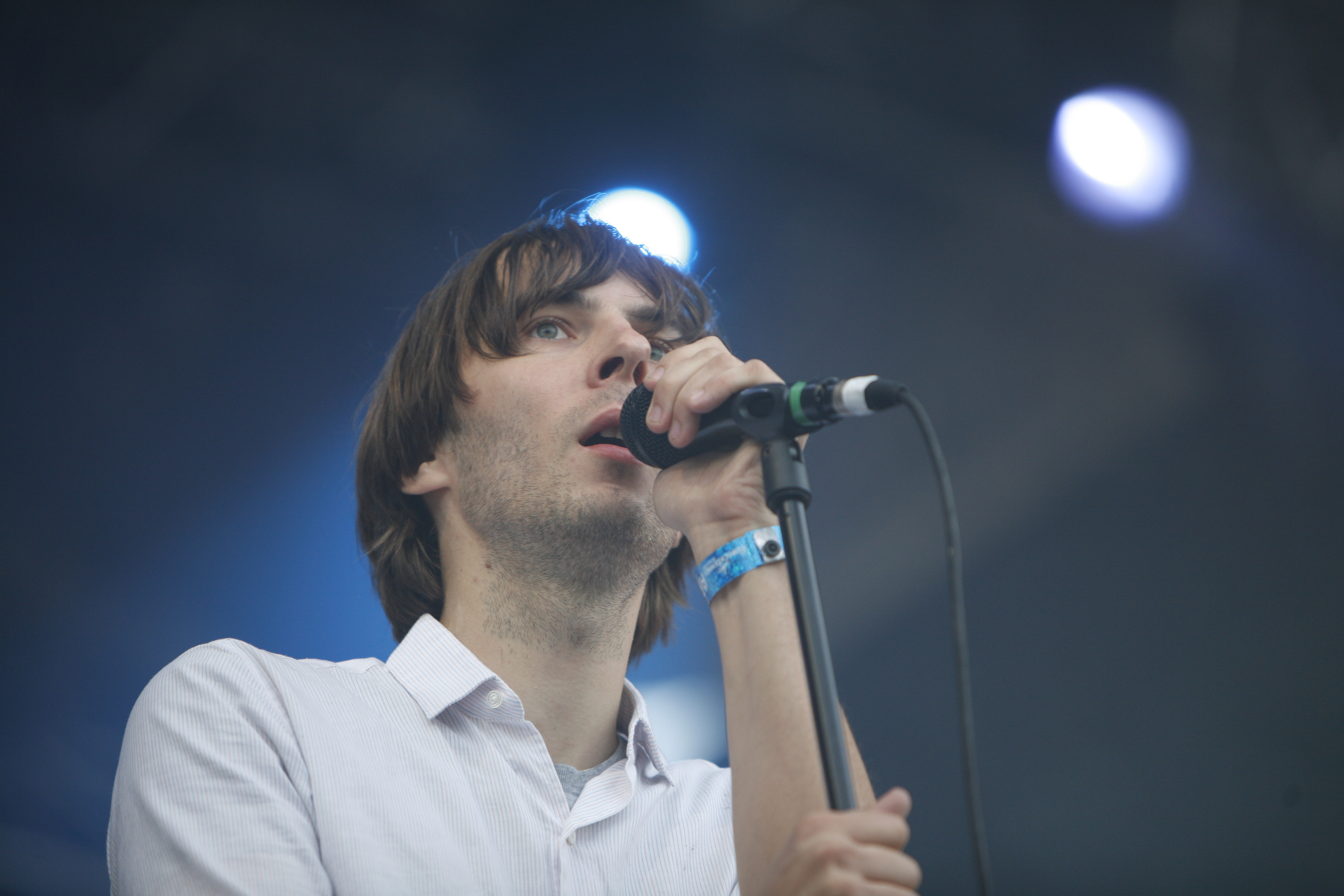
Thomas Mars
Vocals

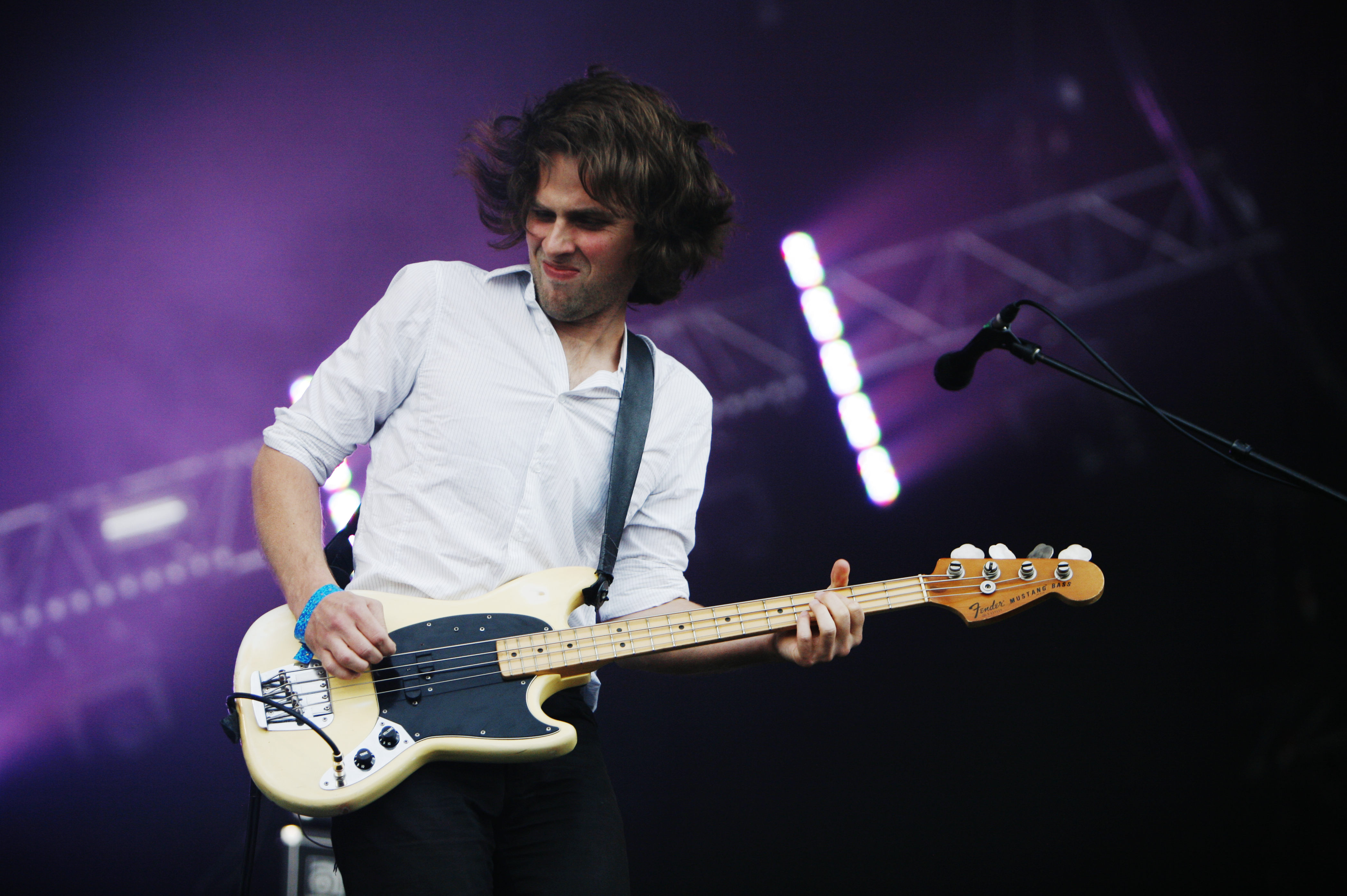
Deck d'Arcy
Bass, keyboards

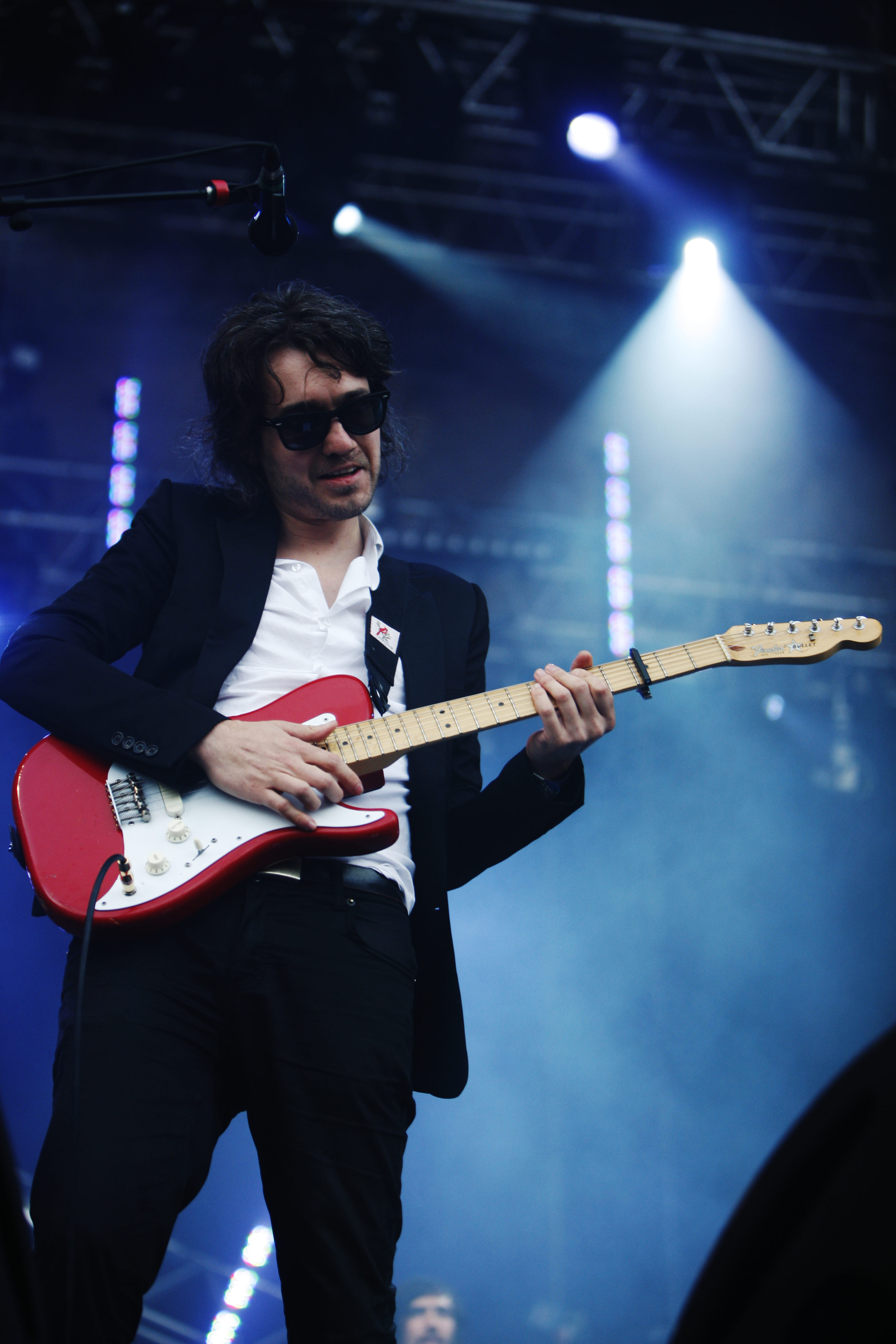
Laurent Brancowitz
Guitar, keyboards

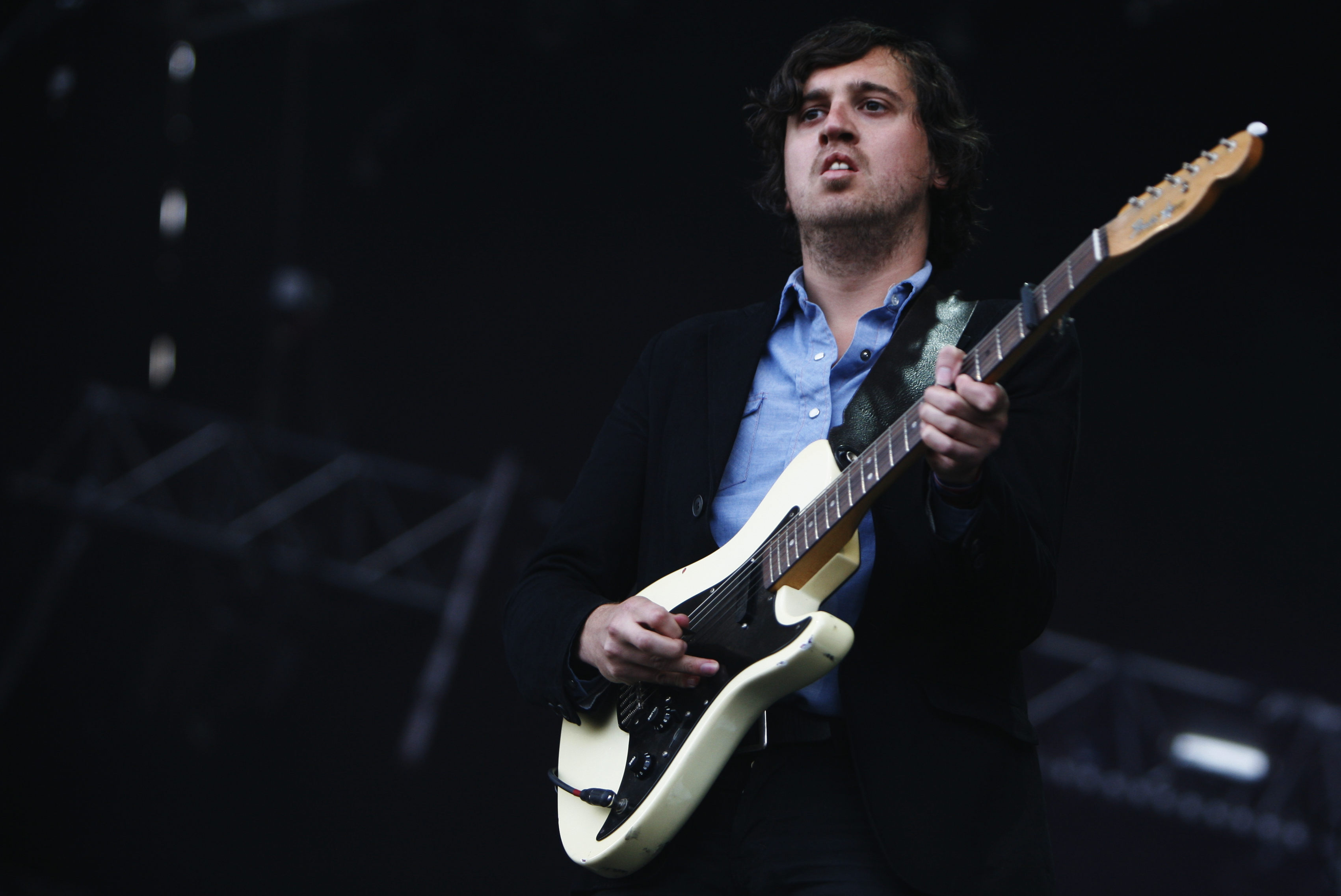
Christian Mazzalai
Guitar

Touring musicians

- Robin Coudert – keyboards, percussion
- Thomas Hedlund – drums, percussion (session studio drummer since 2005)

== Discography ==
- United (2000)
- Alphabetical (2004)
- It's Never Been Like That (2006)
- Wolfgang Amadeus Phoenix (2009)
- Bankrupt! (2013)
- Ti Amo (2017)
- Alpha Zulu (2022)

== Awards and nominations ==
Phoenix has won:

- The 2010 Grammy Award for Best Alternative Music Album for Wolfgang Amadeus Phoenix
- The 2014 Victoires de la Musique Rock Album of the Year for Bankrupt!

== See also ==
- List of French Grammy Award winners and nominees
