= Youth Without Youth =

Youth Without Youth can refer to:

- Youth Without Youth (novella), a 1976 novella by Romanian writer Mircea Eliade
- Youth Without Youth (film), a 2007 film by Francis Ford Coppola based on the novella
- "Youth Without Youth" (song), a 2012 single by Canadian indie band Metric
