= Isabelle Kusman =

American actress

Isabelle Kusman (born December 29, 2003) is an American actress.

Kusman grew up dancing in St. Louis prior to seeking out an acting career. She became interested in acting after performing in a production of Annie in high school.

In 2021, Kusman would be cast in Paul Thomas Anderson's Licorice Pizza, as well as in Steven Spielberg's The Fabelmans. In 2022, she would be cast in Francis Ford Coppola's Megalopolis. She appears in the Netflix series His & Hers.

== Filmography ==
=== Film ===
Year	Title	Role	Notes
2021	Licorice Pizza	Sue Pomerantz	
2022	The Fabelmans	Claudia Denning	
2024	Megalopolis	Claudine Pulcher	
2026	Heartland	Young Misty	

=== Television ===
Year	Title	Role	Notes
2026	His & Hers	Teen Rachel	Miniseries, 6 episodes
