= Youth Without Youth (film) =

2007 film by Francis Ford Coppola

- Theatrical release poster
- Directed by: Francis Ford Coppola
- Screenplay by: Francis Ford Coppola
- Based on: Youth Without Youth by Mircea Eliade
- Produced by: Francis Ford Coppola
- Starring: Tim Roth; Bruno Ganz; Alexandra Maria Lara; André Hennicke; Marcel Iureș; Adrian Pintea
- Cinematography: Mihai Mălaimare Jr.
- Edited by: Walter Murch
- Music by: Osvaldo Golijov
- Production company: American Zoetrope
- Distributed by: Sony Pictures Classics (United States); MediaPro Entertainment (Romania); Pathé Distribution (France); BiM Distribuzione (Italy); Sony Pictures Releasing (Germany)
- Release dates: October 20, 2007 (Rome Film Festival); October 26, 2007 (Italy); November 14, 2007 (France); December 14, 2007 (US); July 10, 2008 (Germany)
- Running time: 124 minutes
- Countries: United States; Romania; France; Italy; Germany
- Languages: English; Sanskrit; German; French; Italian; Russian; Romanian; Mandarin; Latin; Armenian; Egyptian
- Budget: $1 million
- Box office: $2.6 million

Youth Without Youth is a 2007 fantasy drama film written, directed, and produced by Francis Ford Coppola, based on the novella of the same name by Romanian author Mircea Eliade. The film is a co-production between the United States, Romania, France, Italy and Germany. It was the first film that Coppola had directed in ten years, since 1997's The Rainmaker.

The film opens in 1938, with an elderly Romanian professor contemplating suicide. He is struck by lightning, and consequently finds himself rejuvenated. He subsequently develops psychic powers, which attract the attention of Nazi agents. He flees to Switzerland, where he meets a reincarnation of his past lover. He discovers information both about her various past incarnations, and about the evolutionary potential of humanity.

The film premiered at the 2007 Rome Film Festival. It was distributed through Sony Pictures Classics in the United States (where it was released on December 14, 2007) and by Pathé Distribution in France. The music was composed by Argentinian classical composer Osvaldo Golijov. In an interview, Coppola said that he made the film as a meditation on time and on consciousness, which he considers a "changing tapestry of illusion", but he stated that the film may also be appreciated as a beautiful love story, or as a mystery.

== Plot ==
In 1938, Dominic Matei, a 70-year-old professor of linguistics in Piatra Neamț, travels to Bucharest, where he met the love of his youth, Laura. Feeling that his fruitless search for the origin of human language has condemned him to a solitary, wasted life, Dominic wants to commit suicide. In Bucharest, he is struck by lightning. Dominic subsequently regenerates into a younger man and gains psychic capacities.

As Romania is invaded by Nazi Germany, Doktor Josef Rudolf begins to show an interest in Dominic, who is residing at the home of Professor Stanciulescu and has developed a talent for speaking in tongues. Since Dominic's budding powers blurred his perception of reality, he is bamboozled into mistaking a Nazi spy for an erotic fantasy. They spend their nights together. Meanwhile, invisible to human eyes, an alternate persona presents itself to Dominic as his "Other" from outside space and time. When Dominic asks for proof, the "Other" brings him two roses out of nowhere. Stanciulescu secretly witnesses the event and overhears Dominic ask, "Where do you want me to put the third rose?" Stanciulescu persuades Dominic to escape from Romania and the Nazis.

Living like a spy, Dominic winds up in Switzerland towards the end of World War II. There, he is confronted by Rudolf at gunpoint in an alleyway. Rudolf argues that Dominic's existence supports the Nazis' ideal of the superman, and that the coming nuclear conflicts can only be survived by a superior species of man. The "Other" confirms this to be the case. In refusing to cooperate, Dominic manifests telekinetic powers which manipulate Rudolf into shooting himself. Dominic returns to a normal existence and resumes his linguistic research. Having realised that the lightning strike partially lent him the capacities and knowledge of future humanity, he develops a secret language for his audio diary, to be deciphered long after the nuclear apocalypse.

Years later, Dominic encounters a woman named Veronica while hiking in the Alps. The "Other" reveals her to be the reincarnation of Laura. When the mountains are hit by a thunderstorm, Dominic rushes to her rescue and finds Veronica chanting in Sanskrit. He greets Veronica in Sanskrit to gain her trust. During her stay in hospital, Veronica now identifies herself as "Rupini", one of the first disciples of the Buddha. Rupini's last act in life was to retire into a cave for meditation on enlightenment. Suspecting that Veronica may now be afflicted with a condition similar to his own, Dominic calls the Roman College of Oriental Studies for aid. Since the location of Rupini's cave is unknown, the scholars, led by Professor Giuseppe Tucci, agree to fund an expedition to find it in India. They hope that Veronica's past self will guide them. A Bodhisattva eventually recognises "Rupini" and directs her to the place of meditation. Following this discovery, Veronica becomes herself again and falls for Dominic.

The couple elope to Malta, where Dominic eventually tells Veronica in her sleep that he has always loved her. This causes Veronica to travel further back along the path of her past selves. She begins chanting in the ancient Egyptian language, which Dominic does not understand. For the next two weeks, he learns how to control this state in Veronica. Dominic leads her to regress ever further in time and to speak previously unknown tongues. However, Veronica's health begins to decline from exhaustion. Dominic declares that he cannot continue these sessions, or even remain close to Veronica, as his proximity to her is accelerating her age. Over the objections of both Veronica and the "Other", he leaves.

Despairing, Dominic returns to Piatra Neamț. The "Other" appears to him in a mirror and reveals the future of mankind. Nuclear warfare will unleash an electromagnetic pulse, giving birth to a new and powerful human species. Dominic is this species' first member. Veronica symbolised the dawn of man, and he stood for the dusk. Outraged at the idea of sacrificing millions of lives in the name of evolution, Dominic shatters the mirror. The "Other" subsequently vanishes, yelling in an unfamiliar language. In the morning, townsfolk find Dominic's body, lying dead at the bottom of a staircase. The third rose appears in Dominic's lifeless grasp.

== Cast ==
- Tim Roth as Dominic Matei
- Alexandra Maria Lara as Laura, Veronica
- Bruno Ganz as Professor Stanciulescu
- André Hennicke as Josef Rudolf
- Marcel Iureș as Professor Giuseppe Tucci
- Adrian Pintea as Pandit
- Matt Damon as Ted Jones, a reporter for Life magazine
- Alexandra Pirici as the woman in Room 6

== Production ==
Francis Ford Coppola came across Mircea Eliade's original Youth Without Youth novella (1976) while doing research for his long-gestating passion project Megalopolis (2024). While debating on whether to finance Megalopolis with his own money from his winery and resort company, Coppola was given by his close friend Wendy Doniger, a University of Chicago professor, some books she deemed relevant for his dream project's themes, including Eliade's novella. Identifying with the novella's plot of a 70 year old man struggling to complete an ambitious project of his own, Coppola opted to temporarily shelve Megalopolis to "rest a bit" and self-finance a film adaptation of Youth Without Youth with the intent of making it "the opposite of Megalopolis and "feel empowered" with 1$ million cash he had available.

To do so, Coppola optioned the script on the sly, didn't inform his wife Eleanor and went to Romania for filming, financing the production with financial incentives from movies Coppola had made in Europe with some "scrappy" filmmaking. Coppola proceeded to set up a production office at the Bucharest pharmaceutical company of a friend of his, holding auditions for actors and cinematographers amid different stores. He went as far hiring a 28 year old cinematographer, who had just gotten out of film school, to shoot the film in less expensive high-definition digital video. With help of his friend George Lucas, Coppola equipped a Dodge Sprinter cargo van for all his camera gear, a technique he learned from his collaboration with Lucas in The Rain People (1969). Making Youth Without Youth made Coppola feel creatively fulfilled for the first time since Rumble Fish (1983): "You lose your confidence. People in the arts — they've got that, maybe, imbalance. Now I know I can make a movie without having to ask anyone's permission".

The film was shot on Sony HDW-F900 CineAlta cameras paired with the SRW1 HDSR recorder, a unique utilization at the time. As Malaimare was only experienced with shooting on film, Coppola sent him to Son'y facilities in Los Angeles for training. The film's soundtrack was composed by Osvaldo Golijov.

== Release ==
The film was released on October 26, 2007 in Italy. The original runtime was 210 minutes, then cut down to 170, then cut down to 140 minutes, Walter Murch then cut it down to the desired 124 minutes. It was released on Blu-ray and DVD on May 13, 2008.

== Reception ==
=== Box office ===
Youth Without Youth grossed $244,397 in North America and $2.4 million in other countries for a worldwide total of $2.6 million.

=== Critical response ===
As of December 2020, the film holds a 33% approval rating on the review aggregator Rotten Tomatoes, based on 107 reviews with an average rating of 4.80/10. The site's critical consensus reads: "Although visually appealing, Coppola's latest film mixes too many genres with a very confusing plot". On Metacritic, the film has a weighted average score of 43 out of 100, based on 29 critics, indicating "mixed or average reviews". The New York Times gave it high praise, writing: "In this film Mr. Coppola blurs dreams and everyday life and suggests that through visual and narrative experimentation he has begun the search for new ways of making meaning, new holy places for him and for us." Variety, however, was "disappointed" by the "mishmash plotting" and "stilted script". Rex Reed panned the film, writing: "You know a movie is doomed when the only star in it is Tim Roth. You know it's pretentious when the ads print the logo backward and upside down. Not one word of this bilge makes one lick of sense, and it is two hours and six minutes long. The only way to survive Youth Without Youth is dead drunk." Roger Ebert of the Chicago Sun-Times gave the film one-and-a-half out of four stars, stating that "[t]here is such a thing as a complex film that rewards additional viewing and study, but Youth Without Youth, I am afraid, is no more than it seems: a confusing slog through metaphysical murkiness."

In 2016, Scout Tafoya of RogerEbert.com included the film in his video series "The Unloved", where he highlights films which received mixed to negative reviews that he believes to have artistic value. He stated that Coppola "made a film he would have wanted to see, with energy borrowed from his heroes. But this film is all him, really. What other major American director would throw out studio money just to scamper around Europe re-living the years of his father's prime? ... I saw the human struggling to change the world through his work, and the ways in which he failed himself, and I felt for him."

In 2024, Francis Ford Coppola revealed during an interview with Rolling Stone that Youth Without Youth wasn't meant to be successful but a "test" for himself to teach him what really means making a movie, as he had "sort of retired" from being a professional director since The Rainmaker (1997) and instead be a student who could discover what making movies consisted by self-financing "very small, low-budget" films and even organizing unusual rehearsals during which he learned a lot about acting. This was in order for Coppola to prepare himself for the development of his longtime passion project Megalopolis (2024).

=== Accolades ===
The film was nominated for Best Cinematography at the 23rd Independent Spirit Awards.
