= Youth Without Youth (novella) =

1976 Romanian-language book by Mircea Eliade

- Author: Mircea Eliade
- Original title: Tinereţe fără tinereţe
- Translator: Mac Linscott Ricketts
- Published: 1976
- Pages: 137
- ISBN: 9780226204154
- OCLC: 318402987

Youth Without Youth (Romanian: Tinereţe fără tinereţe) is a 1976 novella by Romanian author Mircea Eliade. It follows the life of Dominic Matei, an elderly Romanian intellectual who experiences a cataclysmic event that allows him to live a new life with startling intellectual capacity. In 2007, it was adapted into a film by Francis Ford Coppola, also titled Youth Without Youth.
