= Zahia (given name) =

Zahia is a feminine given name of Arabic origin. Notable people with the name include:

== Given name ==
- Zahia Benarous (born 1958), Algerian journalist and politician
- Zahia Dahmani (born 1972), French athlete
- Zahia Dehar (born 1992), Algerian-French fashion designer
- Zahia Hamdane (born 1965), French politician
- Zahia Kaddoura (1920–2002), Lebanese academic and a human and women's rights advocate
- Zahia Marzouk (1906–1988), Egyptian social worker and feminist
- Zahia Mentouri (1947–2022), Algerian physician and government official
- Zahia Rahmani (born 1962), French-Algerian author, curator, and art historian
- Zahia Ziouani (born 1978), French conductor and musician

== See also ==
- Zahia
- Zaria (disambiguation)
- Zahia affair
- Rima Zahia
