= Harvard Graduate School of Education =

Education school of Harvard University in Cambridge, Massachusetts

Coordinates: 42.37542°N 71.12177°W

- Coat of arms
- Type: Private
- Established: 1920; 106 years ago
- Dean: Nonie K. Lesaux
- Students: 876
- Location: Cambridge, Massachusetts, United States
- Campus: Urban
- Website: www.gse.harvard.edu

The Harvard Graduate School of Education (HGSE) is the education school of Harvard University, a private Ivy League research university in Cambridge, Massachusetts. Founded in 1920, it was the first school to grant the EdD degree and the first Harvard school to award degrees to women. HGSE enrolls around 800 students between its master of education (Ed.M.) and three-year doctor of education leadership (Ed.L.D.) programs.

It is associated with the Harvard Education Publishing Group whose imprint is the Harvard Education Press and publishes the Harvard Educational Review.

== History ==
In 1892, Harvard president Charles W. Eliot served as the chair of the Committee of Ten, a working group of educators charged with understanding the current state of preparation for students attending secondary education in public schools, and making recommendations for the future.

In addition, he appointed Paul Henry Hanus to begin the formal study of education as a discipline at Harvard. As a result, in 1906, education became a formal division within the Faculty of Arts and Sciences at the university.

This school was formally established in 1920, and in the next year, HGSE became the first school to grant a doctor of education (Ed.D.) degree. The EdD provided rigorous research training that equipped graduates with the knowledge and skills to have a broad impact in the worlds of policy and practice. The faculty has grown ever since.

In 1949, the Laboratory of Human Development (now the Human Development and Education Program) was established to examine the psychological development of children in their families and communities. Two years later, the Masters of Arts in Teaching degree was offered by HGSE, followed by the Administrative Career Program.

The school is run by Dean Nonie K. Lesaux.

=== Project Zero ===
Nelson Goodman founded Project Zero in 1967 to explore a basic research project in artistic cognition and artistic education. This project developed into a bigger scope ever since included being directed by Howard Gardner. Numerous research findings are converted into practice through modules, from thinking routines to learning rubrics that can be freely accessed.

=== Usable Knowledge ===
Originally developed by faculty members Kurt Fischer and Joe Blatt, the aim of Usable Knowledge is to be a resource for educators who hope to put HGSE research learnings into practice.

== Academics ==
HGSE offers a master of education degree (EdM) with five programs and two doctoral degree programs, a doctor of philosophy in education (PhD) and a doctor of education leadership (EdLD). (The PhD program replaced the EdD program, which enrolled its final cohort of students in fall 2013.) In addition, in 2022, the school launched an online, two-year, part-time master's degree in education leadership.

=== Master's in Education ===
HGSE offers five full-time, one-year, on-campus master's programs:

- Education Leadership, Organizations, and Entrepreneurship
- Education Policy and Analysis
- Human Development and Education
- Learning Design, Innovation, and Technology
- Teaching and Teacher Leadership

Students in the master's degree programs can also declare optional concentrations and pursue teacher, principal, counseling, or superintendent licensure pathways.

=== Institute for Management and Leadership in Education ===
The college also has the Institute for Management and Leadership in Education (MLE), which provides in-depth instruction on issues related to education.

== Buildings ==
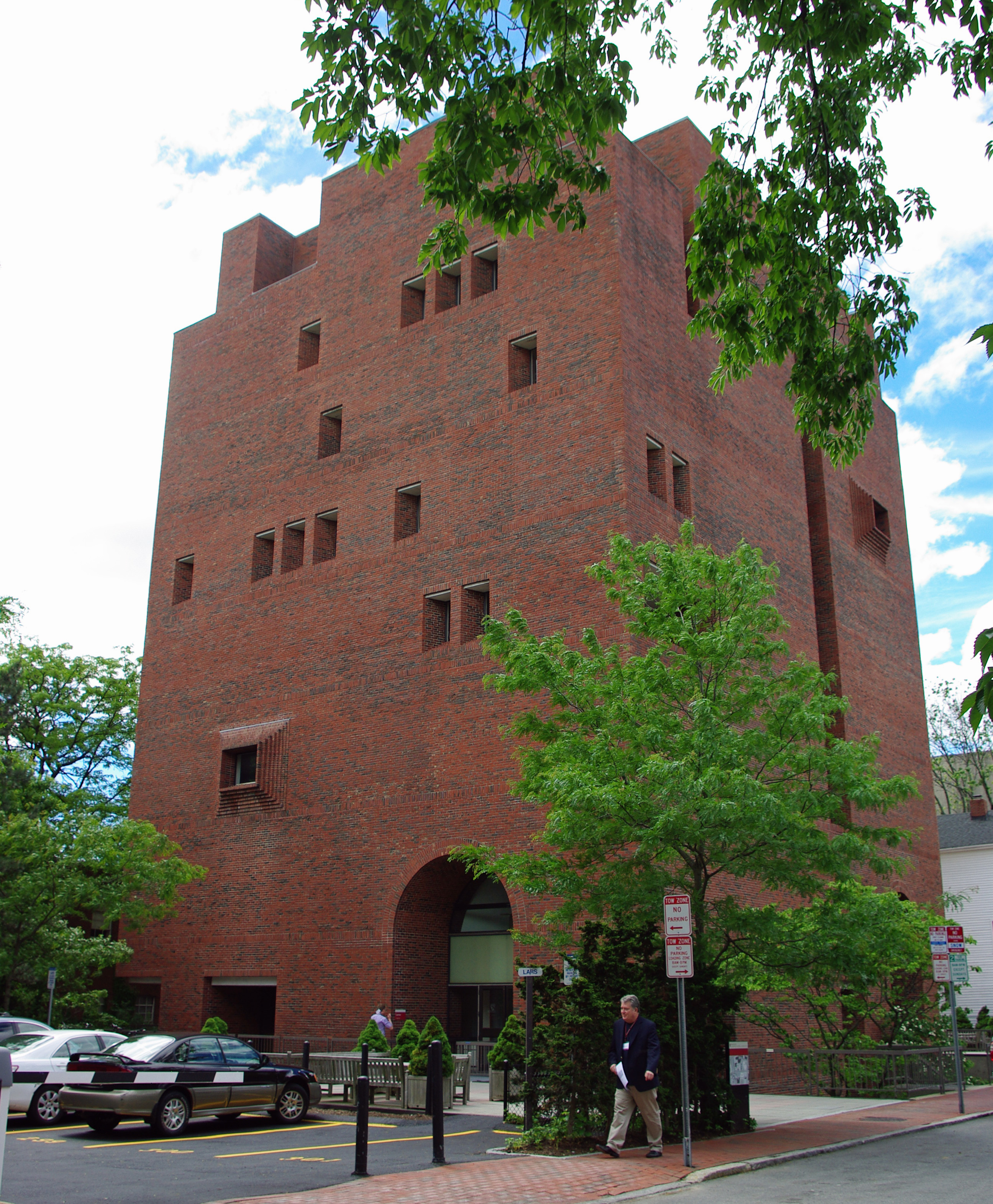
Larsen Hall

HGSE took possession of Longfellow Hall from Radcliffe College in 1962. The learning activities, along with the library and office were moved to Longfellow's basement. Larsen Hall was dedicated in 1963, completed in 1965, operating as the new classroom and research center of HGSE.

The Monroe C. Gutman Library is the school's primary library and one of its four main buildings.

== Notable people ==
=== Current faculty members ===
- Danielle Allen, joint appointment as Bryan Conant University Professor
- Elizabeth Bonawitz, Professor of Education
- David Deming (economist), joint appointment at HGSE
- Sarah Dryden-Peterson, Professor of Education
- Susan Dynarski, Patricia Albjerg Graham Professor of Education
- Catherine Elgin, Professor of Education
- Shawn Ginwright, Jerome T. Murphy Professor of the Practice
- Paul L. Harris, Victor S. Thomas Professor of Education
- Nancy E. Hill, Charles Bigelow Professor of Education
- Stephanie M. Jones, Gerald S. Lesser Professor in Early Childhood Development
- Thomas Kane (economist), Walter H. Gale Professor of Education and Economics
- Nonie K. Lesaux, Dean of the Faculty of Education (2025-), Roy Edward Larsen Professor of Education and Human Development
- Bridget Terry Long, Harvard University Distinguished Service Professor,

Saris Professor of Education and Economics, Dean of the Faculty of Education (2018-2024)

- Charles A. Nelson III, Professor of Education, joint appointment with Harvard Medical School
- Fernando Reimers, Ford Foundation Professor of the Practice
- Julie Reuben, Professor of Education
- Meredith L. Rowe, Saul Zaentz Professor of Early Learning and Development
- Jack Shonkoff, Julius B. Richmond FAMRI Professor of Child Health and Development, joint appointment with Harvard Medical School
- Richard Weissbourd, Senior Lecturer of Education
- Thomas Kane, Professor of Education

=== Past faculty members ===
- Christopher Dede, Senior Research Fellow, formerly Timothy E. Wirth Professor in Learning Technologies
- Howard Gardner, John H. and Elisabeth A. Hobbs Research Professor of Cognition and Education
- Carol Gilligan
- Patricia Graham, professor of education
- Robert Kegan William and Miriam Meehan Professor in Adult Learning and Professional Development
- Lawrence Kohlberg
- Sara Lawrence-Lightfoot, Emily Hargroves Fisher Professor of Education, renamed to the Sarah Lawrence-Lightfoot Professor of Education since her retirement
- Gerald S. Lesser, psychologist who played a major role in developing the educational programming included in Sesame Street.
- Kathleen McCartney, former dean; Gerald S. Lesser Professor in Early Childhood Education; current president of Smith College
- William G. Perry (psychologist)
- James E. Ryan, former dean; Charles William Eliot Professor of Education; former president of the University of Virginia
- Israel Scheffler
- Catherine Snow, John H. and Elisabeth A. Hobbs Research Professor of Cognition and Education
- Charles V. Willie, Charles William Eliot Professor of Education, Emeritus

=== Alumni ===
- Andrew McCollum, co-founder of Facebook; angel investor
- James McGreevey, former New Jersey state governor
- Martha Minow, dean, Harvard Law School
- Dianne Morales (born 1967), non-profit executive and political candidate
- Anne Sweeney, president, Disney-ABC Television Group
- Carl Gershman, president of the National Endowment for Democracy
- Deborah Bial, founder and president of the Posse Foundation
- Denise Juneau, superintendent of Seattle Public Schools; former Montana Superintendent of Public Instruction
- Elizabeth Dole, former United States Senator from North Carolina and wife of Bob Dole
- Geoffrey Canada, founder, Harlem Children's Zone
- Guadalupe Guerrero, superintendent of Portland Public Schools
- Jason Kamras, 2005 National Teacher of the Year and superintendent of Richmond Public Schools
- James Talarico, United States senator-elect from Texas
- Joanne V. Creighton, former president of Mount Holyoke College
- Jodi Picoult, American author
- Joseph Lekuton, Kenyan politician
- Lorna Hodgkinson, Australian educator; first woman to receive an Ed.D. from HGSE
- Michael Johnston, Colorado state senator, co-founder of New Leaders for New Schools
- Neal Baer, executive producer, Law and Order: SVU; former executive producer and writer, ER
- Nínive Clements Calegari, CEO of 826 National and founding executive director of 826 Valencia
- Robyn Ochs, bisexual and LGBT rights activist, speaker
- Marvin Ronning, education and environmental advocate; senior administrator at the Rhode Island Free Clinic
- Rhea Paul, speech and language disorder researcher
- Timothy Lannon, president of Creighton University
- Debbie Ricker, interim president of Hood College
- Theodore R. Sizer, dean, Harvard Graduate School of Education (1964-1972); headmaster, Phillips Andover Academy (1972-1981); founder of the Coalition of Essential Schools, Annenberg Institute for School Reform at Brown University, and Francis W. Parker Charter Essential School; author of numerous books on public education reform
- Clint Smith, writer and educator
- Sandra Sucher, business executive; professor, Harvard Business School
- William E. Trueheart, president of Bryant University, nonprofit CEO
- Joan Wexler, dean and president of Brooklyn Law School
- Peggy R. Williams, former president of Ithaca College
- Frank H. Wu, president of Queens College, City University of New York
- Zahia Marzouk, an Egyptian social worker and feminist who founded Egypt's first family planning association
- Ronald F. Levant, a psychologist and professor who co-founded the field of the psychology of men and masculinities
