= Stephanie M. Jones =

American developmental psychologist

- Education: Columbia University; Yale University
- Awards: Grawemeyer Award (2008)
- Scientific career
- Fields: Developmental psychologist
- Workplaces: Fordham University; Harvard University
- Doctoral advisor: Edward Zigler; Alice S. Carter

Stephanie M. Jones is an American developmental psychologist known for her research on social–emotional learning (SEL) and the effects of poverty and violence on child development. She is the Gerald S. Lesser Professor of Child Development and Education at the Harvard Graduate School of Education, where she directs the EASEL (Ecological Approaches to Social Emotional Learning) Lab. Jones's work focuses on evaluating and developing interventions for children in preschool and elementary school. Her research has been recognized with the 2008 Grawemeyer Award in Education.

== Education ==
Jones received a B.A. in psychology from Barnard College in 1992. She then attended Yale Graduate School of Arts and Sciences, where she earned a M.S. in 2000 and a Ph.D. in developmental psychology in 2002. Her doctoral training was with Edward Zigler and Alice S. Carter.

== Career ==
After receiving her bachelor's degree, Jones worked as a research assistant and later as a research coordinator at the Barnard College Center for Toddler Development from 1990 to 1994. From 1994 to 1998, she was a research associate for the Adolescent Pathways Project at New York University. She also worked at National Center for Children in Poverty, first as a staff associate and coordinator of developmental research and previously as a research associate.

Following her doctorate, Jones was a postdoctoral fellow at the Yale Child Study Center for the 2002 to 2003 academic year. During this time, she was also a Connecticut Child Health Policy Fellow. Jones began her faculty career as an assistant professor in applied developmental psychology at Fordham University, where she taught from 2004 to 2008.

In 2008, Jones joined the faculty of the Harvard Graduate School of Education (HGSE) as an assistant professor. That same year, she was a recipient of the Grawemeyer Award in Education for the book A Vision for Universal Preschool Education, co-authored with Edward Zigler and Walter Gilliam. She was promoted to associate professor in 2012, holding the title of Marie and Max Kargman Associate Professor in Human Development and Urban Education Advancement. In 2013, she received the Joseph E. Zins Early-Career Distinguished Contribution Award for Action Research in Social and Emotional Learning from the Collaborative for Academic, Social, and Emotional Learning (CASEL). Jones was promoted to full professor in 2017 and named the Gerald S. Lesser Professor of Child Development and Education.

=== Research ===
Jones's research is anchored in prevention science and examines the impact of poverty and exposure to violence on the social, emotional, and behavioral development of children and youth. Her work involves evaluating social–emotional learning (SEL) interventions in preschool and elementary schools and developing new curricula. She emphasizes conducting rigorous scientific research that produces accessible content for practitioners and policymakers.

At Harvard, Jones is the founding director of the EASEL (Ecological Approaches to Social Emotional Learning) Lab. Since 2016, she has also served as the faculty co-director, with Nonie K. Lesaux, of the Saul Zaentz Early Education Initiative at HGSE. This initiative received a $35.5 million gift in 2016 to address challenges in early childhood education. As part of the initiative, Jones and Lesaux lead the Early Learning Study at Harvard University, a large-scale study of three-year-olds in Massachusetts.

Jones has conducted evaluations of programs, including Reading, Writing, Respect and Resolution; Resolving Conflict Creatively; SECURE; and the Head Start CARES initiative. She contributed to the Making Caring Common project at Harvard University.

== Selected works ==
- Zigler, Edward; Gilliam, Walter S.; Jones, Stephanie M. (2006). A Vision for Universal Preschool Education. Cambridge University Press. ISBN 978-0-521-84854-1.
- Lesaux, Nonie K.; Jones, Stephanie M., eds. (2016). The Leading Edge of Early Childhood Education: Linking Science to Policy for a New Generation. Harvard Education Press. ISBN 978-1-61250-918-1.
- Lesaux, Nonie K.; Jones, Stephanie M.; Connors, Annie; Kane, Robin (2018). Early Education Leader's Guide. Guilford Publications. ISBN 978-1-4625-3752-5.
- Jones, Stephanie M.; Lesaux, Nonie K.; Barnes, Sophie P., eds. (2022). Measuring Noncognitive Skills in School Settings: Assessments of Executive Function and Social-Emotional Competencies. Guilford Publications. ISBN 978-1-4625-4867-5.
