= Alice Carter =

Alice Carter may refer to:

== People ==
- Alice Carter Cook (née Carter; 1865–1945), American botanist
- Alice Leslie Carter, American classic female blues singer of the 1920s
- Alice Carter (actress), cast in Exile (1990 film) and other films
- Alice S. Carter, American psychologist

== Fictional characters ==
- Alice Carter, a character from the Torchwood television series
- Alice Carter (The Archers), née Aldridge, character in UK radio soap The Archers
