= Nonie K. Lesaux =

Canadian-American psychologist and academic

- Education: Mount Allison University (BA); University of British Columbia (MA, PhD)
- Scientific career
- Fields: Developmental psychology, early childhood education
- Workplaces: Harvard University

Nonie K. Lesaux is a Canadian-American developmental psychologist, academic administrator, and expert in early childhood education and literacy. She is the dean of the Harvard Graduate School of Education, where she has been a faculty member since 2003. Lesaux's research focuses on improving learning opportunities and literacy outcomes for children from diverse linguistic, cultural, and economic backgrounds.

== Early life and education ==
Lesaux earned a B.A. with honors in psychology from Mount Allison University in 1999. She then attended the University of British Columbia, where she received a M.A. in 2001 and a Ph.D. in educational psychology and special education in 2003. Her doctoral thesis was a five-year longitudinal study on the development of reading in children from diverse linguistic backgrounds. Following her doctorate, she was a post-doctoral research fellow at the University of British Columbia and the British Columbia Children's Hospital Centre for Community Child Health Research.

== Career ==
Lesaux joined the faculty of the Harvard Graduate School of Education (HGSE) in 2003 as an assistant professor. She was promoted to associate professor in 2007 and became a full professor in 2012. Her work has been recognized with honors including the William T. Grant Scholars Award and the Presidential Early Career Award for Scientists and Engineers. In 2014, she was named the Juliana W. and William Foss Thompson Professor of Education and Society. In recognition of her contributions to educational research and policy, Lesaux was elected to the National Academy of Education in 2019.

From 2017 to 2021, Lesaux served as HGSE's academic dean, responsible for faculty and academic affairs. She was appointed interim dean of HGSE on July 1, 2024, succeeding Bridget Terry Long. In March 2025, she was named the permanent dean of the school. She also holds the title of Roy E. Larsen Professor of Education and Human Development.

=== Research and policy work ===
Lesaux's research focuses on the language and literacy skills of children from various backgrounds, often in urban settings. Her work often involves partnerships with school districts, states, and communities. She has led long-term research-practice partnerships with San Diego Unified School District and the New York City Department of Education.

With Stephanie M. Jones, Lesaux co-directs the Saul Zaentz Early Education Initiative at HGSE. The initiative, funded by a $35 million gift, aims to improve the quality of early education through research and leadership training. A key component is the Early Learning Study at Harvard, a large-scale study in Massachusetts examining the effects of early education settings on child development.

Lesaux has been actively involved in state and national education policy. From 2015 to 2022, she chaired the Massachusetts Board of Early Education and Care. She also served on the U.S. Department of Education's Reading First Advisory Committee and the Institute of Medicine and National Research Council's Committee on the Science of Children Birth to Age 8. Her 2010 state literacy report, Turning the Page: Refocusing Massachusetts for Reading Success, influenced the passage of a state third-grade reading proficiency bill. She currently serves as an expert consultant to the U.S. Department of Justice Civil Rights Division.

== Selected works ==
- Lesaux, Nonie K.; Marietta, Sky H. (2011). Making Assessment Matter: Using Test Results to Differentiate Reading Instruction. Guilford Press. ISBN 978-1-4625-0250-9.
- Lesaux, Nonie K.; Duke, Nell K.; Harris, Julie Russ (2015). Cultivating Knowledge, Building Language: Literacy Instruction for English Learners in Elementary School. Heinemann. ISBN 978-0-325-06250-1.
- Lesaux, Nonie K.; Galloway, Emily Phillips; Marietta, Sky H. (2016). Teaching Advanced Literacy Skills: A Guide for Leaders in Linguistically Diverse Schools. Guilford Publications. ISBN 978-1-4625-2647-5.
- Lesaux, Nonie K.; Jones, Stephanie M., eds. (2016). The Leading Edge of Early Childhood Education: Linking Science to Policy for a New Generation. Harvard Education Press. ISBN 978-1-61250-918-1.
- Lesaux, Nonie K.; Jones, Stephanie M.; Connors, Annie; Kane, Robin (2018). Early Education Leader's Guide. Guilford Publications. ISBN 978-1-4625-3752-5.
- Moje, Elizabeth Birr; Afflerbach, Peter P.; Enciso, Patricia; Lesaux, Nonie K., eds. (2020). Handbook of Reading Research, Volume V. Routledge. ISBN 978-1-317-38476-2.
- Jones, Stephanie M.; Lesaux, Nonie K.; Barnes, Sophie P., eds. (2022). Measuring Noncognitive Skills in School Settings: Assessments of Executive Function and Social-Emotional Competencies. Guilford Publications. ISBN 978-1-4625-4867-5.
