= Stephanie Jones =

Stephanie Jones may refer to:

- Stephanie J. Jones, American lawyer
- Stephanie M. Jones, American psychologist
- Stephanie Tubbs Jones (1949–2008), American politician
- Stephanie Jones (basketball) (born 1998), American professional basketball player
- Steffi Jones (born 1972), German football player and manager
