= Elizabeth Bonawitz =

Developmental psychologist

- Occupation: Professor of Education

Academic background
- Education: Northeastern University (B.S. in Cognitive Psychology); Massachusetts Institute of Technology (Ph.D. Brain and Cognitive Sciences)
- Alma mater: Massachusetts Institute of Technology

Academic work
- Discipline: Psychology
- Sub-discipline: Cognitive Development, Computational Modeling, Learning Sciences, Educational Psychology
- Institutions: Harvard Graduate School of Education

Elizabeth Bonawitz is a developmental psychologist and computational cognitive scientist. Her empirical research focuses on the core constructs of learning, children’s early causal beliefs, children’s curiosity, and how children develop perceptions of the world. Her work has been featured in The New York Times,The Economist,Psychology Today, and Scientific American.

Bonawitz is Professor of Education the Harvard Graduate School of Education. Prior to moving to Harvard in 2020, she was an Associate Professor at Rutgers University-Newark.

== Biography ==
In 2002, Bonawitz received her B.S. degree in cognitive psychology at Northeastern University. After obtaining her bachelor's degree, she obtained her Ph.D. in brain and cognitive sciences at Massachusetts Institute of Technology (MIT) in the year 2009. In 2002, Bonawitz worked as a lab coordinator at MIT, where she worked with Schulz and Josh Tenenbaum

In 2009, Bonawitz completed her Ph.D. under the supervision of Dr. Laura Schulz. Her Ph.D. dissertation used the Bayesian models to explain how children make rational predictions, explorations, and explanations. She argues that children are scientists and rational learners, who make predictions based on past experiences and information they learn.

In 2013, Bonawitz completed a postdoctoral fellowship at University of California, Berkeley, where she worked with Thomas Griffiths and Alison Gopnik. One of Bonawitz's projects investigating how children challenge their prior beliefs when presented with new evidence.

As an MIT graduate student, Bonawitz received the Angus Macdonald Award for Excellence in Undergraduate Teaching in 2006 and the Walle Nauta Award for Continuing Dedication to Teaching at MIT Department of Brain and Cognitive Sciences. In 2006, she also received The Marr Prize, which is sponsored by The Cognitive Science Society. In 2018, she received a six year grant from James S. McDonnell Foundation, worth $600,000, to do research on computational modelling on children's causal learning.

Bonawitz’s non scholarly interests include writing music, playing tennis, and skying. She used to sing for Dead Tongues, which is the un-official band of the Stanford Linguistics Department. Bonawitz has a YouTube channel, and she has a video of her singing "Empirical Girl," a satire take of Madonna's "Material Girl".

== Research ==
Bonawitz's research focuses on the core constructs of learning, children’s early causal beliefs, children’s curiosity, and how children develop perceptions of the world. Her studies explore how babies and infants explore cause and effect relationships through their exploration.

Bonawitz is a Jacobs Foundation Research Fellow. She does experiments in the lab to study how children learn from observations, teachers, and their own exploration and play. She uses computational modelling to explain how learning occurs in these different contexts.

Bonawitz's most cited research is about how explicit instructions from an adult affects preschool children's exploratory play. In one group, 25 preschool children received direct instructions and demonstrations of the functions of a toy, while the other groups were given limited or indirect instructions. The findings indicate that children who were given explicit instructions on the functions of a toy did not discover the toy's other functions. The children who were not given direct instructions on the toy would explore more and discover other functions of the toy and explored cause and effect. The study also showed that children who overheard the experimenter talk about the functions of the toy would restrict their exploration of the toy. Bonawitz also suggests that while there are tradeoffs in giving children direct instructions, children will also explore more than what was told to them if they rationally deduce that there's more information to learn and explore.

Bonawitz's second most cited study on google scholar explores how children's exploratory play supports causal inferences. Bonawitz's hypothesizes that children's exploratory play would be affected by the quality of evidence they observe. The study found that when children are in unclear situations, they are more likely to experiment and explore.

== Grants and fellowships ==
Bonawitz's research program has been funded by the National Science Foundation (NSF). One NSF-funded project “Developing an early understanding of contagion in preschool- and kindergarten-aged children” was a collaboration between Bonawitz, Nina Fefferman, and Vanessa LoBue. The purpose of this study was to assess the effectiveness of a storybook intervention on illness transmission for preschool and kindergarten children. This research is important because incorrect theories and misinformation about illness and contagion are difficult to ameliorate in adulthood.

Another NSF-funded project "Cognitive Mechanisms of Guided Instruction in the Early Elementary Years" aimed to examine how different teaching styles such as direct and guided query instructions affect elementary school children's learning and motivation in science. This is a longitudinal study which will span for 3.5 years and is estimated to finish in 2028.

Bonawitz is the Principal Investigator for the "Learning Minds: Creating Impact Science Program" funded by a Jacobs Foundation CRISP Fellowship. The purpose of this study is to investigate the impact of science interventions in elementary school.

== Representative publications ==
- Bonawitz, E., Denison, S., Griffiths, T. L., & Gopnik, A. (2014). Probabilistic models, learning algorithms, and response variability: sampling in cognitive development. Trends in Cognitive Sciences, 18(10), 497-500. https://doi.org/10.1016/j.tics.2014.06.006
- Bonawitz, E. B., & Lombrozo, T. (2012). Occam's rattle: children's use of simplicity and probability to constrain inference. Developmental Psychology, 48(4), 1156-1164. https://doi.org/10.1037/a0026471
- Bonawitz, E., Shafto, P., Gweon, H., Goodman, N. D., Spelke, E., & Schulz, L. (2011). The double-edged sword of pedagogy: Instruction limits spontaneous exploration and discovery. Cognition, 120(3), 322-330. https://doi.org/10.1016/j.cognition.2010.10.001
- Bonawitz, E., Ullman, T. D., Bridgers, S., Gopnik, A., & Tenenbaum, J. B. (2019). Sticking to the evidence? A behavioral and computational case study of micro‐theory change in the domain of magnetism. Cognitive Science, 43(8), e12765. https://doi.org/10.1111/cogs.12765
- Bonawitz, E. B., van Schijndel, T. J., Friel, D., & Schulz, L. (2012). Children balance theories and evidence in exploration, explanation, and learning. Cognitive Psychology, 64(4), 215-234. https://doi.org/10.1016/j.cogpsych.2011.12.002
- Wang, J., Yang, Y., Macias, C., & Bonawitz, E. (2021). Children with more uncertainty in their intuitive theories seek domain-relevant information. Psychological Science, 32(7), 1147-1156. https://doi.org/10.1177/0956797621994230
