= 2024 Summer Olympics closing ceremony =

Event on 11 August 2024

- Part of 2024 Summer Olympics
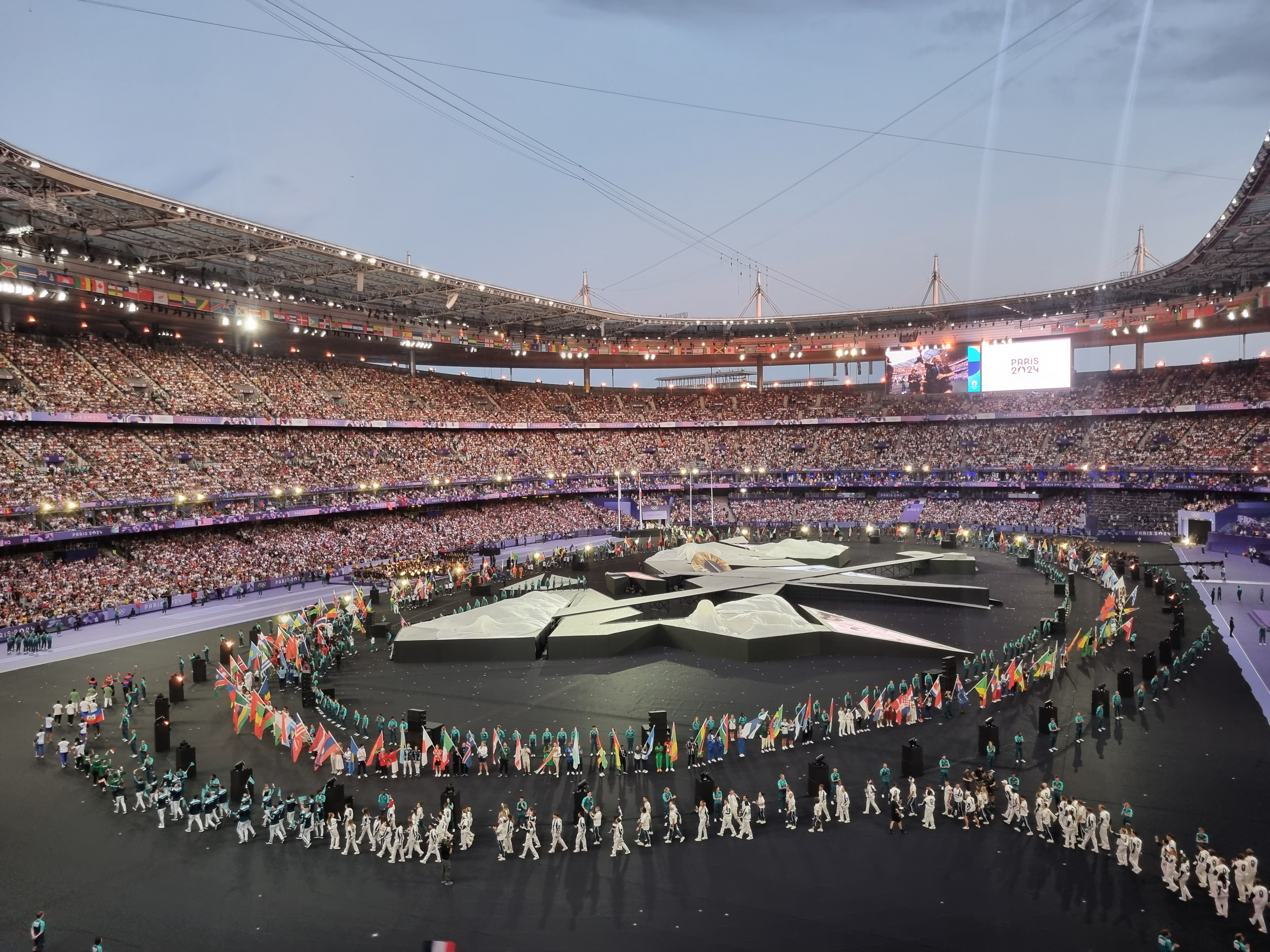
- Parade of flag bearers and athletes
- Date: 11 August 2024; 23 months ago
- Time: 21:00 – 00:10 CEST (UTC+2)
- Venue: Stade de France
- Location: Saint-Denis, France; 48.9245°N 2.3602°E
- Also known as: Records (Recordings/Memories)
- Filmed by: Olympic Broadcasting Services (OBS)
- Footage: 2024 Summer Olympics Closing Ceremony in Olympic Channel on YouTube

The closing ceremony of the 2024 Summer Olympics took place at the Stade de France in Saint-Denis on 11 August 2024.

As per traditional Olympic protocol, the ceremony featured cultural presentations from both the current (France) and following (United States) host countries, as well as closing remarks by International Olympic Committee (IOC) President Thomas Bach and the COJOP2024 President Tony Estanguet; the official handover of the Olympic flag from Paris mayor Anne Hidalgo to Los Angeles mayor Karen Bass, whose city would host the 2028 Summer Olympics; and the extinguishing of the Olympic flame. The ceremony featured a mix of filmed and live segments, which included the second half of the Los Angeles 2028 presentation, recorded in Long Beach, California.

== Preparations ==
As with the opening ceremony, the closing ceremony was directed by Thomas Jolly; he stated that the ceremony would be a "visual, very choreographic, very acrobatic show with an operatic dimension", with a storyline "in which the Olympic Games disappear once again, and someone from far comes along and finds them". In the wake of the opening ceremony controversies, executive director Thierry Reboul stated that the team had been asked to review and revise the closing ceremony a number of times in order to ensure that no scene could be misinterpreted in an offensive manner.

The director of the ceremony said of the event:

I've designed a show in which the Olympic Games disappear once again, and someone from far comes along and founds them. It's a very visual, very choreographic, very acrobatic show with an operatic dimension to give a great visual fresco and say goodbye to athletes from all over the world.

French bands Air and Phoenix performed during the ceremony; Reboul explained that "today, where we look at the history of music, it's certainly the French music style and the artists behind it, who have had the biggest resonance in the world. So it was important for us to acknowledge it".

In October 2023, British-American producer Ben Winston and his studio Fulwell 73 were commissioned to produce the cultural presentation by Los Angeles, the host city of 2028. Variety reported that the segment, titled the LA28 Handover Celebration, would feature performances by American artists and Los Angeles County natives Red Hot Chili Peppers, Snoop Dogg, and Billie Eilish, and include a live stadium appearance by American actor Tom Cruise.

== Proceedings ==
The closing ceremony took place at the Stade de France and, as per tradition, involved a parade of flags and athletes and the handover ceremony. It was officially titled "Records" and paid tribute to Greek antiquity as the birthplace of the "Olympic spirit" as well as portraying the revival of the Olympics by the French baron Pierre de Coubertin. It featured over 100 performers, acrobats, dancers and circus artists; about 9,000 athletes took part.

=== Prelude ===
The ceremonies began at the Tuileries Garden with Zaho de Sagazan and the Haendel-Hendrix Academy Choir singing "Sous le ciel de Paris", originally sung by Jean Bretonnière and popularized by Édith Piaf. The Olympic cauldron, a light and water display simulating the Olympic flame, was turned off. The actual flame, which was kept nearby in the lantern used to transport it to France aboard the Belem, was taken by French swimmer Léon Marchand, who won four gold medals at the Paris 2024 Games, to the stadium.

=== Parade of flag bearers ===
In the stadium, where the surface had been made to resemble a planisphere, the ceremony was accompanied by the Orchestre Divertimento, conducted by Zahia Ziouani. After IOC President Thomas Bach and President of the French Republic Emmanuel Macron were welcomed, the orchestra played the French national anthem, arranged by Victor Le Masne—the same arrangement used during the 2020 Summer Olympics closing ceremony three years earlier.

The flag-bearers entered the stadium, with the Greek and Olympic flags (representing the Refugee Olympic Team) entering first and the American and French flags entering last, followed by the athletes grouped into their teams entering in no particular order. The start of the ceremony included expressions of gratitude to the Games' volunteers and audience participation in karaoke of Joe Dassin's "Les Champs-Elysées" and a synchronized light show. Other songs, such as Charles Aznavour's "Emmenez-moi", Gala's "Freed From Desire" and Queen's "We Are the Champions", then played in the stadium.

=== Marathon medal ceremony ===
The presentation included the medal ceremony for the women’s marathon, which had finished earlier in the day, chosen to commemorate the Olympics’ gender parity for the first time. The top three, Sifan Hassan of the Netherlands, Tigst Assefa of Ethiopia, and Hellen Obiri of Kenya, were awarded their medals by IOC President Thomas Bach and World Athletics President Sebastian Coe. The national anthem of the Netherlands was played for Dutch gold medalist Sifan Hassan, and the newest inductees to the IOC Athletes' Commission thanked the volunteers.

Women's marathon medalists

- Sifan Hassan (NED)
- Tigst Assefa (ETH)
- Hellen Obiri (KEN)

=== Records ===
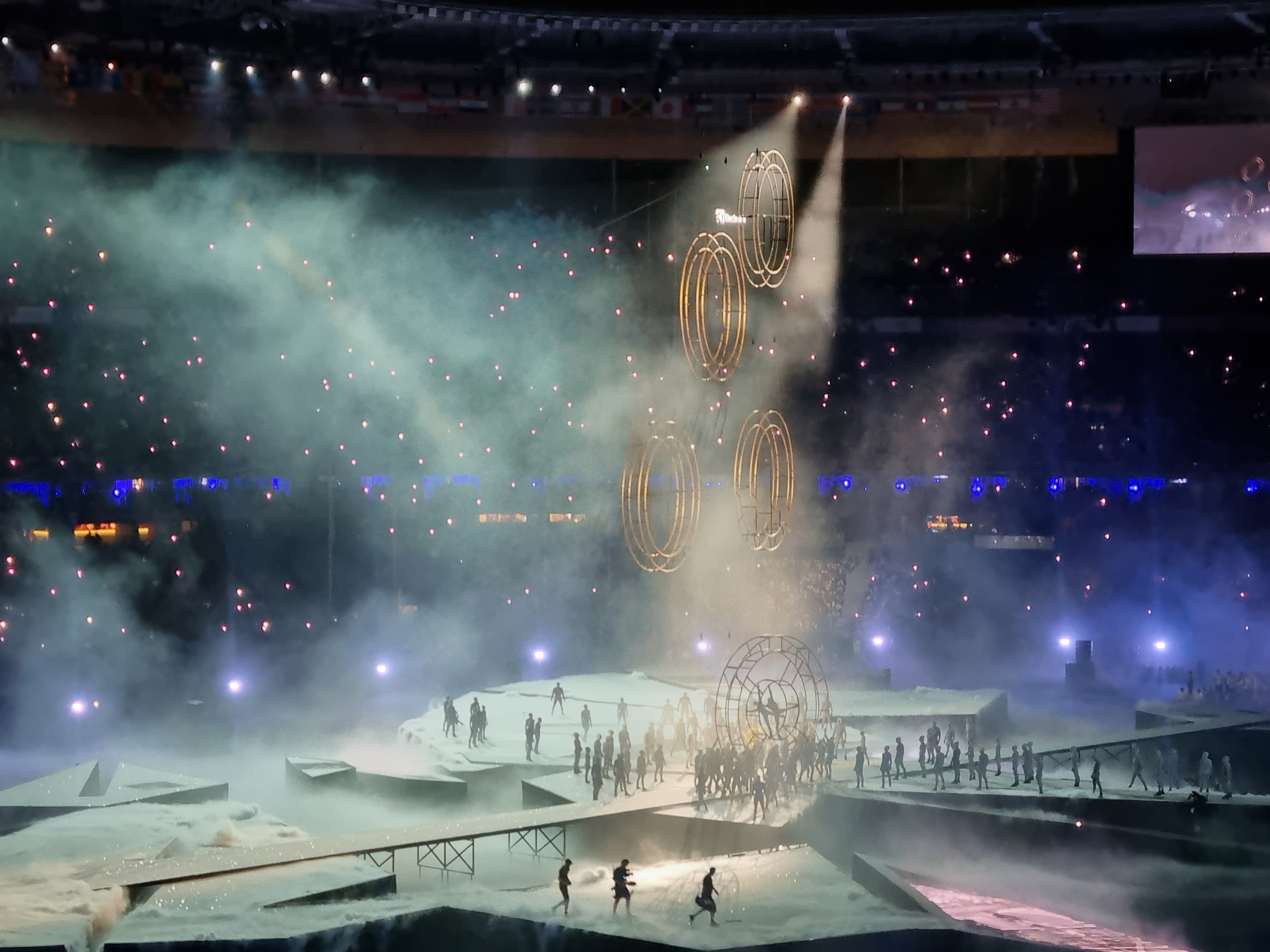
The Olympic rings being lifted up.

Then the cultural segments began, depicting a world where the Olympic Games were lost, and paying homage to the French baron and Parisian Pierre de Coubertin, who was instrumental in reviving the Olympics for modern times: the stadium went dark, and a golden-winged humanoid alien named the Golden Voyager (named after the French-made Voyager Golden Record brought aboard the two Voyager program space probes, the first man-made objects to leave the heliosphere [itself named after the Greek god Helios]; the organizers also said it represented "the spirit of the Bastille" as well as modern depictions of the Greco-Roman god Apollo), portrayed by dancer Arthur Cadre, descended from its roof onto a white stage shaped like a stylized world map. The Golden Voyager costume, along with more than 120 further looks worn by the ceremony's dancers, was designed by Swiss designer Kevin Germanier from upcycled materials, including textiles from LVMH's Nona Source platform and gold beads and sequins diverted from landfill. The Golden Voyager encountered and interacted with the masked torchbearer and the hooded horsewoman, the two main characters from the opening ceremony, who presented the flag of Greece. The orchestra and choir then performed an ethereal electronic arrangement of the Greek national anthem. Afterwards, the Golden Voyager, aided by descending dancers and acrobats dressed in grey zentai suits, mimed an archaeological excavation from the stage, revealing a large copy of the Winged Victory of Samothrace statue of Nike, placed in the Louvre main entrance, and five large brass rings. Swiss musician and daredevil Alain Roche appeared in a suit made from recycled magnetic tapes, playing the first two stanzas from the Delphic Hymns on a grand piano suspended in midair, with the broad side opened, lit up and facing the audience, as tenor Benjamin Bernheim sang the hymns' lyrics while standing in one of the rings. The rings were then attached to wires and lifted up to form the Olympic rings.

=== Concert segments ===
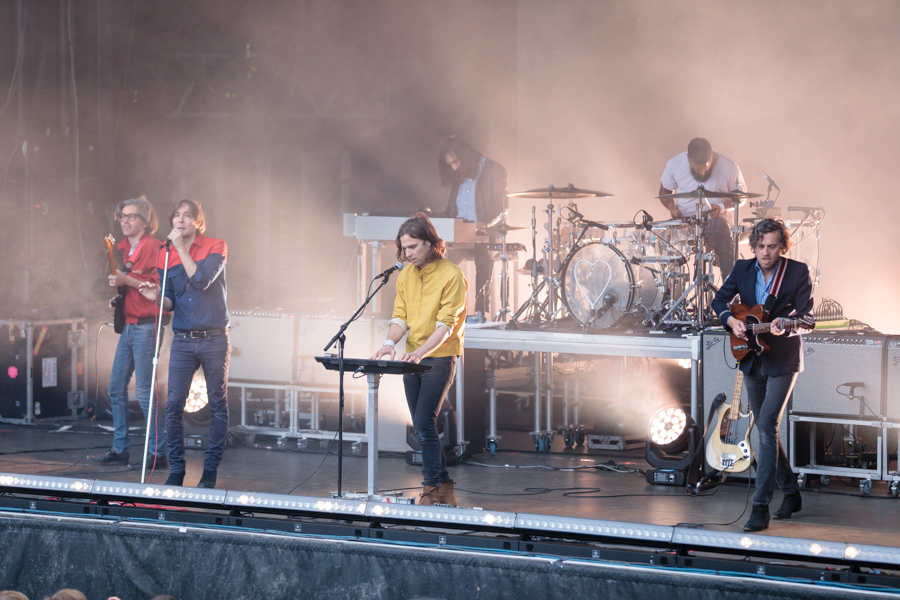
Phoenix (pictured in 2018)

French band Phoenix made a showcase with Ezra Koenig of Vampire Weekend, Air, Angèle, Vannda, and Kavinsky to perform a medley of songs at the main stage:

- Phoenix – "Love Like a Sunset, Pt. II"
- Phoenix – "Lisztomania"
- Kavinsky, Angèle, Phoenix – "Nightcall"
- Phoenix – "If I Ever Feel Better"
- Phoenix – "Funky Squaredance"
- Vannda – "Time To Rise" (with Phoenix)
- Air, Gordon Tracks – "Playground Love" (with Phoenix)
- Phoenix, Ezra Koenig – "Tonight"
- Phoenix – "1901"

During the performance, numerous athletes climbed onto the stage and danced alongside the performers, which was not authorized by the organizers; loudspeakers ordered the athletes to leave the stage, while security officers and volunteers went up to remove them.

=== Protocolar segments ===
Head of COJOP Tony Estanguet and President of the IOC Thomas Bach made their speeches escorted by six Olympic medalists:

- Europe: Teddy Riner (FRA)
- Oceania: Emma McKeon (AUS)
- Asia: Sun Yingsha (CHN)
- IOC Refugee Olympic Team: Cindy Ngamba (EOR)
- Africa: Eliud Kipchoge (KEN)
- Americas: Mijaín López (CUB)

Estanguet opined that the national mood had turned from dour to ecstatic, said the Games were "imperfect" but called them a "huge success" and he had "no regrets", and noted that the Games were marked by the most marriage proposals among participating athletes; he then called for France and the world to join Paris and support the 2024 Summer Paralympics. Bach said, "Dear French friends, you have fallen in love with the Olympic Games. And we have fallen in love with all of you," thanked the Refugee Olympic Team for their "inspiring" performance, noted the athlete delegations had reached 1:1 gender parity, expressed hope for a new generation of IOC leadership, reflected that the Games would be his last, and made a pun that they were "Seine-sational", to much groaning from the audience. The Olympic Anthem was then performed by the orchestra and the Maîtrise de Fontainebleau children's choir in English, as the Olympic Flag was lowered. The flag would be raised again in Milan and Cortina d'Ampezzo, Italy during the opening ceremony at San Siro on the evening of 6 February 2026.

=== Antwerp ceremony and the LA28 Handover Celebration ===
During the first part of Thomas Bach's speech, Estanguet retrieved the Olympic flag and handed it to the mayor of Paris, Anne Hidalgo. After Bach concluded his speech, the "Antwerp Ceremony" began: Hidalgo handed the flag over to Bach, who then handed the flag to the mayor of Los Angeles, Karen Bass. After waving the flag, she then handed it to American gymnast Simone Biles. This was the second consecutive Olympics in which the Olympic flag was passed between two female mayors, following 2020, which was held three years earlier in 2021, where the Governor of Tokyo, Yuriko Koike handed the flag to Hidalgo during the 2020 Olympics closing ceremony. Bass was also the first Black female mayor to receive the Olympic flag.

The American flag was then raised to the national anthem of the United States, performed by R&B singer H.E.R. accompanied by musical director Alonzo Harris. Afterwards, actor Tom Cruise abseiled from the Stade de France roof (to the "Theme from Mission: Impossible" rearranged on guitar, performed by H.E.R.), retrieved the Olympic flag from Mayor Bass and Biles and departed the stadium, carrying it on a motorcycle. A pre-recorded segment depicted Cruise riding through the streets of Paris before boarding a transport plane, skydiving, and delivering the flag to the Hollywood Hills where Cruise passed the flag to mountain biker Kate Courtney, then it was relayed to sprinter Michael Johnson and then to skateboarder Jagger Eaton. The video showed landmarks such as the Hollywood Sign, which was later modified by Cruise to recreate the Olympic rings in the double Os of "Hollywood", and the Los Angeles Memorial Coliseum, which will become the first stadium to host three Olympic Games. This segment was a nod to the U.S. film and television industry which is the United States' biggest cultural export and is heavily based in Los Angeles.

This was followed by a broadcast from Long Beach, California, featuring performances from the Red Hot Chili Peppers ("By the Way" being heard during the Olympic Flag's journey and "Can't Stop" performed on stage), Billie Eilish with her brother Finneas O'Connell on guitars ("Birds of a Feather"), (Note: The Red Hot Chili Peppers and Eilish also each performed a second song on stage, "Eddie" and "The Greatest" respectively, but their footages were left out of the presentation due to time constraints.) and Snoop Dogg and Dr. Dre ("Drop It Like It's Hot" by Snoop Dogg alone and "The Next Episode" with Dr. Dre). The segment was well-received in the international press for showcasing U.S. entertainment and star power. The entire sequence, including the concert from Long Beach, was shown on the Stade de France's video boards.

=== Extinguishing the Olympic flame ===
The ceremony's penultimate section started with Marchand entering the stadium with the lantern containing the Olympic flame. Bach declared the games officially closed as the two, along with the athletes who escorted him representing the continents and refugees, blew out the flame, similar to the extinguishing act of the Athens 2004 Olympics closing ceremony. Bach then called upon the world's youth to assemble in four years in Los Angeles. The section ended with a French flag handover, from Antoine Dupont, closing ceremony flagbearer, to part of the French Paralympic team, symbolizing the 16 days of transition from the Olympic Games to the Paralympic Games.

=== Finale ===
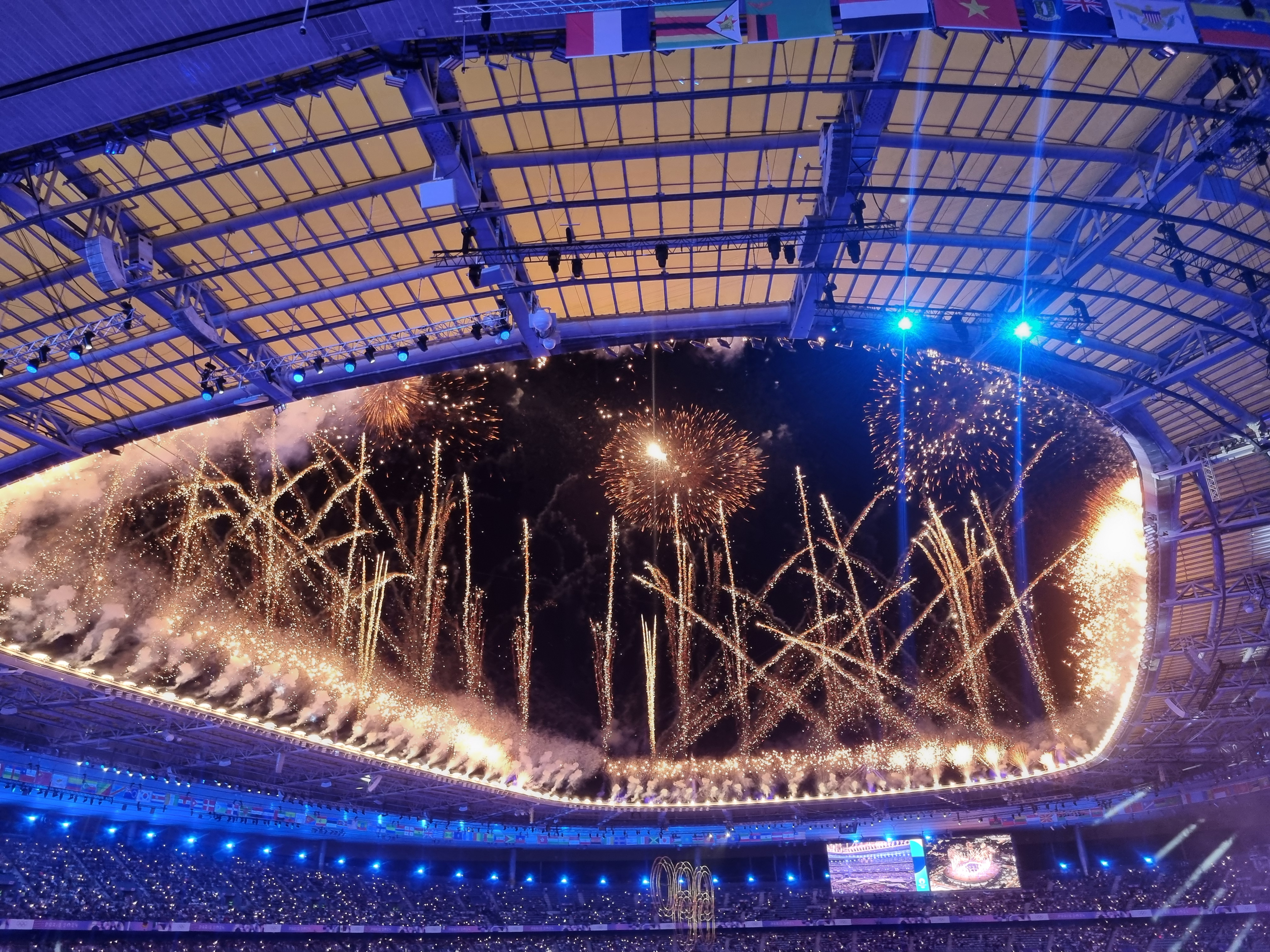
The final fireworks show

The ceremony closed with Yseult performing the Frank Sinatra song "My Way", which was adapted to English by Paul Anka from the French song "Comme d'habitude" by Claude François. Afterward, a spectacular fireworks display was set off from the Stade de France roof.

== Anthems ==
- National Anthem of France – Orchestre Divertimento, conducted by Zahia Ziouani
- National Anthem of Greece – Orchestre Divertimento, conducted by Zahia Ziouani
- (International Olympic Committee) Olympic Anthem – Orchestre Divertimento, conducted by Zahia Ziouani and Maîtrise de Fontainebleau children's choir
- National Anthem of the United States – H.E.R.

=== Victory ceremony ===
- National Anthem of the Netherlands (Note: Anthem played as part of the medal ceremony for the Women's marathon victory ceremony.)
