= Catherine Snow =

Catherine Snow may refer to:

- Catherine Mandeville Snow, last woman hanged in Newfoundland, Canada
- Catherine E. Snow, educational psychologist and language acquisition researcher
