= Jack Shonkoff =

American pediatrician

Jack P. Shonkoff
- Scientific career
- Fields: Pediatrics, Stress
- Workplaces: Harvard Graduate School of Education, Harvard Medical School, Boston Children's Hospital, Massachusetts General Hospital, Brandeis University.

Jack P. Shonkoff is an American pediatrician, currently the Julius B. Richmond FAMRI Professor of Child Health and Development at Harvard T.H. Chan School of Public Health and Harvard Graduate School of Education as well as Professor of Pediatrics at Harvard Medical School and Boston Children's Hospital. He is a member of the research staff at Massachusetts General Hospital and serves as Director of the Center on the Developing Child at Harvard University. He currently chairs the National Scientific Council on the Developing Child, and the JPB Research Network on Toxic stress.

He was formerly the Samuel F. and Rose B. Gingold Professor of Human Development and Social Policy and Dean of the Heller School for Social Policy and Management at Brandeis University.

Under the auspices of the National Academy of Sciences, he served as chair of the board on Children, Youth, and Families from 1997 to 2000 and led a blue-ribbon committee that produced a report in 2000 entitled, From Neurons to Neighborhoods: The Science of Early Childhood Development. He also served as a member of the Panel on Child Care Policy, the Committee on the Assessment of Family Violence Interventions, and the Roundtable on Head Start Research.

Shonkoff has received multiple honors, including elected membership to the Institute of Medicine (now the National Academy of Medicine) of the National Academy of Sciences, the C. Anderson Aldrich Award in Child Development from the American Academy of Pediatrics, the Award for Distinguished Contributions to Public Policy for Children from the Society for Research in Child Development, and the 2019 LEGO Prize.
