= Sandra Sucher =

American economist

Sandra J. Sucher is an American economist, currently the MBA Class of 1966 Professor of Management Practice and the Joseph L. Rice, III Faculty Fellow at Harvard Business School. Previously, she worked in private industry and nonprofit management, including 10 years in fashion retailing and 12 years at Fidelity Investments as chief quality officer.

== Education ==
Sucher received an MBA from Harvard Business School; Masters of Arts in Teaching from the Harvard Graduate School of Education and a BA from the University of Michigan.
