= Lorna Hodgkinson =

Australian psychologist and educator (1887–1951)

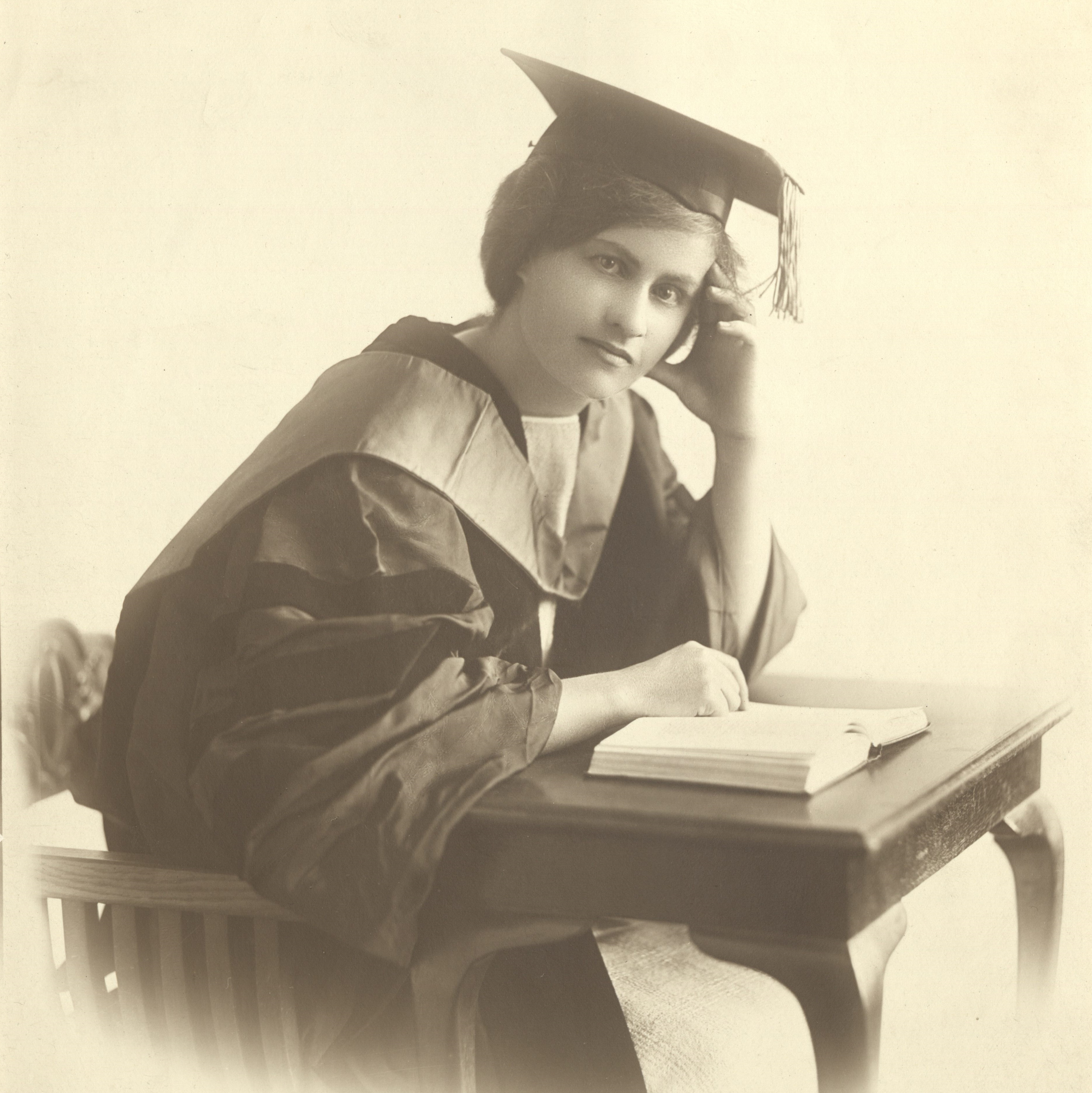
- Hodgkinson c. 1922
- Born: Lorna Myrtle Hodgkinson; 13 May 1887; South Yarra, Melbourne
- Died: 24 March 1951 (aged 63); Gore Hill, Sydney
- Education: Harvard University (MEd; DEd)
- Occupations: Educator and educational psychologist
- Known for: First woman to receive a Doctor of Education degree from Harvard University

Lorna Myrtle Hodgkinson (13 May 1887 – 24 March 1951) was an Australian educator and educational psychologist who worked with intellectually disabled children. She was the first woman to receive a Doctor of Education degree from Harvard University. She called out the poor system in Australia and her reputation was ruined by the minister responsible.

== Early life ==
Hodgkinson was born on 13 May 1887 in South Yarra, a suburb of Melbourne, to Ada Josephine (née Edmiston) and Albert James Hodgkinson, a sugar planter. The family lived at North Creek, the farming district immediately north of Ballina that would later become known as Lennox Head. Albert's father James Hodgkinson had come to the Richmond River in the 1860s having formerly been a squatter in Victoria; by the 1880s James and Albert together held nearly 2,000 acres in the district, including the elevated headland property that would become Lennox Head. Albert's homestead stood on a property he called "Stonyhurst". The five-acre site of the second North Creek Public School (from 1897) was resumed from the Hodgkinson family's estate, and the school that served the district until 1961 stood on land that had formed part of Lorna's childhood home. After her father's death, Lorna and her mother moved to Perth, where she studied at Perth Girls' School and began working as a student teacher in 1903.

== Career ==
Hodgkinson became an assistant at the Perth Infants' School in 1907 and started a class for children with intellectual disabilities. She left Perth in 1912 to move to Sydney, where she taught at various public schools until 1915. In 1917 she began working at May Villa in Parramatta, teaching intellectually disabled girls who were wards of the state. She was granted paid leave in 1920 to study at Harvard University; she received a Master of Education degree in 1921 and her Doctorate of Education in 1922. With her doctoral thesis, "A State Program for the Diagnosis and Treatment of Atypical Children in Public School Systems", she became the first woman to receive the degree of Doctor of Education from Harvard.

When Hodgkinson returned from Harvard to Sydney in 1922, she took up a position created for her by the NSW Department of Education: Superintendent of the Education of Mental Defectives. In 1923 she testified before the Royal Commission on Lunacy Law and Administration that the system for caring for intellectually disabled children was mismanaged; her comments sparked protests from the public and a ministerial inquiry was ordered by minister Albert Bruntnell. Hodgkinson was accused of falsifying her educational record in order to gain admission to Harvard, and after the inquiry found against her on all accounts, she was suspended for "disgraceful and improper conduct in making false statements and pretences". She was demoted to normal public teaching in 1924, but she refused to take up her new position and was dismissed. The dean of the Harvard Graduate School of Education later wrote a statement to confirm her abilities and achievements.

After being publicly humiliated, Hodgkinson left the public education system and founded the Sunshine Institute, a residential school for intellectually disabled children, in the Sydney suburb of Gore Hill. She worked there for the rest of her career, building the school up from six to sixty pupils. She gave lectures on "mental hygiene" on the radio, wrote for the Sydney Morning Herald, and addressed the Women's Reform League and the Australian Racial Hygiene Congress.

== Death ==
Hodgkinson died of cancer at Gore Hill on 24 March 1951. The Sunshine Institute was later renamed the Lorna Hodgkinson Sunshine Home, and is still in operation as Unisson Disability.
