= Rhea Paul =

Clinical language scientist

- Occupations: Research scientist, speech pathologist

Academic background
- Education: Brandeis University; Harvard University; University of Wisconsin–Madison

Academic work
- Institutions: Sacred Heart University; Haskins Laboratories
- Main interests: Language and Communication disorders, Autism Spectrum Disorder

Rhea Paul is an American clinical language scientist known for her work in the field of speech-language pathology. She was Founding Chair in the Department of Speech-Language Pathology in the College of Health Professions at Sacred Heart University and a research scientist and affiliate of Haskins Laboratories at Yale University.

In 1997, Paul received the Editor's Award from the American Journal of Speech-Language Pathology for her paper "Clinical implications of the natural history of slow expressive language development." In 2010, Paul received the Slifka/Ritvo Innovation in Autism Research Award given by the International Society for Autism Research. In 2014, she received Honors of the Association Award from the American Speech Language Hearing Association for her contributions to the field of communicative disorders.

== Biography ==
Paul graduated with her B.A in sociology from Brandeis University in 1971 before attending the Harvard Graduate School of Education where she earned her Ed. M in Reading and Learning Disabilities. Paul completed her Ph.D. in the field of Communication Disorders at the University of Wisconsin–Madison in 1981. Her doctoral dissertation focused on the analysis of children's understanding of surface structure cues during reading tasks. Upon graduating with her Ph.D., Paul worked with Donald Cohen to produce work related to typical communicative development and associated disorders.

Rhea served as Editor of the Journal of Speech, Language, and Hearing Research (2013-2017) and Associate Editor of the Journal of Autism and Developmental Disorders (2008-2011).

== Research ==
Throughout her career, Paul has focused on the analysis of patterns of speech development of individuals diagnosed with autism and developmental language disorders. In 2004, Paul co-founded a committee within the American Speech and Hearing Association dedicated to providing clinical guidance for the assessment of clients with autism.

In 2020, Paul received a $1.25 million federal grant from the U.S. Department of Education. The funds from this grant will primarily be used as scholarship funds for graduate students at Sacred Heart University who are interested in working with children diagnosed with autism.

Paul has authored several textbooks and manuals related to the assessment and intervention of speech-language disorders in childhood and adolescence. Paul participated in the CATALISE Consortium, a multi-phase Delphi study that aimed to identify and streamline the terminology used by researchers and practitioners when discussing children's speech and language problems. The efforts of the CATALISE Consortium led to updating diagnostic criteria and replacing the label Specific Language Impairment with the label Developmental Language Disorder.

== Selected publications ==
- Chawarska, K., Klin, A., Paul, R. and Volkmar, F. (2007), Autism spectrum disorder in the second year: stability and change in syndrome expression. Journal of Child Psychology and Psychiatry, 48,128-138.
- Paul, R., Augustyn, A., Klin, A., & Volkmar, F. R. (2005). Perception and production of prosody by speakers with autism spectrum disorders. Journal of Autism and Developmental Disorders, 35(2), 205–220.
- Paul, R., Orlovski, S. M., Marcinko, H. C., & Volkmar, F. (2009). Conversational behaviors in youth with high-functioning ASD and Asperger syndrome. Journal of Autism and Developmental Disorders, 39(1), 115–125.
- Paul, R., & Smith, R. L. (1993). Narrative skills in 4-year-olds with normal, impaired, and late-developing language. Journal of Speech, Language, and Hearing Research, 36(3), 592–598.
- Tager-Flusberg, H., Paul, R., & Lord, C. (2005). Language and Communication in Autism. In F. R. Volkmar, R. Paul, A. Klin, & D. Cohen (Eds.), Handbook of autism and pervasive developmental disorders: Diagnosis, development, neurobiology, and behavior (pp. 335–364). John Wiley & Sons Inc.

=== Books ===
- Paul, R. (2007). Language disorders from infancy through adolescence: Assessment & intervention. Elsevier Health Sciences.
- Paul, R. & Fahim, D. (2016). Let's talk: Navigating communication services and supports for your young child with autism. Paul H. Brookes Publishing Co.
- Paul, R., Norbury, C. F., Gosse, C. (2018). Language disorders from infancy through adolescence: Listening, speaking, reading, writing, and communicating (5th Edition). Elsevier Inc.
- Paul, R., & Simmons, E. S. (2020). Introduction to clinical methods in communication disorders (4th Edition). Paul H. Brookes Publishing Co.
