= Meredith Rowe =

Developmental psychologist

- Occupations: Saul Zaentz Professor of Early Learning and Development

Academic background
- Education: University of Rochester (BA, MS); Harvard Graduate School of Education (EdM, EdD)
- Thesis: A longitudinal investigation of factors related to maternal communicative input and child vocabulary growth in low -income American families (2003)
- Doctoral advisor: Catherine Snow

Academic work
- Institutions: Harvard Graduate School of Education
- Website: https://www.meredith-rowe.com/

Meredith L. Rowe is an American educational psychologist known for her work on how environmental factors influence learning, particularly the role of parents and families in children's early language and literacy development. Her research investigates key aspects of children's early communicative environments that promote language and cognitive growth, with the goal of using these insights to design intervention strategies for caregivers. She holds the position of the Saul Zaentz Professor of Early Learning and Development at the Harvard Graduate School of Education.

== Biography ==
Rowe received her bachelor's degree in psychology from the University of Rochester in 1993, where she also received her master's degree in Human Development in 1995. She then moved to the Harvard Graduate School of Education, where she completed her Master of Education (EdM) in 1999 and her Doctorate in Education (EdD) in Human Development and Psychology in 2003. Her dissertation titled A Longitudinal Investigation of Factors Related to Maternal Communicative Input and Child Vocabulary Growth in Low-Income American Families was supervised by Catherine Snow. Her dissertation was supported by a grant from the American Educational Research Association.

Rowe was a postdoctoral fellow at the University of Chicago in the psychology and sociology departments from 2003 to 2009. In July 2009, she became an assistant professor in the Department of Human Development and Quantitative Methodology at the University of Maryland. Following these experiences, Rowe returned to the Harvard Graduate School of Education in 2014 as an associate professor, and was later promoted to professor in 2018. Since then, Rowe has served as the Co-Chair of the Human Development and Psychology EdM Program as well as the Human Development and Education EdM Program. Rowe has also established the Rowe Lab which studies the role of social interactions in children's cognitive development.

Rowe is married to Christian Hart Nibbrig III from Waltham, Massachusetts. Rowe's parents are Valerie A. Rowe, emeritus professor of education at Fordham University Graduate School of Education and John W. Rowe, the former chief executive officer of Aetna.

== Research ==
Rowe's expertise is on language and cognitive development during early childhood. She focuses on how development is affected by factors such as the role of parents, socioeconomic status, and culture. A central theme in her work is the role of child-directed speech and early gestures in language development. Rowe's publications have been cited numerous times by organizations, including the U.S. Department of Education and the National Institutes of Health, and have been published in leading education and psychology journals, including Science, Child Development, Developmental Science, and Developmental Psychology. The National Institutes of Health has awarded Rowe several grants including a Career Transition Award, EDU Core Research (ECR) program award, as well as an Exploratory/Developmental Research grant to fund her intervention work.

Rowe has been involved in developing apps through the Reach Every Reader initiative at the Harvard Graduate School of Education which aim to facilitate parent-child interaction and conversations to support early literacy. These apps prioritize the importance of quality over quantity in communication, encouraging parents to talk with their children rather than at them. Rowe emphasizes the pivotal role of social interaction in early childhood education, where children develop key language and social skills through relationships with peers and teachers. During the COVID-19 pandemic, she raised the question of whether these crucial experiences would be sufficiently replicated in the context of remote learning, mentioning that sitting at a desk may compromise the development of foundational skills in young children. She has also discussed the lack of urgency in addressing reading struggles in affluent school districts. She notes that some parents hire tutors, which can mask reading performance discrepancies on standardized Massachusetts Comprehensive Assessment System (MCAS) test scores. She highlights the need to implement evidence-based reading instruction to close achievement gaps.

== Books ==
- LeVine, R. A., LeVine, S., Schnell-Anzola, B., Rowe, M. L., & Dexter, E. (2011). Literacy and mothering: How women's schooling changes the lives of the world's children. Oxford University Press. https://doi.org/10.1093/acprof:oso/9780195309829.001.0001
- Rowe, M. L. (2021). An interesting word for every day of the year: Fascinating words for first readers (M. Forsberg, Illus.). Magic Cat Publishing.
- Rowe, M. L. (2021). 365 words for clever kids! (M. Forsberg, Illus.). Harry N. Abrams.
- Rowe, M. L. (2024). 365 first words for little kids!: A word for every day! (M. Forsberg, Illus.). Magic Cat.

== Selected publications ==
- Rowe, M. L. (2008). Child-directed speech: Relation to socioeconomic status, knowledge of child development and child vocabulary skill. Journal of Child Language, 35(1), 185-205. https://doi.org/10.1017/S0305000907008343
- Rowe, M. L. (2012). A longitudinal investigation of the role of quantity and quality of child‐directed speech in vocabulary development. Child development, 83(5), 1762-1774. https://doi.org/10.1111/j.1467-8624.2012.01805.x
- Rowe, M. L., & Goldin-Meadow, S. (2009). Differences in early gesture explain SES disparities in child vocabulary size at school entry. Science, 323(5916), 951-953. https://doi.org/10.1126/science.1167025
- Rowe, M. L., & Goldin‐Meadow, S. (2009). Early gesture selectively predicts later language learning. Developmental science, 12(1), 182-187. https://doi.org/10.1111/j.1467-7687.2008.00764.x
- Rowe, M. L., Özçalışkan, Ş., & Goldin-Meadow, S. (2008). Learning words by hand: Gesture's role in predicting vocabulary development. First language, 28(2), 182-199. https://doi.org/10.1177/0142723707088310
