= Zahia Ziouani =

French conductor

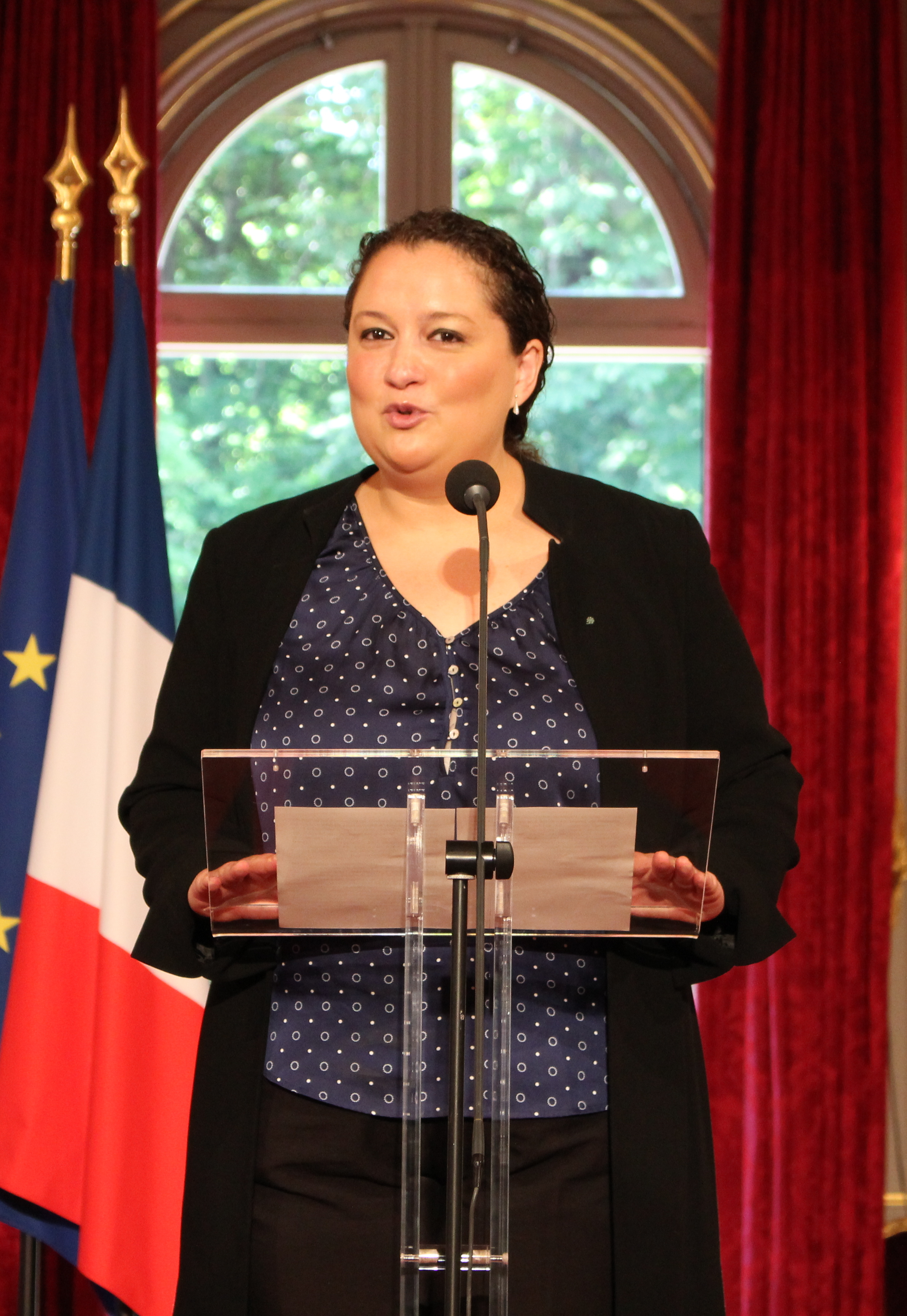
- Ziouani in 2015
- Born: Zahia-Dyhia Ziouani; July 27, 1978 (age 47); Paris, France
- Education: Paris-Sorbonne University
- Occupation: Conductor

Zahia-Dyhia Ziouani (born 27 June 1978) is a French conductor and musician.

== Early life ==
Zahia Ziouani was born on June 27, 1978, in Paris to Algerian parents. In 1981, her family moved to Pantin where she still lives. Her twin sister is the cellist Fettouma Ziouani. Her father, a chef de rang in a restaurant near the Salle Pleyel, was passionate about classical music and influenced his daughters to develop an interest.

At the age of 8, she directed her school's choir and took guitar lessons at the local conservatory. At the age of 12, she learned the viola and joined the student orchestra, then aspired to become a professional conductor. She then studied at the Lycée Racine in Paris, who offered a double degree in music, then graduated in musical analysis, orchestration and musicology from the Paris-Sorbonne University and won several conservatory diplomas.

Zahia Ziouani studied conducting with Maestro Sergiu Celibidache at the Schola Cantorum de Paris. In 1998, she founded the Divertimento Symphony Orchestra, which she directs, bringing together 70 musicians and instrument teachers from Île-de-France, and of which she is the musical director. In 2007, she was appointed first guest conductor of the National Orchestra of Algeria as part of the event "Algiers, capital of Arab culture".

In July 2010, she was appointed a member of the advisory board of the Museum of the History of Immigration.

Her career was brought to the screen in 2022 in the film Divertimento by Marie-Castille Mention-Schaar, with actress Oulaya Amamra playing her. At the closing ceremony of the 2024 Summer Olympics in Paris on August 11, she conducted the symphony orchestra at the Stade de France in Saint-Denis.

== Honours ==
- Officer of the Ordre national du Mérite
- Commander of the Ordre des Arts et des Lettres
