= Zahia Marzouk =

Social worker and feminist

- Born: 1906
- Died: 1988 (aged 81–82)
- Known for: Family planning in Egypt

Zahia Marzouk (1906 – 1988) was an Egyptian social worker and feminist who founded Egypt's first family planning association.

== Biography ==
Marzouk was born in 1906, one of three sisters. Her father died when she was three but her mother managed to get all three girls educated. In 1923 Marzouk stopped wearing her veil, following the example of Huda Sha'arawi. With some support from her uncle even if her family didn't understand, Marzouk began a teaching career. She was chosen to study in London. She returned to Egypt in 1931 where she received an appointment to a teachers' college where Marzouk taught psychology. 1933, she went to the United States to the Harvard Graduate School of Education where she focused on medical social work, psychology, and children with problems. During the two years of study in the US, Marzouk worked with underprivileged families in Missouri and the mountains of Kentucky. She returned to Egypt in 1935 where she began Egypt's social work schools. They were in Alexandria and in Cairo. These led direction to Egypt's Ministry of Social Affairs, began in 1938. Marzouk worked there as a psychiatric social worker, the only woman in the department.

In 1937 Marzouk founded a small group to look at Egypt's demographic issues. The national population was growing. By the end of the year there was a formal conference which was sponsored by the Egyptian Medical Association. When Marzouk began to speak at the conference the audience who disapproved of her presence and involvement in such work threw tomatoes and eggs at her when she began. By the end of her talk she garnered applause.

Marzouk also founded an institution for children with a disability who needed physiotherapy. By the 1950s she had also created a number of institutions for the welfare of the family. Some of her institutions were the Regional Federation of Social Services, the Happy Childhood Association, the Institute for Training and Research in Family Planning and the Alexandria Family Planning Association.

Marzouk did not conform to local dress, she wore western style trousers and refused a veil. She was a skilled fund raiser and artist as well. She died in 1988.
