= Zahia Kaddoura =

Lebanese academic (1920–2002)

- Born: 1920; Beirut, Lebanon
- Died: 2002 (aged 81–82)

Zahia Kaddoura (1920–2002; Arabic: زاهية قدورة) was a Lebanese academic and a human and women's rights advocate. She served as a dean of the Lebanese University, and was the first woman to do so. Kaddoura was also the first Lebanese woman to earn a PhD from an Egyptian university.

== Education ==
Kaddoura studied Arabic and Islamic history for her PhD in Cairo. She became the first Lebanese woman to receive a PhD from an Egyptian university. She then returned to Beirut in 1951. Kaddoura received her Bachelor's degree in 1942 and her master's in 1947 from the American University of Beirut.

== Career and activism ==
After a battle with the administration of the Lebanese University, she was appointed as the Dean of Literature and Human Sciences, receiving an endorsement from the cabinet in 1971; she was the first woman ever to be appointed to a senior post at a Lebanese university. Her work and research concentrated around the topics of female intellectual productivity and the rights and contributions of modern Muslim women. During her time in Egypt, Kaddoura took part in various intellectual, social, and political events. From 1920 till 1943, Lebanon was still under French colonization, so Kaddoura was outspoken in her advocacy to give Lebanon its independence and freedom.

In 1959, the Lebanese government nominated Kaddoura to serve as a cultural advisor at the League of Arab States, but her nomination was turned down by Saudi Arabia. Her 1951 nomination under the Abdallah El-Yafi government to take the position of cultural attaché at the Lebanese delegation to Egypt was also rejected.

== Legacy ==
A book entitled Zahia Kaddoura: A Pioneer Intellectual, Educational & Patriotic Woman was written in her memory. The book highlights Kaddoura's approach to feminism, her fight for girls’ rights, and her academic achievements. In addition, the Zahia Kaddoura Public High School for Girls in Lebanon was named in honor of her achievements and work in the academic field.
