= Edward Zigler =

American developmental psychologist (1930–2019)

Edward Frank Zigler (March 1, 1930 – February 7, 2019) was an American developmental psychologist and Sterling Professor Emeritus of Psychology at Yale University. In addition to his academic research on child development, he was best known as one of the architects of the federal Head Start program.

== Early life and education ==
Zigler was born in Kansas City, Missouri to Frank Zigler and Gertrude Gleitman Zigler. He attended the University of Missouri, Kansas City, where he received a B.S. in 1954. The next year, Zigler matriculated at the University of Texas, where he received a PhD in developmental psychology in 1958.

== Career ==
Much of Zigler's applied research aimed to develop and improve services for disadvantaged children, such as those with intellectual disabilities, or children of poverty.

He taught one year at the University of Missouri at Columbia before joining the Yale School of Medicine faculty in 1959. In 1970, US President Richard Nixon appointed Zigler the first director of the Office of Child Development. There, Zigler worked to launch the Head Start program created under the Johnson Administration.

Among many additional public service contributions, he served as chair of the Vietnamese Children's Resettlement Advisory Group for President Ford, chaired the Fifteenth Anniversary Head Start Committee which President Carter tasked to plan the future course of the Head Start program, and helped to construct the Family and Medical Leave Act.

In 1978, Zigler founded the Bush Center for Child Development and Social Policy at Yale University with funding from the Bush Foundation of Minnesota. The focus of the center is to use the findings of empirical research on child development to inform public policy efforts to improve children's lives. The center was renamed as the Edward Zigler Center for Child Development and Social Policy in 2005.

Zigler's research on intellectual disabilities was among the first efforts to differentiate children based on the causes of their intellectual disabilities. His "two-group" approach to what was then referred to as "mental retardation," differentiated those children whose disabilities were believed to be caused by familial/environmental factors, from children with known biological cases, such as genetic syndromes. This work, which was influenced by the developmental theorist Heinz Werner, lay the foundation for more a meaningful taxonomy of intellectual disabilities, beyond IQ level alone.

Zigler also conducted research on schizophrenia, which similarly challenged the dominant classification system. Zigler's developmental approach to psychopathology represented a more theoretically informed typology. His work influenced generations of scholars.

In 2000, Zigler received the 6th Annual Heinz Award in Public Policy.

== Personal life ==
Zigler was married in 1955 to Bernice Gorelick (d. 2017) and the couple had one son, Scott. Zigler died in his sleep in North Haven, Connecticut on February 7, 2019.
