= Bridget Terry Long =

American economist

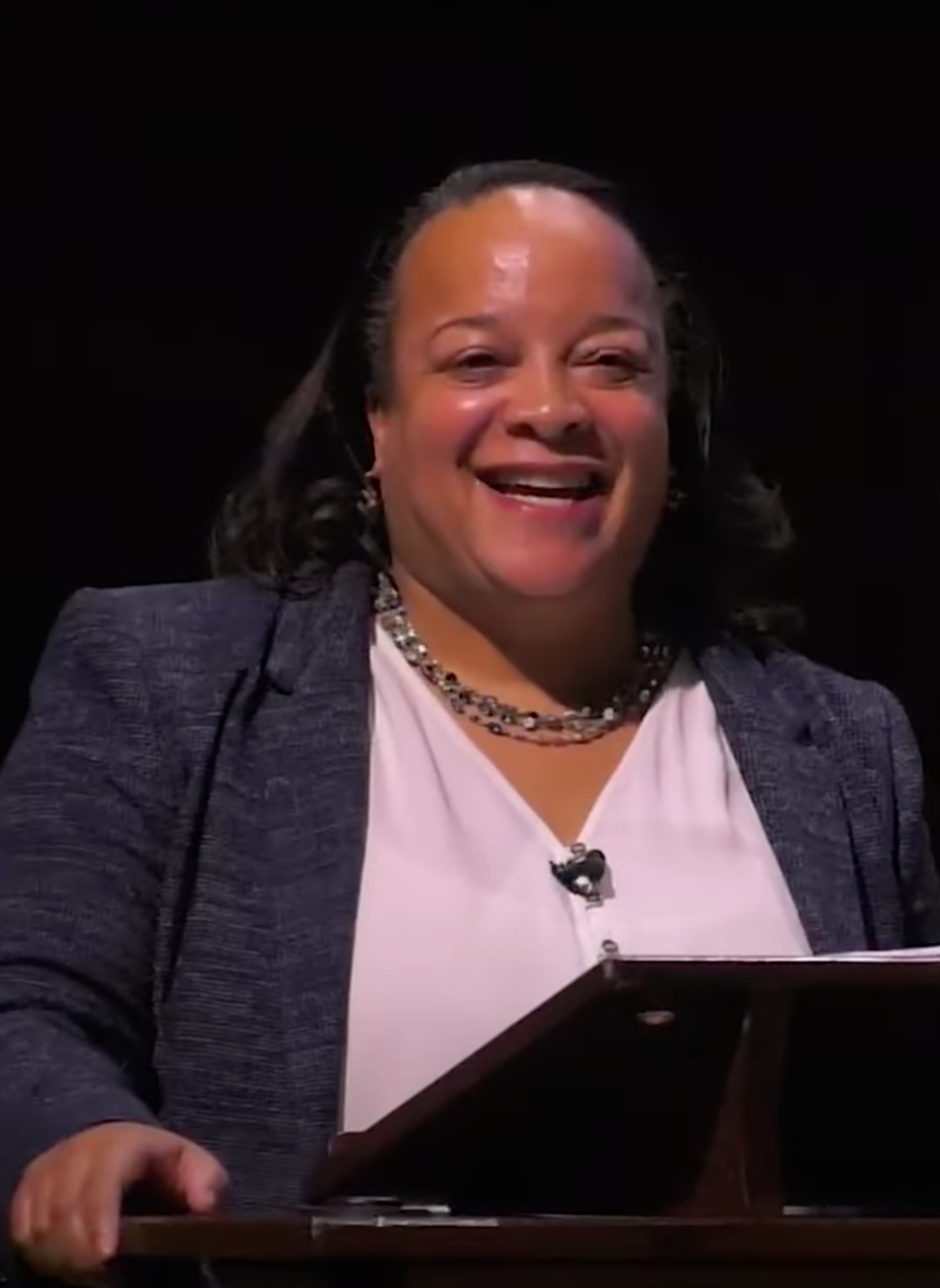
- Long in 2023
- Born: July 18, 1973 (age 53); Baltimore, Maryland, U.S.
- Education: Princeton University (BA); Harvard University (PhD)
- Scientific career
- Fields: Economics
- Workplaces: Harvard Graduate School of Education
- Doctoral advisor: Caroline M. Hoxby, Lawrence F. Katz, and Claudia Goldin
- Website: http://www.bridgetterrylong.com

Bridget Terry Long (born July 18, 1973) is an American economist and academic administrator who is the 12th Dean of the Harvard Graduate School of Education and the Saris Professor of Education and Economics at Harvard University. She is an economist whose research focuses on college access and success. Long is a Faculty Research Associate at the National Bureau of Economic Research and a member of the National Academy of Education.

== Biography ==
Long was born in Baltimore, Maryland, in 1973. She spent most of her childhood in Columbus, Ohio, but attended and completed high school in Naperville, Illinois, at Naperville North High School. She earned her A.B. in Economics with a Certificate in Afro-American Studies from Princeton University and her Ph.D. in economics from Harvard University. She began teaching at Harvard in 2000. She was Faculty Director of the Ed.D. and Ph.D. programs from 2010 to 2013 and Academic Dean from 2013 to 2017. She was appointed Dean on July 1, 2018.

== Research ==
Long's research focuses on the economics of education with particular attention on the transition from high school to higher education and beyond. She has examined factors that influence student enrollment decisions, choice, and persistence in post-secondary education. Much of her work investigates the impact of education policies and programs, and several projects apply insights from behavioral economics to education.

Long has conducted several large, randomized controlled trials to establish the causal effects of interventions designed to better support students. Working with co-authors, she conducted a major study on the impact of information and assistance on completing financial aid forms (i.e. the FAFSA). The study contributed to quantitative evidence on the detrimental effects complex processes can have on educational attainment, and it has been cited in efforts to simplify the federal financial aid application. Long followed this work with studies on the effectiveness of interventions that focus on helping families save for higher education and students persist in college. She has also written about how the government and institutions could help students to make better educational decisions by providing clear, easy-to-access information.

Long has also used of state administrative data to explore long-standing questions in higher education, and she produced some of the earliest large-scale studies on the causal effects of post-secondary remediation, different types of instructors, and class size on college student outcomes. Additionally, several of her papers explore the supply side of higher education by studying the reactions of colleges and universities to changes in policy.

Long has won numerous research grants to support her research, including major awards from the Bill & Melinda Gates Foundation, the U.S. Department of Education, and the National Science Foundation (NSF). She has been a project member of two federally-funded research centers: the National Center of Postsecondary Research (2006–2012) and the Center for Analysis of Postsecondary Education and Employment (2011–2016). She was selected to be a Fellow of the International Academy of Education and is also a past recipient of the National Academy of Education/Spencer Postdoctoral Fellowship. The National Association of Student Financial Aid Administrators (NASFAA) awarded Long the Robert P. Huff Golden Quill Award for excellence in research and published works on student financial assistance.

Long was honored in 2021 with a Spencer Mentor award for her contributions towards bolstering career opportunities for those pursuing work in education research.

== Advisory positions ==
Long was appointed by President Obama to the National Board for Education Sciences (NBES), which is the advisory panel of the Institute of Education Sciences (IES) at the U.S. Department of Education. She served as chair during her appointment. She has also testified multiple times before Federal Congressional Committees. Long serves of the board of MDRC and the Society for Research on Educational Effectiveness. She has served as an adviser to the American Council on Education, Bill & Melinda Gates Foundation, College Board, I Have A Dream Foundation, Massachusetts Board of Higher Education, and the Ohio Board of Regents.

== Selected works ==
- Castleman, Benjamin and Bridget Terry Long. (2016) “Looking Beyond Enrollment: The Causal Effect of Need-Based Grants on College Access, Persistence, and Graduationʺ. Journal of Labor Economics, 34(4), 1023-1073. doi:10.1086/686643
- Bettinger, Eric, Angela Boatman, and Bridget Terry Long. (2013) “Student Supports: Developmental Education and Other Academic Programs”. Cecilia Rouse, Lisa Barrow, and Thomas Brock (eds.). Future of Children: Postsecondary Education in the U.S., 23(1), Spring. doi:10.1353/foc.2013.0003.
- Bettinger, Eric P.; Long, Bridget Terry; Oreopoulos, Philip; Sanbonmatsu, Lisa (2012). "The role of application assistance and information in college decisions: Results from the H&R Block FAFSA experiment" (PDF). The Quarterly Journal of Economics. 127 (3): 1205–1242. doi:10.1093/qje/qjs017.
- Bettinger, Eric and Bridget Terry Long. (2010) “Does Cheaper Mean Better? The Impact of using Adjunct Instructors on Student Outcomes”. Review of Economics and Statistics 92(3): 598–613. doi:10.1162/rest_a_00014.
- Bettinger, Eric P.; Long, Bridget Terry (2009). "Addressing the needs of underprepared students in higher education does college remediation work?" (PDF). Journal of Human Resources. 44 (3): 736–771. doi:10.1353/jhr.2009.0033. JSTOR 20648915. S2CID 107912655.
- Calcagno, Juan Carlos; Long, Bridget Terry (2008). "The impact of postsecondary remediation using a regression discontinuity approach: Addressing endogenous sorting and noncompliance" (PDF). National Bureau of Economic Research (w14194).
- Long, Bridget Terry; Kurlaender, Michal (2009). "Do community colleges provide a viable pathway to a baccalaureate degree?" (PDF). Educational Evaluation and Policy Analysis. 31 (1): 30–53. doi:10.3102/0162373708327756. JSTOR 25478683. S2CID 142281793.
- Long, Bridget Terry (2004), "How Have College Decisions Changed Overtime? An Application of the Conditional Logistic Choice Model". Journal of Econometrics, vol. 121, no. 1–2: pp. 271–296. doi:10.1016/j.jeconom.2003.10.004.
- Long, Bridget Terry. (2004), "How do Financial Aid Policies affect Colleges? The Institutional Impact of the Georgia HOPE Scholarship". Journal of Human Resources, vol. 39, no. 3. doi:10.2307/3559038.
