= Catherine Mandeville Snow =

Last women hanged in Newfoundland (1793–1834)

- Born: Catherine Mandeville c. 1793; Harbour Grace, Newfoundland Colony
- Died: July 21, 1834 (aged 40–41); St. John's, Newfoundland Colony
- Cause of death: Execution by hanging
- Known for: Last woman executed in Newfoundland
- Spouse: John Snow (m. 1816–1833)
- Children: 8, including Richard
- Criminal charges: Murder of her husband

Catherine Mandeville Snow (c. 1793 – July 21, 1834) was the last woman who was executed in Newfoundland. Originally from Harbour Grace, Snow lived in Salmon Cove near Port de Grave with her abusive husband John Snow and their seven children. When John Snow disappeared on August 31, 1833, the prime suspect, servant Arthur Spring, implicated Catherine Snow with planning his murder. She was tried alongside Spring and her cousin Tobias Mandeville on January 10, 1834 at the Supreme Court of Newfoundland in St. John's.

Although the evidence against Catherine Snow was largely circumstantial, the jury declared all three of the accused guilty, and Chief Justice Henry Boulton sentenced them all to death by hanging. However, Snow was pregnant, and her execution was delayed so that she could give birth and raise her newborn son Richard Snow from her jail cell. Snow's sentence was carried out in St. John's a few months after Richard's birth. Her trial and story have inspired many artistic works. The Newfoundland and Labrador Historical Society organized a posthumous re-trial at the Supreme Court in 2012 where a jury found her to be innocent.

== Early life and murder of John Snow ==
Born between 1791 and 1793 in Harbour Grace, Conception Bay, Snow as a young woman moved to Salmon Cove near Port de Grave. Snow lived common law and then married an abusive planter, John William Snow, in Port de Grave. Together they had seven children, and married on October 30, 1828. Their marriage was unhappy, and there were frequent fights. According to reports, Catherine would fight back and throw things at him.

On the night of August 31, 1833, John Snow disappeared, and neighbours wondered quietly and then loudly if he had been murdered. Magistrate Robert Pinsent launched an investigation, and the general suspicion was confirmed when dried blood was discovered on John Snow's fishing stage. On September 12, it was noted in the newspaper The Newfoundlander,

A most atrocious and unnatural murder has lately been perpetrated at Port-de-Grave, in Conception Bay. Mr. JOHN SNOW, a respectable planter of that place, having suddenly and mysteriously disappeared enquiry was set on foot, and from certain suspicious circumstances, a servant of SNOW'S named ARTHUR SPRING, and another man of the name of MANDEVILLE, were arrested, but there not being sufficient evidence to criminate them, they were, we understand, released on bail. We learn, however that on Saturday last, SPRING made a voluntary confession, in which he stated that his master had actually been murdered, at the instigation of his own wife, that he had been shot by MANDEVILLE in his (SPRING'S) presence; and that after the deed was accomplished they had attached the body to a grapnel and thrown it into the sea. MANDEVILLE, we understand, on being arrested and examined, admitted part of SPRING'S evidence, but denied having been the actual perpetrator of the crime – alleging that SPRING was the principal. MANDEVILLE and SPRING were brought to this town, and committed to Gaol on Sunday evening. The woman had previously quitted Port-de-Grave, but although an active search has been made for her, she had not, at the time of writing this article, been discovered. SNOW and his wife were the parents of a large family, and had been married about 17 years. The two prisoners underwent a long examination yesterday – the particulars of which have not transpired; but we understand it to have been similar to the former examinations.

Catherine and her first cousin Tobias Mandeville were implicated in the murder, along with Arthur Spring, one of Snow's indentured servants. Catherine ran away to the woods, but eventually turned herself in to the courthouse at Harbour Grace. According to the confession, John Snow was shot while going from his boat to the stagehead, but his body was never found.

== Murder trial ==
The trial took place at St. John's on January 10, 1834, and despite their confessions, all had pleaded not guilty. The Chief Justice was Henry Boulton, and the jury members were Thomas Buckham, John Lang, Thomas Edstrom, George Lewis, Patrick Byrne, William Buckley, James Tubrid, Patrick Maher, Richard Trelegan, Robert Radford, Valentine Merchant, and Andrew Stewart.

Snow and Mandeville were represented by George Henry Emerson, while Spring's lawyer was Bryan Robinson. The attorney general told the all-male jury, "I can't prove which one fired the shot, both were present for the murder. As to Catherine Snow, there is no direct or positive evidence of her guilt. But I have a chain of circumstantial evidence to prove her guilty." The Royal Gazette reported:

On Friday the 10th, Tobias Mandeville, Arthur Spring, and Catherine Snow, were put to the Bar, on their trial for the wilful murder of John Snow, a respectable planter of Port-de-Grave – the husband of the prisoner Catherine Snow, and the master of the prisoner Spring. – This trial excited the most painful interest, – and occupied the attention of the Court for upwards of twelve hours; – when the Jury brought in a verdict of "Guilty" against all the Prisoners; and after a most eloquent and affecting address from the Chief Judge, sentence of Death was passed on them by his Lordship – to be carried into effect on the following Monday (yesterday). Tobias Mandeville, being found Guilty of Murder, was sentenced to be hung by the neck until dead; and his body to be dissected and anatomized: – Arthur Spring, the servant, and Catherine Snow, the wife, of the deceased, were declared Guilty of Petit-Treason, and accordingly sentenced to be drawn to the place of execution on a hurdle, – and their bodies, after death, also to be given to the surgeons for dissection.

During their trial, Snow claimed to be pregnant with her eighth child. Following this, "the Court ordered that a Jury of Twelve respectable Matrons should be Empaneled to decide on the truth or falsity of the Prisoner’s allegation; a Jury of that description accordingly met on Saturday morning, and returned a verdict (in substance) that the Prisoner was in the situation stated in her plea."

== Execution ==
On January 13, 1834, both Arthur Spring and Tobias Mandeville were hanged. Instead of being dissected, their bodies were ordered to be taken to Port de Grave, and from there to be displayed in a gibbet at Spectacle Head, near Cupids. This did not happen, in part due to the "interference" of Roman Catholic priests, and in March, a funeral for both was held in Harbour Grace, preceded by a mock execution held over the corpses.

Many in Newfoundland were determined that Snow not meet the same fate. Bishop Michael Fleming made Snow a cause célèbre. The governor, Thomas John Cochrane delayed her hanging until the baby was born. She gave birth to the child, baptized Richard Snow, and nursed him for three months in her prison cell.

On July 21, 1834, at 8:45 am, as crowds gathered on Duckworth Street, Snow walked out on the platform. Three priests, Fathers Troy, Ward and Waldron, attended her on the scaffold. According to the Public Ledger, "The unhappy woman, after a few brief struggles, passed into another world." The Newfoundland Patriot reported that Snow had insisted on her innocence to the end:

She died declaring she was a wretched sinful woman, but as innocent of any participation in the crime for which she was about to suffer as the child unborn, and that she had not even the most distant presentiment, at any time, that her husband would have fallen under the hand of an assassin.

After her death, Bishop Fleming took over guardianship of her children. The eldest three of Snow's children signed a petition calling for the dismissal of Judge Bolton for his handling of the case.

== Legacy and popular culture ==
The story of Catherine Snow has inspired two novels by Nellie P. Strowbridge, "Catherine Snow" and "The Hanged Woman’s Daughter;" the play "What Hangs in the Balance" by Petrina Bromley; the song "The Nameless Murderess" co-written by Jody Richardson and the Newfoundland folk trio The Once, the short story "Catherine Snow" and the short two-hander play "Catherine Snow: a duologue" both by Grace Butt, the play "Offensive to Some" by Bernadine Stapleton, an episode of the TV show Lore, and an episode of the podcast Tales, Tunes, and Toutons.

On April 1, 2012, a re-staging of Snow's trial was held in St. John's. It was organized by the Newfoundland and Labrador Historical Society, with Supreme Court justices Seamus O'Regan and Carl Thompson, with defence lawyer Rosellen Sullivan. Approximately 400 local residents attended. Snow's modern-day defence lawyer argued, "the evidence of the affair is so prejudicial, it's impossible to extricate it from the statements ... there's no way she could have a fair trial." After hearing the evidence, the modern jury acquitted her.

Snow's great-great-granddaughter is former CNN news anchor Mary Snow.

== See also ==
- Herbert Spratt, last person executed in Newfoundland
