= Alice S. Carter =

American clinical psychologist

- Education: Cornell University; University of Houston
- Scientific career
- Fields: Clinical psychology
- Workplaces: Yale University; University of Massachusetts Boston

Alice S. Carter is an American clinical psychologist and professor known for her research in the early identification of psychopathology and neurodevelopmental disorders in young children. She is a distinguished professor of psychology at the University of Massachusetts Boston, where she previously served as the director of the graduate program in clinical psychology.

== Education ==
Carter received her B.S. degree from Cornell University, where she majored in human development and family studies. She earned her Ph.D. in clinical psychology from the University of Houston. Following her doctoral studies, she completed a pre-doctoral clinical internship and a post-doctoral fellowship at the Yale Child Study Center.

== Career ==
Carter was an associate professor of psychology at Yale University. She is now a Distinguished Professor in the psychology department at the University of Massachusetts Boston, where she previously served as the director of the graduate program in clinical psychology. Carter also holds concurrent appointments as an associate research scientist at the Yale Child Study Center and a research associate in the Boston University School of Medicine's Department of Anatomy and Neurobiology.

Carter’s work is focused on the development of young children within the context of family relationships, emphasizing the early identification of psychopathology and factors that place children at risk. Her research seeks to improve the early detection, evaluation, and treatment of infants and toddlers with social-emotional problems, including anxiety and autism spectrum disorders (ASD). She also evaluates interventions that reduce parenting stress and enhance child competencies, and studies the reciprocal relations between child development and family functioning. She has received continuous funding from the National Institute of Mental Health to study early-emerging psychopathology and from Autism Speaks for a trial of a parent-mediated intervention for toddlers with ASD. Carter also contributes to research on young children with ASD as part of the Boston University Studies To Advance Autism Research (STAART).

A former fellow of Zero to Three, Carter has authored or co-authored over 200 articles and chapters. She co-edited the Handbook of Infant, Toddler, and Preschool Mental Health Assessment and two assessments, the Infant-Toddler Social and Emotional Assessment (ITSEA) and the Brief Infant-Toddler Social and Emotional Assessment (BITSEA). Carter has conducted trainings on infant mental health and early detection of ASD.
