= Children of the Dust =

Children of the Dust may refer to:

- Children of the Dust (novel), a 1985 novel by Louise Lawrence
- Children of the Dust, a 1995 novel by Clancy Carlile
- Children of the Dust (miniseries), a 1995 U.S. TV miniseries
- Children of Dust, a 1923 film directed by Frank Borzage
