= Robert A. Nye =

American historian

- Education: San Jose State University, University of Wisconsin–Madison
- Employer(s): University of Oklahoma, Oregon State University
- Spouse: Mary Jo Nye

Robert A. Nye is Horning Professor of the Humanities and Professor of History at Oregon State University. He specializes in European intellectual history and the history of sexuality, and the history of social sciences, medicine and society, particularly in France and Western Europe.

Nye studied history at San Jose State University and the University of Wisconsin. He taught at the University of Oklahoma for 25 years, becoming a research professor in 1992. In 1994 he moved to Oregon State University. He was on the editorial board of the American Historical Review from 2003 to 2006.

== Books ==
- The Origins of Crowd Psychology: Gustave LeBon and the Crisis of Mass Democracy in the Third Republic (1975)
- The Anti-Democratic Origins of Elite Theory: Pareto, Mosca, Michels (1977)
- Crime, Madness, and Politics in Modern France (1984)
- Masculinity and Male Codes of Honor in Modern France (1993)
- Sexuality: Oxford Readers (1999, editor)
