= Graeme Clifford =

Australian film director

- Born: 27 September 1942 (age 82); Sydney, New South Wales, Australia
- Occupation(s): Film director, film editor

Graeme Clifford (born 27 September 1942) is an Australian film director. His directing credits include the Academy Award-nominated film Frances, Gleaming the Cube and the mini-series The Last Don, which received two Emmy nominations.

Clifford was a leading film editor for over ten years, before he made an impressive feature directorial debut with Frances, the dramatic real-life story of actress Frances Farmer, which gained Academy Award nominations for Jessica Lange and Kim Stanley and was also entered into the 13th Moscow International Film Festival. His second feature outing was the Australian historical adventure-drama Burke & Wills which was chosen as a participant in the 1986 Cannes Film Festival. He followed up with the contemporary action-suspense drama Gleaming the Cube, starring Christian Slater, and Deception (a.k.a. Ruby Cairo), starring Andie MacDowell, Liam Neeson and Viggo Mortensen.

== Career ==
Born in Sydney, Australia, Clifford obtained his wide-ranging experience in editing, special effects, sound recording/mixing, animation and assistant directing at Artransa Park, Sydney's only film studio for many years. In 1964 he moved to London and worked at the BBC in their editing department. He then moved to Canada where he worked for CBD as an editor making commercials and documentaries in Vancouver. While there he met Robert Altman and got a job assisting editing on That Cold Day in the Park. Altman liked the work he did and invited Clifford to Los Angeles.

Clifford's collaborations with Altman include M*A*S*H, McCabe and Mrs. Miller, Images and The Long Goodbye. For Roeg, Clifford edited Don't Look Now, for which he was nominated for a British Academy Award, as well as The Man Who Fell to Earth.

Clifford's other feature editing credits include Norman Jewison's F.I.S.T., Sam Peckinpah's Convoy, Bob Rafelson's The Postman Always Rings Twice and the cult-classic The Rocky Horror Picture Show.

Clifford's television directorial credits are many and varied. They include episodes of Joan of Arcadia, The Guardian, Twin Peaks and Faerie Tale Theatre, and the movies Profoundly Normal (Kirstie Alley, Delroy Lindo), See You In My Dreams (Aidan Quinn, Marcia Gay Harden), Redeemer (Matthew Modine), Past Tense (Scott Glenn, Lara Flynn Boyle, Anthony LaPaglia) and Mario Puzo's The Last Don Parts I and II, an Emmy-nominated 10-hour mini-series (Danny Aiello, Joe Mantegna, Jason Gedrick, Daryl Hannah).

== Filmography ==
As director:

Feature films

- Frances
- Burke & Wills
- Gleaming the Cube
- Ruby Cairo

Television films

- Write & Wrong
- Family Sins
- Profoundly Normal
- Crossing the Line
- Gaily, Gaily
- Redeemer
- See You In My Dreams
- The Last Witness
- The Last Don II
- My Husband's Secret Life
- The Last Don
- A Loss of Innocence
- Nightmare Classics ("The Turn of the Screw")
