= Mosca (surname) =

Mosca is an Italian surname. Notable people with the surname include:

- Alessia Mosca (born 1975), Italian politician
- Angelo Mosca (1937–2021), Canadian Football League player and professional wrestler
- Antonio Mosca (1870–1951), Italian painter
- Bianca Mosca (dead 1950), London-based fashion designer
- Claudio Mosca (born 1991), Argentine footballer
- Enrique Mosca (1880-1950), Argentine lawyer and politician
- Frank Mosca (born 1976), American film producer
- Gaetano Mosca (1858–1941), Italian political scientist, journalist, and public servant
- Giuseppe Mosca (1772–1839), Italian opera composer
- Jacopo Mosca (born 1993), Italian cyclist
- John Mosca (restaurateur) (1922–2011), American restauranteur, founder of Mosca's
- John Mosca (musician) (born 1950), American jazz trombonist
- Lino Mosca (1907−1992), Italian professional football player
- Luigi Mosca (1775–1824), Italian composer of operas and sacred music, and singing teacher
- Maurizio Mosca (1940–2010), Italian sports journalist and television presenter
- Michele Mosca, Italian physics researcher and professor of mathematics
- Paolo Mosca (1943–2014), Italian journalist, writer, singer, and television presenter
- Pierre Mosca (born 1949), Italian-born French former footballer and coach
- Rafael Mosca (born 1982), Brazilian swimmer
- Rich Mosca (born c. 1948), former American football player and coach
- Sal Mosca (1927–2007), American jazz pianist
- Simone Mosca (1492–1554), Italian sculptor
- Stefania Mosca (1957–2009), Venezuelan writer
- Tommaso Mosca (born 2000), Italian racing driver

== Fictional characters ==
- Mosca, of Ben Jonson's 1606 play Volpone
- Mosca, of The Godfather Part III
- Frank Mosca, of Miami Vice
- Gola Mosca, of Reborn! manga and anime series
- Walter Mosca, of Mario Puzo's novel The Dark Arena
