= Omertà (novel) =

2000 posthumous novel by Mario Puzo

- U.S. first edition cover
- Author: Mario Puzo
- Language: English
- Genre: Thriller, crime
- Publisher: Random House
- Publication date: 2000
- Publication place: United States
- Media type: Print (hardcover and paperback)
- Pages: 321 pp.
- ISBN: 0-375-50568-7
- OCLC: 00028082
- Dewey Decimal: 813/.54 21
- LC Class: PS3566.U9 O46 2000b
- Preceded by: The Last Don

Omertà is a novel by Mario Puzo, published posthumously in 2000. It was first published by Ballantine Books. Omertà follows the story of Don Aprile's adopted "nephew" Astorre Viola.

== Publication ==
Puzo never saw the publication of Omertà, but the manuscript was finished before his death in 1999. In a review originally published in the San Francisco Chronicle, Jules Siegel, who had worked closely with Puzo at Magazine Management Company, speculated that Omertà may have been completed by "some talentless hack." Siegel also acknowledges the temptation to "rationalize avoiding what is probably the correct analysis – that [Puzo] wrote it and it is terrible.

== Plot summary ==
The book begins with the death of Don Vincenzo Zeno in Sicily. On his deathbed, Don Zeno left the care of his infant son Astorre to his old follower, Don Raymonde Aprile. Don Aprile lives in New York, where he is known as a fair but merciless Mafia head. He is a widower who does not want his children to follow him in illicit business. To save them, he sends them to private boarding schools and only sees them on holidays. Astorre is the Don's favorite ward, considering him his nephew, and the young lad is picked as the one who must protect the family after Aprile dies.

Aprile decides to take Astorre, now a young and bright child, to Sicily one summer. While the Don and Astorre are walking the streets of Sicily, a small cosca kidnaps them. The captors treat the Don and Astorre well, but they want a ransom. Aprile warns the kidnappers to let them go. "The rest of your lives will be miserable if you do not." The cosca does not realize how powerful Aprile is. In the middle of the night, Bianco, a friend of the Don, rescues Aprile and Astorre. Aprile wants to kill the kidnappers, but Astorre asks him not to. Aprile gives in, but makes the men his loyal servants.

When Astorre turns 16, he has a romance with Nicole, the Don's youngest child and only daughter. Aprile orders the boy to move to London, to attend college and stop the affair. Nicole is upset by this, but Astorre obeys his uncle without argument. Astorre stays in London for a year with Mr. Pryor, a banker friend of the Don, and then returns to Sicily, staying for ten years and serving under Don Bianco, fellow Don Zeno follower, and protector of Aprile. During his time in London, he meets a young woman named Rosie, with whom he begins a romantic relationship, which he continues during his time in Sicily, until he finds out that she has not been faithful to him.

When Astorre comes back, having completed his training, Aprile decides it is time to retire from his dangerous business. He settles all his accounts and pays off all of his associates keeping only his ten international banks, which are completely legitimate. Aprile instructs Astorre that when he dies the banks should not be sold. Aprile writes in his will that Astorre owns 51% of all voting stock in the bank, with the Don's children owning the rest. The interests from the bank will go to Astorre and the children evenly. In the meanwhile, Aprile starts a macaroni importing business for Astorre.

Valerius, Aprile's oldest son, invites his family to his son's communion. After the communion commences two men execute Aprile in a drive-by shooting. Without any public authorities securing the area, the killers are able to escape and, in spite of Aprile's power, there is no subsequent investigation into his death. Timmona Portella, controlling the only significant criminal organization remaining in New York, along with his international partners, tries to negotiate with the Don's children and Astorre to purchase the banks from them in order to launder drug money. However, Astorre, holding the majority share, consistently declines their offers, following the Don's instructions and claiming that he has found a love for the banking industry.

At first, Aprile's children want to be as removed as possible and want to sell the banks thinking Astorre naive and innocent due to his good-natured and friendly demeanor, and while baffled that their father left him the majority share, want to protect him. As time passes, though, they come to see that their father had meant for his banks to secure their futures in their respective careers, and that they had done so thus far, with Valerius a high-ranking military officer, Marcantonio a prolific TV producer, and Nicole a successful lawyer in a prominent law firm. They also start to see that there is more to their "cousin" than they thought, and begin to suspect the reason why Aprile left him in charge.

Drawing upon his years of training, Astorre methodically seeks each of the people responsible for the death of his uncle and had been trying to get control of his banks, consulting old friends of Aprile for advice. At times during these consultations, the friends suggest selling the banks to avoid all the trouble that Astorre is going through even to stay alive, but are impressed when he politely rejects the idea, seeing in him determination and strength that they themselves lacked. Astorre finds each of the people involved in Aprile's murder, from the hitmen to those who ordered the attack, and is able to eliminate them without detection by the authorities.

Two years later, Nicole has taken over as general manager of the banks, and her brothers are working on a film for TV recounting the life of their father, with Astorre as a consultant to help them with some of the details. Astorre eventually decides to move to Sicily permanently, and there marries Rosie. They have their first child, whom they name Raymonde Zeno, after Astorre's two fathers, and they consider the day that they will bring their son back to America.

== Reception ==
The novel received varying reviews. In Time magazine, R.Z. Sheppard said "This posthumously published novel by the author of The Godfather has more tasty twists than a plate of fusilli", and "this deft and passionate last novel by the Balzac of the Mafia", while Michiko Kakutani wrote in The New York Times "Fact is, the more I think about it, the more this book gives me agita. God forbid that I should criticize the author of the great GF, but I gotta be honest with you: the man has lost his touch."

== Planned adaptation ==
Before the novel was published, Miramax bid for adaptation rights from Puzo's estate. Bert Fields negotiated the deal, which was rumored to be worth $3 million. Alan Sereboff was offered a three-pic deal to adapt the book, with a potential miniseries for CBS.

Several years later, the rights to the novel were carried over to The Weinstein Company when the Weinsteins left Miramax, and a new television adaptation was announced with Sylvester Stallone cast in the lead role and Antoine Fuqua set to direct.
