= The Fortunate Pilgrim (miniseries) =

- Based on: The Fortunate Pilgrim by Mario Puzo
- Screenplay by: John McGreevey
- Story by: Mario Puzo
- Directed by: Stuart Cooper
- Starring: Sophia Loren; Edward James Olmos; John Turturro
- Composers: Lucio Dalla; Mauro Malavasi
- Original language: English
- No. of seasons: 1
- No. of episodes: 2

Production
- Cinematography: Reginald H. Morris; Ned Vidakovich

Original release
- Release: 3 April – 4 April 1988

The Fortunate Pilgrim (Italian: Mamma Lucia) is a 1988 American-Italian television drama miniseries written and directed by Stuart Cooper. It is based on the Mario Puzo's novel with the same name.

== Cast ==
- Sophia Loren as Lucia
- Edward James Olmos as Frank Corbo
- John Turturro as Larry
- Anna Strasberg as Filomena
- Yorgo Voyagis as Tony
- Mirjana Karanović as Clara
- Annabella Sciorra as Octavia
- Ron Marquette as Vinnie
- Hal Holbrook as Dr. Andrew McKay
- Harold Pruett as Gino
- Ljiljana Blagojević as Rosa
- Dianne Daniels as Harriett
- Pepe Serna as John Colucci
- Helen Stirling as Aunt Louchi
- Roxann Dawson as Louisa
- Bernard Kay as Pugnale
- Frano Lasić as Dr. Laschen
- Stuart Milligan as Lefty Fay
- Shane Rimmer as Reilly
