= Sweet Temptation =

Sweet Temptation may refer to:

- Sweet Temptation (film)
- "Sweet Temptation", a song by Jewel from the album 0304
- "Sweet Temptation (Hollow)", a song by Lillix from the album Inside the Hollow
