= The Fourth K =

Novel by Mario Puzo

- U.S. first edition cover
- Author: Mario Puzo
- Language: English
- Publisher: Random House
- Publication date: 1990
- Publication place: United States
- Media type: Print (hardback and paperback)
- Pages: 479 pp.
- ISBN: 0-394-56996-2
- OCLC: 23286701
- Dewey Decimal: 813/.54 20
- LC Class: PS3566.U9 F68 1990
- Preceded by: The Sicilian
- Followed by: The Last Don

The Fourth K is a novel by Mario Puzo, published in 1990. It is set during the presidency of fictional "Francis Xavier Kennedy," nephew of John F., Robert F. and Ted Kennedy.

== Plot summary ==
The novel begins with a world-weary President who has decided not to run for a second term in office, as his personal agenda has been picked apart by the United States Congress, lobbyists and the ominous The Socrates Group, made up of the richest and most influential men in America.

The assassination of the Pope and the kidnap and subsequent murder of Kennedy's daughter on Easter Sunday, and the discovery of a nuclear device in the heart of Manhattan have shocked the administration into action, and suddenly Francis Kennedy finds himself isolated by his opponents, who question his capacity to act under the 25th Amendment.

Once the crisis has passed, the President vows to change the face of American politics forever, proposing a radical left-wing economic agenda but with very right-wing methods of governance. The novel details Kennedy’s re-election campaign and his fight for his vision of the future.

== Background ==
Mario Puzo has stated: "The Fourth K was a [commercial] failure—but it was my most ambitious book."

== See also ==
- Kennedy family
