= The Fortunate Pilgrim =

Novel by Mario Puzo

- First edition
- Author: Mario Puzo
- Language: English
- Publication date: 1965
- Publication place: United States
- Media type: Print (hardback & paperback) & Audiobook
- Pages: 544 pp (Paperback edition)
- ISBN: 0-449-00358-2 (Paperback editions)
- OCLC: 39560711
- Preceded by: The Dark Arena
- Followed by: The Runaway Summer of Davie Shaw

The Fortunate Pilgrim is a 1965 novel by American author Mario Puzo.

Mario Puzo considered the novel his finest, most poetic, and literary work. In one of his last interviews he stated that he was saddened by the fact that The Godfather, a fiction he never liked, outshone the novel based on his mother's honest immigrant struggle for respectability in America and her courage and filial love.

Puzo said that the book's hero, Lucia Santa, is based on his own mother: "Whenever the Godfather opened his mouth, in my own mind I heard the voice of my mother. I heard her wisdom, her ruthlessness, and her unconquerable love for her family and for life itself. … The Don's courage and loyalty came from her; his humanity came from her… and so, I know now, without Lucia Santa, I could not have written The Godfather."

== Plot ==
The novel tells the story of the Angeluzzi-Corbos family, a family of immigrants living an adopted life in New York City. The head of the family is Lucia Santa, a wife, widow and mother of two families. It is her formidable will that steers them through the Great Depression and the early years of World War II. But she cannot prevent the conflict between Italian and American values.

== Miniseries ==
in 1988, the novel was turned into a miniseries with Sophia Loren in the lead role.
