= Emily Ann Lloyd =

American actress

- Born: Emily Ann Morelli; March 27, 1984 (age 41); Glendale, California, U.S.
- Occupation: Actress
- Years active: 1990–1999

Emily Ann Lloyd (born Emily Ann Morelli; March 27, 1984) is a retired American actress. She is best known for her role as Susan Lovell, the daughter of Jim Lovell, in Apollo 13.

== Life and career ==
Lloyd was born in Glendale, California, the daughter of Melissa (née Rogers) and David Morelli. and the older sister of actor Eric Lloyd.

She made her debut in 1990 in the Arnold Schwarzenegger film Kindergarten Cop. For that role she won the Young Artist Award in 1991. After that she played the role of Elizabeth 'Betsy' Gibson Ewing in the television series Knots Landing. In 1997 she reprised her role as a teenager in the miniseries Knots Landing: Back to the Cul-de-Sac.

== Filmography ==
Film
Year	Title	Role	Notes
1990	Kindergarten Cop	Jennifer	
1995	Apollo 13	Susan Lovell	
1995	Home for the Holidays	Brittany Lace Wedman	
1999	Miss Supreme Queen	Kelly Bell	Short film

Television
Year	Title	Role	Notes
1990-1993	Knots Landing	Betsy Ewing	Recurring role (41 episodes)
1991	My Life and Times	Child Melanie Miller	Episode: "Millennium"; Episode: "The Collapse of '98"
1991	Princesses	Angela	Episode: "Her Highness for Hire"
1991	Anything but Love		Episode: "A Tale of Two Kiddies"
1993	Tainted Blood	Katie	TV film
1993	Lois & Clark: The New Adventures of Superman	Inez	Episode: "Smart Kids"
1993	A Walton Thanksgiving Reunion	Katie	TV film
1995	Annie: A Royal Adventure!	Hannah	TV film
1996-1998	Something So Right	Sarah Kramer	Main role (37 episodes)
1997	Early Edition	Rachel Greenburg	Episode: "Faith"
1997	Knots Landing: Back to the Cul-de-Sac	Betsy Ewing	Episode: "Reunion '96"
