= Shadows of Desire =

- Genre: Drama; Thriller
- Written by: Joyce Eliason
- Directed by: Sam Pillsbury
- Starring: Nicollette Sheridan; Joe Lando; Adrian Pasdar
- Theme music composer: Mark Snow
- Country of origin: United States
- Original language: English

Production
- Executive producers: Frank Konigsberg; Joyce Eliason
- Producer: Hans Proppe
- Production locations: Austin, Texas; Elgin, Texas
- Cinematography: James Bartle
- Editor: Tod Feuerman
- Running time: 96 minutes
- Production company: The Königsberg Company

Original release
- Network: CBS
- Release: September 20, 1994

Shadows of Desire is a 1994 television film starring Nicollette Sheridan, Joe Lando, Adrian Pasdar, Richard Roundtree, Piper Laurie and Brandon Smith. It was directed by Sam Pillsbury and written by Joyce Eliason. The film score was composed by Mark Snow.
