= Melvyn Usselman =

Melvyn Charles Usselman (1944–2015) was a professor of chemistry at the University of Western Ontario (UWO), with a particular focus on the history of chemistry.

== Life and career ==
He studied for his BSc, MA and PhD at UWO. He married Trixie Sennema. They had four children, Jasper, Charlotte, Richard and David.

He spent over 30 years researching eighteenth and nineteenth-century chemistry to write a biography of the English polymath and discoverer of the elements palladium and rhodium, William Hyde Wollaston, entitled Pure Intelligence: The Life of William Hyde Wollaston. In doing this as a professional chemist and a dedicated biographer, Usselman attempted to reproduce Wollaston's experiments from the original notes, even going so far as to assay the actual samples that Wollaston had produced which were held by Michael Faraday.

In a similar vein, earlier publications and experiments of his concern the work of other chemists in their golden age of discovery, including the Frenchmen Jacques Étienne Bérard and Claude Louis Berthollet, the Englishmen John Dalton, Thomas Thomson and Smithson Tennant, and the German Justus von Liebig.

In 1994-5 he won the Edward G.Pleva Award for Excellence in Teaching. In 1996 he won an Ontario Confederation of University Faculty Association (OCUFA) Teaching and Academic Librarianship Award. He received the de:Liebig-Wöhler-Freundschaftspreis in 2003 for his chemical history research. He was awarded a 2004-5 University Students' Council (USC) Teaching Excellence Award and the USC President's Medal for Innovation in Undergraduate Teaching in 2005. He was on the USC Honour Roll five years running from 1997 to 1998.

He won a posthumous award in 2016, the Roy G. Neville Prize in Bibliography or Biography for his biography of Wollaston.

He died at Strathroy, Ontario on 23 March 2015 aged 70.
