= Children of the Dust (miniseries) =

1995 film

- Also known as: A Good Day to Die
- Genre: Western
- Based on: Children of the Dust by Clancy Carlile
- Teleplay by: Joyce Eliason
- Directed by: David Greene
- Starring: Sidney Poitier; Michael Moriarty; Joanna Going; Hart Bochner; Regina Taylor; Billy Wirth; Robert Guillaume; Farrah Fawcett
- Composer: Mark Snow
- Country of origin: United States
- Original language: English

Production
- Executive producers: Joyce Eliason; Frank Konigsberg
- Producer: Harold Lee Tichenor
- Production location: Alberta, Canada
- Cinematography: Ron Orieux
- Editor: Tod Feuerman
- Running time: 240 minutes
- Production companies: The Königsberg Company; Vidmark Entertainment

Original release
- Network: CBS
- Release: February 26 – February 28, 1995

Children of the Dust is an American Western television miniseries, based on Clancy Carlile's 1995 novel of the same name. Featuring an ensemble cast led by Sidney Poitier, Children of the Dust was originally broadcast by CBS on February 26 and 28, 1995.

== Plot summary ==
In the Oklahoma Territory of the late 1880s, Gypsy Smith (Poitier) is a bounty hunter of African American and Cherokee descent. Smith helps African American homesteaders to settle the territory under the specter of Jim Crow. Meanwhile, a young Native American raised by Whites (Wirth) must choose between the woman that he loves (Going) or his Cheyenne heritage.

== Cast ==
- Sidney Poitier as Gypsy Smith
- Michael Moriarty as John Maxwell
- Joanna Going as Rachel Maxwell
- Hart Bochner as Shelby Hornbeck
- Regina Taylor as Drusilla
- Billy Wirth as Corby White / White Wolf
- Shirley Knight as Aunt Bertha
- Grace Zabriskie as Rose
- James Caviezel as Dexter
- Robert Guillaume as Jolson Mossburger
- Farrah Fawcett as Nora Maxwell
- John Pyper-Ferguson as Sonny Boy
- Katharine Isabelle as Young Rachel
- Byron Chief-Moon as Chief Walks-The-Clouds
- Jesse Lipscombe as Clarence

== DVD ==
On September 20, 1999, the miniseries was released on DVD, under the title A Good Day to Die. However, it was pared down to 120 minutes, and significant portions of the production were omitted.
