= Michael Milhoan =

American actor (born 1957)

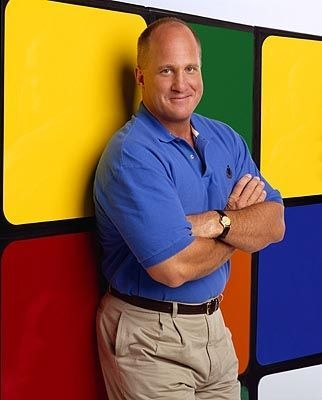
- Milhoan as Bill Larsen in Do Over (2002)
- Born: December 19, 1957 (age 68); St. Petersburg, Florida, U.S.
- Education: North Texas State University
- Occupation: Actor
- Years active: 1982–2008; 2016–present
- Organization: Hollywood Moose
- Height: 1.91 m (6 ft 3 in)

Michael Milhoan (born December 19, 1957) is an American actor, best known as Dante Pacino in Something So Right (1996-1998).

== Early life ==
Milhoan was born and raised in St. Petersburg, Florida. He studied jazz music in his early days, then was involved in a car accident. This left him unable to follow his jazz aspirations so he targeted his interest to the field of acting.

== Career ==
Milhoan appeared in the series Something So Right and in the television movies The Princess and the Marine and A Loss of Innocence. He had a recurring role on 3rd Rock from the Sun as the gym coach of Tommy Solomon, played by Joseph Gordon-Levitt. His film work includes roles in Tin Cup, Pearl Harbor, Collateral Damage, Anywhere but Here, Crimson Tide, Executive Decision, Phenomenon, and Field of Dreams.

Milhoan, who lives in St. Petersburg, is the chief executive officer of a full-service production company.

== Filmography ==
Film
Year	Title	Role	Notes
1982	The Beach Girls	Surfer	(as Michael Paul Milhoan)
1989	Field of Dreams	Buck Weaver - 3B	
1991	The Rocketeer	Jeff	
1991	Lookwell	Policeman #3	TV movie
1992	Honey, I Blew Up the Kid	Captain Ed Myerson	
1992	Sneakers	Russian Driver	Uncredited
1993	Dream Lover	Ray's Lawyer	
1995	Crimson Tide	Chief of the Watch Hunsicker	
1996	Executive Decision	747 First Officer	
1996	Multiplicity	Irate Football Parent	
1996	Phenomenon	Jimmy	
1996	Tin Cup	Boone	
1996	A Loss of Innocence	Ivor Eriksen	TV movie
1997	The Lost World: Jurassic Park	Obnoxious Tourist	Uncredited
1997	Most Wanted	S.W.A.T. Leader	
1997	In Dark Places	Bartender #1	
1998	Bulworth	Cop #1	
1998	Yakima Wash		
1999	She's All That	Principal Stickley	
1999	Anywhere But Here	Cop	
2000	American Virgin	Larry	
2001	Early Bird Special	Rodney	
2001	Pearl Harbor	Army Commander	
2002	Collateral Damage	Jack	
2004	First Daughter	Agent Bock	
2005	Dirty Deeds	Officer Dill	
2005	American Gun	Victim's Father	
2008	The Spirit	Uncle Pete	

Television
Year	Title	Role	Notes
1991	Seinfeld	Security Guard	Episode: "The Stranded"
1993	Lois and Clark: The New Adventures of Superman	Johnny Taylor	Episode: "I've Got a Crush on You"
1996-1998	Something So Right	Dante Pacino	22 Episodes
1999	Tracey Takes On...	Al	Episode: "Hype"
2002	Do Over	Bill Larsen, Joel's father	
2003	Touched By An Angel	Alex Waters	Episode: "At the End of the Aisle"
2004	Reba (TV series)	Nick "Mad Dog" Marrone	Episode: "Fight or Flight"
