= Something So Right (TV series) =

- Created by: Judd Pillot; John Peaslee
- Starring: Mel Harris; Jere Burns; Billy L. Sullivan; Marne Patterson; Emily Ann Lloyd; Carol Ann Susi; Michael Milhoan; Christine Dunford; Barry Jenner
- Composer: Bruce Miller
- Country of origin: United States
- Original language: English
- No. of seasons: 2
- No. of episodes: 37

Production
- Executive producers: John Peaslee; Judd Pillot; Bob Tischler
- Camera setup: Multi-camera
- Running time: 30 minutes
- Production companies: Big Phone Productions; Universal Television

Original release
- Network: NBC
- Release: September 17, 1996 – May 6, 1997
- Network: ABC
- Release: March 3 – July 7, 1998

Something So Right is an American sitcom television series which ran on two different networks during its time on the air.

Something So Right starred Mel Harris as Carly Davis, a twice-divorced party planner who had married Jack Farrell (Jere Burns), a divorced English teacher. They had three children, one from each of their former marriages.

This program premiered on NBC on September 17, 1996, hammocked between the Top 30 hit Mad About You and the Top 20 hit Frasier; the hammocking effort did not work, and it was canceled the following spring after finishing the season in 39th place with a 9.5 rating. It was picked up as a midseason replacement on ABC the next year, running until July 7, 1998, finishing its second season in 56th place with an 8.2 rating.

== Characters ==
- Carly Davis (Mel Harris) – Carly is a party planner married to Jack Farrell. She has two biological children from two previous husbands: her son Will, from her first husband, Dante Pacino, and her daughter Sarah, from her second husband, Sheldon Kramer.
- Jack Farrell (Jere Burns) – Jack is a teacher and is currently married to Carly. He has a daughter named Nicole from his ex-wife Stephanie. Jack also has two stepchildren, Will and Sarah.
- Will Pacino (Billy L. Sullivan) – Carly's son from her first husband, Dante. Will lives with his mother, stepfather, half-sister, and stepsister. In the first few episodes, Will starts having a crush on Nicole, but he later falls in love with her friend Cindy and dates a girl named Jenny in one episode.
- Nicole Farrell (Marne Patterson) – Nicole is Jack's daughter from his ex-wife Stephanie. She lives with her father, stepmother, and two stepsiblings.
- Sarah Kramer (Emily Ann Lloyd) – Sarah is Carly's daughter from Carly's second husband Sheldon. Sarah is very wise for her age. She lives with her mother, stepfather, half-brother, and stepsister.
- Gracie (Carol Ann Susi – NBC series, Traci Lords – ABC series) – Gracie is Carly's assistant.
- Dante Pacino (Michael Milhoan) – Dante is Carly's first husband and Will's father. He does not seem too intelligent.
- Stephanie Farrell (Christine Dunford) – Stephanie is Jack's ex-wife and Nicole's mother. She was an actress who had the starring role on the show Thena Warrior Goddess (A spoof of the show Xena Warrior Princess). She later started dating Sheldon after he divorced his second wife Marianne.
- Sheldon Kramer (Barry Jenner) – Sheldon is Carly's second husband and Sarah's father. He is a millionaire. He starts the series by being married to his second wife, Marianne, but eventually divorces her and then starts dating Stephanie in the second season.
- Ben Davis (Bob Barker) – Ben is Carly's widower father. He lives alone and is seen as somewhat of a "ladies man" after his wife's passing.

== Episodes ==
With the exception of the "Pilot", every episode title begins with "Something About".

=== Series overview ===
Season	Episodes	Originally released		
Season	Episodes	First released	Last released	Network
1	24	September 17, 1996	May 6, 1997	NBC
2	13	March 3, 1998	July 7, 1998	ABC

=== Season 1 (1996–97) ===
No. overall	No. in season	Title	Directed by	Written by	Original release date	Prod. code	Viewers (millions)
1	1	"Pilot"	James Widdoes	John Peaslee & Judd Pillot	September 17, 1996	83590	20.85
2	2	"Something About Jack's Ex"	James Widdoes	Jane Espenson	September 24, 1996	K1202	17.8
3	3	"Something About Seared Ahi"	James Widdoes	Kevin Kelton	October 15, 1996	K1201	11.9
4	4	"Something About a Family Photo"	James Widdoes	Eric Zicklin	October 22, 1996	K1205	11.5
5	5	"Something About Schmoozing"	James Widdoes	Kevin Kelton	October 29, 1996	K1207	14.4
6	6	"Something About 12-H"	James Widdoes	Story by : James Widdoes; Teleplay by : Bob Tischler	November 12, 1996	K1209	17.1
7	7	"Something About Protection"	James Widdoes	Daryl Rowland & Lisa DeBenedictis	November 19, 1996	K1206	14.8
8	8	"Something About Thanksgiving"	John Rich	Story by : Rob Krausz; Teleplay by : Jane Espenson	November 26, 1996	K1210	14.6
9	9	"Something About Cheating"	John Rich	John Peaslee & Judd Pillot	December 3, 1996	K1203	12.8
10	10	"Something About an Older Guy"	Max Tash	Bob Tischler	December 10, 1996	K1204	14.4
11	11	"Something About a Christmas Miracle"	Max Tash	Eric Zicklin	December 17, 1996	K1212	13.2
12	12	"Something About Dante Proposing to Heather"	James Widdoes	John Peaslee & Judd Pillot	January 7, 1997	K1213	15.58
13	13	"Something About Reverse Psychology"	Hal Cooper	Eric Zicklin & Kevin Kelton	January 21, 1997	K1214	15.39
14	14	"Something About Cold Storage"	John Rich	Daryl Rowland & Lisa DeBenedictis	February 4, 1997	K1211	N/A
15	15	"Something About How Jack and Carly Met"	Max Tash	John Peaslee & Judd Pillot	February 11, 1997	K1215	11.65
16	16	"Something About a Silver Anniversary"	Max Tash	Kevin Kelton & Jane Espenson	February 18, 1997	K1217	11.47
17	17	"Something About Leeza"	Max Tash	Bob Tischler	February 25, 1997	K1216	11.25
18	18	"Something About My Two Dads"	Max Tash	Story by : John Peaslee & Judd Pillot; Teleplay by : Bob Tischler	March 11, 1997	K1219	13.74
19	19	"Something About Two April Fools"	Max Tash	Carol Gary	April 1, 1997	K1220	12.56
20	20	"Something About Carly on a Hot Tar Roof"	Max Tash	Eric Zicklin	April 8, 1997	K1222	11.85
21	21	"Something About New Beds and Old Friends"	Max Tash	David Silverman & Marcy Gray Rubin	April 15, 1997	K1218	11.11
22	22	"Something About Secrets & Rules"	Max Tash	Jane Espenson	April 22, 1997	K1208	11.31
23	23	"Something About Inter-Ex-Spousal Relations"	Max Tash	John Peaslee & Judd Pillot	April 29, 1997	K1221	10.31
24	24	"Something About Getting the Hell Out of Here"	Max Tash	John Peaslee & Judd Pillot	May 6, 1997	K1223	10.69

=== Season 2 (1998) ===
No. overall	No. in season	Title	Directed by	Written by	Original release date	Prod. code	Viewers (millions)
25	1	"Something About Hitting the Sauce"	James Widdoes	Chip Keyes	March 3, 1998	K2909	13.88
26	2	"Something About Ex-Appeal"	Max Tash	Ari Posner, Eric Preven, John Peaslee & Judd Pillot	March 3, 1998	K2903	12.28
27	3	"Something About a Double Standard"	Gerry Cohen	Dan Gerson	March 10, 1998	K2904	14.16
28	4	"Something About the "Men" in Menstruation"	Max Tash	Tony Sheehan	March 17, 1998	K2902	11.89
29	5	"Something About Hoops and Jumping Through Them"	Tom Moore	Chris Cluess & Stu Kreisman	March 20, 1998	K2911	N/A
30	6	"Something About the Past and a Present"	Max Tash	John Peaslee & Judd Pillot and Steve Sharlet	March 24, 1998	K2905	12.32
31	7	"Something About Disowning Your Father and Flying to Paris Blues"	James Widdoes	Tony Sheehan	March 31, 1998	K2908	11.67
32	8	"Something About Egg on Your Face"	Gerry Cohen	Tony Sheehan	April 7, 1998	K2913	10.84
33	9	"Something About a Second Year"	Max Tash	John Peaslee & Judd Pillot	April 14, 1998	K2901	11.87
34	10	"Something About an Ex-Goddess"	Gerry Cohen	John Peaslee & Judd Pillot & Tony Sheehan	April 21, 1998	K2910	12.14
35	11	"Something About Railroading Carly"	Max Tash	Tony Sheehan	April 28, 1998	K2906	10.88
36	12	"Something About a Rocky Road"	Tom Moore	John Peaslee & Judd Pillot	May 12, 1998	K2912	8.96
37	13	"Something About Burning Meat, Bridges and Rugs"	Max Tash	Ari Posner & Eric Preven	July 7, 1998	K2907	8.9

== Bilbliography ==
- Tim Brooks and Earle Marsh, The Complete Directory to Prime Time Network and Cable TV Shows 1946–Present, Ninth edition (New York: Ballantine Books, 2007) ISBN 978-0-345-49773-4
