= The Last Don (miniseries) =

- Genre: Crime drama
- Based on: The Last Don by Mario Puzo
- Teleplay by: Joyce Eliason
- Directed by: Graeme Clifford
- Starring: Danny Aiello; Kirstie Alley; Rory Cochrane; Joe Mantegna; Jason Gedrick; Daryl Hannah; Penelope Ann Miller; k.d. lang
- Narrated by: Danny Aiello
- Theme music composer: Angelo Badalamenti
- Composer: Roger Bellon
- Country of origin: United States
- Original language: English
- No. of seasons: 1
- No. of episodes: 3

Production
- Executive producers: Joyce Eliason; Frank Konigsberg; Larry Sanitsky
- Producer: James T. Davis
- Cinematography: Gordon C. Lonsdale
- Editors: Tod Feuerman; Kimberly Ray
- Running time: 90 minutes
- Production company: Konigsberg/Sanitsky Company

Original release
- Network: CBS
- Release: May 11 – May 14, 1997

Related
- The Last Don II

The Last Don, also known as Mario Puzo's The Last Don, is a 1997 American crime drama television miniseries directed by Graeme Clifford and written by Joyce Eliason, based on the 1996 novel The Last Don by Mario Puzo. It aired on CBS in three parts, on May 11, 13 and 14, 1997. It was followed by a sequel the next year, The Last Don II. It follows a fictional Mafia crime family, the Clericuzios, and their multigenerational struggle to hold onto power.

== Cast and characters ==
- Danny Aiello as Don Domenico Clericuzio, the Don and patriarch of the Clericuzio family. Aiello compared the character with Shakespeare's King Lear. However, he discouraged comparisons with a previous Puzo character, Marlon Brando's Vito Corleone.
- Joe Mantegna as Joseph "Pippi" De Lena, the Don's nephew and top enforcer.
- Daryl Hannah as Athena Aquitane, a famous actress.
- Jason Gedrick as Croccifixio "Cross" De Lena, Pippi's son and the Don's grandnephew.
  - Timothy Redwine as Young Cross.
- Penelope Ann Miller as Nalene De Lena, a former dancer and Pippi's wife.
- Rory Cochrane as Dante Clericuzio, the Don's erratic and violent grandson.
  - Noah Shebib as Young Dante.
- Robert Wuhl as Bobby Bantz, a Hollywood film producer.
- k.d. lang as Dita Tommey, a Hollywood film director and a lesbian.
- Kirstie Alley as Rose Marie Clericuzio, the Don's daughter.
  - Emily Hampshire as Young Rose Marie.
- David Marciano as Giorgio Clericuzio, the Don's son, who works on Wall Street.
- Christopher Meloni as Boz Skannet, Athena's abusive estranged husband.
- Seymour Cassel as Alfred Gronevelt, the founder and owner of a successful Las Vegas casino.
- Burt Young as Virginio Ballazzo, a Mafia boss and ally of the Clericuzios.
- Cliff De Young as Senator Warren Wavven, a corrupt Senator from Nevada.
- Dennis Boutsikaris as Skippy Deere, a Hollywood film producer.
- Michelle Rene Thomas as Claudia De Lena, Cross's younger sister who becomes a film industry lawyer.
  - Cecilley Carroll as Young Claudia.
- John Colicos as Eli Marrion, the head of Hollywood movie studio.
- Michael Massee as Jim Losey, a corrupt LAPD detective.
- Conrad Dunn as Lia Vazzi, a Sicilian mafioso who Cross helps come to America.
- Mike Starr as Big Tim, a con artist and gambler.
- David Gianopoulos as Peter "Petie" Clericuzio, the Don's son, who runs the family's large construction business.
- Danny Mastrogiorgio as Vincent Clericuzio, the Don's son who later becomes a restaurateur.
- Vincent Pastore as Dan Fuberta, an loak shark and associate of the Clericuzios.
- Quinn Duffy as Silvio Clericuzio, the Don's favorite son.
- Bruno Campos as Jimmy Santadio, Don Santadio's son who tried to find peace between the families.
- Ramona Milano as Ceil Ballazzo, a childhood friend of Cross's.
  - Stacy Rae Klein as Young Ceil.
- Lark Voorhies as Tiffany a stripper.

== Episodes ==
| No. | Title | Directed by | Written by | Original release date |
|---|---|---|---|---|
| 1 | Part I | Graeme Clifford | Joyce Eliason | May 11, 1997 |
In 1964, the only daughter of Mafia Don Domenico Clericuzio, Rose Marie, wishes to marry Jimmy Santadio, the son of the Don Domenico's rival Don Santadio. Rose Marie's brother Silvio agrees to speak to their father on their behalf, but he is ambushed and killed by Jimmy's brothers. At Silvio's funeral, Jimmy swears that he and Don Santadio had no foreknowledge of the attack. After finding out that Rose Marie is pregnant, Don Domenico consents to their marriage on the condition that the only family member that will be present for Rose Marie will be his nephew and top enforcer, Joseph "Pippi" De Lena. The wedding is held at the Santadio mansion, but that night, Pippi and Rose Marie's brothers massacre the Santadios, including Jimmy. Rose Marie is spared but her mental health is destroyed. She is sent to Sicily, but is brought back in time to give birth to her son, Dante, in America. Pippi is sent to Las Vegas to take over the Santadio's shares in a casino, the Xanadu, where he meets the owner, Alfred Gronevelt. While there, he also marries Nalene Jessup, a showgirl. They have a son, Croccifixio, called Cross. Cross and Dante are baptized together in a ceremony at the Clericuzio compound in Quogue, New York. Don Domenico, displeased with Pippi's choice in wife, tells him he will stay in Las Vegas to manage the family's affairs there permanently. Don Domenico also announces to the gathered Dons his family's retirement from all criminal enterprises except for gambling. Ten years later, after Pippi is implicated in a murder, he and Nalene divorce, with her taking their daughter Claudia and Pippi taking Cross. Meanwhile, Dante begins developing violent tendencies at a young age after Rose Marie tells him the truth about his father's death.
| 2 | Part II | Graeme Clifford | Joyce Eliason | May 13, 1997 |
Now an adult in the 1990s, Cross is mentored by his father to eventually take his father's place in the family. Cross makes his bones by killing a man who murdered the daughter of Clericuzio ally Senator Walter Wavven. He is set to participate in the murder of Virginio Ballazzo, a former ally turned government informant, but he refuses due to past friendship with the Ballazzo family. Dante is chosen for the job in his place. During the murder, Pippi becomes concerned that Dante behaves recklessly and enjoys killing. After, Pippi is sent to Sicily until the investigation dies down and Cross takes over his duties. While Pippi is gone, Cross is mentored by Gronevelt, who bequeaths Cross his controlling share in the Xanadu before he dies. Nalene dies of cancer with her children by her side. When Cross goes to Sicily to bring back his father, he speaks on behalf of hunted Sicilian mafioso Lia Vazzi, who Pippi agrees to bring back to America under the Clericuzio's protection. Claudia goes to her brother for help after her client, actress Athena Aquitane is intimidated by her estranged husband Boz Skannet into backing out of a lead role in a film, Messalina. Cross and Vazzi kill Skannet, and Cross begins a relationship with Athena, meeting her daughter, Bethany, who is institutionalized due to her autism. Meanwhile, Dante behavior becomes more erratic, and the Clericuzios cover up a murder he commits. An unknown assailant kills Pippi while he is on his way to meet his fiancée.
| 3 | Part III | Graeme Clifford | Joyce Eliason | May 14, 1997 |
After Pippi's funeral, Don Domenico and his sons tell Cross the truth about the events of the Santadio war. Cross distrusts the Clericuzios and investigates the truth about his father's death. After finding out that Dante killed his father, Cross goes to Lia Vazzi for help planning his revenge. Using the production wrap-up party for Messalina as cover, Cross lures Dante to Las Vegas. After murdering Dante and his police accomplice, Jim Losey, they are called to the Clericuzio compound. Cross bargains with the Clericuzios, having to give up his shares in the Xanadu in return for only being exiled as punishment for Dante's murder. Cross then decides to live with Athena and her daughter in Paris.

== Reception ==
The series received mixed to negative reviews from critics. As another adaptation of a mafia novel by Mario Puzo, The Last Don received unfavorable comparisons to The Godfather film series. John J. O'Conner of the New York Times stated that the series was too willing to reuse aspects from The Godfather, calling it "too familiar." Ray Richmond of Variety had mixed feelings on the series, describing it as "a pretty decent trash wallow, if an overlong and often preposterous one," though he praised the performances of Joe Mantegna as mafia hitman Pippi De Lena. Scott D. Pierce of the Deseret News was more favorable, stating that "the story is intriguing, the cast is good (for the most part) and - if you have a strong stomach for violence and blood - it's relatively involving entertainment." Hal Boedeker of the Orlando Sentinel was very unfavorable, saying that the series "drags on for six numbing hours, dwells on unappealing mob figures and contains ludicrous performances." Jeffrey Goldberg of Slate called the series "derivative," stating that the writer and director "have taken every element of fantasy in Puzo’s fable and made it literal, and they manage, quite successfully, to telegraph each Puzo twist about two hours before it is set to occur."

=== Awards and nominations ===
The series received three nominations at the 49th Primetime Emmy Awards, including Outstanding Miniseries, Outstanding Supporting Actor in a Miniseries or a Special for Joe Mantegna as Pippi De Lena and Outstanding Supporting Actress in a Miniseries or a Special Kirstie Alley as Rose Marie. The series also received a nomination at for Best Performance in a TV Movie / Pilot / Mini-Series: Supporting Young Actor at the 19th Youth in Film Awards for Tim Redwine as young Cross.

The Last Don was also nominated for a TCA Award for Outstanding Achievement in Movies, Miniseries and Specials.
