= Mary Jo Nye =

American historian of science (born 1944)

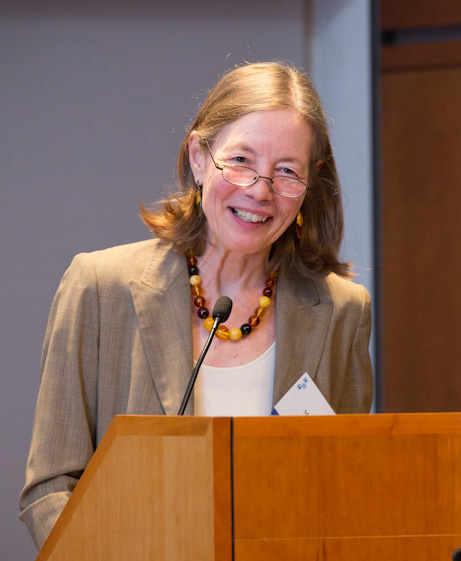
- Recipient of the 2013 Roy G. Neville Prize
- Born: December 5, 1944 (age 81)
- Education: Vanderbilt University, University of Wisconsin–Madison
- Occupation: American historian of science
- Employer(s): University of Oklahoma, Oregon State University
- Spouse: Robert A. Nye
- Awards: Dexter Award, 1999; Sarton Medal, 2006; Roy G. Neville Prize, 2013

Mary Jo Nye (born December 5, 1944) is an American historian of science and Horning Professor in the Humanities emerita of the History Department at Oregon State University. She is known for her work on the relationships between scientific discovery and social and political phenomena.

== Early life and education ==
External videos
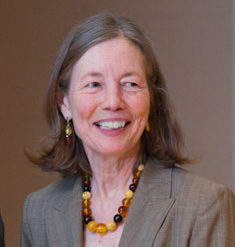
- Mary Jo Nye, “Video: Session Chair, "Scientists and Textbooks”, Oregon State University

Nye was born December 5, 1944, to Joe Allen and Mildred Mann of Nashville, Tennessee. She began her undergraduate studies as a chemistry major at Vanderbilt University, but became interested in history of science after taking a class from Robert Siegfried. In 1964 she left Vanderbilt to attend the University of Wisconsin–Madison, where she completed her BA in Chemistry in 1965.

She married Robert A. Nye, also a historian, on February 17, 1968. They traveled to France to do doctoral research in 1968: their trip coincided with revolutionary unrest and offered them opportunities to learn French cooking. Mary Jo Nye completed a Ph.D. in history of science at the University of Wisconsin in 1970, advised by Erwin N. Hiebert, whom Nye credits for his egalitarian support of women students. At the time, students studying the 19th and 20th century were also a minority in the field. Nye's generation of scholars is credited with creating a shift that embraces international perspectives and examines the interactions of politics and science.

== Career ==
Nye was awarded a National Science Foundation post-doc in the history of science in 1969. In 1970 she began teaching part-time at the University of Oklahoma, later moving to a tenure-track position. She was appointed Assistant Professor in 1975, Associate Professor in 1978, served as Acting Chair of the History of Science department in 1981, and became a Full Professor in 1985. In 1991 she was named George Lynn Cross Research Professor in the History of Science. She and her husband, also a faculty member, shared responsibility for caring for their daughter and frequently traveled to France for research. Their interests later broadened to include England and Germany, as Nye studied the British physicist and Nobel laureate P.M.S. Blackett. In 1993, Nye was appointed chair of the History of Science Department at the University of Oklahoma.

Mary Jo Nye was active in the History of Science Society (HSS), serving as vice-president in 1987 and succeeding Bill Coleman as president from 1988-1989 when he became ill. She has also served as Second Vice-President of the Division of History of Science in the International Union of History and Philosophy of Science. She has held a number of visiting research appointments at institutions including the University of Pittsburgh, Rutgers University, the Institute for Advanced Study in Princeton, Churchill College at the University of Cambridge, the Max Planck Institute for the History of Science in Berlin, and Harvard University.

In 1994, Nye and her husband were co-appointed as Thomas Hart and Mary Jones Horning Professors of the Humanities and Professors of History at Oregon State University. At OSU she became interested in Linus Pauling, whose papers are held by the university and whose career covers much of the 20th century. She worked as well on Hungarian-born physical chemist and philosopher Michael Polanyi. Nye retired from Oregon State University in 2009.

=== Research interests ===
- The history of chemistry and physics since the eighteenth century in Western Europe, Great Britain and the United States
- The social and cultural history of science, including laboratory science, university education, and the political activities of scientists
- The philosophy of science, especially relations between theory and evidence
- Studies of Michael Polanyi and P.M.S. Blackett

== Awards and honors ==
- 2020 Franklin-Lavoisier Prize
- 2017 Abraham Pais Prize for History of Physics Recipient from the American Physical Society
- 2013 John and Martha Morris Prize for Outstanding Achievement in the History of Modern Chemistry, from the Society for the History of Alchemy and Chemistry
- 2013 Roy G. Neville Prize in Bibliography or Biography from the Chemical Heritage Foundation for her book Michael Polanyi and His Generation: Origins of the Social Construction of Science
- 2006 History of Science Society's George Sarton Medal for Lifetime Scholarly Achievement
- 2005 Elected as a Corresponding Member of the Académie Internationale d'Histoire des Sciences
- 1999 Dexter Award for outstanding achievement in the history of chemistry of the American Chemical Society
- 1998 Elected as a Fellow of the American Association for the Advancement of Science
- 1993 Elected as a Fellow of the American Academy of Arts and Sciences

Mary Jo's work has brilliantly illuminated important areas of the history of modern European and American physics and chemistry ... Her elegant writing is always a joy to read, her research as deep as it is broad and her historical arguments are judicious and convincing.

— Alan Rocke, 2006

== Publications (selections) ==
=== As author ===
- Molecular reality; A perspective on the scientific work of Jean Perrin, London: MacDonald, 1972
- Science in the Provinces: Scientific Communities and Provincial Leadership in France, 1860-1930, University of California Press, 1986, ISBN 0-520-05561-6
- From chemical philosophy to theoretical chemistry : dynamics of matter and dynamics of disciplines, 1800 - 1950, Berkeley: Univ. of California Press, 1993
- Before Big Science: The Pursuit of Modern Chemistry and Physics, 1800-1940, Harvard University Press, Reprint 1999, ISBN 0-674-06382-1
- Was Linus Pauling a Revolutionary Chemist? (Award Address - Dexter Award) in: Bull. Hist. Chem. 25 (2000), 73-82.
- Blackett. Physics, War, and Politics in the Twentieth Century, Harvard University Press, 2004 - ISBN 0-674-01548-7 - about the English physicist Patrick Maynard Stuart Blackett
- Michael Polanyi and His Generation: Origins of the Social Construction of Science, The University of Chicago Press, 2011. ISBN 9780226103174

=== As editor ===
- The invention of physical science : intersections of mathematics, theology and natural philosophy since the seventeenth century; essays in honor of Erwin N. Hiebert, Dordrecht: Kluwer, 1992
- The Cambridge History of Science, Vol. 5: The Modern Physical and Mathematical Sciences, Cambridge University Press, 2002, ISBN 0-521-57199-5

== Personal life ==
Mary Jo Nye lives in Oregon with her husband, historian of sexuality Robert A. Nye. They have one daughter, Lesley.
