= Inside Las Vegas =

Book by Mario Puzo

- U.S. first edition cover
- Author: Mario Puzo
- Genre: Non-fiction
- Publisher: Grosset & Dunlap
- Publication date: 1977

Inside Las Vegas is a non-fiction book by Mario Puzo, one of only two non-fiction works by this author. Published in 1977, it gives an in-depth behind the scenes look at the world of gambling in Las Vegas.
