= Fools Die =

Novel by Mario Puzo

- First edition
- Author: Mario Puzo
- Language: English
- Genre: Crime novel
- Publisher: G. P. Putnam's Sons
- Publication date: 9 October 1978
- Publication place: United States
- Media type: Print (hardback & paperback) & Audiobook
- Pages: 544 pp (Paperback edition)
- ISBN: 0-399-12244-3 (Hardcover edition) & ISBN 0-451-16019-3 (Paperback editions)
- OCLC: 3912796
- Dewey Decimal: 813/.5/4
- LC Class: PZ4.P994 Fn 1978 PS3566.U9
- Preceded by: The Godfather
- Followed by: The Sicilian

Fools Die is a 1978 novel by Italian-American author Mario Puzo. Played out in the worlds of gambling, publishing and the film industry, John Merlyn and his brother Artie Merlyn obey their own code of honor in the ferment of 1950s America, where law and organized crime are one and the same. Set in New York, Hollywood, and Las Vegas, Mario Puzo considered Fools Die to be his personal favorite. The protagonist, John Merlyn, is mostly based on Mario Puzo himself. The paperback rights to the book were sold in 1978 by the publisher, G. P. Putnam's Sons, to New American Library for a then-record $2.55 million.

== Plot ==
Fools Die starts in Las Vegas, where a group of close friends, including John Merlyn, Cully Cross, and Jordan Hawley, spend several weeks gambling at the Hotel Xanadu. None of these now close friends have met before meeting in Vegas, and indeed they are not long term friends, but simply people who for their own personal reasons have decided to stay in the hotel to gamble. The trio has adventures both gambling and womanizing in Vegas. One night, after a huge $500,000 baccarat and craps win, a depressed Jordan kills himself in his hotel room. Jordan's suicide was in spite of tying a dramatic winner take all $500,000 hand of baccarat, betting against the casino's owner, Alfred Gronevelt. After Jordan's death, Merlyn returns to his family in New York City and continues his life. Cully Cross decides to stay in Las Vegas permanently, and through his prowess as a gambler and a hustler, he has caught the eye of Alfred Gronevelt, the Xanadu Hotel owner. Gronevelt eventually recruits Cully as a key employee, and as time goes on, he grooms Cully as his second in command, and Cully prospers running the casino, and acting as a casino host.

In New York, John Merlyn, who was an orphan and is now a government worker and moonlighting novel writer, struggles to make ends meet for his family. His father in law had helped him get the job as an administrative officer in a US Army Recruitment Center. One day, because he is near broke, Merlyn is persuaded by a crooked colleague at work to start taking bribery kick backs in return for getting the adult children of wealthy people out of the military draft by having them join the military reserve before their mailed draft notice is filed. Eventually, authorities find out about the draft scam, and Merlyn is put under grand jury investigation. Merlyn narrowly escapes any Federal charges by calling his old friend, the now mob connected casino manager Cully Cross in Las Vegas. Cross is able to use his political and business connections to get Merlyn off the legal hook. Soon thereafter, Merlyn is offered a job writing book reviews for a large magazine. There he meets a world-famous writer named Osano, and they become close friends. During this time, Merlyn has a successful novel published, and Hollywood studios bid on making the novel into a movie. The winning studio flies Merlyn to L.A to help with the novel's movie script, and to work with the movie producers. In California, Merlyn slowly falls in love with Janelle, a film actress. In the meantime, Merlyn becomes estranged from film production as he becomes aware of the subordination of writers to profit and studio drama that dominates in Hollywood. One several years, most of the people Merlyn feels closest to die. His dear friend, Cully Cross had been involved in an elaborate money exchange scheme with a Japanese millionaire customer at the Hotel Xanadu he worked at. While in Japan, in a move ordered by Gronevelt, the Xanadu owner, Cully is murdered. Merlyn's brother, Artie, dies after a sudden heart attack. After many years of partying and carousing with Merlyn, and even sleeping with Merlyn's girlfriend Janelle, Osano finds he suffers from an incurable disease and decides to kill himself. As his business heir, Merlyn is surprised to find out that the manuscript Osano said he had been working on for more than ten years only consists of six completed pages (pages that are used as introduction to "Fools Die"). Eventually, even Janelle also dies, from a brain aneurysm.
