= The Runaway Summer of Davie Shaw =

1966 children's book by Mario Puzo

- U.S. first edition cover
- Author: Mario Puzo
- Language: English
- Publisher: Platt & Munk
- Publication date: 1966

The Runaway Summer of Davie Shaw is a children's novel by Mario Puzo, first published in 1966.

Two chapters were included in the 1972 collection The Godfather Papers and Other Confessions, a selection of the author's writings, including two short stories, book reviews, and magazine articles.

== Plot ==
The plot revolves around a boy named Davie Shaw, who is left with his grandparents for the summer while his parents take off on a round-the-world trip in celebration of their wedding anniversary. Davie has adventures of his own that take him throughout the United States on his pony.
