= Mark Snow =

American composer for film and television (1946–2025)

- Born: Martin Fulterman; August 26, 1946; New York City, U.S.
- Died: July 4, 2025 (aged 78); Washington, Connecticut, U.S.
- Occupation: Composer
- Years active: 1964–2024
- Spouse: Glynnis Daly
- Children: 3

Mark Snow (born Martin Fulterman; August 26, 1946 – July 4, 2025) was an American composer for film and television. He was perhaps best known for composing the theme for The X-Files, and would compose for the show's initial nine-season run from 1993 to 2001. He would return for the show's revival from 2015 to 2018. Additionally, he composed the score for the two feature films and the short-lived spinoff series The Lone Gunmen.

In addition to The X-Files, Snow would serve as composer for shows including Smallville, Blue Bloods, Ghost Whisperer, Hart to Hart, Millennium, One Tree Hill, the 2002 revival of The Twilight Zone and Starsky & Hutch.

== Early life and education ==
Snow was born Martin Fulterman to a Jewish family in Brooklyn, New York, on August 26, 1946. His grandfather immigrated to the United States from Poland. After graduating from the High School of Music & Art in 1964, he attended the Juilliard School. With roommate Michael Kamen, Snow formed a band called Emil and the Detectives, which later became the group New York Rock & Roll Ensemble. After an unsuccessful attempt to become a record producer, he moved to Los Angeles in 1974 and began composing. Around this time, he changed his name to Mark Snow.

== Career ==
Among his most famous compositions is the theme music for science fiction television series The X-Files, working on the series for the show's initial nine-season run from 1993 to 2001. He landed the job in part because he lived in close proximity to creator Chris Carter, enabling easy communication between the two.

The theme did not come easily to Snow, with Carter rejecting earlier motifs that were louder and bolder. It began taking its eventual shape when Snow accidentally placed his hand on his keyboard while an echo sound effect was programmed; intrigued by the ethereal sound, he used it as a model for the rest of the theme. Alongside the show's success, the theme was released as a single, topping the charts in France and reaching #2 in the United Kingdom. He would return for the show's revival from 2015 to 2018. Additionally, he composed the score for the two feature films and the short-lived spinoff series The Lone Gunmen.

In addition to The X-Files, Snow also served as composer for shows including Smallville, Blue Bloods, Ghost Whisperer, Hart to Hart, Millennium, One Tree Hill, the 2002 revival of The Twilight Zone and Starsky & Hutch. He was nominated for a César Award for scoring the 2006 Alain Resnais film Private Fears in Public Places. He also composed the theme to the TV series La Femme Nikita which ran from 1997 to 2001.

== Personal life and death ==
Snow was married to Glynnis Daly, and had three children. Through his marriage to Daly, a daughter of actor James Daly, Snow was a brother-in-law to actress Tyne Daly and actor Tim Daly.

Snow died from myelodysplastic syndrome at his home in Washington, Connecticut, on July 4, 2025, at the age of 78.

== Works ==
=== Television series ===
| Year | Title | Notes |
|---|---|---|
| 1975–1976 | The Rookies | 6 episodes |
| 1976 | Gemini Man | 1 episode |
| 1976 | Visions | 2 episodes |
| 1977 | The San Pedro Beach Bums | Theme music |
| 1977–1979 | Starsky & Hutch | 16 episodes |
| 1979 | Flatbush | 1 episode |
| 1978–1979 | The Next Step Beyond | 6 episodes |
| 1979 | Brothers and Sisters | 12 episodes |
| 1980 | When the Whistle Blows | 7 episodes |
| 1978–1980 | Family | 16 episodes |
| 1978–1981 | Vega$ | 4 episodes |
| 1978–1982 | The Love Boat | 3 episodes |
| 1979–1981 | 240-Robert | 6 episodes |
| 1979–1984 | Hart to Hart | 93 episodes |
| 1981 | Dynasty | 4 episodes |
| 1981 | Strike Force | 1 episode |
| 1981–1984 | Cagney & Lacey | 5 episodes |
| 1982 | T. J. Hooker | 5 episodes |
| 1983 | The Family Tree | 3 episodes |
| 1983 | Matt Houston | 1 episode |
| 1983–1984 | Lottery! | 7 episodes |
| 1984 | Paper Dolls | 11 episodes |
| 1984–1985 | Crazy Like a Fox | 16 episodes |
| 1986 | Bridges to Cross | 1 episode |
| 1986 | Kay O'Brien | 3 episodes |
| 1986–1988 | Aaron's Way | 10 episodes |
| 1986–1988 | Falcon Crest | 40 episodes |
| 1987 | CBS Summer Playhouse | 1 episode |
| 1989–1990 | Pee-wee's Playhouse | 4 episodes |
| 1991 | All Together Now | 1 episode |
| 1992–1993 | Dark Justice | 52 episodes |
| 1993–2002, 2016–2018 | The X-Files | 217 episodes |
| 1995–1996 | Nowhere Man | 25 episodes |
| 1996 | Dark Skies | Pilot Episode |
| 1997 | 20,000 Leagues Under the Sea | 2 episodes |
| 1997 | Perversions of Science | 1 episode |
| 1996–1999 | Millennium | 67 episodes |
| 1999–2000 | Harsh Realm | 9 episodes |
| 2000–2001 | Bull | 20 episodes |
| 2001 | The Lone Gunmen | 13 episodes |
| 2001–2002 | Pasadena | 13 episodes |
| 2001–2007 | Smallville | 132 episodes |
| 2002 | Haunted | 11 episodes |
| 2002–2003 | Birds of Prey | 13 episodes |
| 2002–2003 | The Twilight Zone | 43 episodes |
| 2003–2005 | One Tree Hill | 29 episodes |
| 2005 | Kojak | 9 episodes |
| 2005–2010 | Ghost Whisperer | 107 episodes |
| 2010–2024 | Blue Bloods | 287 episodes |
| 2011–2012 | Ringer | 12 episodes |

=== Television films ===
| Year | Title | Director | Notes |
|---|---|---|---|
| 1976 | The Boy in the Plastic Bubble | Randal Kleiser | —N/a |
| 1978 | Big Bob Johnson and His Fantastic Speed Circus | Jack Starrett | —N/a |
| 1978 | Overboard | John Newland | —N/a |
| 1979 | The Return of Mod Squad | George McCowan | —N/a |
| 1980 | Casino | Don Chaffey | —N/a |
| 1980 | Angel City | Philip Leacock | —N/a |
| 1981 | Off Sides (Pigs vs. Freaks) | Dick Lowry | —N/a |
| 1982 | Paper Dolls | Edward Zwick | —N/a |
| 1982 | Games Mother Never Taught You | Lee Philips | —N/a |
| 1982 | I'd Rather Be Calm | Linda Day | —N/a |
| 1983 | Malibu | E. W. Swackhamer | —N/a |
| 1983 | Packin' It In | E. W. Swackhamer | —N/a |
| 1983 | Two Kinds of Love | Jack Bender | —N/a |
| 1983 | The Winter of Our Discontent | Waris Hussein | —N/a |
| 1984 | Something About Amelia | Randa Haines | —N/a |
| 1984 | A Good Sport | Lou Antonio | —N/a |
| 1984 | Secrets of a Married Man | William A. Graham | —N/a |
| 1984 | I Married a Centerfold | Peter Werner | —N/a |
| 1985 | Not My Kid | Michael Tuchner | —N/a |
| 1985 | Challenge of a Lifetime | Russ Mayberry | —N/a |
| 1985 | California Girls | Rick Wallace | —N/a |
| 1985 | The Lady from Yesterday | Robert Day | —N/a |
| 1985 | International Airport | Don Chaffey; Charles S. Dubin | —N/a |
| 1985 | Rockhopper | Bill Bixby | —N/a |
| 1985 | Royal Match | E.W. Swackhamer | —N/a |
| 1985 | Beverly Hills Cowgirl Blues | Corey Allen | —N/a |
| 1985 | I Dream of Jeannie... Fifteen Years Later | William Asher | —N/a |
| 1986 | One Terrific Guy | Lou Antonio | —N/a |
| 1986 | Blood & Orchids | Jerry Thorpe | Composed with Charles Fox |
| 1986 | Acceptable Risks | Rick Wallace | —N/a |
| 1986 | News at Eleven | Mike Robe | —N/a |
| 1986 | Louis L'Amour's Down the Long Hills | Burt Kennedy | —N/a |
| 1986 | One Police Plaza | Jerry Jameson | —N/a |
| 1987 | Warm Hearts, Cold Feet | James Frawley | —N/a |
| 1987 | Pals | Lou Antonio | —N/a |
| 1987 | Murder by the Book | Mel Damski | —N/a |
| 1987 | Still Crazy Like a Fox | Paul Krasny | —N/a |
| 1987 | Murder Ordained | Mike Robe | —N/a |
| 1987 | Cracked Up | Karen Arthur | —N/a |
| 1987 | Kids Like These | Georg Stanford Brown | —N/a |
| 1987 | A Hobo's Christmas | Will Mackenzie | —N/a |
| 1987 | The Father Clements Story | Edwin Sherin | —N/a |
| 1987 | Roman Holiday | Noel Nosseck | —N/a |
| 1988 | Alone in the Neon Jungle | Georg Stanford Brown | —N/a |
| 1988 | The Return of Ben Casey | Joseph L. Scanlan | —N/a |
| 1988 | Bluegrass | Simon Wincer | —N/a |
| 1988 | Scandal in a Small Town | Anthony Page | —N/a |
| 1988 | The Secret Life of Kathy McCormick | Robert Lewis | —N/a |
| 1988 | Ladykillers | Robert Michael Lewis | —N/a |
| 1988 | Disaster at Silo 7 | Larry Elikann | —N/a |
| 1988 | Goodbye, Miss 4th of July | George Miller | —N/a |
| 1988 | Aaron's Way: The Harvest | Noel Nosseck | —N/a |
| 1989 | Those She Left Behind | Noel Nosseck | —N/a |
| 1989 | Everybody's Baby: The Rescue of Jessica McClure | Mel Damski | —N/a |
| 1989 | Stuck with Each Other | Georg Stanford Brown | —N/a |
| 1989 | Settle the Score | Edwin Sherin | —N/a |
| 1989 | When He's Not a Stranger | John Gray | —N/a |
| 1990 | Miracle Landing | Dick Lowry | —N/a |
| 1990 | The Girl Who Came Between Them | Mel Damski | —N/a |
| 1990 | Follow Your Heart | Noel Nosseck | —N/a |
| 1990 | Child in the Night | Mike Robe | —N/a |
| 1990 | Archie: To Riverdale and Back Again | Dick Lowry | —N/a |
| 1990 | Dead Reckoning | Robert Michael Lewis | —N/a |
| 1990 | The Little Kidnappers | Donald Shebib | —N/a |
| 1990 | The Lost Capone | John Gray | —N/a |
| 1990 | Opposites Attract | Noel Nosseck | —N/a |
| 1990 | Crash: The Mystery of Flight 1501 | Philip Saville | —N/a |
| 1990 | In the Line of Duty: A Cop for the Killing | Dick Lowry | —N/a |
| 1991 | The Marla Hanson Story | John Gray | —N/a |
| 1991 | White Hot: The Mysterious Murder of Thelma Todd | Paul Wendkos | —N/a |
| 1991 | In the Line of Duty: Manhunt in the Dakotas | Dick Lowry | —N/a |
| 1991 | Living a Lie | Larry Shaw | —N/a |
| 1991 | The Rape of Doctor Willis | Lou Antonio | —N/a |
| 1991 | The Gambler Returns: The Luck of the Draw | Dick Lowry | —N/a |
| 1991 | Wife, Mother, Murderer | Mel Damski | —N/a |
| 1991 | Dead and Alive: The Race for Gus Farace | Peter Markle | —N/a |
| 1992 | Battling for Baby | Art Wolff | —N/a |
| 1992 | The Last P.O.W.? The Bobby Garwood Story | Georg Stanford Brown | —N/a |
| 1992 | A Woman Scorned: The Betty Broderick Story | Dick Lowry | —N/a |
| 1992 | Highway Heartbreaker | Paul Schneider | —N/a |
| 1992 | Deliver Them from Evil: The Taking of Alta View | Peter Levin | —N/a |
| 1992 | In the Line of Duty: Street War | Dick Lowry | —N/a |
| 1992 | A Taste for Killing | Lou Antonio | —N/a |
| 1992 | The Danger of Love: The Carolyn Warmus Story | Joyce Chopra | —N/a |
| 1992 | An American Story | John Gray | —N/a |
| 1992 | Her Final Fury: Betty Broderick, the Last Chapter | Dick Lowry | —N/a |
| 1993 | Telling Secrets | Marvin J. Chomsky | —N/a |
| 1993 | The Disappearance of Nora | Joyce Chopra | —N/a |
| 1993 | The Man with Three Wives | Peter Levin | —N/a |
| 1993 | Father & Son: Dangerous Relations | Georg Stanford Brown | —N/a |
| 1993 | Born Too Soon | Noel Nosseck | —N/a |
| 1993 | In the Line of Duty: Ambush in Waco | Dick Lowry | —N/a |
| 1993 | Precious Victims | Peter Levin | —N/a |
| 1993 | Scattered Dreams | Neema Barnette | —N/a |
| 1994 | Murder Between Friends | Waris Hussein | —N/a |
| 1994 | In the Line of Duty: The Price of Vengeance | Dick Lowry | —N/a |
| 1994 | Witness to the Execution | Tommy Lee Wallace | —N/a |
| 1994 | A Place for Annie | John Gray | —N/a |
| 1994 | Moment of Truth: Cradle of Conspiracy | Gabrielle Beaumont | —N/a |
| 1994 | Heart of a Child | Sandor Stern | —N/a |
| 1994 | The Substitute Wife | Peter Werner | —N/a |
| 1994 | Moment of Truth: Caught in the Crossfire | Chuck Bowman | —N/a |
| 1994 | Shadows of Desire | Sam Pillsbury | —N/a |
| 1995 | Texas Justice | Dick Lowry | —N/a |
| 1995 | A Stranger in Town | Peter Levin | —N/a |
| 1995 | The Other Mother: A Moment of Truth Movie | Bethany Rooney | —N/a |
| 1995 | Seduced and Betrayed | Félix Enríquez Alcalá | —N/a |
| 1995 | Down, Out & Dangerous | Noel Nosseck | —N/a |
| 1995 | The Unspoken Truth | Peter Werner | —N/a |
| 1995 | Trial by Fire | Alan Metzger | —N/a |
| 1995 | In the Line of Duty: Hunt for Justice | Dick Lowry | —N/a |
| 1995 | Mixed Blessings | Bethany Rooney | —N/a |
| 1996 | Smoke Jumpers | Dick Lowry | —N/a |
| 1996 | Project ALF | Dick Lowry | —N/a |
| 1996 | Conundrum | Douglas Barr | —N/a |
| 1996 | Sweet Temptation | Ron Lagomarsino | —N/a |
| 1996 | Forgotten Sins | Dick Lowry | —N/a |
| 1996 | Special Report: Journey to Mars | Robert Mandel | —N/a |
| 1996 | Summer of Fear | Mike Robe | —N/a |
| 1996 | A Loss of Innocence | Graeme Clifford | —N/a |
| 1996 | Phone Calls from the Dead | —N/a | —N/a |
| 1997 | Payback | Ken Cameron | —N/a |
| 1997 | The Perfect Mother | Peter Levin | —N/a |
| 1997 | Night Sins | Robert Allan Ackerman | —N/a |
| 1997 | The Price of Heaven | Peter Bogdanovich | —N/a |
| 1997 | Cloned | Douglas Barr | —N/a |
| 1997 | The Day Lincoln Was Shot | John Gray | —N/a |
| 1999 | A Memory in My Heart | Harry Winer | —N/a |
| 1999 | A Touch of Hope | Craig R. Baxley | —N/a |
| 2000 | In the Name of the People | Peter Levin | —N/a |
| 2000 | Code Name Phoenix | Jeff Freilich | —N/a |
| 2000 | Another Woman's Husband | Noel Nosseck | —N/a |
| 2000 | Murder, She Wrote: A Story to Die For | Anthony Pullen Shaw | —N/a |
| 2000 | Dirty Pictures | Frank Pierson | —N/a |
| 2000 | Sole Survivor | Mikael Salomon | —N/a |
| 2001 | For Love of Olivia | Douglas Barr | —N/a |
| 2003 | Critical Assembly | Eric Laneuville | —N/a |
| 2003 | D.C. Sniper: 23 Days of Fear | Tom McLoughlin | —N/a |
| 2004 | She's Too Young | Tom McLoughlin | —N/a |
| 2004 | Helter Skelter | John Gray | —N/a |
| 2004 | Bereft | Tim Daly | —N/a |
| 2004 | Paradise | Frank Pierson | —N/a |
| 2005 | Odd Girl Out | Tom McLoughlin | —N/a |

=== Theatrical films ===
| Year | Title | Director | Notes |
|---|---|---|---|
| 1977 | Flush | Andrew J. Kuehn | —N/a |
| 1978 | Skateboard | George Gage | —N/a |
| 1979 | Something Short of Paradise | David Helpern | —N/a |
| 1981 | High Risk | Stewart Raffill | —N/a |
| 1983 | Over Here, Mr. President | Noam Pitlik | —N/a |
| 1986 | Jake Speed | Andrew Lane | —N/a |
| 1988 | The In Crowd | Mark Rosenthal | —N/a |
| 1988 | Ernest Saves Christmas | John R. Cherry III | —N/a |
| 1991 | Dolly Dearest | Maria Lease | —N/a |
| 1994 | Caroline at Midnight | Scott McGinnis | —N/a |
| 1994 | Playmaker | Yuri Zeltser | —N/a |
| 1995 | Dead Badge | Douglas Barr | —N/a |
| 1995 | Born to Be Wild | John Gray | —N/a |
| 1998 | The X-Files | Rob Bowman | —N/a |
| 1998 | Disturbing Behavior | David Nutter | —N/a |
| 1999 | Stranger in My House | Joe Cacaci | —N/a |
| 1999 | Crazy in Alabama | Antonio Banderas | —N/a |
| 2006 | Private Fears in Public Places | Alain Resnais | —N/a |
| 2008 | The Hamlet Adventure | Ivaylo Dikanski; Greg Roach | —N/a |
| 2008 | The X-Files: I Want to Believe | Chris Carter | —N/a |
| 2008 | Adventures in Appletown | Robert Moresco | —N/a |
| 2009 | Wild Grass | Alain Resnais | —N/a |
| 2010 | White Irish Drinkers | John Gray | —N/a |
| 2011 | The Hunters | Chris Briant | —N/a |
| 2012 | You Ain't Seen Nothin' Yet | Alain Resnais | —N/a |
| 2014 | Life of Riley | Alain Resnais | —N/a |
| 2020 | The New Mutants | Josh Boone | —N/a |
| 2026 | The X-Files: I Want to Believe – Vrach Frankenshteyn | Chris Carter | Posthumous release; final film as a composer, dedicated in memory |

=== Video games ===
| Year | Title | Notes |
|---|---|---|
| 1998 | Urban Assault | Composed with Sylvius Lack |
| 1998 | The X-Files Game | Composed with Paul Wayne Hiaumet |
| 2004 | Syphon Filter: The Omega Strain | Composed with Mike Reagan |
