= Carol Gino =

American author

- Born: Carol Ann Gino; November 2, 1941 (age 84); New York City
- Education: SUNY Farmingdale, SUNY Empire State College, Institute of Transpersonal Psychology
- Occupations: Author, Registered Nurse
- Partner: Mario Puzo (1979–1999)
- Children: 2
- Writing career
- Pen name: Terry Daniels
- Language: English
- Genres: Medical fiction, Semi-Autobiographical Fiction, Non-fiction, Memoir, Inspirational Fiction
- Website: carolgino.com

Carol Ann Gino (born November 2, 1941) is an American author, registered nurse, and educator recognized for her contributions to literature, nursing, and health advocacy.

She is best known for her novel, The Nurse's Story (1982), published by Simon & Schuster, a semi-autobiographical novel, written as medical fiction to protect the identities of the nurses and patients depicted. The book provides a candid portrayal of the challenges faced by nurses and patients, as well as the complexities of hospital life. The Nurse's Story became a bestseller and was serialized in the New York Daily News, Chicago Tribune, and The Washington Post. The novel also appeared on the Los Angeles Times and Publishers Weekly bestseller lists. Following its success, Gino was a featured guest on The Today Show, Charlie Rose, and Live with Regis, as well as being covered in People Magazine and New York Magazine, among other television, print, and radio media. In addition to her books, she has written articles for Newsday, The American Journal of Nursing, and Nursing.

Beyond her debut work, Gino has authored several other books, including Rusty's Story, a true story about a young woman diagnosed with Schizophrenia, when what she really had was Epilepsy. Rusty's Story, (1985), published by Bantam Books, won the Epilepsy Foundation of America's National Book Award and held its place in the New York Times best-seller list for multiple weeks.

Then an Angel Came (1997), published by Kensington Books, recounts how Gino's family coped with the loss of her grandson to SIDS. Amid their sorrow, they experienced an unexpected gift—angelic communication that offered them a deeper understanding of their spiritual connections to the baby, to each other, and to their greater purpose in the world.

Gino was the longtime companion of author Mario Puzo, and completed his final novel, The Family, at his request. The book was published posthumously by HarperCollins. Her memoir, Me & Mario: Love, Power & Writing with Mario Puzo, Author of The Godfather (2019), published by aaha! Books, examines their relationship and creative collaboration that lasted for two decades, until his death in 1999. Me & Mario received the 2019 Independent Publisher Book Award in the Autobiography/Memoir category.

Carol Gino's novels often draw from her experiences in the healthcare field, shedding light on overlooked medical realities and the resilience of individuals navigating challenging circumstances. Her works explore themes of health advocacy, hope, and the human spirit, grounded in true-to-life stories.

== Personal life ==
Gino was born in New York City and spent much of her life in Amityville, New York, on Long Island. She is the eldest of two daughters of Catherine Rita 'Kay' Macaroni, a first generation native New Yorker, and Octavius Adonis 'Thomas' Gino, an immigrant from Sardinia who introduced her to classic literature by reading the Harvard Classics to her after dinner, emphasizing the values of discipline, simplicity, and resilience, which had a lasting influence on her upbringing and later life.

Raised in a Roman Catholic, hard-working Italian immigrant family, Gino's childhood reflected the cultural norms of many Italian American households in mid-20th-century New York. She was inspired to pursue nursing by her grandmother, Catherine Vitale, an immigrant from Naples, Italy, who worked as a Nurse Midwife at Bellevue Hospital in the 1930s. Vitale was known for her independence as a divorcee, her women's suffragist activities, and her ability to drive a car and carry a firearm, which were uncommon for women of her time.

Gino began her nursing career at the age of 21, shortly after a separation that left her as a single mother with two children to support. She started as a nursing assistant before earning her Registered Practical Nurse (RPN) certification at SUNY Farmingdale. She later obtained her Bachelor of Science in nursing (BSN) and Registered Nurse (RN) credentials from SUNY Empire State College. In 1994, she earned a master's degree in Transpersonal Studies from the Institute of Transpersonal Psychology in Palo Alto, California, where she studied with Jean Houston.

In the fall of 1978, Gino worked as a private nurse for Erika Puzo, the wife of author Mario Puzo, during the final months of her battle with cancer. During this time, Gino developed a close relationship with Erika and the Puzo family, and after she died, Gino followed up with the family, as she had promised Erika. Mario expressed interest in reading her stories, and encouraged her to write a novel about her experiences in nursing. This marked the beginning of their personal and professional relationship, with Puzo later remarking that 'she saved me on the first night'.

== Publications ==
=== Works ===
- The Nurse's Story (1982)
- Rusty's Story (1986)
- Then, An Angel Came (1997)
- There's an Angel in my Computer (2011)
- The Yardsale of Life: The Eight Coats of Meaning (2014)
- Me & Mario: Love, Power & Writing with Mario Puzo, author of The Godfather (2018)

=== Completed by Carol Gino ===
- The Family (2001)
