= Michael Hunter (historian) =

British historian

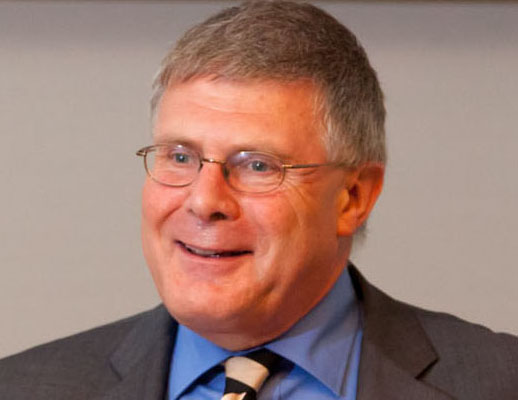
- Michael Hunter at the Neville Awards in 2009
- Born: Michael Cyril William Hunter; 1949 (age 76–77); Harting, West Sussex
- Education: Jesus College, Cambridge, Worcester College, Oxford
- Occupation: Historian
- Employer: Birkbeck, University of London
- Parent(s): Frank and Olive Hunter
- Awards: Roy G. Neville Prize

Michael Cyril William Hunter FBA FRHistS (born 1949) is emeritus professor of history in the department of history, classics and archaeology and a fellow of Birkbeck, University of London. Hunter is interested in the culture of early modern England. He specialises in the history of science in seventeenth- and early eighteenth-century England, particularly the work of Robert Boyle. In Noel Malcolm's judgement, Hunter "has done more for Boyle studies than anyone before him (or, one might almost say, than all previous Boyle scholars put together)".

== Education ==
Hunter read history at Jesus College, University of Cambridge, England from 1968 to 1972. He then attended Worcester College, Oxford, where he received a DPhil.

== Career ==
After a brief stay at the University of Reading Hunter joined Birkbeck, University of London in 1976.

Hunter's first monograph focused on the English antiquary and natural philosopher John Aubrey. Since then he has written extensively on the history of science and intellectual thought in England during the seventeenth and early eighteenth centuries, in particular the Royal Society.

His most substantial scholarly achievement is his edition of Boyle's Works (with Edward Davis, 14 vols, 1999–2000) and Correspondence (with Antonio Clericuzio and Lawrence Principe, 6 vols, 2001).

From 2006 to 2009 Hunter directed the creation of a digital library focusing on British printed images before 1700.

He received the 2011 Roy G. Neville Prize from the Chemical Heritage Foundation for his biographical work Boyle: Between God and Science. He also received the 2011 Robert Latham medal from the Samuel Pepys Club. In his honour, when he retired in 2013, the Birkbeck Early Modern Society held a conference on "Science, Magic and Religion in the Early Modern Period".

Hunter has been a wary defender of his turf, with scholars Steven Shapin and Simon Schaffer observing he has been "consistently hostile" to their more recent work on Robert Boyle.

== Personal life ==
Hunter is a motorcycle enthusiast who likes two-stroke racing bikes. He lives in Hastings, East Sussex.

== Works ==
Other academic books include:

- John Aubrey and the Realm of Learning. London: Duckworth, 1975. ISBN 978-0-71560-818-0
- Science and Society in Restoration England. Cambridge: Cambridge University Press, 1981. ISBN 0-521-22866-2
- The Royal Society and Its Fellows, 1660–1700: The Morphology of an Early Scientific Institution. BSHS monographs, 4. Chalfont St. Giles: British Society for the History of Science, 1982. ISBN 9780906450031
- Establishing the New Science: The Experience of the Early Royal Society. Woodbridge: Boydell Press, 1989. ISBN 978-0-85115-506-7
- (with David Wootton). Atheism from the Reformation to the Enlightenment. Oxford: Clarendon Press, 1992. ISBN 978-0-19-822736-6
- Robert Boyle Reconsidered. Cambridge: Cambridge University Press, 1994. ISBN 9780521442053
- Science and the Shape of Orthodoxy: Intellectual Change in Late Seventeenth-Century Britain. Woodbridge: Boydell Press, 1995. ISBN 978-0-85115-594-4
- Robert Boyle (1627–91): Scrupulosity and Science. Woodbridge: Boydell Press, 2000. ISBN 978-0-85115-798-6
- The Occult Laboratory: Magic, Science, and Second Sight in Late Seventeenth-Century Scotland. Woodbridge: Boydell Press, 2001. ISBN 978-1-4175-7606-7
- (with Edward Bradford Davis). The Boyle Papers: Understanding the Manuscripts of Robert Boyle. Aldershot: Ashgate, 2007. ISBN 9780754655688
- Editing Early Modern Texts: An Introduction to Principles and Practice. Basingstoke: Palgrave Macmillan, 2007. ISBN 978-0-230-00807-6
- Boyle : between God and Science, New Haven: Yale University Press, 2009. ISBN 978-0-300-12381-4
- The Image of Restoration Science : The Frontispiece to Thomas Sprat's History of the Royal Society (1667). London: Routledge, 2016. ISBN 978-1-317-02787-4
- The Decline of Magic. London: Yale University Press, 2020 ISBN 978-0-300-24358-1
