= Roy G. Neville Prize =

Award for biography in chemistry or molecular science

The Roy G. Neville Prize in Bibliography or Biography is a biennial award given by the Science History Institute (formerly the Chemical Heritage Foundation) to recognize a biographical work in the field of chemistry or molecular science. The Roy G. Neville Prize was established in 2006 and named to honor scientist and book collector Roy G. Neville. Neville founded Engineering and Technical Consultants, Redwood City, California, in 1973. He also assembled one of the world's largest collections of rare books in the field of science and technology. The Neville collection, including over 6,000 titles from the late 15th century to the early 20th century, was acquired by the Chemical Heritage Foundation (now the Science History Institute) in 2004.

== Recipients ==
The following people have received the Neville Award:

- 2019 Helge Kragh, for Julius Thomsen: A Life in Chemistry and Beyond
- 2017 John C. Powers, for Inventing Chemistry: Herman Boerhaave and the Reform of the Chemical Arts
- 2016 Melvyn Usselman, for Pure Intelligence: The Life of William Hyde Wollaston
- 2013 Mary Jo Nye, for Michael Polanyi and His Generation: Origins of the Social Construction of Science
- 2011 Michael Hunter, for Boyle: Between God and Science
- 2009 William Hodson Brock, for William Crookes (1832–1919) and the Commercialization of Science
- 2007 Michael D. Gordin, for A Well-Ordered Thing: Dmitrii Mendeleev and the Shadow of the Periodic Table
- 2006 Robert E. Schofield, for The Enlightened Joseph Priestley: A Study of His Life and Works from 1773 to 1804

== See also ==
- List of history awards
- List of chemistry awards
- List of prizes named after people
