= Honkytonk Man =

1982 film by Clint Eastwood

- Theatrical release poster
- Directed by: Clint Eastwood
- Screenplay by: Clancy Carlile
- Based on: Honkytonk Man by Clancy Carlile
- Produced by: Clint Eastwood
- Starring: Clint Eastwood; Kyle Eastwood
- Cinematography: Bruce Surtees
- Edited by: Ferris Webster; Michael Kelly; Joel Cox
- Music by: Steve Dorff
- Production company: The Malpaso Company
- Distributed by: Warner Bros.
- Release date: December 15, 1982
- Running time: 123 minutes
- Country: United States
- Language: English
- Budget: $2 million
- Box office: $4.5 million

Honkytonk Man is a 1982 American musical Western comedy-drama film set in the Great Depression. Clint Eastwood, who produced and directed, stars with his son, Kyle Eastwood. Clancy Carlile's screenplay is based on his 1980 novel of the same name. This was the last film appearance for Marty Robbins, who died one week before the release of the film. The story of Clint's character, Red Stovall, is loosely based on the life of Jimmie Rodgers.

== Plot ==
Itinerant Western singer Red Stovall suffers from tuberculosis, but has been given an opportunity to make it big at the Grand Ole Opry in Nashville, Tennessee. He is accompanied by his young nephew, Whit. After a series of adventures that include Whit's first sexual encounter in a brothel, they finally arrive.

While a fit of coughing in his audition ruins Red's chances, talent scouts for a record company are impressed enough to arrange a recording session, realizing that he has only days to live. The tuberculosis reaches a critical stage in the middle of this session, where Red's lines are filled in by Smokey, a side guitarist. Red eventually succumbs, while Whit vows to tell his uncle's story. Red's vintage Lincoln Model K touring car, prevalent throughout the movie, finally "dies" at the cemetery where Red is laid to rest.

== Cast ==
- Clint Eastwood as Red Stovall
- Kyle Eastwood as Whit Wagoneer
- John McIntire as Grandpa Wagoneer
- Alexa Kenin as Marlene "Moonglow" Mooney
- Verna Bloom as Emmy Wagoneer
- Matt Clark as Virgil Wagoneer
- Barry Corbin as Derwood Arnspriger
- Jerry Hardin as Snuffy
- Tim Thomerson as Highway Patrolman
- Charles Cyphers as Stubbs
- Porter Wagoner as Dusty
- Macon McCalman as Dr. Hines
- Joe Regalbuto as Henry Axle
- Gary Grubbs as Jim Bob
- Marty Robbins as Smokey
- Tracey Walter as Pooch

== Production ==
Filming took place over five weeks on location. The first part of the movie was filmed in Bird's Landing, California, but the majority of this feature was filmed in and around Calaveras County, east of Stockton, California. Exterior scenes include Main Street in Mountain Ranch and Main Street and the Pioneer Hotel in Sheep Ranch.

The famous jail break scene was filmed in Dayton, Nevada, at the corner of Pike Street (the Lincoln Highway) and W Main Street. The vintage brick building to which the movie-built jail was attached is the Odeon Hall, where Marilyn Monroe's paddleball and bar interior scenes were shot in The Misfits (1961). Extras were locally hired and many of the town's residents are seen in the movie.

== Reception ==
Honkytonk Man received critical acclaim and has a score of 93% with a mean of 7.4 of a possible 10 on Rotten Tomatoes. The New York Post wrote, "The pace is slow, very country, but it rises to touching moments...not all perfect by any means, but ultimately a story of occasional awkward truths." Roger Ebert gave the film three stars out of four, writing, "This is a sweet, whimsical, low-key movie, a movie that makes you feel good without pressing you too hard."

The film opened Wednesday, December 15, 1982, in Los Angeles before expanding to 677 screens for the weekend, but only grossed $667,727, the worst opening for an Eastwood film. The film went on to gross $4.5 million at the United States and Canada box office, Eastwood's lowest grosser for more than a decade. The film was nominated for a Golden Raspberry Award for Worst Original Song for "No Sweeter Cheater than You" at the 3rd Golden Raspberry Awards.

== Bibliography ==
- Hughes, Howard (2009). Aim for the Heart. London: I.B. Tauris. ISBN 978-1-84511-902-7.
- Thompson, David (1999). "Cop on a Hot Tightrope". In Robert E., Kapsis; Coblentz, Kathie (eds.). Clint Eastwood: Interviews. University Press of Mississippi. pp. 81–95. ISBN 1-57806-070-2.
