= Mistress (1987 film) =

- Genre: Drama
- Written by: Joyce Eliason
- Directed by: Michael Tuchner
- Starring: Victoria Principal
- Music by: Michael Convertino
- Country of origin: United States
- Original language: English

Production
- Executive producers: Richard Fischoff; Sherry Lansing
- Producer: Stephanie Austin
- Cinematography: Kees Van Oostrum
- Editor: David Campling
- Running time: 100 min.
- Production companies: Jaffe-Lansing; Republic Television

Original release
- Network: CBS
- Release: October 4, 1987

Mistress is a 1987 television film written by Joyce Eliason and starring Victoria Principal as Rae Colton, a beautiful woman in her middle thirties who is having an affair with a rich, married man named Wyn Brooks (Don Murray).

== Plot ==
Rae Colton had come to Hollywood to be an actress, but her career never took off. She meets and falls in love with Wyn, an older and wealthy married businessman.

The relationship with Wyn carries on for nine years, and while he takes care of her financially, she hopes that one day they can marry and possibly have a child. With much time on her hands due to Wyn's support, Rae fills her life with acting lessons and her friendship with Margo, another aspiring actress. Their friend Stephanie did make it as an actress and even has her own television show. While Rae aspires to get to that level, she becomes somewhat complacent over time, not having any immediate financial worries because of her seemingly comfortable situation, as Wyn has provided her with a home and vehicle.

Rae's world is shattered when Wyn dies suddenly of a heart attack in his sleep while on a trip to the Bahamas with her. Rae finds out that Wyn's wife has taken over his company, and as everything she had was legally in his name, she has no deed to her home or title to her car. Wyn also had no will, thus everything he owned now belongs to his wife, leaving Rae all but destitute.

With little money and almost no options, Rae moves into a house that is listed for sale by Margo's friend. But the house quickly sells, forcing Rae out. She returns home to Utah to visit her mother, Deanie, and begins a relationship with Burke Johnson, a former high school classmate who has always been in love with her. Rae's mother is deeply disappointed in her for seeing Burke, and tells her to go back to Hollywood and try again to make it as an actress. Rae pleads with her mother to understand that she will never make it big in Hollywood, but eventually bows to pressure and decides to go back.

Rae returns to Los Angeles and takes Stephanie up on her offer to stay in her guest house. Rae calls Burke and asks him to meet her in Las Vegas, where she hopes to convince him to resume their relationship in California, away from her mother's influence. He reluctantly agrees, but then doesn't show up.

Rae returns to Los Angeles, lonelier than before. She turns to drinking to ease the pain of her shattered life, and tries working in a department store with little success. Rae meets two German businessmen in a club when she is out with Margo and, having too much to drink, sleeps with one of them. She is shocked and hurt when he mistakes her for a prostitute.

Rae realizes she has to survive somehow, and will likely never become more than a 'kept' woman. She asks Margo if she can introduce her to any available men. She meets Ben Wasburn, and makes an agreement to become his mistress. However, it turns out to be a situation far less romantic than what she had with Wyn. She beats Ben in a game of pool and he sends her a black mink coat as a present.

As the movie ends, Rae and Margo are admiring the coat in the mirror and Rae recounts a time when she was young and driving in the woods in Utah with her father. She tells Margo that the two of them came across a deer that had gotten trapped in barbed wire and had died. According to Rae, her father explained to her that deer have an ability to die when trapped. That their hearts simply just explode.

A wistful Rae gazes at her image in the mirror. Without looking at Margo, she says "You know what I wish? I wish I was a deer," alluding to own feeling of entrapment and no other way out, as the movie ends here.

== Cast ==
- Victoria Principal as Rae Colton
- Don Murray as Wyn
- Kerrie Keane as Margo
- Joanna Kerns as Stephanie
- Grace Zabriskie as Deanie
- Guy Boyd as Burke Johnson
- Alan Rachins as Ben Washburn
