= Ruby Cairo =

1992 film by Graeme Clifford

Ruby Cairo (aka Deception)
- Spanish theatrical release poster
- Directed by: Graeme Clifford
- Written by: Robert Dillon; Michael Thomas
- Produced by: Haruki Kadokawa; Lloyd Phillips; Hiroshi Sugawara
- Starring: Andie MacDowell; Liam Neeson; Viggo Mortensen; Jack Thompson
- Cinematography: László Kovács
- Edited by: Caroline Biggerstaff; Paul Rubell; Mark Winitsky
- Music by: John Barry
- Production companies: Majestic Films International; Kadokawa Productions
- Distributed by: Miramax Films
- Release dates: December 12, 1992 (Japan); October 29, 1993 (United States)
- Running time: 90 minutes
- Countries: Japan; United States
- Language: English
- Budget: $24 million
- Box office: $608,866 (USA)

Ruby Cairo, also known as Deception, is a 1992 drama thriller film directed by Graeme Clifford. It stars Andie MacDowell, Liam Neeson and Viggo Mortensen.

== Plot ==
When Bessie Faro's husband Johnny dies in a plane crash in Veracruz, Mexico, she finds that his air cargo business is deeply in the red. When she visits the airline's terminal in Veracruz, she finds a packet of baseball cards that have been marked up by Johnny. Recognizing his system for marking betting slips at race tracks, she decodes the cards and realizes that they indicate a bank account. When she tries to withdraw money from the account, she is denied. She realizes that the account is in the name of the player on the card, Onix Concepción.

Back home, Bessie uses an International bank directory at the local library to decode Manny Sanguillén's Pittsburgh Pirates' card to find another bank account in Panama. She obtains durable power of attorney and begins a whirlwind trek to recover her husband's money. After Panama, she visits the Bahamas and the Cayman Islands, recovering tens of thousands of dollars from each account. In Germany, she closes Don Mueller's account from Berliner Bank, but the cashier hands her only 750 DM. He explains that 74,000DM worth of cashier's checks have been paid out to a company called EDK Technik in the former East Berlin. At EDK Technik, a manager informs Bessie that they make ink for ball point pens.

Bessie leaves the office confused as to why Johnny would be buying so much ink. The manager waits for her to leave and then ushers in some men who have been following Bessie on her journey. Her next stop is Athens, where she finds out that Johnny's account has already been closed. The teller takes Bessie to a safe deposit box which only contains a Bill Mazeroski card. Bessie's growing suspicion that Johnny is alive is confirmed by the sight of the card. When the teller sees how distraught Bessie is, she confides in her that a local shipping company cashed out some of Johnny's money and that the rest was wired to Cairo.

She visits Kolatos Shipping Company and finds that one of their boats is headed to Cairo with grain for a food aid effort. She rides with the cargo to Egypt, and notices that one of the dock workers is being stained green by a bag of grain. She sneaks onto the truck where he loaded the bag, opens it, and finds, hidden beneath the grain, containers of thionyl chloride manufactured by EDK Technik.

Bessie soon befriends the coordinator of the relief effort, Fergus Lamb. She explains what she found in the bag, and Fergus confronts his Operations Manager, who reveals that he allowed the smuggling to finance the grain shipments. Fergus is irate because he knows that the thionyl chloride is being used to manufacture chemical weapons.

Fergus and Bessie quickly fall in love, but she continues her journey, now intent on actually finding Johnny. A local Immigration Agent teams up with Bessie and helps her find Johnny. He admits to Bessie that he had been skimming from the chemical weapons traders, which is why he had to disappear. When Bessie leaves, Johnny runs after her and tries to make her stay with him, holding her at gunpoint in a crowded square. The men who have been following Bessie throughout the film now have Johnny in sight, and they immediately kill him.

The film ends with Bessie happily back at home with her family, just as Fergus arrives to reunite with her.

== Cast ==
- Andie MacDowell as Elizabeth "Bessie" Faro/Ruby Cairo
- Liam Neeson as Dr. Fergus Lamb, Feed the World
- Viggo Mortensen as John E. "Johnny" Faro
  - Paul Spencer as young Johnny Faro
- Jack Thompson as Ed, Feed the World Foundation Manager
- Amy Van Nostrand as Marge Swimmer and Faro Neighbor
- Pedro Gonzalez Gonzalez as Uncle Jorge
- Chad Power as Niles Faro
- Olympia Dukakis as Woman at Hotel (uncredited)

== Production ==
Production on Ruby Cairo began as early as 1989, when director Graeme Clifford and screenwriter Robert Dillon traveled to Egypt to research locations for the project, with the script's subject matter and locations approved by the country's Ministry of Antiquities and Ministry of Culture. By July 1991, Clifford and producer Lloyd Philips had begun scouting locations in Egypt.

Principal photography began on August 5, 1991, with production taking place in Los Angeles, Veracruz, Berlin, Athens, and Cairo. Actress Olympia Dukakis was hired for scenes taking place in Veracruz, but most of her scenes were cut and appears unbilled. The film was said to be budgeted at $40 million, $2 million of which was to be spent in Egypt; the budget was ultimately shrunk to $24 million instead. According to Andie MacDowell, Clifford was stoned throughout filming.

Complications arose when film equipment was detained in Alexandria, which resulted in unexpected paperwork and fees to secure their return. Despite the approval of the Egyptian ministries, the unnamed on-set censor vehemently opposed numerous costumes, locations, and background actors within scenes that could potentially misrepresent the city and its people, and reportedly covered the camera lens with her hand. Censorship board officials, displeased by the selection of "shabby" locations, closed the set and confiscated 22 cans of exposed film negative, which were finally returned after a month of negotiations with the Egyptian Department of Antiquities; at that time, filmmakers were also attempting to regain withheld bond money. The censorship issue was eventually resolved and filming resumed on October 27, 1991, with the remainder of permissions being granted on a day-by-day, scene-by-scene basis.

New York Times and Los Angeles Times articles published between November and December 1991 describe an extended version of a scene in which the character Fergus Lamb, played by Liam Neeson, hits a golf ball from the top of the Great Pyramid of Giza into the swimming pool of the Mena House Hotel 800 yards away. Production designer Richard Sylbert was forced to duplicate the pyramid in Los Angeles due to the rapidly-changing desert sunlight and access restrictions to the actual monument. For the backdrop, photographers from Pacific Studios in Hollywood, Los Angeles, created a 27-foot tall, 100-foot wide Chromatrans image of the Cairo skyline. To capture the correct lighting, members of the film crew, led by an uncredited Richard Lund, gained permission to climb the pyramid with five cameras. Sleeping next to the equipment, they awoke to take five photographs at 7:30 a.m. the next morning, just one hour after sunrise. Once the images were edited together, the perspective was enhanced by resizing the swimming pool. Despite the extensive efforts for the shot, however, it is not included in the final film.

== Soundtrack ==
The soundtrack features music by John Barry, the theme song The Secrets of My Heart with lyric by Cynthia Haagens and Graeme Clifford, and the song You Belong to Me performed by Patsy Cline.

== Release ==
In November 1991, 20th Century Fox had reportedly acquired U.S. distribution rights to the film, but the deal had collapsed by the following year, forcing the filmmakers to find another distributor. Miramax Films ultimately acquired the film, retitling it Deception and releasing it on October 29, 1993 in Los Angeles, followed by New York City on December 3. The film fared poorly at the box office, grossing only $608,866 in the United States.

=== Home video ===
The film was retitled Deception when it was recut and released on video with 21 additional minutes of footage. Echo Bridge Entertainment released the film on DVD on April 26, 2011. The film debuted on Blu-ray on September 11, 2012, in a double feature with Ethan Frome (1993). Neither film has extras on the disc.
