= Paret =

Paret (Eastern Catalan: [pəˈɾɛt]) is a surname of Catalan origin, and may refer to:

- Aurélien Paret-Peintre (born 1996), French cyclist, brother of Valentin
- Benny Paret (1937–1962), Cuban welterweight boxer
- Eduardo Paret (born 1972), Cuban baseball player
- Emmanuel Fritz Paret (born 1989), Haitian-American entrepreneur
- Henri Paret (cyclist, born 1854), French cyclist who rode in the 1904 Tour de France
- Henri Paret (cyclist, born 1929), French cyclist who rode in the 1952 and 1953 Tour de France
- Jahial Parmly Paret (1870–1952), known professionally as J. Parmly Paret, American tennis player and author
- Luis Paret y Alcázar (1746–1799), Spanish painter of the late-Baroque or Rococo period
- Peter Paret (1924–2020), American military, cultural and art historian with a particular interest in German history
- Valentin Paret-Peintre (born 2001), French cyclist

== See also ==
- Pareto (disambiguation)
- Peret
