= Helge Kragh =

Danish historian of science (born 1944)

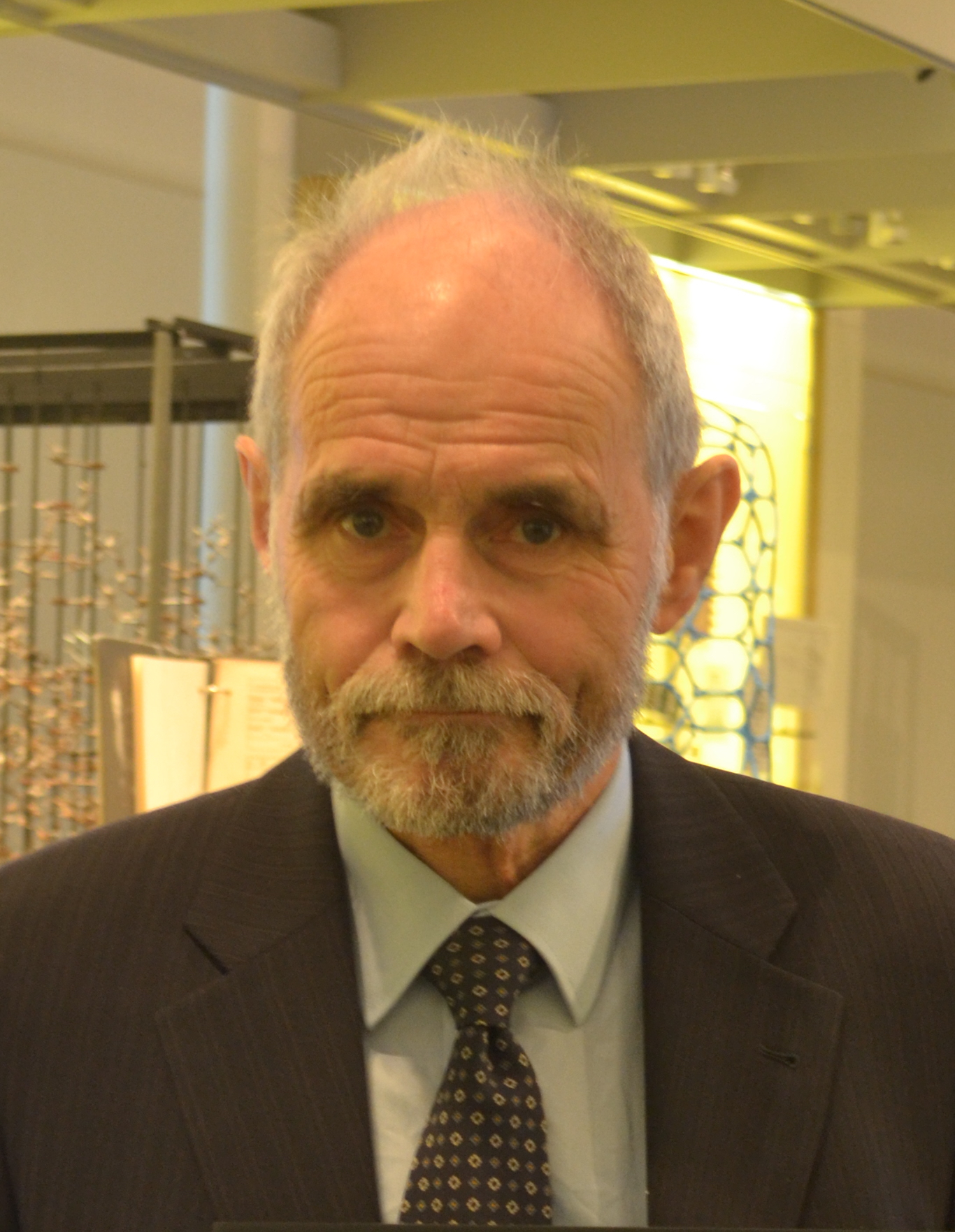
- Helge Kragh, 2019
- Born: 13 February 1944 (age 82)
- Education: University of Copenhagen, Roskilde University
- Known for: History of cosmology, relativity, quantum mechanics
- Awards: Abraham Pais Prize for History of Physics (2019)
- Scientific career
- Fields: Science historian
- Workplaces: Aarhus University, Denmark

Helge Stjernholm Kragh (born February 13, 1944) is a Danish historian of science who focuses on the development of 19th century physics, chemistry, and astronomy. His published work includes biographies of Paul Dirac, Julius Thomsen and Ludvig Lorenz, and The Oxford Handbook of the History of Modern Cosmology (2019) which he co-edited with Malcolm Longair.

== Biography ==
Kragh studied physics and chemistry at the University of Copenhagen, graduating with a degree in 1970. He earned his Ph.D. in physics in 1981 at the University of Roskilde. He received a second doctorate, in philosophy, from the University of Aarhus in 2007.

Kragh was an associate professor of history of science at Cornell University from 1987 to 1989, a professor at the University of Oslo from 1995 to 1997, and a professor at Aarhus University in Denmark from 1997 to 2015.

As of 2015 he retired, becoming emeritus professor at the Niels Bohr Institute at the University of Copenhagen. He is also a professor emeritus at the Centre for Science Studies of Aarhus University.

Kragh's areas of study are the history of physics from the mid-19th century onward, the history of astronomy, the history of cosmology and the history of chemistry. He is known for his work on the history of the periodic system, early quantum atomic models, speculative cosmology and the northern lights.

== Honors and awards ==
- 2025, Società Italiana di Fisica (SIF) prize "for his remarkable and recognised contributions to the history of 20th century physics, especially regarding the historical development of relativity and quantum mechanics"
- 2019, Roy G. Neville Prize for Julius Thomsen: A Life in Chemistry and Beyond (2016), Science History Institute
- 2019, Abraham Pais Prize for History of Physics, American Physical Society (APS)
- President, European Society for the History of Science 2008–2010
- Member, Académie Internationale d'Histoire des Sciences (corresponding member since 1995, full member since 2005)
- Member, Royal Danish Academy of Sciences and Letters

== Selected writings ==
- Kragh, Helge (1992). Dirac: a scientific biography. Cambridge: Cambridge Univ. Press. ISBN 978-0-521-38089-8.
- Kragh, Helge (1996). Cosmology and controversy: the historical development of two theories of the universe. Princeton, NJ: Princeton University Press. ISBN 978-0-691-02623-7.
- Kragh, Helge (2002). Quantum generations: a history of physics in the twentieth century. Princeton, NJ Chichester: Princeton University Press. ISBN 978-0-691-01206-3.
- Kragh, Helge (2003). An introduction to the historiography of science. Cambridge: Cambridge University Press. ISBN 978-0-521-38921-1.
- Kragh, Helge (2004). Matter and spirit in the universe: scientific and religious preludes to modern cosmology. London : Singapore; Hackensack, NJ: Imperial College Press; Distributed by World Scientific Pub. ISBN 978-1-86094-485-7. OCLC 57706081.
- Kragh, Helge (2007). Conceptions of cosmos: from myths to the accelerating universe. New York: Oxford University press. ISBN 978-0-19-920916-3.
- Kragh, Helge (2008). The moon that wasn't: the saga of Venus' spurious satellite. Basel: Birkhäuser. ISBN 978-3-7643-8908-6.
- Kragh, Helge (2008). Entropic creation: religious contexts of thermodynamics and cosmology. Aldershot: Ashgate. ISBN 978-0-7546-6414-7.
- Kragh, Helge S.; Overduin, James (2014). The Weight of the Vacuum: A Scientific History of Dark Energy. Heidelberg: Springer. ISBN 978-3-642-55089-8.
- Kragh, Helge (2014). Higher Speculation: Grand Theories and Failed Revolutions in Physics and Cosmologys. Oxford: Oxford University Press, USA. ISBN 978-0-19-872637-1.
- Kragh, Helge (2015). Masters of the universe: conversations with cosmologists of the past. Oxford: Oxford university press. ISBN 978-0-19-872289-2.
- Kragh, Helge (2016). Julius Thomsen: A Life in Chemistry and Beyond. København: Nord Academic. ISBN 978-87-7304-401-8.
- Varying gravity: dirac's legacy in cosmology and geophysics. New York, NY: Springer Berlin Heidelberg. 2016. ISBN 978-3-319-24377-1.
- Kragh, Helge (2018). Ludvig Lorenz: A Nineteenth-Century Theoretical Physicist. København: Nord Academic. ISBN 978-87-7304-417-9.
- Kragh, Helge (2020). Den sære historie om Venus' måne (in Danish). Lindhardt og Ringhof. ISBN 978-87-11-98400-0.
- Knight, David; Kragh, Helge, eds. (1998). The making of the chemist: the social history of chemistry in Europe, 1789-1914. Cambridge, UK; New York: Cambridge University Press. ISBN 978-0-521-58351-0.
- Hvidtfeldt-Nielsen, Kristian; Kjaergaard, Peter; Kragh, Helge; Nielsen, Henry, eds. (2008). Science in Denmark: a thousand-year history. Aarhus: Aarhus University Press. ISBN 978-87-7934-317-7.
- Kragh, Helge; Longair, Malcolm S., eds. (2019). The Oxford handbook of the history of modern cosmology. New York: Oxford university press. ISBN 978-0-19-881766-6.
- Max Weinstein: Physics, Philosophy, Pandeism, History and Philosophy of Physics, 2019
- Foreword, Max B. Weinstein, World and Life Views, Emerging From Religion, Philosophy and Perception of Nature, trans. Deborah Moss, 2021
- List of Kragh's publications up to 2015 at Aarhus University

Professional and academic associations
Preceded by Eberhard Knobloch	President of the European Society for the History of Science; 2008–2010	Succeeded by Sona Strbanova (cs:Soňa Štrbáňová)
