= Mosca =

Mosca may refer to:

== Places ==
- Italian name of Moscow
- Mosca, Colorado, United States
- Mosca Pass, mountain pass in Alamosa County in the Rocky Mountains of Colorado in the United States
- Ponte Mosca, historic bridge in Turin, region of Piedmont, Italy

== Other uses ==
- Mosca's, a restaurant near New Orleans in Avondale, Louisiana, United States
- Mosca-Bystritsky MBbis, fighter aircraft developed and used by the Imperial Russian Air Service during the First World War
- Polikarpov I-16, referred to by republicans during the Spanish Civil War as moscas (flies)
- Mosca (surname)
- Mosca of Montelepre, an antagonist in The Godfather III
- Christian "Mosca" Gomez, one of the main characters of children's telenovela Chiquititas
