= A Loss of Innocence =

- Genre: Romantic drama
- Based on: On This Star by Virginia Sorensen
- Teleplay by: Joyce Eliason
- Directed by: Graeme Clifford
- Starring: Jennie Garth; Rob Estes; Mike Doyle
- Theme music composer: Mark Snow
- Country of origin: United States
- Original language: English

Production
- Executive producers: Joyce Eliason; Frank Konigsberg; Larry Sanitsky
- Producer: James T. Davis
- Cinematography: Gordon C. Lonsdale
- Editor: Kimberly Ray
- Running time: 91 minutes

Original release
- Network: ABC
- Release: September 29, 1996

A Loss of Innocence (also known as The End of Eden) is a 1996 American romantic drama television film that first aired on September 29, 1996, on the ABC television network. It is based on the novel On This Star by Virginia Sorensen.

== Plot ==
In the 1920s, a successful New York pianist returns to his hometown of Templeton, a Mormon community in rural Utah. After he arrives, Erik Eriksen is treated distrustfully by the community members, including his family, for having "betrayed" them by not living his life according to their faith. Only his mother and his younger half-brother, Jens, support him unconditionally. However, trouble arises when Erik falls in love with Chelnicia. "Chel" is a beautiful young woman who not only plays the piano and is a dedicated Mormon, but also happens to be Jens's fiancée.

== Cast ==
- Jennie Garth as Chelnicia "Chel" Bowen
- Rob Estes as Erik Eriksen
- Polly Holliday as Christina Eriksen
- Mike Doyle as Jens Eriksen
- Michael Milhoan as Ivor Eriksen
- Anne Sward as Ida Eriksen
- Scott Wilkinson as John Brown
- Marcia Dangerfield as Seenie
- Melissa Moore as Esther Bowen-Dorius
- Maria Mejias as Ruby Snow
- Bill Osborn as Oley Eriksen
- Peter Morse as Junior Eriksen
- Wendy Lee Richhart as Hedvig Eriksen
- Jed Knudsen as Karl Dorius
- Steve Anderson as Bill Mac
- Beverly Rowland as Woman on Train
- Reb Fleming as Seamstress
- Mary Pederson as Verla May
- Danny Rees as Justice of the Peace
- Allan Groves as Andy
- Dennis Saylor as Jake

== Production ==
The film was shot mostly in Heber Valley, Utah.

== Reception ==
Writing for Deseret News, Scott D. Pierce reviewed the film. He criticized its plot as predictable, saying that "the movie telegraphs its every move well in advance". Pierce also found fault with Garth's acting: "Why either brother is interested is somewhat of a mystery. As portrayed by Garth, Chel comes off as sort of a simple-minded fool." Conversely, he praised the film's overall feel, saying "Loss looks great - and not just the Utah scenery", adding that the period costumes bring "an air of authenticity to a movie that, unfortunately, is sometimes as foolish as it is predictable." Pierce summed up the film with the rhetorical question: "What if Danielle Steel had set one of her romance novels in 1920s Utah and used the LDS Church as a backdrop?" He ultimately concluded that "Loss is, in the end, a predictable romance novel brought to TV. It's difficult to take it any more seriously than that."
