= The Family (Puzo novel) =

Novel by Mario Puzo

- First edition cover
- Author: Mario Puzo compl. by Carol Gino
- Language: English
- Genre: Historical novel
- Publisher: ReganBooks
- Publication date: October 2001
- Publication place: United States
- Media type: Print (hardback & paperback)
- Pages: 304 pp (hardback edition) & 432 pp (paperback edition)
- ISBN: 0-06-039445-5 (hardback edition) & ISBN 0-06-103242-5 (paperback edition)
- OCLC: 46951655
- Dewey Decimal: 813/.54 21
- LC Class: PS3566.U9 F36 2001

The Family is a 2001 novel written by Mario Puzo. The novel is about Pope Alexander VI and his family. Puzo spent over twenty years working on the book off and on, while he wrote others. The novel was finished by his longtime girlfriend, Carol Gino. The Family is effectively his last novel, but released two years after his death.

== Plot introduction ==
Many of its characters were real people, including Niccolò Machiavelli, Duarte Brandão and members of the Borgia family.

== Summary ==
Pope Alexander VI (formerly Rodrigo Borgia) believes God will ultimately forgive his many sins simply because, as pope, he is infallible. The Family focuses on this cunning, ambitious despot and his children—the ruthless Cesare and the beautiful but wicked Lucrezia.

A passionate love story runs through the novel, but it is a sinful one. Lucrezia lost her virginity to her brother Cesare when she was only thirteen, and the two have loved only each other ever since. Alexander marries Lucrezia off three times for political reasons, to Giovanni Sforza (Lord of Pesaro), Alfonso of Aragon (Duke of Bisceglie), and finally Alfonso I d'Este (Duke of Ferrara). She remains submissive to her father, if not to her many husbands and lovers. Her final marriage, to Alfonso d'Este, was a success, though neither partner was faithful: she bore her third husband a number of children and proved to be a respectable and accomplished duchess, effectively rising above her previous reputation and surviving the fall of the Borgias following her father's death.

Pope Alexander aims to unify Italy's feudal states under papal rule. Cesare, who exchanges his cardinal's miter for a warrior's helmet to become commander-in-chief of his father's armies, carries out conquest after conquest to fulfill Alexander's grandiose ambitions. As in Puzo's The Godfather, the lovemaking, the opulent festivities, the sub rosa plotting, and the complex double-dealing are interspersed with outbursts of violence, including one memorable scene in which the reformist priest Girolamo Savonarola is torn apart on the Rack.
