= Joyce Eliason =

American TV writer and producer (1934–2022)

- Born: May 14, 1934; Manti, Utah, U.S.
- Died: January 10, 2022 (aged 87)
- Occupation(s): Screenwriter, television producer
- Children: 2

Joyce Eliason (May 14, 1934 – January 10, 2022) was an American television writer and producer. She was best known for writing TV miniseries including Titanic and The Last Don, and for the TV film The Jacksons: An American Dream. Eliason was one of the writers for the hit television series Love, American Style and wrote her first screenplay Tell Me a Riddle in 1980.

== Life ==
Eliason was born in Manti, Utah on May 14, 1934. She worked for TV Guide in Salt Lake City before moving to Hollywood at age 30 with aspirations of becoming an actress. Her career in acting was unsuccessful, but she was able to find work as a writer. Her first writing credit came in 1972 for the anthology comedy series Love, American Style. Through the 1980s and 1990s, Eliason wrote for and produced numerous films, television shows and miniseries.

Eliason wrote two books, Fresh Meat/Warm Weather in 1974 and Laid Out in 1976.

Eliason had two children, Polly and Jill Eliason. She died on January 10, 2022, at the age of 87, after a brief illness.

== Selected filmography ==
Eliason was principally a writer, but she also frequently served as a producer on films which she has written. A partial filmography is shown below.

=== Writer ===
- 1969 Love, American Style (TV series, some episodes)
- 1980 Tell Me a Riddle (movie)
- 1981 Child Bride of Short Creek (TV movie)
- 1985 Surviving: A Family in Crisis (TV movie)
- 1985 Right to Kill? (TV movie)
- 1987 Mistress (TV movie)
- 1988 Elvis and Me (TV movie)
- 1989 Small Sacrifices (TV movie)
- 1992 The Jacksons: An American Dream (TV miniseries)
- 1994 Shadows of Desire (TV movie)
- 1994 Oldest Living Confederate Widow Tells All (TV miniseries)
- 1995 Children of the Dust (TV miniseries)
- 1996 Sweet Temptation (TV movie)
- 1996 Titanic (TV miniseries)
- 1996 A Loss of Innocence (TV movie)
- 1997 The Last Don (TV miniseries)
- 2001 Amy & Isabelle (TV movie)
- 2001 Blonde (TV movie)
- 2002 We Were the Mulvaneys (TV movie)
- 2003 Blessings (TV movie)
- 2004 Gracie's Choice (TV movie)
- 2005 Riding the Bus with My Sister (TV movie)
- 2009 America (TV movie)

=== Producer ===
- 1992 The Jacksons: An American Dream (TV movie) (producer)
- 1994 Shadows of Desire (TV movie) (executive producer)
- 1994 Oldest Living Confederate Widow Tells All (TV miniseries, supervising producer)
- 1995 Children of the Dust (TV miniseries) (executive producer)
- 1996 A Loss of Innocence (TV movie) (executive producer)
- 1996 Sweet Temptation (TV movie) (executive producer)
- 1997 The Last Don (TV miniseries) (executive producer, some episodes)
- 1998 The Last Don II (TV miniseries) (executive producer, some episodes)
- 2001 Mulholland Drive (co-producer)
