= The Dark Arena =

1955 novel by Mario Puzo

- U.S. first edition cover
- Author: Mario Puzo
- Language: English
- Subject: Crime novel
- Publisher: Random House
- Publication date: 1955
- Publication place: United States
- Media type: Print
- Pages: 283
- OCLC: 46968806

The Dark Arena is the first novel by Mario Puzo, published in 1955.

== Plot ==
The book follows Walter Mosca, an American World War II veteran who returns to Germany for his girlfriend, Hella. The novel explores life in post-war Germany, a place where the standard currency is not the German mark, or even the U.S. dollar, but U.S.-made cigarettes.

== Reception ==
The novel garnered positive reviews. The Boston Globe: "Fierce, intense, compelling." The Nation: "One of the finest works of fiction to come out of this country's occupation of Germany." The San Francisco Chronicle: "Puzo tells his story brutally, violently, and undoubtedly all very much as it all might have been."

The novel was not as commercially successful as his later works such as the 1969 blockbuster The Godfather. In the 1972 collection The Godfather Papers and Other Confessions, Puzo stated that he made $3,500 from the book. The reviewers gave it modest acclaim, and admitted that Puzo had "solid talent."
