= Sweet Temptation (film) =

- Genre: Drama
- Written by: Joyce Eliason
- Directed by: Ron Lagomarsino
- Starring: Beverly D'Angelo; Jenny Lewis; Meadow Sisto; Rob Estes
- Theme music composer: Mark Snow
- Country of origin: United States
- Original language: English

Production
- Executive producers: Joyce Eliason; Frank Konigsberg
- Producer: Jack Clements
- Cinematography: Eagle Egilsson
- Editor: Elba Sanchez-Short
- Running time: 96 min.
- Production company: The Königsberg Company

Original release
- Network: CBS
- Release: March 6, 1996

Sweet Temptation is a 1996 made-for-television drama film written by Joyce Eliason, directed by Ron Lagomarsino, and starring Beverly D'Angelo, Jenny Lewis, and Rob Estes.

== Plot ==
Divorcée Jesse Larson lives in Los Angeles, California with her sixteen-year-old daughter Jade. She owns and operates an Italian catering company entitled Boccone Dolce (Sweet Mouthful). Jade makes the daily runs to local cafés in the area, one of which belongs to her mother's live-in boyfriend Billy Stone. Later that evening, Jade and Billy roughhouse with each other in Jesse's bed. Jesse enters the room and dismisses Jade back to her own room, disapproving of Jade's sleepwear. Jesse is further peeved when she finds out Billy was naked the entire time Jade sat next to him in bed. Billy proposes marriage to Jesse though she declines favoring her sense of freedom and waiting for the situation to be right for Jade.

The following night, when Jesse is preparing for a dinner date with Billy, Jade asks if she can tag along. Jesse allows her to do so and the trio dine at an upscale restaurant where their Italian waiter Mario recognizes Jesse from formally working at Boccone Dolce. Jesse promptly flirts with him, causing Billy to become jealous and argue with her. When they return home, Jade, obviously displeased from the night's turn of events, heads straight to bed. But not before an intoxicated Jesse stumbles into her bedroom informing her that it's fun to be in love and advises Jade that she should meet more people in order to experience having a boyfriend of her own.

The next evening, when Jesse is assisting Jade in straightening her bedroom, she uncovers a pack of cigarettes. When Jade lies about the cigarettes, Jesse threatens her if she doesn't adjust her apparent attitude problem. Jade suddenly experiences a flashback from when she was in the midst of her parents' divorce. Instead of wanting custody, she forced Jade to choose who she wanted to live with. Jade realizes her mother never cared about her. Jade uses this as an excuse to run off to her best friend Horizon's home where Billy tackles her onto Horizon's front lawn. Jade insults Billy who slaps her prompting Horizon to run inside. Billy kisses a stunned Jade who seems to reciprocate. Horizon informs Billy her mother phoned the police for hitting Jade. Billy claims that won't be necessary and leads a compliant Jade back to his car.

Jesse is initially upset with Billy for disciplining her daughter but later forgives him (she isn't aware Billy kissed Jade). After a long day spent at the beach, an exhausted Jesse falls asleep when she returns home. Jesse later wakes up to find Billy and Jade watching a film and orders Jade to remove her sheepdog Otis from her bed and continue the movie downstairs. Billy attempts to have sexual intercourse with Jesse but when she rejects him, he goes downstairs to have sex with Jade, unbeknownst to Jesse.

The next morning, Billy reminds a regretful Jade not to tell Jesse in fear she may never forgive them. After Jade quits her job, Billy allows her to work in the stockroom of his café where he apologizes for taking advantage of her and offers a cash bribe if it means not telling her mother. Jesse arrives, surprises Billy and questions Jade about why she isn't at work. Jade tells her she quit before leaving the café. When Jesse confronts her, Jade is about to tell her the truth when Billy intimidates her into silence. Jade evades her mother and a panicked Billy issues Jesse an ultimatum. Either she weds him or he will walk out of her life. Jesse accepts which provokes jealousy in Jade.

The following morning, Jade visits her father Les and informs him of the sexual encounter with Billy though she doesn't disclose his identity or what his relation is to her. Jade emphasizes that she refuses to press charges due to the fact he has two children (from his previous marriage) whom he cares for. When Jessie is notified, she manages to extract the truth from the hysterical and emotionally confused Jade; it was Billy. Jesse slaps her and says Jade is lying because she's jealous of Jesse. The pressure of the situation prompts Jade to suffer from an asthma attack and she is taken to the emergency room. Jade is later sent to live with Les and his wife Denise. When Jade decides to permanently reside with her father, Jesse breaks down crying and comes to the belief she is a horrible mother. Jesse informs Billy of what had transpired and threatens him to stay out of their lives. The engagement is over, and if he ever goes near her or Jade; she will kill him.

Several months later, Jade continues to live with Les and Denise in the San Fernando Valley. She took her mother's advice and opened up her 'friendship circle' and has made more friends at her new school than the previous one she attended. Jesse regularly visits her daughter and they walk the beach together. One afternoon, Jade suggests for Jesse to resume her relationship with Billy now that she is no longer around. But Jesse promises Jade there will be no chance of reconciling. The two discuss Denise's belief in reincarnation before Les arrives to pick up Jade. As Jade races to the vehicle she turns around and tells her mother that if there is such an idea of reincarnation she would still like to be her daughter. This brings tears to Jesse's eyes and she announces her love and sacrifice for her daughter. Jesse continues to walk along the shore of the beach with Otis before she turns to stare at the blue expanse hoping for a brighter future and a new beginning.

== Cast ==
- Beverly D'Angelo as Jesse Larson
- Jenny Lewis as Jade Larson
- Meadow Sisto as Horizon
- Rob Estes as Billy Stone
- Ted Shackelford as Les Larson
- Judyann Elder as Teak
- Brian Donovan as Shand
- Pamela Kosh as Dowager
- John LaMotta as Gino
- Francia Dimase as Caroline
- Wendy Lawless as Denise
- Natasha Dorfhuber as Molly Stone
- David Quittman as Robbie Stone
