= Clancy Carlile =

American novelist

- Born: Clarence Lawson Carlile; January 18, 1930; Oklahoma, United States
- Died: June 4, 1998 (aged 68); Austin, Texas
- Occupation: Author
- Children: Steven
- Writing career
- Genres: Novels, screenplay

Clancy Carlile (January 18, 1930 – June 4, 1998) was an American novelist and screenwriter of Cherokee descent. He is perhaps best known for his 1980 novel Honkytonk Man, made into a film by Clint Eastwood.

== Early years ==
Carlile was born in the Choctaw Nation's tribal jurisdictional area in Oklahoma, and his father was Cherokee. He had an "erratic childhood," and he moved to Texas at a young age. Carlile was a high school drop-out. He worked as a cotton picker until his family moved to California to pick fruit. He served in the army during the Korean War and after being discharged, obtained a master's degree at San Francisco State University.

== Career ==
Carlile began writing in the early 1960s, and penned his first novel, presumably As I Was Young and Easy (1958) in just 17 days. This was followed by Spore 7 (1979). In Honkytonk Man (1980), the tale of the life and death of a country singer which was made into a film by Clint Eastwood in which Eastwood also starred, Carlile wrote both the novel and the screenplay. His final novel, Children of the Dust (1995), about the settling of Oklahoma, was made into a CBS mini-series featuring Sidney Poitier. This novel is related to the author's heritage, being from the Oklahoma Territory. The story is set in the late 1880s, with Gypsy Smith (Poitier) being a gunslinger of African American and Cherokee descent who helps African American homesteaders settle the territory under the specter of white people. The Paris Pilgrims was published posthumously in 1999. The Paris Pilgrims combines "memoirs, biographies and fiction" with Carlile's imagination to present a "quasifictional account" of famous US expatriates in 1920s Paris. The Paris Pilgrims features US writer Ernest Hemingway, as well as many other public figures, "which includes everyone from Ezra Pound to Sylvia Beach to Lincoln Steffens to Picasso, Braque, Gide and Cole Porter."

Carlile was also a songwriter, musician, and producer who played guitar and sang, including with members of Grateful Dead. He is credited for the music and lyrics of a song "I'm a Lovin' Man"; its 1970 recording features Carlile and possibly vocals from Bob Weir. Carlile also provides vocals on the 1972 song called "Crash and Depression," from an LP called The Nation in Prosperity and Poverty, as well as vocals, writing, and arrangement for the 1972 LP called Settling the West.

== Personal life ==
Carlile spent much of his later life in Austin, Texas, where he had a writing fellowship at the University of Texas. Carlile had a son named Steven and four grandchildren. He died in Austin from cancer at the age of 68 on June 4, 1998.
