= Pareto =

Pareto may refer to:

== People ==
- Vilfredo Pareto (1848–1923), Italian economist, political scientist, and philosopher, works named for him include:
  - Pareto analysis, a statistical analysis tool in problem solving
  - Pareto distribution, a power-law probability distribution
  - Pareto efficiency
  - Pareto frontier, the set of all Pareto efficient solutions
  - Pareto principle, or the 80-20 rule
- Bartolomeo Pareto, medieval priest and cartographer from Genoa
- Graziella Pareto (1889–1973), Catalan soprano
- Lorenzo Pareto (1800–1865), Italian geologist and statesman
- Paula Pareto (born 1986), Argentine judoka
- Benedetto Pareto, builder of the Shrine of Nostra Signora della Guardia in Liguria, Italy

== Other uses ==
- Pareto, Piedmont, a town in Italy
- Pareto Group, a Norwegian finance company

== See also ==
- Paret, a surname
- Pereto, a town in Italy
- Perito, a town in Italy
