= Mario Puzo =

American author and screenwriter (1920–1999)

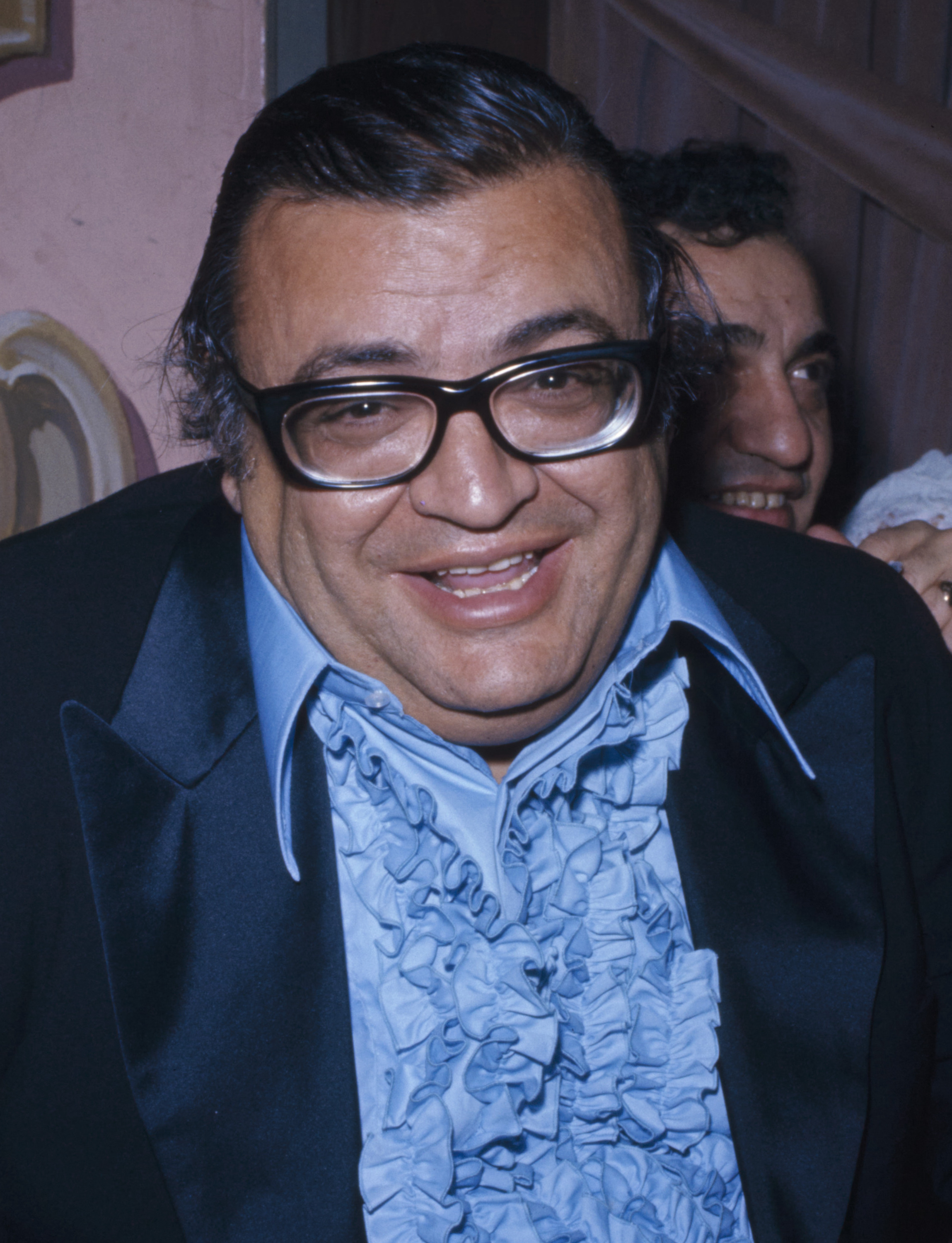
- Puzo in 1972
- Born: Mario Francis Puzo; October 15, 1920; New York City, U.S.
- Died: July 2, 1999 (aged 78); West Bay Shore, New York, U.S.
- Occupations: Novelist; screenwriter; journalist
- Spouse: Erika Lina Broske (m. 1946; died 1978)
- Partner: Carol Gino (1979–1999)
- Children: 5
- Writing career
- Pen name: Mario Cleri
- Period: 1955–1999
- Genre: Crime fiction
- Subject: Mafia
- Notable work: The Godfather (1969)
- Military career
- Branch: United States Army Air Forces
- Conflicts: World War II
- Website: mariopuzo.com

Mario Francis Puzo (/ˈpuːzoʊ/; Italian: [ˈmaːrjo ˈputtso, -ddzo]; October 15, 1920 – July 2, 1999) was an American author and screenwriter. He wrote crime novels about the Italian-American Mafia and Sicilian Mafia, most notably The Godfather (1969), which he later co-adapted into a film trilogy directed by Francis Ford Coppola. He received the Academy Award for Best Adapted Screenplay for the first film in 1972 and for its sequel Part II in 1974. Puzo also wrote the original screenplay for Superman (1978) and its 1980 sequel. His final novel, The Family, was released posthumously in 2001.

== Early life ==
Mario Francis Puzo was born in the Hell's Kitchen neighborhood of Manhattan in New York City on October 15, 1920, to Italian immigrants from the Province of Avellino; his father was from Pietradefusi and his mother from Ariano Irpino. When Puzo was 12, his father, who worked as a trackman for the New York Central Railroad, was committed to the Pilgrim State Hospital for schizophrenia, and his wife Maria was left to raise their seven children. Puzo graduated from the City College of New York.

=== Military service ===
Puzo served in the United States Army Air Forces in Germany in World War II.

== Writing career ==
In 1950, Puzo's first short story, "The Last Christmas," was published in American Vanguard and republished in the 1953 anthology New Voices: American Writing Today #1. After the war, he wrote his first book, the novel The Dark Arena, which was published in 1955.

In 1960, Bruce Jay Friedman hired Puzo as an assistant editor of a group of men's pulp magazines with titles such as Male and Men. Under the pen name Mario Cleri, Puzo wrote World War II adventure features for magazine True Action. A November 1965 short story, "Six Graves to Munich", was expanded into a novel in October 1967, and adapted into a film in 1982.

In 1969, Puzo's best-known work, The Godfather, was published. Puzo stated that this story came from research into organized crime, not from personal experience, and that he was looking to write something that would have wide popular appeal. The novel remained on The New York Times Best Seller list for 67 weeks and sold over nine million copies in two years. The book was later developed into the film The Godfather (1972), directed by Francis Ford Coppola. Paramount Pictures originally found out about Puzo's novel in 1967 when a literary scout for the company contacted then Paramount Vice President of Production Peter Bart about Puzo's unfinished sixty-page manuscript. Bart believed the work was "much beyond a Mafia story" and offered Puzo a $12,500 (equivalent to $115,700 in 2025) option for the work, with an option for $80,000 (equivalent to $740,700 in 2025) if the finished work was made into a film. Despite Puzo's agent telling him to turn down the offer, Puzo was desperate for money and accepted the deal. Paramount's Robert Evans relates that, when they met in early 1968, he offered Puzo the $12,500 deal for the 60-page manuscript titled Mafia after the author confided in him that he urgently needed $10,000 (equivalent to $92,600 in 2025) to pay off gambling debts. The film received three awards of its eleven Oscar category nominations, including Puzo's Oscar for Best Adapted Screenplay.

Coppola and Puzo then collaborated on sequels to the original film, The Godfather Part II (1974) and The Godfather Part III (1990). Coppola and Puzo preferred the title The Death of Michael Corleone for the third film, but Paramount Pictures found that unacceptable. In September 2020, for the film's 30th anniversary, it was announced that a new cut of the film titled Mario Puzo's The Godfather, Coda: The Death of Michael Corleone would have a limited theatrical release in December 2020 followed by digital and Blu-ray. Coppola said the film is the version he and Puzo had originally envisioned, and it "vindicates" its status among the trilogy.

In mid-1972, Puzo wrote the first draft of the script for the 1974 disaster film Earthquake, but he was unable to continue work into 1973 because of his prior commitment to The Godfather Part II. Work continued on the script without his involvement, with writer George Fox (working on his first, and only, motion picture screenplay) and producer / director Mark Robson, who remained uncredited as a writer. Puzo retained screen credit in the completed film as a result of a quickly-settled lawsuit over story credit (most major elements from his first draft made it into the final film), and Puzo's name subsequently featured heavily in the advertising. Puzo also wrote the original screenplay for Richard Donner's Superman, which then also included the plot for Superman II, as they were originally written as one film. He also collaborated on the stories for the 1982 film A Time to Die and the 1984 Francis Ford Coppola film The Cotton Club.

In 1991, Puzo's speculative fiction novel The Fourth K was published. It centres on a fictional member of the Kennedy family dynasty who becomes President of the United States in the 2000s.

Puzo never saw the publication of his penultimate book, Omertà, but the manuscript was finished before his death, as was that for The Family. A review originally published in the San Francisco Chronicle, Jules Siegel, who had worked closely with Puzo at Magazine Management Company, speculated that Omertà may have been completed by "some talentless hack". Siegel also acknowledged the temptation to "rationalize avoiding what is probably the correct analysis, that [Puzo] wrote it and it is terrible".

== Personal life and death ==
Puzo married a German woman, Erika Lina Broske, in 1946, and they had five children. When Broske died of breast cancer at the age of 57 in 1978, her nurse, Carol Gino, became Puzo's companion.

Puzo died of heart failure on July 2, 1999, at his home in West Bay Shore, New York, at the age of 78.

== Legacy ==
=== In popular culture ===
In April 2022, Paramount+ began streaming The Offer, a 10-episode drama mini-series telling a fictionalized story of the making of The Godfather, including Puzo's decision to write the novel. Patrick Gallo plays Puzo. Victoria Kelleher plays his wife, Erika.

== Works ==
=== Novels ===
- The Dark Arena (1955)
- The Fortunate Pilgrim (1965)
- The Runaway Summer of Davie Shaw (1966)
- Six Graves to Munich (1967), as Mario Cleri
- The Godfather (1969)
- Fools Die (1978)
- The Sicilian (1984) (set between the sixth and seventh books of The Godfather)
- The Fourth K (1990)
- The Last Don (1996)
- Omertà (2000)
- The Family (2001) (completed by Puzo's longtime girlfriend Carol Gino)

==== Notes ====
Mark Winegardner and Edward Falco have written novels related to The Godfather.

=== Non-fiction ===
- "Test Yourself: Are You Heading for a Nervous Breakdown?" as Mario Cleri (1965)
- "The Six Million Killer Sharks That Terrorize Our Shores" as Mario Cleri (1966)
- "Choosing a Dream: Italians in Hell's Kitchen" (1971)
- The Godfather Papers and Other Confessions (1972)
- Inside Las Vegas (1977)

=== Short stories ===
- "The Last Christmas" (1950)
- "John 'Red' Marston's Island of Delight" (1964)
- "Big Mike's Wild Young Sister-in-law" (1964)
- "Six Graves to Munich" (1965)
- “Saigon Nymph Who Led the Green Berets to the Cong's Terror Headquarters” (1966)
- "Trapped Girls in the Riviera's Flesh Casino" (1967)
- "The Unkillable Six" (1967)
- "First Sundays" (1968)
- "Girls of Pleasure Penthouse" (1968)
- "Order Lucy For Tonight" (1968)
- "12 Barracks of Wild Blondes" (1968)
- "Charlie Reese's Amazing Escape from a Russian Death Camp" (1969)

==== Notes ====
With the exception of "The Last Christmas" and "First Sundays", these were published under the name Mario Cleri.

=== Screenplays ===
- The Godfather (1972)
- Earthquake (1974 – August 1972 script draft only)
- The Godfather Part II (1974)
- Superman (1978)
- Superman II (1980)
- The Cotton Club (1984 – story only)
- The Godfather Part III (1990)
- Christopher Columbus: The Discovery (1992)
- Superman II: The Richard Donner Cut (2006)
- The Godfather, Coda: The Death of Michael Corleone (2020)

=== Film adaptations ===
- A Time to Die (1982)
- The Sicilian (1987)
- The Fortunate Pilgrim (1988)
- The Last Don (1997)
- The Last Don II (1998)

=== Video game adaptations ===
- The Godfather (1991)
- The Godfather (2006)
- The Godfather II (2009)

== See also ==
- The Godfather (book series)
