= The Godfather Papers and Other Confessions =

Book by Mario Puzo

- U.S. first edition cover (published by Putnam)
- Author: Mario Puzo
- Language: English
- Publication date: 1972

The Godfather Papers and Other Confessions is a 1972 collective autobiography written by Mario Puzo, on his journey through writing his 1969 novel The Godfather.

I was forty-five years old and tired of being an artist. Besides, I owed $20,000 to relatives, finance companies, banks and assorted bookmakers and shylocks. It was really time to grow up and sell out as Lenny Bruce once advised. So I told my editors OK, I'll write a book about the Mafia...

It explains Puzo's reasoning for writing The Godfather:

I have written three novels. The Godfather is not as good as the preceding two; I wrote it to make money...
