= The Last Don =

Novel by Mario Puzo

- U.S. first edition cover
- Author: Mario Puzo
- Language: English
- Subject: Crime novel
- Publisher: Random House
- Publication date: 1996
- Publication place: United States
- Media type: Print

The Last Don is a 1996 novel by American author Mario Puzo, best known as the author of the 1969 novel The Godfather. The story follows an aging Mafia Don and his family as they try to retain power.

The story alternates between the film industry and the Las Vegas Strip casinos, and explores how the American Mafia is linked to both.

The Last Don was adapted into a television miniseries of the same name, which aired in 1997. A sequel to the miniseries, The Last Don II, aired in 1998. This novel was the last released before Puzo’s death in 1999, although two more were released subsequently.

== Plot ==
The last plan of Don Domenico Clericuzio, an aging Mafia boss, is to eventually have his family enter the legitimate world and assimilate into American society. Twenty-five years later, his grandson Dante and grandnephew Croccifixio "Cross" De Lena make their way through life, and the eighty-year-old Don is semi-retired. Cross, who holds a majority share in a Las Vegas casino, is supposed to become the strong arm of the family. However, when he refuses to take part in the murder of an old friend, Dante is left to be the sole tough guy. Dante's greed for power and blood lead him to plan the elimination of his relatives, who are an obstacle to the desire to become as powerful as the old Don himself. When Dante arranges a hit on Cross's father, strongman Pippi De Lena—who, in a subplot, once commanded the elimination of the rival Santadio Family whose scion, Jimmy, married Don Clericuzio's daughter Rose Marie and fathered Dante before his family's assassination, driving Dante's mother to insanity—Cross, who is aware of being on the blacklist, catches Dante in a trap. Having acted against the family, he waits for the Don's vendetta, but, to his own surprise, his life is spared and he is only condemned to exile. Cross then resumes his romance with actress Athena Aquitane. The story ends with the revelation that Don Clericuzio planned this outcome, even anticipating his grandson's death, all along, for the long-term survival of his family.

== Miniseries ==
The Last Don was the basis for the 1997 CBS television miniseries of the same name written by Joyce Eliason and starring Joe Mantegna, Danny Aiello, and Daryl Hannah. In 1998, this was followed by The Last Don II, in which Cross is restored from exile to take reluctant command of the Clericuzio Family upon the Don's death.
