= The Godfather (film series) =

1972–1990 film series directed by Francis Ford Coppola

- Directed by: Francis Ford Coppola
- Screenplay by: Mario Puzo; Francis Ford Coppola
- Based on: The Godfather by Mario Puzo
- Produced by: Albert S. Ruddy (1); Francis Ford Coppola (2–3)
- Cinematography: Gordon Willis
- Edited by: Peter Zinner (1–2); Barry Malkin (2–3); William H. Reynolds (1); Richard Marks (2); Lisa Fruchtman(3); Walter Murch (3)
- Music by: Nino Rota (1–2); Carmine Coppola (3)
- Production companies: Alfran Productions (1); The Coppola Company (2); American Zoetrope (3)
- Distributed by: Paramount Pictures
- Release dates: March 15, 1972 (The Godfather); December 20, 1974 (The Godfather Part II); December 25, 1990 (The Godfather Part III)
- Running time: 539 minutes
- Country: United States
- Languages: English; Italian
- Budget: $73–74.2 million (Note: Sources disagree on both the amount of the original budget and the final budget of the first film. The final budget has been named at $6 million, $6.5 million, $7 million, and $7.2 million.)
- Box office: $430.9–517.4 million (Note: Sources disagree on the amount grossed by the first film.: 1974: Newsweek. Vol. 84. 1974. p. 74. "The original Godfather has grossed a mind-boggling $285 million..."; 1991: Von Gunden, Kenneth (1991). Postmodern auteurs: Coppola, Lucas, De Palma, Spielberg, and Scorsese. McFarland & Company. p. 36. ISBN 978-0-89950-618-0. "Since The Godfather had earned over $85 million in U.S.-Canada rentals (the worldwide box-office gross was $285 million), a sequel, according to the usual formula, could be expected to earn approximately two-thirds of the original's box-office take (ultimately Godfather II had rentals of $30 million)."; Releases: "The Godfather (1972)". Box Office Mojo. "Original release: $243,862,778; 1997 re-release: $1,267,490; 2009 re-release: $121,323; 2011 re-release: $818,333; 2014 re-release: $29,349; 2018 re-release: $21,701; Budget: $6,000,000") (Note: Sources disagree on the amount grossed by the second film. Releases: Some sources claim an original release of $88 million.)

The Godfather is a trilogy of American crime films directed by Francis Ford Coppola inspired by the 1969 novel of the same name by Italian American author Mario Puzo. The films follow the trials of the fictional Italian American mafia Corleone family whose patriarch, Vito Corleone, rises to be a major figure in American organized crime. His youngest son, Michael Corleone, becomes his successor. The films were distributed by Paramount Pictures and released in 1972, 1974, and 1990. The series achieved success at the box office, with the films earning between $430 and $517 million worldwide. The Godfather and The Godfather Part II are both seen by many as two of the greatest films of all time. The series is heavily awarded, winning 9 out of 28 Academy Award nominations and 5 out of 20 Golden Globe Awards.

== Film series ==
=== The Godfather ===
The Godfather was released on March 15, 1972. The feature-length film was directed by Francis Ford Coppola and was based on Mario Puzo's novel of the same name. The plot begins with Don Vito Corleone declining an offer to join the narcotics business with notorious drug lord Virgil Sollozzo, which leads to an assassination attempt. Vito's oldest son Sonny subsequently takes over the family business, and he conspires with Michael to strike back for the assassination attempt by having him kill Sollozzo and a corrupt police captain, forcing Michael to go to Sicily in hiding. While in Sicily, Michael travels around the country and meets a woman he marries, but who is killed in a car bombing. Michael returns to America after the news of his brother Sonny's murder and marries his former girlfriend Kay. Vito then turns over the reins of the family to Michael. Michael plans to move the family business to Las Vegas, but before the move, his father dies, and he plots the killing of the heads of the five families on the day of his nephew's baptism. Other subplots include Vito's daughter's abusive marriage, Johnny Fontane's success in Hollywood, and Vito's second son Fredo's role in the family business in Las Vegas.

=== The Godfather Part II ===
The Godfather Part II was released on December 20, 1974. The feature-length film was again directed by Francis Ford Coppola. Both films, The Godfather I and The Godfather II are based on a single novel written by Mario Puzo, The Godfather. The film is in part both a sequel and a prequel to The Godfather, presenting two parallel dramas. The main storyline, following the first film's events, centers on Michael Corleone, the new Don of the Corleone crime family, trying to hold his business ventures together from 1958 to 1959; the other is a series of flashbacks following his father, Vito Corleone, from his childhood in Sicily in 1901 to his founding of the Corleone family in New York City.

=== The Godfather Part III ===
The Godfather Part III was released on December 25, 1990. Francis Ford Coppola returned as director for the feature-length film, while also writing the screenplay with the help of the author Mario Puzo. In his audio commentary for Part II, Coppola stated the first two films having told the complete Corleone saga, with nothing more to add, led him to decline multiple requests from Paramount to make a third installment for over a decade. The critical and commercial failure of One from the Heart (1982) were to cause him severe financial difficulties and compel him to accept the long-standing offer.

The Godfather Part III completes the story of Michael Corleone, who is now trying to legitimize his criminal empire, and shows the rise of Sonny Corleone's illegitimate son Vincent Corleone as Michael's successor. The film also portrays a fictionalized account of real-life events, including the death of Pope John Paul I and the Papal banking scandal of 1981 & '82, linking them together and with the affairs of Michael Corleone. Coppola has stated he intended for Part III to be an epilogue to the first two films. The film co-stars Sofia Coppola as Mary Corleone, whose performance was received negatively by critics. Leonard Maltin said of the film that the casting of Sofia Coppola was an "almost-fatal flaw".

==== Recut version ====
On December 4, 2020, a recut version of the film titled The Godfather Coda: The Death of Michael Corleone was released in a limited number of theatres as well as being released on Blu-ray and streaming platforms. Coppola said the film is the version he and Puzo had originally envisioned, and it "vindicates" its status among the trilogy and his daughter Sofia's performance.

== Cancelled fourth film ==
Coppola stated that he and Puzo had discussed the potential of a fourth installment. The fourth film was intended to be a prequel and a sequel told in a similar narrative to Part II. They had discussed a potential script seeing Vito Corleone and Sonny gaining the families' political power and racketeering empire during the 1930s; and with Vincent Corleone in the 1980s, haunted by Mary's death, running the family business through a ten-year destructive war and eventually losing the families' business interests, respect and power, seeing one final scene with Michael Corleone before his death, completing the 100-year story of the Corleone family's rise and fall.

Many actors were rumoured to be cast in the film: Robert De Niro, Andy García, and Talia Shire were suggested to be reprising their roles. Leonardo DiCaprio was discussed as being cast as a young Sonny Corleone.

In June 1999, The Hollywood Reporter had reported that a fourth film was in the works with García in the lead role. García has since claimed the film's script was nearly produced, but following Puzo's death on July 2, Coppola decided to retire the film series indefinitely. Puzo's contribution to the potential sequel dealt with the Corleone family in the early 1930s, and was eventually expanded into a novel by Ed Falco and released in 2012 as The Family Corleone. The estate of Puzo had sought to keep Paramount Pictures from producing the film based on The Family Corleone. Now resolved, Paramount has gained the rights to make more Godfather films.

== Cast ==
List indicators

This section includes characters who will appear or have appeared in the film series.

- An empty grey cell indicates the character was not in the film, or that the character's official presence has not yet been confirmed.
- ^{A} indicates an appearance through archival footage or audio.
- ^{E} indicates an appearance not included in the theatrical cut.
- ^{O} indicates an older version of the character.
- ^{U} indicates an uncredited appearance.
- ^{Y} indicates a younger version of the character.

Character	Film		
Character	The Godfather	The Godfather Part II	The Godfather Part III
Michael Corleone	Al Pacino	Al Pacino Louis Marino^{Y}^{U}	Al Pacino
Katherine "Kay" Adams Corleone	Diane Keaton	Diane Keaton	Diane Keaton
Albert "Al" Neri	Richard Bright	Richard Bright	Richard Bright
Constanzia "Connie" Corleone	Talia Shire	Talia Shire	Talia Shire
Theresa Hagen	Tere Livrano	Tere Livrano	Tere Livrano
Francesca Corleone	Jeanne Savarino Pesch	Jeanne Savarino Pesch	Jeanne Savarino Pesch
Kathryn Corleone	Janet Savarino Smith	Janet Savarino Smith	Janet Savarino Smith
Don Tommasino	Corrado Gaipa	Mario Cotone	Vittorio Duse
Anthony "Tony" Corleone	Anthony Gounaris	James Gounaris	Franc D'Ambrosio
Frederico "Fredo" Corleone	John Cazale	John Cazale	John Cazale^{A}
Vito Corleone	Marlon Brando	Robert De Niro Oreste Baldini^{Y}	
Thomas "Tom" Hagen	Robert Duvall	Robert Duvall	
Santino "Sonny" Corleone	James Caan	Roman Coppola^{U} James Caan^{O}	
Peter Clemenza	Richard S. Castellano	Bruno Kirby^{Y}	
Salvatore "Sal" Tessio	Abe Vigoda	John Aprea Abe Vigoda^{O}	
Carmela Corleone	Morgana King	Morgana King Francesca De Sapio^{Y}	
Carlo Rizzi	Gianni Russo	Gianni Russo	
Sandrinella "Sandra" Corleone	Julie Gregg	Julie Gregg	
Rocco Lampone	Tom Rosqui	Tom Rosqui	
Willi Cicci	Joe Spinell	Joe Spinell	
Genco Abbandando	Franco Corsaro^{E}	Frank Sivero	
Johnny Fontane	Al Martino		Al Martino
Calo	Franco Citti		Franco Citti
Lucy Mancini	Jeannie Linero		Jeannie Linero
Enzo Aguello	Gabrielle Torrei		Gabrielle Torrei
Apollonia Vitelli-Corleone	Simonetta Stefanelli		Simonetta Stefanelli^{A}
Fabrizio	Angelo Infanti		
Captain McCluskey	Sterling Hayden		
Jack Woltz	John Marley		
Emilio Barzini	Richard Conte		
Virgil Sollozzo	Al Lettieri		
Carmine Cuneo	Rudy Bond		
Luca Brasi	Lenny Montana		
Paulie Gatto	Johnny Martino		
Amerigo Bonasera	Salvatore Corsitto		
Morris "Moe" Greene	Alex Rocco		
Bruno Tattaglia	Tony Giorgio		
Nazorine	Vito Scotti		
Philip Tattaglia	Victor Rendina		
Vitelli	Saro Urzi		
Victor Stracci	Don Costello		
Don Zaluchi	Louis Guss		
Mary Corleone		Uncredited actress	Sofia Coppola
Hyman Roth		Lee Strasberg John Megna^{Y}^{E}	
Frank Pentangeli		Michael V. Gazzo	
Pat Geary		G. D. Spradlin	
Fabrizio Fanucci		Gastone Moschin	
Deanna Dunn-Corleone		Marianna Hill	
Signor Roberto		Leopoldo Trieste	
Johnny Ola		Dominic Chianese	
Bussetta		Amerigo Tot	
Merle Johnson		Troy Donahue	
Vito's mother		Maria Carta	
Francesco Ciccio		Giuseppe Sillato	
Marcia Roth		Fay Spain	
FBI Man		Harry Dean Stanton	
Carmine Rosato		Carmine Caridi	
Tony Rosato		Danny Aiello	
Vincenzo Pentangeli		Salvatore Po	
Mosca		Ignazio Pappalardo	
Strollo		Andrea Maugeri	
Vincent Corleone			Andy García
Osvaldo "Ozzie" Altobello			Eli Wallach
Joey Zasa			Joe Mantegna
B J Harrison			George Hamilton
Grace Hamilton			Bridget Fonda
Cardinal Lamberto			Raf Vallone
Archbishop Gilday			Donal Donnelly
Frederick Keinszig			Helmut Berger
Dominic Abbandando			Don Novello
Andrew Hagen			John Savage
Mosca			Mario Donatone
Licio Lucchesi			Enzo Robutti
Spara			Michele Russo
Lou Pennino			Robert Cicchini
Armand			Rogerio Miranda
Francesco			Carlos Miranda
Anthony Squigliaro			Vito Antuofermo
Albert Volpe			Carmine Caridi
Frank Romano			Don Costello
Leo Cuneo			Al Ruscio
Matty Parisi			Mickey Knox

== Reception ==
=== Box office performance ===
Film	U.S. release date	Box office gross			Budget
Film	U.S. release date	U.S. and Canada	Other territories	Worldwide	Budget
The Godfather	March 15, 1972	$134,966,411	$111,154,563	$246,120,974–287,258,196	$6–7.2 million
The Godfather Part II	December 20, 1974	$47,834,595	$45,435,594	$93,270,189	$13 million
The Godfather Part III	December 25, 1990	$66,666,062	$70,100,000	$136,766,062	$54 million
Total		$249,467,068	$226,690,157	$476,157,225–517,294,647	$73–74.2 million

The first two films have grossed an estimated $800 million in theatrical, video, and television revenues.

=== Critical response ===
The films appear in many "Top" film lists, such as the American Film Institution's 100 Years...100 Movies, Time magazine's All-Time 100 Movies, the IMDb Top 250, Dallas-Fort Worth Film Critics Association's Top 10 Films, and James Berardinelli's Top 100. The Godfather Trilogy was ranked at No. 5 in Empire magazine's "The 33 Greatest Movie Trilogies" in 2010. The Independent ranked it at No. 6 on its list of "10 greatest movie trilogies of all time". Screen Rant ranked it at No. 4 on its list of "The Best Movie Trilogies Of All Time".

Film	Rotten Tomatoes	Metacritic
The Godfather	97% (9.4/10 average rating) (153 reviews)	100 (16 reviews)
The Godfather Part II	96% (9.7/10 average rating) (129 reviews)	90 (18 reviews)
The Godfather Part III	66% (6.4/10 average rating) (68 reviews)	60 (19 reviews)
The Godfather Coda: The Death of Michael Corleone	86% (7.5/10 average rating) (59 reviews)	76 (14 reviews)

=== Accolades ===
==== Academy Awards ====
The three films together were nominated for a total of 28 Academy Awards, of which they won nine. The Godfather is the first trilogy to have had all three of its films nominated for Best Picture (The Lord of the Rings is the only other series to achieve this); it is the only film series with two Best Picture winners, with The Godfather and The Godfather Part II winning the award in their respective years. The Godfather Part II is the first sequel film to win Best Picture (The Lord of the Rings: The Return of the King is the only other film to achieve this). For the Best Supporting Actor award, both The Godfather and The Godfather Part II had three actors nominated for the award, which is a rare feat. The Godfather Part II won the most Academy Awards with six to its credit. The Godfather Part III was nominated for seven Oscars, but won none.

- The Godfather — Nominations: 10, Wins: 3
- The Godfather Part II — Nominations: 11, Wins: 6
- The Godfather Part III — Nominations: 7, Wins: 0

The Godfather film series at the Academy Awards
Award	Awards won		
Award	The Godfather	The Godfather Part II	The Godfather Part III
Picture	Won	Won	Nominated
Director	Nominated	Won	Nominated
Actor	Won	Nominated	
Supporting Actor	Nominated (Note: Received three nominations in this category.)	Won (Note: Received three nominations in this category, winning one.)	Nominated
Supporting Actress		Nominated	
Adapted Screenplay	Won	Won	
Art Direction		Won	Nominated
Cinematography			Nominated
Costume Design	Nominated	Nominated	
Film Editing	Nominated		Nominated
Original Dramatic Score		Won	
Original Song			Nominated
Sound	Nominated		

==== Golden Globe Awards ====
The three films together were nominated for a total of 20 Golden Globe Awards, of which they won five.

- The Godfather — Nominations: 7, Wins: 5
- The Godfather Part II — Nominations: 6, Wins: 0
- The Godfather Part III — Nominations: 7, Wins: 0

The Godfather film series at the Golden Globe Awards
Award	Awards won		
Award	The Godfather	The Godfather Part II	The Godfather Part III
Picture – Drama	Won	Nominated	Nominated
Director – Motion Picture	Won	Nominated	Nominated
Actor – Drama	Won (Note: Received two nominations in this category, winning one.)	Nominated	Nominated
Supporting Actor – Motion Picture	Nominated		Nominated
Screenplay	Won	Nominated	Nominated
Original Score	Won	Nominated	Nominated
Original Song			Nominated
Most Promising Newcomer – Male		Nominated	

== Home media and television ==
All three Godfather films were released on VHS and LaserDisc formats.

Compilations were created by Coppola and editors Barry Malkin and Walter Murch, with three released to home media:

- The Godfather Saga (1977) – 434-minute television miniseries based on the first two films in chronological order and incorporating additional footage that was not included in the theatrical releases (with violence and language toned down for a television audience).
- The Godfather 1902–1959: The Complete Epic (1981) – 386-minute uncensored version of The Godfather Saga that was released directly to video (VHS format).
- The Godfather: The Epic 1901–1959 (1990) – 423-minute version of The Godfather Saga that was released to video in 1990 in Europe. An altered version aired on HBO in 2016 and was released to streaming services.
- The Godfather Trilogy: 1901–1980 (1992) – 583-minute uncensored version of The Godfather Saga released directly to video (VHS and LaserDisc formats) encompassing all three films and incorporating additional footage that the Saga and Epic releases had included.

Other box sets were released in DVD and Blu-ray formats:

- The Godfather DVD Collection (2001) – Includes all three films, commentaries, a documentary entitled The Godfather Family: A Look Inside, additional scenes originally contained in The Godfather Saga, a Corleone family tree, and a Godfather timeline.
- The Godfather: The Coppola Restoration (2008) – Includes all three films, commentaries, and a bonus features disc with new content and extras from Paramount's 2001 DVD release. Also included is an interview with David Chase, the creator of The Sopranos, discussing the cultural significance of the films.
- The Godfather Trilogy: Omerta Edition (2017) – A special 45th anniversary box set edition produced in the "limited" quantity of 45,000 copies, consisting of the Coppola Restoration versions of all three films on Blu-ray, a bonus feature Blu-ray disc, and various jacket-liner materials including quote cards, word-play magnets, and scene notes ("anatomy of a scene").
- The Godfather Trilogy (2022) – A 50th anniversary Blu-ray box set consisting of The Godfather, The Godfather Part II, and The Godfather Coda: The Death of Michael Corleone, along with old and new bonus materials. The Ultra HD Blu-ray version includes remastered and restored versions of all three films in 4K resolution, plus all three cuts of the third film: the original theatrical cut (previously unreleased on home video), the 1991 director's cut, and the 2020 Coda cut.

== Games ==
=== Video games ===
A side-scrolling shooter, The Godfather (1991), was the first video game based on the series. The Godfather: The Game (2006) was based on the first film. Duvall, Caan, and Brando supplied voiceovers and their likenesses, but Pacino did not. Francis Ford Coppola openly voiced his disapproval of the game. The Godfather II (2009) was based on the second film. A mobile game, The Godfather: Family Dynasty (2017), was released for iOS and Android devices.

=== Board game ===
A board game titled, The Godfather: Corleone's Empire, was released in 2017 by CMON. Ars Technica gave it a positive review, calling it "an exceptionally solid release".
