= List of Eli Wallach performances =

Filmography and credits of American actor Eli Wallach

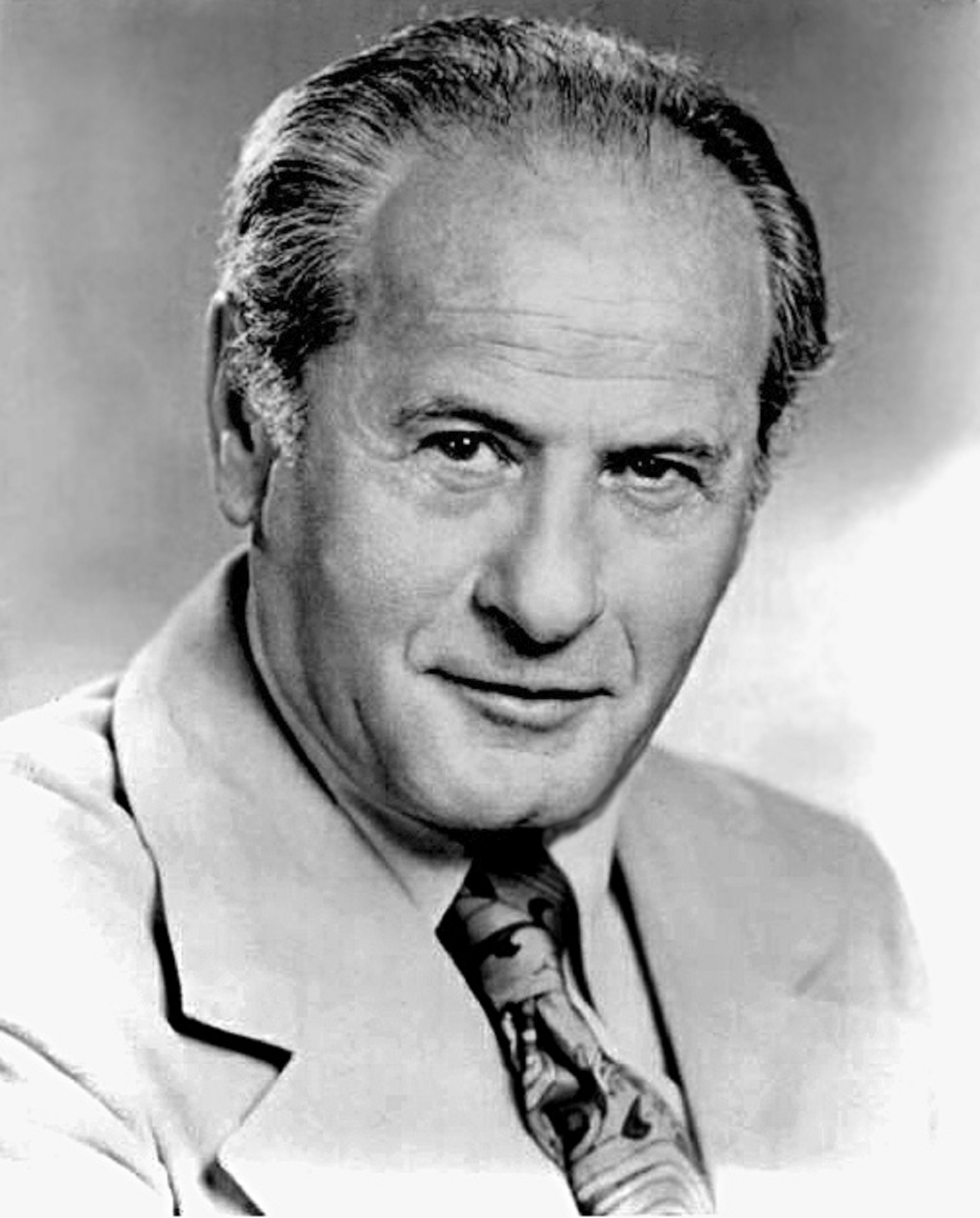
Publicity photo for The Good, the Bad and the Ugly in 1966

The following is the filmography and credits for American actor Eli Wallach (December 7, 1915 – June 24, 2014). He started acting in 1945 and is known for his film roles as Calvera in The Magnificent Seven (1960), Tuco in The Good, the Bad and the Ugly (1966), Napoleon in The Adventures of Gerard (1970), Cotton Weinberger in The Two Jakes (1990), Don Altobello in The Godfather Part III (1990), Donald Fallon in The Associate (1996), Arthur Abbott in The Holiday (2006), Noah Dietrich in The Hoax (2007), and Julie Steinhardt in Wall Street: Money Never Sleeps (2010), which was the last film he appeared in before retiring in 2010.

He has also appeared in numerous television series, most known for playing Mr. Freeze in two episodes of Batman in 1967.

== Filmography ==
=== Film ===
Year	Title	Role	Notes	Ref.
1956	Baby Doll	Silva Vacarro		
1958	The Lineup	Dancer		
1960	Seven Thieves	Pancho		
1960	The Magnificent Seven	Calvera		
1961	The Misfits	Guido		
1962	Hemingway's Adventures of a Young Man	John		
1962	How the West Was Won	Charlie Gant		
1963	The Victors	Sergeant Craig		
1963	Act One	Warren Stone		
1964	The Moon-Spinners	Stratos		
1964	Kisses for My President	Raphael Valdez Jr.		
1965	Lord Jim	The General		
1965	Genghis Khan	The Shah of Khwarezm		
1966	The Poppy Is Also a Flower	'Happy' Locarno		
1966	How to Steal a Million	Davis Leland		
1966	The Good, the Bad and the Ugly	Tuco Ramirez		
1967	The Tiger Makes Out	Ben Harris	Also producer	
1968	How to Save a Marriage and Ruin Your Life	Harry Hunter		
1968	A Lovely Way to Die	Tennessee Fredericks		
1968	Ace High	Cacopoulos		
1969	The Brain	Frankie Scannapieco		
1969	Mackenna's Gold	Ben Baker		
1970	Zig Zag	Mario Gambretti		
1970	The Adventures of Gerard	Napoleon Bonaparte		
1970	The Angel Levine	Delicatessen Clerk		
1970	The People Next Door	Arthur Mason		
1971	Romance of a Horsethief	Kifke		
1971	Long Live Your Death	Max Lozoya	Credited as Ely Wallach	
1973	Stateline Motel	Joe		
1973	Cinderella Liberty	Lynn Forshay		
1974	Crazy Joe	Don Vittorio		
1975	Shoot First... Ask Questions Later	Sheriff Edward Gideon a.k.a. Black Jack		
1975	L'chaim: to Life			
1975	Eye of the Cat	Cesare		
1976	Independence	Benjamin Franklin	Short	
1976	Plot of Fear	Pietro Riccio		
1977	The Sentinel	Detective Gatz		
1977	Nasty Habits	Monsignor		
1977	The Domino Principle	General Reser		
1977	The Deep	Adam Coffin		
1978	Circle of Iron	Man-in-Oil		
1978	Girlfriends	Rabbi Aaron Gold		
1978	Little Italy	Gerolamo Giarra	Credited as Ely Wallach	
1978	Movie Movie	Vince Marlow / Pop		
1979	Firepower	Sal Hyman		
1979	Winter Kills	Joe Diamond		
1980	Guri			
1980	The Hunter	Ritchie Blumenthal		
1981	The Salamander	General Leporello		
1984	Sam's Son	Sam Orowitz		
1986	Tough Guys	Leon B. Little		
1987	Nuts	Dr. Herbert A. Morrison		
1990	The Two Jakes	Cotton Weinberger		
1990	The Godfather Part III	Don Osvaldo Altobello		
1992	Article 99	Sam Abrams		
1992	Mistress	George Lieberhof		
1992	Night and the City	Peck		
1994	Honey Sweet Love...	Don Siro		
1995	Elia Kazan: A Director's Journey	Narrator	Documentary	
1995	Two Much	Sheldon Dodge		
1996	The Associate	Donald Fallon		
1996	Larry's Visit		Short	
1998	The Devil's Twilight	Brooklyn Shopkeeper	Short	
1999	Uninvited	Alan Strasser		
2000	Keeping the Faith	Rabbi Ben Lewis		
2002	Monday Night Mayhem	Leonard Goldenson		
2002	Advice and Dissent	The Rebbe	Short	
2003	Mystic River	Mr. Loonie, Liquor Store Owner	Uncredited	
2003	The Root			
2004	King of the Corner	Sol Spivak		
2004	The Easter Egg Adventure	Narrator	Voice	
2005	A Taste of Jupiter	Arturo		
2005	The Moon and the Son: An Imagined Conversation	Father	Voice; Short	
2006	The Hoax	Noah Dietrich		
2006	The Holiday	Arthur Abbott		
2006	Pola Negri: Life Is a Dream in Cinema	Himself	Documentary	
2006	Brand upon the Brain!	Narrator (Live recording)	Voice	
2007	Mama's Boy	Seymour Warburton		
2008	Liszt For President	Joe Nightingale		
2008	The Toe Tactic	Maestro		
2008	New York, I Love You	Abe	Segment: "Joshua Marston"	
2009	Tickling Leo	Emil Pikler		
2010	The Ghost Writer	Old Man		
2010	Wall Street: Money Never Sleeps	Julius Steinhardt		
2015	The Train	Andre	Short film; posthumous release	

=== Television ===
Year	Title	Role	Notes	Ref.
1949–1955	The Philco Television Playhouse	Nacho	4 episodes	
1951	Lights Out		Episode: "Rappaccini's Daughter"	
1952	Studio One	Peter Hendon	2 episodes	
1952	The Web		Episode: "Deadlock"	
1956	The Kaiser Aluminum Hour	Cristof	Episode: "A Fragile Affair"	
1957	The Seven Lively Arts	Ad Francis	Episode: "The World of Nick Adams"	
1958	Climax!	Albert Anastasia	Episode: "Albert Anastasia, His Life & Death"	
1958	Suspicion		Episode: "The Death of Paul Dane"	
1958	Westinghouse Desilu Playhouse	Raymond Perez	Episode: "My Father, The Fool"	
1958	Shirley Temple's Storybook	Simon	Episode: "The Emperor's New Clothes"	
1958	Playhouse 90	Rafael / Poskrebyshev	4 episodes	
1959	DuPont Show of the Month	Sancho Panza / Cervantes' Manservant	Episode: "I, Don Quixote"	
1960	The Play of the Week	Johnny Horton	Episode: "Lullaby"	
1960–1962	Naked City	Georgie / Detective Bane	2 episodes	
1962	The Dick Powell Show	Manny Jacobs	Episode: "Tomorrow, the Man"	
1962	Outlaws	Sheriff Ned Devers	Episode: "A Bit of Glory"	
1967	CBS Playhouse	Douglas Lambert	Episode: "Dear Friends"	
1967	Batman	Victor Fries/Mr. Freeze	2 episodes	
1971	The Young Lawyers	James Johnson Scott	Episode: "Legal Maneuver"	
1974	Great Performances	Leo	Episode: "Paradise Lost"	
1974	Orson Welles Great Mysteries	Fuzzy	Episode: "Compliments of the Season"	
1975	Kojak	Lee Curtin	Episode: "A Question of Answers"	
1977	Seventh Avenue	Gus Farber	Miniseries	
1981	Tales of the Unexpected	Gerry Williams	Episode: "Shatterproof"	
1985	Christopher Columbus	Father Hernando De Talavera	Miniseries	
1985–1986	Our Family Honor	Vincent Danzig	13 episodes	
1986	American Playhouse	Mr. Prince	Episode: "Rocket to the Moon"	
1987	Highway to Heaven	Gene Malloy / Tim Charles	2 episodes	
1987	Worlds Beyond	Charles	Episode: "The Black Tomb"	
1988	Murder, She Wrote	Salvatore Gambini	Episode: "A Very Good Year for Murder "	
1989	Alfred Hitchcock Presents	Yosef Kandinsky	Episode: "Kandinsky's Vault"	
1989	CBS Schoolbreak Special	Ira Abrams	Episode: "A Matter of Conscience"	
1991	L.A. Law	Judge Adam Biel	Episode: "There Goes the Judge"	
1992	Law & Order	Simon Vilanis	Episode: "The Working Stiff"	
1993	Tribeca	Joe	Episode: "Stepping Back"	
2001	100 Center Street	Joe Franlangelo	Episode: "Kids: Part 1"	
2002	The Education of Max Bickford	Jay Bickford, Max's Father	3 episodes	
2003	Veritas: The Quest	Rabbi	Episode: "The Name of God"	
2003	Whoopi	Norman	Episode: "American Woman"	
2003	ER	Mr. Langston	Episode: "A Boy Falling Out of the Sky"	
2005	Stroker and Hoop	Narrator	Episode: "I Saw Stroker Killing Santa"	
2006	Studio 60 on the Sunset Strip	Eli Weinraub	Episode: "The Wrap Party"	
2009	Nurse Jackie	Bernard Zimberg	Episode: "Chicken Soup"	

=== Television films ===
Year	Title	Role	Notes	Ref.
1957	The Lark	Dauphin		
1958	The Gift of the Magi	Narrator		
1958	Where Is Thy Brother	Dan		
1971	The Typists	Paul Cunningham		
1973	A Cold Night's Death	Frank Enari		
1974	Indict and Convict	DeWitt Foster		
1976	20 Shades of Pink			
1978	The Pirate	Ben Ezra		
1980	Fugitive Family			
1981	The Pride of Jesse Hallam	Sal Galucci		
1981	Skokie	Bert Silverman		
1982	The Wall	Mauritzi Apt		
1982	The Executioner's Song	Uncle Vern Damico		
1984	Anatomy of an Illness	Dr. William Hitzig		
1985	Embassy	Joe Verga		
1985	Murder: By Reason of Insanity	Dr. Huffman		
1986	Something In Common	Norman Voss		
1987	The Impossible Spy	Yacov		
1990	Vendetta: Secrets of a Mafia Bride	Frank Latella	Aka Bride of Violence	
1992	Legacy of Lies	Moses Resnick		
1992	Teamster Boss: The Jackie Presser Story	Bill Presser		
1993	Vendetta II: The New Mafia	Frank Latella	Aka Bride of Violence 2	
1996	O. Henry's Christmas	Behrman	segment "The Last Leaf"	
1998	Naked City: Justice with a Bullet	Deluca		
2000	The Bookfair Murders	Erich Schmidt		
2002	Monday Night Mayhem	Leonard Goldenson		

=== Documentaries ===
Year	Title	Role	Notes	Ref.
1987	Hollywood Uncensored	Himself		
1989	Funny	Himself		
2002	Cinerama Adventure	Himself		
2003	Broadway: The Golden Age	Himself		
2007	Constantine's Sword	Piero Terracina (voice)		
2007	The War	Reader	Miniseries (1 episode "When Things Get Tough")	
2009	The National Parks: America's Best Idea	Reader	Miniseries (3 episodes)	
2014	The Roosevelts	Reader	Miniseries (2 episodes)	

== Theatre ==
Year	Title	Role	Venue	Refs
1945	Skydrift	Crew Chief	Broadway; November 1945	
1946	King Henry VIII	Cromwell	Broadway; November 1946 - February 1947	
1946	What Every Woman Knows	Ensemble	Broadway; November 1946 - February 1947	
1946	Androcles and the Lion	Spintho	Broadway; December 1946 - February 1947	
1946	This Property Is Condemned		Equity Library Theatre	
1947	Yellow Jack	Busch	Broadway; February 1947 - March 1947	
1947	Alice in Wonderland	Duck, Two of Spades, Other voices	Broadway; April 1947 - June 1947	
1947	Antony and Cleopatra	Diomedes	Broadway; November 1947 - March 1948	
1948	Mister Roberts	Stefanowski - Replacement	February 1948 - January 1951	
1950	The Lady from the Sea	Ballested	August 1950	
1951	The Rose Tattoo	Alvaro Mangiacavallo	February 1951 - October 1951	
1953	Camino Real	Kilroy	March 1953 - May 1953	
1953	The Teahouse of the August Moon	Sakini - Replacement	October 1953 - March 1956	
1954	Mademoiselle Colombe	Julien	January 1954 - February 1954	
1956	Major Barbara	Bill Walker	October 1956 - May 1957	
1958	The Chairs and The Lesson	Old Man	January 1958	
1958	The Cold Wind And The Warm	Willie Lavin	December 1958 - March 1959	
1961	Rhinoceros	Berrenger	January 1961 - August 1961	
1964	Luv	Milt Manville	November 1964 - January 1967	
1968	Staircase	Charles Dyer	January 1968 - March 1968	
1972	Promenade, All!	Ollie H / Wesley	April 1972 - May 1972	
1973	The Waltz of the Toreadors	General St. Pé	September 1973 - November 1973	
1974	Saturday Sunday Monday	Peppino	November 1974	
1976	The House of Blue Leaves			
1978	The Diary of Anne Frank	Otto Frank		
1982	Twice Around the Park	Leon Rose / Gus Frazier	November 1982 - February 1983	
1984	Nest of the Wood Grouse		Public Theater	
1989	Cafe Crown	David Cole	Public Theater; February 1989 - March 1989	
1992	The Price	Gregory Solomon	June 1992 - July 1992	
1994	The Flowering Peach	Noah	March 1994 - April 1994	
1996	Visiting Mr. Green	Mr. Green	Union Square Theatre; June 1996 - July 1996	
2000	Down the Garden Paths			

== Radio appearances ==
Year	Program	Episode/source	Ref.
1953	Best Plays	The Rose Tattoo	

- Wallach read out Stephen King's novel Insomnia for Hodder & Stoughton Audio.
