= Complete Epic =

Complete Epic may refer to:

- The Godfather 1901-1959: The Complete Epic
- Marvel Complete Epics, a series of large trade paperback collections of Marvel Comics storylines
