= The Godfather Effect =

2012 book by Tom Santopietro

- Author: Tom Santopietro
- Language: English
- Genre: Non-fiction
- Publisher: Thomas Dunne Books
- Publication date: February 2012
- Publication place: United States
- Media type: Print (Hardcover)
- ISBN: 978-1-250-00513-7

The Godfather Effect is a 2012 critically acclaimed study of The Godfather films – as well as Mario Puzo's 1969 novel – and their impact on American culture. Written by biographer Tom Santopietro, the book demonstrates how The Godfather was a turning point in American cultural consciousness. With its emphasis on proud ethnicity, The Godfather changed not just the way Italian-Americans saw themselves, but how Americans of all backgrounds viewed their individual and national self-identities, their possibilities, and attendant disappointments.

"The Godfather Effect" also had a broader philosophical dimension. As noted by Santopietro, "what Puzo delivered – brilliantly – was nothing less than a disquisition on the madness, glory, and failure of the American dream." Early in the novel, Amerigo Bonasera declares "I believe in America." The novel then depicts a nation where the Mafia and big business are two sides of the same coin: both are corrupt, tell the truth selectively, and do exactly as they wish.

== Reception ==
The Godfather Effect was widely reviewed and well received by the press. The Hollywood Reporter called it "a beautiful narrative of the way pop culture shapes our self-image."

The Wall Street Journal declared that "part memoir, part devotional film essay and part reflection on the meaning of ethnicity in American life, The Godfather Effect defines how the Godfather movies, along with the 1969 Mario Puzo novel from which they were adapted, reflected the madness, glory and failure of the American dream. By exploring that dream in distinctly Italian-American terms, the movies succeeded in delivering nothing less than the Italianization of American culture. In other words, they were so cool that everyone wanted to seem a little Italian."

Newsday appreciated the personal dimension in Santopietro's book, noting, "In the end, it's the personal moments, such as Santopietro taking his aging dad to revisit the field where he played baseball as a child, that are most rewarding. The films make up the shell of The Godfather Effect, but it's the connections with family that give it a center as sweet as cannoli cream."

The New York Journal of Books found that Santopietro "capably weaves together the memoirist elements, the history, and the analyses of the formal and thematic aspects of the films."

The book was recognized for its historical value by Smithsonian Magazine, the official publication of the Smithsonian Institution.

== Author ==
External videos
- You can watch a video of Santopietro discussing The Godfather Effect here

An acclaimed biographer, Santopietro wrote in-depth studies of several Hollywood icons, each of whom reflected and defined the American cultural landscape. These included Doris Day (Considering Doris Day), Barbra Streisand (The Importance of Being Barbra), and the definitive account of Frank Sinatra's Hollywood film career (Sinatra in Hollywood).
