= Cardinal Lamberto =

Fictional character from The Godfather series

- Cardinal Lamberto, as portrayed by Raf Vallone in The Godfather Part III
- First appearance: The Godfather Part III
- Created by: Mario Puzo
- Portrayed by: Raf Vallone

In-universe information
- Alias: John Paul I
- Gender: Male
- Occupation: Cardinal in the Roman Catholic Church and later the Pontiff

Cardinal Lamberto is a fictional character appearing in the 1990 film The Godfather Part III. He is portrayed by Italian actor Raf Vallone.

== In the film ==
Lamberto is a Sicilian clergyman and he is the cardinal in the Roman Catholic Church favoured to succeed Pope Paul VI. He is visited by Don Michael Corleone on the advice of the elderly Sicilian Mafia boss Don Tommasino (Michael's Sicilian ally and his father's before him). Michael tells him of the swindle at the hands of corrupt Vatican bank officials Frederick Keinszig, Licio Lucchesi, and Archbishop Gilday. Michael suddenly suffers a low blood sugar episode due to his diabetes, and Lamberto orders that orange juice and candy bars be brought to him immediately. As Michael quickly recovers, Lamberto seizes the opportunity to encourage Michael to confess his sins; initially reluctant, Michael eventually does so under the Cardinal's gentle prodding, breaking down in tears when confessing to ordering the murder of his brother Fredo 20 years before. Lamberto tells Michael that he deserves to suffer for his terrible sins, yet absolves him and tells him he still has a chance for redemption.

Upon the death of Paul VI, Lamberto is elected the new pontiff; he takes the name John Paul I upon his accession. A moral, thoroughly honest man, he immediately calls for an investigation into the activities of the Vatican Bank and requests a meeting with Keinszig, the Bank's chief accountant. However, Keinszig has left Rome with a large sum of money and several documents. Fearing that their corruption will be exposed, Keinszig, Lucchesi, and Gilday plot to murder the Pope. Gilday poisons the pontiff's tea, killing him in his sleep.

== Inspiration ==
The character of Lamberto and the film's depiction of the events which led to his murder are based upon one of the conspiracy theories surrounding the sudden death of the real-life Pope John Paul I, Albino Luciani. Like the Lamberto character, Luciani was discovered dead in his bed in 1978, 33 days after his election to the papacy. Various theories, such as the one outlined in David Yallop's 1984 book, In God's Name, have suggested that John Paul I was murdered because he was planning reforms for the Vatican Bank, in light of the Banco Ambrosiano scandal. The purported equivalent of the character Keinszig, banker Roberto Calvi, was mired in the scandal and in fact found hanging under Blackfriars Bridge in London under dubious circumstances. Calvi had reviewed Mario Puzo's novel The Godfather, the basis for the film series, calling it "the only novel which shows how the world really is run."
