= Albert Volpe =

Fictional character from The Godfather series

- Carmine Caridi as Albert Volpe
- First appearance: The Godfather Part III
- Last appearance: The Godfather Part III
- Created by: Mario Puzo
- Portrayed by: Carmine Caridi

In-universe information
- Nickname: The Fox
- Gender: Male
- Title: Boss
- Affiliation: Chicago Outfit
- Nationality: Italian-American

Albert Volpe is a fictional character appearing in the 1990 film The Godfather Part III. He is portrayed by Carmine Caridi, who portrayed Carmine Rosato in The Godfather Part II (1974). Volpe is the boss of the Chicago Outfit in the 1970s.

== The Godfather Part III ==
Albert Volpe is one of the dons on the Commission. He is known to be a man with an eye for big business, and is one of many who attempted to make a fortune by investing in Michael Corleone's casinos. Michael calls a meeting of the Commission at a hotel in Atlantic City and liquidates his gambling empire, making his partners, including Volpe, multi-millionaires.

However, Volpe's success is short-lived. Moments after Michael announces the sale, assassins working for traitorous Corleone family caporegime Joey Zasa open fire on the hotel, killing everyone inside but Michael and his nephew Vincent Corleone. Volpe is shot dead after he gets his "lucky coat" stuck in a door.
