= Richard Marks =

American film editor (1943–2018)

- Born: November 10, 1943; New York City, New York, United States
- Died: December 31, 2018 (aged 75); New York City, New York, United States
- Occupation: Film editor
- Years active: 1969−2010
- Spouse: Barbara Marks

Richard Marks (November 10, 1943 – December 31, 2018) was an American film editor with more than 30 editing credits for feature and television films dating from 1972. In an extended, notable collaboration (1983–2010), he edited all of director James L. Brooks' feature films.

Marks was Barry Malkin's assistant editor on The Rain People (1969), which was directed by Francis Ford Coppola early in his career. He then assisted Dede Allen on Alice's Restaurant (1969) and on Little Big Man (1970); he co-edited Serpico (1973) with Allen. Dede Allen was among the most prominent film editors of her generation, and she was known for helping to develop the careers of several younger editors. Roger Crittenden has written that "Perhaps the outstanding graduate of the Dede Allen Academy is Richard Marks."

Marks was nominated for many awards including four Academy Awards (Oscars), three ACE Eddie Awards, three BAFTA Awards, and an Emmy.

Marks was elected to membership in the American Cinema Editors, and in 2013 he received their Career Achievement Award. Apocalypse Now was listed as the third best-edited film of all time in a 2012 survey of members of the Motion Picture Editors Guild.

== Filmography ==
The filmography is based on the Internet Movie Database listing.

Editor
Year	Film	Director	Notes
1972	Parades	Robert J. Siegel	
1973	Bang the Drum Slowly	John D. Hancock	
1973	Serpico	Sidney Lumet	
1974	Three Tough Guys	Duccio Tessari	
1974	The Godfather Part II	Francis Ford Coppola	Second collaboration with Francis Ford Coppola
1975	Lies My Father Told Me	Ján Kadár	
1976	The Last Tycoon	Elia Kazan	
1981	The Hand	Oliver Stone	
1981	Pennies from Heaven	Herbert Ross	First collaboration with Herbert Ross
1983	Max Dugan Returns	Herbert Ross	Second collaboration with Herbert Ross
1983	Terms of Endearment	James L. Brooks	First collaboration with James L. Brooks
1984	The Adventures of Buckaroo Banzai Across the 8th Dimension	W. D. Richter	
1985	St. Elmo's Fire	Joel Schumacher	
1986	Pretty in Pink	Howard Deutch	
1987	Broadcast News	James L. Brooks	Second collaboration with James L. Brooks
1989	Say Anything...	Cameron Crowe	
1990	Dick Tracy	Warren Beatty	
1991	One Good Cop	Heywood Gould	
1991	Father of the Bride	Charles Shyer	First collaboration with Charles Shyer
1994	I'll Do Anything	James L. Brooks	Third collaboration with James L. Brooks
1995	Things to Do in Denver When You're Dead	Gary Fleder	
1995	Assassins	Richard Donner	First collaboration with Richard Donner
1997	'Til There Was You	Scott Winant	
1997	As Good as It Gets	James L. Brooks	Fourth collaboration with James L. Brooks
1998	You've Got Mail	Nora Ephron	First collaboration with Nora Ephron
2000	What Planet Are You From?	Mike Nichols	
2001	Riding in Cars with Boys	Penny Marshall	Third collaboration with Penny Marshall
2003	Timeline	Richard Donner	Second collaboration with Richard Donner
2004	Spanglish	James L. Brooks	Fifth collaboration with James L. Brooks
2008	Made of Honor	Paul Weiland	
2009	Julie & Julia	Nora Ephron	Second collaboration with Nora Ephron
2010	How Do You Know	James L. Brooks	Sixth collaboration with James L. Brooks

Editorial department
Year	Film	Director	Role	Notes	Other notes
1969	The Rain People	Francis Ford Coppola	Assistant editor	First collaboration with Francis Ford Coppola	
1969	Alice's Restaurant	Arthur Penn	Assistant editor	First collaboration with Arthur Penn	
1970	Little Big Man	Arthur Penn	Associate editor	Second collaboration with Arthur Penn	
1979	Apocalypse Now	Francis Ford Coppola	Supervising editor	Third collaboration with Francis Ford Coppola	
1992	A League of Their Own	Penny Marshall	Editorial consultant	Second collaboration with Penny Marshall	Uncredited
1994	I Love Trouble	Charles Shyer	Additional film editor	Second collaboration with Charles Shyer	
1996	The Crow: City of Angels	Tim Pope	Editorial consultant		
1999	Inspector Gadget	David Kellogg	Additional editor		
2006	The Holiday	Nancy Meyers	Additional film editor		

Producer
Year	Film	Director	Credit	Notes
1986	Jumpin' Jack Flash	Penny Marshall	Associate producer	First collaboration with Penny Marshall
1989	Say Anything...	Cameron Crowe	Co-producer	
1994	I'll Do Anything	James L. Brooks	Associate producer	
1997	As Good as It Gets	James L. Brooks	Co-producer	
2003	My Teacher, My Friend II	David Mickey Evans	Executive producer	
2004	Spanglish	James L. Brooks	Co-producer	
2010	How Do You Know	James L. Brooks	Co-producer	

Second unit director or assistant director
Year	Film	Director	Role
1990	Dick Tracy	Warren Beatty	Second unit director

Sound department
Year	Film	Director	Role
1971	Doc	Frank Perry	Sound editor

Thanks
Year	Film	Director	Role
1982	Flicks	Peter Winograd; Kirk Henderson	Special thanks
1992	A League of Their Own	Penny Marshall	Thanks

Documentaries

Thanks
Year	Film	Director	Role
1991	Hearts of Darkness: A Filmmaker's Apocalypse	Eleanor Coppola; Fax Bahr; George Hickenlooper	Special thanks
2015	Everything Is Copy	Jacob Bernstein; Nick Hooker	Special thanks

TV movies

Editor
Year	Film	Director
1977	The Blue Hotel	Ján Kadár

TV series

Editor
Year	Title	Notes
1976	The American Parade	1 episode
1976−77	Kojak	3 episodes

TV specials

Editor
Year	Title
2002	74th Academy Awards

== Awards ==
Awards
Year	Film	Role
1975	The Godfather Part II	Nominated for a BAFTA
1980	Apocalypse Now	Nominated for Oscar, BAFTA and Eddie
1984	Terms of Endearment	Nominated for Oscar
1988	Broadcast News	Nominated for Oscar and Eddie
1998	As Good as It Gets	Nominated for Oscar and Eddie
