= Carmine Caridi =

American actor (1934–2019)

- Caridi in 1981
- Born: January 23, 1934; New York City, New York, U.S.
- Died: May 28, 2019 (aged 85); Los Angeles, California, U.S.
- Resting place: Calverton National Cemetery
- Occupation: Actor
- Years active: 1962–2019
- Height: 6 ft 4 in (1.93 m)

Carmine Caridi (January 23, 1934 – May 28, 2019) was an American film, television and stage actor. He is best known for his roles in the films The Godfather Part II (1974) and The Godfather Part III (1990).

== Life and career ==
Caridi's most notable film roles are Carmine Rosato in The Godfather Part II (1974) and Albert Volpe in The Godfather Part III (1990).

According to studio executive Robert Evans in his 1994 memoir The Kid Stays in the Picture, Caridi was director Francis Ford Coppola's first choice for the role of Sonny Corleone, but Evans insisted on James Caan because Caridi was too tall to play opposite Al Pacino. However, according to author Mark Seal in his 2022 book Leave the Gun, Take the Cannoli, Caan had been Coppola's choice from the start, who had major battles with Evans over this and other major casting decisions for The Godfather. In Mark Seal's account, Coppola attended theatre arts school with Caan and directed him, along with actor Robert Duvall, in the film The Rain People.

Caridi appeared in the cult movie Kiss Meets the Phantom of the Park (1978), playing amusement park manager Calvin Richards, and appeared as Sam Giancana in the 1992 film Ruby.

On television, he portrayed Dan Valenti on Phyllis from 1976 to 1977. In 1978, he appeared as Di Carlo in the episode "The Intimate Friends of Janet Wilde" of the series The Eddie Capra Mysteries. Between 1982 and 1983, Caridi played Angelo Martelli, Bruno Martelli's father, in the TV series Fame. Caridi played Detective Vince Gotelli in the television series NYPD Blue from 1993 to 1999. Though he was never credited as part of the main cast, Caridi appeared in fifteen episodes of Blue and his character was the primary focus of several episodes.

Caridi's final appearance was a small role in the Season 10 episode of Curb Your Enthusiasm, "Insufficient Praise." Later on the season, Larry David's character is accused of allowing Caridi's Academy screener DVDs to be pirated.

=== Copyright infringement incident ===
On January 13, 2004, the Academy of Motion Picture Arts and Sciences announced that it had identified a copy of the film Something's Gotta Give, circulated illegally on the Internet, as carrying markings identifying it as coming from a VHS screener copy sent to Caridi because he was an Oscar voter. Similarly, unauthorized copies of The Last Samurai, Mystic River, Big Fish and Master and Commander: The Far Side of the World were said to have been traced to Caridi.

The FBI began an investigation into the affair and later that month charged Russell Sprague of Homewood, Illinois, with criminal copyright infringement. Federal authorities alleged that for at least three years, Caridi had given Sprague his screener copies of approximately 60 movies seeking consideration for the Academy Awards. According to the FBI affidavit, Caridi said that he sent his screeners via FedEx to Sprague, who gave him FedEx boxes, pre-addressed labels, and an account number. Caridi denied receiving money from Sprague, telling the FBI he believed that Sprague was a film buff.

Caridi and Sprague were sued by Sony and Time Warner on civil charges of copyright infringement. The studios filed the suit in the United States District Court for the Central District of California in Los Angeles, seeking damages of a minimum of $150,000 per movie, with hundreds of individual violations alleged. Sprague pleaded guilty in his criminal case but died of a suspected heart attack while awaiting sentencing. Caridi was cleared of criminal wrongdoing.

However, the Academy of Motion Picture Arts and Sciences announced on February 3, 2004, that it was expelling Caridi for violating his agreement to safeguard their screeners, making him the first Academy member to be expelled.

=== Death ===
Caridi was hospitalized at Cedars-Sinai Medical Center in Los Angeles after suffering from complications due to a fall, where he slipped into a comatose state and died on May 28, 2019.

== Filmography ==
Year	Title	Role	Notes
1971	The Anderson Tapes	Detective A	
1971	The Gang That Couldn't Shoot Straight	Tony 'The Indian'	
1972	Irish Whiskey Rebellion	Marty	
1973	I Could Never Have Sex with Any Man Who Has So Little Regard for My Husband	Marvin	
1974	Crazy Joe	'Jelly'	
1974	The Gambler	Jimmy	
1974	The Godfather Part II	Carmine Rosato	
1976	Hollywood Man	Anthony	
1976	Car Wash	Foolish Father	
1978	The Cheap Detective	Sergeant Crosseti	
1978	Kiss Meets the Phantom of the Park	Calvin Richards	
1978	Mr. Too Little	Officer Murphy	
1978	The Eddie Capra Mysteries	Inspector Chuck Di Carlo	Episode: "The Intimate Friends of Janet Wilde"
1979	The In-Laws	Angie	
1981	Prince of the City	Detective Gino Mascone	
1981	Taxi (TV series)	Lou Lou	Episode “On the Job”
1985	Brewster's Millions	Salvino	
1985	Summer Rental	Ed	
1986	The Money Pit	Brad Shirk	
1987	Some Kind of Wonderful	Museum Guard	
1988	Split Decisions	Lou Rubia	
1990	The Godfather Part III	Albert Volpe	
1990	Havana	Captain Potts	
1991	Life Stinks	Flophouse Owner	
1991	Femme Fatale	Dino	
1991	Bugsy	Frank Costello	
1992	Ruby	Sam Giancana	
1995	Top Dog	Lou Swanson	
1997	The Good Bad Guy	Tony Fusciacca	
1998	Money Play$	Victor	
1999	Splendor Falls	Vito	
1999	Carlo's Wake	Uncle Nick	
2000	18 D	Frank	
2002	Do It for Uncle Manny	Liquor Store Owner	
2003	Nobody Knows Anything!	Frankie C.	
2003	Runaways	Officer Brady	
2008	Wednesday Again	Rudy	
2015	Rivers 9	Romeo	
2018	Frank and Ava	Carmine	
2018	I'll Be Next Door for Christmas	Ancient Man	
2020	Curb Your Enthusiasm	Uncle Murray / Moke	Posthumous release
