= The Godfather (1991 video game) =

1991 video game

- Developer: Creative Materials
- Publisher: U.S. Gold
- Programmers: Richard Aplin; Tim Cannell
- Artist: Pete Lyon
- Composer: Justin Scharvona
- Series: The Godfather
- Platforms: Amiga, Atari ST, MS-DOS
- Release: NA: 1991
- Genre: Run and gun
- Mode: Single-player

The Godfather is a side-scrolling run and gun video game released by U.S. Gold in 1991 for the Amiga, Atari ST, and MS-DOS. A Master System version was cancelled. The plot is based on the three Godfather films. There are five levels which reflect the locations seen in the movies, including the streets of New York City, Miami, and the village of Corleone in Sicily.

== Gameplay ==
The Godfather is a side-scrolling run and gun game with occasional first-person sequences. The player walks along the street, shooting enemy gangsters while avoiding shooting innocent people. Each level ends with a boss, as well as brief mini games. The final level consists of taking down an enemy helicopter while protecting Michael Corleone.

== Reception ==
Critical reception to the Amiga version was mixed, ranging from 40% to 95%.

Amiga Computing praised its graphics (five out of five stars), but panned both its gameplay and addictiveness (one star each) and awarded it a below-average 40% overall.
