= Barry Malkin =

American film editor (1938–2019)

- Born: October 26, 1938; New York City, U.S.
- Died: April 4, 2019 (aged 80); New York City, U.S.
- Occupation: Editor
- Years active: 1964–2004
- Spouse: Stephanie Byer Malkin

Barry M. Malkin (October 26, 1938 – April 4, 2019) was an American film editor with about 30 film credits. He is noted for his extended collaboration with director Francis Ford Coppola, having edited most of Coppola's films from 1969 to 1997. In particular, Malkin worked with Coppola on four of the component and compilation films of the Godfather trilogy, though he did not edit the first film, The Godfather. Film critic Roger Ebert called the first two Godfather films a "cultural bedrock".

== Early career ==
Malkin worked as an apprentice to editor Dede Allen on the film America America (directed by Elia Kazan, 1962), and became acquainted with editor Aram Avakian, who was an occasional visitor. Malkin became Avakian's assistant editor on Lilith (directed by Robert Rossen, 1964). Malkin got his first credits as a full editor on The Patty Duke Show (TV) and on the "Z movie" The Fat Spy (1966). Francis Ford Coppola heard of Malkin from Avakian, who had edited Coppola's film You're a Big Boy Now (1966); it turned out that Malkin and Coppola had been acquainted as teenagers growing up in the same Queens neighborhood. Coppola engaged Malkin to edit his fourth film as director, The Rain People (1969). He worked as an associate editor on two additional films edited by Robert Q. Lovett: End of the Road (directed by Aram Avakian-1970), and Cotton Comes to Harlem (directed by Ossie Davis-1970). Malkin was the editor for the 1973 film directed by Avakian, Cops and Robbers.

== The Godfather and the 1970s ==
The Godfather was extremely successful artistically and at the box office; among other distinctions, it won the Academy Award for Best Picture for 1972. Production of a sequel, The Godfather Part II, started in 1973. William Reynolds and Peter Zinner had edited The Godfather, and been nominated for the Academy Award for Best Film Editing for their work. For the sequel, Malkin and Richard Marks joined Zinner as co-editors. Godfather Part II, which was released in 1974 and enjoyed success comparable to The Godfather, is noted for its intercutting between two storylines, one from Sicily in the early 20th century, and a second contemporary story that follows the first film's action. Long afterwards, the film was listed as the 22nd best-edited film of all time in a 2012 survey of members of the Motion Picture Editors Guild.

Coppola subsequently asked Malkin to edit The Godfather Saga (1977), a television miniseries, that was based on the two films. The miniseries incorporated scenes that could not be included in the original versions, and replaced the complex intercutting between time periods of the original films with a more straightforward chronological ordering.

Malkin was an additional editor for Apocalypse Now (1979), and a supervising editor for the Coppola-produced film Hammett (directed by Wim Wenders, 1982). In this period, Malkin also edited Four Friends (1981), which was directed by Arthur Penn. Dede Allen had edited Penn's films since Bonnie and Clyde (1967), but was unavailable for this film. Stephen Prince has written of the contrast between them: "the difference an editor makes on a director's films is evident by comparing his more linear approach to Dede Allen's fractured and off-center cutting".

== 1980s and 1990s ==
During the 1980s Malkin edited six of Coppola's films, from Rumble Fish (1983) through The Godfather Part III (1990). He was joined by his former mentor Robert Q. Lovett for The Cotton Club (1984), which garnered the two editors a nomination for the Academy Award. Malkin also edited the film Big (1988) that was directed by Penny Marshall. By the end of the decade Coppola had agreed to make The Godfather Part III (1990), and brought in Malkin, Lisa Fruchtman, and Walter Murch to edit. Malkin and Murch then edited a compilation entitled The Godfather Trilogy: 1901–1980 that was released to video in 1992. The compilation included footage from the theatrically released versions of all three films as well as additional footage. A 1993 review in Time reads, "This trilogy has a novelistic density, a rueful, unhurried lyricism and a depth that, singly, the films could not achieve. Altogether glorious."

In the 1990s, in addition to his work with Coppola on Jack (1996) and The Rainmaker (1997), Malkin edited four films with director Andrew Bergman. Their first film together, The Freshman (1992), is to some extent a comic "sendup" of the original 1972 Godfather film, including a part played by Marlon Brando. Malkin's last credit was for The Big Bounce (2004), which was directed by George Armitage.

== Awards ==
Malkin, Marks, and Zinner were nominated for the BAFTA Award for Best Editing for The Godfather: Part II (1974). The film was listed as the 22nd best-edited film of all time in a 2012 survey of members of the Motion Picture Editors Guild. He and Robert Q. Lovett were nominated for the Academy Award for Best Film Editing for The Cotton Club (1984). Malkin, Murch, and Fruchtman were nominated for the Academy Award for editing The Godfather Part III (1990). Malkin was selected for membership in the American Cinema Editors.

== Filmography (as editor) ==
Filmography based on Oldham's book and the Internet Movie Database.

Editor
Year	Film	Director	Notes
1964	Act of Reprisal	Erricos Andreou; Robert Tronson	
1966	The Fat Spy	Joseph Cates	
1969	The Rain People	Francis Ford Coppola	First collaboration with Francis Ford Coppola
1971	Who Is Harry Kellerman and Why Is He Saying Those Terrible Things About Me?	Ulu Grosbard	
1973	Cops and Robbers	Aram Avakian	Second collaboration with Aram Avakian
1974	The Godfather Part II	Francis Ford Coppola	Second collaboration with Francis Ford Coppola
1976	One Summer Love	Gilbert Cates	
1978	Somebody Killed Her Husband	Lamont Johnson	
1979	Last Embrace	Jonathan Demme	
1980	Windows	Gordon Willis	
1980	One-Trick Pony	Robert M. Young	
1981	Four Friends	Arthur Penn	Second collaboration with Arthur Penn
1983	Rumble Fish	Francis Ford Coppola	Fourth collaboration with Francis Ford Coppola
1984	The Cotton Club	Francis Ford Coppola	Fifth collaboration with Francis Ford Coppola
1986	Peggy Sue Got Married	Francis Ford Coppola	Sixth collaboration with Francis Ford Coppola
1987	Gardens of Stone	Francis Ford Coppola	Seventh collaboration with Francis Ford Coppola
1988	Big	Penny Marshall	
1989	New York Stories	Francis Ford Coppola	"Life Without Zoë" segment Eighth collaboration with Francis Ford Coppola
1990	The Freshman	Andrew Bergman	First collaboration with Andrew Bergman
1990	The Godfather Part III	Francis Ford Coppola	Ninth collaboration with Francis Ford Coppola
1992	Honeymoon in Vegas	Andrew Bergman	Second collaboration with Andrew Bergman
1994	It Could Happen to You	Andrew Bergman	Third collaboration with Andrew Bergman
1996	Jack	Francis Ford Coppola	Tenth collaboration with Francis Ford Coppola
1997	The Rainmaker	Francis Ford Coppola	Eleventh collaboration with Francis Ford Coppola
2000	Isn't She Great	Andrew Bergman	Fourth collaboration with Andrew Bergman
2000	Lucky Numbers	Nora Ephron	
2004	The Big Bounce	George Armitage	

Editorial department
Year	Film	Director	Role	Notes
1964	Lilith	Robert Rossen	Assistant editor	
1970	End of the Road	Aram Avakian	Associate editor	First collaboration with Aram Avakian
1970	Cotton Comes to Harlem	Ossie Davis	Associate editor	
1979	Apocalypse Now	Francis Ford Coppola	Additional editor	Tenth collaboration with Francis Ford Coppola
1982	Hammett	Wim Wenders	Supervising editor	
1990	Meet the Applegates	Michael Lehmann	Editorial consultant	

Additional crew
Year	Film	Director	Role	Notes	Ref.
1970	Little Big Man	Arthur Penn	Opening and closing credits	First collaboration with Arthur Penn	

Direct-to-video films

Editor
Year	Film	Director
1992	The Godfather Trilogy: 1901–1980	Francis Ford Coppola

TV movies

Editor
Year	Film	Director
1977	The Godfather Saga	Francis Ford Coppola

TV series

Editor
Year	Title	Notes
1963	The Patty Duke Show	1 episode
1977	The Godfather Saga	
