= Osvaldo Altobello =

Fictional character from The Godfather series

- Eli Wallach portraying Don Altobello
- First appearance: The Godfather Part III
- Last appearance: The Godfather's Revenge
- Created by: Mario Puzo
- Portrayed by: Eli Wallach

In-universe information
- Nickname: Ozzie
- Gender: Male
- Title: Boss; Consigliere; Capo
- Occupation: Mobster
- Family: Tattaglia
- Spouse: Unnamed wife
- Children: Various daughters
- Relatives: One nephew known

Osvaldo "Ozzie" Altobello is a fictional character and the main antagonist of the 1990 film The Godfather Part III. In the film, he is portrayed by Eli Wallach.

== Casting ==
Frank Sinatra biographer Tom Santopietro notes that Francis Ford Coppola approached Sinatra to play Altobello. The singer considered accepting the role, but was not keen on the heavy shooting schedule. Ultimately, his wife Barbara talked him out of it.

== Appearances ==
=== The Godfather Part III ===
Altobello is an aging gangster and longstanding ally of the Corleone crime family. He is an influential member and liaison of the Sicilian Mafia in New York City and an old friend of the Corleone family. He is also a member of Propaganda Due (P2). By the time of The Godfather III, he has become a close friend and ally of Michael Corleone's. Altobello even donates one million dollars to be a part of the Vito Andolini Corleone Foundation. Aside from being Michael's associate, Altobello is Connie Corleone's godfather.

Altobello wants in on Michael's investments as he attempts to complete his family's move from crime-based profits to legitimate business. Altobello skillfully hides his nefarious intentions, but Michael grows suspicious after Joey Zasa, a Corleone family rival, orchestrates an assassination attempt on Michael and other family heads assembled for a Commission meeting in Atlantic City. Altobello had left the conference room just prior to the attack. Michael escapes unharmed, but many others are killed. Michael instructs his nephew Vincent Corleone to approach Altobello pretending to pledge his allegiance to Altobello, without promising to betray Michael.

While in Sicily, Altobello enlists a legendary, aged assassin named Mosca to kill Michael. He plans the attack for when Michael's son, Anthony, is performing in Cavalleria Rusticana at Teatro Massimo in Palermo. Before the performance, Connie presents Altobello with a box of cannoli as a birthday gift. He takes one from the box and offers Connie the first bite. She takes a small taste, seemingly calming his suspicions. Altobello eats the rest of the poisoned cannoli throughout the performance and dies in his seat as Connie watches through her opera glasses.

== Sequel novels ==
Altobello is a supporting character in the novels The Godfather Returns and The Godfather's Revenge, set before the events of The Godfather Part III.

== Other ==
- Grand Theft Auto: Liberty City Stories - Uncle Leone is based on Don Altobello.

== Sources ==
- Santopietro, Tom (November 11, 2008). Sinatra in Hollywood. St. Martin's Press. ISBN 978-0-312-36226-3.
