= Tom Santopietro =

American author and Broadway theater manager

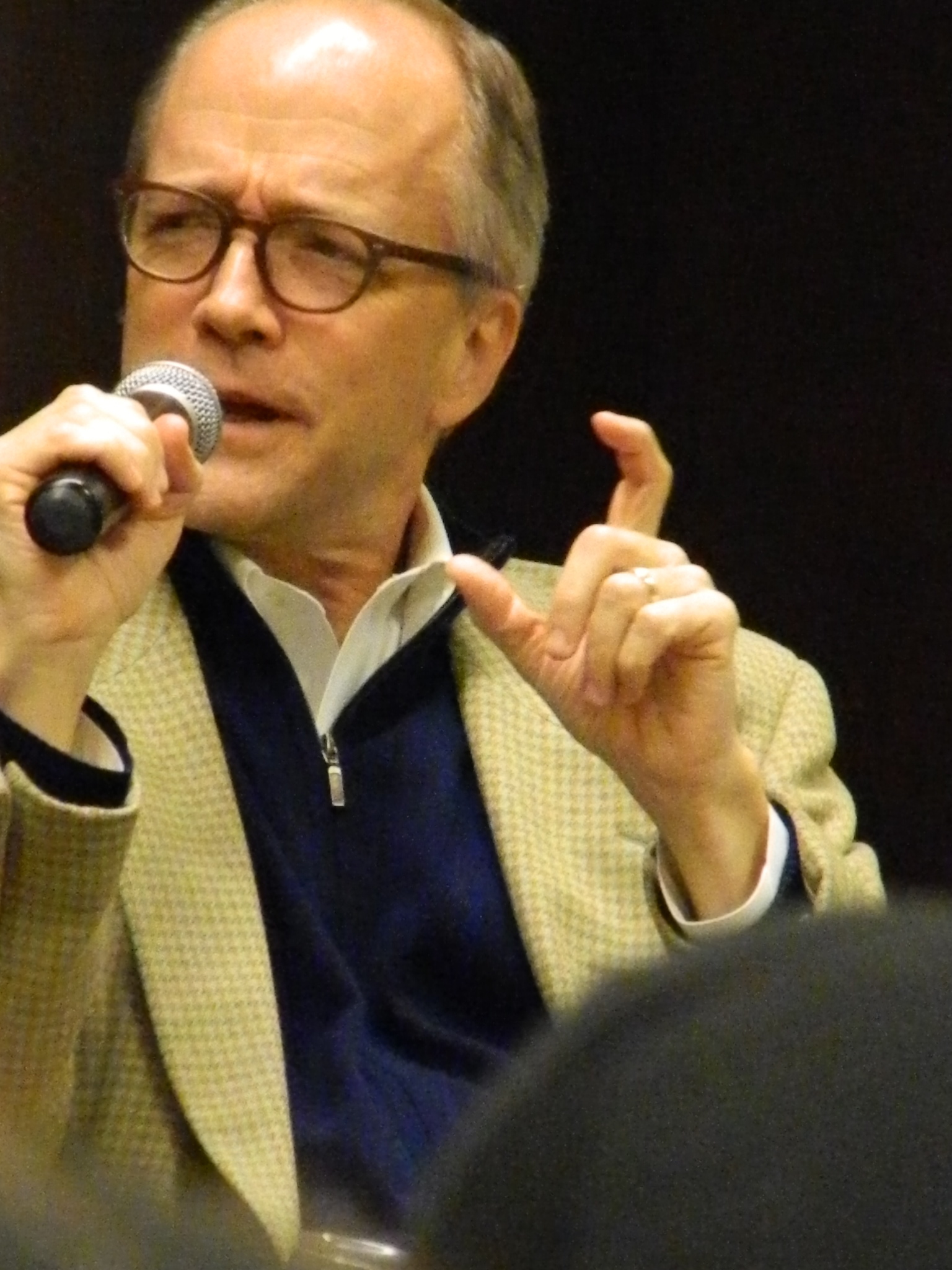
- Santopietro visiting New York, 2013
- Born: Waterbury, Connecticut, U.S.
- Occupations: Author; producer; Broadway theater manager
- Writing career
- Genres: Biography, American culture

Tom Santopietro is an American author and Broadway theater manager. He worked for 25 years in the New York theater scene, managing over 30 Broadway shows.

Tom Santopietro is the author of five books: The Sound of Music Story, The Godfather Effect: Changing Hollywood, America, and Me, Sinatra in Hollywood, Considering Doris Day (a New York Times Book Review Editor's Choice), and The Importance of Being Barbra. A frequent media commentator in programs ranging from the PBS documentary The Italian Americans to the Jimmy van Heusen biography Swingin' With Frank & Bing, Tom conducts monthly interviews for Barnes and Noble and lectures on classic films. Over the past thirty years he has managed more than two dozen Broadway shows.

== Early life ==
Santopietro was born in Waterbury, Connecticut. His paternal grandfather and grandmother, Orazio Santopietro and Maria Victoria Valleta, emigrated to the U.S. from Italy at an early age. Orazio was only 13, and arrived in America with twenty lira in his pocket. Together, Orazio and Maria Victoria opened a grocery store on Waterbury's Division Street. Santopietro's father, Olindo Oreste Santopietro, was a successful physician who also achieved an MBA. His mother, Nancy Edge Parker, supported many arts and civic projects, and was president of the Waterbury Junior League.

== Education ==
Santopietro graduated from the Taft School and was editor-in-chief of its school newspaper, The Papyrus. He then graduated from Trinity College and the University of Connecticut Law School.

== Broadway theater ==
After graduating from the University of Connecticut School of Law, Santopietro worked on Broadway shows as a stage and company manager. He handled the business affairs of major Broadway hits for 25 years and managed over 30 shows including The Iceman Cometh, Blithe Spirit, The Impossible Dream, Jersey Boys, In the Heights, and Noises Off.

When working as a company manager, he dealt with the actors, the Actor's Equity trade union, and a completely different payroll system. He even had to break up the occasional fistfight in the audience.

== Authorship ==
As a biographer, Santopietro wrote in-depth studies of several Hollywood icons, who reflected and defined the American cultural landscape. These included Doris Day (Considering Doris Day), Barbra Streisand (The Importance of Being Barbra), and an account of Frank Sinatra's Hollywood film career (Sinatra in Hollywood).

Santopietro's latest book, The Sound of Music Story: How A Beguiling Young Novice, A Handsome Austrian Captain, and Ten Singing Von Trapp Children Inspired the Most Beloved Film of All Time, is a behind-the-scenes chronicle of the filming of The Sound of Music in Austria and Hollywood. It reviews the real-life story of Maria von Trapp, the critical controversy which greeted the movie, the film's relationship to the turbulent 1960s, and the super stardom which engulfed Julie Andrews in its immediate aftermath. Santopietro also provides a historian's critical analysis of the careers of director Robert Wise and screenwriter Ernest Lehman.

Santopietro's The Godfather Effect, was a study of the Godfather films - as well as Mario Puzo's novel - and their effect on American culture. According to Santopietro, The Godfather was a turning point in American cultural consciousness. With its emphasis on proud ethnicity, The Godfather changed not just the way Italian-Americans saw themselves, but how Americans of all backgrounds viewed their individual and national self-identities, their possibilities, and attendant disappointments.

The Godfather Effect was widely reviewed, and well received by the press. The Hollywood Reporter called it "a beautiful narrative of the way pop culture shapes our self-image."

The Wall Street Journal declared that "part memoir, part devotional film essay and part reflection on the meaning of ethnicity in American life, The Godfather Effect defines how the Godfather movies, along with the 1969 Mario Puzo novel from which they were adapted, reflected the madness, glory and failure of the American dream. By exploring that dream in distinctly Italian-American terms, the movies succeeded in delivering nothing less than the Italianization of American culture. In other words, they were so cool that everyone wanted to seem a little Italian."

Newsday appreciated the personal dimension in Santopietro's book, noting, "In the end, it's the personal moments, such as Santopietro taking his aging dad to revisit the field where he played baseball as a child, that are most rewarding. The films make up the shell of The Godfather Effect, but it's the connections with family that give it a center as sweet as cannoli cream."

== That's Life! ==
External videos
- You can watch a video of Tom Santopietro and Tony DeSare in The Best is Yet to Come here

External videos
- You can watch a video of Tom Santopietro and Billy Stritch in Sentimental Journey: A Tribute to Doris Day here

Over the years, Santopietro developed and produced a succession of cabaret shows which commemorate Frank Sinatra, Doris Day, and other legendary American performers. These shows travelled and sold out all over the United States, and received extensive press coverage including The New York Times.

The Best is Yet to Come was a tribute to the musical legacy of Frank Sinatra.

Sentimental Journey: A Tribute to Doris Day, written and staged by Santopietro, was a collaboration between Santopietro and composer Billy Stritch.

In his latest show, That's Life!, Santopietro and singer/pianist Tony DeSare saluted the Italian-American singers Tony Bennett, Dean Martin and Frank Sinatra.

That's Life! was hailed as "an informative, entertaining mix of Santopietro's anecdote-packed mini-bios of the famous singers segueing back-and-forth with DeSare's renditions of classic songs forever associated with the three pop bel canto masters."
