= The Godfather Saga =

1977 television miniseries directed by Francis Ford Coppola

- Written by: Mario Puzo; Francis Ford Coppola
- Directed by: Francis Ford Coppola
- Starring: Marlon Brando; Al Pacino; Robert Duvall; James Caan; Diane Keaton; Robert De Niro; Sterling Hayden; John Cazale; Talia Shire; Lee Strasberg
- Music by: Nino Rota; Carmine Coppola
- Original languages: English; Sicilian

Production
- Producers: Albert S. Ruddy; Francis Ford Coppola
- Cinematography: Gordon Willis
- Editor: Barry Malkin
- Running time: 434 minutes
- Production companies: Paramount Television; American Zoetrope

Original release
- Network: NBC
- Release: November 12 – November 15, 1977

The Godfather Saga^{[a]} is a 1977 American television miniseries that combines The Godfather and The Godfather Part II into a single unified work. It originally aired on NBC over four consecutive nights (one three-hour episode and three two-hour episodes) in November 1977.

The television version was the basis for a few subsequent video releases. A shorter version of the miniseries was released in 1981. In 1990 a new release added additional scenes and reincorporated much of the footage added for television. Following the release of The Godfather Part III in 1990, a third unified version was released to video in 1992.

== Structure ==
Francis Ford Coppola asked his editor Barry Malkin to make a seven-hour version for television; Coppola reportedly did this project to raise money for Apocalypse Now, which was severely over-budget at the time. The resulting film was in chronological order. The Godfather Part II had cut back and forth between scenes in the early 1900s and the late 1950s, and was therefore both a prequel and a sequel to The Godfather. Malkin also toned down the violence, sex, and language for a television audience.

The television series incorporated additional footage not included in the original films, including Don Fanucci being attacked by street thugs, Vito Corleone's first encounter with Hyman Roth, Vito killing two of the mafiosi who worked for Don Ciccio and were instrumental in his family's death, Michael Corleone's reunion with his father after his return from Sicily, Sonny Corleone's taking charge of the family after his father is severely wounded, and Michael's vengeance upon Fabrizio for killing Apollonia. The previously deleted scenes totaled almost 75 minutes.

Hal Erickson summarized the results as follows, "While this rearrangement was reasonably coherent, the rhythm and pacing of the original theatrical versions of the two films was severely damaged. The inclusion of scenes previously removed from the theatrical prints also stretched out what was already an overlong project. Even allowing for the achievement of pulling off this gargantuan editing assignment, The Godfather Saga is a lumpy affair which seems to stop and start at irregular intervals and never truly picks up momentum."

=== Nielsen ratings ===
According to the entry in Les Brown's Encyclopedia of Television, the Nielsen ratings for the series were supposedly not as high as expected, possibly because both films had already aired (albeit separately) on NBC in previous years.

== Censored scenes ==
Both the 1977 The Godfather: The Complete Novel for Television and the 2012 The Godfather: A Novel for Television have had multiple scenes edited to remove violence and nudity.

=== The Godfather censored scenes ===
The following censored scenes are listed chronologically.

- The scene when Woltz finds the horse head in his bed.
- The scene when Luca Brasi is strangled.
- The scene when Sonny beats up Carlo in the street.
- The scene when Michael kisses and undresses Apollonia on their wedding night.
- The scene when Sonny is murdered.
- The scene when Moe Greene is murdered.
- The scene when Willi Cicci kills Don Cuneo.
- The scene when Neri kills Don Barzini.
- The scene when Clemenza kills Carlo.

=== The Godfather Part II censored scenes ===
The following scenes are listed chronologically.

- The scene when baby Fredo is treated for pneumonia.
- The scene when Vito kills Fanucci.
- The scene when Vito kills Don Ciccio.
- The scene when the Rosato brothers try to kill Pentangeli.
- The scene when Geary pulls the covers off the murdered prostitute.
- The scene when the Cuban policeman kills Bussetta.

== The Godfather 1902–1959: The Complete Epic ==
The Godfather 1902–1959: The Complete Epic is a reduced, 386-minute version of The Godfather Saga (434 minutes) that was released to video in 1981. Unlike the Saga, which was presented in four segments (each with opening and closing credits), the Epic is presented as a single segment. Lucia Bozzola wrote of this version, "With the freedom of home video, The Complete Epic reinstated the violence that had been edited for television; free of commercial breaks, the narrative drive of Part I was mostly restored, but the impact of Part II was still muted by the separation of Vito's rise from Michael's descent."

== The Godfather: The Epic 1901–1959 ==
The Godfather: The Epic 1901–1959 is a 423-minute version of The Godfather Saga that was released to video in 1990 in Europe. This version has commonly been misunderstood to simply be a European re-release of The Godfather 1902–1959: The Complete Epic however this is not the case, as it contains far more deleted scenes and includes more deleted scenes than both The Godfather 1902–1959: The Complete Epic and The Godfather Trilogy: 1901–1980 with many scenes that were previously exclusive to The Godfather Saga (434 minutes) being included. It contains the same number of deleted scenes as Mario Puzo's The Godfather: The Complete Epic 1901–1959 which was released by HBO in 2016, differing mainly by the end credits scene, as The Godfather: The Epic 1901–1959 contains the scene of Kay lighting candles which was previously exclusive to The Godfather Saga.

== The Godfather Trilogy: 1901–1980 ==
The Godfather Trilogy: 1901–1980
- Directed by: Francis Ford Coppola
- Written by: Mario Puzo; Francis Ford Coppola
- Produced by: Albert S. Ruddy; Francis Ford Coppola
- Starring: Marlon Brando; Al Pacino; Robert Duvall; James Caan; Diane Keaton; Robert De Niro; John Cazale; Talia Shire
- Cinematography: Gordon Willis
- Edited by: Barry Malkin; Walter Murch
- Music by: Nino Rota; Carmine Coppola
- Release date: 1992
- Running time: 583 minutes
- Languages: English; Sicilian

Following the release of The Godfather Part III in 1990, Coppola, Barry Malkin, and Walter Murch edited the three Godfather movies into chronological order to make the film The Godfather Trilogy: 1901–1980. As had the earlier compilations, this film incorporated scenes that are not part of the theatrical releases. It was released on VHS and laserdisc in 1992; it has not been released on DVD, and is now rare. The total run time for this version is 583 minutes (9 hours, 43 minutes). There were reviews of this version of the film that were favorable. A Time review reads, "This trilogy has a novelistic density, a rueful, unhurried lyricism and a depth that, singly, the films could not achieve. Altogether glorious."

== The Godfather: A Novel for Television ==
On March 3, 2012, the American cable television channel AMC marked the 40th anniversary of the original theatrical release of The Godfather by re-broadcasting The Godfather Saga. It marked the first time the Saga was broadcast in high definition. This showing lacked some 1977 exclusive scenes, with some scenes also having a few seconds trimmed off compared to the 1977 broadcast.

== The Godfather: The Complete Epic 1901–1959 ==
In January 2016, HBO aired the Epic in its uncut and uncensored format, later making it available on its streaming platforms. The HBO showing contained most of the known deleted scenes, thereby lengthening the runtime of the Epic from its video release to 423 minutes. This version carries the title Mario Puzo's The Godfather: The Complete Epic 1901–1959. It was available to watch through Amazon under the title The Godfather Epic.

== Notes ==
^{a} Also known as The Godfather: The Complete Novel for Television, The Godfather: A Novel for Television, The Godfather Novella, The Godfather: The Epic 1901–1959, The Godfather 1901–1959: The Complete Epic, and The Godfather Epic (on HBO).
