= The Rain People =

1969 film by Francis Ford Coppola

- Theatrical release poster
- Directed by: Francis Ford Coppola
- Written by: Francis Ford Coppola
- Produced by: Ronald Colby; Bart Patton
- Starring: Shirley Knight; James Caan; Robert Duvall; Marya Zimmet
- Cinematography: Bill Butler (Note: Credited as 'Wilmer Butler'.)
- Edited by: Barry Malkin
- Music by: Ronald Stein
- Production company: American Zoetrope
- Distributed by: Warner Bros.-Seven Arts
- Release dates: August 27, 1969 (San Sebastián); August 27, 1969 (U.S.)
- Running time: 101 minutes
- Country: United States
- Language: English
- Budget: $750,000

The Rain People is a 1969 American road drama film written and directed by Francis Ford Coppola, and starring Shirley Knight, James Caan and Robert Duvall. The film centers on a middle-class housewife (Knight), who runs away from her husband after learning that she is pregnant; she then crosses paths with a hitchhiker (Caan).

Coppola's fourth directorial work, The Rain People was released by Warner Bros.-Seven Arts on August 27, 1969, and received generally positive reviews from critics. It won the Golden Shell at the 1969 San Sebastian Film Festival.

== Plot ==
Long Island housewife Natalie Ravenna leaves her husband sleeping at home and sets off on a road trip in the family station wagon. She visits her parents, who are upset with her. At a gas station payphone, Natalie makes a collect call to her husband and tells him that she is pregnant. He is thrilled with the news, but she tells him that she needs some time away from him.

Natalie gives a ride to a strapping young man, Jimmy "Killer" Kilgannon, who had been a college football star but sustained a serious head injury and was given a thousand dollars to leave the school. On their first night together, in Natalie's motel room, she orders Killer around and makes him show her his muscular body. Noting that he is completely obedient, she tells him that she is pregnant and had picked him up for a potential one-night stand, but instead sends him to his own room.

Natalie drives Killer to the home of a one-time girlfriend of his, whose father had once promised him a job, but his ex wants nothing to do with him because of his injury. Natalie reluctantly takes Killer as she travels west. She finds him a work-and-board arrangement taking care of farm animals. The manager, Mr. Alfred, insists on safeguarding his thousand dollars. Natalie hastily leaves and is stopped by a motorcycle highway patrolman, Gordon, who issues a speeding ticket but buys her coffee. Natalie has to pay the ticket at the farm, where she finds that Killer has been opening cages to set countless animals free. She convinces Alfred to drop criminal charges in exchange for $800 of Killer's cash.

Natalie prepares for a date with Gordon and unsuccessfully pleads with Killer for some privacy. She makes a collect call to her husband, who says he will support her and her choice to have an abortion if she comes home. Killer breaks the payphone line, inciting her to leave him once and for all. Later, she accompanies Gordon to his trailer. He proves to be an unstable widower who takes poor care of his adolescent daughter, Rosalie, whom he allows to prowl around outside to gain a couple hours of peace. He tells Natalie that his wife died in a fire, but dubiously claims that he had fallen out of love with her. Meanwhile, Rosalie encounters Killer and they wander the lot together and spy through trailer windows. Natalie tries to leave, but Gordon blocks her exit and attempts to rape her. Killer intervenes and beats Gordon without restraint, prompting Rosalie to fatally shoot him. Natalie holds Killer's body as she sobs and tells him that he can stay with her and her husband.

== Cast ==
- James Caan as Jimmy "Killer" Kilgannon
- Shirley Knight as Natalie Ravenna
- Robert Duvall as Gordon
- Marya Zimmet as Rosalie
- Tom Aldredge as Mr. Alfred
- Laura Crews as Ellen
- Andrew Duncan as Artie
- Margaret Fairchild as Marion
- Sally Gracie as Beth
- Alan Manson as Lou
- Robert Modica as Vinny Ravenna
- Eleanor Coppola as Gordon's Wife (uncredited)

== Production ==
=== Casting ===
Rip Torn was originally cast as Gordon, but was replaced during filming by Robert Duvall. At the time, Duvall and James Caan were roommates and were doing a few films together. They and Coppola worked together again on The Godfather (1972).

During filming, Shirley Knight was actually pregnant with her second child, Sophie.

=== Filming ===
The Rain People was shot over the course of five months, across 18 different states. To minimize transportation costs, Coppola employed a small 10-person crew, which was supplemented by local hires in each of the locations.

Filming locations included:

- Brule, Nebraska
- Chattanooga, Tennessee
- Clarksburg, West Virginia
- Colorado
- Garden City, New York
- Harrisonburg, Virginia
- Hofstra University, Nassau County, New York
- New York City, New York
- Ogallala, Nebraska
- Pennsylvania
- Weston, West Virginia

=== Editing ===
The rough cut of the film was over 4 hours long, before Coppola and editor Barry Malkin cut it to under 2.

== Release ==
The film premiered at the San Sebastián International Film Festival on June 24, 1969, where it won the Golden Shell grand prize. It was released in the United States by Warner Bros.-Seven Arts on August 27, 1969.

=== Home media ===
The film has been released on DVD and Blu-ray through the Warner Archive Collection.

== Reception ==
=== Critical reception ===
On the review aggregator website Rotten Tomatoes, 88% of 16 critics' reviews are positive, with an average rating of 6.6/10. Metacritic, which uses a weighted average, assigned the film a score of 66 out of 100, based on 10 critics, indicating "generally favorable" reviews.

Roger Ebert of the Chicago Sun-Times gave the film four stars out of four and compared Natalie Ravenna's quest to that of the Peter Fonda character in Easy Rider, and called them both "lineal descendants of the most typical American searcher of them all, Huckleberry Finn." He concluded: "It's difficult to say whether his film is successful or not. That's the beautiful thing about a lot of the new, experimental American directors. They'd rather do interesting things and make provocative observations than try to outflank John Ford on his way to the Great American Movie."

According to TVGuide.com: "This odd odyssey was not a hit, even though over the years it has been regarded as one of Coppola's more personal pictures and has attained a limited following." Margarita Landazuri writes on Turner Classic Movies: "It has acquired a cult status as an early feminist film for its provocative treatment of a woman seeking her own identity."

In 2009, actor and filmmaker Vincent Gallo cited The Rain People as his favorite film. In 2015, David Canfield for IndieWire named The Rain People as one of Coppola's five best films, calling it "hypnotic". FilmInk said "If you don’t think Caan was a great actor, go see The Rain People first, then try arguing that position."

=== Awards and nominations ===
- 1969 Golden Shell (San Sebastián International Film Festival)

== Documentary ==
Coppola's friend and fellow director George Lucas worked as his assistant on this film, and made a short 1968 documentary titled Filmmaker (full title: Filmmaker: a diary by george lucas) about the making of the film.
