= The Godfather Part III =

1990 film by Francis Ford Coppola

- Theatrical release poster
- Directed by: Francis Ford Coppola
- Written by: Mario Puzo; Francis Ford Coppola
- Produced by: Francis Ford Coppola
- Starring: Al Pacino; Diane Keaton; Talia Shire; Andy Garcia; Eli Wallach; Joe Mantegna; Bridget Fonda; George Hamilton; Sofia Coppola
- Cinematography: Gordon Willis
- Edited by: Barry Malkin; Lisa Fruchtman; Walter Murch
- Music by: Carmine Coppola
- Production companies: Paramount Pictures; Zoetrope Studios
- Distributed by: Paramount Pictures
- Release dates: December 20, 1990 (Beverly Hills); December 25, 1990 (United States)
- Running time: 162 minutes (Theatrical Cut); 170 minutes (Director's Cut); 158 minutes (Coda recut)
- Country: United States
- Language: English
- Budget: $54 million
- Box office: $136.9 million

The Godfather Part III is a 1990 American epic gangster film produced and directed by Francis Ford Coppola from the screenplay co-written with Mario Puzo. The film stars Al Pacino, Diane Keaton, Talia Shire, Andy Garcia, Eli Wallach, Joe Mantegna, Bridget Fonda, George Hamilton and Sofia Coppola. It is the sequel to The Godfather Part II (1974) and the final installment of The Godfather trilogy. The film concludes the fictional story of Michael Corleone, the patriarch of the Corleone family, who attempts to legitimize his criminal empire. It also includes fictionalized accounts of two real-life events: the 1978 death of Pope John Paul I and the Papal banking scandal of 1981–1982, both linked to Michael Corleone's business affairs.

Although Coppola initially refused to return for a third film, he eventually signed to direct and write Part III. In his audio commentary for Part II, Coppola stated that only a dire financial situation, caused by the failure of his 1982 musical fantasy One from the Heart, compelled him to take up Paramount's long-standing offer to make a third installment. Coppola and Puzo wanted the title to be The Death of Michael Corleone, for they felt that the first two films had told the complete Corleone saga, so Part III would serve as the epilogue, but Paramount Pictures thought that that title was unacceptable.

Winona Ryder was initially cast in the role of Michael Corleone's daughter Mary, but eventually left production due to other commitments and nervous exhaustion. The role was ultimately given to Coppola's daughter Sofia, a decision that garnered much criticism and accusations of nepotism. Principal photography took place from late 1989 to early 1990, with filming locations in both Italy and the United States.

The Godfather Part III premiered in Beverly Hills on December 20, 1990, and was widely released in the United States on December 25. The film received mostly positive reviews, although it was considered inferior to the previous films and a disappointing conclusion to the trilogy. Critics praised Pacino's and Garcia's performances, as well as Coppola's direction, cinematography, editing, and production design, but criticized the plot and Sofia Coppola's performance. It grossed $136.8 million worldwide, and garnered seven nominations at the 63rd Academy Awards, including Best Picture, Best Director and Best Supporting Actor (Garcia). It also received seven nominations at the 48th Golden Globe Awards, including Best Motion Picture – Drama and Best Actor – Motion Picture Drama (Pacino).

In December 2020, a recut version of the film, titled The Godfather Coda: The Death of Michael Corleone, was released to coincide with the 30th anniversary of the original version. Coppola called this version closer to his original vision for the film, and it received warmer reviews from critics.

== Plot ==
In 1979, Michael Corleone is approaching 60 years of age. Plagued with guilt over his ruthless rise to power, especially for having ordered his brother Fredo Corleone's murder, (Note: As depicted in The Godfather Part II (1974)) he donates millions to charitable causes.

Michael and Kay Adams are divorced; their children Anthony and Mary live with Kay. At a reception in Michael's honor at St. Patrick's Old Cathedral that follows a papal order induction ceremony, Anthony tells his father that he is leaving law school to become an opera singer. Kay supports Anthony's decision, while Michael eventually agrees to let him go his own way. Kay reveals to Michael that she and Anthony know the truth about Fredo's death.

Vincent Mancini, the illegitimate son of Michael's long-dead older brother Sonny by his mistress Lucy Mancini, (Note: As depicted in The Godfather (1972)) arrives at the reception. Michael's sister Connie arranges for Vincent to settle a dispute with his rival Joey Zasa, but Zasa calls Vincent a bastard, and Vincent bites Zasa's ear. Michael, troubled by Vincent's temper yet impressed by his loyalty, agrees to include Vincent in the family business.

The head of the Vatican Bank, Archbishop Gilday, has accumulated a massive deficit of $769 million. Michael offers $600 million in exchange for the Vatican's shares in an international real estate company, Internazionale Immobiliare, (Note: A fictional company, but possibly a reference to the real-world Società Generale Immobiliare) which would give him a controlling interest. Immobiliare's board approves the offer, pending ratification by Pope Paul VI.

Don Altobello, a New York Mafia boss and Connie's godfather, tells Michael that his partners on The Commission want to be involved with the Immobiliare deal. However, wanting finally to become legitimate, Michael pays them his sold Las Vegas holdings instead. Zasa receives nothing and, declaring Michael to be his enemy, storms out. Don Altobello, assuring Michael that he can diplomatically resolve the matter, leaves to speak to Zasa.

Moments later, a helicopter hovers outside the conference room and opens fire. Most of the mafia's bosses are killed, but Michael, Vincent, and Michael's bodyguard Al Neri escape. Michael realizes that Altobello is the traitor, but suffers a diabetic stroke before he can act. As Michael recuperates, Vincent and Mary begin a romance, while Neri and Connie permit Vincent to retaliate against Zasa. During a street festival, Vincent kills Zasa. Michael berates Vincent for his actions and insists that Vincent end his relationship with Mary because it is dangerous and they are first cousins.

The family goes to Sicily for Anthony's operatic debut in Palermo at the Teatro Massimo. While Michael and Kay tour Sicily, Michael asks for Kay's forgiveness, and they admit that they still love each other. Michael visits Cardinal Lamberto, anticipated to become the next pope, to discuss the deal. Lamberto persuades Michael to make his first confession in 30 years, during which Michael tearfully confesses that he ordered Fredo's murder. Lamberto says that Michael deserves to suffer for his sins, but can be redeemed. He gives him sacramental absolution.

Michael tells Vincent to pretend to defect from the Corleone family to spy on Altobello. Altobello introduces Vincent to Licio Lucchesi, Immobiliare’s chairman. As a result, Michael learns from Vincent that the Immobiliare deal is an elaborate swindle, arranged by Lucchesi, Gilday and the Vatican City's accountant Frederick Keinszig, and that Altobello has hired someone in Sicily to assassinate Michael. Mosca, the veteran hitman who was hired, kills the Corleone family's friend Don Tommasino after the latter recognizes Mosca in his priest disguise. At Tommasino's funeral, Michael vows to sin no more. Following the pope's death, Cardinal Lamberto is elected to succeed him, choosing as his name Pope John Paul I. Subsequently, the Immobiliare deal is ratified.

Gilday kills the new pope with poisoned tea. Michael names Vincent the new Don of the Corleone family in return for ending his romance with Mary. The family sees Anthony's performance in Cavalleria rusticana in Palermo while Vincent exacts his revenge. Keinszig is killed, and his murder is staged as a suicide; Connie poisons Altobello via a birthday cannoli and watches him die from the opera box; Calò, Tommasino's former bodyguard, kills Lucchesi; and Neri travels to the Vatican, where he shoots and kills Gilday.

At the opera house during Anthony's performance, Mosca overcomes two of Vincent's men but is unable to get an opportunity to kill Michael. As they leave after the show at the opera house, Mosca shoots at Michael, wounding him; a second bullet hits Mary, killing her. Vincent shoots and kills Mosca. Michael cradles Mary's body and screams in agony and horror.

Seventeen years later, a depressed and elderly Michael, sitting alone in the courtyard of Don Tommasino's villa, suffers a stroke. He slumps over and falls to the ground, dead.

== Cast ==
- Al Pacino as Michael Corleone
- Diane Keaton as Kay Adams
- Talia Shire as Connie Corleone
- Andy Garcia as Vincent Corleone
- Eli Wallach as Don Altobello
- Joe Mantegna as Joey Zasa
- George Hamilton as B.J. Harrison
- Bridget Fonda as Grace Hamilton
- Sofia Coppola as Mary Corleone
- Raf Vallone as Cardinal Lamberto
- Franc D'Ambrosio as Anthony Corleone
- Donal Donnelly as Archbishop Gilday
- Richard Bright as Al Neri
- Al Martino as Johnny Fontane
- Helmut Berger as Frederick Keinszig
- Don Novello as Dominic Abbandando
- John Savage as Father Andrew Hagen
- Franco Citti as Calò
- Mario Donatone as Mosca
- Vittorio Duse as Don Tommasino
- Enzo Robutti as Don Licio Lucchesi
- Michele Russo as Spara
- Robert Cicchini as Lou Pennino
- Rogerio Miranda as Armand
- Carlos Miranda as Francesco
- Vito Antuofermo as Anthony Squigliaro
- Mickey Knox as Marty Parisi
- Brett Halsey as David Michelson
- Jeannie Linero as Lucy Mancini
- Carmine Caridi as Albert Volpe
- Don Costello as Frank Romano
- Al Ruscio as Leo Cuneo
- Rick Aviles as Mask #1
- Michael Bowen as Mask #2
- John Abineri as Hamilton Banker
- Marino Masé as Lupo
- Dado Ruspoli as Vanni
- Valeria Sabel as Sister Vincenza
- Remo Remotti as Cardinal Sistine
- Anthony Guidera as Anthony
- Tere Livrano as Theresa Hagen
- Jessica DiCicco as Child
- Catherine Scorsese as Woman in Café
- Willie Brown as Party Politician
- David Hume Kennerly as Party Photographer
- Frank Albanese as Grand Marshal (uncredited)
- Sal Borgese as Lucchesi's Door Guard (uncredited)
- Anton Coppola as Conductor (uncredited)
- Carmine Coppola as Bandleader (uncredited)
- Gia Coppola as Connie's Granddaughter (uncredited)
- Ron Jeremy as Man Chewing Toothpick (uncredited)

== Production ==
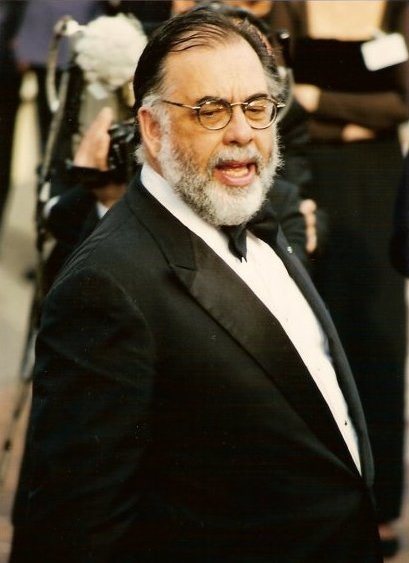
Francis Ford Coppola (pictured in 1996), director of the film

=== Writing ===
Francis Ford Coppola felt that The Godfather (1972) and The Godfather Part II (1974) had told the complete Michael Corleone saga, and did not want to make another installment in The Godfather film series. Paramount Pictures nevertheless spent years trying to make another sequel set in the 1970s with another director. Studio chiefs attempted to write a story with one by Gulf + Western founder and ultimate owner of Paramount, Charles Bludhorn, and studio president Michael Eisner also writing a treatment in which the Central Intelligence Agency would team up with the Mafia to assassinate a Costa Rican dictator, while Alexander Jacobs wrote a screenplay in which Michael Corleone's son Anthony would inherit his father's crime family.

In 1978, the studio hired Mario Puzo to write a story treatment for $250,000. This was expanded into a 1979 screenplay by Dean Riesner, which would have combined the two concepts by having Anthony Corleone as a CIA agent responsible for assassinating the dictator and then taking over the Corleone crime family. Bluhdorn offered Richard Brooks the chance to direct the film, but he declined.

John Travolta and Eric Roberts were hired as Anthony Corleone. Production on this story did not move forward, and in 1982, Vincent Patrick wrote a new screenplay in which Michael Corleone and Tom Hagen would have been killed in the opening scene, and would have focused on the first film's protagonists' child. It was not produced after director Dan Curtis quit.

In 1985, Nick Marino and Thomas Lee Wright submitted a screenplay called The Godfather: The Family Continues featuring a gang war between the Corleones and the Irish Mafia in Atlantic City, but it was rejected by the studio's new president Frank Mancuso Sr. because he believed that it did not portray the Corleones sympathetically enough. Marino and Wright later sought Writers Guild of America arbitration to receive a story credit on the final film, but were denied.

In 1985, development of The Godfather Part III stalled because the cast of the first two films demanded more money to reprise their roles and because Paramount Pictures decided that a third film could not be made without Coppola's involvement. The studio had previously considered Michael Mann, Martin Scorsese, Warren Beatty, Michael Cimino, and Sylvester Stallone (who was also attached to star). Motion picture head Ned Tanen favored Andrei Konchalovsky. That year, Coppola began considering returning to the franchise because of a dire financial situation, initially caused by the failures of One from the Heart (1982) and The Cotton Club (1984).

The Cotton Club's producer Robert Evans, who also collaborated with Coppola on the first film, tried unsuccessfully to produce another Godfather film without Coppola's involvement. In 1988, after Puzo and Nicholas Gage wrote another draft, Paramount president Frank Mancuso convinced Coppola to sign a deal to direct and write The Godfather Part III for $6 million and a share of the film's profits.

In May 1989, Coppola and Puzo completed their final draft of the screenplay. It included almost none of the elements in the scripts proposed over the previous 12 years, except for a home-invasion scene from the original Reisner script that survived in almost its original form. Coppola intended Part III to be an epilogue to the first two films, and was also inspired by William Shakespeare's King Lear. Coppola and Puzo preferred the title The Death of Michael Corleone, but Paramount Pictures found it to be unacceptable. By the time of filming, the script had been redrafted 12 times.

=== Casting ===
Al Pacino, Diane Keaton and Talia Shire reprised their roles from the first two films. Pacino's deal was finalized in August 1989, which led to the film being given the greenlight. According to Coppola's audio commentary in the film in The Godfather DVD Collection, Robert Duvall refused to take part unless he was paid a salary comparable to the $6 million earned by Pacino in the previous film. In 2004, on the CBS program 60 Minutes, Duvall said, "If they paid Pacino twice what they paid me, that's fine, but not three or four times, which is what they did."

When Duvall dropped out, Coppola rewrote the screenplay to portray Tom Hagen as having died before the story begins, and created the character B. J. Harrison, played by George Hamilton, to replace the Hagen character and portray a role smaller than Michael Corleone's attorney in the story. Coppola stated that, to him, the movie feels incomplete "without [Robert] Duvall's participation". According to Coppola, had Duvall agreed to take part in the film, the Hagen character would have been heavily involved in running the Corleone charities. Duvall confirmed in a 2010 interview that he never regretted the decision to turn down the role.

Andy Garcia was cast as Vincent Mancini over Alec Baldwin and Robert De Niro.

Julia Roberts was originally cast as Michael Corleone's daughter, Mary, but dropped out after having already cast in Pretty Woman. Madonna tested for the role, but Coppola felt that she was too old for the part after Garcia was cast. Rebecca Schaeffer was selected to audition while scheduled on her meeting with Coppola to cast the role, but was murdered by obsessed fan Robert John Bardo earlier in the day, after having just filmed the television miniseries Voyage of Terror: The Achille Lauro Affair in Italy. Winona Ryder was cast in the role due to her success in Beetlejuice the previous year and started filming her part, but dropped out after a few weeks into production due to commitments with Mermaids (1990) and nervous exhaustion.

Coppola considered replacing Ryder with either Madonna, Annabella Sciorra or Laura San Giacomo. Ultimately, Sofia Coppola, the director's daughter, was given the role of Michael Corleone's daughter. Her much-criticized performance resulted in her father being accused of nepotism, a charge that Coppola denies in the commentary track, asserting that, in his opinion, critics, "beginning with an article in Vanity Fair," were "using [my] daughter to attack me," something that he finds ironic in light of the film's denouement, in which Mary pays the ultimate price for her father's sins.

Frank Sinatra, who had not been happy with Puzo's depiction of Johnny Fontane in the original novel, agreed to play Don Altobello but the shooting schedule was too long for him to commit and the character was eventually played by Eli Wallach.

As an infant, Sofia Coppola had played Michael Corleone's infant nephew Michael Rizzi in The Godfather, during the climactic baptism/murder montage at the end of the film. Sofia Coppola also appears in The Godfather Part II as a small immigrant child, appearing alongside the nine-year-old Vito Corleone (Oreste Baldini) when he arrives by steamer at Ellis Island. The character of Michael's sister Connie is played by Francis Ford Coppola's sister, Talia Shire. Other Coppola relatives with cameos in the film include Coppola's mother Italia, father Carmine, uncle Anton and granddaughter Gia.

=== Filming ===
As well as returning cast members, Coppola also signed many members of the original crew, including cinematographer Gordon Willis and production designer Dean Tavoularis. Coppola's father Carmine wrote and conducted much of the music in the film, as he had for The Godfather Part II.

Principal photography was set to begin on November 15, 1989, with six weeks of filming at Cinecittà Studios in Italy, but the start date was pushed back to November 27. The budget was initially reported at $44 million. This period also included location shoots throughout Rome and Caprarola at landmarks such as the Palace of Justice, the Vatican Bank, Castello di Lunghezza and Santa Maria della Quercia.

However, production was delayed for three weeks due to the physical collapse of Ryder until a replacement could be found, which was complicated after Coppola was forced to declare Chapter 11 bankruptcy due to his debts. Filming resumed in the early spring of 1990 in Sicily, with scenes shot in Palermo, Taormina and Forza d'Agrò. Additionally, filming took place in the United States in New York City and Atlantic City at locations such as the Waldorf Astoria Hotel, Little Italy, St. Patrick's Cathedral and Trump Castle. Coppola delayed the production in Italy even further by constantly rewriting and "tinkering" with the film, and reportedly did not come up with an ending for the film until two months before it was due to be released.

== Music ==
The film's soundtrack received a nomination for the Golden Globe Award for Best Original Score. The film's love theme, "Promise Me You'll Remember (Love Theme from The Godfather Part III)", sung by Harry Connick, Jr., received Academy Award and Golden Globe Award nominations for Best Song. Al Martino, who portrayed Johnny Fontane in The Godfather and The Godfather Part III, sings "To Each His Own".

== Release ==
The film, distributed by Paramount Pictures, premiered in Beverly Hills on December 20, 1990, 16 years after the release of Part II, and was widely released in the United States on December 25.

== Alternate versions ==
=== The Godfather Part III: Final Director's Cut (1991) ===
For the film's 1991 home-video release, Coppola edited it and added nine minutes of deleted footage, for a running time of 170 minutes. This cut was initially released on VHS and LaserDisc, and was advertised as the "Final Director's Cut". It was the only version of the film available on home video until 2020. The original theatrical cut was released in 2022, exclusively as a part of The Godfather Trilogy 4K UHD Boxset.

=== The Godfather Coda: The Death of Michael Corleone (2020) ===
For the film's 30th anniversary, a recut titled The Godfather Coda: The Death of Michael Corleone received a limited theatrical release on December 4, 2020, followed by digital and home releases on December 8. This version includes changes to the beginning and the ending, and some edited scenes and musical cues. It has a runtime of 158 minutes.

Coppola has said that the 2020 recut is the one that he and Puzo originally envisioned, and that it "vindicates" its status in The Godfather trilogy, as well as his daughter Sofia's performance. Both Pacino and Keaton gave their approval to the new cut, noting that it is an improvement over the original theatrical release.

One of the changes described as pivotal was moving Michael's Vatican meeting, originally occurring forty minutes into the film, to the opening, which Pacino said improved the film's flow. Additionally, the re-edited cut omits Michael's death, instead showing him slowly putting on his sunglasses before fading to black and ending with the quote "When the Sicilians wish you 'Cent'anni'...it means 'for long life'...and a Sicilian never forgets."

== Reception and legacy ==
=== Box office ===
The Godfather Part III grossed $66.7 million in the United States and Canada, and $70.1 million in other territories, for a worldwide total of $136.8 million, against a production budget of $54 million.

The film opened in 1,901 theaters, and grossed $19.6 million in its opening weekend, finishing second behind Home Alone. It went on to generate a total of $6 million on Christmas Day, which was the highest at the time. For seven years, the film held that record until 1997, when it was surpassed by Titanic. In its second weekend, it made $8.3 million, finishing third.

On the release of the recut version, The Godfather Coda: The Death of Michael Corleone, in December 2020, it made $52,000 from 179 theaters. In total, the film made $95,000 domestically, and $71,000 in four international markets.

=== Critical response ===
==== Original film (1990) ====
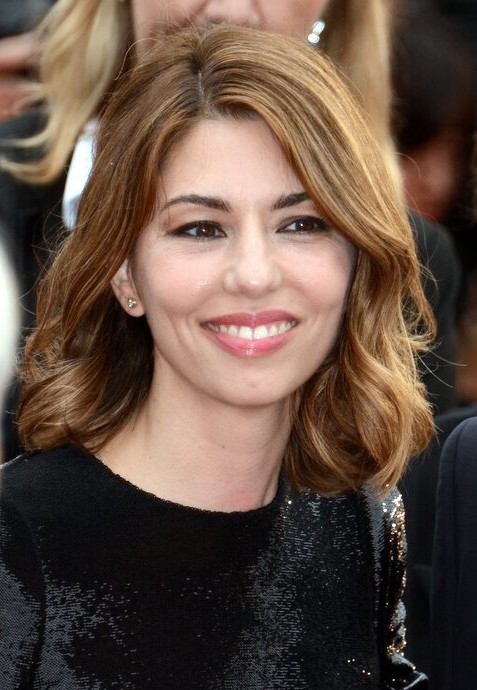
Sofia Coppola's performance in the film was panned by some critics.

Common criticisms of The Godfather Part III focused on Sofia Coppola's acting, the convoluted plot, and the film's inadequacy as a "stand-alone" story. On Rotten Tomatoes, the film holds an approval rating of 67% based on 69 reviews, with an average rating of 6.4/10. The site's critical consensus reads: "The final installment of The Godfather saga recalls its predecessors' power when it's strictly business, but underwhelming performances and confused tonality bring less closure to the Corleone story." Metacritic assigned the film a weighted average score of 60 out of 100, based on 19 critics, which indicates "mixed or average reviews". Opening day audiences polled by CinemaScore gave the film an average grade of "B+" on a scale of A+ to F.

In his review, Roger Ebert of the Chicago Sun-Times stated that it is "not even possible to understand this film without knowing the first two". Nonetheless, Ebert wrote an enthusiastic review, awarding the film three-and-a-half stars out of four. He also defended the casting of Sofia Coppola, who he felt was not miscast, stating, "There is no way to predict what kind of performance Francis Ford Coppola might have obtained from Winona Ryder, the experienced and talented young actress, who was originally set to play this role. But I think Sofia Coppola brings a quality of her own to Mary Corleone. A certain up-front vulnerability and simplicity that I think are appropriate and right for the role."

Ebert's colleague, Gene Siskel of the Chicago Tribune also gave the film high praise and placed it tenth in his list of the ten best films of 1990. Siskel admitted that the ending was the film's weakest part, citing Al Pacino's makeup as very poor. He also said, "[Another] problem is the casting of Sofia Coppola, who is out of her acting league here. She's supposed to be Andy Garcia's love interest, but no sparks fly. He's more like her babysitter." In response to Ebert's defense of Coppola, Siskel said, "I know what you're saying about her being sort of natural and not the polished bombshell, and that would've been wrong. There is one, a photographer in the picture, who takes care of that role, but at the same time, I don't think it's explained why [Vincent] really comes onto her, unless this guy is the most venal, craven guy, but look who he's playing around with. He's playing around with the Godfather's daughter."

Leonard Maltin, giving the film three out of four, stated that it is "masterfully told", but that casting Sofia Coppola was an "almost-fatal flaw". James Berardinelli gave the film a positive review, awarding it three-and-a-half stars out of four. John Simon of the National Review described the film as "a tedious effort to flog an old hippopotamus into action". Q Magazine, in a 100th edition feature on "The 100 Worst Films Since Q Began" in January 1995, called the film a "worthless piece of junk", "the cinematic equivalent of Michelangelo slapping a coat of Artex on the ceiling of the Sistine chapel" (by comparison with the first two films) and Sofia Coppola a "vapid presence".

==== Recut version (2020) ====
On Rotten Tomatoes, the recut version, The Godfather Coda: The Death of Michael Corleone, holds an approval rating of 86% based on 59 reviews. The website's critics consensus reads: "The Godfather, Coda: The Death of Michael Corleone pulls the audience back into Francis Ford Coppola's epic gangster saga with a freshly — albeit slightly — edited version of its final installment." On Metacritic, the film was assigned a weighted average score of 76 out of 100, based on 14 reviews, indicating "generally favorable reviews".

Writing for The Guardian, Peter Bradshaw gave the film three out of five stars and stated, "I'm not sure how much, if anything, Coppola's re-edit does for the film, but it's worth a watch."

Owen Gleiberman of Variety stated, "Here's the news and the ever-so-slight scandal: It's the same damn movie. [...] The one impactful change is the new opening scene," and that the film "gathers force as it goes along. It's a movie that can sweep you up if you let it [...] I salute Coppola's decision to put the movie back out there. I hope that a lot of people revisit it (or discover it for the first time), using that word 'coda' as a key — for, of course, The Godfather Part III always was an extended coda to what is arguably the greatest epic saga in the history of American cinema."

Writing for IndieWire, David Ehrlich said, "But when it was announced that [Coppola] had inevitably assembled a new cut of his most famous cause célèbre and re-christened it with the title he'd always wanted for the film... he wasn't trying to make it 'better' so much as he was trying to shift its place in history and reframe the picture as less the third part of a flawed trilogy than the postscript of a legendary dyad."

== Accolades ==
Although the film was not nearly as acclaimed as the previous two installments, the film was nominated for seven Academy Awards including Best Picture, Best Director, Best Supporting Actor (Andy Garcia), Best Cinematography, Best Film Editing, Best Production Design (Dean Tavoularis and Gary Fettis), and Best Original Song (Carmine Coppola and John Bettis for "Promise Me You'll Remember"). It is the only film in the series not to have Al Pacino nominated for an Academy Award (he was nominated for Best Supporting Actor for The Godfather and for Best Actor for The Godfather Part II). It is the only film in the trilogy not to win for Best Picture, or any other Academy Award for that matter, as well as the only film in the trilogy not selected for preservation by the U.S. National Film Registry as of 2026. Along with The Lord of the Rings, The Godfather Trilogy shares the distinction that all of its installments were nominated for Best Picture.

The film was also nominated for seven Golden Globe Awards, but did not win. Sofia Coppola won two Golden Raspberry Awards for both Worst Supporting Actress and Worst New Star.

Award	Category	Nominee	Result
63rd Academy Awards	Best Picture	Francis Ford Coppola	Nominated
63rd Academy Awards	Best Director	Francis Ford Coppola	Nominated
63rd Academy Awards	Best Actor in a Supporting Role	Andy Garcia	Nominated
63rd Academy Awards	Best Art Direction	Dean Tavoularis and Gary Fettis	Nominated
63rd Academy Awards	Best Cinematography	Gordon Willis	Nominated
63rd Academy Awards	Best Film Editing	Barry Malkin, Lisa Fruchtman and Walter Murch	Nominated
63rd Academy Awards	Best Original Song	"Promise Me You'll Remember" (music by Carmine Coppola; lyrics by John Bettis)	Nominated
43rd Directors Guild of America Awards	Outstanding Directorial Achievement in Motion Pictures	Francis Ford Coppola	Nominated
48th Golden Globe Awards	Best Motion Picture – Drama		Nominated
48th Golden Globe Awards	Best Director – Motion Picture	Francis Ford Coppola	Nominated
48th Golden Globe Awards	Best Actor in a Motion Picture – Drama	Al Pacino	Nominated
48th Golden Globe Awards	Best Supporting Actor – Motion Picture	Andy Garcia	Nominated
48th Golden Globe Awards	Best Screenplay – Motion Picture	Francis Ford Coppola and Mario Puzo	Nominated
48th Golden Globe Awards	Best Original Score	Carmine Coppola	Nominated
48th Golden Globe Awards	Best Original Song	"Promise Me You'll Remember" (music by Carmine Coppola; lyrics by John Bettis)	Nominated
11th Golden Raspberry Awards	Worst Supporting Actress	Sofia Coppola	Won
11th Golden Raspberry Awards	Worst New Star	Sofia Coppola	Won

The film is recognized by American Film Institute in these lists:

- 2005: AFI's 100 Years...100 Movie Quotes:
  - Michael Corleone: "Just when I thought I was out, they pull me back in." – Nominated

== Historical background ==
Parts of the film are very loosely based on real historical events concerning the ending of the papacy of Pope Paul VI, the very short tenure of Pope John Paul I in 1978 and the collapse of the Banco Ambrosiano in 1982. Like the character Cardinal Lamberto (Raf Vallone), who becomes John Paul I, the historical John Paul I, Albino Luciani, reigned for only a very short time before being found dead in his bed.

Journalist David Yallop argues that Luciani was planning a reform of Vatican finances and that he died by poisoning; these claims are reflected in the film. Yallop also names as a suspect Archbishop Paul Marcinkus, who was the head of the Vatican Bank, like the character Archbishop Gilday (Donal Donnelly) in the film. However, while Marcinkus was noted for his muscular physique and Chicago origins, Gilday is a mild Irishman. The character has also drawn comparisons to Cardinal Giuseppe Caprio, as he was in charge of the Vatican finances during the approximate period in which the movie was based.

The character of Frederick Keinszig (Helmut Berger), the Swiss banker who is murdered and left hanging under a bridge, mirrors the fate and physical appearance of Roberto Calvi, the Italian head of the Banco Ambrosiano who was found hanging under Blackfriars Bridge in London in 1982 (though it was initially unclear whether it was suicide or murder, in 2002 courts in London ruled the latter). The name "Keinszig" is taken from Manuela Kleinszig, the girlfriend of Flavio Carboni, who was indicted as one of Calvi's murderers in 2005.

Don Licio Lucchesi (Enzo Robutti) is widely seen as partly inspired by seven-time Italian prime minister Giulio Andreotti, who wore similar thick-rimmed glasses. The line spoken to Lucchesi by Calò (Franco Citti) immediately before stabbing him, "Il potere logora chi non ce l'ha" ("Power wears out those who don't have it"), is a quote attributed to Andreotti in response to the claim that he and his party had become worn out from years of being in power.

== Cancelled sequel ==
Following the reaction to the third installment, Coppola stated that the idea of a fourth film was discussed, but Mario Puzo died before he was able to write it. A potential script, told in a similar narrative to Part II, would have included Robert De Niro reprising his role as a younger Vito Corleone in the 1930s; Leonardo DiCaprio was slated to portray a young Sonny Corleone gaining the Corleone family's political power with Garcia as Vincent Corleone during the 1980s running the family business through ten years of destructive war, haunted by the death of his cousin Mary and eventually losing the family's respect and power. Garcia has since claimed the film's script was nearly produced.

Puzo's portion of the potential sequel, dealing with the Corleone family in the early 1930s, was eventually expanded into a novel by Edward Falco and published in 2012 as The Family Corleone. Paramount sued the Puzo estate to prevent the publication of the novel, prompting a counter-suit on the part of the estate, claiming a breach of contract. The studio and the estate subsequently settled the suits, allowing the publication of the book, but with the studio retaining the rights to possible future films.

== Bibliography ==
- Coppola, Francis Ford. "Director's Commentary track". The Godfather Part III DVD. Included in The Godfather DVD Collection.
- Cornwell, Rupert (1984). God's Banker: The Life and Death of Roberto Calvi. Victor Gollancz Ltd.
- Yallop, David (1987). In God's Name: An Investigation into the Murder of Pope John Paul I. Corgi.
