= Eli Wallach =

American actor (1915–2014)

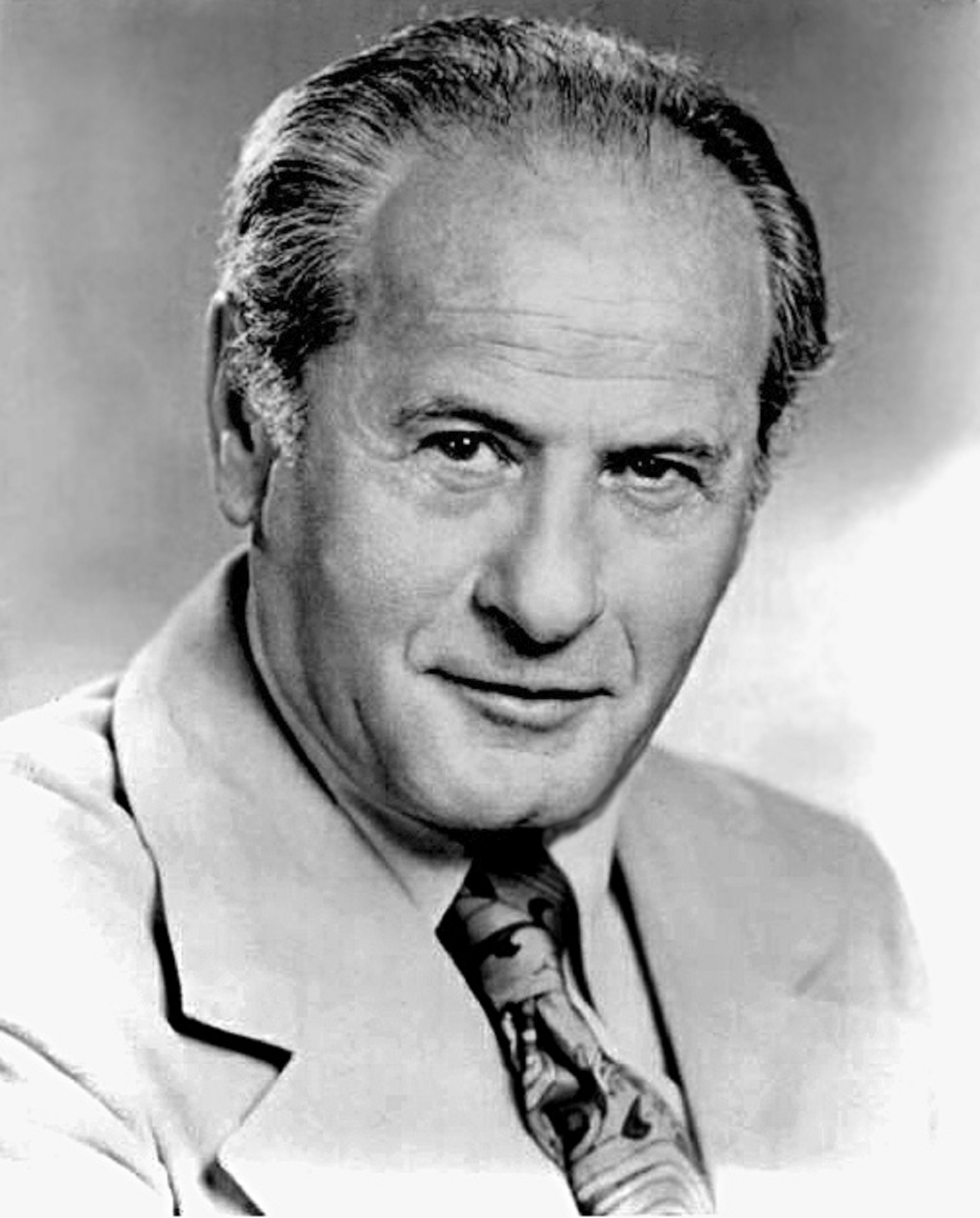
- Wallach in 1966
- Born: Eli Herschel Wallach; December 7, 1915; New York City, U.S.
- Died: June 24, 2014 (aged 98); New York City, U.S.
- Education: University of Texas (BA); City College of New York (MEd); Neighborhood Playhouse School of the Theatre
- Occupation: Actor
- Years active: 1945–2014
- Spouse: Anne Jackson (m. 1948)
- Children: 3
- Relatives: Joan Wallach Scott (niece); A. O. Scott (grandnephew)
- Awards: BAFTA Award; Tony Award; Emmy Award; Honorary Academy Award

Signature
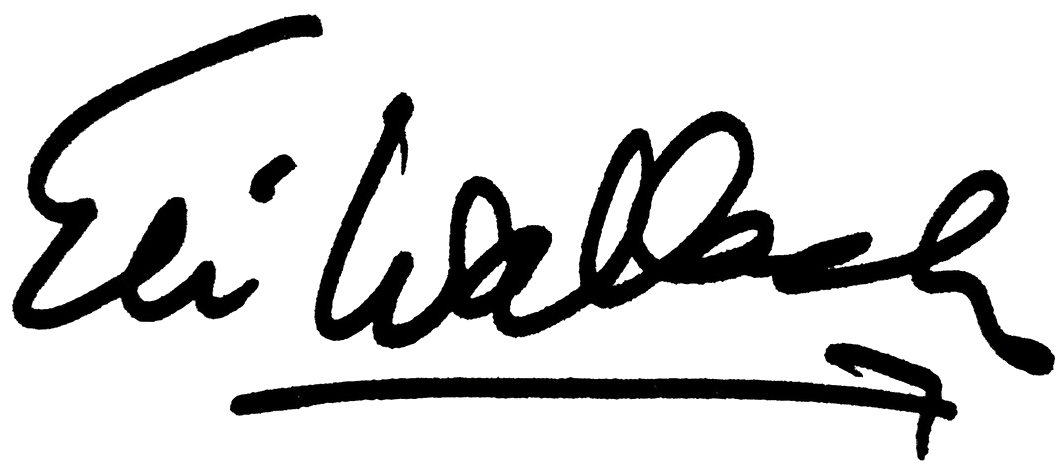

Eli Herschel Wallach (/ˈiːlaɪ ˈwɒlək/ EE-ly WOL-ək; December 7, 1915 – June 24, 2014) was an American film, television, and stage actor from New York City. Known for his character actor roles, his entertainment career spanned over six decades. He received a BAFTA Award, a Tony Award, and a Primetime Emmy Award. He was also inducted into the American Theater Hall of Fame in 1988 and received the Academy Honorary Award in 2010.

Originally trained in stage acting, he garnered over 90 film credits. He and his wife Anne Jackson often appeared together on stage, eventually becoming a notable acting couple in American theater. Wallach initially studied method acting under Sanford Meisner and later became a founding member of the Actors Studio, where he studied under Lee Strasberg. He played a wide variety of roles throughout his career, primarily as a supporting actor. He won the Tony Award for Best Supporting or Featured Actor in a Play for The Rose Tattoo (1951).

For his debut screen performance in Baby Doll (1956), he won a BAFTA Award for Best Newcomer and a Golden Globe Award nomination. Among his other most famous roles are Calvera in The Magnificent Seven (1960), Guido in The Misfits (1961), Tuco ("The Ugly") in The Good, the Bad and the Ugly (1966) and Don Altobello in The Godfather Part III (1990). Other notable films include How the West Was Won (1962), Tough Guys (1986), The Two Jakes (1990), The Associate (1996), The Holiday (2006), Wall Street: Money Never Sleeps, and The Ghost Writer (both 2010). He received Primetime Emmy Award nominations for Studio 60 on the Sunset Strip (2007) and Nurse Jackie (2011).

== Early life and education ==
Eli Herschel Wallach was born on December 7, 1915, at 156 Union Street in Red Hook, Brooklyn, a son of Polish Jewish immigrants Abraham and Bertha Wallach (née Schorr) from Przemyśl. He had a brother and two sisters. He and his family were among only a few Jews in an otherwise Italian-American neighborhood. His parents owned Bertha's Candy Store. Wallach graduated in 1936 from the University of Texas with a degree in history. In a later interview, Wallach said that he learned to ride horses while in Texas, explaining that he liked Texas because "It opened my eyes to the word friendship... You could rely on people. If they gave you their word, that was it... It was an education."

Two years later he earned a master of arts degree in education from the City College of New York. He gained his first method acting experience at the Neighborhood Playhouse School of the Theatre in New York City, where he studied under Sanford Meisner. There, according to Wallach, actors were forced to "unlearn" all their physical and vocal mannerisms, while traditional stage etiquette and "singsong" deliveries were "utterly excised" from his classroom.

== Military service ==
Wallach's education was cut short when he was drafted into the United States Army in 1940. He served as a staff sergeant and medic in a military hospital in Hawaii and later was sent to Officer Candidate School (OCS) in Abilene, Texas, to train as a medical administrative officer. Commissioned as a second lieutenant, he was ordered to Casablanca. Later, when he was serving in France, a senior officer noticed his acting career and asked him to create a show for the patients. He and his unit wrote a play called Is This the Army?, which was inspired by Irving Berlin's This Is the Army. In the comedy, Wallach and the other actors mocked Axis dictators, with Wallach portraying Adolf Hitler. Wallach was discharged as a captain following the war's end in 1945. He was awarded the Army Good Conduct Medal, the American Defense Service Medal, the American Campaign Medal, the Asiatic–Pacific Campaign Medal, the European–African–Middle Eastern Campaign Medal and the World War II Victory Medal.

== Career ==
=== Stage actor ===
Wallach took classes in acting at the Dramatic Workshop of the New School in New York City with the influential German director Erwin Piscator. He later became a founding member of the Actors Studio, taught by Lee Strasberg. There, he studied more method acting technique with founding member Robert Lewis, and with other students including Marlon Brando, Montgomery Clift, Herbert Berghof, Sidney Lumet, and his soon-to-be wife, Anne Jackson. Wallach became Marilyn Monroe's first new friend when she became a student at the Actors Studio, once insisting on watching him perform in The Teahouse of the August Moon from the backstage wings, simply to see up close how experienced actors perform a two-hour play. She also became friends with his wife, Anne Jackson, also studying at the Studio, and would visit the couple at their home and sometimes babysit their new child.

In 1945 Wallach made his Broadway debut and he won a Tony Award in 1951 for his performance alongside Maureen Stapleton in the Tennessee Williams play The Rose Tattoo. His other theater credits include Mister Roberts, The Teahouse of the August Moon, Camino Real, Major Barbara (in which director Charles Laughton discouraged Wallach's established method acting style), Luv, and Staircase, co-starring Milo O'Shea, which was a serious depiction of an aging homosexual couple. He also played a role in a tour of Antony and Cleopatra, produced by the actress Katharine Cornell in 1946. He exposed Americans to the work of playwright Eugène Ionesco in plays including The Chairs and The Lesson in 1958, and in 1961 Rhinoceros opposite Zero Mostel. He last starred on stage as the title character in Visiting Mr. Green.

With Maureen Stapleton in The Rose Tattoo (1951)

The stage was where Wallach focused his early career. From 1945 to 1950 he and his wife, Anne Jackson, worked together acting in various plays by Tennessee Williams. The five years following, he continued only working on stage, not becoming involved in film work until 1956. During those years, however, they were generally having a hard time making ends meet. He recalls they were getting along on unemployment insurance and living in a one-room, $35 a month apartment on lower Fifth Avenue in the Village. When he did get offered early movie parts, he turned them down with no regrets, and very early in his career he explained his reasoning:

What do I need a movie for? The stage is on a higher level in every way, and a more satisfying medium. Movies, by comparison, are like calendar art next to great paintings. You can't really do very much in movies or in television, but the stage is such an anarchistic medium.

He said that the stage was what attracted him most and what he "needed" to do. "Acting is the most alive thing I can do, and the most joyous", he stated.

Wallach and Jackson became one of the best-known acting couples in the American theater, as iconic as Alfred Lunt and Lynn Fontanne, and Jessica Tandy and Hume Cronyn, and they looked for opportunities to work together. During an interview, he said of Jackson, "I have tremendous respect and admiration for her as an actress . . . we have a terrific working compatibility when we're in the same play, especially when the play means something important to us." When he did gravitate toward accepting parts in films, he did so to "help pay the bills", he said, adding, "for actors, movies are a means to an end."

Despite the fact that he eventually acted in over 90 films and almost as many television dramas, he continued to accept stage parts throughout his career, often with Jackson. They played in comedies like The Typists and The Tiger in 1963, and acted together in Waltz of the Toreadors in 1973. In 1978 they played in a revival of The Diary of Anne Frank, along with their daughters, and in 1984 they acted in Nest of the Wood Grouse, directed by Joseph Papp. Four years later, in 1988, they acted in a revival of Cafe Crown, a portrait of the Yiddish theater scene during its prime. They continued acting together as late as 2000, while he also took on roles alone throughout all those years.

=== Film and television roles ===
Wallach and Carroll Baker in the swing scene from Baby Doll

Wallach's film debut was in Elia Kazan's controversial 1956 Baby Doll, for which he won the British Academy Film Awards (BAFTA) as "Most Promising Newcomer." Baby Doll was controversial because of its underlying sexual theme. Director Elia Kazan however, set explicit limits on Wallach's scenes, telling him not to actually seduce Carroll Baker, but instead to create an unfulfilled erotic tension. Kazan later explained his reasoning:

What is erotic about sex to me is the seduction, not the act ... The scene on the swing with Eli Wallach and Carroll Baker in Baby Doll is my exact idea of what eroticism in films should be.

Wallach went on to a prolific career as "one of the greatest 'character actors' ever to appear on stage and screen", notes Turner Classic Movies, acting in over 90 films. Having grown up on the "mean streets" of an Italian American neighborhood, and his versatility as a method actor, Wallach developed the ability to play a wide variety of different roles, although he tried not to get pinned down to any single type of character. "Right now I'm playing an old man", he said at age 84. But "I've been through all the ethnic groups, from Mexican bandits to Italian Mafia heads to Okinawans to half-breeds, and now I'm playing old Jews. Who knows?"

Noting this versatility as a character actor, the Academy of Motion Picture Arts and Sciences called him "the quintessential chameleon", with the ability to play different characters "effortlessly", and L.A. Times theater critic Charles McNulty saw Wallach's "power to illuminate" his various screen or stage personas as being "radioactive." The Guardian has written that "Wallach was made for character acting", and includes movie clips from some of his most memorable roles in a tribute to him.

In 1961, Wallach co-starred with Marilyn Monroe, Montgomery Clift and Clark Gable in The Misfits, Monroe's and Gable's last film before their deaths. Wallach never learned why he was cast in the film, although he suspected that Monroe had something to do with it. Its screenwriter, Arthur Miller, who was married to Monroe at the time, said that "Eli Wallach is the happiest good actor I've ever known. He really enjoys the work."

Some of his other films included The Lineup (1958); Lord Jim (1965) with Peter O'Toole; a comic role in How to Steal a Million (1966), again with O'Toole, and Audrey Hepburn; and as Tuco ("the Ugly") in Sergio Leone's The Good, the Bad and the Ugly (1966) with Clint Eastwood and Lee Van Cleef, followed by other Spaghetti Westerns, such as Ace High. At one point, Henry Fonda had asked Wallach whether he himself should accept a part offered to him to act in a similar Western, Once Upon a Time in the West (1968), which would also be directed by Leone. Wallach said "Yes, you'll enjoy the challenge", and Fonda later thanked Wallach for that advice.

Wallach and Eastwood became friends during the filming of The Good, the Bad and the Ugly and he recalled their off-work time together: "Clint was the tall, silent type. He's the kind where you open up and do all the talking. He smiles and nods and stores it all away in that wonderful calculator of a brain." In 2003 Wallach acted in Mystic River, produced and directed by Eastwood, who once said "working with Eli Wallach has been one of the great pleasures of my life."

A pivotal moment in Wallach's career came in 1953, when he, along with Frank Sinatra and Harvey Lembeck, tried out for the role of Maggio in the film From Here to Eternity. Sinatra biographer Kitty Kelly notes that while Sinatra's test was good, it had none of the "consummate acting ability" of Wallach. Producer Harry Cohn and director Fred Zinnemann were "dazzled" by Wallach's screen test and wanted him to play the part. However, Wallach had previously been offered an important role in another Tennessee Williams play, Camino Real, to be directed by Elia Kazan, and turned down the movie role. Wallach said that when he learned that the play had finally received financing, he "grabbed" the opportunity: "It was a remarkable piece of writing by the leading playwright in America and it was going to be directed by the country's best. There really wasn't much of a choice for me." The film, however, went on to win eight Academy Awards, including one for Sinatra, which revived his career. Wallach recalled afterwards, "Whenever Sinatra saw me, he'd say, 'Hello, you crazy actor!'" Wallach, however, said he had no regrets.

Film historian James Welsh states that during Wallach's career, he appeared in most of the "prestige" television dramas during the "Golden Age" of the 1950s, including Studio One, The Philco Television Playhouse, The Armstrong Circle Theatre, Playhouse 90, and The Hallmark Hall of Fame, among others. He won the 1966–1967 Emmy Award for his role in the telefilm The Poppy is Also a Flower. In 2006 Wallach appeared on NBC's Studio 60 on the Sunset Strip, playing a former writer who was blacklisted in the 1950s. His character was a writer on The Philco Comedy Hour, a show that aired on a fictional NBS network. This is a reference to The Philco Television Playhouse, in several episodes of which Wallach actually appeared in 1955. Wallach earned a 2007 Emmy nomination for his work on the show.

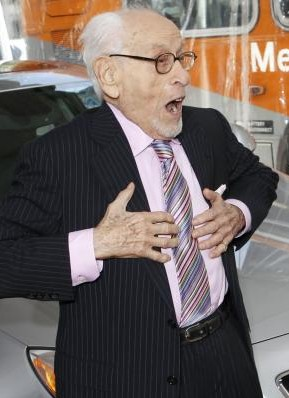
Wallach at the 2010 TCM Classic Film Festival

During the filming of The Good, the Bad and the Ugly, Wallach nearly died three times. Once, he accidentally drank a bottle of acid which was placed next to his pop bottle; another time was in a scene where he was about to be hanged, someone fired a pistol which caused the horse underneath him to bolt and run while Wallach's hands were still tied behind his back; in a different scene with him lying on a railroad track, he was close to being decapitated by steps jutting out from the train.

Wallach appeared as DC Comics' supervillain Mr. Freeze in the 1960s Batman television series. He said that he received more fan mail about his role as Mr. Freeze than for all his other roles combined. He played Gus Farber in the television miniseries Seventh Avenue in 1977, and 10 years later, at the age of 71, he starred alongside Michael Landon in Highway to Heaven episode "A Father's Faith". Three years later, he played aging mob boss Don Altobello in Francis Ford Coppola's The Godfather Part III. Eli Wallach was an actor who guest-starred on Law & Order in the episode "The Working Stiff" as Simon Vilanis in 1991.

On November 13, 2010, at the age of 94, Wallach received an Academy Honorary Award for his contribution to the film industry from the Academy of Motion Picture Arts and Sciences. A few years prior to that event, Kate Winslet told another audience that Wallach, with whom she acted in The Holiday in 2006, was one of the "most charismatic men" she'd met, and her "very own sexiest man alive."

Wallach's final performance was in the short film The Train (2015). Wallach plays a Holocaust survivor who, in a meeting, teaches a self-consumed and preoccupied young man that life can change in a moment. The short was shot in early 2014 and premiered on August 6, 2015, at the Rhode Island International Film Festival.

Between 1984 and 1997, he also performed voiceovers in a series of television commercials for the Toyota Pickup.

== Personal life ==
Wallach was married to actress Anne Jackson, with whom he frequently shared the screen, from March 5, 1948, until his death on June 24, 2014. They had three children, including Roberta.

In 2008, Wallach lost sight in his left eye due to a stroke.

His niece is historian Joan Wallach Scott (daughter of his brother Sam). A.O. Scott, a film critic for The New York Times, is his great-nephew.

== Death ==
Wallach died on June 24, 2014, of natural causes at the age of 98. His body was cremated.

== Filmography ==
Selected filmography:

- Baby Doll (1956)
- The Lineup (1958)
- Seven Thieves (1960)
- The Magnificent Seven (1960)
- The Misfits (1961)
- How the West Was Won (1962)
- The Victors (1963)
- Lord Jim (1965)
- Genghis Khan (1965)
- The Poppy Is Also a Flower (1966)
- How to Steal a Million (1966)
- The Good, the Bad and the Ugly (1966)
- The Tiger Makes Out (1967)
- How to Save a Marriage and Ruin Your Life (1968)
- A Lovely Way to Die (1968)
- Ace High (1968)
- Mackenna's Gold (1969)
- Le Cerveau (1969)
- The People Next Door (1970)
- The Angel Levine (1970)
- Cinderella Liberty (1973)
- The Domino Principle (1977)
- The Deep (1977)
- Circle of Iron (1978)
- Movie Movie (1978)
- The Hunter (1980)
- Our Family Honor (1985)
- Tough Guys (1986)
- The Two Jakes (1990)
- The Godfather Part III (1990)
- Night and the City (1992)
- The Associate (1996)
- Keeping the Faith (2000)
- Mystic River (2003)
- The Holiday (2006)
- New York, I Love You (2008)
- The Ghost Writer (2010)
- Wall Street: Money Never Sleeps (2010)

== Awards and nominations ==
Year	Award	Category	Nominated work	Result	Ref.
2010	Academy Awards	Academy Honorary Award	—N/a	Won	
1956	British Academy Film Awards	Most Promising Newcomer to Film	Baby Doll	Won	
1993	Drama Desk Awards	Outstanding Featured Actor in a Play	The Price	Nominated	
1998	Drama Desk Awards	Outstanding Actor in a Play	Visiting Mr. Green	Nominated	
1957	The Drama League	Distinguished Performance Award	Major Barbara	Won	
2001	Golden Boot Awards	—N/a	—N/a	Won	
1956	Golden Globe Awards	Best Supporting Actor – Motion Picture	Baby Doll	Nominated	
1974	Grammy Awards	Best Recording for Children	Eli Wallach Reads Isaac Bashevis Singer	Nominated	
2006	National Board of Review Awards	Career Achievement Award	—N/a	Won	
2004	Newport International Film Festival	Best Actor	King of the Corner	Won	
1967	Primetime Emmy Awards	Outstanding Performance by an Actor in a Supporting Role in a Drama	The Poppy Is Also a Flower	Won	
1968	Primetime Emmy Awards	Outstanding Single Performance by an Actor in a Leading Role in a Drama	CBS Playhouse (Episode: "Dear Friends")	Nominated	
1987	Primetime Emmy Awards	Outstanding Supporting Actor in a Miniseries or a Special	Something in Common	Nominated	
2007	Primetime Emmy Awards	Outstanding Guest Actor in a Drama Series	Studio 60 on the Sunset Strip (Episode: "The Wrap Party")	Nominated	
2011	Primetime Emmy Awards	Outstanding Guest Actor in a Comedy Series	Nurse Jackie (Episode: "Chicken Soup")	Nominated	
2002	Taormina Film Fest	Sergio Leone Award	—N/a	Won	
1951	Theatre World Awards	—N/a	The Rose Tattoo	Won	
1951	Tony Awards	Best Supporting or Featured Actor in a Play	The Rose Tattoo	Won	

Preceded by Otto Preminger	Mr. Freeze Actor; 1967	Succeeded by Arnold Schwarzenegger
