= In God's Name =

Book by David Yallop

- Author: David A. Yallop
- Language: English
- Publisher: Bantam Books
- Publication date: 1984
- Publication place: United States
- ISBN: 0-553-05073-7

In God's Name: An Investigation into the Murder of Pope John Paul I is a book by David A. Yallop about the death of Pope John Paul I. It was published in 1984 by Bantam Books. “In God’s Name” spent 15 weeks on The Times’s best-seller list and won the Crime Writers’ Association’s Gold Dagger award for nonfiction in 1984.

== Potential danger ==
Yallop proposes the theory that the pope was in "potential danger" because of corruption in the Istituto per le Opere di Religione (IOR, Institute of Religious Works, the Vatican's financial institution, commonly known as the Vatican Bank), which owned many shares in Banco Ambrosiano. The Vatican Bank lost about a quarter of a billion US dollars.

== See also ==
- Pope John Paul I conspiracy theories
- Pecorelli list — alleged Freemasons in the Vatican
