= Rye House =

Rye House may refer to:

- Rye House Cobras, a defunct speedway team
- Rye House (Litchfield, Connecticut), a Registered Historic Place in Litchfield, Connecticut
- Rye House Plot, a plot to assassinate King Charles II of England and his brother, James, Duke of York
- Rye House Rockets, a speedway team
- Rye House, Hertfordshire, a location in Hoddesdon, Hertfordshire
  - Rye House Kart Circuit
  - Rye House power station
  - Rye House railway station, the local National Rail station
  - Rye House Stadium, a greyhound racing and speedway racing stadium
- Rye Meads nature reserve, a Royal Society for the Protection of Birds (RSPB) nature reserve in the Lee Valley, Hertfordshire, England
