= Riptide (American TV series) =

American detective television series (1984–1986)

- Title card for the first season
- Genre: Detective fiction
- Created by: Frank Lupo; Stephen J. Cannell
- Starring: Perry King; Joe Penny; Thom Bray; Jack Ging; June Chadwick
- Composers: Mike Post; Pete Carpenter
- Country of origin: United States
- Original language: English
- No. of seasons: 3
- No. of episodes: 58

Production
- Executive producers: Frank Lupo; Stephen J. Cannell; Babs Greyhosky (seasons 2–3)
- Producers: Babs Greyhosky (season 1); J. Rickley Dumm; Tom Blomquist (season 3)
- Production locations: Cabrillo Beach; San Pedro, Los Angeles; Redondo Beach, California; Santa Clarita, California
- Running time: 48 minutes per episode
- Production company: Stephen J. Cannell Productions

Original release
- Network: NBC
- Release: January 3, 1984 – April 22, 1986

Riptide is an American detective television series that ran on NBC between January 3, 1984 and April 22, 1986, starring Perry King, Joe Penny, and Thom Bray. A mid-season replacement, it debuted as a two-hour TV movie in early 1984.

By September 1985, domestic distribution rights to the series were sold to Columbia Pictures Television. Its successor, Sony Pictures Television, still holds these rights to this day.

After its cancellation, reruns of the series aired on the USA Network in the late 1980s. The series later appeared on MeTV+, a sister network of MeTV.

== Premise ==
Cody Allen (Perry King) and Nick Ryder (Joe Penny) are two former Vietnam War Army buddies who decided to open the Pier 56 Detective Agency (later known as the Riptide Detective Agency) in Los Angeles, California. Realizing that computers and technology play a major role in many investigations, they recruit the help of Murray "Boz" Bozinsky (Thom Bray), a brilliant but nerdy scientist and computer hacker whom they met while serving in the Army.

The team operates out of Cody's boat, the Riptide, moored at Pier 56 at King Harbor Marina in Redondo Beach. The men have several other tools in their fight against crime and injustice, including Murray's robot, The Roboz (which, unlike most television robots, does not speak); Nick's aging Sikorsky S-58T helicopter, The Screaming Mimi, which Nick occasionally used for his sideline business, aerial harbor tours; and Cody's speedboat, the Ebb Tide. Nick also owns a classic red Chevrolet Corvette, and in early episodes, Cody drives an orange "Woodie" station wagon which is later replaced by a four-wheel drive custom GMC Jimmy.

Lt. Quinlan (Jack Ging) is a local police officer who continually harasses the trio. Lt. Parisi (June Chadwick), the agency's police contact during the final episodes, is more cooperative. During the first few episodes, Mama Jo (Anne Francis) is the crusty skipper of the Barefoot Contessa, a tourist boat with an all-female crew. Introduced later in the first season is Max, a comedian at a local club. Second-season episodes also feature Dooley (Ken Olandt), a dock boy who occasionally assists the team in their escapades.

The show's penultimate episode, "If You Can't Beat 'Em, Join 'Em", shows Cody and Nick acting as consultants to Rosalind Grant (Annette McCarthy) and Cary Russell (H. Richard Greene), the bickering stars of a television detective show pilot that closely resembles and parodies Moonlighting, Riptide's former primetime competition on Tuesday nights.

Although local mobsters were depicted in most episodes, some reflected other topics, such as corruption within the U.S. Army, high-level cover-ups, and black operations by corporate America. The third season's "Home for Christmas", with a performance by James Whitmore, has a strongly emotional tone.

== Cast ==
- Perry King as Cody Allen
- Joe Penny as Nick Ryder
- Thom Bray as Murray "Boz" Bozinsky

== Episodes ==
=== Series overview ===
Season	Episodes	Originally released	
Season	Episodes	First released	Last released
1	14	January 3, 1984	May 22, 1984
2	22	October 2, 1984	May 14, 1985
3	22	October 1, 1985	April 22, 1986

=== Season 1 (1984) ===
No. overall	No. in season	Title	Directed by	Written by	Original release date
1	1	"Riptide"	Christian I. Nyby II	Stephen J. Cannell & Frank Lupo	January 3, 1984
2	2	"Riptide"	Christian I. Nyby II	Stephen J. Cannell & Frank Lupo	January 3, 1984
Mama Jo and the crew rescue Kimba Hall, a young woman stranded when an explosion damages the boat she was on, killing everyone else aboard. While searching for the real criminals, Cody Allen, Nick Ryder, and Murray "Boz" Bozinski work to prove that Kimba Hall had nothing to do with the Trade Wind's deadly explosion, or the smuggling operation the police believe is connected. Guest starring: Karen Kopins, Robert Viharo, Patrick Dollaghan, Gianni Russo, Marla Heasley, Eugene Butler, Lee Patterson, Francis Xavier McCarthy, Ray Girardin, Robin Evans, Ingrid Anderson
3	3	"Conflict of Interest"	Ron Satlof	Stephen J. Cannell	January 10, 1984
The wife of a well-known mobster, Tina Brazil, heads to Cody and Nick for help when she gets wind that her husband, Ricky Brazil, is plotting a murder. Guest starring: Kristen Meadows, Robert Desiderio, Bill Overton, Eli Cummings, Gianni Russo, Charles H. Hyman
4	4	"Somebody's Killing the Great Geeks of America"	Bruce Kessler	Babs Greyhosky	January 17, 1984
When an attempt is made on the life of Murray's friend Natalie Kramer (Cindy Pickett) from the high IQ society, the agency investigates, uncovering a larger plot to assassinate a U.S. Senator. Guest starring: Cindy Pickett, Joe Michael Terry, Rodney Kageyama, Jeffrey Lampert, Vahan Moosekian
5	5	"Hatchet Job"	Ron Satlof	Mark Jones	January 31, 1984
Murray tries to get more involved in the physical elements of the investigations, and while employed by the Pier 56 merchant's association to locate a burglar plaguing the docks, the agency is also hired by an escaped mental patient (Maylo McCaslin) to solve her boyfriend Jack's murder. Guest starring: Maylo McCaslin, Randi Brooks, Beau Star, Deborah Shelton, Mike Genovese, Tom Pletts, Katherine Kelly Lang
6	6	"The Mean Green Love Machine"	Guy Magar	Stephen J. Cannell	February 7, 1984
The guys are hired by their old friend and dock neighbor Brandy to help her find her father Lane and his wife Dee-Dee Preston (Mary-Margaret Humes), who've gone missing in Cabo San Lucas. Guest starring: Mary-Margaret Humes, Tamara Stafford, Sam Scarber, Robert Sampson, Ismael 'East' Carlo, Bruce Tuthill Special guest star: James Luisi
7	7	"Diamonds Are for Never"	Gloryette Clark	Babs Greyhosky	February 21, 1984
After witnessing the murder of her friend Arthur Truman, Connie (Kathryn Witt), a flight attendant, encounters Murray in a movie theater and the agency helps her seek out Arthur's archaeologist brother Walter (John Anderson) in Peru, uncovering a diamond smuggling operation in the process. Guest starring: Kathryn Witt, Peter Hobbs, Pepper Martin, Robin Evans, K.C. Winkler, Maurice Sneed, Jason Edwards Special guest star: John Anderson
8	8	"The Hardcase"	Victor Hsu	Mark Jones	February 28, 1984
When the agency investigates a suspicious boat that appears in a slip at King Harbor, they find that it's connected to the murder of a doctor, which the police suspect Sherry Meyers (Kelly Preston) of committing. Guest starring: Kelly Preston, Paul Gleason, Jeffrey Josephson, Joshua Bryant, Robin Evans, K.C. Winkler, Karl Johnson, Lew Saunders, Lewis Arquette, James Edgcomb, Ken Lerner, Xander Berkeley Special guest star: William Smith Also starring: Marsha Warfield Marsha Warfield appears as a comedian working at Straightaways restaurant, and Paul Gleason as the detective.
9	9	"Four-Eyes"	Bruce Kessler	Babs Greyhosky	March 6, 1984
The crew reluctantly take a job from the shady Myron Bell (Danny Wells), a well-known local attorney, and end up mixed up first in the client's divorce from his wife Joan (Joan Freeman), and then in his murder. Guest starring: Stepfanie Kramer, D.D. Howard, Danny Wells, Michael Baseleon, Joan Freeman, Mary Beth Evans, Craig Litter
10	10	"#1 with a Bullet"	Arnold Laven	Stephen J. Cannell	March 20, 1984
Two singers of a hit music group are involved in a devastating car crash that leaves one dead and one in serious condition at the hospital. The guys are hired by the singers' fanclub to deliver flowers to his bedside, only to find that it may not have been an accident after all. Guest starring: Brant von Hoffman, Kelbe Nugent, Murphy Cross, Reid Smith, Peter Leeds, Ted Sorel, Mary Betten, Brian Libby, Jack Shea, G. Rockett Phillips, Richard Kuhlman Special guest star: Edward Winter Also starring: Marsha Warfield
11	11	"Long Distance Daddy"	Bruce Kessler	Babs Greyhosky	March 27, 1984
A member a gun smuggling racket goes to drastic measures to get rid of the head of the racket and the witnesses to his crime--Nick's sponsor child from Cambodia and his critically ill sister. Guest starring: Doug France, Frank Annese, Marshall Teague, Dean Wein, John Louie, David Graf, Julia Kono, Bobby Kelton, Tony Ciccone, James Emery Special guest star: Joseph Sirola Also starring: Marsha Warfield
12	12	"Double Your Pleasure"	Michael O'Herlihy	Tom Blomquist	April 3, 1984
Murray drags a reluctant Cody and Nick to a party where Cody meets an attractive young woman who asks for their help finding her missing sister. But there may be more to Sheila than meets the eye. Guest starring: Marta DuBois, Ron Karabatsos, Eric Server, Deborah Richter, Robert Rothwell, Sandra de Bruin, Ellen Crawford Special guest star: Dennis Franz
13	13	"Raiders of the Lost Sub"	Dennis Donnelly	Mark Jones	May 15, 1984
As the agency are experiencing a slow business week, Murray's sister, Melba (Geena Davis), arrives in town for help in proving that Hitler had a port on the west coast of the U.S. during World War II. Guest starring: Geena Davis, Stefan Gierasch, Lance Henriksen Special guest star: Steven Keats Also starring: Marsha Warfield
14	14	"Something Fishy"	Michael O'Herlihy	Frank Lupo	May 22, 1984
Boz and Nick both fall for the same beautiful dolphin trainer, whose charges become implicated as accomplices in a drug-smuggling scheme. Guest starring: Elyssa Davalos, Anthony Charnota, Christopher McDonald, Victor Mohica, Morgan Most, Judd Omen

=== Season 2 (1984–85) ===
No. overall	No. in season	Title	Directed by	Written by	Original release date
15	1	"Where the Girls Are"	Ron Satlof	Babs Greyhosky	October 2, 1984
The Riptide trio are hired to protect three high maintenance college students (Daphne Ashbrook, Juliana Donald, Claudia Christian) from kidnappers while they visit Los Angeles. Guest starring: Daphne Ashbrook, Alex McArthur, Claudia Christian, Juliana Donald, George Clooney, Don Stark, Joe W. Davis, Charlie Dell Special guest star: Ken Olandt This episode marks George Clooney's first-ever speaking role.
16	2	"The Orange Grove"	Michael Lange	Stephen J. Cannell	October 16, 1984
Brigadier General "Pitbull" Johnson (Gerald S. O'Loughlin), who the Riptide crew knew in Vietnam, is suspected of dealing cocaine, and an FBI agent (Kurtwood Smith) pressures Cody, Nick, and Boz into luring him out. Guest starring: Gerald S. O'Loughlin, Kurtwood Smith, Stanley Kamel, Al White, Michael Swan, Arnold F. Turner Special guest star: Ken Olandt
17	3	"Catch of the Day"	Michael Lange	Story by : Ed Decter; Teleplay by : Frank Lupo	October 23, 1984
A woman appears out of the water to warn Arnie, a mentally challenged fisherman and friend of the Riptide crew, that a ship is in danger. But the authorities refuse to believe him when he describes her as a mermaid, so Nick, Cody, Boz, and a reporter work to prove Arnie's telling the truth. Guest starring: Patrick Collins, Burr DeBenning, Christopher Stone, Lana Clarkson, Ken Foree, David Clover, Gene Ross, Randy Hamilton Special guest star: Tricia O'Neil
18	4	"Mirage"	Bruce Kessler	Tom Blomquist	October 30, 1984
While teaching science at the local college, Murray befriends a beautiful student who asks his help to get away from her abusive husband. He agrees to help her, but the trio soon find out that she is not as innocent as she appears to be. Guest starring: Wendy Kilbourne, Randolph Powell, Jacqueline Scott, Adam Ageli Special guest star: Kabir Bedi
19	5	"Beat the Box"	Arnold Laven	Stephen J. Cannell	November 13, 1984
Murray's lie detector causes aggravation for Nick and Cody, but also proves quite helpful when a writer they are hired to protect jumps from a high building and the journalist who hired them (Ray Wise) seemingly suffers a mental break down on air. Guest starring: Ray Wise, Joan Sweeney, William Traylor, Sal Viscuso, Jack Hogan, Geof Prysirr, Larry Gilman, Robert O'Reilly Also starring: Ken Olandt
20	6	"Father's Day"	Tony Mordente	Tom Blomquist	November 20, 1984
A troubled woman abandons her baby at a church and the priest (Robert Logan Jr.) asks the crew to look into what trouble the woman has gotten herself into. But things are more difficult than usual when the priest also leaves the baby with the boys. Guest starring: Robert Logan Jr., Sherry Hursey, Charles Cooper, Elaines Wilkes, Liz Sheridan, Steve Allie Collura, Dennis Haysbert Special guest star: Paul Gleason Also starring: Ken Olandt
21	7	"Be True to Your School"	Michael Lange	Stephen J. Cannell	November 27, 1984
Nick, Cody, and Murray go to Nick's 15-year high school reunion, which turns into a job when someone shoots up the event. Guest starring: Arthur Rosenberg, Sam J. Jones, Gerard Prendergast, Bart Braverman, Howard George, Barbara Whinnery, Charles Guardino, David Kagen, Mark Harrison Also starring: Ken Olandt
22	8	"It's a Vial Sort of Business"	Bruce Seth Green	Babs Greyhosky	December 4, 1984
Mr. and Mrs. Collins (Jason Bernard and Kim Hamilton) hire Nick & Cody to find their son (Clarence Gilyard), who dropped out of college to try to make it in Hollywood, and who is apparently tangled up in some criminal scheme. Guest starring: Alan Fudge, Joe Dorsey, Clarence Gilyard, Jason Bernard, Kim Hamilton, Vince McKewin, Fil Formicola, Ken Wright, James Andronica Also starring: Ken Olandt
23	9	"Peter Pan Is Alive and Well"	Tony Mordente	Babs Greyhosky	December 11, 1984
A manager of a beach club hires the trio to investigate the robbery of valuables on the beach, but the boys end up protecting Cody's ex-roommate, a playboy lifeguard, instead. Guest starring: Jonathan Perpich, Peter Brown, Tom McGreevy, Lynn Herring, Beth Miller, Robyn Peterson, Steve Tannen Special guest star: Fionnula Flanagan Also starring: Ken Olandt
24	10	"Catch a Fallen Star"	Mike Vejar	Tom Blomquist	December 18, 1984
The trio save an elderly woman (Edith Fellows) from a pair of thugs and soon find out that she was once a famous movie star who disappeared over fifty years earlier. Guest starring: Edith Fellows, David Ackroyd, Paul Stewart, Byron Morrow, Rachel Bard
25	11	"Gams People Play"	Ron Satlof	Tom Blomquist	January 8, 1985
The Riptide agency is hired to protect a beauty contestant whose life is being threatened. Just when they find out the identity of the stalker, the man is found dead and the woman is the prime suspect in his murder case. Game show hosts Gene Rayburn and Bob Eubanks appear as themselves. Guest starring: Rod McCary, Kelly Ann Conn, Bridget Hanley, Dennis A. Pratt, Mindi Iden Special guest star: Bill Macy Also starring: Ken Olandt
26	12	"Prisoner of War"	Michael O'Herlihy	Babs Greyhosky	January 15, 1985
After witnessing a fatal hit and run, Nick's new girlfriend disappears into the red-light district. While searching for her, they inadvertently become involved in a turf war between two local pimps. Guest starring: Nancy Stafford, Ji-Tu Cumbuka, Anthony James, Eve Roberts, Bill Quinn, Yung Sun Special guest star: Glynn Turman
27	13	"Baxter and Boz"	Michael Lange	Bill Nuss	January 22, 1985
Murray meets a famous inventor (John Astin) who's down on his luck, leading him to hire the boys to expose a dangerous design flaw in helicopters that are being sold to the US military. Guest starring: James Sloyan, Kenneth Gray, Clara Perryman, Ann Turkel, James Hornbeck, Lou Felder, Teri Ann Linn, Phil Hoover Special guest star: John Astin Also starring: Ken Olandt
28	14	"Curse of the Mary Aberdeen"	Ron Satlof	Steven L. Sears & Burt Pearl	January 29, 1985
A man who was supposed to have died 18 years before (Richard Lynch) suddenly appears to hire the agency to find the Mary Aberdeen, a cursed boat he wants to find "before it kills again." Guest starring: Bert Freed, Jack Riley, John Sanderford, Jeff Osterhage and Wolfe Perry Special guest star: Richard Lynch Also starring: Ken Olandt
29	15	"Boz Busters"	Bob Bralver	Babs Greyhosky & Tom Blomquist	February 5, 1985
After leaving the agency for his dream job at a robotics company, Murray goes missing, and Nick & Cody have to find him before he disappears forever. Guest starring: Mitchell Ryan, Rosalind Cash, Catherine Shirriff, Joseph Chapman, Robert Symonds, Will MacMillan, Gela Nash-Taylor, Clare Torao, Tom Williams, Sue Giosa Also starring: Ken Olandt
30	16	"Oil Bets Are Off"	Michael Lange	Paul Bernbaum	February 12, 1985
When she believes the police aren't properly investigating her father's murder, oil heiress Juliet Hafner (Joanna Johnson) hires the trio to look into the case. Guest starring: Joanna Johnson, Seth Jaffe, Cástulo Guerra, Shawn Ora Engemann, Tony Goodstone, Guy Christopher, J. Bill Jones
31	17	"Girls Night Out"	Bob Bralver	Steve Beers & Alan Cassidy	February 19, 1985
Two suburban women (Belinda Montgomery, Lenore Kasdorf) are forced by a loan shark (James Cromwell) to become burglars to pay him back. After they are caught hitting the Riptide, the boys decide to help them to get out of their predicament. Guest starring: Lenore Kasdorf, James Cromwell, Jeannetta Arnette, Mark Schneider, Milt Oberman Special guest star: Belinda Montgomery
32	18	"Polly Want an Explanation"	Michael Switzer	Jim Carlson & Terrence McDonnell	March 5, 1985
The Riptide agency, a wannabe-FBI agent, trouble prone con man Mack McPherson (William Russ) and his parrot all get in trouble with organized crime after McPherson writes an incriminating article about a mobster. Guest starring: Robin Riker, William Russ, John McLiam, Richard McGonagle, Gary Wood, Phil Rubenstein, Bob Larkin Also starring: Ken Olandt
33	19	"The Twisted Cross"	Robert Sallin	Story by : James Andronica; Teleplay by : Tom Blomquist	March 12, 1985
The trio are hired by a woman whose ex-husband won't let her see her son. They soon learn that the father is part of a neo-Nazi group led by a man named Kefler (Jere Burns). Guest starring: Robert Gray, Katherine Cannon, Jere Burns, Randy Norton, Millie Slavin, Cameron Thor, Christopher Michael Moore, Corkey Ford Also starring: Ken Olandt Due to its content, this episode was never broadcast in Germany until it was aired in 2013 on PayTV
34	20	"Fuzzy Vision"	Bruce Kessler	Paul Bernbaum	March 19, 1985
The trio head out to sea for a vacation of relaxing and fishing, but their plans are stopped when the armature blows on the boat and they're trapped in a weird little town where a woman who can see into the future (Jan Sterling) is suspected of murder and everybody thinks Cody is the infamous and very unpopular Jake Tyler. Guest starring: Jan Sterling, Kevyn Major Howard, Bill McKinney, Lynn Hamilton, Woody Eney, Arnold Johnson, Jon Van Ness, T. G. Sheppard, Scott Lincoln, William Boyett, Med Flory, Kay Freeman
35	21	"Arrivederci, Baby"	Michael Lange	Babs Greyhosky	May 7, 1985
Oceanographer Angelo Guirilini (Cesar Romero) hires the trio to investigate when his son is badly wounded under mysterious circumstances during a diving expedition. Guest starring: Dana Elcar, Ava Lazar, Russell Todd, Glenn Morrissey, Steve Lattanzi, Bradford English, Nick Cavanaugh, James Andronica Special guest star: Cesar Romero Dana Elcar stars as Harry "The Oilman" Silverman.
36	22	"Harmony and Grits"	Bob Bralver	Tom Blomquist & Babs Greyhosky	May 14, 1985
Murray drags a reluctant Nick and Cody to a "harmonising" seminar. But the topic of the seminar takes a back seat to a large brawl and a concerned wife who's afraid her husband is having an affair. Guest starring: Lee Bryant, Lyle Alzado, Dean Wein, Peter Jason, Francine York, Christopher Thomas, Kathryn Skatula

=== Season 3 (1985–86) ===
No. overall	No. in season	Title	Directed by	Written by	Original release date
37	1	"Wipe Out"	Bob Bralver	Tom Blomquist	October 1, 1985
Hard up for work, the Riptide crew reluctantly take on the case sent to them anonymously, asking them to investigate the death of a surfer that took place in 1964. Guest starring: Richard Hatch, Simone Griffeth, Suzanne Snyder, Ted Neeley, Mitchell Anderson, Michael Galardi
38	2	"Thirty-Six Hours Till Dawn"	Bob Bralver	Babs Greyhosky	October 22, 1985
The Riptide Agency are hired to escort Renee Sinclair, the estranged wife of underworld crime-lord Sonny Sinclair, to his trial where she is to be the star prosecution witness. During the extraction, Nick and Renee are trapped in a canyon together, and Cody and Murray have to find them before Sinclair's people do. Guest starring: Cristina Raines, Michael MacRae, Stewart Moss, Cástulo Guerra, George Clifton
39	3	"Does Not Compute"	Michael Lange	Tom Blomquist	October 29, 1985
After a liberal city councilman (Larry Linville) accuses the police department of framing him for corruption, Lt. Quinlan hires the crew to prove the police department innocent. Murray's investigation angers the hacker behind the attacks, and he turns his eyes to the Riptide. Guest starring: Larry Linville, Nicholas Pryor, Tracy Reed, Sharon Barr, Johnny Lee, Howard Caine, Jack Wells, Toni Attell, Jerry Potter
40	4	"The Bargain Department"	Kim Manners	Stephen J. Cannell	November 5, 1985
After their insurance is mysteriously cancelled, Cody and Murray opt to sell the agency to a corporate investigation firm led by Oscar Davenport (Robert Walker, Jr.), whose offer also includes jobs for the three of them, over Nick's strenuous objections. Their new jobs turn out to be anything but ideal, and Cody, Nick, and Murray team up to find out what was really behind the failure of the Riptide Detective Agency. Guest starring: Robert Walker, Jr., Kate Charleson, Tom McFadden, William Cort, George Solomon, Jan Merlin, Solomon Trager
41	5	"Who Really Watches the Sunset?"	Michael Lange	Burt Pearl & Steven L. Sears	November 12, 1985
A reporter with only six months to live (Darleen Carr) hires the trio to find out who infected her with the disease that will kill her. Guest starring: Darleen Carr, Harvey Vernon, Paul Willson, Jim Bentley and Nancy Linari Special guest star: Daryl Anderson
42	6	"Still Goin' Steady"	Michael Switzer	Terry D. Nelson	November 19, 1985
Murray's lucrative winning streak on a popular quiz show is in jeopardy when his high-school crush arrives asking for his help, and Nick and Cody soon find out she's not all she appears to be. Guest starring: Kay Lenz, Michael Lombard, James Carroll Jordan, Johnny Mountain
43	7	"Robin and Marian"	Robert Sallin	Paul Bernbaum	December 3, 1985
When the Riptide is burgled and the Roboz stolen, the guys track the goods down to a man who considers himself a modern day Robin Hood, stealing from the rich to give to the poor--and the "rich" unfortunately includes a dangerous counterfeiting gang who are desperate to get their property back. Guest starring: Walter Olkewicz, Miriam Flynn, Frank Ramírez, Michael Champion, Geno Silva, Rex Ryon, Scott Nemes, Gabriel Damon, Olivia Burnette, Suzanne Dunn
44	8	"Requiem for Icarus"	Chuck Bowman	Burt Pearl & Steven L. Sears	December 10, 1985
Nick meets up with an old friend who he hasn't seen or heard from in five years, after his daughter becomes concerned about her father's erratic behavior. Saving him becomes all more important for the team once they find out he is both suicidal and deeply involved in a smuggling operation. Guest starring: Clu Gulager, Lisa Denton, Carl Franklin, Carl Strano, Gus Corrado Last appearance of Jack Ging as Lt. Quinlan.
45	9	"Home for Christmas"	James Whitmore, Jr.	Tom Blomquist	December 17, 1985
Rather than celebrate a holiday he hates, Nick spends his Christmas escorting the remains of a young soldier home to his father (James Whitmore), only to find out upon arrival that the body doesn't belong to the man's deceased son. Guest starring: Ken Swofford, J.D. Hinton, Fred Grossinger, Hugh Gillin, Anne Bellamy, Stephen Liska Special guest star: James Whitmore
46	10	"Lady Killer"	Michael Lange	Tom Blomquist & Babs Greyhosky	January 7, 1986
A serial killer is targeting engaged women in King Harbor, and the crew meet their new police contact: a gorgeous blonde named Lt. Joanne Parisi. Guest starring: Robin Strand, Eli Marder, Brian Matthews
47	11	"A Matter of Policy"	Michael Preece	Steven L. Sears & Burt Pearl	January 14, 1986
While Murray is off at a computer conference, Nick learns he's inherited a large sum of money from the recently deceased father of a soldier he tried to save in Vietnam, but according to the dead man's niece (Kim Darby), his death was no accident. Guest starring: Kim Darby, Richard Sanders, John S. Ragin, James F. Kelly, Jay Ingram, F. William Parker, Alice Nunn, Brad Harris
48	12	"The Wedding Bell Blues"	Michael Switzer	Tom Blomquist & Babs Greyhosky	January 21, 1986
Cody, Nick and Murray are hired by an eccentric millionaire (Richard Lewis) to find a model that he wants to marry--only to be caught up in a heated mob war between the model's family and the family of her jilted fiancé. Guest starring: Richard Lewis, Paul Lambert, Al Ruscio, Molly Fontaine, Arthur Taxier, James Purcell, Christian LeBlanc, James Staley
49	13	"The Frankie Kahana Show"	Bruce Kessler	Frank Lupo	February 11, 1986
When their night out is interrupted by someone attempting to kill their host, a Hawaiian lounge singer, the crew end up embroiled in the case. Guest starring: Andy Bumatai, Cal Bellini, Jeri Gaile, Charles Tyner, Jineane Ford, Harold Ayer, Nathan Jung
50	14	"Smiles We Left Behind"	Tony Mordente	Babs Greyhosky	February 25, 1986
51	15	"Smiles We Left Behind"	Tony Mordente	Babs Greyhosky	February 25, 1986
When Danny Lee doesn't arrive from San Francisco for his cousin's wedding, the crew offer to go to San Francisco to pick him up. Soon they realize that more than Lucy's wedding is at stake--the case involves attempted murder, espionage, nuclear secrets, and more dangerously, Cody's ex-fiancée, Janet (Jane Badler). Guest starring: Jane Badler, Anna Bjorn, Joel Brooks, Rosalind Chao, George Cheung, Christopher Pennock, Ben Slack, Scott DeVenney, B.J. McAllister, Norman Lee Harris, Richard Partlow
52	16	"The Pirate and the Princess"	Kim Manners	Terry D. Nelson	March 7, 1986
The Riptide crew reunites with Angelo and Giovanna Guirilini (Cesar Romero and Ava Lazar from Season 2's Arrivederci, Baby) as they try to find the lost treasure of pirate captain William Tyson. Guest starring: Ava Lazar, Christopher Cary, Paul Land, Warren Berlinger, Russell Todd, Christopher Neame, Cesar Romero and Stan Haze
53	17	"Playing Hardball"	Bob Bralver	Paul Bernbaum	March 14, 1986
Cody and Nick go undercover as baseball players at the behest of the minor league team's owner to investigate a drug problem in the locker room. Guest starring: Nicholas Guest, Ray Abruzzo, Linda Thompson, Barbi Benton, Robert Hanley Special guest star: Steve Allen
54	18	"The Play's the Thing"	Richard Forrest	Tom Blomquist	March 21, 1986
A string of murders is connected to the search for an undiscovered Shakespeare manuscript and the Riptide agency unhappily teams up with Gloria Burghoff (last seen in Season 2's Polly Want An Explanation) to find it. Guest starring: Frances Bay, Gino Conforti, Bernard Fox, Terry Kiser, David Ruprecht, Joseph Ruskin, David White, Robin Riker
55	19	"Dead Men Don't Floss"	Chuck Bowman	Story by : Steven L. Sears & Burt Pearl; Teleplay by : Tom Blomquist & Babs Greyhosky & Frank Lupo	April 4, 1986
When an article in a magazine praises Nick for "his" agency, the guys each take a separate case to see which of the three is really the best detective. Meanwhile, the author's jealous boyfriend (Christopher McDonald) is on the hunt for Nick. Guest starring: Dennis Burkley, Danny Cooksey, Stephen James, Lu Leonard, Christopher McDonald, Lee Wilkof, Lisa Nelson, Peggy Walton-Walker, Laurie Ambert, Kit Fredericks, Carmen Filpi, Jeff Silverman
56	20	"Chapel of Glass"	Bob Bralver	Steven L. Sears & Burt Pearl	April 11, 1986
As Lt. Parisi's wedding nears, a case the guys are working on strikes close to home, and may call into question everything she knows, as her fiancé is implicated in a deadly scheme. Guest starring: Vincent Baggetta, Michael Lally, Cliff Emmich, R.J. Bonds, Lewis Dauber
57	21	"If You Can't Beat 'Em, Join 'Em"	Tony Mordente	Tom Blomquist & Babs Greyhosky	April 18, 1986
The Riptide Detective Agency is hired to consult for a new detective television show. The lead actors (H. Richard Greene, Annette McCarthy) follow the guys around over a week while investigating an actual case. Guest starring: Annette McCarthy, H. Richard Greene, Thom Sharp, Al Pugliese
58	22	"Echoes"	Perry King	Babs Greyhosky	April 22, 1986
While investigating a case, Cody is shot and Murray is forced to kill the shooter. While Cody recovers in the hospital, Nick and Murray hunt for the truth. Guest starring: Lonny Chapman, Elinor Donahue, James Lemp, Linda Hoy, Chuck Lindsly, Hap Lawrence, Jon Locke, Walker Edmiston Series star Perry King (Cody) directed this series finale.

== Reception ==
=== Critical response ===
For the first season, on the review aggregator website Rotten Tomatoes, 30% of 10 critics' reviews are positive. The website's consensus reads: "Cobbled together from the spare parts of just about every other action series preceding it, Riptide isn't fun enough to make up for its complete lack of originality."

== Home media ==
=== United States ===
Sony Pictures Home Entertainment released a three-disc DVD set of Riptide: The Complete First Season on February 14, 2006.

=== Canada ===
Visual Entertainment has released all three seasons of Riptide. However, several episodes have music replaced and sequences edited out due to copyright issues. On October 14, 2008, VEI released Riptide: The Complete Series, a 13-disc box set featuring all 58 episodes of the show. This set was initially scheduled to be released on September 9, 2008, but was delayed for unknown reasons. As of 2013, these releases have been discontinued and are out of print.

DVD name	Ep. #	Release date
Riptide: The Complete First Season	14	November 7, 2006
Riptide: The Complete Second Season	22	October 30, 2007
Riptide: The Complete Third and Final Season	22	February 12, 2008
Riptide: The Complete Series	58	October 14, 2008

=== Germany ===
The series was known as Trio mit vier Fäusten (Trio with Four Fists) in this country.

Universum Films has released all three seasons of Riptide on May 29, 2009 (Season 1), July 31, 2009 (Season 2) and September 25, 2009 (Season 3).

The DVD sets feature a bonus episode of 21 Jump Street (Season 1). The Season 2 sets contain an episode not broadcast in Germany, "The Twisted Cross", in English with German subtitles. The German box sets have the original music of the U.S. series, unlike the Canadian box sets 2 and 3.
