= Anderson Cooper =

American journalist (born 1967)

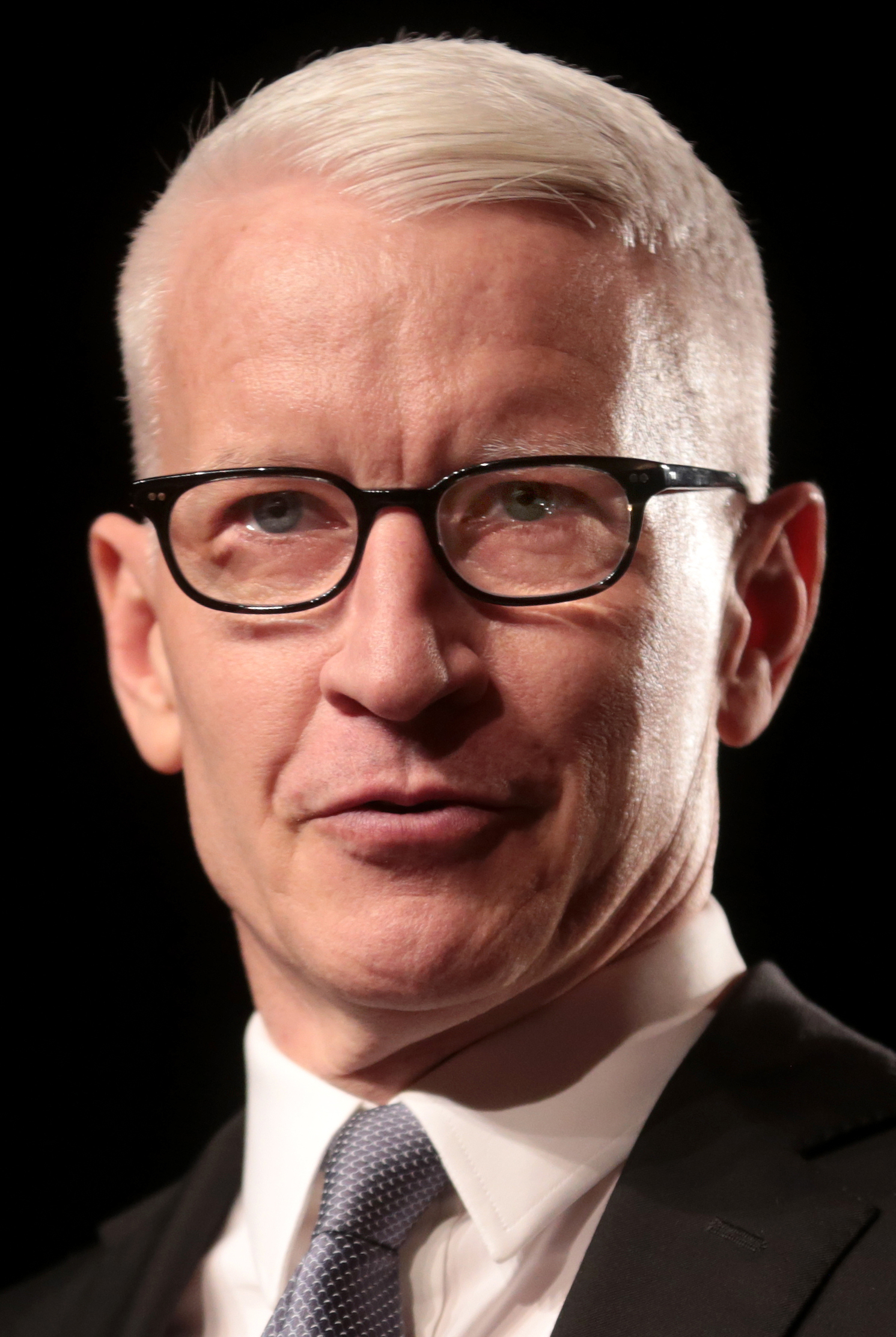
- Cooper in 2018
- Born: Anderson Hays Cooper; June 3, 1967 (age 59); New York City, New York, U.S.
- Education: Yale University (BA)
- Occupations: Broadcast journalist; political commentator
- Years active: 1990–present
- Employers: Channel One News (1990–1995); ABC News (1995–2000); CNN (2001–present); 60 Minutes (2006–2026)
- Television: Anderson Cooper 360°; Anderson Live; Anderson Cooper Full Circle; The Whole Story with Anderson Cooper
- Children: 2
- Parents: Wyatt Emory Cooper; Gloria Vanderbilt
- Relatives: Vanderbilt family

Anderson Hays Cooper (born June 3, 1967) is an American broadcast journalist and political commentator who anchors the CNN news broadcast show Anderson Cooper 360°. In addition to his duties at CNN, for two decades Cooper served as a correspondent for 60 Minutes, produced by CBS News. After graduating from Yale University with a Bachelor of Arts in 1989, he began traveling the world, shooting footage of war-torn regions for Channel One News. Cooper was hired by ABC News as a correspondent in 1995, but he soon took more jobs throughout the network, working for a short time as a co-anchor, reality game show host, and fill-in morning talk show host.

In 2001, Cooper joined CNN, where he was given his own show, Anderson Cooper 360°; he has remained the show's host since. He developed a reputation for his on-the-ground reporting of breaking news events, with his coverage of Hurricane Katrina causing his popularity to sharply increase. For his coverage of the 2010 Haiti earthquake, Cooper received a National Order of Honour and Merit, the highest honor granted by the Haitian government. From September 2011 to May 2013, he also served as the host of his own syndicated television daytime talk show, Anderson Live.

Cooper has won 18 Emmy Awards and two Peabody Awards, as well as an Edward Murrow Award from the Overseas Press Club in 2011. A member of the Vanderbilt family, he also came out as gay in 2012.

== Early life and education ==
Anderson Hays Cooper was born on June 3, 1967 in Manhattan, New York City, the younger son of writer Wyatt Emory Cooper and artist Gloria Vanderbilt. His maternal grandparents were millionaire equestrian Reginald Claypoole Vanderbilt of the Vanderbilt family and socialite Gloria Morgan Vanderbilt, and Reginald's patrilineal great-grandfather was business magnate Cornelius Vanderbilt, who founded the prominent Vanderbilt shipping and railroad fortune. He has two older half-brothers, Leopold Stanislaus "Stan" Stokowski and Christopher Stokowski, from Gloria's ten-year marriage to conductor Leopold Stokowski. In 2014, Cooper appeared in Henry Louis Gates Jr.'s Finding Your Roots, where he learned of an ancestor, Burwell Boykin, who was a slave owner from the southern United States.

Cooper grew up in the Upper East Side neighborhood of Manhattan and in Southampton, Long Island. His media experience began early. As a baby, he was photographed by Diane Arbus for Harper's Bazaar. At the age of three, Cooper was a guest on The Tonight Show on September 17, 1970, appearing with his mother. At the age of nine, he appeared on To Tell the Truth as an impostor. From age 10 to 13, Cooper modeled with Ford Models for Ralph Lauren, Calvin Klein and Macy's.

Wyatt experienced a series of heart attacks while undergoing open-heart surgery, and died January 5, 1978, at the age of 50. Cooper considers his father's book Families to be "sort of a guide on... how he would have wanted me to live my life and the choices he would have wanted me to make. And so I feel very connected to him."

On July 22, 1988, his older brother, Carter Vanderbilt Cooper, jumped to his death from the 14th-floor terrace of Vanderbilt's New York City penthouse apartment. Gloria Vanderbilt later wrote about her son's death in the book A Mother's Story, in which she expressed her belief that the suicide was caused by a psychotic episode induced by an allergy to the anti-asthma prescription drug salbutamol. Carter's suicide sparked Anderson's interest in journalism:

Loss is a theme that I think a lot about, and it's something in my work that I dwell on. I think when you experience any kind of loss, especially the kind I did, you have questions about survival: Why do some people thrive in situations that others can't tolerate? Would I be able to survive and get on in the world on my own?

Cooper attended the Dalton School, a private co-educational day school on the Upper East Side. At age 17, after graduating from Dalton a semester early, Cooper traveled around Africa for several months on a "survival trip". He contracted malaria on the trip and was hospitalized in Kenya. Describing the experience, Cooper wrote "Africa was a place to forget and be forgotten in." Cooper attended Yale University, where he resided in Trumbull College and was a coxswain on the lightweight rowing team. He was inducted into the Manuscript Society and majored in political science, graduating with a Bachelor of Arts in 1989.

== Career ==
=== Early career ===
During college, Cooper spent two summers as an intern at the Central Intelligence Agency (CIA) while studying political science. He pursued journalism with no formal journalistic education. He is a self-proclaimed "news junkie since [he] was in utero".

=== Channel One ===
After Cooper graduated from Yale, he tried to gain entry-level employment with ABC answering telephones, but was unsuccessful. Finding it hard to get his foot in the door of on-air reporting, Cooper decided to enlist the help of a friend in making a fake press pass. At the time, Cooper was working as a fact checker for the small news agency Channel One, which produced a youth-oriented news program that was broadcast to many junior high and high schools in the United States. Cooper then entered Myanmar on his own with his forged press pass and met with students fighting the Burmese government.

After reporting from Myanmar, Cooper lived in Vietnam for a year to study the Vietnamese language at the University of Hanoi. Persuading Channel One to allow him to bring a Hi8 camera with him, Cooper began filming and assembling reports of Vietnamese life and culture that aired on Channel One. In 1992, he filmed stories from Somalia, Bosnia, and Rwanda.

After having been on such assignments for a couple of years, Cooper realized in 1994 that he had slowly become desensitized to the violence he was witnessing around him; the horrors of the Rwandan genocide became trivial: "I would see a dozen bodies and think, you know, it's a dozen, it's not so bad." One particular incident, however, snapped him out of it:

On the side of the road [Cooper] came across five bodies that had been in the sun for several days. The skin of a woman's hand was peeling off like a glove. Revealing macabre fascination, Cooper whipped out his disposable camera and took a closeup photograph for his personal album. As he did, someone took a photo of him. Later that person showed Cooper the photo, saying, "You need to take a look at what you were doing." "And that's when I realized I've got to stop, [...] I've got to report on some state fairs or a beauty pageant or something, to just, like, remind myself of some perspective."

=== ABC ===
In 1995, Cooper became a correspondent for ABC News, eventually rising to the position of co-anchor on its overnight World News Now program on September 21, 1999. In 2000, he switched career paths, taking a job as the host of ABC's reality show The Mole:

My last year at ABC, I was working overnights anchoring this newscast, then during the day at 20/20. So I was sleeping in two- or four-hour shifts, and I was really tired and wanted a change. I wanted to clear my head and get out of news a little bit, and I was interested in reality TV—and it was interesting.

Cooper was also a fill-in co-host for Regis Philbin on Live with Regis and Kelly in 2007 when Philbin underwent triple-bypass heart surgery. As of 2019, he still periodically serves as guest co-host on Live when one of the two hosts cannot go in to work.

=== CNN ===
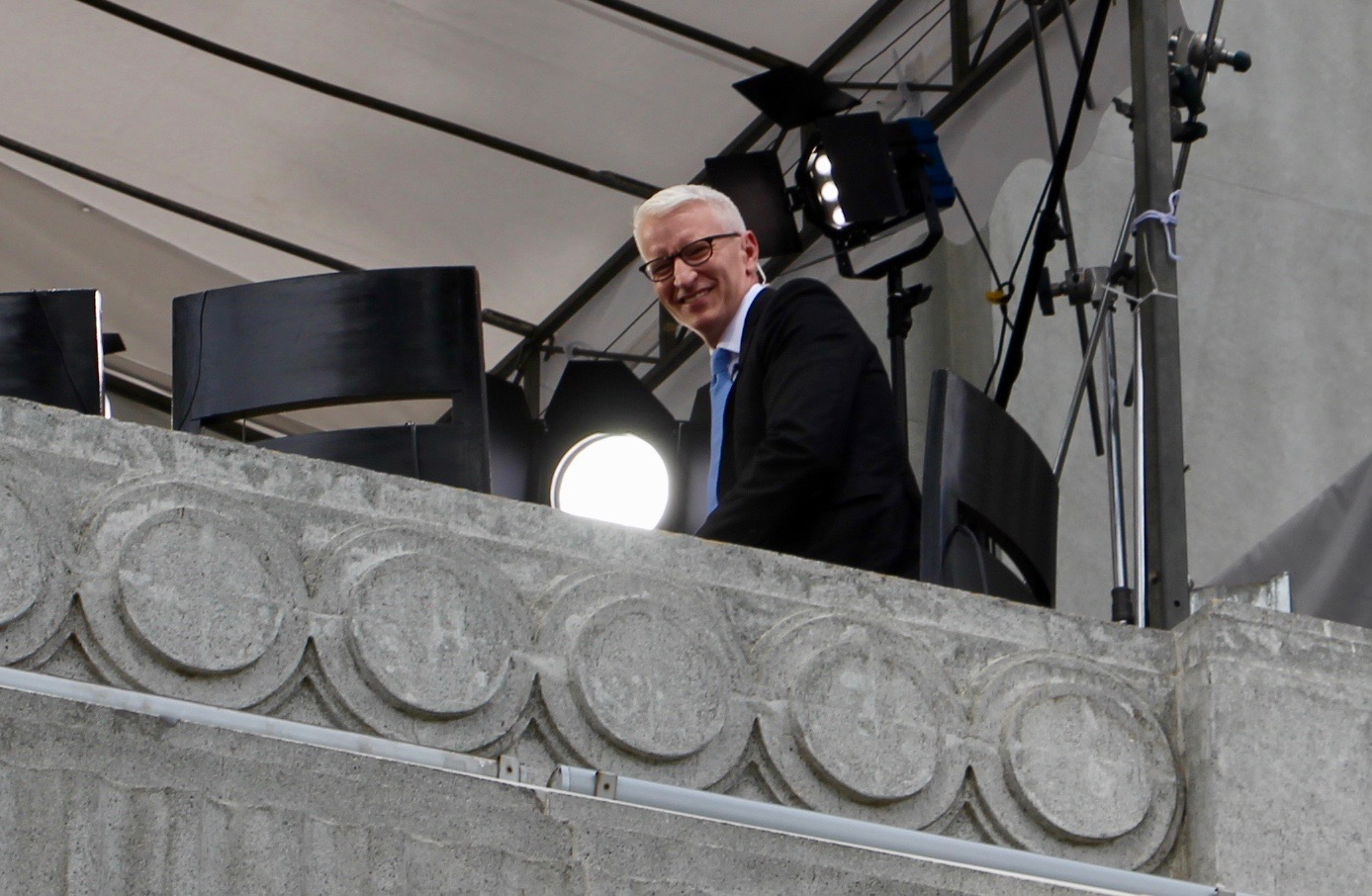
Anderson Cooper covering the Trump/Kim Summit in Singapore, 2018

Cooper left The Mole after its second season to return to broadcast news. In 2001, he joined CNN, commenting, "Two seasons was enough, and 9/11 happened, and I thought I needed to be getting back to news." His first position at CNN was to anchor alongside Paula Zahn on American Morning. In 2002, he became CNN's weekend prime-time anchor. Since 2002, he has hosted CNN's New Year's Eve special from Times Square.

==== Anderson Cooper 360° ====
On September 8, 2003, Cooper became the anchor of Anderson Cooper 360° on CNN. Describing his philosophy as an anchor, he has said:

I think the notion of traditional anchor is fading away, the all-knowing, all-seeing person who speaks from on high. I don't think the audience really buys that anymore. As a viewer, I know I don't buy it. I think you have to be yourself, and you have to be real and you have to admit what you don't know, and talk about what you do know, and talk about what you don't know as long as you say you don't know it. I tend to relate more to people on television who are just themselves, for good or for bad, than I do to someone who I believe is putting on some sort of persona. The anchorman on The Simpsons is a reasonable facsimile of some anchors who have that problem.

In 2005, Cooper covered the tsunami damage in Sri Lanka; the Cedar Revolution in Beirut, Lebanon; the death of Pope John Paul II; and the royal wedding of Prince Charles and Camilla Parker Bowles. In August 2005, he covered the Niger famine from Maradi.

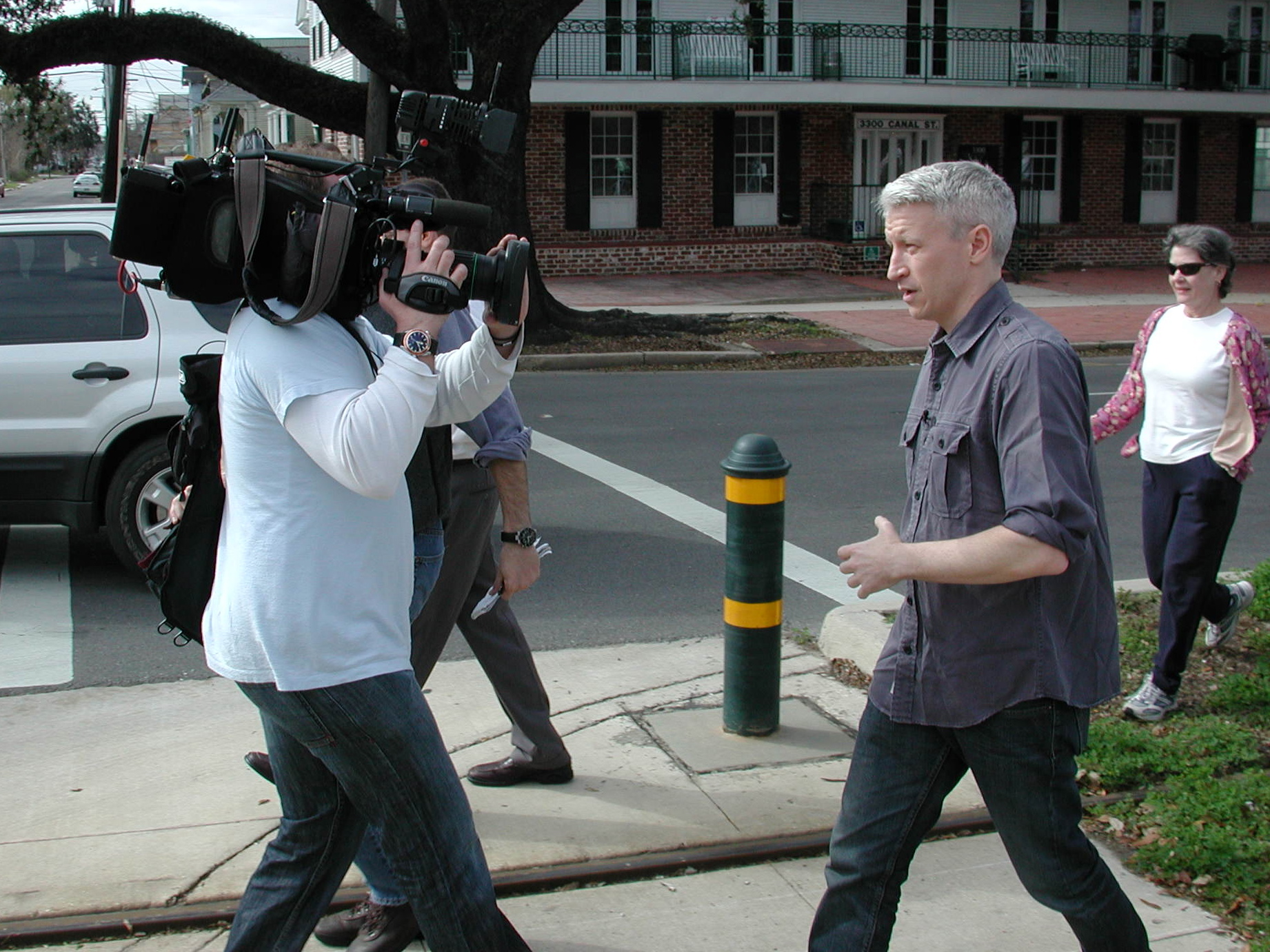
Cooper covering a 2007 protest of the government response to Hurricane Katrina

In 2005, during CNN coverage of the aftermath of Hurricane Katrina, he confronted Sen. Mary Landrieu, Sen. Trent Lott, and the Reverend Jesse Jackson about their perception of the government response. As Cooper said later in an interview with New York magazine, "Yeah, I would prefer not to be emotional and I would prefer not to get upset, but it's hard not to when you're surrounded by brave people who are suffering and in need." A contributor to Broadcasting & Cable magazine wrote: "In its aftermath, Hurricane Katrina served to usher in a new breed of emo-journalism, skyrocketing CNN's Anderson Cooper to superstardom as CNN's golden boy and a darling of the media circles because of his impassioned coverage of the storm."

In September 2005, the format of CNN's NewsNight was changed from 60 to 120 minutes to cover the unusually violent hurricane season. To help distribute some of the increased workload, Cooper was temporarily added as co-anchor to Aaron Brown. This arrangement was reported to have been made permanent the same month by the president of CNN's U.S. operations, Jonathan Klein, who has called Cooper "the anchorperson of the future". Following the addition of Cooper, the ratings for NewsNight increased significantly; Klein remarked that "[Cooper's] name has been on the tip of everyone's tongue." To further capitalize on this, Klein announced a major programming shakeup on November 2, 2005. Cooper's 360° program would be expanded to two hours and shifted into the 10:00 pm ET slot formerly held by NewsNight, with the third hour of Wolf Blitzer's The Situation Room filling in Cooper's former 7:00 pm ET slot. With "no options" left for him to host shows, Aaron Brown left CNN, ostensibly having "mutually agreed" with Jonathan Klein on the matter.

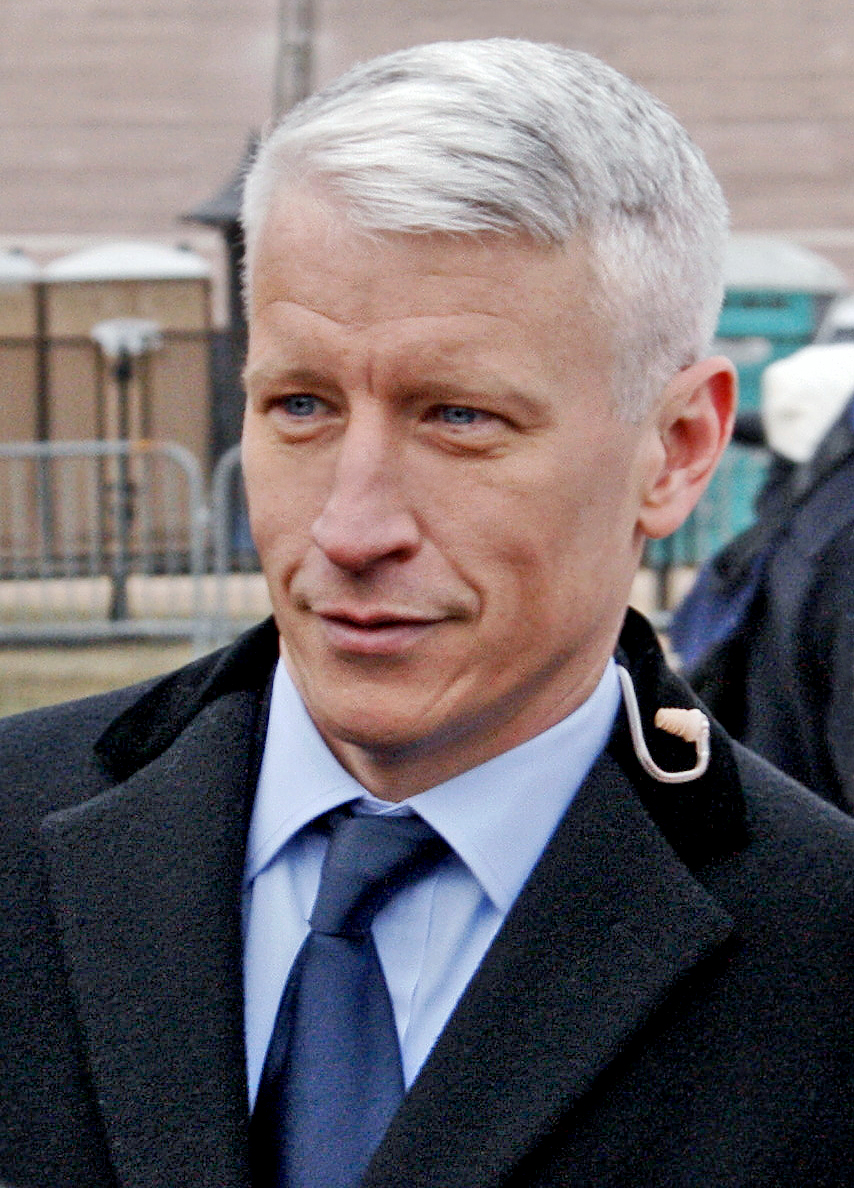
Cooper at the inauguration of President Obama in Washington, D.C., 2009

In early 2007, Cooper signed a multi-year deal with CNN that would allow him to continue as a contributor to es, as well as doubling his salary from $2 million annually to a reported $4 million.

==== The Whole Story with Anderson Cooper ====
On April 16, 2023, CNN launched a new Sunday primetime series, The Whole Story with Anderson Cooper.

==== CNN Heroes: An All-Star Tribute ====
In 2007, he began hosting CNN Heroes: An All-Star Tribute, a show about extraordinary deeds by ordinary people.

==== Planet in Peril documentary ====
In October 2007, Cooper began hosting the documentary Planet in Peril with Sanjay Gupta and Jeff Corwin on CNN. In 2008, Cooper, Gupta, and Lisa Ling from National Geographic Explorer teamed up for a sequel, Planet in Peril: Battle Lines, which premiered in December 2008.

==== Syndicated talk show: Anderson Live ====
In September 2010, Warner Bros. and Telepictures (both corporate siblings of CNN) announced that Cooper had signed an agreement to host a nationally syndicated talk show. The journalist Brian Stelter (at the time employed by The New York Times, and now by CNN), reported on Twitter that the new Warner Bros. daytime talk show would be named Anderson (now titled Anderson Live). The show premiered on September 12, 2011, and as part of negotiations over the talk show deal, Cooper signed a new multi-year contract with CNN to continue as the host of Anderson Cooper 360°. On October 29, 2012, it was announced that Anderson Live would end at the conclusion of its second season. The show, slightly renamed after season one and revamped with a variety of co-hosts, failed to achieve the ratings distributor Warner Brothers hoped for. The final Anderson Live aired on May 30, 2013.

==== 2016 presidential debates ====
Along with Martha Raddatz, Cooper moderated the second presidential election debate between Hillary Clinton and Donald Trump. This made him the first LGBT person to moderate a presidential debate in the general election.

==== New Year's Eve ====
In 2017, Cooper's close friend, Andy Cohen, joined Cooper in succeeding Kathy Griffin as co-host of CNN's New Year's Eve coverage. They again co-hosted CNN's New Year's Eve for 2018, 2019, 2020, 2021, 2022, 2023, and 2025.

=== 60 Minutes ===
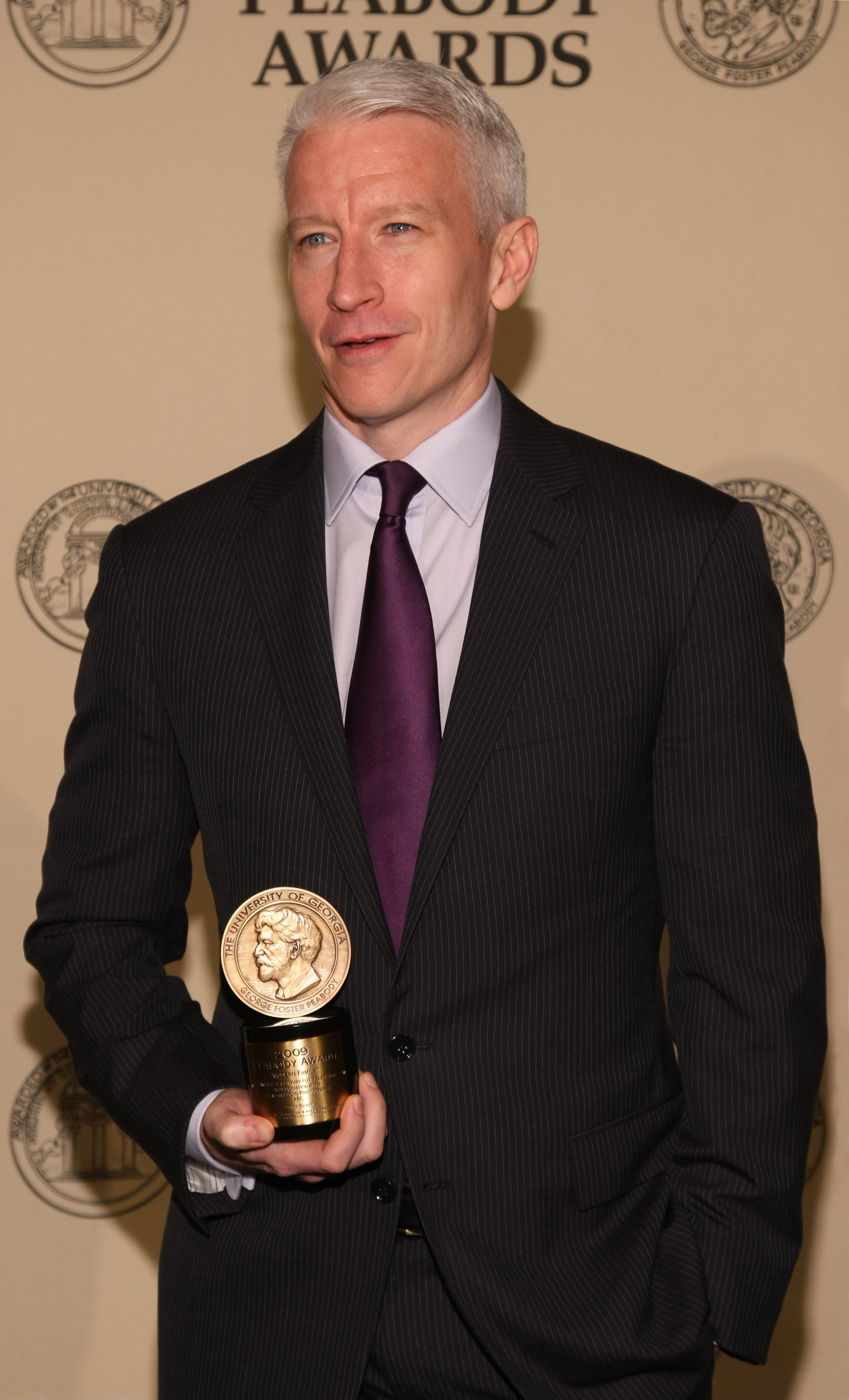
Cooper at the 71st Annual Peabody Awards (Astoria Hotel, May 21, 2012)

Cooper became a correspondent for the CBS News program 60 Minutes in the 2006–2007 season, concurrently serving as a CNN anchor and correspondent. He left the CBS role in 2026.

=== Other work ===
==== AC2 ====
Andy Cohen and Cooper announced that they would be going on a national tour to perform their conversational stage show AC2 beginning in March 2015. The tour opened in Boston, followed by Miami Beach, Chicago and Atlanta. The idea for the show came about after Cooper interviewed Cohen about his then-latest book, The Andy Cohen Diaries, at an event at the 92nd Street Y in New York City. Since then, the two-man show has continued to tour, reaching more than fifty cities as of October 2018.

==== Broadway ====
Cooper was the narrator for the 2011 Broadway revival of How to Succeed in Business Without Really Trying, directed by Rob Ashford and starring Daniel Radcliffe.

==== Writings ====
A freelance writer, Cooper has authored a variety of articles that have appeared in many other outlets, including Details magazine.

In May 2006, Cooper published a memoir for HarperCollins, Dispatches from the Edge, detailing his life and work in Sri Lanka, Africa, Iraq and Louisiana over the previous year. Some of the book's proceeds are donated to charity. The book topped The New York Times Best Seller list on June 18, 2006.

In 2017, Cooper and his mother, Gloria Vanderbilt, co-authored The Rainbow Comes and Goes: A Mother and Son on Life, Love, and Loss. Compiled from a series of emails, the memoir recounts their shared past, and Vanderbilt's tumultuous childhood. Cooper said his goal in writing the book and correspondence was to leave "nothing left unsaid" between the pair. It landed on multiple best-seller lists the year of its publication.

==== Jeopardy! ====
From April 19 to 30, 2021, Cooper served as a guest host on Jeopardy! following the death of Alex Trebek.

==== Podcast: All There Is ====
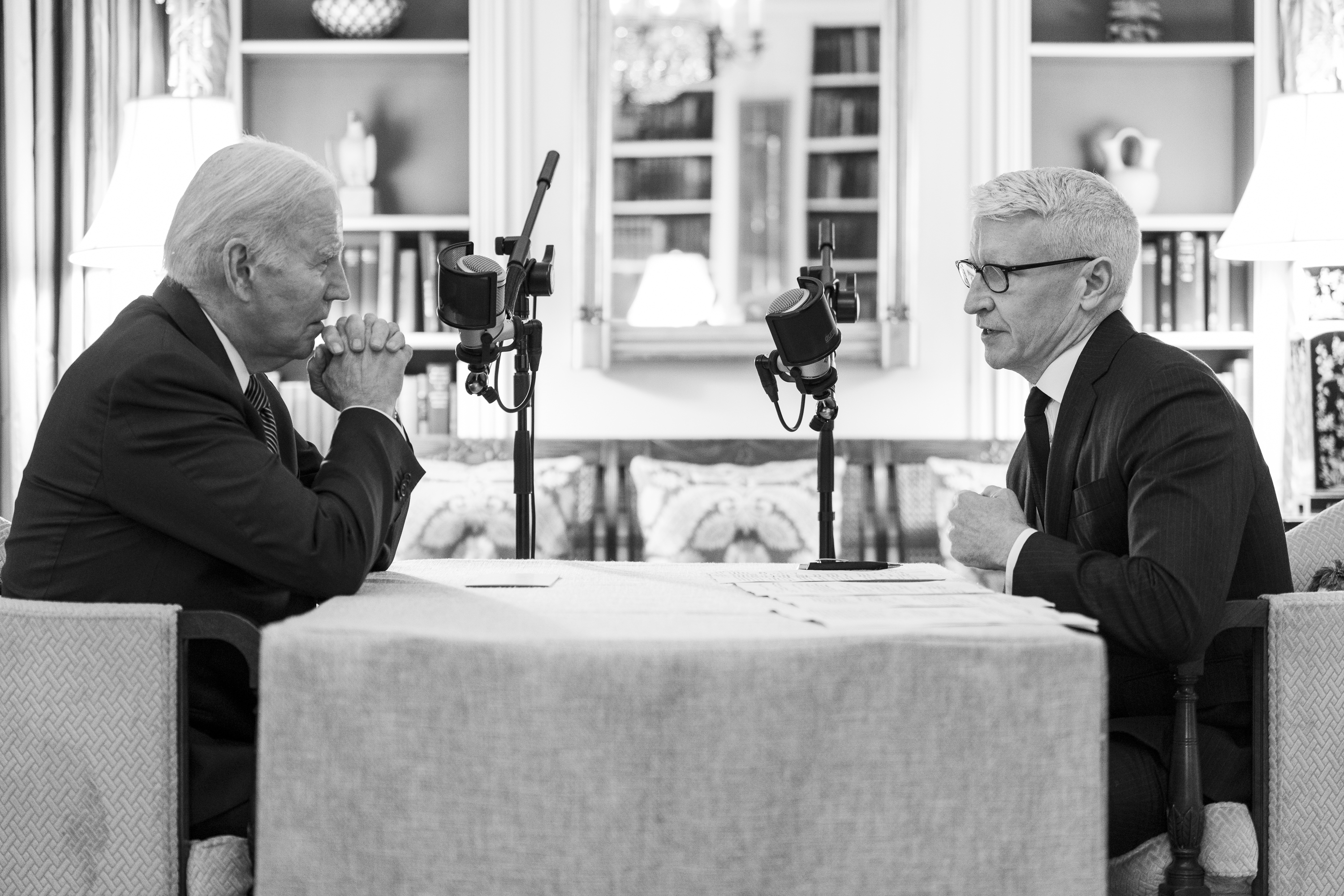
Cooper recording a podcast episode with US president Joe Biden in 2023

In 2022, Cooper launched a deeply personal podcast exploring grief and loss. On the show, he interviews other notable people on their experiences with grief. Guests have included TV host Stephen Colbert, musician Laurie Anderson and comedian Molly Shannon. The inspiration for the podcast came from his own life. Reflecting on the loss of his father when he was 10, the loss of his brother to suicide at 21, and the more recent loss of his mother, he said "What has struck me is the degree to which I had not dealt with this stuff at all." He shared that he wanted to explore this universal human experience. "I just felt like, 'Why am I so alone in this? This is something we all go through.' And this idea gave me great strength, that I'm on a road that has been traveled by everybody, in one form or another. Why every time somebody is going down this road should it feel like the first time?"

Cooper won a 2023 Webby Award for Best Series for All There Is. His 5-word acceptance speech was "All There Is, Is Love."

== Personal life ==
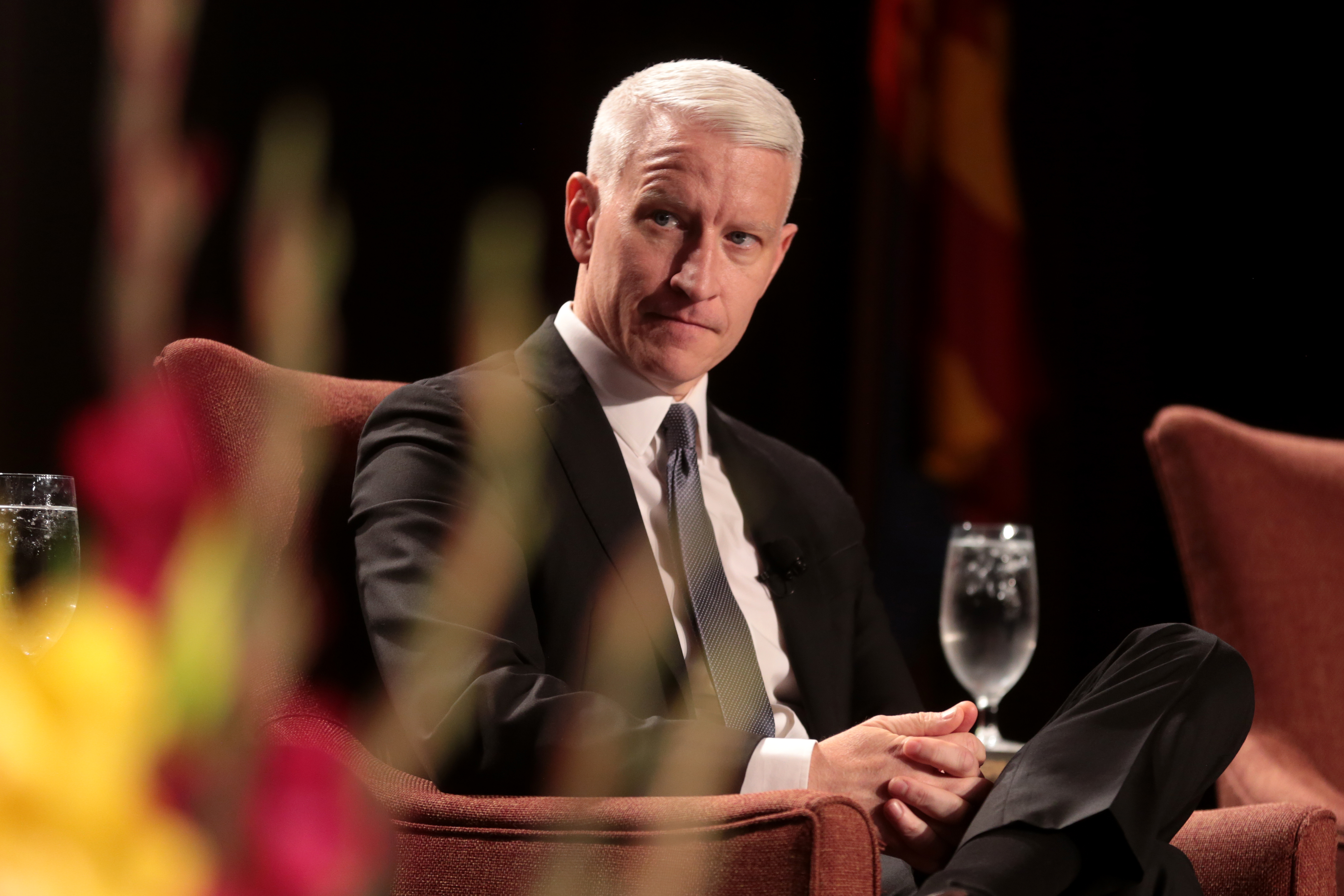
Cooper in 2018

As of 2016, Cooper was not registered to any political party.

In 2008, Cooper told Oprah Winfrey he had dyslexia as a child.

Cooper played Dungeons & Dragons with his brother as a child. He later said that it gave him and his brother an escape from the grief of their father's death.

Cooper is gay; as of 2012, he was (according to The New York Times) "the most prominent openly gay journalist on American television". For years, Cooper avoided discussing his private life in interviews. On July 2, 2012, however, he gave Andrew Sullivan permission to publish an email that stated, in part:

I've begun to consider whether the unintended outcomes of maintaining my privacy outweigh personal and professional principle. It's become clear to me that by remaining silent on certain aspects of my personal life for so long, I have given some the mistaken impression that I am trying to hide something—something that makes me uncomfortable, ashamed or even afraid. This is distressing because it is simply not true. ... The fact is, I'm gay, always have been, always will be, and I couldn't be any more happy, comfortable with myself, and proud.

In 2014, Apple CEO Tim Cook sought Cooper's advice before making the decision to publicly come out as gay.

In 2014, Cooper and his long-term partner at the time, Benjamin Maisani, purchased Rye House, a historic estate in Connecticut. In March 2018, Cooper confirmed that he and Maisani had split up.

Cooper was friends with Anthony Bourdain, celebrity chef and host of the CNN series Parts Unknown. After Bourdain died by suicide on June 8, 2018, Cooper paid tribute to him in a CNN special program, Remembering Anthony Bourdain. Cooper also paid tribute to Bourdain on the Thanksgiving 2020 episode of Anderson Cooper Full Circle, saying that he was "proud to call Anthony Bourdain a friend", and adding: "He is so, so missed by so many."

In 2021, Cooper and co-author Katherine Howe published Vanderbilt: The Rise and Fall of an American Dynasty, a history of the Vanderbilt family going back to his Vanderbilt ancestors who came to New Amsterdam in the 17th century.

=== Children ===
On April 30, 2020, Cooper announced the birth of a son to a surrogate mother on April 27. "On Monday I became a father. I've never said that out loud and it astonishes me. I have a son," he said at the end of a CNN Town Hall on his show, Anderson Cooper 360°.

Though Cooper and Benjamin Maisani are no longer romantically involved, the pair co-parent the child and Maisani was present in the delivery room for the birth.

On February 10, 2022, Cooper announced at the beginning of his show on CNN that he had just become a father for a second time, to another son. Maisani is in the process of adopting Cooper's other son.

== Awards ==
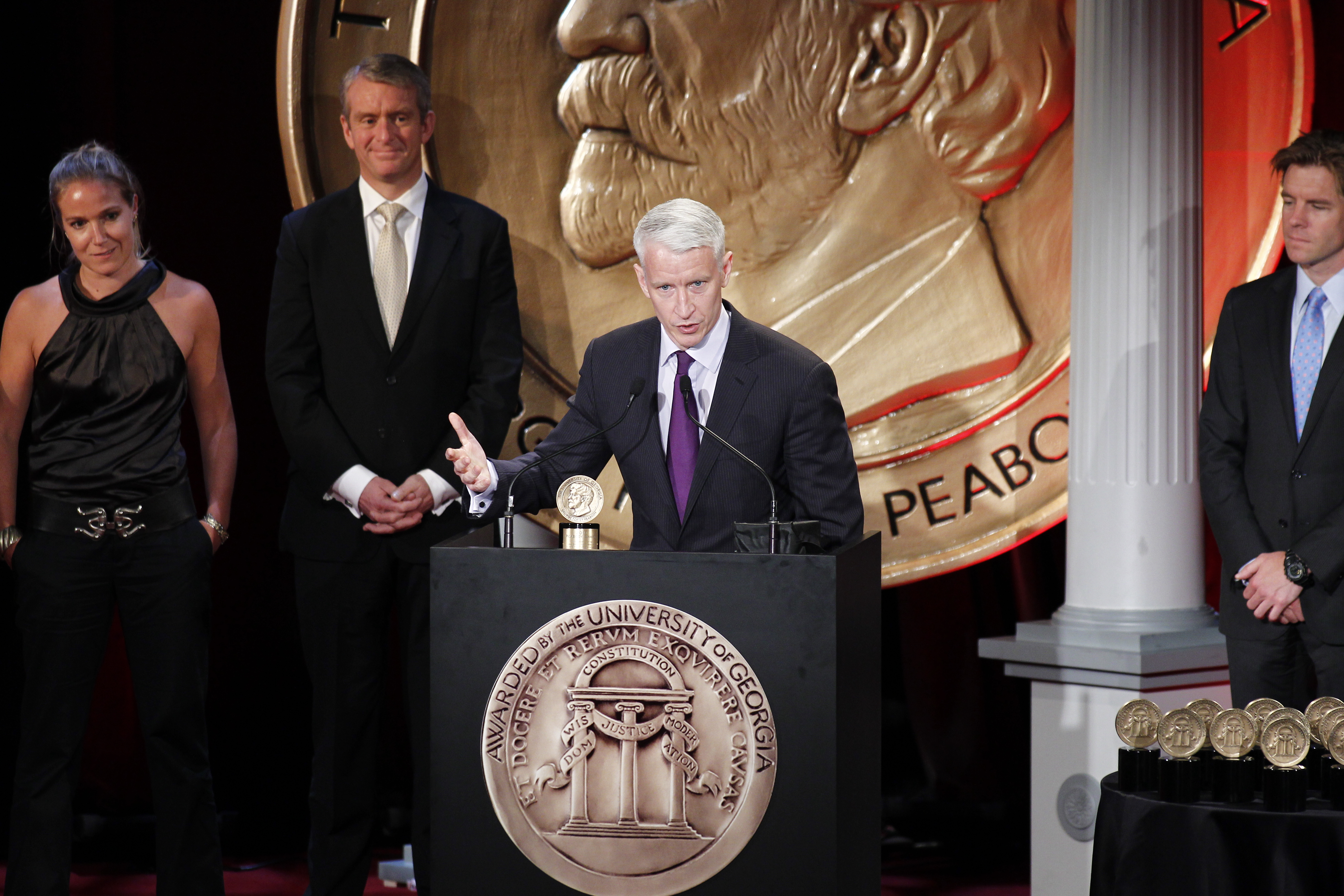
Cooper accepting a Peabody Award in 2012 for CNN's coverage of the Arab Spring

Cooper helped lead CNN's Peabody Award-winning coverage of Hurricane Katrina, and the network's Alfred I. duPont–Columbia University Award-winning coverage of the 2004 tsunami. He has won 18 Emmy Awards, including two for his coverage of the earthquake in Haiti, and an Edward R. Murrow Award.

Year	Award	Organization	Work	Category	Result
1993	Bronze Telly	Telly Awards	Coverage of famine in Somalia		Won
1997	Emmy Award	ATAS/NATAS	Coverage of Princess Diana's funeral		Won
2001	GLAAD Media Award	GLAAD	20/20 Downtown: "High School Hero" – report on high school athlete Corey Johnson.	Outstanding TV Journalism	Won
2005	Peabody Award	Henry W. Grady College of Journalism and Mass Communication at the University of Georgia	Coverage of Hurricane Katrina		Won
2005	National Headliner Award	Press Club of Atlantic City	Anderson Cooper 360: "Wave of Destruction" – 2004 Indian Ocean earthquake and tsunami coverage	Coverage of a Major News Event	Won
2006	Emmy Award	ATAS/NATAS	Anderson Cooper 360: "Charity Hospital"	Outstanding Feature Story in a Regularly Scheduled Newscast	Won
2006	Emmy Award	ATAS/NATAS	Anderson Cooper 360: "Starving in Plain Sight"	Outstanding Live Coverage of a Breaking News Story – Long Form	Won
2006	Emmy Award	ATAS/NATAS	Anderson Cooper 360: "The Children: Part One and Part Two"	Best Story in a Regularly Scheduled Newscast	Nominated
2006	Alfred I. duPont–Columbia University Award	Columbia University Graduate School of Journalism	CNN for Coverage of the Tsunami Disaster in South Asia		Won
2007	Emmy Award	ATAS/NATAS	Anderson Cooper 360: "Sago Mines"	Outstanding Live Coverage of a Breaking News Story – Long Form	Nominated
2007	Emmy Award	ATAS/NATAS	Anderson Cooper 360: "High Rise Crash"	Outstanding Individual Achievement in a Craft: Lighting Direction & Scenic Design	Nominated
2007	Emmy Award	ATAS/NATAS	Anderson Cooper 360: "Black Market Infertility"	Outstanding Coverage of a Current Business News Story in a Regularly Scheduled Newscast	Nominated
2007	National Headliner Awards	Press Club of Atlantic City	Anderson Cooper 360: "9/11 Anniversary – Afghanistan: The Unfinished War"	Broadcast Television Networks, Cable Networks And Syndicators	Won
2008	Emmy Award	ATAS/NATAS	Anderson Cooper 360: "Unapproved Drugs"	Outstanding Feature Story in a Regularly Scheduled Newscast	Nominated
2008	Emmy Award	ATAS/NATAS	Anderson Cooper 360: "Chicago Police Brutality"	Outstanding Investigative Journalism in a Regularly Scheduled Newscast	Nominated
2008	National Headliner Awards	Press Club of Atlantic City	Anderson Cooper 360: "Bhutto Assassination"	Broadcast Television Networks, Cable Networks And Syndicators	Won
2008	National Headliner Awards	Press Club of Atlantic City	Anderson Cooper 360: "Michael Ware 2007 Coverage of Iraq"	Continuing Coverage of a Major News Event	Won
2008	National Headliner Awards	Press Club of Atlantic City	Anderson Cooper 360: "Keeping Them Honest: Transparent Congress?"	Investigative Reporting	Won
2008	GLAAD Media Awards	GLAAD	Anderson Cooper 360: "The First Casualty"	TV Journalism – News Segment	Won
2009	Emmy Award	ATAS/NATAS	60 Minutes: "War against Women"	Outstanding Continuing Coverage of a News Story in a News Magazine	Won
2009	Emmy Award	ATAS/NATAS	CNN's Coverage of the Democratic National Convention	Outstanding Live Coverage of a Breaking News Story – Long Form	Nominated
2009	Emmy Award	ATAS/NATAS	CNN's Coverage of Election Night 2008	Outstanding Live Coverage of a Breaking News Story – Long Form	Nominated
2010	National Order of Honour and Merit	Government of Haiti	Reporting on 2010 Haiti earthquake		Awarded
2010	National Headliner Awards	Press Club of Atlantic City	Anderson Cooper 360: "Inside the Battle Zone: Afghanistan"	Continuing Coverage of a Major News Event	Won
2011	Emmy Award	ATAS/NATAS	Anderson Cooper 360: "Haiti in Ruins"	Outstanding Coverage of a Breaking News Story in a Regularly Scheduled Newscast	Won
2011	Emmy Award	ATAS/NATAS	Anderson Cooper 360: "Crisis in Haiti"	Outstanding Live Coverage of a Current News Story – Long Form	Won
2011	National Headliner Awards	Press Club of Atlantic City	"Taliban"	Documentary or Series of Reports on the Same Subject	Won
2011	National Headliner Awards	Press Club of Atlantic City	Anderson Cooper 360: "Black or White: Kids on Race"	Investigative Reporting	Won
2011	National Headliner Awards	Press Club of Atlantic City	Anderson Cooper 360: "Amazing Animals: Smarter Than You Think"	Environmental Reporting	Won
2011	Overseas Press Club Awards	Overseas Press Club	"Taliban"	Edward R. Murrow Award	Won
2011	Overseas Press Club Awards	Overseas Press Club	Anderson Cooper 360: "Haiti Earthquake"	David Kaplan Award	Won
2011	GLAAD Media Awards	GLAAD	Anderson Cooper 360: "Gay Teen Suicides"	Outstanding TV Journalism – Newsmagazine	Won
2012	Peabody Award	Henry W. Grady College of Journalism and Mass Communication	CNN's Reporting on the Arab Spring		Won
2012	Emmy Award	ATAS/NATAS	Anderson Cooper 360: "Bullying: It Stops Here"	Outstanding News Discussion & Analysis	Won
2012	Emmy Award	ATAS/NATAS	Anderson Cooper 360: "Unrest Escalates in Egypt"	Outstanding Live Coverage of a Current News Story – Long Form	Nominated
2012	Emmy Award	ATAS/NATAS	CNN/CNNi Breaking News Simulcast: "Revolution in Egypt: President Mubarak Steps Down"	Outstanding Live Coverage of a Current News Story – Long Form	Won
2012	National Headliner Awards	Press Club of Atlantic City	Anderson Cooper 360: "Egypt Uprising"	Coverage of a major news event	Won
2012	GLAAD Media Award	GLAAD	Anderson Cooper 360: "The 'Sissy Boy' Experiments"	Outstanding TV Journalism – News Magazine	Won
2012	Lew Klein Awards	Temple University Klein College of Media and Communication		Excellence Honoree	Awarded
2013	Emmy Award	ATAS/NATAS	60 Minutes: "Three Generations of Punishment"	Outstanding Continuing Coverage of a News Story in a News Magazine	Nominated
2013	Emmy Award	ATAS/NATAS	Anderson Cooper 360: "Kids on Race: The Hidden Picture"	Outstanding News Discussion and Analysis	Won
2013	Emmy Award	ATAS/NATAS	CNN: "Election Night in America"	Outstanding Live Coverage of a Current News Story – Long Form	Won
2013	Emmy Award	ATAS/NATAS	CNN: "Israel/Gaza Conflict"	Outstanding Live Coverage of a Current News Story – Long Form	Nominated
2013	GLAAD Media Award	GLAAD		Vito Russo Award	Awarded
2014	Emmy Award	ATAS/NATAS	Anderson Cooper 360: "Boston Bombing Victim Vows to Dance Again"	Outstanding Continuing Coverage of a News Story in a Regularly Scheduled Newscast	Nominated
2014	Emmy Award	ATAS/NATAS	Anderson Cooper 360: "Guns Under Fire: An AC360 Town Hall"	Outstanding News Discussion and Analysis	Nominated
2014	Emmy Award	ATAS/NATAS	CNN Newsroom: "CNN's Coverage of Typhoon Haiyan"	Outstanding Live Coverage of a Current News Story – Long-Form	Nominated
2014	Emmy Award	ATAS/NATAS	60 Minutes: "Cosmic Roulette"	Outstanding Writing	Nominated
2015	Emmy Award	ATAS/NATAS	Anderson Cooper 360: "NYC Chokehold Death Protests"	Outstanding Live Coverage of a Current News Story-Long-Form	Nominated
2016	Emmy Award	ATAS/NATAS	Anderson Cooper 360: "Europe's Refugee Crisis"	Outstanding Coverage of a Breaking News Story in a Regularly Scheduled Newscast	Won
2016	Emmy Award	ATAS/NATAS	60 Minutes: "Lumber Liquidators"	Outstanding Investigative Journalism in a News Magazine	Nominated
2016	Emmy Award	ATAS/NATAS	Anderson Cooper 360: "#BeingThirteen: Inside the Secret World of Teens"	Outstanding News Discussion and Analysis	Won
2016	Emmy Award	ATAS/NATAS	Anderson Cooper 360: "Police Under Fire"	Outstanding News Discussion and Analysis	Nominated
2016	Emmy Award	ATAS/NATAS	CNN Special Report: "CNN Debates Coverage"	Outstanding Live Coverage of a Current News Story – Long Form	Nominated
2016	Yale Undergraduate Lifetime Achievement Award	Yale College Council			Awarded
2017	Emmy Award	ATAS/NATAS	60 Minutes: "The Music of Zomba Prison"	Outstanding Feature Story in a Newsmagazine	Won
2017	Emmy Award	ATAS/NATAS	60 Minutes: "The Brothers Rosenberg"	Outstanding Feature Story in a Newsmagazine	Nominated
2017	Emmy Award	ATAS/NATAS	Anderson Cooper 360: "Pulse Nightclub Massacre"	Outstanding Breaking News Coverage	Nominated
2017	Emmy Award	ATAS/NATAS	CNN: "Battle for Mosul"	Outstanding Breaking News Coverage	Nominated
2017	Emmy Award	ATAS/NATAS	Anderson Cooper 360: "Trump Accusers Speak Out with Anderson Cooper"	Outstanding Live Interview	Nominated
2017	Emmy Award	ATAS/NATAS	CNN Newsroom: "Pam Bondi Interview with Anderson Cooper"	Outstanding Live Interview	Nominated
2017	Emmy Award	ATAS/NATAS	60 Minutes: "Little Jazz Man"	Outstanding Arts, Culture and Entertainment Report	Won
2017	Emmy Award	ATAS/NATAS	Anderson Cooper 360: "Trump University Fraud"	Outstanding Business, Consumer and Economic Report	Won
2017	Emmy Award	ATAS/NATAS	60 Minutes: "The Music of Zomba Prison"	Outstanding Writing	Nominated
2018	Emmy Award	ATAS/NATAS	CNN Worldwide Hurricane Coverage	Outstanding Breaking News Coverage	Nominated
2018	Emmy Award	ATAS/NATAS	Manchester Concert Attack	Outstanding Breaking News Coverage	Nominated
2018	Emmy Award	ATAS/NATAS	Anderson Cooper 360: "NFL Town Hall: Patriotism, The Players and The President"	Outstanding News Discussion & Analysis	Nominated
2018	Emmy Award	ATAS/NATAS	Anderson Cooper 360: "Anderson Cooper Interviews Janet Porter"	Outstanding Live Interview	Nominated
2018	Emmy Award	ATAS/NATAS	Anderson Cooper 360: "Faces of Grief: Sutherland Springs Pastor & Heather Melton"	Outstanding Live Interview	Won
2018	Emmy Award	ATAS/NATAS	Anderson Cooper 360: "Sally Yates and Anderson Cooper"	Outstanding Edited Interview	Nominated
2018	Emmy Award	ATAS/NATAS	60 Minutes: "The Forger"	Outstanding Arts, Culture and Entertainment Report	Nominated
2018	Emmy Award	ATAS/NATAS	60 Minutes: "Brain Hacking"	Outstanding Business, Consumer and Economic Report	Nominated
2018	GLAAD Media Award	GLAAD	Anderson Cooper 360: "The Pulse of Orlando: Terror at the Nightclub"	Outstanding Journalism Newsmagazine	Won
2018	Walter Cronkite Award for Excellence in Journalism	Arizona State University's Walter Cronkite School of Journalism and Mass Communication			Awarded
2019	Emmy Award	ATAS/NATAS	Anderson Cooper 360: "Undercover with Nigeria's Pushermen"	Outstanding Investigative Report in a Newscast	Nominated
2019	Emmy Award	ATAS/NATAS	CNN Heroes: An All-Star Tribute	Outstanding News Special	Nominated
2019	Emmy Award	ATAS/NATAS	Anderson Cooper 360: "Finding Hope: Battling America's Suicide Crisis"	Outstanding News Discussion & Analysis	Won
2019	Emmy Award	ATAS/NATAS	60 Minutes: "Stormy Daniels"	Outstanding Edited Interview	Nominated
2019	Emmy Award	ATAS/NATAS	60 Minutes: "Into the Wild"	Outstanding Arts, Culture or Entertainment Report	Nominated
2019	Emmy Award	ATAS/NATAS	Anderson Cooper 360: "The Parkland Diaries"	Best Story in a Newscast	Nominated
2020	Emmy Award	ATAS/NATAS	A Deadly Weekend in America	Outstanding Breaking News Coverage	Nominated
2020	Emmy Award	ATAS/NATAS	Anderson Cooper 360: "Anderson Cooper Interviews Facebook's Monika Bickert"	Outstanding Live Interview	Nominated
2020	Emmy Award	ATAS/NATAS	60 Minutes: "Mark Bradford"	Outstanding Arts, Culture or Entertainment Report	Won
2020	Emmy Award	ATAS/NATAS	Anderson Cooper 360: "Anderson Cooper Pays Tribute to his Mom, Gloria Vanderbilt"	Outstanding Writing	Nominated
2023	Poynter Medal for Lifetime Achievement in Journalism	Poynter Institute			Awarded
2023	Webby Award for Best Series (Podcast)	Webby Awards	"All There Is" Podcast	Best Series (Podcast)	Won (People's Voice)
2023	Webby Award for Best Host (Podcast)	Webby Awards	"All There Is" Podcast	Best Host (Podcast)	Honored
2024	Ambie Award for Best Podcast Host	The Podcast Academy	"All There Is" podcast	Best Podcast Host	Nominated

=== Other awards ===
- Silver Plaque from the Chicago International Film Festival for his report from Sarajevo on the Bosnian War
- Bronze Award from the National Education Film and Video Festival for a report on political Islam

== Career timeline ==
- 1999–2000: World News Now co-anchor
- 2001–2002: The Mole host
- 2002–present: New Year's Eve Live co-anchor on CNN and CNN International
- 2003–present: Anderson Cooper 360° anchor
- 2005: NewsNight co-anchor
- 2007–2026: 60 Minutes correspondent
- 2011–2013: Anderson Live
- 2021: Jeopardy! guest host

== Filmography ==
- Chappie (2015)
- The 33 (2015)
- Batman v Superman: Dawn of Justice (2016)
- Black Panther: Wakanda Forever (2022)

== Books ==
- Dispatches from the Edge: A Memoir of War, Disasters, and Survival (Harper Perennial, 2006). ISBN 978-0061451515.
- The Rainbow Comes and Goes (Harper Perennial, 2016). ISBN 978-0062454942.
- Vanderbilt: The Rise and Fall of an American Dynasty. Hardcover – September 21, 2021 ISBN 0062964615
- Astor: The Rise and Fall of an American Fortune. Harper – September 19, 2023 ISBN 978-0062964700

== See also ==
- LGBT culture in New York City
- List of LGBT people from New York City
- New Yorkers in journalism
