= Karen Kopins =

American actress, model (born 1958)

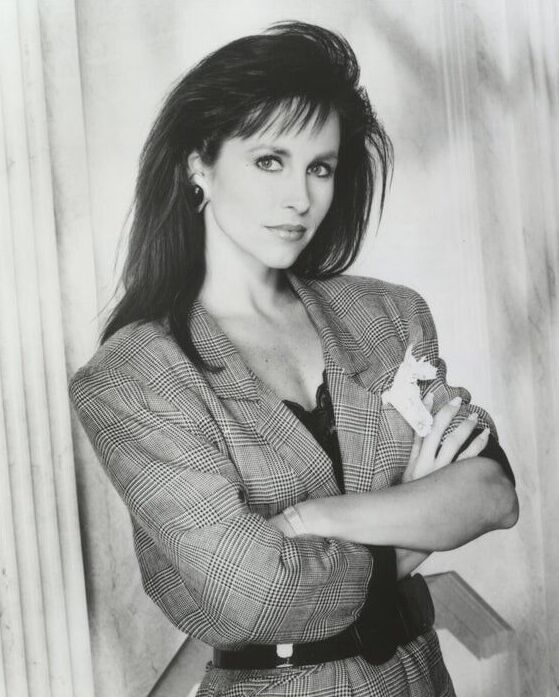
- Kopins in 1988
- Born: October 10, 1961 (age 64)
- Education: Marymount College
- Occupations: Actress, model
- Years active: 1977–94
- Spouse: Mark Shaw (m. 1990)
- Children: 4

Karen Kopins Shaw (born October 10, 1961) is an American beauty pageant winner, former actress and former model.

== Early life ==
Kopins was born on October 10, 1961. Kopins attended Ridgefield High School and graduated from Marymount College before moving to California to pursue an acting career.

She was Miss Connecticut 1977, having entered the pageant as Miss Ridgefield.

== Career ==
Kopins starred in films Fast Forward, Creator, Once Bitten, opposite Jim Carrey, and Jake Speed, and appeared in guest roles in various television shows, such as The A-Team and Riptide. She was cast as one of Charlie's Angels in the unaired spinoff Angels '88. Kopins had a small role in an episode of Amazing Stories, one of two directed by series creator Steven Spielberg. Other than one-off guest appearances, her only recurring role on a series was during seasons 11 and 13 of Dallas, playing Kay Lloyd, a love interest of Bobby Ewing. She also played Eugenia Weeks, a lesbian former beauty queen who befriends Suzanne on an episode of Designing Women.

== Personal life ==
In 1990, Kopins married her high school sweetheart, property developer Marc Shaw, with whom she has four children. The family lived in Litchfield, Connecticut's Rye House, which is listed on the National Register of Historic Places, from 2000 to 2012.

== Filmography ==
=== Film ===
Year	Title	Role
1985	Fast Forward	Susan Granger
1985	Creator	Lucy Wolper
1985	Once Bitten	Robin Pierce
1986	Jake Speed	Margaret Winston
1988	The Tracker	Sarah Bolton
1989	Troop Beverly Hills	Lisa
1994	Lady in Waiting	Fiona Richards

=== Television ===
Year	Title	Role	Notes
1983	The Fall Guy	Government Agent	Episode: "Baker's Dozen"
1984	Riptide	Kimba Hall	Episode: "Pilot"
1984	T.J. Hooker	Officer Maggie Paine	Episode: "Target: Hooker"
1984	Knight Rider	Cindy Morgan	Episode: "Dead of Knight"
1985	The Love Boat	Misty Lawson	Episode: "Getting Started/Daughter's Dilemma/The Captain Wears Pantyhose"
1985	HeartBeat	Erin	TV movie
1985	Amazing Stories	Liz	Episode: "The Mission"
1986	Scarecrow and Mrs. King	Sonja Chenko	Episodes: "Stemwinder: Part 1" and "Stemwinder: Part 2"
1986	The A-Team	Dominique Conré	Episode: "The Spy Who Mugged Me"
1988	Full House	Linda Stratton	Episode: "Danny's Very First Date"
1988	Circus	Jennifer	TV Movie, unsold pilot
1988–1989	Dallas	Kay Lloyd	Recurring role (seasons 11, 13)
1989	Perry Mason: The Case of the Lethal Lesson	Kimberly McDonald	TV movie
1989	Midnight Caller	Kathy Heller	Episode: "Blood Red"
1990	Designing Women	Eugenia Weeks	Episode: "Suzanne Goes Looking for a Friend"
1991	Archie: To Riverdale and Back Again	Veronica Lodge	TV movie
1994	The Cosby Mysteries	Lauren Murdoch	Episode: "The Fine Art of Murder"

Preceded by Debra LaRoche	Miss Connecticut; 1977	Succeeded by Maryalice Flineroy
