= Night of the Comet =

1984 film by Thom Eberhardt

- Theatrical release poster
- Directed by: Thom Eberhardt
- Written by: Thom Eberhardt
- Produced by: Andrew Lane; Wayne Crawford
- Starring: Robert Beltran; Catherine Mary Stewart; Kelli Maroney; Sharon Farrell; Mary Woronov; Geoffrey Lewis
- Cinematography: Arthur Albert
- Edited by: Fred Stafford
- Music by: David Richard Campbell
- Production companies: Thomas Coleman and Michael Rosenblatt Productions; Film Development Fund
- Distributed by: Atlantic Releasing Corporation
- Release date: November 16, 1984
- Running time: 95 minutes
- Country: United States
- Language: English
- Budget: $700,000
- Box office: $14.4 million (US)

Night of the Comet is a 1984 American science fiction comedy horror film written and directed by Thom Eberhardt. It stars Catherine Mary Stewart, Robert Beltran, and Kelli Maroney as survivors of a comet that has turned most people into either dust or zombies. Night of the Comet grossed $14.4 million in the US on a $700,000 budget. It received positive reviews according to Rotten Tomatoes and has since become a cult film, influencing the creation of the titular Buffy the Vampire Slayer character Buffy Summers.

== Plot ==
The Earth is passing through the tail of a comet, an event which has not occurred in 65 million years and coincided with the extinction event that wiped out the dinosaurs. On the night of the comet's passage, eleven days before Christmas, large crowds gather outside to watch and celebrate.

Eighteen-year-old Regina "Reggie" Belmont works at a movie theater in Los Angeles. She is annoyed to find someone with the initials DMK has the sixth highest score on the theater's Tempest video game; the other high scores are hers. Staying after the theater closes, she helps her boyfriend, projectionist Larry Dupree, sneak back in so he can loan out a film reel for illegal duplication. Reggie and Larry spend the night in the steel-lined projection booth and have sex.

Meanwhile, Reggie's 16-year-old sister Samantha ("Sam") argues with their stepmother Doris, who Sam knows is cheating on her father, who is away on military duty. After a physical altercation, Sam spends the night in a steel backyard shed.

The next morning, a reddish haze covers the sky; there are no signs of life but piles of red dust and heaps of clothing everywhere. Unaware that anything has occurred, Larry goes outside and is killed by a zombie. After trying to beat DMK's high score, Reggie looks for Larry, mistaking the red sky as bad smog. She quickly encounters the zombie, but escapes on Larry's motorcycle. At home, she finds her sister. The two surmise that because they both spent the night in steel containers, they were saved from the comet's effects.

The sisters race to the local radio station after they hear a disc jockey on air, only to find it was a pre-recorded show. They come across another survivor there, Hector Gomez, who spent the night in the back of his steel truck. When Sam talks into the microphone, she is heard by researchers in an underground installation out in the desert. As they listen to Reggie, Sam and Hector debate what to do, the scientists note that the zombies, though less exposed to the comet, will eventually disintegrate into dust themselves. Hector leaves to check if any of his family survived, but promises to return.

Reggie and Sam go shopping for guns and clothing at a mall. After a firefight with some zombie stock boys and their leader, Willy, the girls are taken prisoner, but are saved by a rescue team sent by the scientists. Reggie is taken back to their base. Audrey White, a disillusioned scientist, offers to dispose of Sam, whom she diagnosed as having been exposed to the comet due to her developing rash (in fact an outbreak of hives), and to wait for Hector. After she fakes euthanizing Sam by injecting her with a sedative, she kills the other remaining scientist. When Hector returns, Audrey briefs him, then gives herself a lethal injection (as she herself has been exposed). Sam and Hector set out to rescue Reggie.

Back at the base, it is revealed that the researchers had suspected and prepared for the comet's effects, but inadvertently left the ventilation system open and the fans running. The deadly dust permeated their base. Reggie, who has become suspicious, escapes and discovers that the dying scientists have hunted down and rendered healthy survivors brain-dead. They harvest their untainted blood to keep the disease at bay while they desperately search for a cure. Reggie saves a young boy and a girl before they are processed, then unplugs the other victims from their life support machines. Sam and Hector rescue the trio and blow up the scientists.

Eventually, rain washes away the dust. Reggie pairs up with Hector, and they assume parental roles with the children. Sam feels left out. Frustrated, she ignores Reggie's warning about crossing the street against the signal light, claiming there is nobody else left. Sam is almost run over by a sports car driven by Danny Mason Keener, another teenage survivor. After apologizing, he invites her to go for a ride. As they drive off, the car is shown sporting the initials "DMK" on the vanity plate.

== Cast ==
- Robert Beltran as Hector Gomez
- Catherine Mary Stewart as Regina "Reggie" Belmont
- Kelli Maroney as Samantha "Sam" Belmont
- Sharon Farrell as Doris, Reggie and Sam's stepmother
- Mary Woronov as Audrey White
- Geoffrey Lewis as Dr. Carter, the leader of the think tank
- Michael Bowen as Larry Dupree
- Peter Fox as Dr. Wilson, one of the researchers
- John Achorn as Oscar Silverman
- Lissa Layng as Davenport
- Devon Ericson as Minder
- Ivan E. Roth as Willy
- Chance Boyer as Brian, the young rescued boy
- Janice Kawaye as Sarah, the young rescued girl
- Stanley Brock as Mel, the movie theater manager
- Marc Poppel as Danny Mason Keener / DMK
- Dick Rude and Chris Pedersen as stockboys

== Production ==
When writing the script, director Thom Eberhardt wanted to merge the idea of strong female protagonists with his love of post-apocalyptic films set in empty cities. For the women, he was inspired by Ginger Rogers. Further inspiration came from real-life teenage girls whom he met while filming PBS specials. Without telling the girls details about the script's premise, he asked them to describe how they would react to an apocalyptic event. The girls saw the scenario as an exciting adventure and only saw a downside to the experience when Eberhardt brought up the subject of dating, as most of the girls assumed the majority of boys be dead. Using their answers, Eberhardt wrote the script to be lighthearted and adventuresome. Eberhardt initially had trouble convincing the studio to let him direct it, but they relented when he held out, as Atlantic Releasing Corporation was looking to immediately invest $700,000. Atlantic also wanted to capitalize on the success of their 1983 hit Valley Girl and the popularity of quirky drive-in films like Repo Man. The producers, Andrew Lane and Wayne Crawford, clashed with Eberhardt during filming; Eberhardt would later say that they did not understand the film and resented being assigned to such a low-budget B movie. Early in the production, they attempted to have him replaced. Regardless, Eberhardt praised their producing skill and said the film could not have been made without their help. Heather Langenkamp auditioned for the role of Samantha "Sam" Belmont and was the number one choice on the casting list but the part ultimately went to Kelli Maroney.

== Release ==
Atlantic released Night of the Comet in the US on November 16, 1984, earning $3,580,578 in its opening weekend, coming in at third place. It stayed in theaters for six weeks and grossed $14,418,922 total in the US against a $700,000 budget. The film is also noted as one of the first mainstream films to carry the MPAA PG-13 rating.

=== Critical response ===
On the review aggregator website Rotten Tomatoes, 79% of 33 critics' reviews are positive, with an average rating of 6.5/10. The website's consensus reads: "Valley Girl culture satire Night of the Comet gets lots of mileage out of its slapstick sci-fi zombie approach." On Metacritic, it has a score of 59 out of 100 based on 10 critic reviews, which indicates "mixed or average" reviews.

Variety wrote that Eberhardt "creates a visually arresting B-picture in the neon-primary colors of the cult hit Liquid Sky", as well as pointing out similarities with Five, The Day of the Triffids, The Omega Man, Dawn of the Dead and Last Woman on Earth. They described the film as "a successful pastiche of numerous science fiction films, executed with an entertaining, tongue-in-cheek flair that compensates for its absence in originality." Vincent Canby of The New York Times called it "a good-natured, end-of-the-world B-movie" whose "humor augments rather than upstages the mechanics of the melodrama". Neil Gaiman reviewed Night of the Comet for Imagine magazine, and stated that "one of the most amusing, witty, imaginative, and thought-provoking films I've seen that was made with no budget and is also cheap exploitation".

=== Home media ===
Night of the Comet was released on VHS, Betamax videocassettes and CED Videodisc on August 30, 1985, and distributed by CBS/FOX Video. A second US VHS printing, distributed by Goodtimes Video, was released on August 30, 1990. MGM released the film on DVD in the US on March 6, 2007. The film was released in a Collector's Edition on Blu-ray by Shout! Factory on November 19, 2013. Sherilyn Connelly of The Village Voice criticized the synopsis on the back of the disc packaging, saying that it dumbed down the film and portrayed the independent women as helpless stereotypes. The film was released on Ultra HD Blu-ray in September 2023.

== Soundtrack ==
A soundtrack for the film was released by Macola Records. The soundtrack's "Learn to Love Again", a love duet performed by Amy Holland and Chris Farren, plays during a scene between Regina and Hector and in the closing credits. Other songs include "The Whole World is Celebratin'" (also performed by Chris Farren), "Lady in Love" and "Unbelievable" by Revolver, "Strong Heart" by John Townsend, "Trouble" by Skip Adams, "Living on the Edge" by Jocko Marcellino, "Virgin in Love" by Thom Pace, "Never Give Up" by Bobby Caldwell and "Hard Act to Follow" by Diana DeWitt.

== Legacy ==
Night of the Comet developed a cult following in the years after its release. Keith Phipps of The Dissolve wrote that the film's cult following comes from how matter-of-factly it treats its weird premise. The film was voted number 10 in Bloody Disgusting's Top 10 Doomsday Horror Films in 2009. Maroney's character was an influence on Joss Whedon when he created Buffy Summers of Buffy the Vampire Slayer.

=== Remake ===
In October 2018, Orion Pictures hired Roxanne Benjamin to write a sci-fi-horror remake of Night of the Comet. As of April 2019, Benjamin confirmed she had submitted her script for the remake to Orion. In January 2023 Benjamin stated that the remake was still alive, but was slowly going through the process at Orion.
