= Jake Speed =

- Theatrical release poster
- Directed by: Andrew Lane
- Written by: Wayne Crawford; Andrew Lane
- Produced by: Wayne Crawford; Andrew Lane; William Fay
- Starring: Wayne Crawford; Dennis Christopher; Karen Kopins; John Hurt
- Cinematography: Bryan Loftus
- Edited by: Michael Ripps; Fred Stafford
- Music by: Mark Snow
- Production companies: New World Pictures; Force Ten Productions; Balcor Film Investors
- Distributed by: New World Pictures
- Release date: May 30, 1986
- Running time: 100 minutes
- Country: United States
- Language: English
- Budget: $5 million
- Box office: $1,943,751

Jake Speed is a 1986 American action adventure comedy film directed and produced by Andrew Lane, with Wayne Crawford, and William Fay. It was written by Lane and Crawford, and starred Crawford in the title role, alongside Dennis Christopher, Karen Kopins and John Hurt.

In the film, a pulp fiction-styled adventurer is tasked with rescuing a kidnapped girl. He has to face a white slavery ring during its host country's civil war.

== Plot ==
In Paris, a girl named Maureen Winston (Becca C. Ashley) is abducted by two evil-looking men. While her family prays for her safe return, Maureen's father heaps guilt on her sister Margaret (Karen Kopins), since she convinced her to go see the world. However, Margaret's grandfather (Leon Ames) has an idea: call for Jake Speed (Wayne Crawford) to go and rescue her. One problem exists: Jake Speed is a character in a series of men's adventure paperback novels in the vein of Mack Bolan and Remo Williams (Doc Savage is also name-checked, but he is said to have been out of the game for years).

However, Jake Speed does exist, as Margaret finds out, when he leaves a note for her to meet him and his sidekick, Desmond Floyd (Dennis Christopher), in a tough Paris bar. The novels, as Margaret finds out, are based on Jake and Des's real-life adventures, and they work for nothing, seeing action and excitement (and another novel) as their reward.

Jake reveals that Maureen was kidnapped by white slavers, and is being held in an African country. Jake, Des, and Margaret fly to the nation, which is in the middle of a civil war, to rescue her. Many twists and turns later, Jake's archenemy, the evil, perverted, murderous Englishman Sid (John Hurt), is revealed to be behind the ring, and soon, Margaret becomes a part of it. Jake and Des must now rescue both Maureen and Margaret, stop Sid, and help the girls get out in one piece, while dealing with warring factions, pits of lions, and machine gun-firing helicopters.

== Cast ==
- Wayne Crawford as Jake Speed
- Dennis Christopher as Desmond Floyd
- Karen Kopins as Margaret Winston
- John Hurt as Sid
- Leon Ames as Pop Winston
- Roy London as Maurice
- Donna Pescow as Wendy
- Barry Primus as Lawrence
- Monte Markham as Mr. Winston
- Millie Perkins as Mrs. Winston
- Ian Yule as Bill Smith
- Peter Fox as Priest

== Production ==
Filming took place in Sherman Oaks, California; Paris, France; and in Zimbabwe. The film was produced by New World Pictures in association with Balcor Film Investors and Force Ten Productions. It was Force Ten's first production since 1978's Paradise Alley.

Wayne Crawford stated that he had himself in mind for the title role when he wrote the script.

== Soundtrack ==
A soundtrack of composer Mark Snow's music was released on LP record only by Varèse Sarabande in 1986. It was reissued on compact disc by Buysoundtrax in 2009 in a limited edition pressing of 1000 copies.

A track listing is as follows:

1. Main Title
2. Friendly Skies
3. Big Finish
4. Explosive Situation - Café Girls
5. Singles' Bar
6. Play-A-Lick
7. Dangerous Streets
8. Lion Around
9. Maggie Leaves
10. Sid's Demise
11. Tender Time
12. H.A.R.V. - Sid's Resurrection
13. Voice Over
14. End Title

== Novelization ==
A novelization, written under the pseudonym Reno Melon, Jake and Des' pen name, was published on June 1, 1986, by Gold Eagle/Harlequin (ISBN 0-373-62102-7).

== Critical response ==
Alex Stewart reviewed Jake Speed for White Dwarf #83, and stated that "Until John Hurt turns up, having fun being a sleazy villain, the cast hang about, wondering what to say to each other. The result is surely the dullest and least speedy caper movie ever."

The film holds a 48% rating on Rotten Tomatoes.
