= God's Bloody Acre =

1975 film by Harry E. Kerwin

- Directed by: Harry E. Kerwin
- Written by: Wayne Crawford; Harry E. Kerwin
- Produced by: Andrew Lane; Wayne Crawford
- Starring: Wayne Crawford; Jennifer Gregory
- Cinematography: William J. Walsh
- Edited by: Fredic Berney
- Music by: Michael Shaw
- Production companies: American General Pictures; Jaco Productions
- Distributed by: Omni Pictures Corporation
- Release date: October 6, 1975
- Running time: 87 minutes
- Country: United States
- Language: English
- Budget: $22,500
- Box office: $100,000

God's Bloody Acre is a 1975 American independent horror-thriller film directed by Harry E. Kerwin, who cowrote the film's screenplay with lead actor and producer Wayne Crawford.

The exploitation film follows three hillbilly brothers who engage in violence against a construction crew encroaching on the undeveloped forest they live in to develop a national forest and campground, and a group of unsuspecting travelers caught in the middle of the conflict.

== Cast ==
- Wayne Crawford (credited as Scott Lawrence) as David
- Jennifer Stock (credited as Jennifer Gregory) as Leslie
- Sam Moore as Benny
- Daniel Schweitzer as Ezra
- William Kerwin (credited as Thomas Wood) as Monroe
- Suzan Thomas (credited as Kayelynne) as Carol Rizzo
- Robert Rosano as Robert Rizzo

== Production ==
Filming took place on location around the Miami-area in Florida in 1972. The film marked the first collaboration between Wayne Crawford and producer Andrew Lane, who produced later films such as Valley Girl.

The film was produced on a budget of $22,500.
