= The Secretary (1995 film) =

1995 American film by Andrew Lane

- Genre: Thriller
- Written by: Graham Flashner
- Directed by: Andrew Lane
- Starring: Mel Harris; Sheila Kelley; Barry Bostwick; James Russo
- Music by: Louis Febre
- Country of origin: United States
- Original language: English

Production
- Producers: Pierre David; Clark Peterson
- Cinematography: Steven Bernstein
- Editor: Julian Semilian
- Running time: 94 minutes
- Production company: Agenda Productions

Original release
- Network: CBS
- Release: September 12, 1995

The Secretary is a 1995 American made-for-television thriller film directed by Andrew Lane with a script by Graham Flashner, featuring Mel Harris, Sheila Kelley and Barry Bostwick. The soundtrack was provided by Louis Febre.
