= Andrew Lane (film producer) =

American film producer and director

Andrew Lane is an American film producer and director. Together with Wayne Crawford he co-produced the 1983 comedy Valley Girl starring Nicolas Cage in his first co-starring role. The two were responsible for producing several other films including Night of the Comet, Servants of Twilight, Mortal Passions, and Jake Speed.

== Filmography ==
Film

Year	Title	Director	Writer	Producer
1975	God's Bloody Acre	No	No	Yes
1977	Tomcats	No	Yes	Yes
1983	Valley Girl	No	Yes	Yes
1984	Night of the Comet	No	No	Yes
1986	Jake Speed	Yes	Yes	Yes
1989	Mortal Passions	Yes	No	Executive
1990	Peacemaker	No	No	Yes
1991	Lonely Hearts	Yes	Yes	Yes
1991	Femme Fatale	No	No	Yes
1993	Distant Cousins	Yes	No	No
2005	South of Hell	No	Yes	Yes
2005	Bad Girls from Valley High	No	Yes	Co-producer
2008	Train Wreck	Yes	No	No

TV movies

Year	Title	Director	Producer
1995	The Secretary	Yes	No
1995	Trade-Off	Yes	Yes
