= June Chadwick =

English actress (born 1951)

- Born: June Elizabeth Chadwick; November 30, 1951 (age 74); Warwickshire, England, UK
- Education: Roedean School
- Occupation: Actress
- Years active: 1978–present
- Spouse: Toby Gerald Mayer

June Elizabeth Chadwick (born 30 November 1951, Warwickshire) is an English film and television actress. Her best-known television roles are as Lydia in the science fiction TV series V: The Series, and as Lt. Joanna Parisi on the third season of the series Riptide. She also played Pamela Drake in Murder, She Wrote series 6, episode 1: "Appointment in Athens".

Her best-known film credit is as Jeanine Pettibone in This Is Spinal Tap (1984) and its sequel, Spinal Tap II: The End Continues (2025).

== Filmography ==
=== Film ===
Year	Title	Role	Notes
1978	The Comeback	Nurse	aka The Day the Screaming Stopped or Encore
1979	Yesterday's Hero	Girl in Paris	
1979	The Golden Lady	Lucy	
1980	Silver Dream Racer	Secretary	
1982	Forbidden World	Dr. Barbara Glaser	Originally titled Mutant
1982	The Last Horror Film	First Reporter	Also released as Fanatic
1984	This Is Spinal Tap	Jeanine Pettibone	
1986	Jumpin' Jack Flash	Gillian	
1987	Distortions	Kelly Howell	
1988	Quiet Thunder	Karen Ashmore	Direct-to-Video film
1988	Headhunter	Denise Giulliani	
1989	Return of the Family Man	Camera Voice	
1989	Rising Storm	Mila Hart	
1989	The Evil Below	Sarah Livingstone	
1990	Back Stab	Mrs. Chambers	
1999	Diamonds	Roseanne Agensky	
2001	Facing the Enemy	Irene Spellman	
2025	Spinal Tap II: The End Continues	Jeanine Pettibone	

=== Television ===
Year	Title	Role	Notes
1983	Sparkling Cyanide	Sandra Farraday	Television film
1984	Magnum, P.I.	Lady Cynthia Warrington Stout, 'Cindy'	Season 4; episode 12: "The Case of the Red Faced Thespian"
1984	The Mating Call	Joan Sims	Television film
1984–1985	V	Lydia	Episodes 1, 2 & 4–18
1985	Magnum, P.I.	English Flight Attendant, Rick's Girlfriend	Season 5; episodes 1 & 2: "Echoes of the Mind: Parts 1 & 2"
1985	The A-Team	Carla Singer	Season 4; episodes 1 & 2: "Judgment Day: Parts 1 & 2"
1985–1986	Riptide	Lt. Joanna Parisi	Season 3; episodes 10–13 & 18–21
1986	MacGyver	Dr. Jill Melissa Ludlum	Season 2; episode 1: "The Human Factor"
1987	1st & Ten	Molly	Season 2; episode 8: "Easy Come, Easy Go"
1987	Scarecrow and Mrs. King	Elisa Danton	Season 4; episode 19: "All That Glitters"
1989	Matlock	Patricia Taylor	Season 3; episode 16: "The Thoroughbred"
1989	Murder, She Wrote	Pamela Drake	Season 6; episode 1: "Appointment in Athens"
1992–1993	Going to Extremes	Dr. Alice Davis	Episodes 1–17
1993	Civil Wars	Helen Gould	Season 2; episode 16: "Alien Aided Affection"
1993	Raven	Dr. Susan Stringer	Season 2; episode 8: "Something in the Closet"
1995	Fortune Hunter	Angel Sheriden	Episode 8: "The Cursed Dagger"
1995	Dazzle	Georgina Rosemont	Miniseries; television adaptation of Judith Krantz's novel
1995	One West Waikiki	Woman Counterfeiter	Season 2; episode 3: "Manpower"

=== Video games ===
Year	Title	Role	Notes
2001	Star Trek: Away Team	Dr. Sheila Thatcher (voice)	
