= Sometimes Aunt Martha Does Dreadful Things =

- Theatrical release poster
- Directed by: Thomas Casey
- Written by: Thomas Casey
- Produced by: Thomas Casey
- Starring: Abe Zwick; Wayne Crawford; Jessie Eastland; Robin Hughes; Don Craig
- Edited by: Jerry Siegel
- Production company: Paragon Films
- Release date: 1971
- Running time: 95 minutes
- Country: United States
- Language: English

Sometimes Aunt Martha Does Dreadful Things is a 1971 cult film written, produced, and directed by Thomas Casey.

== Plot ==
Set in Miami, and shot at the now closed Moberly Studios in Hollywood, Florida, the story centers around two criminals on the run: Stanley and Paul, who, because of their criminal history in Baltimore, have decided to lie low in a Miami suburb to avoid prosecution. They hatch a plan that involves Paul dressing in drag to pose as Stanley's "Aunt Martha."

Stanley is shown intimately in the company of several young women. Paul is concerned that Stanley's social lifestyle will lead to them getting noticed, and subsequently busted. Stanley seems to have no real direction in his life beyond women, and drugs. He becomes nasty and violent when he hangs out with Jerry, and Jerry's drugged out girlfriends. Aunt Martha has a bad habit of killing all of Stanley's girlfriends to keep them quiet.

== Cast ==
- Abe Zwick as Paul
- Wayne Crawford as Stanley (as Scott Lawrence)
- Jessie Eastland as Jerry (as Robert De Meo)
- Don Craig as Hubert
- Robin Hughes as Vicki
- Yanka Mann as Mrs. Adams
- Marty Cordova as Alma
- Maggie Wood as Dolores
- Mike Mingoia as Joe
- Sandra Lurie as Mary Lou
- Pat Finn-Lee as Neighbor (as Pat Erle)

== Reception ==
The TLA Video and DVD guide gave the film one star, stating that it is full of stereotypes, but is "good for a laugh." Raymond Murry stated that "Gay relationships don't come any sicker than in this enjoyably bizarre drive-in slasher-cum-camp pic."

Harry Long wrote in FlipSide that "the script lurches from one lunatic detail to another and the dialogue is jaw-droppingly asinine; the best that can be said for Casey's film is that he got enough coverage on a fly-by-night shooting schedule that it cuts together reasonably well."
