= The Evil Below =

1989 horror film by Wayne Crawford

- Region 2 DVD Release Cover
- Directed by: Wayne Crawford; Jean-Claude Dubois
- Written by: Arthur Payne
- Produced by: Barrie Saint Clair
- Starring: Wayne Crawford; June Chadwick; Ted Le Plat
- Cinematography: Keith Dunkley
- Music by: Julian Laxton
- Production companies: Gibraltar Entertainment; Legend Film Productions; Image Organization
- Distributed by: Raedon Home Video
- Release date: July 1989 (U.S. video)
- Running time: 98 minutes
- Country: South Africa
- Language: English

The Evil Below is a 1989 South African horror film directed and starred by Wayne Crawford and co-starring June Chadwick and Ted Le Plat. The film centers on Max Cash, an adventurer who goes hunting for treasure on a cursed shipwreck. It is one of many underwater-themed movies released around 1989, including The Abyss, Leviathan, DeepStar Six, Lords of the Deep, and The Rift (Endless Descent).

== Plot ==
Max Cash is a down-on-his luck fisherman and charter boat captain living in the Bahamas when his life takes a turn when he meets Sarah Livingstone, a tourist who is seeking to find the treasure of accursed shipwreck, 'The El Diablo' which has been rumored to have sunk on an offshore reef near one of the many islands. Max and Sarah then team up to locate the wreck while dodging Ray Calhoun, a local crime boss as well as Adrian Barlow, a mysterious businessman who claims that the wreck is guarded by supernatural forces in the form of a sea monster that no one claims to have ever seen and survived.

== Cast ==
- Wayne Crawford as Max Cash
- June Chadwick as Sarah Livingstone
- Sheri Able as Tracy
- Ted Le Plat as Adrian Barlow
- Graham Clarke as Ray Calhoun
- Liam Cundill as Ray Calhoun Junior
- Gordon Mulholland as Max Cash Senior
- Brian O'Shaughnessy as Father Shannon
- Peter Terry as Constable Chambers
- Paul Siebert as Guido

== Reception ==
Creature Feature gave the movie two out of five stars.
