= Kimberly Ray =

Kimberly Ray is an American film editor who has worked since the late 1980s on American feature films and television shows.

== Filmography ==
Year	Title	Position
1989	Mortal Passions	editor
1992	White Men Can't Jump	editor
1993	The Program (1993 film)	editor
1994	Major League II	editor
1994	Cobb (film)	editor
1995	The Good Old Boys (film)	editor
1996	Tin Cup	editor
1996	A Loss of Innocence	editor
1997	The Last Don (miniseries)	editor, 3 episodes
1997-1998	Buffy the Vampire Slayer	editor, 8 episodes
2000	Steal This Movie!	editor
2000	Deadlocked	editor
2000	Dude, Where's My Car?	editor
2002	Big Fat Liar	editor
2003	The Extreme Team	editor
2004	Uncovered: The War on Iraq	editor
2005	Love Wrecked	editor
2007	Lincoln Heights (TV series)	editor, 1 episode
2005-2009	House (TV series)	editor, 20 episodes
2009	White Collar (TV series)	editor, 3 episodes
2010	Terriers (TV series)	editor, 3 episodes
