= Mortal Passions =

- Theatrical release poster
- Directed by: Andrew Lane
- Written by: Alan Moskowitz
- Produced by: Gwen Field
- Starring: Zach Galligan; Michael Bowen; Krista Errickson; Luca Bercovici; Sheila Kelley; David Warner
- Cinematography: Christian Sebaldt
- Edited by: Kimberly Ray
- Music by: Parmer Fuller
- Production companies: Metro-Goldwyn-Mayer; Gibraltar Entertainment
- Distributed by: MGM/UA Communications Co.
- Release date: January 26, 1990
- Running time: 92 minutes
- Country: United States
- Language: English

Mortal Passions is a 1990 American crime film directed by Andrew Lane and written by Alan Moskowitz. The film stars Zach Galligan, Michael Bowen, Krista Errickson, Luca Bercovici, Sheila Kelley and David Warner. The film was released on January 26, 1990, by Metro-Goldwyn-Mayer. It is also the first MGM film in the 1990s.

== Plot ==
A scheming woman named Emily (Krista Errickson) seeks to kill her husband to collect the insurance money, and is willing to seduce anyone she can to do it – including her husband's brother.

== Cast ==
- Zach Galligan as Todd
- Michael Bowen as Berke
- Krista Errickson as Emily
- Luca Bercovici as Darcy
- Sheila Kelley as Adele
- David Warner as Doctor Terrence Powers
- Cassandra Gava as Cinda
- John Denos as Customer in Bar
- Alan Shearman as Pandarus
- Ron Vernan as Paris
- Kathleen Hart as Cafe Waitress
