= Wayne Crawford =

American film director

- Born: Wayne David Crawford; February 11, 1947
- Died: April 30, 2016 (aged 69)
- Other name: Scott Lawrence
- Occupations: Film actor; Television actor; Film producer; Screenwriter; Film director
- Years active: 1970–2016

Wayne David Crawford (February 11, 1947 – April 30, 2016) was an American film and television actor, and film producer, director and screenwriter. Crawford appeared in nearly thirty films, produced fifteen, wrote nine, and directed seven.

Crawford received his Bachelor of Arts degree from Florida Atlantic University and served at the University of North Carolina School of the Arts teaching directing for their School of Filmmaking.

He portrayed the title character in the film Jake Speed, which he also co-wrote and co-produced. Variety Movie Guide said his portrayal was "well played," and that he delivered his lines "as an old-fashioned paperback hero would – in clichés." He directed and starred in Crime Lords, which was called "predictable" by DVD & video guide 2005 while the Variety TV Review called it unpretentious and entertaining.

He co-wrote and co-produced the film Valley Girl with Andrew Lane. He fought against the studio to ensure that Martha Coolidge was maintained as the director.

== Filmography ==
As actor

- Sometimes Aunt Martha Does Dreadful Things (1971)
- God's Bloody Acre (1975)
- Tomcats (1977) (also known as Deadbeat and Avenged)
- Cheering Section (1977)
- Barracuda (1978) (also known as The Lucifer Project)
- Trial by Terror (1983)
- Valley Girl (1983)
- Hill Street Blues (1 episode, 1985) (TV)
- Cagney & Lacey (1 episode, 1985) (TV)
- Showdown at Lincoln High (1986)
- Jake Speed (1986)
- Quiet Thunder (1988) (V)
- White Ghost (1988)
- Rising Storm (1989)
- The Evil Below (1989)
- Headhunter (1989)
- Diary of a Hitman (1991)
- Crime Lords (1991) (V)
- Okavango: The Wild Frontier (1993) (TV series)
- Rising Storm (1993)
- Amerikanskiy Blyuz (1994) (TV)
- Stickfighter (1994)
- U'bejani (1997)
- Snake Island (2002)
- The Company You Keep (2003)
- Rock & Roll Eulogy (2004)
- Forget About It (2006)
- Dog Days of Summer (2007)
- American Heart (5 episodes, 2009) (TV)

As producer

- Sweet Bird of Aquarius (1970)
- God's Bloody Acre (1975)
- Deadbeat (1977)
- Cheering Section (1977)
- Barracuda (1978)
- Valley Girl (1983)
- Night of the Comet (1984)
- Jake Speed (1986)
- Mortal Passions (1989)
- Peacemaker (1990)
- Servants of Twilight (1991)
- Amerikanskiy Blyuz (1994) (TV)
- Trade-Off (1995) (TV)
- Snake Island (2002)
- South of Hell (2005)
- Space Ninjas (2019)

As screenwriter

- God's Bloody Acre (1975)
- Deadbeat (1977)
- Cheering Section (1977)
- Barracuda (1978)
- Trial by Terror (1983)
- Valley Girl (1983)
- Jake Speed (1986)
- U'bejani (1997)
- Snake Island (2002)

As director

- Barracuda (1978)
- The Evil Below (1989)
- Crime Lords (1991) (V)
- Amerikanskiy Blyuz (1994) (TV)
- U'bejani (1997)
- Snake Island (2002)
- South of Hell (2005)
