= Snake Island (film) =

- Film poster.
- Directed by: Wayne Crawford
- Written by: Wayne Crawford; Arthur Payne
- Produced by: Wayne Crawford; Johan Heyns; Arthur Payne
- Starring: William Katt; Wayne Crawford; Kate Connor; Russel Savadier; Dawn Matthews
- Cinematography: Buster Reynolds
- Edited by: Marc Wehner
- Distributed by: DEJ Productions (United States); Fusion International Sales (International)
- Release date: August 2002; (US)
- Running time: 90 min.
- Country: South Africa
- Language: English

Snake Island is a 2002 South African action horror film, starring William Katt, Wayne Crawford, Kate Connor, Russel Savadier and Dawn Matthews. It was co-written, co-produced and directed by Wayne Crawford.

== Premise ==
The film's plot revolves around a group of tourists attempting to survive on a tropical island infested with snakes.

== Cast ==
- William Katt as Malcolm Page
- Wayne Crawford as Jake Malloy
- Kate Connor as Heather Dorsey
- Russel Savadier as Eddie Trent Jones
- Dawn Matthews as Lisa
- Milan Murray as Carrie

== Reception ==
Buzz McClain from Allmovie called it "silly", also writing, "this handsomely produced creature feature is far from scary but is often amusing, albeit in a stomach-tightening way." Black Horror Movies.com gave the film two out of five stars, stating: "By the end, the action is so ridiculous, all I could think about was the Simpsons episode about Snake Whacking Day. You’re better off whacking something else than watching what Snake Island has to offer."

== See also ==
- List of killer snake films
