= Annette McCarthy =

American actress (1958–2023)

- McCarthy in Twin Peaks (1990)
- Born: April 12, 1958
- Died: January 6, 2023 (aged 64)
- Occupations: Actress; musician; chef; director
- Years active: 1978–2023
- Spouse: Mark Mangini (m. 1984, separated)
- Children: 2
- Relatives: Joan Hackett (aunt)

Annette McCarthy (April 12, 1958 – January 6, 2023) was an American film, television and stage actress, musician, and later director at a sound studio and executive chef, best known for her role as Evelyn Marsh in the second season of Twin Peaks, and as Dr. Wendy Oliver in the cult film Creature (1985). She also appeared in several television films and series, including Baywatch and noted episodes of Night Court and Riptide.

== Career ==
McCarthy was stage trained in both New York City and Los Angeles and continued to work in theater. She also acted in several commercials. Earlier in her career, she was also a rock musician, opening for Twisted Sister. She began acting in 1978.

=== Film ===
McCarthy made her feature film debut in Second Thoughts (1983). She would later play Dr. Wendy Oliver in Creature (1985), considered to be her breakout role.

=== Television ===
Under contract to ABC, McCarthy starred in several made-for-TV movies, including her debut A Cry For Love (1980), Crazy Times (1981), and Fugitive Among Us (1992).

McCarthy had roles in a variety of major television shows, including: St. Elsewhere, The Twilight Zone, Happy Days, Beauty and the Beast, Magnum, P.I., The Fall Guy, and played a lesbian character in an episode of Night Court called "Passion Plundered" that has been noted by critics.

A notable role came in Riptide. McCarthy also played "Rosalind Grant", the name derived from Rosalind Russell and Cary Grant but the character itself a parody of Cybill Shepherd's character Maddie Hayes in Moonlighting, in the penultimate episode of the series called "If You Can't Beat Em, Join Em." The episode aired shortly before the series' cancellation, in part due to it being beaten in the ratings by Moonlighting. This episode drew a lot of press attention at the time, with both Entertainment Tonight and the Los Angeles Times running features on it.

She also played wealthy heiress Kathleen Huntington on a few episodes of Baywatch, which was her final on-screen role.

==== Twin Peaks ====
One of her most notable roles was in Twin Peaks. McCarthy had been introduced to the show by Steven Soderbergh, a friend of her husband's, sound editor Mark Mangini, who showed her the pilot. She had a casting meeting with Johanna Ray and was later personally hired by David Lynch. Her character Evelyn Marsh was a controversial addition, appearing in a string of episodes in a storyline that was meant to emulate film noir during a weak stretch of the show's second season, shortly after the conclusion of its main plotline (the reveal of Laura Palmer's killer) when the writers were struggling to come up with new storylines. One episode was one of the rare directorial projects of actress Diane Keaton, which McCarthy found memorable. McCarthy commented on her role in a later interview, saying "my scenes with James (Marshall) were a little overdramatic and some of the lines were pretty silly, but it was cute, what can I say?" Marshall also commented on working with McCarthy, saying, "It was totally fun working with Annette though, she was really cool. She was really fun and a really good actress."

== Personal life ==
McCarthy was born on April 12, 1958, and was the niece of Oscar-nominated actress Joan Hackett.

She majored in theater in the early 1980s. She married sound editor Mark Mangini in 1984, and they had two sons. They separated or divorced some time later.

McCarthy was a babysitter for both Sofia Coppola and Zooey Deschanel.

After her role in Baywatch in 1995, she semi-retired from acting, though she continued to appear in theater and commercials for at least another decade, until 2005. She later became an executive chef, specializing in Italian cuisine, and a director of client services at Mercury Sound Studios.

=== Death ===
McCarthy died on January 6, 2023, at the age of 64.
