= Crazy Times (film) =

1981 film directed by George Reeves

Crazy Times is a 1981 film written and executive produced by George C. Reeves Jr.. The film premiered on ABC. The plot is semi-autobiographical and focuses on a group of teenagers living in Rockaway Beach, Queens in 1955. The film stars Ray Liotta, Michael Paré, David Caruso, Talia Balsam and Annette McCarthy.

== Reception ==
John J. O'Connor of The New York Times praised the film's acting, score and costume design but criticized the script and climax. Steven H. Scheuer described it as a cross between The Lords of Flatbush and Happy Days. The film was nominated for an Emmy Award for Outstanding Achievement in Costumes.
