= Edward R. Murrow Award (Overseas Press Club of America) =

The Edward R. Murrow Award is a journalism award given annually since 1978 by the Overseas Press Club of America for "Best TV, video or documentary interpretation of international affairs with a run time up to 30 minutes." The award is named for Edward R. Murrow, an American broadcast journalist and war correspondent known for and associated with excellence in broadcast journalism.

== See also ==
- List of American television awards
