= Ava Lazar =

American actress

Ava Lazar (born December 31) is an American actress most notable for her role as the first Santana Andrade in NBC's soap opera Santa Barbara. She has been seen in numerous film and television roles. Some better known productions she appeared in include Rocky II (1979), Fast Times at Ridgemont High (1982), Scarface (1983) and Forever Young (1992). Lazar is also a producer of three feature-length films, Nature of the Beast (1995), Mic and the Claw and Trafficking.

Lazar resides in Los Angeles and works as a life coach and creative consultant.
