= Rye House (Litchfield, Connecticut) =

Historic house in Connecticut, United States

- U.S. National Register of Historic Places
- U.S. Historic district
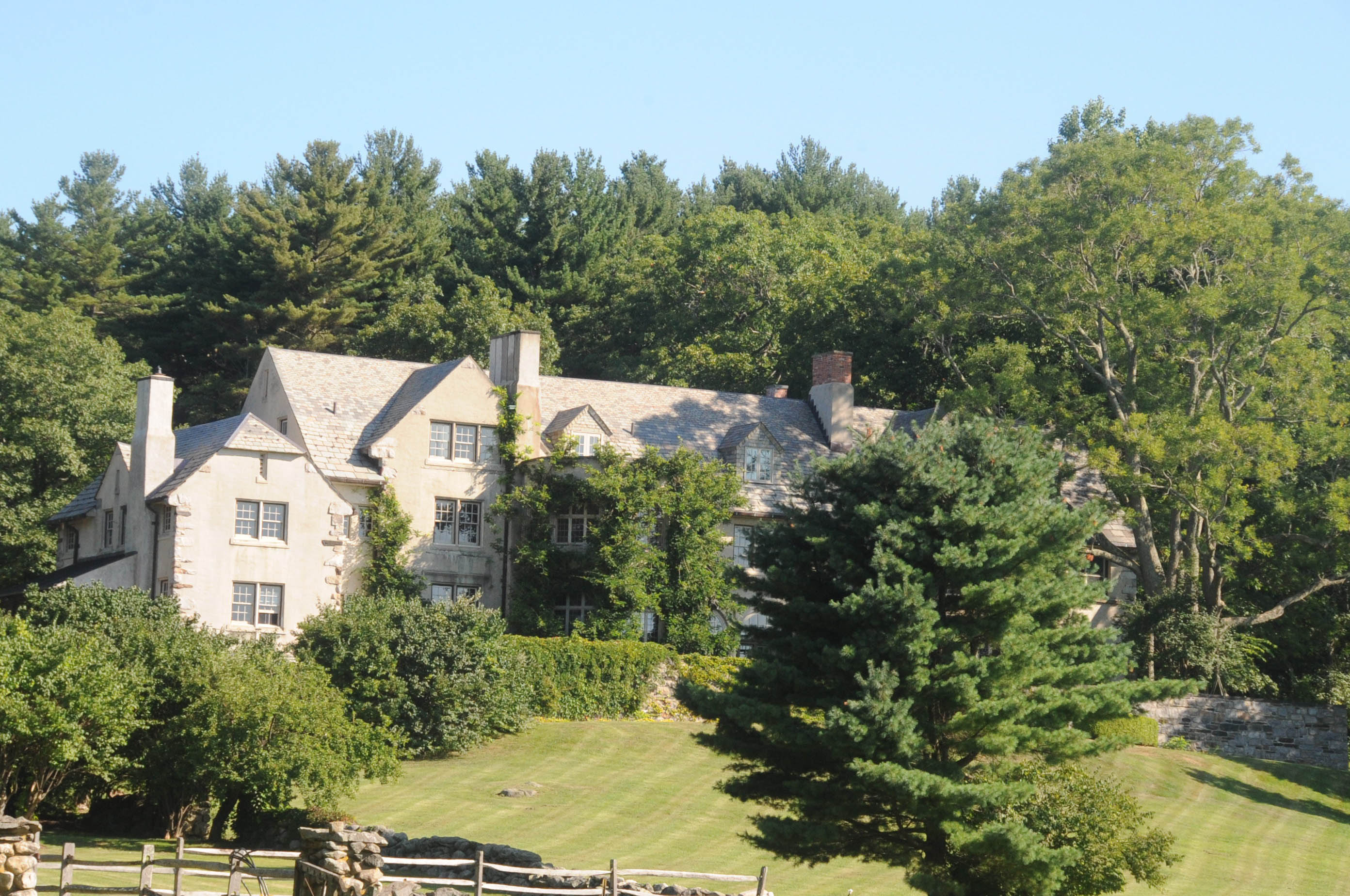

- Location within Connecticut Location within the United States
- Location: 122-132 Old Mount Tom Road, Litchfield, Connecticut
- Coordinates: 41°43′16.7″N 73°16′46.5″W
- Area: 52 acres (21 ha)
- Built: 1910
- Architect: Eyre, Wilson; et al.
- Architectural style: Tudor Revival, Bungalow/craftsman
- NRHP reference No.: 00000940
- Added to NRHP: August 10, 2000

Rye House is a historic summer estate property at 122-132 Old Mount Tom Road in Litchfield, Connecticut. Developed in 1910 for a wealthy New York City widow, it is a prominent local example of Tudor Revival architecture, and a major example of the trend of country estate development in the region. The property was listed on the National Register of Historic Places in 2000.

== Description and history ==
Rye House is located in Litchfield's Bantam borough, at the northwest corner of Old Mount Tom Road and Old Forge Hollow Road. The estate includes the main house, a gardener's cottage, landscaped gardens surrounding the house, and other amenities. The main house is a large 2 1/2-story stone structure, built out of stone that has been stuccoed except for rustic corner quoining. To the west of the house is a formally landscaped garden area, and a lawn extends south toward Old Mount Tom Road, where the property is fringed by trees. The house contains 18 rooms totaling 10,127 square feet. The property includes an Olympic-sized swimming pool and tennis court. The gardener's cottage, itself a substantial construction, is located near the estate entrance, on the west side of its drive. It is two stories in height, and has Bungalow/craftsman styling.

The estate was developed on what was previously farmland by Isabella Douglass Curtis, the widow of a wealthy New York City banker who died in 1895. She named the property in memory of her previous estate in Rye, New York. The house was designed by architect Wilson Eyre, and was completed in 1910; the gardener's cottage was designed by Wilder and White and was built the following year. The property was prominently marketed by Eyre as a showcase, appearing in a writeup in American Architect in 1911, and meeting most of the conditions laid out in his 1908 article "The Planning of Country Houses". Curtis lived here year-round with her son until the 1930s, when financial reverses forced her to sell it.

Recent owners have included actress and model Karen Kopins Shaw, who was Miss Connecticut 1977, and Anderson Cooper and his partner, Benjamin Maisani, who were reported to have bought it in 2014.

== See also ==
- National Register of Historic Places listings in Litchfield County, Connecticut
