= Universal Soldier =

Universal Soldier may refer to:

== Arts, entertainment, and media ==
=== Fictional characters ===
- Luc Deveraux, the main character from the Universal Soldier film series

=== Films ===
- Universal Soldier (film series)
  - Universal Soldier (1992)
  - Universal Soldier II: Brothers in Arms (1998)
  - Universal Soldier III: Unfinished Business (1998)
  - Universal Soldier: The Return (1999)
  - Universal Soldier: Regeneration (2009)
  - Universal Soldier: Day of Reckoning (2012)
- Universal Soldier, a 1971 film directed by Cy Endfield
- Universal Soldiers, a 2007 military science fiction film

== Music ==
- "Universal Soldier" (song), a 1964 song by Buffy Sainte-Marie
- Universal Soldier (1967 Donovan album)
- Universal Soldier (1995 Donovan album)
- Universal Soldier (Pastor Troy album), 2002

== Other ==
- Universal Soldier, rebranded version of the Turrican II: The Final Fight video game
