= Enemies Closer =

- Theatrical release poster
- Directed by: Peter Hyams
- Written by: Eric Bromberg; James Bromberg
- Produced by: Moshe Diamant; Courtney Solomon; Orlando Jones
- Starring: Jean-Claude Van Damme; Tom Everett Scott; Orlando Jones; Linzey Cocker; Christopher Robbie
- Cinematography: Peter Hyams
- Edited by: John Hyams
- Music by: Tony Morales
- Production companies: After Dark Films; Signature Entertainment
- Distributed by: Lionsgate
- Release dates: December 4, 2013 (France); January 24, 2014 (United States)
- Running time: 85 minutes
- Country: United States
- Languages: English; French
- Budget: $5 million

Enemies Closer is a 2013 American action thriller film shot and directed by Peter Hyams and starring Jean-Claude Van Damme, Tom Everett Scott, Orlando Jones and Linzey Cocker. It is Hyams' third directorial collaboration with Van Damme, following 1994's Timecop and 1995's Sudden Death, and the first of these to feature the actor in a villainous role. The plot follows former Navy SEAL Henry Taylor (Scott) who is marked for death by the mourning brother of a comrade he left behind, only to have to team up with him when they both become targets of the deranged crime lord Xander (Van Damme). The film received generally positive reviews from critics, with most reviewers singling out Van Damme's flamboyant performance.

== Plot ==
A plane carrying 50 pounds of pure heroin in sealed packets crashes near the US-Canada border. Immigration and Customs Enforcement (ICE) officers prepare to search for the plane, but a group of criminals led by the unstable Xander (Van Damme) kill them and take the coordinates for the crash: a lake just off King's Island.

On the island, ex-Navy SEAL Henry Taylor (Scott) works as a forest ranger. The only other permanent resident is Sanderson, an elderly hermit. While patrolling, Henry helps a woman named Kayla (Cocker), who invites him to dinner that night.

That evening, a man named Clay (Jones) knocks on Henry's door, claiming to have lost his boat. Henry lets him in, but Clay pulls a gun on him. Clay's younger brother was Decker, a SEAL who was killed in action under Henry's command. Clay plans to kill Henry because he believes Henry abandoned Decker. Henry explains that he if he hadn't withdrawn the squad, all his men would have died, but Clay is unmoved. Clay brings Henry to a field and, holding him at gunpoint, gives him a pistol. Clay orders Henry to commit suicide. Henry refuses, explaining that he was suicidal for years after Decker's death, but with time he has accepted that it wasn't his fault.

Clay prepares to kill Henry, but Xander and his men appear, posing as ICE agents. Henry sees through the ruse, warns Clay, and runs as Xander's men fire. Clay's return fire incapacitates the criminal team's diver. When Xander determines the diver can't dive, he kills him. Xander plans to force Henry, whom he knows from earlier research is a diver, to retrieve the sunken heroin.

Clay agrees to work with Henry to escape. Because Henry's home phone was shot, they go to Sanderson's house but find no functioning phone there. The surprised Sanderson fires a warning shot when they enter, alerting the criminals. As Xander and his men surround the house, Sanderson begs Henry and Clay to escape while he holds them off. Henry refuses to leave Sanderson behind, to Clay's surprise. Sanderson nevertheless sacrifices himself to let the two escape.

Henry, convinced that Xander will kill them both after getting the drugs, lays traps for Xander's men in the forest. Working together, Henry and Clay take out all of Xander's crew.

Meanwhile, Kayla returns after Henry neglects to meet her again. Xander radios Henry and Clay, who have taken a walkie-talkie from one of the criminals, and tells them that he is now holding Kayla hostage. Kayla is gagged with duct tape on her mouth and held at knifepoint by Xander. She is later tied up at gunpoint whilst still being gagged with tape. Henry surrenders himself and agrees to dive for the drugs to save her. Once Xander and Henry are on the water, Clay saves Kayla, untying her and taking the tape off her mouth, only for her pull a gun on him. Kayla has been working with Xander as a honeypot. Clay turns the tables on Kayla and subdues her in a fight.

Henry dives and retrieves the bag of heroin, but he also finds a Magpul ACR, a rifle that functions after being submerged. Henry brings Xander to shore at gunpoint and is confused to see Clay holding Kayla captive. Kayla cries for help; Clay warns Henry in vain of her duplicity and a battle follows. Xander takes advantage and knocks Henry's gun away. Kayla joins the fight to choke Henry but is no match for him, making a mortal mistake.

In the ensuing scuffle, Xander stabs Clay in the leg and, frustrated by Kayla's ineffectiveness, snaps her neck. Xander and Henry eventually end up fighting on Xander's boat. During the fight the fuel tank springs a leak. Xander knocks Henry overboard, but Henry manages to grab a flare. On the water, he ignites the trail of gasoline, causing the boat to explode and killing Xander. Clay helps the exhausted Henry back to the shore.

== Cast ==
- Jean-Claude Van Damme as Xander
- Tom Everett Scott as Park Ranger Henry Taylor
- Orlando Jones as Clay Decker
- Linzey Cocker as Kayla
- Christopher Robbie as Mr. Sanderson
- Zahari Baharov as Saul
- Kris Van Varenberg as François
- Dimo Alexiev as Morris
- Vlado Mikailov as Jean
- Teodor Tsolov as Eto
- Hristo Mitzkov as ICE Agent Wooton
- Ryan Spike Dauner as ICE Agent Spota

== Production ==
Director Peter Hyams was offered the film by producer Moshe Diamant, and accepted it both as a show of friendship and as a stylistic exercise. Hyams is usually his own cinematographer, and a well known fan of night photography. With the movie's main sequence of events taking place entirely at night and close to water, two highly demanding filming conditions, he saw it as a stimulating challenge, especially given its independent budget and tight shooting schedule, which spanned a period of 27 days. Exteriors were filmed in Bulgaria, and interiors were filmed in Louisiana.

Peter Hyams had helped cementing his son John's directing career by serving as his cinematographer on two Universal Soldier sequels produced by Diamant, and the younger Hyams returned the favor by editing this film for his father.

Van Damme was initially going to play the main protagonist, but Hyams asked him to switch to the part of drug trafficker Xander, as he had already directed him twice in heroic roles and did not want to retread the same ground. The Belgian was not easily convinced, as he had just played the appropriately named Jean Vilain in The Expendables 2, and demanded his new role be fleshed out so as to differentiate it from the classic archetype he had portrayed in the earlier feature. With Enemies Closer set in the wilderness, the character was expanded to become a staunch ecologist and vegan, and Van Damme personally devised the "Édith the Goose" monologue that appears midway into the film. Xander's distinctive wild hair was also the actor's idea.

Tom Everett Scott, who took over Van Damme's intended part, is a longtime friend of John Hyams, with whom he attended Syracuse University. After Dark returnee Orlando Jones previously appeared in Peter Hyams' remake of Beyond a Reasonable Doubt. He also received a producer credit this time around.

== Release ==
=== Theatrical ===
Enemies Closer was released theatrically in select U.S. markets by Lionsgate on January 24, 2014. It also saw a theatrical release in the United Arab Emirates in October 2014, where it reached 7th place at the box office.

=== Home video ===
Enemies Closer premiered on DVD and Blu-ray in France via the distribution arm of national broadcaster France Télévisions on December 4, 2013. The film received its domestic home video release through Lionsgate on March 11, 2014. In the United Kingdom, the film was released by Starz Media under its Anchor Bay Entertainment imprint on July 21, 2014.

== Reception ==
The film received mostly positive reviews. Rotten Tomatoes gave the movie a score of 79% based on 14 reviews, with an average rating of 5.71/10 with no consensus as of yet. Metacritic gave the film a weighted average score of 49 out of 100, based on 9 reviews, indicating mixed or average reviews.

Neil Glenzinger of the New York Times found that the collision of the three main characters was "a ridiculous coincidence", but commended Hyams for "[keeping] things moving briskly, building up to an ending with a pretty good plot twist". Scott Foundas of the Chicago Tribune praised the film's multiple narrative threads, although he found it "[to lack] the shrewd, self-aware qualities of Van Damme's recent JCVD and Universal Soldier: Day of Reckoning". He also enjoyed the "crisp, sleek, professional sheen" brought by Hyams, with a special mention for his night photography.

James Marsh of ScreenAnarchy thought that Enemies Closer did not entirely build upon its "intriguing" premise, due to its more urgent preoccupation with showcasing Van Damme, and a reliance on periodic bouts of exposition-heavy dialogue. He still decreed that "it ticks enough of the right boxes to entertain its intended audience". Conversely, Gabe Toro of IndieWire deemed that the subplot involving Scott and Jones did not work, and that the film only found its footing when it focused on the Van Damme character. He gave the film a C rating. Andrew Pollard of British magazine Starburst called the film "a fun, if predictable, actioner" and gave it a 6 out of 10. Matt Zoller Seitz of RogerEbert.com judged that the film "does not rise to the level of [the Hyamses]' best work" but noted "at least two setpieces that are keepers". He gave the film two and a half stars out of four.

Most reviewers singled out Van Damme's flamboyant performance as Xander, with Glenzinger pointing that "he seems to be having a great time" and Pollard hailing his performance as "brilliantly loony". Toro was particularly effusive, calling Van Damme "an arresting presence in his old age" and his performance "a wonder" which, like his turn in the fourth Universal Soldier film, contained shades of Apocalypse Now's Colonel Kurtz. Annlee Ellingson of the Los Angeles Times, however, was not impressed with "the eccentricities of Van Damme's character", and did not find them worthy of taking precedence over his martial arts skills.

Scott's performance as a former Navy SEAL was widely viewed as unconvincing. Ellington labelled him as "terribly miscast". Pollard wrote that "it's hard to really buy into [him] as an action-type of guy", while Toro found him to have "limited charisma" and criticized his reliance on a stunt double. Zoller Seitz was more positive, saying that he and Jones "play their roles earnestly" and "never seem overmatched."

== Soundtrack ==
Enemies Closer: Original Motion Picture Soundtrack

Soundtrack album by Tony Morales
- Released: February 25, 2014
- Genres: Orchestral; electronica
- Length: 49:28
- Label: Lakeshore Records

The film's score was composed by Tony Morales, a former collaborator of Hyams' frequent composer John Debney. It was released digitally by Lakeshore Records on 25 February 2014.
