= Unisol =

Unisol can refer to:

- Universal Soldier (1992 film), a 1992 action movie
- Universal Soldier (cyborg), the supersoldiers in Universal Soldier
- Unisol (game), a logic game
