= Richard Rothstein (screenwriter) =

American screenwriter

Richard David Rothstein (1943 - April 16, 2018) was an American screenwriter and director. He is best known for the original screenplay Universal Soldier, which was followed by five sequels in 1998, 1999, 2009, 2012. He was the creator of the HBO TV series The Hitchhiker as well as the writer/director of many of the episodes. He wrote many screenplays in the science fiction/horror genre and had several graphic novels published. Rothstein died on April 16, 2018, at his home in Los Angeles.

== Biography ==
Rothstein was born in Torrington, Connecticut, and grew up on Long Island. He attended Syracuse University, graduated from New York University, and got a J.D. from Temple Law School. He practiced law in New York for two years before coming to Los Angeles. He and his wife, Bushra, a psychoanalyst, were married for 46 years. They had three children, Sara, Joshua, and Jessie as well as four grandchildren.

== Graphic novels ==
- Baron Von Frankenstein: A Hollywood Fairytale (2013): Viper Comics
- Space Circus (2013): Viper Comics
- Aussie (2014): Viper Comics

== Filmography ==
- Death Valley (1982): writer
- Hard to Hold (1984): writer
- Invitation to Hell (1984): writer
- Bates Motel (1987): writer/director/executive producer
- The Gifted One (1989): writer/executive producer
- The Hitchhiker (1983–1991): writer/director/executive producer
- Double Deception (1993): writer/executive producer
- Universal Soldier (1992): writer/original screenplay
- Universal Soldier II: Brothers in Arms (1998): characters
- Universal Soldier III: Unfinished Business (1998): characters
- Universal Soldier: The Return (1999): characters
- Universal Soldier: Regeneration (2009): characters
- Universal Soldier: Day of Reckoning (2012): characters
