= Raven (film) =

1996 action film directed by Russell Solberg

- Directed by: Russell Solberg
- Written by: Jacobsen Hart
- Produced by: Scott Levitta; Rex Piano; Stu Segall
- Starring: Burt Reynolds; Matt Battaglia; Krista Allen; David Ackroyd
- Cinematography: John Dirlam
- Edited by: Chris Worland
- Music by: Harry Manfredini
- Production company: Stu Segall Productions
- Release date: December 11, 1996; (Germany)
- Running time: 93 minutes
- Country: United States
- Language: English

Raven is a 1996 American direct-to-video action film starring Burt Reynolds.

== Plot ==
A secret government agency known as Four Star Group has sent a team of black-ops soldiers into Bosnia. Their mission is to retrieve a top secret piece of military hardware. On their way home, "Raven" decides to go into business for himself. Raven plans to sell the device on the black market. He tries to convince his partner, "Duce", to sell out as well. Duce refuses, effectively ending their friendship, and leaving Raven no choice but to terminate Duce. Duce escapes with the device, and refuses to give it to Four Star Group.

On returning stateside, Raven assembles a team of ex-special-forces soldiers to help him eliminate Four Star Group. Raven even tracks down Duce, asking if he would like to bury the hatchet and help him take out their former employers. Duce again declines Raven's offer, which doesn't sit well with Raven, placing the two of them on a direct collision course with one another.

== Cast ==
- Burt Reynolds as Jerome "Raven" Katz
- Matt Battaglia as Martin "Duce" Grant
- Krista Allen as Cali Goodwin
- David Ackroyd as Bill Gilley
- Richard Gant as Russ Carlson
- Angela Harry as Eva
- Walter Olkewicz as Bernie DeFrewd
- Christopher Mayer as Hub
- Madison Mason as Governor Sklar
- Kim Chase as Sharon
- Charles Wahlheim as Ablin
- Michael Saad as Adeeb
- Charles Walker as Al Ryan
- Peter Savard as Senator Berg
- Mike White as Mike
- Steve Decker as Steve
- Lauren Hays as Sexy Brunette In Limo
- Julie Bilotta as Sexy Jogger
- Avalon Anders as Marsha (uncredited)

== Production ==
The film was originally called Raven Team. Reynolds said he changed every one of his lines in the script. "The really talented ones understand it's a collaborative effort and if you say something funny they say, 'I wrote that.'" He added, "This movie is very much a copy of that Travolta movie, Broken Arrow... I play the Travolta part. It's a part I can play. It's my part, my persona. And if you play a pink flamingo, you can play one for life, if it's a hit."

In addition to attending the Burt Reynolds Institute for Film and Theatre, co-star Battaglia was a personal acquaintance and protégé of Reynolds, due to a friendship the veteran actor had struck with his father Carmello Battaglia during their days as college football teammates. Battaglia had already appeared next to Reynolds on several occasions, including a two-episode role on Evening Shade. But according to him, the star was unaware that he had been cast in Raven until the beginning of the shoot. The two would co-star again in two made-for-television Universal Soldier sequels in 1998.
