= Universal Soldier: Regeneration =

2010 film by John Hyams

- Official DVD cover
- Directed by: John Hyams
- Written by: Victor Ostrovsky
- Based on: Characters created by Richard Rothstein; Christopher Leitch and Dean Devlin
- Produced by: Craig Baumgarten; Mark Damon; Moshe Diamant; Courtney Solomon
- Starring: Jean-Claude Van Damme; Dolph Lundgren; Andrei Arlovski; Mike Pyle; Garry Cooper; Corey Johnson; Kerry Shale; Aki Avni
- Cinematography: Peter Hyams
- Edited by: Jason Gallagher; John Hyams
- Music by: Kris Hill; Michael Krassner
- Production companies: Foresight Unlimited; Signature Pictures
- Distributed by: Sony Pictures Home Entertainment
- Release dates: October 1, 2009 (Austin Fantastic Fest); February 2, 2010 (United States)
- Running time: 97 minutes
- Country: United States
- Language: English
- Budget: $9 million
- Box office: $844,000

Universal Soldier: Regeneration is a 2009 American science fiction action film directed and co-edited by John Hyams, written by Victor Ostrovsky, and starring Jean-Claude Van Damme and Dolph Lundgren. It is the fifth installment in the Universal Soldier franchise and an alternative sequel to the original Universal Soldier (1992), ignoring the events from the 1999 theatrical sequel Universal Soldier: The Return and the two made for television sequels that were produced in 1998.

Mixed martial artist Andrei Arlovski stars as NGU (Next Generation UniSol), a Universal Soldier of the latest type, along with fellow fighter Mike Pyle as Capt. Kevin Burke. Tekken star Jon Foo appears as a cameo in the film as one of the four UniSols. In the United States the film was released directly to video by Sony Pictures Home Entertainment on February 2, 2010. It had a theatrical release in the Middle East and Southeast Asia and some other territories, grossing $844,000 against a production budget of $9 million. It received mixed reviews. It was followed by a sequel in 2012.

== Plot ==
A group of terrorists called the Pasalan Liberation Front, led by Commander Topov, kidnap the Ukrainian Prime Minister's son and daughter and hold them hostage, demanding the release of their imprisoned comrades within 72 hours. In addition, they have taken over the crippled Chernobyl Nuclear Power Plant and threaten to detonate it if their demands are not met. It is revealed that among the ranks of the terrorists is an experimental Next-Generation UniSol (NGU), who was smuggled in by rogue scientist Dr. Robert Colin. U.S. forces join up with the Ukrainian Army at the plant, but quickly retreat when the NGU slaughters most of them effortlessly. Dr. Richard Porter, Dr. Colin's former colleague on the Universal Soldier program, revives four UniSols to take down the NGU, but they are systematically eliminated.

Former UniSol Luc Deveraux, who is undergoing rehabilitation therapy in Switzerland with Dr. Sandra Fleming with the goal of rejoining society, is taken back by the military to participate in the mission. As the deadline nears its expiration, the prime minister announces the release of the prisoners. The terrorists, having gotten what they wanted, rejoice and shut off the bomb. Dr. Colin, however, is not pleased with the outcome, as he feels his side of the business is not done. As the NGU is programmed not to harm the terrorists, Dr. Colin unleashes his second UniSol: a cloned and upgraded version of Andrew Scott – Deveraux's nemesis – who quickly kills Commander Topov. However, Dr. Colin never considered Scott's mental instability, and he is killed by his own creation. Scott then reactivates the bomb before heading out to hunt the children.

In the midst of the chaos, Capt. Kevin Burke is sent in to infiltrate the plant and rescue the prime minister's children. He is successful in locating them and leads them toward safety. On their way out, they encounter the NGU. The children flee as Kevin tries in vain to hold off the NGU, who stabs him to death after a brutal fight.

With 30 minutes remaining on the bomb's timer, a re-conditioned Luc is geared up and sent to the plant, where he kills every terrorist he encounters. He searches the buildings and finds the children cornered by Scott. Scott, who has distorted memories of Luc, is about to kill the children when Luc attacks and a grueling fight ensues. In the end, Luc impales Scott on the forehead with a lead pipe and fires a shotgun through it, blowing his brains out.

As Luc escorts the children to safety, they are attacked by the NGU. Luc and the NGU take the fight to the site of the bomb, with less than two minutes remaining. During the melee, Luc removes the detonator and jams it in the back of the NGU's uniform as they both jump out of the reactor chamber. The NGU pulls the detonator off his back as it explodes, taking him with it. U.S. soldiers quickly arrive on the scene and tend to the children as Luc leaves. Kevin's body is placed in a black bag and taken away, as well as recovered pieces of the NGU. In Langley, Virginia, Kevin's body is shown stored in a cryogenic chamber as a new UniSol, along with multiple clones made of him.

== Cast ==
- Jean-Claude Van Damme as Private Luc Deveraux
- Dolph Lundgren as Sergeant Andrew Scott
- Andrei Arlovski as NGU
- Mike Pyle as Captain Kevin Burke
- Corey Johnson as Colonel John Coby
- Garry Cooper as Dr. Richard Porter
- Emily Joyce as Dr. Sandra Fleming
- Zahari Baharov as Commander Topov
- Aki Avni as Colonel Petrov
- Kerry Shale as Dr. Robert Colin
- Yonko Dimitrov as Dimitri
- Violeta Markovska as Ivana
- Stanislav Pishtalov as Prime Minister Musayev
- Marianna Stanisheva as Olga
- John Laskowski as Captain
- Kristopher Van Varenberg as Miles
- Jon Foo as UniSol 2

== Production ==
Most of the scenes were filmed on-location in Bulgaria. The car chase scene was filmed on the streets of the capital, Sofia, and others at a former military school. The Chernobyl plant scenes were filmed at the former Kremikovtzi AD steel factory.

In a phone interview between director John Hyams and the Van Damme fanbase, the director commented:

I am hoping that we are taking a film that was made a long time ago and we are now trying to present these characters in a contemporary context, and that means stylistically contemporary and to use my own taste, something that feels like it belongs in this era of film making. I also think that that film is a bit of a nostalgia piece, not only to late '80s but also early '90s.

The music in the film was a synth score and to me was something that was reminiscent of the John Carpenter movies that I loved growing up, like The Thing, Carpenter would always have these great synth scores. Another piece we used was the group Tangerine Dream did a great score for the movie Sorcerer and taking a note from films like Blade Runner, movies influenced me and my idea of science fiction and action film making and take all the work I did in documentaries and the work I did within MMA and taking all those elements and putting them together to create a style of the film that I think is very different to the first two films, but I think fans of the first two will appreciate and maybe people who haven't seen them will appreciate it.

I hope that we have breathed some life into the franchise. Some of the powers that be have certainly talked about doing another one already, whether that happens or not involves a lot of elements to come together. With what's happening with the storylines, we could certainly go in a number of directions.

Filmmaker Peter Hyams, John's father, served as the film's cinematographer. This film marked the first time Peter has acted as director of photography without also directing. Prior to Regeneration, Peter had collaborated with star Van Damme on the action thriller films Timecop and Sudden Death.

== Release ==
=== Theatrical ===
The film premiered at the Fantastic Fest in Austin, Texas, U.S.A. on October 1, 2009.

The film was theatrically released in Israel on January 7, 2010, followed by the Philippines on January 8, followed by both Bahrain and the United Arab Emirates on January 27, both Malaysia and Singapore on January 28. A month later, it was released in Lebanon on March 25, Jordan on March 31 and Japan on June 26.

=== Home media ===
The film was officially released in the United States directly on DVD and Blu-ray on February 2, 2010, on February 9 in Brazil, April 5 in the United Kingdom, and May 4 in France and Germany.

== Reception ==
=== Box office ===
The film was released directly to home media in the US and Europe, as well and the following figures do not include theatrical box office reports from other territories such as Israel, Japan or South Korea. As of April 7, 2010, the film has grossed $844,447 in United Arab Emirates, Singapore, Italy, Lebanon, Malaysia and the Philippines.

=== Critical response ===
Dread Central awarded Universal Soldier: Regeneration a score of 3 out of 5, saying that "there is almost nothing but solid b-level action until the credits roll". In a retrospective, Tom Breihan of The A.V. Club called it the most significant action movie of 2009, crediting it with providing newfound levels of critical legitimacy to the straight-to-DVD format, and describing it as "good enough to leave its theatrical predecessor in the dust".

David Nusair of Reel Film Reviews gave it 1.5 out of 4 and called it "distractingly low-rent", a "mostly interminable mess" but that the sole saving grace was the "brutal fight sequences". He writes it off as a "misfire and a massive disappointment".

== Sequel ==
Van Damme and Lundgren returned for a sixth installment, Universal Soldier: Day of Reckoning, as the first in the series to be filmed in 3-D. John Hyams also returned as director.
