= Universal Soldier (film series) =

Series of American military science fiction action films

- Created by: Richard Rothstein; Christopher Leitch; Dean Devlin
- Owners: TriStar Pictures (Universal Soldier, Universal Soldier: The Return); The Movie Channel (Universal Soldier II: Brothers in Arms, Universal Soldier III: Unfinished Business); Sony Pictures Home Entertainment (Universal Soldier: Regeneration); Magnet Releasing (Universal Soldier: Day of Reckoning)
- Years: 1992–2012

Films and television
- Films: Universal Soldier (1992); Universal Soldier: The Return (1999)
- Television films: Universal Soldier II: Brothers in Arms (1998); Universal Soldier III: Unfinished Business (1998)
- Direct-to-video: Universal Soldier: Regeneration (2009); Universal Soldier: Day of Reckoning (2012)

Universal Soldier is a series of American military science fiction action films. The franchise began in 1992 with Universal Soldier and as of 2012 comprises six entries. The films centered on the character of Luc Deveraux (played first by Jean-Claude Van Damme and then by Matt Battaglia) until Universal Soldier: Day of Reckoning, which focuses on a new protagonist named John (played by Scott Adkins).

Film and television critic Matt Zoller Seitz stated that the Universal Soldier franchise "is a rare series that takes more creative risks as it goes along".

== Films ==
Film	U.S. release date	Director(s)	Producer(s)	Screenwriter(s)
Universal Soldier	July 10, 1992	Roland Emmerich	Mario Kassar & Allen Shapiro	Dean Devlin, Richard Rothstein & Christopher Leitch
Universal Soldier II: Brothers in Arms	September 27, 1998	Jeff Woolnough	Robert Wertheimer	Peter M. Lenkov
Universal Soldier III: Unfinished Business	October 24, 1998	Jeff Woolnough	Robert Wertheimer	Peter M. Lenkov
Universal Soldier: The Return	August 20, 1999	Mic Rodgers	Allen Shapiro, Daniel Melnick, Michael I. Rachmil & Jean-Claude Van Damme	John Fasano & William Malone
Universal Soldier: Regeneration	February 2, 2010	John Hyams	Mark Damon, Moshe Diamant, Craig Baumgarten & Courtney Solomon	Victor Ostrovsky
Universal Soldier: Day of Reckoning	October 25, 2012	John Hyams	Moshe Diamant, Allen Shapiro, Craig Baumgarten & Courtney Solomon	John Hyams, Jon Greenlagh & Doug Magnuson

=== Universal Soldier (1992) ===
Directed by Roland Emmerich and written by Richard Rothstein, Christopher Leitch, and Dean Devlin, it stars Jean-Claude Van Damme, Dolph Lundgren, and Ally Walker.

In the first installment of the franchise, American soldier Luc Deveraux (Van Damme) finds that his superior officer, Andrew Scott (Lundgren), has turned violently deranged, and the two fight to the death during the Vietnam War. After their bodies are retrieved, they are placed into a secret program in which they are reanimated as superhuman agents and trained to become unquestioning killing machines. While Devereaux and Scott initially have no memory of their former lives, glimpses of their pasts start to return, rekindling their intense conflict.

=== Universal Soldier II: Brothers in Arms (1998) ===
After the original film was released, Carolco, the production company that backed the film, went bankrupt and sold the rights of the series to Skyvision Entertainment, located in Toronto, in 1995. As a result, two TV films were released direct-to-video starring Matt Battaglia as Luc Deveraux and Chandra West as Veronica Roberts in Universal Soldier II: Brothers in Arms and Universal Soldier III: Unfinished Business. The films were produced for Showtime / The Movie Channel as a miniseries meant as a backdoor pilot for a series.

Directed by Jeff Woolnough and written by Peter M. Lenkov, the film stars Matt Battaglia, Chandra West, and Gary Busey.

This direct-to-video sequel takes place exactly after the events of the original Universal Soldier. Following the events of the original Universal Soldier testing, the budget has been slashed by the government; however, under the orders of a CIA director, a gang of mercenaries take control of the new line of Universal Soldiers and try to use them into helping to smuggle diamonds to the highest foreign buyer. Meanwhile, Luc Deveraux (Matt Battaglia) and Veronica Roberts (Chandra West) are in hiding on his parents’ farm. The UniSol controllers then activate a homing beacon embedded inside Deveraux's body that makes him return to the UniSol base in Chicago where his memory is reprogrammed. Veronica follows and while sneaking into the UniSol lab to rescue Luc, she discovers that his older brother Eric, a deceased soldier from Vietnam, has also been resurrected.

=== Universal Soldier III: Unfinished Business (1998) ===
Once again, directed by Jeff Woolnough and written by Peter M. Lenkov, the film stars Matt Battaglia, Chandra West, Jeff Wincott, and Burt Reynolds.

Luc Devereaux (Battaglia) and Veronica Roberts (Chandra West) continue their attempts to expose the Universal Soldier unit. After a hostage situation mistakenly leaves Veronica a fugitive, the two escape the city and go into hiding. Meanwhile, CIA Deputy Director Mentor (Burt Reynolds) and Dr. Walker are in the process of creating a powerful UniSol clone of Luc's brother, Eric (Jeff Wincott), to assassinate him and Veronica.

=== Universal Soldier: The Return (1999) ===
Directed by Mic Rodgers and written by William Malone and John Fasano, starring Jean-Claude Van Damme, Michael Jai White, and Bill Goldberg.

In this theatrical sequel to the original film (while ignoring the previous two television films), Luc Deveraux (Van Damme) had been reverted to human state and has a 13-year-old daughter called Hillary. He works with scientist Dylan Cotner to create a new, safer breed of fighters that are connected through an artificially intelligent computer system called S.E.T.H. (Self-Evolving Thought Helix). The project loses funding, and the supercomputer is scheduled to be turned off. To preserve itself S.E.T.H. takes over a superior UniSol model (White) and kidnaps Hillary. Deveraux must save his daughter and prevent the machine from destroying mankind.

=== Universal Soldier: Regeneration (2009) ===
Directed by John Hyams and written by Victor Ostrovsky, starring Jean-Claude Van Damme, Dolph Lundgren, and Andrei "The Pit Bull" Arlovski.

In this revival of the franchise, Regeneration disregards the events of The Return as well as its made-for-cable predecessors by beginning the film with Former UniSol Luc Deveraux (Van Damme) undergoing rehabilitation therapy in Switzerland under Dr. Sandra Fleming with the goal of rejoining society. However, when a terrorist sect uses an experimental Next Generation UniSol (NGU) to seize the atomic reactor at Chernobyl, Deveraux is reactivated to save the country from a nuclear catastrophe. Deveraux also has to contend with his nemesis, "Andrew" (Dolph Lundgren), the clone of his former Universal Soldier colleague who's been employed by the terrorists.

=== Universal Soldier: Day of Reckoning (2012) ===
Directed by John Hyams, written by John Hyams, Doug Magnuson, and Jon Greenlagh, it stars Jean-Claude Van Damme, Dolph Lundgren, Andrei "The Pit Bull" Arlovski, and Scott Adkins.

In the film, Luc Devereaux, who went rogue, has created a terrifying army of cloned UniSols determined to infiltrate the government which they hold responsible for their pain. A special agent called John, willing to avenge his murdered family, is pitted against Deveraux and a new clone of Andrew Scott.

=== Future ===
Todd Black and Jason Blumenthal hired Richard Wenk to write the reboot in October 2018, with the story focusing on one resurrected soldier.

== Television ==
In October 2011, writer Damien Kindler was set to write a Universal Soldier TV series for FremantleMedia North America with producers from the original film Allen Shapiro and Craig Baumgarten attached to the project.

== Cast and crew ==
=== Principal cast ===
Character	Films					
Character	Universal Soldier	Universal Soldier II: Brothers in Arms	Universal Soldier III: Unfinished Business	Universal Soldier: The Return	Universal Soldier: Regeneration	Universal Soldier: Day of Reckoning
Character	1992	1998	1998	1999	2009	2012
Luc Deveraux	Jean-Claude Van Damme	Matt Battaglia	Matt Battaglia	Jean-Claude Van Damme	Jean-Claude Van Damme	Jean-Claude Van Damme
Sergeant Andrew Scott	Dolph Lundgren	Andrew Jackson			Dolph Lundgren	Dolph Lundgren
Veronica Roberts	Ally Walker	Chandra West	Chandra West			
Soldier / S.E.T.H.	Michael Jai White			Michael Jai White		
Eric Deveraux		Jeff Wincott	Jeff Wincott			
CIA Deputy Director Mentor		Burt Reynolds	Burt Reynolds			
Romeo				Bill Goldberg		
Captain Blackburn				Justin Lazard		
Erin Young				Heidi Schanz		
Maggie				Kiana Tom		
Magnus / NGU					Andrei Arlovski	Andrei Arlovski
Miles					Kristopher Van Varenberg	Kristopher Van Varenberg
Dr. Colin					Kerry Shale	
Dr. Porter					Garry Cooper	
John						Scott Adkins

=== Additional crew ===
Crew/detail	Film					
Crew/detail	Universal Soldier	Universal Soldier II: Brothers in Arms	Universal Soldier III: Unfinished Business	Universal Soldier: The Return	Universal Soldier: Regeneration	Universal Soldier: Day of Reckoning
Composer(s)	Christopher Franke	Steve Pecile; John Kastner; Ivan Dorochuk; Crunch Recording Group		Don Davis	Kris Hill; Michael Krassner	Robin Vining; Wil Hendricks; Michael Krassner
Cinematography	Karl Walter Lindenlaub	Russell Goozee	Russell Goozee	Mike Benson	Peter Hyams	Yaron Levy
Editor	Michael J. Duthie	Mike Lee	Robert K. Sprogis	Peck Prior	John Hyams; Jason Gallagher	John Hyams; Andrew Drazek
Production company	Carolco Pictures; Centropolis Entertainment; IndieProd Company Productions	Unisol Productions; Catalyst Entertainment	Unisol Productions; Catalyst Entertainment	Long Road Entertainment; IndieProd Company Productions; Baummgarten-Prophet Entertainment	BMP Production; Signature Entertainment	BMP Production; Signature Entertainment
Distribution/Network	TriStar Pictures	The Movie Channel	The Movie Channel	TriStar Pictures	Foresight Unlimited; Sony Pictures Home Entertainment	Magnet Releasing; Foresight Unlimited
Runtime	102 minutes	92 minutes	95 minutes	89 minutes	97 minutes	114 minutes
U.S. release date	July 10, 1992	September 27, 1998	October 24, 1998	August 20, 1999	February 2, 2010	November 30, 2012

== Storyline continuity ==
Universal Soldier story chronology
Original continuity
- Universal Soldier
- Universal Soldier II: Brothers in Arms
- Universal Soldier III: Unfinished Business
The Return continuity
- Universal Soldier
- Universal Soldier: The Return
New continuity
- Universal Soldier
- Universal Soldier: Regeneration
- Universal Soldier: Day of Reckoning

Universal Soldier: Regeneration revived the franchise in 2009 by disregarding the events of The Return, as well as its made-for-cable predecessors. A Collider article that focuses on Day of Reckoning and interviews the film's director states that the latest installment in the franchise is "either the third, fourth or sixth film in the franchise depending on if you include the pair of non-canon direct-to-television sequels and/or the totally retconned Universal Soldier: The Return"; despite it, minor elements from these films can be found within the canon series including UniSol clones and UniSol sleeper-agents (from II and III).

== Production ==
The Universal Soldier franchise began in 1992 with Universal Soldier, starring Jean-Claude Van Damme and Dolph Lundgren. The series centers on two American soldiers, Luc Deveraux (Van Damme) and Andrew Scott (Lundgren), who are killed during the Vietnam War and reanimated in the 1990s as highly advanced Universal Soldiers.

After Universal Soldier was released, Carolco, the production company that backed the film, went bankrupt and sold the rights of the series to Skyvision Entertainment, located in Toronto, in 1995. As a result, two TV films were released as television films starring Matt Battaglia as Luc Deveraux and Chandra West as Veronica Roberts in Universal Soldier II: Brothers in Arms and Universal Soldier III: Unfinished Business. The films were produced for Showtime / The Movie Channel as a miniseries meant as a backdoor pilot for a series.

In 1999, Van Damme returned for the fourth installment, Universal Soldier: The Return. An overwhelming critical and financial failure, The Return contradicted several elements of the previous film's plot by making Luc Deveraux no longer a Universal Soldier, giving him a daughter, and removing female protagonist Veronica Roberts.

The subsequent film in the series, Universal Soldier: Regeneration, revived the franchise in 2009, disregarding the events of The Return, as well as its made-for-cable predecessors. Universal Soldier: Day of Reckoning featured Van Damme and Lundgren in much smaller roles, and introduced a new protagonist named John (Scott Adkins) fighting against both Deveraux and Scott.

== Reception ==
=== Box office performance ===
Film	Release date	Box office revenue			Box office ranking		Budget	Reference
Film	Release date	United States	Other territories	Worldwide	All time domestic	All time worldwide	Budget	Reference
Universal Soldier	July 10, 1992	$36,299,898	$59,000,000	$95,299,898	#1,835		$23 million	
Universal Soldier II: Brothers in Arms	September 27, 1998							
Universal Soldier III: Unfinished Business	October 24, 1998							
Universal Soldier: The Return	August 20, 1999	$10,717,421	$270,000	$10,937,893	#3,837		$45 million	
Universal Soldier: Regeneration	October 1, 2009	$844,447		$844,447			$9 million	
Universal Soldier: Day of Reckoning	November 30, 2012	$5,460	$363,719	$369,179	#11,358		$8 million	
Total		$48,087,698	$59,633,719	$107,230,945	—N/a	—N/a	$85 million	—N/a

=== Critical and public response ===
Film	Rotten Tomatoes	Metacritic	CinemaScore
Universal Soldier	35% (29 reviews)	35 (15 reviews)	B
Universal Soldier II: Brothers in Arms	0% (7 reviews)	—N/a	—N/a
Universal Soldier III: Unfinished Business	20% (5 reviews)	—N/a	—N/a
Universal Soldier: The Return	5% (58 reviews)	24 (14 reviews)	C-
Universal Soldier: Regeneration	N/A (1 reviews)	70 (4 reviews)	—N/a
Universal Soldier: Day of Reckoning	56% (50 reviews)	58 (18 reviews)	—N/a

== Other media ==
=== Comic book ===
NOW Comics published a three-part comic miniseries based on the first film, from September to November 1992.

=== Video games ===
A video game based on the film, also titled Universal Soldier, was developed by The Code Monkeys and published by Accolade in 1992. The game was a conversion of Turrican II: The Final Fight for the Sega Genesis and Game Boy. Another version was developed later for the SNES, but was never released.

== See also ==
- Universal Soldiers, an unrelated film distributed by The Asylum
