= John Hyams =

American screenwriter and film director

- Occupations: Film director; screenwriter; cinematographer
- Years active: 1986–present

John Hyams is an American screenwriter, director and cinematographer, best known for his involvement in the Universal Soldier series, for which he has directed two installments. Hyams is the son of director Peter Hyams.

== Career ==
Hyams graduated from Syracuse University School of Visual and Performing Arts, becoming a noted painter and sculptor exhibiting and selling work in New York and Los Angeles. He became known in Hollywood in 1997 after writing, producing, and directing the critically acclaimed One Dog Day. The film debuted at the Taos Talking Picture Film Festival. After that, Hyams directed several documentaries, most notably The Smashing Machine, which follows the life of fighter Mark Kerr. Hyams also directed several episodes of ABC Television's NYPD Blue.

In 2009, Hyams took over the Universal Soldier franchise, directing the film Regeneration, starring Jean-Claude Van Damme and Dolph Lundgren. It was shot mostly in Bulgaria on a budget of $9 million. Then, in 2012, he wrote and produced a sequel called Day of Reckoning, which also featured Van Damme and Lundgren. It was shot in 3D with a budget of $8 million.

Over the course of 2014 and 2015, Hyams directed several episodes of the horror series Z Nation, including the pilot. Hyams has also directed for numerous other TV series, including Chicago P.D., Chicago Fire, and Chucky, and acted as showrunner for the Z Nation spin-off Black Summer. In 2018 he returned to feature work with the independent comedy-drama All Square, starring Michael Kelly. In 2020 he directed the thriller Alone, and in 2022 the Kevin Williamson-scripted, Blumhouse-produced horror film Sick.

== Filmography ==
=== Feature films ===
Title	Year	Credited as				Notes
Title	Year	Director	Producer	Writer	Editor	Notes
One Dog Day	1997	Yes	Yes	Yes	No	
The Smashing Machine: The Life and Times of Extreme Fighter Mark Kerr	2002	Yes	Co-	No	Yes	Documentary
Rank	2006	Yes	Yes	No	Yes	Documentary
Beyond a Reasonable Doubt	2009	No	Associate	No	No	
Universal Soldier: Regeneration	2009	Yes	No	No	Yes	
Dragon Eyes	2012	Yes	No	No	Yes	
Universal Soldier: Day of Reckoning	2012	Yes	No	Yes	Yes	
Skin Trade	2014	No	No	Uncredited	No	
All Square	2018	Yes	No	No	No	
Alone	2020	Yes	No	No	Yes	
Sick	2022	Yes	No	No	No	
The Shepherd	TBA	Yes	No	No	No	

=== Short films ===
Title	Year	Credited as				Notes
Title	Year	Director	Producer	Writer	Editor	Notes
Fight Day	2003	Yes	No	No	Yes	Featurette
Cowtown: Bull Riding Sessions	2006	Yes	Yes	No	No	Featurette
The Razzle Dazzle	2009	Yes	Co-	No	No	
The Ignorant Bliss of Sun and Moon	2010	Yes	No	No	Yes	Also cinematographer and sound editor
Days of Reckoning: The Making of Universal Soldier 4	2013	No	Yes	No	No	Featurette

=== Television ===
The numbers in directing and writing credits refer to the number of episodes.

Title	Year	Credited as					Network	Notes
Title	Year	Creator	Director	Producer	Writer	Executive producer	Network	Notes
NYPD Blue	2003–2005	No	Yes (4)	Yes	No	No	ABC	Producer (season 12)
Blind Justice	2005	No	Yes (1)	No	No	No	ABC	
Z Nation	2014–2017	No	Yes (9)	Co-	Yes (5)	Co-	Syfy	Co-producer (season 1; 8 episodes); Co-executive producer (season 2; 13 episodes)
The Originals	2016–2017	No	Yes (3)	No	No	No	The CW	
12 Deadly Days	2016	No	Yes (1)	No	No	No	YouTube Red	Anthology series
Chicago P.D.	2017–2025	No	Yes (7 episodes)	No	No	No	NBC	
Chicago Fire	2017	No	Yes (1)	No	No	No	NBC	
Legacies	2019	No	Yes (1)	No	No	No	The CW	
Black Summer	2019–2021	Yes	Yes (9)	No	Yes (5)	Yes	Netflix	Also showrunner
Roswell, New Mexico	2022	No	Yes (1)	No	No	No	The CW	
Chucky	2022–2023	No	Yes (3)	No	No	No	Syfy; USA Network	
Teacup	2024	No	Yes (2)	No	No	No	Peacock	
The Rookie	2025	No	Yes (1)	No	No	No	ABC	
The Recruit	2025	No	Yes (1)	No	No	No	Netflix	
