= Mark Damon =

American film actor and producer (1933–2024)

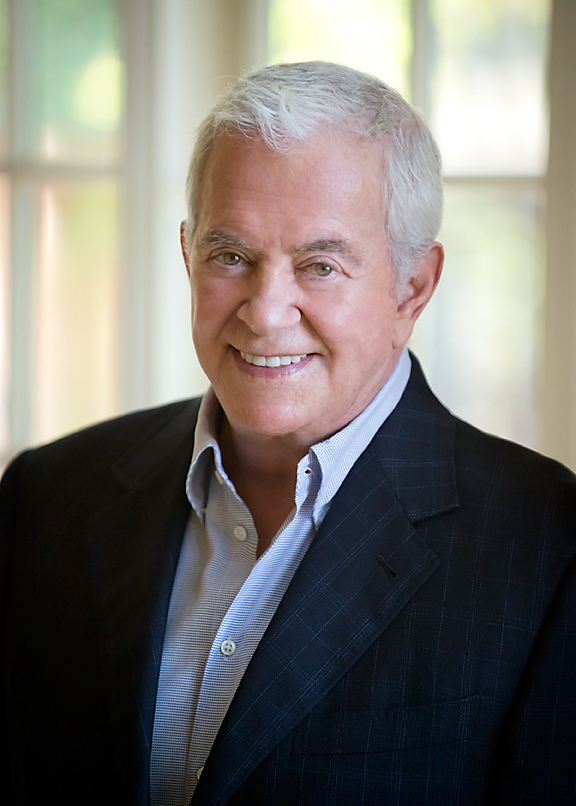
- Damon in 2015
- Born: Alan Harris; April 22, 1933; Chicago, Illinois, U.S.
- Died: May 12, 2024 (aged 91); Los Angeles, California, U.S.
- Resting place: Mount Sinai Memorial Park, Hollywood Hills, California, U.S.
- Education: UCLA Anderson School of Management (MBA)
- Occupations: Actor, producer
- Years active: 1956-2024
- Spouses: Barbara Frey (m. 1971; div. 1973); Margaret Markov (m. 1974)
- Children: 2

Mark Damon (born Alan Harris; April 22, 1933 – May 12, 2024) was an American film producer and actor. In 1960, he won the Golden Globe Award for New Star of the Year for his performance in Roger Corman's House of Usher, and later moved to Italy to work in Spaghetti Westerns. He was a member of the 1960s Dolce Vita set of actors and actresses in Rome. During the early 1970s, he switched to producing films, founding the production companies Producers Sales Organization, Vision International, MDP Worldwide, and Foresight Unlimited.

== Early life ==
Mark Damon, the son of a grocer, was born Alan Harris in Chicago. His family was Jewish, and their surname was originally Herscovitz. Damon moved to Los Angeles at a young age where he attended Fairfax High School.

As a senior in high school, Damon was scouted as an actor by comedian Groucho Marx, but chose to attend dental school at UCLA. He switched to the Anderson School of Management, eventually graduating with an MBA and a BA in English. Damon also began taking theater classes and pursued a career in acting.

== Career ==
=== Actor ===
In 1956, Damon started his career in Hollywood, signing a contract with 20th Century Fox. In 1960, Damon won a Golden Globe Award as a "Star of Tomorrow" for his performance in the film House of Usher. He moved to Italy to work in Spaghetti Westerns.

=== Producer ===
In the mid-1970s, Damon left acting to become a film producer. He entered the world of independent sales and production while in Italy after meeting independent international distributors interested in popular American movies.

Upon returning to the U.S. in 1977, he founded Producers Sales Organization (PSO), which sold American pictures to international distributors, becoming the first such company to compete with the major studios. Damon's subsequent success with PSO led to his reputation as the inventor of the foreign sales business. After PSO ran into financial problems and was forced to file for bankruptcy in 1986, Damon started Vision Productions (formerly Vision Producers and Distribution Group) with Peter Guber and Jon Peters.

In 1987, Vision International grew into Vision p.d.g. Vision International formed a pact with Epic Productions, where it assumed international responsibilities for the studio.

In 1993, after a period of legal battling with Credit Lyonnais over the company's control of Epic, Damon started MDP Worldwide (aka Mark Damon Productions), which in 1998 was sold to Behaviour Communications, a Canadian company. In 2003, MDP Worldwide was renamed Media 8 Entertainment to expand its theatrical activity and its products. Damon resigned in 2004.

Damon's productions have grossed over $2 billion in theatrical box office worldwide and have garnered 10 Oscar nominations. He has been involved in the international licensing of over 300 feature length pictures, including Never Say Never Again, Prizzi's Honor, Once Upon A Time In America, The Cotton Club, and The Final Countdown. Damon was a founding member of the American Film Marketing Association (now IFTA), and he was a recurring board member of the IFTA.

In 2005, Damon founded the film production and sales company Foresight Unlimited. Foresight handled the international sales for the Rob Reiner comedy And So It Goes, served as executive producer of Universal Studios' 2 Guns, and Universal's Lone Survivor. The company was sold to Chicken Soup for the Soul Entertainment in 2019. In 2019, DCR Finance Group launched a $100 million film fund to produce its film organization, with Damon as managing partner.

== Personal life and death ==
Damon died of natural causes in Los Angeles in 2024 at 91, with his wife, actress Margaret Markov, and two children by his side. He was a cousin to composer Danny Elfman.

== Filmography ==
Year	Title	Role	Notes
2024	Saint Clare	Executive Producer	Starring Bella Thorne
2023	Rumble Through the Dark	Executive Producer	Starring Aaron Eckhart and Bella Thorne
2023	Fast Charlie	Executive Producer	Starring Pierce Brosnan
2022	9 Bullets	Executive Producer	
2021	Best Sellers	Executive Producer	
2021	Willy's Wonderland	Executive Producer	Starring Nicolas Cage
2019	The Last Full Measure	Producer	
2018	The Hurricane Heist	Producer	
2017	Blind	Executive Producer	Starring Alec Baldwin
2014	And So It Goes	Producer	Starring Michael Douglas and Diane Keaton
2013	Lone Survivor	Executive Producer	Starring Mark Wahlberg
2013	2 Guns	Executive Producer	Starring Denzel Washington and Mark Wahlberg
2012	Universal Soldier: Day of Reckoning	Executive Producer	Starring Jean-Claude Van Damme and Dolph Lundgren
2011	Flypaper	Producer	Starring Patrick Dempsey and Ashley Judd
2011	The Ledge	Producer	Starring Charlie Hunnam, Liv Tyler, and Terrence Howard
2009	Universal Soldier: Regeneration	Executive Producer	Starring Jean-Claude Van Damme and Dolph Lundgren
2009	It's Alive	Executive Producer	
2009	Beyond a Reasonable Doubt	Producer	Starring Michael Douglas
2007	Captivity	Producer	
2006	O Jerusalem	Producer	
2005	The Upside of Anger	Executive Producer	Starring Kevin Costner and Joan Allen
2004	Beyond The Sea	Executive Producer	Starring Kevin Spacey
2004	The I Inside	Producer	
2003	Monster	Producer	Starring Charlize Theron; Academy Award for Best Actress; Independent Spirit Award for Best First Feature
2003	11:14	Executive Producer	
2003	The United States of Leland	Executive Producer	Starring Don Cheadle
2002	Extreme Ops	Executive Producer	
2002	FeardotCom	Executive Producer	
2001	The Musketeer	Executive Producer	
2001	The Body	Executive Producer	
2000	Love & Sex	Executive Producer	
1999	Eye of the Beholder	Executive Producer	Starring Ewan McGregor
1999	A Dog of Flanders	Executive Producer	
1997	Deceiver	Wayland's Father; Executive Producer	
1997	The Blackout	Executive Producer	
1997	The Second Jungle Book: Mowgli & Baloo	Executive Producer	
1996	The Winner	Executive Producer	
1994	The Jungle Book	Executive Producer	
1993	Stalingrad	Executive Producer	
1991	Diary of a Hitman	Executive Producer	
1991	Inner Sanctum	Executive Producer	
1990	Vietnam, Texas	Executive Producer	
1990	Dark Angel	Executive Producer	
1989	Wild Orchid	Producer	Starring Mickey Rourke
1988	High Spirits	Executive Producer	
1988	Bat*21	Co-Producer	
1988	Mac and Me	Executive Producer	
1987	The Lost Boys	Executive Producer	
1986	Flight of the Navigator	Executive Producer	
1986	Short Circuit	Executive Producer	
1986	8 Million Ways to Die	Executive Producer	Starring Jeff Bridges
1986	9½ Weeks	Producer	Starring Mickey Rourke and Kim Basinger; Directed by Adrian Lyne
1986	The Clan of the Cave Bear	Executive Producer	
1984	Metropolis	Sales Agent	
1984	The NeverEnding Story	Executive Producer	Directed by Wolfgang Petersen
1981	Das Boot	Executive Producer	Directed by Wolfgang Petersen; Nominated for Six Academy Awards
1977	The Choirboys	Executive Producer	
1974	There Is No 13	George Thomas	
1974	The Arena	Producer	Starred Damon's future wife Margaret Markov
1973	Crypt of the Living Dead	Peter	
1973	The Devil's Wedding Night	Karl Schiller	
1973	Little Mother	Riano	
1972	Byleth: The Demon of Incest	Duke Lionello Shandwell	
1972	Great Treasure Hunt	Kansas Lee	
1972	I leoni di Pietroburgo	Eldar	
1972	Confessioni segrete di un convento di clausura	Domenico	
1972	They Call Him Veritas	Veritas	
1971	Long Live Robin Hood	Allen	
1971	Ivanhoe, the Norman Swordsman	Ivanhoe	
1971	Pistol Packin' Preacher	Slim	
1968	Dead Men Don't Count	Johnny Dalton	
1968	Anzio	Wally Richardson	Directed by Edward Dmytryk
1968	All Out	Johnny	
1968	The Young, the Evil and the Savage	Richard Barrett	
1968	Train for Durango	Brown	
1967	Golden Chameleon	Vittorio	
1967	No Killing Without Dollars	Laurence	
1967	Requiescant	George Ferguson	Also starring Pier Paolo Pasolini
1966	Johnny Yuma	Johnny Yuma	
1966	Ringo and His Golden Pistol	Johnny Oro/Ringo	aka Johnny Oro, directed by Sergio Corbucci
1966	Dio, Come Ti Amo!	Luis	Also starring Gigliola Cinquetti, 2 times the Festival of San Remo winner.
1965	Secret Agent 777	Dr. Bardin	
1964	Son of Cleopatra	El Kebir	
1964	100 Horsemen	Don Fernando Herrera y Menendez	
1963	The Tyrant of Castile	Peter I: King of Castile	
1963	Black Sabbath	Vladimire d'Urfe	Also starring Boris Karloff; Directed by Mario Bava
1963	The Shortest Day	Un ufficiale austriaco	Directed by Sergio Corbucci
1963	The Young Racers	Stephen Children	Directed by Roger Corman
1962	The Reluctant Saint	Aldo	Directed by Edward Dmytryk
1962	The Longest Day	Private Harris	Also starring Richard Burton and Sean Connery, Uncredited
1962	Beauty and the Beast	Eduardo	
1962	Peccati d'estate	Dr. Gianni Orgei	
1960	House of Usher	Philip Winthrop	Won Golden Globe Award for Most Promising Newcomer; Also starring Vincent Price; Directed by Roger Corman; Screenplay by Richard Matheson
1960	This Rebel Breed	Frank Serano	
1958	The Party Crashers	Twig Webster	
1958	Life Begins at 17	Russ Lippincott	
1957	Young and Dangerous	Tommy Price	
1956	Alfred Hitchcock Presents	Ray Clements	Season 1 Episode 22: "Place of Shadows"
1956	Between Heaven and Hell	Private Terry, Company G	
1956	Screaming Eagles	Private Lambert	
1956	Inside Detroit	Gregg Linden	
