= Universal Soldier (1992 film) =

1992 film by Roland Emmerich

- Theatrical release poster
- Directed by: Roland Emmerich
- Written by: Richard Rothstein; Christopher Leitch; Dean Devlin
- Produced by: Allen Shapiro; Craig Baumgarten; Joel B. Michaels
- Starring: Jean-Claude Van Damme; Dolph Lundgren; Ally Walker; Ed O'Ross; Jerry Orbach
- Cinematography: Karl Walter Lindenlaub
- Edited by: Michael J. Duthie
- Music by: Christopher Franke
- Production companies: Carolco Pictures; Centropolis Entertainment; IndieProd Company Productions
- Distributed by: TriStar Pictures
- Release date: July 10, 1992
- Running time: 103 minutes
- Country: United States
- Language: English
- Budget: $23 million
- Box office: $120 million

Universal Soldier is a 1992 American military science-fiction action film directed by Roland Emmerich, produced by Allen Shapiro, Craig Baumgarten, and Joel B. Michaels, and written by Richard Rothstein, Christopher Leitch, and Dean Devlin. The film tells the story of Luc Deveraux, portrayed by Jean-Claude Van Damme, a former soldier killed in the Vietnam War in 1969, and returned to life by a secret military project called the "Universal Soldier" program.

Universal Soldier was released by TriStar Pictures on July 10, 1992. The film received negative reviews from critics and grossed $120 million worldwide against a budget of $23 million and spawned a series of films: theatrical sequel Universal Soldier: The Return, alternative direct-to-video sequel Universal Soldier: Regeneration, standalone direct-to-video film Universal Soldier: Day of Reckoning, and two direct-to-TV films, Universal Soldier II: Brothers in Arms and Universal Soldier III: Unfinished Business.

It was the first film on-screen collaboration between Van Damme and Lundgren in the film series, who later worked together in The Expendables 2 and Black Water, and their voice-roles in Minions: The Rise of Gru.

== Plot ==
In 1969, a U.S. Army team secures a village against North Vietnamese forces. Luc Deveraux discovers members of his squad and villagers murdered. Deveraux's sergeant, Andrew Scott, has gone insane and is holding a young couple hostage. Deveraux tries to reason with Scott, who executes the man and orders Deveraux to shoot the girl. Deveraux refuses, and Scott kills the girl with a grenade. After shooting each other to death, Deveraux and Scott's corpses are recovered by a second squad and cryogenically frozen, their disappearance classified as "missing in action".

Deveraux's and Scott's corpses, with others, are reanimated decades later for the "Universal Soldier" (UniSol) program, an elite counter-terrorism unit. They are given a neural serum to keep their minds susceptible and their memories suppressed. The team demonstrates its superior training and physical abilities against communist terrorists, but Deveraux regains memories from his former life upon seeing two hostages that resemble the Vietnamese villagers. Deveraux disobeys commands from the control team and becomes unresponsive.

In the mobile command center, the UniSols are revealed to be genetically augmented soldiers with enhanced self-healing abilities and superior strength, but they overheat and shut down. Because of the glitch, Woodward, one of the technicians on the project, suggests removing Deveraux from the team, but UniSol commander Colonel Perry refuses. TV journalist Veronica Roberts tries to get a story on the UniSol project. Roberts sneaks onto the base with a cameraman, discovering GR76 immersed in ice, still alive despite normally fatal injuries.

When Roberts is discovered, Deveraux and Scott are ordered to capture her dead or alive. She flees to her cameraman's car, but they crash. Scott murders the cameraman against orders. Deveraux rescues Roberts, and they escape in a UniSol vehicle. To protect the program, Colonel Perry sends the remaining UniSols to find Deveraux and Roberts.

Deveraux and Roberts flee to a motel, where Roberts discovers she has been framed for the murder of her cameraman. Deveraux collapses from overheating and has to take an ice bath. The UniSols destroy the motel, but Deveraux and Roberts hide in a bed until they leave. The couple flees in a stolen car to a gas station, where Deveraux has Roberts remove a tracking device from his leg. They set a trap and when the UniSols arrive the gas station explodes. Colonel Perry is ordered to terminate the mission, but Scott's insanity returns, and he kills Perry and all but two doctors. Deveraux and Roberts sneak onto the command center bus and steal UniSol documents. Scott orders the rest of the mindlessly obedient UniSol team to kill Deveraux and Roberts.

Using information from the stolen documents, Roberts contacts Dr. Christopher Gregor. Gregor informs them that the UniSol project was started in the 1960s to develop the perfect soldier. Although they were able to reanimate dead humans, they could not overcome the body's need for cooling. Another major problem is that memories of the last moments of life are greatly amplified; Scott believes he is still in Vietnam. When Deveraux and Roberts leave the doctor's home, police arrest them. Scott and GR76 ambush the police convoy. After a chase, the police bus and the UniSol truck both drive off a cliff in the Grand Canyon and explode, killing GR76. Deveraux and Roberts head to Deveraux's family farm in Louisiana.

After Deveraux is reunited with his parents, Scott appears and takes the family and Roberts hostage. Scott's use of muscle enhancers enables him to mercilessly beat Deveraux. Roberts escapes, only to be seemingly killed by a grenade thrown by Scott. Deveraux grabs the muscle enhancers Scott used and injects himself. Now evenly matched, Deveraux impales Scott on the spikes of a hay harvester and activates it, shredding Scott to pieces. Roberts, who survived the explosion, embraces Deveraux.

== Cast ==
- Jean-Claude Van Damme as Luc Deveraux / GR44
- Dolph Lundgren as Sergeant Andrew Scott / GR13
- Ally Walker as Veronica Roberts
- Ed O'Ross as Colonel Perry
- Leon Rippy as Woodward
- Tico Wells as Garth
- Ralf Moeller as GR76 (credited as Ralph Moeller)
- Robert Trebor as The Motel Owner
- Gene Davis as Lieutenant
- Drew Snyder as Charles
- Jerry Orbach as Dr. Christopher Gregor

== Production ==
Development began on the film in February 1990 under producer Craig Baumgarten with Andrew Davis initially hired to direct and co-write the screenplay. Development continued under Davis including overseeing Pre-production and location scouting in Mexico until February 1991 when Carolco Pictures executive Mario Kassar fired Davis due to concerns about the budget with the initial script calling for extensive computer-generated special effects to portray the elaborately designed glowing biomechanical cyborg designs. The project managed to avoid outright cancellation due to having Jean-Claude Van Damme and Dolph Lundgren secured for the leads. Vic Armstrong, the Stunt coordinator and second unit director for the film, also suggested that the rewrites under Davis that positioned the film more as a political thriller and away from being an action film may have played a role in Davis' departure. The producers were strongly considering assigning directing duties to Armstrong, however, upon viewing Moon 44, Kassar was impressed with director Roland Emmerich due to making such a nice looking movie on a budget of only $2.5 million that Kassar ended up hiring him to direct the film. Emmerich came on board in March of that year, and began rewriting the script with Dean Devlin such as simplifying the explanation for how the cyborgs operate to decrease the level of effects work needed.

Principal photography began in August 1991. Carolco, the company that produced the film, was having financial troubles and hoped the film's box-office return would keep them afloat.

== Release ==
=== Marketing ===
At the 1992 Cannes Film Festival, Van Damme and Lundgren were involved in a verbal altercation that almost turned physical. On his website, Lundgren confirmed it was a publicity stunt to promote the film. It was the last film that used the multichannel surround-sound format, Cinema Digital Sound.

=== Alternative ending ===
The Special Edition DVD release features an alternative ending, which starts shortly after Scott takes Deveraux's family and Roberts hostage. As Deveraux grabs a shotgun in the kitchen, the front door opens, and he sees his mother at the door before Scott shoots her to death. In the final fight between Deveraux and Scott, Deveraux does not use Scott's muscle enhancers. Shortly after grinding Scott to death, Deveraux is shot by his father before Dr. Christopher Gregor and his men appear.

Gregor explains that he used Deveraux to entrap both Scott and him, and that Deveraux was staying with people posing as his parents. He then has his men shoot Deveraux, but before Deveraux dies, the police and Roberts' news crew arrive. The news crew douses Deveraux with a fire extinguisher to stabilize him while Dr. Gregor and his men are arrested. Roberts is given the microphone to cover the arrest, but she loses all composure while on the air, dropping the microphone to comfort Deveraux.

Several days later, Deveraux is reunited with his real parents. The film ends with a eulogy narrated by Roberts, who explains that Deveraux rejected all life-prolonging medication before dying a natural death.

== Reception ==
=== Box office ===
Universal Soldier opened in theaters on July 10, 1992, where it grossed $10,057,084 from 1916 theaters with a $5,249 per screen average. It opened and peaked at number two, behind A League of Their Own's second weekend. Grossing $37,299,898 in the US and Canada and $82.9 million internationally ($45 million via TriStar), for a worldwide gross of $120 million.

=== Critical response ===
Mainstream critics dismissed it as a Terminator 2 clone, or as a typical, mindless action film. On the review aggregator website Rotten Tomatoes, 34% of 35 critics' reviews are positive, with an average rating of 4.5/10. The website's consensus reads: "Universal Soldier unites a pair of veteran action stars behind a potentially intriguing premise, but on this battlefield, entertainment value is largely AWOL." Metacritic, which uses a weighted average, assigned the film a score of 35 out of 100, based on 15 critics, indicating "generally unfavorable" reviews. Audiences polled by CinemaScore gave the film an average grade of "B" on an A+ to F scale.

In a retrospective review, Drew Taylor from IndieWire said: "This movie rules. The introduction of the Emmerich/Devlin double-team, this high concept, moderately budgeted sci-fi action movie is a bouillabaisse of clichés that somehow manages to be a charming, funny, often positively thrilling B-grade treat".

== Franchise ==
=== Sequels ===
The two direct-to-TV sequels, Universal Soldier II: Brothers in Arms and Universal Soldier III: Unfinished Business were released in 1998, with Matt Battaglia cast as the titular character. A theatrical sequel Universal Soldier: The Return (which ignores the two television sequels) was released in 1999, with Van Damme reprising the role and Michael Jai White cast as another role for the film. Meanwhile, the alternative sequels, Universal Soldier: Regeneration and Universal Soldier: Day of Reckoning, were released in 2009 and 2012, respectively, with Van Damme and Lundgren reprising their roles from the first film, ignoring the events of Universal Soldier: The Return.

=== Reboot ===
A reboot was in development and Richard Wenk was set to write the film as of October 2018, which would've focused on one resurrected soldier.

=== Television series ===
In October 2011, writer Damien Kindler was set to write a TV series of the same name for FremantleMedia North America with producers from the original film Allen Shapiro and Craig Baumgarten attached to the project.

== Other media ==
=== Comics ===
NOW Comics published a three-part comic miniseries based on the movie, running from September to November 1992. The adaptation was written by Clint McElroy.

=== Video game ===
During conversion of the video game Turrican 2 to the Sega Genesis, the publisher, Accolade, decided to cash in on the hype surrounding the film and rebrand the game as a tie-in. The spaceship levels from the original were replaced with "platforming" levels set in a jungle, and the player sprite and some enemies were changed to look more human. The resulting product received mostly negative reviews compared to the critically acclaimed home-computer release. A version of the game for the Game Boy was also released, while a Super Nintendo Entertainment System port was developed, but never released.
