= Joshua Tree (1993 film) =

1993 American action film by Vic Armstrong

- Promotional release poster
- Directed by: Vic Armstrong
- Written by: Steven Pressfield
- Produced by: Illana Diamant; Andy Armstrong; Yoram Barzilai
- Starring: Dolph Lundgren; George Segal; Kristian Alfonso; Geoffrey Lewis; Beau Starr; Michelle Phillips
- Cinematography: Daniel L. Turrett
- Edited by: Paul Morton
- Music by: Joel Goldsmith
- Production companies: Epic Productions; Horned Toad Productions; Stone Group Pictures; Zilex Pictures N.V.
- Distributed by: LIVE Home Video
- Release dates: March 27, 1993 (Japan); October 19, 1994 (US)
- Running time: 106 minutes
- Country: United States
- Language: English

Joshua Tree (released under the alternative title Army of One) is a 1993 American action film directed by Vic Armstrong, written by Steven Pressfield and starring Dolph Lundgren, Kristian Alfonso, and George Segal. Much of the film was filmed in Los Angeles, Lone Pine, Agua Dulce, and Joshua Tree National Park in Southern California. The climax was shot in the Cottonwood Canyon region of the Sierra Nevada mountain range.

== Plot ==
Wellman Anthony Santee is a former race car driver who has turned to a life of crime since the death of his mother. Santee and his friend Eddie Turner bend the law for profit by hauling exotic stolen cars.

Santee's latest assignment is to transport such goods across the desert, but a highway patrol officer pulls him over. The officer notices that Turner carries a gun hidden behind his back and prepares to arrest him, when suddenly a pair of cops named Frank Severance and Jack "Rudy" Rudisill arrive. After a brief gun battle, Eddie and the officer are killed, and Santee is left wounded.

After recovering in a prison hospital, Santee escapes during transfer to the fictional San Gorgonio Penitentiary after correctly sensing that his guards intend to murder him. Wounded and on the run, Santee abducts Rita Marrick from a nearby gas station, unaware that she is a police officer.

Rita's partner Michael Agnos leads the search for Santee and Rita. As Santee eludes capture with the help of Eddie's widow and child, Severance and Rudisill continue their investigation. Rita's attempt to escape, which forces Santee to violently disable nearby police officers (as opposed to kill) causes her to begin to doubt Santee's guilt.

Santee releases Rita and invades Severance's home, forcing his wife, Esther, to provide the phone number of former associate Jimmy Shoeshine, from whom he demands payments due to him and Eddie. There Santee is rejoined by Rita, who finds evidence in the house supporting his claims, and they escape, barely evading gun blasts from Esther and a highway patrolman.

At Shoeshine's warehouse, Santee handcuffs Rita out of harm's way and in a firefight, he decimates Shoeshine's lethal mechanics. After he coercively retrieves the money from Shoeshine, Showshine is able to escape due to the timely arrival of Severance and Rudisill. It is revealed in a series of flashbacks, that Severance and Rudisill are the leaders of Shoeshine's car smuggling ring and that they killed the patrolman, and Eddie, to safeguard their involvement. Subsequently, the pair murder both Jimmy, who has responded to the firefight and Michael, for knowing too much. Rita, devastated after witnessing Michael's death, joins Santee in a desperate race for life. As Severance and Rudisill close in, a crime scene officer discovers a surveillance tape that recorded Severance killing Michael.

Severance and Rudisill, having pursued Santee and Rita, confront the outlaw couple on a cliff face, after a prolonged car chase. Santee kills Rudisill, avenging Eddie, as he points a gun at a wounded Rita, and engages Severance in a hand-to-hand brawl. Just as Santee overpowers and prepares to execute Severance, the police arrive. They separate Santee from Severance and Severance is arrested and taken away. Later, a wounded Santee is vindicated through Rita. After these events, Santee and Rita kiss each other as the police arrest for again, this time for permit for release after his innocence was proven before returning to his life.

== Cast ==
- Dolph Lundgren as Wellman Anthony Santee
- Kristian Alfonso as Deputy Rita Marrick
- Matt Battaglia as Deputy Michael Agnos
- George Segal as Lieutenant Franklin L. Severance
- Michael Paul Chan as Jimmy "Shoeshine"
- Beau Starr as Detective Jack "Rudy" Rudisill
- Geoffrey Lewis as Sheriff Cepeda
- Michelle Phillips as Esther Severance
- Nick Chinlund as Deputy Tomay
- Bert Remsen as Woody Engstrom
- Ken Foree as Eddie Turner
- Khandi Alexander as Maralena Turner
- Marcus Brown as E.G. Turner
- Rondi Reed as Detective Chelsey
- Edward Stone as Detective Jordan
- Jason Ross-Azikiwe as Officer Macher
- Charlie Holliday as Officer Hines
- Jophery Brown as Snoozing Cop

== Production ==
=== Title change ===
When the film was released on VHS and laserdisc in the United States (last territory worldwide) in the fall 1994, the distributor Live Entertainment changed the title to Army of One to prevent confusion with The Joshua Tree, the 1987 album by U2. Until February 2013, with the release of the Blu-ray from Shout Factory the film had never been released in the US under its original title or in the correct aspect ratio, a delay of nearly 20 years.

=== Widescreen availability ===
Joshua Tree was filmed in Super 35 with a printed aspect ratio of 2.39:1 (a.k.a., 2.35). Naturally VHS releases of the time only showed the film in a pan and scan (European markets) and open matte release. Until 2013 (when Shout released the movie on Blu-ray), the film had not been released in the United States in its original aspect ratio, though it was available on DVD in anamorphic widescreen in France (where it had been released theatrically). That version was dubbed in French, however, with no original language audio track.

Shout! Factory acquired the U.S. home video rights and set a Blu-ray/DVD combo pack release for February 26, 2013.

=== Homages ===
When resting in a sleazy motel, Santee watches Raoul Walsh's High Sierra on TV. Rita notices him watching with interest and draws parallels between Santee and Humphrey Bogart's character as the 'hero who goes down with all guns blazing'. Joshua Tree was also filmed around many of the same locations as High Sierra, such as the Alabama Hills near Lone Pine, California.

Joshua Tree also contains clear references and homages to Sam Peckinpah's The Getaway starring Steve McQueen and Ali MacGraw (the shoot at the grocery store and the cop cars at the bus station), as well John Woo's A Better Tomorrow, The Killer (and possibly Hard Boiled but it had not been officially released when the movie was in production) (the garage shoot out). When director Vic Armstrong apologized to Woo for copying him the Hong Kong director replied "Don't worry Vic, I've been stealing your ideas for years!"

Another film reference is the 1973 cult classic Electra Glide in Blue directed by James William Guercio.

== Music ==
The film's score was composed by Joel Goldsmith. To date, the score has not been released on CD.

== Release ==
=== Censorship ===
Although not listed as cut by the BBFC, the 1994 UK VHS release was missing a large amount of violence from the film. Despite still being given the 18-rating, almost every blood squib, entrance wound, exit wound, moments of excessive gunfire, mutilations and graphic death had been removed or edited from the film. This is especially evident in the scene where Santee is involved in a chop shop warehouse gun battle with dozens of Chinese mafioso as the music jumps all over the place and characters seemingly warp from one side of the set to the other. The UK VHS has been out of print for a number of years and there is no DVD release there.

The French Region 2 DVD runs two minutes shorter than the uncut theatrical release and VHS; two scenes in which Rita lights a cigarette are cut and the love scene between her and Santee is shortened. This edition is believed to be mistakenly made from a master originally made and edited for French TV channel TF1.

=== Two different endings ===
According to the December 1993 issue of Impact, "The producers felt that the final showdown in Vic Armstrong's directorial debut didn't live up to the stunts that had preceded it, and asked for a reshoot."

The original ending has Santee shoot Rudy with the Uzi from the top of the ridge many times. Severance grabs Rita and tells him to give it up. Santee appears and says "I'm here, Severence. Let her go!" before stumbling down the ridge. But Severance overpowers him and kicks him off the edge of a cliff by stomping on his bloodied hands. As Severance is about to kill Rita he and Santee fight over a revolver. Rudy is still alive and they both shoot him before Santee pulverizes Severance with his fists. Just as he is about to crush his head with a boulder Santee says "This is for Eddie", which is followed by a brief black and white flashback. Severance says "Go ahead, kid. I'd do it to you" before Santee is interrupted by the police. Severance is then arrested by Sheriff Cepeda (Geoffrey Lewis) who claims he has seen the CCTV footage of him murdering Deputy Agnos back at Jimmy Shoeshine's (Michael Paul Chan) warehouse. There is a denouement in which Santee is back at his father's ranch with Rita (now wearing her police uniform). He mentions the fate of Eddie's wife and son before kissing Rita goodbye.

The second ending, released theatrically in France and available on the unrated Artisan Entertainment DVD and the French region 2 DVD has an extra fight scene between Santee, Severance and Rudy. Santee only shoots Rudy from the ridge once and Rudy is knocked out as he hits his head on a rock. Santee's descent from the ridge is shorter. His fight with Severance is exactly the same but as he kicks Santee of the cliff his hand does not have as much blood on it as it did before. Immediately after landing on a ledge Santee starts climbing back up the cliff. Severance teases Rita about killing her but is interrupted by Santee, who is then interrupted by Rudy holding an AK-47 to his head. Santee gives up and is beaten down by Rudy and Severance. Just as they are about to kill him Rita intervenes and claims that if they do, they will never get the money he took from Jimmy Shoeshine. Even though the suitcase is hidden under a low railroad bridge elsewhere, Santee pretends it is hidden nearby. This gives him a chance to get the upper-hand over Severance and Rudy and bushwhacks them. All three of them fight but Severance is the first to run off as it is clear he is losing. Rita then beats him with a stick. Santee and Rudy are still fighting but he gets Rudy in a headlock. Rudy's last words before Santee breaks his neck are "Eddie was just a nigger." With Rudy dead Santee rushes back to Severance to stop him from hurting Rita. He pulverizes him and is about to finish him off with a boulder but there is no flashback and no mention of Eddie. The cops arrive and Severance is cuffed by Cepeda.

== Reception ==
=== Critical response ===
TV Guide stated in its average 2/4 star review (which labeled it under its second film title): "Brimming with muscular martial artistry, energetically staged pursuit sequences, and a full quota of bullet barrages, ARMY OF ONE suffers mainly from over-length. Still, action aficionados will be too busy body-counting the bad guys to notice any of this proficient revenge drama's deficiencies... carries a lot more dramatic resonance than less thoughtfully-scripted fugitive movies."
