= Cyber Bandits =

1995 film by Erik Fleming

- Film poster
- Directed by: Erik Fleming
- Written by: James Robinson; James Goldman (credited as Winston Beard)
- Produced by: Paul Colichman; Lilli Rouleau; Miles A. Copeland III; Lila Cazès
- Starring: Martin Kemp; Alexandra Paul; Adam Ant; Grace Jones; Robert Hays
- Cinematography: Denis Maloney
- Edited by: Rebecca Ross
- Music by: Tom Hiel; Steve Hunter
- Production companies: Lumiere Pictures; IRS Media
- Distributed by: Columbia TriStar
- Release date: 1995
- Running time: 86 minutes
- Language: English

Cyber Bandits, also known as A Sailor’s Tattoo, is a 1995 science fiction film directed by Erik Fleming. It uses a screenplay by James Robinson and James Goldman (credited as Winston Beard). It was made by Lumiere Pictures and used visual effects by Steven Robiner.

The film stars Martin Kemp as the ship captain Jack Morris who unwittingly gets entangled into a dangerous adventure when he transports passengers who have created a lethal virtual reality weapon. Others in the cast included Alexandra Paul, Robert Hays, Adam Ant, Grace Jones, Kiana Tom, and Rowan & Martin's Laugh-In regular Henry Gibson. It was distributed by Columbia TriStar and released on DVD in December 2004. It received an R rating from the Motion Picture Association of America for violence and profanity.

== Synopsis ==
When Jack Morris accepts a job to serve as a navigator aboard a yacht owned by millionaire Morgan, he's unaware that this will place him in the middle of a deadly entanglement. Morgan's mistress, Rebecca Snow, has stolen his most recent and deadly invention, the computer code for a weapon capable of erasing a target's brain and leaving them trapped within their own body. In order to force his help, Rebecca tattoos the code onto Jack's skin, making him a target for any and everyone who wants to obtain the code.

== Cast ==
- Martin Kemp as Jack Morris
- Alexandra Paul as Rebecca Snow
- Adam Ant as Manny
- Grace Jones as Masako Yokohama
- Henry Gibson as Dr. Knutsen
- James Hong as Tojo Yokohama
- Robert Hays as Morgan
- Kiana Tom as Anastasia
- Christopher Douglas as Daniel
- Jason Stuart as Street vendor

== Production ==
Jones wore her own clothes to portray the character.

== Release ==
Cyber Bandits was released direct to video during November 1995, through Columbia TriStar.

== Reception ==
Film critics Mick Martin and Marsha Porter dismissed the film as a "farfetched action outing that uses high technology as camouflage for its own lack of invention." Another commentator stated: "Fleming directs it like nothing is out of the ordinary about these bizarre characters and crazy situations." Entertainment Weekly indicated that Kemp struggled with and ultimately failed in employing an American accent, and criticized the film for its ignorance of technology in what was supposed to be a plot involving technology of the future.
