= Kiana Tom =

American television host, author, actress, and businesswoman

- Born: Hawaii, United States
- Occupations: Personal trainer Group fitness instructor Entrepreneur; Model; Actress
- Years active: 1991–2002
- Known for: Host of Kiana's Flex Appeal
- Spouse: Dennis Breshears (m. 2002; div. 2022)
- Children: 2
- Website: www.kiana.com

Kiana Tom is an American former television host known for hosting Kiana's Flex Appeal on ESPN.

== Career ==
In 1994, Tom published Kiana's Body Sculpting through Macmillan Publishers; the following year she began hosting her own fitness series on ESPN, Kiana's Flex Appeal. Tom was also a cheerleader with the Los Angeles Raiderettes, affiliated with the Los Angeles Raiders of the National Football League. In 1995, Tom made her acting debut in a cameo role in the straight-to-video Cyber Bandits, followed by a role in the 1999 film Universal Soldier: The Return. She also appeared in a cameo appearance with Eminem in the music video for "Without Me."

Tom posed nude for the May 2002 edition of Playboy magazine.

== Filmography ==
Year	Title	Role	Notes
1995	Cyber Bandits	Anastasia	Direct-to-video
1998	The Drew Carey Show	Tia	Episode: Two Weddings and a Funeral for a Refrigerator
1999	Universal Soldier: The Return	Maggie	
2001	Family Law	Robin Unger	Episode: Film at Eleven
2002	Without Me	Herself	Music Video
