= Universal Soldier: Day of Reckoning =

2012 film by John Hyams

- Theatrical release poster
- Directed by: John Hyams
- Written by: John Hyams; Doug Magnuson; Jon Greenlagh
- Produced by: Craig Baumgarten; Moshe Diamant; Allen Shapiro; Courtney Solomon
- Starring: Scott Adkins; Jean-Claude Van Damme; Dolph Lundgren; Andrei Arlovski
- Cinematography: Yaron Levy
- Edited by: Andrew Drazek; John Hyams
- Music by: Wil Hendricks; Michael Krassner; Robin Vining
- Production companies: BMP Productions; Signature Entertainment
- Distributed by: Foresight Unlimited; Magnet Releasing
- Release dates: August 23, 2012 (Hamburg Fantasy Film Festival); October 25, 2012 (Video on Demand)
- Running time: 114 minutes
- Country: United States
- Language: English
- Budget: $8 million
- Box office: $1.4 million

Universal Soldier: Day of Reckoning is a 2012 American science fiction action film directed by John Hyams, who co-edited with Andrew Drazek, and wrote the screenplay with Doug Magnuson and Jon Greenlagh. It stars Scott Adkins with Jean-Claude Van Damme and Dolph Lundgren, who both reprise their roles from the first film, alongside newcomer Andrei Arlovski. It is the sixth and final installment in the Universal Soldier film series.

The film acts as a sequel to 2009's Universal Soldier: Regeneration, unrelated to the two television sequels and ignoring the events of the 1999 theatrical sequel Universal Soldier: The Return. In the film, former military man John awakens from a coma and finds out his wife and daughter have been murdered in a home invasion. John goes on a personal vendetta against the man behind the killings, revealed to be Luc Deveraux, the eponymous Universal Soldier from the previous films who has now become a powerful terrorist military leader.

It received mixed reviews, with criticism for its violence, while others praised its direction, action, and atmosphere. It was first released to video-on-demand in the United States before receiving a theatrical release on November 30, 2012. The film grossed $1.4 million against a production budget of $8 million. A reboot of the series has been in development since 2018.

== Plot ==
A man is in a hospital bed (John) distressed from dreaming intruders in his house brutally assault him, then watching as the leader shoots his wife and child dead.

John awakens from a many-months coma to learn that his wife and daughter were brutally murdered in a home invasion. Questioned by FBI Agent Gorman, the still amnesiac John identifies the perpetrator who killed his family.

The FBI agent tells John the man is former Universal Soldier (UniSol) Luc Deveraux, now a wanted man. On leaving the hospital room, Agent Gorman makes a call on his phone and give an order to activate "the plumber," a sleeper agent named Magnus, a cloned Next Generation UniSol. (Note: As depicted in Universal Soldier: Regeneration (2009).)

Magnus goes to a brothel where he slaughters the female employees and most of the male patrons, who all display exceptional physical abilities, but are no match for Magnus. His final adversary, a clone of UniSol Andrew Scott, overpowers Magnus and injects him with a serum that frees him from government control.

Magnus is then introduced to a separatist group led by Deveraux and Scott, who are taking in wayward UniSols to turn them against the U.S. government, with the ultimate goal of establishing a UniSol-led new order.

John receives a call from someone claiming to be his friend Isaac, who asks John to meet. At his house, John finds Isaac long dead and sees evidence of his involvement with the UniSol program. A matchbox leads John to a strip club, where he is recognized by a stripper named Sarah, whom he cannot remember.

Magnus injects John with Scott's serum, whereupon John hallucinates about Deveraux but retains his will. John follows Sarah to her apartment, where they are again attacked by Magnus. In the fight, John loses some phalanges, but they escape. Sarah tells John she remembers him working as a truck driver, living in a riverside cabin and that the two were romantically involved.

Calling his own memories into question, John meets with Agent Gorman. He learns Deveraux was often seen at the docks from where John used to take shipments. John goes to the docks and inspects cargo awaiting shipment. There, he meets with local manager Ron Castellano, who plays hidden camera footage that shows John brutally murdering Isaac.

As John and Sarah drive towards the cabin, they are once more intercepted by Magnus. In the ensuing fight, John realizes he possesses superior physical strength and fighting ability, which enable John to finally kill Magnus. John also now sees his severed fingers have regrown.

John and Sarah reach the cabin to find it inhabited by an exact duplicate of John, who claims he is the original John. This is the "John" whom Sarah and Castellano recall, and is the John who killed Isaac.

The original "John" had been mind-controlled into hunting down Deveraux, but was turned and hired as a transporter and assassin for Deveraux's organization; but only until John met Sarah and deserted Deveraux. He tries to kill Sarah but is shot dead by the other John, who now suspects himself to be a sleeper UniSol.

After sending Sarah away, John meets a rogue UniSol at the river, who takes John to the separatists' secret underground headquarters. There, John is greeted by a Dr. Su, a former scientist of the UniSol program.

Dr. Su reveals to John he had been synthetically created a few weeks earlier and as such his family is nothing more than an implanted memory. Dr. Su also says the missing shipment contains hardware that will enable Deveraux to create clones.

John accepts Su's offer to surgically sever his emotional bond with the fake memories of his family, but the pain and attachment to those memories drive John insane. He kills every UniSol in his path, culminating with Andrew Scott in a one-on-one confrontation.

John reaches Deveraux himself; in the ensuing fight, Deveraux eventually gains the upper hand. Realizing the government will not stop sending John clones until he is dead, and seeing this John as a worthy successor, Deveraux allows John to kill him.

Later, John meets with FBI Agent Gorman again. Gorman admits to his involvement with the UniSol program and that he had purposefully put an unaware John on Deveraux's trail. Gorman ascribes John's success to his familial attachment, as opposed to the patriotism implanted in his predecessors.

John shoots Agent Gorman dead, before a clone of Gorman and three UniSols emerge from John's van. The clone leaves in Gorman's car, hinting that John has completed the cloning process and taken over the separatist group, now determined to infiltrate the government which he holds responsible for his pain.

== Cast ==
- Scott Adkins as John
- Jean-Claude Van Damme as Private Luc Deveraux
- Dolph Lundgren as Sergeant Andrew Scott
- Andrei Arlovski as Magnus
- Mariah Bonner as Sarah
- Tony Jarreau as Bouncer
- Craig Walker as Earl
- Andrew Sikking as Larry
- James Dumont as Dr. Brady
- David Jensen as Dr. Su
- Audrey P. Scott as Emma
- Rus Blackwell as Agent Gorman
- Dane Rhodes as Ron Castellano
- Susan Mansur as Madame
- Kristopher Van Varenberg as Miles
- Sigal Diamant as Claudia
- Juli Erickson as Woman
- Michelle Jones as Kathryn
- Roy Jones Jr. as Mess Hall Unisol
- Dustin Taylor as Bystander

== Production ==
Universal Soldier: A New Dimension (as it was initially titled) was to be the first in the series filmed in 3-D. John Hyams, who had directed Universal Soldier: Regeneration, returned as director along with Jean-Claude Van Damme and Dolph Lundgren. Hyams cited films such as Apocalypse Now, The Manchurian Candidate, Chinatown, and Invasion of the Body Snatchers as inspirations.

When first submitted to the MPAA, the film received an NC-17 rating due to its violence. An edited R-rated version was released in theaters. The NC-17 director's cut has been released overseas.

Michael Jai White, who previously appeared in the first two Universal Soldier films, joined the cast along with Van Damme and Lundgren, but ultimately dropped out.

== Release ==
Universal Soldier: Day of Reckoning premiered on VOD on October 25, 2012, followed by a theatrical run starting on November 30. The film premiered on HDNet Movies on November 28 the same year.

== Reception ==
=== Box office ===
The film was released in Russia and Malaysia on October 4 and grossed $624,724. The film opened a week later in Ukraine and ended up grossing $31,349. It was released on November 30, 2012, in the United States in three screens, grossing $3,181 in its opening weekend, and as of the December 6, the film has grossed $4,928. It opened on the same day in Turkey, finishing 8th with $75,919 for the weekend, as of the December 9, the film has grossed $138,232 in Turkey. The film was released in the United Arab Emirates and as of the December 9 it grossed $193,274. The worldwide total as of the December 12 is $992,507.

=== Critical response ===
On review aggregation website Rotten Tomatoes, the film has a 57% rating based on reviews from 51 critics, with an average rating of 5.6/10. The site's critical consensus reads: "The mooted final installment in the long-running series is a hyper-violent, often grim throwback to action movies of yore – which will appeal to some audiences just as emphatically as it deters others". On Metacritic it has a score of 58% based on reviews from 18 critics, indicating "mixed or average" reviews.

Negative reviews tended to focus on the film's violence, which was considered excessive. Clark Collis of Entertainment Weekly stated that the film "is so gruelingly violent you half wonder if director John Hyams' goal is to make the audience get up and leave the theater rather than be party to the brutality". Scott Bowles of USA Today criticized the film for being "so mean-spirited and joyfully violent" that it leans toward the torture porn genre. Elizabeth Weitzman of the New York Daily News wrote that unprepared viewers are "bound to leave shellshocked. Not just because of the movie's brutal violence, but from the stunning realization that this grim franchise will never stop regenerating itself".

Positive reviews suggested that Day of Reckoning successfully tweaked the series formula by introducing more horror and surreal elements. Nick Antosca of The Paris Review wrote that Day of Reckoning is "less an action film than a horror film", likening it to the films of David Lynch and early David Cronenberg and describing it as "strange, haunting, sometimes even beautiful odyssey that lingered with me more than any American movie in recent memory". He concluded that it was his "favorite movie of last year–the best movie of [2012], I would argue". Eric Kohn of IndieWire shared this sentiment, declaring it to be one of 2012's best action films: "Hyams delivers a remarkably satisfying action-thriller hybrid that constantly pushes ahead". Film critic Matt Zoller Seitz praised the film for its "elegant, committed action direction" and said that "it just radiates menace". He went on to say that the Universal Soldier film series "is a rare series that takes more creative risks as it goes along". Bilge Ebiri, writing for the website Vulture, praised the introduction, comparing it to a Michael Haneke film, saying that "the entire thing has a mesmeric, unreal quality, where things can turn on a dime, and often do". Ebiri wrote that "if more action movies were like Universal Soldier: Day of Reckoning, the world would probably be a better place".

== Reboot ==
A reboot was in development and Richard Wenk was set to write the film as of October 2018, which would focus on one resurrected soldier.
