= Luc Deveraux =

Fictional character

- Universal Soldier character
- Jean-Claude Van Damme as Luc Deveraux in the original Universal Soldier (1992).
- First appearance: Universal Soldier
- Last appearance: Universal Soldier: Day of Reckoning
- Created by: Richard Rothstein; Christopher Leitch; Dean Devlin
- Portrayed by: Jean-Claude Van Damme; Matt Battaglia

Luc Deveraux is the title character and protagonist of the Universal Soldier film series. He is most famously portrayed by Belgian actor and martial artist Jean-Claude Van Damme in Universal Soldier (1992) and its sequels, Universal Soldier: The Return (1999), Universal Soldier: Regeneration (2009) and Universal Soldier: Day of Reckoning (2012). The character is also portrayed by Matt Battaglia in the 1998 direct-to-video sequels Universal Soldier II: Brothers in Arms and Universal Soldier III: Unfinished Business.

He first appeared in Universal Soldier as "GR44" - depicted as a deceased Vietnam War soldier, who is reanimated in a secret government project to become a Universal Soldier or UniSol. He and other UniSols serve as remote-controlled superhuman soldiers sent into the most dangerous situations.

A recurring theme in the series is that he is the only UniSol strong enough to actively resist his mental conditioning and become more human. However, a return to normal functioning seems almost impossible.

In a twist to the usual format of the series, Deveraux serves as the main antagonist in the final entry, Day of Reckoning.

== Fictional character biography ==
=== Early life ===
Devereaux was born to Cajun parents and raised in a farm in Meraux in Louisiana. Most of the details of his childhood are left unexplained in the movie, though it is reasonable to surmise that he was born around or before 1947, making him at least 20 when he is deployed to Vietnam.

=== Universal Soldier (1992) ===
Set in 1969 in Vietnam, Luc Deveraux is nearing the end of his tour of duty in Vietnam. Luc's comrade, Sergeant Andrew Scott, goes insane and begins killing Vietnamese civilians and fellow American soldiers indiscriminately. After attempting to reason with Scott, Luc attempts to stop him from killing two villagers, resulting in the two soldiers shooting each other to death. Their bodies are recovered from the field and put on ice, and they are falsely listed as "missing in action".

Twenty-three years later, in 1992, the U.S. government commissioned the Black Tower, or "Universal Soldier" program. Luc's and Andrew's bodies are chosen to be reanimated as UniSols. When he meets Veronica Roberts, a TV journalist who manages to break his conditioning, Luc rebels. As a result of being essentially brain-dead for over twenty years, Luc cannot properly function in civilization. The two attempt to find the source of the Black Tower program and help Luc regain his identity, while Scott and other UniSols are sent to kill them. In the end, he learns about the origin of the program and regains his memories. When he returns to Louisiana, his aged parents are overjoyed to see him. However, their reunion is cut short when Scott appears, taking Roberts and Luc's parents hostage. Luc and Andrew fight to the death, which ends as Luc impales Scott on the spikes of a hay harvester and eviscerates him with it.

=== Universal Soldier II: Brothers in Arms (1998) ===
Set sometime after the events of the original film, (Note: As depicted in Universal Soldier (1992).) the budget for the Universal Soldier program has been slashed by the government, but a CIA director known as Mentor, orders the gang of mercenaries to take control of the new line of UniSols, to use them to smuggle diamonds to the highest foreign buyer. Meanwhile, Luc Deveraux and Veronica Roberts hide in his parents' farm. The UniSol controllers then activate a homing beacon embedded inside Luc's body that makes him return to the UniSol base in Chicago where his memory is reprogrammed. Veronica follows and while sneaking into the UniSol lab to rescue Luc, she discovers that his older brother Eric, a deceased soldier from Vietnam, is resurrected. When Luc is back to normal, he confronts other UniSols and his brother.

=== Universal Soldier III: Unfinished Business (1998) ===
Set soon after confrontation with UniSols, Luc and Veronica continue their attempts to expose the UniSol unit. After a hostage situation mistakenly leaves Veronica a fugitive, the two escape the city and go into hiding. Meanwhile, CIA director Mentor and Dr. Walker are in the process of creating a powerful UniSol clone of Luc's brother, Eric, to assassinate him and Veronica. Luc goes into confrontation with UniSol's clone and Mentor to shut down their operations.

Brothers in Arms and Unfinished Business were later ignored by the fourth film, The Return.

=== Universal Soldier: The Return (1999) ===
Set at least 15 years after Andrew Scott's death, (Note: As depicted in Universal Soldier (1992).) Devereaux is now a technical expert for the government. With his partner Maggie, he is attempting to refine and perfect the UniSol program in an effort to make a new, stronger breed of soldier – one more sophisticated, intelligent, and agile. Luc himself has had his UniSol augmentations reversed, rendering him fully human.

The new UniSols, codenamed UniSol 2500, which are faster and stronger than the original Unisols, are connected through an artificially intelligent computer system called SETH (an acronym for Self-Evolving Thought Helix). When SETH discovers that the UniSol program is scheduled to be shut down because of budget cuts, he defensively takes matters into his own "hands".

Killing those who try to switch him off, and unleashing his platoon of Universal Soldiers, led by the musclebound Romeo, SETH quickly takes control of the facility, but spares Devereaux, who has the secret code needed to deactivate a built-in fail-safe program which will otherwise shut SETH down in a matter of hours. With the help of Squid, a rogue cyberpunk, SETH takes human form.

Luc must also contend with the ambitious reporter Erin Young, and General Radford, who wants to take extreme measures to stop SETH. SETH gets Romeo to find Luc's 13-year-old daughter Hillary and kidnaps her, killing Maggie in the process.

Luc is the only person who can rescue Hillary and stop SETH, because he remains in possession of residual UniSol strength and powers as well as knowing firsthand how a UniSol thinks, feels, and fights. Luc infiltrates the UniSol building, where he finds Maggie, who is now revived as a UniSol. Luc and SETH fight hand-to-hand, before Luc freezes SETH with liquid nitrogen and shatters him.

Luc then battles Romeo, who gains the upper hand but Maggie stops him, having rebelled against the UniSols following SETH's demise. Maggie allows Luc to get himself and Hillary out of the building in time, but the bomb that General Radford had placed was deactivated by SETH before he was destroyed. As Romeo and the UniSols start to march out to declare war, Luc shoots the explosive charge, blowing up the building and killing all of the UniSols.

Because of the overwhelmingly negative reception toward The Return, subsequent films in the series ignore its events and often contradict them.

=== Universal Soldier: Regeneration (2009) ===
Set many years after the failure of the original UniSols, (Note: As depicted in Universal Soldier (1992).) the US Government replaces the Black Tower program with the White Tower program. Luc Deveraux is now decommissioned. He was originally part of a group that consisted of five UniSols and was by far the best of the group. In 2007, Dr. Sandra Fleming dealt with Deveraux so he could undergo rehabilitation therapy and rejoin society, and they both relocated to Switzerland. At the same time, the US Government shut down the White Tower program.

Deveraux forcibly returns to active duty by the US military to participate in a mission to rescue the Ukrainian prime minister's children, held hostage by renegade Commander Topov in the Chernobyl nuclear power plant, which is rigged with a time bomb. To combat the terrorists' secret weapon, a Next Generation UniSol (NGU), Deveraux reconditions, gears up and goes to the plant, where he slaughters most of the terrorist forces. He searches the buildings further and sees the children cornered by a clone of his nemesis Andrew Scott. Scott starts to have recollections of Deveraux telling him, "We have been through all this before". Scott charges towards the children with his knife, Deveraux attacks him, and a grueling fight ensues. In the end, Deveraux impales a lead pipe through Scott's head and fires a shotgun through it.

Deveraux then finds the children, but they are attacked by the NGU. Deveraux and the NGU then take the fight to the site of the bomb. Devereaux jams the detonator into the back of the NGU's uniform as they both jump out of the reactor chamber. The NGU pulls the detonator off his back just as it explodes, killing him. As the US military moves in, Deveraux leaves the power plant to start his campaign of freeing UniSols from the programming.

=== Universal Soldier: Day of Reckoning (2012) ===
Set years after defeating the NGU, (Note: As depicted in Universal Soldier: Regeneration (2009).) the US government replaces the White Tower program with a third Universal Soldier program. Luc Deveraux has been on the run from the military ever since the day he left the Chernobyl nuclear power plant and his hair is shaved off. Luc returns to the United States and lives in an underground bunker. Because Deveraux's existence is a political threat, he is targeted for termination by the US government. He enlists another clone of Andrew Scott, his former nemesis, to recruit other wayward UniSols, thus establishing a violent cult aiming at a new world order.

In the backstory of the film, the head of the Third Program puts Unisol sleeper agent "John" on Deveraux's trail. John eventually finds Deveraux, but fails to kill him. Instead, Deveraux frees John from government control and hires him to perform tasks for his separatist organization, such as assassinating key members of the new UniSol program and shipping stolen high tech equipment to his bunker. However, after becoming romantically involved with a woman, John deserts Deveraux and goes missing.

In the main story arc, the US government activates a clone of John, who differs from the original in that he is motivated by false memories of a happy family life, which ends when Deveraux murders his family and left him for dead. John is surreptitiously led to follow his predecessor's footsteps. As he learns about his own true nature, John eliminates a brainwashed UniSol that Scott had sent after him, and also finds and kills the original John. He then reaches Deveraux's underground bunker, killing Scott and most other UniSols present.

In the final confrontation with Deveraux himself, John II is nearly defeated, but realizing John's potential as his worthy successor, Deveraux concedes to him. John II finally kills Deveraux and takes over his organization, motivated by the grudge he harbors for the US government that caused his pain. John II then kills the FBI agent who had manipulated him into hunting down Deveraux and has him replaced with a clone, thus infiltrating the government and initiating the counterattack Deveraux had planned.

== Personality ==
In Universal Soldier, Devereaux begins as a Vietnam veteran tired of the war and wanting to go home. As the UniSol codenamed GR44 he is a mindless, coldly efficient killer. After breaking free from Army control, he displays considerable confusion and curiosity about the world, lacking basic social graces and showing almost childlike interest in many things. As the film progresses, he begins to regain his sense of humanity and shows a range of emotions.

Universal Soldier: Regeneration portrays Devereaux as an essentially broken man, part human, part UniSol. He is weary and confused, much as he was in the original film. His psychological testing portrays him as a man both desiring escape from, and haunted by, a past he barely remembers. Once recaptured by the military and conditioned for action, however, he becomes a killing machine once again.

Little of Devereaux is seen in Universal Soldier: Day of Reckoning; he is shown to still be weary and fatalistic, having accepted his lack of humanity.

== Powers and abilities ==
Like most UniSols, Devereaux displays considerable skill in hand-to-hand combat and proficiency with weapons. The most significant attribute of the UniSols is their resilience; they are capable of physical feats far beyond the capability of the strongest human and can withstand considerable physical punishment (whether from gunfire, stabbing, beatings, etc.). Serious injuries such as bone fractures and organ injury do not induce pain and only slightly affect flexibility. However, they are not invincible; explosives, bombs or corrosive agents, while still not especially dangerous, are the most effective weapons against them. Introduced later in the series is the transplanting of limbs, such as arms or legs, to replace damaged ones, with no ill effects.

What sets Devereaux apart from other UniSols (with the possible exception of Andrew Scott) is his latent human qualities. The average UniSol has no real intelligence or self-sufficiency, and only acts when ordered to do so. Once the government's control of him is interrupted, Devereaux is shown to be capable of thinking for himself and remembers bits and pieces of his past. He also regains basic human senses such as smell, touch, taste, and hearing. Regeneration implies that full rehabilitation is extremely difficult, if not impossible; though Devereaux makes considerable progress in the area of emotion, it is almost too easy for him to fall back into the relentless UniSol mentality.

== Merchandise ==
Luc Deveraux and Andrew Scott have been released as action figures in a customizable set including weapons. The figures have been well-received, with reviewers commending the extreme likeness to the characters and actors they are based on.
