= Jeff Woolnough =

Canadian film and television director

Jeff Woolnough is a Canadian/USA film and television director. His career began in the early 1990s and has won numerous awards directing multiple episodes of a variety of television series. His most prolific work has been with The Expanse and Vikings, for which he directed ten episodes of each.

He has been a three-time Canadian Screen Award nominee for Best Direction in a Drama Series for his work on Vikings, with nods at the 5th Canadian Screen Awards in 2017, the 6th Canadian Screen Awards in 2018, and the 7th Canadian Screen Awards in 2019. He was also a Gemini Award nominee for Best Direction in a Dramatic Program or Miniseries at the 25th Gemini Awards in 2010 for Keep Your Head Up, Kid: The Don Cherry Story.

== Directing credits ==
Year	Title	Episode(s)	Notes
1991	Dracula: The Series	"The Decline of the Romanian Vampire", "My Girlfriend's Back and There's Gonna Be Trouble"	
1991	Street Justice		
1992	Catwalk	No Returns	
1992-1993	African Skies	Wildlife (1992) Safety Last (1993) The Foul (1993) Smoke (1993) Aid and Comfort (1993)	
1993	Kung Fu: The Legend Continues	Shaman	
1993-1994	Cobra	Nowhere to Run (1993) Haunted Lives (1994)	
1994-1995	Hawkeye	The Quest (1994) Hester (1995)	
1994–1996	North of 60	The Cure (1994) Revolving Door (1995) Suspicious Minds (1996)	
1995-1997	Renegade	Liar's Poker (1995) Paradise Lost (1996) No Balls and Two Strikes (1996) Mr. Success (1996) Top Ten with a Bullet (1997)	
1994-1997	Silk Stalkings	Where There's a Will... (1994) The Lonely Hunter (1995) The Last Kiss Goodnight (1995) Sudden Death (1996) Pumped Up (1997)	
1997	Stargate SG-1	Emancipation	
1997	Once a Thief	Mac Daddy	
1997	Sleepwalkers		
1997	Earth: Final Conflict	Avatar Float Like a Butterfly	
1998	Universal Soldier II: Brothers in Arms		TV movie
1998	Pensacola: Wings of Gold	Boom	
1998	Universal Soldier III: Unfinished Business		TV movie
1998	Lost Souls		TV movie
1999	Power Play	Purple Hazing	
1997-1999	Sliders	Murder Most Foul (1997) The Other Slide of Darkness (1997) The Java Jive (1999)	
1997-2000	The Outer Limits	Dead Man's Switch (1997) Sarcophagus (1998) The Other Side (1999) The Human Operators (1999) The Gun (2000) The Beholder (2000)	
2000	The Man Who Used to Be Me		TV movie
2000	Freedom	Assassins	
2000	The Fearing Mind	Call of the Wild	
2001	The Invisible Man	Money for Nothing: Part 2	
2000-2001	Soul Food	The Watermelon Theory (2000) Come Back for the Comeback (2001)	
2001	Strange Frequency		
2001-2002	Dark Angel	The Kidz Are Aiight (2001) I and I Am a Camera (2001) Designate This (2001) Radar Love (2001) Medium Is the Message (2001) Hello, Goodbye (2002)	
2002	UC: Undercover	Teddy C	
2002	Strange Frequency 2		TV movie
2002	The Agency	French Kiss	
2002	Smallville	Red	
2002	Birds of Prey	Sins of the Mother	
2002	Taken a.k.a. "Steven Spielverg Presents Taken"	Dropping the Dishes	TV Mini Series
2003	Black Sash	Prime Suspect	
2003	Tru Calling	Past Tense	
2004	Dead Like Me	The Ledger	
2004-2005	NCIS	My Other Left Foot (2004) Missing (2004) Terminal Leave (2004) Caught on Tape (2005) Conspiracy Theory (2005)	
2005	Beach Girls		TV Mini Series
2005	Surface		
2005-2006	Battlestar Galactica	The Hand of God (2005) Home: Part 2 (2005) Downloaded (2006)	
2004-2006	Las Vegas	Games People Pay (2004) Bold, Beautiful & Blue (2005) Coyote Ugly (2006) Cash Springs Eternal (2006)	
2006	Eureka	Dr. Nobel (2006) H.O.U.S.E. Rules (2006)	
2006	The House Next Door		TV movie
2007	CSI: Crime Scene Investigation	Big Shots	
2007	Nobody		TV movie
2007-2010	Bones	The Killer in the Concrete (2007) Intern in the Incinerator (2007) The Santa in the Slush (2007) The Finger in the Nest (2008) Mayhem on a Cross (2009) The Foot in the Foreclosure (2009) The Rocker in the Rinse Cycle (2010)	
2008	Céline		TV movie
2008	Crusoe	Sacrifice High Water	
2009	Terminator: The Sarah Connor Chronicles	The Good Wound Ourselves Alone	
2009	Defying Gravity	Fear	
2009-2010	Being Erica	Til Death (2009) Everything She Wants (2009) Being Adam (2010) Erica, Interrupted (2010)	
2010	Keep Your Head Up, Kid: The Don Cherry Story	Part 1 Part 2	TV Mini Series
2010	Supernatural	Dark Side of the Moon	
2010	The Vampire Diaries	Kill or Be Killed	
2011	V	Uneasy Lies the Head	
2012	Wrath of Grapes: The Don Cherry Story II	Night One Night 2	TV Mini Series
2012	Copper	Surviving Death Husbands and Fathers La Tempête Arsenic and Old Cake	
2013	Jack		TV movie
2013–2014	Perception	Blindness (2013) Toxic (2013) Eternity (2014) Inconceivable (2014)	
2013-2015	Saving Hope	All Things Must Pass (2013) Vamonos (2013) Narrow Margin (2015)	
2014	Rookie Blue	Exit Strategy	
2014-2018	Vikings	Answers in Blood (2014) Unforgiven (2014) Warrior's Fate (2015) Scarred (2015) Death All 'Round (2016) The Last Ship (2016) The Great Army (2017) Revenge (2017) Full Moon (2018) The Joke (2018)	
2015	Backstrom	Bogeyman	
2015	Heroes Reborn	The Needs of the Many The Lion's Den	TV Mini Series
2015-2021	The Expanse	Remember the Cant (2015) CQB (2015) Static (2017) Godspeed (2017) Triple Point (2018) Immolation (2018) Oppressor (2019) Displacement (2019) Down and Out (2020) Tribes (2021)	
2016	Incorporated	Downsizing	
2018	Burden of Truth	Wake Up Call The Ties That Bind	
2018-2023	Riverdale	Chapter Thirty-Seven: Fortune and Men's Eyes (2018) Chapter Ninety-Eight: Mr-Cypher (2021) Chapter One Hundred and Seven: In the Fog (2022) Chapter One Hundred Twenty-Two: Tales in a Jugular Vein (2023)	
2018–2019	Cloak & Dagger	Back Breaker (2018) White Lines (2019)	
2018–2020	The Chilling Adventures of Sabrina	Chapter Eleven: A Midwinter's Tale (2018) Chapter Twenty-Nine: The Eldritch Dark (2020)	
2019	Runaways	Devil's Torture Chamber	
pre-production	Gold on Ice		
