= Beyond a Reasonable Doubt (2009 film) =

- Theatrical release poster
- Directed by: Peter Hyams
- Written by: Peter Hyams
- Based on: Beyond a Reasonable Doubt; 1956 film by Douglas Morrow
- Produced by: Mark Damon; Limor Diamant; Moshe Diamant; Ted Hartley
- Starring: Jesse Metcalfe; Amber Tamblyn; Michael Douglas; Joel David Moore; Orlando Jones
- Cinematography: Peter Hyams
- Edited by: Jeff Gullo
- Music by: David Shire
- Production companies: Foresight Unlimited; RKO Pictures; Autonomous Films; Signature Entertainment
- Distributed by: After Dark Films; Anchor Bay Films
- Release date: September 11, 2009; (U.S.)
- Running time: 106 minutes
- Country: United States
- Language: English
- Budget: $25 million
- Box office: $4.5 million (select markets)

Beyond a Reasonable Doubt is a 2009 American crime thriller film written, shot, and directed by Peter Hyams, starring Michael Douglas, Jesse Metcalfe and Amber Tamblyn. Based on Fritz Lang's 1956 film of the same name, it was Hyams' second reimagining of an RKO property after 1990's Narrow Margin. In it, a young journalist (Metcalfe) sets himself up as a murderer to expose the unethical practices of a star prosecutor with a trumped-up conviction record (Douglas), but finds himself unable to produce the evidence he had prepared to restore his innocence.

The film made its worldwide theatrical debut in Spain on July 11, 2009, and was given a limited release in the United States on September 11, 2009. It was negatively received by critics, who found it an uninspired retread of one of Lang's lesser works.

== Plot ==
Reporter C.J. Nicholas built his career on an award-winning documentary about a pregnant teenage prostitute in Buffalo, New York, who died of an overdose after the death of her baby. Now a TV reporter in Shreveport, Louisiana, he works to reestablish himself through an investigative unit with co-worker Corey Finley.

Nicholas is convinced that District Attorney Mark Hunter is corrupt. A former police detective discussed as a candidate for Governor, Hunter built his career on a string of convictions based on last-minute, circumstantial evidence. After Nicholas flirts with Assistant D.A. Ella Crystal to obtain a videotape, they begin dating, despite his distrust of her boss.

The tape suggests that Hunter uses his former partner on the force, Lt. Merchant – lead detective on all of Hunter's successful cases – to obtain DNA evidence from suspects in custody and plant it to support a conviction. Nicholas cannot prove how the evidence could be planted, and his boss is forced to cancel his investigative unit due to budget cuts.

Determined to expose Hunter, Nicholas concocts a scheme to frame himself for a prostitute's murder using circumstantial evidence. Finley accompanies him to obtain objects that will link Nicholas to the murder, which he records on video with Nicholas holding a newspaper, showing the date to be after the murder. The original video is kept in Finley's desk with a back-up placed in a safe deposit box.

Nicholas gets himself arrested for DUI by a police contact, Lt. Nickerson, while wearing his falsified circumstantial evidence. He is arrested and charged with the murder, but Merchant requests the case be transferred to him to steal credit for the DA, to Nickerson's dismay. Upon investigating Nicholas' activity, Merchant informs Hunter that Nicholas is trying to set them up.

The next step in Nicholas' plan is to wait until the prosecution rests its case, then introduce the documentary evidence exposing the truth. Hunter instructs Merchant to destroy the video evidence, and Finley finds his desk ransacked. He tries to retrieve the back-up, but is killed during a pursuit with Merchant, and the back-up is destroyed.

Nicholas reveals his plot in court using only the dated receipts for his falsified evidence, but Hunter casts doubt on his story. Nicholas has no proof that the victim's blood, found on his false evidence, was planted by Hunter; with Finley's death, he has no visual proof of his plan. The jury convicts Nicholas, and he is sentenced to death.

Still believing in Nicholas, Crystal begins her own investigation. Unaware that Hunter knows she is dating Nicholas, she is followed by Merchant. Hunter visits Nicholas on death row to reveal that Nicholas' calls to Crystal, guiding her investigation, have been recorded.

Crystal obtains crime scene photos from Hunter's convictions and takes them to photography experts, who determine that each object containing the suspect's DNA was digitally added to the photos after the fact. When she attempts to go to the police, Merchant tries to kill her with his car, but Nickerson shoots Merchant dead, revealing that he had been "following him following" Crystal.

The doctored photo evidence leads to Hunter's arrest in a public scandal. Nicholas is released, his conviction declared a mistrial, and he becomes a media celebrity, while Hunter's convictions are due to be re-examined by the state.

Re-watching Nicholas' documentary, Crystal recognizes the prostitute's hands as the hands of the victim in the murder for which Nicholas was convicted. She deduces that Nicholas hired the woman to play the prostitute in the documentary; when the woman later came to Shreveport to blackmail Nicholas, he really did kill her, using her murder to expose Hunter.

Confronting Nicholas, Crystal is horrified when he tries to defend himself and implies that exposing Hunter was worth the woman's life. Crystal, having already alerted the police, tells Nicholas the flaw in his plan: he is not subject to double jeopardy law because his case was only declared a mistrial. Disgusted, Crystal leaves as the police arrive to arrest Nicholas, but not before saying that his actions were never about arresting Hunter, but to protect his life of lies, asking him "how can I love a lie?"

== Cast ==
- Jesse Metcalfe as Christopher John "C.J." Nicholas
- Amber Tamblyn as Ella Crystal
- Michael Douglas as Mark Hunter
- Joel David Moore as Corey Finley
- Orlando Jones as Detective Ben Nickerson
- Lawrence P. Beron as Lieutenant Alex Merchant
- Sewell Whitney as Martin Weldon
- David Jensen as Gary Spota
- Sharon K. London as Judge Sheppard
- Krystal Kofie as Taieesha
- Grant James as Aaron Wakefield
- Wallace Merck as Gilbert Romans
- Robert Larriviere as Kevin Lynn Tarlow
- Randal Reeder as Survivalist

== Production ==
=== Development ===
A remake of Fritz Lang's Beyond a Reasonable Doubt was previously in the works at Universal circa 1998 for producer Gary Lucchesi, as part of a planned series of RKO remakes made in cooperation with various studios such as Universal, Disney and Miramax. It was then slated to be directed by Jonathan Mostow and written by Sam Montgomery, both of whom were coming off the hit thriller Breakdown. Some sources mention Mostow as both director and producer. That version did not happen, but a remake remained under consideration at RKO by mid-2002.

The project resurfaced in April 2004 when New Regency announced it had bought a spec script from David Collard for a remake at Fox. In June 2005, Franc Reyes was publicly attached to rewrite and direct the film, scheduled to begin shooting in September of that year, but his version did not materialize either.

The remake was re-announced in February 2008 at Berlin's European Film Market, with Peter Hyams directing and Michael Douglas headlining the cast. This time, RKO partnered with Mark Damon's Foresight Unlimited, Moshe Diamant's Signature Pictures and Courtney Solomon's Autonomous Pictures, a company spun off his After Dark Films to produce less genre-oriented fare.

Douglas also had a pre-existing relationship with Moshe Diamant, who had produced several movies in the late 80s and early 90s with his company The Stone Group. Hyams had previously directed Douglas in another legal thriller, 1983's The Star Chamber. The director, who wrote the new version himself, had first considered a Doubt retelling in 1990, when RKO boss Ted Hartley offered him to look at the company's library for a potential follow-up to Narrow Margin, but it did not happen at the time. He was not a fan of the original script, which focused too much on the lawyers for his taste but, as a former journalist, he saw potential in the premise. The new incarnation of Beyond a Reasonable Doubt was pitched as "Youthful Noir", and up-and-coming actors Jesse Metcalfe and Amber Tamblyn were cast alongside Douglas in an effort to introduce the genre to a new generation of viewers.

=== Filming and post-production ===
Beyond a Reasonable Doubt was shot in the Shreveport–Bossier agglomeration in Louisiana, where it is set. It was part of a record slate of films shot in 2008 in the state, an attractive destination for producers since the advent of a tax incentive program directed at the movie industry in 2002. The film's central location is the city's historic Caddo Parish Courthouse, built in 1926.

Principal photography was scheduled for March 3 through April 14, 2008. It was Hyams' first film to be shot using digital equipment. He wanted to wait for the advent of a "legitimate" 4K camera before making the jump to the new technology. The film was shot on Red cameras, and the director—one of the few to photograph his own features—found the lighting process no different than with his previous film rig. The picture was edited with Apple's Final Cut Pro software.

== Release ==
Beyond a Reasonable Doubt's release was originally planned for May 1, 2009 in the U.S., but it was delayed there and ended up premiering in Spain instead.

The film's release method varied greatly depending on territories. It debuted theatrically in Spain on July 10, 2009, through distributor DeAPlaneta, on a respectable 210 screens, reaching fourth place at the box office. In Italy, it was given a 198-screen release by the major Medusa Film. It also received a 102-screen opening in Germany from 24 Bilder Filmagentur, and a modest 74-screen release from distributor West in Russia.

In the United States, the film's September 11, 2009 theatrical release was handled by After Dark Films and Anchor Bay Entertainment, and limited to five major urban centers. The home video followed on December 22, 2009, through Anchor Bay.

Beyond A Reasonable Doubt was expected to receive a theatrical release in the U.K. from Entertainment Films, which was the first foreign buyer announced for the film. But as the planned October 2, 2009 date approached, mentions of the impending opening disappeared, and it eventually surfaced on home video thirteen months later via the same company. It also premiered on home video in markets such as Brazil and Japan. In France, it premiered on premium TV channel Canal+ on December 12, 2009.

== Reception ==
On Rotten Tomatoes the film has an approval rating of 7% based on 28 reviews, with an average rating of 3.3/10. The website's critical consensus reads, "Hackneyed and over dramatic, this undercooked courtroom drama suffers from bad dialogue and a twist ending you'll see from a distance." Metacritic, which uses a weighted average, assigned the film a score of 35 out of 100, based on 11 critics, indicating "generally unfavorable" reviews.

Several critics were unenthusiastic about the remake from the get-go, pointing to the deficiencies of the 1956 original, which the New York Times′ Jeanette Catsoulis called "flawed", The Hollywood Reporter's Frank Scheck deemed to be "no great shakes to begin with", and the Los Angeles Times′ Robert Abele dismissed as "already a preposterous yarn 50 years ago".

A majority of reviewers decried the film as too conventional, with Sheck summing it up as "mediocre" and noting "several gratuitous actions sequences that don’t add appreciably to the suspense level". Claudia Puig of USA Today concurred, saying "Beyond A Reasonable Doubt stands guilty of mediocrity. [It is] a generic, forgettable courtroom thriller." Variety's Jonathan Holland was slightly more positive, calling the film "noisy and excessive", "enjoyably slick but entirely soulless".

Of the film's narrative, Jason Thurston of TV Guide gave a middling assessment, saying "There's fun to be had in a rickety Coney Island rollercoaster manner, and it's not terrible late at night on the couch with a bag of warm popcorn, though it is just too silly and slight for all its bluster." While Holland called the final revelation "better signaled" than in the original, the BBC's Sue Robinson judged it "not worth the wait". Kurt Loder of MTV.com credited the story with "enduring cleverness" and wrote that the "artfully kinked ending, while no longer entirely fresh, does provide a certain formal satisfaction—although by the time it arrives, we barely care."

The revised screenplay was also noted for distancing itself from the 1956 film's overt political leanings, with Catsoulis assessing that Hyams "removed the anti-death-penalty slant from Douglas Morrow’s 1956 screenplay" and Scheck observing that he "ignores the social aspects of the original, which took a highly dim view of the death penalty".

Jesse Metcalfe was deemed too bland and unfit for the material. Robinson said that he "merely goes through the motions" and Loder decreed that "his yogurty persona is as far from noir as you can get without spending a day at the beach." Douglas' performance was diversely received, with Sheck praising his "stalwart presence", while Robinson thought he "hammed it up".

Beyond a Reasonable Doubt: Original Motion Picture Score

Film score by David Shire
- Released: 2009
- Genre: Orchestral
- Length: 25:41

David Shire chronology
Zodiac (2007)	Beyond a Reasonable Doubt (2009)	Quitters (2015)

== Soundtrack ==
Beyond a Reasonable Doubt's soundtrack was composed by David Shire. Shire described it as a "bread and butter psychological suspense score" and called Peter Hyams, with whom he had already done 2010: The Year We Make Contact, "easy to work with". It has only been made available by the composer as a promo.

== In popular culture ==
The shooting of the film is commemorated by a stop of interest on the Louisiana Film Trail, a tourist itinerary connecting the state's most famous filming locations, and inaugurated by authorities in 2009. The sign stands in front of Shreveport's Caddo Parish Courthouse, and marked the first stop on the trail at the time of its launch.
