= Matt Battaglia =

American football player and actor (born 1965)

- Born: Matteo Martin Battaglia; September 25, 1965 (age 61); Tallahassee, Florida, U.S.
- Occupations: Football player, actor, producer
- Years active: 1989 (football player); 1989–present (actor)
- Spouse: Tina Frazier (m. 2006)
- Children: 2
- Football career

No. 52
- Position: Linebacker

Personal information
- Listed height: 6 ft 2 in (1.88 m)
- Listed weight: 225 lb (102 kg)

Career information
- College: Louisville
- NFL draft: 1987: undrafted

Career history
- Cleveland Browns (1987)*; Philadelphia Eagles (1987)
- * Offseason or practice squad member only

Career NFL statistics
- Games played: 3
- Games started: 3
- Tackles: 17
- Sacks: 1
- Caused Fumbles: 1
- Stats at Pro Football Reference

Matteo Martin "Matt" Battaglia (born September 25, 1965) is an American producer, actor and former American football linebacker.

== Football career ==
Battaglia played college football at the University of Louisville. Battaglia played at Louisville as a linebacker from 1983 to 1986 and was named Second Team All-South Independent, All-American by the Associated Press in 1985, leading the nation in tackles in 1985 & 1986, with 153 and 166 tackles respectively, averaging 15 tackles per game both seasons. Battaglia broke former All-Pro Otis Wilson's college tackling record and was named Most Valuable Player by his teammates and coaches. Battaglia had a brief career in professional football with the 1987 Philadelphia Eagles and recorded a sack of Chicago Bears quarterback Sean Payton.

== Acting and producing ==
Battaglia is an Emmy winning producer, has co-produced a two time Golden Globe nominated film and has been an actor in over 90 films, network pilots and television shows.

In 2011, he was an executive producer of Last Shot with Judge Gunn, which he sold straight into syndication with 130 episodes in season one. He won an Emmy in June 2012 as Executive Producer for its first season on the air. The show won an Emmy for Outstanding Legal/Courtroom Drama.

Battaglia co-produced the two time Golden Globe-nominated film Brothers, starring Tobey Maguire, Natalie Portman and Jake Gyllenhaal.

Battaglia sold 2 one hour dramas to Fox, in which the studio bought the rights to and financed the costs of the pilot script(s). The first one was Pyrates, in which he was partnered with Oscar winner Ridley Scott's production company Scott Free Productions and producer Tony To. Bad Monkeys received a pilot and script order by Fox Studios and the script was written by writer Jeff Eastin, best known for creating White Collar. He co-produced on the 2009 horror film Kill Theory, directed by Chris Moore.

As a feature film actor in 2017, he wrapped a role in director Tom Shadyac's film Brian Banks with Morgan Freeman and Greg Kinnear portraying the role of legendary football coach Pete Carroll. He acted in Thor where he held the role of Pete. He played as 49er Three, in the Sony Pictures action thriller Half Past Dead with Steven Seagal. He replaced Jean-Claude Van Damme in the lead role of Luc Deveraux in the action movies Universal Soldier II: Brothers in Arms and Universal Soldier III: Unfinished Business. He appeared in Army of One, Kiss of a Stranger, Pendulum and the direct-to-video film Raven.

In television, Battaglia appears in the Netflix series Best.Worst.Weekend.Ever.. In 2017, he appeared in David Lynch's Twin Peaks.

In 2016, he recurred in seven episodes of the Tyler Perry series, Too Close To Home, playing the United States President. Battaglia guest starred as Agent Ward, in Hawaii Five-O. Night Shift saw him portray General Rozenfeld. And in Criminal Minds he was Captain Grant Howard. He appeared on Friends as the fireman boyfriend of Phoebe (played by Lisa Kudrow).

Other notable guest appearances include The Mentalist, as Curtis Nett, The Client List, as Don Jenkins, and in Longmire in 2012. He appeared in nine episodes of Queer as Folk (American TV series), as Drew Boyd, two episodes of 24, two episodes of HBO's Big Love, Shark, CSI: NY, Bones, Charmed, JAG, and Sabrina The Teenage Witch.

== Personal life ==
Battaglia married Tina Frazier in 2006; the couple have two children and live in Georgia.

== Filmography ==
=== Film ===
Year	Title	Role	Notes
1993	Chantilly Lace	Chris, The Pizza Boy	(TV Movie)
1993	Joshua Tree	Deputy Michael Agnos	
1994	Blue Sky	NATO Soldier	
1995	Showgirls	Andrew Carver's Bodyguard	
1996	Not Again!	Clete	
1996	Raven	Martin "Duce" Grant	(Video)
1998	Universal Soldier II: Brothers in Arms	Private Luc Deveraux / UniSol GR44	
1998	Universal Soldier III: Unfinished Business	Private Luc Deveraux / UniSol GR44	
1999	Avalon: Beyond the Abyss	Pete Trudeau	(TV Movie)
1999	Kiss of a Stranger	Nathan Leigh	
2001	Pendulum	William Cobb	
2002	Half Past Dead	"49er Three"	
2006	On the Brink	Ed Cohn	(Short)
2006	Hollis & Rae	Jim Clements	(TV Movie)
2007	Pandemic	Frank Jantzen	(TV Movie)
2009	The Perfect Game	Coach McAllen (as Matt Battaglia)	
2009	Cry No More	James Diaz	(TV Movie)
2010	The Client List	Don	(TV Movie)
2011	Thor	Pete	
2012	Madison High	Waylon	
2014	Reality	Mike	
2017	Brian Banks	Pete Carroll	

=== Television ===
Year	Title	Role	Notes
1989	B.L. Stryker	"Snake" / Pete	2 episodes
1990	21 Jump Street	Tim	1 episode
1991	Superboy	Darryll	1 episode
1991	Twin Peaks	Cop	1 episode
1991	Evening Shade	Mitch	1 episode
1991	Coach	Player #1	1 episode
1991	Matlock	Rudy Simms	1 episode
1991	Knots Landing	"Duke"	1 episode
1992	Sibs	Matt	1 episode
1993	Time Trax	Mark Lofton	1 episode
1994	Silk Stalkings	Bo Rainey	1 episode
1994	Renegade	Ted	1 episode
1995	Thunder Alley	Jack Crawford	1 episode
1996	Maybe This Time	Bobby	1 episode
1996	JAG	Lieutenant Alexander Kellogue	1 episode
1996	Caroline in the City	Joseph	1 episode
1996	Bedtime	Craig	1 episode
1997	Baywatch	Terry McFarren	1 episode
1997	Days of Our Lives	J.L. King	6 episodes
1997	Friends	Vince	1 episode
1998	George & Leo	Steve	1 episode
1998	Arli$$	Skip Myers	1 episode
1996–1998	Pacific Blue	Lloyd / "Rip" Cutter	3 episodes
1998	Encore! Encore!	Tina	1 episode
2000	Sabrina the Teenage Witch	Daniel Boone	2 episodes
2000	18 Wheels of Justice	Vince Youngblood	1 episode
2000	Cursed	Dan	1 episode
2000	The Michael Richards Show	Marcus Feal	1 episode
2000	3rd Rock from the Sun	Bryce Canyon	1 episode
2000	That '70s Show	Dean	1 episode
2001	Charmed	Journalist	1 episode
2001	Off Centre	O'Leary	1 episode
2002	Malcolm in the Middle	Merl	1 episode
2004	Century City	Mr. Portnoff	1 episode
2004–2005	Queer as Folk	Drew Boyd	9 episodes
2004–2005	NCIS	Petty Officer Porcaro	1 episode
2005	What I Like About You	Joe	1 episode
2006	Bones	Captain William Fuller	1 episode
2006	CSI: Miami	Dr. Trevor Valone	1 episode
2006–2007	24	Agent Jennings	2 episodes
2007	Big Love	Sheriff Thomas	2 episodes
2007	Shark	Don Kipling	1 episode
2008	CSI: NY	Dr. Harrison Green	1 episode
2009	NCIS: Los Angeles	Kurt Holgate	1 episode
2012	The Mentalist	Curtis Nett	1 episode
2012	The Client List	Don Jenkins	1 episode
2012	Mike & Molly	Rob	1 episode
2013	The Big Bang Theory	Officer Reynolds	1 episode
2013	Franklin & Bash	Johnny	1 episode
2015	Backstrom	Nick D'Agostino	1 episode
2015	NCIS New Orleans	Lieutenant Colonel Snow	1 episode
2015	The Night Shift	General Rozenfeld	1 episode
2015	Criminal Minds	Captain Grant Howard	1 episode
2015	Hawaii Five-O	Agent Ward	1 episode
2015	True Detective	Commander Floyd	4 episodes
2016–2017	Tyler Perry's Too Close to Home	President Thomas Christian	9 episodes
2017	Twin Peaks	Cowboy	1 episode
2017	SEAL Team	Master Chief Wilkins	1 episode
2018	Best.Worst.Weekend.Ever.	Colonel Andropolis	6 episodes
2018	Brian Banks	Pete Carroll	
2019	For All Mankind	John Glenn	1 episode
2020	Paradise Lost	Younger Judge Forsythe	6 episodes
2020	The Resident	Bill Landry	4 episodes
2020	9-1-1	Van Cleef	1 episode
2021	MacGyver	Reserved Man / Fixer	1 episode
