= Universal Soldier II: Brothers in Arms =

1998 television film directed by Jeff Woolnough

- Official VHS cover
- Genre: Action; Sci-Fi
- Written by: Peter M. Lenkov
- Directed by: Jeff Woolnough
- Starring: Matt Battaglia; Chandra West; Jeff Wincott; Gary Busey
- Music by: Ivan Doroschuk
- Country of origin: United States
- Original language: English

Production
- Executive producers: Kevin Gillis; John Laing
- Producer: Robert Wertheimer
- Cinematography: Russ Goozee
- Editor: Mike Lee
- Running time: 92 minutes
- Production companies: Catalyst Entertainment Production; Rigel Entertainment; Viacom Productions; Paramount Home Video

Original release
- Network: The Movie Channel
- Release: September 26, 1998

Related
- Universal Soldier (1992); Universal Soldier III: Unfinished Business (1998)

Universal Soldier II: Brothers in Arms is a 1998 made-for-television science fiction film directed by Jeff Woolnough and starring Matt Battaglia, Chandra West, Jeff Wincott and Gary Busey. It is the second installment in the Universal Soldier franchise. The film recasts all returning characters and introduces a long-lost brother to the hero, played by Wincott. It was followed in the same year by Universal Soldier III: Unfinished Business. In 1999, Universal Soldier: The Return, a theatrical sequel once again starring Jean-Claude Van Damme, retconed the plotline of the TV sequels.

== Plot ==
Following the failure of the original Universal Soldier program, the budget has been cut by the government. On orders from a mysterious CIA director, a crooked security consultant Otto Mazur, leads a gang of mercenaries who take control of a new line of Universal Soldiers. Mazur plans to sell fifty of them to a wealthy Asian client.

Meanwhile, Luc Deveraux reconnects with his parents, accompanied by reporter Veronica Roberts, now his girlfriend. Veronica learns from Luc's mother that he had an older brother named Eric who was reported killed in Vietnam when Luc was 9 years old, although his body was never repatriated. This was the impetus for the younger Deveraux's own enrollment. The adult Luc is drawn back to the UniSols' base by the activation of an automatic recall function. Veronica follows him and discovers that Eric is a UniSol as well, although the conversion process has never been completed and he has retained much of his free will.

== Cast ==
- Matt Battaglia as Private Luc Deveraux
- Chandra West as Veronica Roberts
- Jeff Wincott as Eric Devereaux
- Gary Busey as Dr. Otto Mazur
- Eric Bryson as Peterson
- Kevin Rushton as Martinez
- Desmond Campbell as Cooper
- Michael Copeman as Lieutenant Colonel Jack Cameron
- Burt Reynolds as CIA Deputy Director Mentor
- Richard McMillan as Dr. Walker
- Aron Tager as John Devereaux
- Barbara Gordon as Danielle Devereaux
- Andrew Jackson as Andrew Scott
- Carla Collins as Anchorwoman
- James Kee as Jasper
- Frank McAnulty as Purser
- Jared Wall as Luc Devereaux At 9 Years Old
- Neville Edwards as Porter
- Sophie Bennett as Annie
- Layton Morrison as Bodyguard
- James Kim as Sung Bodyguard
- Simon Kim as Sung Bodyguard

== Production ==
=== Development ===
In 1995, the embattled Carolco Pictures sold the television rights to its Universal Soldier franchise to Toronto-based Skyvision Entertainment. The Canadian company had a business strategy of turning successful theatrical films into television properties, and had already done so with RoboCop. A series of four television films was considered, but a change of ownership at Skyvision's parent company Labatt led to a scaling back of its entertainment endeavours. Former Skyvision executive Kevin Gillis revived the project at his new employer Catalyst Entertainment, in association with American outfit Durrant Fox Productions. The project was reformatted as a pair of television films, with eyes on a possible syndicated series.

=== Casting ===
The film recasts former American football player Matt Battaglia as Luc Deveraux, who received the role after coming to the production's offices on his own initiative and asking to read for it. Burt Reynolds appears in a limited capacity as overarching antagonist "Mentor", who takes greater importance in the sequel, Unfinished Business. The "Mentor" role was cast only a few days before the shoot, and Reynolds agreed to join the production on short notice as a favor to Battaglia. The veteran actor was a friend of Battaglia's father Carmello, with whom he played college football, and recommended his son try acting. Battaglia, to whom Reynolds was a real-life mentor, had previously supported the star on several shows he headlined. Canadian Andrew Jackson makes a brief appearance as Andrew Scott/GR13 in a re-enactment of the original film's final fight, which establishes continuity with the TV movies.

=== Filming ===
Brothers in Arms and Unfinished Business were primarily shot in Southern Ontario over 42 days spread between 27 October and 23 December 1997. Reynold joined the rest of the crew in early December. Downsview Military Base was used as the UniSols' operations center. Both pictures were shot concurrently, with the schedule alternating between scenes from each film. Battaglia described the filming of Universal Soldier as an overall smooth experience, with the notable exception of his relationship with Busey, whom he found difficult to work with. According to the actor, he did all of his stunts in both movies, with the exception of the scene where his character crashes through a large window in the first, as it could not be made out of candy glass. The two sequels had an aggregate budget of CAD$10.7 million. On December 11, Busey—who played Buddy Holly in a 1978 film—joined the cast of the musical Buddy: The Buddy Hollyday Story, which was then playing at Toronto's Princess of Wales Theatre.

== Release ==
Universal Soldier II: Brothers in Arms premiered on cable television via The Movie Channel, a sister channel of Showtime, on September 26, 1998. The film was paired with a rerun of the original film, which followed it. It was released on VHS by Paramount Home Video on 22 June 1999. According to Battaglia, Universal Soldier II and III—or a combination of both—were at some point considered to become Showtime's first theatrical releases, before they reverted to TV premieres.

Brothers in Arms received a 2002 DVD release by TVA Films in Canada, as part of a double feature that also includes the next installment Unfinished Business. Some German home video versions of the film are sold as Neu Bearbeitete Fassung (Newly Edited Version), but this merely indicates that they are cut for violence.

== Reception ==
On review aggregation website Rotten Tomatoes the film has a 0% approval rating based on 7 reviews, with an average rating of 4/10. Canadian media watchdog Mediafilm was less than impressed by the film or its sequel, calling out their "mechanical and uninventive screenplay" as well as their "noisy and overdone direction". Ballantine Books' Video Movie Guide called the film a "boring by-the-numbers" effort, rating it a two on a scale of one to five. TV Guide wrote that "[s]ome padding and extraneous plot developments aside, this gruesomely graphic action picture is a must-see for those who enjoy seeing undead marines impaled on farm machinery or crushed in trash compactors". The BBC's Radio Times called it "efficient, undemanding exploitation." VideoHound rated it a two on a scale of zero to four.

The film received additional reviews from specialized genre outlets, which were similarly lackluster. Bulletproof Action lambasted the film's "sluggish" pacing. Although pleased by the decision to make it a direct sequel, a rarity among TV adaptations of theatrical films, The Action Elite called it "boring" and "lifeless", with special criticism for its "appalling" score. Moria Reviews also deemed the soundtrack "inappropriate", and branded the flashy editing as "pretentious". Outlaw Vern was more accepting of those stylistic flourishes, which he saw as an attempt to make the film stand out. However, he found that Battaglia's turn as Devereaux made fellow NFLer-turned-actor Howie Long "look like Jeremy Irons".

== Sequel ==
A sequel titled Universal Soldier III: Unfinished Business, was released in 1998.
