= Universal Soldier III: Unfinished Business =

1999 television film directed by Jeff Woolnough

- Official VHS cover
- Genre: Action; Sci-Fi
- Written by: Peter M. Lenkov
- Directed by: Jeff Woolnough
- Starring: Matt Battaglia; Chandra West; Jeff Wincott; Richard McMillan; Burt Reynolds
- Music by: Ivan Doroschuk
- Country of origin: United States
- Original language: English

Production
- Executive producers: Kevin Gillis; John Laing
- Producer: Robert Wertheimer
- Cinematography: Russ Goozee
- Editor: Robert K. Sprogis
- Running time: 95 minutes
- Production companies: Catalyst Entertainment Production; Rigel Entertainment; Viacom Productions; Paramount Home Video

Original release
- Network: The Movie Channel
- Release: October 24, 1998

Related
- Universal Soldier II: Brothers in Arms (1998)

Universal Soldier III: Unfinished Business is a 1998 American made-for-television science fiction film directed by Jeff Woolnough and starring Matt Battaglia, Chandra West, Jeff Wincott, Richard McMillan, and Burt Reynolds. Like Universal Soldier II: Brothers in Arms, none of the actors or crew of the original returned, but most of the cast and crew from the first sequel are present. In 1999, a theatrical sequel starring Jean-Claude Van Damme again, Universal Soldier: The Return, ignored the plotline of the two sequels.

== Plot ==
Luc Devereaux, a rejected "UniSol" (a superhuman soldier designed to be the perfect killing machine), and journalist Veronica Roberts travel to Canada to continue their attempts to expose the Universal Soldier unit. After a hostage situation mistakenly leaves Veronica a fugitive, the two escape the city and go into hiding.

Meanwhile, CIA Deputy Director Mentor and Dr. Walker are in the process of creating a powerful, UniSol clone of Luc's brother, Eric, to assassinate him and Veronica. The program is under section GR-44. Deveraux and Roberts flee to Canada, hoping to find a news outlet that will tell their story as GR-44 is in hot pursuit.

The finale hints at a broad conspiracy involving "sleeper" UniSols planted in every branch of the U.S. government, up to the White House from which a voice impersonating then president Bill Clinton answers Risco's activation signal.

== Cast ==
- Matt Battaglia as Private Luc Deveraux
- Jeff Wincott as Eric Deveraux
- Burt Reynolds as CIA Deputy Director Mentor
- Chandra West as Veronica Roberts
- Richard McMillan as Dr. Walker
- Roger Periard as McNally
- Juan Chioran as Charles Clifton
- Claudette Roche as Grace
- John F.S. Laing as Martin Daniels
- Jovanni Sy as Max
- Aron Tager as John Deveraux
- James Kee as Jasper
- Lloyd Adams as Hugo
- Vince Corazza as Lowell
- Gerry Mendicino as Chief Thorpe
- Dan Duran as Freddie Smith
- Thomas Hauff as General Clancy
- John Stoneham Sr. as Sheriff
- Martin Roach as Orderly
- Philip Williams as Scully

== Production ==
Unfinished Business and its predecessor Brothers in Arms were primarily shot in Southern Ontario over 42 days spread between 27 October and 23 December 1997. Downsview Military Base was used as the UniSols' operations center. Both pictures were shot concurrently, with the schedule alternating between scenes from each film. The two films had an aggregate budget of $10.7 million.

The shoot was occasionally disrupted by Canadian seasonal weather. Part III's climactic scene, which required a Fairchild C-123 Provider to be flown in from the U.S. due to a shortage of pilots for similar aircraft available in the country, was delayed by a two-day blizzard.

Matt Battaglia's personal friend Burt Reynolds plays the main villain of the film, "Mentor", who was introduced at the end of the previous film. The character's real name (Gerard Risco) is a backronym, as the G.R. prefix found in each UniSol's identifier is revealed to be derived from his initials. In the novelization of the first film's script by Robert Tine, G.R. stood for Grave Registration.

The ending was left open for a potential regular series. Three syndicators had reportedly expressed interest at the time of filming, but it did not materialize.

== Release ==
Universal Soldier III: Unfinished Business premiered on television on The Movie Channel, a sister channel of Showtime, on 24 October 1998. It was released on VHS by Paramount Home Video on 13 July 1999.

Unfinished Business received a 2002 DVD release by TVA Films in Canada, as part of a double feature that also includes the previous installment Brothers in Arms.

Some German home video versions of the film are sold as Neu Bearbeitete Fassung (Newly Edited Version), but this merely indicates that they are cut for violence.

== Reception ==
On review aggregation website Rotten Tomatoes the film has a 20% approval rating based on 5 reviews, with an average rating of 4.4/10.

Reviews from genre outlets were also negative. VideoHound rated the film one and a half on a scale of zero to four, slightly lower than Part II. Bulletproof Action said that "Brothers in Arms was no masterpiece [...] But things still managed to go downhill in Unfinished Business". The Action Elite found the film "awful", albeit "kind of better" than Part II. Moria Reviews rated the film marginally higher than the previous installment, but still found fault with Jeff Woolnough's "annoyingly posed and affected" direction. Creature Features: The Science Fiction, Fantasy, and Horror Movie Guide gave the picture two stars out of five. TV Guide also gave it two out of five stars. The publication praised West and Battaglia's chemistry, but ultimately felt that the film "[wasn't] great entertainment". Den of Geek called both Unfinished Business and its predecessor "flat and as uninspired as you would expect from a made-for-cable spin off".
