= Universal Soldier: The Return =

1999 film by Mic Rodgers

- Theatrical release poster
- Directed by: Mic Rodgers
- Written by: William Malone; John Fasano
- Based on: Characters by Richard Rothstein; Christopher Leitch; Dean Devlin
- Produced by: Craig Baumgarten; Allen Shapiro; Jean-Claude Van Damme
- Starring: Jean-Claude Van Damme; Michael Jai White; Kiana Tom; Daniel von Bargen; Bill Goldberg
- Cinematography: Mike Benson
- Edited by: Peck Prior
- Music by: Don Davis
- Production companies: TriStar Pictures; Baumgarten Prophet Entertainment; IndieProd Company; Long Road Entertainment
- Distributed by: Sony Pictures Releasing
- Release date: August 20, 1999
- Running time: 83 minutes
- Country: United States
- Language: English
- Budget: $22–45 million
- Box office: $10.7 million

Universal Soldier: The Return is a 1999 American science fiction action film, directed by Mic Rodgers, and written by William Malone and John Fasano. It stars Jean-Claude Van Damme, reprising his role as Luc Deveraux, and also features Michael Jai White, Kiana Tom, Daniel von Bargen and Bill Goldberg. It is the fourth in the Universal Soldier film series.

The film was theatrically released in the United States on August 20, 1999. It received negative reviews from critics, and grossed $11 million. A fifth film in the series, Universal Soldier: Regeneration, was released in 2009.

== Plot ==
At least 15 years after Andrew Scott's death, (Note: As depicted in Universal Soldier (1992).) former UniSol Luc Deveraux has been reverted to normal via genetic procedures. He currently works as a technical expert for the U.S. government with his new partner Maggie, who has been through countless hours of combat training with him. They worked to refine and perfect the UniSol Program in an effort to make a new, stronger breed of soldiers that are more sophisticated and intelligent to reduce the use of normal, human soldiers in the battlefield. All of the new UniSols, known as UniSols 2500, which are faster and stronger than the original UniSols, are connected via neural implants through a sentient artificially intelligent computer system called S.E.T.H. (Self-Evolving Thought Helix).

When S.E.T.H. discovers that the UniSol Program is scheduled to be shut down because of budget cuts, he finds this to be a disgrace and decides to take action by formulating a plot to overthrow mankind and take over the world with his own massive army of UniSols. The next day, S.E.T.H. unleashes a platoon of UniSols, led by the musclebound Romeo, in a hostile takeover of the UniSol building, resulting in the deaths of many occupants, including Dr. Dylan Cotner, who was responsible for reverting Luc back to normal. As such, Luc, Maggie, and the others are forced to evacuate. With the help of a rogue cyberpunk named Squid, S.E.T.H. is able to put himself into a UniSol body superior to the others. In the meantime, Maggie noticed that Luc's daughter Hillary Deveraux has suffered brain swelling after almost being attacked by Romeo, and Maggie takes her to the local hospital.

Luc attempts to find a way to shut down S.E.T.H. with help from ambitious reporter Erin Young, whose cameraman died in the massacre. General Radford wants to take extreme measures to stop S.E.T.H. by sending in troops, but most of the troops (alongside a TV reporter and her crew) were massacred by four UniSols; even when Luc briefly tried to lead a team of United States Army Rangers commanded by Captain Blackburn and Sergeant Morrow, most of the Rangers (including Blackburn and Morrow) are killed when a UniSol sentry sees them sneaking into the building.

Luc and Erin then track down Squid after learning that he was a former member of the UniSol Program, but S.E.T.H. arrives and kills Squid, revealing an ultimatum to Luc: he must give up the secret code that is needed to deactivate a built-in program that will shut S.E.T.H. down in a matter of hours so that no one will stop him. To ensure that Luc will cooperate, a departing S.E.T.H. got Romeo to track down Hillary at the hospital, and S.E.T.H. kidnaps Hillary while Romeo kills Maggie and several hospital guards. Upon returning to the UniSol building, S.E.T.H. deactivated a time bomb implanted by Radford to prevent the UniSol building from being destroyed, much to Radford's outrage.

Having no other choice, Luc returns to the UniSol building again and takes down many UniSols, right before learning that Maggie has been revived as a UniSol. He also learns that S.E.T.H. is healing Hillary with UniSol technology, and upon deciphering code, S.E.T.H. decides to kill Luc and raise Hillary as his own daughter. Eventually, Luc destroys S.E.T.H. by shattering his body to pieces with liquid nitrogen, but the remaining UniSols are still active; even Romeo catches and defeats Luc in combat, intending to kill him and Hillary and lead the remaining UniSols into battle. However, Maggie (who has been freed due to S.E.T.H.'s demise) shoots Romeo and allows Luc and Hillary to leave, asking Luc to blow up the building with herself, Romeo and the remaining UniSols inside as she refuses to live the rest of her life as a UniSol. Luc reluctantly obliged Maggie's wishes by setting off the time bomb to destroy the building, killing the remaining UniSols for good. Luc then reunites with Erin and Hillary, satisfied that they have put an end to S.E.T.H.'s plot and avenged their loved ones.

== Cast ==
- Jean-Claude Van Damme as Private Luc Deveraux
- Michael Jai White as S.E.T.H. Super UniSol
- Heidi Schanz as Erin Young
- Xander Berkeley as Dr. Dylan Cotner
- Justin Lazard as Captain Blackburn
- Kiana Tom as Maggie
- Daniel Von Bargen as General Radford
- James R. Black as Sergeant Morrow
- Karis Paige Bryant as Hillary Deveraux
- Bill Goldberg as Romeo UniSol
- Brent Anderson as 2nd Technician
- Brent Hinkley as "Squid"
- Lyle Kanouse as UniSol 2500 (voice)
- Adam Russell Stuart as General's Aide
- Sylvester Terkay as Hospital Worker

An archival footages of Trini Tran and Tai Thai appear uncredited as Vietnamese Woman and Vietnamese Man from the first film, while the archival recordings of Michael Jai White (also cast in the lead role of this film) and Tom Tanglang as Soldiers are used for the flashback involving Luc Deveraux.

== Production ==
=== Development and writing ===
Producer Craig Baumgarten had wanted to make a sequel for years but due to the bankruptcy of Carolco the rights were unavailable. The script was not originally written as a sequel but was adapted to fit into the series. Mic Rodgers was chosen as director based on his work in action films; he previously worked as stunt coordinator on various films including Lethal Weapon, and was the second unit director on Braveheart, Nothing to Lose, and later The Fast and the Furious. Before Rodgers was chosen, William Malone was originally involved to direct the film, who adapted the script for the film. Columbia Pictures was originally involved and acquired the film rights, but TriStar, which previously released the original film, won the rights.

=== Filming ===
Filming took place at the abandoned Super Collider in Texas, for three months during the winter.

=== Casting ===
Michael Jai White, who previously appeared in the original film, joined the cast as the antagonist.

== Music ==
A film soundtrack was released by Trauma:

1. "Crush 'Em" – Megadeth
2. "Remain Calm" – One Minute Silence
3. "Awake" – Clay People
4. "Crazy Train" – The Flys
5. "Bled For Days" – Static-X
6. "Fueled" – Anthrax
7. "Magic, No. 3" – Jact
8. "Hatred" – D Generation
9. "Securitron (Police State 2000)" – Fear Factory
10. "Eureka Pile" – Ministry
11. "Chaos" – Tim Skold
12. "Saddam A-Go-Go" – Gwar
13. "Target: Devereux" – Don Davis

Prior to his return to professional wrestling in the summer of 1999, Romeo actor Bill Goldberg spoke with officials of his employer, World Championship Wrestling (WCW) to allow him to use Crush 'Em as his walk-out theme and for Megadeth to play the song live for his return on the July 5, 1999 edition of WCW Monday Nitro, as Goldberg was a fan of the band. Goldberg would continue to use Crush 'Em as his walk-out theme until October 1999

== Release ==
=== Home media ===
DVD was released via Region 1 and VHS in the United States on December 28, 1999 and re-released on DVD in 2004, and also Region 2 in the United Kingdom on 1 July 2002, it was distributed by Columbia TriStar Home Entertainment. It was also released via Laserdisc exclusively in Japan. The film was double-featured with Universal Soldier via DVD in Norwegian around 2001. On 4 October 2010, Universal Soldier trilogy DVD was released on 4 October 2010, followed by Universal Soldier Quadrilogy Box Set on 11 February 2013.

In March 2009, the film was released on Blu-ray for the first time by Sony Pictures Home Entertainment. In 2012, as part of a distribution deal with Sony, Mill Creek Entertainment re-released the film as part of a Jean-Claude Van Damme themed Hollywood Hits set along with Knock Off, The Hard Corps and, Second in Command.

In 2013, a second Blu-ray of the film was released, again by Mill Creek Entertainment, as a double feature with Second in Command.

The film has since been featured in various action film compilations from Mill Creek Entertainment.

88Films released the film on Blu-ray in November 2020, limited to 3000 copies with numbered slipcase, fold out poster & booklet.

== Reception ==
=== Box office ===
The movie did poorly at the box office debuting at #4. Universal Soldier: The Return grossed just $10 million in the United States. According to the Los Angeles Times the film was a "marginal money loser".

=== Critical response ===
Reviews were largely negative. On Rotten Tomatoes the film has a 5% rating based on reviews from 58 critics, with an average rating of 2.89/10. The website's critical consensus states: "Universal Soldier: The Return fails on almost every level, from its generic story to its second rate action and subpar performances". On Metacritic, the film has a score of 24 out of 100 based on reviews from 14 critics, indicating "generally unfavorable reviews". Audiences polled by CinemaScore gave the film an average grade of "C−" on an A+ to F scale.

James Berardinelli gave the film a score of one and a half stars out of four and remarked that "some of the explosions are cool. There's an exploitatively entertaining sequence in a strip joint that features a bevy of topless women. Still, despite all the pyrotechnics, I almost dozed off twice". Joe Leydon of Variety magazine called it "an underwhelming follow-up to one of the career-stalled action star's better efforts". Paul Malcolm, of L.A. Weekly described the film as "a mind-numbing exercise in body counts and big tits".

Mick LaSalle of The San Francisco Chronicle wrote a mixed review, saying the film "has a shameless B-movie exuberance" and that it "is nothing for anyone to be proud of, on either side of the screen, but it's a lively 90 minutes". Kevin Thomas of The Los Angeles Times called it a satisfying sequel.
