= Laserblast =

1978 science fiction movie produced by Charles Band

- Theatrical release poster
- Directed by: Michael Rae
- Written by: Frank Ray Perilli; Franne Schacht
- Produced by: Charles Band
- Starring: Kim Milford; Cheryl Smith; Gianni Russo; Roddy McDowall; Keenan Wynn; Dennis Burkley
- Cinematography: Terry Bowen
- Edited by: Jodie Copelan
- Music by: Richard Band; Joel Goldsmith
- Production company: Charles Band Productions
- Distributed by: Irwin Yablans Company
- Release date: March 1, 1978
- Running time: 80 minutes
- Country: United States
- Language: English

Laserblast is a 1978 American independent science fiction film directed by Michael Rae and produced by Charles Band, widely known for producing B movies. Starring Kim Milford, Cheryl Smith, Gianni Russo, Keenan Wynn, Roddy McDowall, and Eddie Deezen (marking his screen debut), the plot follows an unhappy teenage loner who discovers an alien laser cannon and goes on a murderous rampage, seeking revenge against those who he feels have wronged him.

The reptilian alien creatures in the film were works of stop motion animation by animator David W. Allen, beginning a decades-long collaboration between Allen and Band. The featured alien spacecraft model was designed and built by Greg Jein in two weeks, and the musical score was written in five days by Joel Goldsmith and Richard Band, the first film score for both composers.

Laserblast has received overwhelmingly negative reviews and consistently ranks among the Bottom 100 list of films on the Internet Movie Database. Many critical reviews, however, cited Allen's stop motion animation as one of its only redeeming qualities. A sequel was planned for 1988, but was ultimately abandoned due to financial difficulties. Laserblast was featured in the seventh season finale of the comedy television series Mystery Science Theater 3000 in its Comedy Central Run, before moving to SciFi Channel.

== Plot ==
A green-skinned man wanders aimlessly through the desert with a mysterious laser cannon attached to his arm. Nearby, an alien spacecraft lands and two reptilian creatures emerge carrying weapons. After a brief firefight, the aliens disintegrate the man. Spotting an airplane, they return to their spacecraft and fly away, leaving behind the laser cannon and a pendant the man was wearing. Elsewhere, teenager Billy Duncan wakes up in his bed. He goes outside to find his mother has been invited to a trip to Acapulco and, despite her son's protests, she leaves her son behind. A dejected Billy goes to visit his girlfriend Kathy, but her grandfather Colonel Farley, a disheveled military veteran, rants about conspiracy theories to Billy and tells him to leave Kathy alone. Billy is soon harassed by a bully named Chuck Boran and his nerdy friend Froggy as well as by two sheriff deputies who give him a speeding ticket.

Billy wanders into the desert alone and discovers the laser cannon and the mysterious pendant. Realizing he is able to use the cannon only while wearing the pendant, Billy starts firing randomly at things in the desert. Meanwhile, on the alien spacecraft, the two aliens converse (in an unsubtitled alien language) with their leader, who orders them to return to Earth and recover the cannon. Meanwhile, Billy and Kathy attend a pool party with other teens, where Chuck makes unwanted advances on Kathy, resulting in Billy fighting with Chuck and Froggy. That night, Billy fires at Chuck's car with the laser cannon, resulting in an explosion that Chuck and Froggy barely escape. Later, a government official named Tony Craig arrives to investigate both the explosion and the area of desert where Billy found the cannon. Tony informs the local sheriff that news related to the explosion and its cause must not leave the town.

Billy eventually develops an unusual growth on his chest. At Kathy's urging, he visits Doctor Mellon, who surgically removes a metallic disc from Billy's sternum. He calls the police laboratory technician Mike London to arrange for the disc to be evaluated. However, later that night, a green-skinned and seemingly crazed Billy opens fire on Mellon's car, killing him in an explosion. The next day, Tony investigates the wreckage and recovers unusual material, which he brings to Mike London. After some experiments, Mike concludes it is made of inorganic material not found on Earth. Later that night, Billy, once again appearing deranged and grotesque, attacks and kills the two sheriff deputies who harassed him earlier.

Billy sleeps with Kathy next to his van. While he is sleeping, Kathy discovers the alien pendant and puts it on Billy's chest, which turns his skin green and deforms his face. Billy attacks Kathy, but she escapes. Billy goes on a rampage, shooting things at random with the laser cannon. A small airplane with law enforcement officials opens fire on Billy, but he destroys the plane. Next, he kills Chuck and Froggy by destroying their new car with the cannon. Meanwhile, Tony Craig questions Colonel Farley and Kathy about Billy, while elsewhere the two aliens land on Earth and begin searching for Billy themselves. After killing a hippie and stealing his van, Billy travels to an empty city block where he fires indiscriminately at his surroundings. Kathy and Tony arrive and find Billy in an alley, just as one of the aliens shoots Billy with a ray from atop a nearby building. Billy is killed, the laser cannon and the pendant are destroyed, and the aliens depart in their spacecraft. Kathy cries over Billy's corpse as Tony looks on.

== Cast ==
- Kim Milford as Billy Duncan
- Cheryl Smith as Kathy Farley
- Gianni Russo as Tony Craig
- Roddy McDowall as Dr. Mellon (McDowall's name is misspelled as "McDowell" in the credits)
- Keenan Wynn as Colonel Farley
- Dennis Burkley as Deputy Pete Ungar
- Barry Cutler as Deputy Jesse Jeep
- Mike Bobenko as Chuck Boran
- Eddie Deezen as "Froggy"
- Ron Masak as Sheriff
- Rick Walters as Mike London
- Joanna Lipari as Franny Walton
- Wendy Wernli as Carolyn Spicer

== Background ==
=== Writing ===
There were a lot of revenge stories out at the time: Death Wish and all sorts of films. The thought was why can't some kid that has been pushed around a bit and hasn't been treated very well at school find some crazy alien weapon and blow the crap out of everything and every person who tormented him.

— Producer Charles Band

Laserblast was produced by Charles Band, who is widely known as a writer, producer, and director of B movies. Band described the film as a "revenge story" with a simple premise that he thought would be fun for the audience. It was Band who conceived the title of the film with the hopes that it would grab the attention of audiences.

Band said, "Most of the films that I made, that I conceived, that I was very involved with and in some cases directed, definitely started with the title and usually a piece of artwork that made sense. Then I would work back to the script and the story and make the movie."

The script was written by Frank Ray Perilli and Franne Schacht. Elements of the story were inspired by science fiction films, such as Star Wars (1977), and Close Encounters of the Third Kind (1977), while the characteristics of protagonist Billy Duncan—a disenchanted middle-class teen from a suburban setting—mirror those of James Dean's character in Rebel Without a Cause (1955).

Band wanted Laserblast to be a "mini-Star Wars", and at one point in the film, a disparaging reference is made when Billy fires his laser cannon at a Star Wars billboard, resulting in a tremendous explosion. During another scene, a police officer is confronted by a frightened teenager, who the officer dismisses as crazy by saying, "He's seen Star Wars five times!"

Billy is ignored and abandoned by his mother early in the film, demonstrating the dangers that can result from uncaring parents, one of the major themes of the script. The film also highlights the hypocrisy of police officers, particularly during a scene in which the two deputies smoke marijuana that they obtained from teenagers. Commentators have pointed out several inaccuracies and plot holes in the Laserblast script. John Kenneth Muir raised several of these issues in his book, Horror Films of the 1970s: "How does Kathy's dad know Craig, the government agent? Why do the aliens leave behind the rifle and the pendant in the first place? Why does the weapon turn its owner into a monstrous green-skinned brute?" Band explained in a 2006 interview that the more Billy uses the gun, "the more it sort of takes over his soul". Janet Maslin, film critic with The New York Times, pointed out that when Billy wakes up at the beginning of the film, it is implied that the preceding scene in the desert was a dream. Later, however, it turns out to have happened after all.

=== Casting ===
Kim Milford, who had previously appeared in the original Broadway theatre production of Hair and the first production of The Rocky Horror Show, starred in the leading role of Laserblast, marking his first major motion picture appearance. Cheryl Smith, who later received greater recognition for her appearances in B movies and exploitation films, appeared in the lead female role of Kathy Farley. Smith disliked the role because she felt it was poorly written and that she did not receive enough rehearsal time. Gianni Russo, best known for playing Carlo Rizzi in The Godfather (1972), was cast as government investigator Tony Craig.

Laserblast marks the screen debut of Eddie Deezen, who went on to play other archetypal nerd roles in films like Grease (1978), which was filmed before Laserblast started production, 1941 (1979), Grease 2 (1982), and Midnight Madness (1980). During a 2009 interview, Deezen remembered little about Laserblast, other than that it was a "shoddy production". Roddy McDowall portrays Dr. Mellon in the film, whose name is misspelled "McDowell" in the end credits. Keenan Wynn, a long-time character actor and a Metro-Goldwyn-Mayer contract player during the 1940s, portrayed Colonel Farley, who provides comic relief as Kathy's crazed, paranoid, delusional grandfather and veteran. The filming for Wynn's small role was finished in one day. Screenwriter Franne Schacht made a cameo appearance as the sheriff's secretary in the film.

=== Production ===
Steve Neill handled the film's makeup effects, including the gradual degeneration of Kim Milford's character.

Laserblast was directed by Michael Rae, marking his only directorial credit. Filming took place over three weekends and was made "for virtually no money", according to producer Band. The makeup effects in the film, including the gradual discoloration and degeneration of Kim Milford, were handled by makeup artist Steve Neill, who had previously worked with Band on the science fiction film End of the World (1977). Neill makes a cameo appearance in Laserblast as the mutated man who was killed by the aliens in the opening scene. Neill introduced Band to David W. Allen, the film animator who created the stop motion alien creatures in Laserblast. When Band and Neill met, the former was working full-time on his fantasy film The Primevals, which was ultimately never completed. Band had developed an interest and familiarity with animation, particularly the works of Ray Harryhausen, and wanted Allen to animate the reptilian creatures for his film. Although eager to work on The Primevals, Allen said he was not yet "sufficiently mature professionally" to undertake a project of that size, and he felt Laserblast was "something that was more manageable". Band and Allen would go on to work together on several other films and projects over the next 20 years.

The alien creatures were featured in 39 cuts of the film through five scenes. The first scene was in the beginning of the film where the aliens emerge from their spacecraft into the desert to shoot Neill's character. Two matte set-ups were used for effects, including one used to create the illusion of depth with Neill's character in the foreground and the aliens in the background. The sequence where Neill's character shoots the gun out of the hand of one of the aliens was done through wire-supported animation. In the second and third sequences, the two aliens are on board their spaceship, which is a miniature set designed by Dave Carson. The aliens speak with their commander through a monitor in the second sequence, and animations of the alien commander were shot separately and implemented into the scene using a rear projection effect. Both sequences also used rear projection to show footage of Billy and his destruction on Earth. The fourth sequence shows the aliens on Earth, looking at a burnt-out car destroyed by Billy. Footage of the car was rear projected behind the alien models; however, the projected footage was shot at night and the scene took place between two daytime live-action scenes, thus creating a continuity error in the film. The final scene is the shortest, and features a confrontation between the aliens and Billy. Matting was again used for the sequence where Billy is shot with a gun by one of the aliens from the top of a building. The aliens then fly off in their spaceship at the end of the scene through a cutout animation effect.

Randall William Cook, an animator who worked with Allen on the horror film The Crater Lake Monster (1977), provided uncredited animation work on Laserblast. Sculptor Jon Berg, who built the alien creature puppets based on Allen's design, was also uncredited for his work. Allen said in a 1993 article that he and Berg created more shots in the film "than originally bargained for". Special effects were assisted by Harry Woolman, and laser effects were provided by Paul Gentry. Greg Jein, the special effects model-maker who also worked on The Crater Lake Monster, designed and built the spacecraft featured in Laserblast. Jein had recently completed his work on the Close Encounters of the Third Kind (1977) when Allen approached him to work on Laserblast, which was the first time that Jein designed a project himself. He prepared several concept sketches and, after one was selected, he constructed the 18-inch model (46 cm) in two weeks. Allen ultimately felt his animation sequences in Laserblast were not properly integrated with the rest of the film.

Joel Goldsmith and Richard Band, the brother of film producer Charles Band, composed the music for Laserblast, marking the first film score for both composers. The score was written in five days, and makes heavy use of synthesizer, particularly synthesized brass instruments, as well as electronic music. The music was also used in the Charles Band-produced film Auditions, released the same year, as well as the 1983 horror film The House on Sorority Row, and the 1986 science fiction film Robot Holocaust. The company Echo Film Services handled the sound effects. The alien language chatter between the aliens in Laserblast was later used for sound effects in the metal band Static-X's song "A Dios Alma Perdida", which is featured in their 2001 album Machine. Several times when something explodes after it is shot by the laser gun, the scene is edited so that multiple shots of the same explosion are shown in succession. This type of editing became a trademark of Charles Band's films, and was done previously in his 1977 films Crash! and End of the World.

== Release ==
The film was distributed by the Irwin Yablans Company, and released on March 1, 1978. Irwin Yablans, who later produced the first three Halloween films, specialized primarily in distributing B movies and low-budget horror films. Laserblast was advertised in conjunction with End of the World, which had been released the previous year and was still playing in theaters at the time. When Laserblast was released, audience interest in science fiction films was particularly high due to the release of Star Wars.

=== Reception ===
If Steven Spielberg advanced the likelihood of intelligent extra-terrestrial life in Close Encounters Of The Third Kind, then Charles Band sets it back 20 years with his production of Laserblast.

— Variety magazine, March 8, 1978

Laserblast has received largely negative reviews, and consistently ranks among the Bottom 100 list of films on the Internet Movie Database. A 1978 critique in The Review of the News said, "The only thing eerie about Laserblast is the thought that the people who made this loser are still running around loose." In the review, Laserblast was described as "an incomprehensible blending" of popular recent films like Star Wars and Close Encounters of the Third Kind, with a script that was "so disordered we could not be certain that the reels were being run in proper sequence". It also criticized the props, particularly the laser gun, which they compared to a cereal box prize. A review by Variety magazine said that the special effects were decent, but that the script "has more holes than the laser-ravaged landscape". Janet Maslin of The New York Times said that Kim Milford's performance was dull and that the script included plot holes and inconsistencies. The Los Angeles Times critic Linda Gross said that the script lacked "credibility, psychological motivation and narrative cohesiveness", although she praised Terry Bowen's cinematography, saying it "effectively captures the ambience of desert small-town life". It was described as one of the worst films of the year in the book The Golden Turkey Awards.

Literary critic John Kenneth Muir thought that the script had many plot holes which left many unanswered questions, and that there was "little effort to forge a coherent story out of the mix". New York Daily News writer David Bianculli described Laserblast as "numbingly bad". In The Encyclopedia of Science Fiction Movies, Phil Hardy describes it as "a wholly unimaginative film", adding, "Even the non-stop series of exploding cars becomes monotonous in the hands of director Rae." The Time Out Film Guide described Laserblast as a rip-off of Strange Case of Dr. Jekyll and Mr. Hyde, and said that Billy's reign of destruction seemed random and senseless, rather than driven by plot or characterization. The review called the film "the epitome of what Frank Zappa once hymned as 'cheapness'". The Globe and Mail writer Robert Martin called the script inept, said that Steve Neill's makeup effects were "frightful rather than frightening", and said that Cheryl Smith could "barely talk, let alone act". Martin also stated that the film was pulled from a Toronto theater after showing for one week.

Not all of the reviews were negative. Blockbuster Entertainment gave the film three out of five stars, and film critic Leonard Maltin gave it two-and-a-half out of four stars. In their book about science fiction films, writers James Robert Parish and Michael R. Pitts called Laserblast "a stimulating, unpretentious little film in the same vein as I Was a Teenage Werewolf". Parish and Pitts praised the stop motion animation and the performance of Cheryl Smith. Laserblast was among several films universally considered terrible that film reviewer Michael Adams watched as part of a book about his quest to find the worst film of all time. However, Adams said he enjoyed watching it on a B-movie level. Monthly Film Bulletin said that Laserblast was "Band's first major box-office success on the exploitation circuit". According to Space.com, Laserblast has achieved cult film status. During a 2005 interview, Charles Band called the film "hilarious" and stated that "it had its charm" like many films from its time. He also said that the film would have been made differently and would have had less critical reactions if it had been produced with a larger budget.

The stop motion aliens, created by David W. Allen, were praised by some critics as the only positive aspect of the film.

Several critical reviews cited the stop motion animation as one of the film's only redeeming qualities. Richard Meyers, a novelist who also wrote about science fiction films, described Laserblast as "basically repetitive and predictable", but included some redemptive qualities in the animation of Dave Allen and the makeup effects of Steve Neill. Science fiction literary scholar Peter Nicholls called it the worst of Charles Band's films, saying it was "badly scripted, badly paced rubbish", and describing Allen's "o.k. aliens" as "the only plus". Likewise, film essayist Dennis Fischer said that Allen's stop motion animation provides the film's "sole moments of interest", and Cinefex publisher Don Shay called it the film's "only viable selling points". In their book DVD & Video Guide, Mick Martin and Marsha Porter called it a "dreadful low-budget film with some excellent special effects by David Allen". Doug Pratt, who criticized the poor acting and dull dialogue, said that the special effects and stop motion animation "are well executed, but the sequences without effects are fairly dumb". The authors of The DVD-Laser Disc Newsletter called the film "a dull and padded revenge-against-bullies tale", but said that the stop motion animation sequences were enjoyable enough that "fans are likely to be pleased with the low-budget film's positive attributes and willing to ignore the rest".

==== Accolades ====
Year	Award	Category	Recipients	Result	Ref.
2003 (1978 expanded ballot)	Stinkers Bad Movie Awards	Worst Picture	Laserblast (Irwin Yablans Company)	Dishonourable Mention	
2003 (1978 expanded ballot)	Stinkers Bad Movie Awards	Worst Director	Michael Rae	Dishonourable Mention	
2003 (1978 expanded ballot)	Stinkers Bad Movie Awards	Worst Actor	Kim Milford	Nominated	
2003 (1978 expanded ballot)	Stinkers Bad Movie Awards	Worst Supporting Actor	Eddie Deezen	Dishonourable Mention	
2003 (1978 expanded ballot)	Stinkers Bad Movie Awards	Worst On-Screen Group	The aliens who seem to be appearing in a different movie	Dishonourable Mention	

=== Home media ===
Laserblast was initially released on home video in 1981 from Media Home Entertainment. It was released on LaserDisc on June 30, 1993, by Shadow Entertainment, and was re-released on VHS on November 25, 1997, by Full Moon Entertainment, a distribution company started by Charles Band. It had a second VHS re-release on October 9, 1998, by United American Home Video. Laserblast was released on DVD on July 6, 1999, again by Full Moon Entertainment. The picture was presented with an aspect ratio of 1.66:1 and stereophonic sound. The disc included no captions and no special features, except for cast profiles and trailers for other Full Moon films. Doug Pratt, a DVD reviewer and Rolling Stone contributor, said the visual presentation was better than most films from its time, with fresh colors and only a few speckles, as well as a decent sound transfer. In August 2018, a Blu-ray disc of the film was released by Full Moon Pictures. The disc presented a newly made high-definition video scan from an interpositive film element. On the commentary track, Band states that the film's original negative has been lost.

=== Soundtrack ===
The original motion picture soundtrack was released as a limited edition CD by BSX Records on August 1, 2005. It consists of about 46 minutes of music over 25 tracks. SoundtrackNet reviewer Mike Brennan said that it was "actually quite enjoyable in parts", but not the type of music meant to be listened to without the film. Brennan claimed that it resembled some of the later and better-known works of Joel Goldsmith, like the scores of Stargate SG-1 and Stargate Atlantis. Joe Sikoryak of Film Score Monthly gave the soundtrack one-and-a-half stars out of five, claiming that about one-third of the album sounded like "generic rock 'n' roll cues for a production unable to afford licensing existing songs".

=== Sequel ===
Band originally planned to produce a sequel called Laserblast II, with production work to begin in August 1986 and a theatrical release expected to follow shortly thereafter. A tagline released for the film read "The ultimate alien weapon is back." When plans for the sequel were announced, Atlanta-based film critic Scott Journal wrote "I am one of the few people in the world who saw the original and, believe me, it did not merit a followup." However, Charles Band Productions fell into financial difficulties shortly after the production of Laserblast, and the project was eventually scrapped. However, the premise and elements of the abandoned sequel were later used in the 1988 Charles Band film Deadly Weapon, which, like Laserblast, was about a bullied teenager who finds a powerful weapon and uses it to seek revenge against his enemies. Band continued to make films and eventually formed Empire Pictures.

== Mystery Science Theater 3000 ==
A pathetic androgynous blond kid from the California desert finds a ray-gun left by fat-assed aliens in the sagebrush, is harassed by strangely southern, dope-smoking cops, develops a large hole in his chest, kills Roddy McDowall, and eventually dies himself. Meanwhile, nothing happens. The aliens are the best thing in the film: they're cute. Eddie Deezen rounds out the cast as the hurtful geek.

— The Mystery Science Theater 3000 Amazing Colossal Episode Guide

Laserblast was featured in the seventh-season finale episode of Mystery Science Theater 3000.

Laserblast was featured in the seventh-season finale (episode #706) of Mystery Science Theater 3000, a comedy television series. In the show, the human character Mike Nelson and his two robot friends, Crow T. Robot and Tom Servo, are trapped in a satellite and forced to watch bad films as part of an ongoing scientific experiment. Laserblast was the sixth episode of the seventh season, which was broadcast May 18, 1996, on Comedy Central. It marked the final original episode of Mystery Science Theater 3000 on that network, before the series moved to the Sci-Fi Channel for its eighth season. Mary Jo Pehl, an actress and writer for the show, felt that Laserblast was a particularly bad film: "The lead guy, Kim Somebody, is another sterling example of how filmmaking is not a meritocracy. The fact that this film was even made proves that 'anybody can do it.' You can find this either inspiring or depressing."

During the riffing, the robot character Crow T. Robot claims the film "was run through a highly technical process called 'tension extraction'", and the other robot Tom Servo calls it so dull, "There's a point where it stops being a movie." Mike and the robots make particular note of film critic Leonard Maltin's relatively high two-and-a-half star rating of the original film. The episode also makes several references to McDowall's performances in the Planet of the Apes films, and several jokes at the expense of Deezen and his stereotypically nerdy character, at one point dubbing him the "heir to the Arnold Stang fortune". Mike and the robots repeatedly sang "Are You Ready for Some Football?" when Deputy Ungar appears onscreen due to actor Dennis Burkley's resemblance to country singer Hank Williams Jr.

Dan Cziraky of Cinefantastique wrote, "If you've never seen Laserblast, this is perfect MST3K viewing! It typifies everything wrong with the late '70s." Paste writer Jim Vorel ranked the episode at #53 out of 191 MST3K episodes from the first twelve seasons; he called Laserblast "a real piece of zero-budget garbage that is made only worse by its arrogant aspirations," and he writes the movie "combines the worst aspects of shirtless '70s slackerism with a protagonist who is slowly driven insane." During a 2009 interview, Deezen said he loved the show's parody of Laserblast.

Shout! Factory released the episode on November 18, 2008, as part of the MST3K: 20th Anniversary Edition DVD set. The set also included three other episodes: First Spaceship On Venus (episode #112), Future War (episode (#1004), and Werewolf (episode #904).

== Merchandise ==
On October 13, 2017, Eibon Press published a comic book adaptation of Laserblast. Under their VHS Comics sub-imprint, it was released alongside an adaptation of the 1980 slasher film Maniac.

An action figure was released based on the alien from the film, available on Full Moon Direct and Amazon.
