= Carlo Rizzi =

Carlo Rizzi may refer to:

- Carlo Rizzi (conductor) (born 1960), Italian conductor
- Carlo Rizzi (The Godfather), a fictional character in the novel The Godfather
