= Tim Herbert =

American actor, comedian and vaudevillian (1914–86)

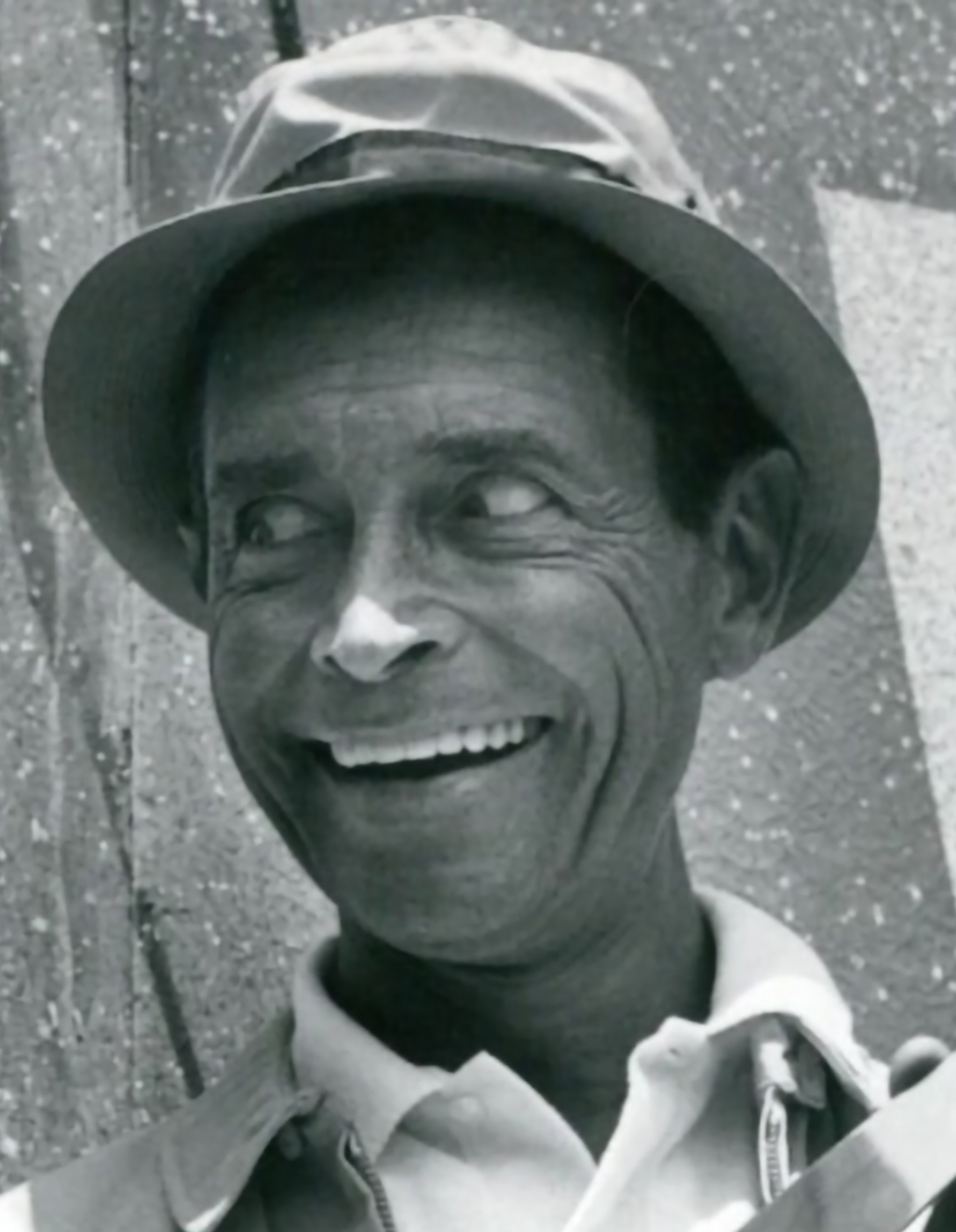
- Herbert in 1968
- Born: Herbert Timberg; June 22, 1914; New York City, U.S.
- Died: June 20, 1986 (aged 71); Los Angeles, California, U.S.
- Occupations: Actor, comedian, vaudevillian
- Years active: 1936–1986

Tim Herbert (Herman Timberg, Jr., born Herbert Timberg; June 22, 1914 – June 20, 1986) was an American actor, comedian and vaudevillian.

== Timberg and Rooney ==
Tim Herbert was born Herbert Timberg in New York, son of the vaudeville actor and songwriter Herman Timberg, who often appeared on stage with another show-business veteran, dancer Pat Rooney. The elders Timberg and Rooney worked their sons into the act. The younger Timberg and Rooney hit it off personally and professionally, and worked up their own act, incorporating dancing and comedy. To capitalize on their association with their fathers, they billed themselves as "Herman Timberg, Jr. and Pat Rooney, Jr." ("Pat Rooney, Jr." was really the professional name of Pat Rooney III.)

Beginning in 1936 Timberg, Jr. and Rooney, Jr. co-starred in 10 musical-comedy short subjects for New York-based Educational Pictures. The tall Timberg and the short Rooney had developed excellent comedy timing from their years in vaudeville, and each of their films included their own dance specialties. Educational even promoted them as "the old Mike and Ike combination" (vaudeville parlance for an Irish comedian opposite a Jewish comedian). The films were well received by trade reviewers and audiences. Their debut short Bashful Buddies (1936) was reviewed by The Exhibitor: "Herman Timberg, Jr. and Pat Rooney the third make a good team. With some dance hits, some good comedy from Timberg and Rooney, this ought to please." The new team scored a hit with a South Dakota showman: "This is a real comedy. Laughs throughout to the very end. Clever and snappy acting makes this one of the outstanding comedies of the year. Best we ran this year, and that is a lot to say." The immediate follow-up, Rah! Rah! Rhythm, won a rave from Motion Picture Herald: "[Timberg and Rooney] will develop into a screen comedy team of the first order. These young men bring to the short subject field confidence, assurance, and ability readily translated into entertainment."

The series lapsed in late 1937 when the financially troubled studio suspended production; the last two Timberg & Rooney comedies, Meet the Bride and Love and Onions, were released in early 1938, shortly before Educational closed its doors. Timberg tried his luck as a producer of a stage revue, but when it closed Timberg returned to vaudeville and personal appearances with Rooney through 1940. Pat Rooney, Jr. retired temporarily to a New Hampshire farm, leaving Timberg to pursue a solo career.

== Tim Herbert ==
In the 1940s, Timberg adopted the stage name Tim Herbert, which he retained for the rest of his career. He was featured in vaudeville and in Broadway productions, including the revue Follow the Girls. In the 1950s he formed a double act with comedian Don Saxon, and they appeared in nightclubs and on television. During the 1960s Herbert established himself as a character actor in films and television. He appeared on The Dick Van Dyke Show (in the episode "Bupkis," as an anxious songwriter) and on The Addams Family, The Lucy Show, Get Smart, and other high-profile series. He also appeared as "Whiskers" in two episodes of Batman, as well as playing the villain Killer Moth in an unaired short episode in 1967, which was primarily filmed to introduce Batgirl into the series. Herbert also played incidental roles in motion pictures, including Don't Worry, We'll Think of a Title, The Boston Strangler, They Shoot Horses, Don't They?, Duel, and Win, Place or Steal, and in television films like Ellery Queen: Don't Look Behind You, Goodnight, My Love, and Terror on the 40th Floor.

Herbert died of a heart attack on June 20, 1986, in Los Angeles, California.

== Filmography ==
Year	Title	Role	Notes
1936-1938	Short subjects with Pat Rooney, Jr.	Herman	starring series
1966	Don't Worry, We'll Think of a Title	Seed / Samu	
1967	A Guide for the Married Man	Shoe Clerk	
1967	The Ambushers	Gil	Uncredited
1968	The Boston Strangler	Cedric	
1969	They Shoot Horses, Don't They ?	Doctor	
1970	But I Don't Want to Get Married!	Principal	
1971	Duel	Gas Station Attendant	
1972	Goodnight, My Love	Sam	
1973	Soylent Green	Brady	
1973	The F.B.I.	Sam Lerner	Episode: "The Big Job"
1974	Terror on the 40th Floor	Building Manager	
1974	Earthquake	Las Vegas Man	
1974	Win, Place or Steal	Teller #1	
