= Kim Milford =

American singer-songwriter (1951–1988)

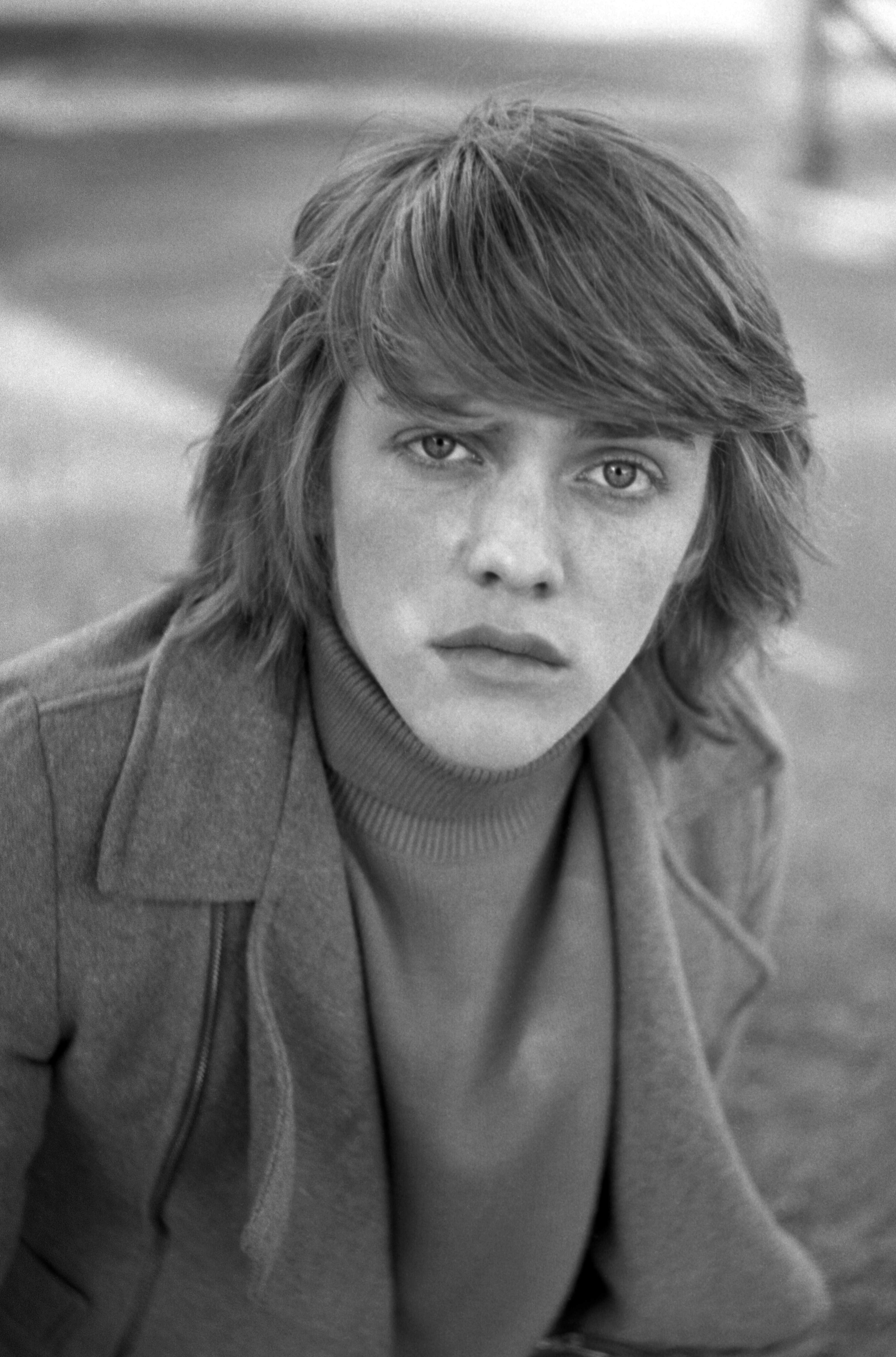
- Milford in 1969
- Born: Richard Kim Milford; February 7, 1951; Glen Ridge, New Jersey, U.S.
- Died: June 16, 1988 (aged 37); Chicago, Illinois, U.S.
- Education: New Trier High School
- Occupations: Actor; singer-songwriter; composer
- Relatives: Penelope Milford (sister)

Richard Kim Milford (February 7, 1951 – June 16, 1988), known professionally as Kim Milford, was an American actor, singer-songwriter, and composer. He was known for his stage acting in musicals such as The Rocky Horror Show and Jesus Christ Superstar.

== Early life ==
Born in Glen Ridge, New Jersey, Milford grew up in Winnetka, Illinois. His older sister, Penelope, also became an actress. Milford attended New Trier High School.

== Career ==
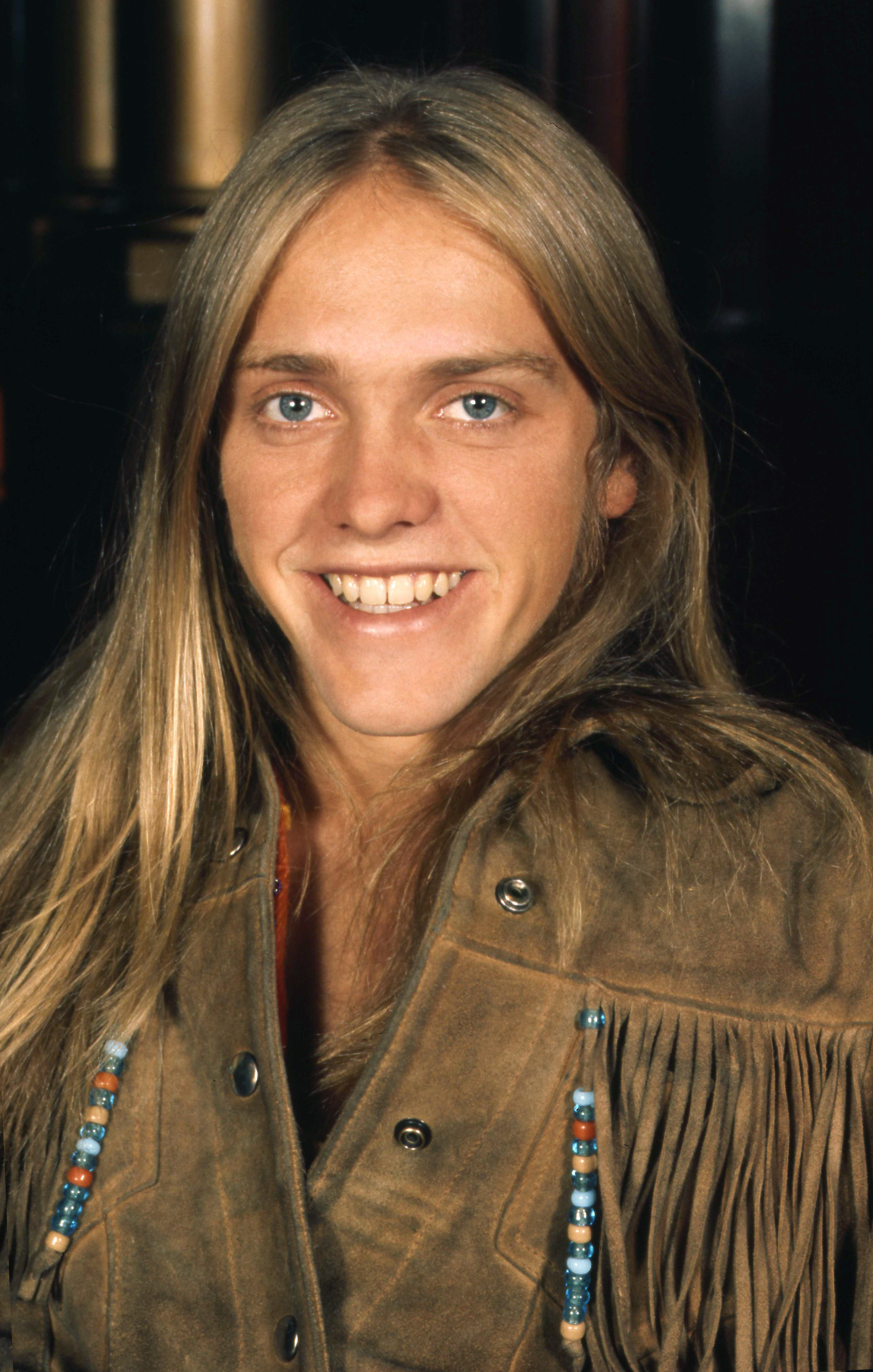
Milford in 1972.

=== Acting ===
Milford first appeared at the stock theatre in Chicago at age 10. At age 17, he was in the original stage version of Hair on Broadway, playing Woof and Claude. In 1971, he appeared at The Kennedy Center in Leonard Bernstein's Mass. In 1976, he was awarded the Faith and Freedom Award by the Religious Heritage of America for his portrayal of the Prodigal Son in Round Trip. Milford later performed in the first concert tour of Jesus Christ Superstar playing Jesus and Judas. He also appeared in the original American production of The Rocky Horror Show as Rocky with the Los Angeles Roxy Cast and in the Broadway production. He reprised his role in the 1980 North American Tour production. He also appeared in the plays Henry Sweet Henry (1967), Your Own Thing, Rockabye Hamlet (1975–76), More Than You Deserve, Sunset, and All Bets Off.

In addition to stage work, Milford appeared in the 1975 television movies Song of the Succubus and Rock-a-Die-Baby (also known as Night of the Full Moon) in which he performed music with his band Moon. During the 1970s and 1980s, he had guest roles on The Mod Squad, Mannix, The Highwayman, he also starred in the 1978 feature film Laserblast and appeared in Corvette Summer alongside Mark Hamill. He also had a recurring role as Tommy on the soap opera The Secret Storm.

=== Music ===
Milford briefly became vocalist for Beck, Bogert & Appice, billed as The Jeff Beck Group, for six performances between July 24 to August 8, 1972. It was billed as the Jeff Beck Group, because, at the time, the band also included holdover Max Middleton on piano. Following Middleton's departure and Milford's firing, the trio was known as Beck, Bogert & Appice (Middleton joined the British band Hummingbird). Milford was also the front man for his own band Moon who were co-writers on songs such as "Lovin' Lady", "Jo Anna" and "She's Puttin' Me Through Changes". According to an interview in Viva, Milford recorded an album Chain Your Lovers to the Bedposts and a single "Help Is on the Way, Rozea" released in 1974. He recorded the single "Muddy River Water" for (Decca Records), the Sunset soundtrack and appeared on the Roxy cast album of Rocky Horror Show.

Milford composed the music for Salome, based on the Oscar Wilde play and starred in it at Mark Taper Forum in Los Angeles in 1979. He wrote and performed "My Love Is a Rebel" on the soundtrack of Limbo, starring Barry Bostwick. His song "Justice" appeared on the Ciao! Manhattan soundtrack.

== Death ==
Milford was born with several congenital heart defects that required surgery throughout his life. On June 16, 1988, he died of complications following open heart surgery several weeks earlier. He was 37 years old.

== Discography ==
=== Albums ===
- Chain Your Lovers to the Bedposts

Rocky Horror Show

- Rocky Horror Show Original Los Angeles Cast (1974)
- Rocky Horror Picture Show 15th Anniversary (1990)
- Rocky Horror Collection Original Soundtrack (1997)
- Rocky Horror Collection Original Soundtrack (2005)

=== Singles ===
- "Help is on the Way, Rozea"
- "Muddy River Water"
- "Justice"

== Filmography ==
Year	Title	Role	Notes
1971	The Mod Squad	Johnny	episode: "Kicks Incorporated"
1974	Mannix	Chris Lockwood	episode: "Portrait in Blues"
1975	Rock-A-Die, Baby		TV movie
1975	Song of the Succubus	Himself	TV movie
1975	Sunshine	Eric	episode: "Leave It to Weaver"
1978	Laserblast	Billy Duncan	
1978	Corvette Summer	Wayne Lowry	alternative title: The Hot One
1978	Bloodbrothers	Bobby Butler	alternative title: A Father's Love
1986	Crime Story	Babe Petro	episode: "Pilot"
1986	Wired to Kill	Rooster	alternative title: Booby Trap
1988	Nightmare at Noon	Albino's Henchman #4	alternative title: Death Street USA
1990	Escape	Zoka	released posthumously
