= Goodnight, My Love =

- Genre: Comedy; Crime; Mystery
- Written by: Peter Hyams
- Directed by: Peter Hyams
- Starring: Richard Boone; Barbara Bain; Michael Dunn; Victor Buono; Gianni Russo
- Theme music composer: Harry Betts
- Country of origin: United States
- Original language: English

Production
- Producer: Ward Sylvester
- Production locations: The Culver Theatre, 9820 Washington Boulevard, Culver City, California; 20th Century Fox Studios - 10201 Pico Blvd., Century City, Los Angeles, California; Santa Anita Park, Arcadia, California
- Cinematography: Earl Rath
- Editor: James Mitchell
- Running time: 74 minutes
- Production company: ABC Circle Films

Original release
- Network: ABC
- Release: October 17, 1972

Goodnight, My Love is a 1972 American television mystery film directed by Peter Hyams and starring Richard Boone, Barbara Bain and Michael Dunn.

== Plot ==
In 1946, Los Angeles Susan Lakely hires private detectives Francis Hogan and Arthur Boyle when her boyfriend Michael Tarlow does not call for four days. Upon visiting his apartment the detectives are attacked by an unknown assailant, who flees. They press Susan for more information about her boyfriend's associates but she claims to be unaware of the nature of his business. After questioning numerous people at the horse track they visit a nightclub and speak with Julius Limeway, who is also searching for Tarlow. Together the detectives must see through Susan's lies and discover the truth behind Tarlow's disappearance.

== Cast ==
- Richard Boone as Francis Hogan
- Michael Dunn as Arthur Boyle
- Barbara Bain as Susan Lakely
- Victor Buono as Julius Limeway
- Gianni Russo as Michael Tarlow
- John Quade as Edgar
- Walter Burke as Wheezer
- Lou Wagner as Sally
- Lou Cutell as Sidney
- John Lawrence as Reardon
- Don Calfa as Bananas
- Luke Andreas as Nightman
- Vic Vallaro as Courier
- Jan Daley as Nightclub Singer
- Carlo Rizzo as Eddie
- Bobby Baum as Benny
- Tim Herbert as Sam
- George Brenlin as Barney
- Sylvia J. Habush as Annie
- Paul 'Mousie' Garner as Harry
- James Espinoza as Manuel
- Larry Gorodkin as Parking Lot Attendant
- Lomax Study as Maitre'D
- Ron Boutwell as Pool Player
- Newton Mitzman as Droopy
- Bob Corso as Charlie
- James Nusser as Night Clerk

== Production ==
Hyams had just made T.R. Baskin, which he produced and had written the script but did not direct. He was finding it difficult to get the chance to direct a feature film so moved into television. "It was at a time when television was considered like a bath of sulfuric acid, and if you stuck your toe in it you'd pull out a stump," he says.

He later recalled:

Barry Diller was head of Movies of the Week at that point over at ABC. Barry green-lit Duel for Steven Spielberg, a movie called Binary for Michael Crichton, and gave a lot of us our first breaks. I said to Barry 'I've got two ideas. The first is about the U.S. government faking a moon shot, then trying to cover it up.' He said "What's the other one?" I said, 'I'm a Raymond Chandler freak. I want to do a 1940s detective story about a private eye and his dwarf sidekick.' He said "Do that one."

The film starred Richard Boone and Michael Dunn. Hyams:

Richard Boone was a terrific actor. He had one of the most amazing faces. He, uh, liked to drink a bit. (laughs) I remember the first shot he did for me; we literally had to prop him up. But when we cut it all together, it worked great ... Michael was one of the most gifted people I ever met, just a remarkable man. He also sang like an angel ... He was in terrible pain constantly. It was a real gift to have made my first movie with him. I wish we could have done more.

== Reception ==
The Los Angeles Times called the film "marvelously funny ... admirably written and directed by Peter Hyams with just the right touch." The New York Times called it "delightful".

Hyams later said the film was "over-praised. One of the trades called it the Citizen Kane of television movies, which, trust me, it wasn't." However it did launch his career.
