= Gianni Russo =

American actor (born 1943)

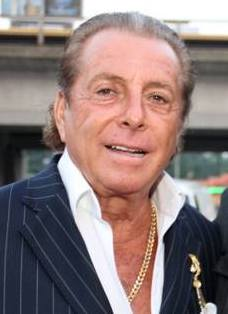
- Russo at the 2013 Life Film Fest
- Born: Louis Gianni Vito Russo; December 12, 1943 (age 82); Manhattan, New York, U.S.
- Occupation: Actor
- Years active: 1972–present
- Website: giannirusso.com

Gianni Vito Russo (born December 12, 1943) is an American actor. He is best known for his role as Carlo Rizzi in the 1972 film The Godfather.

== Life and career ==
Russo was born in Manhattan on December 12, 1943 and raised in Little Italy and Rosebank, Staten Island. After reprising Carlo Rizzi in a brief flashback scene at the end of The Godfather Part II, Russo acted in more than 46 films, including Goodnight, My Love (1972), Lepke (1975, as Albert Anastasia), Laserblast (1978), Chances Are (1989), The Freshman (1990), Side Out (1990), Another You (1991), Super Mario Bros. (1993), Any Given Sunday (1999) and Seabiscuit (2003).

Russo claims that he started a fledgling career in organized crime working as an errand boy and mob associate for Frank Costello as an adolescent but later abandoned the dangerous and volatile lifestyle of organized crime. The Staten Island Mafioso Tommy Bilotti was best man at Russo's wedding.

Since the beginning of his acting career, Russo owned a Las Vegas restaurant called Gianni Russo's State Street at 2570 State Street in the Commercial Center (closed in 1988), and claims he defeated 23 federal criminal indictments on a variety of charges stemming from alleged organized crime associations.

In 1988, Russo killed a man inside the Las Vegas nightclub. When he tried to intervene to stop a man from harassing a female patron, the man stabbed him with a broken champagne bottle. Russo, a legal-carry owner, pulled his gun and shot him in the head. The man was a 30-year-old Cuban national. Russo was not charged with the killing because it was ruled a justifiable homicide by the Nevada District Attorney's Office.

Russo is also a singer. In 2004, he released a CD called Reflections that pays homage to Dean Martin and Frank Sinatra.

Russo owns a wine brand, Gianni Russo Wines, which debuted in 2009.

In 2019, he published his memoir, Hollywood Godfather: My Life in the Movies and the Mob.

== Filmography ==
=== Film and television ===
| Year | Title | Role | Notes |
|---|---|---|---|
| 1972 | The Godfather | Carlo Rizzi | |
| 1972 | Goodnight, My Love | Michael Tarlow | ABC Movie of the Week |
| 1973 | The Bait | Gianni Ruggeri | ABC Movie of the Week |
| 1974 | The Godfather Part II | Carlo Rizzi | |
| 1975 | Rudeness | Salvatore Mannino | |
| 1975 | Lepke | Albert Anastasia | |
| 1975 | The Four Deuces | Chip Morono - the 'Deuce of Clubs' | |
| 1978 | Laserblast | Tony Craig | |
| 1979 | Winter Kills | Co-Pilot | |
| 1986 | The Return of Mickey Spillane's Mike Hammer | Card Player | TV movie |
| 1989 | Chances Are | Anthony Bonino | |
| 1990 | Side Out | Dick Sydney | |
| 1990 | The Freshman | Maitre D' Gourmet Club | |
| 1991 | Out for Justice | Sammy | |
| 1991 | The Great Pretender | Davey DeSapio | TV movie |
| 1991 | Silverfox | Klaus Gerhardt | TV movie |
| 1991 | Another You | Carlos | |
| 1991 | Perry Mason: The Case of the Fatal Fashion | Marco Sabatini | TV movie |
| 1992 | Stay Tuned | Guido | |
| 1993 | Super Mario Bros. | Anthony Scapelli | |
| 1995 | P.C.H. | Jake Mondello | Video |
| 1996 | Striptease | Willy Rojo | |
| 1997 | Circles | Howard Thomas | |
| 1999 | Any Given Sunday | Christina's Advisor | |
| 2000 | The Family Man | Nick | |
| 2000 | Rope Art | Sen. Bob Krause | |
| 2001 | 3000 Miles to Graceland | Money Cart Guard | |
| 2001 | Harvard Man | Andrew Bandolini | |
| 2001 | Rush Hour 2 | Red Dragon Pit Boss | |
| 2002 | Red Dragon | Newsie | |
| 2003 | Seabiscuit | Alberto Gianini | |
| 2003 | All In | Falcone | Korean television miniseries |
| 2004 | After the Sunset | Clippers Fan | |
| 2005 | Johnny Slade's Greatest Hits | Paul | |
| 2013 | Send No Flowers | Johnny Pisano | |
| 2018 | Con Man | Derek Lewis | |
