= Nessa Hyams =

American casting director (1941–2026)

- Born: November 21, 1941; New York City, U.S.
- Died: January 9, 2026 (aged 84); New York City, U.S.
- Occupation: Casting director
- Relatives: Sol Hurok (grandfather); Peter Hyams (brother)

Nessa Hyams (November 21, 1941 – January 9, 2026) was an American casting director.

== Life and career ==
Hyams was born in New York City on November 21, 1941. She was a casting director, known for working on The Exorcist (1973) and Blazing Saddles (1974). She also worked as a television director on Mary Hartman, Mary Hartman (1976).

Hyams died in New York City on January 9, 2026, at the age of 84.
