= Peter Hyams =

American film director, screenwriter and cinematographer (born 1943)

- Born: July 26, 1943 (age 83); New York City, New York, U.S.
- Occupations: Film director, screenwriter, cinematographer
- Years active: 1971–present
- Spouse: George-Ann Spota (m. 1964)
- Children: 3, including John Hyams
- Relatives: Nessa Hyams (sister)

Peter Hyams (born July 26, 1943) is an American film director, screenwriter and cinematographer known for directing the 1977 conspiracy thriller film Capricorn One (which he also wrote), the 1981 science fiction-thriller Outland, the 1984 science fiction film 2010: The Year We Make Contact (a sequel to Stanley Kubrick's 2001: A Space Odyssey), the 1986 action/comedy Running Scared, the comic book adaptation Timecop, the action film Sudden Death (both starring Jean-Claude Van Damme), and the horror films The Relic and End of Days.

== Biography ==
=== Early life ===
Hyams was born in New York City, New York, the son of Ruth Hurok and Barry Hyams, who was a theatrical producer and publicist on Broadway. His maternal grandfather was Sol Hurok, the Russian Jewish impresario. His stepfather was blacklisted conductor Arthur Lief. His sister was casting director Nessa Hyams. His son, John Hyams, is also a film director.

=== Television ===
Hyams studied art and music at Hunter College and Syracuse University before working as a producer/anchorman for WHDH-TV. During 1966 while working for a CBS owned station in New York, he served three months as a news correspondent in Vietnam. He worked in Boston then in January 1968 he joined WBBM-TV in Chicago as an anchorman and reporter to replace Fahey Flynn. A contemporary report described him as a "glamor type".

During his time with CBS (where he worked from 1964 to 1970), he then began to shoot documentary films.

=== Screenwriter ===
Hyams moved to Los Angeles in 1970 where he sold his first screenplay, T.R. Baskin, to Paramount Pictures in 1971. Herbert Ross directed the film and Hyams produced.

=== Directing ===
Hyams made his directorial debut with an ABC Movie of the Week for Aaron Spelling, Rolling Man (1972) starring Dennis Weaver. Hyams worked on it solely as director, with the script being written by the producers.

Hyams followed it directing another TV movie which he also wrote, Goodnight, My Love (1972), about a private eye and a dwarf. The film was highly acclaimed.

Hyams optioned a novel Going All the Way which he intended to adapt and direct but it was not made.

The praise for Goodnight My Love meant Hyams was able to get finance for his debut feature as writer-director, Busting (1974), a buddy cop movie starring Elliott Gould and Robert Blake. He followed it with Our Time (1974), a romance with Pamela Sue Martin, which he directed only.

Hyams made Peeper (1975), for the producers of Busting with Michael Caine and Natalie Wood. It was a financial failure and Hyams' career was at a low ebb. He wrote the script Hanover Street which he could have sold outright but Hyams insisted on directing. He wrote the screenplay for the Charles Bronson thriller Telefon (1977), doing a draft for Richard Lester (who ended up not directing the film). It was rewritten extensively.

=== Capricorn One ===
Hyams had written the script for Capricorn One (1977) a number of years earlier. It was a conspiracy thriller about a faked mission to Mars. Paul Lazarus managed to raise financing with Hyams as director and the film was his first hit.

This was followed by the less successful Hanover Street (1979), which starred Harrison Ford.

Hyams did a rewrite of Ted Leighton's screenplay for the Steve McQueen film The Hunter (1980) which he was to direct. However, he dropped out after clashes with McQueen.

He wanted to do a Western but was unable to get financing, so he then wrote and directed the science fiction cult classic Outland (1981), which starred Sean Connery in a 'High Noon' scenario set on Io, one of Jupiter's moons.

Hyams directed the thriller The Star Chamber (1983), starring Michael Douglas, also rewriting the script.

=== MGM ===
For MGM Hyams produced, directed, and wrote the screenplay for 2010 (1984), collaborating closely with author Arthur C. Clarke (2010).

Hyams also co-authored with Clarke The Odyssey File: The Making of 2010, published 1985, a collection of their email correspondence which illustrates their fascination with the then pioneering medium, and its use for them to communicate on an almost daily basis while planning and producing the film.

Hyams directed an episode of Amazing Stories, "The Amazing Falsworth".

Hyams had a hit with a buddy cop film, Running Scared (1986) at MGM with Gregory Hines and Billy Crystal.

He followed it with The Presidio (1988), another buddy action film, starring Sean Connery and Mark Harmon. In between he executive produced the 1980s cult kids movie The Monster Squad (1987).

Less popular was Narrow Margin (1990), a remake of the 1952 film, and the comedy Stay Tuned (1992).

=== Jean-Claude Van Damme ===
Hyams had a big hit with the Jean-Claude Van Damme film Timecop (1994). The director and actor subsequently reteamed on Sudden Death (1995) which did less well.

Hyams did a horror monster movie called The Relic (1997) which received mixed reviews and grossed $48 million at the box office.

The blockbuster End of Days (1999) starring Arnold Schwarzenegger is the highest-grossing film in Hyams' career, grossing over $200 million at the worldwide box-office but was met with negative critical reception.

Hyams followed with The Musketeer (2001), a new version of the novel by Alexandre Dumas, which was a minor box office success.

However, his next film, A Sound of Thunder (2005), a science-fiction movie, had serious difficulties during its production (including the bankruptcy of the original production company during post-production), performed particularly badly at the box office worldwide and was poorly received by critics.

He directed an episode of the series Threshold (2005).

In 2007, it was reported that he would direct the remake of his own Capricorn One; instead, he directed the remake of the 1956 film noir Beyond a Reasonable Doubt starring Michael Douglas, which was released in 2009. It was a box office flop, and panned by critics.

=== Reunion with Van Damme ===
Hyams also contributed the cinematography to his son John's effort, Universal Soldier: Regeneration, the third official Universal Soldier sequel starring Jean-Claude Van Damme and Dolph Lundgren.

Hyams directed the thriller Enemies Closer which began filming in late 2012. It marked his fourth (third directorial) collaboration with Jean-Claude Van Damme.

=== O.J.: Made in America ===
Hyams was interviewed by Ezra Edelman in the latter's documentary O.J.: Made in America, which touched on Hyams' former friendship with O. J. Simpson, whom he had directed in Capricorn One. In his interview, Hyams revealed his initial belief that Simpson was innocent of murdering his ex-wife Nicole Brown Simpson and her friend Ron Goldman, but began to have doubts following the revelation of DNA evidence that suggested otherwise. Hyams said he felt particularly betrayed when Simpson continued to insist that he was innocent when Hyams' friend also began to voice his doubts about Simpson's innocence. Following Simpson's acquittal, Hyams stated that he found the African-American celebration of the acquittal to be particularly offensive and hurtful, and later severed his ties with Simpson.

== Personal life ==
On December 19, 1964, Hyams married George-Ann Spota, with whom he has three sons. His first son, Chris Hyams, was the CEO of the job search website Indeed. His second son, John Hyams, is also a film director; Peter performed cinematography duties on John's film Universal Soldier: Regeneration. His third son, Nick Hyams, works as a battle rap promoter and host under the name Lush One.

== Trademark ==
Hyams is known for being his own cinematographer on the movies he has directed since 1984.

As a reference to his wife's family, there is a minor character named Spota in many of his films, including those which he only wrote (such as 1980's The Hunter); the exceptions being A Sound of Thunder (although there was a market called "Spota's"), End of Days (although there was a bar called "Spota's"), Narrow Margin, Running Scared, 2010, Hanover Street and Peeper. In Hanover Street, Harrison Ford pilots a B-25 bomber named Gorgeous George-Ann.

== Filmography ==
=== Film ===
Year	Title	Director	Writer	Producer	DoP
1971	T.R. Baskin		Yes	Yes	
1974	Busting	Yes	Yes		
1974	Our Time	Yes			
1975	Peeper	Yes			
1977	Capricorn One	Yes	Yes		
1977	Telefon		Yes		
1979	Hanover Street	Yes	Yes		
1980	The Hunter		Yes		
1981	Outland	Yes	Yes		
1983	The Star Chamber	Yes	Yes		
1984	2010: The Year We Make Contact	Yes	Yes	Yes	Yes
1986	Running Scared	Yes			Yes
1988	The Presidio	Yes			Yes
1990	Narrow Margin	Yes	Yes		Yes
1992	Stay Tuned	Yes			Yes
1994	Timecop	Yes			Yes
1995	Sudden Death	Yes			Yes
1997	The Relic	Yes			Yes
1999	End of Days	Yes			Yes
2001	The Musketeer	Yes			Yes
2005	A Sound of Thunder	Yes			Yes
2009	Beyond a Reasonable Doubt	Yes	Yes		Yes
2009	Universal Soldier: Regeneration				Yes
2013	Enemies Closer	Yes			Yes

Executive producer

- Running Scared (1986)
- The Monster Squad (1987)

=== Television ===
TV movies

Year	Title	Director	Writer
1972	Rolling Man	Yes	
1972	Goodnight, My Love	Yes	Yes

TV series

Year	Title	Episode
1985	Amazing Stories	"The Amazing Falsworth"
2005	Threshold	"Trees Made of Glass: Part 2"

Narrator

Year	Title	Episode
2020	Airlines of the World	"American Airlines"

== Awards and nominations ==
Year	Award	Category	Film or series	Result
1978	Edgar Allan Poe Award	Best Motion Picture Screenplay	Telefon	Nominated (Note: Shared with Stirling Silliphant.)
1982	Hugo Award	Best Dramatic Presentation	Outland	Nominated
1982	Saturn Award	Best Writing	Outland	Nominated
1985	Hugo Award	Best Dramatic Presentation	2010: The Year We Make Contact	Won (Note: Shared with Arthur C. Clarke.)
1994	Sitges - Catalonian International Film Festival	Best Film	The Relic	Nominated
2000	Razzie Award	Worst Director	End of Days	Nominated
2005	Stinkers Bad Movie Award	Worst Sense of Direction (Stop them before they direct again!)	A Sound of Thunder	Nominated
