= Rolling Man =

- Written by: Elinor Karpf; Stephen Karpf
- Directed by: Peter Hyams
- Starring: Dennis Weaver; Don Stroud; Donna Mills; Agnes Moorehead
- Theme music composer: Murray MacLeod; Stuart Margolin
- Country of origin: United States
- Original language: English

Production
- Producers: Elinor Karpf; Stephen Karpf; Aaron Spelling
- Cinematography: Earl Rath
- Editors: Donald W. Ernst; Dick Wormell
- Running time: 73 minutes
- Production company: ABC Circle Films
- Budget: $450,000

Original release
- Network: ABC
- Release: October 4, 1972

Rolling Man is a 1972 American made-for-television drama film directed by Peter Hyams in his directorial debut. It premiered on ABC as the ABC Movie of the Week on October 4, 1972.

== Plot ==
Lonnie, a former star athlete in high school, now works for low pay as a tow truck driver on a racetrack. When he spots his wife, Crystal, rendezvousing with Harold Duncan, a stock car driver, at a bar he attempts to force her to come home but she leaves with Harold instead. Lonnie chases them down the road in his truck and their car rolls over down a hillside while driving away and catches fire. Lonnie attempts to rescue his wife from the blazing vehicle but fails. In his anger he beats Harold's head in with the car's bumper.

He is taken away from his two sons and sent to prison for four years for the assault. His cellmate teaches him how to run gimmicks in prison, and he begins recording personalized love songs on vinyl for other inmates. He gets prison tattoos of his sons' names in a heart and Crystal's name in a rose on his right arm and a lucky symbol on his left arm. Upon his release he finds that his newspaper clippings from high school are no longer being displayed in town.

He visits Crystal's grandmother, with whom he left his sons, but she does not recognize him and calls him "Larry", the name of her other grandson. Lonnie asks about his sons but she explains that she has suffered a stroke and was forced to sell Lonnie's things from his trailer and give the children to her cousin Slye, and his wife. Her cousin has lost his job and moved his wife and Lonnie's sons across the country. He spends a night drinking and dancing with Bebe Lotter, an old acquaintance from the racetrack who also performed once at the prison, and asks her to put in a good word for him to get a different job at the racetrack. She is hurt by the question because of her feelings for him, and sends him away, but he convinces her to help him find his sons and she lets him stay the night with her, promising to always be there for him.

Bebe gets Lonnie work driving in the stock car races, but he wrecks the car in the first race and ends up owing money to the car's owner as well as several people with whom he made bets. He quickly escapes the racetrack and hitchhikes out of town. He stops at a diner where the bored waitress takes pity on him, and gives him a free meal while telling him the story of her own failed dream to become an actress. She takes him home for the night, but knows that he will not stay.

Lonnie calls his old employer, Chuck, on New Year's Day and Chuck tells him that Bebe is upset and has been looking for him. Chuck also says that Lonnie's grandmother received a letter from Mildred Slye, and gives Lonnie the return address in Amarillo, Texas. Lonnie hitchhikes there and finds Mildred, but she explains that along the way while she was moving west, she gave the children to a couple of roving fruit pickers, The Maynards, who were heading toward California to pick oranges. Lonnie hitchhikes to California and searches every orange grove, until he finds Wilbur Maynard, but Wilbur explains that the boys ran away three weeks earlier.

Lonnie leaves, angrily crying that he doesn't deserve to be happy. Bebe finds him there, and takes him back with her, and she makes missing posters for the kids while he laments his situation, and decides to finally kill Harold over it. He hitchhikes back to the racetrack, and uses a gun to force Harold into a stock car. He holds Harold at gunpoint as Harold drives around the track explaining his perspective on the situation with Crystal, and apologizing for what happened. Lonnie sees Harold's weakness and decides not to kill him. Bebe catches up with him, bringing with her his sons she has found in the meantime.

== Cast ==
- Dennis Weaver as Lonnie McAfee
- Don Stroud as Harold Duncan
- Donna Mills as Bebe Lotter
- Jimmy Dean as Lyman Hawkes
- Sheree North as Ruby
- Slim Pickens as Chuck
- Agnes Moorehead as Grandmother
- Linda Gaye Scott as Crystal
- Devra Korwin as Mildred Slye
- Donald Larkin as Lester McAfee
- Connie Mason as Connie

== Production ==
The film was based on a script by Stephen and Elinor Karpf, based on Elinor Karpf's upbringing in Missouri. Barry Diller read the script and approved it in December 1, 1971 - the film started shooting four weeks later on 27 December. The Karpfs produced and got Peter Hyams, who had just made T.R. Baskin, to make his directorial debut.
