= The Godfather =

1972 film by Francis Ford Coppola

- Theatrical release poster
- Directed by: Francis Ford Coppola
- Screenplay by: Mario Puzo; Francis Ford Coppola
- Based on: The Godfather by Mario Puzo
- Produced by: Albert S. Ruddy
- Starring: Marlon Brando; Al Pacino; James Caan; Richard Castellano; Robert Duvall; Sterling Hayden; John Marley; Richard Conte; Diane Keaton
- Cinematography: Gordon Willis
- Edited by: William Reynolds; Peter Zinner
- Music by: Nino Rota
- Production companies: Paramount Pictures; Alfran Productions
- Distributed by: Paramount Pictures
- Release dates: March 14, 1972 (Loew's State Theatre); March 24, 1972 (United States)
- Running time: 175 minutes
- Country: United States
- Language: English
- Budget: $6–7 million (Note: Sources disagree on both the amount of the original budget and the final budget. The starting budget has been recorded as $1 million, $2 million, and $2.5 million, while Coppola later demanded—and received—a $5 million budget. The final budget has been named at $6 million, $6.5 million, $7 million, and $7.2 million.)
- Box office: $250–291 million (Note: Sources disagree on the amount grossed by the film.: 1974: Newsweek. Vol. 84. 1974. p. 74. "The original Godfather has grossed a mind-boggling $285 million..."; 1991: Von Gunden, Kenneth (1991). Postmodern auteurs: Coppola, Lucas, De Palma, Spielberg, and Scorsese. McFarland & Company. p. 36. ISBN 978-0-89950-618-0. "Since The Godfather had earned over $85 million in U.S.-Canada rentals (the worldwide box-office gross was $285 million), a sequel, according to the usual formula, could be expected to earn approximately two-thirds of the original's box-office take (ultimately Godfather II had rentals of $30 million)."; Releases: "The Godfather (1972)". Box Office Mojo. "Original release: $243,862,778; 1997 re-release: $1,267,490; 2009 re-release: $121,323; 2011 re-release: $818,333; 2014 re-release: $29,349; 2018 re-release: $21,701; 2020 re-release: $4,323; 2022 re-release: $3,999,963; Budget: $6,000,000")

The Godfather is a 1972 American epic gangster film directed by Francis Ford Coppola, who co-wrote the screenplay with Mario Puzo based on Puzo's best-selling 1969 novel. The film features an ensemble cast that includes Marlon Brando, Al Pacino, James Caan, Richard Castellano, Robert Duvall, Sterling Hayden, John Marley, Richard Conte and Diane Keaton. It is the first installment in The Godfather trilogy, which chronicles the Corleone family under patriarch Vito Corleone (Brando) and the transformation of his youngest son, Michael Corleone (Pacino), from reluctant family outsider to ruthless Mafia boss.

Paramount Pictures obtained the rights to the novel for $80,000, before it gained popularity. Studio executives had trouble finding a director; the first few candidates turned down the position before Coppola signed on to direct the film, but disagreement followed over casting several characters, in particular Vito (Brando) and Michael (Pacino). Filming took place primarily in locations around New York City and Sicily, and it was completed ahead of schedule. The score was composed principally by Nino Rota, with additional pieces by Carmine Coppola.

The Godfather premiered at the Loew's State Theatre on March 14, 1972, and was widely released in the United States on March 24, 1972. It was the highest-grossing film of 1972, and was for a time the highest-grossing film ever made, earning between $250 and $291 million at the box office. The film was acclaimed by critics and audiences, who praised its performances—particularly those of Brando and Pacino—direction, screenplay, story, cinematography, editing, score, and portrayal of the Mafia. The Godfather launched the successful careers of Coppola, Pacino, and other relative newcomers in the cast and crew. At the 45th Academy Awards, the film won Best Picture, Brando won Best Actor, and Puzo and Coppola won for Best Adapted Screenplay. In addition, the seven other Oscar nominations included Pacino, Caan, and Duvall, all for Best Supporting Actor, and Coppola for Best Director.

The Godfather is regarded as one of the greatest and most influential films ever made, as well as a landmark of the gangster genre. It was selected for preservation in the U.S. National Film Registry of the Library of Congress in 1990, being deemed "culturally, historically, or aesthetically significant" and is ranked the second-greatest film in American cinema (behind Citizen Kane) by the American Film Institute. It was followed by the sequels The Godfather Part II (1974) and The Godfather Part III (1990).

== Plot ==
In the mid-1940s, Michael Corleone is a World War II veteran and the youngest son of Don Vito Corleone. Vito is head of the Corleone mafia family and runs it with his eldest son Santino a.k.a. Sonny and adopted son Tom Hagen, a lawyer who is the family's consigliere. At his sister Connie's wedding to Carlo Rizzi, Michael introduces his family to his girlfriend, Kay Adams. Michael tells Kay stories of his family but makes it clear that he wants no part in his family's business.

Vito fulfils the Sicilian tradition of granting favors on his daughter's wedding day to a succession of hopeful visitors. One is his godson, singer and actor Johnny Fontane, who cannot get an upcoming film role because studio owner and producer Jack Woltz has a grudge against Fontane. Vito sends Hagen to LA to persuade Woltz to relent but Woltz will not budge. Hagen departs and the next morning, Woltz wakes to find the severed head of his prized $600,000 racehorse Khartoum in his bed with him. A terrified Woltz relents and Fontane gets the role.

Approaching Christmas, Michael becomes embroiled in family affairs when Vito is gunned down by two assailants. Vito had earlier refused to offer protection to drug baron Virgil "The Turk" Sollozzo for dealing narcotics in the city. Sollozzo has the support of the Tattaglia family, who garrote notorious Corleone enforcer Luca Brasi when he attempts to become a mole in Sollozzo's operation. While Vito survives the attempt and recovers at the hospital, hot-tempered Sonny takes over the family as acting boss. He has Michael live at the house for his protection, as his successful revenge hit on Tattaglia's son Bruno has led to war between the two gangs. Michael visits his father in hospital to be told that NYPD Captain McCluskey has had Vito's bodyguards ejected from the hospital, clearing the way for a second attempt on Vito's life. Michael visits his father and, realizing his jeopardy, moves him to another hospital room then stands guard outside the hospital. He scares Sollozzo's assassins off but an angry McCluskey returns and breaks Michael's jaw for defying him. Soon after, Hagen arrives with more bodyguards and McCluskey backs down to the lawyer's demands. Being an outsider to the family business and seen as harmless, Michael later proposes a meeting between himself, Sollozzo and McCluskey at which he'll kill them both to keep his father safe. Initially amused, the family approve his plan and have a gun planted at the meeting place: a restaurant. At the meeting, Michael shoots both men dead then flees the country. He takes refuge in his family's native Sicily to escape the NYPD and the ire of the other gangs until the heat dies down. He falls in love with a local woman, Apollonia Vitelli, and marries her.

Back in New York, war has broken out between the Five Families. Sonny discovers that Connie was being abused by Carlo. At first, Sonny pummels Carlo in public and warns him never to touch Connie again. However, after a fierce beating from Carlo, Connie appeals to her family. A furious Sonny sets off for her house but is ambushed and murdered at a highway toll booth. The recovering Vito is told of Sonny's death and orders an end to hostilities with no vengeance. He calls a meeting with the heads of the other New York families and negotiates peace between them all, conceding to a controlled drug trade in return for an end to all vendettas and for Michael's safe return to the US. Meanwhile, Michael survives a hit in Sicily, which instead kills Apollonia via car bombing. He returns to the US, slowly taking over the family business from his father. He marries Kay and promises to legitimize the family's operations within five years.

Michael visits Las Vegas to negotiate a deal with Jewish mobster and casino mogul Moe Greene, under whose protection Fredo, Michael’s other brother, has been living. Michael offers to buy out Greene's stake in the family casinos, but Greene refuses and flaunts his support from Barzini, a rival don. After Moe leaves, Michael reprimands Fredo for defending Greene and warns him never to side against the Family ever again.

After the peace meeting, Vito realizes that Barzini is the mastermind behind Sonny's death, not Tattaglia. He predicts to Michael that a Corleone traitor will reveal himself by offering to broker a meeting between Michael and the Barzinis but will use it to have Michael assassinated. Vito dies of a heart attack while playing with his grandson, Michael's son Anthony. At his funeral, Corleone caporegime Salvatore Tessio asks Michael to meet with Barzini, revealing his betrayal. Michael attends his nephew's baptism to be anointed as his godfather while Michael's hitmen carry out orders, simultaneously assassinating Greene and the heads of the other New York Families. Tessio is led off to be executed for his treachery. Michael extracts a confession from Carlo that he conspired with Barzini to kill Sonny and had abused Connie to lure Sonny into his fatal ambush. Michael berates Carlo, then sends him on an apparently safe car journey where instead Clemenza garrotes him.

At their house, Connie accuses Michael of having Carlo killed. To Kay's relief, Michael denies the accusation, but as she leaves the room to get drinks, the Corleone family capos approach Michael and offer him their allegiance. Kay watches Clemenza kiss Michael's hand and address him as "Don Corleone" before Neri closes the door on her.

== Cast ==
Brando (right) and Pacino as Don Vito and Michael Corleone, respectively

- Marlon Brando as Vito Corleone: crime boss and patriarch of the Corleone family
- Al Pacino as Michael Corleone: Vito's youngest son
- James Caan as Sonny Corleone: Vito's eldest son
- Richard Castellano as Peter Clemenza: a caporegime in the Corleone crime family, Sonny's godfather
- Robert Duvall as Tom Hagen: Corleone consigliere, lawyer, and unofficial adopted member of the Corleone family
- Sterling Hayden as Captain McCluskey: a corrupt police captain on Sollozzo's payroll
- John Marley as Jack Woltz: A Hollywood film producer
- Richard Conte as Emilio Barzini: a crime boss of a rival family
- Al Lettieri as Virgil Sollozzo: a drug boss
- Diane Keaton as Kay Adams Corleone: Michael's girlfriend and, later, second wife
- Abe Vigoda as Salvatore Tessio: a caporegime in the Corleone crime family
- Talia Shire as Connie Corleone: Vito's only daughter
- Gianni Russo as Carlo Rizzi: Connie's abusive husband
- John Cazale as Fredo Corleone: Vito's middle son
- Rudy Bond as Carmine Cuneo: a crime boss of a rival family
- Don Costello as Victor Stracci: a crime boss of a rival family
- Al Martino as Johnny Fontane: a singer and Vito's godson
- Morgana King as Carmela Corleone: Vito's wife
- Lenny Montana as Luca Brasi: Vito's enforcer
- Johnny Martino as Paulie Gatto: a soldier in the Corleone crime family
- Salvatore Corsitto as Amerigo Bonasera: an undertaker
- Richard Bright as Al Neri: Michael's enforcer in the Corleone crime family
- Alex Rocco as Moe Greene: a Jewish mobster and Las Vegas casino proprietor
- Tony Giorgio as Bruno Tattaglia: a rival mobster and Philip Tattaglia's youngest son
- Vito Scotti as Nazorine: a baker and associate of Don Corleone
- Tere Livrano as Theresa Hagen: Tom's wife
- Victor Rendina as Philip Tattaglia: head of the Tattaglia crime family and prostitution crime boss
- Jeannie Linero as Lucy Mancini: Connie's friend and Sonny's mistress
- Julie Gregg as Sandra Corleone: Sonny's wife
- Ardell Sheridan as Mrs. Clemenza, Peter Clemenza's wife
- Simonetta Stefanelli as Apollonia Vitelli-Corleone: Michael's Sicilian wife
- Angelo Infanti as Fabrizio, Michael's Sicilian bodyguard
- Franco Citti as Calò, Michael's other Sicilian bodyguard
- Corrado Gaipa as Don Tommasino: a Palermo crime boss and Michael's guardian in Sicily
- Saro Urzì as Signor Vitelli: Apollonia's father

Uncredited members of the cast include Tom Rosqui as Rocco Lampone, one of Michael's enforcers; Joe Spinell as Willi Cicci, one of Clemenza's enforcers; Gabriele Torrei as Enzo the baker, and Anthony Gounaris as Anthony Corleone. Francis Ford Coppola's daughter Sofia, who was still an infant at the time, appears uncredited as Michael Rizzi in the baptism sequence.

== Production ==
=== Development ===
The film is based on Mario Puzo's The Godfather, which remained on The New York Times Best Seller list for 67 weeks and sold over nine million copies in two years. Published in 1969, it became the best selling published work in history for several years. Burt Lancaster and Danny Thomas both expressed interest adapting the book. Paramount Pictures originally found out about Puzo's novel in 1967 when a literary scout for the company contacted then Paramount Vice President of Production Peter Bart about Puzo's unfinished sixty-page manuscript titled Mafia. Bart believed the work was "much beyond a Mafia story" and offered Puzo a $12,500 option for the work, with an option for $80,000 if the finished work were to be made into a film. Despite Puzo's agent telling him to turn down the offer, Puzo was desperate for money and accepted the deal. Paramount's Robert Evans relates that, when they met in early 1968, he offered Puzo the deal after the author confided in him that he urgently needed $10,000 to pay off gambling debts.

In March 1967, Paramount announced that it backed Puzo's upcoming work in the hopes of making a film. In 1969, Paramount confirmed their intentions to make a film out of the novel for the price of $80,000, (Note: Sources disagree on the date where Paramount confirmed their intentions to make Mario Puzo's novel The Godfather into a feature-length film. Harlan Lebo's work states that the announcement came in January 1969, while Jenny Jones' book puts the date of the announcement three months after the novel's publication, in June 1969.) with aims to have the film released on Christmas Day in 1971. On March 23, 1970, Albert S. Ruddy was officially announced as the film's producer, in part because studio executives were impressed with his interview and because he was known for bringing his films in under budget.

=== Direction ===
Francis Ford Coppola (pictured in 1973) was selected as director. Paramount wanted the picture to be directed by an Italian American to make the film "ethnic to the core".

Evans wanted the picture to be directed by an Italian American to make the film "ethnic to the core". Paramount's latest gangster film, The Brotherhood, had done very poorly at the box office; Evans believed that the reason for its failure was its almost complete lack of cast members or creative personnel of Italian descent (the director Martin Ritt and star Kirk Douglas were not Italian). Sergio Leone was Paramount's first choice to direct the film. Leone turned down the option, to work on his own gangster film Once Upon a Time in America. Peter Bogdanovich was then approached but he also declined the offer because he was not interested in the mafia. In addition, Peter Yates, Richard Brooks, Arthur Penn, Franklin J. Schaffner, Costa-Gavras, and Otto Preminger were all offered the position and declined. Evans' chief assistant Peter Bart suggested Francis Ford Coppola, as a director of Italian ancestry who would work for a low sum and budget after the poor performance of his latest film The Rain People. Coppola initially turned down the job because he found Puzo's novel sleazy and sensationalist, describing it as "pretty cheap stuff". At the time Coppola's studio, American Zoetrope, owed over $400,000 to Warner Bros. for budget overruns with the film THX 1138 and when coupled with his poor financial standing, along with advice from friends and family, Coppola reversed his initial decision and took the job. Coppola was officially announced as director of the film on September 28, 1970. Coppola agreed to receive $125,000 and six percent of the gross rentals. Coppola later found a deeper theme for the material and decided that the film should not be about organized crime but a family chronicle, a metaphor for capitalism in America.

==== Coppola and Paramount ====
Before The Godfather was in production, Paramount had been going through an unsuccessful period. In addition to the failure of The Brotherhood, other recent films that were produced or co-produced by Paramount had greatly exceeded their budgets: Darling Lili, Paint Your Wagon, and Waterloo. The budget for the film was originally $2.5 million but as the book grew in popularity Coppola argued for and ultimately received a larger budget. Paramount executives wanted the movie to be set in contemporary Kansas City and shot in the studio backlot to cut down on costs. Coppola objected and wanted to set the movie in the same time period as the novel, the 1940s and 1950s; Coppola's reasons included Michael Corleone's spell in the wartime Marine Corps, the emergence of corporate America, and America in the years after World War II. The novel was becoming increasingly successful, and so Coppola's wishes were eventually granted. The studio heads subsequently let Coppola film on location in New York City and Sicily.

Gulf+Western executive Charles Bluhdorn was frustrated with Coppola over the number of screen tests he had performed without finding a person to play the various roles. Production quickly fell behind because of Coppola's indecisiveness and conflicts with Paramount, which led to costs being around $40,000 per day. With costs rising, Paramount had the Vice President, Jack Ballard, keep a close eye on production expenses. While filming, Coppola stated that he felt he could be fired at any point, as he knew Paramount executives were not happy with many of the decisions he had made. Coppola was aware that Evans had asked Elia Kazan to take over directing the film because he feared that Coppola was too inexperienced to cope with the increased size of the production. Coppola was also convinced that the film editor, Aram Avakian, and the assistant director, Steve Kestner, were conspiring to get him fired. Avakian complained to Evans that he could not edit the scenes correctly because Coppola was not shooting enough footage. Evans was satisfied with the footage being sent to the West Coast—in which there was also the scene of Michael's double murder in the Bronx restaurant—and authorized Coppola to fire them both. Coppola later explained, "Like the godfather, I fired people as a preemptory strike. The people who were angling the most to have me fired, I had fired." Brando threatened to quit if Coppola was fired.

Paramount wanted The Godfather to appeal to a wide audience and threatened Coppola with a "violence coach" to make the film more exciting. Coppola did add a few more violent scenes to keep the studio happy: the scene in which Connie smashes crockery after finding out Carlo has been cheating was added for this reason.

=== Writing ===
On April 14, 1970, it was revealed that Puzo was hired by Paramount for $100,000, along with a percentage of the film's profits, to work on the screenplay for the film. Working from the book, Coppola wanted to have the themes of culture, character, power, and family at the forefront of the film, whereas Puzo wanted to retain aspects from his novel and his initial draft of 150 pages was finished on August 10, 1970. After Coppola was hired as director, both Puzo and Coppola worked on the screenplay, but separately. Puzo worked on his draft in Los Angeles, while Coppola wrote his version in San Francisco. Coppola created a book where he tore pages out of Puzo's book and pasted them into his book. There, he made notes about each of the book's fifty scenes, which related to major themes prevalent in the scene, whether the scene should be included in the film, along with ideas and concepts that could be used when filming to make the film true to Italian culture. The two remained in contact while they wrote their respective screenplays and made decisions on what to include and what to remove for the final version. A second draft was completed on March 1, 1971, and was 173 pages long. The final screenplay was finished on March 29, 1971, and wound up being 163 pages long, 40 pages over what Paramount had asked for. When filming, Coppola referred to the notebook he had created over the final draft of the screenplay. Screenwriter Robert Towne was asked to do some uncredited work on the script as a script doctor, particularly on the dialogue in the Pacino-Brando garden scene. Despite finishing the third draft, some scenes in the film were still not written yet and were written during production.

The Italian-American Civil Rights League, led by mobster Joseph Colombo, maintained that the film emphasized stereotypes about Italian-Americans, and wanted all uses of the words "mafia" and "Cosa Nostra" to be removed from the script. The league also requested that all the money earned from the premiere be donated to the league's fund to build a new hospital. Coppola claimed that Puzo's screenplay only contained two instances of the word "mafia" being used, while "Cosa Nostra" was not used at all. They were removed and replaced with other terms, without compromising the story. The league eventually gave its support for the script. Earlier, the windows of producer Albert S. Ruddy's car had been shot out with a note left on the dashboard which essentially said, "shut down the movie—or else." However, it was revealed in August 1971 that Ruddy personally met with Colombo family head Joseph Colombo, Colombo's son Anthony, and about 1,500 delegates of Colombo's Italian-American Civil Rights League when he was developing the film, with the first meeting being held on February 25, 1971. Ruddy would also hold numerous meetings with Anthony Colombo. These meetings led to Ruddy agreeing to base the film on individuals and assuring that it would not defame or stereotype Italians. It was even reported that Anthony Colombo eventually made Ruddy an honorary captain of the League.

=== Casting ===
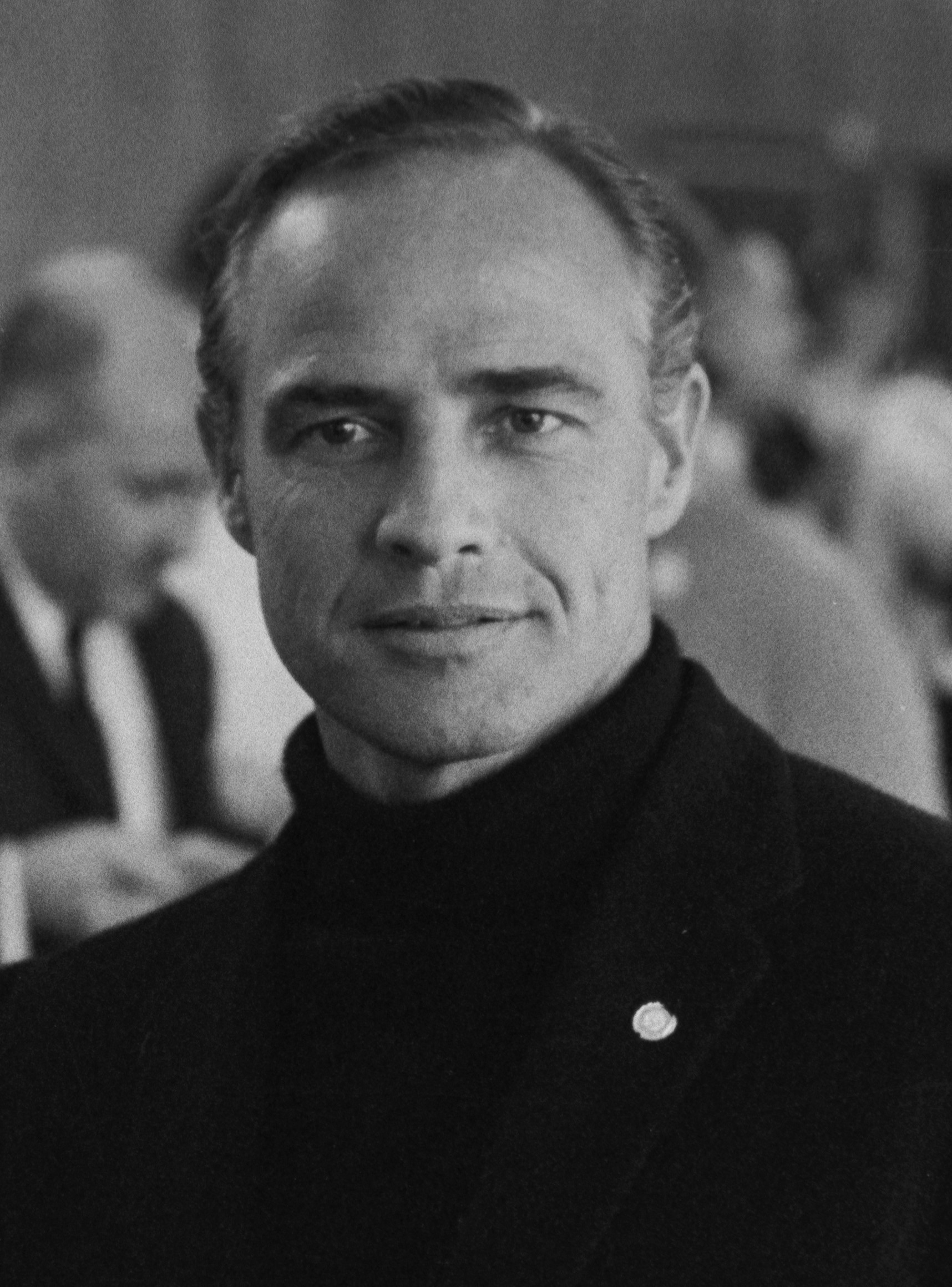
Marlon Brando was chosen to portray Vito Corleone.

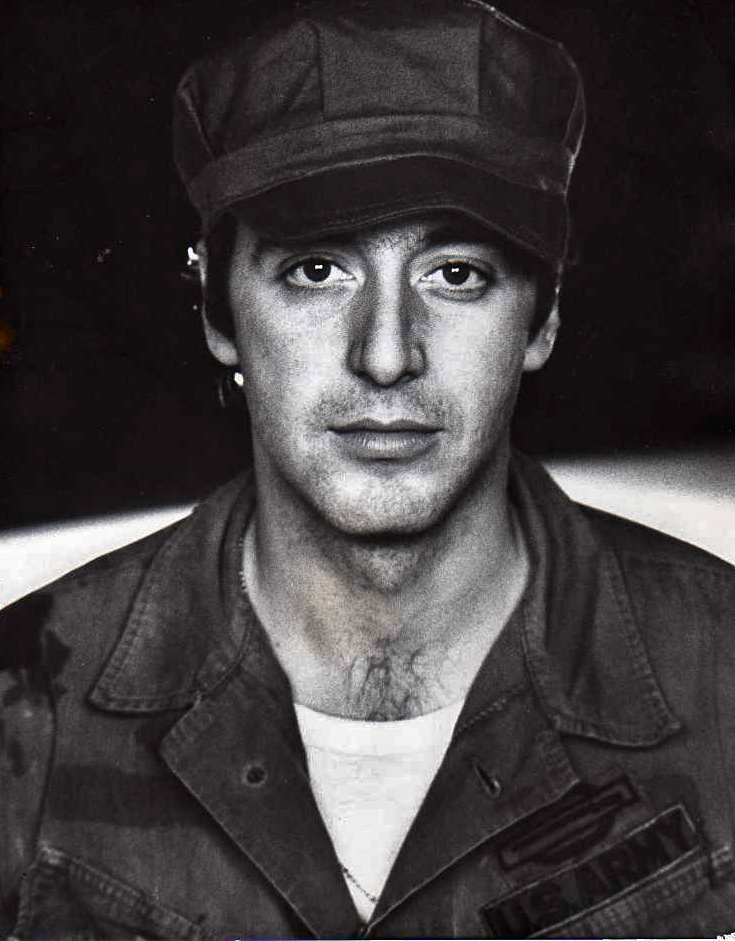
Al Pacino was chosen to portray Michael Corleone.

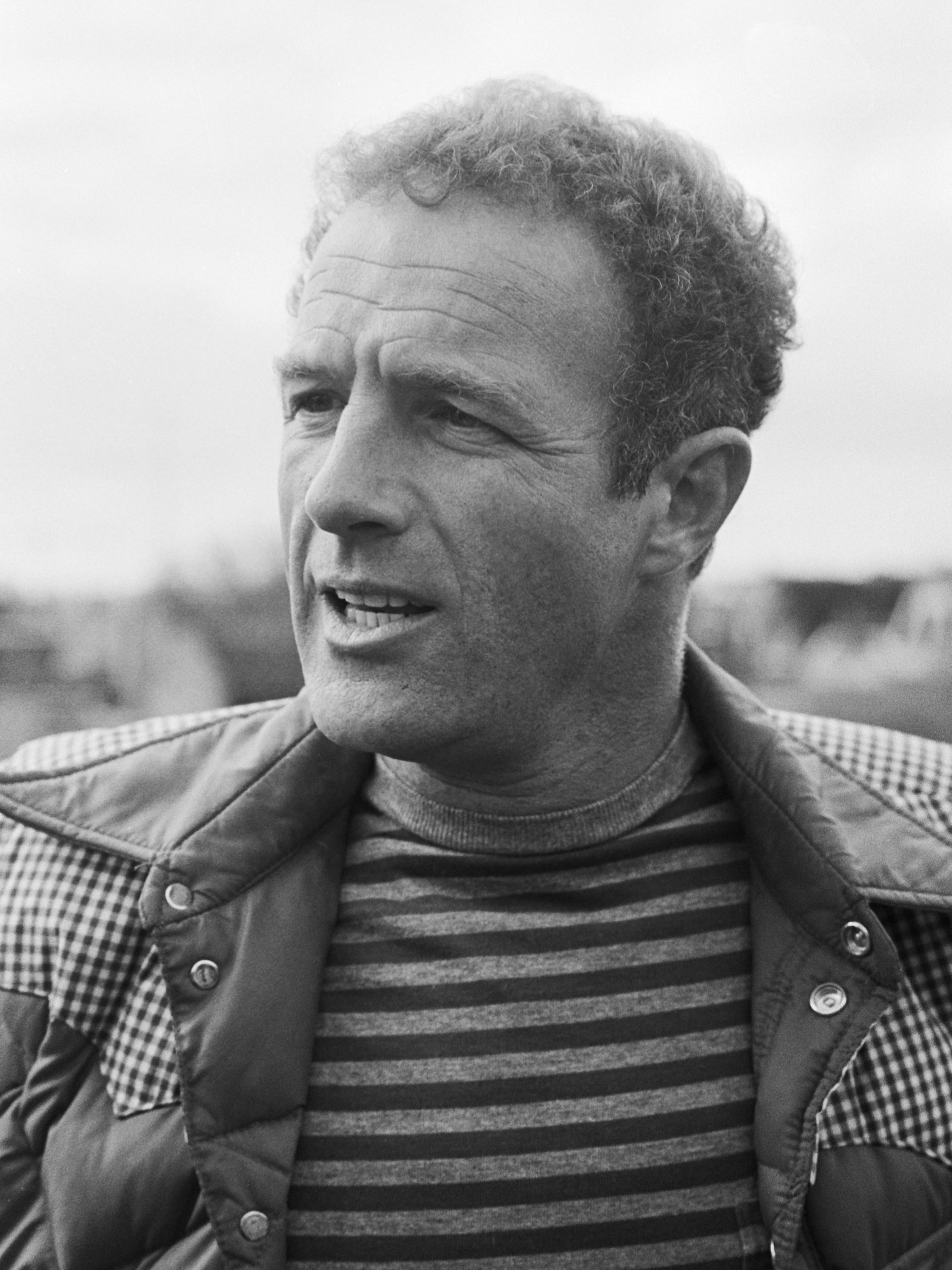
James Caan portrayed Sonny Corleone.

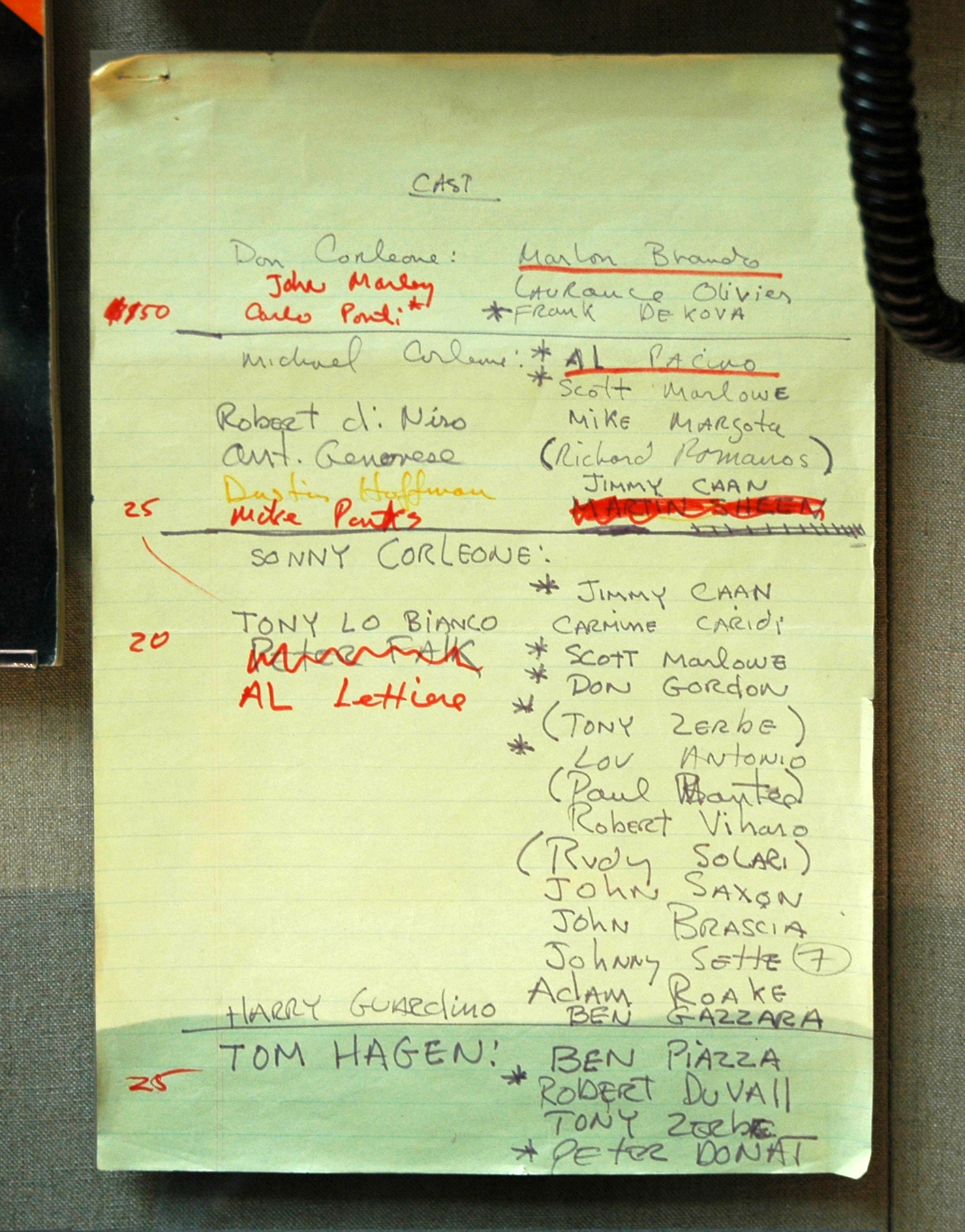
Francis Ford Coppola's handwritten casting notes, showing Brando as a favorite for the role of Don Vito Corleone

Puzo was first to show interest in having Marlon Brando portray Don Vito Corleone by sending a letter to Brando in which he stated Brando was the "only actor who can play the Godfather". Despite Puzo's wishes, the executives at Paramount were against having Brando, partly because of the poor performance of his recent films and also his short temper. Brando was hesitant about getting back into acting, but his secretary Alice Marchak persuaded him to audition. Coppola favored Brando or Laurence Olivier for the role, and Olivier's agent refused the role claiming Olivier was sick; however, Olivier went on to star in Sleuth later that year. Evans pushed for either Carlo Ponti or Ernest Borgnine to receive the part. Bluhdorn proposed Charles Bronson for the role. Others considered were George C. Scott, Richard Conte (who was ultimately cast as Don Barzini), Raf Vallone, Anthony Quinn and Orson Welles. Welles met with Puzo and tried to convince him that he was right for the role.

After months of debate between Coppola and Paramount over Brando, the two finalists for the role were Borgnine and Brando; Paramount president Stanley Jaffe required Brando to perform a screen test. Coppola did not want to offend Brando and stated that he needed to test equipment in order to set up the screen test at Brando's California residence. For make-up, Brando stuck cotton balls in his cheeks, put shoe polish in his hair to darken it, and rolled his collar. Coppola placed Brando's audition tape in the middle of the videos of the audition tapes as the Paramount executives watched them. The executives were impressed with Brando's efforts and allowed Coppola to cast Brando for the role if Brando accepted a lower salary and put up a bond to ensure he would not cause any delays in production. Brando earned $1.6 million from a net participation deal.

From the start of production, Coppola wanted Robert Duvall to play the part of Tom Hagen. After screen testing several other actors, Coppola eventually got his wish and Duvall was awarded the part. Al Martino, a then-famed singer in nightclubs, was notified of the character Johnny Fontane by a friend who read the novel and felt Martino represented the character of Johnny Fontane. Martino then contacted producer Albert S. Ruddy, who gave him the part. Martino was stripped of the part after Coppola became director and then awarded the role to singer Vic Damone. According to Martino, after being stripped of the role, he went to Russell Bufalino, his godfather and a crime boss, who then arranged for news articles to be published that claimed Coppola was unaware of Ruddy's giving Martino the part. Damone eventually dropped the role because he did not want to provoke the mob, in addition to the salary being too low. Ultimately, although Frank Sinatra threatened to bar him from Las Vegas if he took the role, the part of Johnny Fontane was given to Martino.

Coppola cast Diane Keaton for the role of Kay Adams owing to her reputation for being eccentric. Before auditioning, Keaton never read the book, but she decided to read it after she was cast. John Cazale was given the part of Fredo Corleone after Coppola saw him perform in an Off-Broadway production. Gianni Russo was given the role of Carlo Rizzi after he was asked to perform a screen test in which he acted out the fight between Rizzi and Connie.

Nearing the start of filming on March 29, Michael Corleone had yet to be cast. Paramount executives wanted a popular actor, either Warren Beatty, Alain Delon or Robert Redford. In a 2000 interview, Robert Evans recalls this preference when asked, "Was Warren Beatty your first choice for Michael?" He answers: "No, I wanted Alain Delon. He was the type, but he couldn't speak English well. Maybe I did want Warren. I may have thought of Jack [Nicholson] too for it. Jack tells me I did, but I don't remember it. Dustin [Hoffman] desperately wanted to do it." Informed by Evans of the possibility of obtaining the role of Michael Corleone, Delon was already studying the script based on the novel The Godfather and had begun to consider the role with confidence. According to Ali MacGraw, then Evans's wife, he even invited Alain Delon to their estate after mentioning the role to him several times : "Alain [Delon] came to stay at our house when the casting was incomplete. In his back pocket, he always carried the paperback of Le Parrain, which is The Godfather in French. I think he wanted very much to be in it." However, Delon's smooth, polished image didn't fit the intense, brooding character Coppola wanted, and he explains this disagreement over the casting choice by stating: "I realized at one point, Bob Evans wanted a guy that sort of looked like him, and I wanted a guy that sort of looked like me." Delon eventually refused the role and he sets the proposal aside: "I had to learn to speak English with the Italian accent. That did not please me". Subsequently, Evans turned to Ryan O'Neal for the role, owing in part to his recent success in Love Story. Pacino was Coppola's favorite for the role as he could picture him roaming the Sicilian countryside, and wanted an unknown actor who looked like an Italian-American. Paramount executives found Pacino to be too short to play Michael. Many actors also auditioned, including Dustin Hoffman, Martin Sheen, Dean Stockwell, and James Caan. Keaton read with both Caan and Sheen. Burt Reynolds was offered the role of Michael, but Brando threatened to quit if Reynolds was hired. Reynolds declined the role. Jack Nicholson was also offered the role, but declined it as he felt that an Italian-American actor should play the role. Caan was well received by the Paramount executives and was given the part of Michael initially, while the role of Sonny Corleone was awarded to Carmine Caridi. Coppola urged producers Al Ruddy and Evans to see Pacino in The Panic in Needle Park. After watching it, they gave Pacino the part, allowing him to have the role of Michael as long as Caan played Sonny. Evans preferred Caan over Caridi because Caan was seven inches shorter than Caridi, which was much closer to Pacino's height. However, Pacino himself couldn't envision himself in the role because he saw Michael Corleone as someone more glamorous, more self-contained — someone more like Alain Delon. He struggled in early screen tests, often forgetting lines and improvising dialogue. Despite this, Pacino took on the role. Despite agreeing to play Michael Corleone, Pacino was contracted to star in MGM's The Gang That Couldn't Shoot Straight, but the two studios agreed on a settlement, and Pacino was signed by Paramount three weeks before shooting began.

Robert De Niro originally was given the part of Paulie Gatto. A spot in The Gang That Couldn't Shoot Straight opened up after Al Pacino quit the project in favor of The Godfather, which led De Niro to audition for the role and leave The Godfather after receiving the part. De Niro was also cast for the role of Sonny Corleone. After De Niro quit, Johnny Martino was given the role of Gatto. Coppola gave several roles in the film to family members. He gave his sister, Talia Shire, the role of Connie Corleone. His daughter Sofia, then an infant, appeared as Michael Francis Rizzi, Connie's and Carlo's newborn son. Carmine Coppola, his father, appeared in the film as an extra playing a piano during a scene. Coppola's wife, mother, and two sons all appeared as extras in the picture. Several smaller roles, like Luca Brasi, were cast after the filming had started. Ruddy's casting choices would earn him more approval from the Italian-American Civil Rights League, with Anthony Colombo reported to have made Ruddy a league captain after the meeting where the film's bit players and extras were chosen.

=== Filming ===
The Don Barzini assassination scene was filmed on the steps of the New York Supreme Court building on Foley Square in Manhattan.

Before the filming began, the cast received a two-week period for rehearsal, which included a dinner where each actor and actress had to assume their character for its duration. Principal photography was done between March 29 and August 6, 1971. Filming was scheduled to begin on March 29, with the scene between Michael Corleone and Kay Adams as they leave Best & Co. in New York City after shopping for Christmas gifts. The weather on March 23 predicted snow flurries, which caused Ruddy to move the filming date forward; snow did not materialize, and a snow machine was used. Principal filming in New York continued until July 2. Coppola asked for a three-week break before heading overseas to film in Sicily. Following the crew's departure for Sicily, Paramount announced that the release date would be moved to early 1972.

Cinematographer Gordon Willis initially turned down the opportunity to film The Godfather because the production seemed "chaotic" to him. After Willis later accepted the offer, he and Coppola agreed to not use any modern filming devices, helicopters, or zoom lenses. Willis and Coppola chose to use a "tableau format" of filming to make it seem like a painting. He made use of shadows and low light levels throughout the film to show psychological developments. Willis and Coppola agreed to interplay light and dark scenes throughout the film. Willis underexposed the film to create a "yellow tone". The scenes in Sicily were shot to display the countryside and "display a more romantic land," giving these scenes a "softer, more romantic" feel than the New York scenes. Simonetta Stefanelli, who was 16 at the time of filming, revealed that when filming the wedding night scene in Sicily, her gown strap slipped revealing her breasts which Coppola insisted on keeping in the scene.

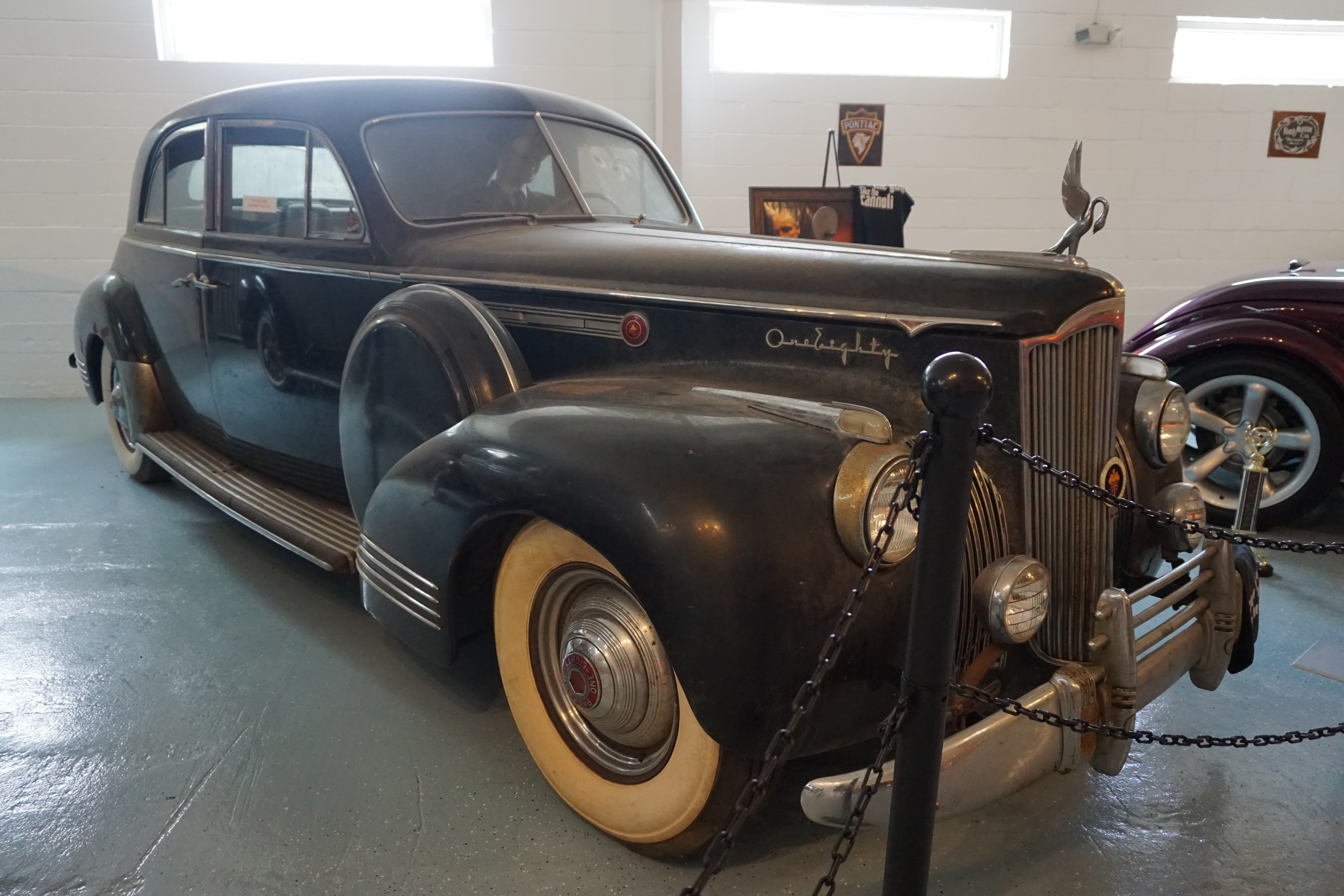
1941 Packard Super Eight featured in The Godfather

One scene in the film involved an actual severed horse's head. The filming location for this scene is contested, as some sources indicate it was filmed at the Beverly Estate, while others indicate it was filmed at Sands Point Preserve on Long Island. Coppola received some criticism for the scene, although the head was obtained from a dog-food company from a horse that was to be killed regardless of the film. On June 22, the scene where Sonny is killed was shot on a runway at Mitchel Field in Uniondale, where three tollbooths were built, along with guard rails, and billboards to set the scene. Sonny's car was a 1941 Lincoln Continental with holes drilled in it to resemble bullet holes. The scene took three days to film and cost over $100,000.

Coppola's request to film on location was observed; approximately 90 percent was shot in New York City and its surrounding suburbs, using over 120 distinct locations. Several scenes were filmed at Filmways in East Harlem. The remaining portions were filmed in California, or in Sicily. The scenes set in Las Vegas were not shot on location because there were insufficient funds. Savoca and Forza d'Agrò were the Sicilian towns featured in the film. The opening wedding scene was shot in a Staten Island neighborhood using almost 750 locals as extras. The house used as the Corleone household and the wedding location was at 110 Longfellow Avenue in the Todt Hill neighborhood of Staten Island. The wall around the Corleone compound was made from styrofoam. Scenes set in and around the Corleone olive oil business were filmed on Mott Street.

After filming had ended on August 7, post-production efforts were focused on trimming the film to a manageable length. In addition, producers and directors were still including and removing different scenes from the end product, along with trimming certain sequences. In September, the first rough cut of the film was viewed. Many of the scenes removed from the film were centered around Sonny, which did not advance the plot. By November, Coppola and Ruddy finished the semi-final cut. Debates over personnel involved with the final editing remained even 25 years after the release of the film. The film was shown to Paramount staff and exhibitors in late December 1971 and January 1972.

== Music ==
Coppola hired Italian composer Nino Rota to create the underscore for the film, including "Love Theme from The Godfather". For the score, Rota was to relate to the situations and characters in the film. Rota synthesized new music for the film and took some parts from his 1958 Fortunella film score, to create an Italian feel and evoke the tragedy within the film. Paramount executive Evans found the score to be too "highbrow" and did not want to use it; however, it was used after Coppola managed to get Evans to agree. Coppola believed that Rota's musical piece gave the film even more of an Italian feel. Coppola's father, Carmine, created some additional music for the film, particularly the music played by the band during the opening wedding scene.

Incidental music includes "C'è la luna mezzo mare", Cherubino's aria, "Non so più cosa son", from Mozart's Le Nozze di Figaro and "Brindisi", from Verdi's La traviata. There was a soundtrack released for the film in 1972 in vinyl form by Paramount Records, on CD in 1991 by Geffen Records, and digitally by Geffen on August 18, 2005. The album contains over 31 minutes of music that was used in the film, most of which was composed by Rota, along with a song from Coppola and one by Johnny Farrow and Marty Symes. AllMusic gave the album five out of five, with editor Zach Curd saying it is a "dark, looming, and elegant soundtrack". An editor for Filmtracks believed that Rota was successful in relating the music to the film's core aspects. Bach's Prelude and Fugue in D major, BWV 532 and Passacaglia and Fugue in C minor, BWV 582 are played during the baptism scene.

== Release ==
=== Theatrical ===
The world premiere for The Godfather took place at Loews's State Theatre in New York City on Tuesday, March 14, 1972, almost three months after the planned release date of Christmas Day in 1971, with profits from the premiere donated to The Boys Club of New York. Before the film premiered, the film had already made $15 million from advance rentals from over 400 nationwide highlighted theaters as part of the marketing promotion plan for the film. The following day, the film opened in five theaters in New York (Loew's State I and II, Orpheum, Cine and Tower East). Next was the Imperial Theatre in Toronto on March 17 and then Los Angeles at two theaters on March 22. The Godfather was released on March 24, 1972, throughout the rest of the United States reaching 316 theaters five days later.

=== Home media ===
The television rights for the film were sold for a record $10 million to NBC for one showing over two nights. The theatrical version of The Godfather debuted on American network television on NBC with only minor edits. The first half of the film aired on Saturday, November 16, 1974, and the second half two days later. The television airings attracted a large audience with an average Nielsen rating of 38.2 and audience share of 59% making it the eighth most-watched film on television, with the broadcast of the second half getting the third-best rating for a film on TV behind Airport and Love Story with a rating of 39.4 and 57% share. The broadcast helped generate anticipation for the upcoming sequel. The next year, Coppola created The Godfather Saga expressly for American television in a release that combined The Godfather and The Godfather Part II with unused footage from those two films in a chronological telling that toned down the violent, sexual, and profane material for its NBC debut on November 18, 1977. In 1981, Paramount released the Godfather Epic boxed set, which also told the story of the first two films in chronological order, again with additional scenes, but not redacted for broadcast sensibilities. The Godfather Trilogy was released in 1992, in which the films are fundamentally in chronological order.

The Godfather Family: A Look Inside was a 73-minute documentary released in 1991. Directed by Jeff Warner, the film featured some behind-the-scenes content from all three films, interviews with the actors, and screen tests. The Godfather DVD Collection was released on October 9, 2001, in a package that contained all three films—each with a commentary track by Coppola—and a bonus disc containing The Godfather Family: A Look Inside. The DVD also held a Corleone family tree, a "Godfather" timeline, and footage of the Academy Award acceptance speeches.

==== The Godfather: The Coppola Restoration ====
During the film's original theatrical release, the original negatives were worn down due to the reel being printed so much to meet demand. In addition, the duplicate negative was lost in Paramount archives. In 2006 Coppola contacted Steven Spielberg—whose studio DreamWorks had recently been bought out by Paramount—about restoring The Godfather. Robert A. Harris was hired to oversee the restoration of The Godfather and its two sequels, with the film's cinematographer Willis participating in the restoration. Work began in November 2006 by repairing the negatives so they could go through a digital scanner to produce high-resolution 4K files. If a negative was damaged and discolored, work was done digitally to restore it to its original look. After a year and a half of working on the restoration, the project was complete. Paramount called the finished product The Godfather: The Coppola Restoration and released it to the public on September 23, 2008, on both DVD and Blu-ray Disc. Dave Kehr of The New York Times believed the restoration brought back the "golden glow of their original theatrical screenings". As a whole, the restoration of the film was well received by critics and Coppola. The Godfather: The Coppola Restoration contains several new special features that play in high definition, (including additional scenes, behind the scenes footage, etc.).

Paramount Pictures restored and remastered The Godfather, The Godfather Part II, and The Godfather Coda: The Death of Michael Corleone (a re-edited cut of the third film) for a limited theatrical run and home media release on Blu-ray and 4K Blu-ray to celebrate the 50th anniversary of the premiere of The Godfather. The disc editions were released on March 22, 2022.

== Reception ==
=== Box office ===
The Godfather was a blockbuster, breaking many box office records to become the highest-grossing film of 1972. The film's opening day gross from five theaters was $57,829 with ticket prices increased from $3 to $3.50. Prices in New York increased further at the weekend to $4, and the number of showings increased from four times a day to seven times a day. The film grossed $61,615 in Toronto for the weekend and $240,780 in New York, for an opening weekend gross of $302,395. The film grossed $454,000 for the week in New York and $115,000 in Toronto for a first week gross of $568,800, which made it number one at the U.S. box office for the week. In its first five days of national release, it grossed $6.8 million, taking its gross up to $7,397,164. A week later its gross had reached $17,291,705 with the one week gross of around $10 million being an industry record. It grossed another $8.7 million by April 9 to take its gross to $26,000,815. After 18 weeks at number one in the United States, the film had grossed $101 million, the fastest film to reach that milestone. Some news articles at the time proclaimed it was the first film to gross $100 million in North America, but such accounts are erroneous; this record belongs to The Sound of Music, released in 1965. It remained at number one in the US for another five weeks to bring its total to 23 consecutive weeks at number one before being unseated by Butterflies Are Free for one week before becoming number one for another three weeks.

The film eventually earned $81.5 million in theatrical rentals in the US and Canada during its initial release, increasing its earnings to $85.7 million through a reissue in 1973, and including a limited re-release in 1997, it ultimately earned an equivalent exhibition gross of $135 million, with a production cost of $6.5 million. It displaced Gone with the Wind to claim the record as the top rentals earner, a position it would retain until the release of Jaws in 1975. The film repeated its native success overseas, earning in total an unprecedented $142 million in worldwide theatrical rentals, to become the highest net earner. Profits were so high for The Godfather that earnings for Gulf & Western Industries, Inc., which owned Paramount, jumped from 77 cents per share to $3.30 a share for the year, according to a Los Angeles Times article, dated December 13, 1972. Re-released eight more times since 1997, it has grossed between $250 million and $291 million in worldwide box office receipts, and adjusted for ticket price inflation in North America, ranks among the top 25 highest-grossing films.

=== Critical response ===
The Godfather has received widespread critical acclaim and is seen as one of the greatest and most influential films of all time, particularly of the gangster genre. On review aggregator Rotten Tomatoes, the film holds an approval rating of 97% based on 155 reviews, with an average rating of 9.8/10. The website's critics consensus reads, "One of Hollywood's greatest critical and commercial successes, The Godfather gets everything right; not only did the movie transcend expectations, but it established new benchmarks for American cinema." Metacritic, which uses a weighted average, has assigned the film a score of 100 out of 100 based on 16 critic reviews, indicating "universal acclaim".

The Village Voice's Andrew Sarris believed Marlon Brando portrayed Vito Corleone well, and that his character dominated each scene he appeared in, but felt Puzo and Coppola had the character of Michael Corleone too focused on revenge. In addition, Sarris stated that Richard Castellano, Robert Duvall, and James Caan were good in their respective roles. Pauline Kael of The New Yorker wrote that:

If ever there was a great example of how the best popular movies come out of a merger of commerce and art, The Godfather is it...[Coppola] has stayed very close to the book's greased-lightning sensationalism and yet has made a movie with the spaciousness and strength that popular novels such as Dickens' used to have.

She concluded that "The Godfather is popular melodrama, but it expresses a new tragic realism."

Roger Ebert of the Chicago Sun Times named The Godfather the best film of 1972. He praised the casting by Coppola and Ruddy: "As the Irish cop, for example, they simply slide in Sterling Hayden and let the character go about his business." He wrote that:

Coppola has found a style and a visual look for all this material so "The Godfather" becomes something of a rarity: a really good movie squeezed from a bestseller. The decision to shoot everything in period decor (the middle and late 1940s) was crucial; if they'd tried to save money as they originally planned, by bringing everything up-to-date, the movie simply wouldn't have worked. But it's uncannily successful as a period piece, filled with sleek, bulging limousines and postwar fedoras. Coppola and his cinematographer, Gordon Willis, also do some interesting things with the color photography. The earlier scenes have a reddish-brown tint, slightly overexposed and feeling like nothing so much as a 1946 newspaper rotogravure supplement.

The Chicago Tribune's Gene Siskel gave the film four out of four, commenting that it was "very good".

Desson Howe of The Washington Post called the film a "jewel" and wrote that Coppola deserves most of the credit for the film. Writing for The New York Times, Vincent Canby felt that Coppola had created one of the "most brutal and moving chronicles of American life" and went on to say that it "transcends its immediate milieu and genre". Director Stanley Kubrick thought the film had the best cast ever and could be the best movie ever made. Director Steven Spielberg listed it among his favorite films. Stanley Kauffmann of The New Republic wrote negatively of the film in a contemporary review, claiming that Pacino "rattles around in a part too demanding for him", while also criticizing Brando's make-up and Rota's score.

Previous Mafia films had looked at the gangs from the perspective of an outraged outsider. In contrast, The Godfather presents the gangster's perspective of the Mafia as a response to corrupt society. Although the Corleone family is presented as immensely rich and powerful, no scenes depict prostitution, gambling, loan sharking, or other forms of racketeering. George De Stefano argues that the setting of a criminal counterculture allows for unapologetic gender stereotyping (such as when Vito tells a weepy Johnny Fontane to "act like a man") and is an important part of the film's appeal.

Remarking on the fortieth anniversary of the film's release, film critic John Podhoretz praised The Godfather as "arguably the great American work of popular art" and "the summa of all great moviemaking before it". Two years before, Roger Ebert had written in his journal that it "comes closest to being a film everyone agrees ... is unquestionably great". Ebert added it to his canon of great movies, writing:

... a strange thing happened as I watched the restored version: Familiar as I am with Robert Duvall, when he first appeared on the screen I found myself thinking, "There's Tom Hagen." Coppola went to Italy to find Nino Rota, composer of many Fellini films, to score the picture. Hearing the sadness and nostalgia of the movie's main theme, I realized what the music was telling us: Things would have turned out better if only they had listened to the Godfather.

== Accolades ==
The Godfather was nominated for seven awards at the 30th Golden Globe Awards: Best Picture – Drama, Al Pacino and Marlon Brando for Best Actor – Drama, James Caan for Best Supporting Actor, Best Score, Best Director, and Best Screenplay, winning for: Best Screenplay, Best Director, Best Actor – Drama (Brando), Best Original Score, and Best Picture – Drama.

Rota's score was also nominated for Grammy Award for Best Original Score for a Motion Picture or TV Special at the 15th Grammy Awards. Rota was announced the winner of the category on March 3 at the Grammys' ceremony in Nashville, Tennessee.

When the nominations for the 45th Academy Awards were revealed on February 12, 1973, The Godfather was nominated for eleven awards. The nominations were for: Best Picture, Best Costume Design, Marlon Brando for Best Actor, Mario Puzo and Francis Ford Coppola for Best Adapted Screenplay, Pacino, Caan, and Robert Duvall for Best Supporting Actor, Best Film Editing, Nino Rota for Best Original Score, Coppola for Best Director, and Best Sound. Upon further review of Rota's love theme from The Godfather, the academy found that Rota had used a similar score in Eduardo De Filippo's 1958 comedy Fortunella. This led to re-balloting, where members of the music branch chose from six films: The Godfather and the five films that had been on the shortlist for best original dramatic score but did not get nominated. John Addison's score for Sleuth won this new vote, and thus replaced Rota's score on the official list of nominees. Going into the awards ceremony, The Godfather was seen as the favorite to take home the most awards. From the nominations that The Godfather had remaining, it only won three of the Academy Awards: Best Actor for Brando, Best Adapted Screenplay, and Best Picture.

Brando, who did not attend the Golden Globes ceremony two months earlier, boycotted the Academy Awards ceremony and declined the Oscar, becoming the second actor to decline a Best Actor award after George C. Scott in 1971. Brando sent American Indian Rights activist Sacheen Littlefeather in his place, to announce at the awards podium Brando's reasons for declining the award, which were based on his objection to the depiction of American Indians by Hollywood and television. Pacino also did not attend the ceremony; he was allegedly insulted at being nominated for the Academy Award for Best Supporting Actor, when he had more screen time than his co-star and Best Actor-winner Brando, and thus should have received the nomination for Best Actor. Pacino denies this, saying in his memoir, Sonny Boy, that he was "scared" of his sudden fame and never heard the rumor until much later in his life.

The Godfather had five nominations for awards at the 26th British Academy Film Awards. The nominees were: Pacino for Most Promising Newcomer, Rota for the Anthony Asquith Award for Film Music, Duvall for Best Supporting Actor, and Brando for Best Actor, the film's costume designer Anna Hill Johnstone for Best Costume Design. The only nomination to win was that of Rota.

Award	Category	Nominee	Result
45th Academy Awards	Best Picture	Albert S. Ruddy	Won
45th Academy Awards	Best Director	Francis Ford Coppola	Nominated
45th Academy Awards	Best Actor	Marlon Brando (declined award)	Won
45th Academy Awards	Best Supporting Actor	James Caan	Nominated
45th Academy Awards	Best Supporting Actor	Robert Duvall	Nominated
45th Academy Awards	Best Supporting Actor	Al Pacino	Nominated
45th Academy Awards	Best Adapted Screenplay	Mario Puzo and Francis Ford Coppola	Won
45th Academy Awards	Best Costume Design	Anna Hill Johnstone	Nominated
45th Academy Awards	Best Film Editing	William Reynolds and Peter Zinner	Nominated
45th Academy Awards	Best Sound	Bud Grenzbach, Richard Portman and Christopher Newman	Nominated
45th Academy Awards	Best Original Dramatic Score	Nino Rota	Revoked
26th British Academy Film Awards	Best Actor	Marlon Brando (Also for The Nightcomers)	Nominated
26th British Academy Film Awards	Best Supporting Actor	Robert Duvall	Nominated
26th British Academy Film Awards	Most Promising Newcomer to Leading Film Roles	Al Pacino	Nominated
26th British Academy Film Awards	Best Film Music	Nino Rota	Won
26th British Academy Film Awards	Best Costume Design	Anna Hill Johnstone	Nominated
25th Directors Guild of America Awards	Outstanding Directorial Achievement in Motion Pictures	Francis Ford Coppola	Won
30th Golden Globe Awards	Best Motion Picture – Drama		Won
30th Golden Globe Awards	Best Director – Motion Picture	Francis Ford Coppola	Won
30th Golden Globe Awards	Best Motion Picture Actor – Drama	Marlon Brando	Won
30th Golden Globe Awards	Best Motion Picture Actor – Drama	Al Pacino	Nominated
30th Golden Globe Awards	Best Supporting Actor – Motion Picture	James Caan	Nominated
30th Golden Globe Awards	Best Screenplay	Mario Puzo and Francis Ford Coppola	Won
30th Golden Globe Awards	Best Original Score	Nino Rota	Won
15th Grammy Awards	Best Original Score Written for a Motion Picture or TV Special	Nino Rota	Won
25th Writers Guild of America Awards	Best Drama Adapted from Another Medium	Mario Puzo and Francis Ford Coppola	Won

== Recognition ==
=== American Film Institute ===
- 1998 AFI's 100 Years...100 Movies – No. 3
- 2001 AFI's 100 Years...100 Thrills – No. 11
- 2005 AFI's 100 Years...100 Movie Quotes:
  - "I'm going to make him an offer he can't refuse." – No. 2
- 2006 AFI's 100 Years of Film Scores – No. 5
- 2007 AFI's 100 Years...100 Movies (10th Anniversary Edition) – No. 2
- 2008 AFI's 10 Top 10 – No. 1 Gangster Film

=== Others ===
- 1990 Selected for preservation in the United States National Film Registry as being deemed "culturally, historically, or aesthetically significant".
- 1992 The Godfather ranked 6th in Sight & Sound Greatest Films of All Time director's poll.
- 1998 Time Out conducted a poll and The Godfather was voted the best film of all time.
- The Village Voice ranked The Godfather at number 12 in its Top 250 "Best Films of the Century" list in 1999, based on a poll of critics.
- 1999 Entertainment Weekly named it the greatest film ever made.
- 2002 Sight & Sound polled film directors and they voted the film and its sequel as the second best film ever; the critics poll separately voted it fourth.
- 2002 The Godfather was ranked the second best film of all time by Film4, after Star Wars Episode V: The Empire Strikes Back.
- 2002 The film (along with The Godfather Part II) was included on the list of the "Top 100 Essential Films of All Time" by the National Society of Film Critics.
- 2005 Named one of the 100 greatest films of the last 80 years by Time magazine (the selected films were not ranked).
- 2006 The Writers Guild of America, West agreed, voting it the number two in its list of the 101 greatest screenplays, after Casablanca.
- 2008 Voted in at No. 1 on Empire magazine's list of The 500 Greatest Movies of All Time.
- 2008 Voted at No. 50 on the list of "100 Greatest Films" by the prominent French magazine Cahiers du cinéma.
- 2009 The Godfather was ranked at No. 1 on Japanese film magazine kinema Junpo's Top 10 Non-Japanese Films of All Time list.
- 2010 The Guardian ranked the film 15th in its list of 25 greatest arthouse films.
- 2012 The Motion Picture Editors Guild listed The Godfather as the sixth best-edited film of all time based on a survey of its membership.
- 2012 The film ranked at number seven on Sight & Sound directors' top ten poll. On the same list, it was ranked at number twenty-one by critics.
- 2014 The Godfather was voted the greatest film in a Hollywood Reporter poll of 2120 industry members, including every studio, agency, publicity firm, and production house in Hollywood in 2014.
- 2015 Second on the BBC's "100 Greatest American Films", voted by film critics from around the world.
- 2022 Came in twelfth on the British Film Institute's 2022 Sight & Sound critics' poll, while their directors' poll listed it third.

== Cultural influence and legacy ==
Although many films about gangsters preceded The Godfather, Coppola steeped his film in Italian immigrant culture, and his portrayal of mobsters as persons of considerable psychological depth and complexity was unprecedented. Coppola took it further with The Godfather Part II, and the success of those two films, critically, artistically and financially, was a catalyst for the production of numerous other depictions of Italian Americans as mobsters, including films such as Martin Scorsese's Goodfellas and TV series such as David Chase's The Sopranos. A comprehensive study of Italian-American culture in film from 1914 to 2014 was conducted by the Italic Institute of America showing the influence of The Godfather.

Produced in a period of intense national cynicism and self-criticism, the film struck a chord about the dual identities felt by many descendants of immigrants. The Godfather has been cited as an influence in an increase in Hollywood's negative portrayals of immigrant Italians, and was a recruiting tool for organized crime. Don Vito Corleone's line, "I'm gonna make him an offer he can't refuse", was voted the second-most memorable line in cinema history in AFI's 100 Years...100 Movie Quotes by the American Film Institute, in 2014. The concept was not unique to the film. French writer Honoré de Balzac, in his novel Le Père Goriot (1835), wrote that Vautrin told Eugène: "In that case I will make you an offer that no one would decline." An almost identical line was used in the John Wayne Western, Riders of Destiny (1933), where Forrest Taylor states, "I've made Denton an offer he can't refuse." In 2014, the film also was selected as the greatest film by 2,120 industry professionals in a Hollywood survey undertaken by The Hollywood Reporter.

Gangsters reportedly responded enthusiastically to the film. Salvatore "Sammy the Bull" Gravano, the former underboss in the Gambino crime family, said: "I left the movie stunned ... I mean, I floated out of the theater. Maybe it was fiction, but for me, then, that was our life. It was incredible. I remember talking to a multitude of guys, made guys, who felt the same way." According to Anthony Fiato, after seeing the film, Patriarca crime family members Paulie Intiso and Nicky Giso altered their speech patterns to imitate that of Vito Corleone. Intiso was known to swear frequently and use poor grammar, but after seeing the movie, he began to improve his speech and philosophize more. In 2025, The Times reported that recruits to the Sicilian Mafia in Italy are now urged by mafia bosses to watch The Godfather so they can learn the trade and because mafia bosses fear that new recruits "lack a code of honour".

== Representation in other media ==
The film has been referenced and parodied in various kinds of media.

- John Belushi appeared in a Saturday Night Live sketch as Vito Corleone in a therapy session; he said of the Tattaglia Family, "Also, they shot my son Santino 56 times".
- The crime drama television show The Sopranos has many film references. Most notably, Silvio Dante's topless bar is named Bada Bing!, a phrase popularized by James Caan's character Sonny Corleone in The Godfather. Throughout the show, Silvio impersonates Al Pacino's character, Michael Corleone, using quotes from the movie and its sequels.
- In the animated television series The Simpsons, there have been many references to the film. For instance, in the season 3 episode "Lisa's Pony", Lisa wakes up to find a horse in her bed and starts screaming, a reference to Jack Woltz finding his prize racehorse's head in his bed. In the season 4 episode "Mr. Plow", Bart Simpson is pelted with snowballs in mimicry of Sonny's killing.
- The film's baptism sequence was parodied in "Fulgencio", the 13th episode of season 4 of the comedy series Modern Family, with Phil Dunphy standing in for Michael. The sequence also references the horse head scene; Phil's son Luke places the severed head from a stuffed zebra toy in the bed of a boy who had been making fun of him and has a fear of zebras. Phil also references Godfather lines when he tells his wife Claire, "Don't ask me about my business," and mentions an offer he can't refuse.
- The 2006 video game The Godfather is based upon this film and tells the story of Aldo Trapani, whose rise through the ranks of the Corleone family intersects with the plot of the film on numerous occasions. Duvall, Caan, and Brando supplied voiceovers and their likenesses, but Pacino did not. Francis Ford Coppola openly voiced his disapproval of the game.
- In the 2016 animated film Zootopia, the character Mr. Big is a parody of Vito Corleone.
- On April 28, 2022, a 10-episode drama series The Offer premiered on Paramount+, about the production told from the perspective of producer Ruddy.
- The 2023 film Barbie, directed by Greta Gerwig, features a scene in which the characters watch The Godfather, with Ken, portrayed by Kingsley Ben-Adir, praising the film as a collective effort of Francis Ford Coppola and Robert Evans. A clip from The Godfather is also shown, showing Marlon Brando in the opening scene of the film.
- In season 4 episode 27 of the animated show Family Guy, Peter Griffin admits to his family that he did not care for the film, causing debate. When asked to explain himself, Peter replied that the film "insists upon itself". Seth Macfarlane explained on X that the origin of "it insists upon itself" was a criticism his college film history professor had of the film The Sound of Music.

== See also ==
- List of films set in New York City
- List of films set in Las Vegas

== Bibliography ==
- Block, Alex Ben; Wilson, Lucy Autrey (2010). George Lucas's Blockbusting: A Decade-by-Decade Survey of Timeless Movies Including Untold Secrets of Their Financial and Cultural Success. New York, New York: HarperCollins. ISBN 978-0-06-177889-6. Archived from the original on December 18, 2019.
- Browne, Nick (1999). "Fearful A-Symmetries: Violence as History in the Godfather Films". In Browne, Nick (ed.). Francis Ford Coppola's The Godfather Trilogy (PDF). Cambridge University Press. doi:10.1017/CBO9781139172912.002. Archived from the original (PDF) on March 2, 2022.
- Coppola, Francis F (2016). The Godfather Notebook. Regan Arts. ISBN 978-1-68245-074-1.
- Cowie, Peter (1997). The Godfather Book. London, England: Faber and Faber Limited. ISBN 978-0-571-19011-9.
- De Stefano, George (2006). "Chapter 4: Don Corleone Was My Godfather". An Offer We Can't Refuse: The Mafia in the Mind of America. New York: Faber and Faber. pp. 94–135. ISBN 978-0-571-21157-9. OCLC 60420173. Archived from the original on June 27, 2014.
- Gelmis, Joseph (August 23, 1971). "Merciful Heavens, Is This The End of Don Corleone?". New York. 4 (34). ISSN 0028-7369. Archived from the original on September 21, 2014.
- Jones, Jenny M. (2007). The Annotated Godfather: The Complete Screenplay. New York, New York: Black Dog & Leventhal. ISBN 978-1-57912-739-8. Archived from the original on October 25, 2015.
- Lebo, Harlan (1997). The Godfather Legacy: The Untold Story of the Making of the Classic Godfather Trilogy. London, England: Simon & Schuster. ISBN 978-0-684-83647-8. Archived from the original on June 5, 2020.
- Lebo, Harlan (2005). The Godfather Legacy: The Untold Story of the Making of the Classic Godfather Trilogy Featuring Never-Before-Published Production Stills. London, England: Simon & Schuster. ISBN 978-0-7432-8777-7. Archived from the original on November 9, 2015.
- Phillips, Gene D. (2004). Godfather: The Intimate Francis Ford Coppola. Lexington, Kentucky: University Press of Kentucky. ISBN 978-0-8131-4671-3. Archived from the original on June 29, 2020.
- Santopietro, Tom (2012). The Godfather Effect: Changing Hollywood, America, and Me. New York, New York: Thomas Dunne Books. ISBN 978-1-250-00513-7. Archived from the original on June 10, 2014.
- Stanley, Timothy (2014). Citizen Hollywood: How the Collaboration Between LA and DC Revolutionized American Politics. New York, New York: Thomas Dunne Books. ISBN 978-1-250-03249-2. Archived from the original on November 20, 2015.
- Williams, Joe (2012). Hollywood Myths: The Shocking Truths Behind Film's Most Incredible Secrets and Scandals. Minneapolis, Minnesota: MBI Pub. Co. and Voyageur Press. ISBN 978-1-250-03249-2. Archived from the original on October 17, 2015.
- Welsh, James M.; Phillips, Gene D.; Hill, Rodney F. (2010). The Francis Ford Coppola Encyclopedia. Lanham, Maryland: Scarecrow Press. ISBN 978-0-8108-7651-4. Archived from the original on March 28, 2017.
- Von Gunden, Kenneth (1991). Postmodern Auteurs: Coppola, Lucas, De Palma, Spielberg and Scorsese. McFarland & Company. ISBN 978-0-89950-618-0.
