= Carlo Rizzi (The Godfather) =

Fictional character from The Godfather series

- Gianni Russo as Carlo Rizzi
- First appearance: The Godfather
- Last appearance: The Godfather Part II (flashback cameo)
- Created by: Mario Puzo
- Portrayed by: Gianni Russo

In-universe information
- Gender: Male
- Family: Corleone family
- Spouse: Connie Corleone (1945–1955)
- Children: Victor; Michael Francis

Carlo Rizzi is a fictional character in Mario Puzo's 1969 novel The Godfather. In the 1972 film adaptation, he was portrayed by Gianni Russo.

== In the novel and film ==
Described in the novel as "a punk, sore at the world", Rizzi was born in Nevada and moved to New York City following trouble with the law. He befriends Sonny Corleone and in 1941, he meets Sonny's sister Connie at a surprise birthday party for their father, crime boss Vito Corleone. Rizzi and Connie marry in 1945. Vito disapproves of Connie's marriage to a small-time criminal who is not a full-blooded Sicilian (Rizzi's father was Sicilian but his mother was from northern Italy), but consents to the marriage on condition that they have a traditional Sicilian wedding.

Rizzi basks in the glory of marrying into the Corleone crime family. However, Vito instructs consigliere Tom Hagen to forbid Rizzi to have any significant knowledge of the family's inner workings and only to "give him a living". He operates a small sports book under the family's supervision, though he proves inept even at that.

Rizzi hates how his in-laws treat him, and regularly abuses and cheats on Connie to assert his own power over the Corleone family. When Connie complains to her parents, Vito coldly refuses to intervene, presumably to punish her for her poor choice in a husband. In truth, Vito is outraged by Rizzi's behavior, but he feels powerless to act because Italian tradition forbids fathers, even Mafia bosses, from interfering in their children's marriages.

In contrast to his parents, Sonny has no patience for Rizzi's treatment of Connie and he has to be physically restrained by Vito from assaulting Rizzi. Once, when Sonny visits Connie, he finds her with a black eye after a particularly severe beating. Furious, Sonny finds and beats Rizzi in the street, threatening to kill him if he ever hurts Connie again. Humiliated, Rizzi seeks revenge by secretly making a deal with the Corleones' chief rival, Emilio Barzini, to murder Sonny.

Rizzi sets the plan in motion by having his mistress call his house, provoking a pregnant Connie into an argument in which he whips her with his belt. When Connie calls Sonny, he loses his temper and races off to find Rizzi. En route, Sonny is killed by Barzini's men in a hail of gunfire at a causeway toll booth.

After Sonny's death, Vito seems to take a liking to Rizzi, and allows him to run a family-controlled labor union. When Michael becomes operating head of the family after Vito semi-retires, he plans to move the family's business interests to Nevada. Michael treats Rizzi as a trusted lieutenant, promising he will be his "right-hand man" once the move is complete. Michael even agrees to be godfather to Rizzi and Connie’s second child. However, Vito and Michael had determined early on that Rizzi had set Sonny up. In accordance with Vito's adage, "Keep your friends close, but your enemies closer," they bring him deeper within the family fold solely as a ploy to make him complacent. Vito cannot bring himself to make his daughter a widow, and so leaves it to Michael to carry out Rizzi's execution after his death.

Vito dies in 1955, and Michael succeeds him as head of the family. As Rizzi and Connie’s child is baptized, Michael orders the murders of the other heads of the Five Families and Las Vegas casino kingpin Moe Greene. Hours later, Michael confronts Rizzi, saying he knows Rizzi set Sonny up to be murdered. He assures Rizzi that his life will be spared, but that he is being exiled from the family. Rizzi, believing he is safe, confesses that he conspired with Barzini. As he is about to be driven to the airport, Peter Clemenza, Michael's caporegime and Sonny's godfather, garrotes him to death.

Connie finds out soon after and, though initially angry with Michael for having her husband killed despite his abuse and role in Sonny's murder, she quickly recovers from Rizzi's death and, a few weeks later, apologizes to Michael for accusing him. Free from her abusive and loveless marriage, Connie remarries about a year later. In the film trilogy, however, Connie continues to resent Michael for many years after, and finally reconciles with him after their mother becomes terminally ill and she learns of Fredo's accidental betrayal of the family, begging Michael to forgive him.

== Legacy ==
Carlo Rizzi was portrayed by Gianni Russo, though it was originally offered to NHL star Phil Esposito. The role led to Russo having a career acting as "tough guys" in films and television. Russo's portrayal of Rizzi led him to be the spokesperson for the 2016 brand of Don Corleone Organic Italian Vodka.
