= List of Silver Pictures productions =

This is a list of produced films and television series by Los Angeles–based production company Silver Pictures, established on June 24, 1980, by Hollywood producer Joel Silver, currently run by Hal Sadoff as CEO and Susan Downey. Silver Pictures is also owner of his subsidiary Dark Castle Entertainment, established in 1999 by Silver with Robert Zemeckis and Gilbert Adler, currently run by Downey and Steve Richards.

== Films ==
Year	Film	Director	Distributor	Notes
1984	Streets of Fire	Walter Hill	Universal Pictures	co-produced with RKO Pictures and Gordon Company Productions; first film
1985	Brewster's Millions	Walter Hill	Universal Pictures	
1985	Weird Science	John Hughes	Universal Pictures	co-produced with Hughes Entertainment
1985	Commando	Mark L. Lester	20th Century Fox	
1986	Jumpin' Jack Flash	Penny Marshall	20th Century Fox	co-produced with Lawrence Gordon Productions
1987	Lethal Weapon	Richard Donner	Warner Bros.	
1987	Predator	John McTiernan	20th Century Fox	
1988	Die Hard	John McTiernan	20th Century Fox	co-produced with Gordon Company
1988	Action Jackson	Craig R. Baxley	Lorimar Film Entertainment	
1989	Road House	Rowdy Herrington	United Artists	
1989	Lethal Weapon 2	Richard Donner	Warner Bros.	
1990	Die Hard 2	Renny Harlin	20th Century Fox	
1990	The Adventures of Ford Fairlane	Renny Harlin	20th Century Fox	
1990	Predator 2	Stephen Hopkins	20th Century Fox	
1991	Hudson Hawk	Michael Lehmann	TriStar Pictures	
1991	Ricochet	Russell Mulcahy	Warner Bros.	co-produced with HBO Pictures, Cinema Plus L.P. and Indigo Productions
1991	The Last Boy Scout	Tony Scott	Warner Bros.	co-produced with The Geffen Film Company
1992	Lethal Weapon 3	Richard Donner	Warner Bros.	
1993	Demolition Man	Marco Brambilla	Warner Bros.	
1994	The Hudsucker Proxy	Joel and Ethan Coen	Warner Bros. (North America); PolyGram Filmed Entertainment (International)	co-produced with Working Title Films
1994	Richie Rich	Donald Petrie	Warner Bros.	co-produced with Davis Entertainment and The Harvey Entertainment Company
1995	Assassins	Richard Donner	Warner Bros.	co-produced with Donner/Shuler-Donner Productions
1995	Fair Game	Andrew Sipes	Warner Bros.	
1996	Executive Decision	Stuart Baird	Warner Bros.	
1997	Fathers' Day	Ivan Reitman	Warner Bros.	co-produced with Northern Lights Entertainment
1997	Conspiracy Theory	Richard Donner	Warner Bros.	co-produced with Donner/Shuler-Donner Productions
1997	Midnight in the Garden of Good and Evil	Clint Eastwood	Warner Bros.	co-produced with Malpaso Productions
1998	Lethal Weapon 4	Richard Donner	Warner Bros.	co-produced with Doshudo Productions
1999	The Matrix	The Wachowskis	Warner Bros.	co-produced with Village Roadshow Pictures and Groucho II Film Partnership
2000	Dungeons & Dragons	Courtney Solomon	New Line Cinema	co-produced with Behavior Worldwide and Sweetpea Entertainment
2000	Romeo Must Die	Andrzej Bartkowiak	Warner Bros.	
2001	Exit Wounds	Andrzej Bartkowiak	Warner Bros.	co-produced with Village Roadshow Pictures
2001	Swordfish	Dominic Sena	Warner Bros.	co-produced with Village Roadshow Pictures
2003	Cradle 2 the Grave	Andrzej Bartkowiak	Warner Bros.	
2003	The Matrix Reloaded	The Wachowskis	Warner Bros.	co-produced with Village Roadshow Pictures and NPV Entertainment
2003	The Matrix Revolutions	The Wachowskis	Warner Bros.	co-produced with Village Roadshow Pictures and NPV Entertainment
2005	Kiss Kiss Bang Bang	Shane Black	Warner Bros.	
2006	V for Vendetta	James McTeigue	Warner Bros.	co-produced with Virtual Studios, Anarchos Productions, DC/Vertigo Comics, Medienboard Berlin-Brandenburg and Fünfte Babelsberg Film GmbH
2007	The Invasion	Oliver Hirschbiegel; James McTeigue (uncredited)	Warner Bros.	co-produced with Village Roadshow Pictures and Vertigo Entertainment
2007	The Brave One	Neil Jordan	Warner Bros.	co-produced with Village Roadshow Pictures
2007	Fred Claus	David Dobkin	Warner Bros.	
2008	Speed Racer	The Wachowskis	Warner Bros.	co-produced with Village Roadshow Pictures, Anarchos Productions and Babelsberg Studio
2009	Ninja Assassin	James McTeigue	Warner Bros.	co-produced with Legendary Pictures and Dark Castle Entertainment
2009	Sherlock Holmes	Guy Ritchie	Warner Bros.	co-produced with Village Roadshow Pictures and Wigram Productions
2010	The Book of Eli	The Hughes Bros.	Warner Bros.	co-produced with Alcon Entertainment
2011	Sherlock Holmes: A Game of Shadows	Guy Ritchie	Warner Bros.	co-produced with Village Roadshow Pictures and Wigram Productions
2012	Project X	Nima Nourizadeh	Warner Bros.	co-produced with Green Hat Films
2012	Dragon Eyes	John Hyams	After Dark Films	co-produced with Dark Castle Entertainment and IM Global
2012	Stash House	Eduardo Rodríguez	After Dark Films	co-produced with Dark Castle Entertainment and IM Global
2012	El Gringo	Eduardo Rodríguez	After Dark Films	co-produced with G2 Pictures, IM Global and Tanweer Films
2014	Non-Stop	Jaume Collet-Serra	Universal Pictures	co-produced with TF1 Films Production, Anton Capital Entertainment, Canal+, TF1 and LoveFilm
2015	The Gunman	Pierre Morel	Open Road Films	co-produced with StudioCanal, Anton Capital Entertainment, Canal+, Nostromo Pictures and TF1 Films Production
2016	The Nice Guys	Shane Black	Warner Bros.	co-produced with Waypoint Entertainment and Bloom
2016	Collide	Eran Creevy	Open Road Films	co-produced with IM Global, Sycamore Pictures, DMG Yinji, Hands-on Producers GmbH, 42 and Automatik
2018	Superfly	Director X	Sony Pictures Releasing	co-produced by Columbia Pictures
2024	Road House	Doug Liman	Amazon MGM Studios	co-produced by Metro-Goldwyn-Mayer
TBA	Road House 2	Ilya Naishuller	Amazon MGM Studios	co-produced by Atlas Entertainment and Nine Stories Productions

== Television series ==
Year	Series	Creator	Network	Notes
1999–2000	Action	Chris Thompson	Fox	co-production with Christopher Thompson Productions and Columbia TriStar Television
1999–2000	The Strip	Alfred Gough; Miles Millar	UPN	co-production with Millar Gough Ink and Warner Bros. Television
2000	Freedom	Hans Tobeason	UPN	co-production with Pandemonium Pictures Ltd. and Warner Bros. Television
2004	Next Action Star	N/A	NBC	co-production with Warner Bros. Television, NBC Studios and GRB Entertainment
2004–2007	Veronica Mars	Rob Thomas	UPN (seasons 1–2); The CW (season 3)	co-production with Rob Thomas Productions and Warner Bros. Television
2007–2008	Moonlight	Ron Koslow; Trevor Munson	CBS	co-production with Warner Bros. Television
2014	My Friends Call Me Johnny	N/A	Esquire Network	

== Highest-grossing films ==
Highest-grossing films
Rank	Title	Year	Worldwide gross	Notes
1	The Matrix Reloaded	2003	$741,847,937	Co-produced by Village Roadshow Pictures and NPV Entertainment
2	Sherlock Holmes: A Game of Shadows	2011	$543,848,418	Co-produced by Village Roadshow Pictures and Wigram Productions
3	Sherlock Holmes	2009	$524,028,679	Co-produced by Village Roadshow Pictures and Wigram Productions
4	The Matrix	1999	$467,841,735	Co-produced by Village Roadshow Pictures and Groucho II Film
5	The Matrix Revolutions	2003	$427,344,325	Co-produced by Village Roadshow Pictures and NPV Entertainment
6	Lethal Weapon 3	1992	$321,731,527	
7	Lethal Weapon 4	1998	$285,444,603	Co-produced by Doshudo Productions
8	Die Hard 2	1990	$240,031,274	Co-produced by Gordon Company
9	Lethal Weapon 2	1989	$227,853,986	
10	Nonstop	2014	$222,200,000	
11	Demolition Man	1993	$159,000,000	
12	The Book of Eli	2010	$157,107,755	Co-produced by Alcon Entertainment
13	Swordfish	2001	$147,000,000	
14	Conspiracy Theory	1997	$142,000,000	
15	Die Hard	1988	$141,100,000	
16	V for Vendetta	2005	$134,700,000	
17	Executive Decision	1996	$122,100,000	
18	Lethal Weapon	1987	$120,000,000	
19	The Last Boy Scout	1991	$114,500,000	
20	Project X	2012	$103,000,000	
21	Predator	1987	$98,300,000	
22	Fred Claus	2007	$97,800,000	
23	Hudson Hawk	1991	$97,000,000	
24	Speed Racer	2008	$93,000,000	
25	Romeo Must Die	2001	$91,000,000	
