= Moshe Diamant =

American film producer

- Occupation: Film producer
- Known for: Timecop, The Quest, Maximum Risk, Sudden Death, Tristan & Isolde, The Black Dahlia

Moshe Diamant is an American film producer. He is best known for having started Trans World Entertainment (TWE) in 1983.

== Filmography (Producer) ==
He was a producer in all films unless otherwise noted.

=== Film ===
Year	Film	Credit	Notes
1985	Creature	Executive producer	
1985	Master Class	Executive producer	Direct-to-video
1985	Pray for Death	Executive producer	
1986	Ninja Theater Hosted by Sho Kosugi - "Katana"	Executive producer	Direct-to-video segment used on VHS releases of "Fists of Dragons" and "Diamond Ninja Force"
1986	Ninja Theater Hosted by Sho Kosugi - "Bo"	Executive producer	Direct-to-video segment used on VHS releases of "Shaolin Temple Strikes Back" and "Ninja Champion"
1986	Ninja Theater Hosted by Sho Kosugi - "Ninja Fan"	Executive producer	Direct-to-video segment used on VHS release of "The Little Heroes of Shaolin Temple"
1986	Ninja Theater Hosted by Sho Kosugi - "Tekagi"	Executive producer	Direct-to-video segment used on VHS releases of "Young Hero" and "Golden Ninja Warrior"
1986	Ninja Theater Hosted by Sho Kosugi - "Shikomizue"	Executive producer	Direct-to-video segment used on VHS releases of "Shaolin Drunk Fighter" and "Venus the Ninja"
1986	Ninja Theater Hosted by Sho Kosugi - "Yari"	Executive producer	Direct-to-video segment used on VHS releases of "The Great Massacre" and "The Dragon, The Odds"
1986	Ninja Theater Hosted by Sho Kosugi - "Tonfa"	Executive producer	Direct-to-video segment used on VHS releases of "Ninja Terminator" (PAL) and "Wolfen Ninja"
1986	Ninja Theater Hosted by Sho Kosugi - "Shobo"	Executive producer	Direct-to-video segment used on VHS releases of "Flash Challenger", "Ninja Terminator" and "Challenge the Ninja"
1986	Ninja Theater Hosted by Sho Kosugi - "Self Defense"	Executive producer	Direct-to-video segment used on VHS release of "Eagle Claws Champion"
1986	Ninja Theater Hosted by Sho Kosugi - "Jitte"	Executive producer	Direct-to-video segment used on VHS release of "Phoenix the Ninja"
1986	Ninja Theater Hosted by Sho Kosugi - "Kama"	Executive producer	Direct-to-video segment used on VHS release of "Ninja, The Protector"
1986	Ninja Theater Hosted by Sho Kosugi - "Nunchaku"	Executive producer	Direct-to-video segment used on VHS release of "Kingfisher the Killer"
1986	Ninja Theater Hosted by Sho Kosugi - "Manrki-gusari"	Executive producer	Direct-to-video segment used on VHS release of "Champ Against Champ"
1986	Karatix	Executive producer	Direct-to-Video
1987	Rage of Honor	Executive producer	
1987	Programmed to Kill	Executive producer	
1987	Catch the Heat	Executive producer	
1987	The Curse	Executive producer	
1987	Commando Squad	Executive producer	
1987	Moon in Scorpio	Executive producer	
1987	Survival Game	Executive producer	
1987	The Wild Pair	Executive producer	
1987	Interzone	Executive producer	
1988	Killer Klowns from Outer Space	Executive producer	Uncredited
1988	Kansas	Executive producer	
1988	Seven Hours to Judgment	Executive producer	
1988	High Spirits	Executive producer	
1988	Full Moon in Blue Water	Executive producer	
1989	Sonny Boy	Executive producer	
1989	I, Madman	Executive producer	
1989	Teen Witch	Executive producer	
1989	Night Game	Executive producer	
1989	Ghosts Can't Do It	Executive producer	
1989	Honeymoon Academy	Executive producer	Direct-to-video
1990	Why Me?	Executive producer	
1990	Ski Patrol	Executive producer	
1990	I Come in Peace	Executive producer	Uncredited
1990	Men at Work	Executive producer	
1990	Top Model 2	Executive producer	
1991	Stone Cold		Uncredited
1991	Eyes of an Angel	Executive producer	
1991	Double Impact	Executive producer	
1991	Leather Jackets	Executive producer	
1993	Joshua Tree		Uncredited
1993	Hard Target	Executive producer	
1994	Men of War	Executive producer	
1994	Timecop		
1995	Sudden Death		
1996	The Quest		
1996	Maximum Risk		
1997	Double Team		
1998	Knock Off		Uncredited
1999	Simon Sez		
2001	The Body	Executive producer	
2001	The Musketeer		
2002	FeardotCom		
2002	Extreme Ops		
2004	Spartan		
2004	Imaginary Heroes		
2004	Funky Monkey		
2005	A Sound of Thunder		
2006	Tristan & Isolde		
2006	The Black Dahlia		
2007	Until Death		
2008	The Shepherd: Border Patrol		Direct-to-video
2009	It's Alive	Executive producer	
2009	Beyond a Reasonable Doubt		
2009	Solitary Man	Executive producer	Uncredited
2009	Universal Soldier: Regeneration		
2010	The Eagle Path		
2011	The Ledge		
2011	The Task		
2011	Seconds Apart		
2011	Husk		
2011	Flypaper		
2011	Fertile Ground		
2011	51		
2011	Never Back Down 2: The Beatdown	Executive producer	Direct-to-video
2012	Transit		
2012	Dragon Eyes	Executive producer	
2012	The Philly Kid		
2012	Stash House		
2012	El Gringo		
2012	Universal Soldier: Day of Reckoning		
2013	Legendary	Executive producer	
2013	Dark Circles		
2013	Getaway		
2013	Enemies Closer		
2014	Asylum		
2014	Full Love		
2015	Ruby Strangelove Young Witch		
2015	Re-Kill	Executive producer	
2018	The Hurricane Heist		
2018	Speed Kills	Executive producer	
2019	We Die Young		
2021	The Protégé		
2022	Memory		
2024	Dirty Angels		
2026	Just Play Dead		

Miscellaneous crew

Year	Film	Role	Notes
1987	The Wild Pair	Presenter	
1988	The Further Adventures of Tennessee Buck	Presenter	
1988	Killer Klowns from Outer Space	Presenter	
1988	Seven Hours to Judgment	Production	
1989	I, Madman	Production	
1989	Ghosts Can't Do It	Presenter	
1989	Honeymoon Academy	Presenter	Direct-to-video
1990	Why Me?	Presenter	
1990	Ski Patrol	Presenter	
1990	Waiting for the Light	Presenter	
1990	Bad Influence	Presenter	
1990	The Ambulance	Presenter	
1990	Men at Work	Presenter	
1991	Eyes of an Angel	Presenter	
1991	Leather Jackets	Presenter	

As writer

Year	Film
1995	Midnight Man
1999	Simon Sez
2002	FeardotCom
2012	Universal Soldier: Day of Reckoning

Thanks

Year	Film	Role
1989	Warm Summer Rain	The producers wish to thank
1989	Ghosts Can't Do It	Thanks

=== Television ===
Year	Title	Notes
2011	Scream of the Banshee	Television film
2012	Red Clover	Television film
