= Rachel Miner =

American actress (born 1980)

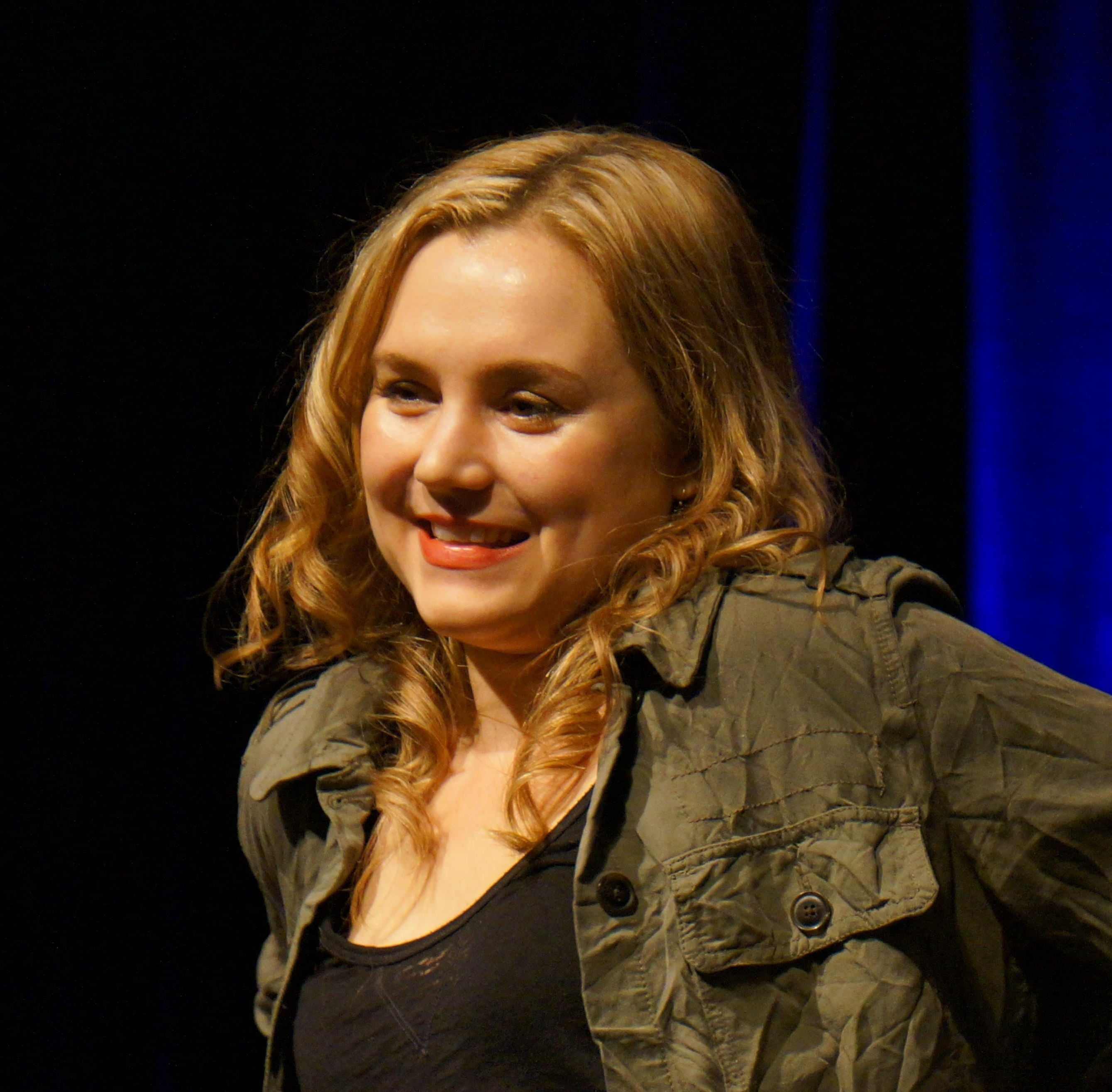
- Miner in 2012
- Born: July 29, 1980 (age 46); Manhattan, New York City, New York, U.S.
- Occupation: Actress
- Years active: 1989–present
- Spouse: Macaulay Culkin (m. 1998; div. 2002)
- Relatives: Worthington Miner (grandfather); Frances Fuller (grandmother)

Rachel Miner (born July 29, 1980) is an American actress. Following her screen debut in Alice (1990), she appeared in films such as Bully (2001), Haven (2004), The Black Dahlia, Penny Dreadful (both 2006), The Butterfly Effect 3: Revelations (2009), and In Their Skin (2012). Outside film, Miner rose to prominence playing Michelle Bauer on the soap opera Guiding Light (1990–1995), and is known for her portrayals of Dani on Californication (2007–2008), Dawn Trager on Sons of Anarchy (2011–2012), and Meg on Supernatural (2009–2020).

== Background ==
Miner is the daughter of director and producer Peter Miner and the granddaughter of director-producer Worthington Miner and actress Frances Fuller. She attended New York's Professional Children's School. In a 1993 interview, Miner named Jodie Foster as the actress she most admired, and expressed the hope that she might have the opportunity to tackle a similar range of roles.

== Acting career ==
Miner's television credits include Vickie in Shining Time Station: 'Tis a Gift (1990), Michelle Bauer on Guiding Light (1990–1995), a guest-starring role as Laurel in the Sex and the City episode "Twenty-something Girls vs. Thirty-something Women", and Astrid in NY-LON.

In 2001, she starred in Bully. The film was based on the murder of Bobby Kent. Bully received mixed reviews from critics and has a "Rotten" rating of 54% on Rotten Tomatoes based on 91 reviews, with an average score of 5.7 out of 10. The film holds a score of 45 out of 100 on Metacritic, based on 26 critics, indicating 'Mixed or average reviews'. Miner won an award at the Stockholm Film Festival for Best Actress.

In the 2005 action film Circadian Rhythm, Miner portrayed a young woman on a journey to discover who she is and why multiple enemies want her dead. The movie was critically ignored, and was poorly received in its few reviews. One reviewer stated that the film was a "directionless jumble of boring scenes strung together tenuously by a plot that feels like they were making it up as they went along," and that watching the film's allegedly ‘wire-fu’ fight scenes was akin to "being over at a friend's house when they’re getting yelled at by their parents."

She appeared in 12 episodes of the 2007 television series Californication, as Dani California, a reference to a character appearing in several songs by the Red Hot Chili Peppers. In 2008, she appeared in "The Sacrifice", an episode of Fear Itself. That same year she was also cast as the second lead in the psychological thriller The Butterfly Effect 3: Revelations. The movie was filmed in Michigan and concluded filming in October 2008. It debuted at After Dark Horrorfest III, a horror film festival held in January 2009. The film was released on DVD on March 31, 2009.

From 2009 to 2013, Miner took over the role of Meg, a recurring antagonist and demon in Supernatural. The writers wanted Meg's original actress Nicki Aycox to reprise the role in later seasons, but ultimately cast Miner for storyline purposes. The character was killed off later. Tim Janson of Mania gave Miner's portrayal of Meg a positive review, saying no one played Meg "with such dripping sarcasm as Rachel Miner". He felt she "always adds spice when she appears". Similarly, Diana Steenbergen of IGN felt Miner played the role "with vicious flair" and "[conveyed] Meg's brutality well, right from the beginning". As time passed, she noted that the actress "has done well taking over the role". In 2020, Miner returned to Supernatural during the fifteenth season playing the character of a cosmic entity known as the Empty that takes Meg's physical appearance. Miner reappeared later in the season, reprising the role of the Empty.

In 2010, Miner starred alongside James Franco in the Grasshopper segment of Love & Distrust. The next year she was cast as Sgt. Hannah in the horror film 51, which began filming in April 2011 in Louisiana. The film was released in limited theaters as part of "After Dark Originals".

== Charity work ==
Since September 2017, Miner has been the executive director of the non-profit organization Random Acts.

== Personal life ==
In 1998, she married actor Macaulay Culkin, when they were both 17. The couple separated in 2000 and divorced in 2002. In 2000, Miner dated Brad Renfro during and after production of Bully.

Miner has been a vegetarian since age 9.

Miner was diagnosed with multiple sclerosis in 2010. She has since become an advocate for representation of disabled characters.

== Filmography ==
=== Film ===
Year	Title	Role	Notes
1990	Alice	12-year-old Alice	
1990	Shining Time Station: 'Tis A Gift	Vickie	TV Movie
1997	Henry Fool	Girl in Library No. 3	
1999	Joe the King	Patty	
2001	Bully	Lisa Connely	Won – Stockholm Film Festival for Best Actress
2004	Haven	Eva	
2005	Man of God	Karen Cohen	Direct to-DVD
2005	Little Athens	Allison	Direct to-DVD
2005	Circadian Rhythm	Sarah	
2006	Fatwa	Cassie Davidson	Direct to-DVD
2006	Love & Debate	Sophia	Direct to-DVD
2006	The Black Dahlia	Martha Linscott	
2006	Onion Underwater	Tara	Short film
2006	Grasshopper	Terri	Short film
2006	Penny Dreadful	Penny Deerborn	
2006	The Still Life	Robin	
2007	Cult	Mindy	Direct to-DVD
2007	The Blue Hour	Julie	
2007	The Memory Thief	Mira	Direct to-DVD
2007	Tooth & Nail	Neon	Direct to-DVD
2008	Hide	Betty	
2008	The Butterfly Effect 3: Revelations	Jenna Reid	Direct to-DVD
2009	Life of Lemon	Esther	Direct to-DVD
2010	The Love Affair	Karen Hall	Short film
2010	Love & Distrust	Terri	Direct to-DVD
2011	51	Sgt. Hannah	TV Movie
2012	In Their Skin	Jane	
2013	Frank the Bastard	Clair	

=== Television ===
Year	Title	Role	Notes
1990–1995	Guiding Light	Michelle Bauer	Recurring character Won – Young Artist Award for Best Young Actress in a Daytime Series (1992, 1994); Nominated – Young Artist Award for Best Young Actress in a Daytime Series (1993, 1995); Nominated – Soap Opera Digest Award for Outstanding Child Actor (1993, 1994); Nominated – Daytime Emmy for Outstanding Younger Leading Actress in a Drama Series (1995)
1995	American Experience	Various characters	Episode: "The Orphan Trains"
1999	Sex and the City	Laurel	Episode: "Twenty-Something Girls vs. Thirty-Something Women"
2004	NY-LON	Astrid	
2005	Bones	Mary Costello	Episode: "The Girl in the Fridge"
2006	Medium	Emilia 'Lia' Purcell	Episode: "Lucky in Love"
2006	CSI: Crime Scene Investigation	Valerie Whitehall	Episode: "Rashomama"
2006	Without a Trace	Julia Martic	Episode: "Damage Done"
2007–2008	Californication	Dani	Recurring character
2008	Fear Itself	Chelsea	Episode: "The Sacrifice"
2008	The Cleaner	Sarah Gibbons	Episode: "The Eleventh Hour"
2008	Life	Squeaky Uhry	Episode: "Canyon Flowers"
2009	CSI: Miami	Tammy Witten	Episode: "Presumed Guilty"
2009–2013 2020	Supernatural	Meg Masters The Empty	7 Episodes 3 episodes
2009	Psycho Girlfriend	Meagan	Episode: "The New Girl"
2009–2010	The Online Gamer	Beth	2 episodes
2010	Cold Case	Anna Coulson	Episode: "Two Weddings"
2010	No Ordinary Family	Rebecca Jessup	Episode: "No Ordinary Quake"
2010	Terriers	Eleanor Gosney	2 episodes
2010	Army Wives	Jasmine Wilkes	Episode: "Deadly Force"
2011	Criminal Minds	Molly Grandin	Episode: "Today I Do"
2011–2012	Sons of Anarchy	Dawn Trager	2 episodes
2012	Person of Interest	Root	Episode: ”Root Cause”
2020	Chicago Fire	Jennifer Davis	Episode: "Protect a Child"

== Music videos ==
- "Sunday", Sonic Youth (1998)
- "Only One", Yellowcard (2005)
