= Joel Silver =

American film producer (born 1952)

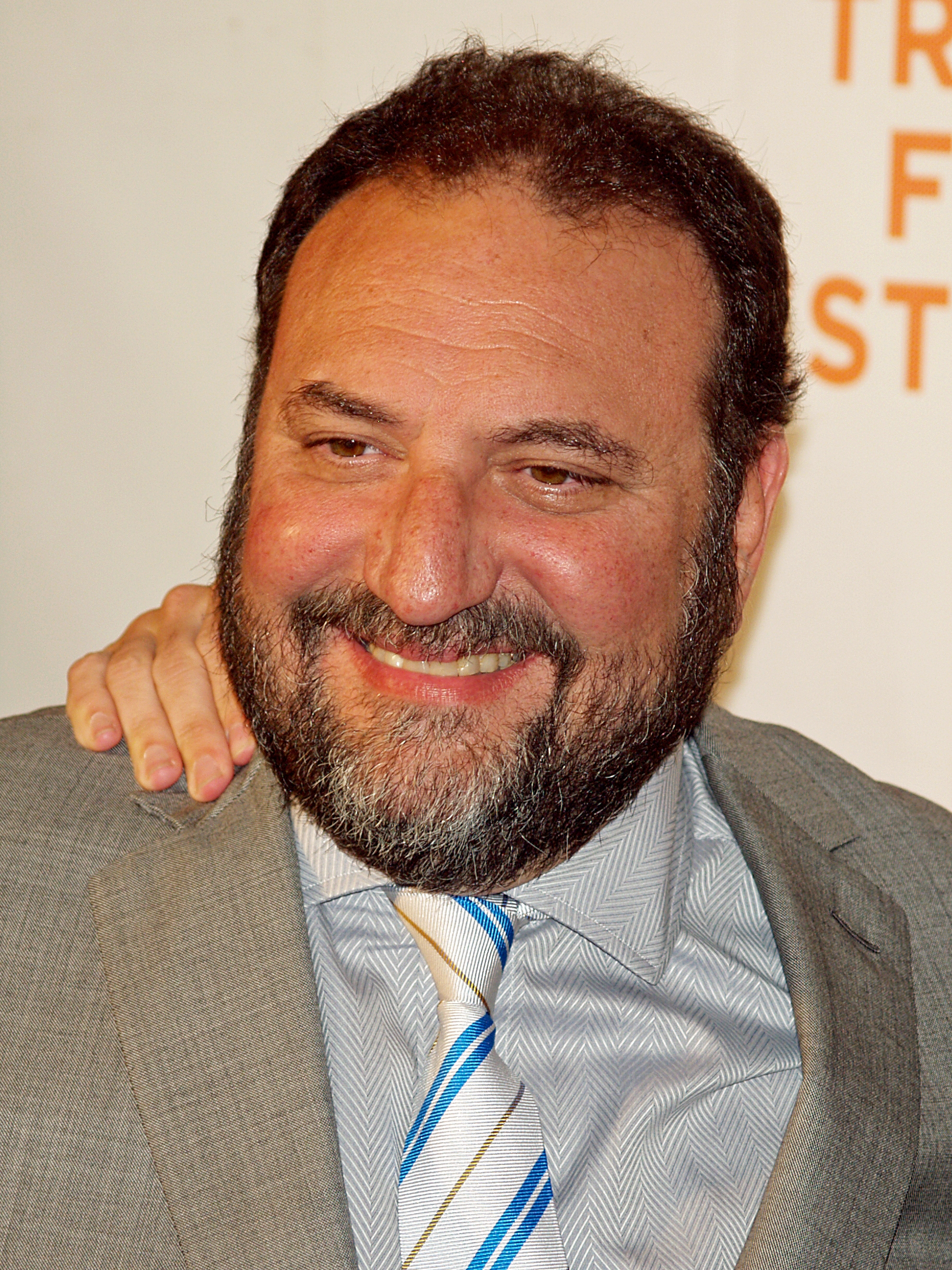
- Silver at the Tribeca Film Festival in May 2008
- Born: July 14, 1952 (age 74); South Orange, New Jersey, U.S.
- Occupation: Film producer
- Years active: 1976–present
- Spouse: Karyn Fields (m. 1999; div. 2020)
- Children: 2

Joel Silver (born July 14, 1952) is an American film producer. He started his career at Lawrence Gordon Productions, where he eventually became president of motion pictures for the company. He earned his first screen credit as the associate producer on The Warriors and, with Gordon, produced 48 Hrs., Streets of Fire, and Brewster's Millions.

== Early life and education ==
Silver was born and raised in South Orange, New Jersey, the son of a writer and a public relations executive. His family is Jewish. He attended Columbia High School in Maplewood, New Jersey. During his time there, Silver, Buzzy Hellring, and Jonny Hines created the rules for what he called "Ultimate Frisbee". He was later inducted into the USA Ultimate Hall of Fame as a result of this. He finished his undergraduate studies at the New York University's Tisch School of the Arts.

== Career ==
Silver began his career at Lawrence Gordon Productions, where he eventually became president of motion pictures for the company. He earned his first screen credit as the associate producer on The Warriors and, with Gordon, produced 48 Hrs., Streets of Fire, and Brewster's Millions. In 1985, he formed Silver Pictures and produced successful action films such as Commando (1985), the Lethal Weapon franchise, the first two films of the Die Hard series, as well as the first two films of the Predator series and The Matrix franchise of action films.

Silver appears on-screen at the beginning of Who Framed Roger Rabbit as Raoul J. Raoul, the director of the animated short Something's Cookin. Raoul loses his temper at toon Roger Rabbit for seeing tweety birds when a refrigerator crashes on his head, and not stars as the script specified. Casting Silver in this role was a prank Steven Spielberg and Robert Zemeckis pulled on then-Disney CEO Michael Eisner, as Eisner and Silver had despised each other since their days at Paramount Pictures in the early 1980s, especially with the issues they faced making 48 Hrs. Silver trimmed his beard off, paid his expenses, and asked to not have his name in initial cast lists. Reportedly, when production wrapped, because Silver was unrecognizable, Eisner questioned who played Raoul and was told it was Silver, at which point, Eisner shrugged and praised his performance.

Silver directed "Split Personality", (1992), an episode of the HBO horror anthology Tales from the Crypt.

In 1996, he set up Decade Entertainment with Richard Donner to make low budget films with new talent financed by HBO, The Kushner-Locke Company and Republic Pictures, with its first production being Double Tap (1997). In 1998, he set up Dark Castle Entertainment, co-owned by Robert Zemeckis. In 2000, Zinc Entertainment was launched as a low-budget division of Silver Pictures, with its first production being Proximity (2000) and Decade Entertainment ceasing to produce films.

Silver is also known for his eccentric temper, inspiring characters based on him in movies such as Grand Canyon, True Romance and I'll Do Anything. The character of Les Grossman (played by Tom Cruise) in the movie Tropic Thunder, is a parody of Silver. Actor Rick Moranis parodied Silver on SCTV in the skit The Larry Siegel Talk Show.

He also voiced "the police chief" in the 2001 film Osmosis Jones in an uncredited role.

On June 24, 2019, Silver Pictures CEO Hal Sadoff announced that Silver had resigned from the company. Two days later, The Hollywood Reporter cited unnamed sources claiming that Silver's overspending, dearth of recent box-office hits, and an animosity between Silver and financier Daryl Katz led to his departure. No official reason has yet been given by the Katz Group, Silver Pictures, or Silver himself.

On November 30, 2023, Silver was fired as a producer of Play Dirty by Amazon Studios.

=== Frank Lloyd Wright houses and automobiles ===
Silver is well known as an aficionado of architect Frank Lloyd Wright. In 1984, he bought the Wright-designed Storer House in Hollywood and made considerable investments to restore it to its original condition. The Storer House's squarish relief ornament then became the company logo of Silver Pictures. Silver sold it in 2002 for $2.9 million. In 1986, he purchased the long-neglected C. Leigh Stevens Auldbrass Plantation in Yemassee, South Carolina, and has been restoring it since then. Both restorations have been managed and supervised by the architect Eric Lloyd Wright (grandson of Frank Lloyd Wright).

Silver has also owned and restored two Lincoln Continental automobiles previously owned by Wright, one a 1940 convertible and the other a 1941 coupe. After the 1940 car was damaged, Wright had a body shop rebuild the car based on his custom redesign. For a time both cars were displayed in the Storer House.

=== Carmel Musgrove incident ===
On August 19, 2015, Silver's 28-year-old assistant Carmel Musgrove drowned in a lagoon while working on vacation with Silver and his family in Bora Bora. Later, in August 2017, Musgrove's family sued Silver and his assistant Martin Herold, arguing the latter had provided her with cocaine, which, along with alcohol consumption and exhaustion from work, they alleged had contributed to her death. Silver was exonerated in February 2021 by a Los Angeles judge.

== Filmography ==
=== Producer ===
Film

- Xanadu (1980) (co-producer)
- 48 Hrs. (1982)
- Streets of Fire (1984)
- Brewster's Millions (1985)
- Weird Science (1985)
- Commando (1985)
- Jumpin' Jack Flash (1986)
- Lethal Weapon (1987)
- Predator (1987)
- Action Jackson (1988)
- Die Hard (1988)
- Road House (1989)
- Lethal Weapon 2 (1989)
- Die Hard 2 (1990)
- The Adventures of Ford Fairlane (1990)
- Predator 2 (1990)
- Hudson Hawk (1991)
- Ricochet (1991)
- The Last Boy Scout (1991)
- Lethal Weapon 3 (1992)
- Demolition Man (1993)
- Richie Rich (1994)
- Assassins (1995)
- Fair Game (1995)
- The First 100 Years: A Celebration of American Movies (1995) (TV documentary film)
- Executive Decision (1996)
- Fathers' Day (1997)
- Conspiracy Theory (1997)
- Double Tap (1997)
- Lethal Weapon 4 (1998)
- The Matrix (1999)
- Made Men (1999)
- House on Haunted Hill (1999)
- Romeo Must Die (2000)
- Exit Wounds (2001)
- Swordfish (2001)
- Thirteen Ghosts (2001)
- Ghost Ship (2002)
- Cradle 2 the Grave (2003)
- The Matrix Reloaded (2003)
- The Matrix Revolutions (2003)
- Gothika (2003)
- House of Wax (2005)
- Kiss Kiss Bang Bang (2005)
- V for Vendetta (2006)
- The Reaping (2007)
- The Invasion (2007)
- The Brave One (2007)
- Fred Claus (2007)
- Speed Racer (2008)
- RocknRolla (2008)
- Orphan (2009)
- Whiteout (2009)
- Ninja Assassin (2009)
- Sherlock Holmes (2009)
- The Book of Eli (2010)
- The Losers (2010)
- Unknown (2011)
- Sherlock Holmes: A Game of Shadows (2011)
- Dragon Eyes (2012)
- Stash House (2012)
- The Apparition (2012)
- The Factory (2012)
- Getaway (2013)
- Non-Stop (2014)
- The Nice Guys (2016)
- Collide (2016)
- Superfly (2018)
- Road House (2024)
- Road House 2 (TBA)

=== Executive producer ===
Film

- Jekyll and Hyde... Together Again (1982)
- Streets of Fire (1982)
- Demon Knight (1995)
- Bordello of Blood (1996)
- Dungeons & Dragons (2000)
- Proximity (2000)
- Ritual (2000)
- The Animatrix (2003) (direct-to-video)
- Return to House on Haunted Hill (2007) (direct-to-video)
- The Hills Run Red (2009) (direct-to-video)
- Splice (2009)
- Transit (2012)
- Project X (2012)
- The Philly Kid (2012)
- El Gringo (2012)
- Bullet to the Head (2012)
- Getaway (2013)
- Enemies Closer (2013)
- Veronica Mars (2014)
- Suburbicon (2017)

TV series

- Tales from the Crypt (1989–1996)
- Secrets of the Cryptkeeper's Haunted House (1996–1997)
- Perversions of Science (1997)
- The Strip (1999–2000)
- Action (1999)
- Freedom (2000)
- Next Action Star (2004)
- The Studio (2005)
- Veronica Mars (2004–2007)
- Moonlight (2007–2008)
- My Friends Call Me Johnny (2014)
- Twist (TBA)

TV movies

- Parker Kane (1990)
- W.E.I.R.D. World (1995)
- Jane Doe (2001)
- Newton (2003)
- Future Tense (2003)
- Bet Your Life (2004)
- Prodigy (2004)
- The Odds (2010)
- Hail Mary (2011)

=== Acting roles ===
Film

Year	Title	Role	Notes
1988	Who Framed Roger Rabbit	Raoul J. Raoul	
2001	Osmosis Jones	Police Chief	Uncredited voice role

Television

Year	Title	Role	Episode
1991	Tales from the Crypt	Crypt Keeper's Chainsaw Victim (Uncredited)	"Split Second"
2007	Entourage	Himself	"Less Than 30"

=== Other credits ===
Film

Year	Title	Role
1978	The End	Assistant to producer
1978	Hooper	Assistant to executive producer
1979	The Warriors	Associate producer
1981	The Pursuit of D. B. Cooper	Creative consultant

Television

Year	Title	Credit	Notes
1976	The Bette Midler Show	Assistant to the producer	TV special
1983	The Renegades	Production executive	
1992	Tales from the Crypt	Director	Episode "Split Personality"
1999	Tales from the Cryptkeeper	Special thanks	
