= Courtney Solomon =

Canadian film producer, director (b.1970)

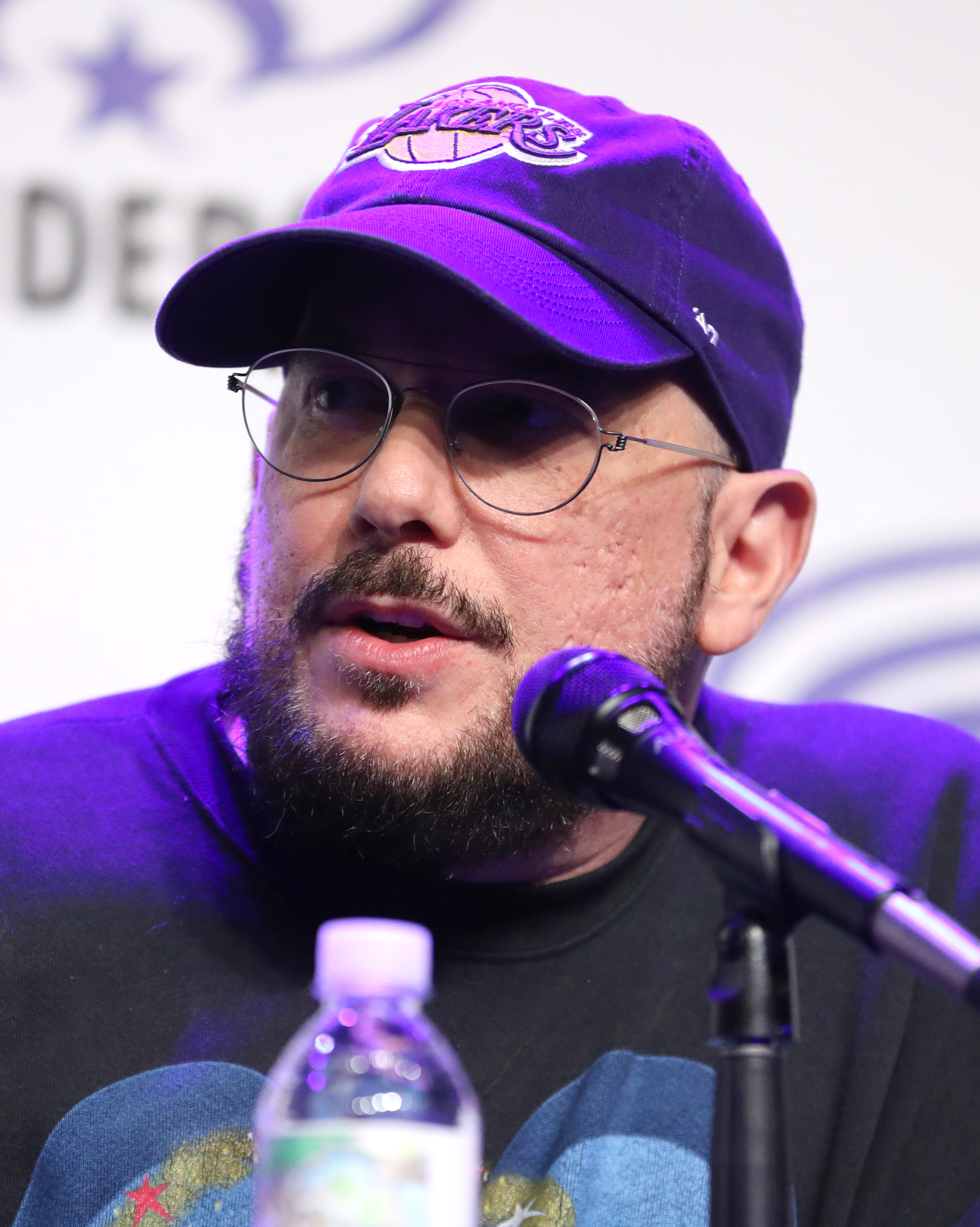
- Solomon at the 2024 WonderCon
- Born: September 1, 1970 (age 55); Toronto, Ontario, Canada
- Occupations: Producer; director; screenwriter
- Years active: 2000–present
- Employer: After Dark Films

Courtney Solomon (born September 1, 1970) is a film producer from Toronto, Ontario. He has been involved with production, marketing, and distribution of over 80 movies. In 2000, at the age of 29, he produced and directed the film Dungeons & Dragons.

== Career ==
At 19, Solomon formed Sweetpea Entertainment to acquire the film rights to "Dungeons & Dragons". Dungeons & Dragons became his first production and direction project. It was both a box office and critical disappointment

As owner of Sweetpea Entertainment, Solomon sought to acquire media rights for potential adaptation into television series or MMORPGs. In 1996, in exchange for the equity position and media rights to Traveller, Sweetpea advanced the funds to establish Imperium Games, a company dedicated solely to Traveller.

He later formed After Dark Films to produce horror, thriller, and action titles. He launched it with An American Haunting, which he wrote, produced, and directed. It is a story based on Tennessee's Bell Witch legend. It opened #2 in the US, staying in the top ten films for 6 weeks. This success resulted in a long-term distribution and co-production arrangement with Lionsgate Films. Today, After Dark owns its own film library of over 80 films.

In 2014, Solomon partnered with Mark Canton on a number of films, including Cake. Other films were Mr. Church (Eddie Murphy), The Comedian (Robert De Niro and Leslie Mann), The Yellow Birds (Tye Sheridan, Alden Ehrenreich, Jack Huston, Jennifer Aniston, and Toni Collette), and Burn Your Maps (Vera Farmiga and Jacob Tremblay).

In 2018, he acquired the rights to and produced the first film based on the novel series After. The film of the same name was released in April 2019. The sequel, After We Collided, was released in 2020. In the same year, he also acquired the rights to the underground comic universe of the Fabulous Furry Freak Brothers created by Gilbert Shelton in 1968.

== Filmography ==
Year	Title	Director	Producer	Writer
2000	Dungeons & Dragons	Yes	Yes	No
2005	An American Haunting	Yes	Yes	Yes
2013	Getaway	Yes	Yes	No

Producer only

- Dungeons & Dragons: Wrath of the Dragon God (2005)
- Captivity (2007)
- Universal Soldier: Regeneration (2009)
- The Butterfly Effect 3: Revelations (2009)
- Slaughter (2009)
- Perkins' 14 (2009)
- Beyond a Reasonable Doubt (2009)
- Prowl (2010)
- The Task (2011)
- Seconds Apart (2011)
- Husk (2011)
- Fertile Ground (2011)
- 51 (2011)
- Scream of the Banshee (2011)
- Transit (2012)
- Bullet to the Head (2012)
- Dragon Eyes (2012)
- El Gringo (2012)
- The Philly Kid (2012)
- Universal Soldier: Day of Reckoning (2012)
- Stash House (2012)
- Dark Circles (2013)
- Enemies Closer (2013)
- Ritual (2013)
- Murder in the Dark (2013)
- Cake (2014)
- Re-Kill (2015)
- Bastard (2015)
- The Wicked Within (2015)
- Wind Walkers (2015)
- Mr. Church (2016)
- Burn Your Maps (2016)
- The Comedian (2016)
- The Yellow Birds (2017)
- Nightmare Cinema (2018)
- The Woman in the Window (2021)
- The Strangers: Chapter 1 (2024)
- The Strangers – Chapter 2 (2025)
- Red Sonja (2025)
- The Strangers – Chapter 3 (2026)
