= Ysabella Brave =

American singer

- Born: December 4, 1979 (age 46); California, United States
- Label: Cordless
- Website: ysabellabrave.com

Ysabella Brave is an American YouTube personality, artist, vocalist, singer and songwriter signed by Cordless Recordings, a division of the Warner Music Group. She was discovered through the popularity of her YouTube channels, Ysabella Brave and ysabellabravetalk.

== Career ==
Brave was signed as a recording artist for Cordless Recordings, an e-label of the Warner Music Group.

Brave has worked as a fraud analyst for Yahoo! and studied at San Jose State University. She was a finalist in the Miss Horrorfest 2006 contest and has had other show business experience.

=== YouTube videos ===
Brave is a YouTube personality. She posted the first videos of herself singing on YouTube on July 14, 2006. Most of her songs are accompanied by prerecorded music tracks, but some are a cappella. Her singing genres include blues, jazz, the Great American Songbook, rock, soul, R&B, and pop music, amongst others, as well as some of her own original lyrics and music.

Brave's second YouTube channel, ysabellabravetalk, was created on February 25, 2007, to separate her music and comedy videos from those in which she expresses personal opinions on subjects raised by her viewers, and her vlogs.

Brave is mentioned prominently in the book YouTube for Dummies, written by Doug Sahlin and Chris Botello and published by Wiley Publishing, ISBN 978-0-470-14925-6. Brave is also mentioned prominently in the book 15 Minutes of Fame: Becoming a Star in the YouTube Revolution, written by Frederick Levy, ISBN 978-1-59257-765-1.

== See also ==
- List of YouTube celebrities
