= Eduardo Rodríguez (director) =

Venezuelan film director and screenwriter

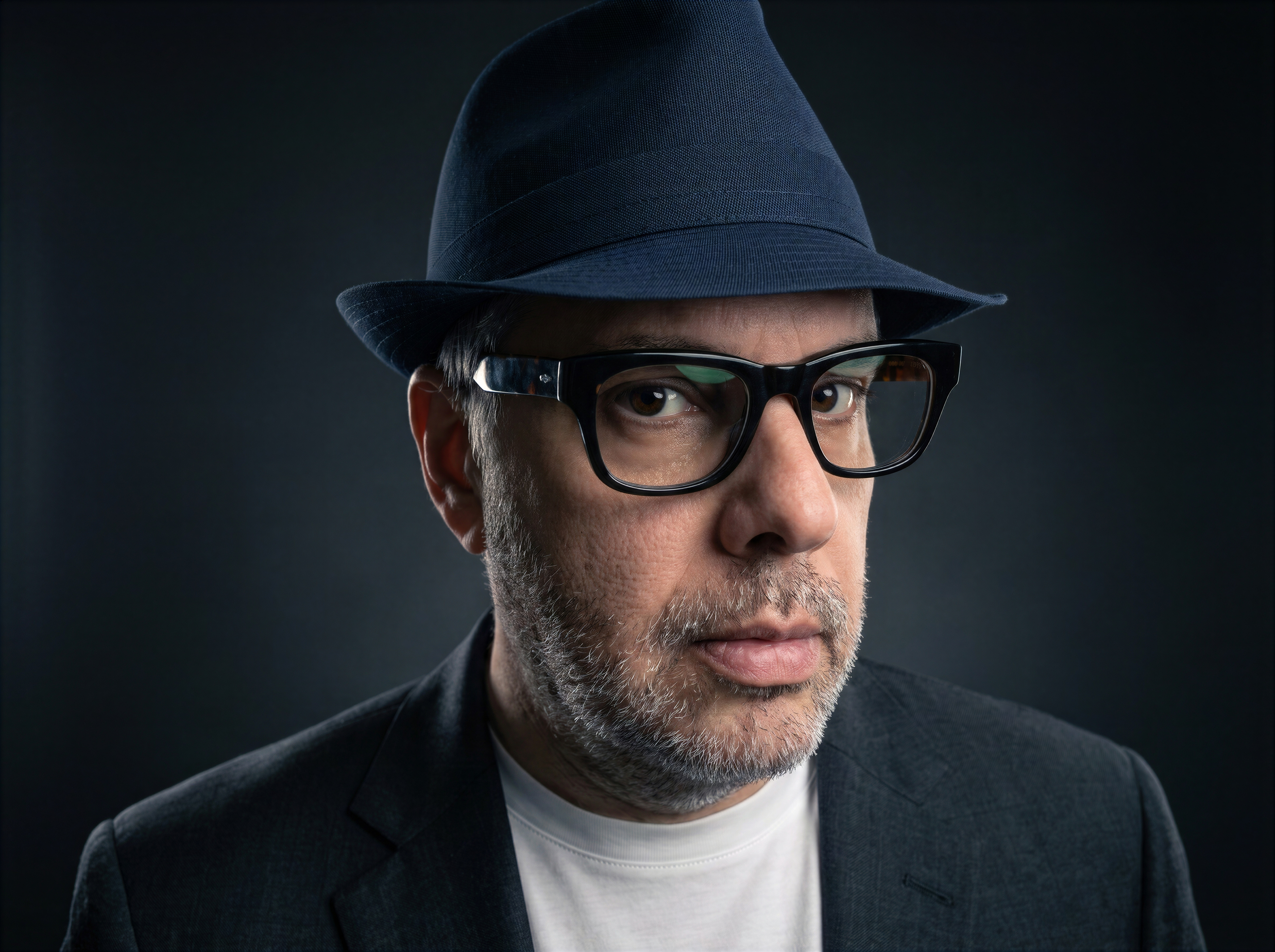
- Born: Venezuela
- Occupations: Film director, screenwriter

Eduardo Rodríguez is a Venezuelan film director and screenwriter whose professional career in the United States began after Bob Weinstein, founder of Dimension Films, offered Eduardo a contract to direct three feature films in 2002. Details of his unusual deal were featured on the front page of Variety on April 17, 2002, as well in articles from Entertainment Weekly (May 3, 2002) and Premiere Magazine (August 2002). Eduardo was also anointed a member of Entertainment Weekly's 2002 "It List" of the 100 most creative people in entertainment.

== Career ==
He made the 15-minute 35mm short Daughter as his thesis project at Florida State University in Tallahassee, FL, where he received his M.F.A. in August 2001. After graduation, Eduardo toured the festival circuit where Daughter was screened and honored at more than twenty national and international film festivals. To top it all off, for one of the few times in the history of the Cannes Film Festival, his student film Daughter was selected to compete in the professional short film category at the 55th annual celebration of this international event.

Before moving to Florida, Eduardo studied communications at Universidad Catolica Andres Bello in his native Venezuela and was an editor for commercials and TV shows for several years.

In 2005, Eduardo completed his first feature film, entitled Curandero, which was produced by Dimension Films and written and executive produced by Robert Rodriguez. The film had its US premiere in 2005 at the Screamfest Film Festival.

In 2006, he directed the reshoot of several scenes for The Messengers, which was released by Screen Gems on the first quarter of 2007.

In 2008, Eduardo wrote and directed a Web series called Blood Cell which was originally produced by 60 Frames and was later bought by Warner Bros. Interactive.

In 2009, Eduardo directed an episode of the NBC horror anthology Fear Itself entitled The Circle, which was included in the Fear Itself: The Complete First Season DVD.

In 2010, he directed an episode for America's Most Wanted entitled Jose Corona.

In 2011, Eduardo directed two movies consecutively for After Dark Films and Silver Pictures. Stash House with Dolph Lundgren and El Gringo with Scott Adkins and Christian Slater, and were released simultaneously theatrically and on VOD on May 11, 2012.

In 2012, Eduardo helmed Fright Night 2: New Blood, starring Jaime Murray, for Twentieth Century Fox Home Entertainment. The movie was released on October 1, 2013.

In 2016, he directed the short film Inwards, starring Johnny Whitworth, which was released on December that year.

In 2020, You're Not Alone Eduardo's indie directorial debut, starring Katia Winter, was released on VOD where available.

In 2021, the horror film The Darkness Of The Road, which he wrote and directed, was released on DVD and VOD where available.

Pushing into new narrative frontiers, Eduardo created his first AI short film, LENS, in 2026. Since its debut at the Beyond Border International Film Festival, the film has been selected by 20+ international film festivals and has received multiple awards, including Best AI Sci-Fi at the World AI Cinema Festival in Cannes.

== Filmography ==
Short film

Year	Title	Director	Producer	Editor	Writer	Prompter
2002	Daughter	Yes	No	Yes	Yes	No
2016	Gylt	No	Yes	No	No	No
2016	Inwards	Yes	Yes	Yes	Yes	No
2019	Detox	No	No	Yes	No	No
2026	LENS (AI Film)	No	Yes	Yes	Yes	Yes

Feature film

Year	Title	Director	Editor	Writer	Notes
2005	Curandero	Yes	Yes	Yes	
2007	The Messengers	Uncredited	No	No	Reshoots
2012	Stash House	Yes	Yes	No	
2012	El Gringo	Yes	Yes	No	
2013	Fright Night 2: New Blood	Yes	No	No	Direct-to-video
2020	You're Not Alone	Yes	Yes	No	
2021	The Darkness of the Road	Yes	No	Yes	
TBD	The Dragon's Egg	No	No	Story	

Television

Year	Title	Director	Producer	Editor	Writer	Creator	Notes
2008	Blood Cell	Yes	Yes	Yes	Yes	Yes	Web series
2009	Fear Itself	Yes	No	No	No	No	Episode "The Circle"
2010	America's Most Wanted	No	Yes	No	No	No	First segment in episode "Jose Corona"
2017	Clear Blue Skies	No	Yes	No	No	No	Miniseries
