= Amy Shiels =

Irish actress

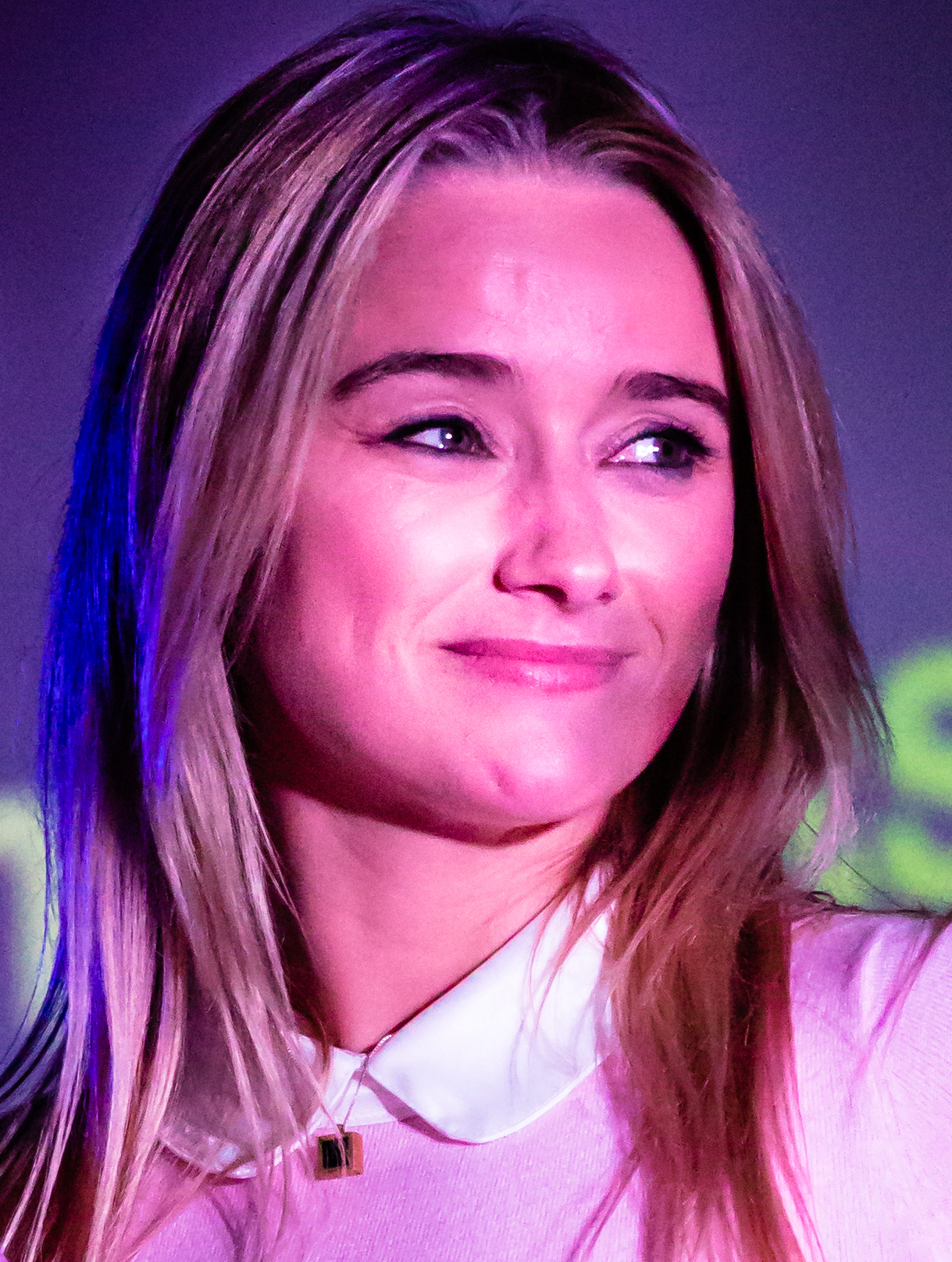
- Shiels in 2017
- Born: 1991 (age 34–35); Dublin, Ireland
- Occupation: Actress
- Years active: 2001–present

Amy Shiels (born 1991) is an Irish film and television actress who has appeared in the films Veronica Guerin, Slaughter, Twin Peaks, the video game Final Fantasy XV, and the Call of Duty franchise.

== Early life and family ==
Shiels was born in 1991 in Dublin, the seventh child in a large family. She was the cousin of actor Karl Shiels.

== Career ==
Shiels worked in the troupe of the Gaiety Theatre, Dublin for three years and began to appear in Irish and British television series. Her debut in a big movie was a role in the film Veronica Guerin with Cate Blanchett in the lead role. She performed a number of roles in films of independent American filmmakers: in 2009 she played in the movie Slaughter, in 2012 she performed a role in the film Citadel.

Since 2012, she began to voice the characters of video games, including: Call of Duty: Black Ops III, Call of Duty 4: Modern Warfare, Final Fantasy XV, and Divinity: Dragon Commander. In 2014, she moved to live in Los Angeles to further develop her acting career.

In 2015, she was cast in Twin Peaks: The Return.
