= Getaway (2013 film) =

- Theatrical release poster
- Directed by: Courtney Solomon
- Written by: Gregg Maxwell Parker; Sean Finegan
- Produced by: Courtney Solomon; Steve Richards; Moshe Diamant; Joel Silver
- Starring: Ethan Hawke; Selena Gomez; Jon Voight; Rebecca Budig; Bruce Payne
- Cinematography: Yaron Levy
- Edited by: Ryan Dufrene
- Music by: Justin Burnett
- Production companies: Dark Castle Entertainment; Signature Entertainment; After Dark Films; Silver Reel
- Distributed by: Warner Bros. Pictures
- Release dates: August 26, 2013 (Los Angeles); August 30, 2013 (United States)
- Running time: 90 minutes
- Country: United States
- Language: English
- Budget: $18 million
- Box office: $11.8 million

Getaway is a 2013 American action thriller film starring Ethan Hawke, Selena Gomez, James Maslow and Jon Voight. Directed by Courtney Solomon and written by Gregg Maxwell Parker and Sean Finegan, the film is distributed by Warner Bros. Pictures. Though originally reported to be a remake of the 1972 film The Getaway, the film is actually an original story. This is the first film directed by Solomon in eight years, with his last being 2005's An American Haunting. The film was a critical and commercial failure, grossing $11.8 million against its $18 million budget.

== Plot ==
Once a celebrated race car driver, Brent Magna returns to a ransacked home and the horrifying discovery that his wife, Leanne, is missing. A chilling phone call soon follows from a mysterious man known only as The Voice, who claims responsibility for Leanne's abduction. The Voice reveals out a terrifying ultimatum: Magna must execute a set of dangerous tasks without fail if he ever wants to see his wife again. His first order is to steal a unique Shelby Mustang from a secure parking garage, with The Voice making it brutally clear that any deviation from his commands, or capture by the authorities, will result in Leanne's death.

Magna sees two police officers chasing him and speeds off. Being a skilled driver, he is able to evade them with ease, eventually setting a trap to cause one to crash into the other. Despite more police cars joining the pursuit, Magna is able to out maneuver them, after which he is again contacted by The Voice, who directs him towards his next task. He tells Magna to speed up and take some perilous turns, eventually being forced to crash through a park, ice rink, and shopping center, nearly killing numerous civilians in the process. The Voice calls to congratulate him and tells him to keep moving. Magna is ordered to crash into a water truck and run through a red lighted intersection, causing accidents in his wake. Magna is then ordered to park in a construction zone and await further instructions.

While Magna is waiting, a young woman (known only as the Kid), armed with a gun, attempts to steal Magna's car, but Magna overpowers her and takes her gun, and then takes her with him on The Voice's orders – at some point, the Voice orders Magna to kill The Kid, but Magna refuses, to which The Voice replies that keeping her alive was the right choice, as he will need her help. As Magna and The Kid drive off, with more police in pursuit, she reveals that the Mustang is, in fact, her car, and that she was told by a police officer that it was stolen. Magna realizes that their meeting was orchestrated by The Voice.

After the Voice assigns Magna another destructive task, The Kid reveals herself as a skilled computer hacker and the daughter of the CEO of a large bank. The Voice contacts Magna again and orders him to upload the contents of a USB flash drive into a computer before 11:30 pm. Upon reaching the designated area (a power plant), The Kid attempts to hack the computer in order to contact the police. She appears to succeed, only for The Voice to reveal that he set up the computer as a trap for her, framing her as the person who destroyed the plant. The plant suddenly overloads and explodes, blacking out a large portion of the city.

The Voice gives Magna his final task: to rob the bank owned by The Kid's father. The Kid points out that there is no actual money at her father's bank – it is rather an investment firm which holds all of its assets on computers. Gradually, the duo realizes that they are not actually committing a heist, but are merely providing a distraction for the police while The Voice executes the real robbery and subsequently frames them for it.

As The Voice's men attempt to commandeer an armored car carrying sensitive hard drives, Magna surprises and overpowers them, succeeding in taking the drives. Now fleeing from the police and The Voice's men simultaneously, Magna calls The Voice and offers to release the hard drives in exchange for his wife. The Voice accepts and directs him to an airplane hangar. While it appears that Leanne is about to be returned, The Kid deduces that The Voice is planning to have them all killed once the deal is done. As Magna, Leanne and The Kid attempt to escape, the police arrive, and in the ensuing chaos, a man Magna assumes to be The Voice grabs The Kid and drives off with her. Magna leaves Leanne with the police and pursues.

Following a high speed chase, both cars are destroyed, Magna rescues The Kid, and the police arrest the mysterious man. Leanne and Magna are reunited. However, Magna receives a phone call from The Voice, revealing that the man who was busted was no more than a decoy, and thanking Magna for his help and for hanging up.

It is then revealed that The Voice was in fact controlling the entire operation from a bar in the United States. He checks his balance, revealing that almost 3 billion dollars have been transferred to his account, and walks out of the bar.

== Cast ==
- Ethan Hawke as Brent Magna
- Selena Gomez as The Kid
- Jon Voight as The Voice
- Rebecca Budig as Leanne Magna
- Paul Freeman as The Man
- Bruce Payne as Distinguished Man
- James Maslow as Max

== Reception ==
=== Box office ===
The film was released in the United States on August 30, 2013. The film was due for UK release on October 4, 2013, but was rescheduled to December 6, 2013. Getaway opened in 2,130 theaters in North America and debuted to $4.5 million with an average of $2,115 per theater, ranking 9th at the box office. The film dropped 56% in its second weekend and grossed $2.8 million. After 35 days in theaters the film earned $10.5 million domestically and $1.3 million internationally for a worldwide total of $11.8 million, below its production budget of $18 million. Variety listed Getaway as one of "Hollywood's biggest box office bombs of 2013".

=== Critical response ===
Getaway was widely panned by critics. Review aggregator Rotten Tomatoes reports that 4% of 140 critics gave the film a positive review, with an average rating of 2.73/10. The site's critical consensus states: "Monotonously fast-paced to the point of exhaustion, Getaway offers a reminder of the dangers in attempting to speed past coherent editing, character development, sensible dialogue, and an interesting plot." On Metacritic the film has a weighted average score of 22 out of 100, based on 34 critics indicating "generally unfavorable" reviews. Audiences polled by CinemaScore gave the film an average grade of "C+" on an A+ to F scale.

Matt Patches of IGN gave the film a score of 3/10, saying: "Not even the gruffly likable Ethan Hawke can make the murky, messy car chase movie Getaway worthwhile thanks to its inane script and poorly conceived action sequences". Selena Gomez's performance was also criticized by Christopher Orr of The Atlantic, with the actress being described as "a kid trying desperately to act like a grownup, but with no real idea what that might entail". John DeFore of The Hollywood Reporter called it a "brainless chase flick that doesn't even offer guilty pleasures." Scott Foundas of Variety said in his review, "Solomon has made something like a 'Cannonball Run' for the YouTube Generation, with the largely incoherent action photographed (by cinematographer Yaron Levy) from dozens of small digital cameras mounted inside and outside the Shelby and cut in a Cuisinart". Charlotte O'Sullivan of the Evening Standard gave the film 1/5 stars, writing that it was "One of the worst films of the year, by a country mile." Peter Howell of the Toronto Star gave the film 0.5/4 stars, describing it as "94 gruelling minutes of car chases, explosions and grimaces."

=== Accolades ===
At the 34th Golden Raspberry Awards, Selena Gomez was nominated in the Worst Actress category, ultimately losing to Tyler Perry in drag in A Madea Christmas.
