= Perkins' 14 =

- Promotional film poster
- Directed by: Craig Singer
- Screenplay by: Lane Shadgett (screenplay)
- Produced by: Jeremy Donaldson; Matthew Kuipers; Christopher Milburn; Courtney Solomon
- Starring: Patrick O'Kane; Shayla Beesley; Mihaela Mihut; Michale Graves
- Cinematography: John Sosenko
- Distributed by: After Dark Horrorfest
- Release date: March 31, 2009
- Running time: 95 minutes
- Country: United States
- Language: English / Spanish [dubbed]

Perkins' 14 is a 2009 horror film originated by Jeremy Donaldson, written by Lane Shadgett, and directed by Craig Singer. The film is produced by Jeremy Donaldson, Matthew Kuipers, and Christopher Milburn. The film was released theatrically nationwide January 9, 2009. The DVD which includes the 10 making-of webisodes from the Massify Ghosts in the Machine Competition was released on March 31, 2009.

== Plot ==
10 years after Officer Dwayne Hopper’s son disappeared, the last of 14 victims in a string of local unsolved disappearances, his suspicions are aroused by prison inmate Ronald Perkins. Dwayne searches Perkins’ house and discovers a collection of torture videos featuring the missing victims from the past. In a fit of rage, Dwayne kills Perkins.

But things get complicated when a wave of carnage sweeps the town, with reports of Dwayne’s own son amongst the marauding psychopaths. A number of flashbacks start to reveal that Hopper's son was kidnapped from his home, wondering if his son is still alive. Earlier in the film, Hopper begins to question Perkins' motive for knowing that Hopper has a family, namely his wife and daughter.

After doing some digging on Perkins' file, Hopper comes to a horrible realization that Perkins kidnapped his son years ago. Hopper tries to help him, but arrives too late. Hopper then shows Perkins the file and tells him he doesn't have a family. He calls his deputy, Hal, to come down to the station to see if the man in the cell is the killer he had been looking for, but Hal becomes skeptical at this.

He then looks through Perkins' personal belongings and realizes that there is no record of Ronald Perkins living in town. A friend of the judge tells him that they will have search warrant in the morning, but Hopper decides to call his deputy to look at Perkins' home and finds a backroom in the basement full of scientific equipment. Hal notices a cage with someone inside and gets attacked by a crazed woman. During their conversation, Perkins reveals that his own family was killed by a burglar to Hopper.

Perkins tries to sympathize with Hopper over the loss of someone they loved. Meanwhile, Hopper's daughter is out with her friends, unaware that someone nearby is watching them. Daisy and her boyfriend run for their lives after two of their friends are murdered. Her father arrives just in time to save her and shoots the suspect. To their shock, the suspect comes back to life and is run over. The chief of police decides to declare a state of emergency.

Hopper finds out that his own son is still alive as he witnesses him killing someone in the street. Hopper's wife, Janine, is having an affair after her son disappeared. Daisy tells her father that Janine is at a motel with her boyfriend, whom she witnesses being beaten to death by a woman with a champagne bottle. A local holds Daisy's boyfriend, Eric, at knifepoint when he tells Hopper that everyone is dead. Hopper realizes that Perkins wanted to get revenge by taking 14 children with him.

They arrive at the motel to find Janine safe and sound. Hopper then leads the killers into a fight, while Janine, Daisy, and Eric seek shelter at the police station to wait for help. A deputy and the others decide to seek safety in the basement after learning they are inside. Eric is then ripped to pieces by the killers. Hopper then arrives with a shotgun and kills them. They start hearing Felicity, an animal rights activist, calling for help from one of the cells.

Hopper also realizes that Perkins took the kids to make the townspeople suffer the way he suffered. Felicity hears a strange noise in the bathroom, where she is attacked and killed by someone hiding in the ceiling. The deputy realized that there was no way out. Hopper's son tries to attack him, but the deputy holds them at gunpoint, resulting in him being shot dead by Hopper. Janine volunteers to get help, where Hopper promises to take care of Daisy if anything should happen to her.

Hopper and Daisy watch on the video monitor as the killers plan an ambush, where they attack and kill Janine, much to their horror. Hopper tries to handle the situation himself without endangering Daisy. He then gives her a shotgun to protect herself. Hopper tries to reason with his son, "Kyle", while police sirens start to approach the station. Hopper wants Kyle to remember his lost childhood, such as playing chess. Kyle kills Hopper by snapping his neck. Kyle then kills Daisy with a shotgun when he ignores his sister's pleas for mercy.

== Cast ==
- Patrick O'Kane as Dwayne Hopper
- Shayla Beesley as Daisy Hopper
- Mihaela Mihut as Janine Hopper
- Michale Graves as Eric Ross
- Gregory O'Connor as Grodsky
- Katherine Pawlak as Felicity
- Richard Brake as Ronald Perkins
- Craig Robert Young as Mitch James
- Trey Farley as Scott
- CJ Singer as Kyle Hopper
- Sean Farragher as Pete
- Josh Davidson as The Stranger

== Production ==
The film was developed online at Massify.com. Writers uploaded story concepts and actors submitted audition videos. The winning idea was submitted by Jeremy Donaldson. Filmed on locations in Romania, and produced by After Dark Films, and Massify in association with FanLib.

== Release ==
Perkins' 14 premiered at the After Dark Horrorfest on January 9, 2009. It would later have its DVD premiere on March 31 the same year.
