= Sean Carrigan =

American actor

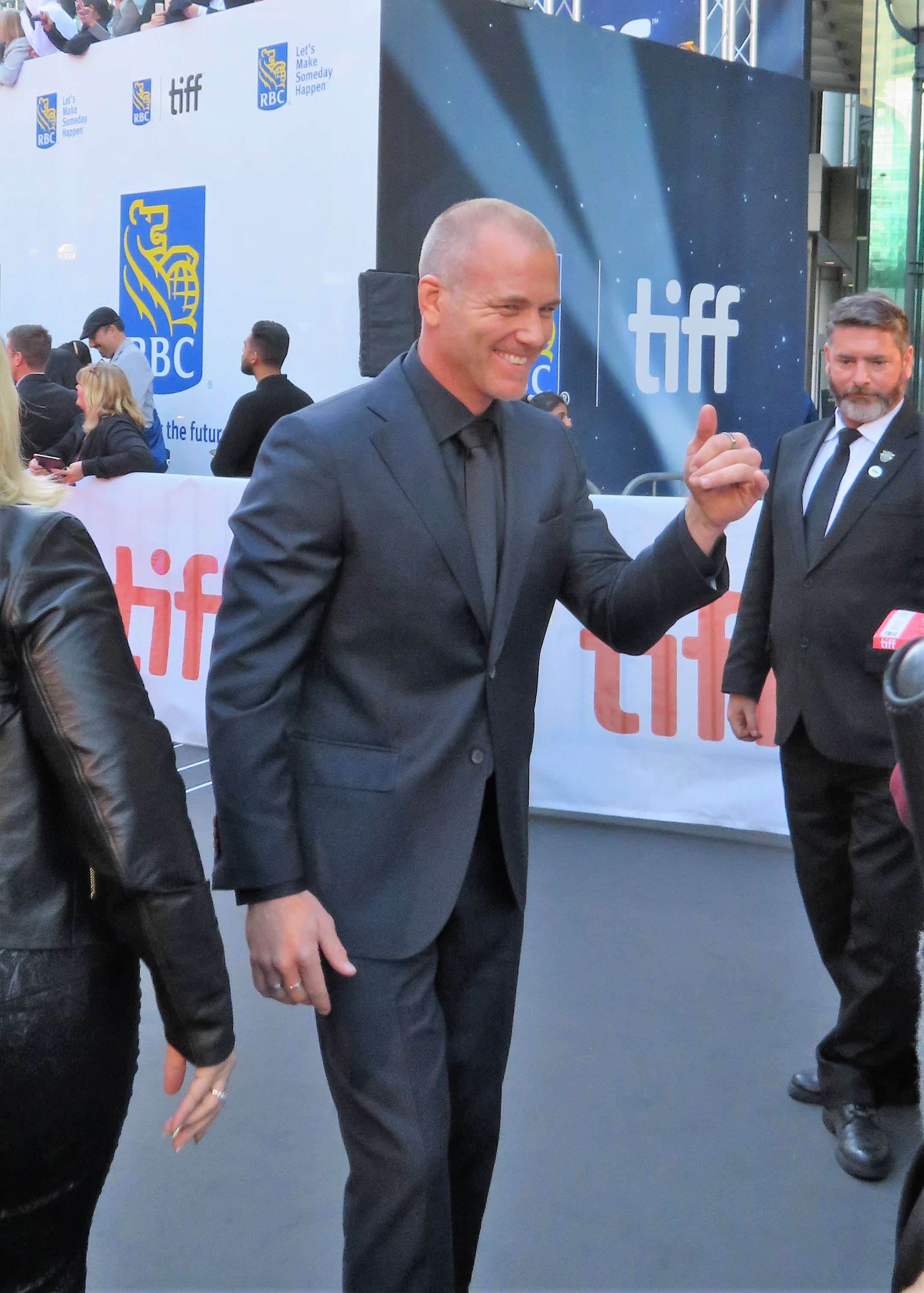
- Other name: Cato
- Occupations: Actor, producer, stand-up comedian, former boxer
- Years active: 1998–present
- Height: 6 ft (183 cm)

Sean Carrigan (born May 16, 1974) is an American actor, producer, stand-up comedian, and former professional boxer best known for his roles as Coach Ivan Garrett on the CW's series All American, his 4-year run as Dr. Ben "Stitch" Rayburn on the TV drama The Young and the Restless., and his comedic role as Coach Rafferty in the Emmy nominated Netflix comedy American Vandal.

== Personal life ==
Sean Carrigan grew up in Miami Springs, FL and is an alumnus of Miami Springs Senior High School where he was an All State wrestler and GMAC Champ. Carrigan was also an NCAA Division 1 wrestler and CAA Conference Finalist in college.

== Career ==
Sean started his career as a professional boxer in 1998, and ended it in 1999. Since then, he has appeared in numerous films, TV shows and commercials, and can be seen doing stand-up comedy across North America.

In May 2013, he was hired for a four episode arc as Dr. Ben "Stitch" Rayburn on the CBS television soap opera The Young and the Restless, his first airdate being June 28. After serving as a recurring character for almost half a year he was offered a contract in November 2013.

Sean has appeared in numerous television productions, including CBS’s NCIS: Hawai‘i, NCIS, and NCIS: Los Angeles; Apple TV’s Everyone Is Doing Great; Netflix’s Lucifer; FX’s Dave; ABC’s Grey’s Anatomy and Modern Family; The CW’s Hart of Dixie; and Lifetime’s Call Me Crazy, where he starred opposite Academy Award winner Jennifer Hudson under the direction of Ashley Judd.

On the film side, Sean has appeared in Tyler Perry’s The Single Moms Club, Walt Disney’s John Carter, and the Oscar-nominated Ford v Ferrari, where he portrayed Walt Hansgen.

Most recently, Sean can be seen in Grace Point, where he takes on the intimidating antagonist role of Luther Stone, now streaming on Apple TV and Amazon Prime.

== Filmography ==
Film
Year	Title	Role	Notes
2002	Mary/Mary	Brian	
2012	John Carter	Cavalryman	
2013	Lost on Purpose	Jack Shaw	
2014	The Single Moms Club	Tony	
2014	Playing It Cool	Actor	
2014	Strangely in Love	Steve	
2017	Small Town Crime	Julian	
2019	Low Low	Jason	
2019	Ford v Ferrari	Walt Hansgen	

Television
Year	Title	Role	Notes
2002	Scrubs	Paul	Episode: "My Balancing Act"
2004	Next Action Star	Himself	Winner
2004	Cold Case	Greg Barnes (1980)	Episode: "Glued"
2004	Bet Your Life	Sonny Briggs	TV movie
2010	Heroes	Police Officer	Episode: "Chapter Thirteen 'Let It Bleed'"
2010	House	Guy	Episode: "The Down Low"
2010	NCIS: Los Angeles	Craig Mangold	Episode: "Hand-to-Gand"
2010	Grey's Anatomy	Todd	Episode: "Superfreak"
2011	Criminal Minds	Lamott	Episode: "Supply and Demand"
2011	The Event	Devon	Recurring, 11 episodes
2011	The Closer	Sergeant Stanton	Episode: "Death Warrant"
2011	Casual: The Series	Alan	Web series, Episode: "A Start/End - Part 2"
2011	Hart of Dixie	Jimmy Praboo	Episode: "Homecoming & Coming Home"
2012	Up All Night	Craig	Episode: "Travel Day"
2012	Touch	Security Guard	Episode: "Gyre, Part 2"
2012	Common Law	Prince	Episode: "Gun!"
2012–13	The Flip Side		7 episodes
2013	Call Me Crazy: A Five Film	Leonard	TV movie
2013	Sketchy	Cop	Episode: "Freaky Friday the 13th"
2013	Modern Family	John	Episode: "A Fair to Remember"
2013–17, 21	The Young and the Restless	Stitch Rayburn	Recurring: June 28 – December 20, 2013; 2016–2017; Contract: December 31, 2013 – 2016
2017	American Vandal	Coach Rafferty	Recurring, 6 episodes
2018	Living with the Boyfriend	Property Manager	Episode: "Ashley and Ryan Get Evicted"
2019	Lucifer	Vince Walker	Episode: "Orgy Pants to Work""
2019	My Death Co	Officer	Episode: "The Bystander"
2020	Dave		Episode: "Jail"
2020	Dead of Night	Captain Yeager	Episode: "The Hunt For Ada Isn't Stopping"
2021	Everyone Is Doing Great	Michael Niccoli	3 episodes
2021	On the Verge	John	2 episodes
2021-22	All American	Ivan Garrett	8 episodes
2022	S.W.A.T.	Purdue	Episode: "Unraveling"
