= Slaughter (2009 film) =

- Directed by: Stewart Hopewell
- Written by: Stewart Hopewell
- Produced by: Stephanie Caleb; Laura Ivey; Courtney Solomon
- Starring: Lucy Holt; Amy Shiels; David Sterne
- Cinematography: Marius Ivascu; Armando Salas
- Edited by: Greg O'Bryant
- Music by: Justin Caine Burnett
- Production company: After Dark Films
- Distributed by: After Dark Films
- Release date: January 9, 2009 (Horrorfest)
- Running time: 96 minutes
- Country: United States
- Language: English

Slaughter is a 2009 American horror film written and directed by Stewart Hopewell. It was part of the third After Dark Horrorfest.

== Plot ==
Faith is a young woman trapped in a relationship with her abusive boyfriend, Jimmy. She flees from him and moves to Atlanta to start over again. As Faith begins her new life, she meets a fun and free-spirited young woman named Lola. Lola lives on a farm with her controlling father, Jorgen, her older brother, and her younger brother. Faith and Lola become good friends, and Lola invites Faith to live with her family to help with the farm work. During the day, the family (and Faith) work on the farm, and at night, the two young women go out on the town to party in Atlanta. Lola brings home a different man every night. Eventually, Faith notices that these men disappear after their encounters with Lola, and she suspects that Lola's father is murdering them in the farm's slaughterhouse.

== Cast ==
- Amy Shiels as Faith
- David Sterne as Jorgen
- Lucy Holt as Lola
- Vance Daniels as Jimmy
- CJ Singer as Arvin
- Maxim Knight as Cort

== Production ==
The film was originally titled Faithless. It was shot in Romania, where two of the producers had a strong working relationship. The script was originally written in 2006, but it was not produced until later, when a producer became associated with After Dark. It was based on a true story from 100 years ago that was modernized.

== Reception ==
Slaughter received negative reviews. Joshua Siebalt of Dread Central rated the film 0.5/5 stars and called it "the single most boring film I have ever seen on the big screen from any genre." Dennis Harvey of Variety wrote that the film tests horror fans' patience with its long buildup, but the climax is grisly enough to satisfy them. David Johnson of DVD Verdict called it "a mediocre outing" with a few memorable scenes. Cameron McGaughy of DVD Talk rated it 1/5 stars and wrote that it fails to deliver on its exploitative title.
