= Sam Stockman =

British actor

- Born: 19 May 1982 (age 44); London, England
- Other name: Sammy Stockman
- Occupations: Actor, musician
- Years active: 1992–present

Sam Stockman (born 19 May 1982) is an English actor and musician, whose most notable acting role is as DC Emerson Kent on the UK crime drama Whitechapel from 2009 to 2013.

== Acting career ==
Stockman began acting at the age of 10 in the independent film B&B. Since then he has also appeared on the UK soap Family Affairs, several episodes of Holby City as the troubled drug addict James Hope, in the 1999 film Don't Go Breaking My Heart, the 2011 Christmas special of Doctor Who and the 2011 film The Task. He appeared in the acclaimed UK crime drama Whitechapel as DC Emerson Kent for the duration of the series, between 2009 and 2013.

== Filmography ==
Year	Project	Role	Notes
1992	B&B	Darren	
1992	Desmond's	John / Sam	TV series (2 episodes: 1992-1993)
1993	The Upper Hand	Kevin	TV series (1 episode: "The Price Is Right")
1994	The Bill	Kevin Beardsley	TV series (1 episode: "Games")
1994	Hard Times	Young Bitzer	TV series (1 episode: "1x02")
1995	Annie: A Royal Adventure!	James	TV movie
1999	Don't Go Breaking My Heart	David	
2002	Smallpox 2002: Silent Weapon	Sean Cooper	TV movie
2002	Family Affairs	Lewis Davenport	TV series (41 episodes: 2002-2004)
2004	It Shouldn't Happen on a TV Soap	Himself	TV documentary
2005	Totally Frank	Steve	TV series (1 episode: "Bed")
2005	McDonald's		TV commercial
2005	DWP – Department for Work and Pensions		TV commercial
2006–07	Holby City	James Hope	TV series (16 episodes)
2008	Wire in the Blood	Mark Baron	TV series (2 episodes: "From The Defeated: Part 1 & Part 2")
2009	Scoop	Simon	TV series (13 episodes)
2009	Whitechapel	DC Emerson Kent	TV series (18 episodes: 2009–2013)
2011	The Task	Scelzi	TV movie
2011	Hollow	James	TV movie
2011	Doctor Who	Co-Pilot	TV series (1 episode: "The Doctor, the Widow and the Wardrobe")
2012	Crime Stories	Ashley Moore	1 episode
2012	Pointless	Himself	TV series (1 episode: "2x08")
2014	Holby City	James Hope	TV series (17 episodes: 2006-2014)
2015	The Coroner	Anthony Light	TV series (1 episode: "Gilt")
2016	Undercover	PC Rose	TV series (4 episodes)
2016	Suspects	Stan Turner	TV series (3 episodes)

== Musicianship ==
While maintaining a successful acting career, Stockman also relentlessly pursued his passion for music. For a time he made up one quarter of the band Shepherd's Pi, along with Claire Russell and former Family Affairs co-stars Angela Hazeldine and his on-screen brother, Rupert Hill. The band later split over musical differences.

Stockman and Hazeldine went on to form The Circus Electric. The band released a debut LP and played gigs across the country to positive reviews. The band, despite its success, was disbanded in pursuit of something new.

Stockman is now a member of the band Colour of Bone.
