= Wes Chatham =

American actor (born 1978)

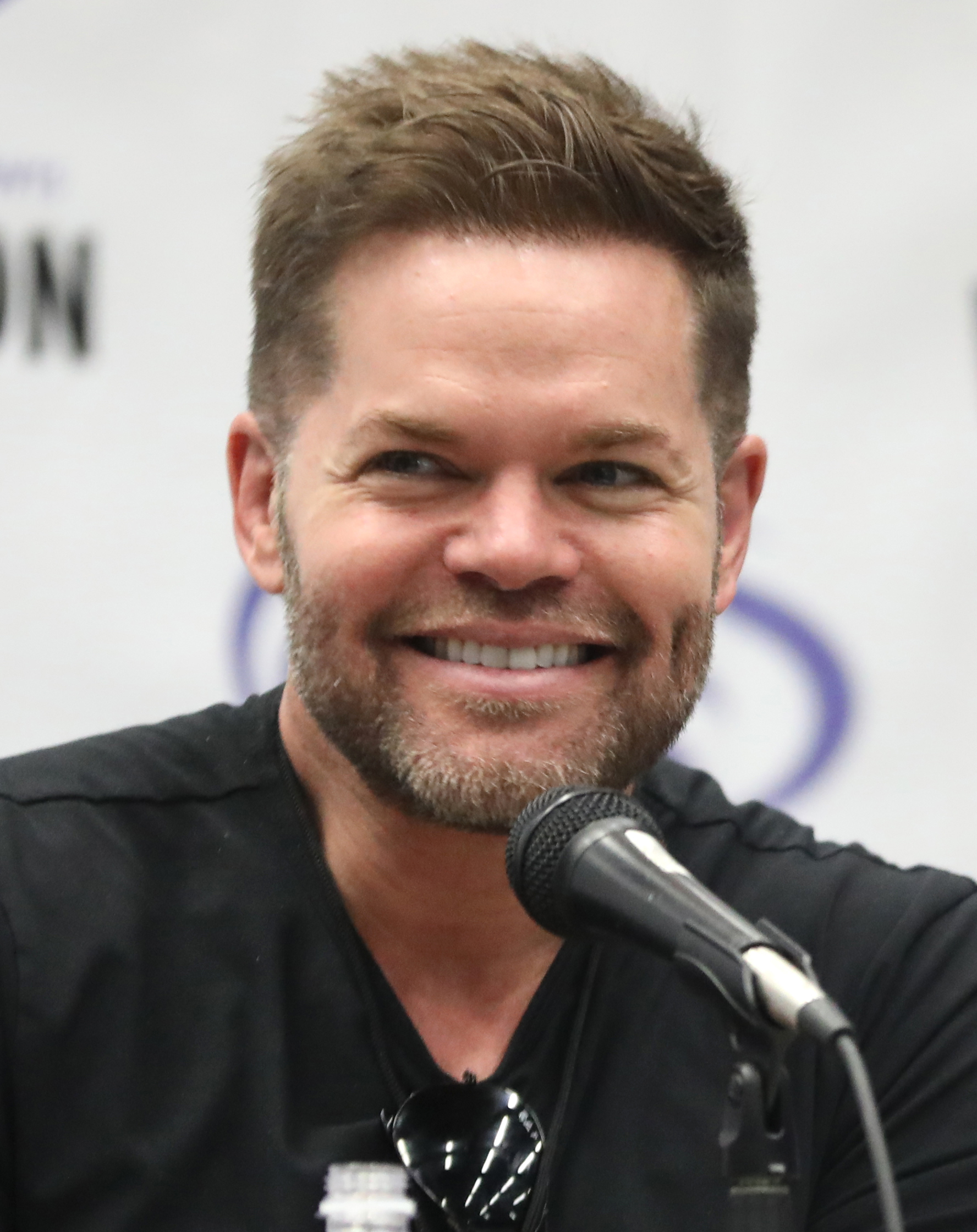
- Chatham at the 2024 WonderCon
- Born: October 11, 1978 (age 48); Atlanta, Georgia, United States
- Occupation: Actor
- Years active: 2003–present
- Spouse: Jenn Brown (m. 2012)
- Children: 2
- Military career
- Allegiance: United States
- Branch: United States Navy
- Service years: 1997–2001
- Rank: Petty Officer Third Class (E-4)
- Unit: USS Essex (LHD-2)
- Website: officialweschatham.com

Wes Chatham (born October 11, 1978) is an American actor. He has appeared in films such as In the Valley of Elah, W., The Help, and The Philly Kid, and played Castor in The Hunger Games: Mockingjay – Part 1 and Part 2. Between 2015 and 2022, he starred as Amos Burton in The Expanse.

== Early life ==
Chatham was born on October 11, 1978 in Atlanta. At the age of 7, he got his first acting job in Tide commercials.

After graduating from high school, Chatham joined the U.S. Navy in the rating of Aviation Boatswain's Mate. He worked as an aviation firefighter on the flight deck of the USS Essex, working in crash and salvage for four years, reaching the rank of Petty Officer Third Class.

== Acting career ==
Chatham's break into acting came just three months before his tour was finished when Denzel Washington chose his ship to shoot the movie Antwone Fisher. Chatham was amongst those selected by casting director Robi Reed while Reed was searching for authentic-looking military personnel for the movie. This was Chatham's first movie-making experience, which led to further pursuit of his lifelong dream of acting. Following Antwone Fisher, Reed convinced Chatham to move to Hollywood and shortly thereafter cast him in his first series regular role on Showtime's Barbershop.

Chatham gained further attention when Paul Haggis cast him alongside Tommy Lee Jones as Corporal Steve Penning in In the Valley of Elah. In 2009, Chatham went on to work with Oliver Stone in W. as Frank Benedict, George W's fraternity brother. The following year, Chatham landed another series regular role on the hit CBS TV military action drama The Unit. Chatham was cast as new unit team member Staff Sergeant Sam McBride (aka Whiplash), working with David Mamet and Shawn Ryan. Chatham also starred as Brian Danielson in Brett Simmons’ Husk (2011).

Chatham portrayed Carlton Phelan, the brother of Emma Stone's character, in the 2011 film The Help. The cast won a 2012 Screen Actors Guild Award for Outstanding Performance by a Cast in a Motion Picture. In 2012, Chatham landed his first title role in Joel Silver's The Philly Kid. A fan of mixed martial arts, Chatham dove into the character of Dillion McGwire, performing all of his own stunts. The film debuted in theaters May 2012. Following The Philly Kid, Chatham starred in This Thing With Sarah, which was accepted to the San Diego Film Festival in October 2013. In 2013 Chatham wrapped two studio films, Broken Horses (2013) and The Town That Dreaded Sundown (2014).

Between 2015 and 2022, Chatham starred as Amos Burton in the Amazon Prime Video TV series The Expanse. In 2021, he started co-hosting Ty & That Guy Podcast with Ty Franck, discussing episodes of The Expanse, inspirations from genre culture, and occasionally inviting guests, including Thomas Jane, Daniel Abraham and Brett Simmons.

== Personal life ==
Chatham is married to TV personality Jenn Brown. Together they have two sons, John Nash, born in 2014, and Rhett Jameson, born in 2016. Chatham missed the birth of Nash, as he was filming episode 2 of The Expanse and his son was born while Chatham was in the air, flying back from Toronto, where they filmed.

== Filmography ==
Film
Year	Title	Role	Notes
2003	The Fighting Temptations	Cashier	
2007	In the Valley of Elah	Corporal Steve Penning	
2008	W.	Fraternity Enforcer	
2011	Husk	Brian	
2011	The Help	Carlton Phelan	
2012	The Philly Kid	Dillon "The Philly Kid" McGuire	
2013	Baby Bleed	Daddy	Short film
2014	This Thing with Sarah	Ethan	
2014	The Town That Dreaded Sundown	Corporal Danny Torrens	
2014	The Hunger Games: Mockingjay – Part 1	Castor	
2015	Broken Horses	"Ace"	
2015	The Hunger Games: Mockingjay – Part 2	Castor	
2016	All I See Is You	Daniel	
2018	Escape Plan 2: Hades	Jaspar Kimbral	
2020	Tenet	SWAT 3	
2023	Squealer	Jack	
2026	The Fix	Alex	

Television
Year	Title	Role	Notes
2005–2006	Barbershop	Isaac	10 Episodes, as John Wesley Chatham
2005	Sleeper Cell	Frat Boy	Episode: "Al-Faitha", as John Wesley Chatham
2009	The Unit	Staff Sergeant Sam McBride	8 Episodes
2012	Political Animals	Gunner Cox	Episode: "Lost Boys"
2012	The Mentalist	Vince	Episode: "Cherry Picked"
2014–2017	Hand of God	Shane Caldwell	2 Episodes
2015–2022	The Expanse	Amos Burton	Series Regular
2017	The Night Shift	Clark	Episode: "Keep the Faith"
2023	NCIS: Hawaiʻi	Brother Ellis Kane	Episode: "Shields Up"
2023	Ahsoka	Captain Enoch	3 episodes
2025-2026	Sheriff Country	Dawson Raines/Alec Kane	Episodes: "The Sixth Man", “Out of Office”, "The Hunting Party", "The Gambler", "Compromised", "Mexico"
2026	Cross	Donnie	Season 2

Web
Year	Title	Role	Notes
2013	Armed Response	Blake Morgan	4 episodes
