= Patrick O'Kane =

Irish actor (born 1965)

Patrick O'Kane is an Irish actor who was born in 1965 in Belfast, Northern Ireland. He has been part of the companies of the Royal National Theatre and the Royal Exchange Theatre, Manchester. He has appeared in London's West End and at the Abbey Theatre in Dublin. In addition to his extensive stage work, O'Kane has appeared in movies and on television in many parts.

He won a Nesta Fellowship in 2005 and has released a book "Actor's Voices" a series of conversations with modern actors (Oberon Press 2012).

He was also in the finale of season 2 of HBO series Game of Thrones, playing the new face of Jaqen H'ghar.

== Early years ==
He attended St Malachy's College, Belfast where he discovered a love of acting and then attended Manchester University, graduating with double honours in Drama and English. This was followed by training at the Central School of Speech and Drama.

== Career overview ==
He has been part of the companies of the Royal National Theatre, where he appeared in The Playboy of the Western World and Peer Gynt, and the Royal Shakespeare Company, where he played the title role in Macbeth. At the Royal Exchange Theatre, Manchester, he gave an "eye-catching", "triumphant" performance in the title role of Christopher Marlowe's Doctor Faustus in 2010.

In London's West End, he has appeared in War Horse. He played John Proctor in the Lyric Theatre, Belfast's production of Arthur Miller's The Crucible, opening the theatre's new performance space in April 2011 to rave reviews and receiving a nomination for best actor in the Irish Theatre Awards for his performance.

In October 2011 O'Kane appeared to great acclaim in the lead role of "16 Possible Glimpses" at the Abbey Theatre in Dublin.

In May 2012, he appeared as J. Bruce Ismay in Owen McCafferty's Titanic (Scenes from the British Wreck Commissioner’s Inquiry, 1912) at the newly opened MAC art's venue in Belfast and will be performing in Owen McCafferty's play "Quietly" in the Abbey Theatre in October 2012.

In addition to his extensive stage work, O'Kane has appeared in movies and on television in many parts including 'Game of Thrones', seasons two and three of 'The Borgias', series nine of the popular BBC "New Tricks" and the upcoming BBC detective series "The Fall" set in Northern Ireland.

=== Doctor Who ===
In 2020, O'Kane had a significant guest role in the twelfth revived series of Doctor Who, appearing in three episodes as Ashad ("the Lone Cyberman"): The Haunting of Villa Diodati, Ascension of the Cybermen and The Timeless Children. This gave him the distinction of being the first actor to play one of the programme's long-running Cybermen opposite Jodie Whittaker's thirteenth incarnation of the Doctor.

O'Kane recalled the Cybermen from his childhood and was "delighted" with the role. He reprised the role of Ashad in Whittaker's final episode, "The Power of the Doctor".

== Work with Owen McCafferty ==
O'Kane has appeared in multiple plays written by Owen McCafferty, including Closing Time at the National Theatre in 2002, Scenes from the Big Picture (playing a character who works in an abattoir rooted in the playwright's own experience) at the National Theatre Cottesloe in 2003, and Shoot the Crow at the Royal Exchange Studio, Manchester in 2003. O'Kane and McCafferty grew up in the same Belfast village and attended the same youth club, though McCafferty was four years older. They both played Gaelic football for the local club. The two did not collaborate as theatrical professionals until McCafferty began writing Closing Time while on secondment at the National Theatre Studio.

In 2013/14 he appeared in Quietly in Edinburgh and moved on to Ireland, Germany and London. This was a 3 people theatre production and he played one of the two people arguing over an incident that had happened years before. He was playing the character Jimmy.

== Selected theatre performances ==
- Donny in Donny Boy by Robert Glendinning (TMA Award for best new play).World premiere directed by Casper Wrede at the Royal Exchange, Manchester (1990)
- Brutus in Julius Caesar. Directed by Robert Delamere at the Royal Exchange, Manchester (1994)
- Geoffrey Jackson in Absurd Person Singular by Alan Ayckbourn. Directed by James Maxwell at the Royal Exchange, Manchester (1994)
- Bernie in Unidentified Human Remains and the True Nature of Love by Brad Fraser. Directed by Braham Murray at the Royal Exchange, Manchester (1995)
- Jean in Miss Julie by August Strindberg. Directed by Braham Murray at the Royal Exchange, Manchester (1995)
- Michael in A Whistle in the Dark by Tom Murphy. Directed by Jacob Murray at the Royal Exchange, Manchester (2006)
- Faustus in Doctor Faustus by Christopher Marlowe. Directed by Toby Trow at the Royal Exchange, Manchester (2010)
- Caravaggio in The Seven Acts of Mercy by Anders Lustgarten. Directed by Erica Whyman at the Royal Shakespeare Company (2017)
- Woyzeck in Woyzeck in Winter adapted and directed by Conall Morrison at the Galway International Arts Festival (2017)

== Filmography ==
=== Film and television ===
Year	Title	Role	Notes
1999	Sunset Heights	Friday Knight	
1999	A Rap at the Door	Cahal Millen	
2000	When the Sky Falls	Tall thin man	
2003	Octane	Trucker	
2003	Stealing Rembrandt	Nigel	
2004	Exorcist: The Beginning	Bession	
2009	Perkins' 14	Dwayne Hopper	
2012	Good Vibrations	Hatchet	
2012	Game of Thrones	Jaqen H'ghar	
2017	Star Wars: The Last Jedi	Captain Tritt Opan	
2018	Female Human Animal	Detective	
2018	National Theatre Live: Macbeth	Macduff	
2020, 2022	Doctor Who	Ashad / Lone Cyberman	4 episodes
2024	The Day of the Jackal	Larry Stoke	4 episodes
2026	Steal	DSU Duff Nichols	3 episodes
TBA	Army of Shadows		Upcoming series

=== Video game ===
Year	Title	Role	Notes
2025	Vampire: The Masquerade – Bloodlines 2	Benny Muldoon (voice)	Also "Loose Cannon" DLC
