= Scream of the Banshee =

- Written by: Anthony C. Ferrante
- Directed by: Steven C. Miller
- Starring: Lauren Holly; Marcelle Baer; Todd Haberkorn; Leanne Cochran; Edrick Browne; Garrett Hines
- Theme music composer: Ryan Dodson
- Country of origin: United States
- Original language: English

Production
- Producers: Anthony C. Ferrante; Courtney Solomon
- Cinematography: Andrew Strahorn
- Editor: Steven C. Miller
- Running time: 90 minutes
- Production company: After Dark Films

Original release
- Network: Syfy
- Release: March 26, 2011

Scream of the Banshee is a 2011 monster movie directed by Steven C. Miller and released as part of the After Dark Originals series. In the words of one of the film's stars, Lance Henriksen, “It’s a re-telling of the screaming banshee myth” and follows an archeology professor who accidentally unleashes a banshee from nearly a century of confinement with deadly consequences.

== Plot ==
Limerick City, Ireland 1188AD: Several templar knights pursue a fleeing figure in a red cloak on horseback through a wooded area. The figure reveals herself to be a banshee and kills several knights with its scream before the last knight decapitates it with his magical cross shaped shield that folds into a cube around the head, severing it and sealing it away.

Present Day (2011): At a university, archeology professor Maura Whelan is working late with several students on an artifact cataloging project when they are sent a mysterious box containing an Irish gauntlet and a hand-drawn map of “section 3”, a storage area rarely used. One of the students, Otto and Whelan's daughter Shayla investigate the map and uncover a small room hidden behind a false wall. Inside is crate with the name “DUNCAN” spray painted on it. Inside the crate is the magic box/shield used to defeat the banshee 800 years earlier. Whelan notices similarities between the designs of the box and gauntlet and uses the armor to open the box, revealing the mummified Banshee head. When Whelan is out of the room on a phone call with the Dean, the head opens its eyes and starts screaming, causing Otto and Janie's ears to bleed and incapacitating everyone within earshot of the scream before the head bursts into flames and disintegrates. Nearby university security officer Pete Sioux's earpiece is damaged from the scream and he attempts to remove it in the bathroom. He's attacked when the banshee, in an old grotesque woman form, rushes from one of the stalls and kills him with her scream.

That night, each person who heard the banshee's scream is haunted by the creature in some way: Whelan, while she is sleeping; Otto, as he plays video games; Janie, while she bathes. The following day at university, they all discuss this and Whelan tells the others she found information on the “Duncan” whose name was on the crate. Together they discover he was Broderick Duncan, esteemed professor at the university who was fired over an assault charge and has since become a disgraced internet “doomsday prophet”. They also discover he once had an assistant, Samuel Page, who might know where he currently lives, so Whelan decides to visit him. The group discovers Officer Sioux's body stashed in section 3 and report it to the police. Afterwards, Otto walks Janie home and Whelan goes to visit Page. Page gives her background on the box and how it was found. He offers to help them find Duncan.

Whelan drives Page, Otto, Shayla, and Shayla's boyfriend Kurtis to Duncan's house when she falls asleep at the wheel and crashes, killing Kurtis. They continue on foot to Duncan's house. When they arrive, he lets the four in but soon begins shooting at them and demanding the box/shield used to kill the banshee. Duncan comes to a standoff with Whelan and Page before agreeing to help them kill the banshee. He shows them a special two pronged sword that will make a banshee vulnerable if they use it on the creature. When the banshee appears in the form of dead Kurtis and attacks Shayla, Whelan stabs it with the sword and they cut the banshee's head off with the magic shield. A mortally wounded Duncan tries to make off with the box, but Shayla stabs him with the sword, killing him. The final scene mimics the end of Raiders of the Lost Ark with the banshee's head being placed in a new crate and stored in a warehouse.

== Cast ==
- Lauren Holly as Professor Isla Whelan
- Marcelle Baer as Shayla Whelan
- Todd Haberkorn as Otto
- Leanna Cochran as Janie
- Lance Henriksen as Broderick Duncan
  - Thomas C. Daniel as Young Broderick Duncan
- Eric F. Adams as Samuel Page
- Garrett Hines as Kurtis
- Edrick Browne as Officer Pete Sioux
- Don Lincoln as Detective
- Misty Ormiston as Old Hag, The Banshee
- Kim Ormiston as Banshee Woman In Red Cape
- Kasey Emas as School Girl

== Production ==
Scream of the Banshee was a unique production for After Dark Films in that it was co-produced with Syfy. This meant that while the film holds an R rating, it still had to be tame enough to air on TV without having to be heavily edited for content. In an interview with BloodyDisgusting.com, director Stephen C. Miller described initially planning a much darker film, however soon realized he "wasn’t going to be able to make the edgy, gore filled Banshee film" he had originally intended. Instead, he chose to draw inspiration from classic horror films like Creature from the Black Lagoon and The Wolf Man, saying these "were scary films for their time but they never went over the top with the killings". He compared the overall tone of this film to that of Fright Night.

Filming began in November 2009 in Louisiana. Actor Lance Henriksen described the plantation style house they used as a filming location in an interview with Collider.com where he also discussed his character in the film.

== Release ==
Scream of the Banshee holds the distinction of being the 200th Syfy Original Movie and had its premier on television on March 26, 2011 as part of the channel's Saturday night line-up.

== Reception ==
Dread Central published a mixed review in 2011. The review notes the odd choice of monster for Syfy's 200th original movie and cites that the slow-moving plot and low body count put this film in a "category of not being good enough or even bad enough to be much fun". The review argues that the film also relies too heavily on hallucinations and dream sequences resulting in not a whole lot actually happening to the characters up until the rushed third act. The reviewer also points out the haphazard use of the star power associated with Lance Henriksen who doesn't actually show up until the film's conclusion and even has his name misspelled in the opening titles. The highlight of the film is the creature design of the banshee, which is done practically in the film and is praised for its creativity and realism. The review awards the film 2/5 "knives" (stars)

HorrorNews.net had more positive things to say of the film in a review from 2016. The review introduces the film by saying "Sure there are plot holes and things you wish they might have done a bit differently but don’t think too terribly hard and you should have fun". It goes on to acknowledge the creature design, particularly the severed banshee head set piece unboxed in the film's first act, although states their desire for more explanation given to the creature's origins.

TheHollywoodNews.com panned the film in a review of the DVD release stating that "there is so much wrong with this film, it’s difficult to know where to begin". The review criticizes the acting, the story, the creature design and notes a lack of scares for a horror movie and ultimately does not recommend it.

== See also ==
- The Statement of Randolph Carter
