= After Dark Horrorfest =

American horror film festival (2006–2015)

- 2010 8 Films to Die For promotional poster
- Opening film: November 17, 2006
- Closing film: October 16, 2015
- Location: United States
- Hosted by: After Dark Films
- Festival date: November 17th, 2006 – October 16th, 2015
- Language: English
- Website: horrorfestonline.com l no longer active redirects to other website link..

After Dark Horrorfest (also known as "8 Films to Die For") was an annual horror film festival featuring eight independent horror movies, sometimes with "secret" bonus films, all distributed by After Dark Films in the USA. The first HorrorFest was held in 2006 and last one was held in 2015.

In 2011, Horrorfest was replaced with After Dark Originals, composed of original films from After Dark and not previously acquired ones.

== HorrorFest 2006 ==
HorrorFest 2006: 8 Films to Die For
- 2006 8 Films to Die For promotional poster

After Dark's HorrorFest for 2006 was scheduled for November 17 through November 21, 2006.

=== Films ===
The films shown during the course of the festival were:

The Abandoned
A film producer, who was adopted as a baby and sent to America, returns to her native Russia and the family farm. Once there, strange things begin to happen. After completion of the festival, this film was re-released to general theatres on February 23, 2007.
Dark Ride
Ten years after he brutally murdered two girls, a killer escapes from a mental institution and returns to his turf, the theme park attraction called "Dark Ride" where he targets a group of six college kids on their way to Spring Break.
The Gravedancers
A group of friends' lives are invaded by a trio of hostile ghosts after they engage in a drunken bout of grave-dancing during a wake for an old chum.
The Hamiltons
A picture-perfect American family, making up of four very different siblings trying to get by after the recent death of their parents, is always kind, loving and respectful to their neighbors... except that they usually wind up killing them.
Penny Dreadful
A young girl who has car-phobia goes on a special road trip through the mountains to cure her fear, guided by her therapist. This trip turns deadly as an escaped mental patient starts a new spree of killings and traps the girl in the car.
Reincarnation
A Japanese film crew recreates a gruesome mass murder at a rural hotel only to find themselves suffer fates they are acting out in the film.
Unrest
A med student collapses upon sensing a "presence" about her cadaver. Her fears are strengthened by the mysterious death of a friend. She must discover the connection before an angry spirit can wreak further vengeance.
Wicked Little Things
Recently widowed Karen Tunny and her two daughters, Sarah and Emma, move to a remote mountain home in Pennsylvania which Karen has inherited from the family of her late husband. However, she is unaware that the home is situated near an old coal mine, the site of an early 20th-century tragedy in which many children miners were buried alive... and have now become zombies out to avenge their deaths.

=== Pre-HorrorFest 2006 Celebration ===
On Thursday, November 16, 2006, Dark Delicacies, a horror-themed bookstore in Burbank, CA hosted a signing event with about 30 filmmakers and talents from the movies.

=== Miss HorrorFest 2006 ===
A contest for the 'official spokeswoman' of the film series and for After Dark Films, was announced September 2006 on YouTube. Participants auditioned both online and in person at Los Angeles and New York locations, and were later flown to those cities to appear at the Fuse/Fangoria Chainsaw Awards, the Fangoria Radio Show with Dee Snider and Debbie Rochon, PlayMania and a short series of reality-style movies featured on YouTube. The four finalists were chieko13, msblackbetty, darkspidernyc, and Ysabella Brave. Internet voting ended on November 9, 2006. Msblackbetty was named Miss HorrorFest 2006 on November 18, 2006.

=== HorrorFest 2006 DVD releases ===
7 of the original list of 8 films from the 2006 festival were released on DVD on March 27, 2007. The Abandoned was released on June 19, 2007, the delay having been caused by the theatrical re-release. Of the bonus films, Snoop Dogg's Hood of Horror was released on September 11, 2007, and The Tripper was released by Fox Video on October 23, 2007.

== HorrorFest II 2007 ==
HorrorFest 2007: 8 More Films to Die For
- 2007 8 Films to Die For promotional poster

After Dark's HorrorFest for 2007 was scheduled for November 9 through November 18, 2007.

=== Films ===
The eight films shown during the course of the festival were:

Borderland
Phil and his two college buddies road-trip down to a Mexican border town to celebrate their high school graduation. While there, they run into a cult looking for human sacrifice and their weekend becomes a bloody test of survival.

Crazy Eights
After a mutual childhood friend dies, six friends reunite for the funeral. While there, they find a map to unearth a time capsule in an abandoned hospital. They go on a hunt for this time capsule, but discover something else as well: the remains of a dead child.
The Deaths of Ian Stone
Ian Stone is a young Englishman who finds himself trapped in a constant cycle of dying violently every night, only to wake up with a different life.
Lake Dead
A group of teenagers inherit a motel on a lake, only to uncover a series of dark and frightening family secrets.
Mulberry Street
A deadly pandemic breaks out in New York City and six evicted people find themselves trapped in their tenement building having to fight off growing numbers of zombie-like people infected by rat bites who turn into "were-rats".
Nightmare Man
After receiving an African fertility mask as a gift from her husband, Ellen Morris is attacked by a mysterious being she dubs "The Nightmare Man". She takes refuge in a lakeside house where she accidentally puts the four people there in immediate danger.
Tooth and Nail
A group of people in a post-apocalyptic world of what was once the city of Philadelphia have to fight to survive against a band of vicious cannibals.
Unearthed
A creature accidentally unearthed during an archaeological dig in a New Mexico town terrorizes the people of the town.
Frontier(s)
A group of crooks attempt to take advantage of the riots ensuing a conservative regime taking control of France, only to run afoul of a family of neo-Nazi cannibals who reside in a remote villa on the French–German border. Frontier(s) was slated to be one of the films shown at Horrorfest 2007, but after the MPAA gave the film an NC-17 rating, it was decided that it would instead be released to theatres separately in May 2008. The DVD was released with the same Horrorfest packaging as the other films.

=== Miss HorrorFest 2007 ===
Mistress Malice (aka Melissa Jones) was chosen as Miss HorrorFest 2007. In 2008, she joined the cast of Butterfly Effect: Revelation, which was shown as part of Horrorfest III.

=== HorrorFest 2007 DVD releases ===
DVDs of all eight films were released March 18, 2008.

== HorrorFest III (2008) ==
After Dark Horrorfest III
- 2008 8 Films to Die For promotional poster

After Dark's HorrorFest for 2008 was scheduled for January 9 through January 15, 2009.

=== Films ===
The eight films shown during the course of the festival were:

Autopsy
A young woman attempts to find her injured boyfriend in a bizarre hospital located in the middle of nowhere.
The Broken
A young Englishwoman is surprised to see what looks like herself, drive by one day. She follows the woman, which sets off a chain of events which leads her into a haunting, nightmare reality.
The Butterfly Effect 3: Revelations
A young man with the power of time-travel attempts to solve the mystery of his girlfriend's death. In doing this, however, he frees a vindictive serial killer.
Dying Breed
Australian zoology student Nina and her four friends go into the Tasmanian Forest in search of the extinct Tasmanian Tiger. What they discover, however, is a cannibalistic clan who are the descendants of a famous escaped serial killer known as The Pieman.
From Within
The residents of a small town in Maryland begin to die off, supposedly of suicides.
Perkins' 14
Ronald Perkins brainwashes 14 people, in order to create an army that will defend him from his parents' killers.
Slaughter
A young woman meets a girl at a bar and returns to her family farm in rural Georgia in the hope of escaping an abusive situation. Unfortunately, this safe place ends up being much more abusive than her previous one.
Voices
Overnight, brutal murders become everyday occurrences as friends turn on friends, brothers turn on sisters, and husbands turn on wives. Originally released in South Korea as 'Du saram yi-da' ("Two people"), based on the best selling Korean comic book series of the same name. Also known as 'Someone Behind You'.

After Dark Films produced and distributed both Slaughter and Perkins' 14, making these the first films that the company has produced and then released as part of the 8 Films to Die For.

=== Miss HorrorFest 2008 ===
The auditions for Miss Horrorfest 2008 were open from September 15 to October 17. There were online auditions via YouTube, as well as on-site auditions on October 6, 2008 in Sherman Oaks California. On October 31, the 8 semifinalists were announced: X-Actra, Princess Agoniya, Shelly Martinez, Saffron Sinclaire, Dracula's Girls, Demon, Vic Tim, and Bella Vamp. Three weeks later, the 4 finalists were picked: Demon, Princess Agoniya, Vic Tim, and Saffron Sinclaire. On December 13, Vic Tim (aka Kelly Marchand) was announced as the third Miss Horrorfest.

=== HorrorFest III DVD releases ===
The DVDs were released March 31, 2009.

== HorrorFest 4 (2010) ==
After Dark Horrorfest IV
- 2010 8 Films to Die For promotional poster

After Dark's HorrorFest for 2010 was scheduled for January 29 through February 4, 2010.

=== Films ===
The eight films shown during the course of the festival were:

Dread
Dread, the eighth film adapted from Clive Barker's Books of Blood series, is a stylish horror/thriller about three New England college students working on a documentary for school focusing on what others dread in life... and one of them is a psychopath who takes his work a little too seriously.
The Final
After receiving a lake-house granted to him in his uncle’s will, a high school outcast named Dane, and his friends, Jack, Ravi, Andy, and Emily prepare for a single night to abduct their bullying classmates, and leave their tormentors scarred for life... both physically and emotionally.
The Graves
On their last weekend together, two teenage girls get lost in a remote part of the Arizona desert where they are lured to Skull City Mine, an abandoned silver mine town. But they soon learn Skull City is anything but abandoned, and there’s no way out.
Hidden
A man unwillingly returns to the small Norwegian town he ran away from 19 years ago. His cruel mother has recently died, and left him the house he grew up in and he soon is entangled up in a series of events that seem beyond anyone’s control...
Kill Theory
Are you capable of the unthinkable? That’s the question seven college students face when they visit a secluded vacation home in Louisiana to celebrate graduation and are put to a horrific test by a mysterious killer who forces them to kill one another in order to survive the night.
Lake Mungo
A "mockumentary" featuring interviews detailing how a 16-year-old Australian girl drowned while swimming in a local lake. With a verdict of accidental death, her grieving family buries her. A series of clues and a haunting by the teen girl's spirit force her parents to learn more about her life when her secret past emerges.
The Reeds
A weekend boating trip through the English Norfolk Broads becomes a terrifying, deadly ordeal for six 20-something year old friends when their boat gets damaged and they are menaced by unseen forces lurking in the reeds.
ZMD: Zombies of Mass Destruction
A conservative island community is under attack! The small town of Port Gamble in Washington state is being overrun with brain/flesh-eating zombies, and a rag tag band of rebels try to turn the tide and push the invading hordes of undead back.

=== HorrorFest IV DVD releases ===
Horrorfest IV DVDs were released on March 23, 2010 and went out to retailers March 12, 2010.

== 8 Films to Die For 2015 ==
8 Films to Die For 2015

After Dark Films' 8 Films to Die For debuted on October 16, 2015.

=== Films ===
The eight films showing during this festival were:

Re-Kill
It's been 5 years since the outbreak that wiped out 85% of the world's population, but the war between Re-Animates (Re-Ans) and Humans wages on, as most of the major cities are still uninhabitable. Within the few surviving cities, the Re-Ans have been segregated into "zones" and are policed by the R-Division of the QUASI S.W.A.T. Unit who hunt to re-kill the Re-Ans in the hope of quelling a second outbreak.

Murder in the Dark
When a group of young people camping in the ruins of a medieval Turkish town play a party game called ‘Murder in the Dark’, they soon discover that someone is taking the game too far… Produced in an experimental shooting style, this murder-mystery features a cast of actors who were not allowed to see the script. The actors’ choices interactively changed the shape of the story. They had to use clues to solve the mystery laid out before them by the filmmakers.

The Wicked Within
When a little girl dies, her family gathers to mourn the loss. Yet, the pain is not forgotten and a vengeful demon spirit takes possession of a vulnerable family member, tearing at the ties that bind them all together. One by one, it forces each family member to confess to his or her buried lies and face the morbid consequences of their sins.

Lumberjack Man
As the staff of Good Friends Church Camp prepares for a spring break filled with “Fun Under the Son”, a demon logger rises from his sap boiler to wreak his vengeance and feast on flapjacks soaked in the blood of his victims.

Suspension
Emily is a high-school student with a penchant for drawing gruesome pictures in her sketchbook. There’s a reason for her obsession with horrific images: Her father Tom once went on a murder spree and is now residing in a mental hospital. On a night she’s home alone babysitting her mute little brother, Tom escapes and targets Emily and her friends during a bloody killing rampage.

Unnatural
A morally ambiguous corporation experiments with genetic modification resulting in the creation of a man hunting creature. When it escapes, a group of unsuspecting cabin dwellers become its prey in a horrifying game of cat and mouse.

Bastard
Five strangers - newlywed serial killers, a suicidal cop, and two runaways - become suspect and victim when a masked murderer makes its presence known in an isolated mountain town.

Wind Walkers
A U.S. soldier returns from captivity to find that his friend and fellow former POW has gone AWOL. While out on an annual hunting trip with his friend’s father and some extended family his group comes under attack by an ancient Native American curse that has mysterious connections to his friend's Native heritage and the prison in which they were held.
