= Next Action Star =

American reality television series

- Genre: Reality
- Directed by: Omid Kahangi; Glenn GT Taylor
- Presented by: Tina Malave
- Judges: Scot Boland; Victoria Burrows; Marki Costello
- Composers: Dan Radlauer; Adam Zelkind
- Country of origin: United States
- Original language: English
- No. of seasons: 1
- No. of episodes: 10

Production
- Executive producers: Cris Abrego; Gary R. Benz; Joel Silver; Rick Telles
- Producers: Fernando Mills; Alan Schechter
- Camera setup: Multi-camera
- Running time: 24 mins.
- Production companies: Silver Pictures Television; Brass Ring Entertainment; Warner Bros. Television; NBC Studios; GRB Entertainment

Original release
- Network: NBC
- Release: June 14 – July 28, 2004

Next Action Star is an American reality television program shown on NBC from June 14 to July 28, 2004.

== Synopsis ==
The series featured 14 finalists (7 women and 7 men) vying for 2 spots as the Next Action Star in their own feature film. Each week, the contestants participated in screen tests that determined who got a callback and who goes home. The two winners starred in their own made-for-TV movie, the Louis Morneau-directed Bet Your Life which was aired on NBC on August 4, 2004.

== Contestants ==
The 14 contestants were:

=== Female ===
- Corinne Van Ryck de Groot (winner)
- Jeanne Bauer (runner up)
- Melisande Amos (third place)
- Mae Moreno (fourth place)
- Linda Borini (fifth place)
- Somere Sanders (sixth place)
- Viviana Londono (seventh place)

=== Male ===
- Sean Carrigan (winner)
- Jared Elliott (second place)
- John Keyser (third place)
- Mark Nilsson (fourth place)
- Harold "House" Moore (fifth place)
- Greg Cirulnick (sixth place)
- Santino Sloan (seventh place)

== Production ==
The episodes of the show are filmed in U.S. cities such as Atlanta, Georgia, Dallas, Texas, Miami, Florida, Minneapolis, Minnesota, Los Angeles, California and New York City.

== Episode status ==
Reruns of the show was aired on the Game Show Network (GSN) in 2004.

As of 2024, the show is made available for streaming online on FilmRise (who acquired the digital distribution rights to some shows from GRB Studios in 2023) and its partners, the Fox Corporation-owned AVOD service Tubi, The Roku Channel, Fawesome and Amazon Prime Video .
