= El Gringo =

2012 film by Eduardo Rodríguez

- Theatrical release poster
- Directed by: Eduardo Rodríguez
- Written by: Jonathan Stokes
- Produced by: Courtney Solomon; Moshe Diamant
- Starring: Scott Adkins; Yvette Yates; Christian Slater; Israel Islas; Erando Gonzalez; Sofia Sisniega; Valentin Ganev
- Cinematography: Yaron Levy
- Edited by: Don Adams; Harold Parker; Eduardo Rodriguez
- Music by: Luis Ascanio
- Production companies: After Dark Films; Silver Pictures; IM Global
- Distributed by: After Dark Films; G2 Pictures; Tanweer Films
- Release date: May 11, 2012
- Running time: 102 minutes
- Country: United States
- Languages: English; Spanish
- Budget: $7 million

El Gringo (Translation: Bad Yankee) is a 2012 American action film directed by Eduardo Rodríguez, produced by After Dark Films, written by Jonathan Stokes, and starring Scott Adkins, Christian Slater and Yvette Yates.

== Plot ==
Following an ambush in which he is wounded, and his undercover DEA partners are killed, The Man escapes into Mexico with a case holding two million dollars, and arrives in the dusty town of El Fronteras. He faces danger from the local sheriff and his thugs, a local drug cartel, his checkered past and his former DEA boss.

== Partial cast ==
- Scott Adkins as The Man
- Christian Slater as Lieutenant West
- Peter Bachvarov as "Tortuga"
- Zahari Baharov as Officer Bell
- Minoza Bazova as Female Bus Station Attendant
- Michail Elenov as Pablo
- Yvette Yates as Anna
- Israel Islas as "Culebra"
- Erando González as Chief Espinoza
- Sofía Sisniega as "Flaca"
- Valentin Ganev as Deputy Chief Logan
- Krasimir Rankov as Restaurante Owner
- Velislav Pavlov as Officer Dunn
- Bashar Rahal as Officer Sullivan
- Edward Joe Scargill as Officer Conner
- Atanas Srebrev as Rick
- Marii Rosen as "Naco"
- George Karkulovski as "El Jefe"
- Vlado Mihailov as "Chilango"
- Yoanna Temelkova as Shop Keeper

== Production ==
The screenplay by Jonathan Stokes was purchased by After Dark Films in 2011 for Joel Silver to executive produce.

The film was shot in Bulgaria and Louisiana at an estimated cost of US$7 million.

== Release ==
The film was released in the United States to theatres on May 11, 2012, with an MPAA "R" rating. As part of the "After Dark Action" bundle, the film showed for one week in ten cities, and was simultaneously released for video on demand.

== Reception ==
The film received mildly warm reviews. Variety described it as "an undeniable exercise in third-hand coolness, with nods to spaghetti Westerns and '70s drive-in actioners, El Gringo is diverting enough", continuing, "willfully over-the-top action and character types are fun if never quite as giddily distinctive as hoped for." The Los Angeles Times summarized, "not bad exactly, but it's not especially notable either." IndieWire noted that the film's "colorful character[s] [...] don't really get much to do to emphasize their identities amidst the action", adding, "El Gringo gets bogged down in overly-plotty nonsense, but the fight choreography and shootouts are fast-paced and inventive, allowing the film to come alive in spite of its time-wasting peripherals", giving the film a "B−".
