= The Philly Kid =

Philly Kid
- Theatrical release poster
- Directed by: Jason Connery
- Written by: Adam Mervis
- Produced by: Moshe Diamant; Stephanie Caleb; Karri O'Reilly; Lauren Ito; Jeff SilverExecutive Producer: Courtney Solomon, et al.
- Starring: Wes Chatham; Devon Sawa; Sarah Butler; Chris Browning; Lucky Johnson; Neal McDonough; Michael Jai White
- Cinematography: Marco Fargnoli
- Edited by: William Yeh; Andrew Bentler
- Music by: Ian Honeyman
- Production companies: After Dark Films; Signature Entertainment
- Distributed by: After Dark Films; IM Global
- Release date: May 11, 2012
- Running time: 94 minutes
- Country: United States
- Language: English
- Budget: $4.9 million

Philly Kid is a 2012 American drama film directed by Jason Connery and written by Adam Mervis. The film stars Wes Chatham, Devon Sawa, Chris Browning, Lucky Johnson, Kristopher Van Varenburg, Michael Jai White, and Neal McDonough.

== Plot ==
Following ten years in a Louisiana prison after being wrongly convicted of assault and murder of a police officer, NCAA champion wrestler Dillon is paroled. Back in his home neighborhood in Baton Rouge, Louisiana, his friend Jake is in deep trouble with gamblers, and Dillon agrees to pay off his debt by cage fighting. Complications occur with Dillon's parole officer, a corrupt cop, Dillon's new girlfriend, and fight promoters. His problems compound with his victories; eventually the system demands that he throw a bout.

== Cast ==
- Wes Chatham as Dillon "The Philly Kid" McGuire, a former high school wrestler turned MMA fighter
- Devon Sawa as Jake
- Sarah Butler as Amy
- Neal McDonough as Jim "L.A. Jim" Jacoby
- Lucky Johnson as "Ace" Reed
- Chris Browning as Detective Ray Marks
- Michael Jai White as Arthur Letts
- Bernard Hocke as Lenny
- Rich Clementi as Sanchez
- Shawn Jordan as Andrei Titov
- Kristopher Van Varenberg as Chase

== Production ==
The film was shot in Baton Rouge, Louisiana beginning in May 2011. The film's production staff included about ten department heads with ties to the Wright State University film program or Dayton, Ohio.

== Release ==
The film was released in the United States to theatres on May 11, 2012, with an MPAA "R" rating. As part of the "After Dark Action" bundle, the film showed for one week in ten cities, and was simultaneously released for video on demand.

== Reception ==
The Philly Kid received mixed reviews. Variety wrote that it "delivers the basic goods, if not much more, as formulaic, functional guys'-night-in entertainment", continuing that the performances and "... Jason Connery's direction are solid enough, but the pic lacks the distinctive elements that might have lifted it above routine competence." The Los Angeles Times summarized that the film "attempts to locate a drama within the world of mixed martial arts fighting, when all it really wants to do is show some fights." IndieWire noted that the film's "combat sequences are vivid and believable. Too bad about everything else", adding, "The Philly Kid never gains traction as a film about anything other than what it's about—you've seen it before you've seen it", giving the film a "C−".

The film score by Ian Honeyman was well received: it "doesn’t feel like a factory-produced piece of Hollywood, but rather a score with soul and heart", according to SoundtrackGeek.com, which gave an overall grade of 81/100.
