= 51 (film) =

- Theatrical release poster
- Directed by: Jason Connery
- Written by: Kenny Yakkel
- Produced by: Courtney Solomon
- Starring: Bruce Boxleitner; Rachel Miner; Vanessa Branch; Jason London and John Shea
- Cinematography: Yaron Levy
- Edited by: Andrew Bentler
- Music by: Ian Honeyman
- Production company: After Dark Films
- Distributed by: Syfy
- Release date: February 26, 2011
- Running time: 90 min.
- Country: United States
- Language: English
- Budget: $1 million

51 (also known as After Dark Originals: Area 51 or Area 51) is a 2011 American horror film directed by Jason Connery and starring Bruce Boxleitner and John Shea. It is part of the After Dark Originals lineup. The film premiered on the SyFy Channel on February 26, 2011.

== Plot ==
Political and public pressure coerces the government into allowing two well-known reporters and their assistants limited access to the ultra-secretive Area 51. The group consists of 20-year news veteran Sam Whitaker (John Shea); his camera-woman Mindy (Lena Clark); Claire Felon (Vanessa Branch), an ambitious writer, journalist, and head of an acclaimed news blog called The Fact Zone; and her cameraman Kevin (Damon Lipari). The four tour the base and things go well for a while, but when one of the base's "occupants" attempts to liberate both himself and those of his fellow species, Area 51 changes from being a secured government facility to a place of horror.

== Cast ==
- Vanessa Branch as Claire Felon
- Bruce Boxleitner as Colonel Martin
- Rachel Miner as Sergeant Hannah
- Jason London as Aaron Schumacher
- John Shea as Sam Whitaker
- Andrew Sensenig as Dr. Keane
- Billy Slaughter as Dr. Haven
- Jillian Batherson as Gomez
- Lena Clark as Mindy
- Damon Lipari as Kevin
- VyVy Nguyen as Elisia

== Reception ==
Dread Central gave 51 a mixed review, stating that they would "write this one off as being a bit better than average by Syfy standards but still below par by conventional standards".
