= Dark Circles =

- Directed by: Paul Soter
- Written by: Paul Soter
- Produced by: Alan Amiel; Bobby Ranghelov; Courtney Solomon
- Starring: Johnathon Schaech; Pell James
- Cinematography: Brown Cooper; Yaron Levy
- Edited by: William Leh
- Music by: Bobby Tahouri
- Production company: After Dark Films
- Distributed by: After Dark Films (theatrical); Lionsgate (USA, DVD)
- Release date: May 21, 2013
- Running time: 87 minutes
- Country: United States
- Language: English

Dark Circles is a 2013 psychological horror film starring Johnathon Schaech and Pell James.

== Synopsis ==
Alex (Johnathon Schaech) and Penny (Pell James) have decided to uproot themselves from their hectic city lives and move out to the country, believing that it will be better for their baby. The move is not without hesitation, as Penny is concerned that she will not be a fit mother for her baby while Alex can't help but wonder if it would have been better to remain in the city with his bandmates. Soon after they move, strange things begin to occur that cause them to wonder if the move was really the best idea.

== Cast ==
- Johnathon Schaech as Alex
- Pell James as Penny
- Philippe Brenninkmeyer as Michael
- Jennifer Foreman as Nancy
- Andrea Frankle as Johanna

== Reception ==
Critical reception has been mixed. Shock Till You Drop gave a mostly favorable review, writing that it was "a fun, creepy movie that depicts problems that every couple faces with new parenthood, just with a little paranormal activity thrown in the mix." DVD Talk and Dread Central both gave mixed reviews, praising the film while also stating that it did have some issues.
