= After Dark Films =

Independent film production and distribution company

- Type: Privately held company
- Industry: Film industry
- Founded: 2006; 20 years ago
- Founder: Courtney Solomon; Allan Zeman
- Headquarters: Los Angeles, California, United States
- Key people: Courtney Solomon (CEO/Partner)
- Products: Motion pictures

After Dark Films was an American independent film production and distribution company founded by Courtney Solomon and Allan Zeman in 2006.

== History ==
The company is the organizer for the annual independent horror film festival After Dark Horrorfest, also known as 8 Films to Die For. In 2006, After Dark Films entered a three-year agreement with Lions Gate. Under the agreement, Lions Gate planned to release An American Haunting on DVD, while After Dark planned a collection of horror films for 500 U.S. theaters that November. On March 30, 2010 the company founded After Dark Originals alongside Lionsgate and Syfy. On March 2, 2012, After Dark Films announced After Dark Action, an action film series. The series included five feature films with an international cast going to video-on-demand starting on May 11th 2012.

== Filmography ==
=== After Dark Horrorfest ===
| Title | Release date | Refs |
|---|---|---|
| The Abandoned | 2006 | |
| Dark Ride | 2006 | |
| The Gravedancers | 2006 | |
| The Hamiltons | 2006 | |
| Penny Dreadful | 2006 | |
| Reincarnation | 2006 | |
| Snoop Dogg's Hood of Horror | 2006 | |
| Unrest | 2006 | |
| Wicked Little Things | 2006 | |
| Borderland | 2007 | |
| Crazy Eights | 2007 | |
| The Deaths of Ian Stone | 2007 | |
| Lake Dead | 2007 | |
| Mulberry Street | 2007 | |
| Nightmare Man | 2007 | |
| Tooth & Nail | 2007 | |
| Unearthed | 2007 | |
| Frontier(s) | 2007 | |
| Autopsy | 2008 | |
| The Broken | 2009 | |
| The Butterfly Effect 3: Revelations | 2009 | |
| Dying Breed | 2009 | |
| From Within | 2009 | |
| Perkins' 14 | 2009 | |
| Slaughter | 2009 | |
| Voices | 2009 | |
| Dread | 2011 | |
| The Final | 2011 | |
| The Graves | 2011 | |
| Hidden | 2011 | |
| Kill Theory | 2011 | |
| Lake Mungo | 2011 | |
| The Reeds | 2011 | |
| ZMD: Zombies of Mass Destruction | 2011 | |
| Murder in the Dark | 2015 | |
| Wind Walkers | 2015 | |
| Suspension | 2015 | |
| Unnatural | 2015 | |
| The Wicked Within | 2015 | |
| Re-Kill | 2015 | |
| Lumberjack Man | 2015 | |
| Bastard | 2015 | |

=== After Dark Originals ===
| Title | Release date |
|---|---|
| Fertile Ground | 2011 |
| 51 | 2011 |
| Husk | 2011 |
| Prowl | 2011 |
| Seconds Apart | 2011 |
| Scream of the Banshee | 2011 |
| The Task | 2011 |
| Red Clover | 2012 |
| Children of Sorrow | 2012 |
| Dark Circles | 2013 |
| Sanatorium | 2013 |
| Ritual | 2013 |
| Mischief Night | 2014 |
| Bedlam | 2015 |
| Asylum | 2015 |
| House Keeping | 2015 |

=== After Dark Action ===
| Title | Release date |
|---|---|
| Dragon Eyes | 2012 |
| El Gringo | 2012 |
| Philly Kid | 2012 |
| Stash House | 2012 |
| Transit | 2012 |
| Getaway | 2013 |
| Enemies Closer | 2014 |

=== Other produced films ===
| Title | Release date | Ref |
|---|---|---|
| Fierce People | 2005 | |
| An American Haunting | 2006 | |
| Wristcutters: A Love Story | 2006 | |
| Skinwalkers | 2007 | |
| Captivity | 2007 | |
| Echelon Conspiracy | 2009 | |
| Beyond a Reasonable Doubt | 2009 | |
| Bullet to the Head | 2013 | |
