= Dragon Eyes =

2012 film by John Hyams

- Official film poster
- Directed by: John Hyams
- Written by: Tim Tori
- Produced by: Moshe Diamant
- Starring: Cung Le; Jean-Claude Van Damme
- Cinematography: Stephen Schlueter
- Edited by: Andrew Bentler; Andrew Drazek; Jon Greenhalgh
- Music by: Michael Krassner
- Production company: After Dark Films
- Distributed by: After Dark Films
- Release date: April 9, 2012
- Running time: 91 minutes
- Country: United States
- Language: English
- Budget: $4.8 million

Dragon Eyes is a 2012 American martial arts film starring Cung Le and Jean-Claude Van Damme. It was directed by John Hyams. In New Orleans, a mysterious man looks to unite two warring gangs against the lawmen who have been using them to advance their corrupt agenda. The film was the second collaboration between Van Damme and Hyams, after Universal Soldier: Regeneration (2009).

== Plot ==
St. Jude Square is a neighborhood living in fear and despair. The dueling gangs of local kingpins, Dash and Antoine, terrorize the streets, and the citizens live without a shred of hope until mysterious stranger Ryan Hong arrives. He begins to play one gang against the other, by calling on the teachings of his mentor, Tiano, to find the strength to battle back. However, just as he begins to bring the community under control, Hong is confronted by Victor "Mr. V" Swan, the town's corrupt police chief. At first Mr. V is impressed by Hong's skill, but soon sees Hong as a threat to his regime and the two are locked in a head to head battle, pitting the fear and corruption of Mr. V's regime against the new beginning Hong represents for the people of St. Jude Square.

== Cast ==
- Cung Le as Ryan Hong
- Jean-Claude van Damme as Jean-Louis Tiano
- Peter Weller as Chief Victor "Mr. V" Swan
- Crystal Mantecón as Rosanna
- Danny Mora as Grandpa George
- Kris van Varenberg as Sergeant Feldman
- Luis da Silva as "Dash"
- Dan Henderson as Officer Filnari, Beating Police Officer
- Rich Clementi as Devil Dog Gangster #4
- Trevor Prangley as "Lord"

== Home media ==
On 9 April 2012, DVD and Blu-ray disc was released by G2 Pictures in the United Kingdom in Region 2. A limited number of the DVD slipcovers in Australia were for sale from sanity.com.au and autographed by Jean-Claude Van Damme.
