= Stash House =

- Theatrical release poster
- Directed by: Eduardo Rodríguez
- Screenplay by: Gary Spinelli
- Story by: Gary Spinelli
- Produced by: Moshe Diamant
- Starring: Sean Faris; Briana Evigan; Dolph Lundgren; Jon Huertas
- Music by: Luis Ascanio
- Production company: After Dark Films
- Distributed by: After Dark Films
- Release date: May 11, 2012
- Running time: 99 minutes
- Country: United States
- Language: English
- Budget: $5 million

Stash House is a 2012 American action thriller film directed by Eduardo Rodríguez and starring Sean Faris, Briana Evigan, Dolph Lundgren, and Jon Huertas. The film is part of the After Dark Action films.

== Plot ==
The film begins with a man going into a church. He enters the confessional booth where he tells the priest he would like to make a donation to the church, but before the father can accept, the man shoots himself in the head.

The film then turns to Amy Nash (Evigan) and her husband, David (Faris). It is Amy's birthday, and David buys her a house. Amy, who seems to hate the house, quickly turns to an upset David and tells him she loves it. A happy David shows his wife the security cameras, that watch over 360 degrees of their premises. Amy's friend, Trish (Alyshia Ochse) stops by and congratulates them for being homeowners. She then gives Amy a gift, and quickly leaves for a date with her boyfriend. After Trish leaves, an officer stops by, and identifies himself as Ray (Huertas) and welcomes the couple to the neighborhood before leaving. Amy and David are celebrating when they hear a noise coming from a stove that is somehow in their room. They dismiss the noise as being rats, and continue their celebration.

They proceed to make out in their bedroom, and Amy scratches herself on the wall and goes to the restroom to freshen up. David inspects the wall and finds it to be loose. He takes the walls off and finds heroin stashed in them. Amy comes back, and David quickly lets her know about the situation, and they decide to leave. As they are about to take off, they run into Ray, and tell him about the house. Ray laughs, and reveals to them, that he bet $20 with his buddy that they would not find the stash, before pointing a gun at them. David quickly hits his car, which makes their bikes fall on Ray. The couple quickly takes refuge in the house, as Ray begins to terrorize them. He enters through the back door, and shoots David. As he is about to shoot Amy, she falls on a switch that puts the house on lockdown. Amy then quickly goes to David's aid.

Meanwhile, outside, Ray's buddy, Andy Spector (Lundgren) gets to the house, and argues with Ray, for now they must keep the couple alive. As the couple watches the men, David decides to put the stash in trash bags, and give it to them. Amy agrees, and they give it to the men, who throw it on the trash, stating they "do not want that poison". David then comforts a hysterical Amy and shows her that the whole house is designed for drug dealers. The house has bulletproof windows, and is made of metal under the walls.

The criminals begin to circle the house, and set up a booby trap. Amy decides to make a run for it, while David distracts the criminals in the front, but David makes a run for it, not wanting Amy to get hurt. Amy looks through the cameras, but before David can make it to the fence, he trips over a rope Spector put. Ray hears David fall in the pool and goes after him. Amy quickly gets in Ray's way, and begins to shoot at her. Ray then immediately puts his attention on David, who has now exited the pool. Amy goes back in the house, and finds Spector inside, who attacks her. Amy grabs a spray for animals, and sprays it on Spector's face, before hitting him with it, and quickly puts the house on lockdown. Spector threatens to kills David if Amy does not open the door. Ray shoots David in the hand, and finds David to be in the outhouse. He shoots through the door, thinking its David, but finds out he only shot a raccoon. David, who was in the other side of the house, runs off. Amy, who thinks David was shot, begins to mourn her husband, as she thinks it is her fault David was killed. David attracts Ray into a line of gas, before setting fire to Ray's leg. David then goes to Amy, who lets him in, and covers him in hugs and kisses.

Later that night, the couple begins to hear something in the roof, and find Ray has climbed to the roof, and is trying to break into the chimney. David tries to close the chimney, but before he can, Ray drops a grenade that gets stuck on the door. The couple runs for cover, but the grenade still affects the couple's ears. Amy, who has become affected by the loud blow, sits and mumbles random things, while David finds and shoots a flare gun at Ray, who gets burned on his neck, and falls from the roof. An angry Ray then begins to shoot at them, and threatens to kill them, before leaving. The couple then sits down, and Amy confesses to David that they never should have left Ohio. David begins to look around the house to find possibilities of what the criminals might want. Amy finds a switch, and it opens to a hidden room. They begin to hear noise, and go to the stove in their room, where they find a hidden basement, and find a man, who is unconscious.

Meanwhile, Spector and Ray find a tunnel that heads into the house. Spector decides to distract the couple, while Ray goes through the tunnel. Spector begins to try to trick the couple into letting him in. He reveals to Amy that David knew the last owner was known as a drug lord who committed suicide in a church (revealed to be the man from the beginning of the movie). The couple then hears Ray climbing through the floor, and they hold him down. Amy also gets Trish's birthday present, and stabs Ray's hand with it. An angry Ray begins to shoot through the floor, which causes the couple to hide in the hidden room. Ray lets Spector in, and they begin to saw through the floor, looking for the man. Dave looks through a peephole, and finds the shotgun all alone, and decides to go for it. As he approaches the shotgun slowly, the man wakes up, and begins to freak out, but Amy calms him down before Spector and Ray hear them. David reaches the shotgun; at the same time that Ray and Spector find the man is gone. A police officer then knocks on the door, and asks Ray, who says he lives in the house, if he knows anything about the flare gun. As Ray is about to answer, David points the shotgun at Spector, and makes the officer think David is an intruder, as the two argue, Ray kills the officer, and then attacks David. Ray is about to kill David, but instead, Spector kills Ray.

A few seconds after, Trish enters the house, telling David she and her boyfriend broke up. She quickly realizes what is going on, but is killed before she can react. Spector then forces David to open the hidden room, but finds it empty. Amy then shoots Spector with the shotgun, and they close the door, leaving Spector inside. While Amy calls the police, David finds the front door with a bomb, which he does not know how to disarm, and then finds the switch, that can unlock the house, has been broken. They remember the tunnel, and try to open it, for Spector jammed the lock.

Meanwhile, Spector, who was wearing a bulletproof vest, blows up the wall, and goes after the trio. The old man tries to run, but is shot in the process. The couple is unable to open the tunnel, and as Spector is about to kill them, they hear the police, and Spector makes a new plan. He tells David that he will pretend to be Amy's father, while David hides, for he is the criminal. He tells David that if he is caught before Spector can flee the country, he will kill Amy.

David hides, and Spector pretends to be Amy's father. The police buy it, but suspect something, when Amy seems to be hiding something. The two then see paramedics taking the old man, who is still alive, causing Spector to get distracted a few times.

Meanwhile, a police officer unjams the lock, and David knocks him out, and escapes through the tunnel, while a few officers pursue him, but he is able to lock them in, and goes after his wife. The chief of police asks to interview Amy alone, and right when she leaves Spector's side, she tells the chief to shoot Spector, but instead, he tries to calm her down, causing Spector to kill him. David then gets to the scene, and threatens to shoot Spector, causing the other police officers to come, and they shoot David, before he can shoot Spector.

Spector then drags Amy to the side, and knocks her out, before turning his attention to the old man. Amy wakes up, and goes after Spector, and wounds him, before Spector can kill the old man. He hits Amy, and is about to kill her but the police get there, and kill Spector.

Amy then goes to David's aid, and tells him that Spector's last words were that next time, she should pick the house. The film ends with them going in the ambulance.

== Cast ==
- Sean Faris as David Nash
- Briana Evigan as Amy Nash
- Dolph Lundgren as Andy Spector
- Jon Huertas as Ray Jaffe
- Richard Holden as Millard Hanson
- Alyshia Ochse as Trish Garrety

== Release ==
=== Theatrical ===
The film was released in the United States both in select theaters as well as on Video on Demand on May 11, 2012.
