= The Strangers (film series) =

Series of American psychological horror films

- Original film's logo
- Created by: Bryan Bertino
- Original work: The Strangers (2008)
- Years: 2008–present

Films and television
- Films: The Strangers (2008); The Strangers: Prey at Night (2018); The Strangers – Chapter 1 (2024); The Strangers – Chapter 2 (2025); The Strangers – Chapter 3 (2026)

Audio
- Soundtrack: The Strangers (2008)

The Strangers film series consists of American psychological horror films. Based on an original story by Bryan Bertino, the plot centers on three masked psycho-sociopathic home invaders that prey on the innocent owners. Though the first film was marketed as "based on a true story", this was a slight misdirect as the filmmaker stated that he wrote the concept from a series of break-in burglaries that took place in his neighborhood when he was growing up, as well as borrowing elements from the Manson Family Tate murders. Continuing this marketing technique, a "based on a true story" tag was also included at the beginning of the sequels.

The first film was initially met with mixed critical reception upon its release. The film had a worldwide theatrical gross of $83,051,676 against a $9,000,000 production budget. Following the announcement of a new film, some critics had since described the original as a cult classic. Conversely, its sequel was met with mixed reception with criticism directed towards its inferiority to the original, The film earned 6.4 times its production budget worldwide. Some critics have positively reviewed the movie and stated that it too deserves a cult following, elaborating that, where the first film was a tribute to 1970s horror films, the second film was meant to replicate the scares of the 1980s.

The series continued with the release of a standalone trilogy of films set within the same continuity starting with The Strangers – Chapter 1 and Chapter 2, (Note: Following some conflicting reports indicating otherwise, producer Courtney Solomon restated that the trilogy is neither a prequel nor remake, while the director and actors also stated that the trilogy takes place within the same continuity as the original movies.) which were released on May 17, 2024 and September 26, 2025. Chapter 3 followed on February 6, 2026. All three films received generally negative reviews from critics.

== Films ==
Title	U.S. release date	Director	Screenwriter(s)	Story by	Producers
The Strangers	May 30, 2008	Bryan Bertino			Doug Davison, Roy Lee and Nathan Kahane
The Strangers: Prey at Night	March 9, 2018	Johannes Roberts	Bryan Bertino & Ben Ketai		Wayne Marc Godfrey, Mark Lane, Robert Jones and Ryan Kavanaugh
The Strangers – Chapter 1	May 17, 2024	Renny Harlin	Alan R. Cohen & Alan Freedland	Bryan Bertino	Courtney Solomon, Mark Canton, Christopher Milburn, Gary Raskin, Charlie Dombeck and Alastair Birlingham
The Strangers – Chapter 2	September 26, 2025	Renny Harlin	Alan R. Cohen & Alan Freedland		Courtney Solomon, Mark Canton, Christopher Milburn, Gary Raskin, Charlie Dombeck and Alastair Birlingham
The Strangers – Chapter 3	February 6, 2026	Renny Harlin	Alan R. Cohen & Alan Freedland		Courtney Solomon, Mark Canton, Christopher Milburn, Gary Raskin, Charlie Dombeck and Alastair Birlingham

=== The Strangers (2008) ===
After attending their friend's wedding reception, James Hoyt and Kristen McKay, a young couple whose relationship is in trouble, stop at Hoyt's secluded summer home for the night. In the midnight hours as the couple discusses their future and are attempting to sort out their differences, a knock comes at the door. When they answer, a woman asks for someone who does not live there. She continues throughout the night. As the couple begin to question her intentions, things quickly escalate as the vacation home is taken under siege by three psychopathic masked strangers. The trio of assailants terrorize the couple while James and Kristen fight to survive. As they work together, they try to determine what these invaders want, and search for an escape before it's too late.

=== The Strangers: Prey at Night (2018) ===
After the events of the first film, Mike and his wife Cindy plan a family getaway. Striving to bond with their troubled teenage children, Luke and Kinsey, the couple plan to visit some relatives in Kalida, Ohio before the latter goes away to boarding school. Arriving at their destination, a deserted mobile home park, the family discusses their plans for their stay. In the dead of night, their discussion is interrupted with a knock at the door of the trailer home they rented. Upon answering, a woman asks for someone that is not there. As the night goes on, she relentlessly continues this behavior. Just when they begin to question the woman's intentions, three masked strangers begin to torment and hunt the family members. Frantically making their way to their relatives' home, they discover the couple to be murdered. With no escape, the family must work together despite their differences, as they fight to stay alive.

=== The Strangers – Chapter 1 (2024) ===
In August 2022, producer Roy Lee announced that three films would consecutively enter production beginning in September of that year. The trilogy will be a joint-venture production between Lionsgate Films and Frame Film, and will be distributed by Lions Gate Entertainment. Principal photography for the trilogy of films began concurrently in Slovakia, with production wrapping on all three movies by November 2022. In October 2023, the official titles of the three new movies were announced.

Directed by Renny Harlin, with a script written by Alan R. Cohen and Alan Freedland, the film centers around a young woman (Madelaine Petsch) as she drives cross-country with her long-time boyfriend (Froy Gutierrez) to start a new life together in the Pacific Northwest. When their car breaks down in Venus, Oregon, the couple is forced to rent an isolated Airbnb for the night. Through the night, they fight to stay alive as three masked strangers terrorize them. Harlin stated that the trilogy was intended to be neither a remake nor prequel, but its own rendition of the story and that the tone was going to be close to that of the first movie. The filmmaker also stated that it would explore who the killers are and where they come from.

=== The Strangers – Chapter 2 (2025) ===
This, the second film of an intended trilogy, was filmed consecutively with the previous movie. Directed by Harlin, with Petsch reprising her role, the plot will follow the events of the previous film, while the story will expand in "new and unexpected ways". Produced by Lionsgate Films, it will be distributed by Lions Gate Entertainment. Principal photography wrapped on the project, in November 2022. Chapter 2 was released on September 26th 2025.

=== The Strangers – Chapter 3 (2026) ===
This, the third and final installment of the trilogy, entered principal photography concurrently with the previous two installments. Harlin directed the project with Petsch reprising her role, and the story concluding the plot line of the trilogy. The film was produced by Lionsgate Films, and will be distributed by Lions Gate Entertainment. Production wrapped in November 2022.

=== Future ===
In October 2023 at the New York Comic Con, Harlin stated that there are plans to develop additional films beyond The Strangers Trilogy. The filmmaker acknowledged that the trilogy culminates into one cohesive story, while the plot may continue afterward. In 2026, actress Madelaine Petsch stated that all three chapters were going to be edited together with an intermission in the middle; a theatrical release was planned.

== Principal cast and characters ==
List indicators

This section includes characters who will appear or have appeared in the franchise in main roles.

- An empty grey cell indicates the character was not in the film, or that the character's official presence has not yet been confirmed.
- ^{C} indicates a cameo role.
- ^{U} indicates an uncredited appearance.
- ^{V} indicates a voice-only role.
- ^{Y} indicates a younger version of the character.

Character	Films				
Character	The Strangers	The Strangers: Prey at Night	The Strangers – Chapter 1	The Strangers – Chapter 2	The Strangers – Chapter 3
Character	2008	2018	2024	2025	2026
Gregory Rotter Man in the Mask / "Scarecrow"	Kip Weeks	Damian Maffei	Matúš Lajčák	Matúš Lajčák Jake Cogman^{Y}	Gabriel Basso Matúš Lajčák (Note: Lajčák serves as the body double who portrays Rotter, in various scenes when the character is in his villainous disguise.) Kyle Breitkopf^{Y} Jake Cogman^{Y}
Jasmine "Dollface"	Gemma Ward	Emma Bellomy	Olivia Kreutzova	Olivia Kreutzova	Ella Bruccoleri Olivia Kreutzova (Note: Kreutzova serves as the body double who portrays Jasmine, in various scenes when the character is in her "Dollface" disguise.) Stephanie Aubertin^{Y}
Shelly Barnes "Pin-Up Girl"	Laura Margolis	Lea Enslin	Letizia Fabbri	Ema Horvath Letizia Fabbri Nola Wallace^{Y}	Ema Horvath Letizia Fabbri (Note: Fabbri serves as the body double who portrays Barnes, in various scenes when the character is in her "Pin-Up Girl" disguise.) Finn Cofell^{Y} Nola Wallace^{Y}
Tamara	Mentioned	Mentioned	Mentioned	Pippa Blaylock^{Y}	Mentioned
Kirsten Mckey	Liv Tyler				
James Hoyt	Scott Speedman				
Kinsey		Bailee Madison			
Luke		Lewis Pullman			
Cindy		Christina Hendricks			
Mike		Martin Henderson			
Maya Lucas			Madelaine Petsch	Madelaine Petsch	Madelaine Petsch
Ryan Perez			Froy Gutierrez	Froy Gutierrez^{C}	Mentioned
Debbie Lucas			Rachel Shenton^{V}^{C}	Rachel Shenton^{V}^{C}	Rachel Shenton
Sheriff Howard Rotter			Richard Brake	Richard Brake	Richard Brake
Howard			George Young^{V}^{C}	Mentioned	George Young

== Additional crew and production details ==
Film	Crew/Detail					
Film	Composer(s)	Cinematographer	Editor	Production companies	Distributing company	Running time
The Strangers	Thomas Hajdu & Andy Milburn	Peter Sova	Kevin Greutert	Rogue Pictures, Vertigo Entertainment, Mandate Pictures, Intrepid Pictures	Universal Pictures	1 hr 25 mins
The Strangers: Prey at Night	Adrian Johnston	Ryan Samul	Martin Brinkler	Rogue Pictures, The Fyzz Facility, White Comet Films, Bloom Films	Aviron Pictures	1 hr 25 mins
The Strangers – Chapter 1	Justin Burnett & Òscar Senén	José David Montero	Michelle Harrison	Lionsgate Films, Stream Media, Fifth Element Productions, Sherborne Media, Vertigo Entertainment, LipSync Productions, Strangers Franchise Productions LLC, Hasbula Productions, Frame Films	Lions Gate Entertainment	1 hr 31 mins
The Strangers – Chapter 2	Justin Burnett & Òscar Senén	José David Montero	Michelle Harrison	Lionsgate Films, Stream Media, Fifth Element Productions, Sherborne Media, Vertigo Entertainment, LipSync Productions, Strangers Franchise Productions LLC, Hasbula Productions, Frame Films	Lions Gate Entertainment	1 hr 38 mins
The Strangers – Chapter 3	Justin Burnett & Òscar Senén	José David Montero	Kate Hickey	Lionsgate Films, Stream Media, Fifth Element Productions, Sherborne Media, Vertigo Entertainment, LipSync Productions, Strangers Franchise Productions LLC, Hasbula Productions, Frame Films	Lions Gate Entertainment	1 hr 31 mins

== Reception ==
=== Box office and financial performance ===
Film	Box office gross			Box office ranking		Home video sales gross	Worldwide total gross income	Budget	Worldwide total net income	Ref(s)
Film	North America	Other territories	Worldwide	All-time North America	All-time worldwide	North America	Worldwide total gross income	Budget	Worldwide total net income	Ref(s)
The Strangers	$52,597,610	$30,454,066	$83,051,676	#1,833	#2,241	$17,458,196	$100,509,872	$9,000,000	$91,509,872	
The Strangers: Prey at Night	$24,431,472	$7,712,790	$32,144,262	#3,509	#4,378	$1,935,156	$34,079,418	$5,000,000	$29,079,418	
The Strangers – Chapter 1	$35,202,562	$12,963,886	$48,166,448	#2,686	#3,372	$835,875	$49,002,323	$8,500,000	$40,502,323	
The Strangers – Chapter 2	$15,153,346	$6,768,403	$21,855,027	#4,617	#5,457		>$21,921,749	$8,500,000	$13,355,027	
The Strangers – Chapter 3	$8,560,986	$2,228,714	$10,789,700	#10,608	#19,903		$1,580,000		$1,580,000	
Totals	$135,945,976	$60,127,859	$194,501,782	x̄ #6,209	x̄ #7,536	$20,229,227	$207,093,362	$31,000,000	$176,093,362	

=== Critical and public response ===
Title	Rotten Tomatoes	Metacritic	CinemaScore
The Strangers	50% (167 reviews)	47/100 (28 reviews)	B−
The Strangers: Prey at Night	39% (123 reviews)	48/100 (25 reviews)	C
The Strangers – Chapter 1	21% (108 reviews)	43/100 (22 reviews)	C
The Strangers – Chapter 2	14% (76 reviews)	28/100 (12 reviews)	C−
The Strangers – Chapter 3	17% (52 reviews)	19/100 (12 reviews)	D

== In other media ==
=== Music video ===
Title	Artist	Release date	Director	Screenwriter(s)	Producer
Withorwithout	Parcels	October 17, 2018	Benjamin Howdeshell	Benjamin Howdeshell and Mike Doyle	Shawn Wallace

The music video for the single "Withorwithout", by indie pop-rock band Parcels, was released in October 2018. Based on The Strangers film series, the video was directed by Benjamin Howdeshell, with a script he co-wrote with Mike Doyle. The plot of the video clip follows a similar premise to the films. Milla Jovovich and Carsten Nørgaard star as the couple whose home is invaded, while members of the band Jules Crommelin, Patrick Hetherington, Noah Hill, Anatole Serret, and Louie Swain portray the home assailants. The music video includes a plot twist at the end, revealing that the wife is responsible, having faked a home invasion and murdered her husband.

It was later revealed that it was Jovovich's idea to turn the plot around with the reveal that the whole story had been in her character's head, serving as her alibi to the law enforcement. The actress, who also served as executive producer, stated that her parent-instincts would did not like the concept of the band being the real killers. Explaining that they are "sweet boys", she stated: "I [told them], 'I should be the killer.’ I'm sort of known for that anyway and by the way, it would take a lot more than five boys to break into my house. I felt like this could be a really interesting springboard." With the release of the single's music video, renowned artist Laurent Melki created a movie poster similar to the work he has completed before, with the artist saying: "...I imagined this poster as being that of a horror film and I illustrated it as I would have done for a "Freddy" or a blockbuster from the time when movie posters reflected an artist's imagination..."

The music video received praise from horror critics, and received attention from producers of the film series as well. Shortly after its release, producer Roy Lee approached Howdeshell with the idea of creating a feature-length film based on the video. The filmmaker alongside Doyle began writing a script that they pitched to the associated studios. Jovavich expressed interest in reprising her role from the music video. Speculation arose in September 2022 that one of the three films being made may be based on the concept.

=== In other films ===
The same record player scrub of Gillian Welch's "My First Lover", which was first used in The Strangers (2008) when the character Kristen first sees one of the intruders wearing a mask, is sampled as an "infinitely creepy record loop on the radio" in the 2009 British found footage analog horror short film No Through Road from Steven Chamberlain. It was additionally used during the last episode of his subsequent 2011–2012 sequel web series, with the music first briefly playing on the radio before repeating at the end of the film as a similarly masked man (portrayed by Chamberlain) slowly approaches four teenagers sitting in a car.

The titular characters of The Strangers make cameo appearances in the 2011 metafictional horror comedy film The Cabin in the Woods from Drew Goddard and Joss Whedon, portrayed by uncredited stand-ins, as some of the various populates released from the monster cells at the end of the film, subsequently seen burning a trio of security guards on the CCTV monitors.
