= The Strangers (2008 film) =

2008 film by Bryan Bertino

- Theatrical release poster
- Directed by: Bryan Bertino
- Written by: Bryan Bertino
- Produced by: Doug Davison; Roy Lee; Nathan Kahane
- Starring: Liv Tyler; Scott Speedman
- Cinematography: Peter Sova
- Edited by: Kevin Greutert
- Music by: Tomandandy
- Production companies: Rogue Pictures; Intrepid Pictures; Vertigo Entertainment; Mandate Pictures
- Distributed by: Rogue Pictures
- Release date: May 30, 2008
- Running time: 86 minutes
- Country: United States
- Language: English
- Budget: $9 million
- Box office: $82.4 million

The Strangers is a 2008 American psychological horror film written and directed by Bryan Bertino and starring Liv Tyler and Scott Speedman. The film follows a couple whose stay at a vacation home is disrupted by three masked intruders who infiltrate the home in the middle of the night. The screenplay was inspired by two real-life events: the multiple-homicide Manson family Tate murders and a series of break-ins that occurred in Bertino's neighborhood as a child. Some journalists noted similarities between the film and the 1981 Keddie cabin murders that occurred in Keddie, California, though Bertino did not cite this as a reference.

Development of The Strangers began in 2004, when Bertino submitted his screenplay for the film for a Nicholl Fellowship grant. The screenplay caught the attention of producer Roy Lee of Vertigo Entertainment. Bertino sold the screenplay to Universal Pictures in November 2004. Directors Justin Lin and Mark Romanek were originally attached to direct the project, but after both backed out, Bertino was hired as director. Made on a budget of $9 million, the film was shot on location in rural South Carolina in the fall of 2006.

Originally slated for a theatrical release in November 2007, it was postponed before eventually being released on May 30, 2008 by Rogue Pictures, a subsidiary of Universal. The film went on to become a sleeper hit, grossing $82 million at the box office worldwide. It received mixed reviews from critics, with some critiquing it for its sadism and sparse character development, while others praised its atmosphere, suspense, and psychological elements. (Note: Some critics unfavorably described the film as "sadistic" and critiqued its lack of character development, while others praised it for its elements of psychological horror and suspense.) The film was nominated for Best Horror Film at the 35th Saturn Awards, and Tyler won the award for Best Actress at the 3rd Scream Awards.

In the years since its release, The Strangers has become a cult film and received critical reassessment with praise for its tension and stylistic minimalism. Additionally, film scholars have interpreted it as a meditation on random crime in rural American communities, and common fears of unpredicted stranger-on-stranger violence. The film would eventually result in an eponymous franchise, first with the sequel The Strangers: Prey at Night (2018), co-written by Bertino, and later a standalone trilogy (2024-2026) set within the same continuity, (Note: Following some conflicting reports indicating otherwise, producer Courtney Solomon restated that the trilogy is neither a prequel nor remake,) starting with The Strangers: Chapter 1, on which Bertino was also a co-writer.

== Plot ==
In February 2005, James Hoyt and Kristen McKay arrive at James' isolated childhood summer home following a friend's wedding. James is reeling after an emotional Kristen rejected his marriage proposal at the reception. James calls his friend Mike to pick him up in the morning. The couple attempts to have sex but is interrupted by a knock at the door. They find a young woman asking for someone named Tamara. James dismisses her and builds a fire for Kristen.

After James goes to buy cigarettes for Kristen, the woman from earlier returns, asking the same question. Kristen dismisses her again. A masked man is seen silently watching her from inside the house. Kristen notices the smoke detector she had dropped on the floor earlier is now sitting on a chair and realizes someone is in the house. She finds her cellphone missing and is horrified when the front door is forced ajar. The young woman, now wearing a mask, peers into the house. Kristen locks the door and retreats.

James returns and reassures Kristen that nobody is in the house. They see the young masked woman, Dollface, watching from outside. James attempts to get his cellphone from their car but finds it ransacked and its tires slashed. The couple attempts to escape in the car, but are abruptly stopped when a masked brunette woman, Pin-Up Girl, rear-ends them in a pickup truck. After the Man in the Mask begins to break through the home's front door with an axe, James and Kristen hide in a bedroom with a shotgun.

Mike arrives shortly after and James, mistaking him for an intruder, accidentally shoots him dead. Distraught, James remembers an old radio transmitter in a garage on the property. James attempts to reach the garage before the Man in the Mask knocks him unconscious. After James fails to return, Kristen flees to the garage, where she witnesses Pin-Up Girl destroy the radio. Kristen returns to the house and hides in a pantry, only to be confronted by Dollface and the Man in the Mask, who incapacitates her.

The couple awakens at dawn, tied to chairs in the living room. Kristen demands an explanation for the intruders' actions, to which Dollface replies, "Because you were home." The offenders unmask themselves before taking turns stabbing the couple. They leave and come across two young boys distributing Mormon religious tracts. The boy gives Dollface one, and right before the strangers drive away, Pin-Up Girl says, "It will be easier next time." The two boys come upon the house, where they discover the bloodied bodies of Kristen, James, and Mike. When one of the boys examines the bodies, Kristen suddenly regains consciousness before grabbing his hand and screaming.

== Cast ==
- Liv Tyler as Kristen McKay
- Scott Speedman as James Hoyt
- Gemma Ward as Dollface
- Kip Weeks as Man in the Mask
- Laura Margolis as Pin-Up Girl
- Glenn Howerton as Mike

== Themes ==
Film scholar Kevin Wetmore noted the film's portrayal of violence as a reflection of its contemporary culture, writing: "Death is a random act in post-9/11 horror—the result of being in the wrong place at the wrong time, as the cliché goes. Unlike in eighties slasher horror, for example, where engaging in negative behavior such as drinking, doing drugs, and having premarital sex is often a forerunner to being killed by the killer(s); [here], death is random and unrelated to one's behavior."

In The Horror Show Guide: The Ultimate Frightfest of Movies, Mike Mayo noted the film's "grim realism," writing that the main characters "could have wandered out of a gloomy Ingmar Bergman film," ultimately branding the film as an example of "naturalistic domestic horror" akin to Michael Haneke's Funny Games.

The film has also been noted by scholar Philip Simpson as highlighting "the divide between the underprivileged and privileged classes," as well as for its inversion of commonly held beliefs about violence in urban areas and pastoral ethics: "The Strangers, as many horror films do ... undermines the conventional notion of rural society as a simpler, crime-free place. One might call the narrative sensibility informing The Strangers 'pastoral paranoia', in that danger lurks among the rough folk of the country rather than the suburbs and cities. Of course, it may be that provincial violence is a result of contamination, or in other words that the kind of stranger-upon-stranger violence typically associated with urban life metastasizes to the rural, a phenomenon noted by Louis Wirth."

In his book Hearths of Darkness: The Family in the American Horror Film (2014), scholar Tony Williams notes the film's setting within a 1970s-era home as representative of an "American tradition of violence that is random and without any coherent explanation." Additionally, Williams reads the three masked assailants as metaphors for the "repressed and unresolved tensions affecting the couple inside the house."

== Production ==
=== Screenplay ===
After attending the film school at the University of Texas at Austin, writer-director Bryan Bertino relocated to Los Angeles where he worked as a gaffer while writing screenplays. Bertino began developing the screenplay for the film, which at that time was titled The Faces; it was the third screenplay he had ever written.

In 2004, Bertino submitted the screenplay for a Nicholl Fellowship grant, which the Academy of Motion Picture Arts and Sciences awards to unproduced first-time screenwriters. The screenplay reached the quarterfinals of the grant, and resulted in Bertino being signed by a talent manager who connected him with producer Roy Lee of Vertigo Entertainment. "I thought it was amazing," Lee said. "It was a scary-on-the-page script. We were able to get multiple studios wanting to make it." In November 2004, Universal Pictures purchased the screenplay from Bertino.

==== Inspiration ====
I was thinking about the Tate murders and realizing that these detailed descriptions had painted a story of what it was like in the house with the victims. But none of the victims knew about the Manson family or why it was happening to them. So, I got really fascinated with telling the victims' tale. And not filling it in with an FBI profile and not filling it in with finding out that somebody's grandmother beat them and now they want to kill everybody. You read obituaries every day where someone is killed for a random reason. Yes, we may eventually find out why, but sometimes they don't.

— Bryan Bertino, on his inspiration for the film.

Bertino had a particular interest in the horror genre, noting how one can connect to an audience by scaring them, and would state in subsequent interviews that he grew up watching horror films. In particular, he stated he was significantly inspired by thriller films of the 1970s while writing the screenplay, and envisioned a film that "put the audience in the world of the victims." He also cited The Texas Chain Saw Massacre (1974) as a stylistic influence.

According to production notes and subsequent interviews, the film was inspired by true events from Bertino's childhood: Bertino explains: "As a kid, I lived in a house on a street in the middle of nowhere. One night, while our parents were out, somebody knocked on the front door and my little sister answered it. At the door were some people asking for somebody who didn't live there. We later found out that these people were knocking on doors in the area and, if no one was home, breaking into the houses."

In interviews, Bertino stated he was "very impressed" with some of the theories circulating on the Internet about the "true events" the movie is allegedly based on, but said that his main inspiration was the true crime book Helter Skelter, which is about the Manson Family murders; some journalists speculated that the film was also inspired by the unsolved 1981 Keddie cabin murders that occurred in a small vacation community in California's Sierra Nevada. The film's premise has been compared by some film critics to the French horror film Them, released two years earlier, which also features a couple terrorized by strangers in their remote home.

=== Casting ===
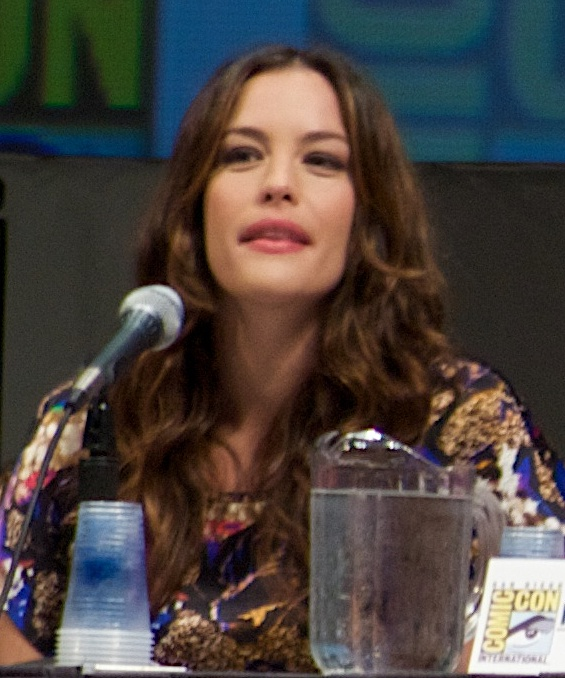
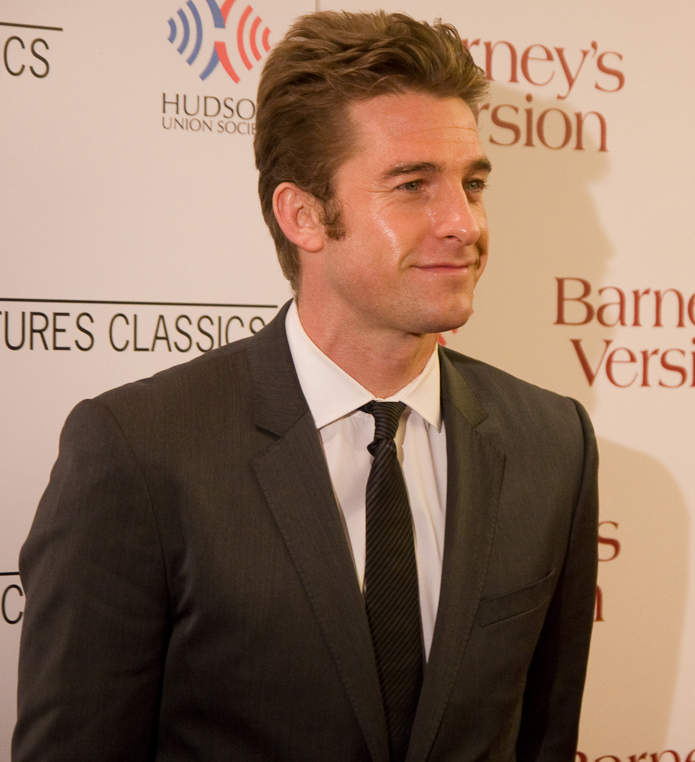
Liv Tyler and Scott Speedman were cast in the lead roles of Kristen and James, respectively.

When casting the two leading actors in the film, Bertino sought Liv Tyler for the role of Kristen. Thandie Newton and Charlize Theron also expressed interest in the role. Tyler, who had not worked for several years after the birth of her son, accepted the part after being impressed by the script, which she read while on a flight from Japan to Los Angeles: "I especially liked Bryan's way of saying a lot, but not saying everything. Often in movies, it's all spelled out for you, and the dialogue is very explanatory. But Bryan doesn't write like that; he writes how normal people communicate—with questions lingering. I knew it would be interesting to act that."

Tyler commented that she connected with the story because her stepfather, Todd Rundgren, had experienced a violent home invasion in which he and his pregnant girlfriend were assaulted. "I think one of them pistol whipped Todd which is horrible," she recalled. "There was nothing stolen. There was really no reason. It wasn't a crime of passion. But things like this happen a lot and often they're really random." Tyler later added that she felt the screenplay was "extremely well-written" and that Bertino's "vision was greater than most."

Canadian actor Scott Speedman was cast as James. Speedman was also impressed by the script, stating that "the audience actually gets time to breathe with the characters before things get scary as hell. That got me interested from the first pages". In a later interview, Speedman said he was "terrified" by the script despite it being a "simple story... It just had a feel to it that I knew if we could get half of what was on the page on the screen, it would land with an audience."

In casting the three masked intruders, Bertino chose Australian fashion model Gemma Ward for the part of Dollface, feeling she had the exact "look" he had imagined; Ward was officially cast in the film in September 2006. In preparing for the role, Ward read Vincent Bugliosi's Helter Skelter for inspiration. Kip Weeks was then chosen as the Man in the Mask, and television actress Laura Margolis, who found the script to be a real "page turner", was cast in the part of Pin-Up Girl. In retrospect, Bertino said he chose the three actors based on their body language and ability to convey their characters despite the fact that their faces remain unseen onscreen.

=== Filming ===
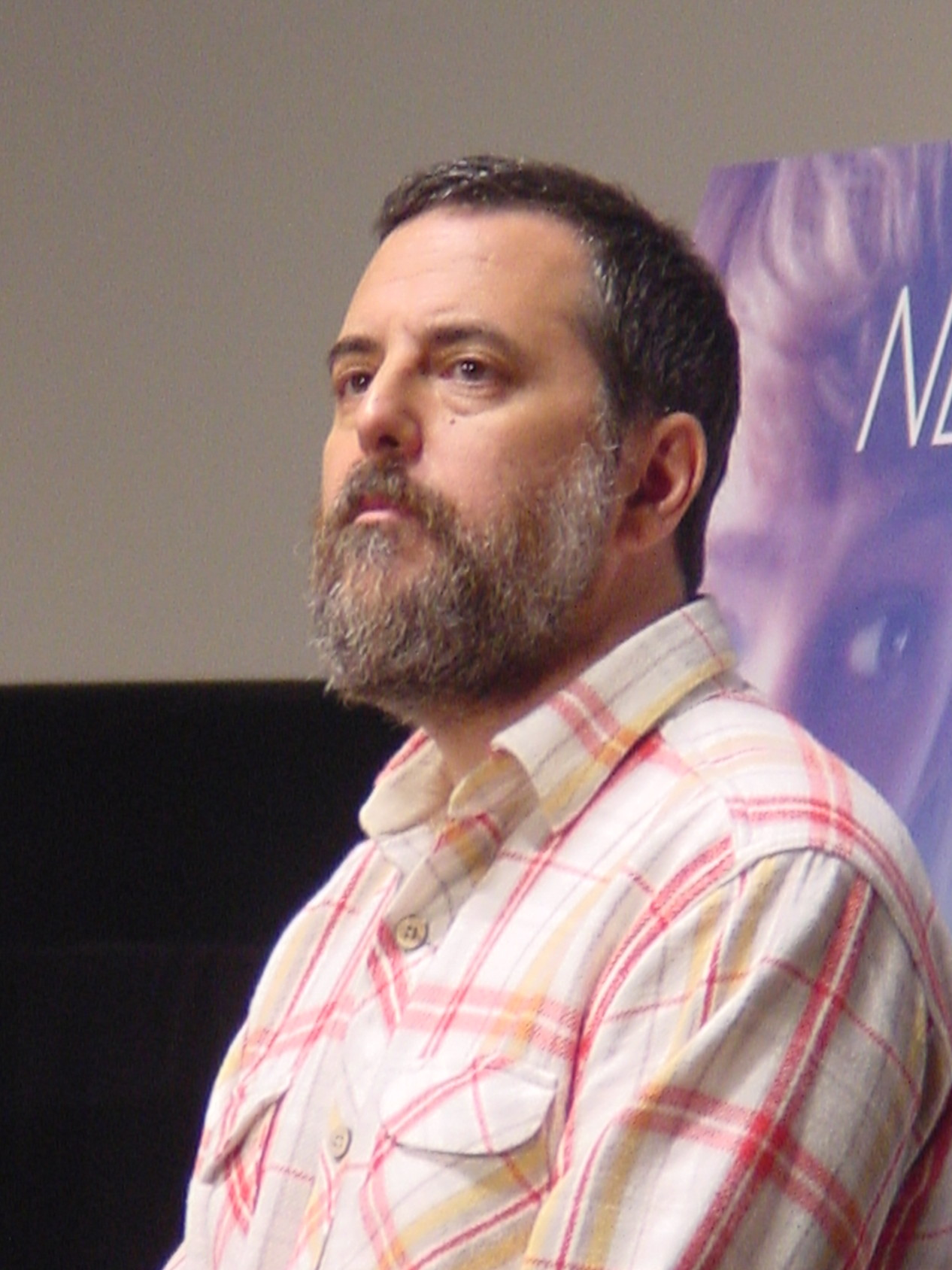
Mark Romanek was originally attached to direct the project but after he backed out, Bertino took over.

Bertino had not initially planned on directing The Strangers, and had been disconnected from the project after selling directorial rights to Universal Pictures. Justin Lin was initially attached to direct, followed by Mark Romanek. However, after Romanek sought a larger budget than the studio was willing to provide, he dropped out of the project. Approximately two years after Bertino had sold the screenplay, Universal passed the project on to its subsidiary, Rogue Pictures, who approached Bertino to direct the project, despite his lack of experience.

On a $9 million budget, filming for The Strangers began on October 10, 2006, with principal photography expected to complete on December 4, 2006. It was shot on location roughly 10 miles (16 km) outside of Florence, South Carolina, and the 2,000-square-foot (190 m^{2}) house interior was constructed by a set crew. The production was expected to generate approximately $6 million–$7 million into the local economy. Though the film takes place in 2005, the house itself was deliberately constructed with an architecture reminiscent of 1970s ranch houses and dressed in furnishings applicable to the era. Bertino based the house on the types of homes common where he had grown up in rural Texas. The property was located on the outskirts of Timmonsville, South Carolina. Despite weather complications, the film was largely shot in chronological order.

Tyler described the shoot as mentally and physically taxing due to the "heightened emotional state" that she and her fellow actors had to sustain. "It was very intimate and very small experience for all of us, and it was just really emotional for everybody," she said. "There wasn't ever a light day. And for the crew it was emotional as well." At one point, Tyler came down with tonsillitis due to the extensive screaming the role demanded. Tyler later said it was the most difficult film she had ever worked on, "both physically and emotionally."

According to Laura Margolis, who played the Pin-Up Girl, Tyler specifically requested that she not see her mask prior to filming: "I got strict instructions not to let Liv see me in my mask before we shot," Margolis recalled. "The first scene that I shot was stalking [her] outside of the barn. I had been told that she really wanted to be scared. She didn't want to have to fake it, and so it was my responsibility to really scare her. So we shot that scene, I ran at her, she started actually screaming, and then she kicked me away."

The masks featured in the film were chosen by Bertino, who wanted them to appear as though the killers "could have picked them up at any store."

=== Post-production ===
Film editor Kevin Greutert was hired to edit the film; at the time, he had recently finished editing Saw III. Several changes were made to the film during post-production, primarily regarding the conclusion: In the screenplay and the original footage shot, the three masked strangers reveal their faces on camera. After the sequence in which Kristen and James are stabbed, the strangers wander around the house, cleaning up parts of the crime scene before dressing into Kristen and James's clothes. Following test screenings, it was decided by the producers that the strangers' faces should remain unseen to the audience, which required the sequences following the stabbing to be excised.

== Music ==
A musical score, consisting of 19 pieces composed by score producers Tomandandy, was released on May 27, 2008, and was distributed by Lakeshore Records. The album was received with generally positive reviews by critics.

== Release ==
The producers originally planned for a summer release date of July 13, 2007, which was eventually postponed to November 2007; however, this date was postponed as well. The Strangers had its theatrical debut in the United States and Canada on May 30, 2008, distributed by Rogue Pictures, a subsidiary of Universal Pictures. It premiered later that summer in the United Kingdom, on August 29, 2008.

=== Marketing and promotion ===
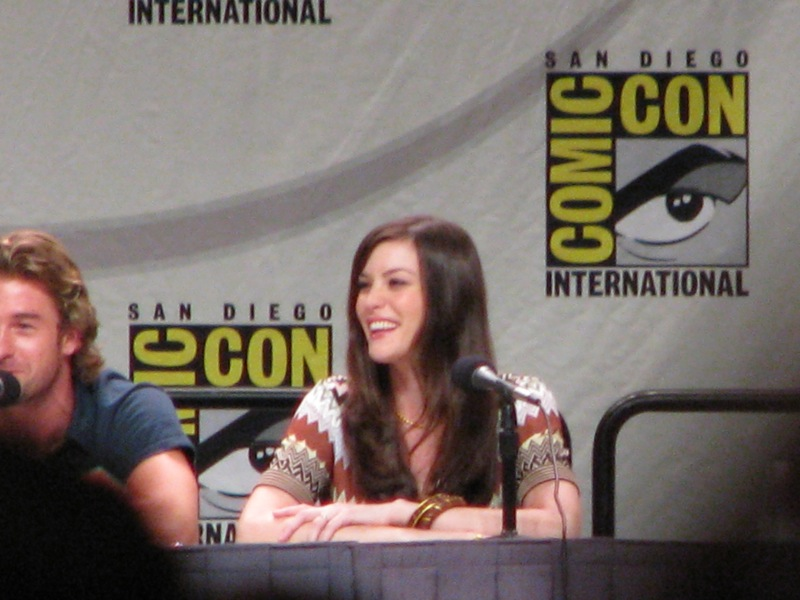
Scott Speedman and Liv Tyler promoting the film at the 2007 San Diego Comic-Con

In late July 2007, Bertino, Tyler and Speedman attended San Diego Comic-Con to promote the film; all three were present for a questions-and-answers panel session, as well as a screening of the film's official teaser trailer. Two one sheet posters for the film were also revealed at the event, one showing the three masked villains, and another featuring a wounded Liv Tyler.

In March 2008, a full-length trailer for the film was released via Apple's QuickTime trailer gallery. The trailer originally began running in theaters attached to Rogue Pictures' sci-fi film Doomsday in March 2008, and television advertisements began airing on networks in early-mid April 2008 to promote the film's May release.

In April 2008, roughly two months before the film's official theatrical debut, the final, official one-sheet for the film was released, featuring Liv Tyler standing in a darkened kitchen with a masked man looming behind her in the shadows.

=== Home media ===
Universal Pictures Home Entertainment released The Strangers on DVD and Blu-ray in the United States on October 21, 2008. Both the Blu-ray and DVD feature rated and unrated versions of the film, with the unrated cut running approximately two minutes longer and containing two additional scenes excised from the theatrical cut. The unrated cut of the film features an extended ending scene in which Kristen, after being stabbed and left for dead, hears Mike's cellphone ringing; she crawls to his body and attempts to use it to phone for help, but is confronted by the Man in the Mask who takes the phone before departing.

The DVD was released in the United Kingdom on December 26, 2008. The film was available on Universal VOD (Video on Demand) from November 19, 2008, through March 31, 2009.

In commemoration of the film's 10th anniversary, a two-disc collector's edition Blu-ray by Scream Factory was released on March 6, 2018, featuring a 2K video transfer, as well as a combination of new and archival cast and crew interviews. A region B limited edition Blu-ray was released in September 2020 by the United Kingdom-based distributor Second Sight Films. Scream Factory announced a new 4K UHD Blu-ray in North America which was released on September 10, 2024, with a steelbook edition available exclusively at Walmart.

== Reception ==
=== Box office ===
In its opening weekend, the film grossed $21 million in 2,467 theaters, ranking #3 at the box office and averaging $8,514 per theater. The film became a sleeper hit with a successful box-office return, earning $82.4 million worldwide.

=== Critical response ===
On the review aggregator website Rotten Tomatoes, 50% of 167 critics' reviews are positive, with an average rating of 5.5/10. The website's consensus reads: "The Strangers has a handful of genuinely scary moments, but they're not enough to elevate the end results above standard slasher fare." Metacritic, which uses a weighted average, assigned the film a score of 47 out of 100, based on 28 critics, indicating "mixed or average" reviews. Audiences polled by CinemaScore gave the film an average grade of "B−" on an A+ to F scale.

Unfavorable reviews included Roger Ebert's of the Chicago Sun-Times, who gave the film one-and-a-half stars out of four, saying: "The movie deserves more stars for its bottom-line craft, but all the craft in the world can't redeem its story." Bob Mondello of NPR said the film was "A sadistic, unmotivated home-invasion flick." Steven Rea of The Philadelphia Inquirer noted that "No one is getting at anything in The Strangers, except the cheapest, ugliest kind of sadistic titillation." Elizabeth Weitzman of the New York Daily News compared the film to 2007's Vacancy – a "comparison which does Strangers no favors. Vacancy director Nimród Antal gave us a pair of heroes who fought like hell to survive, becoming closer and stronger in the effort. Bertino's undeveloped protagonists are colossally stupid and frustratingly passive." Stephen Hunter of The Washington Post panned the film, calling it "a fraud from start to finish." Mick LaSalle of the San Francisco Chronicle, said the film "uses cinema to ends that are objectionable and vile," but admitted that "it does it well, with more than usual skill." Wesley Morris of The Boston Globe said of the director, "Bertino has the pretensions of an artist and the indelicacy of a hack. He tries to get under our skin with a pile driver." Stephen Whitty of The Star-Ledger opined of the film, "Unfolding with an almost startling lack of self-awareness, young filmmaker Bryan Bertino's debut is such a careful, straight-faced knockoff of '70s exploitation films that it plays like a parody."

The Oregonian's Mike Russell described the film as "Funny Games stripped of all the humor" and, though praising it for its sense of dread, added: "For a little over half an hour, the movie skillfully turns its hollow screws... but somewhere after that, the movie loosens its grip. In fact, it gets repetitive and a little silly, no matter how hard Liv Tyler works at being terrorized." Ed Gonzalez of Seattle Weekly, though also referencing director Michael Haneke's Funny Games, favorably noted the film's suspense and restraint: "Analog-man Bertino teases with the unknown until he's left no pimple ungoosed. Sometimes avoiding the synapse-raping bad habits of splat-packers Eli Roth and Alexandre Aja is its own reward; doing so without also submitting to Michael Haneke–style hand-slapping is nearly monumental." The Guardian's Peter Bradshaw awarded the film a two out of five star-rating, criticizing its editing and structure, though he conceded the film is "intermittently effective."

Among the positive reviews, Jeannette Catsoulis of The New York Times said The Strangers is "suspenseful," "highly effective," and "smartly maintain[s] its commitment to tingling creepiness over bludgeoning horror." Michael Rechtshaffen of The Hollywood Reporter called the film a "creepily atmospheric psychological thriller with a death grip on the psychological aspect." James Berardinelli of ReelViews gave the film 3 out of 4 stars, saying that, "This is one of those rare horror movies that concentrates on suspense and terror rather than on gore and a high body count." Scott Tobias of The A.V. Club said that "as an exercise in controlled mayhem, horror movies don't get much scarier."

Additional positive feedback for the film came from horror author Stephen King, who lauded the film in an article published on his official website, in which he reviewed it alongside M. Night Shyamalan's The Happening: "I can't imagine that anything in X-Files will match Liv Tyler's exchange with one of the masked home invaders in one particularly terrifying scene of The Strangers. 'Why are you doing this to us?' she whispers. To which the woman in the doll-face mask responds, in a dead and affectless voice: 'Because you were home.' In the end, that's all the explanation a good horror film needs." JoBlo.com reviewer Berge Garabedian also praised director Bertino for "building the tension nicely, with lots of silences, creepy voices, jump scares, use of songs and a sharp eye behind the camera, as well as plenty of Steadicam give it all more of a voyeuristic feel." Critic Kim Newman, writing for Empire magazine, remarked the film's retro style, noting: "Like much recent horror, from the homages of the grindhouse gang through flat multiplex remakes of drive-in classics, The Strangers looks to the '70s", and ultimately summarized it as "an effective, scary emotional work-out." Slant Magazine's Nick Schager listed The Strangers as the 9th best film of 2008.

=== Accolades ===
Award/association	Year	Category	Recipient(s) and nominee(s)	Result	Ref.
Empire Awards	2008	Best Horror	The Strangers	Nominated	
Fangoria Chainsaw Awards	2009	Best Score	Tomandandy	Nominated	
Fangoria Chainsaw Awards	2009	Best Wide-Release Film	The Strangers	Nominated	
Fright Meter Awards	2008	Best Screenplay	Bryan Bertino	Nominated	
Fright Meter Awards	2008	Best Director	Bryan Bertino	Nominated	
Fright Meter Awards	2008	Best Actor	Scott Speedman	Nominated	
Fright Meter Awards	2008	Best Actress	Liv Tyler	Nominated	
Golden Schmoes	2008	Best Horror Film	The Strangers	Nominated	
Golden Trailer Awards	2008	Best Horror Trailer	The Strangers	Nominated	
Golden Trailer Awards	2008	Best Sound Editing	The Strangers	Nominated	
Saturn Awards	2009	Best Horror Film	The Strangers	Nominated	
Scream Awards	2008	Best Horror Actress	Liv Tyler	Won	
Scream Awards	2008	Best Horror Movie	The Strangers	Nominated	
Teen Choice Awards	2008	Choice Movie: Horror/Thriller	The Strangers	Nominated	
Teen Choice Awards	2008	Choice Movie Actor: Horror/Thriller	Scott Speedman	Nominated	
Teen Choice Awards	2008	Choice Movie Actress: Horror/Thriller	Liv Tyler	Nominated	

== Legacy ==
In the years since its original release, The Strangers has developed a cult following. In 2009, it was ranked #13 on "Bravo's 13 Scarier Movie Moments" television piece, and in a 2018 retrospective, Clark Collis of Entertainment Weekly deemed the film a "modern-day slasher classic." In a 2024 retrospective for GQ, Jesse Hassenger praised the film as a "minimalist" slasher and a "canny mixture of seriousness and exploitation."

The Strangers has appeared on several retrospective lists of the best horror films since the millennium: The A.V. Club named it the 23rd best horror film made since 2000, while Rolling Stone ranked it number 35 in a list of the 65 greatest horror films of the 21st century. In 2023, it was included in a list of the most disturbing films of the 21st century by /Film.

The film has had several revival screenings in the years since its original release: It was exhibited in October 2024 by the Seattle International Film Festival as part of their "Scarecrowber" series, and had a nationwide theatrical re-release exclusive to Regal Cinemas on October 6, 2025, as part of the theater chain's "31 Screams" horror film revival series.

== Franchise ==
In August 2008, Rogue Pictures confirmed that a sequel was in the works, with Bryan Bertino writing the screenplay. The project was originally slated to enter principal photography in 2009, during which time it was tentatively titled The Strangers: Part II. Directors Laurent Briet and Marcel Langenegger were considered to direct, the latter after Ben Ketai was brought to rewrite the script, but Johannes Roberts eventually landed the job. After a troubled development period, filming on the sequel began May 30, 2017. Later titled The Strangers: Prey at Night, the film was released on March 9, 2018.

In 2024, The Strangers: Chapter 1, the first installment in a new trilogy was released. The film, which was shot consecutively with two following chapters by director Renny Harlin, serves as the first installment in a trilogy. The Strangers – Chapter 2 was released on September 26, 2025. The Strangers – Chapter 3 was released on February 6, 2026.

== See also ==
- List of films featuring home invasions

== Sources ==
- Mayo, Mike (2013). The Horror Show Guide: The Ultimate Frightfest of Movies (2nd ed.). Canton, Michigan: Visible Ink Press. ISBN 978-1-57859-420-7. OCLC 833339608.
- Simpson, Philip L. (2013). ""There's Blood on the Walls": Serial Killing as Post-9/11 Terror in The Strangers". In Alzena MacDonald (ed.). Murders and Acquisitions: Representations of the Serial Killer in Popular Culture. New York City, New York: Bloomsbury. ISBN 978-1-4411-9292-9. OCLC 918760963.
- Vander Kaay, Chris; Fernandez-Vander Kaay, Kathleen (2016). Horror Films by Subgenre: A Viewer's Guide. Jefferson, North Carolina: McFarland & Company. ISBN 978-0-7864-9837-6. OCLC 908375271.
- West, Alexandra (2016). Films of the New French Extremity: Visceral Horror and National Identity. Jefferson, North Carolina: McFarland & Company. ISBN 978-1-4766-6348-7. OCLC 934885163.
- Wetmore, Kevin J. (2012). Post-9/11 Horror in American Cinema. London, England: Continuum. ISBN 978-1-4411-9797-9. OCLC 787843534.
- Williams, Kevin (2014). Hearths of Darkness: The Family in the American Horror Film (Updated ed.). Jackson, Mississippi: University Press of Mississippi. ISBN 978-1-62846-107-7. OCLC 903533974.
