= The Strangers: Prey at Night =

2018 American film by Johannes Roberts

- Theatrical release poster
- Directed by: Johannes Roberts
- Written by: Bryan Bertino; Ben Ketai
- Based on: Characters by Bryan Bertino
- Produced by: James Harris; Wayne Marc Godfrey; Mark Lane; Robert Jones; Ryan Kavanaugh
- Starring: Christina Hendricks; Martin Henderson; Bailee Madison; Lewis Pullman
- Cinematography: Ryan Samul
- Edited by: Martin Brinkler
- Music by: Adrian Johnston
- Production companies: The Fyzz Facility; White Comet Films; Bloom; Rogue Pictures; Intrepid Pictures
- Distributed by: Aviron Pictures (United States); Vertigo Releasing (United Kingdom)
- Release dates: March 9, 2018 (United States); May 4, 2018 (United Kingdom)
- Running time: 85 minutes
- Countries: United States; United Kingdom
- Language: English
- Budget: $5 million
- Box office: $32.1 million

The Strangers: Prey at Night is a 2018 slasher film directed by Johannes Roberts, and written by Bryan Bertino and Ben Ketai. It is the sequel to The Strangers (2008) and the second installment of The Strangers film series. The film stars Christina Hendricks, Martin Henderson, Bailee Madison, and Lewis Pullman as a family vacationing at a secluded mobile home park where they are attacked by three masked strangers.

Development of the film began in August 2008 when Rogue Pictures had confirmed that a sequel was in the works, with Bertino co-writing the screenplay with Ketai. It was originally slated to begin principal photography in 2009, during which time it was tentatively titled The Strangers: Part II. Laurent Briet and Marcel Langenegger were considered as directors, but the job was eventually given to Johannes Roberts. After a troubled development period, filming to the sequel began on May 30, 2017.

The Strangers: Prey at Night was released in the United States on March 9, 2018, and in the United Kingdom on May 4, 2018, grossing $32.1 million worldwide on a budget of $5 million. The film received generally mixed reviews from critics.

== Plot ==
After the events of the first film, the three masked strangers—Dollface, Pin-Up Girl and the Man in the Mask—arrive at a secluded trailer park in Kalida, Ohio, and murder middle-aged couple Sheryl and Marvin.

The next day, their niece Cindy and her husband Mike take a trip with their children, 18-year-old Luke and 16-year-old Kinsey, to the trailer park to spend time together before Kinsey leaves for boarding school. Upon the family's arrival, an unmasked Dollface knocks at their front door and asks for Tamara, but she is turned away by Cindy. Kinsey and Luke find their uncle's mutilated body inside another trailer. Dollface knocks a second time and is again turned away. Mike follows Luke to find the bodies, while Cindy and Kinsey return to the family trailer. They find their cell phones smashed before Dollface attacks them. They retreat to the bathroom, where Cindy helps Kinsey climb through the skylight and escape before Dollface breaks in and stabs her to death.

Mike and Luke find the voicemail that Cindy left for their uncle before arriving, realizing that the offenders had been waiting for them that whole time. After fending off the Man in the Mask, they find Cindy dead. They drive around, shouting for Kinsey, before the Man in the Mask causes their van to crash by throwing a cinder block on the car's windshield. Mike gets impaled with a wooden plank and gives Luke the gun. After Luke leaves to find his sister, Mike is killed by the Man in the Mask with an ice pick. Kinsey encounters Dollface and is stabbed in the thigh before being rescued by Luke. Luke hides Kinsey under a porch while he runs to the general store for help. He calls 911 but realizes he is not alone when Pin-Up Girl cuts the phone line and the call goes dead. Luke escapes to the swimming pool, where he overpowers and kills Pin-Up Girl. An angry Man in the Mask arrives and stabs him in the back, leaving him to drown in the pool; Kinsey rescues him before setting off to find help.

A deputy finds Kinsey but is quickly killed by Dollface. Kinsey shoots Dollface in the chest with a shotgun that she found in the deputy's patrol vehicle, removes her mask, and asks why she is doing this, to which she replies, "Why not?" Kinsey then kills her with a shot to the head. The Man in the Mask arrives and rams the back of the police SUV, causing his truck to get stuck in the collision. Then Kinsey notices a hole in both the vehicles' gas tanks and ignites the gasoline leak, blowing up both trucks. The Man in the Mask survives the explosion and chases Kinsey, but he is severely injured and pulls out a shard of glass that was impaled in his stomach, then he passes out. Kinsey flags down a passing truck, but the driver flees upon seeing the horrifically burned man sneaking up behind Kinsey with an axe. She jumps into the back of the truck as the man clambers on behind her. She strikes him in the head with a baseball bat she finds in the truck's bed, hitting him with such force that she knocks him off the truck. As the truck speeds away, the camera focuses on the man lying in the road, staring at the camera, lifeless.

Some time later, Kinsey is at a hospital with Luke. As she awakens, she is shocked and frightened at the sound of loud knocks and the doorknob turning, and she drops her cup of water.

== Cast ==
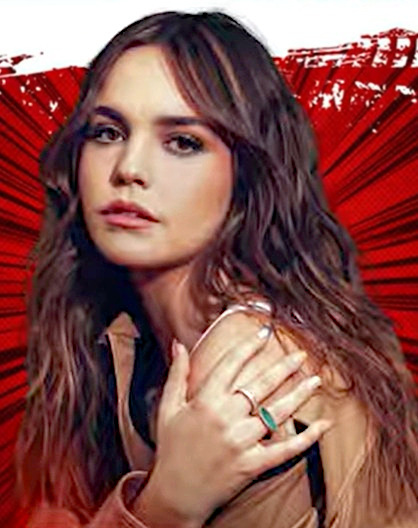
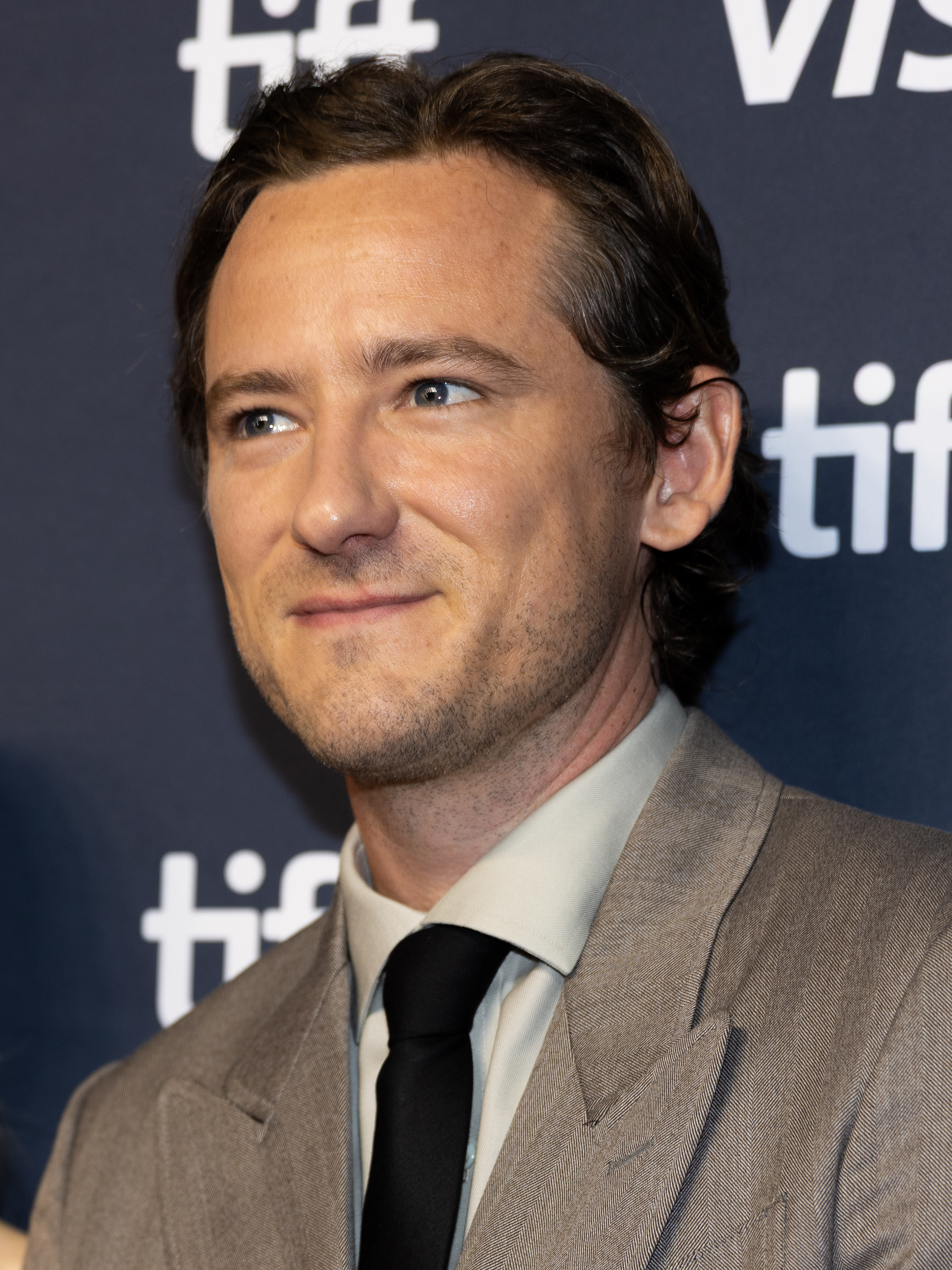
Bailee Madison and Lewis Pullman play siblings in the film.
- Christina Hendricks as Cindy
- Martin Henderson as Mike
- Bailee Madison as Kinsey
- Lewis Pullman as Luke
- Damian Maffei as Man in the Mask
- Emma Bellomy as Dollface
- Lea Enslin as Pin-Up Girl
- Mary Louise Casanta as Aunt Sheryl
- Ken Strunk as Uncle Marv
- Preston Sadleir as Officer Brooks

== Production ==
=== Development ===
Rogue Pictures' producers announced that a sequel to The Strangers was in development in August 2008, tentatively titled The Strangers: Part II. In a 2009 listing published by Bloody Disgusting, it was reported that the script would be written by Bryan Bertino and the film directed by Laurent Briet. In 2010 the horror website Shock Till You Drop reported that Relativity Media put The Strangers: Part II on hold because they decided the film might not be in their interest, despite the fact that Universal Pictures was willing to distribute it. However, Rogue Pictures confirmed in January 2011 that the sequel was again in production, and was then scheduled to begin filming as early as April 2011; in a press release, Rogue revealed the plot would concern "a family of four who have been evicted from their home due to the economy, and are paid a visit by the same three strangers from the first film."

According to Liv Tyler, star of the original film, Part II was slated for release in 2014, but that did not occur. In 2015 TheWrap reported that the sequel was in production and that Relativity Media and GK Films had scheduled the film for a December 2, 2016, release date, though it was later removed from the schedule.

Roberts said that while he was in Los Angeles, the producers of 47 Meters Down met him for dinner and asked if he could read a script called Prey at Night. He liked the script and wondered if he wanted to get involved in a sequel despite having released the first film years before, but he finally accepted and decided to add his personal touch.

=== Casting ===
In February 2017 it was announced that Johannes Roberts would be the sequel's new director and that filming would commence during summer later that year. In May 2017, Christina Hendricks, Bailee Madison and Lewis Pullman were reported as the film's stars, and production began in Los Angeles on May 30. In June 2017 it was announced Martin Henderson had also joined, along with the other main cast members.

=== Filming ===
Filming began in June 2017 in Covington, Kentucky; Kincaid Lake State Park in Falmouth, Kentucky; and lower Cincinnati, Ohio, and concluded on July 10, 2017.

== Release ==
The Strangers: Prey at Night was released in the United States on March 9, 2018, by Aviron Pictures and in the United Kingdom on May 4, 2018, by Vertigo Releasing.

== Reception ==
=== Box office ===
In the United States and Canada The Strangers: Prey at Night was released alongside The Hurricane Heist, Gringo, and A Wrinkle in Time, and it was projected to gross around $7 million from 2,464 theaters during its opening weekend. It made $4 million on its first day, including $610,000 from Thursday night previews. It went on to debut with $10.4 million, finishing third at the box office behind Black Panther and A Wrinkle in Time.

=== Critical response ===
On the review aggregator website Rotten Tomatoes, the film holds an approval rating of 39% based on 123 reviews, with an average rating of 5/10. The website's critics consensus reads, "The Strangers: Prey at Night may appeal to fans of the original who've been jonesing for a sequel, but its thin story and ironic embrace of genre tropes add up to a bloody step back." On Metacritic, the film has a weighted average score of 48 out of 100, based on 25 critics, indicating "mixed or average reviews". Audiences polled by CinemaScore gave the film an average grade of "C" on a scale of A+ to F, down from the "B−" given to the first film.

The film received mostly positive reviews from fans of the genre. Bloody Disgusting gave a positive review saying, "The Strangers: Prey At Night really takes The Strangers to the next level, and serves as a perfect introduction to The Strangers for new horror fans. You can go back and watch The Strangers and be just as happy for their previous relentless onslaughts". IGN also praised the film, writing that "Skillfully made, spooky, stylish, and featuring some quite good character work, The Strangers: Prey at Night stands much taller than the 2008 original. The central killers are plenty scary, and some of the images on display would make John Carpenter proud." Writing for /Film, Candice Frederick also gave the film a positive review with a 7/10 rating, writing that "Though its characters may fumble and its winks to the first film may not be as slick as I'd like them to be, Prey at Night does maintain the original commitment of presenting horror to the most mundane. It doesn't just disrupt an innocent setting of a quiet suburb...It is that relentless seclusion, heightened by a haunting soundtrack of otherwise harmless songs."

Brian Douglas from The Hollywood Reporter praised the tone of the film, writing, "While the original Strangers was devoid of any sense of the '80s, instead opting for a kind of timeless modern quality, Roberts' sequel boasts its stylistic debts, with everything from camera shots, and music choices culled from the '80s, forming an impressionistic collage of a time period that feels made for the big screen." Staci Wilson writing for Dread Central also praised the film, writing "Aside from the quick setup introducing the targets, The Strangers: Prey at Night really is a nonstop thrill ride. I know it's a cliché, but sometimes you've just got to call it as you see it. I was breathless from start to finish. Kudos to Roberts on his best movie yet! He was wise to amp up the atmosphere with a kick-ass original score and flawless cinematography."

Glenn Kenny of The New York Times gave the film a mixed review and compared sequences of the film to Lucio Fulci's Zombi and the slasher film The Mutilator, adding: "If you recognize those films, you might find yourself mildly diverted by this tawdry, occasionally effective shock-delivery device. Watching it with a demonstrative crowd in a Times Square theater proved to this former grindhouse devotee that sometimes you can go home again, at least momentarily. That said, the movie's ludicrously drawn-out finale sapped the good will out of some of my fellow audience members." Kimber Myers of the Los Angeles Times also gave the film a mixed review and wrote that "...although the film is as slim and poorly balanced as a cheap knife, The Strangers: Prey at Night is a stylish 1980s throwback that packs plenty of terror into its short running time. This isn't a horror movie that will take up residence in your nightmares for weeks, but the sequel to the solid 2008 original The Strangers is nonetheless just as effective in the short term as its well-made counterparts". Owen Gleiberman, writing for Variety, described the film as "Friday the 13th with four victims and three Jasons... [it's] shameless in its bluntly misanthropic family-of-lambs-to-the-slaughter violence, its blithe depravity that's more fetishized than felt. It doesn't take much, though—as it didn't in the '80s—to create a one-weekend horror hit."

The Guardian's Benjamin Lee gave the film more of a negative review, rating the film 2/5 stars despite praising Hendricks' performance, noting: "...it's just difficult to really invest in what happens to any of them. Before long, characters are all making stock horror movie decisions, and there's no amount of effective craftsmanship that can sell stupidity. Audience members will be too busy sighing at the screen to be scared."

== Future ==
Following the shutdown of Aviron Pictures, plans for future installments were diminished. In August 2022, producer Roy Lee announced plans for three films to consecutively enter production beginning in September of the same year with Lionsgate producing.

In September 2022, director Renny Harlin was announced to be directing all three films in the trilogy. Production commenced in Bratislava, Slovakia from September 2022 to November 2022, with Madelaine Petsch and Froy Gutierrez announced to be leading.
