= The Strangers: Chapter 1 =

2024 American film by Renny Harlin

- Theatrical release poster
- Directed by: Renny Harlin
- Screenplay by: Alan R. Cohen; Alan Freedland
- Story by: Bryan Bertino
- Based on: The Strangers by Bryan Bertino
- Produced by: Courtney Solomon; Mark Canton; Christopher Milburn; Gary Raskin; Alastair Burlingham; Charlie Dombek
- Starring: Madelaine Petsch; Froy Gutierrez; Gabriel Basso; Ema Horvath; Ella Bruccoleri
- Cinematography: José David Montero
- Edited by: Michelle Harrison
- Music by: Justin Burnett; Òscar Senén
- Production companies: Lionsgate Films; Fifth Element Productions
- Distributed by: Lionsgate Films
- Release dates: May 8, 2024 (L.A. Live); May 17, 2024 (United States)
- Running time: 91 minutes
- Country: United States
- Language: English
- Budget: $8.5 million
- Box office: $48.2 million

The Strangers: Chapter 1 is a 2024 American horror film. It is the third film in The Strangers film series and the first installment of an intended relaunch in the form of a standalone trilogy. (Note: Following some conflicting reports indicating otherwise, producer Courtney Solomon restated that the trilogy is neither a prequel nor remake, while the director and actors also stated that the trilogy takes place within the same continuity as the original films.) It was directed by Renny Harlin, with a screenplay by Alan R. Cohen and Alan Freedland, from a story by Bryan Bertino, the writer and director of the original film. The film stars Madelaine Petsch, Froy Gutierrez and Ema Horvath, and follows a couple (Petsch and Gutierrez) who come into contact with three psychopathic masked strangers while on a road trip.

Plans for a consecutively shot trilogy of Strangers films were announced in August 2022 by the original film's producer, Roy Lee. Harlin was announced as the director of all three the following month, with most of the cast joining soon after. Production on the films took place in Bratislava between September and November that year, often alternating daily between which of the three Chapters was being shot.

The Strangers: Chapter 1 had its world premiere at Regal L.A. Live on May 8, 2024, and was released theatrically in the United States by Lionsgate Films on May 17, 2024. The film received generally negative reviews from critics and grossed over $48.2 million worldwide. The film's sequel, The Strangers – Chapter 2, was released on September 26, 2025, and The Strangers – Chapter 3 was released on February 6, 2026.

== Plot ==
In 2017, in the small town of Venus, Oregon, a businessman named Jeff Morell is ambushed in the woods by three masked perpetrators—Scarecrow, Dollface, and Pin-Up Girl. Scarecrow ultimately kills Jeff with an axe.

Some time later, Maya and her boyfriend Ryan are driving across the country to Portland, where she is due for a job interview, while celebrating their five-year anniversary. En route, they stop to eat at Carol's Diner in Venus, where they encounter a few hostile locals. While at the diner, the couple notices a missing persons poster for Jeff. When their car refuses to start, the town's mechanic, Rudy, agrees to fix it by the next morning. Shelly, a friendly waitress at the diner, drives the couple to a secluded Airbnb cabin in the woods for them to stay the night.

That night, as Maya and Ryan settle into the cabin, a mysterious young woman (Pin-Up Girl) knocks on the front door, asking if "Tamara is home"; the couple dismisses her. Realizing he left his inhaler behind in the car, Ryan goes back into town using a motorcycle from the Airbnb to retrieve it. While alone in the house, Maya is unnerved when, once again, Pin-Up Girl comes to the door asking for Tamara.

In an attempt to relax, Maya decides to take a shower. While she showers, Scarecrow silently watches her. When the power goes out, Maya attempts to find a fuse box, but encounters Dollface and hides in an upstairs closet in fear. Ryan returns, dismissing the incident as a hallucination, as Maya had smoked marijuana earlier. Outside, they find Pin-Up Girl watching them from a distance; Ryan chases her off.

While eating dinner, Maya and Ryan are horrified to find a dead chicken with its throat slit hanging from the ceiling. As the three masked perpetrators break into the house, Maya and Ryan barricade themselves in a bedroom. Scarecrow smashes the door open with his axe and stares at the couple, before leaving the house. The couple tries to escape with the motorcycle, but it is blown to smithereens by Scarecrow. Using the home's crawl space, they narrowly avoid being found as Maya accidentally stabs her hand on a nail. Upon exiting the crawl space, the couple finds a nearby shed. Ryan finds a shotgun and rescues Maya from being attacked by Pin-Up Girl and Scarecrow.

As the couple leaves the shed, Ryan hears footsteps on the front porch and fires the shotgun, only to find that he has killed Joe, the property's owner. They attempt to escape in Joe's car, but Scarecrow repeatedly rams the car with his truck. When Ryan's leg becomes stuck, he urges Maya to run away. Ryan unsuccessfully attempts to shoot Scarecrow, who flees into the woods. Hiding in the woods, Maya calls 9-1-1 on Joe's cell phone despite the poor signal. While talking to the operator, she discovers Jeff's decaying corpse. As Maya tries to find her way back to the cabin, Dollface knocks her out and drags her away. Meanwhile, Ryan holds Pin-Up Girl at gunpoint, demanding to know Maya's whereabouts. Scarecrow knocks him out as well.

Both awaken tied to chairs in the house. In their last moments together, Ryan proposes to Maya, and she tearfully accepts. Pin-Up Girl fatally stabs Ryan in the stomach before Scarecrow knocks his chair over, leaving him to bleed out. Maya demands to know why they are doing this, to which Pin-Up Girl replies, "Because you're here." Scarecrow then stabs Maya in the stomach and knocks her chair over as well. Police sirens are heard in the distance as the perpetrators flee the scene. The next night, Maya awakens in a hospital bed, having survived the ordeal. As she rises from the bed, Scarecrow is lying beside her.

== Cast ==
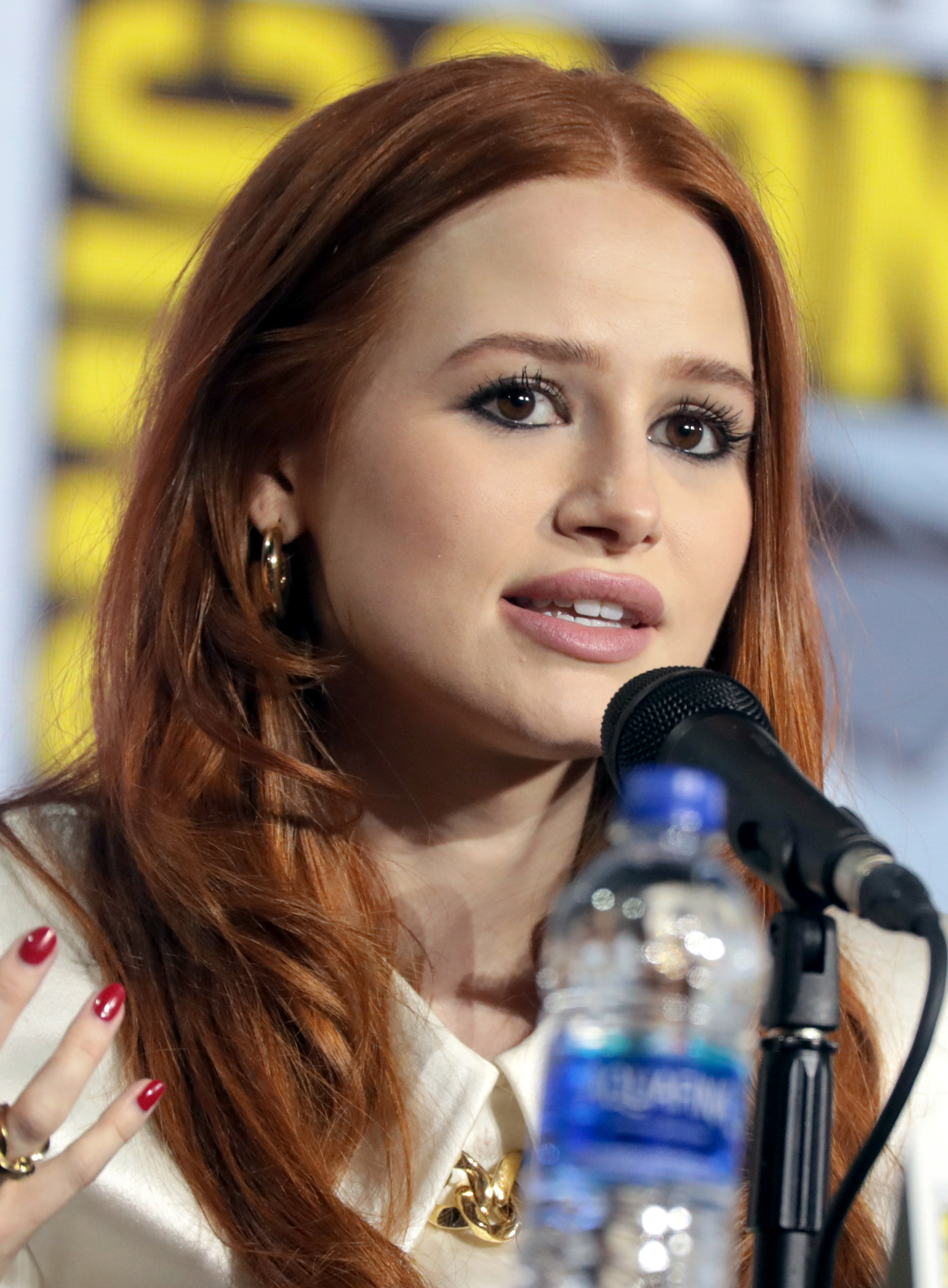
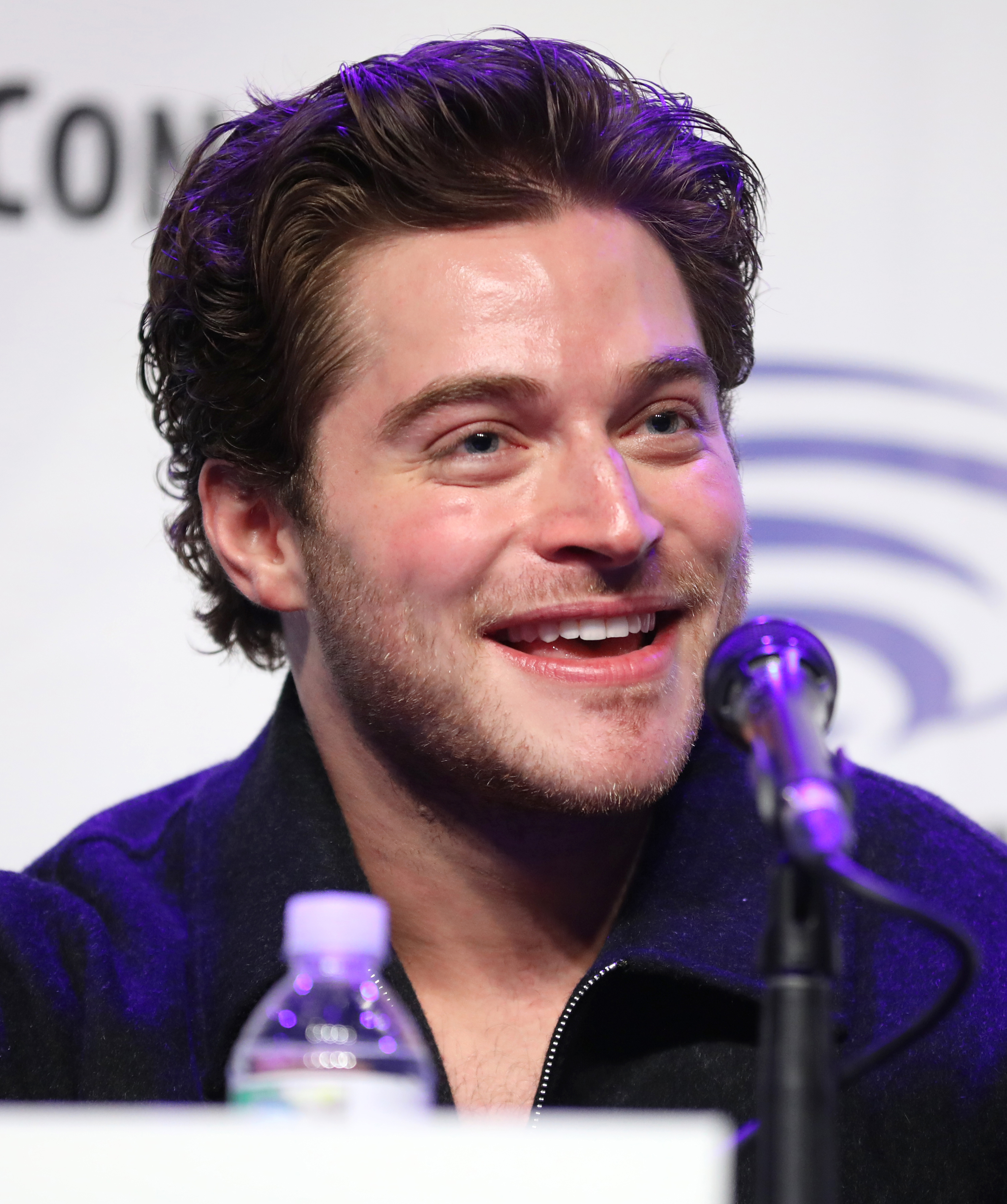
The film stars Madelaine Petsch and Froy Gutierrez.
- Madelaine Petsch as Maya, Ryan's longtime girlfriend and Debbie's younger sister
- Froy Gutierrez as Ryan, Maya's longtime boyfriend
- Gabriel Basso as Gregory (credit only)
- Ema Horvath as Shelly, a waitress at Carol's Diner
- Ella Bruccoleri as Jasmine (credit only)
- Richard Brake as Sheriff Rotter, the town sheriff
- Rafaella Biscayn as Eden, a Venus local
- Pedro Leandro as Deputy Walters, the town deputy
- Joplin Sibtain as Billy Bufford (credit only)
- Ryan Bown as Jeff Morell, a past victim of the Strangers
- Ben Cartwright as Rudy, a local mechanic
- Stevee Davies as Dougie, a local mechanic
- Janis Ahern as Carol, the owner of Carol's Diner
- Pablo Sandstrom as Neil, a Venus local
- Sara Freedland as Annie, a Venus local
- Rachel Shenton as Debbie, Maya's older sister
- George Young as Howard, Debbie's husband and Maya's brother in law

== Production ==
In August 2022, producer Roy Lee announced plans for three films to consecutively enter production beginning in September of the same year. Renny Harlin was revealed as director for at least one of the films, though he was in negotiations to direct each of the films. The trilogy was produced by Lionsgate Films, Fifth Element Productions and Frame Film, and will be distributed by Lionsgate.

Later in 2022, Harlin was announced as director on the three upcoming films. The first of the new trilogy was from a script written by Alan R. Cohen and Alan Freedland and story by Bryan Bertino. Courtney Solomon, Mark Canton, Christopher Milburn, Gary Raskin, Charlie Dombeck and Alastair Burlingham were confirmed as producers on the three films. The new trilogy is a relaunch of the series with producer Canton stating that the trilogy is intended to introduce new audiences to "world of The Strangers". Solomon stated that when they began the project the intent was to tell a bigger story than before, but also to "expand that world". The producer describes the three films as a "character study", compared to the previous two films. It was later clarified by the filmmaker and the actors, that the new trilogy of films takes place in the same universe as the original two films.

In September 2022, Madelaine Petsch, Froy Gutierrez and Gabriel Basso were cast. In October 2022, Ema Horvath was announced to be a part of the cast. The following month, Rachel Shenton joined the cast.

Principal photography on all three films took place in Bratislava, Slovakia, over 52 days from September to November 2022. Harlin told Entertainment Weekly that it was "the challenge of a lifetime, but I also really embraced it. On a Monday morning, I could be shooting the second chapter, and Monday afternoon I could be shooting the first chapter, and Tuesday morning I could be shooting the third chapter. it was incredibly demanding for the actors, for the continuity in terms of the make-up and wardrobe, and for my director of photography, because we wanted to create a visual language that develops so that the movies get bigger, more epic, as we go [on]. It just kept all of our juices pumping all the time".

== Release ==
Lionsgate hosted the world premiere at Regal L.A. Live on May 8, 2024. It was released theatrically in the United States on May 17, 2024.

=== Home media ===
The Strangers: Chapter 1 was released on digital platforms on July 16, 2024, followed by the 4K Ultra HD Blu-ray, Blu-ray and DVD releases on July 23, 2024, with audio commentary, the theatrical trailer and featurettes.

== Reception ==
=== Box office ===
The Strangers: Chapter 1 grossed $35.2 million in the United States and Canada, and $13 million in other territories, for a worldwide total of $48.2 million.

In the United States and Canada, Chapter 1 was released alongside IF and Back to Black, and was projected to gross $7–9 million from 2,856 theaters in its opening weekend. After making $5 million on its first day (including $1.2 million from Thursday night previews), the film went on to debut to $12 million, slightly over-performing and finishing in third behind IF and Kingdom of the Planet of the Apes.

=== Critical response ===
On the review aggregator website Rotten Tomatoes, 21% of 108 critics' reviews are positive. The website's consensus reads: "Lacking the chilling suspense of the original The Strangers and proving to be just unpleasant, this Chapter 1 closes the book on itself." Metacritic, which uses a weighted average, assigned the film a score of 43 out of 100, based on 22 critics, indicating "mixed or average" reviews. Audiences polled by CinemaScore gave the film an average grade of "C" on an A+ to F scale, the same as Prey at Night, while those polled by PostTrak gave it a 50% overall positive score.

Mark Olsen of the Los Angeles Times said "The first Strangers movie had an air of creepy suspense, as the besieged couple often looked off into blank space, bringing an unnerving tension to what was often nothing. The new film never conjures the same feelings of rustic menace". Michael Nordine of Variety wrote "It's also off to a promising enough start, especially as the end of Chapter 1 makes it clear that the next two entries will be continuations of the story introduced here rather than standalone narratives" and that "Time will tell, but for now there's enough reason for devotees of the series to be cautiously optimistic—and even a little curious—about the next two chapters".

== Sequels ==
Two sequels were filmed concurrently with Chapter 1. Harlin stated they were intended to be neither a remake nor reboot, and that the tone was going to be close to the first film. Harlin said in an interview: "We, of course, shot them on top of each other and mixed up, like movies are always made. But we had to keep in mind that this is one story arc. It is one 4.5-hour movie, and the first movie is a first act. It sets up the characters and the terror and the Killers and our main character, who will survive the first movie, but then go on a journey for the next two".

In an interview with The Hollywood Reporter, Harlin stated Chapter 2 and Chapter 3 go in different directions, and cover Petsch's character over a span of four days after her encounter.
