= Go Away! =

British comedy film

- Directed by: Ed Kear; Cringo Williamson
- Screenplay by: Ed Kear; Cringo Williamson
- Produced by: Kristyna Sellnerova; Gina Lyons
- Starring: Michael Socha; Hugh Bonneville; Ella Bruccoleri
- Production company: Rude Guests / Low Road Films
- Country: United Kingdom
- Language: English

Go Away! is an upcoming independent British comedy crime film written and directed by Ed Kear and Cringo Williamson and starring Hugh Bonneville, Ella Bruccoleri and Michael Socha.

== Premise ==
A man finds his cannabis growing jeopardised following an incident with a bailiff.

== Cast ==
- Hugh Bonneville as Bernard
- Michael Socha as Kyle
- Ella Bruccoleri as Gemma
- Steve Speirs
- Jo Martin
- Niky Wardley
- Jeff Mirza
- Chris Gascoyne

== Production ==
The film is directed by Ed Kear and Cringo Williamson from their own script and produced by Kristyna Sellnerova and Gina Lyons. The film is partly based on their own experiences with bailiffs. The film has a number of independent executive producers including Lyndon Baldock from Templeheart Films, Mark Sandell, Vik Bansal, Tarek Anthony Jabre and Melora Donoghue and Randy Wooten from Low Road Films, and Ram Getz and Michael Mortensen from GM Management.

The cast is led by Hugh Bonneville, Ella Bruccoleri and Michael Socha. The cast also includes Steve Speirs, Jo Martin, Niky Wardley, Jeff Mirza, and Chris Gascoyne.

Principal photography took place in Hertfordshire in June 2024.
