= Sightless =

2020 film directed by Cooper Karl

- Official release poster
- Directed by: Cooper Karl
- Screenplay by: Cooper Karl
- Based on: Sightless by Cooper Karl
- Produced by: Kaila York; Rick Benattar; Nigel Thomas; Todd Y. Murata
- Starring: Madelaine Petsch; Alexander Koch; December Ensminger; Lee Jones
- Cinematography: Andrew Jeric
- Edited by: Don Money
- Music by: Phillip Lober
- Distributed by: MarVista Entertainment
- Release dates: September 2, 2020 (Dances with Films Festival); September 29, 2020 (United States)
- Running time: 89 minutes
- Country: United States
- Language: English

Sightless is a 2020 American psychological thriller film written and directed by Cooper Karl, based on his 2017 short film of the same name. The film stars Madelaine Petsch and Alexander Koch.

The film had its world premiere at Dances with Films Festival on September 2, 2020. It was released digitally and on demand on September 29, 2020, by MarVista Entertainment.

== Plot ==
Following a brutal attack in a parking lot, violinist Ellen Ashland wakes up in the hospital to learn that she has been blinded. During her recuperation at the hospital, she receives a phone call from her brother, who says he has found an apartment for her. Ellen wakes in her new apartment with no memory of having travelled there. Clayton, a nurse her brother has hired, arrives to care for her as she begins to adjust to life without sight.

From one of her windows Ellen can feel a breeze and hear traffic below. But she can’t hear any sounds from the other window in her living room. When she questions Clayton, he says the window just has thicker glass.

One night, Ellen hears the voice of a woman in distress; she initially believes the woman is in her apartment, but then realises the noise is coming through the vent from the adjoining apartment. The following morning, she goes next door and puts up a sticky note on her neighbor's door asking her to join her for tea.

Later that day, her neighbor shows up and introduces herself as Lana. Ellen is suspicious of Lana as she seems scared to talk. Lana tries to leave Ellen's apartment but when Ellen tries to stop her she touches Lana's face and is alarmed to feel a wound with stitches. Lana reacts by whispering "trust no one," and then flees Ellen's apartment upon the arrival of her abusive husband, Russo.

Ellen contacts Detective Bryce (the officer working on her assault case) who sends Officer Neiman to check on Lana; he confirms she is okay and does not have any recent wounds. Ellen expresses her concerns to Clayton but he tells her that he has met Lana, that she seems unhinged, and Ellen should not worry about her.

Later that day Ellen is standing near her door when she hears footsteps. At first she thinks it's Lana and begins to apologize to her for the misunderstanding, but it’s Russo, who warns her to stay away from his wife, and says he will be talking to the building management about her.

A few moments later Clayton arrives and a frantic Ellen tells him that Russo has threatened her. Angry and protective, Clayton says he will talk to Russo, but Ellen stops him. Then Clayton hints that he has feelings for her but when he confesses this, Ellen turns him down and he leaves dejected.

Hearing someone enter the apartment, Ellen thinks that Clayton has returned and begins to apologize. However, the newcomer attacks Ellen. Hearing the assailant’s breathing pattern she recognises it as that of the person who attacked her in the parking lot. She manages to dial 911 before passing out. She is awoken by a paramedic and a worried Clayton, who informs her that Detective Bryce is here to see her. Detective Bryce reassures her that after Clayton left her apartment, nobody else entered. Detective Bryce also confirms to Ellen that her friend Sasha, who was having an affair with Ellen's ex-husband, is the prime suspect in Ellen's attack. Feeling alone and unsure of anyone, Ellen is overwhelmed and decides to commit suicide. She writes letters to her brother, Sasha, and Clayton, and then jumps from her apartment balcony.

Ellen wakes up on the floor of a soundproof room. She quickly realises the apartment she was staying in was fake, and all of the noises "outside" were coming from a speaker system. She explores the hallway only to find she cannot escape. Ellen finds Lana in the hallway and asks her for help, asking about the place they are living in, and telling her that she knows they are being watched. Lana tells her that this is home and flees before answering any more questions. Clayton then arrives to cook Ellen dinner and knocks twice; at that moment she realises all of the people she has interacted with since her attack - the doctors, the detective, the paramedic, Russo - were all Clayton playing different roles, but giving himself away by his habit of knocking on any surface twice. Ellen knocks Clayton unconscious and finds Lana who reveals she is Clayton's sister and she helped him kidnap Ellen. She then tells Ellen their only hope of escape is by using the hidden vent in Clayton's room.

Clayton finds and once again captures Ellen. He confesses that after his mother's death, his father kept him captive in the basement for three years. During this time, Lana played recordings of Ellen playing the violin, resulting in him becoming obsessed with her. Ellen tries to escape via the vent and finds a vial. She realises it contains the same substance that was used in the attack that left her blind. She finds her way back to her room, chased by Clayton, and sprays the substance in his face. Upon seeing Clayton disabled, Lana guides Ellen to an exit into the outside world.

Six months later, Ellen prepares to go on stage to the sound of an elated crowd, as an assistant asks her if she needs any help. She declines and walks on stage herself.

== Cast ==
- Madelaine Petsch as Ellen Ashland
- Alexander Koch as Clayton
- December Ensminger as Lana Latch
- Lee Jones as Russo Latch
- Deniz Akdeniz as Nurse Omar
- Jarrod Crawford as Detective Bryce
- Matthew Yang King as Doctor Katsuro
- Mikandrew as Paramedic Rafferty
- Samuel Gostnell as Officer Neiman

== Production ==
Principal photography on the film began in late May and ended on May 31, 2019.

== Reception ==
On review aggregator Rotten Tomatoes, Sightless holds an approval rating of 40% based on five reviews, with an average rating of 4.5/10. From Ready Set Cut, Jonathon Wilson gave the film two stars out of five, criticizing it for its predictable twist, calling it "a drab", and summarizing it as "the kind of film that has been sat on a shelf for a while for reasons that are entirely understandable". Johnny Loftus from Decider was more positive, and compared the film and its ending to Wait Until Dark (1967) and Shutter Island (2010), and recommended readers to watch it online. Writing for the Australian Broadcasting Corporation, a journalist gave the film three stars and a half out of five, and said that "Sightless ticks the boxes for [...] an over-the-top thriller that is not afraid to ramp things up to eleven, its manic climax just one of its many enjoyable charms."
