= The Strangers – Chapter 3 =

2026 film by Renny Harlin

- Theatrical release poster
- Directed by: Renny Harlin
- Written by: Alan R. Cohen; Alan Freedland
- Based on: Characters by Bryan Bertino
- Produced by: Courtney Solomon; Mark Canton; Gary Raskin; Christopher Milburn; Alastair Birlingham; Charlie Dombek; Madelaine Petsch
- Starring: Madelaine Petsch; Gabriel Basso; Ema Horvath; Ella Bruccoleri; Richard Brake; Rachel Shenton; George Young; Pedro Leandro
- Cinematography: José David Montero
- Edited by: Kate Hickey
- Music by: Justin Burnett; Òscar Senén
- Production company: Fifth Element Productions
- Distributed by: Lionsgate
- Release dates: January 15, 2026 (Los Angeles); February 6, 2026 (United States)
- Running time: 91 minutes
- Country: United States
- Language: English
- Box office: $11.2 million

The Strangers – Chapter 3 is a 2026 American horror film directed by Renny Harlin. It serves as the fifth film in The Strangers film series, and the final installment of a new trilogy following Chapter 1 (2024) and Chapter 2 (2025). The film stars Madelaine Petsch, Gabriel Basso, Ema Horvath, and Richard Brake, and follow Maya (Petsch) after she survives an attack by the strangers again as she tries to escape the town while seeking revenge against them.

The Strangers – Chapter 3 premiered in Los Angeles on January 15, 2026, and was released in the United States by Lionsgate on February 6. Similar to its two predecessors in the trilogy, the film received negative reviews from critics.

== Plot ==
In 2021, a woman named Claire stops at the small town of Venus, Oregon, and meets the clerk, Shelly Barnes, when checking into the local motel. That night, a woman knocks on her door and asks if Tamara is home. When Claire turns her away, Pin-Up Girl (Shelly), Dollface (Jasmine), and Scarecrow (Gregory Rotter) kidnap and kill Claire in an underground lair.

In the present, following Shelly's death (Note: As depicted in The Strangers - Chapter 2 (2025)), Maya seeks refuge in a local church and is surprised by Gregory, who has come to the church to mourn Shelly. Maya is then detained by Sheriff Rotter, but steals his patrol car as she grows suspicious of him. However, she wrecks the car and is kidnapped by Gregory and Jasmine. A series of flashbacks reveal Gregory is Sheriff Rotter's son; after Gregory takes the blame for Shelly's murder of his classmate, Tamara, Sheriff Rotter (whose reputation kept Gregory from incarceration) agreed to cover up Gregory and Shelly's crimes, so long as they did not murder any Venus townsfolk.

Gregory and Jasmine take Maya to a sawmill where they dispose of Shelly's body in a woodchipper. They hold Maya hostage in their underground hideout, where Gregory brands Maya with the smiley face tattoo and forces her to don Shelly's old mask. Additional flashbacks reveal Gregory and Shelly met Jasmine as teenagers when she was passing through Venus. After Jasmine's boyfriend flirted with Shelly, they followed them to the motel to kill them, but Jasmine had already killed him. Jasmine then joined forces with Gregory and Shelly.

In the present, Maya's sister, Debbie, and her husband, Howard, arrive in Venus from Portland, after Maya's EMT never brought her to Portland. They become suspicious of Sheriff Rotter after being tipped off by Carol's Diner waitress Annie, and follow him with their bodyguard, Marcus. Sheriff Rotter later kills his deputy, Tommy Walters, after he realizes Rotter has been aiding the perpetrators in their crimes.

Meanwhile, Gregory ties Maya up and forces her into the truck, whereupon he and Jasmine take her to search for a new victim. They spot a couple at the nearby gas station and follow them back to the motel, where they train Maya to act as Pin-Up Girl and ask if Tamara is home. When the couple refuse to open the door, Gregory smashes it down and ties the couple to chairs; when Maya refuses to choose one of the couple to kill, he murders the male. While Jasmine is distracted, Maya stabs her with her own machete before smashing her head against the floor, killing her. Gregory forces Maya to kill the woman using Jasmine's machete. He then forces Maya back in the truck and is informed by Sheriff Rotter that Debbie and Howard are tailing him and he is leading them to the sawmill.

While Debbie and Howard seek refuge in an abandoned trailer, Marcus goes to investigate but is killed by Sheriff Rotter at the sawmill. Gregory arrives at the trailer site and taunts Debbie and Howard before flipping the trailer with his truck. He breaks into the trailer, kills Howard with his axe, and forces Debbie outside, killing her as Maya, tied up in the truck, watches on. Gregory then grabs Jasmine's body and loads it into Sheriff Rotter's car before untying Maya and leaving her with the truck and a knife. Maya puts Debbie's dead body into the truck and drives out of Venus. However, realizing Gregory's murders will continue, Maya turns back and arrives at his underground hideout.

Maya enters the hideout with a shotgun (previously taken from Ryan) that was kept in the truck. She shoots Sheriff Rotter dead and enters Gregory's shrine, whereupon Gregory unmasks himself, and the two bond over having everything they cared for taken away by each other. After Maya tells Gregory that the shotgun is empty, the two embrace as she feigns romantic interest in him. Maya stabs Gregory with the knife he left her with, revealing her attraction was a ploy to get him to lower his guard. She then finishes him off with his axe before departing the lair with his mask.

== Cast ==
- Madelaine Petsch as Maya, the only survivor of the Strangers
- Gabriel Basso as Gregory / Scarecrow, a Venus local and one of the masked strangers who is targeting Maya
  - Jake Cogman as young Gregory
  - Kyle Breitkopf as teenage Gregory
- Ema Horvath as Shelly / Pin-Up Girl, a waitress at Carol's Diner and one of the masked strangers, who was killed by Maya
  - Nola Wallace as young Shelly
  - Finn Cofell as teenage Shelly
- Ella Bruccoleri as Jasmine / Dollface, a Venus local and one of the masked strangers who is targeting Maya.
  - Stephanie Aubertin as teenage Jasmine
- Richard Brake as Sheriff Rotter, the town sheriff and Gregory's father
- Rachel Shenton as Debbie, Maya's sister who comes to Venus from Portland to track down Maya
- George Young as Howard, Debbie's husband and Maya's brother-in-law who comes to Venus from Portland to track down Maya
- Pedro Leandro as Deputy Walters, the town deputy
- Miles Yekinni as Marcus, Debbie and Howard's chauffeur and bodyguard who assists them in their search of Maya

== Production ==
Principal photography on all three films commenced in September 2022 in Bratislava, Slovakia, and wrapped in November 2022. Following the release of The Strangers: Chapter 1, The Strangers – Chapter 2 and The Strangers – Chapter 3 underwent a month of additional photography to rework the film with audience feedback from the first film in mind. Three weeks of the reshoots were devoted to Chapter 3.

== Release ==
The Strangers – Chapter 3 had its world premiere in Los Angeles on January 15, 2026, and was released in the United States on February 6, 2026.

== Reception ==
=== Box office ===
As of March 1, 2026, The Strangers – Chapter 3 has grossed $9 million in the United States and Canada, and $2.03 million in other territories, for a worldwide total of $11.03 million.

=== Critical response ===
On the review aggregator website Rotten Tomatoes, 18% of 56 critics' reviews are positive, with an average rating of 3.1/10. The website's consensus reads: "A dismal conclusion to a trilogy that had already exhausted The Strangers' appeal from the jump, this final chapter goes to show that familiarity can breed contempt." Metacritic, which uses a weighted average, assigned the film a score of 19 out of 100, based on eleven critics, indicating "overwhelming dislike". Audiences polled by CinemaScore gave the film an average grade of "D" on an A+ to F scale, the lowest of the franchise.

== Future ==
Petsch stated that all three chapters were going to be edited together with an intermission in the middle; a theatrical release was planned.
