= The Strangers – Chapter 2 =

2025 film by Renny Harlin

- Theatrical release poster
- Directed by: Renny Harlin
- Written by: Alan R. Cohen; Alan Freedland
- Based on: Characters by Bryan Bertino
- Produced by: Courtney Solomon; Mark Canton; Christopher Milburn; Gary Raskin; Alastair Burlingham; Charlie Dombek
- Starring: Madelaine Petsch; Gabriel Basso; Froy Gutierrez; Ema Horvath; Ella Bruccoleri
- Cinematography: José David Montero
- Edited by: Michelle Harrison
- Music by: Justin Burnett; Òscar Senén
- Production company: Fifth Element Productions
- Distributed by: Lionsgate Films
- Release dates: September 16, 2025 (Hollywood); September 26, 2025 (United States)
- Running time: 98 minutes
- Country: United States
- Language: English
- Budget: $8.5 million
- Box office: $22 million

The Strangers – Chapter 2 is a 2025 American horror film serving as the fourth film in The Strangers film series, and the second installment of a new trilogy following The Strangers – Chapter 1 (2024). The film was directed by Renny Harlin, and stars Madelaine Petsch, Gabriel Basso, Froy Gutierrez, Ema Horvath, and Ella Bruccoleri, and follows Maya (Petsch) after she survives being stabbed by the strangers and discovers that they are still hunting and trying to kill her.

The film had its Hollywood premiere on September 16, 2025, and was released in the United States by Lionsgate Films on September 26, 2025. Much like Chapter 1, it received generally negative reviews from critics. The final installment, The Strangers – Chapter 3, was released on February 6, 2026.

== Plot ==
In 2021, in the small town of Venus, Oregon, Carol's Diner waitress Shelly greets a man named Frank Quincanoh, sharing the information she learns about him with an unseen patron. Later that night, Shelly knocks on the door of his motel room and asks if Tamara is home. Some time later, Shelly (Pin-Up Girl), Scarecrow, and Dollface kill Frank in the woods on a rainy night.

In the present day, Maya Lucas is recovering in Venus County Hospital following her encounter with the three masked perpetrators. (Note: As depicted in The Strangers: Chapter 1 (2024)) Her claims are brushed off by the sheriff and his deputy, who try to avoid the involvement of the state and federal police to prevent their cover-ups from being exposed. As night falls, Maya finds herself trapped in the hospital as the perpetrators pursue her after discovering she is alive. After evading Scarecrow in the morgue, where he kills an orderly, Maya escapes and comes across a horse farm where she tries to seek help from the owner who is killed by Pin-Up Girl with a crossbow. Maya attacks her with a pitchfork before flagging down Nurse Danica and her roommate Chris Sampson, who are driving home on a nearby road.

Maya agrees to go to their home. On the drive, they encounter their roommates, Gregory and Wayne, walking home in the rain. The two get in the car. Shortly afterwards, Maya jumps out of the car after having a panic attack about the occupants of the car being her assailants. She hides in the woods where she stitches up her opened wounds. Maya comes across an abandoned campsite and starts a fire but is soon attacked by a wild boar who was freed from captivity by Scarecrow. Maya successfully kills the boar and flees back through the woods. Meanwhile, Pin-Up Girl, who was watching Maya, has flashbacks to when she was a child in school with Scarecrow, where she killed another student, Tamara, out of jealousy.

Maya arrives at the cabin where she was attacked by the perpetrators and changes into new clothes. She is found by Billy Bufford, a state police trooper, who tries to help her but is killed by Pin-Up Girl with a crossbow. Maya flees in Bufford's truck, but the engine eventually dies down outside a house belonging to Nurse Danica, Chris, Gregory, and Wayne. They take her in for the night and Gregory tells Maya that she is the only one who has survived the perpetrators. After Gregory leaves the house, Pin-Up Girl and Dollface attack and kill the remaining occupants as well as the private EMT sent to take Maya to Portland.

Maya escapes into the EMT's ambulance but is ambushed by Pin-Up Girl who was hiding inside. She stabs Pin-Up Girl in the neck with scissors. Maya flees in the ambulance, but during the ride, Pin-Up Girl tries to strangle her. Maya intentionally wrecks the ambulance, causing Pin-Up Girl to fly out of the windshield, killing her almost instantly. Maya flees into the woods as Scarecrow and Dollface arrive in their truck. The pair mourn their loss, removing Pin-Up Girl's mask as Maya watches them from the woods.

== Cast ==
- Madelaine Petsch as Maya, a survivor of the strangers
- Gabriel Basso as Gregory, a Venus local
- Froy Gutierrez as Ryan, Maya's fiancé who was killed by the strangers
- Ema Horvath as Shelly, a waitress at Carol's Diner and one of the masked strangers (Pin-Up Girl)
- Ella Bruccoleri as Jasmine, a Venus local
- Richard Brake as Sheriff Rotter, the town sheriff
- Brooke Johnson as Nurse Danica, a nurse at Venus County Hospital
- Rafaella Biscayn as Eden, a Venus local
- Rachel Shenton as Debbie, Maya's older sister
- Pedro Leandro as Deputy Walters, the town deputy
- Joplin Sibtain as Billy Bufford, an Oregon state police officer
- Milo Callaghan as Wayne

== Production ==
Principal photography on all three films commenced over 52 days in September 2022 in Bratislava, Slovakia, and wrapped in November 2022. Following the release of The Strangers: Chapter 1, The Strangers – Chapter 2 and The Strangers – Chapter 3 underwent a month of additional photography to rework the film with audience feedback from the first film in mind. One week of the reshoots was devoted to Chapter 2, with flashbacks added to flesh out the villain's backstory and an investigation subplot involving Joplin Sibtain cut.

== Release ==
The Strangers – Chapter 2 had its Hollywood premiere on September 16, 2025. It also screened at Fantastic Fest on September 20, 2025. The film was released in the United States by Lionsgate Films on September 26, 2025.

== Reception ==
=== Box office ===
The Strangers – Chapter 2 grossed $15 million in the United States and Canada and $7 million in other territories, for a worldwide total of $22 million.

In the United States and Canada, The Strangers – Chapter 2 was released alongside One Battle After Another and Gabby's Dollhouse: The Movie, and was projected to gross $6–8 million from 2,650 theaters in its opening weekend. It ended up debuting to $5.8 million, finishing fifth at the box office. In its second weekend the film grossed $2.8 million (a drop of 51%), finishing in eighth.

=== Critical response ===
On the review aggregator website Rotten Tomatoes, 15% of 74 critics' reviews are positive, with an average rating of 3.6/10. The website's consensus reads: "A tired and tensionless slog, Chapter 2 squanders its potential for suspense with lazy storytelling, predictable scares, and a complete misunderstanding of what makes The Strangers so terrifying." Metacritic, which uses a weighted average, assigned the film a score of 28 out of 100, based on 12 critics, indicating "generally unfavorable" reviews. Audiences polled by CinemaScore gave the film an average grade of "C−" on an A+ to F scale.

=== Accolades ===
Accolades received by The Strangers - Chapter 2
Award	Date of ceremony	Category	Recipient(s)	Result	Ref.
Golden Raspberry Awards	March 14, 2026	Worst Supporting Actress	Ema Horvath	Nominated	

== Sequel ==
The final installment of the trilogy titled The Strangers – Chapter 3, was released on February 6, 2026.
