= Laura Margolis =

American actress (born 1973)

Laura Margolis (born July 16, 1973) is an American actress. She has performed in guest roles on television for such series as The Drew Carey Show, Friends, Line of Fire, Monk, and Mistresses.

== Early life ==
Margolis was born July 16, 1973 in Chicago, Illinois.

== Career ==
Margolise played the part of Marcy in Alistair Legrand's 2015 horror film, The Diabolical. She also had a recurring role as Daisy in the series Dirty Sexy Money. Her film career consists mainly of roles in short films, but her first mainstream role was in the 2008 horror film The Strangers as the masked villain "Pin-Up Girl".

Margolis also appeared in the 2018 film Higher Power.

== Filmography ==
=== Film ===
Year	Title	Role	Notes
2008	The Strangers	Pin-Up Girl	
2015	The Diabolical	Marcy	
2016	The Vanished	Clara	
2018	Higher Power	Rebecca	

=== Television ===
Year	Title	Role	Notes
2001	The Huntress	Holly	Episode: "Who Are You?"
2001	The Norm Show	Tina	Episode: "Norm Is Fat"
2001	Family Law	Diane	Episode: "Recovery"
2001	The Drew Carey Show	Flashback Girl	Episode: "Drew Live III"
2002	Friends	Woman Giving Birth	Episode: "The One Where Rachel Has a Baby"
2003	Line of Fire	Estelle Sommers	2 episodes
2006	Masters of Horror	Brenda	Episode: "Sounds Like"
2007	The Wedding Bells	Bridget	Episode: "Wedding from Hell"
2007	Monk	Carol Young	Episode: "Mr. Monk and the Bad Girlfriend"
2007–2009	Dirty Sexy Money	Daisy	12 episodes
2009	10 Items or Less	Saundra	Episode: "Sesquicentennial"
2013	Mistresses	Teacher	Episode: "Full Disclosure"
