= Madelaine Petsch =

American actress and YouTuber (born 1994)

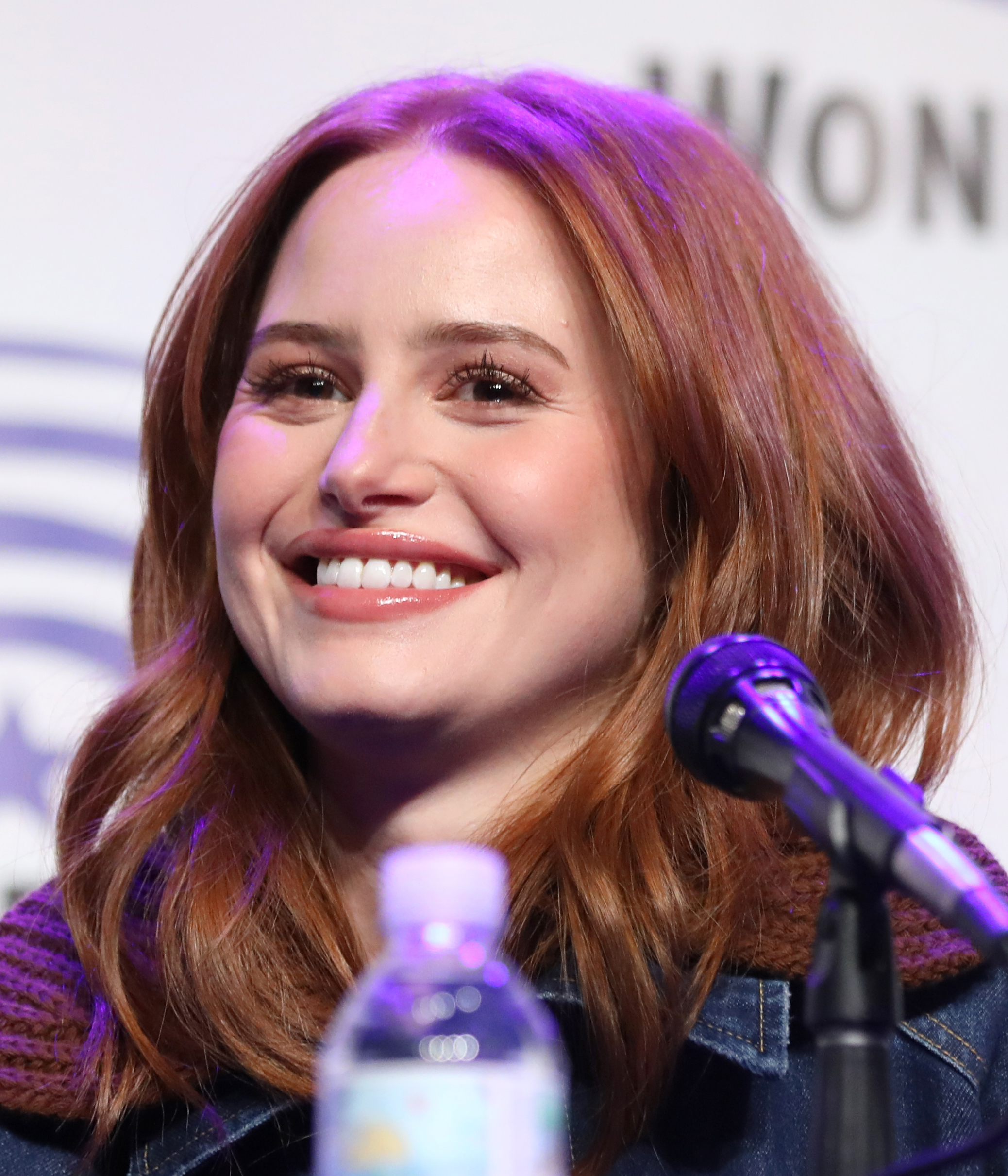
- Petsch at the 2024 WonderCon
- Born: Madelaine Grobbelaar Petsch; August 18, 1994 (age 32); Port Orchard, Washington, U.S.
- Citizenship: United States; South Africa
- Occupations: Actress; Former YouTuber
- Years active: 2014–present

YouTube information
- Channel: Madelaine Petsch
- Genre: Vlog
- Subscribers: 6.15 million
- Last updated: July 16th, 2026

Madelaine Grobbelaar Petsch (born August 18, 1994) is an American-South African actress and social media personality. She is best known for portraying Cheryl Blossom on The CW television series Riverdale (2017–2023).

== Early life ==
Petsch was born on August 18, 1994, to Timothy and Michele Petsch, in Port Orchard, Washington. At the age of three, she began dance classes, and two years later enrolled in theater classes. Petsch's parents are from South Africa, and she spent the first ten years of her life dividing her time between South Africa and the state of Washington. She attended the Tacoma School of the Arts and relocated to Los Angeles after graduating. Petsch has one older brother, Shaun, who is three years her senior.

== Career ==
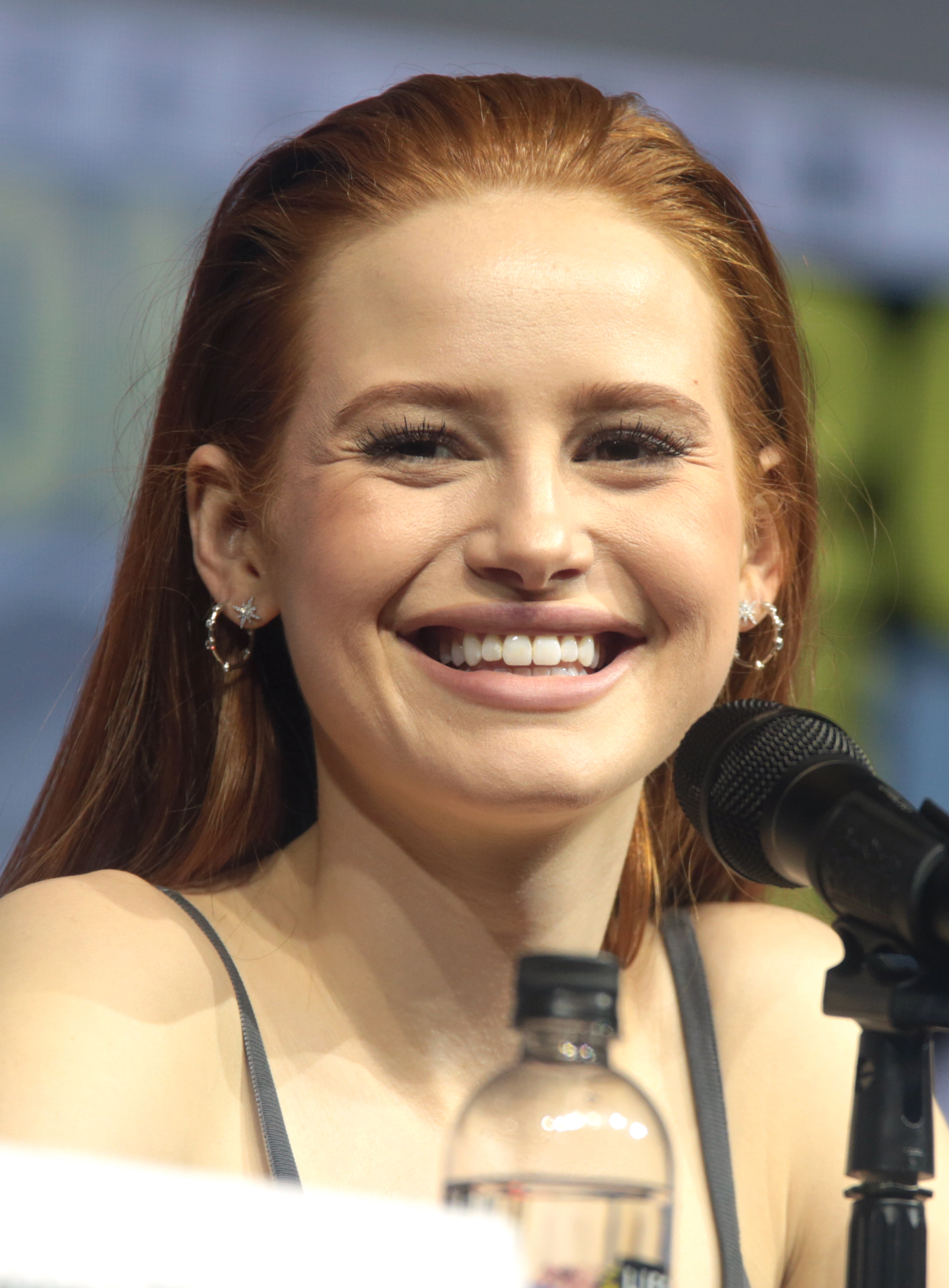
Petsch in 2018

Petsch appeared in a national advertising campaign for Coca-Cola in 2014. In February 2016, she was cast as Cheryl Blossom in The CW's Riverdale, having been pinned for the role since late 2015 after meeting the casting director, who was at the time working on Legends of Tomorrow. The series began filming in September of that year. It premiered on January 26, 2017, and ended on August 23, 2023, after seven seasons. In March 2017, she joined the cast of the film Polaroid, which was released in 2019. In January 2019, it was announced that Petsch would star in and executive produce the horror-comedy film Saint Clare, but in 2022, Bella Thorne took over the role. Petsch's lead performances in the horror movies Polaroid (2019), Sightless (2020), Jane (2022), and The Strangers film series have garnered her the reputation as a scream queen.

In April 2018, Petsch collaborated with sunglasses company Privé Revaux and released her own collection of sunglasses. Petsch has a YouTube channel, stating that the inspiration to start one was so fans could know the "real her" outside of acting.

== Personal life ==
From early 2017 to February 2020, Petsch was in a relationship with musician Travis Mills. Since August 2022, Petsch has been in a relationship with music manager Anthony Li. As of March 2025, she has been linked to Tyga.

== Filmography ==
=== Film ===
Year	Title	Role	Notes	Ref.
2014	The Hive	Current girl #2		
2016	The Curse of Sleeping Beauty	Eliza		
2017	F the Prom	Marissa		
2019	Polaroid	Sarah		
2020	Sightless	Ellen Ashland	Also co-producer	
2020	Nightwalkers	Unknown Role	Short film	
2022	Jane	Olivia Brooks	Also producer	
2022	About Fate	Clementine Pratt		
2022	Hotel for the Holidays	Georgia		
2024	The Strangers: Chapter 1	Maya Lucas	Also executive producer	
2025	The Strangers – Chapter 2	Maya Lucas	Also executive producer	
2025	Maintenance Required	Charlotte "Charlie" O'Malley	Also executive producer	
2026	The Strangers – Chapter 3	Maya Lucas	Also producer	
2026	Pretty Babies	Gemma		

=== Television ===
Year	Title	Role	Notes
2015	Instant Mom	Mermaid	Episode: "Gone Batty"
2017–2023	Riverdale	Cheryl Blossom Young Penelope Blossom Abigail Blossom Poppy Blossom Rose Blossom Chastity Blossom	Main role; 131 episodes 2 episodes 7 episodes Episode: "Chapter Ninety-Nine: The Witching Hour(s)" 2 episodes Episode: "Chapter One Hundred and Fifteen: Return to Rivervale"
2020	The Simpsons	Sloan (voice)	Episode: "The Hateful Eight-Year-Olds"
2026	American Horror Story: 13	Kira Coswell	2 episodes
TBA	The Watcher	—N/a	Main role (season 2)

=== Web series ===
Year	Title	Role	Notes	Ref.
2020	Acting for a Cause	Jane Bennet	Episode: "Pride and Prejudice"	
2020	Day by Day	Narrator	Voice role; episode: "Relocation"	
2020–2021	The Shadow Diaries	Eliza Gold	Voice role; podcast	

=== Music videos ===
Year	Title	Artist(s)	Role	Ref.
2020	"Malibu" (At Home Edition)	Kim Petras	Herself	
2026	"Do Me Right"	Mr. Fantasy	Herself	

== Awards and nominations ==
Year	Award	Category	Nominated work	Result	Ref.
2017	Teen Choice Awards	Choice Hissy Fit	Riverdale	Won	
2018	MTV Movie & TV Awards	Scene Stealer	Riverdale	Won	
2018	Teen Choice Awards	Choice Hissy Fit	Riverdale	Won	
2019	MTV Movie & TV Awards	Best Musical Moment	Riverdale	Nominated	
2019	Shorty Awards	Breakout YouTuber of the Year	—	Nominated	
2019	Teen Choice Awards	Choice Ship (with Vanessa Morgan)	Riverdale	Nominated	
2022	Streamy Awards	Best Crossover (with Lili Reinhart and Camila Mendes)	—	Nominated	
