= Mark Canton =

American film producer

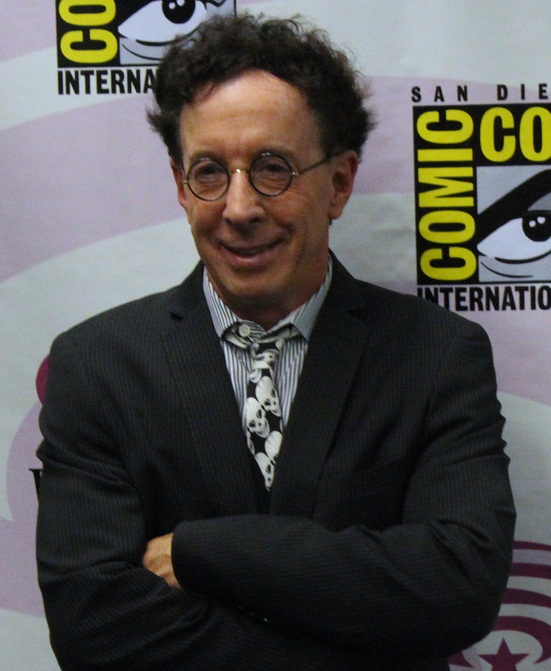
- Canton at the 2011 WonderCon
- Born: June 19, 1949 (age 77); Queens, New York City, U.S.
- Education: University of California
- Occupation: Film producer
- Years active: 1974–present
- Spouses: Alexandra Renee Scott Wendy Finerman
- Children: 3
- Relatives: Neil Canton (brother), Karen Finerman (former-sister-in-law)

Mark Canton (born June 19, 1949) is an American film producer and executive.

== Early life and education ==
Canton was born to a Jewish family in Queens, New York City, the son of Shirley and Arthur Canton, who worked in the film industry on marketing and publicity, including such films as Lawrence of Arabia. As a young adult, he met well-known movie personalities like Alfred Hitchcock, David Lean, and Doris Day when they visited the family's apartment.

After working in the mail room of Warner Bros. while studying at the University of California, Los Angeles, Canton started working for 20th Century Fox and later had jobs with film director Franklin Schaffner, with producer Jon Peters, and in the 1970s as executive assistant to Mike Medavoy at United Artists.

== Career ==
Canton worked as executive vice president at Warner Bros. from 1980 onwards. Successes he was involved in at the time include 1983's National Lampoon's Vacation, Purple Rain, and the Batman and Lethal Weapon film series, but also notorious box office failures like The Bonfire of the Vanities (1990), a picture he described as "the best movie I ever saw" at its first screening.

In 1991, Canton quit Warner Bros., where he was executive vice president of the Worldwide Motion Picture Production unit. Warner Bros. let him out of his contract fifteen months early, with studio head Bob Daly saying, "from our standpoint this was a job that was going to be eliminated." He then became chairman of Sony's Columbia Pictures (later Columbia-TriStar Pictures), where he was involved with some failures like Geronimo: An American Legend, but also with blockbusters such as Men in Black, Air Force One, and My Best Friend's Wedding.

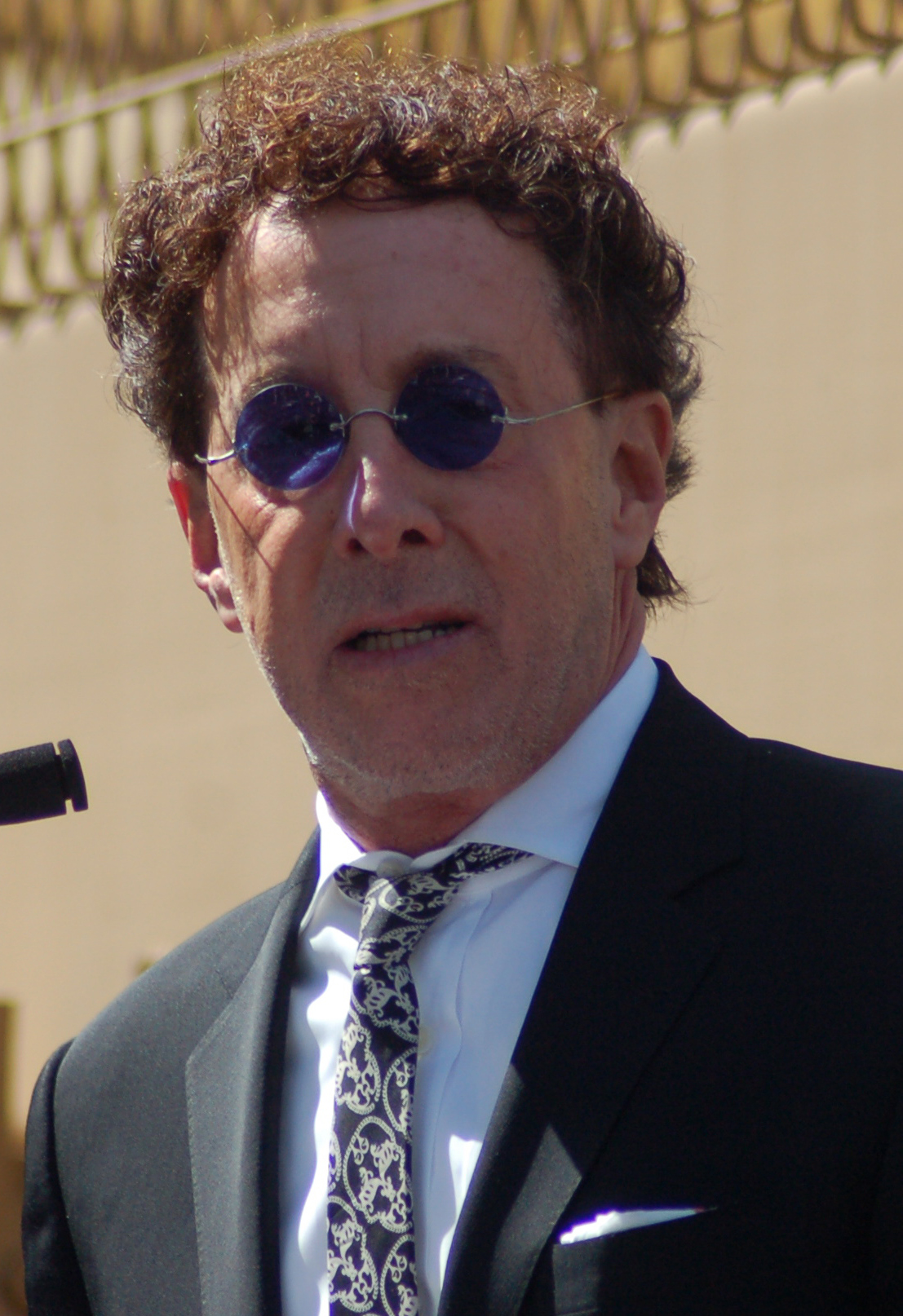
Canton in March 2010

Canton was fired by Sony in 1996, after a series of relative flops including Last Action Hero (a film Canton described as "probably the best action movie of all time") and The Cable Guy, before his final string of movies could become blockbusters. Described at the time as both "known for enthusiasm, rapid-fire talk, a sleek Italian wardrobe and a youthful style" and "a braggart who was lucky to have become chairman of a studio in the first place", Canton was in those years "one of the most powerful executives in Hollywood".

In 1998, Canton became an independent film producer, with Jack Frost starring Michael Keaton as his first major production. Backed by the German company Senator Entertainment from August 2000 onwards, he struck a first-look deal with Warner Bros. By the end of 2001, the shares of Senator had dropped substantially, and Canton had to close down his production company.

In 2002, he was the chief executive of Artists Production Group, the movie branch of Artist Management Group. After leaving APG in November 2003, he created Atmosphere Entertainment together with Mark Kimsey, an investment manager. The aims were to produce films and television programming. With this company, he produced blockbusters such as 300, Immortals, and The Spiderwick Chronicles.

In 2014, Canton co-created the show Power alongside Curtis '50 Cent' Jackson and Courtney Kemp, which earned numerous NAACP Image Awards, including multiple Outstanding Drama Series awards, National Film & Television Awards, People's Choice Awards, and BET Awards. This series was the number-one show on premium cable for its six-year run from 2014-2020.

In 2026, Canton joined forces with Peter Guber at Mandalay Entertainment as a managing partner for a new wave of feature films while continuing to develop television independently.

In his roles as executive, chairman, and producer, Canton has been involved in over 300 major Hollywood productions.

== Other activities and roles ==
As of 2023, Canton is a vice-president on the board of the Ischia Global Film & Music Festival, an international film festival held on the Italian island of Ischia.

== Personal life ==
Canton was married to Oscar-winning producer Wendy Finerman, with whom he has three children.

His brother is the film producer Neil Canton. They co-produced the 2000 film Get Carter.

== Filmography ==
He was a producer in all films unless otherwise noted.

=== Film ===
Year	Film	Credit	Award	Box Office
1980	Die Laughing			$4 million
1998	Jack Frost			$34.6 million
2000	Get Carter			$19.4 million
2000	Red Planet			$33.5 million
2001	Angel Eyes			$29.7 million
2002	Trapped	Executive producer		$13.4 million
2004	Taking Lives			$65.5 million
2004	Godsend	Executive producer		$30.1 million
2005	Land of the Dead		Nominated - Saturn Award for Best Horror Film; Nominated - Empire Award for Best Horror; Nominated - Fangoria - Best Wide Release Film; Nominated - Teen Choice Award for Choice Summer Movie	$47.8 million
2006	300		Saturn Award for Best Action or Adventure Film; Nominated - Empire Award for Best Sci-Fi/Fantasy; Nominated - MTV Movie Award for Best Movie; Nominated - MTV Russia Movie Award for Best International Movie; Nominated - National Movie Award for Best Action/Adventure; Nominated - People's Choice Award for Favorite Action Movie; Nominated - Satellite Award for Best Animated or Mixed Media Feature; Nominated - Teen Choice Award for Choice Movie – Action	$456.1 million
2007	Full of It			$500.000
2008	The Spiderwick Chronicles		Nominated - Saturn Award for Best Fantasy Film	$162.8 million
2009	A Perfect Getaway			$22.9 million
2009	Fame			$80.2 million
2010	Letters to Juliet		Nominated - Teen Choice Award for Choice Movie – Romance	$82.1 million
2010	Piranha 3D		Nominated - Dorian Award for Campy Film of the Year; Nominated - Scream Award for Best Horror Movie	$83.7 million
2010	Removal	Executive producer		
2011	Immortals		Nominated - Saturn Award for Best Fantasy Film	$226.9 million
2012	Rites of Passage			
2012	The Cold Light of Day	Executive producer		$25.4 million
2012	Black November	Executive producer		$35.000
2012	Piranha 3DD		Nominated - Teen Choice Award for Choice Movie: Horror	$8.5 million
2012	Freelancers	Executive producer		$370,000
2013	Escape Plan			$137.3 million
2014	300: Rise of an Empire			$337.6 million
2014	Cake			$2.9 million
2014	Outcast	Executive producer		$4.8 million
2014	The Pyramid			$16.9 million
2015	The Last Witch Hunter			$140.4 million
2016	Mr. Church			
2016	Burn Your Maps			
2016	The Comedian			
2017	The Yellow Birds			
2017	Phoenix Forgotten			
2018	Den of Thieves			
2018	Escape Plan 2: Hades			
2018	Nightmare Cinema			
2018	Final Score	Executive producer		
2019	After			
2019	Escape Plan: The Extractors			
2020	After We Collided			
2021	After We Fell			
2022	After Ever Happy			
2023	After Everything			
2024	Arthur the King			
2024	The Strangers: Chapter 1			
2025	Den of Thieves 2: Pantera			
2025	The Strangers – Chapter 2			
2025	Red Sonja			
2026	The Strangers – Chapter 3			
TBA	A.D.			
TBA	Black Belle			
TBA	Robot: Colony 25			
TBA	The Good Samaritan			

Production manager

Year	Film	Role	Box Office
1980	Caddyshack	Executive in charge of production	$39.8 million

Miscellaneous crew

Year	Film	Role
1974	The Taking of Pelham One Two Three	Production aide

Thanks

Year	Film	Role
2000	Preston Tylk	Thanks
2013	Getaway	Special thanks

=== Television ===
Year	Title	Credit	Award
1999−2001	Jack & Jill	Executive producer	
2014–20	Power	Executive producer	Nominated - NAACP Image Award for Outstanding Drama Series
2020	The Freak Brothers	Executive producer	
2020−21	Power Book II: Ghost	Executive producer	
2021	Power Book III: Raising Kanan	Executive producer	
2022	Power Book IV: Force	Executive producer	
2024	The Spiderwick Chronicles	Executive producer	
