= Ella Bruccoleri =

British actress

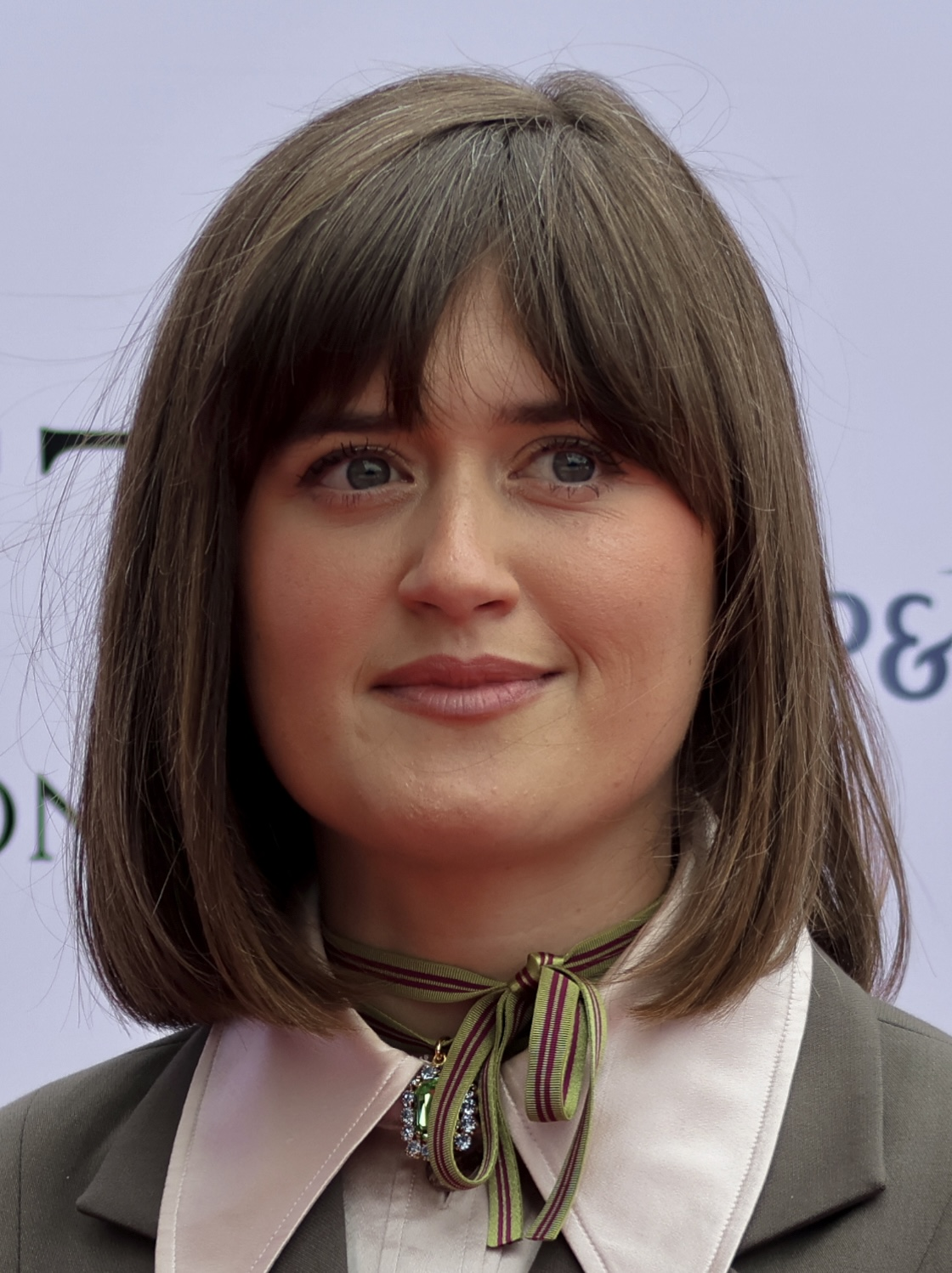
- Bruccoleri at the 2026 British Academy Television Awards
- Born: Ella May Bruccoleri; Scarborough, North Yorkshire, England
- Education: Oxford School of Drama
- Years active: 2018–present

Ella May Bruccoleri is a British actress and musician. On television, she is known for her roles as Sister Frances in the BBC One drama Call the Midwife (2018–2022) and as Mary Bennet in The Other Bennet Sister (2026).

== Early life ==
Bruccoleri was born to an Italian family and grew up in Scarborough. She graduated from the Oxford School of Drama in 2017. She has previously lived in Paris, where she attended a mime school.

== Career ==
=== Acting ===
Her television roles have included Call the Midwife, in which she played Sister Frances between 2018 and 2022, and Winifred Barragan in Bridgerton. She also had roles in television series Back to Life, The Chelsea Detective, and Hotel Portofino. She also co-runs a spoof influencer Instagram account, @etoztravel, with her comedy soulmate Zoe Dunn.

In 2023, she appeared as Rebecca in comedy super power series Extraordinary for Disney+. Later that year she was cast in Channel 4 romantic drama series Alice & Jack.

In 2024, she appeared in ITV drama Passenger, and BBC One mystery crime series Ludwig. Bruccoleri also appeared on the podcast Have You Got Your Sh*t Together? with host Caitlin O’Ryan.

Her film roles have included Polite Society, Joy, and The Strangers: Chapter 1, Chapter 2, and Chapter 3, in which she portrayed Jasmine who was also the masked stranger, Dollface, although most of her scenes were cut due to reshoots. In 2024, she was cast in a lead role in the British film Go Away! alongside Hugh Bonneville and Michael Socha. She also appeared in the Apple TV+ series Down Cemetery Road, and Mark Gatiss mystery drama Bookish, as well as the film Paddington in Peru.

In 2026, Bruccoleri starred as Mary Bennet in The Other Bennet Sister, airing on BBC iPlayer and BBC One. For her role in the series, she was nominated in the Drama Performance category at the 31st National Television Awards. She was also nominated for the 2027 TV Choice Awards in the category of Best Drama Performance. On November 3rd it was announced that Bruccoleri will be one of the 2026 BAFTA breakthrough participants.

=== Music ===
Alongside her acting career, Bruccoleri is the lead vocalist of the dream pop band Marry Me Emelie!, formed with musician Yoan Segot. The pair first met on the open-mic circuit in Paris before relocating to London, where they began their musical collaboration. Their work as a duo continued despite the end of their 13-year romantic relationship, with their debut recordings drawing directly on that experience.

In late 2024, Marry Me Emelie! independently released their debut single, "I Have a Lark," accompanied by a music video depicting a romantic relationship between a woman and a Eurasian skylark. Glide Magazine praised the track as a "spellbinding listen" and "a statement piece," adding that the band "sounds like veterans" and that their songwriting "quickly separates the band from their peers."

The duo released their debut EP, the distance makes the mountains blue, on 18 April 2025. An entirely bedroom-produced project, the EP takes its name from an Icelandic expression meaning that distance makes mountains appear more blue and men seem more mighty, and explores themes of deliberation, parting, and returning home. The release was accompanied by a sold-out show at Walthamstow Trades Hall in London, and the band received their first BBC Radio 2 play on Jo Whiley's show, with Edith Bowman sitting in and describing the music as "absolutely beautiful."

== Personal life ==
Bruccoleri was raised in an Italian Catholic family but became agnostic at 18.

== Filmography ==
=== Feature film ===
Year	Title	Role	Notes
2023	Polite Society	Alba	
2024	The Strangers: Chapter 1	Jasmine / Dollface	
2024	Joy	Lesley Brown	
2024	Paddington in Peru	Nun Rosita	
2025	Bank of Dave 2: The Loan Ranger	Zoe	
2025	The Strangers – Chapter 2	Jasmine / Dollface	
2026	The Strangers – Chapter 3	Jasmine / Dollface	
2026	Wicker	Bakerwoman	
TBA	Go Away!	Gemma	Filming

=== Short film ===
Year	Title	Role	Notes
2024	Quiet Life	Sophie	
2025	Settle	Alex Porter	Also producer
2025	Egg Timer	Megg	
2025	Jael Drives the Nail	Mara	
2026	Seams	Edie	In production

=== Television ===
Year	Title	Role	Notes
2018	Genius	Maid	Episode: "Picasso: Chapter 8"
2018	The Last Kingdom	Younger Nun	1 episode
2018–2022	Call the Midwife	Sister Frances	36 episodes
2021	All Creatures Great and Small	Anabel Dinsdale	Episode: "Semper Progrediens"
2021	Back to Life	Sharon	1 episode
2023	Extraordinary	Rebecca	Episode: "The Jen Show"
2023	Hotel Portofino	Joan	Episode: "Subterfuges"
2023	Alice & Jack	Louise	Episode: "1"
2023	The Chelsea Detective	Rena Friedman	Episode: "A Crime of Passion"
2024	Passenger	Ali Day	6 episodes
2024	Bridgerton	Miss Barragan	4 episodes
2024	Ludwig	Megan Rowlands	1 episode
2025	Suspect: The Shooting of Jean Charles de Menezes	Sarah	Episode: "The Whistleblower"
2025	Bookish	Merula Harkup	Episode: "Slightly Foxed"
2025	Down Cemetery Road	Nurse Steph	7 episodes
2026	Agatha Christie's Seven Dials	Socks	1 episode
2026	The Lady (TV series)	Angela	1 episode
2026	The Other Bennet Sister	Mary Bennet	10 episodes

=== Theatre ===
Year	Title	Role	Venues
2017(?)	Company	Amy	Oxford School of Drama
2017(?)	Romeo and Juliet	Juliet	Oxford School of Drama
2017(?)	Twelfth Night	Viola	Oxford School of Drama
2017	Closer	Alice	Oxford School of Drama
2017	Separate Tables	Anne	Oxford School of Drama
2017	Springstorm	Lila	The North Wall Arts Theatre
2017	Islanders	Winnie	Soho Theatre
2018(?)	ThisEgg	Flog	Camden People's Theatre
2019	The Noble Nine	Winnie	Theatre Tewl/ VAULT Festival
2026	The Virgins	Jess	Soho Theatre London
2026	The Other Place, After Antigone	Annie	Théâtre de la Ville Paris, Les Théâtres de Ville de Luxembourg, Comédie de Genève

=== Radio ===
Year	Title	Role	Producer
2017(?)	Setting a Glass	Ellie	Oxford School of Drama
2023	The Lusus Podcast	Tanya	BBC Sounds / Clarence Beeks / SISTER
2023	Eerie Podcast	Amber	Episode 2: "Sh*t your pants". Brock Media
2026	The Bacchae	Song	BBC 4 & BBC Sounds
