= Christopher Milburn =

English actor and producer

- Occupations: Actor, film producer
- Known for: An American Haunting, Getaway

Christopher Milburn is an English actor and producer.

== Career ==
He appeared in Casualty, as well the last two series of Rumpole of the Bailey as the title character's handsome colleague, Dave Inchcape.

He transitioned into film producing in the mid 1990s, debuting with the 1997 comedy Caught In The Act. He has since worked on both British and American productions, including An American Haunting and The Hurricane Heist. He has collaborated several times with filmmaker Courtney Solomon.

== Filmography (Producer) ==
- Dreaming of Joseph Lees (1999)
- Relative Values (2000)
- An American Haunting (2005)
- Perkins' 14 (2009)
- The Task (2011)
- Legendary (2013)
- Getaway (2013)
- Outcast (2014)
- The Hunter's Prayer (2017)
- The Hurricane Heist (2018)
- The Strangers: Chapter 1 (2024)
- The Strangers – Chapter 2 (2025)
- Tin Soldier (2025)
- The Strangers – Chapter 3 (2026)
