= Froy Gutierrez =

American actor and singer (born 1998)

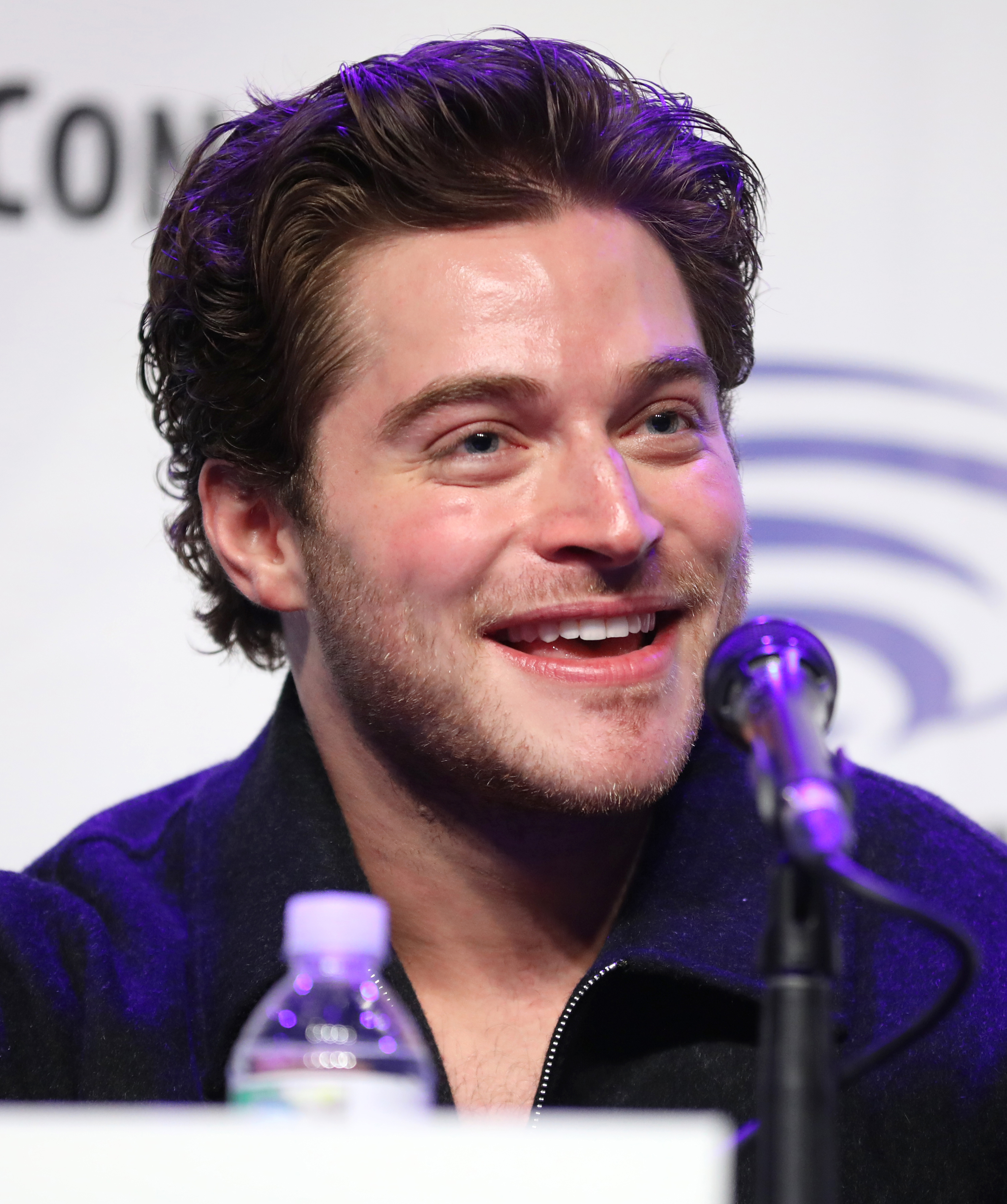
- Gutierrez at the 2024 WonderCon
- Born: April 27, 1998 (age 28); Highland Park, Texas, U.S.
- Occupations: Actor; singer
- Years active: 2015–present
- Musical career
- Genre: Pop
- Instrument: Vocals
- Label: Interscope

Froylán Gutierrez (born April 27, 1998) is an American actor and singer, known for playing Nolan Holloway in Teen Wolf and Jamie Henson in Cruel Summer. He is also known for his part as Ryan in the first instalment of an intended standalone trilogy, The Strangers: Chapter 1. Gutierrez released his first single, "Sideswipe", in 2018.

== Early life and education ==
Gutierrez was born and raised in Highland Park, Texas and attended Booker T. Washington High School for the Performing and Visual Arts. He is of Indigenous (Caxcan) and Mexican descent through his father. He grew up bilingual by learning both English and Spanish. After an agent saw him in a Dallas Children's Theater play, he began submitting audition tapes in 2015. He also experienced racist bullying and was part of a performance group at Planned Parenthood, where he worked on peer-to-peer outreach with other adolescents. "Growing up, I was surrounded by these very macho boys that would bully me," he explained. "I was afraid of them [...] I was attacked by them as a kid all the time".

== Career ==
After making his television debut in 2015 as Charlie in Nickelodeon's Bella and the Bulldogs, in 2017, Gutierrez appeared in the final season of Teen Wolf and on the first season of One Day at a Time. He was one of the two narrators in the audiobook version of Becky Albertalli and Adam Silvera's 2018 young adult LGBT romantic comedy What If It's Us and its 2022 sequel Here's To Us. In 2019, he was cast in the second season of Hulu's television series Light as a Feather. In 2021, he had his first series regular role as Jamie in Freeform's teen drama Cruel Summer. After that, Gutierrez appeared in several feature films, including the 2020 slasher film Initiation. In 2022, Gutierrez starred in Hocus Pocus 2, a sequel to the 1993 film Hocus Pocus. In 2023, Gutierrez starred in The Strangers: Chapter 1, directed by Renny Harlin.

== Personal life ==
Gutierrez came out as gay on August 7, 2023, when he and actor Zane Phillips announced their relationship on Instagram.

== Filmography ==
=== Film ===
Year	Title	Role
2017	A Cowgirl's Story	Jason
2018	The Vampyre	English man
2020	Initiation	Wes Scott
2022	Hocus Pocus 2	Mike
2024	The Strangers: Chapter 1	Ryan Perez
2025	The Strangers – Chapter 2	Ryan Perez
2025	This Is Not a Test	Rhys Moreno

=== Television ===
Year	Title	Role	Notes
2015–2016	Bella and the Bulldogs	Charlie Huggins	3 episodes
2016	The Goldbergs	Handsome Ben	2 episodes
2017	One Day at a Time	Josh Flores	4 episodes
2017	Teen Wolf	Nolan Holloway	Recurring role (season 6)
2018	Liza on Demand	Doug	Episode: "Popular"
2019	Light as a Feather	Ridge Reyes	Recurring role (season 2)
2020	Acting for a Cause	Antonio/Curio/Sir Andrew Aquecheek	Episode: "May 22, 2020"
2020	Wireless	Brad Carnegie	Main role
2021	Cruel Summer	Jamie Henson	Main role (season 1)
2025	I Love LA	Lukas Landry	2 episodes
2026	RuPaul's Drag Race	Himself	Episode: "Snatch Game of Love: Island Edition"
2026	The Rookie: North	Odell Chance	Main role

== Discography ==
=== Singles ===
Title	Year	Album
"Sideswipe"	2018	Non-album singles
"Fix Me"	2019	Non-album singles
"Crash"	2019	Non-album singles
"When It's Midnight"	2019	Non-album singles
