= Bryan Bertino =

American filmmaker (born 1977)

- Born: October 17, 1977 (age 48); Crowley, Texas, U.S.
- Occupations: Film director Film producer Screenwriter

Bryan Michael Bertino (born October 17, 1977) is an American filmmaker. He is best known as the writer/director of The Strangers (2008), as well as writing its sequel, The Strangers: Prey at Night (2018), with Ben Ketai.

== Early life and education ==
Bertino was born in Crowley, Texas. He studied cinematography at the University of Texas at Austin. He then moved to Los Angeles, where he worked as a gaffer, and wrote screenplays in his spare time.

== Career ==
Bertino submitted The Strangers for a Nicholl Fellowship with the Academy of Motion Picture Arts and Sciences, which reached the quarterfinals. However, he was able to get a meeting with Vertigo Entertainment. Bertino quit his job days before the script was sold to Universal Studios.

Mark Romanek wanted to direct The Strangers but demanded a $40 million budget. After speaking with Andrew Rona at Rogue Pictures, Bertino was asked to direct The Strangers despite a lack of directorial experience.

=== This Man ===
In 2010, Bertino announced he was working on the thriller or horror film This Man, which was being produced by Sam Raimi and his company Ghost House Pictures. The film is about a mysterious man's face appearing in the dreams of many individuals.

==== Concept ====
The film concept is built upon the internet meme that appeared in October 2009, with the launching of the website ThisMan.org. The site claimed that the first recorded sighting of the individual was in 2006 to an anonymous mental patient and that others throughout the world have seen This Man in their dreams. Shortly after the website launch, it was revealed that the website and meme were created by sociologist Andrea Natella, an advertising agency employee who specialized in hoax and viral marketing, and that the face used on the website appeared to have been produced through the software program Flash Face.

==== Production ====
ThisMan.org was purchased in May 2010 by Ghost House Pictures, who announced that they were writing and directing a film about This Man, with Bertino contracted as writer/director. Though Bertino worked on other projects, This Man has not been mentioned since then.

== Filmography ==
Year	Title	Director	Writer	Producer
2008	The Strangers	Yes	Yes	No
2014	Mockingbird	Yes	Yes	Yes
2015	The Blackcoat's Daughter	No	No	Yes
2016	The Monster	Yes	Yes	Yes
2017	Stephanie	No	No	Yes
2018	He's Out There	No	No	Yes
2018	The Strangers: Prey at Night	No	Yes	Executive
2020	The Dark and the Wicked	Yes	Yes	Yes
2024	The Strangers: Chapter 1	No	Story	No
2025	Vicious	Yes	Yes	No
