= Magic Stone Productions =

Magic Stone is a film and television production company directed by husband-and-wife team Michael Stephenson and Lindsay Stephenson. Magic Stone Productions operates from its headquarters at 12400 Ventura Blvd, Studio City, California.

== Overview ==
Magic Stone Productions is a Los Angeles based film and tv production company, launched in 2009. Magic Stone is a production company whose films include Best Worst Movie and The American Scream, two award-winning feature documentaries that rose to critical and commercial success. Most recently, Magic Stone executive produced Zero Charisma, an indie comedy that won the 'Audience Award' in the 2013 SXSW festival.

In 2013, Magic Stone announced it would produce Bob Odenkirk's feature Girlfriend's Day. Odenkirk, who penned the script, starred in the 2017 film and Michael Paul Stephenson directed. Amber Tamblyn also starred. Magic Stone is also in development on Destroy, a fast-paced dark comedy.

== Filmography ==
- Best Worst Movie (2009)
- The American Scream (2012)
- Zero Charisma (2013)
- Girlfriend's Day (2017)
- Destroy (TBA)
