= Neil Hopkins =

American television and film actor (born 1977)

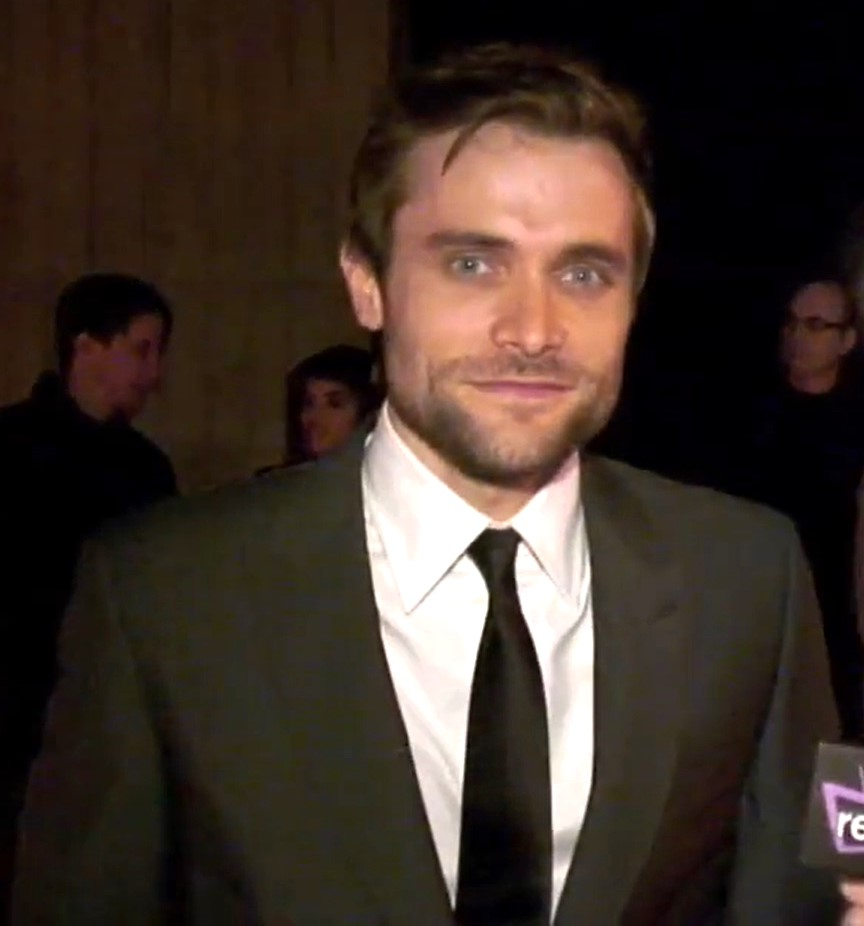
- Hopkins in 2010
- Born: Neil Edward Hopkins; May 13, 1977 (age 49); Trenton, New Jersey, U.S.
- Education: College of the Holy Cross (BA); American Conservatory Theater (MFA)
- Years active: 2002–present
- Spouse: Saba Homayoon (m. 2007)
- Children: 2

Neil Edward Hopkins (born May 13, 1977) is an American television and film actor. He is a trained actor and singer, best known for his portrayal of Charlie's heroin-addicted brother Liam on Lost.

== Early life and education ==
Hopkins was born in Trenton, New Jersey. Later, he and his family moved to Aurora, Colorado, where he graduated from Regis Jesuit High School in 1995. He then attended the College of the Holy Cross in Worcester, Massachusetts, from 1996 to 1999. He is a graduate of the American Conservatory Theater's MFA program.

== Career ==
Hopkins has portrayed characters in several television shows including a "Specialist" in Birds of Prey, "Lester" in Crossing Jordan, and has had appearances in Dragnet, Charmed, Navy NCIS: Naval Criminal Investigative Service, My Name Is Earl, Point Pleasant and Ghost Whisperer. Hopkins has also starred in an episode of CSI: Crime Scene Investigation as "Donny Drummer" and had a recurring role on Lost as Charlie's older brother and former heroin addict Liam Pace. He also made appearances in two episodes of Big Love as "Ken Byington" and in an episode of The 4400 as "Nick Crowley". Hopkins plays musicians in several series, appearing as a rock star in The 4400 and Lost, and as a promising musician on Ghost Whisperer.

As well as his television appearances, Hopkins has also had roles in feature films, such as main character Chris in Philip Zlotorynski's Walkentalk, and a guest role in My Big Fat Independent Movie, as the "Lanky Man". In both films, Hopkins did an impersonation of Christopher Walken, a skill he is known for.

Hopkins has also appeared in Aimée Price as "Kevin" and in the 2005 remake of the silent film The Cabinet of Dr. Caligari as "Alan". He also starred in the film Because I Said So as "Rafferty", which was released in 2007.

He co-wrote, co-produced and co-starred in the pilot Hit Factor, which took the Best Drama award at the New York Television Festival (NYTVF) in New York City. Hopkins also starred in the Brothers Strause science fiction thriller Skyline.

In 2020, Hopkins was cast in a recurring role on DC Universe's Stargirl as supervillain Lawrence 'Crusher' Crock, also known as Sportsmaster during the shows first and second season (where it moved to The CW). In 2021, Hopkins was upped to a series regular for the third and final season.

== Filmography ==
=== Film ===
Year	Title	Role	Notes
2005	My Big Fat Independent Movie	Lanky Man	
2005	The Cabinet of Dr. Caligari	Alan	
2010	Skyline	Ray	
2011	Losing Control	Scott Foote	
2013	Detour	Jackson	Also co-producer
2019	Portals	Adam / Mirror Adam	Segment "The Other Side"

=== Television ===
Year	Title	Role	Notes
2002	Birds of Prey	Specialist	Guest role
2003	Crossing Jordan	Lester Corrigan	Guest role
2003	Dragnet	Bella Dawson	Guest role
2004	Charmed	Sarpedon	Guest role
2004	NCIS	Jeremy Davison	Guest role
2004-2010	Lost	Liam Pace	Recurring; 6 episodes
2005	Point Pleasant	Preston Hodges	Guest role
2005	CSI: Crime Scene Investigation	Donny Drummer	Guest role
2006	Big Love	Ken Byington	2 episodes
2006	The 4400	Nick Crowley	Guest role
2006	Ghost Whisperer	Brandon Roth	Guest role
2007	Dirty Sexy Money	Norman Exley	Guest role
2007	Shark	Garrett Blake	Guest role
2008	Terminator: The Sarah Connor Chronicles	Mr. Harris	Guest role
2008	Women's Murder Club	Andy McCarthy	Guest role
2008	Hit Factor	Chase Lucas	TV Movie; executive produce and writer
2008	The Cleaner	Teddy Souplos	Guest role
2008	Criminal Minds	Angel Maker	Guest role
2008	CSI: NY	Yert Yallawac	Guest role
2009	My Name Is Earl	Zeke	Guest role
2009	Crash	Kieran	2 episodes
2009	Nip/Tuck	Brendan McNamara	Guest role
2010	Castle	Ted Carter	Guest role
2010	CSI: Miami	Steve Raymer	Guest role
2011	True Blood	Claude Crane	Guest role
2011	Femme Fatales	Charles Soloman	Guest role
2012	Bones	Kevin Silver	Guest role
2012	Grimm	Ian Harmon	Guest role
2012	Leverage	James Kanack	Guest role
2012	The Mentalist	Isaac Goodwin	Guest role
2013	Necessary Roughness	Jimmy	Guest role
2013	Witches of East End	Doug	2 episodes
2014	Matador	Noah Peacott	Main role; 13 episodes
2015	The Good Wife	Vince Dalton	Guest role
2015-2016	Code Black	Gary	2 episodes
2016	CSI: Cyber	Jared Atchley	Guest role
2018	For the People	Carl Wayne Clarke	Guest role
2020-2022	Stargirl	Lawrence 'Crusher' Crock /Sportsmaster	Recurring (Season 1-2) Main role (Season 3) 16 episodes
2024	The Rookie	Eric Ramsey	Guest role
