= Best Worst Movie =

2009 American film

- Theatrical release cover
- Directed by: Michael Stephenson
- Written by: Michael Stephenson
- Produced by: Lindsay Stephenson; Brad Klopman; Jim Klopman; Michael Stephenson
- Starring: Michael Stephenson; George Hardy; Jason F. Wright; Darren Ewing; Jason Steadman; Claudio Fragasso
- Cinematography: Katie Graham; Carl Indriago
- Edited by: Katie Graham; Andrew Matthews
- Music by: Bobby Tahouri
- Production company: Magic Stone Productions
- Distributed by: Magicstone Productions; New Video Group
- Release dates: March 14, 2009 (SXSW); November 16, 2010 (DVD)
- Running time: 93 minutes
- Country: United States
- Language: English

Best Worst Movie is a 2009 American documentary film about the making of the infamous 1990 horror film Troll 2 and its subsequent resurgence as a cult film. Directed by Michael Stephenson, the child star of Troll 2, the film was distributed by Magic Stone Productions and New Video Group. It was also included in the first 5,000 copies of Scream Factory's Blu-ray double feature of Troll and Troll 2, released on November 17, 2015.

The film premiered at the South by Southwest festival in March 2009, and was released on DVD in November 2010. It debuted to positive critical reception.

== Synopsis ==
Almost twenty years after the critically panned film Troll 2 was released, the cast and crew are followed in this documentary to see how they handle the new life that the movie has been given. Fans gather to celebrate the movie at screenings.

Director of the documentary Michael Stephenson, who played the young boy in Troll 2, interviews many of the former cast and crew. Although many consider Troll 2 to be one of the worst movies ever made, many fans have had parties, annual screenings, and found joy in watching the unintended humor of the movie.

The documentary follows the lead actor of Troll 2, George Hardy, a dentist living in his hometown in Alabama, where he is well-liked by people around him and embraces the role he had in the movie. He is seen trying to convince his neighbors to attend a local screening of the film and goes to conventions. He mentions that if he could have chosen to be an actor or a dentist, he would have been an actor, as he did not mind the spotlight.

Claudio Fragasso, director of Troll 2, is also featured discussing what he intended this film to become. He is happy to see the cult following that his original film has achieved, but he fails to understand why fans of the movie laughed at scenes that were not intended to be funny. When asked why the film was called "Troll 2" when there were no trolls in the film, he initially does not understand the question, and after being told that the creatures in the film are called goblins, he scoffs at the question. Although Fragasso is made aware that his film is considered poorly made, he is glad it has had an impression on its viewers.

Other actors of the cast and crew do Q&A sessions with fans of the film. Some joke that they had never read the entire script when their parts were filmed. Others say that they never knew what kind of movie they were filming. Margo Prey, who played the wife of Hardy's character in Troll 2, was interviewed but did not want to go to the local screening of the film because of how "complicated" it would have been. More former cast members were interviewed at their homes to discuss their thoughts on the film and what the film has become since the production.

In the end, Hardy stated that he would do Troll 3 if he were asked to do so. During the credits, it was noted that Fragasso was writing his next film Troll 2: Part 2.

== Cast ==
- Michael Stephenson
- George Hardy
- Lily Hardy
- Pita Ray
- Micki Knox
- Tommy Bice
- Lila Graves
- Laura Gulledge
- Merry Hardy
- Barbara H. Young
- Emily Booth
- Claudio Fragasso
- Peter Kuplowsky

== Production ==
After completing and watching Troll 2, Stephenson became embarrassed by the film; however, thanks to Myspace, he began to realize that the film had gained a cult following and was often listed alongside favorite movies of users on the site. According to Stephenson, the turning point came in April 2006: "I woke up one morning with a really warm feeling and I was smiling ear to ear. I was next to my wife and I said, 'I am the child star of the worst movie ever made... there's a story here'".

Not all participants in Troll 2 were eager to revisit the film. Stephenson noted that he had trouble convincing actors Don Packard and Connie Young to be included in the project, although he was eventually able to convince both to appear in it.

== Release ==
The film premiered at the South by Southwest festival in March 2009, and was released on DVD in November 2010.

== Reception ==
Best Worst Movie received positive reviews. On the review aggregator website Rotten Tomatoes, 94% of 71 critics' reviews are positive. The website's consensus reads: "Good-natured and mirthful, Best Worst Movie is a sweet deconstruction of how a cinematic folly can become a triumph." Metacritic, which uses a weighted average, assigned the film a score of 61 out of 100, based on 15 critics, indicating "generally favorable" reviews.

Roger Ebert awarded Best Worst Movie three out of four stars. The A.V. Club gave the film a "B" rating.

=== Accolades ===
Award	Category	Subject	Result
Denver Film Critics Society Award	Best Documentary Film		Nominated
Fantasia International Film Festival	Best Documentary	Michael Stephenson	Won
Sitges Film Festival	New Visions Award for Non Fiction Motion Picture Diploma	Michael Stephenson	Won
Telly Award	Silver Telly — TV Programs, Segments, or Promotional Pieces - Sound/Sound Design	Woody Woodhall	Won

== See also ==
- Room Full of Spoons
- The Disaster Artist
