= Michael Stephenson (filmmaker) =

American actor and filmmaker

Michael Paul Stephenson
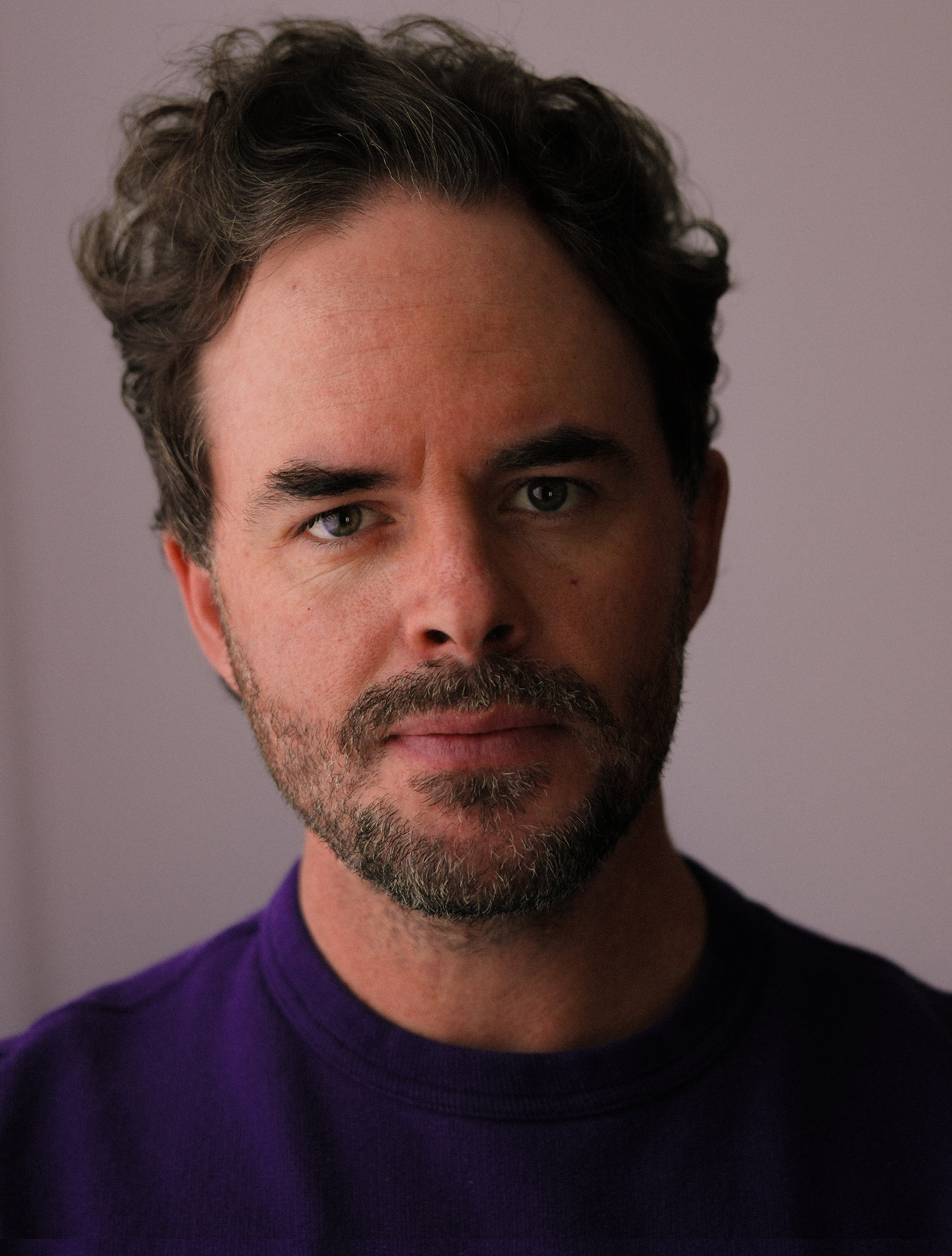
- Born: 1978 (age 47–48); Galveston, Texas, U.S.
- Occupations: Actor; director; producer; writer
- Years active: 1983–present
- Spouse: Lindsay Rowles Stephenson
- Children: 3

Michael Stephenson (born 1978), known professionally as Michael Paul Stephenson, is an American filmmaker and actor. He is known for directing the critically acclaimed documentaries Best Worst Movie and The American Scream. Stephenson made his narrative feature debut with Girlfriend’s Day, starring Bob Odenkirk. Stephenson's latest film, Attack of the Murder Hornets, is an original documentary that he directed and produced for Discovery+. He is a member of the Directors Guild of America.

== Career ==
=== 1983–2005: Early career ===
Stephenson's career in the entertainment industry started at the age of 8 when he was discovered by a talent agent while acting in his school's rendition of Peter Pan. When he was 10 years old, he auditioned for the horror film Troll 2, and got the starring role. Throughout his younger years, Stephenson spent most of his time writing stories and making skateboarding films. Early in his career, Stephenson worked as a cinematographer with director Mel Stuart. As a writer, Stephenson was a beneficiary of the American Gem Screenplay Award for his screenplay Orange.

=== 2009–present ===
Stephenson co-founded a production company with his wife Lindsay Stephenson, Magic Stone Productions, in 2009.

In 2009, Stephenson produced and directed Best Worst Movie, a documentary about Troll 2 and its cult status. The film launched on March 14, 2009, at the Alamo Drafthouse South Lamar in Austin, Texas, as part of the South by Southwest film festival. ABC's Nightline ran a segment on Troll 2 and Best Worst Movie in May 2010, including interviews with Hardy and Stephenson.

In 2012, Stephenson produced and directed his second feature documentary, The American Scream, for NBC Universal's Chiller network.The American Scream premiered on October 28, 2012. Stephenson is also the Executive Producer of Zero Charisma, a comedy directed by Katie Graham and editor Andrew Matthews. Zero Charisma won the audience award at the SXSW film festival in 2013.

In 2017, Stephenson made his narrative feature debut with the dark comedy Girlfriend's Day, starring Bob Odenkirk. The film premiered worldwide on February 14 on Netflix.

Stephenson's most recent film, Attack of the Murder Hornets, is an original documentary that he produced and directed for Discovery+. The film was released worldwide on February 20, 2021.

== Personal life ==
Stephenson lives in Los Angeles with his wife Lindsay Stephenson, who is also his producing partner.

== Select filmography ==
=== As actor ===
Year	Title	Role
1990	Troll 2	Joshua Waits
1990	Beyond Darkness	Martin
1990	Encyclopedia Brown (TV series)	Deeter Cross
1992	The Bulkin Trail (TV movie)	Nick Jackson
1992	Miracles & Other Wonders (TV series)	Michael
1996	The Paper Brigade	Luke
1998	Before He Wakes (TV movie)	Jordan
2001	The Penalty Box	Luke
2001	Touched by an Angel	Jordan (uncredited)
2009	Best Worst Movie (documentary)	Self
2010	That Movie Show (TV series)	Self
2010	Scream Awards 2010 (TV special)	Self
2010	Last Call with Carson Daly	Self

=== As filmmaker ===
Year	Title	Credit as			
Year	Title	Director	Producer	Writer	Notes
2009	Kids with Cameras (documentary)			Yes	Cinematographer
2009	Best Worst Movie (documentary)	Yes	Yes	Yes	
2012	The American Scream (documentary)	Yes	Yes	Yes	
2013	Zero Charisma		Yes		
2017	Girlfriend's Day	Yes			Netflix
2021	Attack of the Murder Hornets (documentary)	Yes	Yes	Yes	Discovery+
