= Michelle Pierce =

American actress

- Born: Michelle Pierce; July 22, 1981 (age 44); Palo Alto, California, United States
- Occupation: Actress
- Years active: 2004–present
- Spouse: Christian Kasparian (2019-present) 1 child)

Michelle Pierce is an American actress.

== Life and career ==
Pierce was born in Palo Alto, California. She has two sisters and one brother. Her great-grandmother was Helen Bray, star of many silent films during the early 20th century.

Pierce attended UCLA, and after graduating, landed roles on series such as CSI: NY and recurring roles on the soap opera Days of Our Lives. She has also appeared in Desperate Housewives, Criminal Minds, CSI: Miami, and Rules of Engagement, among others. She also had a small role on the 2007 blockbuster Transformers.

In 2009, she starred on the Rules of Engagement episode "Jeff's New Friend" as Amanda, Russell's new girlfriend. Russell sees a photo of her mother, with whom he had a one-night stand. He does not know if Amanda is his daughter until he gets the results of the DNA test back.

On March 2, 2010, Pierce made her debut as a recurring character on CBS’s show NCIS, playing the girlfriend (later fiancée and then wife) of series co-star Brian Dietzen’s character Jimmy Palmer. Her character, Breena, was referenced as having died of COVID-19 during a season-18 episode (Episode 7), which aired February 9, 2021, leaving Jimmy to care for their daughter.

Pierce also has a role in the 2013 horror film The Monkey's Paw. The film is based on the W.W. Jacobs short story, and also stars Stephen Lang, C.J. Thomason, Corbin Bleu, and Charles S. Dutton. The film was released in theaters and on demand on October 8, 2013.
