= Girlfriend's Day =

- Official poster
- Directed by: Michael Stephenson
- Written by: Bob Odenkirk; Philip Zlotorynski; Eric Von Hoffman
- Produced by: Bob Odenkirk; Marc Provissiero; M. Elizabeth Hughes; Bryan DeGuire
- Starring: Bob Odenkirk; Amber Tamblyn; Rich Sommer; Natasha Lyonne; Toby Huss; Andy Richter; Stacy Keach
- Cinematography: Richard Wong
- Edited by: Terel Gibson
- Music by: Bobby Tahouri
- Production companies: Magic Stone Productions; Odenkirk Provissiero Entertainment
- Distributed by: Netflix
- Release date: February 14, 2017 (United States)
- Running time: 70 minutes
- Country: United States
- Language: English

Girlfriend's Day is a 2017 American comedy-drama film directed by Michael Paul Stephenson and written by Bob Odenkirk, Philip Zlotorynski, and Eric Hoffman. The film stars Odenkirk and Amber Tamblyn and was released on Netflix on February 14, 2017.

== Plot ==
Ray Wentworth works as a greeting card writer in California, for one of two companies owned by members of the same family. Once a celebrated romance card creator, his divorce leaves him with depression and writer's block, and he is fired.

Going to the bar he frequents, Ray runs into Taft, a former colleague who's transitioned into writing a novel, although essentially also with writer's block. Attributing his difficulty to his marriage, he points out that Ray's divorced status opens him up to inspiration from 'the chase'.

Three months later, California's governor declares a new holiday, Girlfriend's Day, which includes a contest to produce the best greeting card to commemorate it. Ray's former boss Stuyvesant hopes Ray can recapture his old magic and hires him under the table to create a card good enough to win the contest. Only amateurs and unemployed professionals are eligible to participate.

Looking for inspiration, Ray comes across Jill, a woman he'd met in the bar the past evening. She works in a shop that sells greeting cards and they seem to have similar views. Afterwards, on a walk together, Jill kisses Ray.

In high spirits, that evening Ray returns to his old office, sneaking in through the back as Stuyvesant has suggested. He's retrieving his old notebooks when he hears some sounds in the presses area. He finds Taft, bleeding out from a stab wound, before getting knocked out from behind. Waking up on the sofa at home, he faces homicide detective Miller. The officer blackmails him, threatening to turn in evidence that Ray killed Taft if he doesn't write him a card he can give his girlfriend.

Ray then becomes involved in a tangle of deceit and murder as the rival companies fight to win the contest, the profits and prestige that will come with the victory. He goes to the bar, where everyone is talking about Taft. He's on his way out when Jill enters, and she gives him her number.

At Taft's funeral Ray learns that both AAAAA Greetings and Paper Hearts are owned by Gundys, Robert and Dillon. Taft had been working for Paper Hearts. Robert has Ray taken to his mansion. He pressures him, admitting that both Stuyvesant and Miller are on his payroll, and suggests he continue to pursue Jill.

Ray goes to Jill's eclectic house and they become intimate. Inspired, he writes the card then tells Stuyvesant he'll only give it to his muse. After Jill reads it and sheds a tear, Miller comes out of the shadows. He reads it, and smugly states that they knew they'd get it one way or another.

Ray burns the card, so two more of Robert's thugs take him and Jill to their remote place. They are in the process of torturing him when Robert arrives. It is revealed that Jill was coerced into manipulating Ray as he's taken her daughter, his nephew's offspring, into his care.

When Ray still refuses to give up the card, Robert prepares to kill Jill so he can personally raise her daughter in as his own heir to the company in an upper class setting, stating that it is what she deserves, but as he is about to shoot her, one of Robert's thugs, Beecher, incapacitates him by shooting him in the shoulder, saying “Nobody’s better’n nobody”.

Forfeiting the card in the end, and it ends up becoming extremely successful. Ray gave up card writing, opting to move to the suburbs and teach drivers ed.

== Cast ==
- Bob Odenkirk as Raymond "Ray" Wentworth
- Amber Tamblyn as Jill
- Rich Sommer as Buddy
- Toby Huss as Betcher
- David Sullivan as Sonnyboy
- Hannah Nordberg as Liz
- June Diane Raphael as Karen Lamb
- Stacy Keach as Robert Gundy
- Andy Richter as Harold Lamb
- Larry Fessenden as Taft
- Natasha Lyonne as Mrs. Taft
- Alex Karpovsky as Styvesan
- Stephanie Courtney as Cathy Gile
- Echo Kellum as Madsen
- Steven Michael Quezada as Munoz
- David Lynch as Narrator

== Production ==
On June 4, 2013, it was announced that Bob Odenkirk would write and star as Ray, a greeting cards writer, in the comedy-drama film Girlfriend's Day, which would be directed by Michael Stephenson. Michael and Lindsay Stephenson would produce the film through their Magic Stone Productions along with Odenkirk and Marc Provissiero through their Odenkirk Provissiero Entertainment. On September 17, 2013, Amber Tamblyn joined the film to play a fan of greeting card writers. On November 23, 2015, Netflix acquired global distribution rights for the film, which was also co-written by Philip Zlotorynski and Eric Hoffman, and also produced by M. Elizabeth Hughes.

Principal photography on the film began on November 30, 2015, in Los Angeles.

== Release ==
The film was released worldwide on February 14, 2017.

=== Critical response ===
The film received mixed reviews from critics, where the review aggregator website Rotten Tomatoes, the film holds an approval rating of 43% with an average 5.6/10. On February 15, 2017, Paste magazine gave the film an 8.0 rating (out of 10).
