= Rise of the Tomb Raider =

2015 video game

- Developer: Crystal Dynamics (Note: Xbox 360 version developed by Nixxes Software)
- Publishers: Microsoft Studios; Square Enix (Note: Feral Interactive published the game's Linux and Mac versions. Aspyr published the Nintendo Switch 2 version.)
- Directors: Noah Hughes; Brian Horton; Daniel Neuburger
- Producer: Rose Hunt
- Designers: Jason Botta; Michael Brinker
- Programmers: Scott Krotz; Steve Austin
- Artists: Brenoch Adams; Wilson Mui
- Writer: Rhianna Pratchett
- Composer: Bobby Tahouri
- Series: Tomb Raider
- Platforms: Xbox 360; Xbox One; Windows; PlayStation 4; macOS; Linux; Stadia; Nintendo Switch 2
- Release: November 10, 2015: Xbox 360, Xbox One; NA: November 10, 2015; AU: November 10, 2015; EU: November 13, 2015 Windows; WW: January 28, 2016 PlayStation 4; WW: October 11, 2016 macOS; WW: April 12, 2018 Linux; WW: April 19, 2018 Stadia; WW: November 19, 2019 Nintendo Switch 2; WW: June 9, 2026
- Genre: Action-adventure
- Mode: Single-player

Rise of the Tomb Raider is a 2015 action-adventure game developed by Crystal Dynamics and published by Microsoft Studios and Square Enix. The game is the eleventh main entry in the Tomb Raider series, the sequel to 2013's Tomb Raider, and is the second instalment in the Survivor trilogy. Its story follows Lara Croft as she ventures into Siberia in search of the legendary city of Kitezh while battling the paramilitary organization Trinity, which intends to uncover the city's promise of immortality. Lara must traverse the environment and combat enemies with firearms and stealth as she explores semi-open hubs. In these hubs she can raid challenge tombs to unlock new rewards, complete side missions, and scavenge for resources which can be used to craft useful materials.

Development of Rise of the Tomb Raider closely followed the conclusion of development of the 2013 reboot. Player feedback was considered during development, with the team reducing the number of quick time events and introducing more puzzles and challenge tombs. The team traveled to several locations in Turkey, including Cappadocia, Istanbul and Ephesus, to design Kitezh. Rhianna Pratchett returned as the game's writer while Bobby Tahouri replaced Jason Graves as the game's composer. The story of the game was designed to be more personal, and the team was inspired by a number of movies while creating the game. Camilla Luddington returned to provide voice and motion-capture work for Lara. Powered by the Foundation engine, the game was also developed by Eidos-Montréal and Nixxes Software.

Rise of the Tomb Raider was announced at E3 2014 by Microsoft Studios. The game was revealed to be a timed exclusive for Xbox 360 and Xbox One at Gamescom the same year, which sparked criticism from the gaming press and community. It was released for Xbox 360 and Xbox One in November 2015. A Windows version was released in January 2016, and a PlayStation 4 version in October. The game was acclaimed by critics, with praise for its graphics, gameplay, characterization, and abundance of content. It had sold 11.8 million units worldwide by November 2021, and was nominated for several end-of-year accolades. Crystal Dynamics also released several downloadable content packs for the game. A sequel, Shadow of the Tomb Raider, was released in September 2018.

== Gameplay ==
Rise of the Tomb Raider is a third-person action-adventure game in which players control Lara Croft, who is on a quest to discover the legendary city of Kitezh. Combat is a major gameplay mechanic; Lara has a large variety of weapons at her disposal (including assault rifles, shotguns, and pistols), some of which have an alternate firing mode. Players may also utilize stealth to progress through portions of the game, using bows and arrows to take out enemies, creating distractions to draw enemy attention away from Lara, or hiding in bushes to evade enemies. Lara can use the environment to fight enemies, shooting explosive barrels, tearing down rope-wrapped structures with rope arrows, or ambushing enemies from high ground. She can also use her ice axe and combat knife to engage in melee combat with enemies. Completing objectives and side content and eliminating enemies give players experience points (XP). When players collect sufficient XP they level up, receiving a skill point, which can be spent on the game's three skill trees: Brawler, Hunter and Survivor. Brawler enhances Lara's efficiency with weapons, giving her abilities such as retrieving arrows from corpses and a steady aim, as well as boosting her resilience against attack and unlocks new combat skills, such as dodge kill. Hunter gives her an advantage when dealing with the environments and animals. Survivor covers a wide range of skills such as creating incendiary bombs and setting booby traps. Lara learns new languages, enabling her to discover relics (such as coins) which can be traded for new equipment.

Lara Croft explores one of the game's challenge tombs, which contains an ice ship.

The game has semi-open hubs for players to explore. In the hubs are items for Lara to collect, including crafting materials and survival caches. These items and collectibles such as relics and documents can be revealed to players using Survival Instinct, a vision mode which highlights items of interest. By collecting the materials, players can craft items with the game's crafting menu; Lara can craft ammunition, poisoned arrows (using death-cap mushrooms), and Molotov cocktails and hand grenades from cans and bottles. The open areas are filled with wildlife, which can be hunted to collect more resources. Players can discover and explore challenge tombs for new skills and outfits. Lara's outfit, which affects her combat performance, can be changed at base camps. The camps allow Lara to change her weapon loadouts, and are fast travel points which allow players to explore a previously-searched area. The game has side missions and challenges which may give players new equipment, and players navigate intricate environments to progress. Lara can use her ice axe to climb certain surfaces (such as cliffs and glaciers) and her rope arrows to create ziplines to access difficult-to-reach areas, and can climb trees and swim. Players solve puzzles during the game, in its main campaign and optional content. The puzzles, based on in-game physics, often connect; players must solve connecting puzzles to solve a larger one.

Unlike the 2013 Tomb Raider reboot, Rise of the Tomb Raider lacks a multiplayer mode. It introduces Expeditions, which allow players to replay the game with new constraints and requirements. The game has four modes: Chapter Replay, Chapter Replay Elite, Score Attack, and Remnant Resistance. Chapter Replay and Chapter Replay Elite allow players to replay any level, and Elite allows them to bring already-acquired skills and weapons to the level. Score Attack introduces score combo chains to the game. Remnant Resistance allows players to create custom scenarios, which can be shared with other players. By completing Expeditions, players earn credits which can then be used to purchase digital collectible cards to modify the gameplay. Common cards may be used only once, and foil cards can be used repeatedly. The cards can also be purchased in microtransactions.

== Plot ==
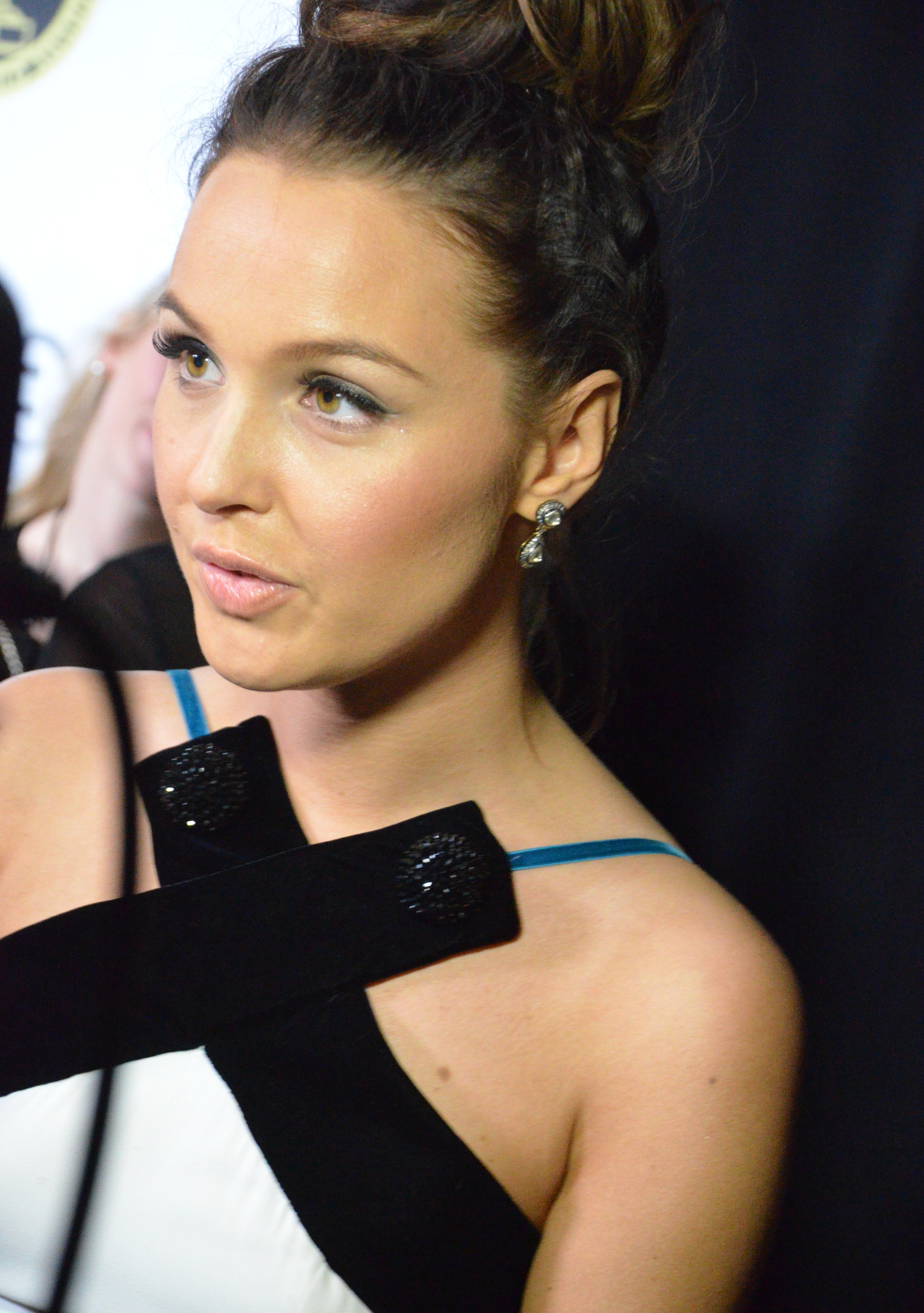
Camilla Luddington provided the voice and motion capture for Lara Croft in Rise of the Tomb Raider.

A year after the events of Tomb Raider, archaeologist Lara Croft is struggling to explain her experience of the supernatural on Yamatai and is experiencing PTSD. Looking for answers, she turns to her late father Lord Croft's research on the lost city of Kitezh and the promise of immortality. Ana, Lord Croft's partner, warns Lara that her father's obsession drove him to ruin and suicide. Lara ignores her and organizes an expedition to the Forgotten Cities in northwestern Syria, hoping to uncover the tomb of the Prophet of Constantinople, a key figure in the Kitezh legend. The tomb is empty, and Lara is interrupted by Trinity—an ancient order of knights turned paramilitary organization investigating the supernatural—and their task force leader, Konstantin. As she flees, Lara discovers a symbol etched into the tomb, which she links to a book on Russian religious history in her father's study at Croft Manor. She learns of an artifact called the Divine Source, said to be capable of granting immortality. After arguing with her friend Jonah Maiava regarding the artifact's existence, a Trinity assassin infiltrates the manor and steals the book, prompting the two to go to Siberia.

In Siberia, Lara and Jonah are separated by an avalanche while ascending a mountain. Continuing alone, Lara discovers that Trinity has transformed a Soviet-era installation into a base of operations in their search for Kitezh. She is caught trying to retrieve the book and is imprisoned with Ana. Konstantin slowly strangles Ana in an attempt to force Lara into revealing what she knows. Upon realizing Lara does not know the whereabouts of the source, Ana reveals herself as a Trinity agent and that Konstantin is her brother. She asks Lara to join Trinity, but she refuses and is taken to the Gulag cells, where she meets a man named Jacob. Together they escape the Gulag with Trinity in pursuit. During the chase, Lara is incapacitated and nearly drowns, but Jacob saves her, and she later agrees to aid him and his people in repelling Trinity.

After reaching a valley of hot springs, Lara discovers that Jacob is the leader of its inhabitants, the Remnants, and that they are descendants of the Prophet's followers. Trinity repeatedly attacks the Remnant, justifying the slaughter as God's will. However, Lara discovers that Ana suffers a terminal illness and is seeking the Divine Source to cure herself. Jacob warns Lara that the Divine Source is real but not what she expects it to be. Lara remains undeterred and sets out to find the Atlas, an artifact that shows the way to Kitezh. Sofia, Jacob's daughter, warns Lara of the Deathless Ones, the immortal guardians of Kitezh. Lara finds the Atlas located in the archives beneath the ruins of a Cathedral, and is later reunited with Jonah, who was found by the Remnant and brought to the valley. After Lara discovers the path to Kitezh, Trinity forces return to the valley, take the Atlas and capture Jonah. Lara returns to the Gulag to find Jonah, but Konstantin mortally wounds him. Lara brings Jonah to Jacob, who heals him. Upon witnessing Jonah's rapid recovery, Lara realizes that Jacob is the Prophet, given immortality by the Divine Source.

With Trinity advancing on the glacier looming over Kitezh, Lara is forced to enter the city on a dangerous path. Reading journals written by a Trinity agent, Lara realizes the truth of Jacob's warning: the Divine Source bestows immortality to any who look upon it at the cost of their soul, which is stored in the Source to prevent their death. Trinity breaks through the ice and enters the chamber that houses the Divine Source. With aid from Sofia and the Remnant, Lara battles her way through Trinity towards the chamber. Konstantin ambushes Lara, but she mortally wounds him. Before he dies, Konstantin reveals that Lara's father did not commit suicide but was assassinated by Trinity. Lara enters the chamber but Ana has already retrieved the Divine Source. Jacob and Lara try to reason with Ana to no avail. As the Deathless Ones close in, Ana activates the Divine Source but is overwhelmed by its power, giving Lara a chance to pick it up and smash it to pieces, causing the Deathless Ones to perish. Jacob's immortality is lost, but he is happy his time has finally come. He assures Lara she has made a difference and peacefully disintegrates.

Two weeks later, at Croft Manor, Lara and Jonah overlook their next expedition. Lara vows to investigate more of the world's mysteries and thwart Trinity's plans. In a post-credits scene, two weeks before Lara and Jonah leave Siberia, Lara asks Ana if she killed her father. Ana denies it, admitting that Trinity gave her the order, but she couldn't kill him because she loved him. Before she can reveal anything else, she is killed by a sniper, who asks his unseen superior about killing Lara and is ordered to stand down for the time being.

If the player reloads their save file after finishing the game, Lara is seen telling Sofia about Jacob's passing.

=== Baba Yaga: The Temple of the Witch ===
In the Baba Yaga downloadable content, Lara investigates a disturbance in the Soviet mine. After fighting off a Trinity patrol, she finds a young girl, Nadia, hiding in a sawmill. Nadia confides in Lara about her search for her grandfather, Ivan. Ivan disappeared while trying to enter the Wicked Vale, a valley reportedly haunted by Baba Yaga, a witch in Slavic folklore. Ivan blames the witch for the death of his wife and wants to kill her. Lara is skeptical about Baba Yaga's existence but, since Nadia is injured, agrees to enter the Wicked Vale and find Ivan.

In the Vale, Lara is exposed to a rare pollen with potent hallucinogenic properties. After stumbling through a forest where she is tormented by visions of her father's suicide, she meets Baba Yaga and a pack of demonic wolves. Lara narrowly escapes with her life and finds herself in a small, Soviet-era outpost. She unearths evidence of a secret Soviet biological-weapons project which attempted to harness the pollen, which abruptly ended when the researchers—including Serafima, a biochemist imprisoned in a nearby gulag—succumbed to the hallucinations.

Lara deduces that Serafima weaponized the pollen, developed an antidote, and kept her research secret from the military. With Nadia's help, Lara synthesizes a necessary antidote from Serafima's recipe and returns to the Wicked Vale. Resisting the effects of the pollen, Lara finds the injured Ivan at the entrance to Baba Yaga's lair.

Unable to leave the Wicked Vale while Baba Yaga controls it, Lara battles the witch under the pollen's influence and destroys its source. Baba Yaga is revealed as Serafima, who was led to believe that her husband, Ivan, and daughter were dead and used the pollen to become Baba Yaga and torment her captors. With Ivan, Serafima, and Nadia reunited, Lara leaves the Wicked Vale.

=== Cold Darkness Awakened ===
In the Cold Darkness Awakened content, Lara enters a decommissioned Soviet weapons bunker, which has been breached by a Trinity patrol. Trinity has inadvertently released an unstable pathogen into the air, which causes the people it infects to regress to a zombie-like state. Men are particularly vulnerable since the virus stimulates testosterone and adrenalin production. The pathogen was created to create an army of unstoppable super-soldiers by a Soviet researcher, all of whose experiments failed. He died in the facility after accidentally releasing the pathogen, proud that he had created a weapon to defend his homeland. With Sofia and Nadia providing support from a helicopter, Lara tries to find the source of the pathogen before an enormous cloud is released into the atmosphere and contaminates the Remnant valley.

The women plan to channel the pathogen from three towers into the central tower, detonating it and burning off the toxin. Lara shuts down each tower, collecting equipment, rescuing female prisoners, and eliminating waves of the infected Trinity soldiers before entering the core tower. While fighting off the infected soldiers, she triggers a catastrophic explosion and jumps from the tower to Nadia and Sofia's helicopter. Nadia and Lara watch the explosion as they fly to safety. Although the resulting fire burns the remaining pathogen, documents found in the facility indicate that the release was no accident; Trinity reactivated the facility to acquire a sample of the pathogen, and an agent of Trinity escaped with it before the bunker was destroyed.

=== Blood Ties and Lara's Nightmare ===
Blood Ties begins with Lara reading a note from her maternal uncle which says that, since her father's death and mother's disappearance, he is the rightful owner of Croft Manor. With trees working their way into the side of the house and the roof caving in, Lara's childhood home desperately needs repair. Hoping to find her father's will–which Lara believes will confirm her inheritance–in his safe, she searches the manor for its combination. She finds artifacts from her past and finally figures out the combination; however, the safe contains no proof of her ownership. Instead, she finds further clues that lead Lara to her mother's tomb under the main staircase. With both her parents proven dead, their property passes to her, and she moves back in.

Lara's Nightmare is similar to Blood Ties, with Lara's uncle unwilling to give her the manor. She fights off hordes of zombies and skulls before finding the master key. Lara kills a large skull in the main hallway, ending her nightmare.

== Development ==
Rise of the Tomb Raider was developed by Crystal Dynamics, with Eidos-Montréal providing support. Development of the game began two weeks after the team finished polishing the 2013 reboot. It was led by Noah Hughes and Brian Horton, the franchise's creative and game directors respectively. Rhianna Pratchett returned as the game's writer, and Camilla Luddington reprised her role as protagonist Lara Croft. Bobby Tahouri, known for his work on Game of Thrones, composed the soundtrack. Development was completed on October 9, 2015, with Crystal Dynamics confirming that the game was declared gold (indicating that it was being prepared for duplication and release).

=== Story and gameplay ===
When we think about what Lara's gone through, she's suffered through these traumatic events, seen friends die, and come out of the situation forever changed ... What she needs is a way to reconcile the pain that she has suffered and also the draw that she has, this compulsion, to discover more of these things now that she's just glimpsed them on Yamatai.

— Game director Brian Horton on Lara's state after the 2013 reboot

One of the game's intentions was to craft a more "personal" experience for players, and the team wanted to explore the journey in which Lara becomes the tomb raider. She becomes determined to uncover more myths, and convinces the world that they are real at the end of the 2013 reboot; this became her major driving force in the sequel. Although Lara must still struggle to survive, she is more confident and competent. The team tried to find a balance, making Lara more experienced and competent but vulnerable in crisis and appealing to players. They hoped that in the story, players could see Lara's character progression. To indicate her hunger for knowledge, the team adjusted the collectibles; players would learn new languages including Greek, Mongolian and Russian, unlocking new content and upgrades. The new crafting system reflects Lara's resourcefulness, and her ability to use the environment against her enemies highlights her intelligence.

Rhianna Pratchett found Rise of the Tomb Raider more difficult to write than the 2013 reboot, figuring out Lara's initial mental state and character introduction. Its cast was significantly smaller than the reboot, so more screen time could be given to each character. To help establish the game's tone and visuals, Crystal Dynamics developed a "rippomatic" (a collection of movie scenes). Films included Rambo: First Blood Part II, which inspired the team about the game's stealth mechanic; Terminator 2: Judgment Day, whose protagonist (Sarah Connor) and Lara Croft are "burdened with a truth that no one believes". The Edge and The Grey inspired game scenes in which Lara fought bears and wolves. Hanna and The Descent inspired the game's bows, arrows and pickaxe, and Alien vs. Predator and The Day After Tomorrow helped the team conceive the game's tundra setting.

They worked on improving the story's pacing, which Horton thought as important as the story itself. Several features with gameplay potential but not fitting its context, such as vehicles and an early scene in which Lara battled enemies in a jeep, were cut. The team listened to player feedback about the original game and made gameplay adjustments, such as reducing the number of quick time events, expanding the hunting system, and increasing the significance of traversing and stealth. Cinematic moments and action scenes were retained in the sequel. The theme of survival remained the story's core, with the team modifying gameplay accordingly; the expanded crafting system required players to use the environments more. Crystal Dynamics however avoided making it a survival game; the team felt that it would discourage player exploration. Like its predecessor, Rise of the Tomb Raider has a structure similar to metroidvania; the team wanted players to feel that Siberia is a living, dynamic world, and the game not merely a long sequence of events. According to design director Michael Brinker, the team decided to make the game less "grindy" than other titles; players would not be forced to complete any optional content. The skill-upgrades system was overhauled to include more player options.

After the developers listened to player feedback, the game emphasized tomb-raiding more than its predecessors. According to Hughes, the team analyzed some of the older Tomb Raider titles and distilled their best features while incorporating the reboot's physics-based puzzles. They intended to add more ancient tombs, making players feel like real discoverers and inspiring awe. The tombs were made larger than the reboot, and water puzzles (featured in older Tomb Raider games) were included. The puzzles were often interconnected, with the team adopting a nested-puzzle approach. Optional tombs were made more meaningful, giving players unique skills and items rather than just experience points. The difficulty of each tomb slowly increases as players progress.

=== Art and music ===
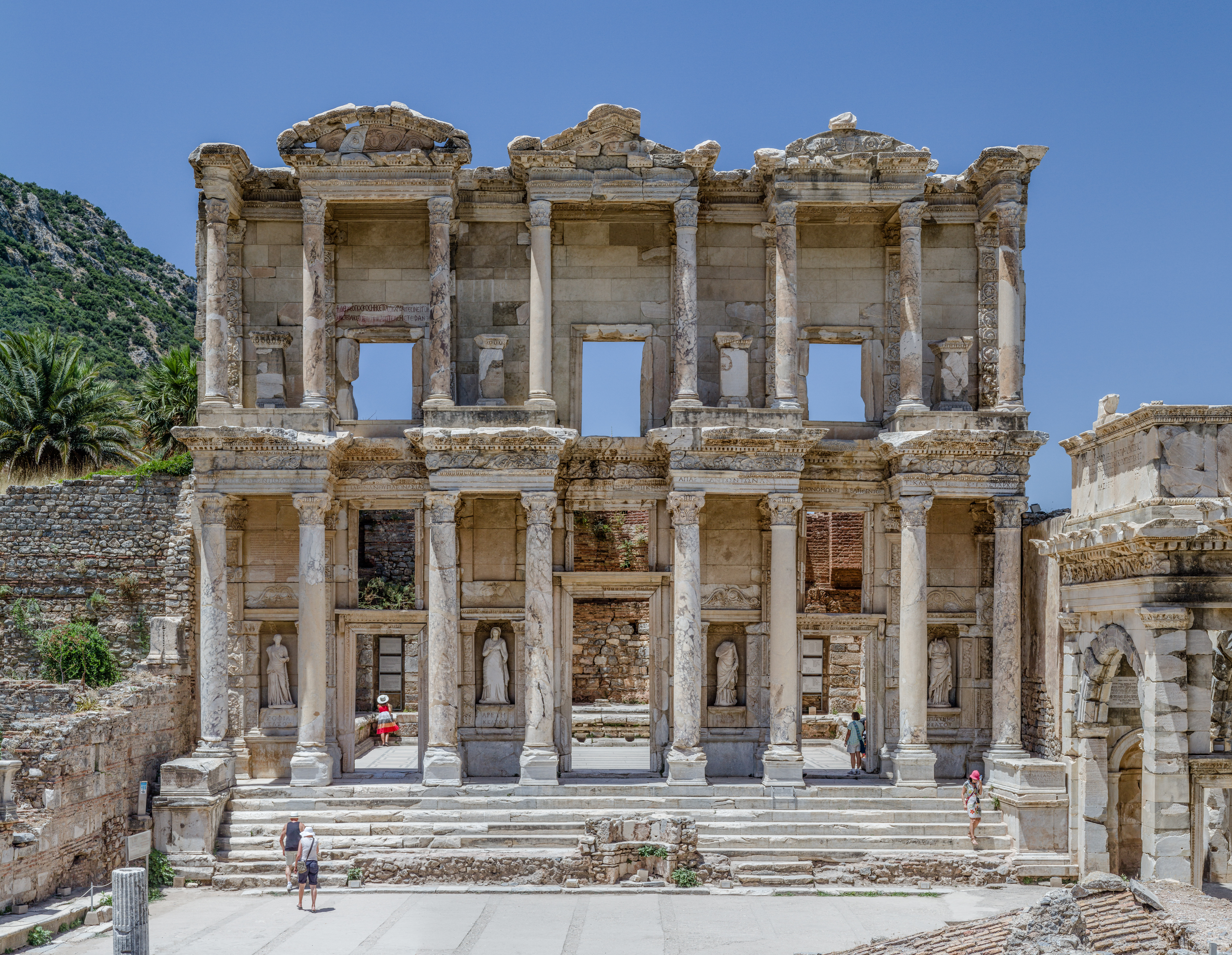
The Library of Celsus in Ephesus inspired the Flooded Archive, one of the game's tombs.

The game world was designed to reflect Lara's distorted mental state, and the team introduced the concept of "ominous beauty" to achieve this. The color scheme was vibrant, reflecting the game's large scale. The team was inspired by other video games and fine art, including Russian realists. They traveled to Yosemite National Park and several locations in Turkey, including Cappadocia, Istanbul and Ephesus, researching Byzantine culture and Greek architecture to design Syria and Kitezh. The team took six months to create the game's snow technology (such as snow tracks and avalanches), which helped increase player immersion in the game. To add variety to its landscape, the team introduced the Oasis (with a dramatically-different look from Siberia).

Bobby Tahouri's primary goal in composing the game's music was to support its narrative. Tahouri spoke to Crystal Dynamics in 2012 and contracted to write the score in late 2013, delighted to have more composition time than previous projects. He listened to the earlier games' soundtracks to "immerse [himself] in the Tomb Raider world". The soundtrack was recorded in Nashville by a 52-piece string-and-brass orchestra, including cello, woodwinds, dulcimer and a handpan developed by Saraz Musical Instruments. The Siberian music features an instrument similar to a gusli and low-pitched male singing. Dynamic Percussion System middleware creates music as the game is played. Crystal Dynamics signed Karen O and guitarist David Pajo to produce the game's theme song, "I Shall Rise".

The game features a Dolby Atmos soundtrack.

=== Technology ===
Camilla Luddington voiced Lara and provided motion capture at a Los Angeles studio over a two-year period. According to the actress, one of the greatest challenges in voicing Lara was having to "yell over wind and snow". Luddington trained for the role, with experts teaching her how to hold the weapons. The team wanted to ensure that Lara's first game for the eighth generation of video game consoles looked good. Spraying Mova fluorescent paint on Luddington's face, they obtained 7,000 points of reference. The team had difficulty developing Lara from motion capture, finding Luddington's footage too realistic, and tried to give the young Lara "subtle" facial expressions. They focused on Lara's physical details in cutscenes, where her muscles tensed as she climbed or her skin became blotchy from the cold. The studio used pose-based deformers to sculpt Lara's "exact shape" as she moved. The team also used wrinkle maps, allowing more natural, realistic movement for the character.

Rise of the Tomb Raider was powered by the Foundation in-house game engine. The team used global illumination and physics-based rendering to create light and shadows. They used a Horizon WYSIWYG editor, editing text and graphics in a form closely resembling the finished product. The team adopted a "kit-bashing technique", quickly assembling a level with modules and rebuilding it until they were satisfied. To improve the game's graphical fidelity, the team partnered with Nixxes Software (which ported the Xbox 360 version).

== Release ==
Square Enix Europe executive Phil Rogers revealed in August 2013 that a new Tomb Raider game was in development for the eighth generation of video game consoles. Microsoft announced the game during an E3 2014 press conference, with a scheduled late-2015 release. Later at Gamescom, the company said that Rise of the Tomb Raider was an exclusive for its Xbox series of video-game platforms, including Xbox 360 and Xbox One; according to Microsoft Studios executive Phil Spencer, this was a timed exclusive similar to Microsoft's deal with Capcom and Crytek on Dead Rising 3 and Ryse: Son of Rome (in which both were released for Windows). This sparked outrage from players, who blamed franchise owner Square Enix for the decision. Microsoft's calling the game "exclusive on Xbox for holiday 2015" caused confusion among the gaming press and players. Rogers explained in 2015 that the Microsoft timed exclusivity was primarily due to the company's strong support for the 2013 reboot. Spencer also spoke on the exclusivity stating that he is a fan of Uncharted and that they needed something similar in their strategy. Crystal Dynamics head Darrell Gallagher said that the partnership was important in helping the team to deliver the best game they could. Rogers called the arrangement a "natural" evolution and a "tough" decision.

Rise of the Tomb Raider was released on November 10, 2015, and the Windows version was released on January 28, 2016. Microsoft Studios was the game's publisher for Xbox 360 and Xbox One. An 18-issue comic series, Tomb Raider, began publication in early 2014. Produced by Dark Horse Comics and written by Pratchett and Gail Simone, the comics bridged the gap between the 2013 reboot and Rise of the Tomb Raider and explained the absence of some secondary characters in the sequel. Microsoft released a Rise of the Tomb Raider Xbox One bundle, including an Xbox One console, a code for Tomb Raider: Definitive Edition and the game. A collector's edition included a 12-inch statue of Lara, a steelbook, a jade necklace and a replica of Lara's journal. A season pass included the base game, additional outfits, weapons and expedition cards, and access to downloadable content. GameStop preorders had exclusive access to the Holy Fire Card Pack, which can be used in the game's expeditions mode. Microsoft live-streamed a Survival Billboard marketing event on Twitch. Eight contestants standing in front of a Southwark Street billboard were subjected to different harsh weather conditions, which were voted by Twitch's viewers. The contestant enduring the weather longest received a "Tomb Raider-themed trip". Players could earn in-game rewards by participating (and interacting with) Twitch live-streaming in expedition mode.

The game was supported by downloadable content, and its first post-launch update was released on December 4, a month after the game's initial release. It introduced an endurance mode, with elements of a survival game as Lara hunts and crafts items while facing hidden dangers and environmental hazards. The first story add-on, Baba Yaga: The Temple of the Witch, was released on January 26, 2016 for Xbox One. Cold Darkness Awakened, the third DLC, which was released on March 29, 2016, introduced a horde mode in which Lara fights waves of infected enemies. A Rise of the Tomb Raider: 20 Year Celebration edition was released for PlayStation 4 on October 11, 2016. The edition (developed by Nixxes Software and Crystal Dynamics) adds several new features, including a classic outfit inspired by Tomb Raider III; cooperative gameplay for endurance mode; Blood Ties, a combat-free mode in which Lara explores Croft Manor; and Lara's Nightmare, in which players fight infected enemies in the manor. The DLC was free of charge to season-pass holders. To promote the 20 Year Celebration edition, the marketing team hung a Jeep from the side of a building in Times Square. Blood Ties supported PlayStation VR when 20 Year Celebration was released, and Oculus Rift and HTC Vive were supported on December 6, 2017. Feral Interactive released the game for macOS and Linux in April 2018. Aspyr released the 20 Year Celebration edition on the Nintendo Switch 2 in June 2026.

== Reception ==
=== Critical reception ===
Reception

Aggregate scores
Aggregator	Score
Metacritic	XONE: 86/100; PC: 86/100; PS4: 88/100; NS2: 79/100
OpenCritic	88% recommend

Review scores
Publication	Score
Destructoid	7.5/10
Electronic Gaming Monthly	8/10
Game Informer	9.5/10
GameRevolution	5/5
GameSpot	9/10
GamesRadar+	4.5/5
IGN	9.3/10

Rise of the Tomb Raider received critical acclaim. (Note: Attributed to multiple references:) According to review aggregator website Metacritic, it garnered "generally favorable reviews". Fellow review aggregator OpenCritic assessed that the game received "mighty" approval, being recommended by 88% of critics.

The game's graphics were praised by critics. Kimberly Wallace of Game Informer called them "stunning" and praised Crystal Dynamics for creating detailed environments for players to explore, although she noted several frame rate issues. Spencer Campbell of Electronic Gaming Monthly agreed, describing the areas as "gorgeous" and noting that every location in the game looked unique. Justin Towell of GamesRadar praised the game's presentation and appreciated its animation, noting that it was a AAA production. Steven Hansen of Destructoid called it one of the best-looking games on the market, although he considered some of the lighting unrealistic.

Wallace praised the story for several memorable moments, although she thought it was predictable except for the ending scene. She liked the writers' decision to explore the relationship between Lara and her father and with Trinity, which she found interesting. Campbell criticized the story for being simple and formulaic; it "took too many cues" from Raiders of the Lost Ark, and its characters were undeveloped and forgettable. Mike Mahardy of GameSpot wrote that the story was emotional and the characters grounded and believable; its mysticism "makes sense within the world they occupy", and he called the story tragic but uplifting. Towell praised the story for several surprising moments and was largely impressed by the voice acting, but was disappointed that the story was so similar to the 2013 reboot. Peter Paras of Game Revolution singled out Luddington's performance as Lara, saying that she imbues the character with a sense of wonderment and determination. Lucy O'Brien of IGN called Lara an "endearing" character driven by "complex ambitions", and described the game's villains as "strong".

Wallace found Rise of the Tomb Raider's combat entertaining overall, and enjoyed the stealth section. She liked the upgrade trees (which accommodate different styles of play), but found later combat sections repetitious. Campbell called the stealth section satisfyingly challenging, and enjoyed the range of player choices. He noted the combat's more-strategic nature, due to its larger arsenal. Mahardy called the combat "superb", praising the game for giving players the freedom to experiment with gameplay mechanics. He found the resource-gathering tedious, but the crafting system well-executed. Towell liked the game's combat and stealth, comparing it to Metal Gear Solid V: The Phantom Pain and noting that Lara often felt like a "cold-blooded killer" due to the abundance of combat. He felt that there were too many items to collect. O'Brien found some combat sections uninspired, but the new crafting abilities made them more enjoyable. She called the stealth component enjoyable but redundant. Although Hansen liked the addition of stealth, he said that Rise did not address the problems with the 2013 reboot (in which Lara was too violent, causing narrative dissonance).

Wallace praised the game's abundant side content, finding it intriguing enough to lure her away from the main story. She liked the Metroidvania world design, and the large hubs encouraged her to explore. Wallace enjoyed the expanded tombs and the puzzles, which were deeper and more intricate than those in the previous game. Campbell praised its hunting mechanic, which enhanced the game world. He wrote that the narrative shortcomings were balanced by gameplay complexity, particularly the optional tomb puzzles. Mahardy praised the open hubs' "waterfall structure", where every player action may unlock new possibilities; however, Towell found the hubs filled with aimless, unappealing content. O'Brien called the challenge tombs the game's highlight (paying homage to the older Tomb Raider games), despite its shortage of puzzles. Hansen found much of the content "open world busywork", which he compared to the Assassin's Creed game series. Paras wrote that the expedition mode was a "real treat", but Oli Welsh of Eurogamer criticized it, saying that there was no reason for the mode to exist other than to please YouTubers and generate revenue from microtransactions.

Wallace called Rise of the Tomb Raider "better in every way" than the 2013 reboot, and said that the game had high replayability. Campbell was disappointed by the story, but considered the game an overall improvement on its predecessor. Towell called the game a "safe sequel" which took few risks, but had a successful formula; O'Brien agreed that it succeeded in refining its predecessor's formula. Hansen found much of the game's content bloated; although it was an improvement, he criticized it for not fixing many of the original's shortcomings. According to Paras, the Tomb Raider franchise surpassed gaming classics such as Resident Evil 4 and Uncharted 2: Among Thieves after 20 years with Rise of the Tomb Raider.

=== Sales ===
Some gaming journalists were concerned about Rise of the Tomb Raider's sales, since it was released on the same day as Fallout 4 (a highly anticipated game from Bethesda Game Studios, which also had Microsoft as its marketing partner). However, Microsoft believed that the games would not compete with one another. It was the fourth best-selling game in the United Kingdom in its week of release (behind Fallout 4, Call of Duty: Black Ops III and FIFA 16). The game however did not sell well enough in the month after its release to appear on the NPD Group chart. According to Square Enix, its initial commercial performance was "solid"; game director Brian Horton and Microsoft executive Aaron Greenberg said that Microsoft Studios and Square Enix were satisfied with the game's sales. Digitally, the Windows version sold three times better than the Xbox One version in the first month of release.

Rise of the Tomb Raider had sold over one million units by the end of 2015. The game had sold nearly seven million units by November 2017, and 11.8 million units by November 2021.

=== Awards ===
In 2015, Telegraph Video Game Awards nominated the game for Game of the Year and named it the runner-up for Best Level Design. At GameSpot's Game of the Year Awards, the game placed eighth in the Game of the Year category and was nominated for Xbox One Game of the Year. Similarly, it placed fifth for GamesRadar's Game of the Year. EGM's Best of 2015 ranked it in tenth place for the Best Game award. In the category of Game of the Year at Game Revolution's Best of 2015 Awards, it earned the recognition of a runner-up position. Additionally, Crystal Dynamics was nominated for Best Developer, while the game attained the title of Best Action Adventure. It won Best Xbox One Game of the Year and Best Action-Adventure Game at IGN's Best of 2015 Awards, where it was nominated for Game of the Year, Best Art Direction, Technical Excellence, and Best Story, as well as being a runner-up in the Best Performances and Best Xbox 360 Game of the Year categories.

Year	Award	Category	Result	Ref.
2015	33rd Golden Joystick Awards	Most Wanted Game	Nominated	
2015	The Game Awards	Best Performance (Camilla Luddington)	Nominated	
2015	The Game Awards	Best Action/Adventure	Nominated	
2015	Canadian Videogame Awards 2015	Fans' Choice: Best International Game	Nominated	
2016	NAVGTR awards	Animation, Artistic	Won	
2016	NAVGTR awards	Art Direction, Contemporary	Won	
2016	NAVGTR awards	Graphics, Technical	Nominated	
2016	NAVGTR awards	Lighting/Texturing	Won	
2016	NAVGTR awards	Performance in a Drama, Lead (Luddington as Lara Croft)	Nominated	
2016	NAVGTR awards	Sound Effects	Nominated	
2016	NAVGTR awards	Use of Sound, Franchise	Nominated	
2016	NAVGTR awards	Game, Franchise Adventure	Won	
2016	68th Writers Guild of America Awards	Outstanding Achievement in Videogame Writing	Won	
2016	19th Annual D.I.C.E. Awards	Game of the Year	Nominated	
2016	19th Annual D.I.C.E. Awards	Adventure Game of the Year	Nominated	
2016	19th Annual D.I.C.E. Awards	Outstanding Achievement in Game Direction	Nominated	
2016	19th Annual D.I.C.E. Awards	Outstanding Achievement in Animation	Nominated	
2016	19th Annual D.I.C.E. Awards	Outstanding Achievement in Art Direction	Nominated	
2016	19th Annual D.I.C.E. Awards	Outstanding Achievement in Character (Lara Croft)	Won	
2016	19th Annual D.I.C.E. Awards	Outstanding Achievement in Sound Design	Nominated	
2016	19th Annual D.I.C.E. Awards	Outstanding Achievement in Story	Nominated	
2016	19th Annual D.I.C.E. Awards	Outstanding Technical Achievement	Nominated	
2016	Satellite Awards	Outstanding Action/Adventure Game	Won	
2016	SXSW Gaming Awards	Excellence in Animation	Won	
2016	SXSW Gaming Awards	Excellence in Visual Achievement	Nominated	
2016	SXSW Gaming Awards	Excellence in SFX	Nominated	
2016	SXSW Gaming Awards	Most Enduring Character (Lara Croft)	Won	
2016	Canadian Videogame Awards 2016	Fans' Choice: Best International Game	Won	

== In other media ==
Some plot elements from Rise of the Tomb Raider were incorporated into the 2018 film adaptation of Tomb Raider. An announced sequel for that film, which was delayed due to COVID-19, was considered to adapt Rise. The sequel was cancelled in July 2022 as Metro-Goldwyn-Mayer lost the film rights to the franchise after its expiration.

== Sequel ==
Shadow of the Tomb Raider was confirmed by Square Enix. It is the third game in the rebooted origin story. Eidos-Montréal replaced Crystal Dynamics as the game's lead developer. It was released worldwide on PlayStation 4, Windows, and Xbox One on September 14, 2018.
