= I'll Always Know What You Did Last Summer =

2006 film

- DVD cover
- Directed by: Sylvain White
- Written by: Michael Weiss
- Based on: Characters by Lois Duncan
- Produced by: Neal H. Moritz; Erik Feig
- Starring: Brooke Nevin; David Paetkau; Torrey DeVitto; Ben Easter; Don Shanks
- Cinematography: Stephen M. Katz
- Edited by: David Checel
- Music by: Justin Burnett
- Production companies: Destination Films; Original Film; Mandalay Pictures
- Distributed by: Sony Pictures Home Entertainment
- Release date: August 15, 2006
- Running time: 92 minutes
- Country: United States
- Language: English

I'll Always Know What You Did Last Summer is a 2006 American direct-to-video supernatural slasher film that is a standalone sequel to the 1998 film I Still Know What You Did Last Summer. The film stars Brooke Nevin, David Paetkau, Torrey DeVitto, Ben Easter, and stuntman Don Shanks as the Fisherman. It is directed by Sylvain White and written by Michael D. Weiss. It is the third installment in the I Know What You Did Last Summer franchise. I'll Always Know What You Did Last Summer was released by Sony Pictures Home Entertainment on August 15, 2006. The film was panned by critics. A 2025 sequel was made that ignores the events of the film.

== Plot ==
On July 4, 2005, in the fictional town of Broken Ridge, Colorado, Amber Williams, her boyfriend Colby Patterson and their friends Zoe, Roger, and PJ stage a prank at the town carnival where Roger impersonates the "Fisherman" killer. Afterward, everyone sees PJ's body impaled on a tractor smokestack instead of the mattresses that were supposed to break his fall. The public believes the Fisherman is behind it, and the friends burn the evidence and make a pact to keep it secret. They all say "The secret dies with us."

One year later, Amber returns to town to discover that Colby's internship in Los Angeles did not push through. She goes up to the mountains, where she encounters Deputy Haffner who is one of the officers who witnessed the accident. Sheriff Davis, PJ's father, resents his son's friends for PJ's death. Later that night, Amber awakens to 50 text messages reading "I know what you did last summer." She drives to Zoe's shack where Zoe allows Amber to sleep for the night. The next day, they find Roger and Colby, but he angrily dismisses them when told about the messages. Amber is attacked on a ski-lift by someone wielding the hook.

A drunken Roger contemplates suicide with the hook from the prank. When he investigates a strange noise, he is attacked and killed by the Fisherman. They go to warn Roger and find him dead along with a suicide note and the hook. Deputy Haffner shows up and gets their statements. Afterward, they return to Amber's house to find pictures of them from the high school yearbook sliced up and stuck to the wall reading "SOON". They all stay at Zoe's place. The next day, they talk with Lance, PJ's cousin but Colby suggests that the killer might be his uncle, Sheriff Davis. Later that night, Colby is injured by the Fisherman while swimming. After Lance gets a warning engraved on his motorbike, the four decide to leave town, but Zoe decides to stay after hearing that a major talent scout will be at the town's festival where her band will be performing, which could give them their big break; the four decide to stick together and stay.

After Zoe performs at the festival, she, Amber, and Lance are attacked by the Fisherman. Zoe is stabbed and thrown over a balcony to her death. Sheriff Davis finds Zoe's body and holds Amber and Lance at gunpoint, only to be killed as well. The Fisherman then attacks Colby in a kitchen and hooks him in the mouth, killing him. Outside, Amber and Lance run into Deputy Haffner, who reveals that Roger told him about the accident. The Fisherman then advances towards Haffner and impales him on a forklift.

Amber and Lance get into a car and run the Fisherman down. He gets up and is revealed to be the undead Ben Willis, the man who committed the original murders 8 years ago. (Note: As depicted in I Know What You Did Last Summer (1997)) Ben attacks them but is cut with a hook by Amber and disappears. Amber and Lance go to face Ben, deducing that the hook will hurt him. They are chased outside the festival, where Amber fights Ben, stabs him in the head and pushes him into a thresher, killing him.

One year later, Amber is driving across the desert when a tire blows out. She stops the car and gets out. Ben appears behind her and attacks.

== Cast ==
- Brooke Nevin as Amber Williams
- David Paetkau as Colby Patterson
- Torrey DeVitto as Zoe
- Ben Easter as Lance
- Seth Packard as Roger
- KC Clyde as Deputy Hafner
- Clay Taylor as PJ
- Michael Flynn as Sheriff Davis
- Levy Whitlock as Mitch
- Brittanie Nicole Leary as Kim
- Star LaPointe as Kelly
- Don Shanks as The Fisherman

== Production ==
In August 2000, it was reported that Columbia Pictures was developing a third I Know What You Did Last Summer film to be written by Simon Barry. From the beginning it was determined the film would not follow the characters from the prior entry with the initial script involving a group of characters on an Outward Bound-style wilderness excursion who are hunted by an assailant. In July 2005, it was reported Sony Pictures was moving forward with the working title I Know What You Did Last Summer 3 with Michael D. Weiss now set to write the film which would follow a group of teenagers who believe they accidentally killed a man only to discover that their would-be victim is now out to kill them. Like the earlier Barry draft this incarnation was also independent of the prior entries. Sony did consider giving the film a theatrical release before ultimately releasing it direct-to-video.

Director Sylvain White was brought in as a last-minute replacement after the previous director was fired, and thus had to cast the film, prep the locations, and devise the shooting schedule within just two weeks. White did not use any CGI, as he felt that gore looks much more realistic with practical effects.

== Release ==
The film did not receive a theatrical release, instead going straight-to-DVD on August 15, 2006. The film received a Blu-ray release on September 26, 2023, in a MOD (Manufactured-On-Demand) release.

== Reception ==
On the review aggregator website Rotten Tomatoes, 0% of 7 critics' reviews are positive, with an average rating of 2.5/10.

== Sequel ==
Following a prolonged hiatus, a fourth installment of the series was announced, which was released on July 18, 2025, and is a direct sequel to I Still Know What You Did Last Summer.
