= Ana Isabelle =

Puerto Rican dancer

- Born: April 11, 1986 (age 40); Caguas, Puerto Rico
- Occupations: Singer; actress; dancer; entrepreneur
- Years active: 2007-present
- Website: anaisabelle.com

Ana Isabel Acevedo Avilés is a Puerto Rican singer, actress, dancer, and entrepreneur. In December 2007, she released her first album, Por El Amor and in 2009, she won Univision's Viva el Sueño.

== Career ==
Her professional experience ranges from dancer and backup singer for different Latin artists to acting in various movies.

Her acting roles include the lead in five episodes of Decisiones Puerto Rico and minor roles in the movies Yellow, El Cantante, and Talento de Barrio. She also has participated in musicals such as Fame, A Chorus Line and High School Musical.

In December 2007 she released her first album, Por El Amor, along with three singles, "Cuando No Estas", "Quien Dijo Amigos", and "Dime". In 2009, she released a deluxe version of the album, along with a new single "Se Acabo" featuring Juan Velez, that was a radio hit in Puerto Rico.

In November 2009 she won 1st place in Viva el Sueño, a TV reality show on Univision. After this, she released her second album in Puerto Rico, but first internationally, Mi Sueño. It is a collection of cover versions of hits she sang on Viva El Sueño. The first single released was "Por Amarte Así", featuring Cristian Castro, the song's original performer.

On July 4, 2011, she released the single "La Vida Es Bella", featuring Chino y Nacho and her family. The music video also featured her family.

In 2021, she played Rosalia in Steven Spielberg's remake of West Side Story.

== Discography ==
- "Por El Amor" (2007)
- "Por El Amor Deluxe Edition" (2009)
- "Mi Sueño" (2010)

== Filmography ==
- Dementia 13 (2017)
- The Eyes (2017)
- After Everything (2018)
- Imprisoned (2019)
- West Side Story (2021)
- Fight Back (2026)
