= Dementia 13 (2017 film) =

- Theatrical poster
- Directed by: Richard LeMay
- Screenplay by: Dan DeFilippo; Justin Smith
- Produced by: Dan DeFilippo; Justin Smith
- Starring: Julia Campanelli; Ana Isabelle; Christian Ryan; Channing Pickett; Marianne Noscheze; Leila Grace; Ben van Berkum; Steve Polites; Donal Brophy
- Cinematography: Paul Niccolls
- Edited by: Karim López
- Music by: Adonis Tsilimparis
- Production companies: Pipeline Entertainment (II); Haloran LLC
- Distributed by: Chiller Films
- Release date: October 6, 2017 (United States)
- Running time: 83.5 minutes
- Country: United States
- Language: English

Dementia 13 (alternately titled Haloran Manor) is a 2017 American horror film directed by Richard LeMay, and starring Julia Campanelli, Ana Isabelle, Marianne Noscheze, Channing Pickett, and Christian Ryan. It is a remake of 1963's Dementia 13. As of February 2022, it is the last film released by Chiller Films.

== Plot ==
The plot revolves around a vengeful ghost, a mysterious killer, and a family in a night of terror at a secluded estate.

== Cast ==
- Julia Campanelli as Gloria Haloran
- Ana Isabelle as Louise Haloran
- Marianne Noscheze as Billy Haloran
- Channing Pickett as Rose Haloran
- Christian Ryan as John Haloran
- Anthony Salvador Lewis as Father Matos
- Steve Polites as Dale
- Ben van Berkum as Kane
- Roland Sands as Arthur

== Release ==
=== Theatrical release ===
The film was released on October 6, 2017.

== Reception ==
Reviews for the film have been mixed. Matt Boiselle writing for Dread Central gave the film two and a half stars saying "Overall, this version of a film that back in the day tried very hard to stand alone unfortunately doesn’t do enough to raise itself up from a seated position. If you’re in the mood to compare and contrast the old with the new, then by all means give this one a watch, but I saw it as a singular view and not much more." John DeFore with The Hollywood Reporter called the film "a fairly mild thriller that, in the crowded horror marketplace, will rely on its pedigree for most of its appeal."

Kimber Myers of the Los Angeles Times enjoyed the film. "A remake of Francis Ford Coppola’s early horror film Dementia 13 likely wasn’t on anyone’s wish list, but this update from Richard LeMay is an enjoyably cheap little gift...Beyond its style, Dementia 13 doesn’t innovate, but it’s a capably made indie that should please genre fans searching for a haunted diversion."
