= George Hardy (actor) =

American actor and film actor

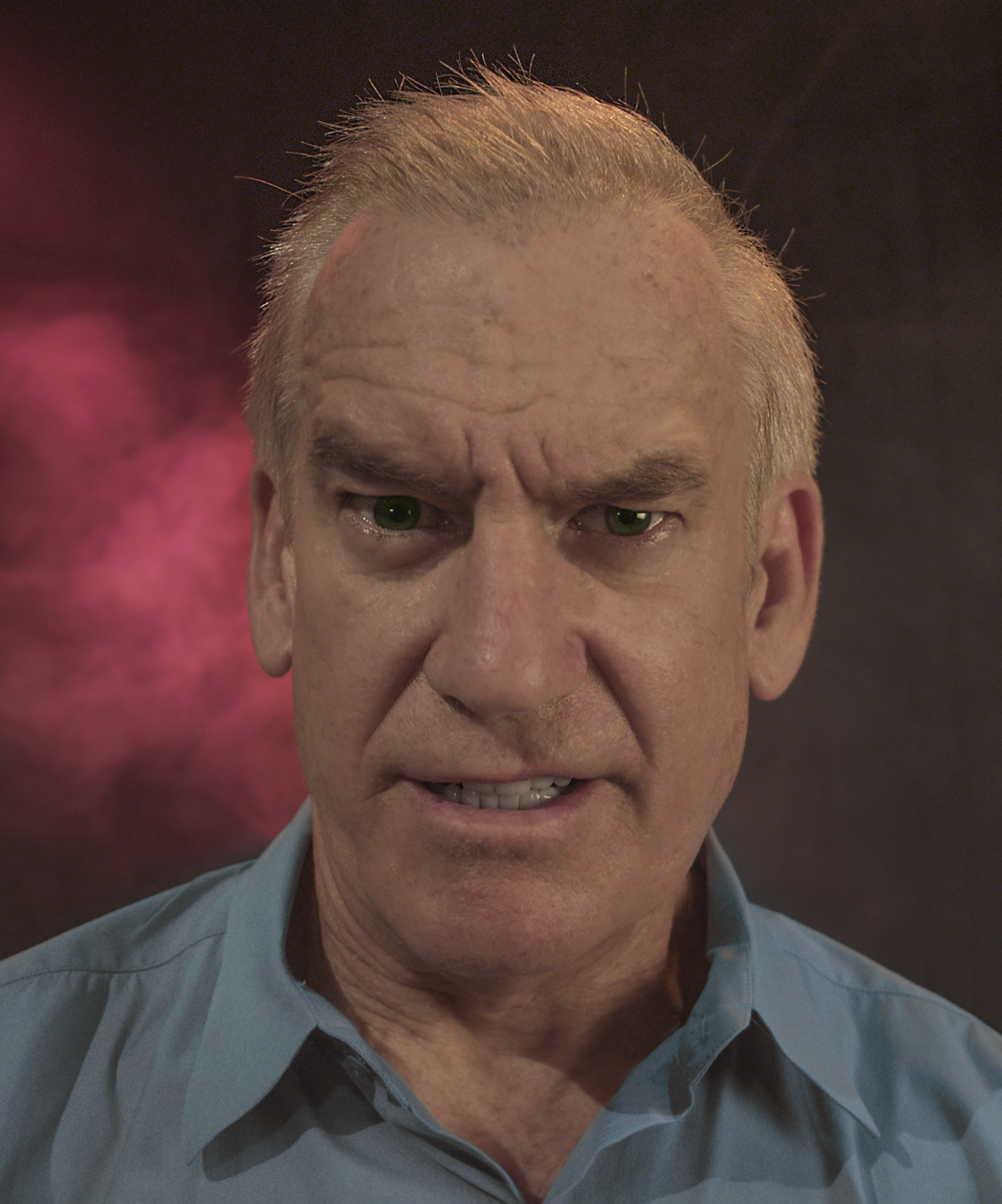
- George Hardy in 2015
- Born: October 16, 1954 (age 72); Alexander City, Alabama, U.S.
- Education: Auburn University; UAB School of Dentistry
- Occupations: Actor, dentist
- Years active: 1990–present

George Hardy (born October 16, 1954) is an American dentist and actor who played the leading role in the cult horror film Troll 2 (1990), which is regarded as one of the worst films ever made. In 2021 he was in the horror movie CYST.

== Career ==
Hardy graduated from Auburn University in 1977. He was also an Auburn cheerleader. At that time he was interested in theater. He took acting classes, but gave up the idea of becoming an actor because he feared that it wouldn't be a practical career. Hardy eventually became a dentist. He was practicing in Salt Lake City when he auditioned for Troll 2 at the urging of some of his patients. He ended up winning the role of Michael Waits, head of the family that falls victim to the titular villains. After the film's dismal reception following a direct-to-video release, he returned to practicing dentistry full-time and did not pursue acting any further.

Word of mouth slowly spread about Troll 2 regarding how laughably poor it was, allowing a loyal fanbase to develop. This reached a head with the Upright Citizens Brigade's 2006 "Troll 2 Experience" screening, where Hardy was thrust back into the limelight as a guest of honor (along with several other cast members). He and fellow co-star Michael Stephenson collaborated shortly thereafter on the behind-the-scenes documentary Best Worst Movie (2009). This film has gone on to receive widespread critical and audience acclaim and was the centerpiece of an international tour that both Hardy and Stephenson engaged in between 2009 and 2010.

Following the success of Best Worst Movie, Hardy revived his acting career and has been involved in numerous projects. These include Eric Hordes' film Under ConTroll, in which he reprises his Troll 2 role of Michael Waits. Hardy had his first leading role since Troll 2 when he played Sgt. Travis Delmore in Texas Cotton (2018), which he also executive-produced.

== Personal life ==
He currently resides in his hometown of Alexander City, Alabama, where he has maintained a dental practice since 1991.
