= The Monkey's Paw (2013 film) =

2013 film

- film poster
- Directed by: Brett Simmons
- Screenplay by: Macon Blair
- Based on: "The Monkey's Paw" by W. W. Jacobs
- Produced by: Ross Otterman
- Starring: Stephen Lang; C. J. Thomason; Corbin Bleu; Charles S. Dutton
- Music by: Bobby Tahouri
- Production company: TMP Films
- Distributed by: Chiller Films
- Release date: October 8, 2013
- Running time: 91 minutes
- Country: United States
- Language: English
- Budget: $694,068

The Monkey's Paw is a 2013 American horror film based on the 1902 short story by author W. W. Jacobs. The film revolves around Jake Tilton, who receives a mysterious monkey's paw talisman that grants him three wishes. The film was directed by Brett Simmons, written by Macon Blair, and produced by Ross Otterman for TMP Films. It is a Chiller Films presentation.

The film was released in theaters and video on demand on October 8, 2013.

== Plot ==
Co-workers Jake and Tony discuss their problems at a bar. Jake is in love with his ex-wife Olivia, who is now married to their boss Kevin, while Tony's ex-wife Abby won't let him see his son. They meet another co-worker, Gillespie, who was fired that day and blames Jake. He shows them a monkey's paw which he claims can grant three wishes. Jake rubs the paw and jokingly wishes for the muscle car outside the bar. Gillespie leaves, saying the paw is now Jake's problem.

As Jake and Tony leave, they notice that the muscle car is unlocked with the keys in the ignition. They drive it to Olivia's house where she rejects Jake's attempts to reconcile. Speeding away, Jake swerves to avoid hitting an alligator and crashes the car, killing Tony. Jake attempts to use the monkey's paw to revive Tony, then panics and runs when a truck approaches. Shortly later, he sees graffiti of monkey skulls and throws the paw away.

The truck driver, a young blonde woman, begins to call for an ambulance. Tony recovers but is confused, asking, "Am I still dead?" She takes him to her home, treats the wounds on his face, and attempts to have sex with him. She questions him about his "Abby" tattoo and the thought of Abby causes him to reject her. He tries to leave but the blonde confronts him and in a flash of anger Tony strangles her. Tony goes to Abby's house to see his son, but Abby reports him to the police for violating a restraining order.

When Tony does not come to work, Jake calls area hospitals but makes no progress. Walking home from work, he hears Tony calling him from a graveyard. Tony tells Jake that he wants the third wish from the monkey's paw, but Jake is in disbelief. Believing that Jake intends to use the third wish to get Olivia back, Tony assures him that he will get her back without wishing. That night, Tony attacks and kills Kevin.

Jake cannot find the monkey's paw. He goes to his brother Charlie's house for breakfast and to discuss their terminally ill mother. Later, Olivia tells Jake that Kevin is missing and that their marriage is falling apart. A fortune teller says that Jake has willingly entered into evil and is responsible for the man with no soul.

Jake returns home where Tony demands the last wish, but Jake explains that he can't find the monkey's paw and has problems with his mother's medical bills. Tony smothers Jake's mother at the hospital, which staff believe was a natural death. At the graveyard the next night, Tony admits to killing Jake's mother and they fight, with Tony overpowering Jake. Tony demands the monkey's paw, wishing for his son to be in his life.

Jake tells everything to Charlie and his wife Sandy. They are skeptical but believe Tony is dangerous and agree to leave town. Jake tells Detective Margolis that Tony threatened him and his family, and Margolis informs Jake of Kevin's suspicious death.

Jake visits Gillespie, who reveals that his father had wished on the paw, bringing his family great misfortune. He warns Jake that any more wishes are likely to bring additional trouble. Shortly later, Tony kills Gillespie and Margolis orders Tony's arrest. Tony then murders Charlie and Sandy, his physical state deteriorating. Jake warns Abby about Tony then buys a handgun. Margolis tries to take Olivia to a safehouse for protection but is murdered by Tony, who abducts Olivia.

Tony takes Olivia to Abby's house. Jake frees her and they hear Tony assaulting Abby. Jake gives the monkey's paw to Tony, who is bleeding profusely. He grabs Olivia. Jake accepts blame for everything that happened and wishes that Tony had his soul. Tony screams in pain, stabs Olivia, and severely beats Jake. He tries to get into the room with his son but Abby stops him. Tony says that he wanted to take his boy fishing then kills himself with Jake's gun. Olivia crawls to Jake and asks him to hold on. Jake awakens in an ambulance, panicking about the paw, and is restrained by EMT personnel.

Later, Abby is packing a moving truck. The camera shows her son playing with the monkey's paw.

== Cast ==
- Stephen Lang as Tony Cobb
- C. J. Thomason as Jake Tilton
- Daniel Hugh Kelly as Gillespie
- Corbin Bleu as Catfish
- Charles S. Dutton as Detective Margolis
- Michelle Pierce as Olivia
- Tauvia Dawn as Abby
- Grayson Berry as Charlie
- Sabrina Gennarino as Sandy

== Production ==
The film was shot on location in New Orleans and faced difficulties filming in the aftermath of Hurricane Katrina.

== Home media ==
The film was released on DVD and Blu-ray by Shout! Factory under their Scream Factory label on June 17, 2014.
