= Ben Easter =

American actor and photographer

- Years active: 1999–present
- Website: www.beneasterphotography.com

Ben Easter is an American actor and photographer.

Easter made his film debut in 2000 in Cora Unashamed. He was later a repeated costar of Mary-Kate and Ashley Olsen, appearing alongside them in the film Holiday in the Sun and the television series So Little Time. He has also appeared in Pearl Harbor, Zenon: Z3, and I'll Always Know What You Did Last Summer.

Easter began working as a professional photographer in 2008, and his photographs have since been featured in Icon, Glamaholic, Yoga Iowa, and DSM Magazine. An exhibit of his at the Polk County Jail in Des Moines, Iowa, titled "Confliction", was later restaged in Paris by UNESCO. He has worked for Wilhelmina Models and Next Management, and was one of the photographers for the 2012 Obama presidential campaign. In addition to his photography, Easter also works as a yoga instructor.

In 1999, Easter was selected as one of "America's Most Wanted Men" by Cosmopolitan.

== Filmography ==
=== Film ===
Year	Film	Role	Other notes
2000	Cora Unashamed	Willie Matsoulis	
2001	Holiday in the Sun	Jordan Landers	
2001	Pearl Harbor	Sailor	
2003	The Challenge	Himself	
2004	Zenon: Z3	Sage Borealis	
2006	I'll Always Know What You Did Last Summer	Lance Jones	
2006	Phone Sex	Caller	
2011	Husk	Johnny	
2012	Returning	John Samuels	
2013	After Life	Rudy	
2015	A Place for Heroes	Younger Robert	
2015	Up on the Wooftop	Bulldozer	

=== Television ===
Year	Title	Role	Other notes
1999	Undressed	Carl	1 episode
2000	That's Life	Student #3	Episode: "The Screw-Up"
2002	So Little Time	Lennon Kincaid	Recurring role, 7 episodes
2003	Boston Public	Jason Dunphy	2 episodes
2014	Morganville: The Series	Michael Glass	Main role, miniseries
