= Aftermath (2014 film) =

2014 film by Peter Engert

- Directed by: Peter Engert
- Screenplay by: Christian McDonald
- Produced by: Bobbi Sue Luther; Zachary Reeves; Scott Winig; Peter Engert
- Starring: C. J. Thomason; Monica Keena; Edward Furlong
- Cinematography: Scott Winig
- Edited by: Nathan Bezner; Nikki Winig
- Music by: Austin Wintory
- Production companies: Eastlake Films; LightWave Entertainment
- Distributed by: Image Entertainment
- Release date: July 18, 2014
- Running time: 92 minutes
- Country: United States
- Language: English

Aftermath (also known under its working title, Remnants) is a 2014 American apocalyptic thriller film directed by Peter Engert. The film stars C. J. Thomason, Monica Keena, and Edward Furlong as a group of survivors taking shelter in a Texas farmhouse.

== Plot ==
As the film opens, Hunter (C. J. Thomason) is on a highway where he meets Jennifer and her young brother Satchel. While stopped, they witness several mushroom clouds that destroy nearby "targets." Satchel is blinded by looking directly at a nuclear detonation. The detonations generate an electromagnetic pulse which disables Jennifer's car. They search for and locate an old diesel vehicle which is not affected by the EMP, and scour nearby stores collecting supplies.

They meet and join with Elizabeth (Monica Keena) who tells them she saw explosions over other major cities in visual range. Car radio reports state that major cities on both the East and West coasts have been destroyed.

Hunter is shot by a frightened child while trying to find shelter in a local home. They leave immediately, unable to help the child.

They find another farmhouse nearby, which they initially mistake for unoccupied. As they attempt to gain entry, Hunter's group are interrupted by Brad (Edward Furlong) and Jonathan (Ross Britz). Brad, holding them at gunpoint, tries to drive them away, but is disarmed by Hunter. Jonathan, whose grandparents own the house, agrees to let Hunter and his party join the four survivors already inside: Jonathan, his diabetic uncle Wendell, Brad, and Brad's pregnant wife Angie.

Hunter organizes the survivors and instructs them to move all of their supplies into the cellar and attempt to seal it against the radioactive fallout which is coming. He tends to his own gunshot wound, finding a small bottle of antibiotics in a medicine cabinet in the bathroom. Once all of their supplies are stored in the cellar, Hunter and Jonathan barricade the door, sealing themselves inside. Hunter tells the survivors that they will need to remain inside the cellar for at least a month to avoid the fallout's worst effects. Hunter finds a Geiger counter which reveals that the radiation level is already much higher than expected.

Over the next few days, Jonathan retrieves the electronics he previously stored inside a metal safe—a radio and his MP3 player, which have survived the blast. Jonathan focuses on fixing the short-wave radio, and the survivors hear news of destruction in Europe and elsewhere by nuclear bombs. Repairing the microphone allows them to begin speaking with other survivors in bunkers elsewhere in the States.

They are joined by Jonathan's friend Rob (Andre Royo) a few days later, who is accidentally shot while trying to gain entry to the basement. Having been outside for longer, he has radiation burns and the early signs of radiation poisoning. He survives his gunshot wound and Jonathan, stricken with grief after accidentally shooting his friend, welcomes him into their shelter.

Despite their precautions, all of the survivors begin to weaken from radiation exposure. Jonathan's uncle Wendell, already weakened by diabetes, dies first. While burying Wendell, the survivors fend off an attack by desperate survivors weakened by nearly two weeks of exposure to radiation.

Angie, weakened by vomiting caused by radiation poisoning, has a miscarriage, hemorrhages, and dies. Brad, watching his wife and baby dying, draws his gun and grabs Satchel, threatening to kill him unless Hunter saves Angie; he is subdued by Jonathan who knocks him out with a shovel, and then has his hands bound.

Losing contact with the survivors in the other bunker, and hearing the attack that overwhelms them, the survivors realize that there is no help coming. Hunter notices that the others are slowly slipping away due to the radiation seeping into the basement.

Satchel develops pneumonia, and the survivors watch helplessly as he sickens and then dies. Hunter experiences intense guilt, blaming himself for using their limited supply of antibiotics to treat his own wound. Rob, accepting the inevitable, takes Satchel's body outside to bury it. He refuses to take a gun, telling Hunter that the survivors inside will need it more.

Brad, coming to terms with his grief, apologizes and is unbound by Hunter. Over the next two days, Elizabeth, Jennifer and Jonathan, beginning to lose their hair, spend most of their time sleeping, weak from radiation poisoning. Hunter and Brad, also losing hair, sit listening to movement from upstairs. Hunter tells Brad to let the others sleep, as they will need their strength to repel the coming attack. They both accept that Rob, now outside for two days, is not coming back.

The attack comes, and Hunter, realising they are vulnerable and trapped inside the basement, leads them outside after the initial wave is repelled. Now upstairs, Elizabeth is stabbed by one of the invaders and dies in Hunter's arms. Hunter, overcome with rage at Elizabeth's death, charges outside with Brad and they both attack the man who killed her. During the melee, Brad is killed saving Hunter from the attacker, who dies after being impaled on his own weapon by Hunter. Hunter staggers back to the house finding Jonathan holding a gun on him, before turning the gun on himself. Their basement now contaminated, Hunter and Jennifer stagger upstairs and curl up in a bed to sleep.

The film ends several weeks later. Only Hunter and Jennifer remain alive, seriously ill from radiation exposure, drinking contaminated water from a pump in the yard. Nearby is Rob's body, slumped against a tree, having evidently managed to bury Satchel but chosen not to return to the basement before dying of the radiation.

== Cast ==
- C. J. Thomason as Hunter
- Monica Keena as Elizabeth
- Edward Furlong as Brad
- Andre Royo as Rob
- Christine Kelly as Angie
- Jessie Rusu as Jennifer
- Ross Britz as Jonathan
- Tody Bernard as Wendell
- Kennon Kepper as Satchel
- William Baldwin as Shane (voice)
- Randal Reeder as Cowboy Hat
- Bo Mitchell as Cowboy Hat's Son
- Bobbi Sue Luther as Basement Refugee
- Ted Ferguson as Dying Refugee
- Alexander B. Williams as Burnt Refugee

== Production ==
Engert was the second director hired to direct Aftermath and he was brought on to the project four days before principal photography commenced. He stated that he chose to work on Aftermath due to the film's script, which he felt "focused on the characters a lot more than the situation they're in" and because the script did not require a large special effects budget or an overly large cast. The total production took place over a four-week period.

== Reception ==
Aftermath has received mixed reviews, and holds an approval rating of 47% on the review aggregator website Rotten Tomatoes, based on 17 reviews. Gary Goldstein of the Los Angeles Times wrote that "Even if this largely contained movie remains more low key than frantic, it features enough well-executed bursts of tension and strong emotional beats to hold interest." Adrian Halen of HorrorNews.net reviewed the film positively, writing that "Those who enjoy a good action drama will be more than satisfied with this film".

Justin Chang of Variety called the film "a work of zero novelty but often effective atmosphere". Mike Wilson of Bloody Disgusting wrote that "Aftermath strives to be different from what you'd normally get with a post-nuclear film. And while the bleakness and pessimistic outlook does change things up, it doesn't deviate from the formula we've all seen before". Jeannette Catsoulis of The New York Times gave the film a mostly negative review, writing that "it's surprising how few of these characters want to kill themselves—no matter how much we're rooting for them to do so".
