= The Eyes (2016 film) =

- Directed by: Robbie Bryan
- Written by: Robert T. Roe
- Produced by: Robbie Bryan; Spero Stamboulis; Daniel Wulkan
- Starring: Nicholas Turturro; Vincent Pastore; Megan West; Ana Isabelle; Greg Davis Jr.; Steven Hauck; Daniel Flaherty
- Cinematography: David Knox
- Edited by: Kala Mandrake
- Music by: Xiren Wang
- Production company: Good To Be Seen Films
- Distributed by: Parade Deck Films
- Release dates: 9 August 2016 (Rhode Island International Film Festival); 7 April 2017 (US)
- Running time: 95 minutes
- Country: United States
- Language: English

The Eyes is a 2016 American crime drama film directed by Robbie Bryan, starring Nicholas Turturro, Vincent Pastore, Megan West, Ana Isabelle, Greg Davis Jr., Steven Hauck and Daniel Flaherty.

== Plot ==
Six strangers are abducted and brought together in an isolated location. Using government technology, their captors reveal that each of them has previously killed someone. They are told that only one of them can survive the night, while the other five will be killed. Given two hours to determine who should live, the group must confront their pasts and decide which of them deserves to survive.

== Cast ==
- Nicholas Turturro as Charlie
- Vincent Pastore as Harry
- Megan West as Jaclyn
- Ana Isabelle as Victoria
- Greg Davis Jr. as Robby
- Steven Hauck as Arnold
- Daniel Flaherty as Jeffrey
- Carly Steel as Cynthia

== Release ==
The film was released on 7 April 2017.

== Reception ==
Noel Murray of the Los Angeles Times wrote that nearly the entire film consists of "overwritten, overacted, visually inert confrontations and monologues."

The Hollywood Reporter wrote that the film sometimes feels like a "master class in bad acting" and "would be a dud even if its format hadn't been so overused recently."
