= Bobby Tahouri =

- Born: Los Angeles, California
- Occupation: Composer

Bobby Tahouri is an American composer, musician, and record producer.

== Life and work ==
Born and raised in Los Angeles, California, Bobby Tahouri comes from a musical family, and began playing piano at the age of seven. He studied piano and composition at the San Francisco Conservatory of Music and also at the California Institute of the Arts, where he received his bachelor's degree in Music Composition. Upon graduation, Tahouri continued his studies with notable film composer Ira Newborn, who was an important mentor for Tahouri in honing his musical craft in film.

In 2008, another composer encouraged Tahouri in the next step of his career. Academy Award Winning composer Hans Zimmer invited Tahouri to be a part of Remote Control Productions, where he composed additional music and provided arrangements for many projects, including Paramount Pictures’ Iron Man, Warner Bros. Clash of the Titans, and HBO’s Game of Thrones. Tahouri has also provided additional music on many other projects, including the Emmy-Award-winning Steven Spielberg produced miniseries Into the West, DreamWorks/Paramount Pictures’ Disturbia, 20th Century Fox’s Hitman, and Universal Pictures’ Despicable Me 2, working alongside composers Geoff Zanelli and Heitor Pereira.

Tahouri scored the comedy Zero Charisma (distributed by Nerdist Industries and Tribeca Film), winner of the Audience Award at 2013’s SXSW film festival. He composed the main theme to the documentary series The Haunting Of, and collaborated with producer Rodney Jerkins on the Nickelodeon teen musical Rags, providing the orchestral score for the musical.

In the video game world, Tahouri is best known for composing the scores to Rise of the Tomb Raider and Marvel's Avengers, both developed by Crystal Dynamics. Tahouri also worked with Evanescence in 2019, co-producing and providing synth programming for the song The Chain by Fleetwood Mac, which was used in the Gears 5 video game trailer release.

== Discography ==
=== Theatrical films ===
Year	Title	Director	Notes
2009	The Conspiracy	Greg Marcks	
2009	Best Worst Movie	Michael Paul Stephenson	
2009	Across the Hall	Alex Merkin	
2009	High Society: A Pot Boiler	Kristian Davies	
2011	Husk	Brett Simmons	
2011	Trophy Kids	Josh Sugarman	
2012	Besties	Rebecca Perry Cutter	
2012	The American Scream	Michael Stephenson	
2013	Zero Charisma	Katie Graham and Andrew Matthews	
2013	Dark Circles	Paul Soter	
2013	The Monkey's Paw	Brett Simmons	
2017	Girlfriend's Day	Michael Stephenson	
2017	Altitude	Alex Merkin	
2017	Forever Faithful	Angie Ruiz	

=== Short films ===
Year	Title	Director	Notes
2006	Broken	David Wendelman	
2007	The Insect Circus	Chloe Aftel	
2012	I'm Here. Where R U?	David Wendelman	
2015	This Modern Man Is Beat	Alex Merkin	

=== Television ===
Year	Title	Notes
2012–2013	The Girl's Guide to Depravity	
2015–2020	Shimmer and Shine	
2017	House of the Witch	Directed by Alex Merkin; Television film

=== Video games ===
Year	Title	Notes
2014	Transformers: Rise of the Dark Spark	Composed with Jeff Broadbent, Steve Jablonsky and Troels Brun Folmann
2015	Rise of the Tomb Raider	
2020	Marvel's Avengers	

=== Music production ===
Year	Title	Band	Notes
2019	"The Chain"	Evanescence	Fleetwood Mac cover for Gears 5 video game
