= Husk (film) =

2011 American horror film by Brett Simmons

- Directed by: Brett Simmons
- Screenplay by: Brett Simmons
- Produced by: Stephanie Caleb; Limor Diamant; Moshe Diamant; Courtney Solomon
- Starring: Devon Graye; Wes Chatham; C. J. Thomason; Tammin Sursok; Ben Easter; Joshua Skipworth; Nick Toussaint; Mike Cornelison; Aaron Harpold; Candice Mara Rose
- Music by: Bobby Tahouri
- Production company: After Dark Films
- Release date: January 28, 2011
- Running time: 83 minutes
- Country: United States
- Language: English
- Budget: $382,262

Husk is a 2011 American supernatural horror film. It stars Devon Graye, C. J. Thomason, Tammin Sursok and Ben Easter. It was directed by Brett Simmons and was one of eight films released in 2011 as part of After Dark Films' premiere of their "After Dark Originals" sub-label.

== Plot ==
Awakening after a murder of crows causes them to veer off the road, Chris, Scott, Brian, and Natalie discover their friend Johnny is missing. Natalie and Chris stay with the car while Brian and Scott enter a cornfield to search a nearby farmhouse. In the field, they find a scarecrow mounted in a clearing and a rusted and derelict car, with its windshield covered in crow carcasses. They arrive at the abandoned and dilapidated farmhouse and are drawn to a light shining from an upstairs window. Meanwhile, Natalie sees a figure run into the cornfield and chases after him. She stumbles upon a scarecrow concealing human remains and runs to find the others. Brian and Scott find Johnny's reanimated corpse in an upstairs room, stitching pieces of burlap together with an antique sewing machine. He stops when the room goes dark, and Natalie's screams are heard outside. Chris sees Alex attack and drag her into the cornfield, where Brian and Chris find Natalie's body strung up like a scarecrow in the clearing. Chris flees in terror after seeing a strange light enter Natalie's eyes. Brian tackles a scarecrow as Alex ambushes him and stabs his shoulder before vanishing into the cornfield.

At the house, Brian blames Chris for Natalie's death and leaves with Scott to search for a way back to the road. Upon entering the barn, Scott experiences a flashback of Farmer Comstock physically abusing his teenage son in front of his brother, but Brian doesn't see anything. At the house, he's lured back to the sewing room by the young boy Natalie saw earlier. Natalie's reanimated corpse walks in and begins sewing a scarecrow mask from scraps of burlap. Chris tries to leave, but the door's stuck. Brian and Scott hear his cries for help, but find the room empty and Chris unconscious outside.

Scott is lured into the cornfield and experiences another flashback of Corey Comstock murdering his brother Alex with a pitchfork and staging his remains as a scarecrow as the soil absorbs his blood.

Scott snaps back to reality in the clearing. A Scarecrow attacks Scott, tearing at him with nails driven into its hands, before Brian smashes its head in with an axe. He helps Scott back to the farmhouse, where Chris admits that he and Natalie had also seen a young boy. While Brian searches the house, Chris tries to convince Scott that Brian is unstable and that they should leave together in the truck parked in the barn. Scott refuses and leaves to find Brian in the house.

In the cellar, Scott and Brian find Corey's remains holding a shotgun, indicating Corey died by suicide. Outside, Chris hot-wires the truck and drives through the cornfield only to be assaulted by several Scarecrows. Brian saves him with Corey's shotgun, but is killed by Scarecrow Natalie when he can't bring himself to shoot her. Chris returns to the house as Scott theorizes that Alex Comstock is the spirit haunting the cornfield, and that the only time they're safe is when Alex possesses a new victim's body, since he can only occupy one body at a time. While Alex possesses Brian, Chris, and Scott plan to burn down the cornfield. Alex arrives before they can finish and attacks them with numerous Scarecrows. Chris kills several with the shotgun before he and Scott agree to split up to have better chances of survival. As Chris makes his way to the road, he is attacked by Scarecrow Brian and impaled on a fence post. He tears Brian's mask in two, breaking Alex's hold over him, only to hear another possessed Scarecrow closing in. Scott tries to set fire to the field, but Alex knocks him unconscious.

Scott awakens in the clearing where Chris is mounted on a cross-frame post. Remembering the flashbacks, Scott finds the pitchfork Corey used to murder Alex and stabs him with it. When Alex gets back up, Chris grabs him so Scott can escape. Alex murders Chris and chases after Scott. He emerges from the cornfield and collapses due to his injuries. A car drives up, and a couple searches the SUV for survivors, but Scott is unable to get their attention. Alex emerges from the cornfield and looks back at Scott with a sinister glance as the couple sees him lying near the road before the credits roll.

== Cast ==
- C. J. Thomason as Chris
- Devon Graye as Scott
- Wes Chatham as Brian
- Tammin Sursok as Natalie
- Ben Easter as Johnny
- Joshua Skipworth as Corey Comstock
- Nick Toussaint as Alex Comstock
- Mike Cornelison as Farmer Comstock
- Aaron Harpold as Local Farmer
- Candice Mara Rose as Road Farmer's Wife

== Production ==
Husk began production as a short film in 2003 that saw its premiere at the 2005 Sundance Film Festival, where it was well received. Director Brett Simmons’ agent then sent the feature length script to After Dark with the short film serving as the pitch for the feature, which was something that Simmons intended when he wrote the short. In an interview with Bloody Disgusting, Simmons said that After Dark gave him plenty of control over the production of his script and the story being told. Filming for the feature length version of the film began in August 2009, with production wrapping 6 years to the day that shooting began for the short film. Simmons cited other scarecrow-themed horror films like Dark Night of the Scarecrow and Jeepers Creepers for serving as his inspiration, though he described the scarecrows in this film as "predators in their natural habitat...they’re Jaws, and you’re in the water".

=== Release ===
The film saw its premiere in 2011, released theatrically for a brief time on January 28 along with seven other films produced under the After Dark Originals moniker. It was released shortly after on DVD, distributed by Lionsgate and on Blu-ray, distributed by Cinematic Vision.
