= Troll 2 =

1990 film by Claudio Fragasso

- Re-release poster
- Directed by: Claudio Fragasso (Note: Fragasso was credited under the pseudonym Drake Floyd.)
- Screenplay by: Claudio Fragasso
- Story by: Rossella Drudi; Claudio Fragasso
- Produced by: Brenda Norris; Joe D'Amato
- Starring: Michael Stephenson; George Hardy; Connie McFarland; Jason Wright
- Cinematography: Giancarlo Ferrando
- Edited by: Vania Friends
- Music by: Carlo Maria Cordio
- Production company: Filmirage
- Distributed by: Epic Productions
- Release date: 12 October 1990 (US)
- Running time: 95 minutes
- Country: Italy
- Language: English
- Budget: $100,000

Troll 2 (or Goblins) is a 1990 English-language Italian independent comedy horror film written and directed by Claudio Fragasso under the pseudonym Drake Floyd. It stars Michael Stephenson, George Hardy, Connie McFarland, and Jason Wright. The plot follows Joshua Waits as he tries to save his family after the spirit of his deceased grandfather warns him that the town of Nilbog, where the family is spending their vacation, is inhabited by goblins who turn people into plant matter to eat them.

Although produced under the original title Goblins, American distributors marketed it as a sequel to the 1986 horror film Troll. However, the films are unrelated and Troll 2 features goblins rather than trolls. The film was produced by Filmirage; development was rife with difficulties, largely due to the language barrier between the Italian-speaking crew and English-speaking cast, and producer Joe D'Amato's approach to low-budget filmmaking.

It was released on October 12, 1990, by Epic Productions in the United States. Troll 2 received a near-universal negative reception and many have considered it to be one of the worst films of all time. In subsequent years, the film has gained a cult following. Though it was generally viewed as a poorly made horror film, the filmmakers stated that it was "always intended to be a comic film." Stephenson later directed the critically acclaimed 2009 documentary Best Worst Movie about the production and subsequent popularity of Troll 2.

== Plot ==
Michael Waits dreams of being a farmer, so he arranges a home exchange vacation in the rural farming community of Nilbog for a month. Before they leave, Michael's son Joshua is contacted by the ghost of his dead grandfather, Seth, who warns him that evil vegetarian goblins seek to transform humans into plants by feeding them poisoned food or drink in order to eat them. He also informs him that they can freely assume human form for disguise. Meanwhile, Holly's boyfriend, Elliot Cooper, decides to go with them along with his friends Arnold, Brent and Drew.

After arriving at Nilbog, they meet their strange and aloof exchange family, the Presents. There, Joshua destroys all of the poisoned food with help from Seth's ghost, by urinating over the families' dinner. Arnold goes for a walk and witnesses goblins pursuing a girl. When Arnold approaches and insults them, they respond by throwing a spear into his chest. They flee to a chapel, where they encounter the goblins' queen, druid witch Creedence Leonore Gielgud, who uses the "Stonehenge Magic Stone" to give the goblins power. Creedence tricks them into drinking a magic potion that dissolves the girl into vegetable matter, which the goblins eat; Arnold witnesses this, exclaiming "Oh my God!", before being transformed into a tree.

The following morning, Michael and Joshua go to buy food. Joshua enters the local church, and the parishioners capture him and attempt to force-feed him poisonous ice cream. Later, Drew goes to town because there is nothing to eat in the RV. The sheriff takes him in his car and gives him a green hamburger. When they arrive in town, Drew goes to the store and drinks poisonous Nilbog milk, which causes him to feel dizzy. He goes to a chapel and finds Arnold, who has been transformed into a tree. Drew drags him out, but Creedence appears and uses a chainsaw to cut Arnold into pieces and make his remains into a smoothie for Drew, who is then killed off-screen.

During a surprise party arranged by the townspeople, Seth and Joshua try to cause a distraction using a molotov cocktail, but the priest captures them and recites a spell that banishes Seth's soul to hell. However, before he vanishes, Seth summons a bolt of lightning from the sky, which ignites the cocktail and kills the priest. When Michael extinguishes his burning corpse, his true goblin form is revealed, and the villagers turn on the Waits, revealing themselves to be goblins. The Waits and Elliot retreat to the house, where the villagers surround them and hold them hostage.

Creedence travels to Elliot's RV, where she seduces Brent and drowns him in popcorn. Meanwhile, Joshua, Elliot, Holly, Michael, and Diana hold a séance to communicate with Seth, who returns from the dead and informs them he can retain a physical form for ten minutes before he must return to the afterlife. The goblins break into the house and transport Joshua to Creedence's chapel, where Joshua encounters Seth, who hands him a paper bag containing a "secret weapon" to use against the goblins, and attempts to destroy the magic stone, but vanishes before he can. Creedence and the goblins arrive and attack Joshua, but Joshua opens the bag, revealing a "double-decker bologna sandwich" before Creedence can force-feed him poisonous green slime. He eats the sandwich, making his body poisonous to the goblins; he then touches the Stonehenge Stone, along with his family and Elliot, which destroys Creedence and all of the goblins present.

The family returns home, where Joshua's mother eats food from the refrigerator, which was poisoned by the family of goblins who took over their home during their exchange in the country. Joshua walks in on a group of goblins eating the body of his now-dead mother, who offer him a bite as he screams in horror.

== Cast ==
- Michael Stephenson as Joshua Waits
- George Hardy as Michael Waits
- Margo Prey as Diana Waits
- Connie McFarland as Holly Waits
- Robert Ormsby as Grandpa Seth
- Deborah Reed as Creedence Leonore Gielgud
- Jason Wright as Elliot Cooper
- Darren Ewing as Arnold
- Jason Steadman as Drew
- David McConnell as Brent
- Gary Carlston as Sheriff Gene Freak
- Mike Hamill as Bells
- Don Packard as Sandy Mahar
- Christina Reynolds as Cindy
- Glenn Gerner as Peter
- Michele Abrams as Wood Tales Girl
- Lance C. Williams as Mr. Presents
- Elli Case as Mrs. Presents
- Gavin Reed as Presents Son
- Melissa Bridge as Presents Daughter
- Jake McDorman as a background character seen mysteriously on screen in 3 different scenes.
- Paul and Patrick Gibbs as Goblin (Uncredited)
- Steve Hatch as Goblin (Uncredited)

== Production ==
The script was originally titled Goblins and began as a way for director Claudio Fragasso's wife, Rosella Drudi, to express her frustration with several of her friends becoming vegetarians, which she claimed "pissed [her] off". The film was produced by Eduard Sarlui and Joe D'Amato, an Italian exploitation film director notorious for his stated view that the profitability of films was more important than their entertainment value. D'Amato worked under the pseudonym "David Hills". In keeping with D'Amato's production philosophy, many components of the film were created for little to no money, such as the costumes that were designed by D'Amato's longtime friend and frequent collaborator Laura Gemser.

The film was shot on location in Morgan and Porterville, Utah in the summer of 1989; a large "M" erected in the mountains outlying Morgan is visible in some shots. The production crew was made up almost entirely of non-English-speaking Italians brought to America by Fragasso; the only fluent English speaker on set was Gemser. Fragasso and his crew largely relied on a broken pidgin English to communicate with the cast, who recalled not being able to understand much of what went on.

The cast had few experienced actors and was primarily assembled from residents of nearby towns who responded to an open casting call, hoping to win roles as extras. George Hardy was a dentist with no acting experience who showed up for fun, only to be given one of the film's largest speaking roles. Don Packard, who played the store owner, was actually a patient at a nearby mental hospital, and was cast for—and subsequently filmed—his role while on a day trip. He later recalled that he had smoked an enormous amount of marijuana prior to filming, had no idea what was happening around him, and that his disturbed "performance" in the film was not acting.

Drudi and Fragasso have stated that their intentions have been misunderstood, as the strongly criticized aspects of the film are intentionally comic and exaggerated, such as Creedence's theatrical acting or the preacher's monologue on eating meat.

As neither Fragasso nor Drudi spoke fluent English, the shooting script was written in the same broken dialect in which they both spoke; the cast would later recall that the script was only given to them scene-by-scene and that they had difficulty understanding their dialogue as written. Some of the cast members offered to correct their lines to sound more grammatically and syntactically correct but said that Fragasso demanded they deliver their lines verbatim. Despite the majority of the cast attesting to the same story, Fragasso has vehemently denied their version of events; he once reacted angrily to a panel discussion being conducted by the cast, calling the actors "dogs" (Italian for "bad actors") and accusing them of lying about their experiences.

=== Soundtrack ===
The film's soundtrack was composed by Carlo Maria Cordio and was played entirely on Roland D-50 and Korg M1 synthesizers, consisting of a few brief themes repeated over and over, including a sped-up M1 demo track. In 2017, the complete score was released on CD, LP and cassette by Lunaris Records.

CD track listing
No.	Title	Length
1.	"Like an Emerald Green"	2:21
2.	"Goblins Are Coming"	1:16
3.	"Wrapped in Dreams"	1:26
4.	"Through the Mirror"	2:41
5.	"Green Nightmare"	2:51
6.	"Black Sense of the Fear"	2:21
7.	"Desperate Sprint in the Forest"	2:06
8.	"The Witch of Popcorn"	3:56
9.	"Na-Na Song"	4:06
10.	"Shadow in the House"	2:06
11.	"A Green Pottage"	1:06
12.	"They Are Not Farmers"	3:06
13.	"Wail of Terror"	1:11
14.	"Can I Help You"	1:11
15.	"Eaten Like Green Sauce"	2:21
16.	"Green Jam Sandwich"	1:01
17.	"Tennessee Roads"	3:51
18.	"The Welcome Cake of Prudence"	2:56
19.	"Grandpa Fairytales"	3:16
20.	"Carousel of Vegetables"	1:11
21.	"Do You Want Some, Joshua"	2:26
22.	"Don't Eat Green Food"	2:46
23.	"Tomorrow Nightmare"	3:01
24.	"The Horror of It All"	3:36
25.	"Goblin's World"	3:16

== Release ==
=== Home media ===
In 2003, the film was released on DVD by MGM in a Dual Layer version, packaged with the first 1986 Troll film, under the title Troll/Troll². MGM rereleased Troll 2 on DVD and Blu-ray in the United States on 5 October 2010, in honor of the 20th anniversary of the film's release. Scream Factory released a double feature Blu-ray of Troll and Troll 2 on 17 November 2015. The first 5,000 copies included a DVD of Best Worst Movie, the documentary about the production and legacy of Troll 2.

== Reception ==
Troll 2 received almost universally negative critical reception from critics, and has come to be regarded by the public as one of the worst films ever made. On Rotten Tomatoes, the film holds an approval rating of 13% based on 24 reviews with a weighted average rating of 2.4/10. The critical consensus simply reads "Oh my god." in reference to the film's most infamous scene. The acting and dialogue have become notorious for their camp value. The scene in which the character Arnold (portrayed by Darren Ewing) yells that he will be eaten next has become an Internet meme, often appearing in videos alongside the "Garbage Day" meme from Silent Night, Deadly Night Part 2. In terms of audience participation, Troll 2 has been compared to the film The Rocky Horror Picture Show, and the two films have been screened together.

J.R. Jones, a reviewer on Chicago Reader, gave the film a negative review and said "The script is stupid, the acting is wooden, the special effects are laughable, the vintage-80s synthesizer score is cheesy. The movie's paranoid premise is boiled down from two superior sci-fi movies, Invasion of the Body Snatchers (1956) and The Day of the Triffids (1962). And there are no trolls." A staff member on TV Guide also gave the film a negative review, stating that "Any attempt to obscure the names of those involved in the making of this fiasco can only be construed as an act of mercy. Troll 2 is really as bad as they come."

In 2007, a Troll 2-themed event named the "Nilbog Invasion" took place in Morgan, Utah, where part of the film had been shot.

== Documentary ==
The child star of Troll 2, Michael Stephenson, directed Best Worst Movie, a documentary about the film and its cult status. The film debuted on 14 March 2009, at the Alamo Drafthouse South Lamar in Austin, Texas, as part of the South by Southwest film festival. Several cast members from Troll 2 attended the premiere. The screening was followed by a showing of Troll 2. The documentary also screened at major film festivals across the world including the AFI Fest and Sheffield Doc/Fest. A screening at the Tower Theater in Salt Lake City included appearances from much of the cast.

The film won Best Feature Documentary (as voted by the official jury), as well as the Audience Choice for Best Documentary Feature at the 11th annual Sidewalk Moving Picture Festival in September 2009. It was released in spring 2010 and distributed by Area 23 A.

ABC's Nightline ran a segment on Troll 2 and Best Worst Movie in May 2010, including interviews with Hardy and Stephenson.

== Sequel ==
After Troll 2 was released on home video, some regional distributors continued to build on the success of the previous Troll, distributing two films as sequels: Quest for the Mighty Sword and The Crawlers (also known as Troll 3 or Contamination .7). The former film, featuring a hobgoblin using the same goblin suit from Troll 2, was also known as Troll 3 (in Germany, it was released as Troll – Das Schwert der Macht and Troll – Teil 3).

At the Nilbog Invasion, Fragasso and writer Drudi announced plans for a sequel to Troll 2, and the audience was polled for their opinion on what the film should be called. The winning title was Troll 2: Part 2. Fragasso later asked Stephenson to appear in the sequel. However, in 2009, Fragasso said he was no longer interested in directing the film.

The official Troll 2 sequel Under ConTroll premiered 11 October 2019, in Dallas, with a subsequent home media release on 6 October 2020. This film sees George Hardy reprise his role as Michael Waits and stars Eva Habermann as Vanessa Majer, a woman who is possessed by a troll. The film was directed by Eric Dean Hordes, who co-wrote the screenplay with Alexander König and Simon Hauschild.

== See also ==
- List of 20th century films considered the worst
