= Detour (2013 film) =

- Film poster
- Directed by: William Dickerson
- Written by: William Dickerson; Dwight Moody
- Produced by: Diane Becker; Carrie LeGrand; Melanie Miller
- Starring: Neil Hopkins; Brea Grant; John Forest; Ptolemy Slocum; Deb Snyder
- Cinematography: Robert Kraetsch
- Edited by: Kirk M. Morri
- Music by: Henning Lohner
- Production companies: Fishbowl Films; Level 1 Entertainment
- Distributed by: Gravitas Ventures
- Release date: March 23, 2013
- Running time: 87 minutes
- Country: United States
- Language: English

Detour is a 2013 American thriller film directed by William Dickerson, and written by Dwight Moody and Dickerson.

== Plot ==
Jackson Alder awakes to find he has been buried alive inside his Jeep after being hit by a mudslide. He tries to open his window to see how high the mudslide is, but soil starts pouring into his car, so he quickly rolls up the window.

Soon after, his sunroof starts caving in, but he manages to stop it from collapsing using tape and a steering wheel lock. He instantly drinks his remaining water and regrets it, as it was all the water he had left. He draws a cross on the back of a seat and starts praying.

Later, when water starts dripping through the cracks of the sunroof, Jackson makes a funnel out of one of his credit cards and props the empty water bottle below where the water is dripping from. He takes apart a camping chair and attempts to slide the pole through a small hole in the sunroof, but it doesn't work, so he scrunches up a newspaper to cover the hole.

Roping twine through the pole with a bottle cap, he attempts to force it through the sunroof to measure how deep he is beneath the surface. The pole pushes through the mud, and after much difficulty, he pushes through the surface, letting him calculate that he is 3 meters from the surface.

He attempts to create smoke so rescuers can find him, so he scrunches up some paper and sets it alight. The fire burns out of control after he accidentally drops it, but he manages to extinguish it. The car shakes suddenly, and mud starts filling the pole, causing it to hit his head and make him pass out.

When he wakes up, he discovers his car, now partially covered in mud, and a wound to his head. He improvises a bandage from his button shirt and wraps it around his head, securing it with his belt.

He attempts to stop the mud from filling the car further. Finally gathering the courage to climb through the mud, he strips down to his underwear and rubs motor oil all over his body to make the escape easier. With the spare tire on his body for air, he manages to escape through the sunroof and dig through the soil to freedom. The film ends as Jackson climbs to the surface, with a view of the city in the background.

== Cast ==
- Neil Hopkins as Jackson
- Brea Grant as Laurie
- Ptolemy Slocum as Preston
- John Forest as Terry
- Deb Snyder as Didi
