= My Big Fat Independent Movie =

- Theatrical release poster
- Directed by: Philip Zlotorynski
- Written by: Chris Gore; Adam Schwartz
- Produced by: Chris Gore
- Starring: Pauly Shore; Jason Mewes; Clint Howard; Paget Brewster; Brian Krow
- Cinematography: Scott Peck
- Edited by: Philip Zlotorynski
- Music by: Joe Kraemer
- Distributed by: Anchor Bay Entertainment
- Release date: September 30, 2005
- Running time: 80 minutes
- Country: United States
- Language: English
- Budget: $3 million
- Box office: $12,155,249

My Big Fat Independent Movie is a 2005 American independent parody comedy film produced and written by former film critic Chris Gore and directed by Philip Zlotorynski. It is a parody of well-known independent films, such as My Big Fat Greek Wedding, Memento, Swingers, Pulp Fiction, Magnolia, Amélie, Reservoir Dogs, Pi, The Good Girl, Run Lola Run, Clerks and El Mariachi. My Big Fat Independent Movie was eventually acquired by Anchor Bay Entertainment distribution and the film was released on DVD. Broadcast cable rights were picked up by CBS Corporation for Showtime, The Movie Channel and Sundance Channel.

== Plot ==
The movie opens with a black man molesting a white man who has trouble remembering events for more than 15 minutes at a time. The film then cuts forward in time to two talkative hitmen, Sam (Neil Barton) and Harvey (Eric Hoffman), who mistakenly believe Johnny Vince (Darren Keefe), a hipper-than-thou swingin' hepcat and Memento Guy (Brian Krow) to band trombone player, to be the third member of their gang, assembled by their evil crime boss to pull a "botched robbery" in Las Vegas. Along the way, they take a beautiful demented hostage – the lovely, desperate and lonely cashier Julianne (Paget Brewster). They are unaware that she will forever change their pathetic lives. During the journey, the foursome encounter a variety of characters inspired by famous independent films, including a bald genius, a forgetful thug, a jogging red-head, a bound and gagged girl, rabbis on a mission, many lesbians, Project Greenlight's Pete Jones, a crazed though well-dressed mechanic (Clint Howard), a horny answering machine (Jason Mewes), a naive mariachi, an obnoxious practical-joking love-struck French girl, and finally Pauly Shore as himself.

== Reception ==
My Big Fat Independent Movie earned $12,155,249 in global box office receipts during its world-wide run with an estimated budget of around $3,000,000. The film was poorly received by the consensus of critics who reviewed the film, receiving a low 23% rotten rating over at Rotten Tomatoes. Internet debate soon erupted over the film's lowbrow treatment of independent film classics and caused backlash from die-hard independent film fans. Chris Parry, entertainment journalist and film critic for efilmcritic.com, found that the movie targeted films that were too well liked by its intended audience, and a larger (more mainstream) audience wouldn't recognize the referenced films.

Controversy over the film ensued after the producer's former publication "Filmthreat" (who co-produced the film) gave the movie a perfect 5 star review. In light of the controversy and public backlash, the company distanced itself from the movie. Before its limited domestic release, the film had been pre-screened on the festival circuit including Cinequest, South by Southwest, San Diego Film Festival, Sidewalk Moving Picture Festival, Newport Beach Film Festival, Worldfest Houston, and the Temecula Valley Film Festival.
