= Chiller (TV network) =

Former American television network

- Headquarters: 30 Rockefeller Plaza, New York City, New York, U.S.

Programming
- Picture format: 480i (SDTV); 1080i (HDTV)

Ownership
- Owner: NBCUniversal Cable Entertainment Group; (NBCUniversal / Comcast)

History
- Launched: March 1, 2007; 19 years ago
- Closed: December 31, 2017; 8 years ago

Links
- Website: http://chillertv.com at the Wayback Machine (archived December 30, 2017)

Chiller was an American cable and satellite television network owned by NBCUniversal Cable Entertainment Group subsidiary of NBCUniversal, all owned by Comcast. Chiller specialized in horror, thriller and suspense programming, mainly films. It also operated its own film production company.

As of February 2015, 38,820,000 American households (33.4% of households with television) received Chiller, though this declined with later removals by several cable services as carriage agreements expired.

The channel ceased operations on December 31, 2017.

== History ==
On January 12, 2007, NBCUniversal announced the launch of Chiller on March 1, dedicated to films and television shows related to the horror genre. The company also stated that, aside from their own content, Chiller would feature content from competing film studios, including Lionsgate, Sony, Warner Bros., and 20th Century Fox. In February 2007, The 101, channel 101 on DirecTV, aired a "preview" of Chiller, featuring the pilot episodes of Twin Peaks and American Gothic, as well as various horror movies and programs. Sleuth, NBC Universal's mystery-themed network, later known as Cloo, aired a fourteen-hour movie marathon entitled "Chiller On Sleuth" to promote the launch of Chiller. The channel officially launched at 6:00 am Eastern/5:00 am Central on March 1. After a brief introduction to the channel, Chiller aired its first program, Alfred Hitchcock Presents.

On July 30, 2014, its carriage was merged with that of its former competitor Fearnet, a network launched by Comcast in 2006 as a video on demand service six years before their purchase of NBC Universal.

=== Carriage decline and closure ===
In 2017, NBCUniversal began to eliminate some of its non-prime networks in NBCU's cable portfolio by closing or rebranding these networks. Cloo closed on February 1, 2017, along with Esquire Network on June 28, and Universal HD was rebranded as the Olympic Channel on July 14.

On February 1, 2017 (the same day sister network Cloo shut down), Dish removed Chiller from the lineup, which cited that most of the network's rerun-centric programming was duplicative of that available on other networks and streaming services, with Charter Communications (Spectrum, Time Warner Cable and Bright House Networks subsidiaries) removing the network along with Esquire Network on April 25 for the same reason. Five months later on October 2, 2017, Verizon FiOS discontinued carriage of the channel, while Mediacom quietly removed the channel from their lineup on October 23.

On November 8, 2017, Cox removed the channel from its lineup when it refused to continue their carriage of Chiller within their new carriage agreements with NBCUniversal Cable Entertainment Group, removing the network from several Cox regional outlets.

On November 16, 2017, NBCUniversal Cable Networks confirmed that the channel would be closing on December 31. Google Fiber dropped Chiller from its lineup on December 20, which left DirecTV and AT&T U-Verse as two of the last remaining providers to carry Chiller until its closure. A year-end ratings recap showed Chiller as ranked 127 out of 136 networks, averaging 36,000 viewers a night.

The network officially signed off at 11:59 p.m. ET on December 31 after an airing of The Babadook with a simple message saying "Thank you for watching Chiller. GOOD NIGHT!".

== Programming ==
=== Originals ===
On December 17, 2010, Chiller premiered Chiller 13: The Decade's Scariest Movie Moments. The countdown special featured a diverse group of pop culture mavens and horror movie experts looking back on the top 13 scary movie moments between 2000 and 2010. Show participants include renowned special makeup effects supervisor Greg Nicotero (The Walking Dead), comedians Dan Gurewitch and David Young (CollegeHumor), actress Betsy Russell (the Saw films), writer Steve Niles, Tony Todd and horror film director Lucky McKee among others. In October 2011, Chiller continued the franchise with Chiller 13: Horror's Creepiest Kids.

In December 2011, Chiller premiered its first original movie entitled Remains, based on the IDW Publishing comic book by Steve Niles and Kieron Dwyer.

On March 4, 2016, Chiller premiered its only original television series entitled Slasher. Netflix acquired the licensing rights to the series after the first season.

=== Acquired programs ===
Chiller's acquired slate included genre films, international series (Afterlife, Apparitions), non-scripted programs (Fear Factor), and anthology shows (Masters of Horror).

In July 2015, the channel aired a weekly anime block. The weekly block aired from midnight to 2:00 am on Wednesdays, but was summarily cancelled due to poor ratings. Anime shows that aired on the block included Tokyo Majin, Devil May Cry: The Animated Series, Is This a Zombie?, and Black Blood Brothers.

=== Dare 2 Direct Film Festivals ===
In October 2007, Chiller announced its "Dare 2 Direct Film Festival" which premiered on Halloween night. Viewers uploaded 300 short films and the winners aired on this original special.

Chiller renewed its Dare 2 Direct Film Festival in 2008, which aired on Halloween night. The channel premiered webisodes of an original film, "The Hills Are Alive" from Tim Burton protégé Caroline Thompson (co-screenwriter of Corpse Bride and screenwriter of Edward Scissorhands) in July on chillertv.com, and aired the complete film as its first original film in October.

== Chiller Films ==

Chiller Films was a film production company based in New York that specialized in indie horror and thriller films. It was launched in 2011, to give select Chiller movies limited theatrical runs and nationwide VOD distribution, using a simultaneous, or "day-and date" film release strategy. The films were released in a limited number of small and multiplex theaters in large markets, along with release on video on demand through cable providers and online film retailers the same day. Most of the films are from independent filmmakers who then license their properties to Chiller Films. Chiller Films quietly closed in December 2017, alongside the closure of the Chiller channel it was connected to.

| Title | Year | Production Co. |
|---|---|---|
| Remains | 2012 | Chiller Films; IDW Publishing |
| The American Scream | 2012 | Chiller Films; Brainstorm Media |
| Dead Souls | 2012 | Chiller Films; Synthetic Productions |
| Ghoul | 2012 | Chiller Films; Modernciné |
| Beneath | 2013 | Glass Eye Pix |
| Chilling Visions: 5 Senses of Fear | 2013 | Chiller Films; Synthetic Cinema International |
| The Monkey's Paw | 2013 | TMP Films |
| Animal | 2014 | Flower Films; Synthetic Cinema International |
| Deep in the Darkness | 2014 | Chiller Films; Synthetic Cinema International |
| The Boy | 2015 | SpectreVision |
| SiREN | 2016 | Studio71 |
| Camera Obscura | 2017 | Chiller Films; Hood River Entertainment; Paper Street Pictures |
| Dementia 13 | 2017 | Pipeline Entertainment; Haloran LLC |
