= C. J. Thomason =

American model and actor (born 1982)

Christopher John Thomason
- Born: December 6, 1982 (age 42); Abilene, Texas, United States
- Occupation: Actor
- Years active: 2001–present
- Known for: Harper's Island, horror film roles
- Spouse: Irina Dragomir (m. 2010)

Christopher John Thomason (born December 6, 1982) is an American model and actor. He is best known for his role as Jimmy Mance in the 2009 television series Harper's Island and his subsequent roles in horror films.

== Early life ==
Thomason was born in Abilene, Texas. After graduating in 2001, he moved to Los Angeles to begin his acting career.

== Career ==
Thomason had recurring roles in the television shows For The People and General Hospital, and he guest starred in Boston Public, CSI: NY and What About Brian. Thomason starred in Harper's Island in the role of Jimmy Mance and the horror films Husk (2011), The Monkey's Paw (2013) and Aftermath.

== Filmography ==
=== Film ===
Year	Title	Role
2015	Aftermath	Hunter
2013	The Monkey's Paw	Jake Tilton
2011	Husk	Chris
2009	Sutures	Ben
2008	Jane Doe: Eye of the Beholder	Valet
2007	Transformers	Sailor
2007	Jane Doe: Ties That Bind	Valet
2001	The Brotherhood II: Young Warlocks	Marcus Ratner

=== Television ===
Year	Title	Role	Notes
2009	Harper's Island	Jimmy Mance	lead role
2006	What About Brian	Albert Miller	guest star
2006	CSI: NY	Patrick Thompson	guest star
2003	Boston Public	Eddie Jr.	guest star
2002–2003	General Hospital	Lucas Jones	recurring role
2002	For The People	Rafe	recurring role

=== Theatre ===
- This Is Theatre This Is Film
- Bridge To Terabithia
- Death Of A Salesman
- Lil' Abner
- It Runs In The Family
- With A Glass Of Water
