= Philip Zlotorynski =

American filmmaker (born 1975)

Philip Scott Zlotorynski (born 1975) is an American filmmaker.

== Early career ==
Zlotorynski graduated with honors from California State University, Northridge with a degree in film and television production in 1997. He spent two years as head of the Trailer Department for Roger Corman's Concorde-New Horizons.

== Career ==
After completing the dramatic short Sway in 2001, Zlotorynski went to work on his next short project Walkentalk which gained some notoriety on the festival circuit. My Big Fat Independent Movie marked his feature directorial debut with film journalist Chris Gore. However the film was a box office bomb, earning only $4,655 in box office receipts during its worldwide run, with a production budget of $3,000,000. The film was panned by critics, receiving a low 23% "rotten" rating at Rotten Tomatoes.

The film was rejected by most major film festivals, but played at other festivals with mixed results. It screened at Cinequest, South by Southwest, San Diego Film Festival, Sidewalk Moving Picture Festival, Newport Beach Film Festival, Worldfest Houston and the Temecula Valley Film Festival, where it won Best Feature.

A firestorm of internet debate soon erupted over the film's lowbrow treatment of independent film classics and, as a result, the movie suffered a backlash from die-hard independent film fans, many of which considered the film to be blasphemous toward the genre.

Chris Parry, entertainment journalist and film critic for efilmcritic.com, found that the movie targeted films that were too well liked by its intended audience, and a larger audience would not recognize the referenced films.

Zlotorynski co-wrote the dark comedy "Girlfriends Day" with "Mr. Show" alumnus Eric Hoffman. Zlotorynski is a co-executive producer of the thriller "In/Sight" directed by Richard Gabai.

== Filmography ==
- Girlfriend's Day (2016) - Writer
- In/Sight (2011) - Co-Executive Producer
- Served (2007) - Director/Producer
- My Big Fat Independent Movie (2005) - Director/Editor
- Walkentalk (2003) - Director/Producer/Writer/Editor
- Sway (2001) - Director/Producer/Writer/Editor
- Thunderpoint (1998) - Director/Producer/Editor
- The Seventh Day (1997) - Director/Writer
