= The American Scream =

- Film poster
- Directed by: Michael Stephenson
- Produced by: Michael Stephenson; Lindsay Stephenson; Rod Olson; Meyer Shartzstien; Zack Carlson
- Starring: Victor Bariteau; Matthew Brodeur; Richard Brodeur; Manny Souza; Lori Souza
- Cinematography: Katie Graham
- Edited by: Andrew Matthews
- Music by: Bobby Tahouri
- Production company: Brainstorm Media
- Distributed by: Brainstorm Media; Chiller Films
- Release date: September 23, 2012
- Running time: 92 minutes
- Country: United States
- Language: English

The American Scream is a 2012 American documentary film profiling three families in Fairhaven, Massachusetts, who transform their homes into extravagant haunted attractions for Halloween. Produced and directed by Michael Stephenson, the film premiered on the Chiller network October 28, 2012. The recent growth of the "home haunter" phenomenon is linked to the influence of the Internet as well as the Haunted Attraction National Tradeshow and Convention (HAuNTcon).

== Reception ==
The American Scream received positive reviews. On Rotten Tomatoes, the film has a 100% approval rating, based on 9 reviews. According to Fred Topel of CraveOnline, the film "is really well done and has a lot of heart."

The film effortlessly toes the line between observational and compassionate, whilst Bobby Tahouri's score is at once jovial and joyously creepy, succeeding in drawing the audience into the foray of Halloween excitement. Katie-Jane Hall of Critics Associated said, "The real heart of this feature is the families; they sacrifice and support each other through thick and thin, allowing their lives and their homes to be enveloped by a mass of pumpkins, zombies, skeletons and fake blood all for the joy of others. Their passion is contagious and I would be surprised if it does not inspire some more amateur haunters to spring up out of the woodwork."

== Release ==
The American Scream premiered on September 23, 2012, at the Fantastic Fest at the Alamo Drafthouse in Austin, Texas. On October 10, 2012, The American Scream premiered for a limited audience at the Walter Silveira Auditorium in Fairhaven, MA.

=== Television ===
On October 31, 2012, The American Scream was broadcast nationally on Chiller.

=== Box office ===
In November 2012, The American Scream was released to theaters nationwide.

== Home media ==
In December 2012, The American Scream was released on DVD. It is also available on Netflix, YouTube, and I-Tunes.
