= Zero Charisma =

- Directed by: Katie Graham; Andrew Matthews
- Written by: Andrew Matthews
- Produced by: Ezra Venetos; Thomas Fernandes
- Starring: Sam Eidson; Anne Gee Byrd; Brock England; Garrett Graham; Cyndi Williams
- Cinematography: Ellie Ann Fenton
- Music by: Bobby Tahouri
- Production company: Shark Films Magic Stone Productions
- Distributed by: Tribeca Film; Nerdist Industries
- Release date: October 11, 2013
- Running time: 1 hour 28 minutes
- Country: United States
- Language: English

Zero Charisma is a 2013 American comedy film written by Andrew Matthews and co-directed by Matthews and Katie Graham. It stars Sam Eidson, Anne Gee Byrd, Brock England, Garrett Graham, and Cyndi Williams. The film premiered at the South By Southwest film festival in 2013 and later screened at multiple North American Film Festivals including the Maryland Film Festival, the Fantasia International Film Festival in Montreal and the Newport Beach Film Festival.

== Plot ==
Scott Weidemeyer (Sam Eidson) is an overweight, surly delivery driver. He has a poor relationship with his family, including his grandmother, Wanda (Anne Gee Byrd), with whom he lives. Once a week, he hosts a table top game which he rules with an iron fist. One evening, a player abruptly quits the game permanently to work on his marriage. Scott tries to replace him, but his foul temper makes him untouchable to anyone who knows him. While out delivering food to the local game shop he previously worked for, he meets a charismatic hipster named Miles (Garrett Graham). Scott offers him a place in his game and Miles accepts.

Miles’s friendly and accepting attitude helps him fit in with Scott’s friends, including Wayne (Brock England), Scott’s best friend. But Scott is defensive and touchy around Miles because of all of Miles’s success in life, including his attractive girlfriend and running a successful popular culture website.

Hours after the game, Wanda has a stroke. His mother Barbara (Cyndi Williams), comes to visit, bringing her 3rd fiancé, Bob (Larry Jack Dotson). Scott is antagonistic towards Barbara, resenting her for leaving him with his grandmother as a boy to go live in a commune. The following week, Scott tries to run a smooth game night but Barbara interrupts, humiliates Scott in front of the group and forces them to end early.

The players decide to host the next game night at Miles's house, which frustrates Scott. Before the game, Scott attempts to impress the group by declaring that The Matrix was written by him in junior high. When Miles begins to poke holes in his claim, Scott begins to yell at Miles and goes to the bathroom to cry. During the game, Miles decides to venture off the story Scott has planned and to kill off an important story non-player character. Scott attempts to cheat his way out of it but Miles's girlfriend catches him. The players tell Scott the game has become too serious and it's no longer fun when he's the dungeon master. Scott has a meltdown and orders them all to leave, but his friends opt to stay and play with Miles instead, which further enrages Scott.

Back at his grandmother's house, Scott finds out his mother wants to sell Wanda's house to settle debt she has accumulated. Barbara manages to convince Wanda to sell the house after offering her a comfortable retirement near Barbara's house in Arizona. An angry Scott, who was promised the house by Wanda, berates his grandmother until she hits him for his disrespect.

Scott returns to the local gaming shop where his hero, Greg Goran (Dakin Matthews), is making an appearance. Scott humbly asks the assistant manager, Pete (John Gholson) for his old job back. During a Q&A, Scott asks a question seeking validation of his attitude and Goran tells Scott that the GM (game master) is responsible for insuring that the players have fun above all else. Scott becomes enraged, cusses out Goran, insults Pete and denigrates the store. Pete then tells the audience that Scott was fired for masturbating to hentai anime pornography in the backroom while the store was being robbed. An angry and humiliated Scott storms out.

Scott blames Miles for everything wrong with his life now. He drives to Miles’s house to confront him and finds Miles is hosting a party. Scott begins drinking and talking with several of Miles's friends. After seeing Scott in his home, Miles calls Wayne and asks him to come get Scott. An intoxicated Scott publicly challenges Miles to a faux battle using crutches as swords. A reluctant Miles agrees, urged on by the party-goers who are amused by Scott’s ridiculous fantasy antics. Scott loses control, lashes out and hits Miles hard in the face. Miles retaliates by striking him in the stomach which puts him on the floor. Wayne, hurt for not being invited to the party and seeing his friend beaten, decides to attack Miles. Miles throws him back and angrily sends them both away. As Wayne drives Scott home, Scott admits he belittled him because he “needed someone to be a bigger loser than me.”

A few months later, Scott is employed at the Arizona retirement home where his grandmother lives. He himself lives with Bob and Barbara, whose marriage is rapidly deteriorating. Happier and more responsible, he plays his game with a small group of seniors. In the final scene, Scott shows a sliver of improvement in his attitude while still clinging to his serious, competitive nature.

== Cast ==
- Sam Eidson as Scott
- Anne Gee Byrd as Wanda
- Brock England as Wayne
- Garrett Graham as Miles
- Cyndi Williams as Barbara
- Vincent Prendergast as Martin
- Dakin Matthews as Greg Goran (fictionalized version of Gary Gygax)
- Katie Folger as Kendra
- Lowell Bartholomee as Ulrich
- Duncan Carson as Nathan
- Larry Jack Dotson as Bob
- Jeff Fenter as Kenny
- Ashley Spillers as Sarah
- Micheal Foulk as Kevin
- John Gholson as Pete Bowles
- Jennymarie Jemison as Checker
- Jason Crawford Jordan as Ben
- Nguyen Stanton as Mrs. Yi
- Brian Losoya as Leonard

== Reception ==
Zero Charisma received generally positive reviews. On the review aggregator website Rotten Tomatoes, 77% of 26 critics' reviews are positive, with an average rating of 6.7/10. The website's consensus reads: "Zero Charisma takes a refreshingly empathetic -- and often quite funny -- look at characters historically marginalized as one-dimensional archetypes." Metacritic, which uses a weighted average, assigned the film a score of 63 out of 100, based on 11 critics, indicating "generally favorable" reviews.

A.A. Dowd of The A.V. Club gave the film a B grade, citing the film as one with "perverse pleasures" in its character study of a distinctly unlikable outcast.
