= Pod Meets World =

Podcast

- Genre: Rewatch podcast

Cast and voices
- Hosted by: Rider Strong; Danielle Fishel; Will Friedle

Publication
- No. of episodes: 466
- Original release: June 29, 2022
- Provider: iHeartPodcasts

Pod Meets World is a rewatch podcast hosted by Rider Strong, Danielle Fishel, and Will Friedle. The hosts rewatch episodes of their 1990s sitcom Boy Meets World and later the 2010s sitcom Girl Meets World. sharing behind-the-scenes memories, and interviewing other actors and producers who were involved with the two shows.

The podcast premiered on June 26, 2022. It is produced by iHeartPodcasts.

== Production ==
According to Danielle Fishel, Rider Strong first had the idea for the podcast in 2018. Though Ben Savage was initially in discussions to co-host the podcast, he ultimately decided not to. Fishel said in 2022, "And so we talked about all the different ways we could do it. And at the end of our conversations, Ben said, 'I just don't think it's for me.' And we get it. So we're respecting his decision. And if he eventually wants to come on, we'll leave that door open."

Episodes of the podcast are either interviews or discussions of an episode of the series. According to Rider Strong, he had not seen many episodes of the series since they first aired in the 1990s. For the podcast, Strong is rewatching the episodes with his son, and the podcast sometimes features recordings of Strong's son's reaction to the episodes.

== Reception ==
The podcast has received mostly positive reviews. Avery Thompson of Hollywood Life called it "the podcast we didn't know we needed."

== Controversy ==
The podcast encountered controversy in February 2024 on their episode discussing guest star and crew member Brian Peck, a convicted sex offender. As revealed in the docuseries Quiet on Set: The Dark Side of Kids TV, Friedle and Strong were amongst the public figures who wrote letters of support for probation during Peck’s 2004 trial regarding allegations of child sexual abuse three years earlier in 2001. Although both have stated regret for their support at the time, many criticized them for not giving a direct apology to the victim, who was later revealed to be former child star and teen idol Drake Bell. After Bell called out Friedle and Strong multiple times, he eventually forgave Strong after speaking with him, tweeting about it on April 5.

The February 23, 2025 episode featured Maitland Ward, who had appeared as Rachel McGuire in Boy Meets World but had not appeared in the follow-up Girl Meets World (one of the few alumni of the earlier show not to reprise her role). The episode was contentious, with Ward and Fishel discussing, often heatedly, the strained relations between Ward and the rest of the cast (especially Fishel), which were mostly unrelated to Ward's later work in adult entertainment. Ward later stated that she suspected the episode was an ambush conceived to draw listeners; she was disappointed she was not warned ahead of time, noting that she and Friedle were still good friends more than she was with the others.

== Episodes ==
No.	Title	Original release date
1	"TGI-Happening"	June 26, 2022
The podcast premiere. Co-hosts Rider Strong, Danielle Fishel, and Will Friedle share their reasons for starting the podcast.
2	"TGI-The Pilot"	June 29, 2022
A discussion of the pilot.
3	"William "Rusty" Russ Meets World"	July 3, 2022
An interview with actor William Russ who starred as Alan Matthews.
4	"TGI-Dad Episode 102 "On the Fence""	July 6, 2022
A discussion of season 1, episode 2 "On the Fence" with William "Rusty" Russ.
5	"William Daniels Meets World"	July 10, 2022
An interview with actor William Daniels who starred as Mr. Feeny and his wife Bonnie Bartlett who starred as Dean Bolander.
6	"TGI-Episode 103 "Father Knows Less""	July 13, 2022
A discussion of season 1, episode 3 "Father Knows Less."
7	"David Trainer Meets World"	July 17, 2022
An interview with David Trainer, who directed 44 episodes of Boy Meets World. Trainer discusses the uncomfortable working conditions that show creator Michael Jacobs created for the young actors. Danielle Fishel discusses how Jacobs embarrassed her in front of the cast and crew, calling it a "toxic work environment."
8	"TGI-Episode 104 "Cory's Alternative Friends""	July 20, 2022
A discussion of season 1, episode 4 "Cory's Alternative Friends" with David Trainer.
9	"Lee Norris Meets World"	July 24, 2022
An interview with actor Lee Norris who played Stuart Minkus during the first season.
10	"TGI-Episode 105 "Killer Bees""	July 27, 2022
A discussion of season 1, episode 5 "Killer Bees."
11	"Marty York Meets World"	July 31, 2022
An interview with actor Marty York who appeared as Larry in three episodes of the first season.
12	"TGI-Episode 106 "Boys II Mensa""	August 3, 2022
A discussion of season 1, episode 6 "Boys II Mensa."
13	"Lauren Lapkus Meets World TGI-Episode 107 "Grandma Was a Rolling Stone""	August 7, 2022
An interview with comedian and Boy Meets World fan Lauren Lapkus and discussion of season 1, episode 7 "Grandma was a Rolling Stone".
14	"Lauren Lapkus Meets World Part 2 TGI-Episode 107 "Grandma Was a Rolling Stone""	August 10, 2022
A continuation of the interview with comedian and Boy Meets World fan Lauren Lapkus and discussion of season 1, episode 7 "Grandma was a Rolling Stone."
15	"TGI-Episode 108 "Teacher's Bet""	August 14, 2022
A discussion of season 1, episode 8 "Teacher's Bet."
16	"Q&A Meets World Part 1"	August 21, 2022
Rider, Danielle, and Will answer listener questions.
17	"Q&A Meets World Part 2"	August 24, 2022
Rider, Danielle, and Will continue answering listener questions.
18	"Lance Bass Meets World"	August 28, 2022
An interview with singer Lance Bass who dated Danielle.
19	"TGI-Episode 109 "Class Pre-Union""	August 31, 2022
A discussion of season 1, episode 9 "Class Pre-Union."
20	"Betsy Randle Meets World"	September 4, 2022
An interview with actress Betsy Randle who played Amy Matthews.
21	"TGI-Episode 110 "Santa's Little Helper""	September 7, 2022
A discussion of season 1, episode 10 "Santa's Little Helper".
22	"Trina McGee Meets World"	September 11, 2022
An interview with Trina McGee who played Angela Moore on three seasons.
23	"TGI-Episode 111 "The Father/Son Game""	September 14, 2022
A discussion of season 1, episode 11 "The Father/Son Game" with Trina McGee.
24	"Barbie Block and Sally Stiner Meet World"	September 18, 2022
An interview with Barbie Block and Sally Stiner, who were the casting directors for the show.
25	"TGI-Episode 112 "Once in Love With Amy""	September 21, 2022
Critic/writer Starlee Kine joins the hosts to discuss the concept of comfort TV and season 1, episode 12 "Once in Love with Amy".
26	"Marla Sokoloff Meets World"	September 25, 2022
Interview with actress Marla Sokoloff, who made her television debut in the season 1 episode "Cory's Alternative Friends".
27	"TGI-Episode 113 "She Loves Me, She Loves Me Not""	September 28, 2022
A discussion of season 1, episode 13 "She Loves Me, She Loves Me Not."
28	"Christine Lakin Meets World"	October 2, 2022
An interview with Step by Step actress Christine Lakin.
29	"TGI-Episode 114 "The B-Team for Life""	October 5, 2022
A discussion of season 1 episode 14, "The B-Team for Life."
30	"TGI-Episode 115 "Model Family""	October 9, 2022
A discussion of season 1 episode 15, "Model Family."
31	"Kris Kyer Meets World"	October 16, 2022
An interview with Kristopher Kyer, who was the dialogue coach of the first season and provided offscreen voices in three episodes.
32	"TGI- The BMW DNA"	October 19, 2022
Danielle, Will, and Rider go over their 23andMe results and interview several background actors from Boy Meets World.
33	"TGI-Episode 116 "Risky Business""	October 23, 2022
A discussion of season 1, episode 16 "Risky Business."
34	"Q&A Meets World pt3: The Sequel's Sequel"	October 26, 2022
Rider, Danielle, and Will answer even further questions from listeners.
35	"DeJuan Guy Meets World"	October 30, 2022
An interview with "Death Chair" alum DeJuan Guy, who played Ellis in two episodes.
36	"TGI-Episode 117 "The Fugitive""	November 3, 2022
A discussion of season 1, episode 17 "The Fugitive."
37	"Jeff Sherman Meets World"	November 6, 2022
An interview with Jeff Sherman, a writer and producer on the show. Sherman wrote the Shawn-centric episode "The Fugitive", among others.
38	"TGI-Episode 118 "It's a Wonderful Night""	November 9, 2022
A discussion of season 1, episode 18 "It's a Wonderful Night."
39	"Matthew Lawrence Meets World"	November 13, 2022
An interview with Matthew Lawrence, who played Jack Hunter in seasons 5, 6, and 7.
40	"TGI-Episode 119 "Kid Gloves""	November 16, 2022
A discussion of season 1, episode 19 "Kid Gloves."
41	"TGI-Episode 120 "The Play's the Thing""	November 20, 2022
A discussion of season 1, episode 20 "The Play's the Thing."
42	"Jeff Menell Meets World"	November 27, 2022
An interview with writer Jeff Menell who wrote the fan-favorite episode "And Then There Was Shawn" among others.
43	"TGI-Episode 121 "Boy Meets Girl""	November 30, 2022
A discussion of season 1, episode 21 "Boy Meets Girl".
44	"Jason Marsden Meets World"	December 4, 2022
An interview with Jason Marsden who played Jason Marsden in nine episodes of seasons 1 and 2.
45	"TGI-Episode 122 "I Dream of Feeny""	December 7, 2022
A discussion of the season 1, episode 22 "I Dream of Feeny."
46	"A Surprise Meets World"	December 11, 2022
Will and Rider believe they're doing Boy Meets World Trivia but Danielle has a surprise for them both.
47	"Kathy Ireland Meets World"	December 14, 2022
An interview with Kathy Ireland who appeared as Alexis in season 1, episode 15 "Model Family."
48	"Lindsay Price Meets World"	December 18, 2022
An interview with Lindsay Price who appeared as Linda in season 1, episode 8 "Teacher's Bet."
49	"Bruh Meets World...Meets World (Season 1 Recap)"	December 25, 2022
Danielle, Will, and Rider sit down with the hosts of fan podcast "Bruh Meets World" to recap Season 1.
50	"TGI-Episode 201 "Back 2 School""	January 4, 2023
A discussion of season 2, episode 1 "Back 2 School."
51	"Anthony Tyler Quinn Meets World"	January 8, 2023
An interview with Anthony Tyler Quinn who played Jonathan Turner in three seasons.
52	"TGI-Episode 202 "Pairing Off""	January 11, 2023
A discussion of season 2, episode 2 "Pairing Off".
53	"Janette Kotichas Meets World"	January 15, 2023
An interview with season 1 staff-writer Janette Kotichas who wrote the episodes "Boyz II Mensa" and "Boy Meets Girl".
54	"TGI-Episode 203 "Notorious""	January 18, 2023
A discussion of season 2, episode 3 "Notorious".
55	"Adam Scott Meets World"	January 22, 2023
An interview with Adam Scott who appeared in four episodes as two different characters.
56	"TGI-Episode 204 "Me and Mr. Joad""	January 25, 2023
A discussion of season 2, episode 4 "Mr and Mr. Joad".
57	"Marguerite Moreau Meets World"	January 29, 2023
An interview with actress Marguerite Moreau who played Rebecca in the season 2 episode "Pairing Off".
58	"TGI-Episode 205 "The Uninvited""	February 1, 2023
A discussion of season 2, episode 5 "The Uninvited".
59	"Blake Sennett Meets World"	February 5, 2023
An interview with Blake Sennett (originally credited as Blake Soper) who played Joey "The Rat" Epstein in three seasons.
60	"TGI-Episode 206 "Who's Afraid of Cory Wolf?""	February 8, 2023
A discussion of season 2, episode 6 "Who's Afraid of Cory Wolf?".
61	"Ethan Suplee Meets World"	February 12, 2023
An interview with Ethan Suplee who played Frankie "The Enforcer" Stechino, Jr. in four seasons.
62	"TGI-Episode 207 "Wake Up Little Cory""	February 15, 2023
A discussion of season 2, episode 7 "Wake Up Little Cory".
63	"Danny McNulty Meets World"	February 19, 2023
An interview with Danny McNulty who played Harley Keiner in a total of eight episodes.
64	"TGI-Episode 208 "Band on the Run""	February 22, 2023
A discussion of season 2, episode 8 "Band on the Run".
65	"Mark Blutman Meets World"	February 26, 2023
An interview with "Boy Meets World" writer and producer Mark Blutman.
66	"TGI-Episode 209 "Fear Strikes Out""	March 1, 2023
A discussion of season 2, episode 9 "Fear Strikes Out".
67	"Didi DeStefano Meets World"	March 5, 2023
An interview with Boy Meets World stage manager Didi DeStefano.
68	"TGI-Episode 210 "Sister Theresa""	March 8, 2023
A discussion of season 2, episode 10 "Sister Theresa".
69	"TGI-Episode 211 "The Beard""	March 15, 2023
A discussion of season 2, episode 11 "The Beard".
70	"Blake Clark Meets World"	March 19, 2023
An interview with Blake Clark who played Chet Hunter in a total of 12 episodes.
71	"TGI-Episode 212 "Turnaround""	March 22, 2023
A discussion of season 2, episode 12 "Turnaround".
72	"Q&A Meets World! Part 1"	March 27, 2023
The first part of a two part episode in which Rider, Danielle, and Will answer fan questions.
73	"Q&A Meets World! Part 2"	March 28, 2023
The second part of a two part episode in which Rider, Danielle, and Will answer fan questions.
74	"TGI - Episode 213 “Cyrano”"	March 30, 2023
A discussion of season 2, episode 13 "Cyrano".
75	"David Kendall Meets World"	April 3, 2023
An interview with writer, producer, and director of Boy Meets World, David Kendall.
76	"TGI - Episode 214 “I Am Not a Crook”"	April 6, 2023
Rider, Danielle, and Will discuss their feelings on former co-star Ben Savage running for Congress, and season 2, episode 14 "I Am Not A Crook".
77	"Young Danielle, Rider & Will Meet World"	April 10, 2023
Rider, Danielle, and Will react to old interview clips of themselves just as they began their work on Boy Meets World.
78	"TGI - Episode 215 "Breaking Up is Really, Really Hard to Do""	April 12, 2023
A discussion of season 2, episode 15 "Breaking Up is Really, Really Hard to Do".
79	"TGI - Episode 216 "Danger Boy" w/Tony Quinn (Part 1)"	April 16, 2023
A discussion of season 2, episode 16 "Danger Boy".
80	"TGI - Episode 216 "Danger Boy" w/Tony Quinn (Part 2)"	April 19, 2023
A continuation of the discussion from Part 1.
81	"Group Therapy Meets World"	April 23, 2023
Therapist Kiera Muscara helps Rider, Danielle, and Will look back on their childhood experiences.
82	"TGI - Episode 217 "On The Air""	April 26, 2023
A discussion of season 2, episode 17 "On The Air".
83	"Danielle Harris Meets World"	April 30, 2023
An interview with actress Danielle Harris, who played Theresa Keiner in season 2, episode 10 "Sister Theresa".
84	"TGI - Episode 218 "By Hook or by Crook""	May 3, 2023
A discussion of season 2, episode 18 "By Hook or by Crook".
85	"Jodie Sweetin Meets World"	May 7, 2023
An interview with actress Jodie Sweetin.
86	"TGI - Episode 219 "Wrong Side of the Tracks""	May 10, 2023
A discussion of season 2, episode 19 "Wrong Side of the Tracks".
87	"Nancy Kerrigan Meets World"	May 14, 2023
An interview with professional skater Nancy Kerrigan, who appeared as a fictionalized version of herself in season 2, episode 19 "Wrong Side of the Tracks".
88	"TGI - Episode 220 "Pop Quiz""	May 17, 2023
A discussion of season 2, episode 20 "Pop Quiz".
89	"Pod Meets World LIVE! Presented by Hyundai"	May 22, 2023
An audio version of a PMW live show from the iHeart Theater in Los Angeles, California.
90	"TGI - Episode 221 "The Thrilla' in Phila""	May 24, 2023
A discussion of season 2, episode 21 "The Thrilla' in Phila".
91	"Natanya Ross Meets World"	May 28, 2023
An interview with actress Natanya Ross, who played Ingrid Iverson in season 2, episode 12 "Turnaround".
92	"TGI - Episode 222 "Career Day""	May 31, 2023
A discussion of season 2, episode 22 "Career Day".
93	"Kenny Johnston Meets World"	June 4, 2023
An interview with actor Kenny Johnston, who temporarily replaced Danny McNulty as Harley Keiner in season 2, episode 19 "Wrong Side of the Tracks".
94	"TGI - Episode 223 "Home""	June 7, 2023
A discussion of season 2, episode 23 "Home".
95	"The Stalker Family Meets World"	June 11, 2023
An interview with members of the Shere family, who attended almost every taping of Boy Meets World.
96	"Bruh Meets World...Meets World (Season 2 Recap)"	June 14, 2023
Rider, Danielle, and Will sit down with the hosts of fan podcast "Bruh Meets World" to recap season 2.
97	"Andrea Barber Meets World"	June 18, 2023
An interview with actress Andrea Barber.
98	"'Summertime Switch' Meets World"	June 21, 2023
Rider, Danielle, and Will discuss the 1994 TV movie Summertime Switch, in which Strong starred.
99	"Bonnie Morgan Meets World"	June 25, 2023
An interview with actress Bonnie Morgan, who originally portrayed Topanga before Danielle replaced her.
100	"'Munchie Strikes Back' Meets World (with Natanya Ross)"	June 28, 2023
A discussion of the film Munchie Strikes Back, in which Ross played the role of Jennifer.
101	"Darlene Vogel Meets World"	July 9, 2023
An interview with actress Darlene Vogel, who played Katherine "Kat" Tompkins in season 2.
102	"TGI-Episode #301 "My Best Friend's Girl""	July 12, 2023
A discussion of season 3, episode 1 "My Best Friend's Girl".
103	"Jason Weaver Meets World"	July 16, 2023
An interview with Smart Guy actor Jason Weaver.
104	"TGI-Episode 302 "The Double Lie""	July 19, 2023
A discussion of season 3, episode 2 "The Double Lie".
105	"Jeff McCracken Meets World"	July 23, 2023
An interview with Jeff McCracken, who directed over 50 episodes of Boy Meets World.
106	"How Rude, Tanneritos (Jodie Sweetin & Andrea Barber) Meets World"	July 25, 2023
An interview with Jodie Sweetin and Andrea Barber, who are promoting their own podcast, "How Rude, Tanneritos", where they look back on their show Full House.
107	"TGI-Episode 303 "What I Meant to Say""	July 27, 2023
A discussion of season 3, episode 3 "What I Meant to Say".
108	"Alex Désert Meets World"	July 31, 2023
An interview with actor Alex Désert, who played Eli Williams in season 3 of Boy Meets World.
109	"TGI-Episode 304 "He Said, She Said""	August 3, 2023
A discussion of season 3, episode 4 "He Said, She Said".
110	"Lindsay Ridgeway Meets World"	August 7, 2023
An interview with actress Lindsay Ridgeway, who was the second to portray Morgan Matthews on Boy Meets World.
111	"TGI-Episode 305 "Hometown Hero""	August 10, 2023
A discussion of season 3, episode 5 "Hometown Hero".
112	"Sara Markowitz Meets World"	August 14, 2023
An interview with Sara Markowitz, who designed costumes for seasons 2 and 3 of Boy Meets World.
113	"TGI-Episode 306 "This Little Piggy""	August 17, 2023
A discussion of season 3, episode 6 "This Little Piggy".
114	"Melissa Joan Hart Meets World"	August 21, 2023
An interview with actress Melissa Joan Hart.
115	"TGI-Episode 307 "Truth and Consequences""	August 24, 2023
A discussion of season 3, episode 7 "Truth and Consequences".
116	"Jennifer Fishel Meets World"	August 28, 2023
An interview with Danielle's mother Jennifer.
117	"TGI-Episode 308 "Rave On""	August 31, 2023
A discussion of season 3, episode 8 "Rave On".
118	"Mark-Paul Gosselaar Meets World"	September 4, 2023
An interview with actor Mark-Paul Gosselaar.
119	"TGI – Episode 309 "The Last Temptation of Cory""	September 7, 2023
A discussion of season 3, episode 9 "The Last Temptation of Cory".
120	"Tamara Johnson Meets World"	September 11, 2023
An interview with Tamara Johnson, who was the sound mixer for Boy Meets World and Girl Meets World.
121	"TGI – Episode 310 "Train of Fools""	September 13, 2023
A discussion of season 3, episode 10 "Train of Fools".
122	"Susan Estelle Jansen Meets World"	September 17, 2023
An interview with Susan Estelle Jansen who was a writer/producer for seasons 1–4 of Boy Meets World and co-wrote the Girl Meets World episode "Girl Meets First Date".
123	"TGI – Episode 311 "City Slickers""	September 21, 2023
A discussion of season 3, episode 11 "City Slickers".
124	"The Pod Meets World Half-Draft: Characters"	September 24, 2023
Rider, Danielle and Will "draft" the best possible teams of Boy Meets World characters.
125	"A Pod Meets World Road Trip to Vegas"	September 28, 2023
Rider, Danielle and Will hold a Q&A session while taking a road trip to Las Vegas.
126	"The Pod Meets World Half-Draft: Episodes"	October 1, 2023
Rider, Danielle and Will hold a "draft" for the best Boy Meets World episodes they've seen so far.
127	"TGI – Episode 312 "The Grass is Always Greener""	October 5, 2023
A discussion of season 3, episode 12 "The Grass is Always Greener".
128	"Steve Hoefer Meets World"	October 8, 2023
An interview with Boy Meets World stage manager Steve Hoefer.
129	"TGI – Episode 313 "New Friends and Old""	October 11, 2023
A discussion of season 3, episode 13 "New Friends and Old".
130	"Wesley Staples Meets World"	October 15, 2023
An interview with Boy Meets World on-set teacher Wesley Staples.
131	"TGI – Episode 314 "A Kiss is More Than a Kiss""	October 19, 2023
A discussion of season 3, episode 14 "A Kiss is More Than a Kiss".
132	"King & Lin Strong Meet World"	October 22, 2023
An interview with Rider's parents King and Lin.
133	"TGI – Episode 315 "The Heart is a Lonely Hunter""	October 25, 2023
A discussion of season 3, episode 15 "The Heart is a Lonely Hunter".
134	"The Pod Meets World Half Draft: '90s Movies"	October 30, 2023
Rider, Danielle and Will hold a "draft" for the best movie released in the 1990s.
135	"TGI – Episode 316 "Stormy Weather""	November 1, 2023
A discussion of season 3, episode 16 "Stormy Weather".
136	"Attorney Gary Friedle Meets World"	November 5, 2023
An interview with Will's father Gary.
137	"TGI – Episode 317 "The Pink Flamingo Kid""	November 9, 2023
A discussion of season 3, episode 17 "The Pink Flamingo Kid".
138	"Adam Duritz Meets World"	November 12, 2023
An interview with Counting Crows lead singer Adam Duritz.
139	"TGI – Episode 318 "Life Lessons""	November 15, 2023
A discussion of season 3, episode 18 "Life Lessons".
140	"Pod Meets Sailing with the Stars"	November 19, 2023
A discussion of Rider and Danielle's experiences on a celebrity-themed sea cruise.
141	"TGI – Episode 319 "I Was a Teenage Spy""	November 22, 2023
A discussion of season 3, episode 19 "I Was a Teenage Spy".
142	"Laurie Heaps Meets World"	November 27, 2023
An interview with Laurie Heaps, who, starting with season 3, was a hairstylist for Boy Meets World.
143	"TGI – Episode 320 "I Never Sang for My Legal Guardian""	November 29, 2023
A discussion of season 3, episode 20 "I Never Sang for My Legal Guardian".
144	"TGI – Episode 321 "The Happiest Show on Earth (Part 1)"	December 6, 2023
A discussion of season 3, episode 21 "The Happiest Show on Earth".
145	"TGI – Episode 321 "The Greatest Show on Earth" (Part 2)"	December 7, 2023
A continuation of the discussion from Part 1.
146	"TGI – Episode 322 "Brother, Brother""	December 13, 2023
A discussion of season 3, episode 22 "Brother, Brother".
147	"Bruh Meets World...Meets World (Season 3 Recap)"	December 20, 2023
Rider, Danielle and Will sit down with the hosts of fan podcast "Bruh Meets World" to recap season 3.
148	"Group Therapy Meets World Part 2"	December 27, 2023
Therapist Kiera Muscara returns to help Rider, Danielle and Will reflect on their Boy Meets World experiences and evaluate how their podcast has affected their current outlook on life.
149	"TGI – Episode 401 "You Can Go Home Again""	January 3, 2024
A discussion of season 4, episode 1 "You Can Go Home Again".
150	"Patrick Renna Meets World"	January 7, 2024
An interview with actor Patrick Renna, who played Kyle in season 3, episode 18 "Life Lessons", and also appeared in the TV movie Summertime Switch.
151	"TGI – Episode 402 "Hair Today, Goon Tomorrow""	January 10, 2024
A discussion of season 4, episode 2 "Hair Today, Goon Tomorrow".
152	"Kevin Kelton Meets World"	January 14, 2024
An interview with Kevin Kelton, who was a producer for Boy Meets World and is credited with writing four episodes.
153	"TGI – Episode 403 "I Ain't Gonna Spray Lettuce No More""	January 17, 2024
A discussion of season 4, episode 3 "I Ain't Gonna Spray Lettuce No More".
154	"Staci Keanan Meets World (and a BIG ANNOUNCEMENT!)"	January 21, 2024
First, Will and The Cheetah Girls star Sabrina Bryan announce their new podcast, Magical Rewind, where they discuss Wonderful World of Disney and Disney Channel Original Movies. Then, an interview with Step by Step actress Staci Keanan.
155	"TGI – Episode 404 "Fishing for Virna""	January 25, 2024
A discussion of season 4, episode 4 "Fishing for Virna".
156	"Larisa Oleynik Meets World"	January 28, 2024
An interview with actress Larisa Oleynik, who played Dana Pruitt on 3 episodes of Boy Meets World.
157	"TGI – Episode 405 "Shallow Boy""	January 31, 2024
A discussion of season 4, episode 5 "Shallow Boy".
158	"Wesley Jonathan Meets World"	February 4, 2024
An interview with actor Wesley Jonathan, who played T.J. in season 3, episode 10, "Train of Fools".
159	"TGI – Episode 406 "Janitor Dad""	February 7, 2024
A discussion of season 4, episode 6 "Janitor Dad".
160	"Andrew Keegan Meets World"	February 11, 2024
An interview with actor Andrew Keegan, who played Ronnie "Lips" Waterman in season 3, episode 21 "The Happiest Show on Earth".
161	"TGI – Episode 407 "Singled Out""	February 14, 2024
A discussion of season 4, episode 7 "Singled Out".
162	"Pod Meets World 2/19/24"	February 19, 2024
Rider, Danielle, Will and marriage and family therapist Kati Morton discuss sexual grooming and child sexual abuse, in light of the 2003 arrest and eventual conviction of actor Brian Peck, who was a stand-in for at least the fifth season of Boy Meets World, and whom Rider and Will once considered a personal friend.
163	"TGI – Episode 408 "Dangerous Secret""	February 21, 2024
A discussion of season 4, episode 8 "Dangerous Secret".
164	"Dom Irrera Meets World"	February 25, 2024
An interview with actor and stand-up comedian Dom Irrera, who played Bosco Cellini in season 4, episode 2 "Hair Today, Goon Tomorrow".
165	"TGI – Episode 409 "Sixteen Candles and Four-Hundred-Pound Men""	February 28, 2024
A discussion of season 4, episode 9 "Sixteen Candles and Four-Hundred-Pound Men".
166	"Elisabeth Harnois Meets World"	March 3, 2024
An interview with actress Elisabeth Harnois, who played Missy Robinson in season 3, episode 9 "The Last Temptation of Cory" and co-starred with Will in the TV movie My Date with the President's Daughter.
167	"TGI – Episode 410 "Turkey Day""	March 6, 2024
A discussion of season 4, episode 10 "Turkey Day".
168	"Leisha Hailey Meets World"	March 10, 2024
An interview with actress and musician Leisha Hailey, who played Corrina Collins in season 4, episode 5, "Shallow Boy". Note: Rider Strong is absent for this episode.
169	"TGI – Episode 411 "An Affair to Forget""	March 14, 2024
A discussion of season 4, episode 11 "An Affair to Forget".
170	"Hillary Tuck Meets World"	March 18, 2024
An interview with actress Hillary Tuck, who appeared on Boy Meets World as three different characters.
171	"TGI – Episode 412 "Easy Street""	March 20, 2024
A discussion of season 4, episode 12 "Easy Street".
172	"Shareen Mitchell Meets World"	March 24, 2024
An interview with actress Shareen Mitchell, who played Virna Hunter on season 4 of Boy Meets World.
173	"TGI – Episode 413 "B&B's B ‘N’ B"	March 27, 2024
A discussion of season 4, episode 13 "B&B's B ‘N’ B".
174	"Amy Jo Johnson Meets World"	March 31, 2024
An interview with actress Amy Jo Johnson.
175	"TGI – Episode 414 "Wheels""	April 3, 2024
A discussion of season 4, episode 14 "Wheels".
176	"Jacqui Fehl Meets World"	April 7, 2024
An interview with actress Jacqui Fehl, who played a waitress in the background of season 4, episode 5 "Shallow Boy".
177	"TGI – Episode 415 "Chick Like Me""	April 10, 2024
A discussion of season 4, episode 15 "Chick Like Me".
178	"Kristanna Loken Meets World"	April 15, 2024
An interview with actress Kristanna Loken, who played Jennifer Bassett on two episodes of Boy Meets World and one episode of Girl Meets World.
179	"TGI – Episode 416 "A Long Walk to Pittsburgh: Part 1""	April 17, 2024
A discussion of season 4, episode 16 "A Long Walk to Pittsburgh: Part 1".
180	"Jenna Von Oy Meets World"	April 22, 2024
An interview with actress Jenna Von Oy.
181	"TGI – Episode 417 "A Long Walk to Pittsburgh: Part 2""	April 24, 2024
A discussion of season 4, episode 17 "A Long Walk to Pittsburgh: Part 2".
182	"Jeff Sherman Meets World (again)"	April 29, 2024
Another interview with Boy Meets World writer/producer Jeff Sherman.
183	"TGI – Episode 418 "Uncle Daddy""	May 1, 2024
A discussion of season 4, episode 18 "Uncle Daddy".
184	"Justin Cooper Meets World"	May 6, 2024
An interview with actor Justin Cooper, who played Ryan in season 4, episode 18 "Uncle Daddy".
185	"Sleepover at The Matthews House w/ William Russ and Betsy Randle"	May 9, 2024
Rider, Danielle, Will, William Russ and Betsy Randle have a "sleepover" at the house that was used as the exterior of the Matthews' house on season four of Boy Meets World.
186	"SLEEPOVER WEEK: Boxarate with Andrew Keegan"	May 12, 2024
Rider, Danielle, Will and Andrew Keegan discuss Keegan's workout tape Boxarate.
187	"SLEEPOVER WEEK: Magic: The Gathering"	May 13, 2024
Rider, Danielle and Will play a Pod Meets World-themed version of Magic: The Gathering.
188	"SLEEPOVER WEEK: In the Tent"	May 15, 2024
Rider, Danielle and Will spend the night in the backyard sharing stories of sleepovers from their youth.
189	"SLEEPOVER WEEK: Breakfast"	May 16, 2024
Rider, Danielle and Will have breakfast and discuss their favorite parts of the sleepover.
190	"Bruce Prichard Meets World"	May 19, 2024
An interview with Bruce Prichard, who appeared as his alter ego Brother Love in season 4, episode 19 "Sixteen Candles and Four-Hundred-Pound Men" and even produced the in-ring portion of the episode.
191	"TGI – Episode 419 "Quiz Show""	May 22, 2024
A discussion of season 4, episode 19 "Quiz Show".
192	"Lindsey McKeon Meets World"	May 26, 2024
An interview with actress Lindsey McKeon, who played Libby Harper in two episodes of Boy Meets World.
193	"TGI – Episode 420 "Security Guy""	May 29, 2024
A discussion of season 4, episode 20 "Security Guy".
194	"Lisa Loeb Meets World"	June 3, 2024
An interview with music artist Lisa Loeb.
195	"TGI – Episode 421 "Cult Fiction" Part 1"	June 5, 2024
A discussion of season 4, episode 21 "Cult Fiction".
196	"TGI – Episode 421 "Cult Fiction" Part 2"	June 7, 2024
A continuation of the discussion from Part 1.
197	"Shiloh Strong Meets World"	June 9, 2024
An interview with Rider's brother Shiloh.
198	"TGI – Episode 422 "Learning to Fly""	June 13, 2024
A discussion of season 4, episode 22 "Learning to Fly".
199	"Jeff McCracken Meets World Again"	June 16, 2024
Another interview with Jeff McCracken.
200	"Bruh Meets World... Meets World (Season 4 Recap)"	June 20, 2024
Rider, Danielle and Will sit down with the hosts of fan podcast "Bruh Meets World" to recap season 4.
201	"Debbe Dunning Meets World"	June 23, 2024
An interview with actress Debbe Dunning, who played Alexandra in season 3, episode 21 "The Happiest Show on Earth".
202	"Camp Nowhere Meets World with Hillary Tuck"	June 26, 2024
Rider, Danielle, Will and actress Hillary Tuck discuss the 1994 movie Camp Nowhere, in which Tuck played the role of Betty Stoller.
203	"BONUS-Live from The Kids Wanna Jump! Tour"	June 28, 2024
Rider, Danielle and Will talk about fun stories and moments from their live shows.
204	"Tamara Mello Meets World"	July 7, 2024
An interview with actress Tamara Mello, who played Sherri in season 4, episode 21 "Cult Fiction".
205	"TGI – Episode 501 "Brothers""	July 10, 2024
A discussion of season 5, episode 1 "Brothers".
206	"Judy Savage Meets World"	July 14, 2024
An interview with talent agent Judy Savage, whose clients included Danielle and Rider.
207	"TGI – Episode 502 "Boy Meets Real World""	July 17, 2024
A discussion of season 5, episode 2 "Boy Meets Real World".
208	"Jonathan C. Kaplan Meets World"	July 21, 2024
An interview with actor Jonathan C. Kaplan, who appeared in four episodes of Boy Meets World season 2.
209	"TGI – Episode 503 "It's Not You... It's Me""	July 24, 2024
A discussion of season 5, episode 3 "It's Not You... Not Me".
210	"Russell Dague Meets World"	July 28, 2024
An interview with Russell Dague, who was the production coordinator for all seven seasons of Boy Meets World.
211	"TGI – Episode 504 "Fraternity Row""	July 31, 2024
A discussion of season 5, episode 4, "Fraternity Row".
212	"Fans Meet World"	August 4, 2024
A Q&A session with fans.
213	"TGI – Episode 505 "The Witches of Pennbrook""	August 8, 2024
A discussion of season 5, episode 5, "The Witches of Pennbrook".
214	"Candace Cameron Bure Meets World"	August 11, 2024
An interview with actress Candace Cameron Bure, who played Millie on season 5, episode 5, "The Witches of Pennbrook".
215	"TGI – Episode 506 "No Guts, No Cory""	August 14, 2024
A discussion of season 5, episode 6 "No Guts, No Cory".
216	"Maggie Lawson Meets World"	August 18, 2024
An interview with actress Maggie Lawson, who played Debbie in season 5, episode 7 "I Love You, Donna Karan".
217	"TGI – Episode 507 "I Love You, Donna Karan""	August 21, 2024
A discussion of season 5, episode 7 "I Love You, Donna Karan".
218	"Montell Jordan Meets World"	August 25, 2024
An interview with singer Montell Jordan.
219	"TGI – Episode 508 "Chasing Angela" featuring Trina McGee"	August 28, 2024
A discussion of season 5, episode 8 "Chasing Angela".
220	"Kelly Packard Meets World"	September 1, 2024
An interview with actress Kelly Packard, who appeared on Boy Meets World as two different characters.
221	"TGI – Episode 509 "How to Succeed in Business""	September 4, 2024
A discussion of season 5, episode 9 "How to Succeed in Business".
222	"Matthew Lawrence Meets World Again"	September 8, 2024
Another interview with Matthew Lawrence.
223	"TGI – Episode 510 "Last Tango in Philly""	September 11, 2024
A discussion of season 5, episode 10, "Last Tango in Philly".
224	"Jonathan Del Arco Meets World"	September 16, 2024
An interview with actor Jonathan Del Arco, who played Nunzio in season 5, 10 "Last Tango in Philly".
225	"TGI – Episode 511 "A Very Topanga Christmas""	September 18, 2024
A discussion of season 5, episode 11 "A Very Topanga Christmas".
226	"Lara Olsen Meets World"	September 22, 2024
An interview with Lara Olsen, who had a hand in writing seven episodes of Boy Meets World.
227	"TGI – Episode 512 "Raging Cory""	September 25, 2024
A discussion of season 5, episode 12 "Raging Cory".
228	"The Pod Meets World Festival"	September 29, 2024
Rider and Will choose five movies to curate for hypothetical film festivals.
229	"TGI – Episode 513 "The Eskimo""	October 2, 2024
A discussion of season 5, episode 13 "The Eskimo".
230	"The Random Years Meets World"	October 6, 2024
A discussion of the short-lived sitcom The Random Years, in which Will co-starred.
231	"TGI – Episode 514 "Raging Cory""	October 9, 2024
A discussion of season 5, episode 14 "Raging Cory".
232	"William "Rusty" Russ Meets World Again"	October 13, 2024
Another interview with William Russ.
233	"TGI – Episode 515 "First Girlfriends' Club""	October 16, 2024
A discussion of season 5, episode 15 "First Girlfriends' Club".
234	"Prop Master David Glazer Meets World"	October 20, 2024
An interview with David Glazer, who was the property master for all seven seasons of Boy Meets World.
235	"TGI – Episode 516 "Torn Between Two Lovers (Feeling Like a Fool)""	October 23, 2024
A discussion of season 5, episode 16 "Torn Between Two Lovers (Feeling Like a Fool)".
236	"From the Fans: And Then There Was Shawn"	October 25, 2024
Before their recap of the episode, Rider, Danielle and Will listen to voice memos from fans to get their opinion.
237	"Rider's Office Hours: And Then There Was Horror"	October 27, 2024
Rider and scholar Kristopher Woofter discuss horror of the 1990s.
238	"TGI – Episode 517 "And Then There Was Shawn""	October 30, 2024
A discussion of season 5, episode 17 "And Then There Was Shawn".
239	"And Then There Was Jeff McCracken"	November 3, 2024
Jeff McCraken, who directed "And Then There Was Shawn", discuss his approach to the episode.
240	"And Then There Was Jeff Menell"	November 4, 2024
Jeff Menell, who wrote "And Then There Was Shawn", gives his perspective on the episode.
241	"TGI – Episode 518 "If You Can't Be with the One You Love...""	November 6, 2024
A discussion of Season 5, episode 18 "If You Can't Be with the One You Love..."
242	"From the Fans: Is it a Trap?"	November 8, 2024
Rider, Danielle and Will debate Topanga's romantic intentions in season 5, episode 16 "Torn Between Two Lovers (Feeling Like a Fool)".
243	"Vanessa Evigan Meets World"	November 11, 2024
An interview with actress Vanessa Evigan, who played Kimberly in season 5, episode 18 "If You Can't Be with the One You Love..."
244	"TGI – Episode 519 "Eric Hollywood""	November 13, 2024
A discussion of season 5, episode 19 "Eric Hollywood".
245	"Andy Guerdat Meets World"	November 18, 2024
An interview with Andy Guerdat, who was hired as a freelance writer on Boy Meets World and wrote the scripts for season 5, episode 4 "Fraternity Row" and season 5 episode 11 "A Very Topanga Christmas".
246	"TGI – Episode 520 "Starry Night""	November 20, 2024
A discussion of season 5, episode 20 "Starry Night".
247	"Danica McKellar Meets World"	November 24, 2024
An interview with actress Danica McKellar.
248	"TGI – Episode 521 "Honesty Night""	November 27, 2024
A discussion of season 5, episode 21 "Honesty Night".
249	"A Pod Meets World Thanksgiving"	November 28, 2024
Rider, Danielle and Will gather at Rider's childhood home to discuss all the things for which they are thankful.
250	"Pod Meets Gift Guide w/ Bill Daniels and Bonnie Bartlett"	November 29, 2024
Rider, Will, Danielle and her husband Jensen give suggestions for Christmas gifts. Also, William Daniels and Bonnie Bartlett offers gym tips.
251	"Matt Kirkwood Meets World"	December 2, 2024
An interview with actor Matt Kirkwood, who was a stand-in for 6 out of the 7 seasons of Boy Meets World and even appeared in seven episodes as that many characters.
252	"TGI – Episode 522 "Prom-ises, Prom-ises""	December 4, 2024
A discussion of season 5, episode 22 "Prom-ises, Prom-ises".
253	"From the Fans: The Drinking Episode"	December 6, 2024
Rider, Danielle and Will debate fan opinions on whether or not season 5, episode 18 "If You Can't be with the One You Love..." should have been banned from airing on the Disney Channel.
254	"John Beck Meets World"	December 8, 2024
An interview with John Beck, who was a production assistant on Boy Meets World.
255	"TGI – Episode 523 "Things Change""	December 11, 2024
A discussion of season 5, episode 23 "Things Change".
256	"TGI – Episode 524 "Graduation""	December 18, 2024
A discussion of season 5, episode 24 "Graduation".
257	"Bruh Meets World...Meets World (Season 5 Recap)"	December 22, 2024
Rider, Danielle and Will sit down with the hosts of fan podcast "Bruh Meets World" to recap season 5.
258	"The Night Before Christmas with William Daniels"	December 23, 2024
William Daniels recites the classic poem "The Night Before Christmas".
259	"2025 Meets World"	December 29, 2024
Rider, Danielle and Will's final episode of 2024.
260	"The Pod Meets World Draft: Season 4"	January 1, 2025
Rider, Danielle and Will discuss their favorite episodes of season 4.
261	"Jaleel White Meets World"	January 5, 2025
An interview with actor Jaleel White.
262	"The Pod Meets World Season 5 Draft"	January 9, 2025
Rider, Danielle and Will discuss their favorite episodes of season 5.
263	"Kal Penn Meets World"	January 12, 2025
An interview with actor Kal Penn, who appeared as an unnamed audience member on season 4, episode 19 "Quiz Show".
264	"Pod Meets WWE RAW"	January 13, 2025
Rider, Danielle and Will discuss the then-recent wildfires in California, among other topics.
265	"Michael Shea Meets World"	January 19, 2025
An interview with Michael Shea, who was a second assistant director on Boy Meets World.
266	"From the Fans: Topanga's Yale Decision"	January 21, 2025
Rider, Danielle and Will debate whether Topanga should have gone to Yale University or stayed in Philadelphia.
267	"Be Kind, Rewind: "Once in Love with Amy" with Lee Norris"	January 23, 2025
Rider Danielle, Will and Lee Norris re-evaluate season 1, episode 12 "Once in Love with Amy".
268	"Liv Morgan Meets World"	January 27, 2025
An interview with professional wrestler and Boy Meets World fan Liv Morgan.
269	"Be Kind, Rewind: "Pop Quiz" with Blake Sennett"	January 30, 2025
Rider, Danielle, Will and Blake Sennett re-evaluate season 2, episode 20 "Pop Quiz".
270	"Barbie Adler Meets World"	February 3, 2025
An interview with Barbie Adler, who wrote six episodes of Boy Meets World.
271	"Q&A Meets World (Strikes Back)"	February 6, 2025
Rider, Danielle and Will answer another round of fan questions.
272	"Kevin and Tracey Thompson Meet World"	February 10, 2025
An interview with Kevin and Tracey Thompson, a married actor couple who frequently stood in for young actors on Boy Meets World.
273	"Phil Rosenthal Meets World"	February 11, 2025
An interview with musician Phil Rosenthal, who wrote the theme song used for Boy Meets World from season 5 onward.
274	"Be Kind, Rewind: "The Thrilla' in Phila'" with Mark Blutman"	February 13, 2025
Rider, Danielle, Will and Boy Meets World writer Mark Blutman re-evaluate season 2, episode 21 "The Thrilla' in Phila'".
275	"Jim Janicek Meets World"	February 17, 2025
An interview with Jim Janicek, who is credited with initiating the TGIF programming block.
276	"TGI – Episode 601 "His Answer""	February 19, 2025
A discussion of season 6, episode 1 "His Answer".
277	"Maitland Ward Meets World"	February 23, 2025
An interview with actress Maitland Ward, who played Rachel McGuire on the final two seasons of Boy Meets World.
278	"TGI – Episode 602 "Her Answer (Part 2)""	February 26, 2025
A discussion of season 6, episode 2 "Her Answer".
279	"Stephen Park Meets World"	March 3, 2025
An interview with actor Stephen Park, who played Jump Master in season 5, episode 14 "Raging Cory".
280	"TGI – Episode 603 "Ain't College Great?""	March 5, 2025
A discussion of season 6, episode 3 "Ain't College Great?"
281	"Howard Busgang Meets World"	March 9, 2025
An interview with Boy Meets World writer Howard Busgang.
282	"TGI – Episode 604 "Friendly Persuasion""	March 12, 2025
A discussion of season 4, episode 4 "Friendly Persuasion".
283	"Patti Carr Meets World"	March 17, 2025
An interview with Boy Meets World writer Patti Carr.
284	"TGI – Episode 605 "Better Than Your Average Cory""	March 19, 2025
A discussion of season 5, episode 5 "Better Than Your Average Cory".
285	"Pod Meets World Book Club Ep. 1 - Blob: A Love Story"	March 21, 2025
Rider, Danielle and Will review the book Blob: A Love Story by Maggie Su.
286	"Alexandra Nechita Meets World"	March 23, 2025
An interview with painter Alexandra Nechita.
287	"TGI – Episode 606 "Hogs and Kisses""	March 26, 2025
A discussion of season 6, episode 6 "Hugs and Kisses".
288	"From the Fans: Anatomy of a Feeny Impression"	March 28, 2025
Rider, Danielle and Will debate the perfect way to impersonate William Daniels as George Feeny.
289	"Nick Bakay Meets World"	March 30, 2025
An interview with actor Nick Bakay.
290	"TGI – Episode 607 "Everybody Loves Stuart""	April 2, 2025
A discussion of season 6, episode 7 "Everybody Loves Stuart".
291	"Bronson Pinchot Meets World"	April 6, 2025
An interview with actor Bronson Pinchot.
292	"TGI – Episode 608 "You're Married, You're Dead""	April 9, 2025
A discussion of season 6, episode 8 "You're Married, You're Dead".
293	"Shaun Weiss Meets World"	April 13, 2025
An interview with actor Shaun Weiss.
294	"TGI – Episode 609 "Poetic License: An Ode to Holden Caufield"	April 16, 2025
A discussion of season 6, episode 9 "Poetic License: An Ode to Holden Caufield".
295	"Pod Meets Wrestlemania: The Intro"	April 17, 2025
Rider, Danielle and Will are in Las Vegas, discussing their expectations for WrestleMania 41.
296	"Pod Meets Wrestlemania: Bayley and Liv & Dom"	April 18, 2025
An interview with WrestleMania 41 participants Bayley, Liv Morgan and Dominik Mysterio.
297	"Pod Meets Wrestlemania: Mark Henry & Chelsea Green"	April 18, 2025
An interview with professional wrestlers Mark Henry and Chelsea Green.
298	"Pod Meets EMERGENCY PODCAST: We Hit the JACKPOT!"	April 19, 2025
After Danielle wins thousands of dollars, she, along with Rider and Will, make an impromptu episode.
299	"Pod Meets Wrestlemania: Tiffany Stratton & Danhausen"	April 19, 2025
An interview with professional wrestlers Tiffany Stratton and Danhausen.
300	"Pod Meets Wrestlemania: Wrestlemania 41 Recap"	April 19, 2025
Rider, Danielle and Will deliver their opinions on WrestleMania 41.
301	"Gary H. Miller Meets World"	April 20, 2025
An interview with Boy Meets World writer Gary H. Miller.
302	"TGI – Episode 610 "And In Case I Don't See Ya""	April 23, 2025
A discussion of season 6, episode 10 "And In Case I Don't See Ya".
303	"Bonnie Bartlett Meets World"	April 27, 2025
An interview with Bonnie Bartlett.
304	"TGI – Episode 611 "Santa's Little Helpers""	April 30, 2025
A discussion of season 6, episode 11 "Santa's Little Helpers".
305	"JB Gaynor Meets World"	May 4, 2025
An interview with actor JB Gaynor, who played Tommy on three episodes of Boy Meets World and one episode of Girl Meets World.
306	"Be Kind, Rewind: "Home" with David Kendall"	May 7, 2025
Rider, Danielle, Will and David Kendall re-evaluate season 2, episode 23 "Home", which Kendall directed.
307	"It Came From Reddit: My Fiancé Publicly Humiliated Me"	May 9, 2025
Rider, Danielle and Will do a dramatic read of a "true story" posted on Reddit about a man who was humiliated at his wedding, but got revenge.
308	"Soleil Moon Frye Meets World"	May 12, 2025
An interview with actress Soleil Moon Frye.
309	"Be Kind, Rewind: Her Answer: Part 2" with Betsy Randle"	May 15, 2025
Rider, Danielle, Will and Betsy Randle re-evaluate season 6, episode 2 "Her Answer".
310	"Lynn McCracken Meets World"	May 19, 2025
An interview with Boy Meets World stage manager and director Lynn McCracken.
311	"Be Kind, Rewind: "Back 2 School" with Ethan Suplee"	May 22, 2025
Rider, Danielle, Will and Ethan Suplee re-evaluate season 2, episode 1 "Back 2 School".
312	"Pod Meets World Book Club Ep. 2 - A Deadly Education"	May 23, 2025
Rider, Danielle and Will review the book A Deadly Education by Naomi Novik.
313	"Keone Young Meets World"	May 26, 2025
An interview with actor Keone Young, who played an unnamed professor in season 6, episode 3 "Ain't College Great?"
314	"Pod Meets Office Ladies"	May 29, 2025
Rider, Danielle and Will hang out with Office Ladies hosts Jenna Fischer and Angela Kinsey. Jenna and Angela watch season 4, episode 2 "Hair Today, Goon Tomorrow", which is the first episode of Boy Meets World either of them have ever watched.
315	"Saturday Morning Preview Special"	May 30, 2025
Rider, Danielle and Will rewatch an ABC Saturday Morning Preview Special that they all took part in filming, even though none of them remember it.
316	"Ashley Johnson Meets World"	June 2, 2025
An interview with actress Ashley Johnson.
317	"TGI – Episode 612 "Cutting the Cord""	June 5, 2025
A discussion of season 6, episode 12 "Cutting the Cord".
318	"Heather Marie Marsden Meets World"	June 9, 2025
An interview with actress Heather Marie Marsden, who played Kelly in season 6, episode 12 "Cuttung the Cord".
319	"TGI – Episode 613 "We'll Have a Good Time Then""	June 12, 2025
A discussion of season 6, episode 13 "We'll Have a Good Time Then".
320	"Chicken Soup for the Kid's Soul"	June 13, 2025
Rider, Danielle and Will, discuss the book Chicken Soup for the Kid's Soul, for which Rider and Danielle contributed stories.
321	"Steve Young Meets World"	June 16, 2025
An interview with Boy Meets World writer Steve Young, who wrote season 2, episode 14 "I Am Not a Crook" and season 4, episode 18 "Uncle Daddy".
322	"TGI – Episode 614 "Getting Hitched""	June 19, 2025
A discussion of season 6, episode 14 "Getting Hitched".
323	"It Came from Reddit: My Girlfriend Sald "I Need Space""	June 20, 2025
Rider, Danielle and Will read a Reddit "true story" about a breakup.
324	""The Baby-Sitters Club" Meets World"	June 23, 2025
An interview with actress Larisa Oleynik, who discusses her role in the 1995 film The Baby-Sitters Club, as well as the then-recent cast reunion.
325	"TGI – Episode 615 "Road Trip""	June 26, 2025
A discussion of season 6, episode 15 "Road Trip".
326	"Pod Meets 4th of July"	June 30, 2025
Rider, Danielle and Will discuss their favorite summer foods, among other subjects.
327	"Beverley Mitchell Meets World"	July 7, 2025
An interview with actress Beverley Mitchell.
328	"TGI – Episode 616 "My Baby Valentine""	July 10, 2025
A discussion of season 6, episode 16 "My Baby Valentine".
329	"Nobody's Angel (Ali & Sarah) Meets World"	July 14, 2025
An interview with singers Ali Navarro and Sarah Christine Smith, formerly members of the girl group Nobody's Angel, who appeared as fictionalized versions of themselves on season 6, episode 15 "Road Trip".
330	"TGI – Episode 617 "Resurrection""	July 17, 2025
A dicsussion of season 6, episode 17 "Resurrection".
331	"Erica Montolfo-Bura Meets World"	July 21, 2025
An interview with Boy Meets World staff writer Erica Montolfo-Bura.
332	"TGI – Episode 618 "Can I Help to Cheer You?""	July 24, 2025
A discussion of season 6, episode 18 "Can I Help to Cheer You?"
333	"Pod Meets Proposal"	July 25, 2025
Rider, Danielle and Will discuss how they helped a couple get engaged at one of their live shows.
334	"Pod Meets San Francisco (with How Rude, Tanneritos)"	July 26, 2025
Rider, Danielle and Will, along with Andrea Barber and Jodie Sweetin, test their knowledge of Boy Meets World and/or Full House.
335	"David Brownfield Meets World"	July 28, 2025
An interview with former ABC executive David Brownfield.
336	"TGI – Episode 619 "Bee True""	July 31, 2025
A discussion of season 6, episode 19 "Bee True".
337	"It Came from Reddit: My Fiancé Mocked My Manhood at Our Engagement Dinner"	August 1, 2025
Rider, Danielle and Will read a Reddit "true story" about a wife-to-be who told a cruel joke.
338	"Nate Richert Meets World"	August 4, 2025
An interview with actor Nate Richert.
339	"TGI – Episode 620 "The Truth About Honesty""	August 7, 2025
A discussion of season 6, episode 20 "The Truth About Honesty".
340	"Elisa Donovan Meets World (in SF!)"	August 11, 2025
An interview with actress Elisa Donovan.
341	"TGI – Episode 621 "The Psychotic Episode""	August 14, 2025
A discussion of season 6, episode 21 "The Psychotic Episode".
342	"Backstreet Boys Meet World (Kevin & AJ)"	August 18, 2025
Rider, Danielle and Will hang out with Kevin Richardson and AJ McLean shortly before they and the other Backstreet Boys start their concert at the Sphere.
343	"Carrot Top Meets World"	August 19, 2025
An interview with comedian/actor Carrot Top.
344	"Pod Meets Sphere: Backstreet Boys Recap"	August 19, 2025
Rider, Danielle and Will discuss their experience at the Backstreet Boys concert they attended at the Sphere.
345	"Ashlee Simpson Ross Meets World"	August 21, 2025
An interview with actress/singer Ashlee Simpson Ross.
346	"TGI – Episode 622 "State of the Unions""	August 25, 2025
A discussion of season 6, episode 22 "State of the Unions".
347	"Bruh Meets World...Meets World (Season 6 Recap)"	August 28, 2025
Rider, Danielle and Will sit down with the hosts of the fan podcast "Bruh Meets World" to recap season 6.
348	"Nicole Eggert Meets World"	September 1, 2025
An interview with actress Nicole Eggert, who played Bridget in season 7, episode 10 "Picket Fences".
349	"The Pod Meets World Season 6 Draft"	September 4, 2025
Rider, Danielle and Will discuss their favorite episodes from season 6.
350	"Richard Karn Meets World"	September 8, 2025
An interview with actor Richard Karn.
351	"TGI – Kim Possible Episode 115 "All the News""	September 11, 2025
A discussion of Kim Possible season 1, episode 15, "All the News".
352	"Christy Carlson Romano Meets World"	September 15, 2025
An interview with actress Christy Carlson Romano.
353	"Q&A Meets World! Part 3"	September 18, 2025
Rider, Danielle and Will answer some more questions from fans.
354	"Ernie Reyes Jr. Meets World"	September 22, 2025
An interview with actor/martial artist Ernie Reyes Jr.
355	"Marc Summers Meets World"	September 25, 2025
An interview with TV personality Marc Summers.
356	"Marcus Toji Meets World"	September 29, 2025
An interview with actor Marcus Toji, who played two different characters in season 4 of Boy Meets World.
357	"The Pod Meets World Yearbook Superlatives (Round 1)"	October 2, 2025
In light of the fact that they have only one more season of Boy Meets World to discuss, Rider, Danielle and Will start making a hypothetical yearbook for the show.
358	"Zach Gilford Meets World"	October 6, 2025
An interview with actor Zach Gilford.
359	"The Pod Meets World Yearbook Superlatives (Round 2)"	October 9, 2025
Rider, Danielle and Will finish their hypothetical yearbook for Boy Meets World.
360	"Mena Suvari Meets World"	October 13, 2025
An inter with actress Mena Suvari, who appeared on two episodes of Boy Meets World as two different characters.
361	"TGI – Sabrina the Teenage Witch 105 "A Halloween Story""	October 16, 2025
A discussion of Sabrina the Teenage Witch season 1, episode 5 "A Halloween Story".
362	"Michael Stephenson Meets World"	October 20, 2025
An interview with filmmaker/actor Michael Stephenson.
363	"TGI – Family Matters 807 "Stevil""	October 23, 2025
A discussion of Family Matters season 8, episode 7 "Stevil".
364	"Kelsey Grammer Meets World"	October 27, 2025
An interview with actor Kelsey Grammer.
365	"TGI – Fresh Prince of Bel-Air 407 "Hex and the Single Guy""	October 30, 2025
A discussion of The Fresh Prince of Bel-Air season 4, episode 7 "Hex and the Single Guy".
366	"Kerr Smith Meets World"	November 3, 2025
An interview with actor Kerr Smith.
367	"Trish Stratus Meets World"	November 10, 2025
An interview with professional wrestler Trish Stratus.
368	"TGI – M*A*S*H 810 "The Yalu Brick Road""	November 13, 2025
A discussion of M*A*S*H season 8, episode 10 "The Yalu Brick Road".
369	"Madeline Zima Meets World"	November 17, 2025
An interview with actress Madeline Zima.
370	"TGI – Family Matters 907 "Stevil II: This Time's He's Not Alone""	November 20, 2025
A discussion of Family Matters season 9, episode 7 "Stevil II: This Time He's Not Alone".
371	"Matt Johnson Meets World"	November 24, 2025
An interview with writer/producer/director/actor Matt Johnson.
372	"TGI –Friends 809 "The One with the Rumor""	November 27, 2025
A discussion of Friends season 8, episode 9, "The One with the Rumor".
373	"Phil Glasser Meets World"	December 1, 2025
An interview with producer and former actor Phil Glasser, who played Ubaldo in season 2, episode 5 "The Uninvited".
374	"Busy Philipps Meets World"	December 4, 2025
An interview with actress Busy Philipps.
375	"Pod Meets Disney California Adventure"	December 6, 2025
Rider, Danielle and Will discuss their recent trip to Disney California Adventure, among other topics.
376	"Nicholle Tom Meets World"	December 8, 2025
An interview with actress Nicholle Tom.
377	"TGI – Full House 209 "Our Very First Christmas Show""	December 11, 2025
A discussion of Full House season 2, episode 9 "Our Very First Christmas Show".
378	"Joe Hendry Meets World"	December 12, 2025
An interview with professional wrestler Joe Hendry.
379	"TGI – Home Improvement 112 "Yule Better Watch Out""	December 18, 2025
A discussion of Home Improvement season 1, episode 12 "Yule Better Watch Out".
380	"How We Made Your Mother Meets World (PART 1)"	December 22, 2025
An interview with How I Met Your Mother co-creator Craig Thomas and star Josh Radnor, who host their own rewatch podcast "How We Made Your Mother".
381	"How We Made Your Mother Meets World (PART 2)"	December 22, 2025
A continuation of the interview from part 1.
382	"The Night Before Christmas with William Daniels"	December 24, 2025
For the second Christmas in a row, William Daniels recites the poem "The Night Before Christmas".
383	"Pod Meets 50 Million Downloads PART 1"	December 31, 2025
Rider, Danielle and Will are at Yaamava' Resort & Casino to celebrate reaching 50 million downloads of their podcast.
384	"Pod Meets 50 Million Downloads PART 2"	December 31, 2025
A continuation of the celebration from part 1.
385	"Walter Emanuel Jones Meets World"	January 5, 2026
An interview with actor Walter Emanuel Jones.
386	"TGI – Episode 701 "Show Me The Love""	January 8, 2026
A discussion of season 7, episode 1 "Show Me The Love".
387	"Tiffany Meets World"	January 12, 2026
An interview with singer Tiffany.
388	"TGI – Episode 702 "For Love and Apartments""	January 15, 2025
A discussion of season 7, episode 2 "For Love and Apartments".
389	"Mick Foley Meets World"	January 19, 2026
An interview with professional wrestler Mick Foley, who appeared as his "Mankind" persona in season 7, episode 2 "For Love and Apartments".
390	"TGI – Episode 703 "Angela's Men""	January 22, 2026
A discussion of season 7, episode 3 "Angela's Men".
391	"Matthew Lawrence Meets World Once Again"	January 26, 2026
Another interview with actor Matthew Lawrence.
392	"TGI – Episode 704 "No Such Thing as a Sure Thing""	January 29, 2026
A discussion of season 7, episode 4 "No Sure Thing as a Sure Thing".
393	"TGI – Episode 705 "You Light Up My Union""	February 5, 2026
A discussion of season 7, episode 5 "You Light Up My Union".
394	"Lindsay Ridgeway Meets World Again"	February 9, 2026
Another interview with actress Lindsay Ridgeway.
395	"TGI – Episode 706 "They're Killing Us""	February 12, 2026
A discussion of season 7, episode 6 "They're Killing Us".
396	"Q&A Meets World! Part 4"	February 16, 2026
Rider, Danielle and Will answer some more questions from fans.
397	"TGI – Episode 707 "It's About Time""	February 19, 2026
A discussion of season 7, episode 7 "It's About Time".
398	"Jonathan Lipnicki Meets World"	February 23, 2026
An interview with actor Jonathan Lipnicki.
399	"TGI – Episode 708 "The Honeymooners""	February 26, 2026
A discussion of season 7, episode 8 "The Honeymooners".
400	"Julie Yang Silver Meets World"	March 2, 2026
An interview with Boy Meets World costumer Julie Yang Silver.
401	"TGI – Episode 709 "The Honeymoon is Over""	March 5, 2026
A discussion of season 7, episode 9 "The Honeymoon is Over".
402	"Jeff Menell Meets World Again"	March 9, 2026
Another interview with Boy Meets World writer/producer Jeff Menell.
403	"TGI – Episode 710 "Picket Fences" Part 1"	March 12, 2026
A discussion of season 7, episode 10 "Picket Fences".
404	"TGI – Episode 710 "Picket Fences" Part 2"	March 12, 2026
A continuation of the discussion from part 1.
405	"Brian Austin Green Meets World"	March 16, 2026
An interview with actor Brian Austin Green.
406	"TGI – Episode 711 "What a Drag!""	March 19, 2026
A discussion of season 7, episode 11 "What a Drag!"
407	"Jason Biggs Meets World"	March 23, 2026
An interview with actor Jason Biggs.
408	"TGI – Episode 712 "Family Trees" Part 1"	March 26, 2026
A discussion of season 7, episode 12 "Family Trees".
409	"TGI – Episode 712 "Family Trees" Part 2"	March 26, 2026
A continuation of the discussion from part 1.
410	"David Chokachi Meets World"	March 30, 2026
An interview with actor David Chokachi.
411	"TGI – Episode 713 "The Provider""	April 2, 2026
A discussion of season 7, episode 13 "The Provider".
412	"Marisol Nichols Meets World"	April 6, 2026
An interview with actress Marisol Nichols, who played Kelly in two episodes of Boy Meets World.
413	"TGI – Episode 714 "I'm Gonna Be Like You, Dad""	April 9, 2026
A discussion of season 7, episode 14, "I'm Gonna Be Like You, Dad".
414	"Allison M. Gibson Meets World"	April 13, 2026
An interview with Allison M. Gibson, who wrote four episodes of Boy Meets World.
415	"Pod Meets Wrestlemania: Enter the Ring"	April 16, 2026
Danielle and Will are in Las Vegas for WrestleMania 42. Note: Rider Strong is absent for this episode.
416	"Pod Meets Wrestlemania: Rhea Ripley"	April 16, 2026
An interview with professional wrestler Rhea Ripley. Note: Rider Strong is absent for this episode.
417	"Pod Meets Wrestlemania: Charlotte Flair"	April 17, 2026
An interview with professional wrestler Charlotte Flair.
418	"Pod Meets Wrestlemania: AJ Lee"	April 18, 2026
An interview with professional wrestler AJ Lee. Note: Rider Strong is absent for this episode.
419	"Pod Meets Wrestlemania: CM Punk"	April 18, 2026
An interview with professional wrestler CM Punk. Note: Rider Strong is absent for this episode.
420	"Pod Meets Wrestlemania: Kit Wilson"	April 19, 2026
An interview with professional wrestler Kit Wilson. Note: Rider Strong is absent for this episode.
421	"Pod Meets Wrestlemania: The Final Bell"	April 20, 2026
Danielle and Will wrap up their weekend at WrestleMania 42. Note: Rider Strong is absent for this episode.
422	"TGI – Episode 715 "The War""	April 23, 2026
A discussion of season 7, episode 15 "The War".
423	"Tatyana Ali Meets World"	April 27, 2026
An interview with actress/singer Tatyana Ali.
424	"TGI – Episode 716 "Seven the Hard Way""	April 30, 2026
A discussion of season 7, episode 16 "Seven the Hard Way".
425	"Glen Merzer Meets World"	May 4, 2026
An interview with Glen Merzer, who co-wrote three episodes of Boy Meets World with Jeff Menell.
426	"TGI – Episode 717 "She's Having My Baby Back Ribs" Part 1"	May 7, 2026
A discussion of season 7, episode 17 "She's Having My Baby Back Ribs".
427	"TGI – Episode 717 "She's Having My Baby Back Ribs Part 2"	May 7, 2026
A continuation of the discussion from part 1.
428	"A Tribute to David Kendall (1957 - 2026)"	May 10, 2026
Rider, Danielle, Will and others pay tribute to Boy Meets World writer/producer/director David Kendall, who died eight days prior to this episode's release.
429	"A Closer Look with Dr. Hillary Goldsher"	May 11, 2026
Psychologist Hillary Goldsher joins Rider, Danielle and Will to give her opinion on season 7, episode 17 "She's Having My Baby Back Ribs".
430	"TGI – Episode 718 "How Cory and Topanga Got Their Groove Back""	May 14, 2026
A discussion of season 7, episode 18 "How Cory and Topanga Got Their Groove Back".
431	"Shannon Elizabeth Meets World"	May 18, 2026
An interview with actress Shannon Elizabeth.
432	"TGI – Episode 719 "Brotherly Shove""	May 21, 2026
A discussion of season 7, episode 19 "Brotherly Shove".
433	"Jennie Garth Meets World"	May 25, 2026
An interview with actress Jennie Garth.
434	"Andrew Levitas Meets World"	June 1, 2026
An interview with filmmaker Andrew Levitas, who played Luther in season 7, episode 11 "What a Drag!"
435	"Gamebox 1.0 Meets World"	June 4, 2026
A discussion of the movie Gamebox 1.0, in which Danielle played Kate.
436	"Dr Forbes Riley Meets World"	June 8, 2026
An interview with informercial host, Dr Forbes Riley, who played a tv reporter in season 7, episode 18 "How Cory and Topanga Got Their Groove Back".
437	"TGI – Episode 720 "As Time Goes By""	June 11, 2026
A discussion of season 7, episode 20 "As Time Goes By".
438	"Tribeca Film Festival Meets World"	June 13, 2026
A discussion of The first public screening of the groups documentary 'Doc Meets World' at the Tribeca Film Festival.
439	"Holly Robison Peete Meets World"	June 15, 2026
An interview with fellow TGIF actor Holly Robinson Peete.
440	"TGI – Episode 721 "Angela's Ashes""	June 18, 2026
A discussion of season 7, episode 21 "Angela's Ashes".
441	"Danny Pintauro Meets World"	June 22, 2026
An Interview with actor Danny Pintauro.
442	"Q&A Meets World: the End of the Recap Era Part 1"	June 25, 2026
Rider, Danielle and Will answer some questions from fans as the recap era ends.
443	"Q&A Meets World: the End of the Recap Era Part 2"	June 25, 2026
Rider, Danielle and Will answer some more questions from fans as the recap era ends.
444	"4th of July Meets World"	June 29, 2026
Rider, Danielle and Will discuss their 4th of July plans.
445	"Danny Strong Meets World"	July 6, 2026
An interview with actor, Danny Strong who guest starred in season 3 episode 15 "The Heart Is a Lonely Hunter".
446	"TGI – Episode 722 "Brave New World: Part 1""	July 9, 2026
A discussion of the penultimate episode season 7, episode 22 "Brave New World: Part 1".
447	"David Faustino Meets World"	July 13, 2026
An interview with actor, David Faustino.
448	"The Feeny Awards Part 1"	July 16, 2026
Rider, Danielle and Will hold the Feeny awards to discuss the best of the series.
449	"The Feeny Awards Part 2"	July 20, 2026
Rider, Danielle and Will continue the Feeny awards to discuss the best of the series.
450	"The Peeny Awards"	July 23, 2026
Rider, Danielle and Will hold the Peeny awards to discuss the best of the podcast.
451	"Jeff McCracken Meets World: The Finale"	July 27, 2026
Another interview with director, Jeff McCracken to discuss the finale.
452	"TGI – Episode 722 "Brave New World: Part 2""	July 30, 2026
A discussion of the Finale season 7, episode 23 "Brave New World: Part 2" live from the IHeartRadio Theater.
453	"Raw Meets World Part 1 (Ethan Page and Sol Ruca)"	August 3, 2026
An interview with professional wrestlers Ethan Page and Sol Ruca. Note: Rider Strong is absent for this episode.
454	"Raw Meets World Part 2 (Raquel Rodriguez and Maxxine Dupri)"	August 3, 2026
An interview with professional wrestlers Raquel Rodriguez and Maxxine Dupri. Note: Rider Strong is absent for this episode.
455	"The Pod Meets World Season 7 Draft"	August 6, 2026
Rider, Danielle and Will discuss their favorite episodes from season 7.
456	"Bruh Meets World... Meets World (Season 7 Recap)"	August 10, 2026
Rider, Danielle and Will sit down with the hosts of fan podcast "Bruh Meets World" to recap season 7.
457	"Welcome to Girl Meets World"	August 13, 2026
Rider, Danielle and Will discuss the gap between the Boy Meets World finale and the premiere of Girl Meets World.
458	"Greg Evigan Meets World"	August 17, 2026
An interview with actor Greg Evigan.
459	"Girl Meets – Episode 101"	August 20, 2026
A discussion of the first episode of Girl Meets World, season 1, episode 1 "Girl Meets World".
460	"Live for a Top 4 Major Streamer!"	August 24, 2026
A discussion of the podcasts new video episodes on Disney+ live from the IHeartRadio Theater.
461	"Will's 50th Birthday Prom Recap"	August 24, 2026
Rider, Danielle and Will Recap Will's prom themed 50th Birthday party.
462	"Girl Meets – Episode 102"	August 27, 2026
A discussion of Girl Meets World, season 1, episode 2 "Girl Meets Boy".
463	"The Final Pod Meets World Episode Draft"	August 31, 2026
Rider, Danielle and Will discuss their favorite episodes from the whole series.
464	"Girl Meets – Episode 103"	September 3, 2026
A discussion of Girl Meets World, season 1, episode 3 "Girl Meets Sneak Attack".
465	"Paint Meets World"	September 7, 2026
Rider, Danielle and Will attempt to paint a landscape guided by an instructor.
466	"Girl Meets – Episode 104"	September 10, 2026
A discussion of Girl Meets World, season 1, episode 4 "Girl Meets Father".
