= Will Friedle =

American actor (born 1976)

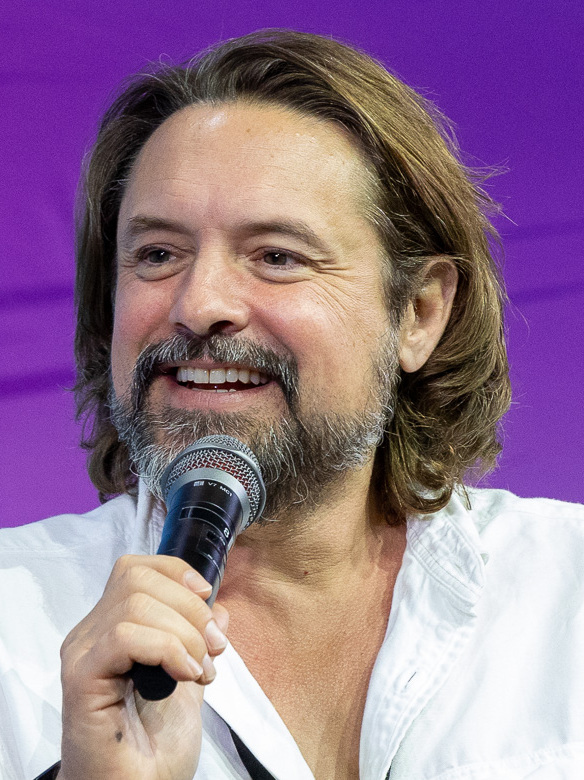
- Friedle in 2025
- Born: August 11, 1976 (age 50); Hartford, Connecticut, U.S.
- Education: Avon High School
- Occupation: Actor
- Years active: 1988–present
- Known for: Boy Meets World; Kim Possible; Transformers: Robots in Disguise; Batman Beyond
- Spouse: Susan Martens (m. 2016)

Signature
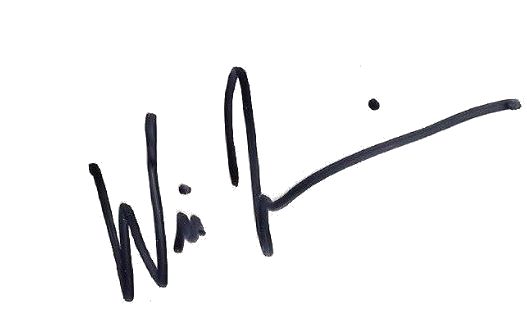

Will Friedle (/ˈfrɪdɛl/; born August 11, 1976) is an American actor and screenwriter. He is best known for his role as Eric Matthews in the ABC sitcom Boy Meets World (1993–2000).

In animation, Friedle's first voice acting role was the lead role of Terry McGinnis / Batman in Batman Beyond (1999–2001). He played a devil in H-E Double Hockey Sticks which also starred Matthew Lawrence. He also voiced Ron Stoppable in Kim Possible (2002–2007), Doyle Blackwell in The Secret Saturdays (2008), Jaime Reyes / Blue Beetle in Batman: The Brave and the Bold (2008–2011), Lion-O in the 2011–12 reboot of ThunderCats, Bumblebee in the Transformers franchise (2013–2017), Star-Lord in Guardians of the Galaxy (2015–2019), and Kashaw Vesh in The Legend of Vox Machina (2022).

== Early life ==
Friedle was born in Hartford, Connecticut, the youngest of three boys of Patricia Joan (née Leary) and Gary Allen Friedle, both lawyers. His older brothers are Gary and Greg Friedle. He is of Irish, Dutch, German, and about 20% Ashkenazi Jewish heritage. After committing himself to becoming an actor, Friedle continually commuted from Avon, Connecticut, to New York City for auditions. He graduated from Avon High School in 1994.

Friedle is allegedly credited on school brochures as having attended Occidental College. However, when interviewed on the February 11, 2019, episode of Critical Role: Between the Sheets, he admitted having never attended the school. He stated that he learned he was being inaccurately credited by Occidental College as being an alumnus when his nephew visited the school and showed him the information package. Occidental College is not able to confirm that Friedle was ever used on marketing brochures; however, co-star Rider Strong attended Occidental College briefly during the filming of Boy Meets World. Additionally, he stated that he studied Latin for six years because he intended to become an archaeologist eventually. In the July 4, 2006, issue of People, Friedle mentioned he had thought about attending culinary school.

== Career ==
After co-hosting Nickelodeon's Don't Just Sit There! for three seasons (1988–1991), Friedle's breakthrough came when he was cast as Cory Matthews's likeable but underachieving elder brother Eric on the long-running TV sitcom Boy Meets World from 1993 to 2000, replacing original choice Harry Barandes after the pilot was shot. In 1998, he starred with Elisabeth Harnois, Dabney Coleman, and Jay Thomas in My Date with the President's Daughter as part of The Wonderful World of Disney.

In 2004, he co-starred with Chris Owen in the independent film National Lampoon's Gold Diggers (originally titled Lady Killers). He also appeared in a supporting role in the 2005 ABC Family film Everything You Want. Friedle was cast as Mike in Off Centre, but could not accept the role because of a previous commitment to The Random Years. The role ended up going to Eddie Kaye Thomas.

In December 2013, in spite of initial reluctance, it was announced that Friedle would reprise his role as Eric in the sequel series Girl Meets World.

=== Voice acting ===
Friedle's first voice-acting role was the lead role in Batman Beyond (1999–2001) in which he provided the voice of Terry McGinnis / Batman. He has reprised this role in multiple DC animated projects such as The Zeta Project (2001), Static Shock (2004), Justice League Unlimited (2004), and Justice League: Crisis on Infinite Earths (2024). In April 2014, it was confirmed that Friedle reprised his Batman Beyond role of Terry McGinnis on the Batman Beyond short made by Darwyn Cooke to commemorate Batman’s 75th anniversary. He also, at one point, replaced Joaquin Phoenix as Kenai in an unsuccessful pilot for a television series based on the 2003 Disney film Brother Bear.

Friedle voiced Seifer Almasy in the English-language version of the video game Kingdom Hearts II (2005), Gideon Wyeth in the English-language version of the video game Advent Rising (2005), and Jaster Rogue in the English-language version of the video game Rogue Galaxy (2005). From 2008 to 2011, he voiced Jaime Reyes / Blue Beetle on Batman: The Brave and the Bold.

In 2013, Entertainment Weekly commented that "Friedle has largely ditched on-camera acting for voiceover work", although he is "nevertheless best known as Eric Matthews, Cory's cute but dim brother on Boy Meets World". In 2015, Bustle highlighted that "after Boy Meets World was over, Friedle mostly went on to do mainly animated voice roles" and that he has "provided the voice of characters like Ron Stoppable (Kim Possible), Fang (Teen Titans), Ken Tennyson (Ben 10: Alien Force), and Kid Flash (Teen Titans Go!) — which is literally just a small handful of the numerous cartoons his voice can be heard in, either as a series regular or just for a single episode".

From 2015 to 2019, he starred as Star-Lord on Guardians of the Galaxy.

In 2022, he reprised his role of Kashaw Vesh in The Legend of Vox Machina, an adaptation of the web series Critical Role; he originally appeared as Kashaw in the first campaign (2015–2017) of the actual play as a guest player. On June 15, 2022, Friedle voiced Radiant Black in a promotional online short.

=== Podcasts and web series ===
From July 2017 to November 2018, Friedle hosted three seasons of the web series Geek & Sundry Painters Guild. The show originated from Friedle "painting" a miniature with "magic marker" and, after discovering this, Marisha Ray pitched Friedle on a show where he would be taught to paint miniatures correctly by various experts. After the conclusion of that series, Ray reached out to pitch Mini Primetime (2019) where Friedle would host a similar painting show for Critical Role's new YouTube channel. On June 27, 2019, the premiere episode of Christy's Kitchen Throwback featuring Friedle was uploaded to Christy Carlson Romano's YouTube channel.

Friedle and Romano co-hosted the podcast called I Hear Voices from 2022 to 2023, which was available on Romano's YouTube channel and other podcast providers. In June 2022, the podcast did a Kim Possible 20th-anniversary special episode with creators Mark McCorkle and Bob Schooley and voice actors John DiMaggio (Drakken) and Nicole Sullivan (Shego), as well as a brand new Kim Possible scene with the four actors written by McCorkle and Schooley, and directed by original voice director Lisa Schaffer. He has hosted the Boy Meets World rewatch podcast Pod Meets World with Danielle Fishel and Rider Strong since 2022.

In 2024, he began to co-host the rewatch podcast Magical Rewind with Sabrina Bryan, which focuses on Disney Channel Original Movies.

== Personal life ==
In 1997, Friedle briefly dated actress Jennifer Love Hewitt. He co-starred with her in the romantic teen comedy Trojan War, and Hewitt parodied herself in the Boy Meets World episode "And Then There Was Shawn". He married his girlfriend Susan Martens on September 25, 2016, in Connecticut. His affectionate name for her is Mrs. Squirrels, referencing Eric's nickname "Plays With Squirrels" from the final season of Boy Meets World.

Friedle is best friends with actor Jason Marsden and was the best man at his wedding in October 2004. The two also worked together in numerous productions such as Boy Meets World, Trojan War, Static Shock, Kim Possible, Batman Beyond, Justice League Unlimited, Batman: The Brave and the Bold, ThunderCats, Transformers: Rescue Bots, and Mad.

== Filmography ==
=== Film ===
Year	Title	Role	Notes
1997	Trojan War	Brad Kimble	
2000	Batman Beyond: Return of the Joker	Terry McGinnis / Batman	Voice, direct-to-video
2003	National Lampoon's Gold Diggers	Calvin Menhoffer	
2004	Howl's Moving Castle	Additional voices	English dub
2008	Batman: Gotham Knight	Anton, Cultist, Youth #1	Voice, direct-to-video
2015	Batman Unlimited: Animal Instincts	Nightwing	Voice, direct-to-video
2015	Batman Unlimited: Monster Mayhem	Nightwing	Voice, direct-to-video
2016	Lego DC Comics Super Heroes: Justice League – Gotham City Breakout	Nightwing	Voice, direct-to-video
2016	Batman Unlimited: Mech vs. Mutants	Nightwing	Voice, direct-to-video
2017	The Jetsons & WWE: Robo-WrestleMania!	Mayor Mercury	Voice, direct-to-video
2018	Batman Ninja	Red Robin, Laughing Mask Samurai	Voice, direct-to-video
2019	Lego DC Batman: Family Matters	Nightwing	Voice, direct-to-video
2021	My Little Pony: A New Generation	Skye Silver, Glitter Cupcake, Comet Tail, Commercial Voice	Voice
2022	Teen Titans Go! & DC Super Hero Girls: Mayhem in the Multiverse	Aquaman, Lex Luthor	Voice, direct-to-video
2023	Lego Marvel Avengers: Code Red	Hydra Goons	Voice, Disney+ special
2024	Justice League: Crisis on Infinite Earths	Batman / Terry McGinnis, Kamandi	Voice, direct-to-video
2024	Isla Monstro	El Feo	Voice
2024	Lego Marvel Avengers: Mission Demolition	Demolition Man / Dennis Dunphy	Voice, Disney+ special

=== Television ===
Year	Title	Role	Notes
1990	True Blue	Billy	Episode: "Caves"
1992	Law & Order	Russ	Episode: "Trust"
1993–2000	Boy Meets World	Eric Matthews	158 episodes
1994	Are You Afraid of the Dark?	Jimmy Armstrong	Episode: "The Tale of the Long Ago Locket"
1996	ABC Afterschool Special	Jason Gallagher	Episode: "Educating Mom"
1998	My Date with the President's Daughter	Duncan Fletcher	Television film
1999	H-E Double Hockey Sticks	Griffelkin	Television film
1999	Zoe, Duncan, Jack & Jane	Jeremy Pinter	Episode: "A Good Man Is Hard to Find"
1999	Odd Man Out	Phillip Evans	Episode: "Punch Line"
1999–2001	Batman Beyond	Terry McGinnis / Batman	Voice, main role
2001	The Zeta Project	Terry McGinnis / Batman	Voice, episode: "Shadows"
2001	3rd Rock from the Sun	Stan	Episode: "Dick Soup for the Soul"
2001	Go Fish	Pete Troutner	5 episodes
2002	The Random Years	Alex	Main Character
2002–07	Kim Possible	Ron Stoppable	Voice, main role
2003	Regular Joe	Larry	Episode: "Time and Punishment"
2003	Kim Possible: A Sitch in Time	Ron Stoppable	Voice, television film
2003, 2005	Lilo & Stitch: The Series	Ron Stoppable, Mackey Macaw Manager	Voice, 2 episodes
2004	Static Shock	Terry McGinnis / Batman	Voice, episode: "Future Shock"
2004	Teen Titans	Fang	Voice, episode: "Date with Destiny"
2004	Less Than Perfect	Caleb	Episode: "Claude Wants to Know"
2004–05	Justice League Unlimited	Kyle Rayner / Green Lantern, Terry McGinnis / Batman	Voice, 3 episodes
2005	Kim Possible: So the Drama	Ron Stoppable	Voice, television film
2005	Everything You Want	Calvin Dillwaller	Television film
2005	The Batman	Gearhead	Voice, episode: "RPM"
2006	American Dragon: Jake Long	Cousin Greggy	Voice, episode: "Feeding Frenzy"
2008	Ben 10: Alien Force	Ken Tennyson	Voice, episode: "Max Out"
2008–10	The Secret Saturdays	Doyle Blackwell	Voice, 16 episodes
2008–11	Batman: The Brave and the Bold	Jaime Reyes / Blue Beetle, Scarlet Scarab	Voice, 15 episodes
2010–11	Sym-Bionic Titan	Bryan, Jason, Student #1	Voice, 4 episodes
2010–11	The Penguins of Madagascar	Randy	Voice, 2 episodes
2011–12	ThunderCats	Lion-O	Voice, 24 episodes
2011–13	Mad	Various	Voice, 10 episodes
2012	Green Lantern: The Animated Series	Prince Ragnar	Voice, 2 episodes
2012	Gravity Falls	Reginald	Voice, episode: "The Legend of the Gobblewonker"
2012–13	Winx Club	Nereus	Voice, 9 episodes; Nickelodeon dub
2013	Transformers: Prime	Bumblebee	Voice, episode: "Deadlock"
2013	Transformers Prime Beast Hunters: Predacons Rising	Bumblebee	Voice, television film
2013	Monsters vs. Aliens	Man-Beast	Voice, episode: "Curse of the Man-Beast"
2013, 2016	Ultimate Spider-Man	Deadpool, additional voices	Voice, 2 episodes
2014	Turbo Fast	Fusion	Voice, episode: "Beat-A Fajita"
2014–17	Transformers: Robots in Disguise	Bumblebee, additional voices	Voice, 68 episodes
2015	Avengers Assemble	Star-Lord, Jeter Kan Toon	Voice, 3 episodes
2015	Hulk and the Agents of S.M.A.S.H.	Star-Lord	Voice, episode: "Planet Monster"
2015–17	Girl Meets World	Eric Matthews	4 episodes
2015–19	Guardians of the Galaxy	Star-Lord, additional voices	Voice, main cast
2015–19	Teen Titans Go!	Kid Flash	Voice, 7 episodes Also writer (2 episodes)
2016	Transformers: Rescue Bots	Bumblebee	Voice, episode: "Uninvited Guest"
2016–17	Be Cool, Scooby-Doo!	Various	Voice, 3 episodes
2016–18	Future-Worm!	Lobster Boy	Voice, 3 episodes
2017–18	Stretch Armstrong and the Flex Fighters	Officer Reynolds	Voice, 7 episodes
2018	Hollywood Darlings	Will	Episode: "Y2K"
2018	Bunnicula	Captain Science Magic Love	Voice, episode: "Flunicula"
2019–21	DC Super Hero Girls	Lex Luthor, Aquaman	Voice, 7 episodes
2019–20	Big Hero 6: The Series	Ian / Hardlight	Voice, 2 episodes
2020	Spider-Man	Star-Lord, additional voices	Voice, episode: "Amazing Friends"
2022	Robot Chicken	Lance, Nightwing, Pointy-Haired Boss	Voice, episode: "May Cause a Squeakquel"
2023–24	The Legend of Vox Machina	Kashaw Vesh	Voice, 5 episodes
2026	Chibiverse	Ron Stoppable	Voice, episode: "Kiff Possible"

=== Video games ===
Year	Title	Role	Notes
2002	Spider-Man	Dr. Antower	Uncredited
2003	Batman: Rise of Sin Tzu	Additional voices	
2004	Medal of Honor: Pacific Assault	Willy Gaines	
2005	Jade Empire	Lu the Prodigy	
2005	Advent Rising	Gideon Wyeth, Councillor Sevan	
2005	Rogue Galaxy	Jaster Rogue	
2005	Teen Titans	Fang	
2005	Tony Hawk's American Wasteland	Hero / "Kensucky"	
2005	Chicken Little	Additional voices	
2005	Kingdom Hearts II	Seifer	
2006	Kim Possible: Legend of the Monkey's Eye	Ron Stoppable	
2006	Kim Possible: Whats the Switch?	Ron Stoppable	
2009	The Secret Saturdays: Beasts of the 5th Sun	Doyle Blackwell	
2010	Batman: The Brave and the Bold – The Videogame	Blue Beetle	
2013	Lego Marvel Super Heroes	Archangel, Nova, Rick Jones	
2014	Final Fantasy Explorers	Additional voices	
2019	Marvel Dimension of Heroes	Star-Lord	
2021	DC Super Hero Girls: Teen Power	Lex Luthor	

=== Web series ===
Year	Title	Role	Notes
2015–2017	Critical Role (campaign one)	Kashaw Vesh	Guest role; 8 episodes
2017–2018	Geek & Sundry Painters Guild	Himself	Host; 36 episodes
2019	Mini Primetime	Himself	Host; 8 episodes
2022–2023	I Hear Voices	Himself	Podcast co-host
2022–present	Pod Meets World	Himself	Podcast co-host
2024–present	Magical Rewind	Himself	Podcast co-host
