= Alexandra Barreto =

American actress

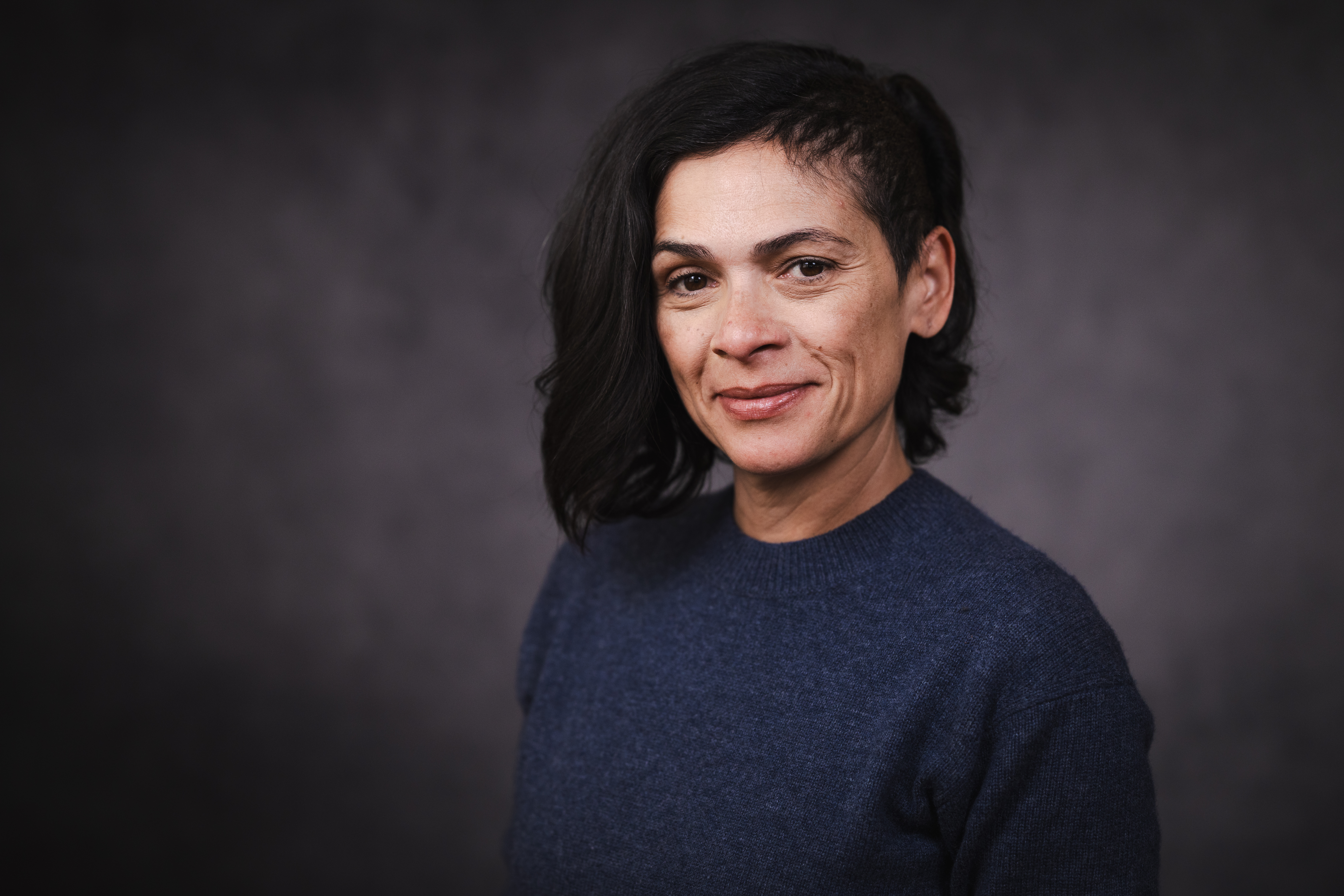
- Born: October 14, 1975 (age 51)
- Occupation: Actress
- Years active: 2000–present
- Spouse: Rider Strong (m. 2013)
- Children: 1

Alexandra Barreto is a Puerto Rican actress who starred in the 2006 television series Pepper Dennis with her husband Rider Strong and Rebecca Romijn and in the horror film Tooth and Nail, a part of the annual After Dark Horrorfest in 2007. She has also appeared in the recurring role of Ana Gutierrez on The Fosters.

== Career ==
Barreto has appeared in films such as Quitters, Blood Makes Me, Ghost Game, La Torcedura, Exposed, Beautiful, Woman on Fire, Farewell Collette, and Disney's The Kid. Her television appearances include 9 episodes of the TV police drama The District and was five episodes of American Family.

In 2008, Alexandra participated in a television commercial for the Barack Obama presidential campaign entitled "It Could Happen To You" along with Rider Strong and Shiloh Strong. The commercial won MoveOn.org's contest for funniest ad and aired on Comedy Central.

== Personal life ==
Barreto began dating actor Rider Strong after they met while filming the 2006 television series Pepper Dennis. They became engaged in December 2012, and married on October 20, 2013, in Oregon. The couple have one son, Indigo "Indy" Barreto Strong, born in December 2014.

== Filmography ==
=== Film ===
Year	Title	Role	Notes
2000	Disney's The Kid	Flight Attendant	
2002	Woman on Fire	Woman Reporter	
2003	Beautiful	Cass	Short
2003	Exposed	Carmen	
2004	La torcedura	Jose's Fiancee	Short
2004	Ghost Game	Dara	Video
2005	Blood Makes Noise	Connie	Short
2007	Tooth and Nail	Torino	
2009	Labor Pains	Pretty Woman	
2009	The Outside	Nurse	
2010	Career Day	Magda	Short
2010	VideoDome Rent-O-Rama	Emma	Short
2011	The Dungeon Master	Amber	Short
2011	Method	-	Short
2015	CSI: Immortality	Romina Gonzalez	TV movie
2017	The Lady Killers	Ali Batista	
2025	Descendent	Patricia	

=== Television ===
Year	Title	Role	Notes
2000	V.I.P.	Stacy	Episode: "Dangerous Beauty"
2000	Resurrection Blvd.	Carmen De La Cruz	Recurring Cast: Season 1
2002	Crossing Jordan	Anastasia	Episode: "Acts of Mercy"
2002	American Family	Young Berta	Recurring Cast: Season 1
2002	The Twilight Zone	Maria Hernandez	Episode: "Time Lapse"
2003–04	The District	Maria Rodriguez	Recurring Cast: Season 3–4
2004	Cold Case	Anna Vizcaino	Episode: "Discretion"
2005	Summerland	Isabel Luna	Recurring Cast: Season 2
2005	Sex, Love & Secrets	Victoria	Episode: "Molting"
2005	CSI: NY	Linda Cortez	Episode: "Trapped"
2006	Pepper Dennis	Blanca Martinez	Recurring Cast
2008	Pushing Daisies	Veronica Villanueva	Episode: "Frescorts"
2008	CSI: Crime Scene Investigation	Distraught Woman	Episode: "Art Imitates Life"
2009	Without a Trace	Giselle Fernandez	Episode: "Skeletons"
2009	Dark Blue	Marcella Vasquez	Episode: "Venice Kings"
2009	House	Cheryl	Episode: "Brave Heart"
2010	Castle	Annie Swift	Episode: "Last Call"
2010–11	Justified	Pilar	Recurring Cast: Season 1, Guest: Season 2
2011	NCIS	Navy Petty Officer Rena Oliver	Episode: "A Man Walks Into a Bar..."
2013	Californication	Sarah	Episode: "The Unforgiven"
2013–14	Parenthood	Karen Fillman	Recurring Cast: Season 5
2013–18	The Fosters	Ana Gutierrez	Recurring Cast
2015	NCIS: Los Angeles	LAPD Detective Jacqueline Rivera	Episode: "Fighting Shadows"
2016	Pure Genius	Amy Delgado	Episode: "Fire and Ice"
2017	Grey's Anatomy	Pam	Episode: "Civil War"
2018	The Romanoffs	Detective Gutierrez	Episode: "Bright and High Circle"
2018–21	Mayans M.C.	Antonia Pena	Recurring Cast: Season 1–3
2021–24	All American	Coach Montes	Recurring Cast: Season 3–4, Guest: Season 5–6
2022	Big Sky	Mrs. Cowley	Episode: "A Good Boy"
2023	The Rookie: Feds	Rebecca Laramie	Episode: "The Remora"
2025	Ballard	Janet Olivas	Recurring Cast
