= Rider Strong =

American actor (born 1979)

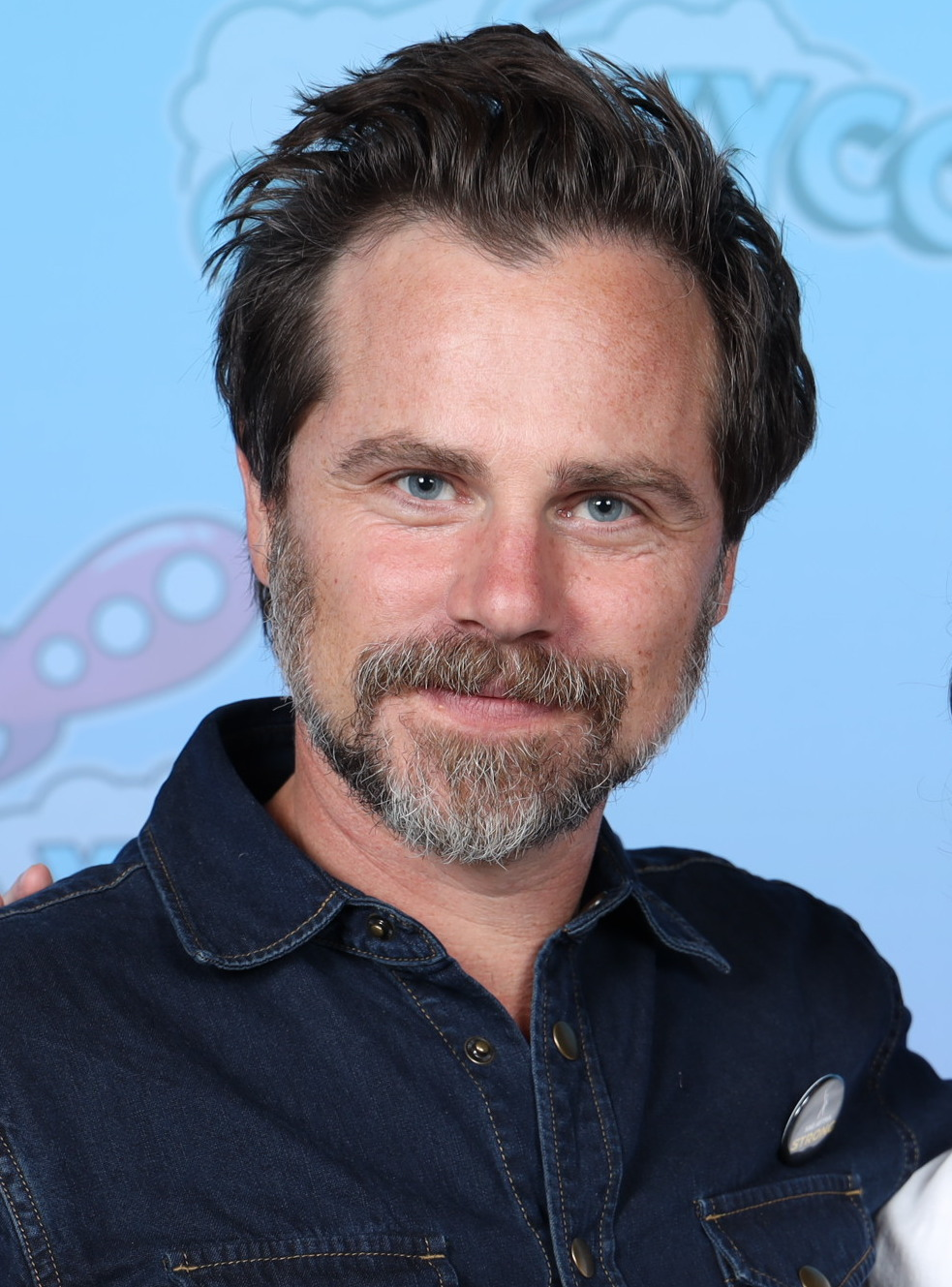
- Strong at GalaxyCon Raleigh in 2023
- Born: Rider King Strong; December 11, 1979 (age 46); San Francisco, California, U.S.
- Education: Occidental College; Columbia University (BA); Bennington College (MFA)
- Occupations: Actor; director
- Years active: 1990–present
- Spouse: Alexandra Barreto (m. 2013)
- Children: 1
- Relatives: Shiloh Strong (brother)

Rider King Strong (born December 11, 1979) is an American actor and director. He is best known for starring as Shawn Hunter on the ABC sitcom Boy Meets World (1993–2000), which he reprised in its sequel series Girl Meets World (2014–2017). He also headlined the film Cabin Fever (2002) and co-wrote and directed the independent film Irish Twins (2008) with his brother Shiloh. He provided the voices of Brick Flagg in Kim Possible (2002–2004) and Kim Possible Movie: So the Drama (2005), and Tom Lucitor in Star vs. the Forces of Evil (2015–2019). In 2015, Strong was honored with the Young Artist Former Child Star Lifetime Achievement Award.

== Early life ==
Strong was born in San Francisco, California, the second of two boys born to Lin (née Warner), a teacher and nutritionist, and King Arthur Strong, a firefighter, who are both originally from Pennsylvania. He has English and Irish ancestry. He graduated from Nonesuch School in Sebastopol, California in 1998. His elder brother is Shiloh Strong, an actor and photographer.

Strong attended morning classes at Occidental College while still filming for Boy Meets World, accumulating a year's worth of credit before the series ended. In 2004, Strong graduated magna cum laude from Columbia University as an English major. He completed his Master of Fine Arts in fiction and literature in June 2009 at Bennington College.

== Career ==
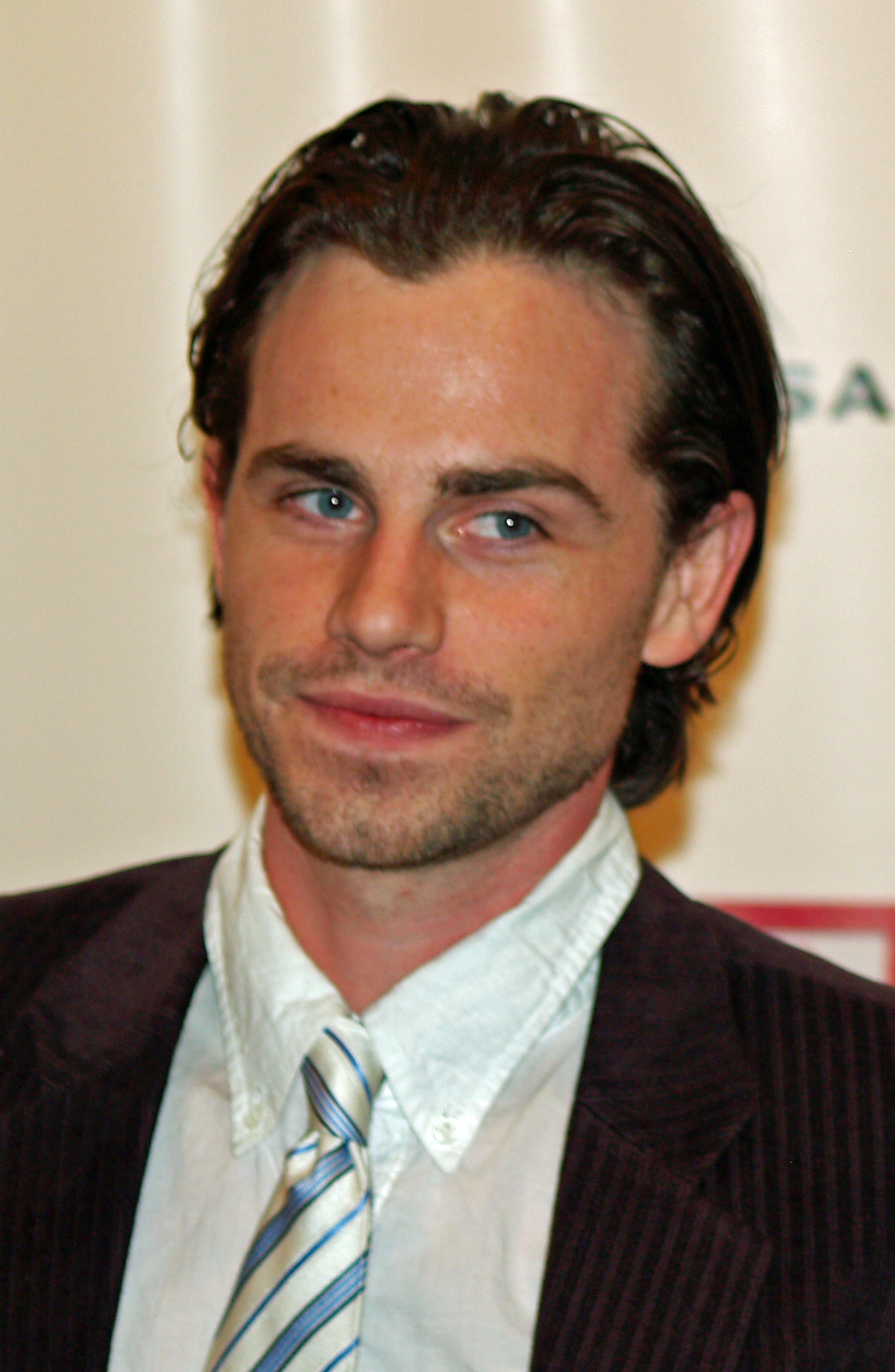
Strong at the Tribeca Film Festival in 2008.

Strong began his acting career at the age of nine, when he starred as Gavroche in the San Francisco production of Les Misérables, alongside Larisa Oleynik as Young Cosette. After the stage production, he appeared in small screen roles on television.

In 1992, Strong received his first regular television series role as Adam MacGuire on Julie. When the series was canceled, Strong made his debut on film, in 1993, as Amy Irving's son in Benefit of the Doubt. It was not until he was chosen for the role of Shawn Hunter in the ABC series Boy Meets World that he received widespread recognition. During the seven-year run, he was nominated twice for the Young Artist Award and nominated once for The Hollywood Reporter YoungStar Award. He found it difficult coping with his newfound fame, citing at least one breakdown at 15 when he was on a "Sail With the Stars" charity cruise. However, in a later interview, Strong also stated that he was inconsiderate with his power, having previously set up weekly six hour roundtrip commutes back to Sonoma with his mother and brother.

Strong permanently moved to Los Angeles at 16 and later attended morning classes at Occidental College. After Boy Meets World ended in 2000, he moved to New York to attend Columbia University. At that time, actors Joseph Gordon-Levitt, Julia Stiles, and Anna Paquin were all registered students at the university. Strong took one semester off to star as Paul in the indie horror film Cabin Fever (2002), directed by Eli Roth. He took another semester off to star in a Broadway production of The Graduate, opposite Jerry Hall as Mrs. Robinson.

In 2006, Strong returned to television for a regular series role in Pepper Dennis on The WB. The show was short-lived and was not chosen as one of the transferring shows to The CW. That same year, Strong recorded a reading for the audio version of the Anthony Kiedis biography Scar Tissue. He had a brief cameo appearance in 2009's Cabin Fever 2: Spring Fever, the sequel to Cabin Fever.

Along with his brother Shiloh, Strong wrote and directed the short film Irish Twins, which premiered at the 2008 Tribeca Film Festival. It went on to win both the Jury Award and Audience Award at the Woods Hole Film Festival, a Special Jury Prize in the Action/Cut Short Film Competition and Best First-Time Director at DC Shorts. Speaking to Pure Movies in 2010, he expressed that he wanted to expand his writing and directing career: "Acting is always there and I enjoy it but it's kind of got a little unfulfilling lately. You know, I'm in the low-budget horror world. ... I have a whole lot of other stuff I want to do."

In 2010, Strong starred in the science fiction-thriller film Darkening Sky alongside Ezra Buzzington, Charley Rossman, Sally Berman, Daniel Kirschner, and LaShan Anderson under the direction of Victor Bornia. He also appeared in Your Lucky Day which premiered at the Seattle International Film Festival that same year.

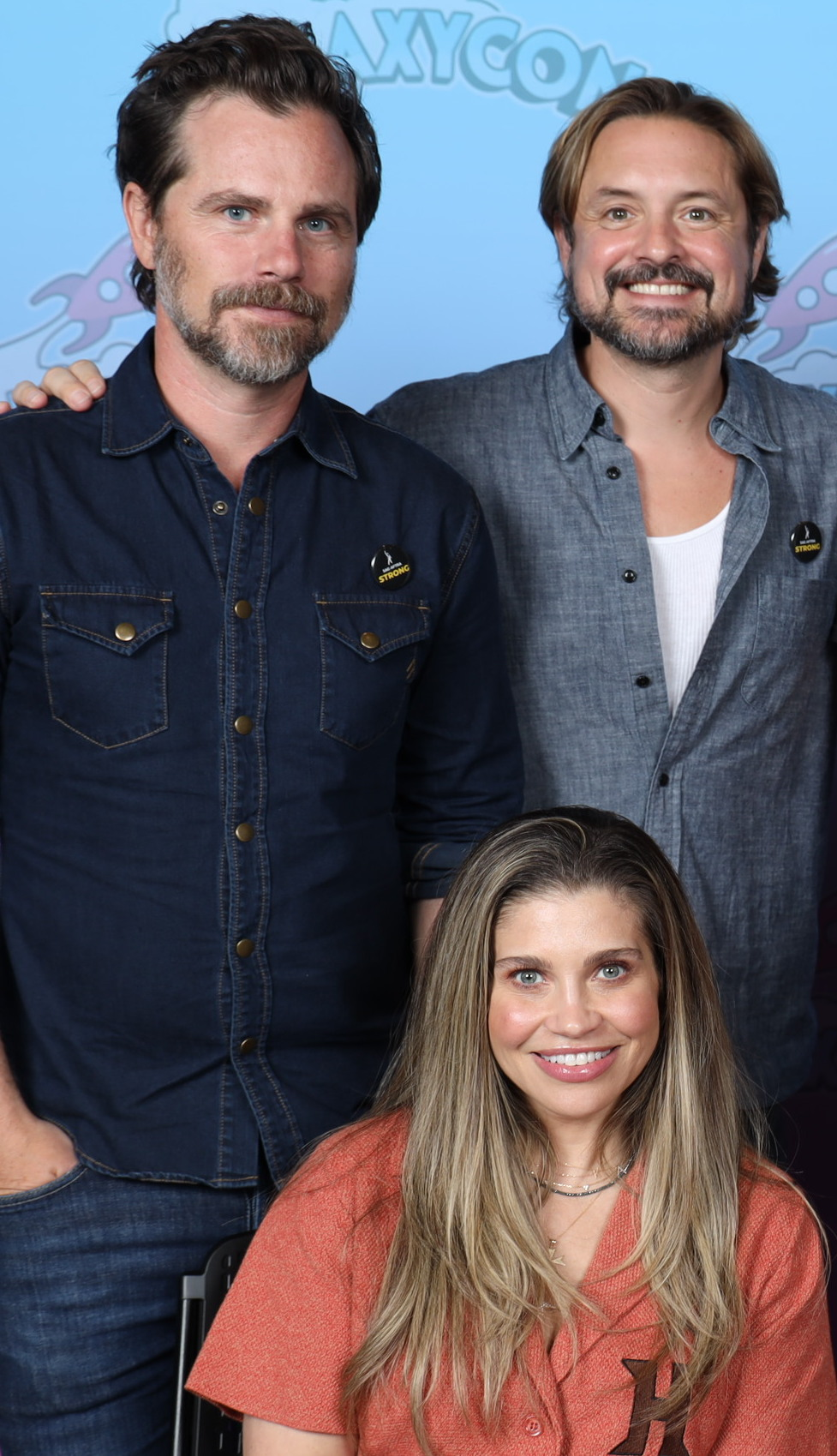
Rider along with former co-stars and podcast co-hosts, Will Friedle and Danielle Fishel in 2023.

In late 2012, Strong declined an offer to reprise his role as Shawn Hunter in the spinoff, Girl Meets World. However, during production of the pilot in March 2013, Strong along with other cast members, who were also unconfirmed to return, appeared on the set sparking rumors of a cameo or return to the new series. Creator Michael Jacobs stated "I think there's more than a chance, I think there's a strong chance" when commenting on Strong and other original series cast members returning. Other current cast members commented on Strong's return indicating that his return might be a secret not ready to be revealed. In June 2013, a Boy Meets World reunion was held with Strong attending along with many of his former cast members. On March 19, 2014, it was confirmed that Strong would reprise his role as Shawn Hunter, the first being a holiday-themed episode along with former cast members Betsy Randle and William Russ. He managed to leverage his reprisal of Shawn on the condition that he and his brother would get to direct a few episodes.

In March 2012, Strong, Julia Pistell, and Tod Goldberg, started Literary Disco, a podcast about books and writing. In September 2019, Strong debuted Never Ever Land, his play inspired by the 1993 child sexual abuse accusations against Michael Jackson, in Los Angeles.

Since 2022, Strong has hosted the Boy Meets World rewatch podcast Pod Meets World with Danielle Fishel and Will Friedle.

== Personal life ==
Strong began dating actress Alexandra Barreto after they met while filming the 2006 television series Pepper Dennis. They became engaged in December 2012, and married on October 20, 2013, in Oregon. The couple have one son, Indigo "Indy" Barreto Strong, born in December 2014.

In April 2008, Strong, along with Barreto and his brother Shiloh, co-created a 30-second television ad in support of Democratic presidential candidate Barack Obama titled, "It Could Happen to You". The ad, submitted to MoveOn, became one of 15 finalists from a pool of over 1,100 submitted ads, and was chosen as the funniest ad in May 2008. In August, MoveOn raised $200,000 to air the ad on MTV and Comedy Central; it was the first political commercial to ever appear on Comedy Central. In early 2009, Strong narrated the audiobook of The Obama Revolution by Alan Kennedy-Shaffer. In 2018 and 2019, he was seen attending the Women's March, March for Public Education in Los Angeles, and March for Our Lives.

== Filmography ==
Film
Year	Title	Role	Notes
1993	Benefit of the Doubt	Pete Braswell	
1994	Summertime Switch	Frederick Egan III	
1998	My Giant	Justin Allen	
1999	The Pact	Lenny Dalton	
2001	Buck Naked Arson	Willy Barnes	
2001	The Secret Pact	Lenny B. Dalton	
2002	Cabin Fever	Paul	
2004	Death Valley	Daniel	
2005	Paradise, Texas	Charlie	
2007	Cosmic Radio	Justin	
2007	Borderland	Phil	
2007	Tooth and Nail	Ford	
2008	Spy School	Mr. Randall	
2008	Irish Twins	Michael Sullivan	Short film
2008	Pulse 3	Adam	Video
2009	H_{2}O Extreme	Greg	
2009	Cabin Fever 2: Spring Fever	Paul	
2010	Darkening Sky	Eric Rainer	
2010	Ruff Love	George	Short film
2010	The Penthouse	Kieran	
2010	Your Lucky Day	Young Man	Short film
2011	Lone	Jason Sumner	Short film
2011	Walter Don't Dance	Thad	Short film
2015	Too Late	Matthew	

Television
Year	Title	Role	Notes
1991	Long Road Home	Benjy Robertson	Television film
1991	Going Places	David	Episode: "The Camping Show"
1992	Empty Nest	Philip Logan	Episode: "Why Do Fools Fall in Love?"
1992	Evening Shade	Jimmy	Episode: "The Diary of Molly Newton"
1992	Home Improvement	Danny	Episode: "Haunting of Taylor House"
1992	Julie	Adam McGuire	Main Role
1993	Nurses	Max Kaplan	Episode: "The Devil and the Deep Blue Sea"
1993	Time Trax	William Peterman	Episode: "The Prodigy"
1993	The Last Hit	Jimmy Dunne	Television film
1993–2000	Boy Meets World	Shawn Hunter	Main role
1994	Summertime Switch	Frederick Egan III	Television film
1996	Maybe This Time	Shawn Hunter	Episode: "Acting Out"
1996	Party of Five	Byron	2 episodes
1997	Oddville, MTV		1 episode
1998	Hercules	Pollux	Voice, episode: "Hercules and the Trojan War"
1998	Invasion America	Jim Bailey	Voice, main role
1999	The Practice	Gary Armbrust	2 episodes
1999	Batman Beyond	Bobby Vance	Voice, episode: "Lost Soul"
1999–2000	Roughnecks: Starship Troopers Chronicles	Pvt. Carl Jenkins	Voice, main role
2002	Law & Order: Criminal Intent	Ethan Edwards	Episode: "The Pilgrim"
2002–04	Kim Possible	Brick Flagg	Voice, 5 episodes
2005	Kim Possible Movie: So the Drama	Brick Flagg	Voice, television film
2006	Crumbs	Dennis	Episode: "Six Feet Blunder"
2006	Pepper Dennis	Chick Dirka	Main role
2006	Veronica Mars	Rafe	Episode: "My Big Fat Greek Rush Week"
2007	Bones	Gregg Liscombe	Episode: "Mummy in the Maze"
2009	Castle	Rocco Jones	Episode: "The Fifth Bullet"
2010	100 Questions	Alan	Episode: "Wayne?"
2012	Paulilu Mixtape	Sam Paxton	Episode: "Hooker Lawyer"
2014	Chosen	Ross	Episode: "Redemption"
2014–17	Girl Meets World	Shawn Hunter	Recurring role; also directed 18 episodes
2015–19	Star vs. the Forces of Evil	Tom Lucitor	Voice, recurring role
2017–18	Mighty Magiswords	Familiar, Glori's Monster, Bite Beasts	Voice, 6 episodes
2025	Love, Death & Robots	Man #1	Episode: "The Screaming of the Tyrannosaur"

== Awards and nominations ==
Year	Award	Category	Production	Result
1994	Young Artist Award	Best Youth Comedian	Boy Meets World	Nominated
1997	Young Artist Award	Best Performance in a TV Comedy – Supporting Young Actor	Boy Meets World	Nominated
1999	Teen Choice Awards	Choice TV Sidekick	Boy Meets World	Nominated
2000	Nickelodeon Kids' Choice Awards	Favorite Television Friends	Boy Meets World	Won
2007	Fright Meter Awards	Best Supporting Actor	Borderland	Nominated
2008	Washington DC Shorts Film Festival	Best First Time Filmmaker	Irish Twins	Nominated
2008	Tribeca Film Festival	Best Narrative Short	Irish Twins	Nominated
2011	Chicago International Film Festival	Best Short Film	Method	Nominated
2011	Tribeca Film Festival	Best Narrative Short	The Dungeon Master	Nominated
2011	Tribeca Film Festival	Best Short Film	The Dungeon Master	Won
2015	Young Artist Awards	Former Child Star Lifetime Achievement Award	Himself	Won
