= Tooth and Nail (film) =

- Promotional film poster
- Directed by: Mark Young
- Written by: Mark Young
- Produced by: Jonathan Sachar; Patrick Durham
- Starring: Rachel Miner; Rider Strong; Michael Kelly; Robert Carradine; Vinnie Jones; Michael Madsen
- Cinematography: Gregg Easterbrook
- Edited by: Mark Young
- Music by: Elia Cmiral
- Distributed by: After Dark Films (theatrical)
- Release date: October 16, 2007 (Screamfest Film Festival)
- Running time: 94 minutes
- Country: United States
- Language: English

Tooth and Nail is a 2007 horror film written, directed and edited by Mark Young, about a group of people in a post-apocalyptic world who must fight to survive against a band of vicious cannibals.

== Plot ==
After an apocalypse, mankind has depleted all fossil fuel reserves, and civilization has collapsed. A group of survivors called "Foragers" take cover in an abandoned hospital where the group attempt to rebuild civilization. After saving a young girl from being murdered and eaten by a gang of cannibals called "Rovers", the Foragers find themselves on the run from the cannibals, who stalk the survivors and brutally kill them off one-by-one as the Foragers begin to fight back, causing a chaotic battle of blood and mayhem.

== Cast ==
- Rachel Miner as "Neon"
- Nicole DuPort as Dakota
- Rider Strong as Ford
- Michael Kelly as "Viper"
- Robert Carradine as Darwin
- Michael Madsen as "Jackal"
- Vinnie Jones as "Mongrel"
- Alexandra Barreto as Torino
- Emily Catherine Young as Nova
- Beverly Hynds as Victoria
- Patrick Durham as Shepherd
- Jonathan Sachar as Wolf
- Garrett Ching as "Pug"
- Kevin E. Scott as Max

== Release ==
This film was released in theaters as part of After Dark Film's Horrorfest, which ran November 9–18, 2007.
