= Everything You Want (film) =

2005 American TV movie

- Movie poster
- Based on: play by Kevin Lawrence King; Natalie Prado
- Screenplay by: Steven A. Lee
- Directed by: Ryan Little
- Starring: Shiri Appleby; Nick Zano; Alexandra Holden; Orlando Seale; Will Friedle
- Theme music composer: J Bateman
- Country of origin: United States
- Original language: English

Production
- Producer: Brian Brough
- Cinematography: Geno Salvatori
- Editor: Ethan Vincent
- Running time: 93 minutes

Original release
- Network: ABC Family
- Release: April 17, 2005

Everything You Want is a 2005 American romantic-comedy television film starring Shiri Appleby and Nick Zano. The film premiered on ABC Family on April 17, 2005.

== Plot ==
Abby Morrison has lived a sheltered life. She has had an imaginary boyfriend named Sy since she was five. Abby is an artist with a passion to paint and usually makes paintings of Sy and visions what he looks like.

Abby agrees to tutor her roommate's cynical cousin Quinn and finds herself attracted to him. Quinn becomes jealous that she has a boyfriend, not knowing that Sy does not exist. However, Abby ignores the attraction, in order to focus on Sy. Abby's parents invite Quinn for Thanksgiving dinner, where her mother mentions Abby's imaginary friend, which makes Quinn think that she made all of it up as an obstacle for their relationship. He stops meeting with her, but he gradually became miserable.

Abby also realizes that she should get rid of Sy and face reality. She asks Sy to leave for good and for the first time she joins her parents in their weird work (decorating the tombstones they made for themselves). Quinn, after seeking advice from his roommate and cousin, searches for Abby and while looking for her in a club he once took her to, he finds a portrait of himself painted by Abby and notices an image in the background of Abby at the rink. He finds her there and kisses her.

== Cast ==
- Shiri Appleby - Abby Morrison
- Nick Zano - Quinn Andrews
- Alexandra Holden - Jessica Lindstrom
- Orlando Seale - Sy
- Will Friedle - Calvin Dillwaller
- Edie McClurg - Mary Louise Morrison
- Scott Wilkinson - George Morrison
- K. C. Clyde - Ryan Sanders
