= Shiloh Strong =

Actor, producer, screenwriter, director

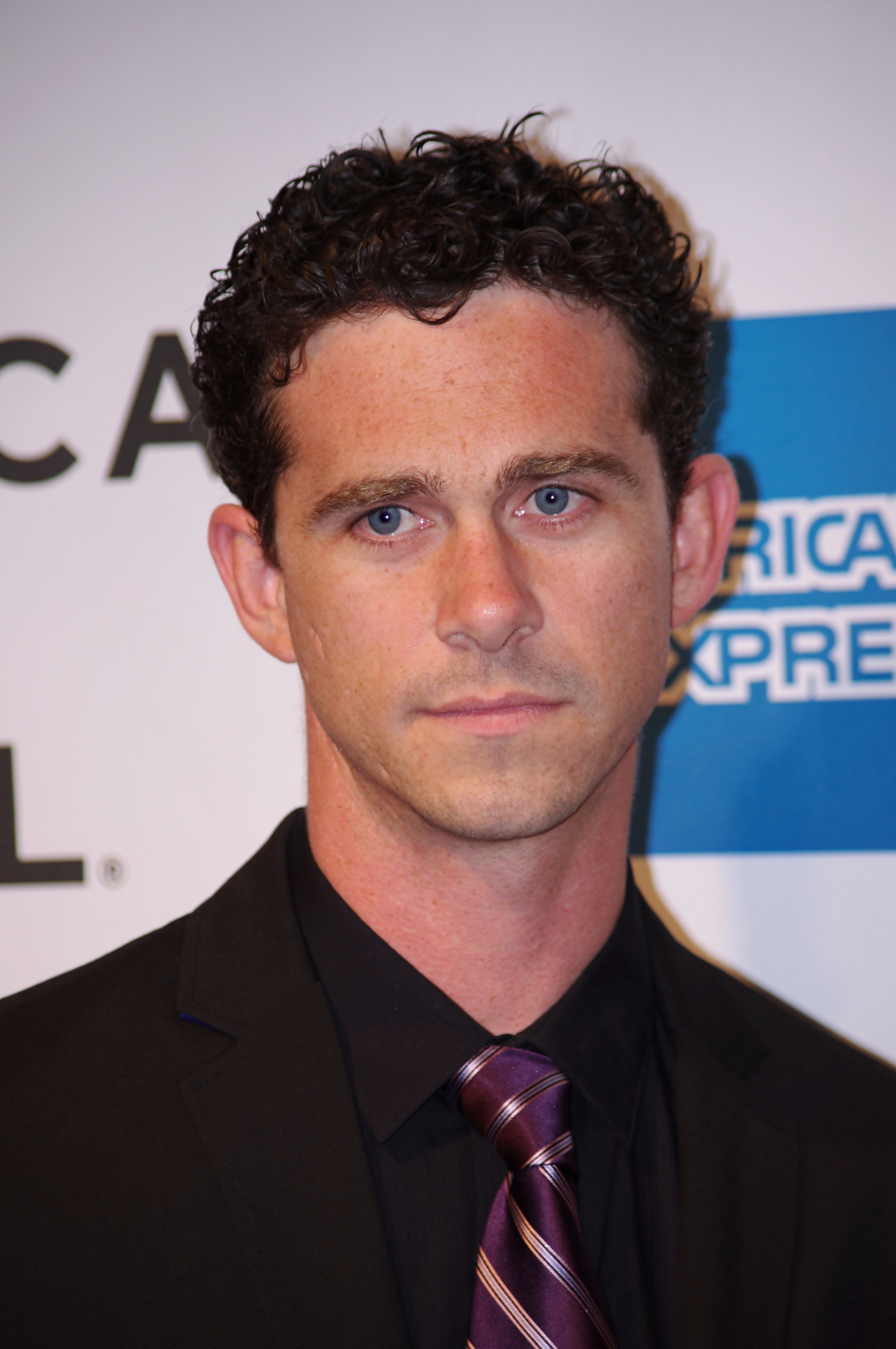
- Strong at the 2011 Tribeca Film Festival
- Occupations: Actor, photographer, screenwriter, director
- Years active: 1992–present
- Relatives: Rider Strong (brother)

Shiloh Strong is an American actor, screenwriter, photographer, and film director whose roles include Zelos Wilder from Tales of Symphonia, Karl Scott from Dinotopia, and Grant from Buck Naked Arson.

At the age of 16, Shiloh won a Dramalogue Award for writing the play Shades of Blue. He wrote, directed and starred in the award-winning short film Irish Twins along with his brother, Rider Strong. The film premiered at the 2008 Tribeca Film Festival.

In 2008, Shiloh Strong helped create a television commercial for Barack Obama's presidential campaign called "It Could Happen To You". He appeared in the commercial with Alexandra Barreto and his brother Rider Strong. The commercial won Moveon.org's contest for funniest commercial and aired on Comedy Central.

In 2015, Shiloh started working on Girl Meets World, co-directing episodes with his brother Rider.

== Filmography ==
List of film and television credits
Year	Title	Role	Notes
1993	Spies	Harry Prescott	TV movie
1993	House of Cards	Michael Matthews	
1993–1995	The Mommies	Adam Larson	28 episodes
1995	Maybe This Time	Hunter	Episode: "Maybe This Time"
1996	Foxfire	Steve	
2000	3rd Rock from the Sun	Student No. 2	2 episodes
2001	Buck Naked Arson	Grant	
2002	Cabin Fever	Rider's Brother	
2002–2003	Dinotopia	David Scott	11 episodes
2003	Monk	T.J.	Episode: "Mr. Monk Goes to Mexico"
2004	24	Lennox	Episode: "Day 3: 7:00 a.m. – 8:00 a.m."
2004	Tales of Symphonia	Zelos Wilder	Video game
2005	Bluff Point	Boyfriend	
2006	CSI: Crime Scene Investigation	Hayden Bradford	Episode: "Werewolves"
2007	Nina & the Mystery of the Secret Room	Jeff	
2008	Irish Twins	Seamus Sullivan	

=== As a director ===
Girl Meets World

- "Girl Meets the Secret of Life" co-directed with Rider Strong – Season 2
- "Girl Meets Mr. Squirrels" co-directed with Rider Strong – Season 2
- "Girl Meets Rules" co-directed with Rider Strong – Season 2
- "Girl Meets Mr. Squirrels Goes to Washington" co-directed with Rider Strong – Season 2
- "Girl Meets Yearbook" co-directed with Rider Strong – Season 2
- "Girl Meets Creativity" co-directed with Rider Strong – Season 2
- "Girl Meets Texas: Part 1" co-directed with Rider Strong – Season 2
- "Girl Meets Texas: Part 2" co-directed with Rider Strong – Season 2
- "Girl Meets STEM" co-directed with Rider Strong – Season 2
- "Girl Meets Money" co-directed with Rider Strong – Season 2
- "Girl Meets Jexica" co-directed with Rider Strong – Season 3
- "Girl Meets Permanent Record" co-directed with Rider Strong – Season 3
- "Girl Meets Ski Lodge: Part 1" co-directed with Rider Strong – Season 3
- "Girl Meets Ski Lodge: Part 2" co-directed with Rider Strong – Season 3
- "Girl Meets the Great Lady of New York" co-directed with Rider Strong – Season 3
