= My Date with the President's Daughter =

- VHS cover
- Written by: William Robertson; Alex Zamm
- Directed by: Alex Zamm
- Starring: Dabney Coleman; Will Friedle; Elisabeth Harnois; Mimi Kuzyk; Wanda Cannon; Jay Thomas
- Theme music composer: Chris Hajian
- Country of origin: United States
- Original language: English

Production
- Producer: Kevin Inch
- Cinematography: Albert J. Dunk
- Editor: Jimmy Hill
- Running time: 93 minutes
- Production companies: Karz Entertainment; Walt Disney Television

Original release
- Network: ABC
- Release: April 19, 1998

My Date with the President's Daughter is a 1998 American made-for-television romantic comedy film produced by Walt Disney Television and premiered as part of ABC's revival of The Wonderful World of Disney. The film was directed by Alex Zamm and stars Dabney Coleman, Will Friedle, and Elisabeth Harnois. It was shot in various locations around Toronto, Ontario, Canada.

My Date with President's Daughter premiered on April 19, 1998. The film earned a small cult following among viewers who saw the original broadcast as well as its multiple reruns on the Disney Channel.

== Plot ==
Duncan Fletcher is an average teenager living in suburban Washington, D.C. In search of a date to his school's spring dance due to a bet he makes with his friends, Curtis and Arthur, he meets a girl named Hallie at the mall, whom he does not recognize as the daughter of the President of the United States, George Richmond. Hallie is in the mall hiding from the Secret Service after sneaking off during her father's reelection campaign event. Duncan asks Hallie to the dance and she accepts, giving Duncan an address which he does not realize is the location of the White House.

The president initially refuses to let Hallie go out on the date due to a fundraiser that night, but he reluctantly complies after a brief discussion with his wife and first lady, Carol Richmond. Meanwhile, Duncan's family prepares to throw a house party for his father's company. As Duncan tells his family about his date, he asks his father Charles if he could borrow the company car, a red BMW 525i. His father declines, but Duncan takes the car anyway and goes to Hallie's to pick her up, arriving at the White House to his astonishment. Hallie has Duncan meet her father, who informs Duncan that there are limitations on where they can and cannot go, and that the Secret Service will accompany the two the entire time. Hallie insists she and Duncan are only going to dinner and a movie, but this turns out to be a cover so she and Duncan can sneak away from the Secret Service at a movie theater. Once the agents realize that they have lost Hallie and Duncan, the president is notified and he orders for Duncan's family to be brought to the fundraiser.

Having successfully shaken off the agents, Hallie and Duncan stop at a store called F/X to get some new clothes to wear on their date. After trying on multiple outfits, Hallie emerges from the dressing room in a pink velour mini-dress. She then picks an expensive leather jacket for Duncan. However, on the way to the dance, Hallie says she wants to briefly check out Club Alien, a newly opened night club. Duncan makes a phone call to his friends to tell them he’s not just bringing any date, but the President’s daughter herself, to the dance. Duncan insists to them he isn’t lying and increases the money for the bet.

During the house party at the Fletchers' residence, Mr. Fletcher realizes the company car is missing and tries to hide this from his boss, Herb. The family is then visited by the Secret Service, who inform them that Duncan has run away with the president's daughter and orders them to see the president at the fundraiser. The agents also inform them that Duncan and Hallie were last seen driving a red BMW, which Herb overhears and chastises Charles for.

While Hallie drives to Club Alien in Duncan's vehicle, they stop at a red light and encounter trouble with a truck of rednecks who make crass comments at Hallie, much to her annoyance. Hallie warns the men to back off, as she believes that Duncan would defend her from them, which prompts one of the men to threaten Duncan. In a panic, Duncan urges Hallie to run the red light, and she accidentally treads over the man's foot while doing so.

The pair encounter many more obstacles through the night, including a run-in at a biker bar and the theft of Mr. Fletcher's car by a crazed couple—that prevent them from getting to the dance and Duncan winning his bet. Mr. Fletcher and President Richmond team up to search for the pair through the city. The two men get arrested for a traffic violation when a traffic cop fails to recognize the President, but they are later released to their families. Hallie learns about the bet Duncan made and angrily ditches him for Duncan's nemesis, Steve Ellinger. At Steve's house, Steve begins making unwanted advances on an uncomfortable Hallie. Duncan finds Steve's house, and after a fight, manages to rescue Hallie. Before escaping with Duncan, Hallie wrecks Steve's motorcycle for payback. Upon learning she cannot judge very handsome men like Steve by their charming looks, Hallie admits to Duncan that she should have listened to him in the beginning. After apologizing to each other, the couple shares a kiss on the Lincoln Memorial steps as the sun rises. Hallie returns home safely, but both she and Duncan realize they might have feelings for each other. Back at the White House, Hallie expresses her guiltiness to her parents for making a lot of trouble the other night, but they both forgive her.

Though he did not make it to the dance and thus lost the bet, Duncan feels satisfied with the outcome and does not care if his friends doubt his account of the events. Duncan and Mr. Fletcher retrieve the company car in the impound and Mr. Fletcher was threatening to punish Duncan but he decides not to. They both decide to spend more time together after Mr. Fletcher cooled off. Mr. Fletcher goes easy on his son until he learns that Duncan used his credit card to pay for the outfits from F/X. President Richmond arrives at Duncan's school to thank him for Hallie's date and allows Duncan to continue seeing his daughter. As a result, Duncan's reputation at school improves from his average status, and Duncan's father is promoted at work after his boss is allowed to meet the President and play golf with him. Hallie and Duncan are able to pursue a real relationship and happily go on a second date, flanked by the Secret Service SUVs and a helicopter.

== Cast ==
- Dabney Coleman as President George Richmond
- Will Friedle as Duncan Fletcher
- Elisabeth Harnois as Hallie Richmond
- Mimi Kuzyk as First Lady Carol Richmond
- Wanda Cannon as Rita Fletcher
- Jay Thomas as Charles Fletcher
- Oliver Becker as Cell Guard
- David Blacker as redneck #1
- Marium Carvell as Duncan's Teacher
- Joel Gordon as Curtis
- Paulo Costanzo as Arthur
- Howard Jerome as Larry
- Neil Crone as Agent Kelly
- Nicole de Boer as Bonnie
- Diane Douglass as Phillis
- Chantal Leblanc-Everett as Tracy Fletcher
- Dan Lett as Agent McKible
- Jim Millington as Herb Witherspoon
- Frank Moore as Dan Thornhill
- Dave Nichols as Agent Schneider
- Grant Nickalls as Steve Ellinger
- Karl Pruner as Paul Klondike
- Ron Reagan as Guard
- Adam Reid as Reid Bosshardt
- Garry Robbins as biker #1
- Alison Sealy-Smith as protester woman
- Sandi Stahlbrand as reporter
- Rob Stefaniuk as Otto
- Scott Wickware as Duncan's mother's friend
- Gordon Michael Woolvett as Clyde
- Matt Birman as Secret Service Agent
- Patrick Gallagher as Secret Service Agent
- Polly Shannon as cashier

== Soundtrack ==
The film featured the song "My Date with the President's Daughter" by the band the Presidents of the United States of America, describing events similar to those in the plot. The film also features "Da Jodel-Rudel" performed by Werner Bruegemann and the jazz song "Moonlight Magic" performed by Alan Moorhouse.

== Accolades ==
In 1999, Alex Zamm and William Robertson were nominated for a Writers Guild of America Award in the category of Children’s Script.
