= J-SH04 =

Mobile phone model

SHARP J-SH04
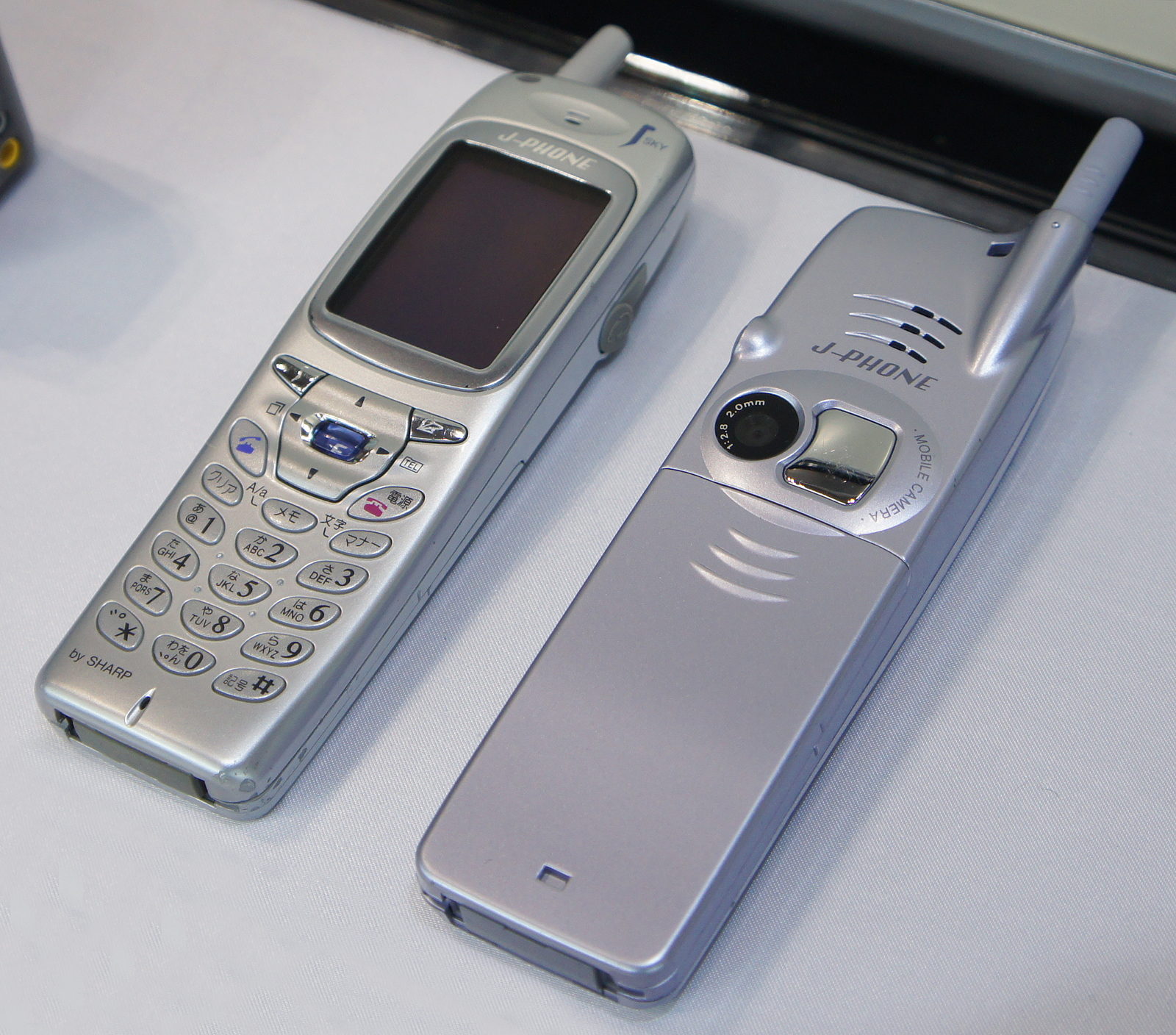
- Manufacturer: Sharp
- Availability by region: 1 November 2000
- Predecessor: J-SH03
- Successor: J-SH05
- Dimensions: 122×32×13 mm (4.80×1.26×0.51 in)
- Rear camera: 110,000-pixels CMOS camera
- Display: 256-color display

The J-SH04 was a mobile phone made by Sharp Corporation and released by J-Phone (now SoftBank Mobile). It was only available in Japan, and was released in November 2000. It was Japan's second phone with a built-in, back-facing camera. It has a 1/7 inch format, 110,000 pixel CMOS image sensor and a 256 color display, both manufactured by Sharp. The CMOS sensor used only 20% of the power of Sharp’s similarly sized CCD sensor. The phone weighed 74g, and its dimensions were 127 × 39 × 17 mm. It was succeeded by the J-SH05 flip phone, which was released just one month later. It is also considered to be one of the first phones with polyphonic ringtones.

While the J-SH04 popularized the concept of a camera phone (branded as Sha-Mail) and was the world's first fully integrated camera and telephone over a cellular mobile network, it had a number of predecessors. In December 1997, Kyocera released the VP-110, which was a PCMCIA videophone adapter with an 80,000-pixel CCD camera that swiveled 210° and attached to the DataScope DS-110 and DS-320 mobile phones. Kyocera released the first commercial mobile camera-phone in September 1999, the VP-210 Visual Phone which had a front-facing 110,000-pixel CMOS camera enabling both video calling and sending photos over the air. The VP-210 could send its still images as mail attachments or send video at 2 frames per second over a PHS network. In contrast, the J-SH04's camera on the back of the phone was designed to take photos facing away from the user, which was a more popular way to use digital cameras at the time than video calling and selfie photos. The SH04 was the transformational moment for the camera phone.

Samsung's SCH-V200 phone equipped with a VGA camera was released in South Korea several months before the J-SH04. The Samsung SCH-V200's camera was inside the same case as the phone and used the same battery and memory, but it was not integrated with the phone function. It could not convey an image "at a distance," which some regard as part of the definition of a "camera phone." Instead, photos taken by the SCH-V200 had to be transferred to a PC in order to be sent over a network.
