= Isaac (camera phone) =

Isaac was a personal digital assistant (PDA) for people with intellectual disabilities which enabled them to communicate using pictures. It is believed to be the earliest camera phone and Wireless photo system, since it was used to capture and transfer digital photos to an image server at a support center beginning in 1994. Isaac combined a personal digital assistant, a digital camera, a Global Positioning System (GPS) receiver, and mobile phone modems for voice and data. Named in honor of Isaac Newton, the system was conceived by Professor Bodil Jönsson in 1993 and constructed in 1994 by Jönsson, Lars Philipson, Arne Svensk, and their colleagues in the Center for Rehabilitation Engineering (Certec) at Lund University in Sweden. By the end of 1994, Certec had built and deployed 25 Isaac units, which transmitted digital photos over standard cellular networks to an image server at a support center.

== Isaac camera phone technology ==
Isaac users carried a small handheld unit tethered to a shoulder bag which contained a single board computer and other electronics. The handheld unit was a Sharp touchscreen PDA (personal digital assistant) with a case that had been modified to include a miniature video camera along with a microphone and a speaker. The camera used a 1/3-inch format Sony Charge-coupled device (CCD) image sensor which was digitized to produce an image with 256 x 256 pixels. A picture was taken when a viewer window on the PDA screen was touched. It could be immediately transmitted to the support center or stored and downloaded at a later time. The handheld unit connected to the shoulder bag, which included an image frame memory, two cellular modems for voice and data, a GPS receiver, an Intel 80186 processor, 1 Megabyte of Random-access Memory (RAM), and 256 Kilobytes of flash memory. The strap for the shoulder bag included antennas for the two cellular modems and the GPS receiver. The power management unit included a rechargeable Nickel–metal hydride (NiMH) battery along with an accelerometer, which detected when the shoulder bag was stationary so the system could be put into sleep mode. The handheld unit also included an “off” control for the GPS receiver, which provided privacy when the user did not want to be tracked.

The touchscreen on the handheld unit displayed simple pictures and symbols which were personalized for individual users. Users could make phone calls by touching one of the icons on the screen depicting the face of the person to be called. They could take pictures, using Isaac's digital camera, to document their day. They could also send their pictures to the support center, to get help with questions or concerns about things they encountered during their travels. The GPS receiver enabled both the user and the support center to understand their location.

== Isaac image server ==
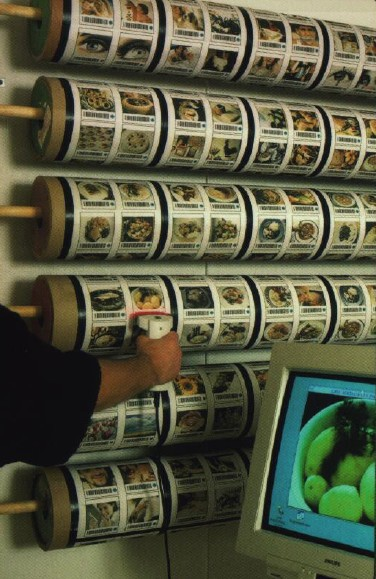

The Isaac system included an image server at a support center, built using a Microsoft Windows PC, which communicated with the portable Isaac user devices and stored the camera phone images and data as it was wirelessly transmitted from the devices. Incoming photos were marked with metadata, including the name of the user and the date / time the image was captured, and stored in a database. The stored images could later be searched, and selected images could be printed and added to rollers in the Isaac Picture Bank, or to a photo album or diary.

At the support center, a Geographical Information System (GIS) produced an electronic map showing the position of each user. In addition to the street address, it could provide a graphic overlay showing the locations of nearby bus stops and public buildings. The support center included personal planning and time management software, to help schedule activities for each of the users. For example, the support center could set an alarm on a user's handheld device to remind the user of their bus departure time. On the Isaac screen, activities appeared as pictograms positioned relative to a vertical timeline.

== Development and deployment of the Isaac system ==
Isaac was conceived by Physicist Bodil Jönsson, who believed that people with intellectual disabilities who were nonverbal could communicate if they were able to use the language of pictures. Work began in October 1993 at Certec, which partnered with several group homes for adults with cognitive dysfunctions in Lund, Sweden. The goal was to enable disabled individuals to live more independently, by making it easier for them to communicate.

By the end of 1994, CERTEC had built and deployed 25 Isaac units, which transmitted voice, photos, and GPS data to the image server at a support center. The Isaac image server stored each user's photos, which could then be searched and printed. The printed photos, which were bar coded to allow the corresponding digital images to be retrieved at a later date, were mounted on rolls or in albums which could be viewed by the users.

Isaac was featured in the January 1998 episode of Scientific American Frontiers on PBS, hosted by Alan Alda. Mr. Alda first tried talking with one of Isaac's users and then realized that he could better communicate with him by pointing to some of the pictures that the user had taken.

After creating the Isaac system, the research group at CERTEC continued to study how to use digital pictures to help people with disabilities communicate. Their work on Isaac demonstrated that “taking pictures for free” using a camera phone led to a variety of different uses for these pictures. Some Isaac users quickly amassed thousands of pictures in their collections.

In 1998, Jönsson, Philipson, Svensk described the many lessons they learned from the Isaac project. These lessons included “the picture’s importance to accessing the past cannot be overemphasized”. In a classic understatement, Jönsson and Svensk had written several years earlier that “although targeted for a special application, Isaac has the potential for a much wider use”.

== Sources ==
This article incorporates text from a free content work. Licensed under CC0 1.0 Universal. Text taken from Parulski, Ken (November 26, 2024). "Isaac - the 1st camera phone turns 30" – via LinkedIn.
