= Chronolog =

Citizen science platform for long-term environmental monitoring

- Website type: Citizen science
- Area served: Worldwide
- Website: www.chronolog.io
- Launched: 2017
- Current status: Active

Chronolog is a citizen science environmental monitoring platform that enables public participation in time-lapse photography projects. It is used by parks, nature centers, wildlife organizations, schools, and museums to document ecological changes over time. Visitors to participating locations take photos at designated stations and submit them via email, contributing to crowdsourced time-lapse sequences. As of 2024, Chronolog operates in 48 U.S. states and 10 countries and has collected over 100,000 submissions since its launch in 2017.

== History ==
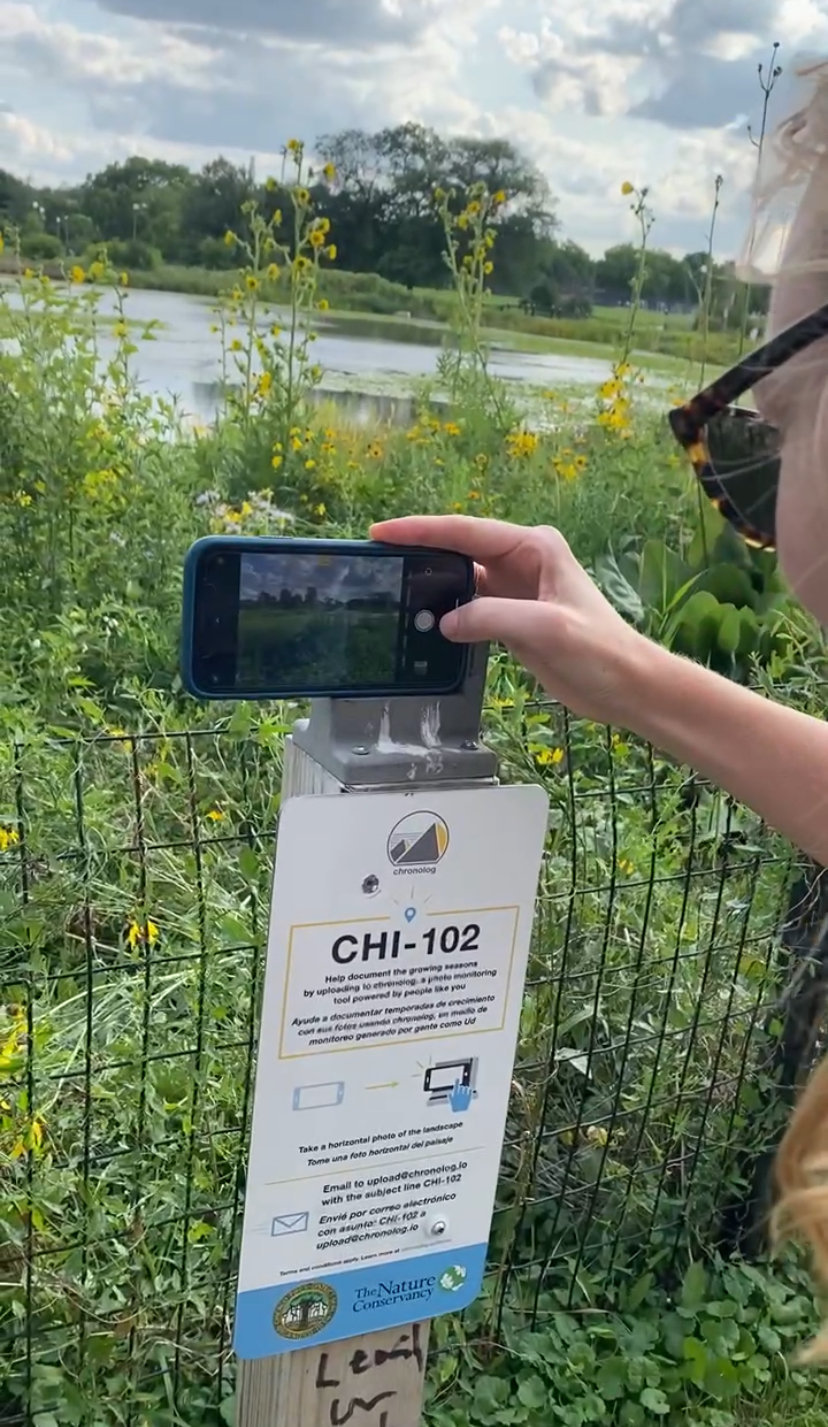
Person submitting a photo to Chronolog citizen science tool at Humboldt Park in Chicago, Illinois, USA.

Chronolog was founded in 2017 by Jake Rose and Ky Wildermuth. The platform began with a small number of photo stations in state parks in Maryland, United States. Since then, it has expanded to include sites across the United States and internationally. Chronolog has been adopted by national organizations in the United States such as the National Park Service and Bureau of Land Management.

== Technology ==
Participating organizations–like state and national parks, wildlife preserves, museums, schools, local and state governments, nature conservancies, and wildlife nonprofits–install fixed photo stations at specific locations, typically overlooking landscapes of ecological interest. These stations guide visitors to align their smartphone cameras at a consistent height and angle. Users then email the photos to Chronolog, where software extracts metadata and assigns the image to a corresponding time-lapse sequence.

Each contributor receives an automated response with information about the site and the ecological changes being monitored. The aggregated photos form visual records that help track changes in vegetation, wildlife activity, water levels, and other environmental features.

Long-term ecological monitoring projects often face challenges related to cost, staffing, and continuity. Chronolog's crowdsourced model has been adopted as a low-cost method to collect consistent visual data over time at participating sites.

== Applications ==
Chronolog is used by land stewards, restoration practitioners, and environmental educators to document ecological trends, track ecosystem health, measure the impact of conservation interventions, and engage the public in science education. Chronolog has been used to monitor habitat restoration, controlled burns, removal of invasive species, planting of native species, ghost forests, wildlife activity, and climate resilience efforts. Chronolog has also been used to monitor events such as wildfire recovery, water levels and quality, snowpack, seasonal changes, and storm impacts.
