= Sha-Mail =

Japanese 2G e-mail service

Sha-Mail (写メール, Sha Mēru) was a 2G mailing and picture messaging service launched by J-Phone (now Softbank) in 2000 that allowed users to take a photo with their mobile phone and send it to another user on the service as an email attachment. A related service introduced in 2002, Video Sha-Mail, let users record and send videos as well. Sha-Mail was widely successful upon its launch, became a household name in Japan, and sparked a boom in camera phone services worldwide. The term derives from sha, the first part of the Japanese word shashin (写真, 'picture'), and mail (from email).

== History ==
Sha-Mail development was led by Keiji Takao, who previously worked for Mazda. Takao came up with the idea on a sight-seeing trip to Hakone with his parents, where he saw a woman on a cable car using her mobile phone, apparently struggling to operate the device and unable to send a photo of the view. He recalled: "Here she was, a lady furiously typing into her handset and trying to relay her feelings and excitement to her children or husband. I said to myself, 'Gee, wouldn't it be easier if there was some sort of an image to send with?'" Takao also reportedly took inspiration from a survey he had read about adolescent girls keeping disposable cameras alongside their phones in their purse. J-Phone, meanwhile, was under pressure from competitors KDDI, which had a faster network, and NTT Docomo, which was preparing to move to 3G, and the company believed it could differentiate itself by focusing on email.

J-Phone launched the Sha-Mail service in November 2000 with the help of electronics company Sharp Corporation, who developed the J-SH04 phone with a built-in, back-facing CCD camera. The J-SH04 was among the first phones in the world with a fully-integrated camera, and at the time, Sha-Mail was Japan's only service of its kind.

The service was quite successful on the market, particularly with young people. J-Phone had sold around 3 million handsets with Sha-Mail enabled by January 2022. Almost three years later, 10 million users were on the service, with around 5 million users using Movie Sha-Mail. In 2002 Vodafone, which had by that point acquired J-Phone, launched Vodafone live! as a global service. By December 2002, the European launch of Vodafone live! brought in more than 380,000 users.

This rapid growth helped J-Phone move from #3 to #2 in total wireless data subscribers. J-Phone's competitors followed suit. Market leader NTT Docomo introduced a similar service with Sharp called i-shot and another named Foma, KDDI's au introduced "Photo Mail" and "Movie Mail" services, and KDDI subsidiary TU-KA introduced "Picture Mail." In the US, AT&T (a NTT Docomo affiliate) launched the mMode Pix feature on Sony Ericsson T68i devices. Sha-Mail's popularity also spawned tie-ins such as a magazine called "J-Phone Sha-mail Hearts" and the TV Aichi series Syamekke, which encouraged users to send in photos and text messages relating to weekly topics, later to be broadcast on the program.

In November 2002, Japan's fair trade commission raided Vodafone's headquarters upon an accusation that the company had prevented retailers from lowering the cost of Sha-Mail enabled handsets upon launch.

Though Vodafone planned to make Sha-Mail a centerpiece of its 3G service, the company lagged well behind its competitors in moving to 3G and capturing users; as of 2004 fewer than 20% of Vodafone subscribers were subscribed to 3G. Thus the now-obsolete Sha-Mail never upgraded to 3G, effectively ending Sha-Mail once support for 2G networks ceased.

The word Japanese word shamēru, often abbreviated to shame (写メ), now commonly refers to any text message with an image attached.
