= HTC RE =

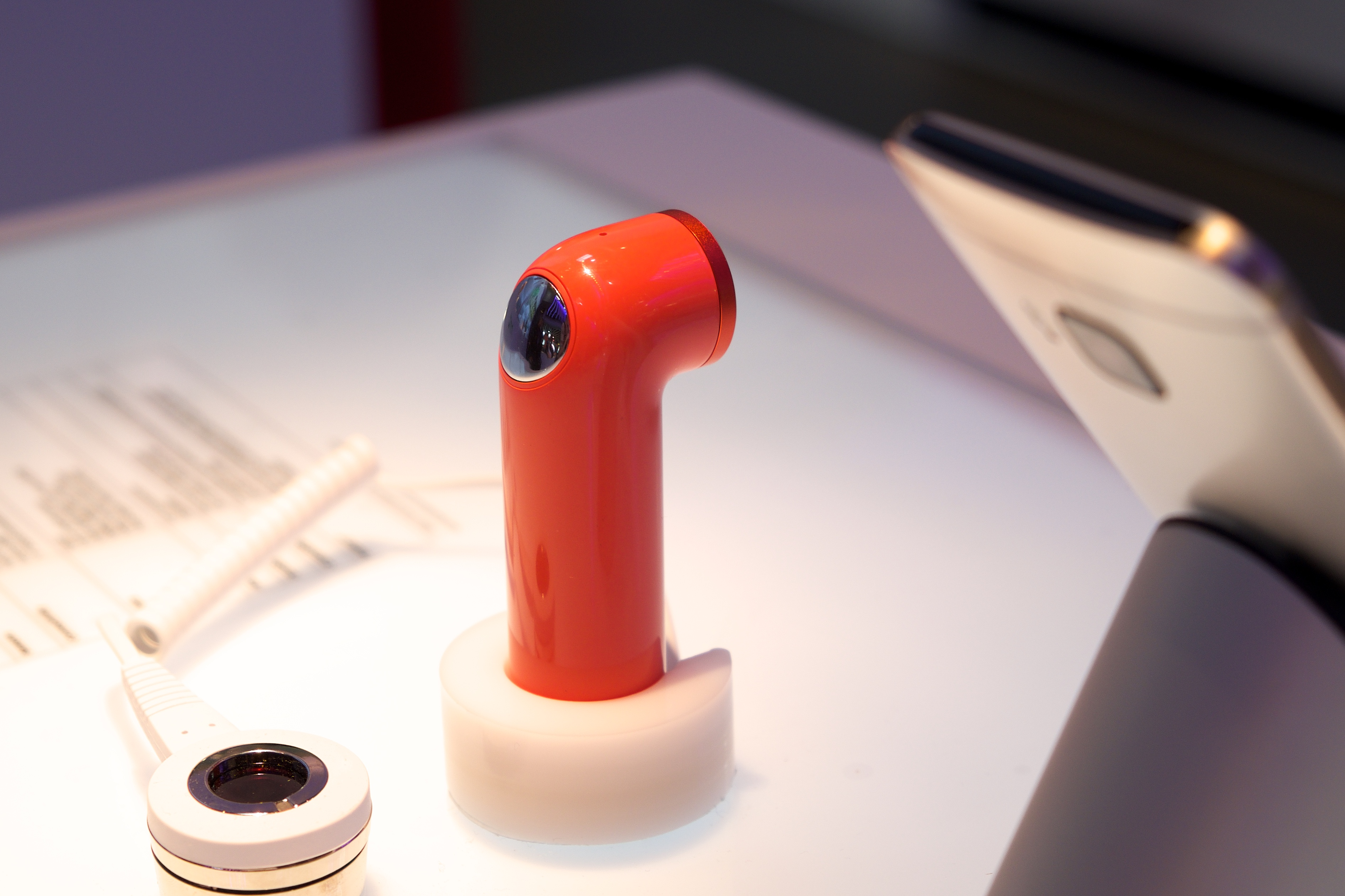
HTC RE Camera on display at MWC 2015

HTC RE refers to a series of products made by HTC, including the RE Camera camera device, Vive virtual-reality headset, and the Grip fitness tracker.
