= Bodil Jönsson =

Swedish physicist and author (born 1942)

Bodil Agneta Jönsson
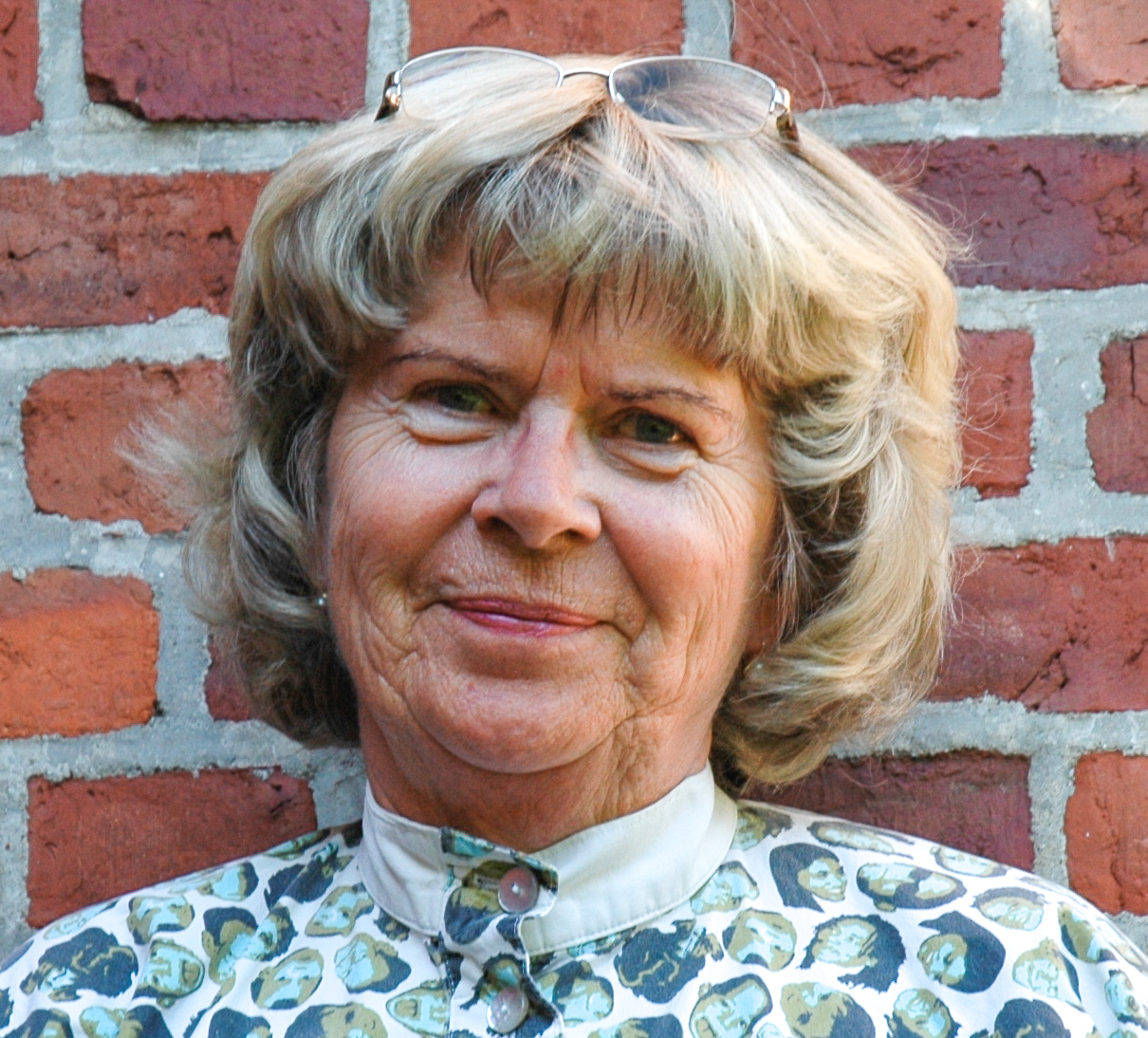
- Born: Bodil Agneta Jönsson; September 12, 1942 (age 83); Helsingborg, Sweden
- Known for: Development of Isaac personal assistant system
- Awards: H. M. The King's Medal (1997); Gold Medal, Royal Swedish Academy of Engineering Sciences (2013)
- Scientific career
- Fields: Physics
- Institutions: Lund University

Bodil Agneta Jönsson (born September 12, 1942, in Helsingborg) is a Swedish physicist and author, who is professor emeritus at the Department of Rehabilitation Technology at Lund University since 1993. Between 1999 and 2019, she has authored about 20 books. Beginning in 1993, she led the development of Isaac, a personal assistant for the disabled, which was also the earliest camera phone and wireless photo system. She received H. M. The King's Medal in the 8th size in 1997, and was awarded a gold medal by the Royal Swedish Academy of Engineering Sciences in 2013.
