= J-SH03 =

Cellphone released by J-Phone

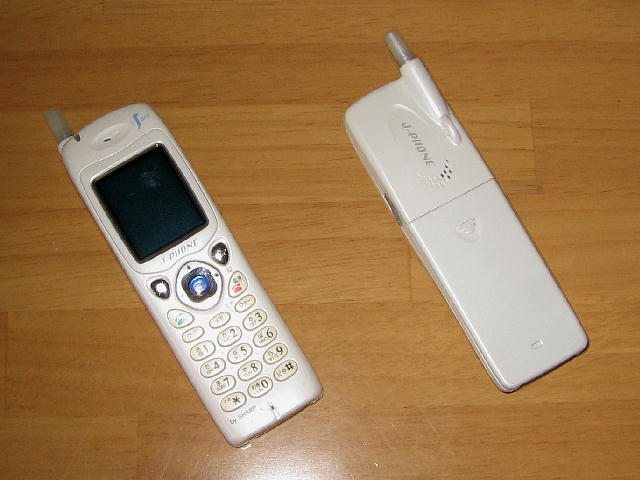
- J-SH03 (Sirius White)
- Brand: J-Phone
- Manufacturer: Sharp
- First released: May 26, 2000
- Availability by region: Japan only
- Compatible networks: PDC (1.5 GHz)
- Form factor: Bar
- Colors: Orion Silver; Sirius White; Earth Blue
- Dimensions: 125×39×17 mm (4.92×1.54×0.67 in)
- Weight: 68 g (2 oz)
- Removable storage: None
- Battery: Standby: Approx. 310 hours Talk: Approx. 120 minutes
- Rear camera: None
- Front camera: None
- Display: 1.6-inch 256-color STN LCD, 96 × 117 pixels

The J-SH03 is a second-generation mobile phone manufactured by Sharp and released by J-Phone. It was announced on May 11, 2000, and was released on May 26. In early July 2000, J-Phone Tokyo released the "J-SH03 Giants Phone," a special Yomiuri Giants-themed mobile phone. Offered as a limited-edition model with an unannounced initial price, its availability was restricted by region; the Kansai and Kyushu regions were explicitly excluded from the release.

The J-SH03 is a minor revision model of the J-SH02, featuring a larger and brighter screen. Additionally, the text display capacity was increased from 56 full-width characters on the J-SH02 to 72 full-width characters.

At the event, J-Phone and NTT Docomo focused on their existing color-screen lineups rather than revealing new concept models. J-Phone, in particular, prominently featured its color devices, providing hands-on access to J-Sky Web-compatible handsets like the J-SH03, J-SA02, and J-T04, despite the lack of brand-new product announcements.

A collaboration model with the Yomiuri Giants baseball team based on this handset, named the "J-SH03 Giants Phone", was also released in areas outside the Kansai and Kyushu regions.
