= Internet Imaging Protocol =

The Internet Imaging Protocol, or IIP, is an Internet protocol designed by the International Imaging Industry Association. IIP is built on top of HTTP to communicate images and their metadata and took inspiration from the FlashPix image architecture. It emerged to tackle the problem that image sizes and resolution was growing faster than internet bandwidth - so it was difficult to quickly browse high quality images in web browsers. IIP allows the detail to be fetched when the user needs it, so the whole data file is not downloaded before.

Practically it defines how software fetches image tiles from a server. This includes the scale of the image - so a small overview image can be retrieved initially. Zooming and panning are carried out by fetching higher resolution image tiles from server. This means any size of image can be viewed on the Web without downloading it all. IIP also makes it possible to use a variety of viewer software whereas other systems may force the use of one server, file format and one viewer.

IIP is currently in version 1.05 and is not actively developing further.
