= International Imaging Industry Association =

Trade association

Logo of the International Imaging Industry Association

The International Imaging Industry Association (I3A) was a trade association created by the merger of the Photographic and Imaging Manufacturers Association (PIMA) and the Digital Imaging Group (DIG) in 2001. It served the photographic industry, which included tracking the market size.

From 2001 through 2010, I3A also served as the sponsor for ANSI and ISO standards for photography, including the Picture Transfer Protocol (ISO 15740), Camera Phone Image Quality (CPIQ), as well as consortia standards such as the Internet Imaging Protocol.

I3A transferred the sponsorship of ANSI and ISO photographic standards to the Society for Imaging Science and Technology in January 2011, it transferred sponsorship of the CPIQ standard to IEEE. It had been disbanded as of October 2013.

== PIMA and NAPM ==
The Photographic and Imaging Manufacturers Association, or PIMA, was founded in 1946 under the name National Association of Photographic Manufacturers (NAPM). In 1997 the name was changed to PIMA. NAPM and PIMA served as the sponsor for ANSI and ISO standards for photography from 1946 until 2001, when NAPM merged with DIG to become I3A.
