= HTC RE Camera =

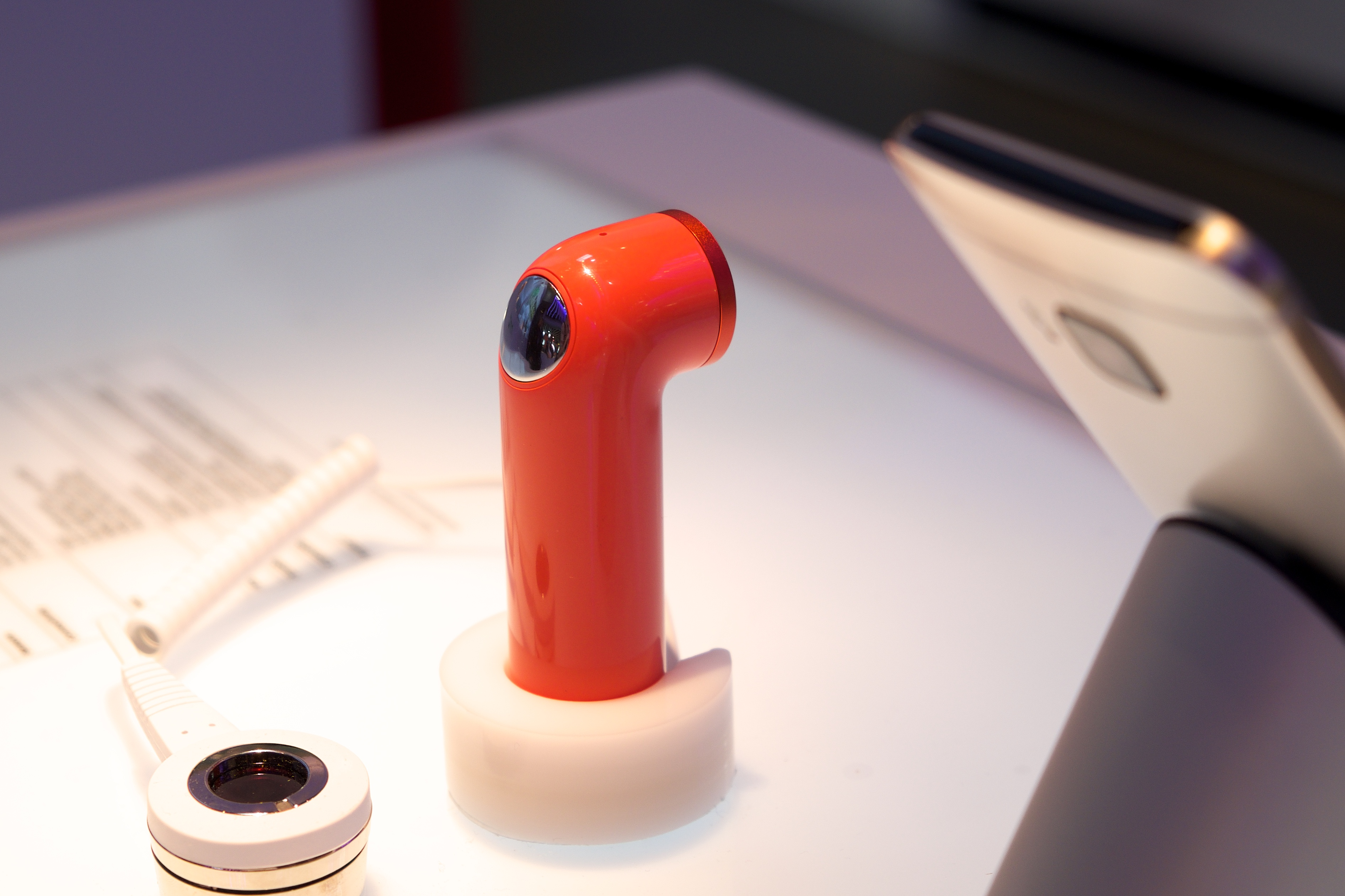
HTC RE Camera on display at MWC 2015

The HTC RE Camera is a camera introduced by HTC in 2014. It offers a 16MP sensor supporting 1080p video capture, intrusion protection, and is able to connect with smartphones through a dedicated application. Reception to the camera has been mostly positive.

== Design ==
The design of the HTC RE Camera has been described as "a tube that's bent on one end, slightly narrower than a roll of quarters" by Android Central, "more periscope than box" and "an upside down asthma inhaler" by Digital Trends and The Verge, and "a strange little thing that resembles an elbow of a pipe, an inhaler, a periscope, or who knows what else" by PhoneArena. The camera measures 96.7 x 26.5 mm and weighs 65.5 grams. The camera supports IP57 protection, with IPx7 protection while used standalone and IPx8 protection when used with a cap. The camera has a Sony-made 16 megapixel 1/2.3" CMOS sensor with f/2.8 aperture scratch-resistant lens. The battery is an 820 mAh unit, supporting 1 hour and 40 minutes of 1080p video recording or 1,200 16-megapixel photos.

The HTC RE Camera does not include a power button. Instead, it includes a grip sensor that allows the camera to be turned on by holding it in a hand. The capturing of videos and photos is done through the shutter button, a large silver button at the top of the device. Photos are taken by tapping on the button, and videos are taken by pressing and holding on the button. LED lighting embedded in the button shows the status of the camera. Videos and photos are recorded onto a microSD card inserted into the bottom of the camera, which supports a microSD card of up to 128 GB, but HTC provides an 8 GB card. Apart from a microSD card slot, the bottom of the device also includes a 6.4 mm (1/4 in) 20-thread tripod screw socket and a microUSB port for battery charging and data transfer.

A separate RE application supports smartphone devices with Android 4.3 or later and iOS 7 or later. The application connects the phone with the camera over Bluetooth 4.0 and Wi-Fi. The application allows using the camera as a viewfinder, adjusting the settings of the camera such as resolution, frame rate and time lapse, and transferring videos and photos from the camera to the smartphone.

== Reception ==
The HTC RE Camera received generally positive reviews. Joshua Goldman of CNET gave the camera a 7.2 out of 10, noting the simplicity of the camera, the waterproof feature, and mobile application as its good points, and shutter lag, mediocre video and photo quality, non-removable battery, and slippery body as its bad points. Brad Molen of Engadget gave the camera a 75 out of 100, saying that the advantages of the device was that it was "fun to use", small and lightweight, comfortable while used with one hand, waterproof, and can be used standalone from a smartphone, while the disadvantages were that the camera quality was not better than most flagship smartphones, slightly high price, lack of HDR, flashlight and other features, subpar iOS app, average battery life, and odd-looking wide angle shots. PhoneArena gave the camera a 7 out of 10, noting that the camera was quick to capture photos, and the grip was comfortable, but also noted that the image quality in low light was sub-par, the video recording lacked sharpness, shutter speeds were too slow and lacked manual adjustment, low battery life, mediocre audio recording quality, lack of optical image stabilization, and steep pricing. Les Shu of Digital Trends gave the camera a 3.5 out of 5, listing its design, wide-angle lens, ease of use, and photo quality as its strengths, and the reliance on the standalone app, video quality, short battery life, and high price as its weaknesses.
