= World cinema =

Term in film theory

World cinema is a term in film theory in the United States that refers to films made outside of the American motion picture industry, particularly those in opposition to the aesthetics, language and values of commercial American cinema. The Third Cinema, the Latino and South American cinema, as well as the European, Asian and various non-English language national cinemas are commonly identified as part of world cinema. The term criticizes the Americentrism as well as the ignorance of different cinematic traditions and filmmaking diversity around the world.

== Types ==
World cinema has an unofficial implication of films with "artistic value" as opposed to "Hollywood commercialism." Foreign language films are often grouped with "art house films" and other independent films in DVD stores, cinema listings, etc. Few films of this kind receive more than a limited release and many are never played in major cinemas. As such the marketing, popularity and gross takings for these films are usually markedly less than for typical Hollywood blockbusters.

Unless dubbed into one's native language, foreign language films played in English-speaking regions usually have English subtitles. The combination of subtitles and minimal exposure adds to the notion that "World Cinema" has an inferred artistic prestige or intelligence, which may discourage less sophisticated viewers. Additionally, differences in cultural style and tone between foreign and domestic films affect attendance at cinemas and DVD sales.

Foreign language films can be commercial, low brow or B-movies. Furthermore, foreign language films can cross cultural boundaries, particularly when the visual spectacle and style are sufficient to overcome people's misgivings. Films of this type became more common in the early 2000s, as Crouching Tiger, Hidden Dragon, Amélie, Brotherhood of the Wolf, Y Tu Mama Tambien and Talk to Her enjoyed great successes in United States cinemas and home video sales. The first foreign and foreign language film to top the North American box office was Hero in August 2004. "The rule for foreign-language films is that if you've done $5 million or better (in United States cinemas), you've had a very nice success; if you do $10 (million) or better (in United States cinemas), you're in blockbuster category," Warner Independent Pictures ex-president Mark Gill said in 2009.

On the other hand, English-dubbed foreign films rarely did well in the United States box office (except anime films). The 1982 United States theatrical release of Wolfgang Petersen's Das Boot was the last major release to go out in both original and English-dubbed versions, and the film's original version actually grossed much higher than the English-dubbed version. Later on, English-dubbed versions of international hits like Un indien dans la ville, Godzilla 2000, Anatomy, Pinocchio and High Tension flopped at United States box office. When Miramax planned to release the English-dubbed versions of Shaolin Soccer and Hero in the United States cinemas, their English-dubbed versions scored badly in test screenings in the United States, so Miramax finally released the films in United States cinemas with their original language.

=== Pioneering film-making on camera phones ===
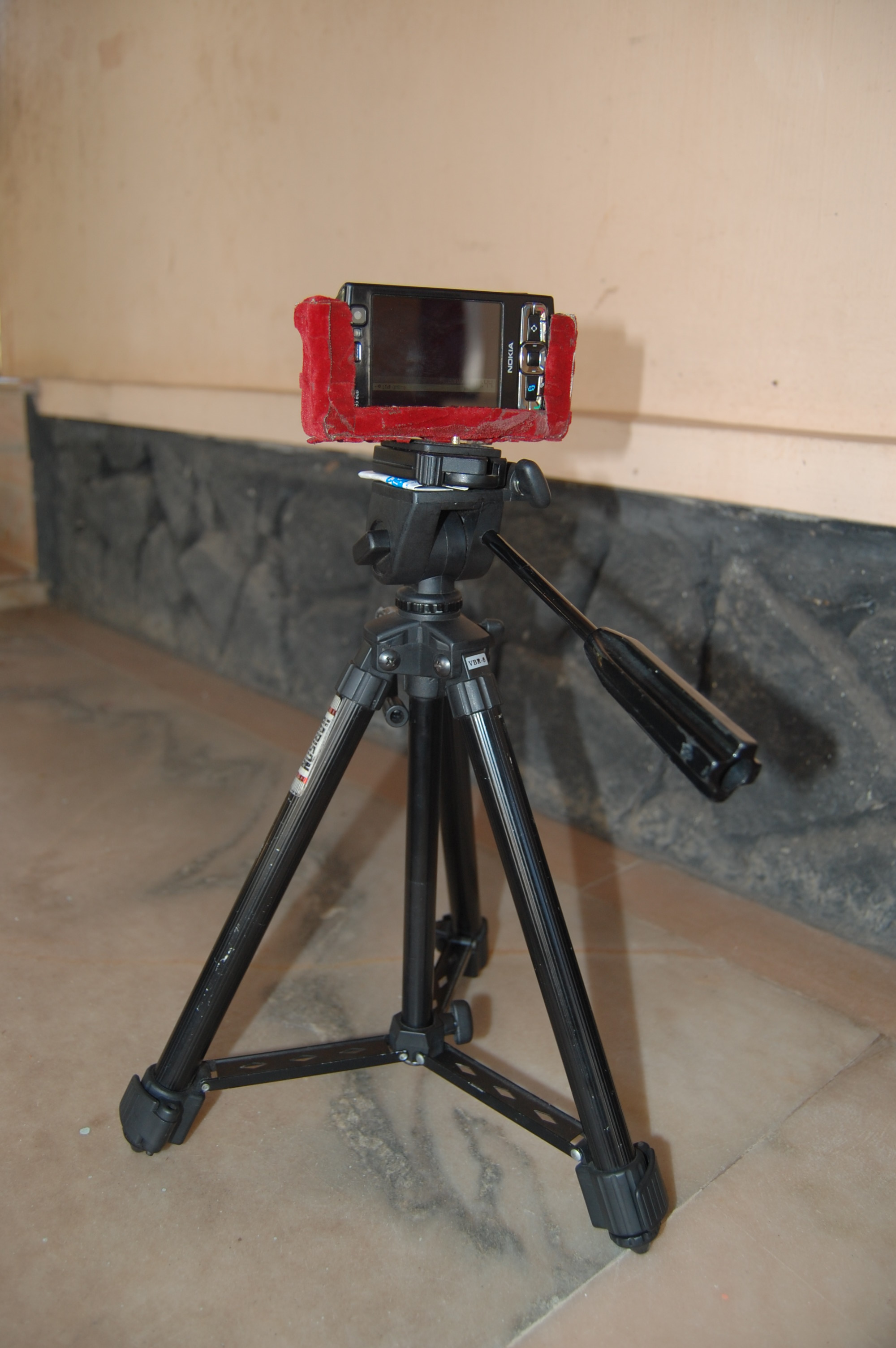
The Nokia N95 mobile phone on tripod which was used to shoot Jalachhayam mobile phone film

After the launch of high pixel camera phones, they are being widely used for filmmaking. The early films, made with camera phones are: New Love Meetings, a documentary film shot on Nokia N90, directed by Barbara Seghezzi and Marcello Mencarini in 2005 from Italy; Why Didn't Anybody Tell Me It Would Become This Bad in Afghanistan, the first narrative feature shot with a camera phone; a Samsung, directed by Cyrus Frisch in 2007 from Netherlands; SMS Sugar Man, a narrative film shot on Sony Ericsson W900i, directed by Aryan Kaganof in 2008 from South Africa; Veenavaadanam a documentary film shot on Nokia N70, directed by Sathish Kalathil in 2008 from India; Jalachhayam a narrative film shot on Nokia N95, directed by Sathish Kalathil in 2010 from India. These are among the first noted experimental works with the first-generation camera phones, which paved the way for other filmmakers across the globe.

Hooked Up, To Jennifer, Tangerine, 9 Rides, Unsane, High Flying Bird, Ghost, Pondicherry I WeirDo, Banger are some examples shot on iPhones.

== See also ==
- Why Didn't Anybody Tell Me It Would Become This Bad in Afghanistan
- List of films shot on mobile phones
- Art film
- Film industry
- Independent film
- International co-production
- List of cinema industries by location
- Transnational cinema
- World Cinema Project
