= Independent film =

Film done outside of the major film studio system

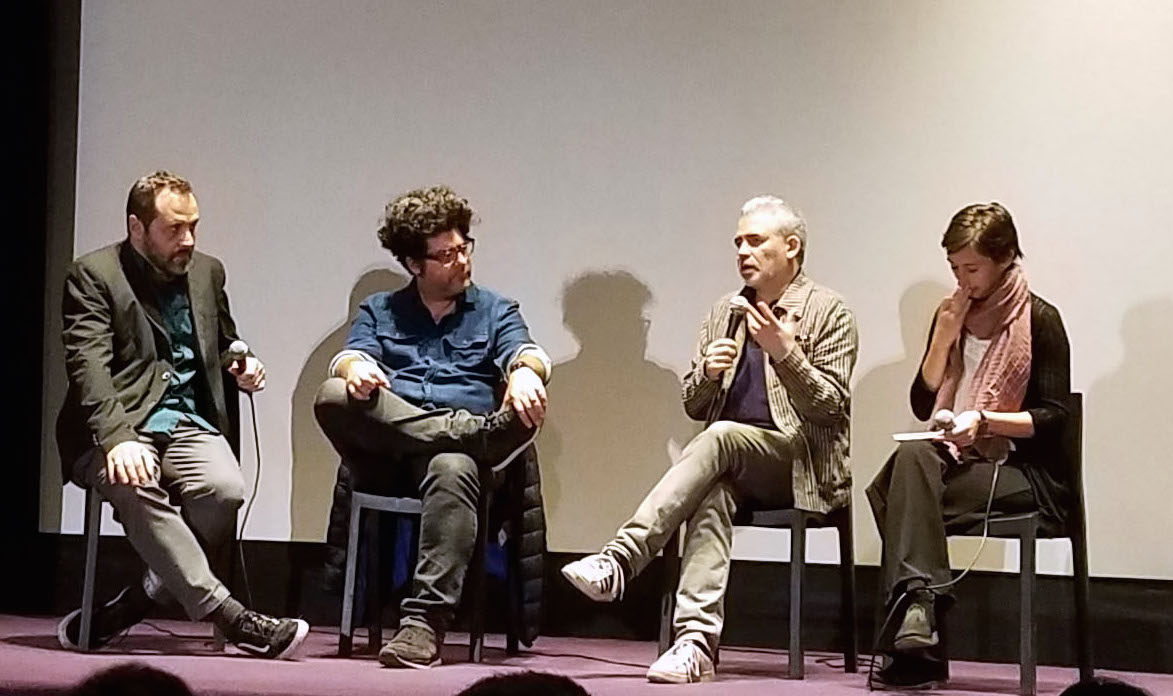
Filmmakers Stéphane Brizé (second from the right) and Rodrigo Moreno (second from the left) at a screening of The Measure of a Man in Buenos Aires in 2019

An independent film, independent movie, indie film, or indie movie is a feature film or short film that is produced outside the major film studio system in addition to being produced and distributed by independent entertainment companies (or, in some cases, distributed by major companies). Independent films are typically distinguishable by their content and style, and how the filmmakers' artistic vision is realized. Usually, independent films are made with considerably lower budgets than major studio films.

It is not unusual for well-known actors who are cast in independent features to take substantial pay cuts for a variety of reasons: if they truly believe in the message of the film; they feel indebted to a filmmaker for a career break; their career is otherwise stalled, or they feel unable to manage a more significant commitment to a studio film; the film offers an opportunity to showcase a talent that has not gained traction in the studio system; or simply because they want to work with a particular director they admire. Examples of the latter include John Travolta and Bruce Willis taking less than their usual pay to work with Quentin Tarantino on Pulp Fiction.

Generally, the marketing of independent films is characterized by limited release, often at independent movie theaters, but they can also have major marketing campaigns and a wide release. Independent films are often screened at local, national, or international film festivals before distribution (theatrical or retail release). An independent film production can rival a mainstream film production if it has the necessary funding and distribution.

== History ==
=== Edison Trust ===
In 1908, the Motion Picture Patents Company or "Edison Trust" was formed as a trust. The Trust was a cartel that held a monopoly on film production and distribution comprising all the major film companies of the time (Edison, Biograph, Vitagraph, Essanay, Selig, Lubin, Kalem, American Star, American Pathé), the leading distributor (George Kleine) and the biggest supplier of raw film, Eastman Kodak. A number of filmmakers declined or were refused membership to the trust and came to be described as "independent".

At the time of the formation of the MPPC, Thomas Edison owned most of the major patents relating to motion pictures, including that for raw film. The MPPC vigorously enforced its patents, constantly bringing suits and receiving injunctions against independent filmmakers. Because of this, a number of filmmakers responded by building their own cameras and moving their operations to Hollywood, California, where the distance from Edison's home base of New Jersey made it more difficult for the MPPC to enforce its patents.

The Edison Trust was soon ended by two decisions of the Supreme Court of the United States: one in 1912, which canceled the patent on raw film, and a second in 1915, which cancelled all MPPC patents. Though these decisions succeeded at legalizing independent film, they would do little to remedy the de facto ban on small productions; the independent filmmakers who had fled to Southern California during the enforcement of the trust had already laid the groundwork for the studio system of classical Hollywood cinema.

=== Studio system ===
In early 1910, director D.W. Griffith was sent by the Biograph Company to the west coast with his acting troupe, consisting of performers Blanche Sweet, Lillian Gish, Mary Pickford, Lionel Barrymore, and others. They began filming on a vacant lot near Georgia Street in downtown Los Angeles. While there, the company decided to explore new territories, traveling several miles north to Hollywood, a little village that was friendly and positive about the movie company filming there. Griffith then filmed the first movie ever shot in Hollywood, In Old California, a Biograph melodrama about California in the 1800s, while it belonged to Mexico. Griffith stayed there for months and made several films before returning to New York.

During the Edison era of the early 1900s, many Jewish immigrants had found jobs in the U.S. film industry. Under the Edison Trust, they were able to make their mark in a brand-new business: the exhibition of films in storefront theaters called nickelodeons. Within a few years, ambitious men like Samuel Goldwyn, Carl Laemmle, Adolph Zukor, Louis B. Mayer, and the Warner Brothers (Harry, Albert, Samuel, and Jack) had switched to the production side of the business. After hearing about Biograph's success in Hollywood, in 1913 many such would-be movie-makers headed west to avoid the fees imposed by Edison. Soon they were the heads of a new kind of enterprise: the movie studio.

By establishing a new system of production, distribution, and exhibition which was independent of The Edison Trust in New York, these studios opened up new horizons for cinema in the United States. The Hollywood oligopoly replaced the Edison monopoly. Within this new system, a pecking order was soon established which left little room for any newcomers. By the mid-1930s, at the top were the five major studios, 20th Century Fox, Metro-Goldwyn-Mayer, Paramount Pictures, RKO Pictures, and Warner Bros. Then came three smaller companies, Columbia Pictures, United Artists, and Universal Studios. Finally there was "Poverty Row", a catch-all term used to encompass any other smaller studio that managed to fight their way up into the increasingly exclusive movie business.

While the small studios that made up Poverty Row operate "independently" of any major studio, they also use the same kind of vertically and horizontally integrated systems of business as larger studios. Though the eventual breakup of the studio system, and its restrictive chain-theater distribution network, would leave independent movie houses eager for the kind of populist, seat-filling product of the Poverty Row studios, that shift would also lead to the decline and ultimate disappearance of "Poverty Row" as a Hollywood phenomenon. While the kinds of films produced by Poverty Row studios only grew in popularity, they would eventually become increasingly available, both from major production companies and from independent producers, who no longer needed to rely on a studio's traditional role and ability to package and release their work.

This table lists the companies active in late 1935 illustrates the categories commonly used to characterize the Hollywood system.

Big Five majors	Little Three majors	Poverty Row (top four of many)
Metro-Goldwyn-Mayer	United Artists	Grand National
Paramount Pictures	Columbia Pictures	Republic Pictures
20th Century Fox	Universal Studios	Monogram Pictures
Warner Bros.		Producers Releasing Corporation (a.k.a. PRC)
RKO Pictures		

=== Lincoln Motion Picture Company, United Artists and resistance to the studio system ===
The studio system quickly became so powerful that some filmmakers once again sought independence. On May 24, 1916, the Lincoln Motion Picture Company was formed, the first movie studio owned and controlled by independent filmmakers. In 1919, four of the leading figures in American silent cinema (Mary Pickford, Charles Chaplin, Douglas Fairbanks, and D. W. Griffith) formed United Artists. Each held a 20% stake, with the remaining 20% held by lawyer William Gibbs McAdoo. The idea for the venture originated with Fairbanks, Chaplin, Pickford, and cowboy star William S. Hart a year earlier as they were traveling around the U.S. selling Liberty bonds to help the World War I effort. Already veterans of Hollywood, the four film stars began to talk of forming their own company to better control their own work as well as their futures. They were spurred on by the actions of established Hollywood producers and distributors, who were making moves to tighten their control over their stars' salaries and creative license. With the addition of Griffith, planning began, but Hart bowed out before things had formalized. When he heard about their scheme, Richard A. Rowland, head of Metro Pictures, is said to have observed, "The inmates are taking over the asylum."

The four partners, with advice from McAdoo (son-in-law and former Treasury Secretary of then-President Woodrow Wilson), formed their distribution company, with Hiram Abrams as its first managing director. The original terms called for Pickford, Fairbanks, Griffith, and Chaplin to independently produce five pictures each year, but by the time the company got underway in 1920–1921, feature films were becoming more expensive and more polished, and running times had settled at around ninety minutes (or eight reels). It was believed that no one, no matter how popular, could produce and star in five quality feature films a year. By 1924, Griffith had dropped out and the company was facing a crisis: either bring in others to help support a costly distribution system or concede defeat. The veteran producer Joseph Schenck was hired as president. Not only had he been producing pictures for a decade, but he brought along commitments for films starring his wife, Norma Talmadge, his sister-in-law, Constance Talmadge, and his brother-in-law, Buster Keaton. Contracts were signed with a number of independent producers, especially Samuel Goldwyn, Howard Hughes and later Alexander Korda. Schenck also formed a separate partnership with Pickford and Chaplin to buy and build theaters under the United Artists name.

Still, even with a broadening of the company, UA struggled. The coming of sound ended the careers of Pickford and Fairbanks. Chaplin, rich enough to do what he pleased, worked only occasionally. Schenck resigned in 1933 to organize a new company with Darryl F. Zanuck, Twentieth Century Pictures, which soon provided four pictures a year to UA's schedule. He was replaced as president by sales manager Al Lichtman who himself resigned after only a few months. Pickford produced a few films, and at various times Goldwyn, Korda, Walt Disney, Walter Wanger, and David O. Selznick were made "producing partners" (i.e., sharing in the profits), but ownership still rested with the founders. As the years passed and the dynamics of the business changed, these "producing partners" drifted away. Goldwyn and Disney left for RKO, Wanger for Universal Pictures, Selznick and Korda for retirement. By the late 1940s, United Artists had virtually ceased to exist as either a producer or distributor.

=== Society of Independent Motion Picture Producers ===
In 1941, Mary Pickford, Charles Chaplin, Walt Disney, Orson Welles, Samuel Goldwyn, David O. Selznick, Alexander Korda, and Walter Wanger—many of the same people who were members of United Artists—founded the Society of Independent Motion Picture Producers. Later members included William Cagney, Sol Lesser, and Hal Roach. The Society aimed to preserve the rights of independent producers in an industry overwhelmingly controlled by the studio system. SIMPP fought to end monopolistic practices by the five major Hollywood studios which controlled the production, distribution, and exhibition of films. In 1942, the SIMPP filed an antitrust suit against Paramount's United Detroit Theatres. The complaint accused Paramount of conspiracy to control first-run and subsequent-run theaters in Detroit. It was the first antitrust suit brought by producers against exhibitors alleging monopoly and restraint of trade. In 1948, the United States Supreme Court Paramount Decision ordered the Hollywood movie studios to sell their theater chains and to eliminate certain anti-competitive practices. This effectively brought an end to the studio system of Hollywood's Golden Age. By 1958, many of the reasons for creating the SIMPP had been corrected and SIMPP closed its offices.

=== Low-budget films ===
The efforts of the SIMPP and the advent of inexpensive portable cameras during World War II effectively made it possible for any person in America with an interest in making films to write, produce, and direct one without the aid of any major film studio. These circumstances soon resulted in a number of critically acclaimed and highly influential works, including Maya Deren's Meshes of the Afternoon in 1943, Kenneth Anger's Fireworks in 1947, and Morris Engel, Ruth Orkin and Ray Abrashkin's Little Fugitive in 1953. Filmmakers such as Ken Jacobs, with little or no formal training, began to experiment with new ways of making and shooting films.

Little Fugitive became the first independent film to be nominated for Academy Award for Best Original Screenplay at the American Academy Awards. It also received Silver Lion at Venice. Both Engel and Anger's films won acclaim overseas from the burgeoning French New Wave, with Fireworks inspiring praise and an invitation to study under him in Europe from Jean Cocteau, and François Truffaut citing Little Fugitive as an essential inspiration to his seminal work, The 400 Blows. As the 1950s progressed, the new low-budget paradigm of filmmaking gained increased recognition internationally, with films such as Satyajit Ray's critically acclaimed Apu Trilogy (1955–1959).

Unlike the films made within the studio system, these new low-budget films could afford to take risks and explore new artistic territory outside the classical Hollywood narrative. Maya Deren was soon joined in New York by a crowd of like-minded avant-garde filmmakers who were interested in creating films as works of art rather than entertainment. Based upon a common belief that the "official cinema" was "running out of breath" and had become "morally corrupt, aesthetically obsolete, thematically superficial, [and] temperamentally boring", this new crop of independents formed The Film-Makers' Cooperative, an artist-run, non-profit organization which they would use to distribute their films through a centralized archive. Founded in 1962 by Jonas Mekas, Stan Brakhage, Shirley Clarke, Gregory Markopoulos, and others, the Cooperative provided an important outlet for many of cinema's creative luminaries in the 1960s, including Jack Smith and Andy Warhol. When he returned to America, Ken Anger would debut many of his most important works there. Mekas and Brakhage would go on to found the Anthology Film Archives in 1970, which would likewise prove essential to the development and preservation of independent films, even to this day.

=== Exploitation boom and the MPAA rating system ===
Not all low-budget films existed as non-commercial art ventures. The success of films like Little Fugitive, which had been made with low (or sometimes non-existent) budgets encouraged a huge boom in popularity for non-studio films. Low-budget film making promised exponentially greater returns (in terms of percentages) if the film could have a successful run in the theaters. During this time, independent producer/director Roger Corman began a sweeping body of work that would become legendary for its frugality and grueling shooting schedule. Until his so-called "retirement" as a director in 1971 (he continued to produce films even after this date), he would produce up to seven movies a year, matching and often exceeding the five-per-year schedule that the executives at United Artists had once thought impossible.

Like those of the avant-garde, the films of Roger Corman took advantage of the fact that unlike the studio system, independent films had never been bound by its self-imposed production code. Corman's example (and that of others like him) would help start a boom in independent B-movies in the 1960s, the principal aim of which was to bring in the youth market which the major studios had lost touch with. By promising sex, wanton violence, drug use, and nudity, these films hoped to draw audiences to independent theaters by offering to show them what the major studios could not. Horror and science fiction films experienced a period of tremendous growth during this time. As these tiny producers, theaters, and distributors continued to attempt to undercut one another, the B-grade shlock film soon fell to the level of the Z movie, a niche category of films with production values so low that they became a spectacle in their own right. The cult audiences these pictures attracted soon made them ideal candidates for midnight movie screenings revolving around audience participation and cosplay.

In 1968, a young filmmaker named George A. Romero shocked audiences with Night of the Living Dead, a new kind of intense and unforgiving independent horror film. This film was released just after the abandonment of the production code, but before the adoption of the MPAA rating system. As such, it was the first and last film of its kind to enjoy a completely unrestricted screening, in which young children were able to witness Romero's new brand of highly realistic gore. This film would help to set the climate of independent horror for decades to come, as films like The Texas Chain Saw Massacre (1974) and Cannibal Holocaust (1980) continued to push the envelope.

With the production code abandoned and violent and disturbing films like Romero's gaining popularity, Hollywood opted to placate the uneasy filmgoing public with the MPAA ratings system, which would place restrictions on ticket sales to young people. Unlike the production code, this rating system posed a threat to independent films in that it would affect the number of tickets they could sell and cut into the grindhouse theaters' share of the youth market. This change would further widen the divide between commercial and non-commercial films.

However, having a film audience-classified is strictly voluntary for independents and there is no legal impediment to releasing movies on an unrated basis. However, unrated movies face obstacles in marketing because media outlets, such as TV channels, newspapers and websites, often place their own restrictions on movies that do not come with a built-in national rating, in order to avoid presenting movies to inappropriately young audiences.

=== New Hollywood and independent filmmaking ===
Following the advent of television and the Paramount Case, the major studios attempted to lure audiences with spectacle. Widescreen processes and technical improvements, such as Cinemascope, stereo sound, 3-D and others, were developed in an attempt to retain the dwindling audience by giving them a larger-than-life experience. The 1950s and early 1960s saw a Hollywood dominated by musicals, historical epics, and other films which benefited from these advances. This proved commercially viable during most of the 1950s. However, by the late 1960s, audience share was dwindling at an alarming rate. Several costly flops, including Cleopatra (1963) and Hello, Dolly! (1969) put severe strain on the studios. Meanwhile, in 1951, lawyers-turned-producers Arthur Krim and Robert Benjamin had made a deal with the remaining stockholders of United Artists which would allow them to make an attempt to revive the company and, if the attempt was successful, buy it after five years.

The attempt was a success, and in 1955 United Artists became the first "studio" without an actual studio. UA leased space at the Pickford/Fairbanks Studio, but did not own a studio lot as such. Because of this, many of their films would be shot on location. Primarily acting as bankers, they offered money to independent producers. Thus UA did not have the overhead, the maintenance or the expensive production staff which ran up costs at other studios. UA went public in 1956, and as the other mainstream studios fell into decline, UA prospered, adding relationships with the Mirisch brothers, Billy Wilder, Joseph E. Levine and others.

By the late 1950s, RKO had ceased film production, and the remaining four of the big five had recognized that they did not know how to reach the youth audience. In an attempt to capture this audience, the Studios hired a host of young filmmakers (many of whom were mentored by Roger Corman) and allowed them to make their films with relatively little studio control. Warner Brothers offered first-time producer Warren Beatty 40% of the gross on his film Bonnie and Clyde (1967) instead of a minimal fee. The movie had grossed over $70 million worldwide by 1973. These initial successes paved the way for the studio to relinquish almost complete control to the film school generation and began what the media dubbed "New Hollywood."

Dennis Hopper, the American actor, made his writing and directing debut with Easy Rider (1969). Along with his producer/co-star/co-writer Peter Fonda, Hopper was responsible for one of the first completely independent films of New Hollywood. Easy Rider debuted at Cannes and garnered the "First Film Award" (French: Prix de la premiere oeuvre) after which it received two Oscar nominations, one for best original screenplay and one for Corman-alum Jack Nicholson's breakthrough performance in the supporting role of George Hanson, an alcoholic lawyer for the American Civil Liberties Union. Following on the heels of Easy Rider shortly afterward was the revived United Artists' Midnight Cowboy (also 1969), which, like Easy Rider, took numerous cues from Kenneth Anger and his influences in the French New Wave. It became the first and only X rated film to win the Academy Award for Best Picture. Midnight Cowboy also held the distinction of featuring cameo roles by many of the top Warhol superstars, who had already become symbols of the militantly anti-Hollywood climate of NYC's independent film community.

Within a month, another young Corman trainee, Francis Ford Coppola, made his debut in Spain at the Donostia-San Sebastian International Film Festival with The Rain People (1969), a film he had produced through his own company, American Zoetrope. Though The Rain People was largely overlooked by American audiences, Zoetrope would become a powerful force in New Hollywood. Through Zoetrope, Coppola formed a distribution agreement with studio giant Warner Bros., which he would exploit to achieve wide releases for his films without making himself subject to their control. These three films provided the major Hollywood studios with both an example to follow and a new crop of talent to draw from. Zoetrope co-founder George Lucas made his feature film debut with THX 1138 (1971), also released by Zoetrope through their deal with Warner Bros., announcing himself as another major talent of New Hollywood. By the following year, two New Hollywood directors had become sufficiently established for Coppola to be offered oversight of Paramount's The Godfather (1972) and Lucas had obtained studio funding for American Graffiti (1973) from Universal. In the mid-1970s, the major Hollywood studios continued to tap these new filmmakers for both ideas and personnel, producing films such as Paper Moon (1973) and Taxi Driver (1976), all of which met with critical and commercial success. These successes by the members of New Hollywood led each of them, in turn, to make more and more extravagant demands, both on the studio and eventually on the audience.

While most members of the New Hollywood generation were, or started out as, independent filmmakers, a number of their projects were produced and released by major studios. The New Hollywood generation soon became firmly entrenched in a revived incarnation of the studio system, which financed the development, production and distribution of their films. Very few of these filmmakers ever independently financed or independently released a film of their own, or ever worked on an independently financed production during the height of the generation's influence. Seemingly independent films such as Taxi Driver, The Last Picture Show and others were studio films: the scripts were based on studio pitches and subsequently paid for by the studios, the production financing was from the studio, and the marketing and distribution of the films were designed and controlled by the studio's advertising agency. Though Coppola made considerable efforts to resist the influence of the studios, opting to finance his risky 1979 film Apocalypse Now himself rather than compromise with skeptical studio executives, he, and filmmakers like him, had saved the old studios from financial ruin by providing them with a new formula for success.

Indeed, it was during this period that the very definition of an independent film became blurred. Though Midnight Cowboy was financed by United Artists, the company was certainly a studio. Likewise, Zoetrope was another "independent studio" which worked within the system to make a space for independent directors who needed funding. George Lucas would leave Zoetrope in 1971 to create his own independent studio, Lucasfilm, which would produce the blockbuster Star Wars and Indiana Jones franchises. In fact, the only two movies of the movement which can be described as uncompromisingly independent are Easy Rider at the beginning, and Peter Bogdanovich's They All Laughed, at the end. Peter Bogdanovich bought back the rights from the studio to his 1980 film and paid for its distribution out of his own pocket, convinced that the picture was better than what the studio believed — he eventually went bankrupt because of this.

In retrospect, it can be seen that Steven Spielberg's Jaws (1975) and George Lucas's Star Wars (1977) marked the beginning of the end for the New Hollywood. With their unprecedented box-office successes, these movies jump-started Hollywood's blockbuster mentality, giving studios a new paradigm as to how to make money in this changing commercial landscape. The focus on high-concept premises, with greater concentration on tie-in merchandise (such as toys), spin-offs into other media (such as soundtracks), and the use of sequels (which had been made more respectable by Coppola's The Godfather Part II), all showed the studios how to make money in the new environment.

On realizing how much money could potentially be made in films, major corporations started buying up the remaining Hollywood studios, saving them from the oblivion which befell RKO in the 50s. Eventually, even RKO was revived, the corporate mentality these companies brought to the filmmaking business would slowly squeeze out the more idiosyncratic of these young filmmakers, while promoting the more malleable and commercially successful of them.

Film critic Manohla Dargis described this era as the "halcyon age" of the decade's filmmaking that "was less revolution than business as usual, with rebel hype". She also pointed out in her New York Times article that enthusiasts insisted this era was "when American movies grew up (or at least starred underdressed actresses); when directors did what they wanted (or at least were transformed into brands); when creativity ruled (or at least ran gloriously amok, albeit often on the studio's dime)."

=== Outside Hollywood ===
During the 1970s, shifts in thematic depictions of sexuality and violence occurred in American cinema, prominently featuring heightened depictions of realistic sex and violence. Directors who wished to reach mainstream audiences of Old Hollywood quickly learned to stylize these themes to make their films appealing and attractive rather than repulsive or obscene. However, at the same time that the maverick film students of the American New Wave were developing the skills they would use to take over Hollywood, many of their peers had begun to develop their style of filmmaking in a different direction. Influenced by foreign and art house directors such as Ingmar Bergman and Federico Fellini, exploitation shockers (i.e. Joseph P. Mawra, Michael Findlay, and Henri Pachard) and avant-garde cinema, (Kenneth Anger, Maya Deren and Bruce Conner) a number of young film makers began to experiment with transgression not as a box-office draw, but as an artistic act. Directors such as John Waters and David Lynch would make a name for themselves by the early 1970s for the bizarre and often disturbing imagery which characterized their films.

When Lynch's first feature film, Eraserhead (1977), brought Lynch to the attention of producer Mel Brooks, he soon found himself in charge of the $5 million film The Elephant Man (1980) for Paramount. Though Eraserhead was strictly an out-of-pocket, low-budget, independent film, Lynch made the transition with unprecedented grace. The film was a huge commercial success, and earned eight Academy Award nominations, including Best Director and Best Adapted Screenplay nods for Lynch. It also established his place as a commercially viable, if somewhat dark and unconventional, Hollywood director. Seeing Lynch as a fellow studio convert, George Lucas, a fan of Eraserhead and now the darling of the studios, offered Lynch the opportunity to direct his next Star Wars sequel, Return of the Jedi (1983). However, Lynch had seen what had happened to Lucas and his comrades in arms after their failed attempt to do away with the studio system. He refused the opportunity, stating that he would rather work on his own projects.

Lynch instead chose to direct a big budget adaptation of Frank Herbert's science fiction novel Dune for Italian producer Dino De Laurentiis's De Laurentiis Entertainment Group, on the condition that the company release a second Lynch project, over which the director would have complete creative control. Although De Laurentiis hoped it would be the next Star Wars, Lynch's Dune (1984) was a critical and commercial flop, grossing a mere $27.4 million domestically against a $45 million budget. De Laurentiis, furious that the film had been a commercial disaster, was then forced to produce any film Lynch desired. He offered Lynch only $6 million in order to minimize the risk if the film had failed to recoup its costs; however, the film, Blue Velvet (1986), was a resounding success, earning him another Academy Award for Best Director nod. Lynch subsequently returned to independent filmmaking, and did not work with another major studio for over a decade.

Unlike the former, John Waters released most of his films during his early life through his own production company, Dreamland Productions. In the early 1980s, New Line Cinema agreed to work with him on Polyester (1981). During the 1980s, Waters would become a pillar of the New York–based independent film movement known as the "Cinema of Transgression", a term coined by Nick Zedd in 1985 to describe a loose-knit group of like-minded New York artists using shock value and humor in their Super 8 mm films and video art. Other key players in this movement included Kembra Pfahler, Casandra Stark, Beth B, Tommy Turner, Richard Kern and Lydia Lunch. Rallying around such institutions as the Film-Makers' Cooperative and Anthology Film Archives, this new generation of independents devoted themselves to the defiance of the now-establishment New Hollywood, proposing that "all film schools be blown up and all boring films never be made again."

=== Independent Cinema movement ===
In 1978, Sterling Van Wagenen and Charles Gary Allison, with Chairperson Robert Redford, (veteran of New Hollywood and star of Butch Cassidy and the Sundance Kid) founded the Utah/US Film Festival in an effort to attract more filmmakers to Utah and showcase what the potential of independent film could be. At the time, the main focus of the event was to present a series of retrospective films and filmmaker panel discussions; however it also included a small program of new independent films. The jury of the 1978 festival was headed by Gary Allison, and included Verna Fields, Linwood Gale Dunn, Katherine Ross, Charles E. Sellier Jr., Mark Rydell, and Anthea Sylbert. In 1981, the same year that United Artists, bought out by MGM after the financial failure of Michael Cimino's Heaven's Gate (1980), ceased to exist as a venue for independent filmmakers, Sterling Van Wagenen left the film festival to help found the Sundance Institute with Robert Redford. In 1985, the now well-established Sundance Institute, headed by Sterling Van Wagenen, took over management of the US Film Festival, which was experiencing financial difficulties. Gary Beer and Sterling Van Wagenen spearheaded production of the inaugural Sundance Film Festival which included Program Director Tony Safford and Administrative Director Jenny Walz Selby.

In 1991, the festival was officially renamed the Sundance Film Festival, after Redford's famous role as The Sundance Kid. Through this festival the Independent Cinema movement was launched. Such notable figures as Kevin Smith, Robert Rodriguez, Quentin Tarantino, David O. Russell, Paul Thomas Anderson, Steven Soderbergh, James Wan, Hal Hartley, Joel and Ethan Coen and Jim Jarmusch garnered resounding critical acclaim and unprecedented box office sales. The significance of the Sundance Film Festival is documented in the work of Professor Emanuel Levy Cinema of Outsiders: The Rise of American Independent Film (NYU Press, 1999; 2001).

In 2005, about 15% of the U.S. domestic box office revenue was from independent studios.

==== Co-optation ====
The 1990s saw the rise and success of independent films not only through the film festival circuit but at the box office as well while established actors, such as Bruce Willis, John Travolta, and Tim Robbins, found success themselves both in independent films and Hollywood studio films. Teenage Mutant Ninja Turtles in 1990 from New Line Cinema grossed over $100 million in the United States making it the most successful indie film in box-office history to that point. Miramax Films had a string of hits with Sex, Lies, and Videotape, My Left Foot, and Clerks, putting Miramax and New Line Cinema in the sights of big companies looking to cash in on the success of independent studios. In 1993, Disney bought Miramax for $60 million. Turner Broadcasting, in a billion-dollar deal, acquired New Line Cinema, Fine Line Features, and Castle Rock Entertainment in 1994. The acquisitions proved to be a good move as New Line released The Mask and Dumb & Dumber, Castle Rock released The Shawshank Redemption, and Miramax released Pulp Fiction, all in 1994.

The acquisitions of the smaller studios by conglomerate Hollywood was a plan in part to take over the independent film industry and at the same time start "independent" studios of their own. The following are all "indie" studios owned by conglomerate Hollywood:

- Sony Pictures Classics (1992–present)
- Searchlight Pictures (1994–present)
- Paramount Vantage (1998–2013)
  - Miramax (1979–present)
- Focus Features (2002–present)
- Warner Independent Pictures (2003–2008)
  - Fine Line Features (1991-2005)

By the early 2000s, Hollywood was producing three different classes of films: 1) big-budget blockbusters, 2) art films, specialty films and niche-market films produced by the conglomerate-owned "indies" and 3) genre and specialty films coming from true indie studios and producers. The third category comprised over half the features released in the United States and usually cost between $5 and $10 million to produce.

Hollywood was producing these three different classes of feature films by means of three different types of producers. The superior products were the large, budget blockbusters and high-cost star vehicles marketed by the six major studio producer-distributors. Budgets on the major studios' pictures averaged $100 million, with approximately one-third of it spent on marketing because of the large release campaigns. Another class of Hollywood feature film included art films, specialty films, and other niche-market fare controlled by the conglomerates' indie subsidiaries. Budgets on these indie films averaged $40 million per release in the early 2000s, with $10 million to $15 million spent on marketing (MPA, 2006:12). The final class of film consisted of genre and specialty films whose release campaigns were administered by independent producer-distributors with only a few dozen or possibly a few hundred screens in select urban markets. Films like these usually cost less than $10 million, but frequently less than $5 million, with small marketing budgets that escalate if and when a particular film performs.

== Internationally ==
The independent film industry exists globally. Many of the most prestigious film festivals are hosted in various cities around the world. The Berlin International Film Festival attracts over 130 countries, making it the largest film festival in the world. Other large events include the Toronto International Film Festival, Hong Kong International Film Festival, and the Panafrican Film and TV Festival of Ouagadougou.

The European Union, specifically through the European Cinema and VOD Initiative (ECVI), has established programs that attempt to adapt the film industry to an increasing digital demand for film on video on demand services, outside of theatrical screenings. With this program, VOD offerings are paired with traditional movie screenings. There is also more of a push from EU National governments to fund all aspects of the arts, including film. The European Commission for Culture has an Audiovisual sector, for example, whose role is most notably to help distribute and promote films and festivals across Europe. Additionally, the Commission organizes policymaking, research, and reporting on "media literacy" and "digital distribution."

== Technology and democratization ==
As with other media, the availability of new technologies has fueled the democratization of filmmaking and the growth of independent film. In the late forties and fifties, new inexpensive portable cameras made it easier for independent filmmakers to produce content without studio backing. The emergence of camcorders in the eighties broadened the pool of filmmakers experimenting with the newly available technology. More recently, the switch from film to digital cameras, inexpensive non-linear editing and the move to distribution via the internet have led to more people being able to make and exhibit movies of their own, including young people and individuals from marginalized communities. These people may have little to no formal technical or academic training, but instead are autodidactic filmmakers, using online sources to learn the craft. Aspiring filmmakers can range from those simply with access to a smartphone or digital camera, to those who write "spec" scripts (to pitch to studios), actively network, and use crowdsourcing and other financing to get their films professionally produced. Oftentimes, aspiring filmmakers have other day-jobs to support themselves financially while they pitch their scripts and ideas to independent film production companies, talent agents, and wealthy investors. This recent technology-fueled renaissance has helped fuel other supporting industries such as the "prosumer" camera segment and film schools for those who are less autodidactic. Film programs in universities such as NYU in New York and USC in Los Angeles have benefited from this transitional growth.

=== Crowdsourced funding ===
The economic side of filmmaking is also less of an obstacle than before, because the backing of a major studio is no longer needed to access necessary movie funding. Crowdfunding services like Kickstarter, Pozible, and Tubestart have helped people raise thousands of dollars; enough to fund their own, low-budget productions. As a result of the falling cost of technology to make, edit and digitally distribute films, filmmaking is more widely accessible than ever before.

Full-length films are often showcased at film festivals such as the Sundance Film Festival, Slamdance Film Festival, South by Southwest Festival, Raindance Film Festival, Telluride Film Festival, and Palm Springs Film Festival. Award winners from these exhibitions are more likely to get picked up for distribution by major film distributors. Film festivals and screenings like these are just one of the options in which movies can be independently produced/released.

=== Analog to digital ===
The development of independent film in the 1990s and 21st century has been stimulated by a range of technical innovations, including the development of affordable digital cinematography cameras that can exceed the quality of film and easy-to-use computer editing software. Until digital alternatives became available, the cost of professional film equipment and stock was a major obstacle to independent filmmakers who wanted to make their own films. Successful films such as The Blair Witch Project (which grossed over US$248.6 million while only spending US$60,000) have emerged from this new accessibility to filmmaking tools. In 2002, the cost of 35 mm film stock went up 23%, according to Variety. The advent of consumer camcorders in 1985, and more importantly, the arrival of digital video in the early 1990s, lowered the technology barrier to movie production. The personal computer and non-linear editing system have taken away the use of editing stands such as the KEM, dramatically reducing the costs of post-production, while technologies such as DVD, Blu-ray Disc and online video services have simplified distribution; video streaming services have made it possible to distribute a digital version of a film to an entire country or even the world, without involving shipping or warehousing of physical DVDs or film reels. 3-D technology is available to low-budget, independent filmmakers. By the second decade of the 21st century high-quality cellphone cameras allowed people to make, edit and distribute films on a single inexpensive device.

One of the examples of such a new indie approach to filmmaking is the 1999 Oscar-nominated documentary film Genghis Blues that was shot by the Belic brothers on two Hi8 consumer camcorders and won that year's Sundance Film Festival Audience Award for a Documentary. At the time, distribution was still film-based so the movie had to be "filmed out" from interlaced digital video format to film running at traditional 24-frame per second rate, so interlacing artefacts are noticeable at times. In 2004 Panasonic released the DVX100 camcorder, which featured film-like 24-frame per second shooting rate. This gave independent filmmakers the ability to shoot video at a frame rate considered standard for movies at the time and opened the possibility of clean digital frame to film frame conversion. Several acclaimed films were made with this camera, for example Iraq in Fragments. More recent devices allow "filming" at very high frame rates to facilitate distribution into a number of frame rates without artifacts.

Even though new cinema cameras such as the Arri Alexa, RED Epic, and the many new DSLRs cost thousands of dollars to purchase, independent films are still cheaper than ever, creating footage that looks like 35 mm film without the same high cost. These cameras also perform better than traditional film because of its ability to perform in extremely dark/low light situations relative to film. In 2008, Nikon released the first DSLR camera that could also shoot video, the Nikon D90. With the sensor larger than on a traditional camcorder, these DSLRs allow for a greater control over depth of field, great low-light capabilities, and a large variety of exchangeable lenses, including lenses from old film cameras – things which independent filmmakers have been longing for years. With the creation of new, light-weight and accessible cinema cameras, documentaries have also benefitted greatly. It was previously impossible to capture the extreme wild of mother nature because of the lack of maneuverability with film cameras; however, with the creation of DSLRs, documentary filmmakers were able to reach hard-to-get places in order to capture what they couldn't have with film cameras. Cameras have even been attached to animals to allow them to help film never-before-seen scenes.

New technologies have also allowed the development of new cinematic techniques originating in independent films, such as the development of the zoom lens in the early 20th century. The use of the (controversial) hand-held shot made popular in the groundbreaking The Blair Witch Project also led to an entirely new subgenre: the found-footage film.

Independent filmmaking has also benefited from the new editing software. Instead of needing a post-house to do the editing, independent film makers use a personal computer or even just a cellphone with editing software to edit their films. Editing software available include Avid Media Composer, Adobe Premiere Pro, Final Cut Pro, (Color Grading Software) DaVinci Resolve, and many more. There are also many free tutorials and courses available online to teach different post production skills needed to use these programs. These new technologies allow independent film makers to create films that are comparable to high-budget films. Computer-generated imaging (CGI) has also become more accessible, transitioning from a highly specialized process done by post-production companies into a task that can be performed by independent artists.

Francis Ford Coppola, long an advocate of new technologies like non-linear editing and digital cameras, said in 2007 that "cinema is escaping being controlled by the financier, and that's a wonderful thing. You don't have to go hat-in-hand to some film distributor and say, 'Please will you let me make a movie?'"

=== Camera phone filmmaking ===
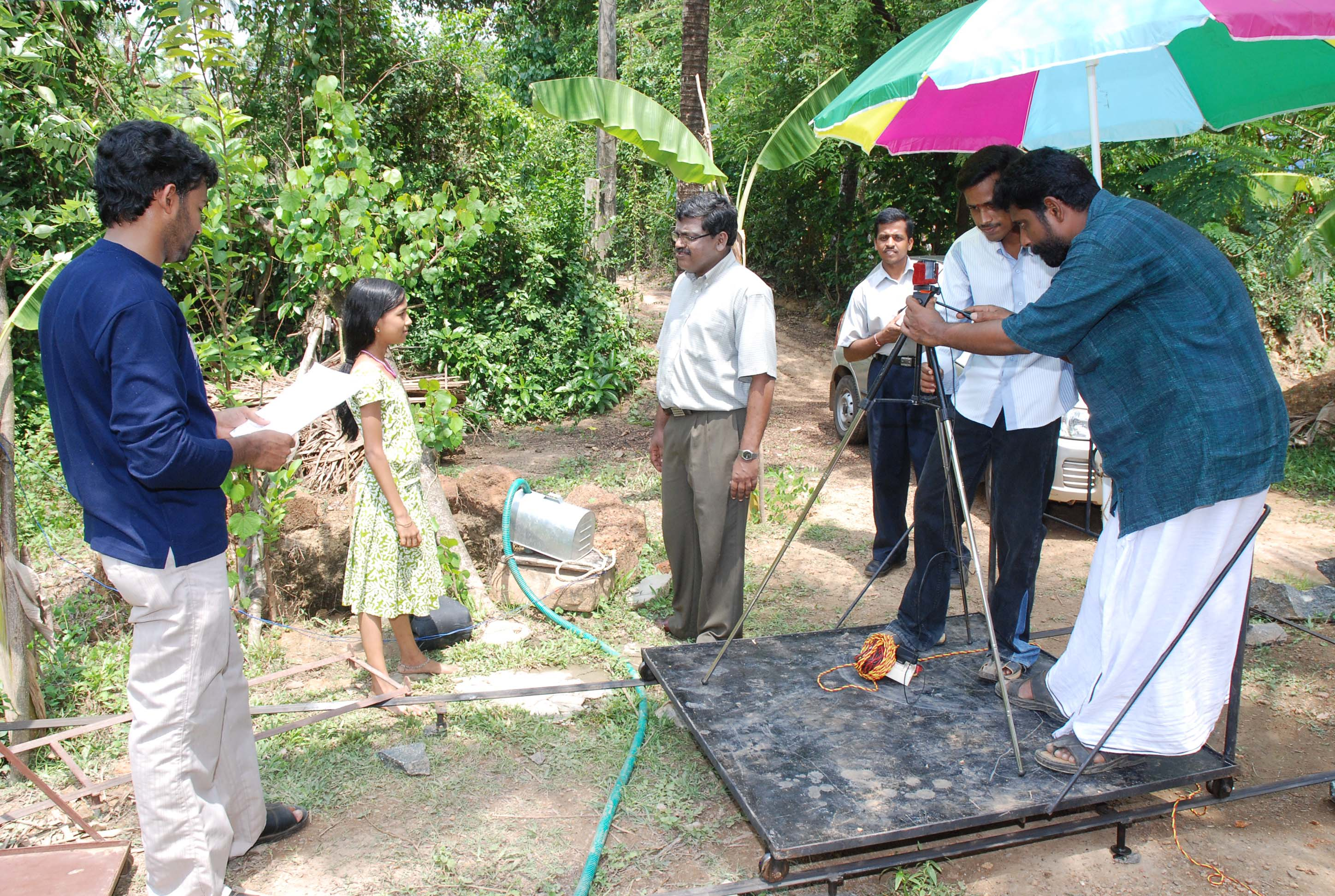
Shooting of Jalachhayam on Nokia N95 mobile phone

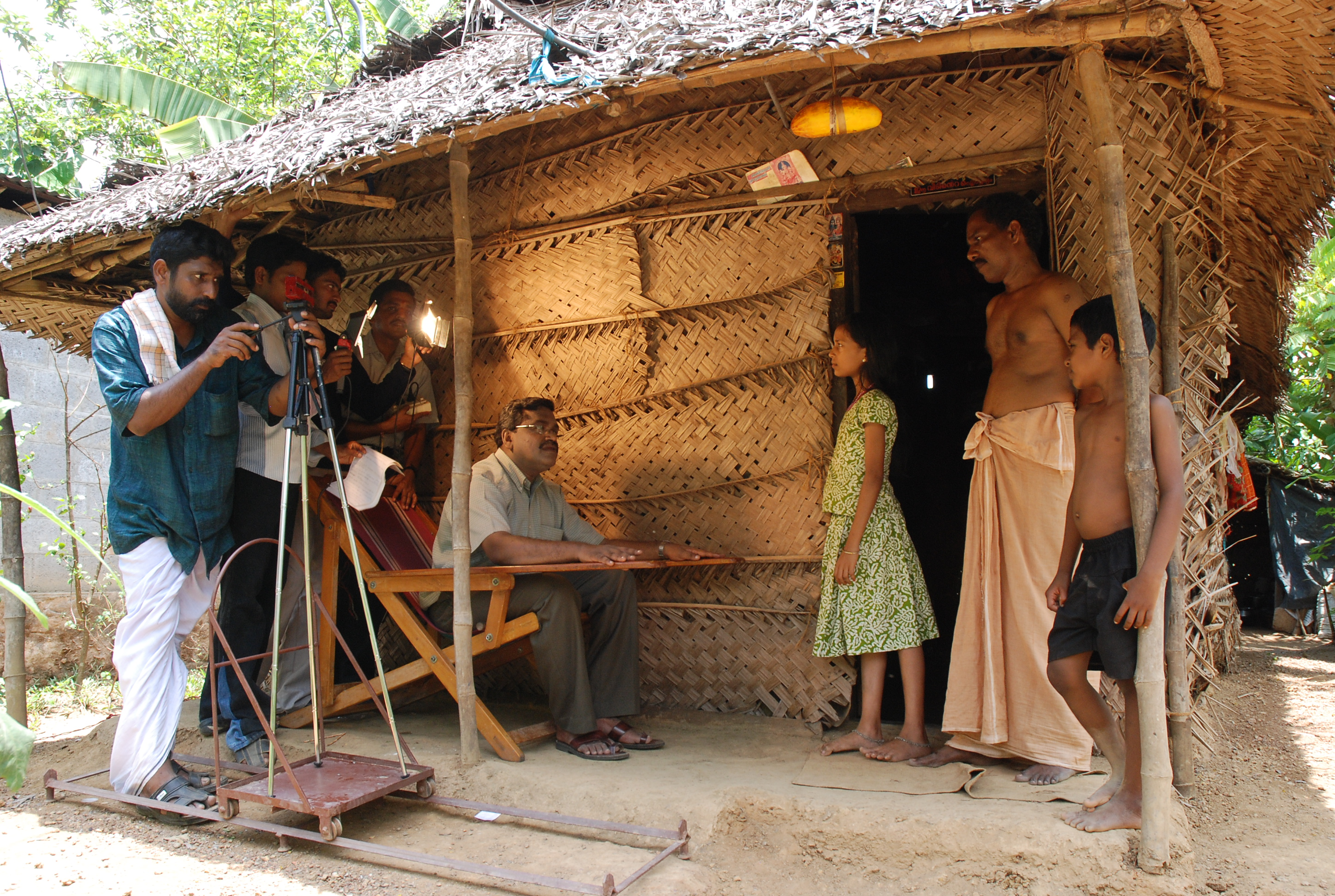
Shooting of Jalachhayam using Nokia N95 mobile phone

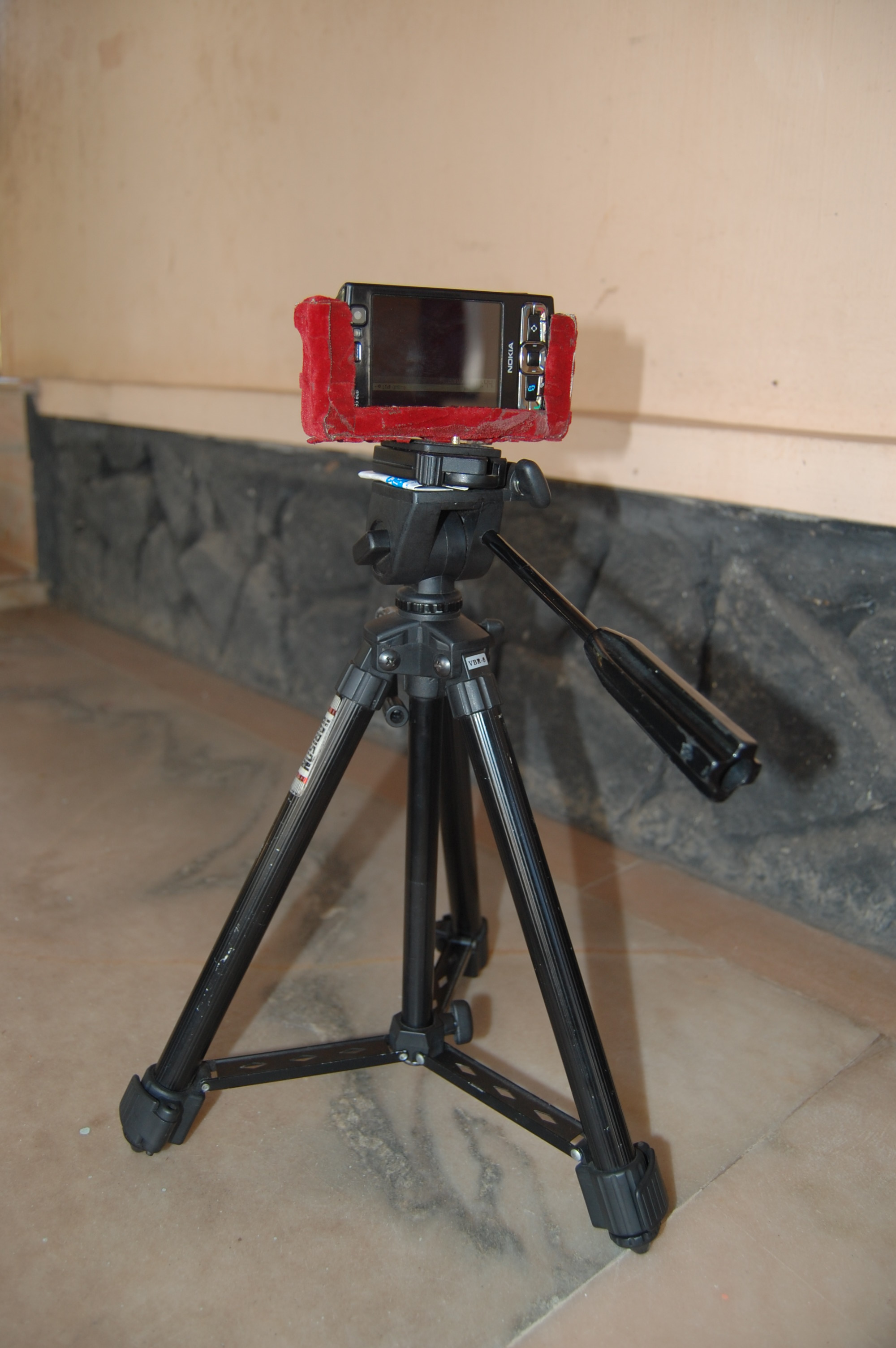
The Nokia N95 mobile phone on tripod which was used to shoot Jalachhayam, a mobile phone film

Nowadays, high pixel camera phones are widely using also for mainstream film cinematography. New Love Meetings, a documentary shot on the Nokia N90, directed by Barbara Seghezzi and Marcello Mencarini in 2005 from Italy; Why Didn't Anybody Tell Me It Would Become This Bad in Afghanistan, the first narrative feature film shot with a mobile phone, a Samsung, directed by Cyrus Frisch in 2007 from the Netherlands; SMS Sugar Man, a narrative film shot on the Sony Ericsson W900i, directed by Aryan Kaganof in 2008 from South Africa; Veenavaadanam, a documentary shot on Nokia N70, directed by Sathish Kalathil in 2008 from India; and Jalachhayam, a narrative film shot on the Nokia N95, directed by Sathish Kalathil in 2010 from India are the first noted experimental works with the first generation camera phones.

Hooked Up, To Jennifer, Tangerine, 9 Rides, Unsane, High Flying Bird, Ghost, Pondicherry, I WeirDo and Banger are some other examples shot on iPhones.

== See also ==
- British Independent Film Awards
- Independent Spirit Awards
- List of film festivals
- Outline of film
- Independent animation
- American Eccentric Cinema
- World cinema
- List of American independent films
- Indiewood
