= Documentary practice =

Process of creating documentary projects

Documentary practice is the process of creating documentary projects. It refers to what people do with media devices, content, form, and production strategies in order to address the creative, ethical, and conceptual problems and choices that arise as they make documentary films or other similar presentations based on fact or reality. Colleges and universities offer courses and programs in documentary practice (see External Links).

Traditional definitions put forth by scholars of documentary film address documentary practice in terms of formal codes, categories and conventions. These are used by filmmakers to create "non-fictional" representations of the historical world. Subsequent definitions made by others define various approaches to documentary in terms of how they use such rhetorical strategies as voice, structure and style. Such definitions focus on finished documentary projects and how they measure up to contemporary notions of truth and representation.

However, recent cultural, technological, stylistic, and social shifts have turned attention in documentary studies to the process of documenting as such. Documentary-makers and scholars alike are showing interest in the present moment and how new media tools can be used by documentary-makers to initiate formation of new communities, conversations, and ways of being together.

Such interests characterized conceptual art works of the 1960s and 1970s. The connective potentialities of art as a practice are currently being explored in the contemporary relational aesthetics movement. In these movements, the potentialities and dilemmas of aesthetic practice take precedence over traditional concerns with the finished artwork. Likewise, growing interest in documentary as a practice is opening the definition of documentary beyond considerations of finished documents, to include the act of documenting itself. This expansion of the definition of documentary work became possible when consumer-level video cameras became widely available. Some collectives of video producers used this new technology to address issues such as politics of cultural representation, the critique of daily life, the deconstruction of culture control mechanisms, and the subversion of authority.

While practices of documentary-makers continue to be informed by existing documentary traditions, conventions in documentary, and genres, they are also reshaped by emerging media environments, content, devices and uses for those devices. Emerging media, in turn, are greatly affected by their political, economic, and cultural contexts. Various emerging technologies and the situations in which they are used present documentary-makers with new challenges, opportunities, and dilemmas. This makes documentary practice dynamic and ever-evolving.

Many documentary-makers seek innovative approaches to their field in response to emerging technologies and the practices they make possible. Continuous innovation in documentary practice prevents the "documentary idea" from becoming stagnant or locked into any single generic form. This challenges each generation of documentary-makers and viewers to approach documentary-making as a living practice.

== Emerging media ==
New documentary practices associated with cinéma vérité and Direct Cinema began to appear in the mid-1950s when technological developments made film and then video more portable, accessible and affordable. This allowed more people to engage in the practice of documenting. The 1991 video of Rodney King being subjected to police restraint is an example of the continuing power of this shift. An ordinary citizen was able to capture the police brutality with his camcorder, transforming him from a witness to an amateur documentary filmmaker. Scholars have cited the events following the widespread dissemination of the Rodney King video as one of the earliest examples of "participatory culture."

Today's new media continue to reshape documentary practices in significant ways. Recording technologies embedded within personal portable devices such as video-equipped mobile phones and hand-held digital video and still cameras have made it possible for vast numbers of people to engage in citizen journalism and "documentary practices." Additionally, Web 2.0 platforms such as video and photo-sharing websites and blogs now enable amateur "documentarians" to share and collaborate on content in ways never before possible. A practice that Howard Rheingold and Justin Hall have labeled p2p Journalism, now exists at the blurred boundary where traditional definitions of journalism and documentary meet and influence each other.

Promises of new media technologies have raised expectations of a freer flow of ideas and content. Scholars are studying how participants in documenting practices engage in the social process of acquiring knowledge, sharing stories, and documenting events-in-the-making. Through such practices, social ties among people and groups as they arbitrate what qualifies as knowledge evolve continuously, facilitating the emergence of what Pierre Lévy refers to as collective intelligence.

By enabling more people to record and share their experiences, emerging media technologies have transformed the way people document reality and how they participate in the very events that they are documenting. Everyday life can become performative as people respond to encounters and events through documentary practices, creating records of daily life which they then share with others via the Internet. For many people, digital media-making becomes a form of documentary practice when the results are created for and shared via social-networking sites like MySpace, Flickr and Facebook.

The 2006 documentary of a Beastie Boys concert, Awesome; I F***n' Shot That!, directed by Adam Yauch, is an example of how participation in documentary practices transforms the way people take part in events such as concerts. A live performance in 2004 was documented by 50 fans who were all given Hi8 cameras and told to film their experience of the concert. Their footage was later edited together with professionally shot footage. It provided contrasting points of view and established dialogue between artists and fans.

Some scholars argue that as an increasingly widespread practice, the nascent cellphone documentary genre creates more possibilities and forms of social agency; people use cell phones to document public events and network their collective responses; others have used their phones to mobilize crowds during public demonstrations.

== Mobile communications devices ==
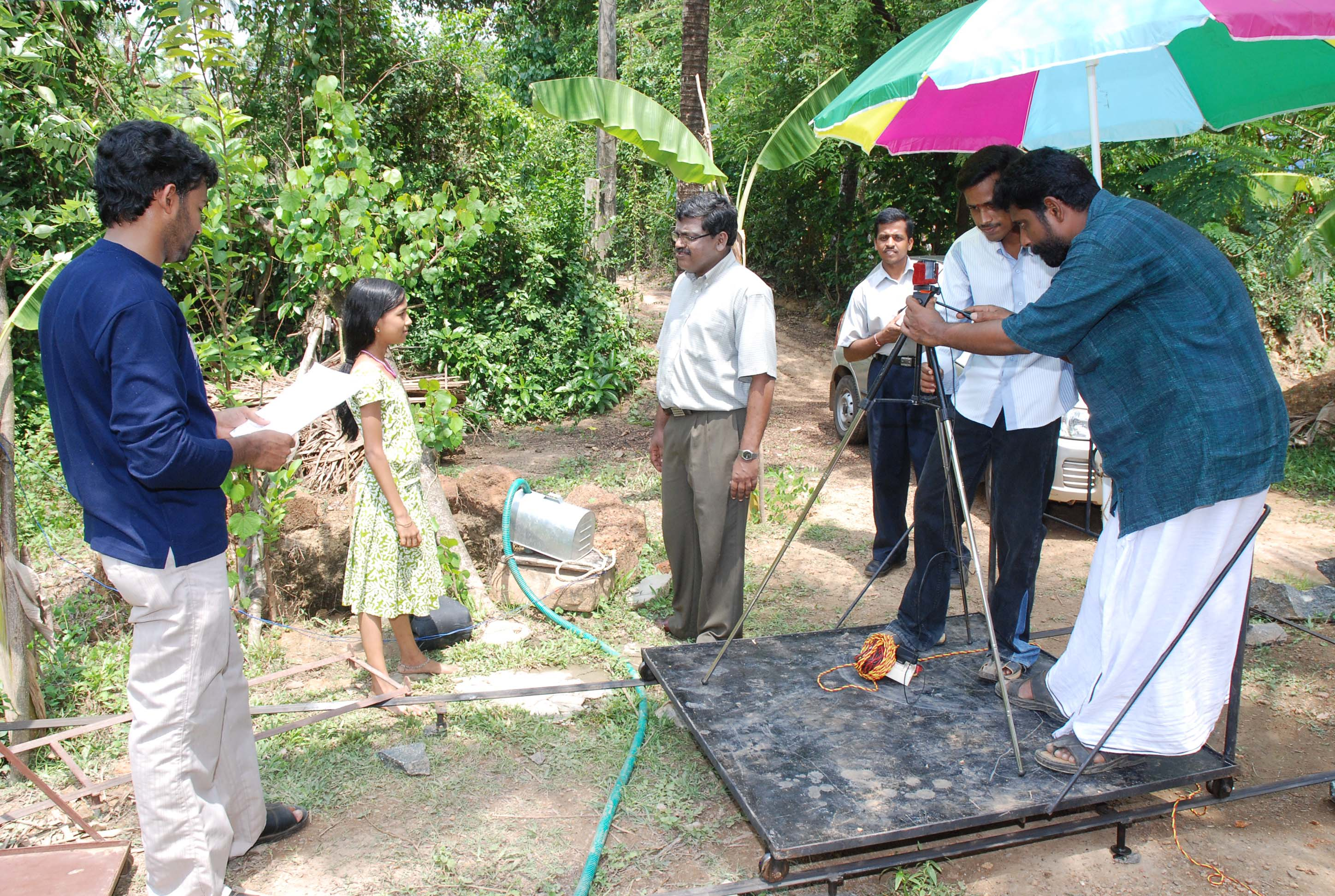
Shooting of Jalachhayam on Nokia N95 mobile phone

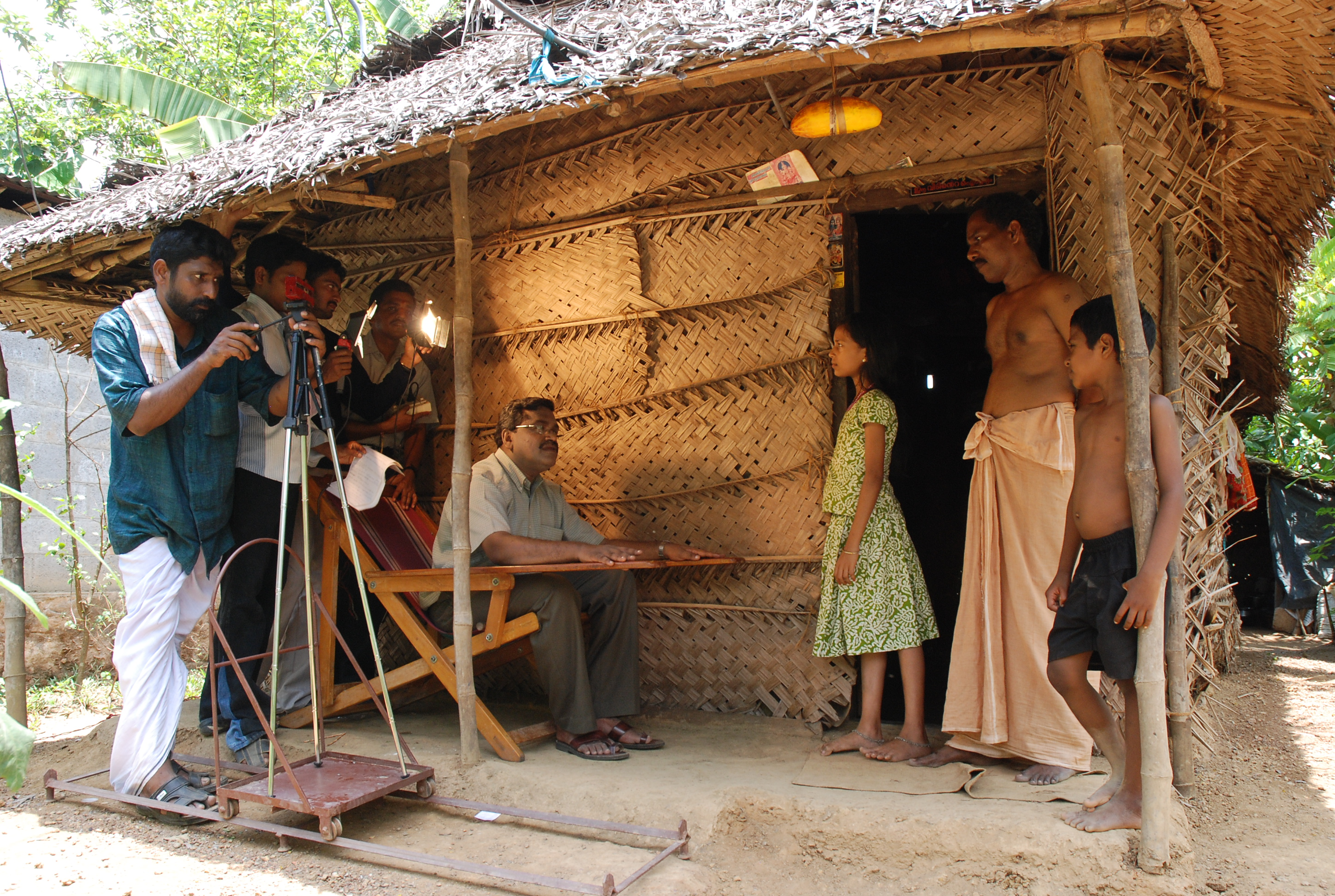
Shooting of Jalachhayam using Nokia N95 mobile phone

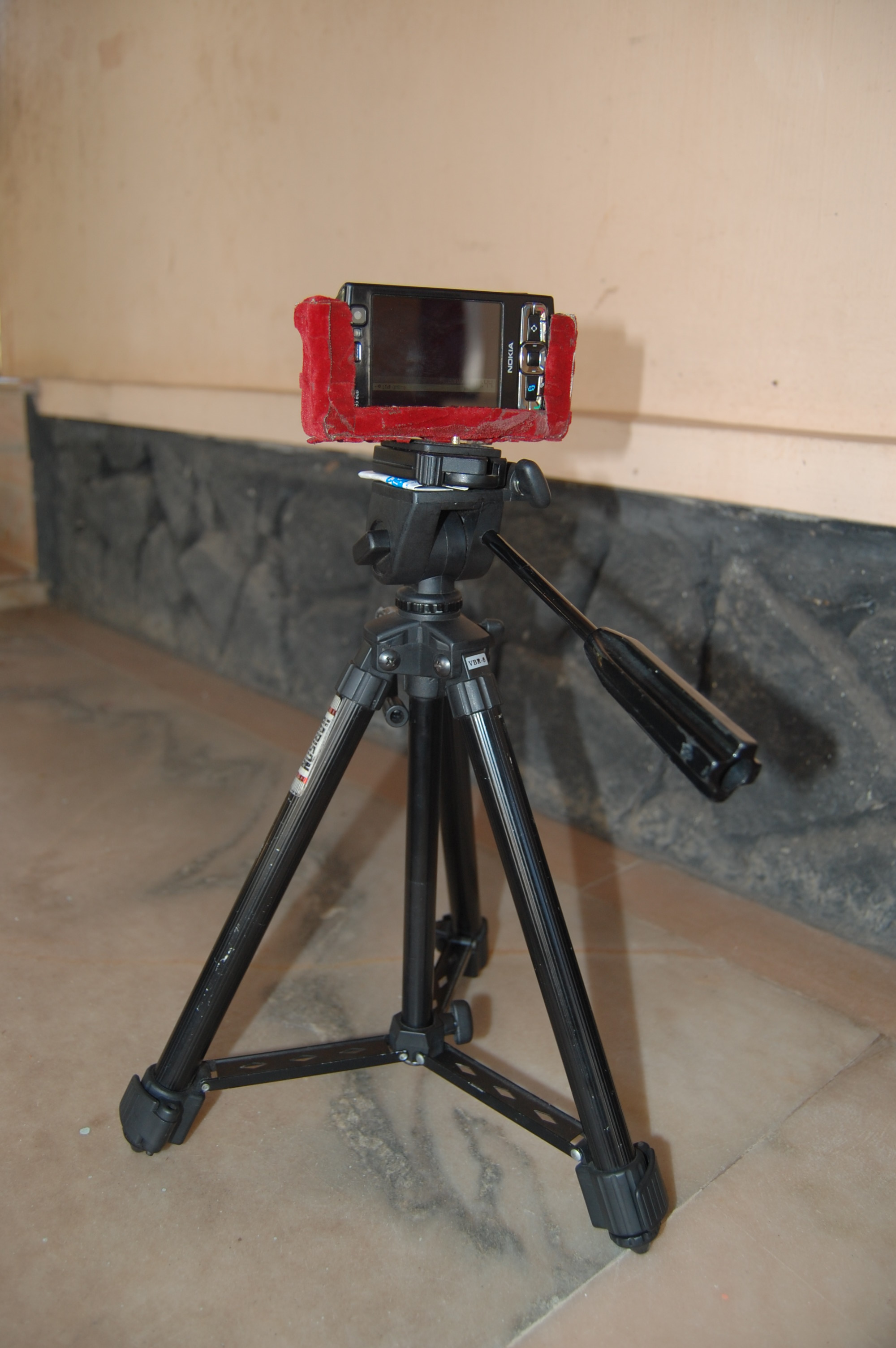
The Nokia N95 mobile phone on tripod which was used to shoot Jalachhayam mobile phone film

The pursuit of "filmic truth" has been a hallmark of documentary practice since early film-makers such as the Lumiere Brothers, Robert Flaherty and Dziga Vertov created its foundations. (see External Links)

Today, people use mobile devices in ways that open new possibilities for the practices of documenting—especially those practices involved in efforts to achieve "filmic truth." For example, in June 2006 a 93-minute remake of Pier Paolo Pasolini's documentary entitled Love Meetings (1965), in which he interviewed Italian citizens about their views on sex in postwar Italy, was shot entirely on a cell phone by it:Marcello Mencarini and Barbara Seghezzi. Entitled New Love Meetings, the remake was filmed in MPEG4 format using a Nokia N90. It is the first feature-length movie to be shot entirely on a mobile phone. Their premise was that even though they asked their subjects the same questions that Pasolini had posed, the results of their documentary would be clearly influenced by the medium they used to capture the images. They believed that the use of a cellphone, an instrument of daily life, produced an intimacy absent in Pasolini's movie, making people more spontaneous and open, creating a dialogue more like a chat than an interview. They propose that the line between subject and observer becomes thinner through such practices, as the documentary film-makers present themselves as "normal people" using their cell phones to preserve an instant. New Love Meetings is a prime example of how a specific emerging technology, the mobile phone, is shifting documentary practice today. (see External Links)

In the modern era, many filmmakers utilize the mobile phone's advantages. After the launching of New Love Meetings, a docufiction was made in Dutch named Why Didn't Anybody Tell Me It Would Become This Bad in Afghanistan directed by Cyrus Frisch in 2007. In 2008, a Narrative film, SMS Sugar Man came out by Aryan Kaganof from South Africa. Also in 2008, in India, Veenavaadanam released, directed by Sathish Kalathil in Malayalam. Again in 2010, Sathish Kalathil launched an experimental film, Jalachhayam in Malayalam. It was also a theatrical release. Nowadays, beside documentaries, several narrative films, captured by mobile phone cameras are also released. Many of these are theatrical release. Hooked Up, To Jennifer, Tangerine, 9 Rides, Searching, Unsane, High Flying Bird, I WeirDo are some examples of narrative films, captured by camera phones.

The use of the so-called "fourth screen" (the first screen being cinema, the second television, the third the computer, the fourth the mobile device) as a documentary tool has become a subject of academic study. In fall of 2007, graduate students of The New School produced an experimental five-minute metadocumentary shot with three cell phones. It explored the possibilities of mobile media devices as a medium for documentary practice by using them to restate Dziga Vertov's perspectives on filmic truth as expressed in his film: Man with a Movie Camera.

=== See also ===
- List of Mobile phone films

== Surveillance media ==
Surveillance is the act of observation or monitoring, usually of places, people, and activity, and typically without the subject's knowledge. Much of contemporary surveillance involves observation from a distance with the help of electronic devices, such as telephone tapping, directional microphones, covert listening devices or "bugs", subminiature cameras, closed-circuit television, GPS (Global Positioning System) tracking, electronic tagging, motion tracking, satellites, internet and computer surveillance.

Historically, surveillance has often been associated with governmental and other large organizational security practices. However, artists and activists have challenged those conventional practices. An early example is the film Empire, made by artist Andy Warhol in 1964. It consisted of an extreme long shot of the Empire State Building, held for eight hours in real time, challenging the boundaries of surveillance and watchability. More recently, scholars such as UCLA cinema professor Steve Mamber, have turned attention to the growing trend of using inexpensive, small cameras to unobtrusively record events of daily life. To examine hidden-camera video practices, in 2003 Mamber asked acquaintances if they or anyone they knew might have access to such footage, creating an online archive of the footage. Mamber described the growing practice as "both a widely pervasive activity and an oddly unexamined one." In response, he established the UCLA Center for Hidden Camera Research, another example of how emerging technologies are shifting documentary practice. (see External Links)

Another practice that has emerged from the introduction of new surveillance technologies is "inverse surveillance", also known as Sousveillance. Launched in 2004, CARPE (Capture, Archival and Retrieval of Personal Experiences)is a project conceived with the idea of recording and archiving one's whole life. Some of the technologies developed within this project have become potential new tools of documentary practice. For example, the EyeTap, developed by University of Toronto Professor Steve Mann, presents itself as an ideal device for continuous and inconspicuous recording as well as inverse surveillance.

Some scholars assert that these new devices enable us to imagine a new form of citizenship (the "monitorial citizen") that hinges on documentary practices. This concept is illustrated by parents watching their small children at the community pool. They look inactive, but they are poised for action if action is required. The emphasis is not so much on information gathering as it is on keeping a watchful eye—even while the monitorial citizen is doing something else.

Projects such as The Canary Project's photographic monitoring of global warming effects (see External Links) and the Center for Land Use Interpretation's Data Base of citizen-created documentation of land use practices exemplify the link between surveillance, emerging documentary practices and monitorial citizenship.

The American Association for the Advancement of Science, in partnership with Amnesty International, presents another example of how new media are allowing surveillance and documentary practices to inform each other. This partnership uses satellite imagery to help NGOs document atrocities in isolated crisis zones such as Darfur and Zimbabwe. By purchasing images from commercial satellites that correspond to mapping coordinates, NGOs are increasingly able to provide visual evidence of refugee camps and burned villages; events and activities that would be impossible to image without the satellite technology. (see External Links)

== Mapping applications ==
Traditionally, maps have been created to orient people. They have delineated boundaries by using static, two-dimensional symbols to represent dynamic, three-dimensional spaces that undergo continual change. Both form and content are fixed in these traditional maps, leaving out the real-time experiences of those people who live in and define the space being represented. However, the proliferation of portable media devices that can record and distribute digital images, video, audio and text, combined with the capability to reach previously unreachable audiences via the Web and through vast wireless networks, now makes it possible to transform conventional maps into living documents.

New, map-based documentary practices employ maps as useful tools for interrogating the present, transforming maps from static representations into events-in-the-making. Personal narratives, experiences, and memories are being used to create maps that represent social and cultural space as well as physical space. Often, the goal in such projects is to evoke a more diverse and dynamic portrait of human experience as it is actually lived. (see External Links)

For example, programs that involve community members and youth in active community mapping for social empowerment include Amigos de las Américas, Video Machete in Chicago, as well as Community Youth Mapping and Mapping Within (see External Links). There have been significant efforts to use community mapping practices to promote environmentally sound practices, including Green Mapping (see External Link) which involves locals in identifying and siting (on a map) ecology-minded ("green") businesses, spaces, and organizations. A recent California effort involves citizens in mapping forest fires and related community action plan. A variety of resources are available to support those involved in mapping, including resource lists, guidelines, and lesson plans. (see External Links)

Sonic representations of place, sometimes called "soundmaps," challenge traditional assumptions of what maps can do and offer new ways of participating in documentary practice. Soundmaps extend opportunities for defining place and expressing local culture, and they offer the added dimension of time. By enabling the integration of sound, text, still and moving images, mapping uniquely allows for more choices of representation and documentation without necessarily privileging one form above the rest. By doing so, voice is given to more ways of knowing and expressing—including 'remixing', for example—in a way that recognizes and affirms the diversity of experiences and representations within communities. (see External Links)

The emergence of the Geoweb is another example of how changes in the ways people document geographical space is also broadening notions of documentary practice. Geoweb refers to virtual maps or "geobrowsers" such as Google Earth that allow users to search for images, texts, videos or other media content through interactive, photographic maps of the earth. All information on a geoweb is organized by geographic tags tied to a particular location on the map. Since its inception, usage of the Geoweb has been widespread and varied; including recreational, humanitarian, political and military uses. (see External Links) New mapping technologies make new documentary practices imaginable by allowing documentary producers to locate, store, share, and network images and information that capture the ever-shifting landscapes of the world, updated in real-time.

On the global scale, access to new media with potential to generate new documentary practices is still confined to an economically privileged few, giving rise to the digital divide. However, the first digital divide was largely due to economics and politics of broadband cable and expensive computers needed to access the internet. With the proliferation of wireless networks and mobile phones, the divide has diminished considerably, as more remote areas are easier to reach through wireless signals and mobile devices are far less expensive than computers. While there is great potential for new technologies to continue to broaden definitions of documentary practice, enabling more people to collaborate and “document from within” their own communities, questions about who controls and regulates the networks and distribution methods as well as the increasingly advanced skill needed to fully participate in emerging practices will likely be a core question for some time.
