= Hooked Up =

Hooked Up may refer to:

- Hooked Up (film), a 2013 Spanish horror film
- Hooked Up (TV series), a 2004 reality television series
