= List of films shot on mobile phones =

This is a list of feature films shot entirely on camera phones. The list includes only films referenced in Wikipedia articles.

Film	Director	Country	Year	Category	Camera phone
New Love Meetings	Barbara Seghezzi; Marcello Mencarini	Italy	2005	Documentary film	Nokia N90
Why Didn't Anybody Tell Me It Would Become This Bad in Afghanistan	Cyrus Frisch	Netherlands	2007	Narrative film	Samsung Sharp 902 and 903
SMS Sugar Man	Aryan Kaganof	South Africa	2008	Narrative film	Sony Ericsson W900i
Veenavaadanam	Sathish Kalathil	India	2008	Documentary film	Nokia N70
Jalachhayam	Sathish Kalathil	India	2010	Narrative film	Nokia N95
Night Fishing	Park Chan-wook	South Korea	2011	Short film	iPhone 4
A Cell Phone Movie	Nedzad Begovic	Bosnia	2011	Documentary film	LG Viewty
Olive	Patrick Gilles; Hooman Khalili	United States	2011	Narrative film	Nokia N8
King Kelly	Andrew Neel	United States	2012	Narrative film	iPhone 4
Hooked Up	Pablo Larcuen	Spain	2013	Narrative film	iPhone 4s
To Jennifer	James Cullen Bressack	United States	2013	Narrative film	iPhone 5
60ml: Last Order	Krishna Murali	India	2014	Short film	Nokia Lumia
Tangerine	Sean Baker	United States	2015	Narrative film	iPhone 5s
9 Rides	Matthew A. Cherry	United States	2015	Narrative film	iPhone 6s
Snowbird	Sean Baker	United States	2016	Short film	iPhone 6s, iPhone 6s Plus
Sleep Has Her House	Scott Barley	United Kingdom	2017	Narrative film	iPhone 6
Sin vagina, me marginan	Wesley Verástegui	Peru	2017	Narrative film	iPhone 6
Unsane	Steven Soderbergh	United States	2018	Narrative film	iPhone 7 Plus
High Flying Bird	Steven Soderbergh	United States	2019	Narrative film	iPhone 8
Midnight Traveler	Hassan Fazili	United States; Qatar; Canada; United Kingdom	2019	Documentary film	Three different Samsung phones
Ghost	Anthony Z. James	United Kingdom	2020	Narrative film	iPhone 8
I WeirDo	Liao Ming-yi	Taiwan	2020	Narrative film	iPhone XS Max
Pondicherry	Sachin Kundalkar	India	2022	Narrative film	iPhone X
Very Nice Day	Patrice Laliberté	Canada	2022	Narrative film	Google Pixel 2
Banger	Adam Sedlák	Czech Republic	2022	Narrative film	iPhone 12 Pro Max
Desconocidas (Unknowns)	Luis Fernández		2022	Narrative film	iPhone 14 Pro Max
The Astrid Experience	Cal Barnes	United States	2023	Narrative film	iPhone 8 Plus
Fursat	Vishal Bhardwaj	India	2023	Short film	iPhone 14 Pro
A Place Under the Sun	Jason Lopchan	Nepal	2024	Narrative film	iPhone 14 Pro Max
Motherboard	Victoria Mapplebeck	UK	2024	Documentary film	Shot over 15 years on 5 generations of iPhone
Midnight	Takashi Miike	Japan	2024	Short film	iPhone 15 Pro
Kontinental '25	Radu Jude	Romania Brazil Switzerland United Kingdom Luxembourg	2025	Narrative film	iPhone 15
28 Years Later	Danny Boyle	United Kingdom; United States	2025	Narrative film	iPhone 15 Pro Max
Left-Handed Girl	Shih-Ching Tsou	United Kingdom; United States; France; Taiwan	2025	Narrative film	iPhone 13

== See also ==
- Documentary practice
- SmartFone FlickFest, a film festival for films made on smartphones, based in Sydney
