= Non-fiction =

Type of genre, true work

Non-fiction (or nonfiction) is any document or media content that attempts, in good faith, to convey information only about the real world, rather than being grounded in imagination. Non-fiction typically aims to present topics objectively based on historical, scientific, and empirical information. However, some non-fiction ranges into more subjective territory, including sincerely held opinions on real-world topics.

Often referring specifically to prose writing, non-fiction is one of the two fundamental approaches to story and storytelling, in contrast to narrative fiction, which is largely populated by imaginary characters and events. Non-fiction writers can show the reasons and consequences of events, they can compare, contrast, classify, categorise and summarise information, put the facts in a logical or chronological order, infer and reach conclusions about facts, etc. They can use graphic, structural and printed appearance features such as pictures, graphs or charts, diagrams, flowcharts, summaries, glossaries, sidebars, timelines, table of contents, headings, subheadings, bolded or italicised words, footnotes, maps, indices, labels, captions, etc. to help readers find information.

While specific claims in a non-fiction work may prove inaccurate, the sincere author aims to be truthful at the time of composition. A non-fiction account seeks to accurately represent a topic, and might not imply any endorsement.

== Descriptions ==
The numerous narrative techniques used within fiction are generally thought inappropriate for use in non-fiction. They are still present particularly in older works, but are often muted so as not to overshadow the information within the work. Simplicity, clarity, and directness are some of the most important considerations when producing non-fiction. Audience is important in any artistic or descriptive endeavour, but it is perhaps most important in non-fiction. In fiction, the writer believes that readers will make an effort to follow and interpret an indirectly or abstractly presented progression of theme, whereas the production of non-fiction has more to do with the direct provision of information. Understanding of the potential readers' use for the work and their existing knowledge of a subject are both fundamental for effective non-fiction. Despite the claim to truth of non-fiction, it is often necessary to persuade the reader to agree with the ideas and so a balanced, coherent, and informed argument is vital. However, the boundaries between fiction and non-fiction are continually blurred and argued upon, especially in the field of biography; as Virginia Woolf said: "if we think of truth as something of granite-like solidity and of personality as something of rainbow-like intangibility and reflect that the aim of biography is to weld these two into one seamless whole, we shall admit that the problem is a stiff one and that we need not wonder if biographers, for the most part failed to solve it."

Including information that the author knows to be untrue within such works is usually regarded as dishonest. Still, certain kinds of written works can legitimately be either fiction or non-fiction, such as journals of self-expression, letters, magazine articles, and other expressions of imagination. Though they are mostly either one or the other, a blend of both is also possible. Some fiction may include non-fictional elements; semi-fiction is fiction implementing a great deal of non-fiction, (such as a fictional description based on a true story). Some non-fiction may include elements of unverified supposition, deduction, or imagination for the purpose of smoothing out a narrative, but the inclusion of open falsehoods would discredit it as a work of non-fiction. The publishing and bookselling businesses sometimes use the term "creative nonfiction" to distinguish works with a more literary or intellectual bent, as opposed to the bulk of non-fiction subjects.

== Types ==
Based on the author's intention or the purpose of the content, the main genres of non-fiction are instructional, explanatory, discussion-based, report-based (non-chronological), opinion-based (persuasive) and relating (chronological recounting) non-fiction. Non-fictional works of these different genres can be created with the help of a range of structures or formats such as:

- Academic texts, including scholarly papers, scientific papers, monographs, scientific journals, treatises, edited volumes, and conference proceedings.
- History books that document and discuss events that have taken place.
- Life writings, which include autobiographies, biographies, confessions, diaries, logs, memoirs, epistles, letters, postcards, letter collections, epitaphs, and obituaries.
- Literary criticism (including book reports and book reviews), art criticism, and film criticism.
- News stories, editorials, letters to the editor, opinion pieces, manifestos, notices (announcements), documentary films, and factual television.
- Persuasive writing (apologias and polemics), essays and essay collections, and promotional writing (including brochures, pamphlets, press releases, advertorials).
- Reference works, which include almanacs, encyclopaedias, atlases, bibliographies, chronicles, consumer reports, dictionaries, thesauri, business or telephone directories, handbooks, yearbooks, and books of quotations.
- Self-help books, popular science books, blogs, presentations, orations, and sayings.
- Textbooks, study guides, field guides, travelogues, recipes, owner's manuals, and user guides.

Common literary examples of non-fiction include expository, argumentative, functional, and opinion pieces; essays on art or literature; biographies; memoirs; journalism; and historical, scientific, technical, or economic writings (including electronic ones).

== See also ==
- Documentary practice
- List of writing genres
- Category:Non-fiction literary awards
