= Ghost (2020 film) =

British independent crime drama film

- Poster
- Directed by: Anthony Z. James
- Written by: Anthony Z James
- Produced by: Anthony Z. James; Domas Vilcinskas
- Starring: Anthony Mark Streeter; Nathan Hamilton; Russell Barnett
- Cinematography: Anthony Z. James
- Music by: Nikolaj Polujanov
- Production company: Story Image
- Release date: February 20, 2020
- Running time: 85 minutes
- Country: United Kingdom
- Language: English

Ghost of My Father (initially released as Ghost) is a 2020 British independent film written and directed by Anthony Zygavicius James as his debut feature. It is set in contemporary London and follows an ex-con's struggles to reconnect with his estranged son during his first day of freedom. The film was shot entirely on an iPhone 8.

It was first released on Amazon Prime on 20 February 2020 in the UK, later followed by a wider worldwide release. The film received critical acclaim for performances and cinematography.

== Premise ==
On the first day of freedom, a grizzled ex-con must reconnect with his troubled son before his violent past catches up with them.

== Cast ==
- Anthony Mark Streeter as Tony Ward
- Nathan Hamilton as Conor Ward
- Russell Barnett as Dominic Clarke
- Emmy Happisburgh as Valerie Ward
- Severija Bielskyte as Kat Hansen
- Jamie O'Neill as Alex Chamberlain

== Production ==
=== Development ===
In an interview with Mobile Motion Film Festival, Anthony Z. James revealed that the recent passing of his own father was the key inspiration to make the film: "Since losing my father a few years ago I was compelled to tell a story about my relationship with him through the lens of a gritty crime drama, the kind of movie he loved the most." Initially, he made a short film, called Day One, in 2018 about the first day out of prison, which also starred Streeter in the lead role. Impressed by his performance, James decided to develop a feature.

=== Filming ===
Principal photography for Ghost took place in London over a period of two weeks in February 2018, using two iPhone 8 smartphones with FiLMiC Pro app, Moondog Labs anamorphic adapters and a DJI Osmo gimbal. Inspired by John Cassavetes, James followed the DIY guerrilla filmmaking style and improvisation-based Mumblecore tradition, describing the process as "extremely collaborative and creatively liberating".

=== Post-production ===
James used free DaVinci Resolve software to edit and colour-correct the film. The movie features original soundtrack composed by Nikolai Polujanov AKA Vejopatis.

== Release ==
Ghost was set for a limited theatrical release in the United Kingdom, which was halted by the COVID-19 pandemic. It was released on Amazon Prime on 20 February 2020 in the UK, on 2 July 2020 in the United States and 16 July 2021 in Germany. In March 2021, it came out worldwide on Apple TV, Roku, Fire TV, Android TV, Vimeo On Demand and Plex, where it is available to watch for free.

== Reception ==
Ghost received positive reviews from the critics, highlighting performances and cinematography. On the review aggregator Rotten Tomatoes, Ghost holds a 100% "fresh" rating based on 6 reviews. Alan Ng of Film Threat called it "a fantastic piece of independent filmmaking". Rich Cline of Online Film Critics Society wrote: "Artfully shot on an iPhone, this low-key drama is an original variation of the British crime movie. Filmmaker Anthony Z. James lets the story unfold in thoughtful scenes that catch details and moods. [...] the camera gets into the heads of people who aren't good at sharing their feelings." Michael Bibbins of FanSided noted that "Ghost has some of the best camerawork of any movie shot on an iPhone".

According to Dempsey Pillot of CRP Writes: "Ghost is a surprisingly grounded film about redemption, and a quiet meditation about growing up and letting go", while Sam Comrie of JumpCut Online called Ghost "a truly gorgeous testament to the power of mobile filmmaking, with Anthony Z. James demonstrating his flare for creating beautiful moments with a minimalist setup".

== See also ==
List of films shot on mobile phones
