= 60ml: Last Order =

- Directed by: Krishna Murali
- Written by: Krishna Murali
- Produced by: Ganesh Vishwambharan, Rajesh Mathew
- Starring: Larish
- Cinematography: Suraj Khan
- Edited by: Alby Nataraj
- Production company: Lifecliks Productions
- Release date: 11 June 2014
- Running time: 6 minutes
- Country: India
- Language: Malayalam

60ml: Last Order is a 2014 Indian Malayalam-language short film about alcoholism, written and directed by Krishna Murali. This film was shot entirely on a Camera phone, Nokia Lumia and published on YouTube in June 2014. A major portion of this film was shot in Thiruvananthapuram.

== Plot ==
The film begins with a quote from F. Scott Fitzgerald. It revolves around Thomas (Larish), a man whose alcoholism eventually destroys his life. 15 years ago, he was introduced to alcohol by his friends for getting a girlfriend. In college, he skips class to go drinking. After he graduates, he refuses to find a job, choosing to keep drinking instead. When his girlfriend breaks up with him, he begins to drink even more, eventually finding that he has forgotten and lost all the skills and talent he once possessed. The film ends with Larish aimlessly slumped over a table.

== See also ==
- List of films shot on mobile phones
