= Fourth screen =

Advertising concept

In advertising and marketing communication, fourth screen, or sometimes third screen, refers to a small portable video screen such as a mobile phone or portable media player.

Today, people use mobile devices in ways that open new possibilities for documentary practice.

== History ==
The term fourth screen originates in reference to the actual historical sequence in the development of video screens. With the rapid proliferation of video networks in non-traditional spots such as movie theaters, bars and restaurants, gas stations, health clubs, and other place-based venues a category entitled "fourth screen" was created. The first three screens are considered: TV, Internet, and Mobile. The fourth screen is mainly used in the advertising and media space with the explanation and use of digital signage. With the proliferation of technology, digital signage has expanded in this "fourth screen" section to include movie theaters, gas stations and health clubs. One of the leading digital signage companies in movie theaters is Screenvision, with over 14,400 screens in the US. Other leaders in the "fourth screen" marketplace are Gas Station TV and Zephyr Media Inc; GSTV generates over 32 million digital signage impressions every month and Zephyr Media Inc on their US Army Network over 25 million digital signage impressions a month. In a recent Nielsen "Fourth Screen" Market report, Nielsen identifies that the digital screens in the "fourth screen" category generated over 237 million monthly exposures to persons 18+years or older. They go on to outline the various companies that are leaders in the space that include screenvision, NCM, Capitvate, GSTV and IndoorDirect. Nielsen's "Fourth Screen Network Audience Report" enables direct comparisons between digital place-based video networks and other video networks, including TV and Internet.

The video screens again are:

1. television (TV)
2. personal computer (PC), or Internet
3. mobile telephone screens
4. out of home digital signage.
