= Why Didn't Anybody Tell Me It Would Become This Bad in Afghanistan =

Waarom heeft niemand mij verteld dat het zo erg zou worden in Afghanistan
- Original Dutch DVD cover
- Directed by: Cyrus Frisch
- Written by: Cyrus Frisch
- Produced by: Cyrus Frisch
- Starring: Cyrus Frisch
- Cinematography: Cyrus Frisch
- Edited by: Cyrus Frisch
- Release date: April 25, 2007
- Running time: 70 minutes
- Country: Netherlands
- Language: Dutch

Why Didn't Anybody Tell Me It Would Become This Bad in Afghanistan (Dutch: Waarom heeft niemand mij verteld dat het zo erg zou worden in Afghanistan) is the first narrative feature film shot with a mobile phone, directed by Cyrus Frisch. As a recording device, Frisch used the Samsung Sharp 902 and Sharp 903 Camera phones resolution with two Megapixels. The protagonist of Why Didn't Anybody, an Afghanistan veteran played by Frisch himself, films everyday images on his cell phone while he himself slowly loses his mind.

The film premiered at major film festivals: the International Film Festival Rotterdam 2007 (WP), Tribeca Film Festival 2007 (IP), the San Francisco International Film Festival 2007, Pesaro 2007, and many others.

It was mostly filmed in the Netherlands.

== See also ==
- Cyrus Frisch
- List of films shot on mobile phones
- World cinema
- No-budget film
- Camera phone
- Independent film
- Low-budget film
