= Mobile Motion Film Festival =

The Mobile Motion Film Festival is a film festival for films shot on mobile phones, based in Switzerland.

The festival was founded in 2014 by Andrea Holle with money raised via kickstarter.com. To be selected for the festival, films must have been shot using smartphones or other mobile devices.

== See also ==
- SmartFone Flick Fest, a smartphone film festival in Sydney, Australia
