= High Flying Bird =

2019 film by Steven Soderbergh

- Official poster
- Directed by: Steven Soderbergh
- Written by: Tarell Alvin McCraney
- Produced by: Joseph Malloch
- Starring: André Holland; Zazie Beetz; Melvin Gregg; Sonja Sohn; Zachary Quinto; Kyle MacLachlan; Bill Duke
- Cinematography: Peter Andrews
- Edited by: Mary Ann Bernard
- Music by: David Wilder Savage
- Production companies: Extension 765; Harper Road Films
- Distributed by: Netflix
- Release dates: January 27, 2019 (Slamdance); February 8, 2019 (United States)
- Running time: 91 minutes
- Country: United States
- Language: English
- Budget: $2 million

High Flying Bird is a 2019 American sports drama film directed by Steven Soderbergh, from a story suggested by André Holland, with the screenplay by Tarell Alvin McCraney. The film stars Holland, Zazie Beetz, Melvin Gregg, Sonja Sohn, Zachary Quinto, Glenn Fleshler, Jeryl Prescott, Justin Hurtt-Dunkley, Caleb McLaughlin, Bobbi Bordley, Kyle MacLachlan, and Bill Duke, with additional appearances of basketball players Reggie Jackson, Karl-Anthony Towns and Donovan Mitchell. The film follows a sports agent who must pull off a plan in 72 hours, pitching a controversial opportunity to his client, a rookie basketball player during the company's lockout. The film was shot entirely on the iPhone 8, becoming Soderbergh's second film to be shot on an iPhone, after Unsane.

The film had its world premiere at the Slamdance Film Festival on January 27, 2019, and was released on February 8, 2019, by Netflix. The film received positive reviews from critics, which praised its performances, Soderbergh's direction, themes, editing, shooting style, and screenplay.

== Plot ==
Ray Burke is an agent working for a New York sports agency that finds itself in the middle of a lockout. After his credit card is declined at an upscale restaurant, his boss David Starr tells him that the company is losing clients, the bank accounts and credit cards of the employees are frozen, and that he could be fired along with other employees. This forces Ray to look for a plan that could save the company from the lockout as well as give his client, Erick Scott, new opportunities. He recruits the help of his former assistant, Sam.

The next day, Ray visits newly drafted Jamero Umber's mother, Emera, with an offer. She refuses and reaffirms that she is the only agent and lawyer that her son will ever need. Ray's ex-wife, Myra, tells him that the company is in a lockout and will need to renegotiate new terms with agents and players. However, they will need to wait over a month to settle, as the team owners are at a standstill with the TV networks over millions of dollars. Ray asks her to cancel the deal, convinced that the players won't be paid well during the lockout, which could last up to six months. Meanwhile, future teammates Erick Scott and Jamero Umber have an argument on Twitter, heavily publicized by media outlets.

Ray heads to Back Court Day, an annual event at a community center featuring a basketball camp for local kids and appearances by star athletes. While Erick is signing autographs and answering questions, Jamero arrives with his mother in tow. Erick and Jamero confront each other about their Twitter argument; tensions rise as they trade insults. They end up playing a one-on-one basketball game, which is recorded by the kids on their phones. A video is posted on social media and goes viral, garnering 24 million views. Ray gets the idea to stream games on streaming services and social media sites like Snapchat, YouTube, and Netflix, thus enabling the players to make money during the lockout. Erick is not convinced though, and feels he could put his place in the NBA at risk. Nevertheless, he accepts.

The next day Sam meets with Ray to discuss their careers going forward. Sam mentions to Ray that Erick might fire him, as he's looking to "move laterally" within the company. Erick fires Ray for lying to him about the fact that everything was for money. However, Ray's plan succeeds and the players who signed with the company remained signed, meaning that Erick was never in danger and will be able to play in the league once the lockout is over. Ray reveals to Starr that the entire plan to take players to pay-per-view/streaming platforms was all a ruse to force the end of the lockout. It is implied that, through his actions, Ray has taken over Starr's position at the agency. Sam goes to work for the Players’ Association as she and Erick begin a relationship. Sam opens the package Ray gave Erick earlier, which he called a "Bible". The package contains Harry Edwards's book The Revolt of the Black Athlete. Sam begins to read it as Erick showers. Back at the agency, Ray is shown entering a meeting with Edwards. After Erick exits the shower and asks about the package, Sam replies: "You need to read this."

== Cast ==
- André Holland as Ray Burke
- Zazie Beetz as Sam
- Melvin Gregg as Erick Scott
- Sonja Sohn as Myra
- Zachary Quinto as David Starr
- Kyle MacLachlan as David Seton
- Bill Duke as Spencer
- Jeryl Prescott as Emera Umber
- Caleb McLaughlin as Darius
- Glenn Fleshler as Intimidating Seton Colleague
- Justin Hurtt-Dunkley as Jamero Umber
- Bobbi Bordley as Freddy

Additionally, Skip Bayless, Shannon Sharpe, Joy Taylor, Evan Rosenblum, Van Lathan, and Kristina Pink appear as themselves. Basketball players Reggie Jackson, Karl-Anthony Towns, and Donovan Mitchell make appearances as themselves in individual interview scenes.

== Production ==
In October 2017, it was announced André Holland had been cast in the film, with Steven Soderbergh directing from a screenplay written by Tarell Alvin McCraney, with Extension 765 producing. In March 2018, Zazie Beetz and Kyle MacLachlan joined the cast of the film. In April 2018, Melvin Gregg joined the cast of the film.

Principal photography began in February 2018, in New York City and the film wrapped on March 15, 2018. The film was shot using an iPhone 8 smartphone, equipped with an anamorphic lens produced by Moondog Labs, while utilizing the FiLMic Pro video app.

== Release ==
In September 2018, Netflix acquired distribution rights to the film. Speaking about how Netflix got involved with the film, director Steven Soderbergh explained:

"I'd been in conversations with Netflix during Unsane [also shot on an iPhone], and when I ended up going in a different way, I said, 'Look, I have this other thing, I will make sure you get eyes on it early.' When it was basically finished, I brought it to them and they said, 'Great, we'd like to buy it.' It felt like, the kind of film it is, the best way to maximize eyeballs. It's got a better shot at finding all the people who will like it. Otherwise, it's a slow-rolling platform release, which are expensive and you're bound by where the big arthouse theaters are. You can't just go anywhere. I just felt I'd rather have it drop and have everybody be able to see it."

It had its world premiere at the Slamdance Film Festival on January 27, 2019. It was released on February 8, 2019.

== Reception ==
On review aggregator Rotten Tomatoes, the film holds an approval rating of 91% based on 135 reviews, with an average of 7.3/10. The website's critics consensus reads: "High Flying Bird takes a thoughtful and engrossing look at professional sports that sees Steven Soderbergh continuing to test the limits of new filmmaking technology." On Metacritic, the film has a weighted average score of 78 out of 100, based on 23 critics, indicating "generally favorable" reviews.

== See also ==
- List of films shot on mobile phones
- List of basketball films
