= Banger (film) =

- Directed by: Adam Sedlák
- Written by: Adam Sedlák
- Produced by: Jakub Jíra, Kryštof Zelenka
- Starring: Adam Mišík
- Distributed by: Bontonfilm
- Release dates: 5 July 2022 (KVIFF); 22 September 2022 (Czech Republic)
- Running time: 105 minutes
- Country: Czech Republic
- Language: Czech
- Budget: 6,850,000 CZK

BANGER. is a 2022 Czech musical drama film directed by Adam Sedlák. It premiered at the Karlovy Vary International Film Festival on 5 July 2022. The story follows a young drug dealer who is obsessed and blinded by the desire to become famous as a rapper, to produce a rap hit - a banger. The film was created in 15 shooting days and was shot entirely on iPhone 12 Pro Max.

== Cast ==
- Adam Mišík as Alex
- Marsell Bendig as Láďa
- Anna Fialová as Alex's girlfriend
- Sergei Barracuda as himself
- Jan Révai
- Sára Rychlíková
- David Černý

== See also ==
List of films shot on mobile phones
