= New Love Meetings =

- Directed by: Barbara Seghezzi; Marcello Mencarini
- Written by: Barbara Seghezzi; Marcello Mencarini
- Produced by: Michele Neri
- Starring: Italian people
- Distributed by: Emage; Lulop
- Release date: November 12, 2005
- Running time: 93 minutes
- Country: Italy
- Language: Italian

New Love Meetings is an Italian documentary film made on a Nokia N90, the first feature film shot entirely with a Camera phone. The film was inspired by Pier Paolo Pasolini's documentary Love Meetings (1964) and is a modern version of that film.

New Love Meetings was produced by Michele Neri and directed by Barbara Seghezzi and Marcello Mencarini. It premiered at various film festivals, including Zurich Film Festival and Amsterdam International Documentary Film Festival in 2006.

== Plot ==
The documentary narrates about the erotism of Italian people and, collected interviews from the different area's people like social, cultural, geographical. Several ordinary people and sex professionals reveal their confessions in their sex life and suggest ideas for a better day of Italy.

== Production ==
The film cost around US$500,000 to make.

== See also ==
List of films shot on mobile phones
