= SMS Sugar Man =

- Directed by: Aryan Kaganof
- Written by: Aryan Kaganof
- Produced by: African Noise Foundation
- Starring: Aryan Kaganof; Leigh Graves; Deja Bernhardt
- Cinematography: Eran Tahor
- Edited by: Aryan Kaganof
- Music by: Michael Blake
- Release date: March 2008
- Running time: 81 minutes
- Country: South Africa
- Language: English

SMS Sugar Man is a South African narrative film shot entirely on Sony Ericsson W900i camera phones in 2008. The experimental feature film was directed by Aryan Kaganof and used eight cell phones to make the film.

SMS Sugar Man is the first feature-length film in the world to be made entirely with mobile camera phones.

== Plot ==
The film reveals the story of a pimp and two high-class prostitutes with some traveling incidents around Johannesburg on a Christmas Eve.

== Cast ==
- Aryan Kaganof as Sugar Man(Pimp)
- Leigh Graves as Grace(Prostitute)
- Deja Bernhardt as Selene(Prostitute)
- Samantha Rocca as Anna
- Attila Barna Attila Barna as Attilla
- Julius Moeletsi as Scorpion
- Patricia Boyer as Crack whore
- Zhouie Bernhardt as Jacky
- Jerry Mofokeng as wallet-1
- Norman Maake as Wallet son
- John Matshikiza as Wallet-2
- Ryan Fortune as Wallet-3
- Luthuli Dlamini as Wallet-4
- Bill Curry as Wallet-5

== Development ==
SMS Sugar Man was shot in eleven days with eight camera phones for less than 1 million rand ($164,100). Producer Michelle Wheatley said, "We wanted to make a radically low-budget film to show that anyone can do this".

== Analysis ==
Lizelle Bisschoff and Ann Overbergh wrote in "Digital as the New Popular in African Cinema? Case Studies from the Continent", published in Research in African Literatures, that SMS Sugar Man is a "semi-pornographic and highly erotic and subversive film, with a political subtext". They said that even though popular and easily accessible equipment was used to make the film, it cannot be called "popular art", but rather "underground" and "experimental".

== Reception ==
In a review of SMS Sugar Man in Under Ground Film Journal, Mike Everleth described the film as "a poetic, haunting film that uses a bold new technology to capture the most basic and primal of human interactions". He said that despite being shot entirely with camera phones, the film "never comes across as being gimmicky", and "never takes the cheap route in the telling of the story".

== See also ==
- List of films shot on mobile phones
