= 9 Rides =

- Directed by: Matthew A. Cherry
- Written by: Matthew A. Cherry
- Produced by: Jerome Caldwell; Matthew Keene Smith; Datari Turner
- Starring: Dorian Missick; Omar Dorsey; Robinne Lee; Sujata Day; Skye P. Marshall; Thomas Jones; Xosha Roquemore; Tracie Thomas; Nadine Ellis; Aasha Davis; Amin Joseph
- Cinematography: Richard Vialet
- Edited by: Matthew A. Cherry
- Production company: Twice Told Films
- Release date: March 11, 2016 (South by Southwest)
- Running time: 83 minutes
- Country: United States
- Language: English

9 Rides is a 2016 American film written and directed by Matthew A. Cherry and starring Dorian Missick, Omar Dorsey and Robinne Lee.

== Cast ==
- Dorian Missick as Driver
- Omar Dorsey as Uber Pool Man
- Robinne Lee as Girlfriend
- Sujata Day as Sleepy Woman
- Skye P. Marshall as Abused Woman
- Thomas Jones as Abusive Man
- Xosha Roquemore as Hipster Woman
- Tracie Thomas as Fiancé
- Nadine Ellis as Uber Pool Woman
- Aasha Davis as Flirty Woman
- Amin Joseph as Friend

== Production ==
The film was shot in less than week in November 2015 and entirely using iPhone 6s in 4K quality.

== Release ==
The film premiered at South by Southwest on March 11, 2016.

== Reception ==
Shannon M. Houston of Paste rated the film a 7.5.

== See also ==
List of films shot on mobile phones
