= Sony Ericsson W900i =

Mobile phone manufactured by Sony Ericsson

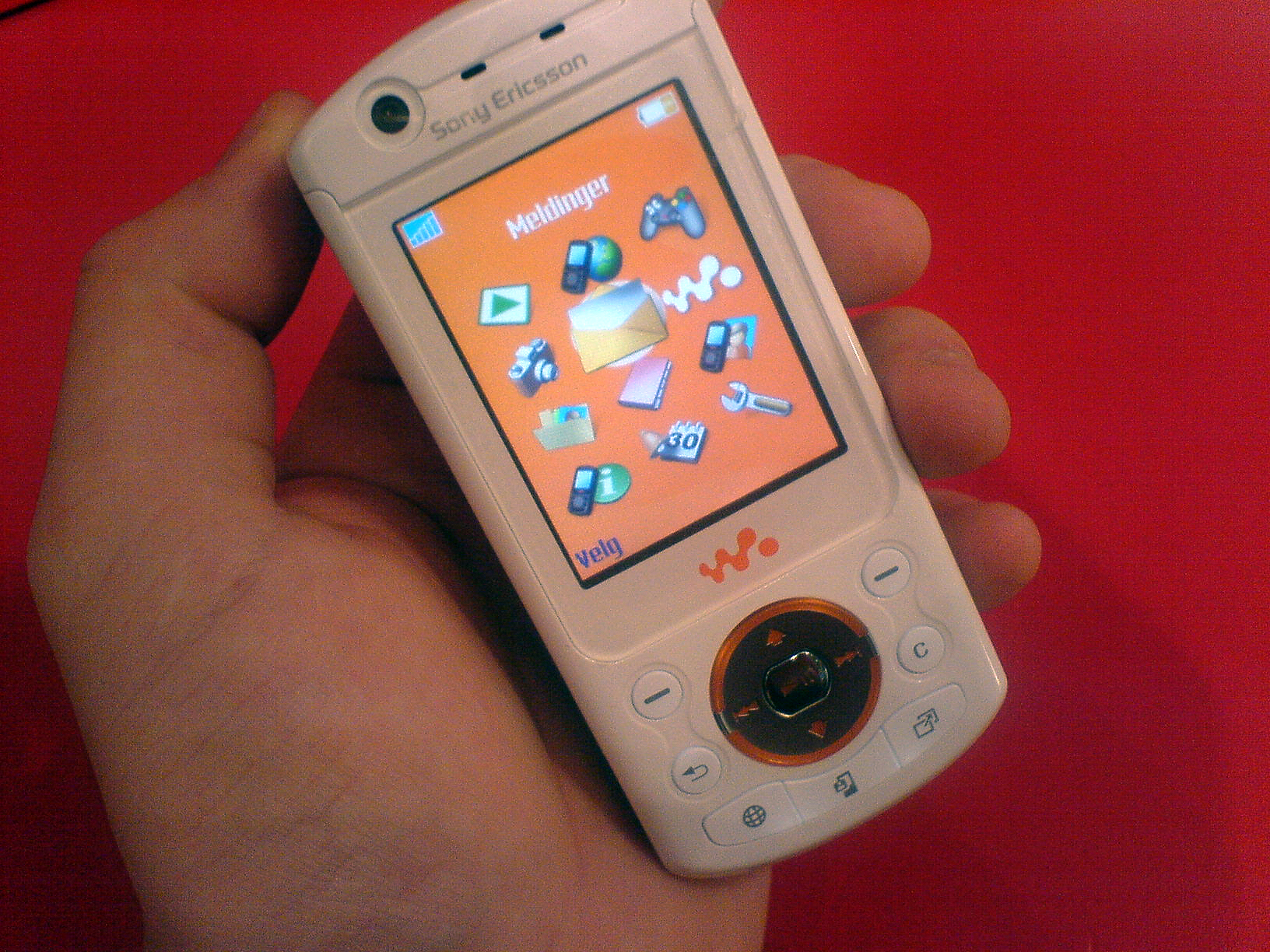
- Manufacturer: Sony Ericsson
- First released: December 2005; 20 years ago
- Predecessor: Sony Ericsson S700i (non-Walkman equivalent)
- Successor: Sony Ericsson W910i
- Related: Sony Ericsson W550i
- Compatible networks: WCDMA (UMTS/3G), HSCSD, GPRS GSM 900/1800/1900
- Form factor: Swivel
- Dimensions: 109х49х24 mm
- Weight: 148 g
- Operating system: Sony Ericsson proprietary OS (A100)
- Memory: 470 MB internal, 1 Memory Stick Pro Duo slot, 64 MB Memory Stick Pro Duo included and up to 8 GB
- Removable storage: Memory Stick PRO Duo
- Battery: BST-33; Li-Po 900 mAh
- Rear camera: 2 mega pixel
- Display: 320×240 pixels (QCIF+), 262,144 (18-bit) Color TFT LCD
- Data inputs: Keypad
- Codename: Sakura

The Sony Ericsson W900i is a 3G mobile phone manufactured by Sony Ericsson. The display of the device is a 240×320 pixel 262,000 color (an 18-bit color depth) 2.1-inch TFT QVGA screen. It has a swivel form factor, which makes the W900 larger than many other phones when folded open. In addition to the 470 MB of internal flash memory, it also supports the Memory Stick PRO Duo as external memory. It has class 10 (4+1 / 3+2 slots), 32–48 kbit/s GPRS. The W900 can achieve data transfer rates of 384 kbit/s due to its 3G technology. It also includes Bluetooth, a 2-megapixel digital camera with auto-focus and the ability to take QVGA video at 30 frame/s supplemented by a second VGA camera used for video calling and self-portraits and most advertised of all, its ability to play MP3 audio files in Walkman mode for up to 30 hours and its ability to play long length MPEG-4 videos. When using the W900i as a phone, the standby time is up to 379 hours and talktime of up to 8 hours and 40 minutes. Its dimensions are 109 mm × 24 mm × 49 mm (4.29 in × 0.94 in × 1.93 in) and its weight is 148 g (5.2 oz). It also has an internal NVIDIA GoForce 4800 graphics processor and was bundled with the HPM-80 headset.

The Sony Ericsson W900i was released in early 2005 as the highest end phone to supplement the already successful line of Sony Ericsson Walkman branded phones. The first to feature a graphics chip, it also had above average video and camera capabilities. The 2-megapixel digital camera featured autofocus and white balance akin to Sony's lineup of Cyber-shot cameras. Sony later branded the K800i with the Cyber-shot name. The phone was released to Vodafone exclusively for a large part of the year in its white colored variation. It was pulled from the market despite its success. The white color was popular across European markets. Not many carriers carried the black version, available for the full retail price from Sony Ericsson's retail website.

It is the phone used by James Bond in the 2006 Casino Royale film, as well as K800.

== Specifications ==
Screen 240x320 pixel 262,144 color TF Memory Stick Duo support Memory Stick PRO Duo support up to 8 GB (demands) Phone memory 470 MB

Networks GSM 900 GSM 1800 GSM 1900 UMTS

Available colours White Black

Sizes 109 × 24 × 49 mm 4.3 × 0.9 × 1.9 inches

Weight 148 g 5.2 oz

Camera 2 mega pixel digital camera with auto-focus. LED Light/Flash.

== Miscellaneous ==
- W900i has a text clipboard. It is possible to cut and paste text and numbers between contacts and messages, for example.
- Light can be used while taking pictures, videos, and outside the camera mode.
- Videos are captured in the 3GP format.
- The W900 is the last Sony Ericsson phone using the swivel form factor.

== Notable movies shot with the edition ==
- SMS Sugar Man
