= Hooked Up (film) =

- DVD cover
- Directed by: Pablo Larcuen
- Written by: Pablo Larcuen; Eduard Sola
- Produced by: Emília Fort; Pablo Larcuen
- Starring: Stephen Ohl; Jonah Ehrenreich
- Cinematography: Daniel Fernández Abelló
- Edited by: Antonio Gómez-Pan
- Production company: Ombra Films
- Distributed by: Uncork'd Entertainment
- Release date: 15 October 2013 (Sitges)
- Running time: 79 minutes
- Country: Spain
- Languages: English; Spanish
- Budget: €10,000–30,000

Hooked Up is a 2013 Spanish found footage horror film directed by Pablo Larcuen, written by Larcuen and Eduard Sola, and starring Stephen Ohl, Jonah Ehrenreich, Natascha Wiese, and Júlia Molins. It was shot entirely on an iPhone 4S. Hooked Up premiered at Sitges Film Festival on 15 October 2013 and was released to video-on-demand in the US on 7 April 2015.

== Plot ==
After one breaks up with his girlfriend, two American men go out for a wild night of partying in Barcelona, Spain. They are initially excited when two women invite them back to their house, but they find trouble in the form of a killer ghost who locks them in and attacks them.

== Cast ==
- Jonah Ehrenreich as Tonio
- Júlia Molins as Noemi
- Stephen Ohl as Peter
- Natascha Wiese as Katia

== Production ==
Casting took place in the United States over video. In the absence of any contracts, Larcuen and the two male leads got tattoos together, which Larcuen reasoned would keep them interested in the project. The film was shot on an iPhone 4S in 2011. Larcuen said that he chose the iPhone because he could not afford to shoot on film, and he did not want to use a cheap digital camera. Three iPhones were cycled during filming; battery power and storage space were issues. Hooked Up had a cinematographer who shot the film traditionally; it was not shot by the actors themselves. Apple was not involved in the film's production. Post-production took an extended period of time, as the sound designer, a volunteer, could only work on weekends.

== Release ==
Hooked Up premiered at the Sitges Film Festival on 15 October 2013. In the US, Uncork'd Entertainment released it to video on demand on April 7, 2015, and on DVD on June 9, 2015. It will be released in the UK on 27 April 2015. It is currently (as of December 2019) available for free on Amazon Prime.

== Reception ==
J. R. Southall of Starburst rated it 5/10 and wrote, "This will never be regarded as a great, but it is unexpectedly entertaining and if the iPhone conceit is an indication of things to come, it might have been a lot worse." Jessy Williams of Scream rated it 1/5 stars and wrote, "There is nothing in Hooked Up that is remotely original; it's basically an extended version of the winged succubus segment from V/H/S, but not quite as effective." Patrick Cooper of Bloody Disgusting rated it 2.5/5 stars and wrote, "Though it certainly goes in an unexpected direction, Hooked Up's end fails to make an impact. If you can make it past the painful first 20 minutes, I'd say it's definitely worth renting solely for the great middle chunk." Matt Boiselle of Dread Central rated it 0.5/5 stars and wrote, "do yourselves a colossal favor and bypass this 'hook-up' at all costs". Michael DeFillipo of Horror Society rated it 6.7/10 and called it "a pretty solid flick" with a boring lead-up and poor plot twist. HorrorTalk rated it 3/5 stars and wrote that "it's not all bad, and it's competently directed", but it "doesn't offer anything new".

== See also ==
- List of films shot on mobile phones
