= Unsane =

2018 horror-thriller film by Steven Soderbergh

- Theatrical release poster
- Directed by: Steven Soderbergh
- Written by: Jonathan Bernstein; James Greer
- Produced by: Joseph Malloch
- Starring: Claire Foy; Joshua Leonard; Jay Pharoah; Juno Temple; Aimee Mullins; Amy Irving; Matt Damon
- Cinematography: Peter Andrews
- Edited by: Mary Ann Bernard
- Music by: David Wilder Savage
- Production companies: Regency Enterprises; Fingerprint Releasing; Extension 765
- Distributed by: Fingerprint Releasing; Bleecker Street (United States); 20th Century Fox (International)
- Release dates: February 21, 2018 (Berlinale); March 23, 2018 (United States)
- Running time: 98 minutes
- Country: United States
- Language: English
- Budget: $1.5 million
- Box office: $14.3 million

Unsane is a 2018 American psychological thriller film directed by Steven Soderbergh and written by Jonathan Bernstein and James Greer. The film stars Claire Foy, Joshua Leonard, Jay Pharoah, Juno Temple, Aimee Mullins, and Amy Irving. Matt Damon has a cameo appearance as a detective. The film follows a woman confined to a mental institution after she is pursued by a stalker. The film was shot entirely on the iPhone 7 Plus.

Unsane had its world premiere at the Berlin International Film Festival on February 21, 2018, and was theatrically released in the United States on March 23, 2018, by Soderbergh's production company Fingerprint Releasing and Bleecker Street. The film was a commercial success, grossing over $14 million on a budget of $1.5 million. It received generally positive reviews from critics, who mainly praised the performances, direction, cinematography and production values.

== Plot ==
To escape a stalker, Sawyer Valentini moves away from her Boston home. Still paranoid and traumatized, she talks with a counselor at Highland Creek Behavioral Center, who tricks her into signing a consent form for voluntary 24-hour admission to a locked psychiatric hospital. Sawyer calls the police, who can do nothing due to the signed form. During the night, stress causes Sawyer to lash out at a patient and a staff member. Consequently, the staff psychiatrist retains her for seven more days.

Another patient, Nate Hoffman, reveals to Sawyer that Highland Creek is running a scheme to exploit health insurance claims. They trick people into voluntarily committing themselves as long as the patients' insurance companies continue to pay; when insurance claims run out, the patient is "cured" and released. One day, Sawyer sees David Strine, her stalker, working as an orderly under the pseudonym George Shaw.

Borrowing Nate's secret cellphone, Sawyer calls her mother Angela. David gives Sawyer a large dose of methylphenidate, causing her to appear insane. That evening, when Angela arrives to attempt to get Sawyer out, David approaches her posing as a hotel employee, and kills her.

David tortures Nate then kills him with an overdose of fentanyl. Sawyer finds Nate's phone under her pillow, with images of Nate badly beaten. She alerts the staff, who dismiss and put her in solitary confinement. David visits Sawyer and says he has a secluded mountain cabin he wants to take Sawyer to. Sawyer mocks him for his inexperience with women. David later returns and reveals he faked that Sawyer's insurance ran out, changing her status to released. In a forest, the body of the real George Shaw is found.

To buy time, Sawyer feigns concern that David is a virgin, and that she does not want to be his first. She convinces David to have sex with another woman and suggests Violet, who previously threatened Sawyer with a shank, and he brings her to the solitary confinement cell. Sawyer uses Violet's shank to stab David in the neck and flees as he kills Violet. He recaptures Sawyer outside, and she wakes up in the trunk of his car next to her mother's corpse.

Jumping from the moving car, Sawyer flees into the woods. David catches up and breaks her ankle with a hammer. Sawyer stabs him in the eye with Angela's cross and slashes his throat with the shank. Meanwhile, it is revealed that Nate was an undercover investigative journalist sent to investigate Highland Creek. Police execute a warrant on the center and arrest the hospital administrator.

Six months later, while having lunch, Sawyer sees David sitting nearby. She approaches with a knife, but upon realizing it is not him, she drops the knife and runs away.

== Cast ==
- Claire Foy as Sawyer Valentini
- Joshua Leonard as David Strine/George Shaw, Sawyer's stalker
- Jay Pharoah as Nate Hoffman, Sawyer's friend at the institution
- Juno Temple as Violet, a patient of the institution who antagonizes Sawyer
- Gibson Frazier as Dr. Hawthorne, Sawyer's psychiatrist
- Aimee Mullins as Ashley Brighterhouse, head of the institution
- Amy Irving as Angela Valentini, Sawyer's mother
- Polly McKie as Nurse Boles, head nurse at the institution
- Zach Cherry as Denis, a new employee of the institution
- Sarah Stiles as Jill, a coworker of Sawyer's whom she dislikes
- Matt Damon as Detective Ferguson, a detective who advises Sawyer
- Raúl Castillo as Jacob
- Mike Mihm as Steve
- Robert Kelly as Steve's Partner
- Colin Woodell as Mark

== Production ==
In July 2017, it was announced Steven Soderbergh had shot a film in secret in June 2017, starring Claire Foy and Juno Temple. The film was shot on an iPhone 7 Plus in 4K using the app FiLMiC Pro, and was released through Soderbergh's Fingerprint Releasing banner. In August 2017, Jay Pharoah confirmed that he was a co-star in the film.

== Release ==
The film had its world premiere at the Berlin International Film Festival on February 21, 2018. and was released in the United States on March 23, 2018.

== Reception ==
=== Box office ===
Unsane has grossed $7.7 million in the United States and Canada, and $6.5 million in other territories, for a worldwide total of $14.2 million.

In the United States and Canada, Unsane was released alongside Pacific Rim Uprising, Midnight Sun, Sherlock Gnomes and Paul, Apostle of Christ, and was projected to gross $3 million from 2,023 theaters in its opening weekend. It ended up debuting to $3.7 million, finishing 11th at the box office. In its second weekend the film made $1.4 million, a 61.6% drop.

=== Critical response ===
On review aggregator website Rotten Tomatoes, the film holds an approval rating of 80% based on 239 reviews, and an average rating of 6.7/10. The website's critical consensus reads, "Unsane unleashes Steven Soderbergh's inner B-movie maestro, wading into timeless psychological thriller territory and giving it a high-tech filmmaking spin." On Metacritic, the film has a weighted average score of 63 out of 100, based on 45 critics, indicating "generally favorable reviews". Audiences polled by CinemaScore gave the film an average grade of "B−" on an A+ to F scale.

Richard Brody from The New Yorker wrote "Above all, [Soderbergh] revels, with palpable joy, in his repertory of distorted, disturbing, lurid yet lucid images, making a furious movie that signifies nothing but the irrepressible vitality of the cinema itself. Soderbergh's experiment is a success." Justin Chang of the Los Angeles Times wrote, "Soderbergh is one of the most dexterous directors working in the American mainstream, and he has a sly talent for lacing even a seemingly disposable genre offering with smart, incisive ideas."

== See also ==
- List of films shot on mobile phones
- Involuntary commitment
