= Cyrus Frisch =

Dutch avant-garde film maker

Cyrus Frisch (born 1969, Amsterdam) is a Dutch filmmaker and theater maker whose work includes feature films, documentaries, and stage productions. Active since the early 1990s, Frisch has developed a body of work that has generated sustained critical discussion in the Netherlands and internationally. His films have screened at numerous international film festivals and have been the subject of retrospectives, critical essays, and academic debate, particularly in relation to spectatorship, ethical responsibility, and the moral implications of cinematic representation.

Early in his career, Frisch was frequently described as an enfant terrible of Dutch cinema and was sometimes referred to as "the wild man of Dutch film," labels reflecting the confrontational tone of his early work. Over time, however, critical discourse increasingly emphasized the social and political engagement of his films. Frisch has consistently stated that this engagement was already present from the beginning of his career, and that later works represent a continuation rather than a shift in artistic intent.

== Early life and education ==
Cyrus Frisch was born and raised in Amsterdam. He studied at the Netherlands Film and Television Academy, where he developed an approach to filmmaking focused on direct confrontation, intimacy, and ethical responsibility. During his studies, Frisch explored cinema as a medium capable of addressing moral and societal questions without offering explanatory frameworks or narrative reassurance.

His student short film De kut van Maria (1990) attracted early attention for its uncompromising tone and treatment of taboo subjects. The film is also notable for featuring an early screen appearance by Arnon Grunberg, who would later gain international recognition as a novelist and essayist.

== Film career ==
=== Early works and critical reception ===
Frisch’s debut feature, Zelfbeklag (Self-Pity, 1993), established him as a distinct presence within Dutch cinema. The film’s focus on exposure, vulnerability, and self-scrutiny, combined with its austere visual style, contributed to his early reputation as a provocative filmmaker.

With Ik zal je leven eren… (I Shall Honour Your Life…, 1997), Frisch’s work began to be discussed in a different critical register. The film documents the death of Dutch film critic and teacher Hans Saaltink and adopts a restrained observational approach. By focusing on spaces, objects, and people in the immediate aftermath of death, the film reflects on mortality, absence, and ethical presence. Critics described the film as an early indication that reflection and engagement, rather than provocation alone, were central to Frisch’s cinematic practice.

=== Vergeef me (Forgive Me) ===
Vergeef me (Forgive Me, 2001) further consolidated Frisch’s reputation both nationally and internationally. The film places a group of socially marginalized individuals in situations that foreground power relations between those who are seen and those who watch. Rather than offering interpretation or resolution, the film confronts viewers with prolonged encounters that raise questions about responsibility, agency, and consent.

The project was later adapted into a touring stage production. The theatrical version emphasized immediacy and audience proximity, extending the film’s exploration of spectatorship and ethical involvement beyond the cinematic context.

=== Waarom heeft niemand mij verteld dat het zo erg zou worden in Afghanistan ===
Waarom heeft niemand mij verteld dat het zo erg zou worden in Afghanistan (Why Didn’t Anybody Tell Me It Would Become This Bad in Afghanistan, 2007) centers on a war veteran living in isolation and psychological distress in Amsterdam. The film incorporates images of urban unrest filmed from the director’s own apartment, establishing a close relationship between private experience and global conflict.

The narrative is structured around the protagonist’s subjective perception, emphasizing fragmentation and sensory overload. The film is widely cited as the first feature-length fiction film worldwide to be shot entirely on a mobile phone, a formal choice that reinforces its immediacy and intimacy.

=== Blackwater Fever ===
Blackwater Fever (2008) follows a man suffering from malaria during a journey through regions marked by social and economic inequality. The film closely aligns the viewer with the protagonist’s perception, gradually destabilizing conventional markers of time and place.

Critics noted that this sustained alignment with the protagonist’s inner state produces a viewing experience characterized by disorientation and perceptual instability. The surrounding world is filtered through illness and exhaustion, resulting in what reviewers have described as a feverish or dreamlike quality that foregrounds individual moral awareness rather than external explanation.

=== Oogverblindend (Dazzle) ===
Oogverblindend (Dazzle, 2009), starring Georgina Verbaan and featuring the voice of Rutger Hauer, unfolds almost entirely through the perspective of its female protagonist. Confined to her apartment, she observes events outside her window while engaging in a prolonged telephone conversation.

The film maintains deliberate ambiguity regarding whether the events she experiences occur in objective reality or are shaped by imagination and psychological strain. Critics have pointed to this sustained uncertainty and restricted perspective as producing an immersive and unsettling viewing experience. The film addresses themes of guilt, complicity, and historical responsibility, including references to Argentina’s military dictatorship.

== World Problems Project ==
Since the early 2000s, Frisch has been developing a long-term initiative known as the World Problems Project. Conceived as a cycle of three to five feature films, the project aims to address major global challenges such as poverty, disease, violence, and environmental crises.

According to Frisch, each film is intended to focus on a single world problem while also engaging with possible solutions. In interviews and profiles, the project has been discussed as an attempt to rethink the role of fiction cinema in relation to global crises by combining factual research with an emphasis on individual perception and moral responsibility. Commentators have described this constructive orientation as unusual within fiction cinema, where global crises are more commonly depicted without attention to potential paths forward.

== Reception and legacy ==
Critical reception of Cyrus Frisch’s work has evolved considerably over the course of his career. Early responses frequently emphasized the confrontational nature of his films, contributing to his reputation as an enfant terrible within Dutch cinema. These characterizations were often linked to his refusal to provide narrative reassurance or moral resolution.

From the late 1990s onward, critics increasingly framed Frisch’s work in terms of ethical engagement. Films such as Ik zal je leven eren… and Vergeef me generated sustained discussion about spectatorship, responsibility, and the moral position of the viewer. Writing in Film Comment, Olaf Müller described Frisch as a filmmaker who consistently confronts audiences with situations in which the act of looking itself becomes ethically charged.

Internationally, Frisch’s work has been discussed in publications including Variety, Filmmaker Magazine, Screen Anarchy, and Sabzian. In these contexts, his films are often situated within broader debates about political cinema, the limits of representation, and the relationship between cinematic form and moral inquiry.

Frisch’s films have also been presented in retrospective contexts. In 2011, programs devoted to his work were shown at institutions including EYE Film Institute Netherlands and the Hong Kong Arts Centre, where his films were contextualized in relation to their thematic coherence and long-term engagement with global and ethical questions.

According to Sabzian, Frisch’s work has been cited with admiration by internationally recognized filmmakers such as Gaspar Noé and Guy Maddin, who have identified him as a distinctive and uncompromising voice in contemporary cinema.

== Selected filmography ==
- De kut van Maria (short, 1990)
- Zelfbeklag (Self-Pity, 1993)
- Ik zal je leven eren… (I Shall Honour Your Life…, 1997)
- Vergeef me (Forgive Me, 2001)
- Waarom heeft niemand mij verteld dat het zo erg zou worden in Afghanistan (Why Didn’t Anybody Tell Me It Would Become This Bad in Afghanistan2007)
- Blackwater Fever (2008)
- Oogverblindend (Dazzle, 2009)
