= Rel Dowdell =

American film director

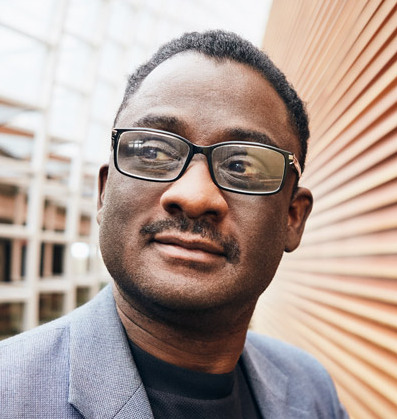
- Born: Philadelphia, Pennsylvania, U.S.
- Occupations: professor, director, writer, and producer

Rel J. Dowdell is an American screenwriter, film director, film producer, orator, and film studies/screenwriting/English educator. Born and raised in Philadelphia, after graduating from the prestigious Central High School in Philadelphia, he received his bachelor's degree in English with magna cum laude honors from Fisk University (where he served as SGA President) and his advanced degree in film and screenwriting with highest distinction from Boston University. He won the top prize in filmmaking at Boston University's noted Redstone Film Festival in 1995. He is also a full-time university professor, Director of Film Studies, English scholar, and film historian. Additionally, he has done prominent and extensive interviews with veteran award-winning actors such as Ving Rhames, Lou Gossett Jr., Keith David, Tony Todd, Roger Guenveur Smith, Larenz Tate, and Mykelti Williamson. In spring of 2023, he participated in a major interview with other African-American scholars on The 700 Club where he spoke about the impact of the casting of an African-American female actress in the remake of The Little Mermaid in where he was singularly well received and praised for Dowdell's remarks of inclusion and inspiration for African-American youths. In the spring of 2025, leading studio Warner Brothers selected Dowdell to interview two-time Oscar-winning costume designer Ruth Carter before the release of the blockbuster and ultimately Oscar-winning film Sinners. Dowdell has also been well-quoted numerous times in top entertainment publications such as The Hollywood Reporter and Deadline providing comprehensive overviews of historical context and reverence when groundbreaking and unsung African-American actors and actresses pass away.

Dowdell's first feature film, Train Ride, received substantial critical acclaim. Produced with independent financing, the film was acquired and distributed by Sony Pictures in 2005 and was a tremendous financial success. Train Ride was ranked as one of the best American films that year as cited by veteran film critic Gerald Peary of The Boston Phoenix. The film also garnered high praise in film historian and writer Irv Slifkin's best-selling book, Filmadelphia: A Celebration of a City's Movies. Train Ride also won the honor of "Best Feature" at the American Theatre of Harlem Film festival in 2005. In addition, the film featured the last performance of acclaimed veteran actress Esther Rolle. The film also starred Wood Harris, MC Lyte, Russell Hornsby, Nicole Prescott, and the late, celebrated hip-hop artist Guru.

Veteran film critic Gerald Peary of The Boston Phoenix has compared Dowdell to John Singleton and Spike Lee in the way that his filmmaking blends urban storytelling and suspense to tackle relevant and universal social issues that are intimately intertwined with a powerful moral message. Peary stated in the July 17, 2005 edition of The Boston Phoenix that Train Ride was "one of the best American movies so far this year, on screen or on video."

Dowdell's next feature film effort as writer and director was a drama entitled Changing the Game, which was shot in Philadelphia in the summer of 2010 and theatrically released in May 2012. The film stars Sean Riggs, Irma P. Hall, Dennis L.A. White, Brandon Ruckdashel, and Mari White. There were special appearances by the late, acclaimed actress Suzzanne Douglas, noted hip hop artist Sticky Fingaz, and Tony Todd. The film was cited by FilmFresh.com as one of the top three African-American films of 2012. The film also had a syndicated 3 out of 4 star critics rating when the film was broadcast on cable.

Dowdell's third feature film effort is a feature-length documentary entitled, Where's Daddy?, which was shot in Philadelphia in the winter of 2017 and was released in February 2018. The film examines perspectives on the child support system and the specific effect and consequences to African-American families, with emphasis on the experience of fathers as participants in the system where Dowdell solely interviewed all of the subjects. Some of the subjects interviewed by Dowdell in the film include hip hop artist Freeway and former Philadelphia Eagles Pro Bowl wide receiver Fred Barnett. The film has a 100% critics rating on Rotten Tomatoes. The film has been acquired by the libraries of some of the most distinguished institutions of higher learning such as Harvard University, Yale University, Columbia University, Princeton University, The University of Pennsylvania, Dartmouth College, MIT, Swarthmore College, Duke University, Vanderbilt University, The University of Southern California, The University of California, Los Angeles, New York University, and The University of North Carolina at Chapel Hill. In fall of 2022, Dowdell was invited by Dr. Elijah Anderson, Sterling Professor of Sociology and of African American Studies at Yale University, to screen and discuss the film.

Dowdell's most recent feature film project is a documentary on history-making African-American collegiate educator Dr. Ira De Augustine Reid, who was one of the first African-Americans to receive tenure at a prestigious predominately Northern Caucasian institution in Haverford College in Haverford, PA. The documentary is titled Dr. Ira De A. Reid: Haverford College's Unsung Scholar/Activist. The acclaimed documentary features Dr. Cornel West, Haverford College's President Dr. Wendy Raymond, Dr. Roger Lane, Dr. Sarah Willie-LeBreton, Dr. Marcel Gutwirth, and Charles Lawrence, esq. The documentary was released by distribution company Maverick Entertainment on various streaming platforms such as TUBI in November 2024. The extensive interview Dowdell did with Dr. Cornel West was so highly regarded that it has since been offered as a "world-class masterclass" for graduate-level students in various areas of study by scholars.
