= Frank Merle =

American filmmaker

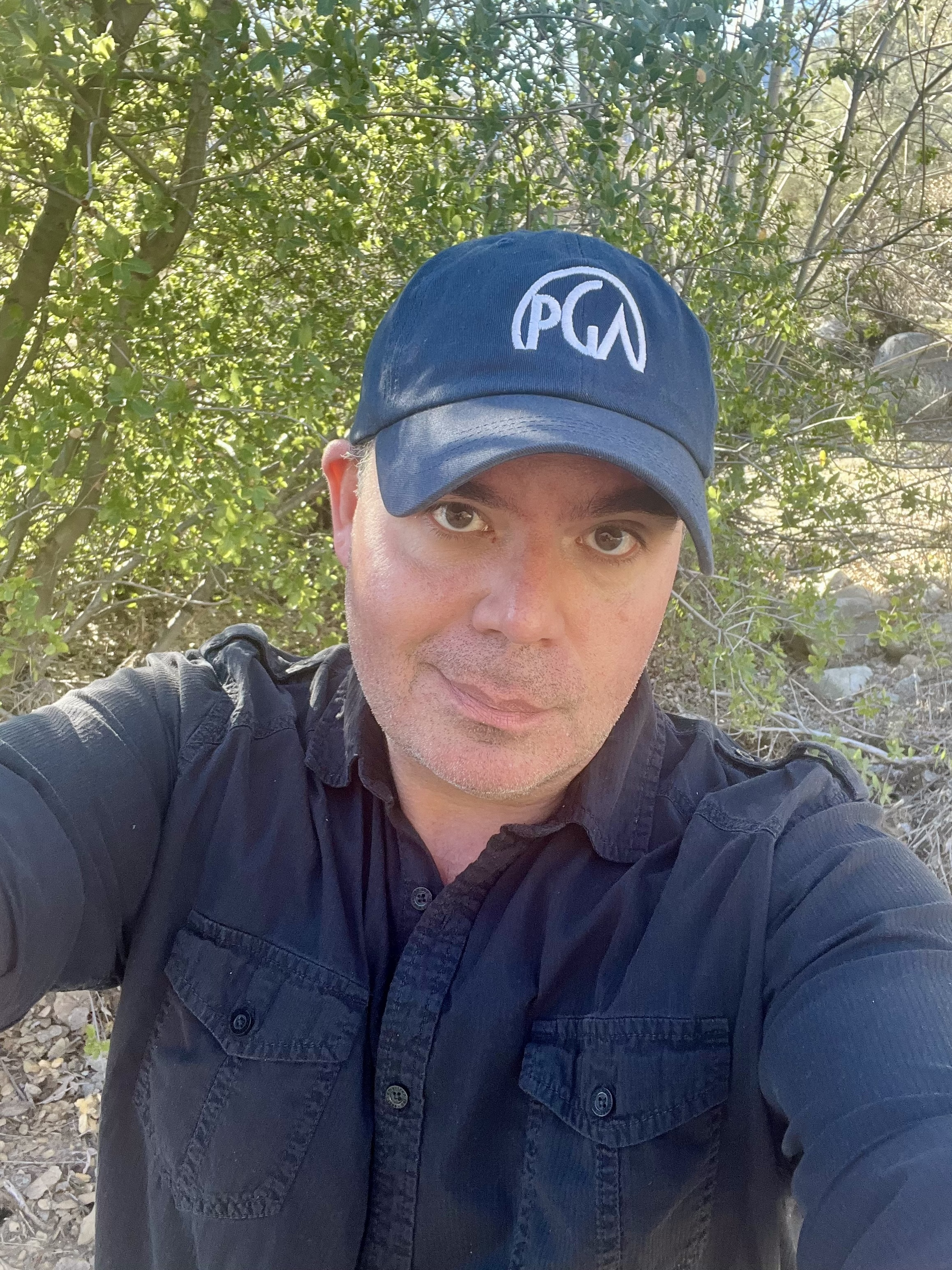
- Merle in 2026
- Education: DePaul University (BFA)
- Occupations: Screenwriter, director, producer
- Known for: Writing, producing, and directing The Employer and From Jennifer

Frank Merle is an American screenwriter, director and producer best known for The Employer and From Jennifer. Also a theatrical producer and director, Merle graduated from The Theatre School at DePaul University.

== Film career ==
Merle co-founded Keyhole Theatre Company in the Wicker Park neighborhood of Chicago, IL. He served as artistic director of Keyhole Theatre Company for seven years until it closed. He made the short films, What Joan Knows, Morgan's Last Call, Gnaw, Art Room, and Carnage on Graves Farm. The latter three were released on home video in 2010 as Carnage, Chaos & Creeps.

Merle's first feature film was the 2013 psychological thriller The Employer. It was a Shriekfest official selection and Merle won Best director for the film at the Los Angeles Movie Awards. In 2016, Dread Central reported that Merle would write and direct From Jennifer, the third installment in the To Jennifer found-footage series originated by James Cullen Bressack.

== Filmography ==
Year	Film	Credited as			Notes
Year	Film	Director	Producer	Writer	Notes
2007	What Joan Knows	Yes	Yes	Yes	short film
2008	Morgan's Last Call	Yes	Yes	Yes	short film
2008	Gnaw	Yes	Yes	Yes	short film
2009	Art Room	Yes	Yes	Yes	short film
2009	Carnage on Graves Farm	Yes	Yes	Yes	short film
2010	Carnage, Chaos & Creeps	Yes	Yes	Yes	short film
2013	The Employer	Yes	Yes	Yes	
2016	2 Jennifer	No	Yes	No	
2017	From Jennifer	Yes	Yes	Yes	
2018	For Jennifer	No	Yes	No	
2021	The Gloom	Yes	Yes	No	podcast series
2022	Tales From the Other Side	Yes	Yes	No	segment director/producer
2022	Goodnight	Yes	Yes	No	
2022	Forgotten	No	Yes	No	
2022	Catfish Christmas	No	Yes	No	
2023	All Gone Wrong	No	Yes	No	
2023	Blood Covered Chocolate	No	Yes	No	
2023	Driftwood	No	Yes	No	executive producer
2024	Porcelain	No	Yes	No	
2025	A Hard Place	No	Yes	No	co-producer
2025	Namaka	Yes	Yes	Yes	
