= Eli Goodman =

American actor

- Born: February 12, 1971 (age 54)
- Education: DePaul University
- Occupation: Actor
- Years active: 1997–present

Eli Goodman (born July 12, 1971) is an American film and television actor, active since 1997. He has appeared in more than 25 film and television series. He studied toward a BFA in acting at The Theatre School at DePaul University.

== Filmography ==
=== Film ===
Year	Title	Character	Notes
2002	Tour of Pain	Lacey's Boyfriend	Short film
2004	A Moment of Grace	David	Short film
2006	Death and Don	Doctor	Short film
2006	Stranger than Fiction	Augustus Chatman	Uncredited
2011	Take Me Home	Alan	Feature
2013	The Employer	Greg	Feature

=== Television ===
Year	Title	Character	Notes
1997	Chicago Hope	Young FBI Agent	Episode: "The Day of the Rope"
1998	Early Edition	Clerk	Episode: "Nest Egg", uncredited
2005–06	The Young and the Restless	David	Three episodes
2006	The Closer	Ari Cohen	Episode: "Blue Blood"
2006	ER	NICU Resident	Two episodes
2007	Shark	Michael Green	Episode: "Starlet Fever"
2007	CSI: NY	Greg Sanford	Episode: "A Daze of Wine and Roaches"
2007	State of Mind	Dr. Rosen	Episode: "Between Here and There"
2007	Women's Murder Club	Robert Danies	Episode: "Grannies, Guns and Love Mints"
2007	Dexter	Det. Weiss	Two episodes
2008	Eli Stone	David	Episode: "The Humanitarian"
2009	Hawthorne	Dr. Alan Spitzer	Three episodes
2009	Bones	Dr. Alexander Wheaton	Episode: "A Night at the Bones Museum"
2010	24	Dr. Joel Levine	Two episodes
2010	Class	Dr. Franklin	TV movie
2010	The Defenders	Dyson Radcliff	Episode: "Nevada v. Carter"
2010	NCIS	Adam Gator	Episode: "Dead Air"
2012	The Mentalist	Dave Bisping	Episode: "His Thoughts Were Red Thoughts"
2014	Longmire	ADA Sloan	Episode: "Counting Cop"
2014	The Messengers	Psychiatrist	TV movie, Post-production
