= Irv Slifkin =

American film writer, critic and editor

Irv L. Slifkin is an American film writer, critic, editor and educator. He is associated with Movies Unlimited, a Philadelphia-based home video retailer and publisher of the Movies Unlimited Video Catalog. Slifkin has taught film at Temple University and has contributed film criticism to the Los Angeles Times, The Philadelphia Inquirer, the Chicago Tribune, Empire, Entertainment Weekly and Delaware Valley Magazine.

== Career ==
Slifkin has written about film for print and online publications and has contributed to VideoHound. He organized Mondo Meyer, a Philadelphia event celebrating the work of filmmaker Russ Meyer.

== Books and film work ==
Slifkin is the author of Groovy Movies: Far-Out Films of the Psychedelic Era, published by Visible Ink Press, and Filmadelphia: A Celebration of a City's Movies, published by Mid-Atlantic Press. He appeared as an actor in the film Changing the Game (2012).

Slifkin co-produced and co-wrote the documentary series Time Warp: The Greatest Cult Films of All-Time, released in 2020, and Cold War on Ice: Flyers vs. Russia '75.
