= Joel Fink =

American actor

- Education: Art Institute of Chicago (BFA); New York University (MFA)

Joel G. Fink is an American actor, director, acting coach and theatre administrator. He is Professor Emeritus of Theatre, The Theatre Conservatory of the Chicago College of Performing Arts at Roosevelt University in Chicago, where he also served as Associate Dean and Founding Director of the conservatory. Fink also served as the Casting Director/Artistic Associate of the Colorado Shakespeare Festival from 1988 until 2003. Fink holds a doctorate and an MFA from Tisch School of the Arts at New York University. He holds a BFA from the Goodman School of Drama at the Art Institute of Chicago (now at DePaul University).

== Actor/director ==
Fink has worked at the Barter Theatre of Virginia, Center Stage Theatre of Baltimore, Chicago Shakespeare Theatre, Illinois Shakespeare Festival, Colorado Shakespeare Festival, the Mark Taper Forum of Los Angeles, Organic Touchstone, Bailiwick Theatre, and the Chicago Humanities Festival, among other theatres.

As an actor, Fink appeared in the Chicago premiere of David Hare's Racing Demon at the Organic/Touchstone Theatre and in Hamlet, The Comedy of Errors and As You Like It for the Colorado Shakespeare Festival.

Fink has directed and acted in over 100 productions in university and regional productions across the country, including the world premiere of Jean-Claude Van Italie's Ancient Boys, at the University of Colorado, and of his own setting of the works of Edgar Allan Poe, An Unkindness of Ravens, at Roosevelt University. For CSF, he directed A Midsummer Night's Dream, Romeo and Juliet, Twelfth Night, Pericles (2005), The Rivals, The Importance of Being Earnest, Much Ado About Nothing, Cymbeline, and Titus Andronicus.

== Teaching ==
In addition to Roosevelt University's Theatre Conservatory, Fink has taught at New York University's Professional Theatre Training Program, Purdue University's Professional Training program, California State University, the New School for Social Research, Circle in the Square Theatre School, Hunter College and the University of Colorado at Boulder, where he was head of the Acting program for ten years. Fink was featured in performink's online transcription of a 2005 group interview, Advice for the College Audition, along with directors of several midwestern college theatre programs.

He is a past chair of the Acting Focus Group for the American Theatre in Higher Education Association.

== Publications ==
Fink has published numerous articles, book chapters, reviews, and original and adapted plays, including The Rivals and An Unkindness of Ravens. Selected example of publications: "Robert Woodruff's Circus Production, 1983" was featured in Robert S. Miola's A Comedy of Errors: Critical Essays. Fink's article Too, Too Solid Flesh: Massage Therapy as an Effective Intervention in Actor-Training and Performance was featured in Theatre Topics, a journal of the Johns Hopkins University Press in 1991.

Fink's production of Ancient Boys was described in Gene A. Plunka's Jean-Claude van Itallie and the off-broadway theater (1990).

Fink is quoted in Jim Volk's The Back Stage guide to working in regional theater: jobs for actors and other Theatre Professionals. (2007)

== Affiliations ==
Fink is a member of Actors' Equity Association, the Screen Actor's Guild/American Federation of Film and Television Artists, the International Jugglers' Association, The National Theatre Conference, and the American Massage Therapy Association, and is a certified massage therapist from the Swedish Institute in New York City.
