= Teen Dream (band) =

American R&B band

- Origin: Columbus, Ohio, U.S.
- Genres: R&B, synth-pop, Freestyle music
- Years active: 1985–1990
- Labels: Warner Bros. Records Inc. Muscle Shoals Sound Records

Teen Dream was a three girl R&B and synth-pop group from Columbus, Ohio formed by producer Chris Powell in 1985. They are best recognized by their 1987 hit "Let's Get Busy" which peaked at #41 on Billboard's Hot Black Singles chart. The group partnered with "Valentino", actor Michael DeLorenzo.

Teen Dream was a musical group that achieved notable success in the mid and late 1980s. Throughout their journey, they sold over 100,000 record albums worldwide. The band's popularity extended to various regions, both domestically and internationally.

During their active years, Teen Dream collaborated with renowned American R&B and freestyle artists from the eastern part of the United States. Notably, they worked with Expose, a freestyle band hailing from Miami, Florida, who gained recognition for their 1985 hit "Point of No Return." The Mac Band, an R&B quartet from Flint, Michigan, gained fame through their single "Roses Are Red" released in 1988. Another notable collaboration was with Lisa Lisa & Cult Jam, a freestyle R&B band from New York City. Additionally, The Jets (band) from Minneapolis, Minnesota, known for their 1987 hit "Cross My Broken Heart" on the Beverly Hills Cop Soundtrack, joined forces with Teen Dream. These collaborations significantly contributed to the rise of R&B and freestyle music as a whole, with all the bands frequently performing together at various music venues.

Although Teen Dream had limited success as an R&B group in the United States, performing live only three times at different music scenes, it is possible that they achieved more mainstream recognition overseas. Despite their potential, the band did not reach the brink of widespread popularity. In 1988, Teen Dream was dropped from Warner Bros., leading to Terri's departure from the group. However, producer Chris Powell decided to keep the group going. He recruited two new members, including Tia Stewart, and secured a record deal with the Muscle Shoals Sound Records label in 1989. Unfortunately, their release "Games" failed to make an impact on the charts, ultimately leading to the band's decline. By 1990, Teen Dream disbanded, with only one member remaining from the original lineup. Since then, the group faded into obscurity.

Following the breakup, Terri Whitlow pursued a career in music and currently leads her own band, "Terri Whitlow and the Show." She continues to reside in Columbus, Ohio, with her family. Lisa Jackson found success in her professional life, currently serving as a Senior Manager of Accounting Services for The Davey Tree Expert Company in Cleveland, Ohio. Information regarding Nikki Cooper's current activities remains unknown.

Chris Powell continues to actively participate in the music industry. Based in Columbus, Ohio, he runs and supports the formation of new musical groups.

== Members ==
- Terri Whitlow - lead vocals
- Lisa Jackson - vocals
- Nikki Cooper - vocals, synthesizer, keyboards
- Benny Medina - producer, all instruments
- Dan Hargrove - producer, keyboards, all instruments
- Chris Powell - executive producer, all instruments

== Discography ==
- ”Let's Get Busy” 1986
- ”Toy” 1987
- ”I Hear Talk” 1987
- ”Games” 1989
- ”Everybody Is Somebody” (from the soundtrack Lean on Me, featuring Riff and Taja Sevelle), 1989
