= The Inkwell =

- Theatrical release poster
- Directed by: Matty Rich
- Written by: Trey Ellis; Paris Qualles
- Produced by: Irving Azoff; Matthew Baer; Jon J. Jashni; Guy Riedel
- Starring: Larenz Tate; Joe Morton; Suzzanne Douglas; Glynn Turman
- Cinematography: John L. Demps Jr.
- Edited by: Quinnie Martin Jr.
- Music by: Terrence Blanchard
- Production company: Touchstone Pictures
- Distributed by: Buena Vista Pictures Distribution
- Release date: April 22, 1994
- Running time: 110 minutes
- Country: United States
- Language: English
- Budget: $8 million
- Box office: $8.9 million

The Inkwell is a 1994 romantic comedy-drama film directed by Matty Rich. The film stars Larenz Tate, Joe Morton, Suzzanne Douglass, Glynn Turman, Jada Pinkett and Vanessa Bell Calloway.

== Plot ==
Set in the summer of 1976, the film follows the adventures of Drew Tate (Larenz Tate), a 16-year-old from upstate New York, when he and his family spend two weeks with affluent relatives on Martha's Vineyard. Drew's parents, Kenny (Joe Morton) and Brenda (Suzzanne Douglass), worry that their son is emotionally disturbed. His favorite companion is a doll, in which he names Iago (after the character in William Shakespeare's Othello), with which he engages in animated conversations. They also fear that a fire he accidentally set in the family garage foreshadows a future as an arsonist.

On Martha's Vineyard, Drew is thrown into an affluent, party-loving Black society that congregates on a beach known as the Inkwell. The visit is also the occasion of some bitter family strife. Drew's Aunt Frances (Vanessa Bell Calloway) and her husband, Spencer (Glynn Turman), are conservatives whose walls are plastered with pictures of Republican dignitaries such as Barry Goldwater and Ronald Reagan (who they keep saying will become president someday). Kenny, a former Black Panther, and Spencer argue furiously about racial issues.

The Inkwell follows Drew's bumbling pursuit of the insufferably snooty Lauren (Jada Pinkett). He also befriends Heather (Adrienne-Joi Johnson), a young woman whose husband, Harold (Morris Chestnut), is a faithless louse. The movie comes to an end on the Fourth of July, when the Bicentennial fireworks end up symbolizing not just America's 200th birthday but Drew finally having sex with Heather.

== Cast ==
- Larenz Tate as Drew Tate
- Joe Morton as Kenny Tate
- Suzzanne Douglass as Brenda Tate
- Glynn Turman as Spencer Phillips
- Vanessa Bell Calloway as Frances Phillips
- Adrienne-Joi Johnson as Heather Lee
- Morris Chestnut as Harold Lee
- Jada Pinkett as Lauren Kelly
- Duane Martin as Junior Phillips
- Mary Alice as Evelyn
- Phyllis Yvonne Stickney as Dr. Wade
- Markus Redmond as Darryl
- Perry Moore as Moe
- Akia Victor as Charlene
- Jade as The New York Dream Machine

== Production ==
For the 20th anniversary of the film, the cast reunited with writer/filmmaker Lathleen Ade-Brown for Essence where Larenz Tate spoke about the casting process. He told the magazine "Matty Rich was holding auditions in L.A. Jada [Pinkett Smith] was already cast in the role [as Lauren] and I remember her calling me, saying, ‘You got to do this movie!’ In fact, she was saying, ‘Listen, let’s meet up and rehearse because they are going to want me to read with you, so let’s rehearse, so you totally land it!’ I told her, ‘I’m going to rip that role! No need to rehearse, you just keep up with me and we just play off each other.’ She says. ‘I got you, let’s do it!’ I go in the audition and we really just lit up the room, then I had to audition solo. They didn't know what to expect considering I just did Menace II Society playing O-Dawg, a completely street person. So that impressed them and they offered me the part."

== Reception ==
The Inkwell was poorly received by critics. It holds a rating of 22% on Rotten Tomatoes based on 9 reviews. It has since become a cult classic.
