= The Theatre School at DePaul University =

University-affiliated theater school in Chicago

Coordinates: 41°55′29.2″N 87°39′31.6″W

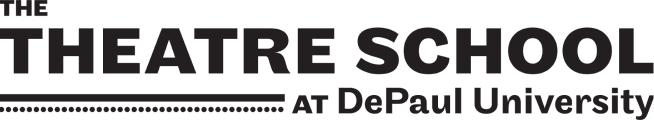
- Former name: Goodman School of Drama
- Type: Private
- Established: 1925
- Parent institution: School of the Art Institute of Chicago (1925–1978); DePaul University (1978–present)
- Dean: Martine Green-Rogers
- Location: Chicago, Illinois, US
- Website: theatre.depaul.edu

The Theatre School at DePaul University, previously the Goodman School of Drama (also known as TTS and GSD, respectively) is the drama school of DePaul University. Originally associated with the Goodman Theatre, its first class was conducted at the Art Institute of Chicago in 1925. The school officially became part of DePaul University in 1978, and was renamed The Theatre School at DePaul University in 1982. It moved to its location at Lincoln Park in 2013.

The Theatre School enrolls approximately 450 students. The Theatre School's main performance spaces are the Merle Reskin Theatre (formerly Blackstone Theatre) in Downtown Chicago, the Healy BlackBox theatre, and the Watts Theater in the Lincoln Park Campus.

== Academics ==
The Theatre School is organized in three departments with the following degrees are currently on offer:

Design/Technology

1. Bachelor of Fine Arts in Costume Design, Costume Technology, Lighting Design, Projection Design, Scenic Design, Sound Design, Stage Management, Theatre Technology, and Wig and Makeup Design

Performance

1. Bachelor of Fine Arts in Acting
2. Master of Fine Arts in Acting and Directing

Theatre Studies

1. Bachelor of Fine Arts in Comedy Arts, Dramaturgy/Criticism, Playwriting, Theatre Arts (with possible concentrations in Directing and Theatre for Young Audiences), and Theatre Management
2. Master of Fine Arts in Arts Leadership

The Theatre School produces over two dozen public theatrical productions and nearly forty total productions each season. The Theatre School Showcase Series features contemporary and classic plays, while the Chicago Playworks for Families and Young Audiences presents plays for children. Other mainstage productions include the New Directors Series (MFA Directing theses) and the New Playwrights Series (BFA Playwriting pieces).

== Notable alumni ==
=== Goodman School of Drama at the School of the Art Institute of Chicago (1925–1978) ===
- Theoni V. Aldredge (BFA Costume Design, 1952)
- Shelley Berman (Acting)
- Bruce Boxleitner (Certificate Acting, 1971)
- Melinda Dillon (Acting)
- Dennis Dugan (BFA Acting, 1969)
- Scott Ellis (BFA Acting, 1978)
- Joel Fink (BFA Acting)
- Charles Fleischer (Acting)
- Gloria Foster (Acting)
- Dennis Grimaldi (BFA Acting, 1969)
- Linda Hunt (BFA Acting, 1966)
- Barry Kelley (Acting)
- Harvey Korman (Acting)
- Eugene Lee (BFA Scenic Design, 1964)
- Joe Mantegna (BFA Acting, 1967–1969)
- Lois Nettleton (Acting)
- Geraldine Page (BFA Acting, 1945)
- Betsy Palmer (Acting)
- Shauneille Perry (MFA Directing, 1952)
- José Quintero (BFA Acting, 1949)
- Steve Smith (BFA Acting, 1977)
- Carrie Snodgress (Acting)
- Concetta Tomei (BFA Acting, 1975)
- John Towey (BFA Directing, 1967)
- Sam Wanamaker (Acting, 1938)
- Ted Wass (BFA Acting)
- Howard Witt (Certificate Acting, 1967)
- Charlayne Woodard (BFA Acting, 1974–1977)
- Louis Zorich (BFA Acting, 1958

=== Goodman School of Drama at DePaul University (1978–1982) ===
- Tom Amandes (Certificate Acting, 1981)
- Kevin Anderson (Certificate Acting, 1981)
- Ann Dowd (MFA Acting, 1982)
- Elizabeth Perkins (Certificate Acting, 1981)
- Michael Rooker (BFA Acting, 1982)
- Andrzej Szczytko (1980)

=== The Theatre School at DePaul University (1982–present) ===
- Aaron Abrams (BFA Acting, 2001)
- Gillian Anderson (BFA Acting, 1990)
- Kevin Bigley (BFA Acting, 2009)
- W. Earl Brown (MFA Acting, 1989)
- Julianne Buescher (BFA Acting, 1989)
- P. J. Byrne (MFA Acting, 1999)
- John Cabrera (BFA Acting, 1997)
- Paula Cale (BFA Acting, 1993)
- Monique Coleman (BFA Acting, 2002)
- David Dastmalchian (BFA Acting, 1999)
- Glenn Davis (BFA Acting, 2004)
- Heather Gilbert (MFA Lighting Design, 1997)
- Eli Goodman (BFA Acting, 1988–1990)
- Judy Greer (BFA Acting, 1997)
- Sean Gunn (BFA Acting, 1996)
- Jeremy O. Harris (BFA Acting, 2009–2010)
- Kimberly Hébert Gregory (MFA Acting, attended)
- Levi Holloway (BFA Acting, 2005)
- John Hoogenakker (BFA Acting, 1999)
- Zach Helm (BFA Acting, 1996)
- Ike Holter (BFA Playwriting, 2007)
- Lisa Joyce (BFA Acting, 2004)
- Stana Katic (MFA Acting, 2000–2002)
- Lisa Robin Kelly (BFA Acting, 1992)
- Joe Keery (BFA Acting, 2014)
- Alexander Koch (BFA Acting, 2012)
- KiKi Layne (BFA Acting, 2014)
- Denny Love (BFA Acting, 2015)
- Adam Mayfield (BFA Acting, 2000)
- Tarell Alvin McCraney (BFA Acting, 2003)
- Cynthia McWilliams (BFA Acting, 2003)
- Frank Merle (BFA Playwriting, 2001)
- Michael Muhney (BFA Acting, 1997)
- Tawny Newsome (BFA Acting, 2006)
- Kevin O'Connor (BFA Acting, 1985)
- Zak Orth (BFA Acting, 1992)
- Caitlin Montanye Parrish (BFA Theatre Studies, 2006)
- Dewayne Perkins (BFA Acting, left)
- Amy Pietz (BFA Acting, 1991)
- John C. Reilly (BFA Acting, 1983–1987)
- Leonard Roberts (BFA Acting, 1995)
- Ashton Sanders (BFA Acting, 2013–2016)
- Casey Siemaszko (BFA Acting, 1983)
- Nina Siemaszko (Acting)
- Sam Straley (BFA Acting, 2017)
- Lili Taylor (Acting)

== See also ==
- Goodman Theatre
