= The Wall (1998 American film) =

1998 American television anthology film

- Written by: Scott Abbott; Charles Fuller; Patrick Sheane Duncan
- Directed by: Joseph Sargent
- Starring: Edward James Olmos; Savion Glover; Ruby Dee; Frank Whaley; Michael DeLorenzo
- Music by: Larry Brown
- Country of origin: United States
- Original language: English

Production
- Producer: Edgar J. Scherick
- Cinematography: Donald M. Morgan
- Running time: 95 minutes

Original release
- Network: Showtime
- Release: May 24, 1998

The Wall is a 1998 made-for-TV anthology film that first aired on Showtime on May 24, 1998.

== Premise ==
The film told three separate stories based on items left at the Vietnam Memorial.

== Cast ==
=== The Pencil Holder ===
- Edward James Olmos as Colonel Holst
- Richard Chevolleau as Timothy Mullen
- Dean McDermott as Captain Allen
- Trevor Blumas as Ben Holst
  - Todd Dulmage as Older Ben Holst

=== The Badge ===
- Savion Glover as Bracey Mitchell
- Ruby Dee as Mrs. Mitchell
- Martin Roach as Calvin
- Karen Robinson as Liz
- Tommy Chang as Lead VC

=== The Player ===
- Frank Whaley as Bishop
- Michael DeLorenzo as Luis
- Ron White as Broadaxe
- Matthew Ferguson as Buelton
- Sergio Di Zio as Olivern
- Kim Roberts as Wall Woman
