= Michael DeLorenzo =

American actor

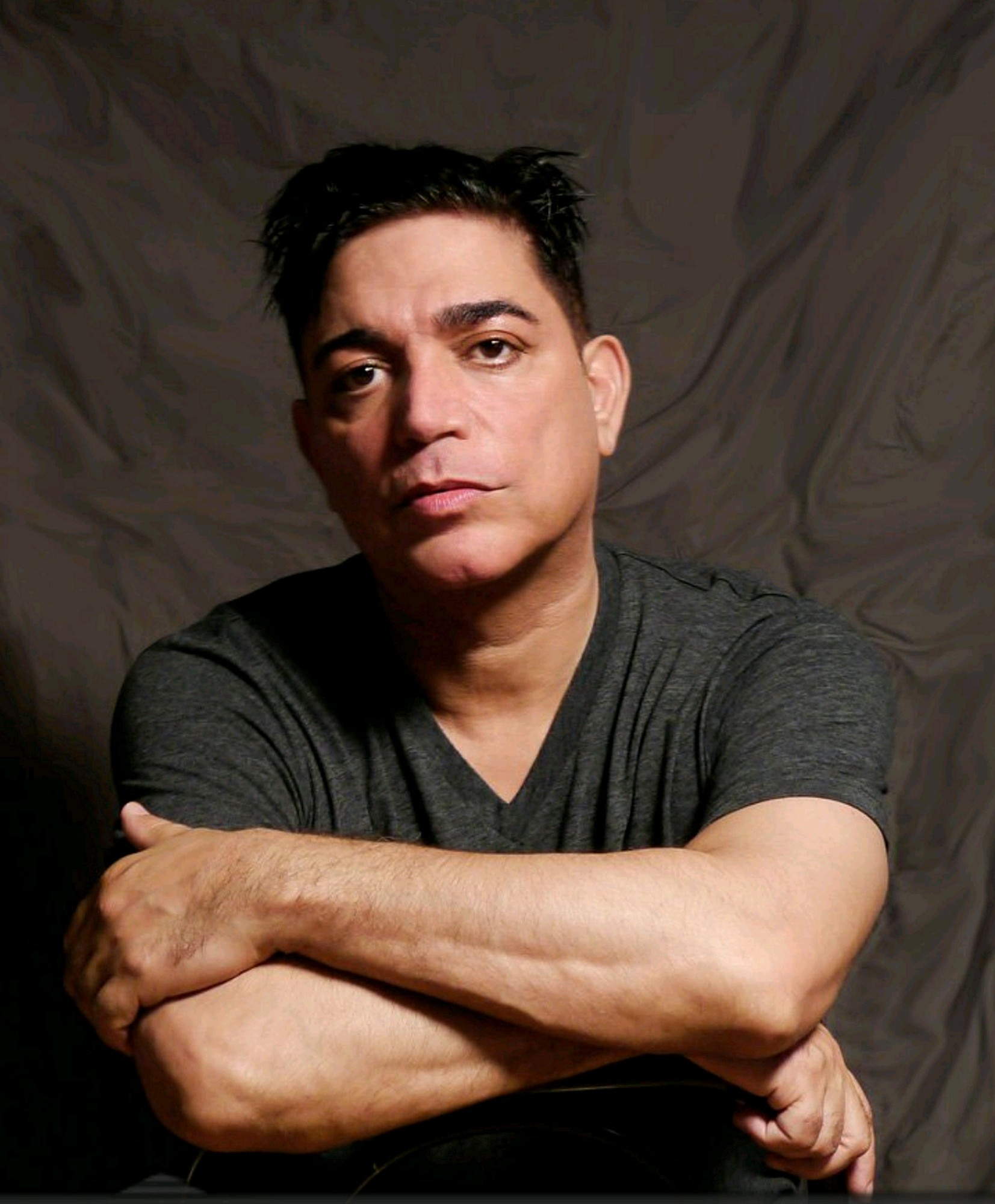
- DeLorenzo in 2017
- Born: 1959 or 1960 (age 66–67); New York City, U.S.
- Occupations: Actor; director; writer; producer; musician; dancer
- Years active: 1978–present
- Website: michaeldelorenzo.com

Michael DeLorenzo (born 1959 or 1960) is an American actor, director, writer, producer, dancer, and musician. He is known for his work in television and film.

== Early life and education ==
DeLorenzo was raised in The Bronx, New York. His late father, Arthur DeLorenzo, was of Italian descent and his late mother, Carmen DeLorenzo, was from Puerto Rico. DeLorenzo is the second eldest of four children. He has one sister and two brothers.

DeLorenzo first began performing at a young age as a dancer with Tina Ramirez's Ballet Hispanico. DeLorenzo went on to receive various scholarships from the School of American Ballet, the Joffrey Ballet and the New York School of Ballet. He danced alongside Rudolph Nureyev and the National Ballet of Canada. DeLorenzo performed with Mikhail Baryshnikov and the American Ballet Theatre. He went on to attend the Manhattan-based High School of Performing Arts, made famous by the movie and television series Fame. He danced with Richard Thomas' U.S. Terpsichore Ballet Company, but suffered a serious dance injury forcing him to leave a career in professional ballet.

== Career ==
=== Actor ===
DeLorenzo has acted on the stage, in film, and on television. One of DeLorenzo's first acting roles was on stage in the Broadway revival of West Side Story, appearing as one of the members of the Sharks street gang. He then moved on to appear in the 1980 movie Fame and the television show Fame (1982–1987) as a series regular. DeLorenzo appeared in television shows such as Miami Vice and A Different World. and appeared in movies such as Fast Forward (1985) directed by Sidney Poitier. DeLorenzo continued to work on Broadway appearing in the musical Streetheat in 1985. DeLorenzo worked with Michael Jackson and Lionel Richie. He appeared in Jackson's music video "Beat It", and in Lionel Richie's music video "Running with the Night", "Ballerina Girl", and "Dancing on the Ceiling". He appeared in other music videos and dance performances such as Alexander O'Neal's "Fake". He danced in Chaka Khan's performance of "I Feel for You" at the 1985 Grammy Awards.

DeLorenzo won a Drama-Logue Award for Best Actor in a play at the Mark Taper Forum titled Stand Up Tragedy with a performance portraying five different roles (1989). For his performance on the stage, he was tapped by the producers of the ABC sitcom Head of the Class to star as Alex Torres, alongside Howard Hesseman joining the last two seasons of the series (1989–1991). In 1994, DeLorenzo played the role of Detective Eddie Torres, the brooding cop with a heart in Dick Wolf's urban police drama TV series New York Undercover. This was the first time in American television history featuring two people of color (DeLorenzo and fellow actor Malik Yoba) in the starring roles in a prime time drama. For his performance, DeLorenzo was awarded the NCLR American Latino Media Arts (ALMA) Award for Outstanding Actor in a Drama Series in 1996 and 1998. DeLorenzo went on to star in the Showtime drama Resurrection Blvd., playing embittered boxing champion Carlos Santiago. For his performance, DeLorenzo won the Imagen Award for Best Actor and the Vision Award for Best Performance in Drama.

DeLorenzo has appeared in numerous movies including Rob Reiner's drama A Few Good Men (1992) as Pfc. William T. Santiago, as Rafael Cano in Alive (1993), in My Family (1995) as Butch Mejia, The Wall (1998) as Luis. and many others (refer to Filmography below). DeLorenzo continues to act in other notable film and TV shows such as CSI: NY, Numb3rs, Ghost Whisperer and CSI: Miami. DeLorenzo also appeared in various independent feature films. On May 25, 2013, he won the award for Best Supporting Actor at the Los Angeles Movie Awards for his role as Keith Caverns in The Employer. In 2016, DeLorenzo took on the role of the complex and entangled paraplegic witness Fausto in the CBS police procedural drama Blue Bloods (episode titled Mob Rules, fourth episode of the seventh season). He played José Sarria, a political LGBT activist in the Academy Award-winner Dustin Lance Black's When We Rise (2017), directed by Gus Van Sant.

=== Director ===
DeLorenzo is a director and a member of the Directors Guild of America. While at Showtime, DeLorenzo directed episodes of Resurrection Blvd. He has directed and produced films and short films. He also directed music videos that featured new and upcoming artists.

=== Musician ===
DeLorenzo is also a vocalist, songwriter, composer, and multi-instrumentalist. He plays the guitar, drums and piano. He partnered with an R&B girl group called Teen Dream, under the moniker "Valentino" and released the single "Get Busy" (1987). In the mid-to-late 1990s, during his tenure on New York Undercover, some of his songs appeared on the show—one of them titled, "Don't Let Me Be Lonely Tonight". His songs also have appeared on Showtime's Resurrection Blvd. DeLorenzo co-wrote "Angel", a song for The Sims 2. In 2009, his album Rescue Me was released.

== Filmography ==
=== Film ===
Year	Title	Role	Notes
1978	Slipping Into Darkness	Soldier	
1980	Fame	Principal Dancer	
1983	The Kids from Fame: live at the Royal Albert Hall	Himself/Fame Dancer	Documentary
1984	Breakin' Through	Dancer	TV movie
1985	Fast Forward	Caesar Lopez	
1985	HeartBeat	Bobby	TV movie
1987	Sister Margaret and the Saturday Night Ladies	Miguel	TV movie
1987	Fatal Beauty	Flaco	
1988	The Couch Trip	Lopez	
1988	Satisfaction	"Bunny" Slotz	
1988	Police Story: Cop Killer	Young Driver	TV movie
1988	Platoon Leader	Private Raymond Bacera	
1990	Cold Dog Soup	Gang Leader	
1992	Diggstown	Paulo	
1992	A Few Good Men	Private First Class William T. Santiago	
1993	Alive	Rafael Cano	
1993	Judgment Night	Teddy	
1994	Pointman	Julio Alvarez	TV movie
1994	Somebody to Love	Ernesto	
1994	Count on Me	-	TV movie
1995	My Family	Butch Mejia	
1998	Phantoms	Velazquez, Soldier	
1998	The Wall	Luis	TV movie
1998	Zero Stress	Javier	
2000	Gun Shy	Estuvio Clavo	
2001	Border Patrol	Detective Freddie Chavez	TV movie
2004	In Your Eyes	Sergio Espinoza	
2006	High Hopes	Rocko	
2007	Safe Harbour	Bob	
2009	Not Forgotten	Casper Navarro	
2009	La Linea	Pablo	
2009	Contradictions of the Heart	Diego	Video
2012	186 Dollars to Freedom	Gutierrez	
2013	The Employer	Keith Caverns	
2017	The Babymoon	Ray Lopez	
2018	Johnny Gruesome	Charlie Grissom	
2020	Be the Light	Ramon	

=== Television ===
Year	Title	Role	Notes
1982–87	Fame	Michael	Recurring cast: seasons 1-3, guest: season 6
1985	Miami Vice	Salvatore Lombard/Dogfight Gambler	Episode: "Lombard" & "Junk Love"
1987	Ohara	Curry	Episode: "Jesse"
1987	The Bronx Zoo	Salvatore Guiterrez	Recurring cast: season 1
1987	What's Happening Now!!	Tiger	Episode: "The Boxer"
1987	The Tracey Ullman Show	Painter/Dancer	Episode: "Episode #2.5"
1987	Crime Story	Roberto Mendoza	Episode: "Love Hurts"
1988	The Dirty Dozen	Paco Fuentes	Episode: "Danko's Dozen"
1988	A Different World	Ramon Duarte	Episode: "If You Like Pilgrim Coladas"
1989–91	Head of the Class	Alex Torres	Main cast: seasons 4-5
1992	Angel Street	Hector	Episode: "Midnight Times a Hundred"
1993	The Adventures of Brisco County, Jr.	Emilio Pena	Episode: "Brisco in Jalisco"
1994–97	New York Undercover	Detective Eddie Torres	Main cast: seasons 1-3
2000–02	Resurrection Blvd.	Carlos Santiago	Main cast
2004	All of Us	Antonio	Episode: "It Takes Three to Tango"
2005	Crossing Jordan	Stranger	Episode: "A Stranger Among Us"
2006	CSI: NY	Rico Cerda	Episode: "Cool Hunter"
2007	Numb3rs	Nacio Duque	Episode: "One Hour"
2007	Ghost Whisperer	Richard Sanchez	Episode: "Haunted Hero"
2008	CSI: Miami	Carlos Santiago	Episode: "Tunnel Vision"
2016	Unsung Hollywood	Himself	Episode: "New York Undercover"
2016	Blue Bloods	Fausto	Episode: "Mob Rules"
2017	When We Rise	José Sarria	Episode: "Night I: Part I"
2022	S.W.A.T.	Ernie Delgado	Episode: Guacaine

=== Music videos ===
Year	Song	Artist
1983	"Beat It"	Michael Jackson
1983	"Thriller"	Michael Jackson
1983	"Running with the Night"	Lionel Richie
1986	"Dancing on the Ceiling"	Lionel Richie
1986	"Ballerina Girl"	Lionel Richie
1986	"Let's Get Busy"	Teen Dream
1987	"Fake"	Alexander O’Neal
1987	"Catch Me (I'm Falling)"	Pretty Poison

=== Video games ===
Year	Game	Role	Notes
2018	"Fallout 76: Wastelanders"	Cole Carver, Raf, Rudy Fernandez	

=== Stage ===
- "Fool For Love" at the Madrid Theatre
- "Stand Up Tragedy" at the Mark Taper Forum, Los Angeles, CA (1989)
- "Streetheat" on Broadway, New York City (1985)
- "Tumbleweed" at the Los Angeles Theatre Center, Los Angeles
- "West Side Story" on Broadway, New York City
- "Paperbird" in New York City
- "Aria Dacapa" in New York City
- "What Became of Us," Signature Theatre, Washington D.C. (2026)

== Discography ==
=== Rescue Me (2009) ===
Track No.	Title
1	Together
2	No Reason Why
3	Lay Me Down
4	Give You More
5	On & On
6	Rescue Me
7	Luv 2 Luv U
8	Without You
9	Hang On
10	Lay Me Down (Spanish Version)

=== Video game ===
- The Sims 2: Castaway (2007), "Angel" – co-written by DeLorenzo

=== TV soundtracks ===
- New York Undercover TV Soundtrack Album (1998), Track No. 5: "Don't Let Me Be Lonely Tonight"
- Resurrection Blvd. TV Soundtrack Album (2000), Track No. 12: "On & On"
- In Your Eyes TV Soundtrack Album (2004), "Lay Me Down (Spanish Version)"
