= John Towey =

American actor

- John Towey (2002 photo)
- Born: John Madden Towey; February 13, 1940 (age 86); Rochester, Minnesota, U.S.
- Education: Saint John's University; Art Institute of Chicago (BFA)
- Spouse(s): Delores Techeau (1963–1974); Henrietta Valor (1982–2007 [deceased]); Tylie Jones (2014–Present)

John Madden Towey (born February 13, 1940) is an American actor. He studied acting and directing at the Goodman Theatre in Chicago. He received B.F.A. degree in directing in 1967. Acted two seasons at the Arena Stage in Washington D.C. (1977–78 and 1981). Acted two seasons at the Guthrie Theatre in Minneapolis (1984–1986) and two seasons at The Public Theater in New York 1987-89, before moving to Los Angeles in 1990. A classically trained pianist, John has performed over 100 programs since 2001 at grade schools in the Los Angeles Unified School District. The program is an introduction to classical music entitled, Piano Masters. He also gives piano concerts at retirement homes throughout Southern California.

== Background ==
Towey was born in Rochester, Minnesota, to Helen Madden and Robert F. Towey, an undertaker in business with his brother Richard L. Towey. Towey's father was the son of John H. Towey, who started the funeral business in Stewartville, Minnesota in the beginning of the 20th century. Towey served in the Army during the Vietnam War and was stationed for a time in San Juan, Puerto Rico. Prior to entering the Army he attended Saint John's University in Collegeville, Minnesota and subsequently moved to Chicago to attend the Goodman School of Drama at the Art Institute of Chicago (now at DePaul University).

== Film ==
- Cries of Silence (1996)
- Fearless (1993)
- Another Woman (1988)
- The Invisible Kid (1988)
- Half Life (1987)
- Bill (1981)
- Christmas Evil (1980).

== Television ==
- American Dreams (2003)
- Crossing Jordan (2002)
- The Practice (2000)
- Port Charles (2000)
- The X-Files (1998)
- Martial Law (1998)
- ER (1998)
- Star Trek: Deep Space Nine (1997)
- Cracker (1997)
- General Hospital (1997)
- Picket Fences (1996)
- Alienation:Millennium (1996)
- Party of Five (1996)
- Murder One (1995)
- From the Mixed-Up Files of Mrs. Basil E. Frankweiler (1995)
- The Single Guy (1994)
- Sirens (1994)
- Burke's Law (1993)
- Hangin' with Mr. Cooper (1993)
- Empty Nest (1993)
- Dream On (1992)
- W.I.O.U. (1992)
- L.A. Law (5 episodes) (1991–93)
- Fresh Prince of Bel Air (1990)
- Murphy Brown (1990)
- Tales from the Crypt (1990)
- One Life to Live (1989)
- Love, Sidney (1988)
- Spenser: For Hire (1987)
- Amerika (mini-series) (1987)
- Ryan's Hope (1987)
- As the World Turns (1987)
- Love of Life (1974)
- You Are There (1970)
- Hidden Faces (1969)

== Theatre ==
He appeared on Broadway in Amadeus (1999–2000) playing Giuseppi Bonno, directed by Sir Peter Hall. Off-Broadway he appeared in My Heart is in the East (1983), God Bless You, Mr. Rosewater (1979), Fashion (1974), A Dream Out of Time (1970), Arf and the Great Airplane Snatch (1969), To Be Young, Gifted, and Black (1969). At the New York Shakespeare Festival, he appeared in Cymbeline (1989), The Winter's Tale (1989), Coriolanus (1988), Romeo & Juliet (1988), Julius Caesar (1987), and Talk Radio (1986). At the Guthrie Theatre in Minneapolis he appeared in The Rainmaker (1986), Candida (1986), On the Razzle (1986), Execution of Justice (1986), Cyrano (1985), A Midsummer Night's Dream (1985), Great Expectations (1985), A Christmas Carol (1984), Twelfth Night (1984), and Three Sisters (1984).
