= Train Ride =

2000 film directed by Rel Dowdell

- DVD cover for Train Ride
- Directed by: Rel Dowdell
- Written by: Rel Dowdell
- Starring: Wood Harris; MC Lyte; Esther Rolle
- Distributed by: Sony
- Release date: 2000
- Running time: 93 minutes
- Country: United States
- Language: English

Train Ride is a feature thriller film written and directed by Rel Dowdell and Executive Produced by Rich Murray. It was released in 2005 by Murray's RuffNation Films via Sony Entertainment. It revolves around the consequences of an incident of date rape on a college campus in Philadelphia (Cheyney University of Pa.), and stars Wood Harris, MC Lyte, Russell Hornsby, Thomas Braxton Jr., Guru, Joe Clair, KaDee Strickland, and Emmy Award–winning actress Esther Rolle. The film was shot in 1998, though financing problems derailed the post-production process. Philadelphia company RuffNation Films supervised and funded the films completion. It debuted theatrically in Philadelphia in 2005 to positive reviews and a very successful DVD release followed.

Train Ride was Esther Rolle's last film before her death on November 17, 1998, and the film is dedicated to her.

Train Ride was shot on the campus of Cheyney University, which is the oldest African American college in the United States.

The film recently got high praise by noted film historian/critic Irv Slifkin in his best-selling book Filmadelphia: A Celebration of a City's Movies, which was published by Middle Atlantic Press in 2006.

In addition, the film recently ranked #5 in the top ten "Best College Movies" on BET.COM.
