= Geneva Film Festival =

Film festival in Illinois, United States

- Location: Geneva, Illinois, United States
- Founded: 2007
- Website: http://www.genevafilmfestival.org

The Geneva Film Festival is an annual event that takes place in Geneva, Illinois. The festival shows films from around the world and puts on a workshop for those interested in the technical aspects of the film making process.

== Official selections ==
=== 2014 ===
==== Narrative Shorts ====
- Crossings
- December
- Grey Route
- November Lights
- North Hollywood
- The Uncles (Gli Zii)
- My forest
- Masque
- Tess
- Sundays
- God's Got His Head in the Clouds
- One Safe / Directed by Gaetano Naccarato
- My forest / Directed by Sebastien Pins
- North Hollywood / Directed by Bob Stephenson
- Pain Staking / Directed by Adolfo Martinez Perez
- Scotty Works OUT / Directed by Dan Pal (People’s Choice Award for Best Narrative Short)
- You Will Find Me Within You

=== 2013 ===
==== Animated Shorts ====
- Light Me Up (Best Animated Short)

==== Documentary Feature ====
- Mayan Blue (Best Documentary Feature, Best Cinematography)
- Refuge: Stories of the Selfhelp Home (Emerging Documentary Filmmaker)

==== Documentary Shorts ====
- The Storykeeper (Best Documentary Short)

==== Narrative Feature ====
- Salt (Best Narrative Feature)
- The Employer (Emerging Feature Filmmaker)

==== Narrative Shorts ====
- A House, A Home (Best Narrative Short)

==== Student Shorts ====
- A Quest For Peace: Nonviolence Among Religions (Young Filmmaker Spotlight)
- Shoot the Moon (Student Visionary Award)

=== 2012 ===
==== Animated Shorts ====
- Secret Life of Objects - Outhouse
- Luna
- Being Bradford Dillman

==== Documentary Feature ====
- Wolves Unleashed
- Generation Baby Buster

==== Documentary Shorts ====
- The Trap of Saving Cambodia
- Mugs
- Dilli
- Carbon for Water

==== Narrative Feature ====
- Pearls of the Far East
- Tag und Nacht

==== Narrative Shorts ====
- Salvaging
- Parlay
- Kavinsky
- 1848
- Amok
- All You Need is Love
- They Walk Among Us
- The World Turns
- The Runnder
- The Small Assassin
- Lifeless
- Hath No Man
- Deep Blue Breath
- Callum
- Buon Giorno Sayonara

=== 2007 ===
Year	Dates	Venue
2013	March 28–30	State Street Dance Studio
2012	March	State Street Dance Studio
2011		Riverside Receptions
