= All Gone Wrong =

- Directed by: Josh Guffey
- Written by: Josh Guffey
- Produced by: Barry Albrecht; Josh Guffey; Michael Kennedy; Frank Merle
- Starring: Jake Kaufman; Tony Todd
- Cinematography: Levi Kirby
- Edited by: Bret Hoy
- Production companies: Lone Morsel Productions; Propulsion Films; Vidzu Media
- Distributed by: Buffalo 8 Productions
- Release date: November 2021 (St. Louis)
- Country: United States
- Language: English

All Gone Wrong is a 2021 American crime film written and directed by Josh Guffey and starring Jake Kaufman and Tony Todd. It is Guffey's feature directorial debut.

== Plot ==
After a rookie undercover cop is gunned down in a drug bust gone wrong, the veteran agent in-charge is put on leave and begins an unauthorized investigation into the failed deal, leading him to a pervasive drug network operating under the surface in a rural town.

== Cast ==
- Jake Kaufman as Chris Halvorsen
- Tony Todd as Lamont Hughes
- Antonio St. James as Anthony Haron
- Pete Winfrey as Mikey
- Peter Mayer as Captain Jim Grace
- Jaan Marion as Junkie J
- Law X as Goldy

== Production ==
Principal photography occurred in 2019 and the film was independently funded through Kickstarter. The film was shot in St. Louis and Granite City, Illinois.

== Release ==
The film premiered at the St. Louis International Film Festival in November 2021. It was then released on streaming services on January 27, 2023.

== Reception ==
Julian Roman of MovieWeb gave the film a negative review and wrote, "The pieces work on an individual level but fail to come together in a compelling way. The film unfolds in a derivative manner we've seen before countless times."
