= 2 Jennifer =

- Directed by: Hunter Johnson
- Written by: Hunter Johnson
- Produced by: Christian Ackerman; Jarrett Furst; Hunter Johnson; Frank Merle
- Starring: Hunter Johnson; David Coupe; Lara Jean Mummert
- Cinematography: Hunter Johnson
- Edited by: Frank Merle
- Music by: Mo Bluntz
- Production companies: LAHorror.com; Sector 5 Films
- Distributed by: Gravitas Ventures; Reality Entertainment; Sector 5 Films
- Release date: June 3, 2016
- Running time: 84 minutes
- Country: United States
- Language: English

2 Jennifer is a 2016 American indie horror film written and directed by Hunter Johnson, who also stars in the film. The film is a sequel to James Cullen Bressack's To Jennifer and features Johnson as a young man intent on creating a sequel to the 2013 film. The film also features David Coupe and Lara Jean Mummert.

== Synopsis ==
Spencer wants to create a sequel to one of his favorite horror films, To Jennifer, and is hoping that doing so will launch his career as a filmmaker. As such, he is playing one of the movie's main characters and wants to find the perfect woman to serve as the film's titular character, even going so far as to insist that they only consider actresses that are named Jennifer. However as they find their perfect Jennifer and filming commences, Spencer's hold on reality grows more and more tenuous.

== Cast ==
- Hunter Johnson as Spencer
- David Coupe as Mack
- Lara Jean Mummert as Jennifer
- Felissa Rose as Jennifer Smith
- Erin Marie Hogan as Jennifer Johnson
- Veronica Ricci as Jennifer Martin
- Jody Barton as Jody
- James Cullen Bressack as James
- Jarrett Furst as Jarrett
- Josh Brown as Josh
- Charles Chudabala as Charlie
- Matt Holbrook as Dennis
- Chrissy Cannone as Susan
- Marv Blauvelt as Thumper
- Erin Killean as Jennifer Corby

== Reception ==
Starburst wrote a favorable review of the film, as they felt that it was "refreshing to have a sequel work so well and for it actually not be essential that one has seen the original. Ultimately, it’s a more enjoyable ride than the first, with a payoff that packs quite a wallop."

In contrast, Dread Central panned 2 Jennifer, stating that "Fans of bargain-basement snuff will eat this one right up, but for this lad, I prefer to keep my eyesight on level ground... solid, stable, non-shaky ground."
