= From Jennifer =

- Directed by: Frank Merle
- Written by: Frank Merle
- Produced by: Frank Merle; Hunter Johnson
- Starring: Danielle Taddei; Tony Todd; Derek Mears; Aaron Abrams; Meghan Deanna Smith
- Music by: Kevin MacLeod
- Production company: Lone Morsel Productions
- Distributed by: Sector 5 Films
- Release date: September 26, 2017
- Running time: 85 minutes
- Country: United States
- Language: English

From Jennifer, sometimes stylized as #FromJennifer, is a 2017 comedy horror film written and directed by Frank Merle. The film stars Danielle Taddei and Derek Mears as an unlikely duo plotting to become internet celebrities by filming and posting an outrageous revenge plot.

On October 17, 2016, it was announced by The Hollywood Reporter that horror icon Tony Todd, best known for playing Candyman was joining the cast as Jennifer's manager Chad Wolfe.

When the first trailer was posted on January 19, 2017 by the Horror Society, it was confirmed that the cast included Derek Mears, best known as Jason Voorhees in 2009's Friday the 13th and Aaron Abrams from TV's Hannibal and Blindspot. The title character is played by Danielle Taddei, whose past work includes Pretty Little Liars and Everybody Hates Chris.

From Jennifer is a stand-alone film, connected to To Jennifer by title and thematic elements only. James Cullen Bressack is credited as an executive producer on From Jennifer.

The hashtag stylized title references the title character's obsession with internet fame.

== Plot ==
Jennifer Peterson (Danielle Taddei) is having a very rough week. She's been fired from a movie shoot, her manager just dropped her, and her boyfriend (Aaron Abrams) dumped her, but not before releasing a sex tape of them together. But Jennifer has decided to turn things around: she hatches a plot she calls 'Revenge Porn Revenge,' in which she plans to settle the score by filming a devastatingly elaborate video and posting it online, making herself famous in the process. But like everything else in her life lately, her revenge plot doesn't go according to plan, and a shocking trail of carnage is left in her wake.

== Cast ==
- Danielle Taddei as Jennifer Peterson
- Tony Todd as Chad Wolfe
- Derek Mears as Butch Valentine
- Aaron Abrams as Ralph Sinclair
- Meghan Deanna Smith as Stephanie Hart
- Trae Ireland as Robert Brown
- Neil Garguilo as Gavin Trask
- Kurt Maloney as Todd
- Justin Michael Terry as Adam
- Travis Richardson as Owen
- Ryan Marsico as Phil
- Christopher Mathieu as Jerry
- Devin Reeve as Slick
- Curtis Kingsley as Victor
- Jason Murphy as Gil
- Jenny Brezinski as Fredricka
- Keith Korneluk as Harold
- Mike Capes as Eddie

== Release ==
The film's first public appearance was as the headlining feature at the 2017 Illinois International Film Festival, where it won the award for Best Director. It has since screened at many other film festivals and has won several additional awards, including Best Supporting Actor (Tony Todd) and Best Horror/Comedy at the Festigious Film Festival, Best Horror/Comedy at the Los Angeles Film Awards, the Audience Choice Award at the Los Angeles Movie Awards, Best Narrative Feature and Best Actress (Danielle Taddei) at the Mindfield Film Festival.

It had a limited theatrical run beginning on September 19, 2017 followed by a cable and digital release on September 26, 2017 with a DVD release on February 13, 2018. The DVD includes deleted scenes, alternate opening and closing scenes, outtakes and a director's commentary track.

== Reception ==
Reviews of the film have been overall positive, with the highest praise being for the performances and the high-concept script. Horror Society wrote "obsession and revenge never looked so good" and gave the film 9/10. Dread Central gave the film four stars, especially praising Tony Todd "in a glorious horror comeback role that will make you shiver and laugh." Sinful Celluloid wrote "if you’re a thrill seeker and a horror junky I definitely recommend that you watch this and explore your inner psycho." PopHorror.com wrote "this film is a great freaking time, do yourself a favor and see it."
