= Larenz Tate =

American actor (born 1975)

- Born: September 8, 1975 (age 51); Chicago, Illinois, U.S.
- Occupation: Actor
- Years active: 1985–present
- Spouse: Tomasina Parrott (m. 2006)
- Children: 4

Larenz Tate (born September 8, 1975) is an American film and television actor. He is best known for his roles as O-Dog in Menace II Society (1993), Anthony Curtis in Dead Presidents (1995), Frankie Lymon in Why Do Fools Fall In Love, and as Councilman Rashad Tate in Power (2017–20) and Power Book II: Ghost (2020–24).

Tate's other films and television series include the films The Inkwell (1994), Love Jones (1997), A Man Apart (2003), Crash (2004), Ray (2004), Waist Deep (2006) and the television series Rush (2014) and Game of Silence (2016).

== Early life ==
Tate, who is of African American heritage, was born in Chicago, to Peggy and Larry Tate. He is the youngest of three siblings; his two brothers, Larron and Lahmard, are also actors. The family moved to California during the early 1980s. Convinced by their parents to enter a drama program at the Inner City Cultural Center, the trio did not take the lessons seriously until classmate Malcolm-Jamal Warner's ascent to fame after being cast on the sitcom The Cosby Show. Subsequently, realizing that they could parlay their efforts into a tangible form of success, the siblings began to receive small roles and in 1985, Tate made his small-screen debut in an episode of The Twilight Zone. Tate attended Palmdale High School, graduating in 1993.

== Career ==
Following appearances in such television series as 21 Jump Street and The Wonder Years, Tate was cast in the television movie The Women of Brewster Place before receiving the recurring role of Steve Urkel's nemesis, Willie Fuffner, in the sitcom Family Matters. He also appeared as Curtis, a grandson of Redd Foxx's character on the CBS series The Royal Family. Foxx died of a heart attack a month after The Royal Family debuted, and a reworking with Jackée Harry as part of the cast failed to save the series.

After numerous acting roles on television, collaborative filmmaking siblings Albert and Allen Hughes approached him to star in their debut feature Menace II Society in 1993. In the film, Tate portrayed "O-Dog", a trigger-happy teenager. Frederick I. Douglass of the Baltimore Black-American opined Tate's performance in the film made it an instant classic. Tate had a regular role on the short-lived television series South Central (1994) as Andre.

Tate acted in The Inkwell (1994) as Drew. One reviewer praised his performance and called Tate a "promising" actor. However, in negative reviews Tate was seen as "overacting" and compared unfavorably to Jim Carrey. In 1995, Tate portrayed Vietnam veteran Anthony Curtis in the Hughes brothers' Dead Presidents. A film reviewer stated Tate proved he could play sympathetic characters with his performance in the film.

He took on the role of love-stricken young poet Darius in Love Jones (1997). Critic Jay Carr found Tate "engaging" in the role. Tate also played Kenny in The Fresh Prince of Bel-Air in the episode "That's No Lady, That's My Cousin", which was produced by Quincy Jones who Tate would later portray in the 2004 film Ray.

In 1997, Tate appeared as Ford Lincoln Mercury in The Postman. He played Frankie Lymon in the biopic Why Do Fools Fall in Love (1998). One critic praised Tate's dancing prowess in the film. He was the lead character, Neville, in 2000's Love Come Down.

Throughout the 2000s, Tate continued his film career. Tate portrayed Vin Diesel's drug officer partner in A Man Apart (2003), with his other film work including Biker Boyz (2003), Crash (2004), and Waist Deep (2006). Tate was featured in R&B singer Ashanti's 2003 released music video Rain on Me, where he played the jealous, abusive spouse of Ashanti. The video touched on the subject of domestic abuse. In the video game 187 Ride or Die, Tate voices the main character, Buck.

Tate portrayed Shooter Cooper in Love Monkey, which was cancelled after three episodes. He starred in seasons 4-7 of FX's Rescue Me as Bart "Black Shawn" Johnston. Tate appeared as Malcolm, the brother of Don Cheadle's character, in House of Lies and guest starred on an episode of The Mindy Project. Tate starred as beta tester Max in Beta Test (2016) and appeared in the 2017 film Girls Trip. Starting in 2017, Tate played Councilman Rashad Tate on Power, and continued portraying the character in sequel series Power Book II: Ghost.

In 2026, he portrayed Motown executive Berry Gordy in the Michael Jackson biopic Michael.

Tate is a national spokesman for sickle cell disease.

== Filmography ==
=== Film ===
Year	Title	Role	Notes
1993	Menace II Society	Kevin "O-Dog" Anderson	
1994	The Inkwell	Drew Tate	
1995	Dead Presidents	Anthony Curtis	
1997	Love Jones	Darius Lovehall	
1997	The Postman	Ford Lincoln Mercury	
1998	Why Do Fools Fall in Love	Frankie Lymon	
2000	Love Come Down	Neville Carter	
2003	Biker Boyz	"Wood"	
2003	A Man Apart	DEA Agent Demetrius Hicks	
2004	Crash	Peter Waters	
2004	Ray	Quincy Jones	
2006	Waist Deep	"Lucky"	
2011	Sacks West	Larenz	Short
2016	Beta Test	Max Troy	
2017	Girls Trip	Julian Stevens	
2017	Deuces	"Deuces"	
2019	Business Ethics	Zachery Cranston	
2026	Michael	Berry Gordy	

=== Television ===
Year	Title	Role	Notes
1985	The Twilight Zone	Older Brother	Episode: "Night of the Meek"
1987	Hunter	Sporty's Nephew	Episode: "Crossfire"
1987	Frank's Place	Other Boy	Episode: "Cool and the Gang: Part 1 & 2"
1988	Sonny Spoon	Tim	Episode: "Cheap & Chili"
1988	Amen	LeShawn	Episode: "Get Em Up, Scout"
1989	21 Jump Street	Young Adam Fuller	Episode: "Wolly Bullies"
1989	The Wonder Years	Basketball Team Captain	Episode: "Loosiers"
1989	The Women of Brewster Place	Sammy	TV mini series
1989	Matlock	Street Kid #3	Episode: "The Scrooge"
1990	New Attitude	"Chilly D"	Main cast
1990	You Take the Kids	Tyrone	Episode: "The Eggs & I"
1990–1991	Family Matters	Willie Fuffner	Recurring cast: season 2
1991	Clippers	T.J.	TV movie
1991	Seeds of Tragedy	Cornelius	TV movie
1991	The Royal Family	Curtis Royal	Main cast
1992	The Fresh Prince of Bel-Air	Kenny	Episode: "That's No Lady, That's My Cousin"
1993	Harts of the West	Marcus	Episode: "Cowboyz in the Hood"
1994	South Central	Andre Mosely	Main cast
2006	Waterfront	Marcus	Main cast
2006	Love Monkey	Derrick "Shooter" Cooper	Main cast
2007–2011	Rescue Me	Bart "Black Sean" Johnston	Recurring cast: seasons 4-5, main cast: seasons 6-7
2008	Blue Blood	Tre	TV movie
2011	Justified	Clinton Moss	Episode: "For Blood or Money"
2011	Gun Hill	Trane Stevens / Bird Stevens	TV movie
2013	The Mindy Project	Tracy	Episode: "Mindy Lahiri Is a Racist"
2013–2015	House of Lies	Malcolm Kaan	Recurring cast: seasons 2-4
2014	Rush	Alex Burke	Main cast
2015	White Water	Terrance	TV movie
2016	Game of Silence	Shawn Cook	Main cast
2017	Salamander	Ethan	TV movie
2017–2020	Power	Councilman Rashad Tate	Recurring cast: season 4, main cast: seasons 5-6
2020–2024	Power Book II: Ghost	Councilman Rashad Tate	Recurring cast: season 1, main cast: seasons 2-3, guest: season 4

=== Video games ===
Year	Title	Role	Notes
2005	187 Ride or Die	Buck	Voice role

== Awards and nominations ==
Year	Award	Category	Nominated work	Result
1992	Young Artist Awards	Best Young Actor Starring in a New Television Series	The Royal Family	Nominated
1993	Young Artist Awards	Best Young Actor Guest Starring in a Television Series	The Fresh Prince of Bel-Air	Nominated
1998	NAACP Image Awards	Outstanding Actor in a Motion Picture	Love Jones	Nominated
2005	Screen Actors Guild Awards	Outstanding Performance by a Cast in a Motion Picture	Ray	Nominated
2005	Gotham Awards	Best Ensemble Performance (shared with the cast)	Crash	Nominated
2005	Hollywood Film Awards	Ensemble of the Year (shared with the cast)	Crash	Won
2006	Critics' Choice Movie Awards	Best Acting Ensemble (shared with the cast)	Crash	Won
2006	NAACP Image Awards	Outstanding Supporting Actor in a Motion Picture	Crash	Nominated
2006	Screen Actors Guild Awards	Outstanding Performance by a Cast in a Motion Picture	Crash	Won
2010	NAACP Image Awards	Outstanding Supporting Actor in a Comedy Series	Rescue Me	Nominated
2015	NAACP Image Awards	Outstanding Actor in a Television Movie, Mini-Series or Dramatic Special	Gun Hill	Nominated
2015	Black Reel TV Awards	Outstanding Actor, TV Movie or Limited Series	Gun Hill	Won
2020	Black Reel TV Awards	Outstanding Supporting Actor, Drama Series	Power	Nominated
2021	Black Reel TV Awards	Outstanding Guest Actor, Drama Series	Power Book II: Ghost	Nominated
