= Katerina Mikailenko =

American actress, model, and dancer

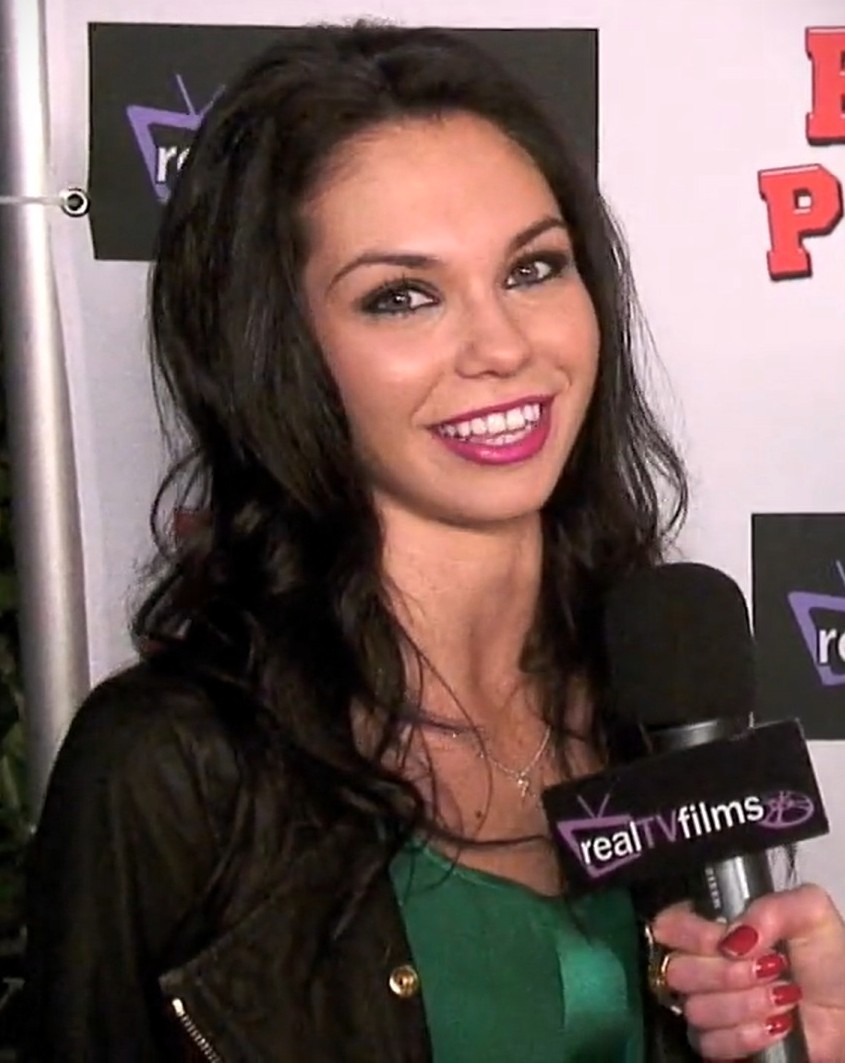
Mikailenko in 2009

Katerina Mikailenko is an American actress, model, and dancer best known for her numerous guest appearances on various network television shows and for her memorable role as Wilhelmina "Billie" Lewis in the 2013 psychological thriller The Employer starring Malcolm McDowell. She grew up in a small town near Portland, Oregon and has also lived in San Diego and Los Angeles.

== Career ==
As a child and teenager, Katerina appeared in modeling campaigns for Adidas, Nike and several department stores. She also fervently studied ballet and modern dance in a semi-professional dance troupe. Despite her natural stage presence, Katerina didn't discover her talent and love for acting until she was cast as Cecily in her high school's production of The Importance of Being Earnest. At the age of 16, Katerina and her family relocated to sunny San Diego, CA. The change in location let her give professional acting a real shot, and with her good looks, talent and a pinch of luck, she was quickly cast in numerous commercials. She followed these successes by booking guest appearances on award-winning shows such as CSI: Miami, Without a Trace, NCIS: Los Angeles and Parks and Recreation. Today, she continues to work in both television and movies.

== Partial filmography ==
- Frat Party (2009) as Michela
- Burlesque (2010) as Brittany
- Crazy, Stupid, Love. (2011) as Stephanie
- The Shower (2012) as Kim
- The Employer (2013) as Billie
