= Univers'l =

- Directed by: Anna Nicholas
- Written by: Anna Nicholas
- Produced by: Reinhard Schreiner
- Starring: Tony Todd
- Cinematography: Dermott Downs
- Edited by: Dawn Hoggatt
- Music by: Gregory Ives
- Production company: Alpha Cine
- Release date: September 15, 1997 (Mill Valley Film Festival)
- Running time: 94 minutes
- Country: United States
- Languages: English; Spanish; Persian; Hebrew; Swedish; Viatnamese; Korean

Univers'l is a 1997 American docudrama film written and directed by Anna Nicholas and featuring Tony Todd.

== Cast ==
- Robert Villalobos as Rodrigo
- Tony Todd as Marcus
- Berengere Gallian
- Mimi Savage as Yolanda
- Jackie Huynh
- Lee Mary Weilnau
- Marshall Manesh
- Ali Pourtash
- Mehr Mansuri
- Monireh Lanzaro
- Avner Garbi as Yehuda
- Aviv Tenenbaum
- Brad Fisher as Bob
- Dian Tran
- Denise Blasor as Maria
- Lana Huynh
- Agnete Strand as Swedish Equestrian
- Anna Karin
- Ann Osmond as Annette
- Anna Nicholas

== Release ==
The film was released at the Mill Valley Film Festival on September 15, 1997.

== Reception ==
Lisa Alspector of the Chicago Reader gave the film a negative review and wrote, "But for the most part the repetitive narrative succeeds only in creating a low-grade suspense that’s purposeless, patronizing, and even obnoxious."
