= Marshall Manesh =

Iranian-American actor (born 1950)

- مارشال منش
- Born: August 16, 1950; Mashhad, Imperial State of Iran
- Occupation: Actor
- Years active: 1970–2019

Marshall Manesh (born August 16, 1950) is a retired Iranian-American actor.

== Biography ==
Manesh's debut film was True Lies, directed by James Cameron. He has appeared in more than 100 feature films, in television projects, and in more than 40 commercials.

Manesh has appeared in recurring roles on the television shows Will & Grace, Scrubs, Andy Barker, P.I., Hot in Cleveland, Boston Legal, and, most notably, How I Met Your Mother, where he played taxi driver Ranjit. Though Ranjit was depicted as Bangladeshi in the series, Manesh delivered several lines in his native Persian.

He has also guest starred on many shows, including Burn Notice, Law & Order: Special Victims Unit, Joey, Persons Unknown, The X-Files, Scrubs, ER, JAG, NYPD Blue, Cooper Barrett's Guide to Surviving Life and Prison Break.

Manesh has acted in several movies, including True Lies, Stealing Harvard, The Big Lebowski, Kazaam, The Poseidon Adventure, Seeking a Friend for the End of the World, Pirates of the Caribbean: At World's End (with fellow Iranian-descended actor and friend Omid Djalili), Jimmy Vestvood: Amerikan Hero, and the Vampire western A Girl Walks Home Alone at Night.

He made a cameo appearance as the cab driver on Madonna's 2005 video for "Hung Up".

He served as a judge at the 6th annual Noor Iranian Film Festival.

== Selected filmography ==
- Checkpoint (1987) .... Abe
- Guests of Hotel Astoria (1989) .... Dr. Parto
- True Lies (1994) .... Jamal Khaled
- Barb Wire (1996) .... Sheik
- Kazaam (1996) .... Malik
- Univers'l (1997)
- The Big Lebowski (1998) .... Doctor
- Word of Mouth (1999) .... Hertzog
- Wasted in Babylon (1999) .... Land Lord
- The Last Producer (2000) .... Cabbie
- Face the Music (2000) .... Indian Man
- Guardian (2001) .... Iraqi Colonel
- Showtime (2002) .... Convenience Store Owner
- Hip, Edgy, Sexy, Cool (2002)
- Stealing Harvard (2002) .... Toy Store Manager
- Hidalgo (2004) .... Camel Skinner
- Raise Your Voice (2004) .... Cabbie
- Surviving Christmas (2004) .... Janitor (uncredited)
- The L.A. Riot Spectacular (2005) .... Nephi
- Looking for Comedy in the Muslim World (2005) .... Shaif Al-Rafi
- "How I Met Your Mother" (2005-2014) .... Ranjit
- Car Babes (2006) .... Babu Gulab
- Pirates of the Caribbean: At World's End (2007) .... Sri Sumbhajee
- Carts (2007) .... Fab
- The Onion Movie (2008) .... Announcer (uncredited)
- Pants on Fire (2008) .... Aram
- Crossing Over (2009) .... Sanjar Baraheri
- Year One (2009) .... Slave Trader
- The Things We Carry (2009) .... Manager
- Tom Cool (2009) .... Mr. Azu
- Pickin' & Grinnin' (2012) .... Clerk
- Commander and Chief (2012) .... Sheikh
- Seeking a Friend for the End of the World (2012) .... Indian Man
- Afternoon Delight (2013) .... Taxi Driver
- All American Christmas Carol (2013) .... Car Salesman
- A Girl Walks Home Alone at Night (2014) .... Hossein 'The Junkie'
- Shirin in Love (2014) .... Nader
- Benjamin Troubles (2015) .... Genie
- Jimmy Vestvood: Amerikan Hero (2016) .... Mehdi the Butcher
- A Life Lived (2016) .... Danesh
- The Next Big Thing (2016) .... Mr. Shah
- Tiger (2018) .... Kulwant (final film role)
