= Devilreaux =

- Official release poster
- Directed by: Thomas J. Churchill
- Written by: Thomas J. Churchill
- Story by: Vincent M. Ward
- Starring: Vincent M. Ward; Tony Todd
- Distributed by: Lionsgate
- Release date: June 30, 2023
- Running time: 94 minutes
- Country: United States
- Language: English

Devilreaux is a 2023 American horror thriller film written and directed by Thomas J. Churchill and starring Vincent M. Ward and Tony Todd.

== Cast ==
- Vincent M. Ward as Devilreaux
- Tony Todd as Leonard
- Krista Grotte Saxon as Lt. Bobbie Briggs
- Jon Briddell as Peter Turner
- Meghan Carrasquillo as Rachel Worth
- Jackie Quinones as Sergeant Lara Baker

== Release ==
The film was released in theaters and on digital and on demand on June 30, 2023. It was previously scheduled to be released on June 9, 2023. It was released on DVD on July 18, 2023.

== Reception ==
James Verniere of the Boston Herald graded the film a C grade, describing it as a "so-so 'Candyman' knockoff".

Jeffrey Anderson of Common Sense Media awarded the film one star out of five.
