= Vanish (film) =

- Film poster
- Directed by: Bryan Bockbrader
- Written by: Bryan Bockbrader
- Produced by: Bryan Bockbrader
- Starring: Maiara Walsh; Tony Todd; Danny Trejo
- Cinematography: Colby Oliver
- Edited by: Ruben Sebban
- Music by: Michael Tuller
- Production company: Grizly Films
- Distributed by: Dark Sky Films
- Release date: February 24, 2015
- Running time: 79 minutes
- Country: United States
- Language: English

Vanish (stylized as VANish) is a 2015 thriller film written and directed by Bryan Bockbrader. It stars Maiara Walsh, Austin Abke, Bockbrader, and Adam Guthrie. Tony Todd and Danny Trejo appear in cameos. Walsh plays a kidnapping victim who both manipulates her captors and becomes a pawn in their individual plots. The entire film takes place from inside the van used to kidnap her character. Dark Sky Films released it to video on demand and on DVD on February 24, 2015.

== Plot ==
While driving a van through Los Angeles, half-brothers Jack and Max argue about Jack's ex-girlfriend, Jasmine, who has called him to demand he retrieve his possessions from her place. Max says Jasmine never loved Jack and has always been obsessed with her dead boyfriend, who died in a carjacking. After arriving at a posh mansion, they don masks, pull out pistols, and kidnap Emma, who fights back. As they subdue her, Max shoots a neighbor who comes over to investigate, angering Jack, who does not want to resort to violence.

Emma, who Max knocked unconscious, wakes while a third conspirator, Shane, is unmasked. When Shane uses Max's real name, the others exasperatedly remove their masks, reasoning that their cover has been blown. They force Emma to record a ransom demand for her wealthy father. She reveals she has not spoken to her father in several years and calls her kidnappers incompetent amateurs. Afterward, she warns the men that her father will likely not pay the ransom, but when he calls them back, Jack threatens to kill Emma unless he does.

Shane, Jack's war buddy from Iraq, drives them to a motel, where they stash Emma. While they are in their rooms, Mexican cartel hitmen search the van and recognize the name of the owner as a possible hit they performed, though they are not sure. Jack surprises them, kills one, and questions the other. Jack learns they tracked the kidnappers through Emma's cell phone and that Carlos, Emma's father and a major cartel boss, has no intention of paying the ransom. After executing the remaining hitman, he quickly gathers the others, and they flee the motel.

Jack explains he never intended to collect the ransom but instead suspects that Carlos killed both Emma's mother and his father, who were having an affair. As evidence, he shows a ring to Emma, who verifies that it belongs to her father. Shane, a drug addict desperate for money, protests against what he believes to be a suicide mission, but Max agrees to follow through with the new plan. Before they can reach the agreed-upon checkpoint, a cop stops them. Max, suspicious that the cop is on to them, murders him, causing Shane to believe that Max is an unreliable psychopath. Max also confesses to being the carjacker who killed Jasmine's previous boyfriend, as he wanted to give Jack a better chance at a relationship with Jasmine.

When they next stop, Shane, unnerved by Max's confession, secretly proposes an alliance with Emma. Emma draws Jack and Max out of the van when she says she must urinate, and Shane searches the vehicle for a weapon. Max returns just as Shane breaks a shotgun out of its lockbox. Max taunts Shane and says that it takes a psychopath to recognize one; Shane agrees and pulls the trigger. Max taunts him further when it becomes obvious Shane did not load the weapon. Enraged, Shane stabs Max to death, then explains to Jack that Max attacked him. Shane uses the empty shotgun to disarm Jack, and he drives off with Emma, who agrees that Jack's revenge plot is doomed.

After driving a short distance, Shane reveals that he has PTSD and used heroin to calm his nerves, as he was prone to fits of violence against women. As Emma becomes increasingly nervous, he grows more aggressive, eventually revealing that he is a serial rapist. As he prepares to assault her, she fights back and wounds him with a power tool left in the van. After Shane stabs her in retaliation, Jack reappears after Emma kills Shane. Emma drives to the checkpoint, where she meets with her father and explains that she has killed all the kidnappers herself. When she demands an explanation from her father, he finally admits to killing Jack's father and Emma's mother. Together, Emma and Jack, who were hiding, kill Carlos, and then defeat his cartel henchmen, though Jack dies of his wounds. Bloodied and injured, Emma pushes Jack's body from the van and drives off.

== Cast ==
- Maiara Walsh as Emma
- Austin Abke as Jack
- Bryan Bockbrader as Max (credited as Bryan Bock)
- Adam Guthrie as Shane
- Tony Todd as Officer Darrow
- Danny Trejo as Carlos
- Joe Davis as Ed
- Esperanza Diaz as Isabella
- Denise Dorado as Jasmine

== Production ==
Bockbrader moved to Los Angeles to pursue acting and began a career in commercials. After his father died suddenly, he chose to follow his dreams and make a film. At first, the film was just going to be about him and his friends in the California desert; this changed when Trejo joined the cast. Bockbrader said Trejo's casting inspired him to work harder to finance the film, and a prior decision to shoot via found footage was abandoned in favor of using more expensive cameras. Walsh was cast after Bockbrader saw her on Amazon Studios' adaptation of Zombieland. Bockbrader said Walsh was eager to shed her Disney image and wanted to play a tough woman. Todd was drawn to the film because he got to play a highway patrolman for the first time but also because the filmmakers and their script impressed him. For his cameo, Todd focused on giving his role a strong characterization to avoid it seeming like a throwaway cameo. Todd called the van an additional character in the film, as it is always present.

Shooting took 13 days. Bockbrader said the fast schedule was stressful and precluded having any fun on the set. Guthrie described the film's main theme as girl power, as Walsh's character is the strongest character in the film. Guthrie said that the van used for the shooting was so large that when it broke down, the first tow truck they called was unable to tow it. Bockbrader said he wanted the viewers to feel as if they were a passenger in the van.

== Release ==
Dark Sky Films released Vanish on February 24, 2015. Todd said that he believed in the film enough to allow the filmmakers to use his name to market the film despite only having a cameo.

== Reception ==
Amy Longsdorf of the Courier-Post called the film "a gear above most B-movies". Eoin Friel of The Action Elite rated it 2.5/5 stars and wrote, "It starts off quite strongly and is rather intense but after about 15–20 minutes it gets less interesting and has a lot of talking." HorrorNews.Net described it as "an unusually solid crime thriller with horror elements thrown in".
