= Henrietta Valor =

American actress (1935-2007)

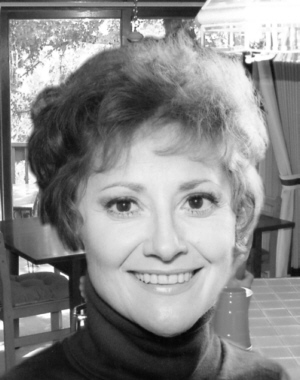
- Photo (circa 1985)
- Born: Henrietta Embick; April 28, 1935; New Cumberland, Pennsylvania, U.S.
- Died: November 23, 2007 (aged 72); Studio City, California, U.S.
- Spouse(s): Alfon Valor (1959–1970); John Towey (1982–2007)

Henrietta Valor (née Embick; April 28, 1935 – November 23, 2007) was an American actress and singer who starred on Broadway in Jacques Brel is Alive and Well and Living in Paris, Half a Sixpence, Applause, and Annie.

== Life ==
Henrietta Embick was born in New Cumberland, Pennsylvania on April 28, 1935. She earned her bachelor's degree in music and acting at Northwestern University in 1957. Additionally, she studied opera at the Music Academy of the West, which is located in Montecito, California, with Lotte Lehmann in the late 1950s. She moved to Los Angeles in 1990.

Valor died of complications from Alzheimer's disease on November 23, 2007.

== Off-Broadway/touring ==
Off-Broadway, she starred in Fashion, which she reprised twenty years later at the Pasadena Playhouse. She toured extensively for the USO in Europe, Africa, and the Far East including Vietnam. Her regional theatre credits include: The Studio Arena Stage (Buffalo, New York), The Alliance Theatre (Atlanta), A.C.T. (Seattle), the Williamstown Theatre (Massachusetts), PAF Playhouse (Huntington, Long Island), Playwrights Horizons (New York City), the Boston Shakespeare Company, and three seasons with the acting company of The Guthrie Theatre (Minneapolis). She studied opera on scholarship with Lotte Lehmann in Santa Barbara and acting with Alvina Krause at Northwestern University where she received her Bachelor of Music degree.

Valor was a runner-up in the Metropolitan Opera Auditions in New York City. Her last acting role was Miss Framer in Lettice and Lovage at the Pasadena Playhouse.

== Broadway ==
Valor starred on Broadway in Jacques Brel is Alive and Well and Living in Paris, Half a Sixpence, Applause, and Annie.
