= Tony Todd =

American actor (1954–2024)

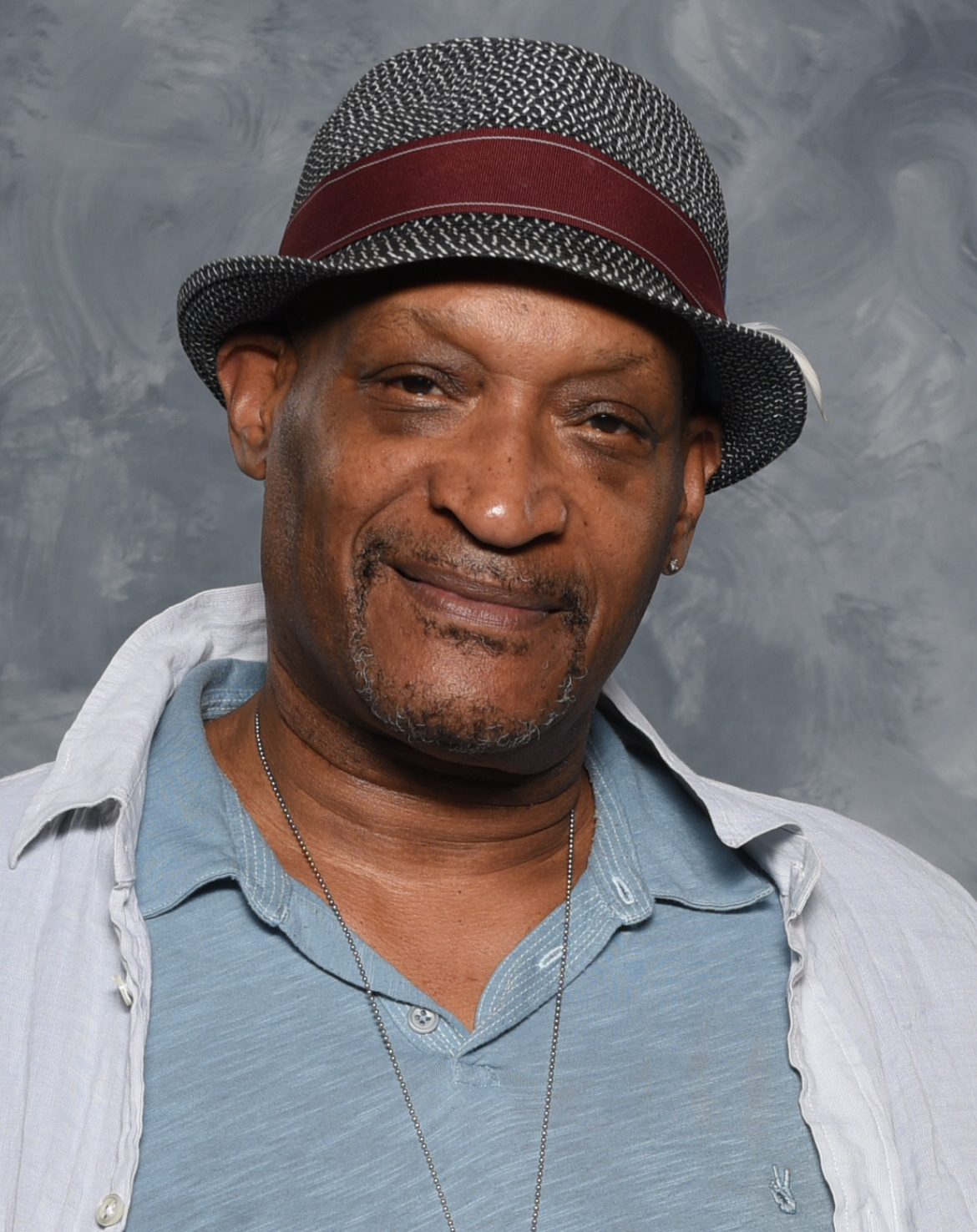
- Todd in 2017
- Born: Anthony Tiran Todd; December 4, 1954; Washington, D.C., U.S.
- Died: November 6, 2024 (aged 69); Marina del Rey, California, U.S.
- Occupation: Actor
- Years active: 1986–2024
- Children: 2
- Relatives: Donald W. Todd (brother; deceased) Monique Dupree (half-sister)

Anthony Tiran Todd (December 4, 1954 – November 6, 2024) was an American actor. Known for his distinctly deep and gravelly voice, he amassed numerous credits on screen and in video games since the 1980s, including the title character in the Candyman film series (1992–2021) and William Bludworth in the Final Destination franchise (2000–2025). For the former, he was nominated at the Critics' Choice and Fangoria Chainsaw Awards.

Todd's films include Platoon (1986), Night of the Living Dead (1990), The Crow (1994), The Rock (1996), Wishmaster (1997), Hatchet, Minotaur (both 2006), The Man from Earth (2007), Frankenstein (2015), Death House (2017), and Hell Fest (2018). On television, he played Kurn in Star Trek: The Next Generation (1990–1991) and Star Trek: Deep Space Nine (1996), Lord Haikon on Stargate SG-1 (2005–2006), and appeared in the MTV series Scream (2019) and Devil May Cry (2025).

Todd was a prolific voice actor, notably voicing the Vortigaunts in the Half-Life series of games, the Fallen in Michael Bay's Transformers: Revenge of the Fallen (2009), Zoom in The Flash (2014–2023), Darkseid in the DC Animated Movie Universe (2015–2020), Venom in the video game Marvel's Spider-Man 2 (2023), and Locus in the video game Indiana Jones and the Great Circle (2024). For Spider-Man 2, he received a British Academy Games Award nomination.

== Early life and education ==
Todd was born on December 4, 1954, in Washington, D.C., the son of Evetta Lyons Gaither. He grew up in Hartford, Connecticut, attending local schools including Hartford Public High School. He was also an alumnus of the Artists Collective, Inc. Todd attended the University of Connecticut and then went on to study theater at the Tony Award-winning Eugene O'Neill National Actors Theatre Institute, and the Trinity Repertory Company in Providence, Rhode Island. Tony has one living brother and a sister.

== Career ==
=== Film ===
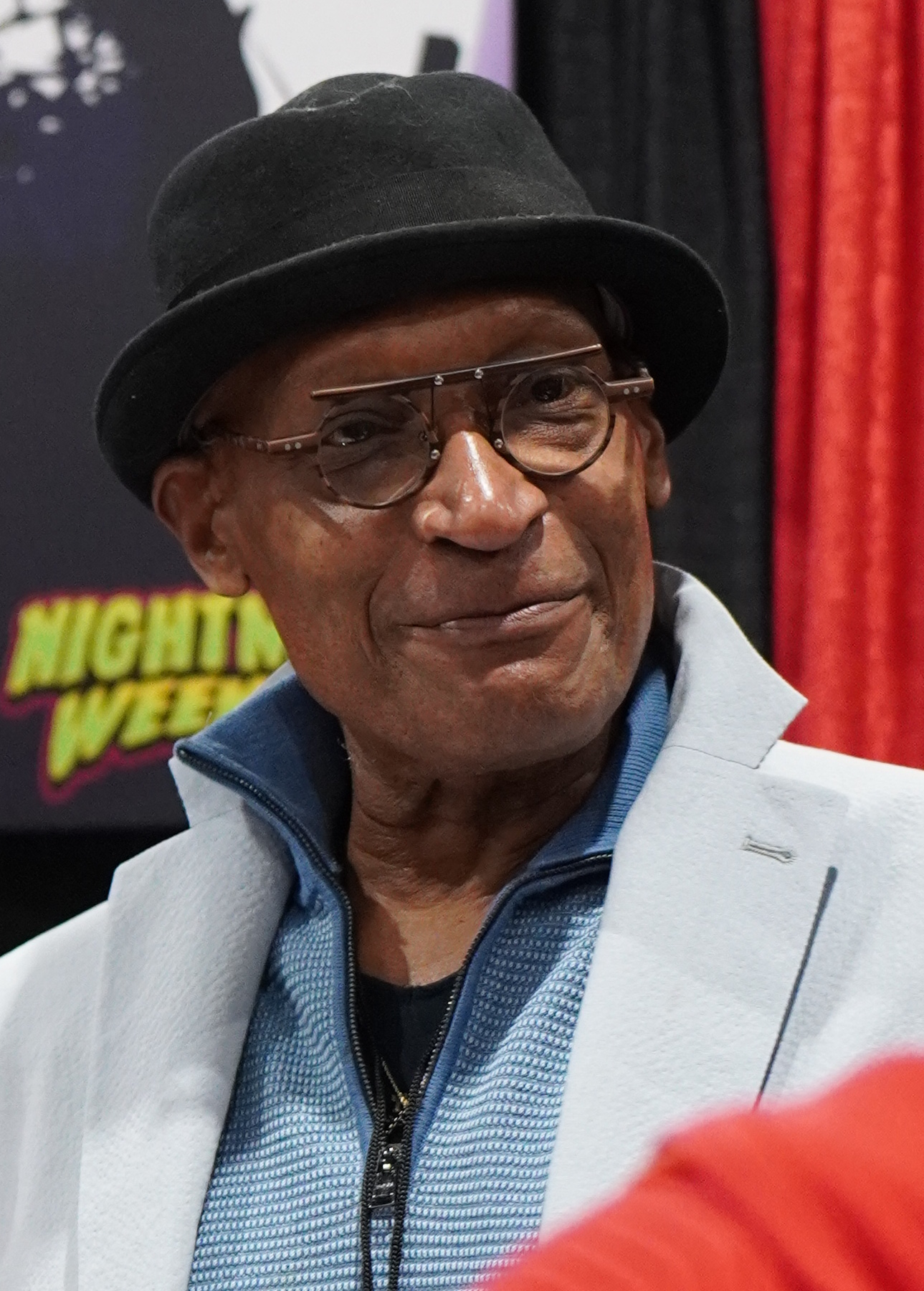
Todd in October 2023

Todd appeared in more than 100 theatrical and television films and played opposite many major Hollywood stars. His film credits include: Platoon (1986), Night of the Living Dead (1990), Candyman (1992), The Crow (1994), The Rock (1996), Wishmaster (1997), the Final Destination series (2000–2025), Minotaur (2006), and Beg (2010). Todd was the voice of The Fallen in Transformers: Revenge of the Fallen (2009) and was also in the Rel Dowdell film Changing the Game. Todd was a special guest of the Weekend of Horror Creation Entertainment on May 23, 2010, and Screamfest LA. Todd portrayed Reverend Zombie in Hatchet II, which was released in a limited number of theatres on October 1, 2010. His signature baritone voice narrated several works, including the 2021 documentary Invisible Threads: From Wireless to War. Todd returned as William Bludworth, when he filmed Final Destination Bloodlines in 2024.

=== Broadway ===
Todd acted on and off Broadway. Among his many roles are August Wilson's King Hedley II, Athol Fugard's The Captain's Tiger, for which he received the Helen Hayes nomination. Others include No Place to be Somebody, Les Blancs, Playboys of the West Indies, Othello, Zooman and The Sign, award-winning playwright Keith Glover's Dark Paradise, Aida (on Broadway), and Levee James for the Eugene O'Neill Playwrights Conference and The New Dramatist Guild.

=== Television ===
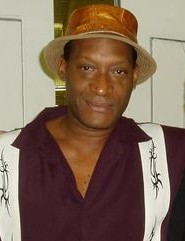
Todd in 2003

Todd's other television appearances include a recurring role on Boston Public and guest appearances on Law & Order, Homicide: Life on the Street, Hercules: The Legendary Journeys, Xena: Warrior Princess as Cecrops, The X-Files, Smallville, Psych, Angel, 24, Charmed, Stargate SG-1, Andromeda, Criminal Minds, 21 Jump Street, and Chuck.

Todd is one of the few actors to have portrayed two different speaking roles on 24. He was initially cast as Detective Michael Norris in season three and four years later as General Benjamin Juma in both 24: Redemption and season 7. He also played a major role in the Babylon 5 TV film A Call to Arms.

He portrayed several characters in the Star Trek universe: Worf's brother Kurn in Star Trek: The Next Generation and Star Trek: Deep Space Nine, an adult Jake Sisko in the episode "The Visitor" in Star Trek: Deep Space Nine, and an Alpha Hirogen in the episode "Prey" in Star Trek: Voyager. In 2017, Todd returned to the world of Star Trek as General Rodek in the MMORPG game Star Trek Online.

Todd also provided the voices of the Decepticon Dreadwing on Transformers: Prime, and Icon in Young Justice.

In 2015, Todd was cast as the disguised voice of Zoom (portrayed by Teddy Sears when undisguised) in the second season of The Flash. Todd would later reprise his role in the fifth season episodes "What's Past Is Prologue" and "Godspeed" (though the latter featured archive audio of Todd instead) and returned to the role one last time for the series finale, "A New World, Part Four".

On October 12, 2018, it was confirmed by Bloody Disgusting that Todd would star in a recurring role in Scream: Resurrection, the third season of the slasher television series Scream. The season premiered on VH1 on July 8, 2019.

=== Audio ===
Todd played the title character in Bleak December Inc.'s 2016 audio drama adaptation of Bram Stoker's Dracula.

Todd was the narrator of the spoken word version of Ice Nine Kills' album The Silver Scream, released on June 29, 2023.

== Health and death ==
When Todd signed on to film Final Destination Bloodlines in 2023, he privately let the producers know that he had terminal stomach cancer. During filming in early 2024, they elected to allow Todd to improvise the last lines of his character Mr. Bludworth so he could give a proper goodbye to audiences: "Life is precious, enjoy every single second. You never know when ... Good luck".

Todd died at his home in Marina del Rey, California, on November 6, 2024, at the age of 69. His cause of death was listed as stomach cancer. Both Final Destination Bloodlines and Indiana Jones and the Great Circle were dedicated to his memory.

Insomniac Games intended to make a spin-off video game starring Venom after Todd played the character in Marvel's Spider-Man 2. However, the game was reportedly cancelled or placed on the backburner after his death. Both his co-stars Nadji Jeter (whom Todd affectionally called "nephew") and Yuri Lowenthal attended his funeral.

== Filmography ==
=== Film ===
Year	Title	Role	Notes
1986	Sleepwalk	Barrington Rutley III	
1986	Platoon	Sergeant Warren	
1987	84 Charing Cross Road	Demolition Worker	
1987	Bang! You're Dead!	Undercover Agent	
1987	Enemy Territory	The Count	
1988	Colors	Vietnam Vet	
1988	Bird	"Frog"	
1989	Lean on Me	Mr. William Wright	
1990	Ivory Hunters	Jomo	Television film
1990	Criminal Justice	Detective Riley	Television film
1990	Night of the Living Dead	Ben	
1990	The Bride in Black	747 Green	Television film
1990	Voodoo Dawn	Makoute	
1991	Love and Curses... And All That Jazz	Emile Gaston	Television film
1991	Keeper of the City	Bridger	Television film
1992	Sunset Heat	Drucker	
1992	Candyman	Daniel Robitaille / The Candyman	
1993	Excessive Force	Detective Frankie Hawkins	
1994	The Crow	"Grange"	
1995	Candyman: Farewell to the Flesh	Daniel Robitaille / The Candyman	
1995	Burnzy's Last Call	Mistress Marla	
1996	Sabotage	Sherwood	
1996	Beastmaster III: The Eye of Braxus	Seth	Television film
1996	The Rock	Captain Darrow	
1996	Driven	Darius Pelton	
1996	Them	Berlin	Television film
1997	True Women	Ed Tom	Television film
1997	Stir	Bubba	
1997	Wishmaster	Johnny Valentine	
1997	Univers'l	Marcus	
1998	Shadow Builder	Covey	
1998	Caught Up	Jake Samples	
1998	Butter	Benzo Al	
1998	The Pandora Project	CIA Director Garrett Houtman	
1999	Babylon 5: A Call to Arms	Leonard Anderson	Television film
1999	The Dogwalker	Mones	
1999	Candyman 3: Day of the Dead	Daniel Robitaille / The Candyman	Direct-to-video
2000	Final Destination	William Bludworth	
2000	The Secret	Bill	
2002	Silence	Eric Crowell	
2003	Control Factor	Reggie	Television film
2003	Final Destination 2	William Bludworth	
2003	Scarecrow Slayer	Caleb Kilgore	Direct-to-video
2004	Murder-Set-Pieces	Clerk	
2005	Checking Out	Manuel	
2005	The Prophecy: Forsaken	Stark	Direct-to-video
2005	I.O.U.	Jack Bruckner	Short
2005	Dark Assassin	"Ghost"	
2005	Heart of the Beholder	Chuck Berry	
2005	Turntable	Victor	
2006	Final Destination 3	Animatronic Devil	Voice
2006	Minotaur	King Deucalion	
2006	Shadow: Dead Riot	Shadow	
2006	Hatchet	Reverend Zombie	
2006	The Absence of Light	The Alchemist	
2006	The Eden Formula	James Radcliffe	Television film
2006	The Strange Case of Dr. Jekyll and Mr. Hyde	Dr. Henry Jekyll / Edward Hyde	
2007	Chicago Massacre: Richard Speck	Captain Joe Dunning	Direct-to-video
2007	Shadow Puppets	Steve Garrett	
2007	Tournament of Dreams	Isaiah Kennedy	
2007	The Man from Earth	Dan	
2007	The Mannsfield 12	Hunnit Grand	
2007	The Eyes of Samir	Steve McReedy	Short
2008	iMurders	Agent Washington	
2008	Dark Reel	Detective Shields	
2008	Bryan Loves You	The Narrator	
2008	Nite Tales: The Movie	Clown	
2008	The Thirst: Blood War	Julien	
2008	Dockweiler	The Duke	Short
2008	24: Redemption	General Benjamin Juma	Television film
2009	Are You Scared 2	Controller	Direct-to-video
2009	Vampire in Vegas	Sylvian	
2009	Penance	Chauffeur	
2009	Transformers: Revenge of the Fallen	The Fallen	Voice
2009	The Graves	Reverend Abraham Stockton	
2009	Tom Cool	Mac Angel	
2009	Dead in Love	–	
2010	The Quiet Ones	TV Show Host / Narrator	
2010	Hatchet II	Reverend Zombie	
2010	Three Chris's	God	
2011	Final Destination 5	William Bludworth	
2011	Beg	Nathan McVay	
2011	Dream in American	Lubembe	
2011	Jack the Reaper	Steel	
2011	The Family	Mason	
2012	Falling Away	Christopher	
2012	Changing the Game	Curtis the Diabolical / FBI Agent	
2012	Sushi Girl	Duke	
2012	A Night at the Silent Movie Theater	Jones	
2013	Dead of the Nite	Ruber	
2013	Dust of War	Crispus Hansen	
2013	Kill Her, Not Me	Detective Holmes	
2013	Army of the Damned	Jackson	
2014	Prelude to Axanar	Admiral Marcus Ramirez	Short
2014	Disciples	Duncan	
2014	The Sun Devil and the Princess	The Baron	Voice, short
2015	Lego DC Comics Super Heroes: Justice League vs. Bizarro League	Darkseid	Voice, direct-to-video
2015	Bleeding Hearts	God	
2015	Vanish	Officer Darrow	
2015	Frankenstein	Eddie	
2015	Driven	Mr. Reynauld	Short
2015	Lego DC Comics Super Heroes: Justice League – Attack of the Legion of Doom	Darkseid	Voice, direct-to-video
2015	Night of the Living Dead: Darkest Dawn	Ben	Voice
2015	Agoraphobia	Dr. Murphy	
2015	Live Evil	Pastor	
2015	Scream at the Devil	Detective Johnson	
2016	Beyond the Game	Manny	
2016	Cowboy's Girl	Cowboy	Short
2016	Broken Cross	Father Dudley	
2016	Zombies	Detective Sommers	
2017	Victor Crowley	Reverend Zombie	
2017	Death House	Farmer Asa	
2017	From Jennifer	Chad Wolfe	
2017	Two Faced	Dr. Hanson	
2018	IMTK	Tom	Short
2018	The Debt Collector	Barbosa	
2018	West of Hell	Jericho Whitfield	
2018	Worth	Hunter	
2018	Hell Fest	Carnival Barker	
2018	The Final Wish	Colin	
2018	Drive Me to Vegas and Mars	Frank	
2018	Requiem	Reverend Bill Abernathy	
2019	Reign of the Supermen	Darkseid	Voice, direct-to-video
2019	Heads Will Roll	Medical Examiner	Short
2019	Candy Corn	Bishop Gate	
2019	Badland	Senator Benjamin Burke	
2019	Immortal	Ted	
2019	Fate Upside Down	Father Dudley	Short
2020	Bulletproof 2	Special Agent Battle	
2020	Bad Manners	The Holy Bible	Short
2020	Justice League Dark: Apokolips War	Darkseid	Voice, direct-to-video
2020	Sky Sharks	Major General Frost	
2020	Tales from the Hood 3	William	Direct-to-video
2020	Stoker Hills	Professor Smith	
2021	Insight	Carl	
2021	The Lockdown Hauntings	Jordan Myers	
2021	The House Next Door: Meet the Blacks 2	Rival	
2021	Destination Marfa	Mayor Henry	
2021	Candyman	Daniel Robitaille / The Candyman	
2021	The Changed	Bill	
2021	The Reenactment	Wilbur	
2021	Horror Noire	Pike	
2021	Night Night	James Glass	
2021	All Gone Wrong	Lamont Hughes	
2021	Traveling Light	Caddy	
2022	Hellblazers	Harry	
2022	Bitch Ass	Titus Blaq	
2022	Catfish Christmas	Bob	
2023	Realm of Shadows	Fr. Dudley	
2023	H.P. Lovecraft's Celephaïs	–	Short
2023	Devilreaux	Leonard	
2023	Dixieland	Charles Colster	Short
2023	The Nana Project	Jack	
2023	The Activated Man	Jeffrey Bowman	
2024	The Bunker	Major Frank Lawrence	
2024	Stream	Future Mr. Lockwood	
2025	Werewolf Game	The Judge	Posthumous release
2025	Cutter's Club	Dr. George Roberts	Shot in 2005, completed in 2025
2025	Final Destination Bloodlines	William Bludworth	Posthumous release
2025	The Pitchfork Retreat	Host	Posthumous release
2026	The Raven	Father Reginald / The Messager	Posthumous release

=== Television ===
Year	Title	Role	Notes
1987	Simon & Simon	Troy Tolliver	Episode: "I Thought the War Was Over"
1987	Werewolf	Charlie	Episode: "The Unicorn"
1987	21 Jump Street	Aaron Jackson	Episode: "You Oughta Be in Prison"
1989	Kate & Allie	–	Episode: "A Tree Grows on West 56th Street"
1989	Night Court	Mr. Crumine	Episode: "For Love or Money"
1989	MacGyver	Zimba	Episode: "Black Rhino"
1990	Matlock	Billy Pierce	Episode: "The Narc"
1990	Cop Rock	Omar	Episode: "Potts Don't Fail Me Now"
1990–1991	Jake and the Fatman	Jordan Lee	Recurring cast: Season 4
1990–1991	Star Trek: The Next Generation	Kurn	Guest cast: Season 3–5
1991	Father Dowling Mysteries	Lou	Episode: "The Fugitive Priest Mystery"
1994	Law & Order	Reverend Ott	Episode: "Sanctuary"
1994	The X-Files	Augustus D. Cole	Episode: "Sleepless"
1994	Homicide: Life on the Street	Matt Rhodes	Recurring cast: Season 3
1995	Hercules: The Legendary Journeys	Gladius	Episode: "The Gladiator"
1995	Black Fox	Britt Johnson / Black Fox	Main cast
1995–1996	Star Trek: Deep Space Nine	Adult Jake Sisko / Kurn	2 episodes
1996	Murder, She Wrote	National Security Agent Nathan Mitchell	Episode: "Mrs. Parker's Revenge"
1996	New York Undercover	Andrew Bryant	Episode: "Rule of Engagement"
1996	Beverly Hills, 90210	Dr. Julius Tate	Episode: "If I Had a Hammer"
1997	NYPD Blue	Detective Eddie Hazell	Episode: "Taillight's Last Gleaming"
1997	Xena: Warrior Princess	Cecrops	Episode: "Lost Mariner"
1997	Soldier of Fortune, Inc.	Joseph Karenga	Episode: "Missing in Action"
1998	Star Trek: Voyager	Alpha Hirogen	Episode: "Prey"
1998	Hercules: The Legendary Journeys	Gilgamesh	Episode: "Faith"
1999	Where Are They Now?	Himself	Episode: "Horror Movie Stars"
1999	Cousin Skeeter	Big Rick	Episode: "Bowled Over"
2000	Angel	Vyasa	Episode: "The Shroud of Rahmon"
2001	UC: Undercover	Cephus	Episode: "The Siege"
2001	Smallville	Earl Jenkins	Episode: "Jitters"
2002	Crossing Jordan	Coach Jim Evans	Episode: "Lost and Found"
2002	Andromeda	Captain Fehdman Metis	Episode: "The Lone and Level Sands"
2002	Charmed	Avatar of Force	Episode: "Sam I Am"
2002	Boston Public	Lester Lipschultz	2 episodes
2002	CSI: Miami	Sergeant Marcus Cawdrey	Episode: "Camp Fear"
2002–2003	The District	Stanley Carver	2 episodes
2004	The 100 Scariest Movie Moments	Himself	Episode: "Part I: 100–81"
2004	24	Detective Michael Norris	Episode: "Day 3: 3:00 a.m.–4:00 a.m."
2005	HypaSpace	Himself	Episode: "Episode #4.175"
2005	Night Stalker	Detective	Episode: "Malum"
2005	Criminal Minds	Eric Miller	Episode: "The Fox"
2005–2006	Stargate SG-1	Lord Haikon	Recurring cast: Season 9
2006	Svengoolie	Himself	Episode: "Dracula's Daughter"
2006	Masters of Horror	The Beast	Episode: "Valerie on the Stairs"
2007	Boston Legal	Detective Walter Berenson	Episode: "The Innocent Man"
2007	Without a Trace	Dr. Carl Williams	Episode: "Res Ipsa"
2007–2011	Chuck	CIA Director Langston Graham	Recurring cast: Season 1-2, Guest: Season 5
2009	Batman: The Brave and the Bold	Astaroth	Voice, episode: "Trials of the Demon!"
2009	24	General Benjamin Juma	Recurring cast: Season 7
2009	Psych	Detective Moses Johnson	Episode: "High Top Fade Out"
2009	Splatter	Spencer Pope	Main cast
2010	Sym-Bionic Titan	Dark Shaman	Voice, episode: "Shaman of Fear"
2010	The Event	General Whitman	Recurring cast
2012	Hawaii Five-0	Jordan Nevins	Episode: "Kalele (Faith)"
2012	Holliston	Himself	Episode: "Candyman"
2012	Transformers: Prime	Dreadwing	Voice, recurring role
2012	Zombie Family	Principle McGuffy	Episode: "Are You Eyeballing Me Boy?"
2012–2013	Young Justice	Icon	Voice, 2 episodes
2013	Halloween Wars	Himself / Guest Judge	Episode: "Twisted Nursery Rhymes"
2013	The Young and the Restless	Gus Rogan	Regular cast
2014	Bravest Warriors	Aeon Worm	Voice, episode: "Season of the Mitch"
2015–2023	The Flash	Zoom	Voice (recurring role: season 2, guest: seasons 5 and 9); 16 episodes
2016	Dead of Summer	Holyoke the Tall Man	Recurring cast
2017	Be Cool, Scooby-Doo!	Space Kook, Captain Lewis, Reggi	Voice, 2 episodes
2017	Room 104	The Father	Episode: "The Knockadoo"
2017	Riverdale	"Farmer" McGinty	Episode: "Chapter Twenty: Tales from the Darkside"
2019	The Orville	Moclan Delegate	Episode: "Sanctuary"
2019	Scream: Resurrection	Luther Thompson / Hook Man	3 episodes
2021, 2024	Masters of the Universe: Revelation	Scare Glow	Voice
2021–2022	Dota: Dragon's Blood	Slyrak	Voice, main cast
2026	Devil May Cry	Beowulf, Fury 2	Voice, episode: "The Fallen"; posthumous release

=== Video games ===
Year	Title	Role	Notes
1998	Star Trek: The Next Generation: Klingon Honor Guard	Kurn	
2000	The Legend of Dragoon	Cutscene narrator	Uncredited
2003	Star Trek: Elite Force II	Korban	
2007	Half-Life 2: Episode Two	Vortigaunts	
2011	Dota 2	Dragon Knight, Night Stalker, Viper	
2012	Call of Duty: Black Ops II	Admiral Tommy Briggs	Voice and motion capture
2017	Star Trek Online	General Rodek, Kurn	
2018	Artifact	Viper	
2019	Layers of Fear 2	Narrator	
2020	Half-Life: Alyx	Vortigaunts	
2021	Back 4 Blood	Doctor Rogers	
2023	Stern Pinball	Venom	
2023	Spider-Man 2	Venom	
2024	Indiana Jones and the Great Circle	Locus	Posthumous release

== Awards and nominations ==
Year	Award	Category	Nominated work	Result	Ref.
1993	Fangoria Chainsaw Awards	Best Actor	Candyman	Nominated	
2022	Critics' Choice Awards	Best Villain in a Movie	Candyman	Nominated	
2024	British Academy Games Awards	Performer in a Supporting Role	Spider-Man 2	Nominated	
