= Beta Test (film) =

- Theatrical release poster
- Directed by: Nicholas Gyeney
- Written by: Nicholas Gyeney; Andre Kirkman
- Produced by: Nicholas Gyeney; Andre Kirkman
- Starring: Larenz Tate; Manu Bennett; Linden Ashby; Kevon Stover; Yuji Okumoto
- Cinematography: Michael Boydstun
- Edited by: Jay Somsen
- Music by: Julien-K
- Production company: Mirror Images LTD
- Release date: July 22, 2016
- Running time: 88 minutes
- Country: United States
- Language: English
- Budget: < $2 million
- Box office: $10,104

Beta Test is a 2016 American science fiction action-thriller film written, produced, and directed by Nicholas Gyeney. Gyeney described the film as a cross between Die Hard, Gamer, and The Firm. The film stars Larenz Tate, Manu Bennett, Linden Ashby, and Yuji Okumoto. The film was released on July 22, 2016.

== Plot ==
Opening scene a man was enjoying himself with his girlfriend, when all of a sudden some gang of men came and took them away

== Cast ==
- Manu Bennett as Orson Creed
- Larenz Tate as Max Troy
- Linden Ashby as Andrew Kincaid
- Kevon Stover as Zane
- Yuji Okumoto as The Surgeon
- Brandy Kopp as Tech Support
- Sara Coates as Abbie Creed, Orson's Wife
- Edward Michael Scott as The Professional
- Edi Zanidache as The Runt
- Bill Sorice as Interviewer
- Stefan Hajek as "Slackjaw"
- Adrien Gamache as Caleb Angelo
- Mark Riccardi as The 2nd Professional
- Angela DiMarco as Lillian Brandt
- Angela Okumoto as Reporter

== Production ==
=== Development ===
Gyeney started developing Beta Test in the summer of 2014.

Gyeney provided information on the film stating "this film has 127 scenes and with [my] Type-A personality, I have a very specific vision."

=== Casting ===
Gyeney stated, "I'm not Steven Spielberg", while indicating that there would be no auditions or screen tests for the film. Scripts were sent out to actors whom Gyeney was familiar with, and those of whom liked the script with interest of being in the film were cast.

Larenz Tate was cast as the protagonist, Max. Manu Bennett as the hero video game character, Orson Creed. And, Linden Ashby as Kincaid, the primary villain of the film.

=== Filming ===
Principal photography was conducted in Seattle, Washington. It took place over 19 days starting November 7. 2014 and finishing on November 26, 2014.

Seattle was chosen as the place to shoot the film because it is Gyeney's hometown and he believed "shooting such a movie in the Northwest will diversify the local film community, which is mostly dominated by indie dramas. It could lead to an entire wave of action-oriented material being shot here, which would bring tons of work to local stunt teams and stuff that is totally nonexistent right now."

Gyeney stated, "the longest long-take fight sequence currently on record is three-and-a-half minutes, and it's held by the Korean movie 'Oldboy.' Our goal is to destroy that record."

=== Animation ===
Video game footage was needed to be developed for the film after principal photography was completed. It began in December 2014 starting with the character, Creed.

== Release ==
The film was released on July 22, 2016. In their review for The Hollywood Reporter, Frank Scheck praised the film for being "impressively choreographed and filmed", though criticized the film for choosing technology over realism, as well as exploiting real life tragedies such as 9/11. He also criticized the "outdated visual style" of the graphics, which would be noticed by hardcore gamers, whom this film is targeted towards.
