= Dennis L. A. White =

American actor

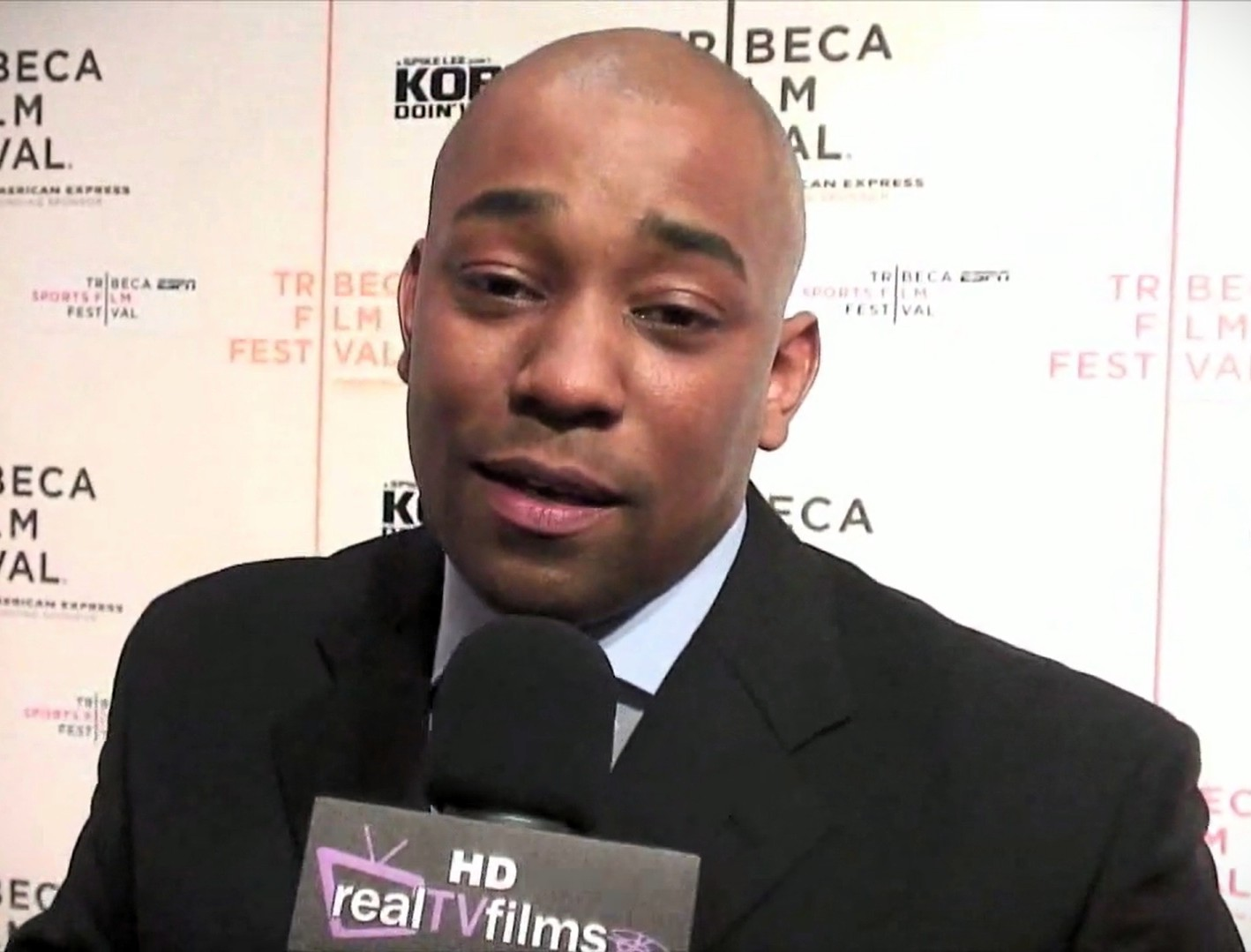
- White in 2009
- Other name: Dennis Da Menace
- Occupation: Actor
- Years active: 2000–present

Dennis L. A. White is an American actor noted for portraying Damion "D-Roc" Butler in the Notorious B.I.G. biopic entitled Notorious.

== Early life ==
White was born and raised in Southern California in 1978, to a Grammy nominated mother and a military father. He was exposed to many different cultures and ideas. When his family relocated to Fayetteville, North Carolina White developed his love for music and acting. He was offered a baseball scholarship while a student at Westover High School to play baseball; however, he decided to take an academic scholarship at Winston-Salem State University in Winston-Salem, North Carolina.

== Career ==
Under the guise of "Dennis Da Menace", Dennis put out his Billboard charted album, The Wonderful World of Dennis in 2001. In 2003, Dennis became the first African-American host at Fuse Television. He began to host several TV shows: Weekend Vibe, HBO's 5 Rounds and Chatzone, and MTV's Hip Hop Life.

White then pursued his love for acting with appearances in The Brave One with Jodie Foster, Law & Order: SVU, The Jury, I Think I Love My Wife, etc. In 2010, he portrayed a cancer stricken comedian in Marq Overton's Off Broadway play, Die Laughing. White also played Virgil on The N mini-series, Miracle's Boys. Dennis had a recurring role on TNT (TV channel)'s The Closer. In 2009, Dennis created "Act Like You Know", a company that gives acting workshops and seminars to aspiring actors across the country. In 2009, Dennis became the re-occurring character "Mistah Ray" on NBC's Parenthood.

In 2013, Dennis started a foundation called "M.O.R.P.H." to help eradicate racial profiling.

== Filmography ==
=== Film ===
Year	Title	Role	Notes
2000	Swimming	Jeeper	
2007	I Think I Love My Wife	Party Thug	
2007	The Brave One	Thug on Subway	
2009	Notorious	Damion "D-Roc" Butler	
2010	April's Fools	Tamil	
2010	Code Blue	-	
2010	Three Chris's	Chris Walker	
2011	King of Paper Chasin'	J.B.	
2011	After Hours: The Movie	Rugged & Menace Hit Man	
2012	Dysfunctional Friends	Minister	
2012	Small Apartments	Marcus	
2012	Changing the Game	Adult Dre	
2013	Dreams	Jermaine	
2014	Envy or Greed	Bobby Connell	Short
2014	The Other Side	Detective Michaels	
2014	Lap Dance	Pauly	
2014	Sky Eye	Carson	Short
2015	Bleeding Hearts	Chris Walker	
2015	Diamond Ruff	Rev. Trek Woods	
2015	Sweet Lorraine	Lincoln Kennedy	
2016	Bad Dad Rehab	Slick Rick	TV movie
2017	Secrets	Jay Jenkins	
2017	The White Sistas	Bingo	
2017	Thank You for Your Service	Dante's Friend	
2019	All In	Dupree	
2020	Turnt	Detective Kruthers	
2020	The Prayer	Thomas Sr.	
2020	The Witness Protection Program	Dontae	
2020	Power Corrupts	LT. Gov Jeff Davis	
2021	Entanglement	Hendrix	
2021	Crossover	Chris	
2021	Dear Best Friend	Mark	
2021	Letters from the Bottle	Dean Callaway	
2021	Careful What You Ask For!	Jay Rogers	Short
2021	The Pros of Cons	Ray Turk	
2022	Super Turnt	Detective Kruthers	
2022	No Better Love	Mr. Thompson	
2022	A Father's Pride	Deacon Walters	
2022	Scam City	King	
2023	Mickey Hardaway	Joseph Sweeney	
2023	Street Connected	Detective Peters	
2023	Cuzo	-	
2023	The Pass	Deon	
2023	Halfway House	OG	

=== Television ===
Year	Title	Role	Notes
2004	IMX	Himself/Host	Main Host
2004	The Jury	Derrick Smith-Bey	Episode: "Bangers"
2005	Jonny Zero	Pillsbury	Episode: "I Did It All for the Nooky"
2005	Miracle's Boys	Virgil	Recurring Cast
2010	Let's Talk About Pep	Himself	Episode: "Episode #1.3"
2010-11	The Closer	Reggie Moses	Guest Cast: Season 1-2
2011-13	Parenthood	Mista Ray	Guest: Season 3, Recurring Cast: Season 5
2012	NYC 22	Teef	Episode: "Samaritans"
2014	Almost Home	Hassan	Episode: "You Gone Learn Today..."
2014	Black Dynamite	Arnold's Stomach (voice)	Episode: "Diff'rent Folks, Same Strokes or The Hunger Pain Games"
2016-18	Atlanta	Bald Man/D.J.	Guest Cast: Season 1-2
2018-20	The Family Business	Kennedy	Recurring Cast: Season 1, Guest: Season 2
2020	5th Ward The Series	OG Russell	Recurring Cast: Season 2

2024

Kold X Windy Fontain Series Regular Season 2

=== Video Games ===
Year	Title	Role
2004	Def Jam Fight for NY	Baxter (voice)
2005	The Warriors	Sid/Glenn/Keenan/Jonah (voices)
