= 187 Ride or Die =

2005 video game

- North American PlayStation 2 cover art
- Developers: Ubisoft Paris; Virtuos (PSP)
- Publisher: Ubisoft
- Producer: Ali Kojori
- Platforms: PlayStation 2, Xbox, PlayStation Portable
- Release: NA: August 23, 2005; AU: August 25, 2005; EU: August 26, 2005; PSP: EU: March 31, 2006
- Genres: Racing, vehicular combat
- Modes: Single-player, multiplayer

187 Ride or Die is a 2005 urban street racing vehicular combat video game developed and published by Ubisoft. It was released for the PlayStation 2 and Xbox in late August 2005 in North America and Europe. A port for the PlayStation Portable developed by Virtuos was released only in Europe in March 2006 under the title Street Riders.

== Gameplay ==
187 Ride or Die is set in Los Angeles' infamous South Central region, where players must race and defeat opponents through a variety of stages to become the "top dog". The game also features a co-op mechanic, in which one player can be the driver and the second player rides along as the shooter, whether playing through the story or online. There are a variety of modes available to the player, such as system link and online multiplayer. Multiplayer on Xbox Live was available to players until 15 April 2010. The game is now playable online again on the replacement Xbox Live servers called Insignia.

== Reception ==
Reception

Aggregate score
Aggregator	Score	
Aggregator	PS2	Xbox
Metacritic	52/100	51/100

Review scores
Publication	Score	
Publication	PS2	Xbox
Eurogamer	4/10	N/A
GameRevolution	D+	D+
GameSpot	6.2/10	6.2/10
GameSpy	3/5	3/5
GameTrailers	7/10	7/10
GameZone	6/10	5.9/10
IGN	5/10	5/10
Jeuxvideo.com	15/20	6.5/10
VideoGamer.com	5/10	5/10
Detroit Free Press	N/A	2/4
El Español	6.1/10	6.1/10
Meristation	7/10	7/10
The Sydney Morning Herald	2.5/5	2.5/5

187 Ride or Die received mixed reviews on both platforms according to the review aggregation website Metacritic. Though some praise was given to the game's graphics and voice acting, reviewers criticised its gameplay, writing and presentation, particularly its stereotyped depiction of gangsta rap and hip-hop culture as well as its gratuitous use of street slang.

Jeff Gerstmann of GameSpot gave the game a 6.2/10, noting the game's repetitive gameplay and forced use of its "gangsta" theme, stating "187 Ride or Die is a fairly standard car combat game with extremely repetitive gameplay and a hip-hop theme that feels about as fake and forced as it possibly could." Martin Coxall of Eurogamer also gave the game a similarly negative review, comparing it unfavourably with Grand Theft Auto: San Andreas in terms of presentation: "It feels like a parody of Gangsta-speak, or perhaps more accurately, a script written by some preppy WASP kid using an English-to-Gangsta translator page they found on the web one morning. There's only so much 'Yo shizzle, Gangsta!' a person can take."
