= Changing the Game (film) =

2012 film directed by Rel Dowdell

- Directed by: Rel Dowdell
- Written by: Rel Dowdell; Aaron R. Astillero
- Produced by: Thomas L. Webster; Alain Silver; Karen L. Isaac
- Starring: Sean Riggs; Irma P. Hall; Dennis L.A. White; Brandon Ruckdashel; Mari White; Suzzanne Douglas; Sticky Fingaz; Tony Todd
- Cinematography: Bob Demers
- Edited by: Nicholas Schwartz
- Music by: Charles Gregory Washington
- Distributed by: Barnholtz Entertainment / Lionsgate
- Release date: May 11, 2012
- Running time: 103 Minutes
- Country: United States
- Language: English

Changing the Game is a 2012 dramatic film starring Sean Riggs, Tony Todd, Raw Leiba, Sticky Fingaz, Brandon Ruckdashel and Irma P. Hall and directed by Rel Dowdell. The film opened theatrically by AMC Theatres in New York, Philadelphia, Chicago, DC, Atlanta and was cited by the noted website FilmFresh.com as one of the top three African-American films of 2012. The film recently premiered on May 15, 2014 on cable channel BET as the "Movie of the Week."

== Plot ==
Darrel (Riggs) is a supremely intelligent African-American man who rises from the tough streets of Philadelphia to the world of high finance on Wall Street. He soon learns the white-collar world is filled with as much crime as the drug-filled hood he left behind.

== Cast ==
- Sean Riggs as Darrell Barnes
- Tony Todd as Curtis the Diabolical / FBI Agent
- Irma P. Hall as Grandma Barnes, Darrell's grandmother
- Sticky Fingaz as Craig
- Brandon Ruckdashel as Marty Levine
- Munir R. Kreidie as Obul Metha
- Dennis L.A. White as Andre "Dre" Newell
- Mari White as Jennifer
- Suzzanne Douglas as Mrs. Davis, Darrell's teacher
- Raw Leiba as Balu
- Elizabeth Marie Camacho as Julissa, Sexy Flight Attendant
- Charli Baltimore as News Reporter

== See also ==
- List of black films of the 2010s
