= To Jennifer =

2013 American film by James Cullen Bressack

- Directed by: James Cullen Bressack
- Written by: James Cullen Bressack; Chuck Pappas
- Starring: Chuck Pappas; Jessica Cameron; James Cullen Bressack; Jody Barton
- Cinematography: James Cullen Bressack; Chuck Pappas
- Edited by: James Cullen Bressack
- Production company: Psykik Junky Pictures
- Release date: October 15, 2013
- Running time: 74 minutes
- Country: United States
- Language: English

To Jennifer is a 2013 American found footage horror film directed and edited by James Cullen Bressack, who co-wrote it with Chuck Pappas. Starring Pappas, Bressack, and Jessica Cameron, the film follows a young man who sets out to confront his unfaithful girlfriend. It was released direct to DVD on October 15, 2013. The film was shot entirely on an iPhone 5.

To Jennifer was followed by three sequels: 2 Jennifer (2016), From Jennifer (2017), and For Jennifer (2018).

== Synopsis ==
The film follows Joey as he travels to meet Jennifer, his long-distance girlfriend of two years. He believes that she is cheating on him and decides to film his trip down to her home in an attempt to elicit guilt from Jennifer over her presumed adultery. Joey persuades his cousin Steven and their friend Martin to join him on the trip, which turns into a car trip after Joey has a mental breakdown on a plane and puts them on the No Fly List. As the trio travels closer to their destination, Steven begins to grow leery of Joey's increasingly fragile mental state. This is further compounded by Joey's mother also showing concern over Joey during their Skype sessions, especially as he had never mentioned Jennifer to her before. Martin then goes missing, making Steven even more concerned.

Joey manages to convince Steven to keep driving and they eventually reach Jennifer's home. They find that she is at home, but has another guy with her. Joey confronts her, telling Steven to remain in the car. Wanting to see the film to its completion, Steven leaves the car and discovers Martin's corpse in the trunk. He enters the home to find Joey covered in blood. Joey murders Steven and then going after Jennifer. It's revealed that Joey was never in a relationship with Jennifer and was instead stalking her to fulfill his obsession with her.

== Cast ==
- Chuck Pappas as Joey
- Jessica Cameron as Jennifer
- James Cullen Bressack as Steven
- Jody Barton as Martin

== Reception ==
Critical reception has been mixed. Much of the criticism was due to the length of To Jennifer, as many of the critics felt that the film would have had more impact as a shorter film. Praise for the film commonly centered upon Bressack filming To Jennifer entirely on an iPhone, and a reviewer for Bloody Disgusting remarked that this gave the movie an "authentic video diary feel". DVD Verdict gave a mixed review, stating that "To Jennifer doesn't break any new ground as a horror story, but it works pretty well on its extremely small scale."

== See also ==
- List of films shot on mobile phones
