= Suzzanne Douglas =

American actress (1957–2021)

- Born: April 12, 1957; Chicago, Illinois, U.S.
- Died: July 6, 2021 (aged 64); Martha's Vineyard, Massachusetts, U.S.
- Education: Illinois State University (BA); Manhattan School of Music (MM)
- Occupation: Actress
- Years active: 1978–2021
- Known for: Jerri Peterson – The Parent 'Hood; Amy Simms – Tap
- Spouse: Roy J. Cobb (m. 1989)
- Children: 1
- Awards: NAACP Image Award – (1989) Outstanding Supporting Actress in a Motion Picture (Tap)

Suzzanne Douglas (April 12, 1957 – July 6, 2021) was an American actress. She was best known for her role as matriarch Geraldine "Jerri" Peterson on The WB sitcom The Parent 'Hood, starring Robert Townsend, which originally ran from 1995 to 1999. Douglas also portrayed Amy Simms in the 1989 dance/drama film Tap alongside Gregory Hines and Sammy Davis Jr., for which she won an NAACP Image Award for Outstanding Supporting Actress in a Motion Picture.

In addition to Tap, Douglas starred in several other motion pictures, among them How Stella Got Her Groove Back (1998), Jason's Lyric (1994), The Inkwell (1994) as well as the 2003 Disney/ABC version of Sounder with Carl Lumbly. Douglas was also well known for her portrayal as Cissy Houston in the Lifetime TV movie Whitney which aired in 2015. In May 2019, she appeared as the mother of one of the main characters in the Netflix miniseries When They See Us directed by the acclaimed Ava DuVernay and produced by Oprah Winfrey's Harpo Films.

== Early life and education ==
Douglas was born on April 12, 1957, in Chicago, Illinois, to Lois Mae Thompson and Donald Douglas, Sr. One of four children, Douglas was reared by a single mother, and grew up in the Altgeld Gardens Homes public housing complex on the city's far south side. She became interested in the arts as a child, citing 1965's The Sound of Music as her inspiration for acting. Douglas attended Thornton Township High School, graduating in 1974. After high school, she studied at Illinois State University, graduating with a Bachelor of Arts degree. She later earned a Master's degree in music specializing in Jazz Vocals at the prestigious Manhattan School of Music.

== Career ==
Douglas made numerous television guest star appearances on shows such as Bull, Bones and The Good Wife. She also appeared on The Parkers, The Cosby Show, Law & Order: Criminal Intent, NYPD Blue, and Touched by an Angel. On stage, Douglas performed the role of Jenny Diver in The Threepenny Opera starring Sting and Dr. Bearing in Wit, where she was the first African American to perform the role. Douglas was a two-time NAACP Image Award winner; she also won a Reel Award, and the Mary Martin Award. In 2011, Douglas appeared in the Rel Dowdell film Changing the Game.

== Other work ==
Douglas was an honorary member of Delta Sigma Theta sorority where she served on its national executive board as the Honorary Co-chair of the Arts and Letters Commission for thirteen years. In the community, she was a lifetime member of Girl Scouts of the USA, The National Council of Negro Women, Sigma Alpha Lambda (a national leadership and honors organization), and Jack and Jill of America.

== Personal life and death ==
In February 1989, Douglas wed neuro-radiologist Roy Jonathan Cobb, to whom she was still married at the time of her death. Together, the couple had one daughter.

Douglas died on July 6, 2021, at age 64, at her home in Martha's Vineyard after a two-year battle with pancreatic cancer.

== Filmography ==
=== Film ===
Year	Title	Role	Notes
1981	Purlie		Television film
1989	Tap	Amy Simms	
1990	The Knife and Gun Club	Ginny Ducette	Television film
1992	Chain of Desire	Angie	
1992	Condition: Critical	Dr. Bailey Wallace	Television film
1994	I'll Do Anything	Rainbow House Star	
1994	The Inkwell	Brenda Tate	
1994	Search for Grace	Margaret / Melody	Television film
1994	Jason's Lyric	Gloria Alexander	
1998	The Last Weekend	Mrs. Fisher	Short film
1998	How Stella Got Her Groove Back	Angela	
2003	Sounder	The Mother	Television film
2003	School of Rock	Tomika's Mother	
2004	Sunday on the Rocks	Jessica	
2012	Changing the Game	Mrs. Davis	
2015	Whitney	Cissy Houston	Television film
2016	Happy Yummy Chicken	Sarah Del Casserole	
2020	Really Love	Ann Richmond	

=== Television ===
Year	Title	Role	Notes
1989	A Man Called Hawk	Lorna Wells	Episode: "Vendetta"
1990	The Cosby Show	Rebecca Shorter	Episode: "Live and Learn"
1990–1991	Against the Law	Yvette Carruthers	17 episodes
1991	Great Performances	Lady In Plaid / The Girl	Episode: "The Colored Museum"
1991	ABC Afterschool Specials	Sammy	Episode: "In the Shadows of Love: A Teen AIDS Story"
1992	I'll Fly Away	Ruth	3 episodes
1993	American Playhouse	Eunice Perry	Episode: "Hallelujah"
1995–1999	The Parent 'Hood	Geraldine "Jerri" Peterson	90 episodes
1996–1999	Touched by an Angel	Dr. Rebecca Dixon / Brianna	2 episodes
1996	NYPD Blue	Mrs. Torrence	Episode: "Where's 'Swaldo"
1997–1998	Promised Land	Dr. Rebecca Dixon	4 episodes
1999–2000	The Parkers	Constance West-McFarland	2 episodes
2001	Law & Order: Special Victims Unit	Principal	Episode: "Secrets"
2004	Law & Order: Criminal Intent	Karen Watkins	Episode: "Mad Hops"
2010	The Good Wife	Judge Keely Farmer	Episode: "Infamy"
2011	Are We There Yet?	Melissa	Episode: "The Parent Teacher Trap Episode"
2016	Bones	Elizabeth Burkhart	Episode: "The Monster in the Closet"
2016	Bull	Betty Everton	Episode: "Just Tell the Truth"
2019	When They See Us	Grace Cuffe	Miniseries

=== Theatre ===
Year	Title	Role	Notes
1983	The Tap Dance Kid	Little Rio Dancer/New Yorker Ginnie (Understudy)	Broadway
1987-89	Into the Woods	Witch, Cinderella, Sleeping Beauty (Understudy)	Broadway
1989	Threepenny Opera	Jenny Diver	Broadway
