= The Employer =

- Film poster
- Directed by: Frank Merle
- Written by: Frank Merle
- Produced by: Frank Merle; Tiago Mesquita; Ross Otterman
- Starring: Malcolm McDowell; David Dastmalchian; Paige Howard; Billy Zane
- Cinematography: Tiago Mesquita
- Music by: Jonathan M. Hartman
- Production company: Hyrax Entertainment
- Distributed by: Vision Films
- Release date: June 7, 2013
- Running time: 90 minutes
- Country: United States
- Language: English

The Employer is a 2013 American psychological thriller film written and directed by Frank Merle. The film stars Malcolm McDowell as the title character who interviews five candidates for a job at a mysterious, powerful corporation. After a film festival circuit in early 2013, the film was released by Vision Films in the U.S. on June 7, 2013, as an On Demand premiere title, followed by a DVD release on July 2, 2013.

== Plot ==
Five highly qualified applicants for a position with the mysterious, powerful Carcharias Corporation wake up trapped together in a locked room without any hope of escape. After exchanging stories about how each of them had been sedated and abducted they receive a phone call from their interviewer, known only as The Employer, who informs them that they have to kill each other; only the last surviving candidate would get the job.

== Cast ==
- Malcolm McDowell as The Employer
- David Dastmalchian as James
- Paige Howard as Sandra
- Michael DeLorenzo as Keith
- Matthew Willig as Mike
- Katerina Mikailenko as Billie
- Nicki Aycox as Maggie
- Billy Zane as Alan

== Release ==
In October 2012, a near-completed version of film was screened at Shriekfest in Los Angeles, as an Official Opening Night Selection.

In December 2012, the film won the award for Best Thriller at the Illinois International Film Festival. In March 2013, the film won a Special Jury Award at the Geneva Film Festival.

Other festival appearances include the LA Indie Film Festival, and the Big Bear Horro-Fi Film Festival as a Special Invitation screening.

The film was released in the United States by Vision Films, a worldwide distributor of independent films, across all major On Demand platforms on June 7, 2013. A DVD release followed on July 2, 2013.
