= John Hoogenakker =

American actor

- Born: Charlotte, North Carolina, U.S.
- Education: DePaul University (BFA)
- Occupation: Actor
- Years active: 1999–present
- Children: 2

John Hoogenakker (/ˈhoʊɡənækər/) is an American actor. On stage, he has been in a number of plays in the Chicago and Milwaukee area. He played the Bud Light King in Bud Light's Dilly Dilly television commercials. He played Lt. Spellman in the NBC series Chicago Fire, Matice in the Prime Video thriller series Tom Clancy's Jack Ryan, Carl Wilkes in Castle Rock, and Randy Ramseyer in the Hulu limited series Dopesick. In film he has notably appeared in Paul Thomas Anderson's One Battle After Another.

== Early life and education ==
Hoogenakker was born and raised in Charlotte, North Carolina. His first commercial was as a child for Pepsi/NASCAR. He attended South Mecklenburg High School. He was involved in choir, children's theatre, JROTC and the debate team. He got his Bachelor of Fine Arts in acting from The Theatre School at DePaul University in Chicago in 1999.

== Career ==
=== Stage work ===
Hoogenakker's first professional role was in 1999 as Scarus in the Shakespeare play Antony and Cleopatra at the Chicago Shakespeare Theater. In 2000, he played Chris Smith in the Tracy Letts play Killer Joe when it was at The Theatre at 2851 N. Halsted Street; and the title character in the play Robyn Hood of Barnsdale Wood at the Equity Library Theatre. He was in the main cast for the Bomb-itty of Errors when it was performed in Chicago.

In 2002, he was involved in the Missouri Repertory Theatre and Arizona Theatre Company co-production Work Song: Three Views of Frank Lloyd Wright where he played one of Frank's sons. He joined the Milwaukee Repertory Theater, and debuted as Junior in Escape from Happiness. He would later return in 2007 to do Translations. In the summer of 2004, for the Illinois Shakespeare Festival, he played Valentine in Two Gentlemen of Verona and Hamlet in Hamlet. Other Shakespeare appearances were with the Chicago Shakespeare Theater where he portrayed Paris in Romeo and Juliet (2005), Claudio in Much Ado About Nothing (2005–2006) and Rodrigo in Othello (2008).

At Writers Theatre, he had multiple roles in the ensemble plays The Puppetmaster of Lodz (2007) and Travels with My Aunt (2010–2011); as well as single roles Hamlet in Rosencrantz and Guildenstern Are Dead (2009), Dermot in Port Authority (2013), and George in Death of a Streetcar Named Virginia Woolf: A Parody (2016). the last of which was nominated for a Jeff Equity Award for Best Ensemble.

At Goodman Theatre, he had roles in Sarah Ruhl's Passion Play: A Cycle in Three Parts (2007), played Milan in Rock 'n' Roll (2009), Paul Moore in Tracey Scott Wilson's The Good Negro (2010), Trip Wyeth in Other Desert Cities (2013) and the Physic in Jordan Harrison's The Amateurs (2015). In 2012, he played Willie Oban in the Goodman Theatre's revival of The Iceman Cometh, and would reprise his role in 2015 when the show was performed at the Brooklyn Academy of Music in New York City. In 2018, he played Scrooge for a limited engagement on the Q Brothers Christmas Carol, a rendition of A Christmas Carol, produced by the Chicago-based Q Brothers GQ and JQ. He had previously worked with GQ on The Bomb-itty of Errors.

James Goldman’s The Lion in Winter played at Court Theatre, Chicago, Illinois from November 3 to December 3, 2023. John Hoogenakker portrayed King Henry II. Rounding out the cast were Rebecca Spence, Kenneth La’Ron Hamilton, Brandon Miller, Shane Kenyon, Netta Walker, and Anthony Baldasare.

=== Television and film work ===
Hoogenakker's earliest role on national television was a doctor in the series ER. In 2011, he played district attorney Jeff Doyle towards the end of season 2 of Boss. He had a recurring role as Lt. Spellman in season 2 of Chicago Fire. On film, he had roles in Flags of Our Fathers and Public Enemies. He played Gustav in A Very Harold & Kumar Christmas, Mr. Pritchard in At Any Price, and Guy in Animals.

In August 2017, Hoogenakker played the Bud Light King in "Banquet", a medieval-themed beer commercial wherein his lines introduced the popular catchphrase, "Dilly Dilly". He said that he auditioned for the commercial role via video teleconference. The campaign was very popular and resulted in multiple commercials and appearances during Super Bowls and other major sports events over the next few years.

In 2018, Hoogenakker got a recurring role as Scott Garland in season 3 of Colony. He joined the cast of the Amazon TV series Tom Clancy's Jack Ryan as CIA operator Matice, who was a recurring character in season 1 and a main character in season 2. In 2019, he played Carl Wilkes in season 2 of Castle Rock.

In 2021, he joined the main cast of the Hulu mini-series Dopesick, based on the nonfiction book Dopesick: Dealers, Doctors and the Drug Company that Addicted America by Beth Macy. He portrayed Assistant U.S. Attorney Randy Ramseyer, who was a real person. He auditioned via Zoom, and helped director Avy Kaufman do read-throughs as they were auditioning other actors; Kaufman said "was so good in the read-through, it was like, we got to give him a great part in the series." Dopesick has garnered a number of awards and nominations.

He played John in the 2021 short film I Can Change which was written and directed by Jim Jenkins, the same director for the Bud Light ads. In the film, his character is "an underachiever who receives the power to stop time the night before his wedding". Jenkins said, "Having worked with John many times, I always tell him he has a unique ability to play both the smartest person and the dumbest person in the scene at the same time." The film premiered at Tribeca Festival in 2021.

He starred in a TV commercial for the Chevy Silverado that aired during the Summer Olympics in 2021. In the ad, also directed by Jenkins, he plays the owner of a cat (Walter the Cat) who does things people would expect of a dog. Another ad reprising the two aired at the end of January and during the 2022 Winter Olympics.

In 2023, he appeared in the mini-series Waco: The Aftermath, a sequel to Waco which aired in 2018 on Paramount Network. He also appeared in the thriller film Knox Goes Away, which is directed by his Dopesick co-star Michael Keaton.

In 2025, he appeared in Paul Thomas Anderson's One Battle After Another. The film went on to win the Oscar for Best Picture at the 98th Academy Awards in 2026. In an article for Numéro Netherlands, Hoogenakker stated, "I am overjoyed to be able to report to you that Paul Thomas Anderson creates perhaps the most collaborative and creative environment I’ve ever been blessed to be a part of. My first day on location in Sacramento, I was invited to view the dailies with the rest of the cast and crew and was astounded by what I saw. I’m overjoyed for audiences to see this piece."

In February 2026, he appeared in a Super Bowl commercial for the Hyundai Palisade alongside his Jack Ryan co-star, John Krasinski.

== Personal life ==
Hoogenakker is married and has two children.

== Stage credits ==
Year	Production	Role	Venue	Notes	Refs
1999	The Grapes of Wrath	Uncle John	Merle Reskin Theatre		
1999–2000	Antony and Cleopatra	Scarus	Chicago Shakespeare Theater		
2000	Killer Joe	Chris Smith	The Theatre at 2851 N Halsted	play by Tracy Letts	
2000	Robyn Hood of Barnsdale Wood	Robyn Hood	Equity Library Theatre Chicago		
2001	The Bomb-itty of Errors	Various characters	Chicago Shakespeare Theater; Royal George Cabaret Theatre, Chicago		
2002	Work Song: Three Views of Frank Lloyd Wright	John Wright, Draftsman, Grant	Missouri Repertory Theatre and Arizona Theatre Company	touring production	
2002	Escape from Happiness	Junior	Milwaukee Repertory Theater		
2003	Richard III	Catesby	Milwaukee Repertory Theater		
2004	Two Gentlemen of Verona	Valentine	Illinois Shakespeare Festival		
2004	Hamlet	Hamlet	Illinois Shakespeare Festival		
2005	Romeo and Juliet	Paris	Chicago Shakespeare Theater		
2005–2006	Much Ado About Nothing	Claudio	Chicago Shakespeare Theater		
2006	The Retreat from Moscow	Jamie	Northlight Theatre		
2006	100 Saints You Should Know	Matthew	Steppenwolf Theatre Company	by Kate Fodor	
2007	Translations	Lieutenant Yolland	Milwaukee Repertory Theater		
2007	The Puppetmaster of Lodz	Various characters	Writers Theatre	original play by Gilles Segal	
2007	Passion Play: A Cycle in Three Parts	Machinist, German Officer, VA	Goodman Theatre	by Sarah Ruhl	
2008	Othello	Roderigo	Chicago Shakespeare Theater		
2009	Wait Until Dark	Harry Roat, Jr.	Court Theatre		
2009	Rock 'n' Roll	Milan	Goodman Theatre		
2009	Rosencrantz And Guildenstern Are Dead	Hamlet	Writers Theatre		
2010	The Good Negro	Policeman 2, Paul Moore	Goodman Theatre	by Tracey Scott Wilson	
2010–2011	Travels with My Aunt	Henry Pulling, Tooley, et al.	Writers Theatre	starring roles	
2011	Season's Greetings	Clive	Northlight Theatre		
2012, 2015	The Iceman Cometh	Willie Oban	Goodman Theatre (2012); Brooklyn Academy of Music (2015)		
2013	Other Desert Cities	Trip Wyeth	Goodman Theatre		
2013	Port Authority	Dermot	Writers Theatre		
2014	Seven Guitars	Flight Announcer	Court Theatre		
2015	The Amateurs	The Physic	Goodman Theatre	by Jordan Harrison, for their New Stages Festival event	
2016	Death of a Streetcar Named Virginia Woolf: A Parody	George	Writers Theatre / The Gillian Theatre; The Second City	co-directed by Michael W. Halberstam	
2018	Q Brothers Christmas Carol	Scrooge	Chicago Shakespeare Theater	parody of A Christmas Carol by the Q Brothers (GQ and JAQ)	
2023	The Lion in Winter	Henry II	Court Theatre		

== Filmography ==
=== Film ===
List of acting performances in film
Year	Title	Role	Notes	Source
2006	Flags of Our Fathers	Funeral home employee		
2009	Public Enemies	Agent Hugh Clegg		
2011	A Very Harold & Kumar Christmas	Gustav		
2012	At Any Price	Mr. Pritchard		
2014	Animals	Guy		
2015	Consumed	Inspector Davis		
2016	The Talk	Father	short film	
2017	Market Value	Eric Reese		
2021	I Can Change	John	short film	
2023	Knox Goes Away	Detective Rale		
2025	G20	Agent Darden		
2025	One Battle After Another	Tim Smith		
2027	F.A.S.T.		Post-production	

=== Television ===
List of acting performances in television
Year	Title	Role	Notes	Source
2005	ER			
2009	Gifted Hands: The Ben Carson Story	Psychiatrist	Television film	
2011	The Playboy Club	Leo Bianchi	5 episodes	
2012	Boss	Jeff Doyle	Season 2	
2013	Chicago Fire	Lt. Spellman	Recurring season 2	
2016	The Girlfriend Experience	Gordon Sirica	Episode: "Separation"	
2018	Colony	Scott Garland	Recurring season 3	
2018–2019	Jack Ryan	Matice	Recurring season 1; Main, season 2	
2019	Castle Rock	Carl Wilkes	Recurring season 2	
2021	Dopesick	Randy Ramseyer	Starring role	
2023	Waco: The Aftermath	Clive Doyle	Mini-series	
2025	The Twisted Tale of Amanda Knox	Curt Knox	Mini-series	
2025	The Morning Show	Andy Montgomery	Recurring	

=== Video games ===
List of voice performances in video games
Year	Title	Role	Notes	Source
2005	Stubbs the Zombie in Rebel Without a Pulse	Beat Cop, Riot Cop		
2007	Crysis	Major Bradley		
2020	Call of Duty: Black Ops Cold War	Voice Talent		
