= Gamm Theatre =

Theatre in Rhode Island, United States

Coordinates: 41°52′49″N 71°22′49″W

The Gamm Theatre
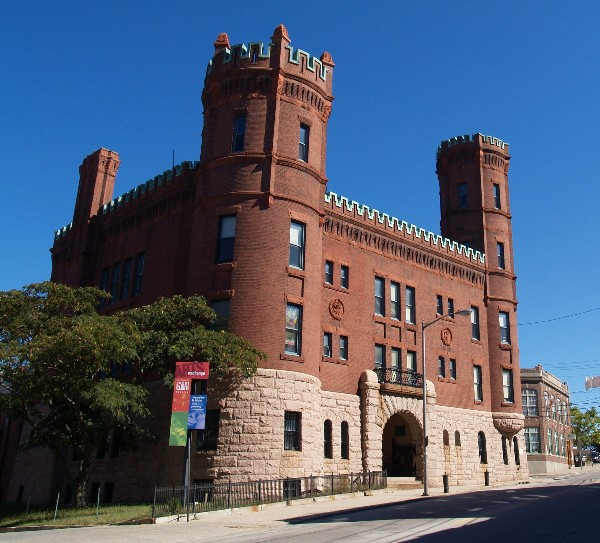
- The Pawtucket Armory, which formerly housed the Gamm Theatre
- Interactive map of The Gamm Theatre
- Address: 1245 Jefferson Boulevard; Warwick, Rhode Island; United States
- Capacity: 175–300
- Type: Regional theatre

Website
- www.gammtheatre.org

The Gamm Theatre (previously the Sandra Feinstein-Gamm Theatre) is a non-profit theater in Warwick, Rhode Island.

== History ==
The theater was founded in October 1984 as Alias Stage by seven members of the graduating class of Trinity Rep Conservatory. They performed at the Riverside Mills in Providence's Olneyville neighborhood, but that space was destroyed by a fire on December 18, 1989. Alias reopened at the Atlantic Mills with a production of "The Dragon" on January 18, 1990, immediately adjacent to the Riverside Mills. The group moved to a semi-permanent garage space in the Providence Jewelry District in 1994, backed by a board of directors.

In 1998, the theater staged its last performance as the Alias Stage with King Lear. They then changed their name to the Sandra Feinstein-Gamm Theatre after receiving a donation of $100,000 from Alan Shawn Feinstein in memory of his sister. The theater remained in the cramped Jewelry District until October 2002, when they were in need of a larger space and financial re-organization. The Gamm announced a hiatus following a production of Cat on a Hot Tin Roof. Shortly after, they hired Tony Estrella as artistic director and Yvonne Seggerman as managing director, and the Gamm reopened in November 2003 with a 135-seat house in an old police garage, part of the Pawtucket Armory Center.

Their 34th season, in 2018–2019, was the first full season after relocating from Pawtucket to their new, permanent home on Jefferson Boulevard in Warwick at the old Ocean State Theatre building. A renovation is underway while they still produce their 35th season in 2019–2020, using elements of the original building fused with newer elements and technology to upgrade the theatre.

== Awards ==
Elliot Norton Awards

- 2008– Outstanding New Script (Paul Grellong, Radio Free Emerson)
- 2009– Outstanding Production by a Small Company (Awake and Sing!)
- 2010– Special Citation for having "firmly established itself as a theatrical jewel in our region" celebrating its 25th season

Pell Award for Excellence in the Arts

- 2013– Artistic Director Tony Estrella

== Seasons ==
2019–20 Season

- Admissions (Joshua Harmon)
- JQA (Aaron Posner)
- A Doll's House, Part 2 (Lucas Hnath)
- Assassins (music and lyrics by Stephen Sondheim. Book by John Weidman)
- Mary Jane (Amy Herzog)
- It's A Wonderful Life: a Live Radio Play (adapted by Joe Landry)

2017–18 Season

- The Importance of Being Earnest (Oscar Wilde) dir. Fred Sullivan Jr.
- Incognito (Nick Payne) dir. Tyler Dobrowsky
- The SantaLand Diaries (Joe Mantello, adapted for the stage from the story by David Sedaris)
- Uncle Vanya (Anton Checkov) Translated and Directed by Curt Columbus
- A Human Being Died That Night (Nicholas Wright, adapted for the stage from the book by Pulma Gobodo-Madikizela) dir. Judith Swift
- As You Like It (William Shakespeare) dir. Tony Estrella and Rachel Walshe

2016–17 Season

- Arcadia (Tom Stoppard) dir. Fred Sullivan Jr.
- American Buffalo (play) (David Mamet) dir. Tyler Dobrowsky
- The Children's Hour (Lillian Hellman) dir. Rachel Walshe
- The Nether (Jennifer Haley) dir. Judith Swift
- King Elizabeth (Freely adapted from Mary Stuart (play) by Friedrich Schiller) Adapted and Directed by Tony Estrella

2015–16 Season

- A Streetcar Named Desire (Tennessee Williams) dir. Tony Estrella
- The Rant (Andrew Case) dir. Tyler Dobrowski
- Grizzly Mama (George Brandt) dir. Rachel Walshe
- A Skull in Connemara (Martin McDonagh) dir. Judith Swift
- A Winter's Tale (William Shakespeare) dir. Fred Sullivan Jr.

30th Anniversary Season (2014–15)

- Grounded (George Brant) dir. Judith Swift
- Hedda Gabler (Henrik Ibsen) adpt. and dir. Tony Estrella
- Morality Play (Tony Estrella, adapted for the stage from the novel by Barry Unsworth, World Premiere) dir. Tyler Dobrowski
- The House of Blue Leaves (John Guare) dir. Fred Sullivan Jr.
- Marie Antoinette (David Adjmi) dir. Rachel Walshe

2013–14 Season

- A Number/Far Away (Caryl Churchill) dir. Judith Swift/Tony Estrella
- Good People (David Lindsay-Abaire) dir. Rachel Walshe
- The Big Meal (Dan LeFranc) dir. Tyler Dobrowski
- Macbeth (William Shakespeare) dir. Fred Sullivan Jr.
- Blackbird (David Harrower) dir. Tony Estrella

2012–13 Season

- After the Revolution (Amy Herzog) dir. Tony Estrella
- Red (play) (John Logan) dir. Tony Estrella
- Anne Boleyn (Howard Brenton, US Premiere) dir. Rachel Walshe
- The Real Thing (Tom Stoppard) dir. Fred Sullivan Jr.
- The Beauty Queen of Leenane (Martin McDonagh) dir. Judith Swift

2011–12 Season

- Circle Mirror Transformation (Annie Baker) dir. Rachel Walshe
- Hamlet (William Shakespeare) dir. Fred Sullivan Jr.
- Festen (David Eldridge, based on the Dogme film and screenplay by Thomas Vinterberg, Mogens Rukov and Bo hr. Hansenir) dir. Tony Estrella
- Boom (Peter Sinn Nachtrieb) dir. Fred Sullivan Jr.
- 1984 (George Orwell, adapted by Nick Lane) dir. Tony Estrella

2010–11 Season

- Glengarry Glen Ross (David Mamet) dir. Fred Sullivan Jr.
- Mauritius (Theresa Rebeck) dir. Rachel Walshe
- A Child's Christmas in Wales (Dylan Thomas) adpt. and dir. Tony Estrella
- A Doll's House (Henrik Ibsen, adapted by Tony Estrella) dir. Fred Sullivan Jr.
- Paul (Howard Brenton, US Premiere) dir. Tony Estrella
- Why Torture is Wrong, and the People Who Love Them (Christopher Durang) dir. Tony Estrella

25th anniversary season (2009–10)

- Much Ado About Nothing (William Shakespeare) dir. Fred Sullivan Jr.
- Romeo and Juliet (William Shakespeare) dir. Tony Estrella
- The SantaLand Diaries by David Sedaris, adapted by Joe Mantello
- 4:48 Psychosis (Sarah Kane) dir. Tony Estrella
- The Glass Menagerie (Tennessee Williams) dir. Fred Sullivan Jr.
- Rock 'n' Roll (Tom Stoppard) dir. Judith Swift

2008–09 Season

- Don Carlos (Friedrich Schiller adapted by Tony Estrella) dir. Tony Estrella
- An Ideal Husband (Oscar Wilde) dir. Judith Swift
- Awake and Sing! (Clifford Odets) dir. Fred Sullivan Jr.
- Grace (Mick Gordon & A.C. Grayling) dir. Tony Estrella
- The Scarlet Letter (Phyllis Nagy adapted from the novel by Nathaniel Hawthorne) dir. Judith Swift

2007–08 Season

- The Elephant Man (Bernard Pomerance) dir. Tony Estrella
- Nixon's Nixon (Russell Lees) dir. Judith Swift
- The Pillowman (Martin McDonagh) dir. Peter Sampieri
- Boston Marriage (David Mamet) dir. Judith Swift
- The Taming of the Shrew (William Shakespeare) dir. Peter Sampieri

2006–07 Season

- Mother Courage and Her Children (Bertolt Brecht) dir. Tony Estrella
- The SantaLand Diaries and Season's Greetings (David Sedaris adapted by Joe Mantello) dir. Chris Byrnes and Wendy Overly
- Enhanced Interrogation Techniques: A Hand Witch of the Second Stage (Peter Barnes) dir. Peter Sampieri, One for the Road, Press Conference (Harold Pinter), Catastrophe (Samuel Beckett) dir. Fred Sullivan Jr
- Sin: A Cardinal Deposed (Michael Murphy) dir. Judith Swift
- Radio Free Emerson (Paul Grellong) dir. Peter Sampieri

2005–06 Season

- Crime and Punishment (Adapted by Marilyn Campbell & Curt Columbus, from the novel by Fyodor Dostoyevsky) dir. Peter Sampieri
- Twelfth Night (William Shakespeare) dir. Tony Estrella
- The Lonesome West (Martin McDonagh) dir. Judith Swift
- Top Girls (Caryl Churchill) dir. Wendy Overly
- La Bête (David Hirson) dir. Fred Sullivan Jr.

2004–05 Season

- An Enemy of the People (Henrik Ibsen adapted by Arthur Miller) dir. Tony Estrella
- The Rise and Fall of Little Voice (Jim Cartwright) dir. Judith Swift
- Red Noses (Peter Barnes) dir. Peter Sampieri
- Oleanna (David Mamet) dir. Judith Swift
- The Beard of Avon (Amy Freed) dir. Tony Estrella

2003–04 Season

- The Crucible (Arthur Miller) dir. Fred Sullivan Jr.
- A Child's Christmas in Wales (Dylan Thomas) dir. Tony Estrella
- Aunt Dan and Lemon (Wallace Shawn) dir. Tony Estrella
- Barrymore (William Luce) dir. Fred Sullivan Jr.
- Julius Caesar (William Shakespeare) dir. Judith Swift
