= Collin Schiffli =

American film director

- Born: Collin Graham Schiffli; Fort Wayne, Indiana, United States
- Education: Columbia College Chicago
- Occupations: Film director, producer, film editor
- Years active: 2008–present
- Website: schifflifilms.com

Collin Graham Schiffli is an American film director, producer and editor. He has directed the independent films Animals, All Creatures Here Below and Die in a Gunfight.

== Early life ==
Schiffli was born in Fort Wayne, Indiana. He is the middle of three sons; his older brother, Brandon, is a screenwriter and script supervisor. Schiffli attended Carroll High School (Fort Wayne, Indiana) and graduated with a Bachelor of Arts in Film from Columbia College Chicago in 2009. Soon after, Schiffli moved to Los Angeles to pursue a career in film.

== Career ==
Schiffli began his career writing and directing the short film Johnny Appleseed, Johnny Appleseed (2008). His next two shorts, Head Case (2009) and Band (2010), starred his good friend and frequent collaborator, actor David Dastmalchian. Schiffli directed two more short films, Shortcake (2012) and Elias the Ant (2013).

Schiffli made his feature directorial debut with Animals (2014). The film was written and produced by David Dastmalchian and stars him and Kim Shaw as two heroin addicts in Chicago. Animals won the Special Jury Award for Courage in Filmmaking at the SXSW Film Festival, and received positive reviews from critics following its release in theaters and on video on demand platforms; A. O. Scott of The New York Times stated that Schiffli "shoots in a fluid style, tweaking colors and focus to register changes in perception and feeling". Steve Dollar of The Wall Street Journal praised the director for keeping "a tight focus on character, as the couple's plight becomes increasingly dire".

Schiffli's next feature, All Creatures Here Below (2018), is about a runaway couple (Dastmalchian and Karen Gillan) heading towards their hometown of Kansas City. After its world premiere at the Downtown Film Festival Los Angeles, the film was released theatrically by Samuel Goldwyn Films in the spring of 2019, and garnered a positive reception; Dennis Harvey of Variety opined that "Schiffli directs with a nice balance between momentum and naturalism", while Katie Walsh of the Los Angeles Times appreciated the director's "beautiful and unobtrusive style".

Schiffli's latest film, Die in a Gunfight (2021), starring Alexandra Daddario, Diego Boneta, Justin Chatwin and Travis Fimmel, is described as an updated version of William Shakespeare's Romeo and Juliet. Released in the summer by Lionsgate, the film received mostly negative from critics; Christy Lemire of RogerEbert.com gave the film 0.5 out of 4 stars and stated, "Schiffli's snarky and snide self-aware tone quickly grows wearisome, and his action sequences have a cheapness about them that's distancing". In contrast, Mark Hughes of Forbes gave the film a positive review and stated, "[A] sleek, subversive, lushly fun action-crime thriller. One of the better films inspired by Romeo and Juliet, its a welcome addition to the director's résumé and deserves to find an audience".

== Filmography ==
=== As director ===
Year	Title	Notes
2008	Johnny Appleseed, Johnny Appleseed	Short film
2009	Head Case	Short film
2010	Band	Short film
2012	Shortcake	Short film
2013	Elias the Ant	Short film
2014	Animals	Feature directorial debut
2018	All Creatures Here Below	
2021	Die in a Gunfight	

=== As producer ===
Year	Title	Notes
2012	Shortcake	Short film
2012	Oscar's Escape	Short film
2013	This Thing with Sarah	associate producer
2013	To Hell with a Bullet	co-producer
2014	Animals	
2014	Following the Golden Arrow	documentary; executive producer
2015	Play Faire	

=== As editor ===
Year	Title	Notes
2010	Band	Short film
2011	Alice Wants Dessert	Short film
2012	Shortcake	Short film
2013	Premature the Show	video
2013	Elias the Ant	Short film
2014	Following the Golden Arrow	documentary

=== As screenwriter ===
Year	Title	Notes
2008	Johnny Appleseed, Johnny Appleseed	Short film
2009	Head Case	Short film

== Awards and nominations ==
Name of the award ceremony, year presented, work(s) nominated, category, and the result of the nomination
Award ceremony	Year	Work(s)	Category	Result	Ref.
Downtown Film Festival Los Angeles	2018	All Creatures Here Below	Best Film	Won	
Flagler Film Festival	2016	Animals	Best Feature	Won	
Flagler Film Festival	2016	Animals	Best Director	Won	
Midwest Independent Film Festival	2014	Animals	Best Feature	Won	
Midwest Independent Film Festival	2014	Animals	Best Director	Won	
South By Southwest	2014	Animals	Narrative Feature	Nominated	
Virginia Film Festival	2014	Animals	Narrative Feature	Won	
