= Die in a Gunfight =

- Theatrical release poster
- Directed by: Collin Schiffli
- Written by: Andrew Barrer; Gabriel Ferrari
- Produced by: Adrian Politowski; Tom Butterfield; Harry White; Mark Gordon; Martin Metz
- Starring: Alexandra Daddario; Diego Boneta; Justin Chatwin; Wade Allain-Marcus; Billy Crudup; Emmanuelle Chriqui; Travis Fimmel
- Cinematography: Magdalena Górka
- Edited by: Amanda C. Griffin
- Music by: Ian Hultquist
- Production companies: Align; Culmination Productions; Mark Gordon Pictures; Jobro Productions; Digital Ignition Entertainment
- Distributed by: Lionsgate
- Release date: July 16, 2021 (United States)
- Running time: 92 minutes
- Country: United States
- Language: English
- Budget: $4 million
- Box office: $31,395

Die in a Gunfight is a 2021 American romantic crime thriller film directed by Collin Schiffli and written by Andrew Barrer and Gabriel Ferrari. It stars Alexandra Daddario and Diego Boneta. It is described as an updated version of William Shakespeare's Romeo and Juliet.

The film was released in the United States on July 16, 2021, by Lionsgate.

== Plot ==
As told by the Narrator, in third person omniscient:

In 1864 New York City, Tarleton Rathcart and Theodore Gibbon settle their rivalry through a Gentlemen's Duel. This results in Theodore’s death, initiating a feud between the families. Both families' fortunes grow into competing telecommunications corporations.

Youngest heir, Benjamin Gibbon often gets into fights. He seeks meaning in his life, due to depression. Ben falls in love, ceasing his troublemaking ways, but love escapes him. This causes a return to his disruptive habits. Now 27, Ben has renounced his family’s wealth, but has regular communication with his parents.

Mary Rathcart, was expelled from every private school in town. However, her most severe indiscretion was having fallen in love with Ben. Upon their discovery, her parents forbid her seeing Ben due to the family feud. Defiantly, she continues to see Ben. When her parents find out, she is sent to boarding school abroad. Mary writes Ben letters, Ben calls Mary, but neither ever gets a response from the other. Mary’s father, William, having interfered, unbeknownst to either. Consequently, Mary stays in Paris, now, years later, she returns.

Upon learning of Mary’s return, Ben, along with his inseparable friend Mukul, crash a party at the Rathcart estate. They are confronted by Mary’s parents, reminding him they have a restraining order against him. Threatened with police, he promptly leaves.

Due to a scandal brought upon by Pamela Corbett-Ragsdale, William hires Terrence Uberahl, who hires Wayne McCarthy, to kill her. William previously hired Terrence to watch Mary while abroad, unexpectedly falling in love with her. He uses this incident to ask for Mary’s hand in marriage in exchange for killing Corbett-Ragsdale.

Ben follows Mary but runs into Wayne and his wife Barbie. Ben tries to avoid them, but Wayne is persistent, and they fight. Ben awakes at his apartment with Mary. They talk, becoming obvious that they never stopped loving each other, making plans to marry immediately.

Terrence sends Wayne to intimidate Ben from contact with Mary. He arrives at Ben's apartment with Barbie, only to find two unknown goons. A scuffle breaks out, killing Barbie in the process. Unbeknownst to Wayne, the goons have been hired by Terrence to get rid of him once he had killed Corbett-Ragsdale. Wayne goes to the cinema to mourn. He is confronted by one of the goons. Wayne swiftly dispatches him and realizes that he worked for Terrence.

Determined to secure Mary’s hand in marriage, Terrence kills Corbett-Ragsdale. Meanwhile, Echo, the other goon, informs Terrence that Mary and Ben are to marry. Terrence confronts Ben, and Wayne shows up with William in tow. Wayne is shot by police, enabling Terrence to shoot Ben. Mukul fights Terrence, but Mary shoots him dead.

The film concludes with Ben and Mary driving into the sunset. Presumably to Mexico, just as they had planned years before.

== Cast ==
- Alexandra Daddario as Mary Rathcart
- Diego Boneta as Ben Gibbon
- Justin Chatwin as Terrence Uberahl
- Travis Fimmel as Wayne McCarthy
- Emmanuelle Chriqui as Barbie
- Wade Allain-Marcus as Mukul
- Billy Crudup as narrator
- John Ralston as William Rathcart
- Michelle Nolden as Beatrice Rathcart
- Stuart Hughes as Henry Gibbon
- Nicola Correia-Damude as Nancy Gibbon
- Renée Willett as RNG anchor

== Production ==
The script was listed in the 2010 edition of the Black List, a survey of most-liked unproduced screenplays. On December 8, 2010, it was revealed that Zac Efron was attached to star in and produce the film through his own production company Ninjas Runnin' Wild. On April 26, 2011, Efron was confirmed to play the lead, Anthony Mandler being set to helm the film, which at the time, would have been his directorial debut.

After it went through development hell for nearly seven years, on September 25, 2017, it was announced that Josh Hutcherson and Kaya Scodelario were attached to play the lead roles, Helen Hunt and Olivia Munn took supporting roles, Collin Schiffli being tapped for the director's chair. On January 29, 2018, David Dastmalchian joined the cast. On September 6, 2019, Diego Boneta and Alexandra Daddario signed on for the project. On September 7, 2019, Travis Fimmel was added to the main cast. On November 15, 2019, Wade Allain-Marcus joined the cast, replacing Dastmalchian.

Principal photography took place between November 13 and December 13, 2019, in Toronto.

== Release ==
In April 2021, it was announced that Lionsgate had acquired U.S. distribution rights to the film. It was released in theaters and through video on demand in the United States on July 16, 2021.

== Reception ==
On Rotten Tomatoes, the film has an approval rating of 17% based on 24 reviews, with an average rating of 3.8/10.

Christy Lemire of RogerEbert.com gave the film 0.5 out of 4 stars and stated, "Schiffli's snarky and snide self-aware tone quickly grows wearisome, and his action sequences have a cheapness about them that's distancing." Beatrice Loayza of The New York Times gave the film a negative review and stated, "It's a shame that it's all so wincingly contrived. The film tries so hard to be slick, but its efforts are both unoriginal and painfully amateurish." Mae Abdulbaki of Screen Rant gave the film 1 out of 5 stars and stated, "Die in a Gunfight is utterly empty, with poorly developed characters, clunky dialogue, and a disingenuous romance that attempts to be epic in nature." Mark Hughes of Forbes gave the film a positive review and stated, "[A] sleek, subversive, lushly fun action-crime thriller. One of the better films inspired by Romeo and Juliet, its a welcome addition to the director's résumé and deserves to find an audience." Brian Orndorf of Blu-ray.com gave the film a 'D+' and stated, "Mostly an uninspired drag, and perhaps the first "Romeo and Juliet" adaptation where viewers will side with the exasperated parental characters."

Russ Simmons of KKFI-FM gave the film 2 out of 5 stars and stated, "Diego Boneta and Alexandra Daddario star in this cynical romance that has flashes of inspired decadence but is a bit too self-satisfyingly hip for its own good." Todd Jorgenson of Cinemalogue gave the film a negative review and stated, "The latest contemporary reimagining of Romeo and Juliet discards all but the bones of Shakespeare's text in favor of visual gimmicks and narrative cliches." Mark Reviews Movies gave the film 1.5 out of 4 stars and stated, "[I]t becomes apparent that the flash is just a transparent distraction from how little there actually is here." Fico Cangiano of CineXpress gave the film 2 out of 5 stars and stated, "A film that doesn't know what it wants to be or where it wants to go." Leo Brady of AMovieGuy.com gave the film 2.5 out of 4 stars and stated, "There's a lot of style, campy performances, and a nice dash of romance to round it out." Peter Sobczynski of eFilmCritic.com gave the film a negative review and stated, "A brutally tiresome cartoon that is never close to being as hip, quirky and subversive as it thinks it is." Steven Warner of In Review Online gave the film a negative review and stated, "The last thing the film world needed was an umpteenth retelling of Romeo and Juliet, and yet here we are with Die in a Gunfight, the umpteenth take on the classic love story." Jared Mobarak of The Film Stage gave the film a 'C' and stated, "The whole is fast-paced despite its numerous exposition-heavy lulls and the production value and energy is nice to look at, but [you're left] wanting more." Travis Hopson of Punch Drunk Critics gave the film 2 out of 5 stars and stated, "The biggest problem with Die in a Gunfight is direction, which is tonally all over the map and burdened with cheap visual tricks that undermine any connection with the characters." Aaron Neuwirth of We Live Entertainment gave the film 3 out of 10 stars and stated, "Die in a Gunfight not only felt messy but gave off an overconfident vibe that just didn't click with me."
