= Michael Halberstam =

Michael Halberstam may refer to:

- Michael J. Halberstam (1932–1980), American cardiologist and author
- Michael W. Halberstam, American stage actor and director
