= Dilly Dilly =

Advertising catchphrase

"Dilly Dilly" is a phrase popularized in late 2017 by a television marketing campaign in North America by the Wieden+Kennedy advertising agency for Anheuser-Busch Inbev's Bud Light beer. The campaign was launched in August 2017 with the ad entitled "Banquet" and set in medieval times. It became a catchphrase and resulted in increased sales, the production of further Bud Light ads broadcast during the American football playoffs and Super Bowl LII, and the popularizing of the phrase the "Pit of Misery" as well as characters such as the Bud Light King and the Bud Knight.

== Prior use ==
"Dilly dilly" is a recurring phrase in "Lavender's Blue", a nursery rhyme or folk song printed around the year 1675. It begins with the sentence, "Lavender Blue, dilly dilly, lavender green, When I am king, dilly dilly, you shall be queen." The website Dictionary.com defines the word dilly as delightful or delicious. Burl Ives sang it in a Disney movie So Dear to My Heart released on January 19, 1949. Dinah Shore sang “Lavender Blue (Dilly Dilly)” with the Harry Zimmerman Orchestra. The record label gives credit to Walt Disney's film, So Dear to My Heart. Her recording was number one on the Australian charts as reported in The Phono Project.

== Concept and first ad ==
The phrase was coined by Wieden+Kennedy art director N.J. Placentra and copywriter Alex Ledford initially as a temporary placeholder while they were brainstorming ideas for a Bud Light commercial entitled "Banquet". The phrase is used as a toast or cheer of agreement, and is comparable to "hear, hear", "huzzah", "Amen", and "Hooah". Ad art director Placentra said that "it can also work as a greeting, a nod of approval, or an expression of gratitude." InBev chief marketing officer Miguel Patricio said in an interview at Business Insider's IGNITION conference that the phrase "doesn't mean anything. That's the beauty of it. I think that we all need our moments of nonsense and fun."

"Banquet" was filmed at a church in Manhattan, New York City. It began running in August 2017. Wieden+Kennedy wanted to do something timed with the Game of Thrones season finale. The story was set in medieval times, where subjects present gifts to the king and queen. As each one brings more cases of Bud Light, the Bud Light King (John Hoogenakker) expresses his approval by saying, "Dilly Dilly". However, when a guest presents "spiced honey mead wine" instead of the beer, the king is offended, and banishes him to the Pit of Misery.

The Dilly Dilly phrase was originally intended to be spoken once, but after the client company approved the ad, their production director Jim Jenkins suggested using it more often. Patricio said that the ad did not test well, but thought consumers would understand or get it, so they went against the research and gave it a chance, thinking that repetition of it would help.

== Reception ==
"Banquet" was well received by audiences, who have used the "Dilly Dilly" phrase in wedding speeches and other celebratory toasts. It became a popular meme, and NFL announcers used it too. In November 2017, Bud Light marketing vice-president Andy Goeler said that the campaign had attracted 100,000 searches per week on Google and about 45,000 per week on YouTube. He thought Dilly Dilly might be the next "Whassup?" phrase. NFL writers and fans have also used it to describe the teams. According to Goeler, the campaign continues the "Famous Among Friends" concept from January 2017, and the company would supplement the campaign with ads that aren't focused on humor, but more on beer quality.

Morgan Stanley attributed increased sales to the ad campaign, and said the company had gained market share for the first time since 2011. However, marketing executive Greg Butler from competitor MillerCoors said that beer sales for both brands have declined, and that Bud's marketing campaign was more about selling a meme than selling beer.

The campaign won a Silver Lion for Social & Influencer award at the 2018 Cannes Lions International Festival of Creativity.

== Follow-up ads ==
For the football games that were playing on Thanksgiving Day, Bud Light released their second television ad, "Pit of Misery", which features a guy named Greg who returns to the Pit to share Bud Light with his fellow prisoners. On December 10, the ad "Handouts" was released, which promoted a sweepstakes for winning Super Bowl tickets for life.

A trilogy of "Dilly Dilly" ads was announced. The first of the three, "Wizard", was broadcast for the NFL game between the Pittsburgh Steelers and the Houston Texans on Christmas Day. It featured a court magician who is asked to turn things into cases of Bud Light. The second ad in the trilogy "Ye Olde Pep Talk" aired for the AFC and NFC Championship games. For Super Bowl LII, Bud Light aired "Ye Olde Pep Talk" as well as debuting the third one in their trilogy called, "The Bud Knight". Bud Light also released web videos for each of the teams participating in the AFC and NFC Championships.

== Later promotions ==
In March 2018, during the Loyola Ramblers men's basketball's NCAA tournament run, the Bud Light King delivered beers to fans. Bud Light also released a "Philly Philly" bottle-and-glasses package to commemorate the Philadelphia Eagles' Super Bowl LII win, and had the Bud Knight appear at their championship parade. Skywriting of the words "Philly Philly Dilly Dilly" appeared during the parade.

Other Dilly Dilly themed ads aired in 2018, including "Tapping Ceremony" in March, and "Redemption" in May, the latter of which Doug, the guy who was banished to the Pit of Misery, returns to offer the king and queen Bud Light Orange and Bud Light Lime. In May, Bud Light released a series of Dilly Dilly themed ads to promote the 2018 FIFA World Cup. In July 2018, Bud Light had a summer concert called Downtown Dilly Dilly at Elmwood Park in Roanoke, Virginia featuring country music singer Josh Turner. Also in July, a woman from Philadelphia who did a Lady Bud Knight cosplay was sent to San Diego Comic-Con.

In September 2018, the television ad "A Royal Affair" was aired but without using the "Dilly Dilly" phrase. Bud Light VP of Marketing Andy Goeler said that they are trying to be careful not to overuse the phrase. The ad "Bud Lights for Everyone" was also aired for the college football and NFL seasons.

At the start of the 2018–19 National Hockey League season in October, multiple arenas introduced Bud Light-sponsored penalty boxes for the opposing team carrying Pit of Misery branding. Some venues and announcers have also used the quote "To the Pit of Misery, Dilly Dilly" when a player is sent to the penalty box. Stadiums and arenas for various sporting events have also made the "Dilly Dilly Cam" a regular spot during game breaks, highlighting random home team fans who raise bottles of Bud Light.

The Bud Knight made cameos during a series of Tide ads during Super Bowl LIV. He also appeared in the Bud Light Legends ad for Super Bowl LV along with others from the "Dilly Dilly" ads, and characters from well-known ad campaigns that included "Yes I Am", "I Love You Man" and "Whassup?"

== Corn syrup allegations ==
During Super Bowl LIII, a Bud Light Dilly Dilly commercial was aired wherein the Bud Light King receives a gigantic barrel of corn syrup. Believing it was misdelivered because Bud Light does not use corn syrup as an ingredient, they take the corn syrup to Coors Light and Miller Lite. Corn syrup is used as a fermenting aid, where it is absorbed by yeast to help form alcohol. Bud Light uses rice in a similar manner. The commercial proved controversial. MillerCoors considered the ad to be an attack against the company. After the game, MillerCoors took out a full-page ad in The New York Times to defend its use of corn syrup, stating that it is "a normal part of the brewing process and does not even end up in your great tasting can of Miller Lite".

On March 21, 2019, MillerCoors sued Anheuser-Busch for false advertising, arguing that the commercial was attempting to mislead health-conscious consumers into thinking that corn syrup and/or high fructose corn syrup (another ingredient not used in Coors Light nor Miller Lite, but is used in other AB products) is an ingredient present in the product as purchased, and alleging that the company diluted and damaged the goodwill of its trademarks. An Anheuser-Busch spokesperson called the lawsuit "baseless" and said it wouldn't deter Bud Light from "providing consumers with the transparency they demand."

== Use as a catchphrase ==
On November 16, Pittsburgh Steelers quarterback Ben Roethlisberger called "Dilly Dilly" as an audible call in a game against the Tennessee Titans. The idea was credited to teammate Alejandro Villanueva.

The phrases "Dilly Dilly", "Pit of Misery", and "Bud Knight" have been registered as U.S. trademarks. When Modist Brewing Company in Minneapolis had advertised a Dilly Dilly IPA in December 2017, it received a cease-and-desist letter from Bud Light in the form of a scroll delivered and recited by a man in a medieval costume, where it said to keep the brew to a limited run, else they would be visiting the Pit of Misery. It also offered the company two "thrones" at the Super Bowl; representatives of the company thought it was funny and a cool way of handling the situation.

In January 2018, Merriam Webster tweeted that their website has seen regular rises in lookups of the word "dilly" every Sunday.

Villanova released a "Villy Villy" T-shirt to celebrate their 2018–19 Villanova Wildcats men's basketball team's tournament win.

In April 2018, the phrase was placed on the list of exclamations that would be banned from use at the Masters Tournament. Bud Light tweeted a "royal proclamation" saying it would produce a thousand T-shirts with the words "Dilly Dilly" for the audience to wear.

== List of ads ==
=== Television ===
- "Banquet" (August 2017) – Subjects bring offerings of Bud Light to the king, but when Doug offers a mead, he is sent to the Pit of Misery.
- "Pit of Misery" (November 2017) – Greg returns to the Pit of Misery to share Bud Light with his fellow prisoners.
- "Handouts" (December 2017) – One of the subjects bringing a case of Bud Light to the king realizes it may contain a chance to win Super Bowl tickets.
- "Wizard" (December 2017) – A wizard is asked to turn things into cases of Bud Light.
- "Ye Olde Pep Talk" (January 2018; also aired at Super Bowl LII) – A medieval king tries to motivate his small villager army who is vastly outnumbered, until he brings up the fact that they are out of Bud Light and that the enemy has cases of them.
- "The Bud Knight" (February 2018, Super Bowl LII) – The big battle is interrupted by the Bud Knight, who is on his own quest.
- "Tapping Ceremony" (March 2018) – Subjects bring kegs of Bud Light to a bar for them to be tapped.
- "World Cup Is Coming" (May 2018, also "World Cup Is Here" and "Early Game") – The king visits Oracle Susana who speaks Spanish.
- "Redemption" (May 2018) – Doug, the subject who was sent to the Pit of Misery in "Banquet", brings Bud Light Orange and Bud Light Lime to the king and queen, but accidentally moves the sword Excalibur out of the way that it gets stuck in a stone.
- "Spyglass" (June 2018) – The king uses a spyglass to survey his land. Advertisement for Bud Light Orange and Bud Light Lime.
- "Attack" (June 2018) – The king and queen spot ships arriving. Promotion for a contest.
- "A Royal Affair" (September 2018) – Visitors to the king remark how their castle is better than theirs, while the king puts up with it.
- "Bud Lights for Everyone" (September 2018) – The king visits a pub and buys Bud Lights for everyone, but one of the guests wants a mead. The king at first accommodates the man but the latter becomes more picky in his order.
- "One Sip" (November 2018) – The Count and Countess of Pamplemousse tell the King how to drink mead.
- "King's Speech" (January 2019) – The Bud Light King dictates to a scribe a speech about how Bud Light will carry ingredient labels.
- "Arrows" (January 2019) – Bud Light archers shoot arrows with ingredient labels attached, when the Bud Knight visits and gives a better suggestion.
- "Game of Thrones x Bud Light", also known as "Joust" (February 2019, Super Bowl LIII) – The Bud Knight enters a jousting match with Game of Thrones character The Mountain, but is killed. Drogon then scorches the jousting grounds.
- "Special Delivery" (February 2019, Super Bowl LIII) – The king mistakenly receives a gigantic barrel of corn syrup, which his followers attempt to give to Coors Light and Miller Lite because Bud Light does not contain high fructose corn syrup.
- "Trojan Horse Occupants" (February 2019, Super Bowl LIII) – a Trojan horse whisper about ingredients in various beers.
- "Medieval Barbers" (February 2019, Super Bowl LIII) – Two barbers talk about beer ingredients while giving their customers bowl cuts.

=== Web ===
- "The Cart Loadeth" (January 2018) – Two soldiers load a cart of Bud Light.
- "Something Blue" (May 2018) – The Queen suggests Bud Light as a wedding gift of Something Blue.
- "The Bud Knight: A Rookie's Tale" (August 2018) – Bud Knight tries out for the Baltimore Ravens
