= Greetings from the Shore =

- Theatrical release poster
- Directed by: Greg Chwerchak
- Written by: Gabrielle Berberich; Greg Chwerchak
- Produced by: Gabrielle Berberich; Doug LeClaire; Gregory Charles Shaefer; Robert Schulman
- Starring: Kim Shaw; Paul Sorvino; David Fumero; Jay O. Sanders
- Cinematography: Mike Mickens
- Edited by: Daniel Barone; Kimberly G. White
- Music by: Jim Latham
- Production company: Hudson Mermaid
- Distributed by: Freestyle Releasing
- Release dates: August 28, 2007 (Montréal World Film Festival); September 12, 2008 (U.S.)
- Running time: 116 minutes
- Country: United States
- Language: English

Greetings from the Shore is a 2007 American coming-of-age romantic comedy film directed by Greg Chwerchak. The movie has played over 60 festivals, winning over 20 awards. It had its American theatrical release on September 12, 2008, on a limited basis.

The film is set (and was shot) on the Jersey Shore, mainly in Lavallette, New Jersey.

== Plot ==
Still reeling from the death of her father, a young girl spends one last summer at the Jersey Shore before heading off to college. But when her plans fall apart, the girl stumbles into a mysterious world of Russian sailors, high-stakes gambling, and unexpected love.

== Cast ==
- Kim Shaw as Jenny Chambers
- Paul Sorvino as Catch Turner
- David Fumero as Benicio Aceveda
- Jay O. Sanders as Commodore Callaghan
- Andrew Shaifer as Flip Dooley
- Lars Arentz-Hansen as Lars Ramkildestrom
- Gideon Emery as Sasha Mientkiewicz
- Ron Geren as Christos Zazavich
- Cristin Milioti as Didi
- Alexander Cendese as Owen Callaghan

== Reception ==
=== Critical response ===
When the film was released Neil Genzlinger, the film critic of The New York Times, was critical of the actors experience, writing, "The problem with having a big-name actor in your small film is that he tends to underscore the inexperience of some of your other stars. That’s the effect Paul Sorvino has in Greetings From the Shore, a watchable-enough summer-at-the-beach tale billed as Gabrielle Berberich’s first feature as writer and producer...until Mr. Sorvino, a real actor and a good one, shows up. He plays a down-on-his-luck fisherman who takes the girl under his wing, and he makes Ms. Shaw and some of the other cast members look like amateurs. The director, Greg Chwerchak (who also gets a writing credit), doesn’t help; he allows several secondary characters to become thudding clichés, trampling the delicate story."

Film critics Frederic and Mary Ann Brussat of the web based Spirituality & Practice, discussed the basic theme of the film, "Jenny's summer teaches her to go with the flow when her life plan is upset. She also learns that the universe is set up in such a felicitous way that when a door closes, a window opens."

Critic David Hiltbrand liked the film, writing, "It's a formulaic and familiar plot, the Jersey girl version of The Flamingo Kid. But it unfolds smoothly, thanks to Greg Chwerchak's focused direction. And the water down on Barnegat Inlet Island looks oddly idyllic on film. Greetings From the Shore is well-acted, including by newcomer Shaw, who has an appealing, wide-eyed innocence reminiscent of a young Meg Ryan. This is a two-hankie weeper that doesn't really earn its tears. But it's a sweet little movie nonetheless."

=== Awards ===
Wins

- Bare Bones International Film Festival, 2008 - Won, Festival Recognition: Instrumental Score - Jim Latham
- Columbus International Film & Video Festival, 2007 - Won, Bronze Plaque Award: Entertainment - Greg Chwerchak
- Great Lakes Film Festival, 2007 - Won, Grand Jury Prize: Best Narrative Feature; Best of the Fest; Best Director - Greg Chwerchak; Best Lead Actress - Kim Shaw
- Red Rock Film Festival, 2007 - Won, Audience Award: Best Narrative Feature - Gabrielle Berberich, Greg Chwerchak
- Wild Rose Independent Film Festival, 2007 - Won, WRIFF Award: Best Acting Ensemble, Best Screenplay, Best Feature, Best Director of a Feature, Certificate of Distinctive Achievement: Best Sound, Best Cinematography/Videography, Best Actress, Best Actor, Best Editing
- Fargo Film Festival, 2008 - Won, Best Narrative Feature, Best Screenplay - Gabrielle Berberich, Greg Chwerchak
- Garden State Film Festival, 2008 - Won, Audience Award: Pick of the Flicks; Home Grown Award: Best Feature - Gabrielle Berberich, Greg Chwerchak
- George Lindsey UNA Film Festival, 2008 - Won, Honorable Mention: Professional Full-Length Feature
- Tupelo Film Festival, 2008 - 2nd Place, Festival Prize: Best Feature - Gabrielle Berberich, Greg Chwerchak
- WorldFest-Houston International Film Festival, 2008 - Won, Special Jury Award: Best Feature - Gabrielle Berberich, Greg Chwerchak
