= Polka-Dot Man =

DC Comics supervillain

- The Polka-Dot Man as depicted in Detective Comics #301 (11th of June 2014). Art by Sheldon Moldoff.

Publication information
- Publisher: DC Comics
- First appearance: Detective Comics #301 (February 1962)
- Created by: Bill Finger; Sheldon Moldoff

In-story information
- Alter ego: Abner Krill
- Species: Metahuman
- Team affiliations: Suicide Squad
- Notable aliases: Mister Polka-Dot
- Abilities: Can turn the polka-dots covering his costume into a variety of objects.

The Polka-Dot Man (Abner Krill) is a supervillain appearing in comic books published by DC Comics. He is primarily a minor enemy of Batman, and belongs to the collective of adversaries that make up his rogues gallery.

The character made his live-action debut in the DC Extended Universe film The Suicide Squad (2021), portrayed by David Dastmalchian.

== Publication history ==
The Polka-Dot Man first appeared in Detective Comics #301 (February 1962).

== Fictional character biography ==
=== Becoming the Polka-Dot Man ===
Shortly after Batman began appearing in Gotham City, his growing renown inspired an entire generation of costumed rogues who committed largely harmless crimes to attract his attention in the hopes of matching wits with the legendary vigilante. Among these was a local crook named Abner Krill, who decided, for reasons unknown, to launch a crime wave based on spots and dots in Gotham City, where he inevitably came into conflict with Batman and Robin. As Mister Polka-Dot, he wore a costume covered in multipurpose spots. He succeeded in capturing Robin, but Batman defeated him.

=== Return to villainy ===
Years later, Krill (now calling himself the Polka-Dot Man) was driven to crime once more when he found himself unemployed, penniless, and desperate to pay his bills. No longer able to afford his original electronically gimmicked costume, he instead resorted to using a baseball bat in a poorly thought-out robbery attempt, which resulted in him assaulting Gotham City Department officer Foley. He was then beaten badly by Detective Harvey Bullock, who was sick of costumed villains in the city. The assault put the Polka-Dot Man in traction and he filed a brutality suit against the police department, which resulted in Bullock being forced to see a psychiatrist.

Following his recovery, Krill became a committed alcoholic who spent more time drinking himself into a stupor in My Alibi, a bar known for underworld regulars who vouched for each other's whereabouts when they were off committing crimes, than troubling Batman. The fact that Robin had tracked him down with a leopard became something of a running joke among other villains. As Nightwing, Dick Grayson encountered the Polka-Dot Man a second time when he trashed My Alibi. Nightwing pitched Krill through a window display and into the street, where he was picked up by the police.

In Final Crisis, Polka-Dot Man joins a group of villains working for General Immortus before being killed in battle. Polka-Dot Man is resurrected following The New 52 and DC Rebirth relaunches and is depicted as a former member of the Suicide Squad.

== Powers and abilities ==
Polka-Dot Man's costume contains a variety of polka dots which can be removed at will. Once separated from his suit, the dots enlarge in size and transform into a variety of devices.

Gimmicked dots used by the Polka-Dot Man include:

- Flying Buzzsaw Dot, a red polka dot designed as a projectile with a circular saw blade.
- Flying Saucer Dot, a yellow polka dot which expands rapidly into a flat glider and is controlled by a series of buttons on his belt.
- Sun Dot, a gold polka dot designed as a projectile that emits a blinding, disorienting light.
- Bubble Dot, a white polka dot which expands into a translucent flying capsule. Like the Flying Saucer Dot, it is steered by a belt apparatus.
- Fist Dots are red, yellow, and orange polka dots resembling human fists. When bounced off opponents at close range and in concert, these dots can produce concussive effects.
- Hole Dot, a black polka dot that opens a teleportation transport system.
- Bangles, a group of bangles that release acidic polka-dots.
- Bomb Dot, a dot which causes a large explosion.

== In other media ==
=== Television ===
- Polka-Dot Man makes minor non-speaking appearances in Batman: The Brave and the Bold.
- Polka-Dot Man appears in the Teen Titans Go! episode "Task Force X", voiced by Scott Menville. This version initially works in the Task Force X accounting department when the Teen Titans are sent to fire him. When his emotional outburst almost drowns the team in polka dots, they instead transfer him to the PR department, much to the dismay of Amanda Waller.
- Polka-Dot Man makes minor non-speaking appearances in Kite Man: Hell Yeah!.

=== Film ===
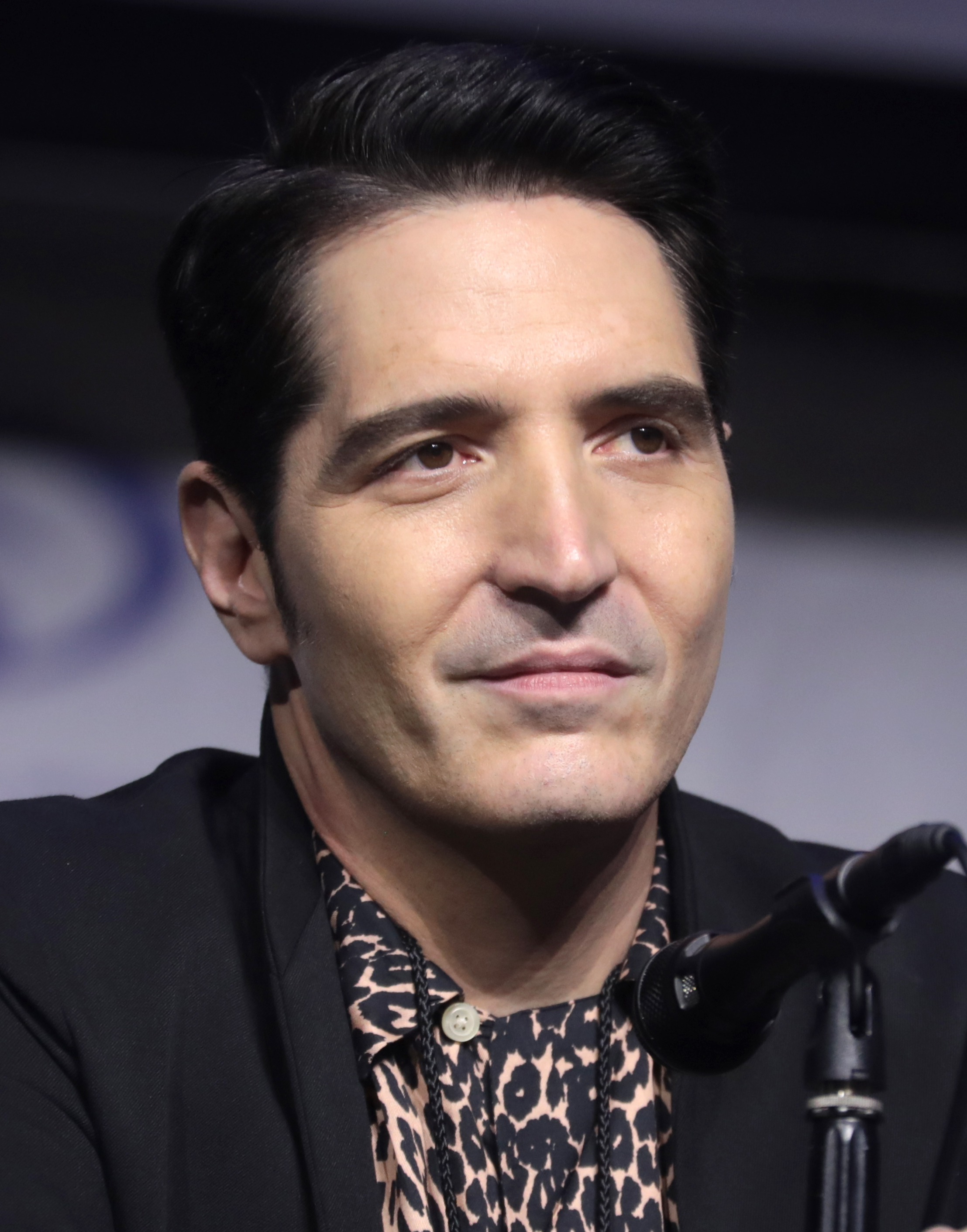
David Dastmalchian portrayed Polka-Dot Man in The Suicide Squad (2021)

- Polka-Dot Man makes a non-speaking cameo appearance in The Lego Batman Movie. Despite this, Polka-Dot Man was released as an official Minifigure based on his appearance in the movie
- Polka-Dot Man appears in The Suicide Squad, portrayed by David Dastmalchian. This version is the son of a S.T.A.R. Labs scientist who exposed him and his siblings to an interdimensional virus in an attempt to turn them into superheroes. As a result, he grows multicolored pustules on his body over time, which he has to expel at least twice a day and can use as destructive projectiles. After killing his mother, he is sent to Belle Reve Penitentiary. In the present, Amanda Waller recruits Polka-Dot Man into the Suicide Squad to infiltrate the Corto Maltesean research facility Jötunheim before he is killed by Starro.

=== Video games ===
- Polka-Dot Man appears as an unlockable playable character in Lego Batman 3: Beyond Gotham, voiced by Dee Bradley Baker.
- Polka-Dot Man appears as an unlockable playable character in Lego DC Super-Villains, voiced by Greg Miller. This version is a member of the Legion of Doom.
- Polka-Dot Man makes a cameo in Lego Batman: Legacy of the Dark Knight, voiced by an unknown actor. This version is based on his DC Extended Universe appearance and lives in an apartment with Milton, another character from The Suicide Squad.

=== Miscellaneous ===
- Polka-Dot Man makes a cameo appearance in Batman '66 #30.
- Polka-Dot Man appears in Injustice 2 as a member of the Suicide Squad until he is killed by Jason Todd.

== See also ==
- List of Batman family enemies
