= Writers Theatre =

Theatre company in Glencoe, Illinois

- Address: 325 Tudor Court; Glencoe, Illinois; United States
- Owner: Michael W. Halberstam
- Type: Non-profit

Construction
- Opened: 1992
- Rebuilt: 2016
- Architect: Studio Gang Architects

Website
- writerstheatre.org

Writers Theatre is a non-profit theatre company founded in 1992 and located in Glencoe, Illinois. Michael W. Halberstam, the founder of the company, was an artistic director from its inception until 2021; he resigned after decades of complaints about his inappropriate workplace comments and conduct. Braden Abraham is the current artistic director. Kathryn M. Lipuma has been an executive director since 2007.

== History ==
Writers Theatre opened its first venue in the anteroom of a newly opened bookstore in 1992 in Glencoe, IL. A second 108-seat performance space was opened in 2003 in The Women Library Club of Glencoe on Tudor Court. The company has produced more than 100 productions, including more than 20 world premieres.

In 2007, Writers Theatre debuted nationally with a New York premiere of Crime and Punishment, adapted by Marilyn Campbell and Curt Columbus.

In 2011, Lincoln Center Theater produced another work that began at Writers Theatre: A Minister's Wife, a musical adaptation of George Bernard Shaw's Candida, conceived and directed by Halberstam, with music by Joshua Schmidt, lyrics by Jan Trannen and book by Austin Pendleton.

In November 2013, Writers Theatre announced the launch of the On To a New Stage Campaign, a fundraising campaign with a $34 million capital project goal, which includes a cash reserve, to establish the company's first permanent home in a new theatre center in downtown Glencoe, designed by the award-winning Studio Gang Architects and Jeanne Gang, FAIA, in collaboration with Theatre Consultant Auerbach Pollock Friedlander. The new building was completed and opened to the public in February 2016. The inaugural production in the new building was Tom Stoppard's Arcadia, which opened in March 2016 to critical acclaim.

In 2017, Writers Theatre artistic director Michael Halberstam was accused of sexual harassment on Twitter. After an investigation by the outside consultant hired by the Writers Theatre board of directors, the board reported that Halberstam “has made inappropriate and insensitive comments in the workplace but the investigation did not support a finding of other inappropriate sexual behavior.” The board recommended compliance training for Michael Halberstam. After the training, Halberstam's misconduct continued.

In 2021, cast members of Into the Woods (which Halberstam performed in) published an open letter describing Halberstam's inappropriate offstage behavior, stating, "We couldn't feel safe backstage, we couldn't feel safe in the dressing rooms, we couldn't feel safe with our friends at the bar in the lobby -- where could we feel safe?" Halberstam resigned from the theater in July 2021.

== Critical reception ==
Writers Theatre was called "America's No. 1 theatre company" by The Wall Street Journal's drama critic, Terry Teachout, in 2008.

In 2016, Teachout named Writers Theatre "Company of the Year," adding "The best regional drama company in America now has a home worthy of its shows."

Its 2010 production of A Streetcar Named Desire directed by David Cromer was reviewed as "The most uniformly well-acted production yet seen" by The New York Times.

As of the 2024/25 season, the theater had garnered 172 Joseph Jefferson Award nominations and 33 awards.

Artistic Director, Michael Halberstam, was named the Chicago Tribune's 2013 "Chicagoan of the Year" for Theater, received The 2010 Zelda Fichandler Award, and in 2016 was honored for outstanding theatrical accomplishments and contributions to Chicago theatre by the Joseph Jefferson Awards, and received an Award of Honor from the Illinois Theatre Association.
