= Candida (play) =

Play by George Bernard Shaw

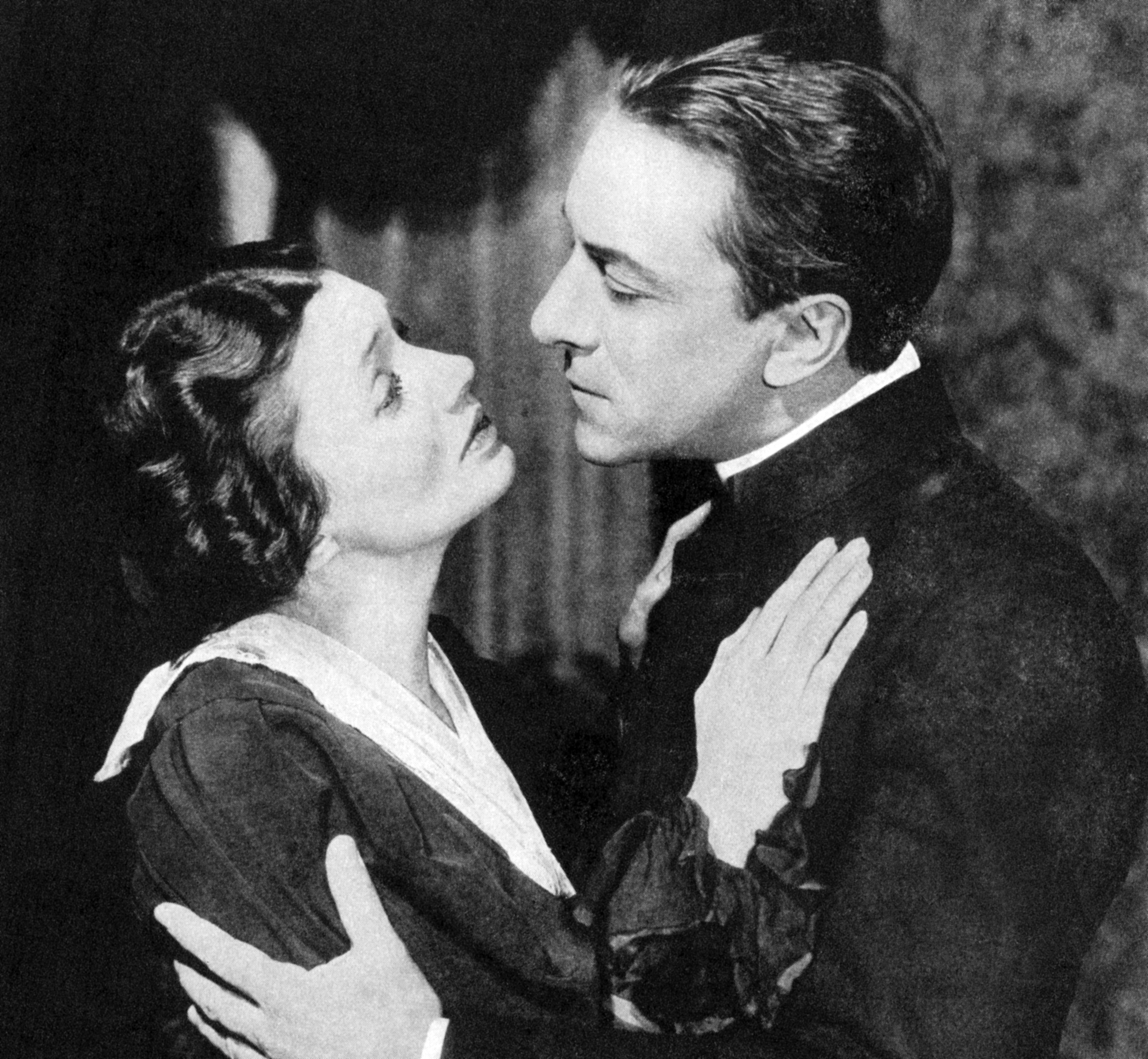
- Katharine Cornell and Pedro de Cordoba in the 1924 Broadway production of Candida
- Original language: English
- Written by: George Bernard Shaw
- Subject: The wife of a clergyman must choose between her husband and a man who idealises her
- Genre: comedy
- Setting: north-east London

Premiere
- Date: 30 March 1894
- Place: Theatre Royal, South Shields

Candida (Shavian: 𐑒𐑩𐑯𐑛𐑦𐑛𐑳), a comedy by playwright George Bernard Shaw, was written in 1894 and first published in 1898, as part of his Plays Pleasant. The central characters are clergyman James Morell, his wife Candida and a youthful poet, Eugene Marchbanks, who tries to win Candida's affections. The play questions Victorian notions of love and marriage, asking what a woman really desires from her husband. The cleric is a Christian Socialist, allowing Shaw (who was a Fabian Socialist) to weave political issues, current at the time, into the story.

Shaw attempted but failed to have a London production of the play put on in the 1890s, but there were two small provincial productions. However, in late 1903 actor Arnold Daly had such a great success with the play that Shaw would write by 1904 that New York was seeing "an outbreak of Candidamania". The Royal Court Theatre in London performed the play in six matinees in 1904. The same theatre staged several of Shaw's other plays from 1904 to 1907, including further revivals of Candida.

== Characters ==
In order of appearance

- Candida
- Miss Proserpine Garnett—Morell's secretary
- The Reverend James Mavor Morell—a clergyman and Candida's husband
- The Reverend Alexander (Lexy) Mill
- Mr Burgess
- Eugene Marchbanks

== Plot ==
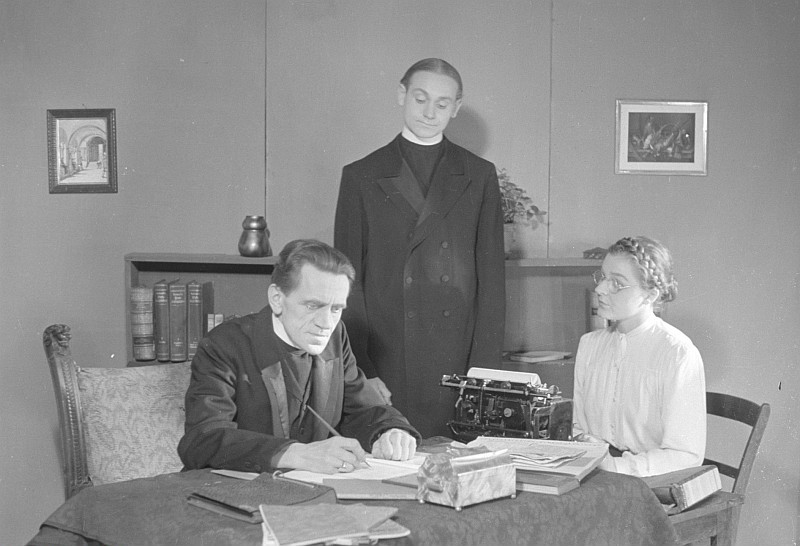
A scene from a production of the play in Berlin

The play is set in the northeast suburbs of London in the month of October. It tells the story of Candida, the wife of a famous clergyman, the Reverend James Mavor Morell. Morell is a Christian Socialist, popular in the Church of England, but Candida is responsible for much of his success. Candida returns home briefly from a trip to London with Eugene Marchbanks, a young poet who wants to rescue her from what he presumes to be her dull family life.

Marchbanks is in love with Candida and believes she deserves something more than just complacency from her husband. He considers her divine, and his love eternal. In his view, it is quite improper and humiliating for Candida to have to attend to petty household chores. Morell believes Candida needs his care and protection, but the truth is quite the contrary. Ultimately, Candida must choose between the two gentlemen. She reasserts her preference for the "weaker of the two" who, after a momentary uncertainty, turns out to be her husband Morell.

== Early productions and Candidamania ==
The play was first performed at the Theatre Royal, South Shields on 30 March 1895. It was revived by the Independent Theatre Company, at Her Majesty's Theatre, Aberdeen on 30 July 1897. It was first performed in London at the Stage Society, The Strand, on 1 July 1900. However, it was not until late 1903, when Arnold Daly mounted a production at the Princess Theatre in New York that the play became a success. Daly's production was quickly followed by one in London. The first public performance in London was on 26 April 1904, at the Royal Court.

The play was so popular in 1904 that the phenomenon was referred to as "Candidamania". In the words of The New York Sun,

A new complaint has become widespread. It may be described as 'Candidamania.' It is a contagious disease, frequently caught in street cars, elevated trains, department stores, restaurants, and other places where people talk about what they did the night before. 'Have you seen Candida?' is the question of the hour. Thousands are dragging their friends to see Mr. Shaw's play."

Shaw himself adopted the term, as have later writers. Shaw felt that the play was misinterpreted by some of its public. He wrote his short 1904 comedy How He Lied to Her Husband, in part as a kind of reply to Candida. The play depicts a farcical version of the same situation. Shaw's friend Archibald Henderson described it as "the reductio ad absurdum of the Candidamaniacs".

== Criticism and interpretation ==
In Bernard Shaw and the Aesthetes, Elsie Bonita Adams has given this assessment of Marchbanks, comparing him to two real-life artists:

Though Marchbanks has many of the external characteristics and some of the attitudes of the aesthete-artist such as Sholto Douglas or Adrian Herbert, he does not pay mere lip-service to art, his sensitivity is no pose, and he tries to rid himself of illusions.

Shaw himself describes Eugene's story-arc as a realization that Candida is not at all what he wants from life, that the kind of domestic love she could provide "is essentially the creature of limitations which are far transcended in his own nature". When Eugene departs into the night, it is not "the night of despair and darkness but the free air and holy starlight which is so much more natural an atmosphere to him than this stuffy fireside warmth of mothers and sisters and wives and so on". Eugene, according to Shaw, "is really a god going back to his heaven, proud, unspeakably contemptuous of the 'happiness' he envied in the days of his blindness, clearly seeing that he has higher business on hand than Candida". For her part, Candida is "very immoral" and completely misreads Eugene's transformation over the course of the play.

Andy Propst of Time Out listed Candida as the 25th greatest play of all time, arguing that it "bristles with Shavian wit and pointed political and social debate, ultimately shimmering as a shrewd consideration of love and marriage in Victorian England – or really any period."

== Later productions ==
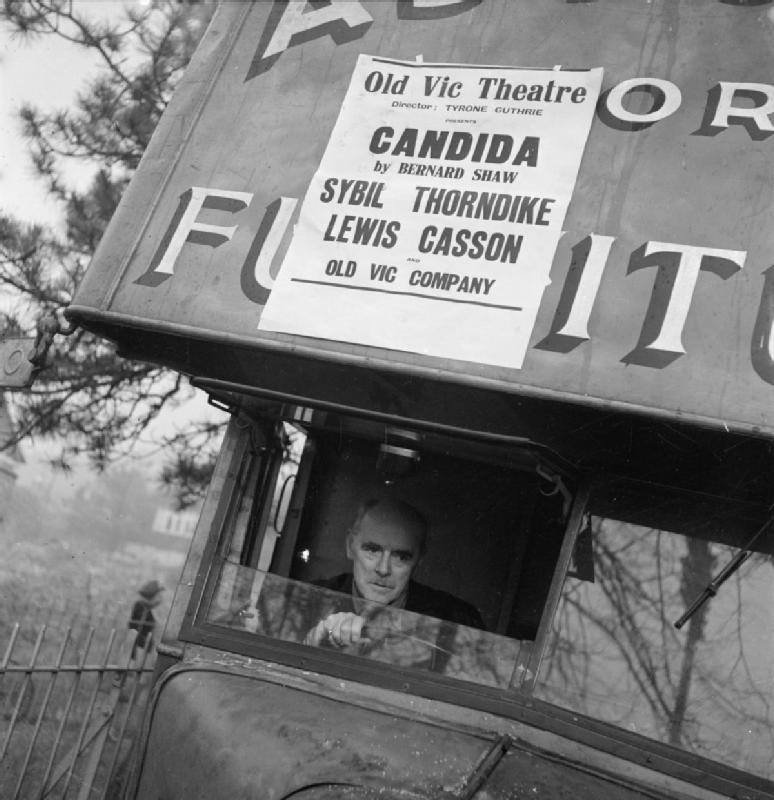
Actor Lewis Casson drives the Old Vic Travelling Theatre Company scenery van during the Old Vic tour of South Wales in 1941. The van is an old furniture removal van. A poster above the windscreen advertises the play they will be performing as Candida, starring Casson and Sybil Thorndike, and directed by Tyrone Guthrie.

Katharine Cornell played the lead role on Broadway in five different productions, the last four of which were for her own production company. She was the actress most closely associated with this role. Shaw stated that she had created "an ideal British Candida in my imagination" as she essentially re-envisioned the role of Candida, making her the central character in the play. Previously, Candida herself was not conceived by directors or actresses as important as the issues and themes that Shaw was trying to convey. The first time Cornell played the role in 1924, she was so acclaimed that Actors' Theatre, which controlled the production rights to the play in the United States, forbade any other actress from playing the role while Cornell was still alive. In her final production of 1946, a young Marlon Brando played the role of Marchbanks.

The BBC adaptation Candida into a 90 Minute TV play in 1961 for BBC Television. The play starred Wendy Craig as Candida, Patrick Allen as Rev. James Mavor Morrell, Peter McEnery as Eugene Marchbanks, Peter Sallis as Rev. Alexander Mill, Rosamund Greenwood as Miss Proserpine Garnett and Michael Brennan as Mr. Burgess.

A version for Australian television aired in 1962. Reviewing the adaptation, the Sydney Morning Herald was critical of the production style but praised the cast.

The Roundabout Theater Company presented a Broadway revival in 1993 with Mary Steenburgen, Robert Foxworth and Robert Sean Leonard.

A Court Theatre Company production starring JoBeth Williams and Tom Amandes was recorded by the L.A. Theatre Works.

In 2003 the Canadian Broadcasting Corporation broadcast a production of the play. An Oxford Stage Company production of Candida toured the UK in 2004, with Andrew Havill as Morell, Serena Evans as Candida, and Richard Glaves as Marchbanks.

In February 2009 BBC Radio 7 repeated a broadcast of a radio production of the play starring Hannah Gordon as Candida, Edward Petherbridge as Morell, and Christopher Guard as Eugene. It was first broadcast on BBC Radio 4 on 15 August 1977.

It was revived at the Theatre Royal, Bath in July 2013 with Charity Wakefield as Candida, Jamie Parker as Morell, Frank Dillane as Marchbanks and David Troughton as Mr Burgess, Candida's father.

In March/April 2015 at the Gatehouse Theatre in London, Judi Bowker played Candida with Harry Meacher as Morell, Sebastian Cornelius Marchbanks and Roger Sansom as Burgess.

== Musical adaptation ==
In 2009, Writers Theatre presented a musical adaptation of the play under the title A Minister's Wife, with music by Josh Schmidt; lyrics by Jan Tranen; book by Austin Pendleton; conceived and directed by Artistic Director Michael Halberstam. The production was critically acclaimed and in 2011, the Lincoln Center mounted a new production of the piece (also directed by Halberstam). The production featured Kate Fry as Candida; Bobby Steggert as Marchbanks; Marc Kudisch as Morell; Liz Baltes as Prossy; and Drew Gehling as Lexy. The production received outstanding notices in The New York Times and The Wall Street Journal. Charles Isherwood, writing in The New York Times, called it a "lovingly composed chamber musical" which "moves with a gentle step, keeping an intimate focus on its central characters."

An original cast recording from PS Classics was released on 30 August. The West Coast Premiere of the musical adaptation opened in June 2013 at The San Jose Repertory Theater directed by Michael Halberstam.
