= Call Me Red =

- Dexter: Resurrection episode
- Lowell (Neil Patrick Harris) at Dexter Morgan's (Michael C. Hall) table, with Dexter revealing to Lowell that he is the Bay Harbor Butcher
- Episode no.: Season 1 Episode 4
- Directed by: Monica Raymund
- Written by: Alexandra Franklin; Marc Muszynski
- Cinematography by: Radium Cheung
- Editing by: Gaston Jaren Lopez
- Original air date: July 25, 2025
- Running time: 67 minutes

Guest appearances
- Krysten Ritter as Mia (special guest star); Neil Patrick Harris as Lowell (special guest star); Eric Stonestreet as Al (special guest star); Peter Dinklage as Leon Prater; David Dastmalchian as Gareth; Darius Jordan Lee as Lance Thomas; JillMarie Lawrence as Constance Kamara; Reese Antoinette as Joy Kamara

Episode chronology
← Previous "Backseat Driver"	Next → "Murder Horny"

"Call Me Red" is the fourth episode of the American crime drama mystery television series Dexter: Resurrection, sequel to Dexter and Dexter: New Blood. The episode was written by Alexandra Franklin and Marc Muszynski, and directed by Monica Raymund. It was released on Paramount+ with Showtime on July 25, 2025, and aired on Showtime two days later.

The series is set following the events of Dexter: New Blood, and it follows Dexter Morgan, who has recovered from his near-fatal gunshot wound. After realizing that his son Harrison is now working as a hotel bellhop in New York City, he sets out to find him. During this, his old friend Angel Batista returns to talk with Dexter over unfinished business. In the episode, Dexter poses as Red to infiltrate a private meeting with other serial killers, while Angel arrives in New York City.

The episode was critically acclaimed. The guest stars, writing, character development, and ending were praised, and many critics considered it one of the best episodes of the franchise.

== Plot ==
Using Ronald Schmidt's camera-shy hoodie and donning his thumbprint for identification, Dexter Morgan, posing as Red, is picked up by a woman named Charley. She takes him to a mansion, where he meets the owner, Leon Prater, a billionaire venture capitalist fascinated by serial killers. He runs a secret society of them and has a hidden trophy room that features, among other things, Arthur Mitchell's hammer, Dexter's own blood slides (attributed to James Doakes), and Brian Moser's exsanguination table. To earn Prater's trust, Dexter supplies a trophy: the ID of Schmidt's first victim.

Dexter meets another killer, Mia LaPierre, known as Lady Vengeance, who kills sexual predators. Dexter wonders whether she, like him, has a code. More serial killers arrive: Al, a chipper family man known as Rapunzel; Lowell, an obnoxious and misogynistic man known as the Tattoo Collector; and Gareth, a quiet and reserved man known as the Gemini Killer. Prater invites them to dine and announces that Keith, the Canton Clubber, chose not to follow the rules and so was killed. During the dinner, Lowell presents how he operates, revealing that he has decided on a target; Dexter, upon hearing this, marks Lowell as his next victim.

Angel Batista arrives in New York City, tracing Dexter's truck to Harrison's friend Lance, who reveals that he bought it from Harrison. Angel meets Harrison at the Empire Hotel, detailing his history with Dexter. He asks Harrison to reveal any information he may know. Elsa sees the encounter and confronts Angel, telling him of Ryan's murder and how he was dumped. Intrigued, Angel visits the NYPD and asks to assist Claudette in her investigation, connecting aspects of Ryan's murder to those of the Bay Harbor Butcher. Harrison feels guilty and seeks comfort in Elsa, but storms off in embarrassment when she rejects a kiss.

After arranging a meeting with Lowell, Dexter goes jogging with Mia. She tells him the first person she ever killed was her mother's boyfriend who raped her younger sister. She invites him to her apartment, where she attempts to tease him into showering with her. However, Dexter is forced to leave to meet up with Lowell in order to stop him. To sedate him, Dexter uses his own weapon—an anesthesia mask—against him. Dexter takes Lowell to a tattoo parlor to kill him. The following day, Angel meets with Harrison, making it clear that he knows Dexter is the Bay Harbor Butcher. Harrison brushes it off, but continues feeling guilt. While Angel suspects Harrison of killing Ryan Foster, he chooses to keep it to himself out of sympathy. Harrison goes to an NYPD precinct to confess, but is stopped outside the entrance by Dexter.

== Production ==
=== Development ===
In May 2025, the episode's title was revealed to be "Call Me Red". The episode was written by supervising producers Alexandra Franklin and Marc Muszynski, and directed by producer Monica Raymund. This marked Franklin's first writing credit, Muszynski's first writing credit, and Raymund's second directing credit.

=== Casting ===
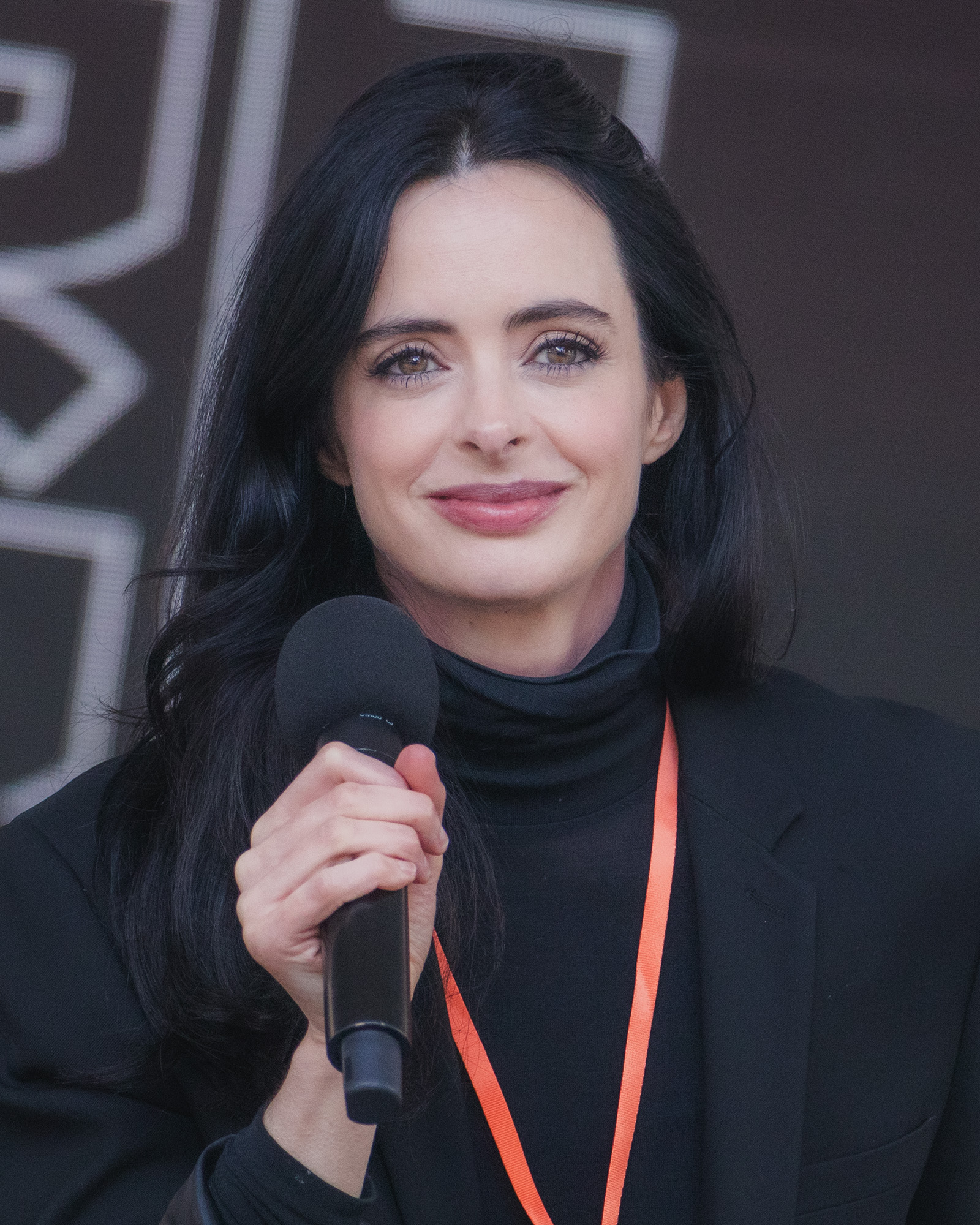
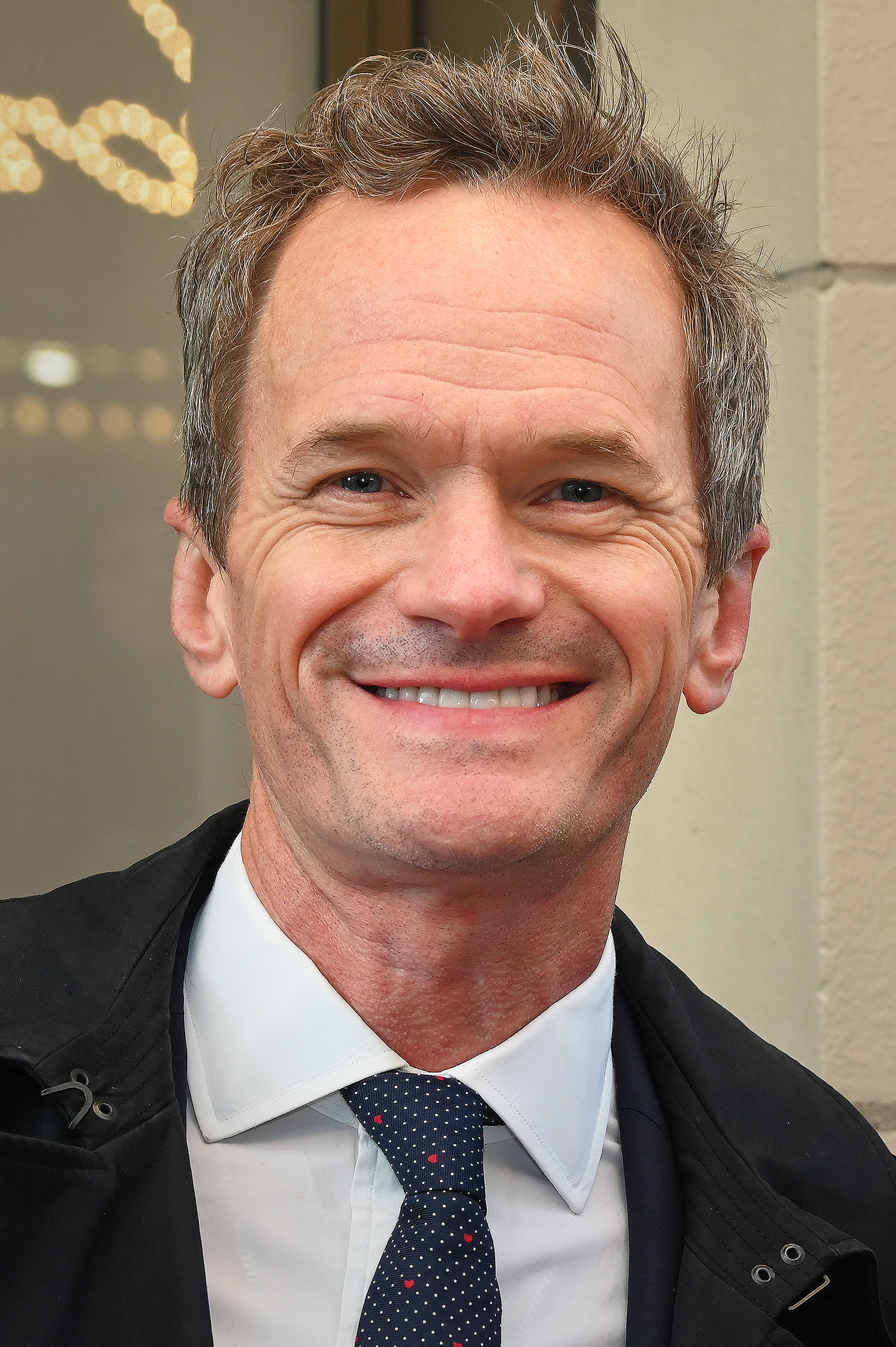
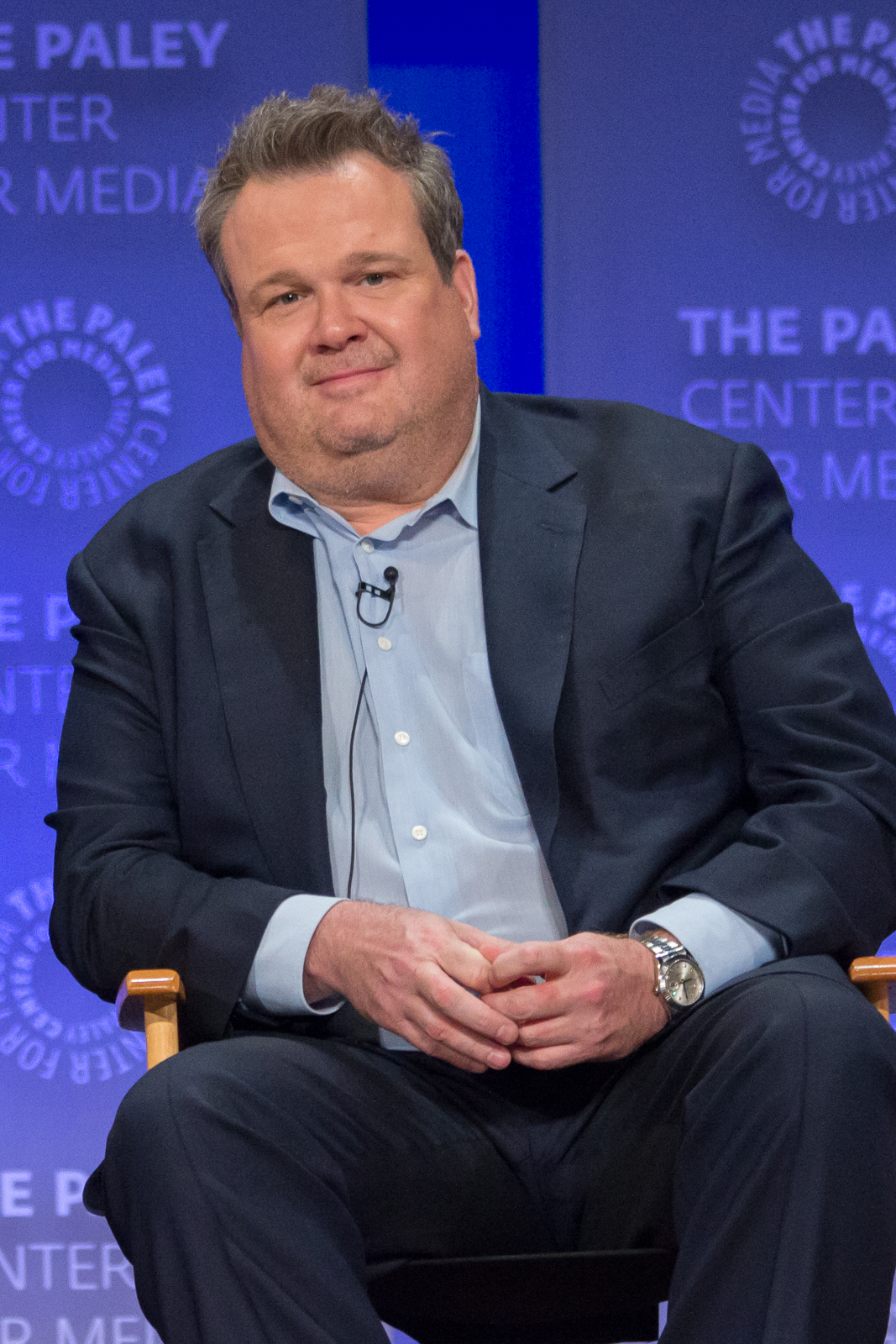
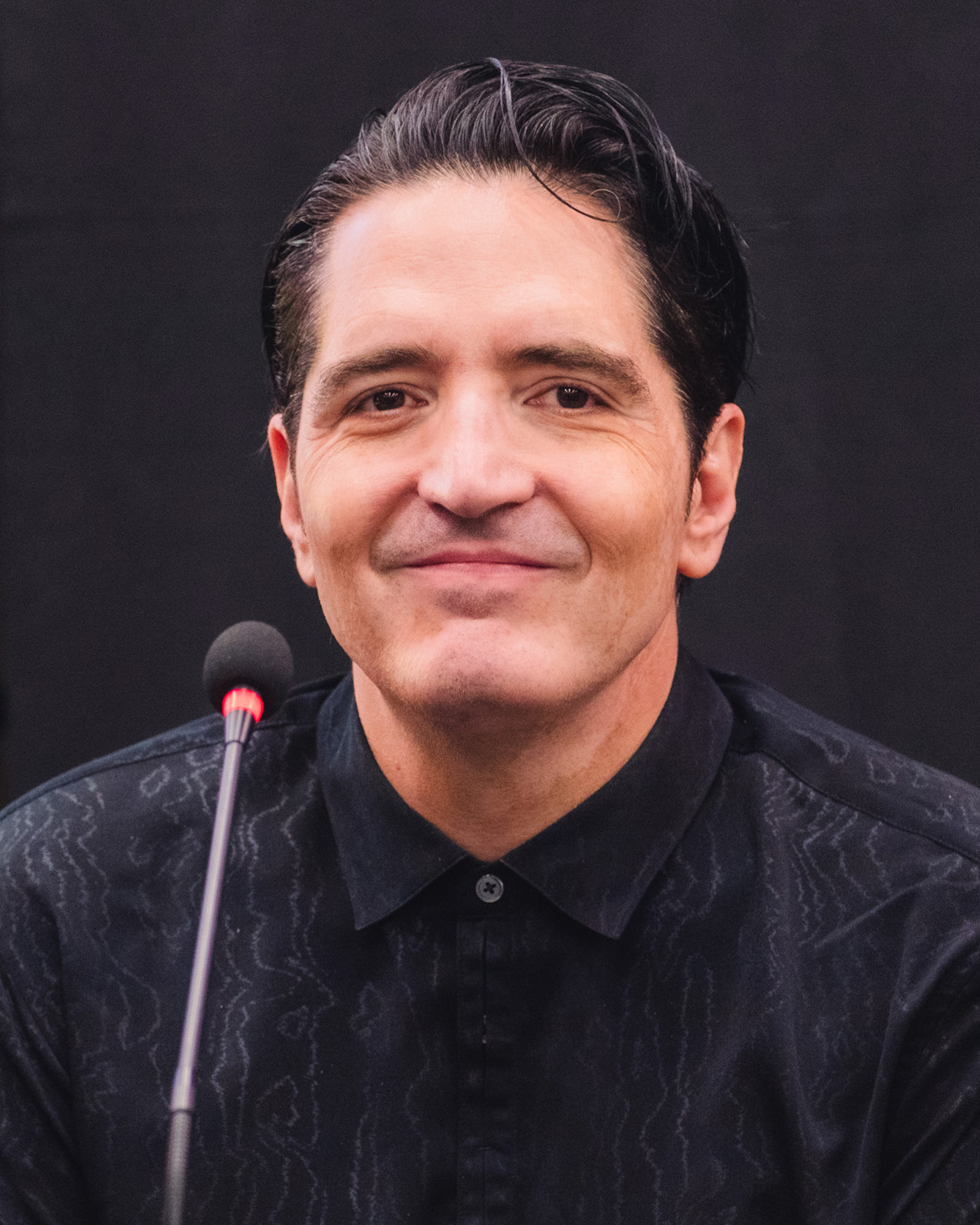
Krysten Ritter, Neil Patrick Harris, Eric Stonestreet, and David Dastmalchian guest star in the episode.

In February and March 2025, Krysten Ritter, Neil Patrick Harris, Eric Stonestreet and David Dastmalchian were announced to guest star in the series.

Harris had only watched the first season of Dexter, but when he was offered the role, he said, "I read it and I was so flattered and was like, “Yeah, let me live my Matthew McConaughey realness.”" Dastmalchian did not know at first that his character would be a serial killer, but he was intrigued to join the series, as he loved the original series. Stonestreet previously auditioned in the first season to play a victim of the Ice Truck Killer, but did not get the part. Stonestreet said, "I do represent to Dexter what he wishes he had. Obviously, we know that Trinity didn't have that, and we do believe that Al has that... which makes my character very, very unique in this world, that I can really compartmentalize those two things, which I think confuses everyone, and hopefully, it confuses the audience because the goal here is to put people at ease and put people in comfort, and then come from nowhere."

Hall was intrigued by the idea of Dexter bonding with other serial killers, "I think he's enticed by the idea that he can have some sense of camaraderie and intimacy with these like-minded individuals. On the other hand, they're all undeniably code-worthy and need to be taken out. So, what's he going to do? That's a part of the fun of it." Ritter also explained Mia's connection with Dexter, "She's incredulous of all of the serial killers and she wants to know more. I think she finds him attractive and that's the first way in. And Dexter thinks that she has a code, [so] they kind of hit it off."

== Reception ==
"Call Me Red" received critical acclaim. Louis Peitzman of Vulture gave the episode a perfect 5 star rating out of 5 and wrote, "After seasons of mediocrity, a notoriously terrible finale, several years off the air, a disappointing reboot, and a deeply mid prequel, Dexter finally delivered a top-tier hour of television again. Is “Call Me Red” a perfect episode? Not really. But Dexter: Resurrection has at last arrived at the serial-killer club we've been getting tantalizing teases of over the last three episodes, and the execution is worth the wait. This is the show at its best — dark, funny, impeccably cast. If I'm grading on a curve, that's because I never thought we'd have it this good again."

Shawn Van Horn of Collider gave the episode an 8 out of 10 rating and wrote, "Not giving up, Harrison heads straight to the police station, but before he can go in, the father he thinks is dead puts a hand on his shoulder and says, "Don't." Everything is about to radically shift on Dexter: Resurrection." Matthew Wilkinson of Game Rant wrote, "It was an episode that significantly advanced the storyline, not only with Harrison and Dexter's reunion, but also with how the new characters were introduced and the fresh dynamics that were showcased. There's a lot of potential for where this show can be taken now, and that's only going to increase the buzz that currently surrounds Dexter: Resurrection." Ashley Bissette Sumerel of Telltale TV gave the episode a 4.5 out of 5 star rating and wrote, "It makes me nervous for Batista's own fate, but let’s hope nothing bad happens to him. Having him on Dexter's trail after all this time is the perfect way to keep this story going, and the good news for Harrison, and probably for Dexter too, is that Dexter finally reveals himself to his son. Them working together might just be what they need."

Greg MacArthur of Screen Rant wrote, "If Dexter: Resurrection continues to be just as great as episode 4, it will undoubtedly cement itself as one of the all-time best seasons in franchise history." Carissa Pavlica of TV Fanatic gave the episode a 4.15 star rating out of 5 and wrote, "This was one hell of a long episode, but it set up the rest of Dexter: Resurrection Season 1."
