= All Creatures Here Below =

- Directed by: Collin Schiffli
- Written by: David Dastmalchian
- Produced by: Amy Greene; Nacho Arenas; Chris Stinson
- Starring: David Dastmalchian; Karen Gillan; David Koechner; Richard Cabral; John Doe; Jennifer Morrison
- Cinematography: Bongani Mlambo
- Edited by: Amanda Griffin
- Music by: Ceiri Torjussen
- Production companies: Bleiberg Entertainment; Planeo Films
- Distributed by: Samuel Goldwyn Films
- Release dates: October 18, 2018 (DTLAFF); May 17, 2019 (United States)
- Running time: 91 minutes
- Country: United States
- Language: English

All Creatures Here Below is a 2018 American drama film directed by Collin Schiffli and written by David Dastmalchian. The film is produced by Nacho Arenas, Amy Greene, and Chris Stinson under the banner of Planeo Films. The film stars Dastmalchian, Karen Gillan, David Koechner, John Doe, and Jennifer Morrison. The film premiered at the Downtown Los Angeles Film Festival on October 18, 2018, and was theatrically released by Samuel Goldwyn Films on May 17, 2019, in the United States.

== Plot ==
Gensan and Ruby are a young couple living hand to mouth in Los Angeles on Gensan’s job in fast food, while Ruby’s diminished mental capacity makes it difficult for her to hold a job. Ruby wants a child, but Gensan refuses to father one with her.

When his restaurant is permanently closed, Gensan gambles on a backyard cockfight, then murders the man who won’t make good on the bet. That same day, Ruby abducts a neighbor’s infant daughter, adding further complications when Gensan steals the dead man’s car and picks her up to flee Los Angeles. The three travel cross country, with Ruby, and more cautiously Gensan, bonding more with the baby, whom Ruby names Irene, though she lacks even the most basic knowledge of childcare.

They eventually reach Gensan and Ruby’s childhood home in De Soto, Kansas, revealing they are brother and sister. Their Uncle Doug tells Gensan their father, who subjected Gensan and Ruby to horrific abuse, died in prison, leaving nothing but an old shack to Gensan and Ruby. Doug convinces Gensan their only option is turning themselves in for the kidnapping, returning Irene to her mother, getting Ruby care in a facility of some type, and Gensan getting a short prison term, having come forward.

Gensan tells Doug he will retrieve Ruby and Irene and turn them in at Doug’s house. When Gensan returns to the motel where he, Ruby, and Irene are staying, he discovers Ruby has accidentally smothered Irene to death when trying to keep her quiet, believing the police were at the door. While Doug and the police are waiting, Gensan takes Ruby to a field where they played as children and kills her. As he finishes burying “mother and daughter” together, sirens are heard approaching.

== Cast ==
- David Dastmalchian as Gensan
- Karen Gillan as Ruby
- David Koechner as Robert
- Jennifer Morrison as Penny
- Richard Cabral as Hugo
- John Doe as Uncle Doug

== Reception ==
On the review aggregator Rotten Tomatoes, the film holds an approval rating of 71% based on 21 reviews, and an average rating of 6.8/10.

Dennis Harvey of Variety wrote, "Schiffli directs with a nice balance between momentum and naturalism. Yet the creditable handling can’t quite mask material that feels inorganically rooted in secondhand dramatic clichés." Jeannette Catsoulis of The New York Times wrote, "A movie about calamitous choices and the constraints that shape them, “Creatures” places its leads in one moral trap after another. Despite this, the actors miraculously keep us on their side — until, finally, they can’t." Katie Walsh of The Los Angeles Times wrote, "The story takes some unbelievably tragic twists and turns, and along the way, Dastmalchian unfolds a riveting performance, aided by Schiffli’s beautiful and unobtrusive style."
