= Animals (2014 film) =

2014 film by Collin Schiffli

- Film poster
- Directed by: Collin Schiffli
- Written by: David Dastmalchian
- Produced by: Mary Pat Bentel; Chris Smith
- Starring: David Dastmalchian; Kim Shaw; John Heard; John Hoogenakker
- Cinematography: Larkin Donley
- Edited by: Amanda Griffin
- Music by: Ian Hultquist
- Production company: Animals the Film LLC
- Distributed by: Oscilloscope
- Release date: March 9, 2014 (South by Southwest)
- Running time: 85 minutes
- Country: United States
- Language: English

Animals is a 2014 American romantic drama film directed by Collin Schiffli and written by David Dastmalchian. The film stars Dastmalchian and Kim Shaw as a couple living in a broken car who scam strangers to support their heroin addiction. When their misadventures turn from bad to worse, the young lovers must decide if true love can prevail in the face of all else.

== Plot ==
A college-educated, middle-class young man named Jude and his girlfriend Bobbie exist somewhere between homelessness and fantasy. Both struggle with and enable each other's heroin addiction, spending most of their time trying to score drugs. Sleeping in their dilapidated car or seedy Chicago motel rooms, they survive by shoplifting and committing low-level scams to scrounge up enough cash to stay one step ahead of their debilitating addiction. As the couple's plight becomes increasingly dire, they are ultimately forced to face the reality of their situation. Jude is involuntarily admitted into a mental hospital to detox, leaving Bobbie to fend for herself through her withdrawal symptoms.

Unable to see Jude, Bobbie starts sleeping in the parking lot of Jude's hospital. She is quickly discovered by hospital security guard Albert, who befriends her. Her initial plan is to wait for Jude to be released from the hospital so that they can be reunited, but Albert's earlier suggestion for Bobbie to call her mother for help eventually convinces her to do that instead. She makes arrangements to go back home, knowing she and Jude may be separated forever.

Jude is eventually about to be discharged, and the hospital finally allows Bobbie visitation. They embrace while Bobbie explains to Jude that her intention is to stay with her mother and intermittently drug-abusing stepfather (who is also a doctor) in Missouri, and that her mother directly stated that Jude cannot join them. Jude and Bobbie find themselves at a crossroads, and decide to part ways hoping to stay drug-free.

== Cast ==
- David Dastmalchian as Jude
- Kim Shaw as Bobbie
- John Heard as Albert
- John Hoogenakker as Guy
- Ilyssa Fradin as Brenda
- Anish Jethmalani as Dr. Ahmed
- John Lister IV as Norman
- Paul Perroni as Undercover Cop 1
- Simeon Henderson as Undercover Cop 2

== Reception ==
=== Critical response ===
On review aggregator Rotten Tomatoes, the film holds an approval rating of 85% based on 26 reviews, and an average rating of 7.03. The website's critical consensus reads, "Animals' drug-fueled storyline is undeniably grim, but its sensitive approach to its difficult themes -- and its talented cast -- make watching it well worth the discomfort." Metacritic, which uses a weighted average, assigned the film a score of 71 out of 100, based on 13 critics, indicating "generally favorable" reviews.

Joe Leydon of Variety wrote, "Dastmalchian and Shaw are thoroughly convincing both as vividly drawn, emotionally complex individuals, and as a couple inextricably bound by addiction and enabling. Among the well-cast supporting players, John Heard makes the most significant impact by making every second count in his brief role as a sympathetic security guard." Steve Dollar of The Wall Street Journal wrote, "Director Collin Schiffli keeps a tight focus on character, as the couple's plight becomes increasingly dire." Sheila O'Malley of RogerEbert.com wrote, "Such small moments (and there are many in the film) help make what is a typical story memorable and somewhat unique. It's not a particularly interesting relationship because drug addicts tend to be boring, but it is a pleasure to watch both of these actors work."

=== Accolades ===
Year	Award	Category	Result	Refs.
2014	Virginia Film Festival	Programmer's Choice Award	Won	
2014	South by Southwest	Special Jury Award	Won	
2014	South by Southwest	SXSW Grand Jury Award	Nominated	
