= David Dastmalchian =

American actor (born 1975)

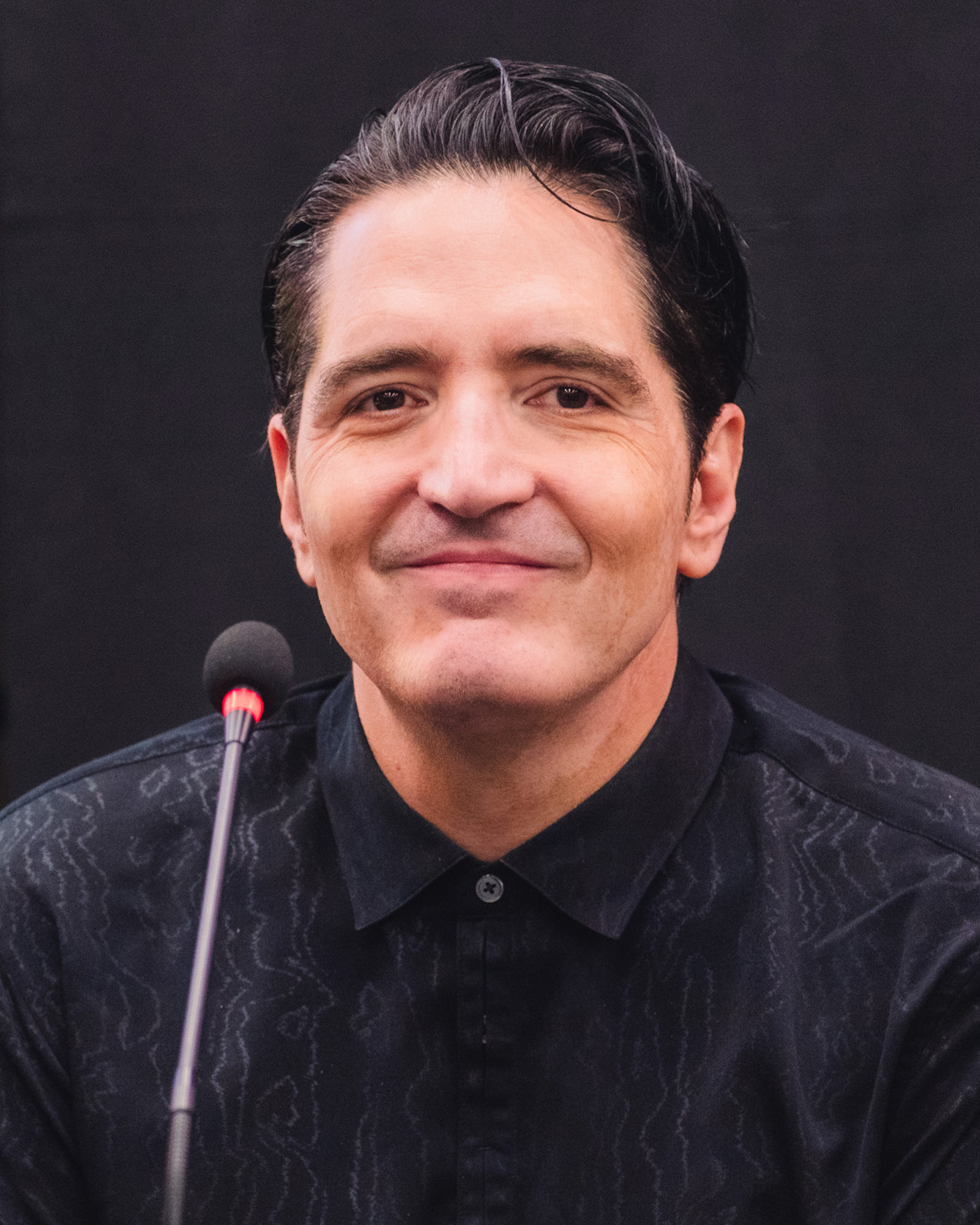
- Dastmalchian in 2026
- Born: July 21, 1975 (age 51); Allentown, Pennsylvania, U.S.
- Education: DePaul University (BFA)
- Occupations: Actor; writer; producer; comic book writer; podcast host
- Years active: 2002–present
- Spouse: Evelyn Leigh (m. 2014)
- Children: 2

David Dastmalchian (/dəstˈmɑːltʃən/ dəst-MAHL-chən; born July 21, 1975) is an American actor, writer, producer, and author known especially for his work in science fiction, superhero films and television series. He has had roles in three films directed by Denis Villeneuve: Prisoners (2013); Blade Runner 2049 (2017); and Dune (2021), in which he portrayed Piter De Vries. He stars as Gurathin in the Apple TV+ series Murderbot (2025), appears as Mr. 3 in the Netflix series One Piece (2026) and plays the villain M. Bison in Street Fighter (2026).

Dastmalchian has had supporting roles in numerous superhero films and series, including the feature films The Dark Knight (2008) in his first film role, Ant-Man (2015) and Ant-Man and the Wasp (2018) as Kurt, and The Suicide Squad (2021) as Polka-Dot Man, direct-to-video animated superhero films, and the television series Gotham (2017) and The Flash (2017–2021). He appeared again in a Christopher Nolan film in Oppenheimer (2023).

Although he is best known for his work as a character actor, Dastmalchian had leading roles in the 2014 semi-autobiographical film Animals, which he also wrote, and the 2023 horror film Late Night with the Devil.

== Early life ==
David Dastmalchian was born on July 21, 1975, in Allentown, Pennsylvania, to Priscilla and Hossein Dastmalchian (Sep 20, 1937 — Oct 11, 2021). His father was an Iranian-American engineer who worked at the engineering firm Black & Veatch while his mother was of Irish, English, Italian, and French descent. He has two sisters and a brother. His parents divorced, which he described as "tumultuous", and both later remarried. He was raised in Overland Park, Kansas, where he attended Shawnee Mission South High School from which he graduated in 1994, having been part of the drama club. He described growing up in the Kansas City metropolitan area as "very traditional in one sense, and a conservative community that also had a rad, fringe, artistic, progressive tribe of people who were finding connectivity through the arts and the culture of KC and the surrounding suburbs."

In his childhood, Dastmalchian developed vitiligo, for which he suffered ridicule from his peers. Consequently, he experienced depression throughout his childhood. Growing up, he enjoyed football, theater, and comics. He would mow lawns, saving money to buy comics. He studied at The Theatre School at DePaul University and graduated in 1999. Prior to beginning his career as an actor, he dealt with a heroin addiction for five years. He wrote about his experiences in his screenplay, Animals, and continues to advocate for mental health and substance abuse treatment programs. Shortly after becoming sober, he worked at a seafood restaurant in Kansas City. He was also briefly a fisherman in Alaska.

== Career ==
=== 2008–2014: Early film and television work ===
Dastmalchian began his professional career in the mid-2000s in Chicago, working on stage and in commercials. He has received acclaim for lead roles in Tennessee Williams's The Glass Menagerie and Sam Shepard's Buried Child at Chicago's Shattered Globe Theatre. He was involved with a number of Chicago theater companies and was an artistic associate at Caffeine Theatre.

His feature film debut came in the late 2000s, as the Joker's deranged henchman, Thomas Schiff, in Christopher Nolan's The Dark Knight. His portrayal of Bob Taylor in Denis Villeneuve's Prisoners received strong reviews. Richard Corliss of Time called Dastmalchian's performance "excellent – chatty, modest with some subtle telltale psychopathy" and The Guardian's Paul MacInnes likened his introduction as a new suspect to Kevin Spacey's entrance in Seven.

In March 2014, Dastmalchian was awarded the Special Jury Prize for Courage in Storytelling at the South by Southwest Film Festival. He wrote and starred in the feature film Animals, directed by Collin Schiffli. Ashley Moreno of The Austin Chronicle credits Dastmalchian's screenplay with "present[ing] an authenticity often lacking in films about drug abuse." Film Threat's Brian Tallerico similarly sings the praises of Dastmalchian's breakout performance, noting his ability to "capture that sense of self-loathing that comes through in the body language of an addict without overselling it".

Other feature film appearances include starring roles in the psychological thriller The Employer, the indie grindhouse hit Sushi Girl, the drama Cass (winner, San Diego Black Film Festival), Girls Will Be Girls 2012 (a sequel to the 2003 cult hit Girls Will Be Girls), Saving Lincoln, and Virgin Alexander.

He has also appeared on television: as Simon on the Fox sci-fi series Almost Human, in the episode "Simon Says"; as a chess expert and murder suspect on the CBS forensics procedural drama series CSI: Crime Scene Investigation; and as Oz Turner on the BBC drama series Intruders.

Other television appearances include the FX sitcom The League, the Showtime crime drama series Ray Donovan, and NBC's medical drama ER. He portrayed DC Comics villain Abra Kadabra in seasons 3 and 7 of The Flash.

=== 2015–2022: Ant-Man, The Suicide Squad, and Dune ===
In 2015 Dastmalchian appeared in Ant-Man as Kurt and in Michel Franco's Chronic.

He continued to appear in television: in an eleven-episode arc as Murdoc, the nemesis of the title character in MacGyver; and as Dwight Pollard in the second season of the TV series Gotham.

In 2017, Dastmalchian had a small role in Blade Runner 2049, also directed by Denis Villeneuve. The same year, he also appeared in Twin Peaks: The Return as Pit Boss Warrick. The following year, Dastmalchian once again portrayed Kurt in Ant-Man and the Wasp, the sequel to Ant-Man. In 2021, he portrayed Polka-Dot Man in The Suicide Squad, a character with whom he said he connected on a personal level due to the childhood bullying he suffered as a result of his vitiligo. Later that same year, he appeared in his third collaboration with Villeneuve when he portrayed Piter De Vries in Dune.

=== 2023–present: Late Night with the Devil, Murderbot, and One Piece ===
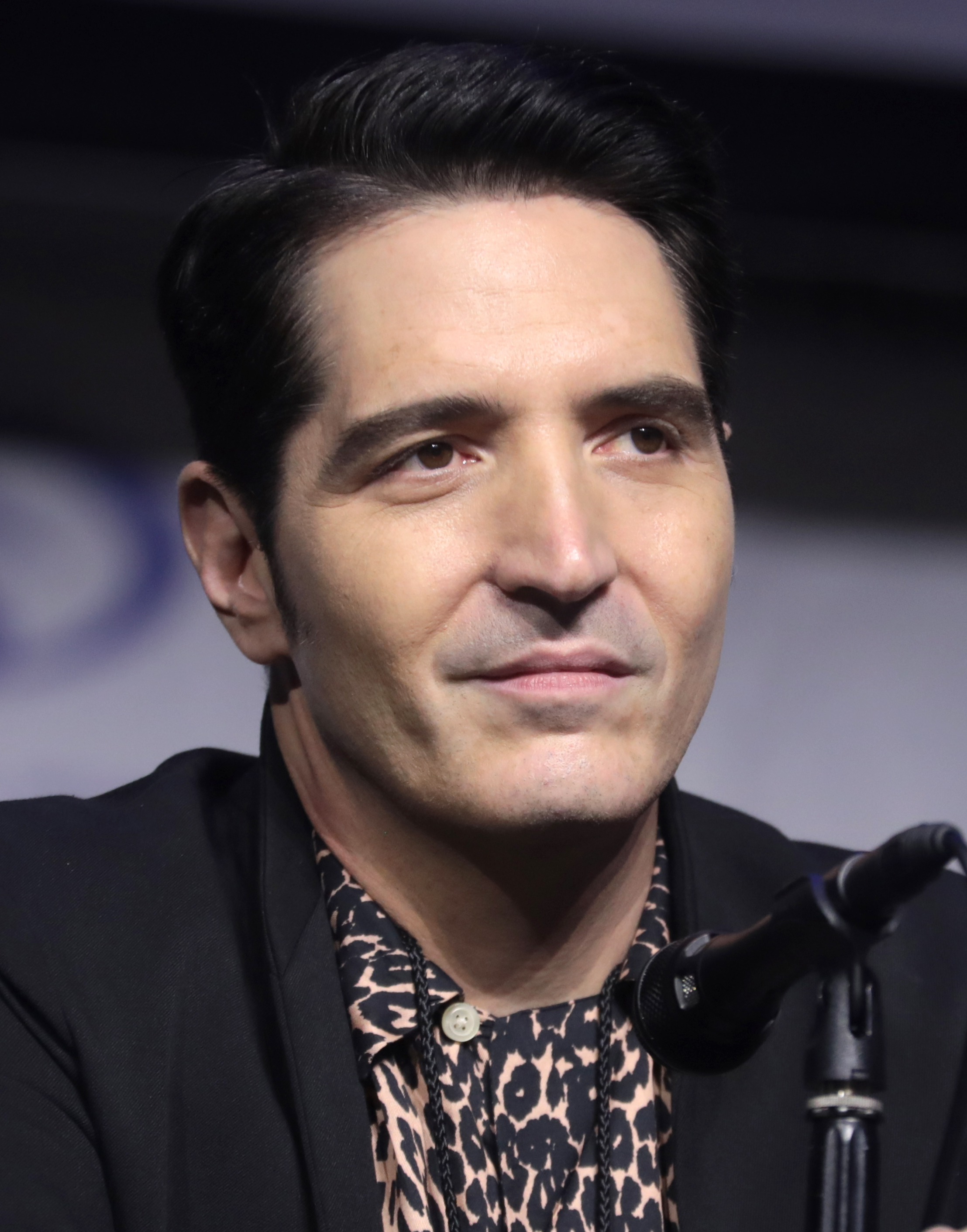
Dastmalchian in 2023

In 2023, Dastmalchian starred in the horror films Late Night with the Devil and The Boogeyman, as well as The Last Voyage of the Demeter. Also in 2023, he had a minor role as William L. Borden in Christopher Nolan's biopic epic Oppenheimer. On March 13, 2025, it was revealed that Dastmalchian had been cast in the upcoming Dexter series sequel Dexter: Resurrection by Showtime coming later that summer in a guest starring role as Gareth.

In 2025 he played Gurathin, one of the main characters in the Apple TV+ series Murderbot. He also appeared in the Bryan Fuller film Dust Bunny.

In October of that year, Dastmalchian expressed an interest in playing Morbius the Living Vampire in the Marvel Cinematic Universe. In the same interview, he stated that he would like to play either Solomon Grundy or Dr. Jonathan Crane in the DCU.

In 2026, he appeared as Mr. 3 in the second season of the Netflix series One Piece, a live-action adaptation of the anime series of the same name; he was introduced to the franchise by his son through the original manga and had watched the live-action series before being approached for the role. Later that year, Dastmalchian portrayed M. Bison in the 2026 film adaptation of the Street Fighter video game series.

=== Other work ===
In addition to his acting career, Dastmalchian is a comic book writer. In 2019, he debuted his Dark Horse Comics series Count Crowley, illustrated by Lukas Ketner. He made his video game voice acting debut with the VR game Batman: Arkham Shadow, where he voiced Vic Sage / The Question. Since April 2024, he has also hosted the talk show Grave Conversations, where he and other celebrities lie in caskets while discussing topics of morality and death.

== Personal life ==
Dastmalchian married artist Evelyn Leigh in 2014. They live in Los Angeles with their two children, a son and daughter.

== Graphic novels ==
Dastmalchian has written multiple graphic novels for different publishing houses including:

Darkhorse Comics:

- Count Crowley
  - Volume 1: Reluctant Midnight Monster Hunter (2020)
  - Criminal Macabre/Count Crowley: From the Pit They Came (2022)
  - Volume 2: Amateur Midnight Monster Hunter (2023)
  - Volume 3: Mediocre Midnight Monster Hunter (2024)
- Headless Horseman Halloween Annual (2023)
- Headless Horseman Halloween Annual (2024)
- Kingdom of Earth (2026)

Image Comics:

- Knights Vs. Samurai (2024)

DC Comics:

- DC Horror Presents... (2024-) #1
- DC Horror Presents: Creature Commandos (2025)

Marvel Comics:

- Web of Venomverse: Fresh Brains (2025) #1
- Venom: Black, White, & Blood (2025) #3

Monstrous Books:

- Kolchak Meets the Classic Monsters #1: Kolchak Meets the Werewolf and Count Crowley

Z2 Comics:

- David Dastmalchian's Through (2026)

Panick Entertainment:

- The Accessories (2026)

== Filmography ==
=== Film ===
Key
†	Denotes films that have not yet been released

Year	Title	Role	Notes	Ref(s)
2008	The Dark Knight	Thomas Schiff		
2009	Horsemen	Terrence		
2012	1,000 Times More Brutal	Antonio Scarafini	Also known as Brutal	
2012	Sushi Girl	Nelson		
2013	Cass	Joshua Whitmore	Winner, San Diego Black Film Festival	
2013	Saving Lincoln	Major Eckert		
2013	The Employer	James Harris		
2013	Prisoners	Bob Taylor		
2014	Animals	Jude	Also writer and producer SXSW Film Festival – Special Jury Prize Winner	
2014	Angry Video Game Nerd: The Movie	Sergeant L. J. Ng		
2015	Chronic	Bernard		
2015	Ant-Man	Kurt		
2017	The Belko Experiment	Lonny		
2017	Blade Runner 2049	Coco		
2018	Ant-Man and the Wasp	Kurt		
2018	Bird Box	Whistling Marauder		
2018	A Million Little Pieces	Roy		
2018	The Domestics	Willy Cunningham		
2018	Relaxer	Cam		
2018	All Creatures Here Below	Gensan	Also writer	
2019	Madness in the Method	The Witness		
2019	Jay and Silent Bob Reboot	SWAT officer	Cameo	
2019	Teacher	James Lewis		
2021	Batman: The Long Halloween, Part One	Julian Day / Calendar Man	Voice role; Direct-to-DVD	
2021	The Suicide Squad	Abner Krill / Polka-Dot Man		
2021	Batman: The Long Halloween, Part Two	Julian Day / Calendar Man; Oswald Cobblepot / Penguin	Voice role; Direct-to-DVD	
2021	Dune	Piter De Vries		
2022	Weird: The Al Yankovic Story	John Deacon	Cameo	
2023	Ant-Man and the Wasp: Quantumania	Veb		
2023	Late Night with the Devil	Jack Delroy	Also executive producer	
2023	Boston Strangler	Albert DeSalvo		
2023	The Boogeyman	Lester Billings		
2023	Oppenheimer	William L. Borden		
2023	The Last Voyage of the Demeter	Wojchek		
2023	Justice League x RWBY: Super Heroes & Huntsmen, Part Two	The Flash / Barry Allen	Voice role; Direct-to-DVD	
2023	Batman: The Doom That Came to Gotham	Grendon	Voice role; Direct-to-DVD	
2024	Afraid	Lightning		
2024	The Life of Chuck	Grieving Father		
2025	Rosario	Joe		
2025	Dust Bunny	Conspicuously Inconspicuous Man		
2026	Sender	Charlie		
2026	The Cure	Jeff Braun		
2026	Batman: Knightfall	Edward Nygma / The Riddler	Voice role; Direct-to-DVD	
2026	Street Fighter	M. Bison		
2027	The Shepherd †		Post-production; also executive producer	
2027	Kodak Super XX †		Post-production	

=== Television ===
Year	Title	Role	Notes
2008	ER	Young Man	Episode: "Heal Thyself"
2012	The League	Morgue Worker	Episode: "Judge MacArthur"
2013	Ray Donovan	English Teacher	Episode: "Black Cadillac"
2014	CSI: Crime Scene Investigation	Lee Crosby	Episode: "Killer Moves"
2014	Almost Human	Simon	Episode: "Simon Says"
2014	Intruders	Oz Turner	Episode: "She Was Provisional"
2015	CSI: Cyber	Logan Reeves	Episode: "Family Secrets"
2016	12 Monkeys	Kyle Slade	2 episodes
2016–21	MacGyver	Murdoc	11 episodes
2017	Gotham	Dwight Pollard	2 episodes, "Ghosts" and "Smile Like You Mean It"
2017	Twin Peaks	Pit Boss Warrick	3 episodes
2017	Svengoolie	Himself	2 episodes
2017, 2021	The Flash	Phillipe / Abra Kadabra	2 episodes
2019	Reprisal	Johnson	Main role, 9 episodes
2021	What If...?	Kurt (voice)	Episode: "What If... Zombies?!"
2022	The Boulet Brothers' Dragula: Titans	Himself	Guest judge, episode: "Science-Fiction (Horror) Double Feature"
2023	Miracle Workers	Ugulus Sleeze	Episode: "H.O.A"
2023	The Boulet Brothers' Dragula	Himself	Guest judge, episode: "Pleasure Planet X"
2024	The Rookie	Ray Watkins	Episodes: "The Vow" and "Secrets and Lies"
2025	Dexter: Resurrection	Gareth Pike / The Gemini Killer	Guest Star, 3 episodes: "Call Me Red", "Cats and Mouse", & "Course Correction"
2025	Murderbot	Gurathin	10 episodes
2025	The Boulet Brothers' Dragula: Titans	Himself	Guest judge, episode: "Halloween House Party, Part II"
2025	The Creep Tapes	Joseph	Guest Star, 1 episode: "Joseph"
2026	One Piece	Mr. 3	2 episodes

=== Video game ===
Year	Title	Role	Notes	Ref(s)
2024	Batman: Arkham Shadow	Vic Sage		

=== Music videos ===
Year	Title	Role	Artist
2012	"Constant Conversations"		Passion Pit
2015	"Everyone's Summer of '95"		Iron & Wine
2018	"Catch It"		Iceage
2018	"Dark Speed"		Failure
2018	"GALAKTIKON: Nightmare"	Triton	Brendon Small
2019	"Steve Jobs"		Xia Xia Technique
2020	"Obsession"		Puddles Pity Party
2020	"Sword and Shield"		Ken Andrews

=== Theatre ===
Year	Title	Role	Company	Notes
1999–2000	To Live As Variously As Possible	Larry Rivers	TimeLine Theatre	Chicago production
2005	Salome		The Side Project Theatre	Chicago production
2007	Bach at Leipzig	Johann Martin Steindorff, Georg Lenck (u/s)	Writers' Theatre	Chicago production
2007	Othello	Montano	Writers' Theatre	Chicago production
2007	Suddenly, Last Summer	George Holly	Shattered Globe Theatre	Chicago production
2008	As You Like It	Le Beau	Writers' Theatre	Chicago production
2008	The Glass Menagerie	Tom Wingfield	Shattered Globe Theatre	Chicago production
2009	Buried Child	Vince	Shattered Globe Theatre	Chicago production
2010	Hamlet, Prince of Puddles	Claudius	Bootleg Theater	Los Angeles production
