= Michael W. Halberstam =

American stage actor and director

Michael Halberstam is an American stage actor and director. He co-founded the Writers Theatre in Glencoe, Illinois, and served as its artistic director until 2021. He resigned after years of reported harassment and abuse from artists working at the theater.

== Early career ==
Halberstam attended University of Illinois, where he had been granted admission to the actor training program. Shortly after graduation in 1986 he moved to Chicago where he was immediately drawn to classics, working almost exclusively on the works of William Shakespeare. He went on to join The Stratford Festival's Young Company in Ontario and spent two years performing in a number of plays including Timon of Athens, The Knight of the Burning Pestle (title role), Much Ado About Nothing, As You Like It, and Macbeth.

== Writers Theatre ==
In 1992, Halberstam (Artistic Director) and Marilyn Campbell (Artistic Associate) founded Writers Theatre.

Writers Theatre has offered more than 100 productions, including 23 world premieres. The company has been recognized with 118 Joseph Jefferson Award nominations, including four nods for Best Production; nine Joseph Jefferson Awards and 12 After Dark Awards, as well as numerous citations to Halberstam for excellence and contributions to the field.

At Writers Theatre, Halberstam has directed Private Lives, Look Back in Anger, Candida, Fallen Angels, The Father, Rough Crossing, Crime and Punishment, Benefactors, The Doctor's Dilemma, The Seagull, The Duchess of Malfi, Othello, Rosencrantz and Guildenstern Are Dead, She Loves Me, The Real Thing, Hamlet, Sweet Charity, Days Like Today, Isaac's Eye, and Arcadia. Michael has also co-directed Death of a Streetcar Named Virginia Woolf: A Parody with Stuart Carden and Julius Caesar with Scott Parkinson. He also appeared as an actor in the Writers Theatre productions of Richard II, Misalliance, and Into the Woods. Cast members of Into the Woods published an open letter on social media describing Halberstam's inappropriate offstage behavior, stating, "We couldn't feel safe backstage, we couldn't feel safe in the dressing rooms, we couldn't feel safe with our friends at the bar in the lobby -- where could we feel safe?"

Writers Theatre has no human resources department. During his tenure, Halberstam used this to his advantage, often joking about calling HR after he said or did something inappropriate, knowing that his victim had no recourse. In their statement announcing his resignation, Writers Theatre acknowledged a history of "complaints about Halberstam's workplace comments and conduct."

== Reports of harassment, abuse, and subsequent resignation ==
In 2017, Michael Halberstam was accused on Twitter of sexually harassing an assistant director at Writers Theatre in 2003. An HR lawyer was hired by the board of directors who in turn hired an independent consultant to investigate the claims. As a result of the investigation the board reported that Halberstam "has made inappropriate and insensitive comments in the workplace but the investigation did not support a finding of other inappropriate sexual behavior" and recommended compliance training for Halberstam.

During the investigation, he maintained his position of power, continuing to direct the theater's mainstage production of The Importance of Being Earnest. Halberstam insisted that the cast "consented" to him staying in leadership, despite abusing his position of power to coerce said consent. Industry publication PerformInk reported, "from off-hand sexual comments to egregious propositions, the environment at Writers is one that is often described as sexually-charged, led by the otherwise well-respected co-founder of the 25-year-old company."

While he maintained the Artistic Director position after the initial investigation, Halberstam resigned from the theater in 2021 after continued reports of harassment and abuse.

== A Minister's Wife ==
In 2005 Halberstam asked composer Joshua Schmidt to compose incidental music for a production of George Bernard Shaw's Candida he was directing at the time. Halberstam was inspired by Schmidt's compositions to commission a full musical adaptation of the play. The composer was soon joined by lyricist Jan Tranen and bookwriter Austin Pendleton, who both subtly added to and reworked Shaw's immaculately conceived text. A Minister's Wife was the result of all four individuals' collaboration and premiered at Writers Theatre in May 2009 under Halberstam's direction and designed by Brian Sidney Bembridge.

Following its success at Writers Theatre, the new musical was brought to New York City, where Halberstam once again directed the show as part of Lincoln Center Theater's 2010/11 Season and San Jose Repertory Theatre's 2012/13 season.

== Opera ==
He has directed the operas Francesca da Ramini with the Chicago Symphony Orchestra, The Rape of Lucretia with the Chicago Opera Theater, and Le Freyschutz in its North American premiere at the Ravinia Festival.

== Recognition ==
He has received awards from The Chicago Drama League, The Arts & Business Council, and the Chicago Lawyers for the Creative Arts. He received the 2010 Zelda Fichandler Award from the Stage Directors and Choreographers Society, which recognizes an outstanding director or choreographer who is transforming the regional arts landscape through singular creativity and artistry in theatre. In 2013 he received the Artistic Achievement Award from the League of Chicago Theatres and was named "Chicagoan of the Year" for Theater by the Chicago Tribune. In 2016 he received an Award of Honor from the Illinois Theatre Association.

He has also shown support and recognition for Brando Crawford of Acting for a Cause.
