= Kim Shaw =

American actress

- Occupation: Actress
- Years active: 2006–present

Kim Shaw is an American actress. She is best known as Dr. Cassie Williams on Saving Hope (2015–2017).

== Career ==
Her first lead role was in 2007 when she starred opposite Paul Sorvino in the independent film Greetings from the Shore. She has been in two films with Sarah Jessica Parker: Sex and the City (2008) and Did You Hear About the Morgans? (2009). Recurring characters on TV include Amber Madison on The Good Wife, Tina Bradley on MTV's comedy series I Just Want My Pants Back and Dr. Cassie Williams in Canada's number one drama, CTV's Saving Hope.

At the 9th Canadian Screen Awards in 2021, Shaw won the award for Best Lead Performance in a Television Movie for her performance in the film The Lead.

== Filmography ==
=== Film ===
Year	Title	Role	Notes
2007	Greetings from the Shore	Jenny Chambers	
2007	The Babysitters	Ali Towne	
2008	Sex and the City	Valentine's Night Waitress	
2009	Did You Hear About the Morgans?	Nurse Kelly	
2010	She's Out of My League	Katie	
2013	Snake and Mongoose	Judy McEwen	
2014	Animals	Bobbie	
2016	Christine	Andrea Kirby	
2016	Nobody Walks in L.A.	Becca	
2018	Rent-an-Elf	Ava	
2021	As Gouda as it Gets	Brie Belanger	"As Gouda As It Gets - Rotten Tomatoes". Rotten Tomatoes.

=== Television ===
Year	Title	Role	Notes
2006	The Gamekillers	The Mother Hen	TV movie
2006	Law & Order	Nicole Flynn	Episode: "Release"
2007	Gossip Girl	Amanda	Episode: "Dare Devil"
2009	Important Things with Demetri Martin	Kathy; T.G.I.F. Waitress	Episode: "Power"; Episode: "Brains"
2009	Cupid	Pop Star	Episode: "Left of the Dial"
2009	White Collar	Julianna Laszlo	Episode: "The Portrait"
2009	The Good Wife	Amber Madison	3 episodes
2010	Glory Daze	Tammy	2 episodes: "What's Love Got to Nude With It"; "Some Like It Hot Tub"
2011	Blackout	Beth Andrews	3 episodes
2011	I Just Want My Pants Back	Tina	13 episodes
2012	How I Met Your Mother	Julie	Episode: "Nannies"
2012	Audrey	Audrey	Web TV series, WIGS
2013	Anger Management	Vanessa	Episode: "Charlie Does it for Science"
2013	Two and a Half Men	Maria	Episode: "Some Kind of Lesbian Zombie"
2014	NCIS	Former Navy Lieutenant Courtney Reed	Episode: "Kill the Messenger"
2015-2017	Saving Hope	Dr. Cassie Williams	(seasons 4 & 5)
2017	Chicago P.D.	Sarah Jaines-Huntley	Episode: "Little Bit of Light"
2018	Blue Bloods	Clara Hayes	Episode: "Mind Games"
2019	Christmas Scavenger Hunt	Belinda	Hallmark Channel movie
2020	Christmas on the Menu	Josie Jennings	Lifetime Movie
2021	You	Nurse Fiona	5 episodes
2024	Chicago Fire	Alicia	Episode: "The Little Things"
2025	Good American Family	Jennifer	Recurring
