= Crime and Punishment (play) =

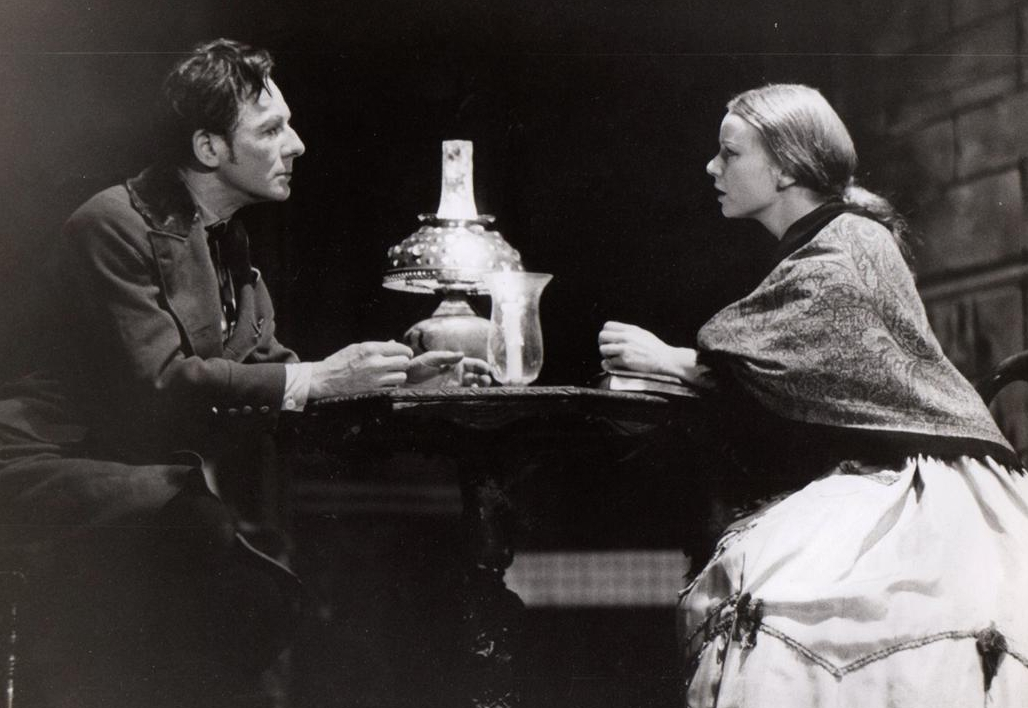
John Gielgud and Dolly Haas in the 1947 Broadway production of Crime and Punishment

Crime and Punishment is a stage adaptation of Fyodor Dostoevsky's classic 1866 novel Crime and Punishment. The authors, Marilyn Campbell and Curt Columbus, created a 90-minute, three-person play, with each character playing multiple roles.

The play was performed at 59E59 St Theater with Writers' Theatre in 2007 in New York City. The New York Times, in its positive review of the play, rhetorically asked, "Who would have thought that the novel no high school student has ever finished reading would make such engrossing theater?" before promising that the Campbell and Columbus' stage adaptation would "banish any bad memories you might have of trying to struggle through Dostoyevsky's book." The show received positive reviews in The Washington Post, The (Cleveland) Plain Dealer and The Seattle Times, as well.

The play was performed by the Arden Theatre Company in Philadelphia in 2006 and the Round House Theatre in Bethesda, Md., in 2007. In 2009, it was staged by Seattle's Intiman Theatre, the Cleveland Play House, and the Berkeley Repertory Theatre, and by the Kentucky Repertory Theatre in November 2010. It will be performed by the Boulder Ensemble Theatre Company in early 2011.

Campbell previously wrote My Own Stranger, which was adapted from the works of poet Anne Sexton, The Beats, which featured the material of beat poets including Allen Ginsberg (played by David Cromer), and The Gospel According to Mark Twain.

The play won Chicago's 2003 Joseph Jefferson Award, Best New Adaptation.
