= Curt Columbus =

Curt Columbus became Trinity Repertory Company’s fifth artistic director in January 2006. He is also the artistic director of the Brown/Trinity MFA programs in Acting and Directing. His directing credits for Trinity include Macbeth, Ragtime, Beowulf: A Thousand Years of Baggage, Middletown, Vanya and Sonia and Masha and Spike, The Merchant of Venice, His Girl Friday, Camelot, Cabaret, Blithe Spirit, A Christmas Carol, Cherry Orchard and the world premieres of Stephen Thorne's The Completely Fictional, Utterly True, Final Strange Tale of Edgar Allan Poe and Jackie Sibblies Drury's Social Creatures. Trinity has been home to the world premieres of three of his plays, Paris by Night, The Dreams of Antigone, and Sparrow Grass. Trinity has also produced his translations of Chekhov’s Cherry Orchard and Ivanov, as well as Feydeau’s A Flea in Her Ear and Lope de Vega’s Like Sheep to Water (Fuente Ovejuna).

Prior to becoming the Artistic Director of Trinity Rep, Curt lived and worked as an actor, director, adaptor and playwright in the Chicago theater scene for almost twenty years. His directing credits there include The House of Lily, Division Street: America, A Dybbuk, Macbeth, Our Town, A Midsummer Night's Dream, Earth and Sky, The Death of Zukasky and many, many more. He was artistic associate of Victory Gardens Theater from 1989–1994, the director of the University of Chicago’s University Theater from 1994–2000, and the associate artistic director of Chicago’s Steppenwolf Theater Company from 2000–2005, where he premiered his translations of Chekhov's Uncle Vanya and Cherry Orchard.

Curt’s adaptation of Dostoevsky’s Crime and Punishment (with Marilyn Campbell) has won awards and accolades at theaters around the United States, the United Kingdom and Australia. His translation of Chekhov’s Three Sisters was developed at the Arden Theatre in Philadelphia. It is now published by Dramatists Play Service, along with his translations of Chekhov’s other major plays, Seagull, Uncle Vanya, Cherry Orchard, and Ivanov, as is his translation of de Vega’s Furente Ovejuna. DPS also publishes his original play, Sparrow Grass.

Curt was awarded the 2019 Kennedy Center Medallion for his work co-creating the LORT/Kennedy Center ASPIRE Leadership Fellows Program for future theatre leaders of color as part of the American College Theater Festival. He lives in Providence, Rhode Island with his husband, Nate Watson.
