= Final girl =

Trope in slasher horror films

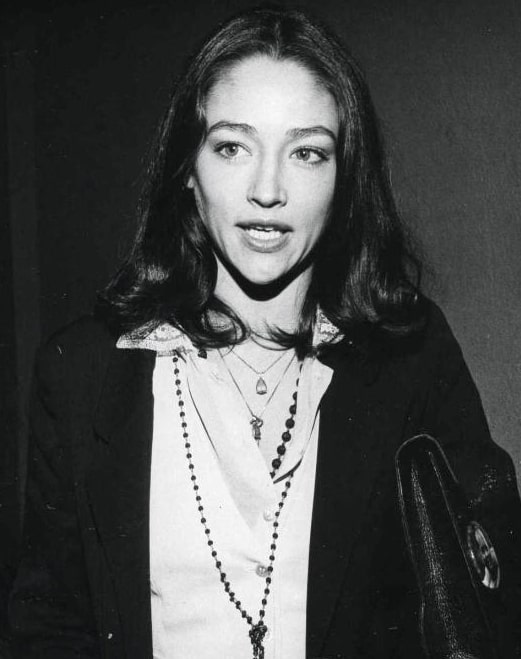
Olivia Hussey portrayed Jess Bradford in Black Christmas (1974), an early example of the final girl.

The final girl or survivor girl is a trope in horror films (particularly slasher films). It refers to the last surviving female character to confront the killer, ostensibly the one left to tell the story. The final girl has been observed in many films, notable examples being Voices of Desire, The Texas Chain Saw Massacre, Halloween, Alien, Friday the 13th, A Nightmare on Elm Street, and Scream. The term "final girl" was coined by Carol J. Clover in her article "Her Body, Himself: Gender in the Slasher Film" (1987). Clover suggested that in these films, the viewer began by sharing the perspective of the killer, but experienced a shift in identification to the final girl partway through the film.

== Usage of the term ==
The original meaning of "final girl", as first described by Clover in 1987 and further developed in her 1992 book, Men, Women, and Chain Saws, is quite narrow. Clover studied slasher films from the 1970s and 1980s (which is considered the golden age of the genre) and defined the final girl as a woman who is the sole survivor of the group of people (usually youths) who are chased by a villain and who gets a final confrontation with the villain (whether she kills them herself or she is saved at the last minute by someone else, such as a police officer), and who has such a "privilege" because of her implied moral superiority (for example, she is the only one who refuses sex, drugs, or other such behaviors, unlike her friends).

== Trope concept ==
A common plot line in many horror films is one in which several victims are killed one-by-one by a killer amid increasing terror, culminating in a climax in which the last surviving member of the group, usually female, either vanquishes the killer or escapes.

The final girl trope has evolved throughout the years, from early final girls most often being damsels in distress, often saved by a strong male (such as a police officer or heroic stranger), to more modern final girls who are more likely to survive due to their own abilities. According to Clover's definition, Lila Crane from Psycho (1960) is an example of a female survivor and not a final girl, due to her lack of moral purity, who is saved by a male, Sam Loomis, at the film's ending. Laurie Strode from Halloween (1978) is a final girl, but one that is saved by someone else (also named Sam Loomis).

On this basis, Tony Williams argues that, while 1980s horror film heroines were more progressive than those of earlier decades, the gender change is done conservatively, and the final-girl convention cannot be regarded as a progressive one "without more thorough investigation." Furthermore, in many slashers, the final girl's victory is often ambiguous or only apparent. The fact that she is still alive at the end of the movie does not make her a victorious heroine. In many of these movies, the end is ambiguous, where the killer/entity is or might be still alive, leaving viewers uncertain about the future of the final girl (a notable example being Jess Bradford in 1974's Black Christmas). The viewers wait for a send-off or sequel bait, and are felt that they are left with an apparent victory. Tony Williams also gives several examples of final girls in the heroines of the Friday the 13th series, such as Chris Higgins from Part III. He notes that she does not conclude the film wholly victorious and is catatonic at the end of the film. Williams also observes that Friday the 13th: The Final Chapter does not have a final girl, despite Trish Jarvis surviving at the end. Additionally, Williams notes that final girls often survive, but in the sequel they are either killed or institutionalized. A notable example is Alice Hardy, who survives Friday the 13th (1980) only to be killed in the beginning of Friday the 13th Part 2 (1981). Derek Soles argues that the tragic destiny of such final girls represents an expression of patriarchal society where capable, independent women must either be contained or destroyed. In more recent films, this has started to change, with the final girl no longer being always doomed, a notable example being the Scream series.

According to Clover, the final girl in many movies shares common characteristics: she is typically sexually unavailable or virginal and avoids the vices of the victims, like illegal drug use. She sometimes has a unisex name such as Avery, Chris, or Sidney. Occasionally the final girl will have a shared history with the killer. The final girl is the "investigating consciousness" of the film, moving the narrative forward, and as such, she exhibits intelligence, curiosity, and vigilance. Another trope of slashers (particularly in the 1980s) is "death by sex", where sex scenes are shortly followed by violence, with the participants being murdered in gruesome ways. More recent horror movies and series challenge more of these tropes. Buffy Summers in Buffy the Vampire Slayer, in the words of Jes Battis, "subverts" the final girl trope of B-grade horror films. Jason Middleton observes that although Buffy fulfills the monster-killing role of the final girl, she is the opposite of Clover's description of a final girl in many ways. Buffy is a cheerleader, a "beautiful blond" with a feminine first name, and "gets to have sex with boys and still kill the monster".

One of the basic premises of Clover's theory is that the capacity for audiences to identify with characters is unstable and fluid across gender lines, particularly in the case of slasher films. Clover argues that, during the final girl's confrontation with the killer, she becomes masculinized through "phallic appropriation" by taking up a weapon such as a knife or chainsaw against the killer. She also argues that, in order for a film to be successful, it is necessary for the surviving character to be female because she must experience abject terror, and many viewers would reject a film that showed abject terror on the part of a male; the terror has a purpose in that, if a female character survives, she is "purged" of undesirable characteristics such as the tendency to relentlessly pursue personal pleasure.

== Video games ==
The "final girl" trope has also been a trope in video games, appropriately within the survival horror genre. Characters within the genre often exhibit traits and experience scenarios associated with the trope, including isolation, vulnerability, and the need to survive and confront a hostile threat. Some of these characters include, but are not limited to: Ellie Williams in The Last of Us, Grace Ashcroft in Resident Evil: Requiem, and Heather Mason in Silent Hill 3.

However, the interactive elements of games often alter how the trope functions compared to film. Rather than audiences identifying with a survivor, players directly control the character, making survival feel dependent on player ability. Gameplay mechanics such as resource management, stealth, and combat add complexity and intensity to this premise. Some games also allow for multiple possible survivors or outcomes depending on player choice - complicating the idea of a single "final girl." A clear example of this is Until Dawn, where any of the main characters can survive or die depending on player decisions; while Sam Giddings is often framed as the "final girl" due to her strong survival skills and the fact that she is quite difficult to kill, the game's branching narrative means she can still die or end the story alongside other survivors. Emily Davis, meanwhile, is also given moments of plot armor, to the point that both characters can feel like they share aspects of the "final girl" role. This blurs the idea of a single predetermined survivor, even though the game's structure is able to bring across much of the feel of films in the same genre due to its heavy use of cutscenes and largely story driven gameplay progression.

== Notable characters ==
=== 1970s ===
==== Diane Adams ====
One pioneering example of the "final girl" trope occurs in Silent Night, Bloody Night (1972), whose main protagonist and narrator Diane Adams, portrayed by Mary Woronov, has been cited by multiple commentators as displaying the characteristics of a "final girl," with Rosie Knight of WomenWriteAboutComics even positing that she is arguably the first example of this character type. Conversely, in her own review of the film, Rebecca McCallum of Attack from Planet B contends that the film "follows the then more typical presentation of the hysterical woman or submissive mistress as opposed to the final girl trope which would be cemented in Sally Hardesty of Tobe Hooper's The Texas Chainsaw Massacre."

==== Jess Bradford ====
Another early example of a "final girl" can be found in the film Black Christmas (1974), where Jess Bradford, played by Olivia Hussey, is a well-developed character who refuses to back down against a series of more or less lethal male antagonists.

==== Sally Hardesty ====
Sally Hardesty from The Texas Chain Saw Massacre (1974), created by Tobe Hooper and portrayed by Marilyn Burns, has been regarded as one of the earliest examples of the final girl trope.

==== Laurie Strode ====
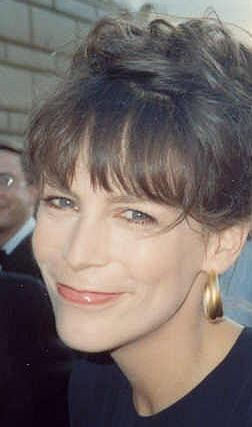
Jamie Lee Curtis, who portrayed Laurie Strode in seven movies in the Halloween franchise.

According to Clover, Laurie Strode (from Halloween (1978), Halloween II (1981), Halloween H20: 20 Years Later, Halloween: Resurrection, Halloween (2018), Halloween Kills and Halloween Ends) is another example of a final girl. Tony Williams notes that Clover's image of supposedly progressive final girls are never entirely victorious at the culmination of a film nor do they manage to eschew the male order of things as Clover argues. He holds up Strode as an example of this. She is rescued by a male character, Dr. Samuel Loomis, in the ending of Halloween (1981).

==== Ellen Ripley ====
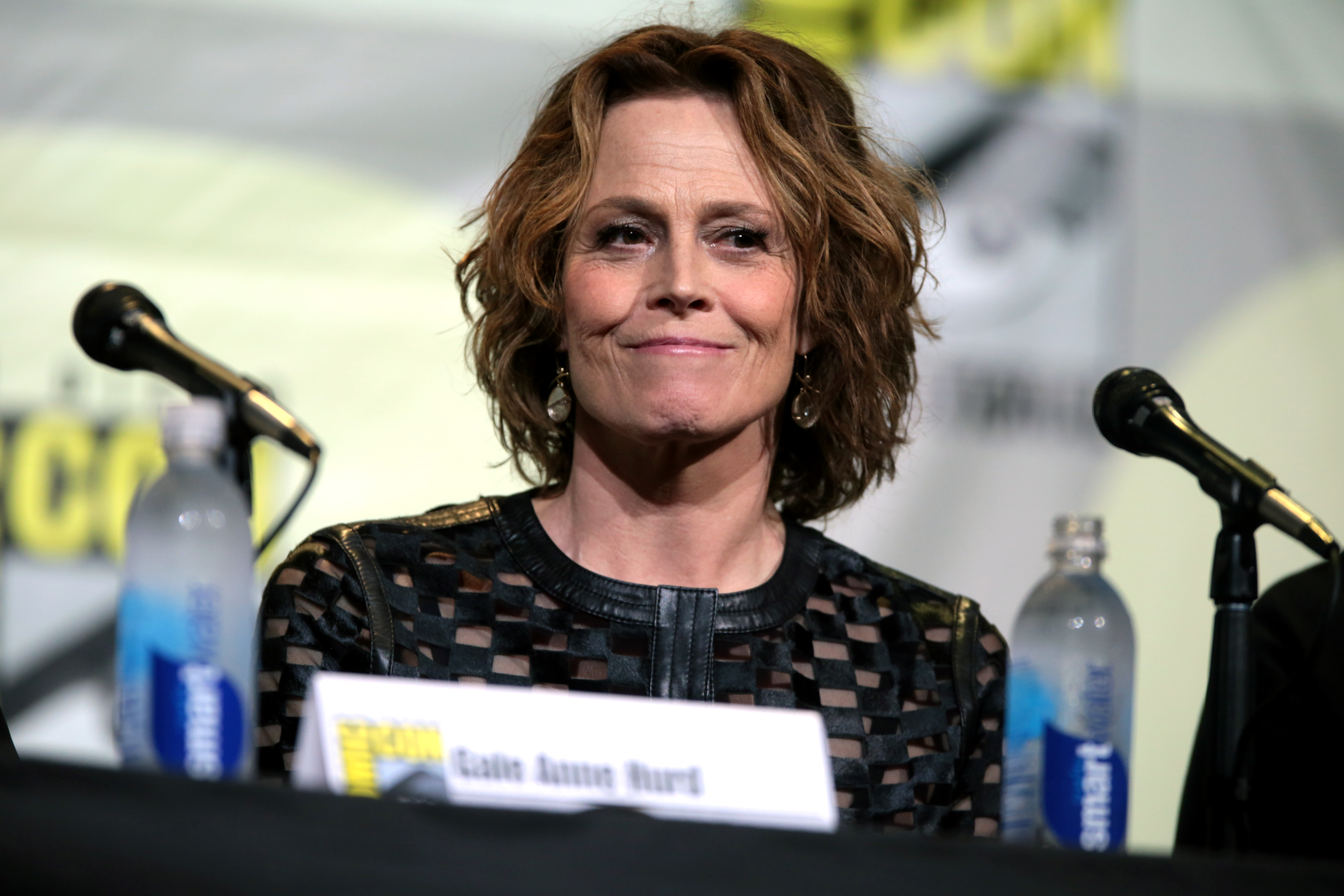
Sigourney Weaver, who portrayed Ellen Ripley.

Before the release of Alien 3, Clover identified Ellen Ripley from the Alien franchise as a final girl. Elizabeth Ezra continues this analysis for Alien Resurrection, arguing that by definition both Ripley and Annalee Call must be final girls, and that Call is the "next generation of Clover's Final Girl". In Ezra's view, Call exhibits traits that fit Clover's definition of a final girl, namely that she is boyish, having a short masculine-style haircut, and that she is characterized by (in Clover's words) "smartness, gravity, competence in mechanical and other practical matters, and sexual reluctance" being a ship's mechanic who rejects the sexual advances made by male characters on the ship. However, Ezra notes that Call fits the description imperfectly as she is a gynoid, not a human being.

Christine Cornea disputes the idea that Ripley is a final girl, contrasting Clover's analysis of the character with that of Barbara Creed, who presents Ripley as "the reassuring face of womanhood". Cornea does not accept either Clover's or Creed's views on Ripley. While she accepts Clover's general thesis of the final girl convention, she argues that Ripley does not follow the conventions of the slasher film, as Alien follows the different conventions of the science fiction film genre. In particular, there is no foregrounding in Alien, as there is in the slasher film genre, of the character's sexual purity and abstinence relative to the other characters (who would be, in accordance with the final girl convention, killed by the film's monster "because" of this). The science fiction genre that Alien inhabits, according to Cornea, simply lacks this kind of sexual theme in the first place, as it has no place in such "traditional" science fiction formats. Additionally, professor Brenda M. Boyle argues that in Alien Resurrection, Ripley has crossed the line between human and monster. This conflict of identity could further jeopardize her status as a final girl beyond Alien 3.

==== Sue Snell ====
In Brian De Palma's 1976 film based on Stephen King's 1974 novel, Carrie, Sue Snell (played by Amy Irving) is the sole survivor of Carrie White's telekinetic outburst of destruction at a high school prom. However, Sue dies in The Rage: Carrie 2. Carrie's half sister Rachel kills her.

=== 1980s ===
==== Ginny Field ====
The character Ginny Field (from Friday the 13th Part 2) has often been viewed as an example of the trope. In The Dread of Difference: Gender and the Horror Film, Barry Keith Grant stated that, "Ginny temporarily adopts Mrs. Voorhees's authoritarian role to survive. Although circumstances necessitate this, she clearly uses her enemy's strategy to become a phallic mother herself. This posture really questions the positive image of the Final Girl." He then called her "not victorious" when she called out for her boyfriend at the end of the film saying that it was done in a "non-independent manner". John Kenneth Muir references Ginny in Horror Films of the 1980s, Volume 1, saying "Amy Steel is introduced as Ginny, our final girl and heroine, and the only person who seems to have an inkling of the nearby danger. She's more resourceful than Alice and nearly upstages even Laurie Strode during the film's tense finale, wherein she brazenly dresses up as Jason's dead mother and starts barking orders at the confused serial killer." In Blood Money: A History of the First Teen Slasher Film Cycle, Richard Nowell said "The shift in characterization of the female leads was also trumpeted during Ginny's self-confident entrance (Amy Steel) in Friday the 13th Part II. Where the makers of its predecessor introduced Alice as she prepared cabins while dressed in denim jeans and a shapeless lumberjack shirt, the sequel's conventionally attractive lead is established immediately as combining masculine traits with feminine attributes. Ginny exits a battered VW bug in a flowing fuchsia skirt and a low-cut t-shirt." Ginny's adoption of the monster's own strategy, in Part II, brings into question whether the final girl image is in fact a wholly positive one.

==== Nancy Thompson ====
The character Nancy Thompson (from A Nightmare on Elm Street and A Nightmare on Elm Street 3: Dream Warriors) has often been regarded as one of the most influential horror movie heroines. In his book Horror films of the 1980s, John Kenneth Muir references Nancy Thompson.

=== 1990s ===
==== Sidney Prescott ====
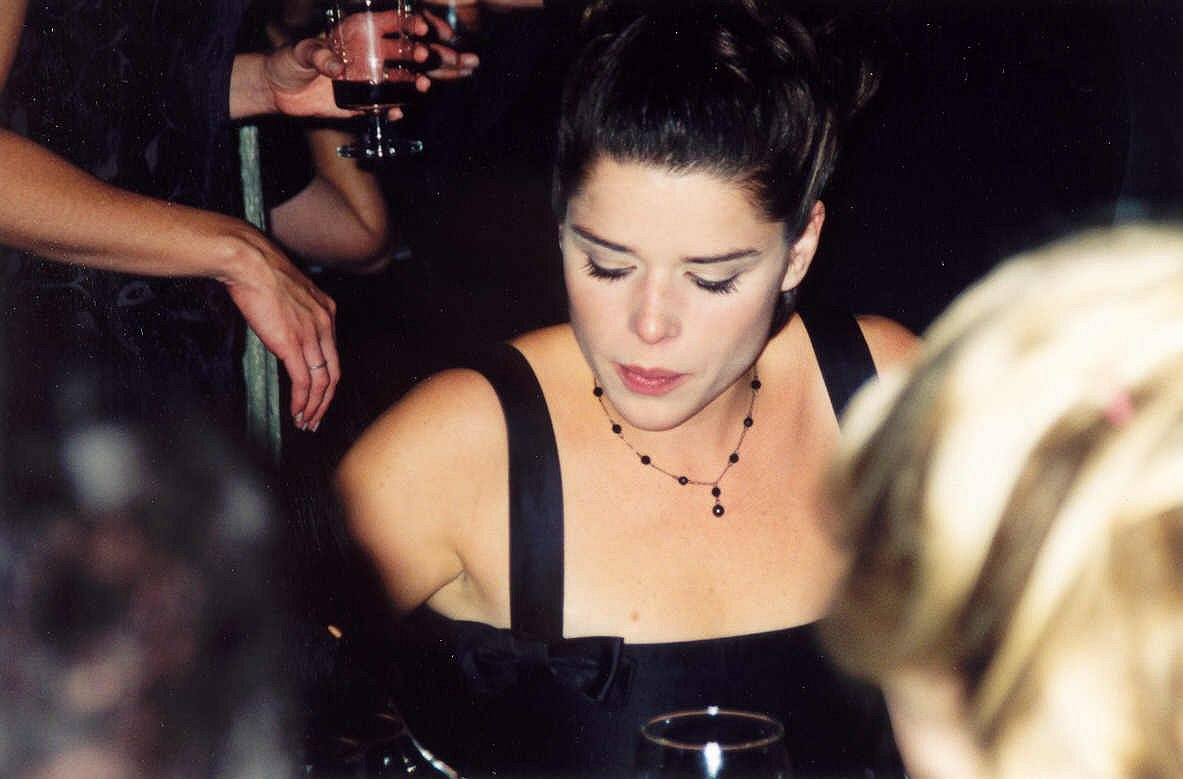
Neve Campbell, who portrayed Sidney Prescott.

The character Sidney Prescott (from the Scream films) is widely recognized as one of the most iconic and popular horror film heroines. Ana Horvat describes Sidney Prescott as "embodying the most important characteristics of the Final Girl".

==== Gale Weathers ====
The character of Gale Weathers (also from the Scream films) is recognized as "one of the most seminal character arcs in horror movie history". Often cited as a foil to protagonist Sidney Prescott, her character development over the course of the series has led many critics to acknowledge her as a prominent final girl as well.

==== Julie James ====
In the Kevin Williamson 1997 slasher film based on Lois Duncan’s 1973 novel, I Know What You Did Last Summer, Julie James (played by Jennifer Love Hewitt) is the only main female character to survive a vengeful killer.

=== 2010s ===
==== Dana Polk ====
Characters in the 2011 horror film The Cabin in the Woods explicitly discuss Dana's role as the final girl after a zombie attack on her and her friends. As part of a human sacrifice ritual that mirrors various horror film traditions and requires the deaths of five slasher movie archetypes: "the whore," "the athlete," "the scholar," "the fool," and "the virgin," the equivalent of the final girl who can die last or survive.

==== Mia Allen ====
From the 2013 horror remake Evil Dead, Mia starts off as a troubled addict, goes through withdrawal, literally goes to Hell and back, loses her brother and friends and turns into a final girl. Also, the fact that the Abomination appears as an evil double of Mia could be seen as a metaphor for Mia overcoming her drug addiction and gaining control. She faces her inner demon both literally and figuratively and conquers it.

==== Victoria Heyes ====
Heyes from the 2016 slasher film Terrifier has been observed by some critics to be a darker depiction of the "final girl" archetype. Having been driven insane by the events in the film, Heyes becomes a killer herself. An analysis by Brendan D. describes Victoria as a reflection of Art—"Our most recent final girl is Victoria from Terrifier, and what makes her so unique is her post-final girl status. Most final girls appear in the sequel or following situation as a capable guide for the next group of cannon fodder to demonstrate the villain's return. Instead, the trauma corrupts Victoria; she becomes monstrous like Art, with a disfigured appearance; and the brutality of a live-show death when a talk-show host mocked her. She is not a heroine but a dark reflection of the atrocities Art the Clown committed, fit for ridicule and loathing."

==== Tree Gelbman ====
John Squires of Bloody Disgusting described Happy Death Day's Tree Gelbman as a modern example of the trope and contrasts her to Friday the 13th's Alice Hardy.

=== 2020s ===
==== Maxine Minx ====
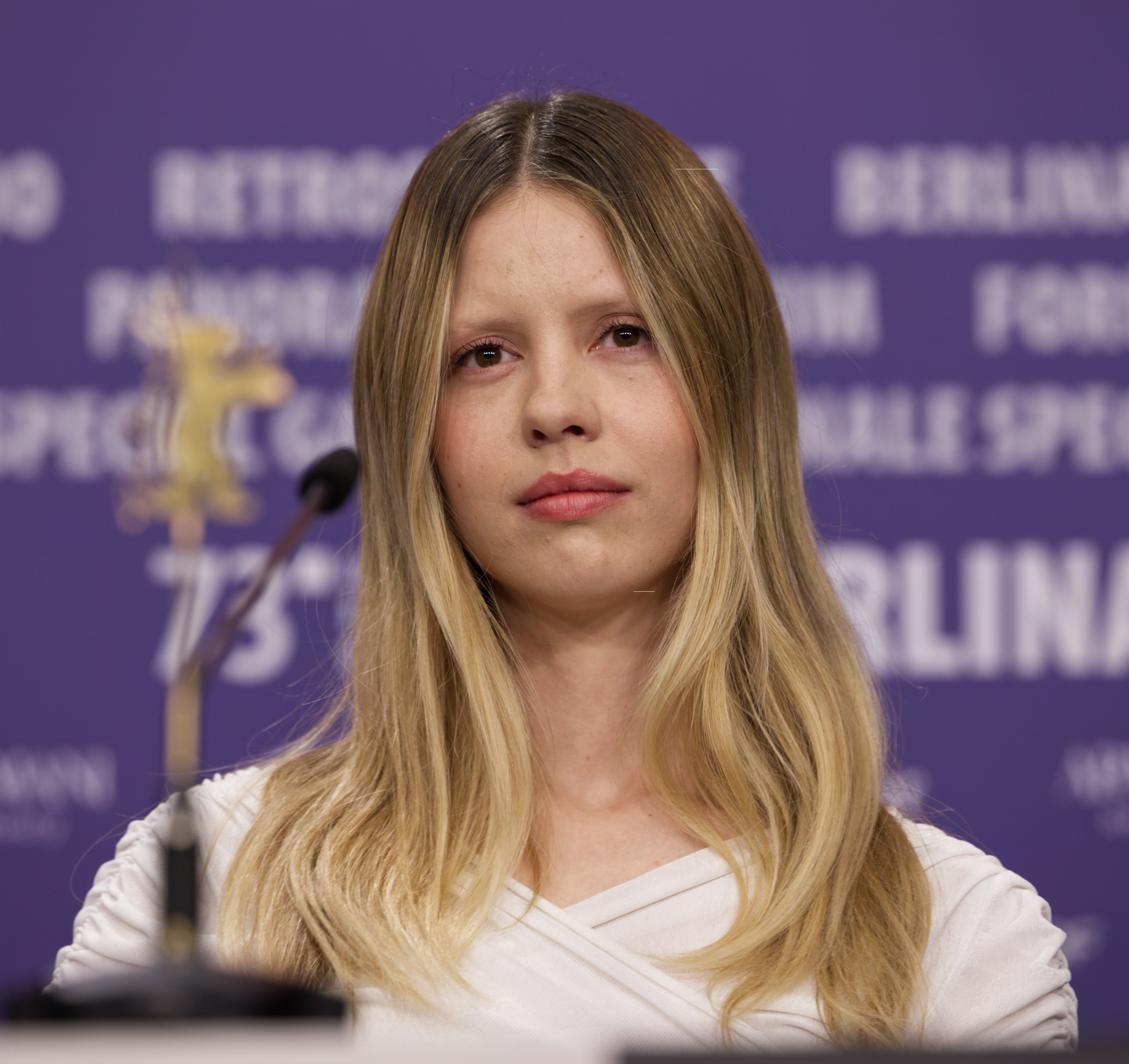
Mia Goth, who appears in the X franchise.

The character Maxine Minx (from X films), manages to escape the farm alone where she and her friends have endured horrors under the elderly couple during the night. While the focus of characterization signals her as the primary final-girl candidate early on, her open promiscuity marks a notable departure from the common criteria of the genre. Coinciding with the series’ themes of female sexual empowerment, Maxine's survival serves as a rebuttal of traditional slasher formulas on sexual autonomy.

==== Samantha Carpenter ====
Being the estranged daughter of the late Billy Loomis, Samantha Carpenter (from Scream (2022) and Scream VI) becomes the new target of the new generation of Ghostface killers. Throughout the film, it is revealed that she has been haunted by her father's past and struggles with the legacy he left behind. Her survival and eventual triumph over the killers further subverts the traditional Final Girl trope, as she is not presented as a purely innocent or virginal character. Instead, she is a "flawed and complex individual who is ultimately able to use her past trauma and inner strength to overcome the killers".

==== Sienna Shaw ====
Sienna is the main protagonist of the 2022 slasher film Terrifier 2. Her character was designed to be the good equivalent to the evil of Art the Clown, even down to the design of her later costume; a Valkyrie-style angel warrior. Unlike Vicky, Sienna is braver and more heroic and she actively poses a threat to Art, so far being the only person in the franchise to kill him. In the 2024 sequel Terrifier 3 Sienna reprises her role as the main protagonist and once again takes him on solo.

== List of Final Girls films ==
Name	Appearances	Actress	Description
Gale Weathers	1. Scream (1996); 2. Scream 2; 3. Scream 3; 4. Scream 4; 5. Scream (2022); 6. Scream VI; 7. Scream 7	Courteney Cox	A reporter, friend of Sidney and survivor of several Ghostface massacres.
Sidney Prescott	1. Scream (1996); 2. Scream 2; 3. Scream 3; 4. Scream 4; 5. Scream (2022); 6. Scream 7	Neve Campbell	Ghostface's main target, having survived several Ghostface killing sprees since teenanger.
Laurie Strode	1. Halloween (1978); 2. Halloween II (1981); 3. Halloween H20: 20 Years Later; 4. Halloween: Resurrection	Jamie Lee Curtis	The sole survivor 1978 killing spree, lives under the identity of "Keri Tate" and go into hiding from her murderous brother, Michael Myers. She is killed.
Laurie Strode	1. Halloween (1978); 2. Halloween (2018); 3. Halloween Kills; 4. Halloween Ends	Jamie Lee Curtis	The sole survivor of Michael Myers' 1978 killing spree, suffering from post-traumatic stress disorder.
Marybeth Dunston	1. Hatchet; 2. Hatchet II; 3. Hatchet III; 4. Victor Crowley	Tamara Feldman (2006); Danielle Harris (2010-2017)	A young woman who is a survivor of three massacres by Victor Crowley.
Julie James	1. I Know What You Did Last Summer (1997); 2. I Still Know What You Did Last Summer; 3. I Know What You Did Last Summer (2025)	Jennifer Love Hewitt	A college professor and a survivor of the 1997 Southport Massacre and The Fisherman primary target.
Mindy Meeks-Martin	1. Scream (2022); 2. Scream VI; 3. Scream 7	Jasmin Savoy Brown	Randy Meeks' niece and a survivor of the most recents murder sprees of Ghostface.
Nica Pierce	1. Curse of Chucky; 2. Cult of Chucky; 3. Chucky	Fiona Dourif	A paraplegic woman and the main target of the possessed doll, Chucky, and his girlfriend Tiffany Valentine.
Kyle	1. Child's Play 2; 2. Cult of Chucky; 3. Chucky	Christine Elise	Andy's older foster sister and frequently a target of Chucky, the killer doll, and his girlfriend Tiffany Valentine.
Allyson Nelson	1. Halloween (2018); 2. Halloween Kills; 3. Halloween Ends	Andi Matichak	Laurie Strode's granddaughter and the survivor of Michael Myers's killing spree in 2018.
Maya Lucas	1. The Strangers: Chapter 1; 2. The Strangers – Chapter 2; 3. The Strangers – Chapter 3	Madelaine Petsch	A young woman what is the only survivor of the Strangers group: Pin-Up Girl, Dollface, and Scarecrow.
Sally Hardesty	1. The Texas Chain Saw Massacre; 2. The Return of the Texas Chainsaw Massacre; 3. Texas Chainsaw Massacre	Marilyn Burns (1974-1995); Olwen Fouéré (2022)	A Texas ranger and the only survivor of Leatherface's killing spree in 1973. She is killed.
Jamie Lloyd	1. Halloween 4: The Return of Michael Myers; 2. Halloween 5: The Revenge of Michael Myers; 3. Halloween: The Curse of Michael Myers	Danielle Harris (1988-1989); J. C. Brandy (1995)	Laurie's orphaned daughter and the niece of serial killer Michael Myers who becomes her uncle's new main target. She is killed.
Victoria Heyes	1. Terrifier; 2. Terrifier 2; 3. Terrifier 3	Samantha Scaffidi	The first sole survivor of Art the Clown who becomes possessed by the Little Pale Girl and acts as Art's partner-in-crime. She is killed.
Kirby Reed	1. Scream 4; 2. Scream VI	Hayden Panettiere	A horror film fanatic, survivor of the Ghostface murders who is now an FBI agent
Samantha Carpenter	1. Scream (2022); 2. Scream VI	Melissa Barrera	The daughter of original Ghostface and survivor and target of the new Ghostface murders.
Tara Carpenter	1. Scream (2022); 2. Scream VI	Jenna Ortega	Samantha's half-sister and survivor of the Ghostface killings.
Karla Wilson	1. I Still Know What You Did Last Summer; 2. I Know What You Did Last Summer (2025)	Brandy Norwood	A Julie's college friend and a survivor of the 1998 Tower Bay massacre by The Fisherman.
Sienna Shaw	1. Terrifier 2; 2. Terrifier 3	Lauren LaVera	As a young woman interested who is a main target and battles the enigmatic Art the Clown.
Maxine Minx	1. X 2. MaXXXine	Mia Goth	The only survivor of a massacre, who wants to become a famous actress while being chased by a mysterious killer.
Nancy Thompson	1. A Nightmare on Elm Street; 2. A Nightmare on Elm Street 3: Dream Warriors	Heather Langenkamp	A young adult, intern therapist and the only survivor of Freddy Krueger's killing spree. She is killed.
Clear Rivers	1. Final Destination; 2. Final Destination 2	Ali Larter	The last survivor of Flight 180, that helps Kimberly in saving the new set of victims from the Route 23 pile-up. She dies.
Annie Brackett	1. Halloween (2007); 2. Halloween II (2008)	Danielle Harris	Laurie's sassy friend and Lindsey's babysitter who survived the attack by Michael Myers. She is killed.
Judy Hicks	1. Scream 4; 2. Scream (2022)	Marley Shelton	Sheriff at Woodsboro, survivor of the Ghostface killings in 2011. She is killed.
Karen Nelson	1. Halloween (2018); 2. Halloween Kills	Judy Greer	Laurie Strode's estranged daughter and Allyson's mother. She is killed.
Jess Bradford	Black Christmas (1974)	Olivia Hussey	Is a member of the sorority house Pi Kappa Sig and the last survivor of villain Billy.
Kelli Presley	Black Christmas (2006)	Katie Cassidy	Is a member of the Delta Alpha Kappa sorority and sole survivor of Billy and Agnes Lenz.
Kristy Cotton	Hellraiser	Ashley Laurence	
Kimberly Corman	Final Destination 2	A.J. Cook	A visionary and the only person who managed to successfully remove herself from the Death List.
Wendy Christensen	Final Destination 3	Mary Elizabeth Winstead	A visionary, one of the survivors of the Devil's Flight roller coaster crash, and final survivor to die.
Tatum Evans	Scream 7	Isabel May	Sidney's daughter and Ghostface's new main target.

== See also ==
- Alfred Hitchcock and representation of women
- Feminist film theory
- Final Girl (film)
- The Final Girls
- Gender in horror films
- Ready or Not
- Scream queen
- Women in refrigerators
