= I Know What You Did Last Summer (disambiguation) =

I Know What You Did Last Summer is a 1997 American slasher film based on the 1973 novel.

I Know What You Did Last Summer may also refer to:

== Franchise ==
- I Know What You Did Last Summer (novel), a 1973 suspense novel for young adults by Lois Duncan
- I Know What You Did Last Summer (franchise)
  - I Still Know What You Did Last Summer, a 1998 slasher film and a sequel to the 1997 film
  - I'll Always Know What You Did Last Summer, a 2006 horror film released straight to DVD and the third installment in the series
  - I Know What You Did Last Summer (TV series), a 2021 Amazon Prime TV series
  - I Know What You Did Last Summer (2025 film), a slasher film and legacy sequel to the 1998 film

== Other uses ==
- "I Know What You Did Last Summer" (Supernatural), an episode of the TV series Supernatural
- "I Know What You Did Last Summer" (The Vampire Diaries), an episode of the TV series The Vampire Diaries
- "I Know What You Did Last Summer" (Scream), an episode of the TV series Scream
- "I Know What You Did Last Summer" (song), a 2015 song by Shawn Mendes and Camila Cabello
- "IK What You Did Last Summer", a 2024 song by OsamaSon
- "I Know What You Did Last Summer", a 2015 song by Jacob Whitesides featuring Kelly Rowland

== See also ==
- "I Know What You'll Do Next Summer", a third-season episode of the mystery series Veronica Mars
- I Know How Many Runs You Scored Last Summer, cricket-themed low-budget Australian horror-comedy flick
