= Helen Shivers =

Fictional character from I Know What You Did Last Summer

- I Know What You Did Last Summer character
- First appearance: I Know What You Did Last Summer (1973); I Know What You Did Last Summer (films)
- Last appearance: I Know What You Did Last Summer (2025)
- Created by: Lois Duncan
- Portrayed by: Sarah Michelle Gellar

In-universe information
- Full name: Helen Rivers (novel); Helen Shivers (films)
- Title: Croaker Queen (films), Golden Girl (novel)
- Occupation: Department Store Clerk (films), News Caster (novel)
- Family: Elsa Shivers (older sister, deceased); Mr. Shivers (father); Mrs. Shivers (mother)
- Significant other: Barry Cox (ex-boyfriend, deceased)
- Status: Deceased

Helen Shivers is a fictional character in the I Know What You Did Last Summer franchise. She was created by American writer Lois Duncan and originates from Duncan's 1973 suspense novel I Know What You Did Last Summer as a young woman involved in a hit and run accident. In the novel, she is known as Helen Rivers. She is portrayed by actress Sarah Michelle Gellar in the Kevin Williamson scripted feature film I Know What You Did Last Summer (1997) as the Croaker Queen of the Southport Beauty Pageant. Her chase sequence with the killer of the film has been deemed iconic and has been described as toying with the audience's expectations. Gellar briefly reprises the role in 2025 in the fourth installment of the franchise during a dream sequence.

For her performance, she was portrayed in 2018 by Greer Grammer in the musical parody I Know What You Did Last Summer: The Unauthorized Musical that premiered at the El Cid in Los Angeles. The character is particularly notable for challenging horror film tropes of the time, in which the characters (in most cases teenage victims) were left underdeveloped and without a substantial story arc.

== Appearances ==
=== Literature ===
Helen originates from Lois Duncan's 1973 suspense novel I Know What You Did Last Summer, in which her name is Helen Rivers. She is depicted as a high school drop out from a large, financially struggling family who manages to launch a successful television career as presenter after submitting her photograph to the studio's beauty contest. She was involved in a hit-and-run accident of a cycling boy with her boyfriend Barry Cox, and friends Julie James and Ray Bronson. Helen is obsessively in love with Barry, and believes he loves her too and plans to marry her once he finishes college'; however Barry has no romantic interest in Helen at all, and dates her primarily for her beauty and fame, and repeatedly cheats on her with other girls. Helen is reluctantly forced to accept Barry's indifference to her near the end of the novel. She also suffers verbal abuse from her bitter older sister, Elsa, who is resentful of Helen's good looks and success on television. Unlike in the film version, Helen was never popular at high school, as other girls were envious of her relationship with Barry, the handsome, rich and popular star footballer of the school. She was a poor student and relies purely on her looks to get her places.

A year after the hit-and-run, Julie reveals a letter to Helen that says "I know what you did last summer". The next day, while tanning at her luxury apartment complex she meets Collingsworth Wilson who moved into one of the vacant apartments the day before. She later finds a magazine cutout of a boy riding a bicycle taped to her apartment door. After a series of bizarre encounters with the anonymous figure toying with them, Helen is confronted by Collingsworth at her apartment, who reveals himself to be the older half-brother of the young boy she and her friends accidentally ran over and killed. She locks herself inside her bathroom and escapes through her window as he tries to break the door down. Later, Helen calls the police and sends them to Julie's house, who was Collingsworth's next target.

=== Film ===
Shivers makes her cinematic debut in the 1997 film. Although she and her friends graduated from high school a few weeks before the film starts, Helen is implied to have been an extremely popular girl in high school, and there are cheerleading pom-poms seen in her bedroom, implying that she was one. On the Fourth of July, Helen wins the Fourth of July Croaker Beauty Pageant and reveals aspirations as a New York-based actress. Afterwards, she goes to the beach with her friends Julie James, Barry Cox, and Ray Bronson. While driving on the byway, they accidentally run over a pedestrian. They decide to dump the body into the sea and to never talk about what happened.

A year later, she is revealed to have failed as an actress — much to the delight of her spiteful elder sister Elsa — and now works at her family's store. When Julie receives a letter with no return address, stating, "I know what you did last summer!" she tracks her down and the duo reunite with Barry and Ray. The rest of the group begin to receive taunting messages from the mysterious assailant. One morning, Helen wakes up to find her hair cut off and "Soon" written in lipstick on her mirror.

At the Croaker Beauty Pageant, Helen witnesses the murder of Barry on the balcony. With his body nowhere to be found, a police officer escorts a hysterical Helen home, but the killer murders him in an alleyway. Helen breaks out of the back of the police car and is chased to her family's store. The killer enters through the unlocked back door and murders Elsa. Helen is chased to the third floor of the building and jumps out of the window. She manages to make it a few feet away from a parade, but the killer appears behind her and begins to slash her, her screams being obscured by the parade. Her corpse is later discovered by Julie.

Shivers appears through photographs in I Still Know What You Did Last Summer (1998), while Sarah Michelle Gellar reprises the role for a cameo in I Know What You Did Last Summer (2025) where she appears during a dream sequence experienced by Danica Richards.

== Development ==
There's a horrible chase scene where she knows this is it. If he gets her he is going to kill her and that's kind of it for her. So she has to really—she's really running for her life at this point. Up until then, the fisherman was using scare tactics. He was frightening them, he was sending them letters, was toying with them, he was playing with them. Now it's serious.

— Gellar discussing Helen's iconic chase sequence

The character originates from American writer Lois Duncan's 1973 suspense novel I Know What You Did Last Summer as one of the main characters involved in a hit-and-run accident. In this version she is named Helen Rivers, her family is poorer and larger than in the film, and she is not murdered. Her aspirations as an actress are found with greater success in the novel than in the film adaptation. Sarah Michelle Gellar was the last of the lead actors to be cast. In the 1997 film, she has been described as a "local beauty-pageant winner who wants to become an actress". Shivers is initially depicted as a vapid, egotistical beauty queen, but over the course of the film she is shown to be a very affectionate person despite her dysfunctional home life and overt loneliness.

Alexandra West attests that the film constantly alludes to her physical attractiveness and superficial vanity, writing that "Helen is constantly framed in doorways and mirrors, lending to the notion that she is an object to be looked at and that her looks are her most indelible quality." However, she notes that this is a stark contrast to her profound personal struggles that are revealed later in the film:

"Director Jim Gillespie makes it clear that Helen is completely and utterly alone with no true connections, so much that she appears almost relieved when the notes that says, "I know what you did last summer" begin appearing, as it gives her an excuse to reconnect with her friends. Her death is equal parts tense and tragic."

== Popular culture ==
The character was spoofed in the form of Buffy Gilmore (a nod to Sarah Michelle Gellar's Buffy the Vampire Slayer), a character portrayed by Shannon Elizabeth in the Keenen Ivory Wayans directed parody film Scary Movie (2000) and by Buffy the Vampire Slayer co-star Julie Benz in Shriek If You Know What I Did Last Friday the 13th.

In 2018, Greer Grammer was cast in the musical parody I Know What You Did Last Summer: The Unauthorized Musical that premiered at the El Cid in Los Angeles.

== Reception ==
For her portrayal, Gellar earned her a Blockbuster Entertainment Award for Favorite Supporting Actress – Horror and a MTV Movie Award nomination for Best Breakthrough Performance.

Chris Eggertsen of Uproxx described the character as being complex. Eggertsen praised Gellar for giving a "compelling" performance and for being able to transform Helen from a vapid self absorbed beauty queen to a fully realized and sympathetic character. Similarly, writer Sara Century of Syfy Wire described her as a "compelling character" and is notably different from other horror film characters due to her intimate character arc, "Helen is a compelling character especially in horror, a genre that traditionally fails to give emotional backing to its doomed teenagers. On the surface, she's shallow, obsessed with beauty pageants and trips to New York. Yet there's something haunted in Helen from the very beginning, and it gives her character a lot more weight than what we see at face value. There have been full essays written on her death scene alone, and she has remained surprisingly influential." West states that her story line is the most visible out of the four central characters.

While there are positive reviews, Stephen Hunter of The Washington Post thought that Gellar “seems stranded here, her performance never escaping the beauty-queen cliché the script locks her into.” Desson Howe, also of The Washington Post, described her as “a soap-opera caricature in a horror movie prom dress.” Rob Vaux of Flipside Movie Emporium similarly argued that “Sarah Michelle Gellar’s talents are wasted; she’s reduced to running in heels and screaming on cue.”

== Works cited ==
- West, Alexandra (June 5, 2018). The 1990s Teen Horror Cycle Final Girls and a New Hollywood Formula. McFarland. ISBN 978-1476631-28-8.
- Harper, Jim (2004). Legacy of Blood A Comprehensive Guide to Slasher Movies. Critical Vision. ISBN 978-1900486-39-2.
- Duncan, Lois (5 October 2010). I Know What You Did Last Summer. Little, Brown Books for Young Readers. ISBN 978-0316182-62-1.
