= Julie James (I Know What You Did Last Summer) =

Fictional character from I Know What You Did Last Summer

- I Know What You Did Last Summer character
- Jennifer Love Hewitt as Julie James in I Know What You Did Last Summer
- First appearance: I Know What You Did Last Summer; (1973)
- Created by: Lois Duncan
- Portrayed by: Jennifer Love Hewitt

In-universe information
- Occupation: High school student (graduated); College student (graduated); College Professor
- Significant others: Ray Bronson (ex-husband); Bud (dating, only novels)
- Origin: Silver Springs, New Mexico (novel); Southport, North Carolina (films)

Julie James is a fictional character in the I Know What You Did Last Summer franchise. The character was created by American writer Lois Duncan and appears in her 1973 suspense novel I Know What You Did Last Summer. In the story, Julie is a young woman whose friend group is involved in a hit-and-run accident. Actress Jennifer Love Hewitt portrayed Julie in the Kevin Williamson-scripted feature film I Know What You Did Last Summer (1997), in which she is the final girl. She returns in the sequels I Still Know What You Did Last Summer (1998) and I Know What You Did Last Summer (2025).

Over the years, the character has received generally weak reception because of her role in the first film, with many arguing that other characters in the story were more compelling and should have survived over Julie. However, her character development over the course of the series has led some critics to appreciate her more.

== Appearances ==
=== Literature ===
Julie originates from Lois Duncan's 1973 suspense novel I Know What You Did Last Summer. She is a high school senior who lives in the fictional New Mexico city of Silver Springs with her widowed mother. Initially a fun-loving cheerleader with an active social life and an ambivalent attitude toward her education, near the end of her junior year, Julie was involved in a hit-and-run accident of a cycling boy with her boyfriend Ray Bronson, and friends Barry Cox and Helen Rivers. Overwhelmed with guilt and fear, Julie quit cheerleading, grew distant from her friends and devoted herself to her schoolwork in an attempt to get accepted to a college as far away from home as possible to forget about that night she and her friends accidentally killed the boy.

One year later, she receives a sinister note alluding to a past tragedy involving herself and her group. Despite Ray's attempts to reassure her, Julie's instincts drive her to seek answers, further reinforced when she visits Helen, hoping for comfort and support. She suggests visiting the Greggs, the family of David, the boy who died in the accident, in search of clues. During their visit to the Gregg household, Julie engages in conversation with Megan, David's mother, hoping to glean information about the mysterious note. Through their conversation, Julie learns more about the impact of David's death on the Gregg family, deepening her empathy for their grief. Julie's resolve is further tested when Barry is shot and left paralyzed. She supports Ray as he grapples with guilt and tries to convince Barry to break their pact of silence. As the tension escalates, Julie's instincts lead her to suspect Collie, a new acquaintance of Helen's, as the perpetrator behind the threats. Her suspicions are confirmed when Collie reveals himself to be David's brother and attempts to harm her. In a climactic confrontation, Julie finds herself in mortal danger as Collie, now revealed as Bud, attempts to kill her. Through sheer willpower and determination, Julie survives the ordeal, rescued by Ray's timely intervention. Throughout the harrowing ordeal, Julie undergoes a profound transformation, emerging as a resilient and courageous young woman. Her unwavering determination to uncover the truth and confront her fears ultimately leads to her survival and newfound strength, leading to her eventual confession of her guilt.

=== Film ===
Julie makes her cinematic debut in the 1997 film. On the Fourth of July, her friend Helen Shivers wins the Fourth of July Croaker Beauty Pageant and after celebrating, Julie and Helen go to the beach with Julie's boyfriend Ray Bronson and Helen's boyfriend Barry Cox. While driving on the byway, they accidentally run over a pedestrian. They decide to dump the body into the sea and never talk about what happened. One year later, Julie left Southport, North Carolina, and receives a letter that reads "I know what you did last summer!". Returning to her hometown, she reunites with Helen, Barry, and Ray, telling them that the man they hit was named David Egan and that his death was labeled an accidental drowning. When a hook-handed killer begins to menace the town, Helen and Julie visit David's sister Missy for more information, but Julie is overcome with guilt and leaves. Julie returns to Missy's, only now with suspicion of a man named Billy Blue. Missy tells Julie that David killed himself and Julie figures out that David wasn't the man they hit, and that another man named Ben Willis is likely the culprit. Ben tricks Julie into boarding his boat before undocking it. Ray catches up to their boat and saves Julie by cutting Ben Willis's hand off and sending him overboard.

Julie returns in the film's 1998 sequel. With the first anniversary of the events of the first movie, Julie has become increasingly paranoid, but her spirits seem lifted when she and her new friend Karla win four tickets to the Bahamas, enough for them, Karla's boyfriend Tye, and one more person. Julie initially wants Ray to come, but he declines and Julie instead invites her other friend Will Benson. While singing karaoke there, Julie receives a message on the karaoke machine, reading "I still know what you did last summer." When people start being murdered, Julie starts seeing visions of their corpses, and when she asks to leave she is told that an upcoming storm means that will be impossible. The killer tries to tie a tanning bed shut with Julie inside, but she is saved by her friends and she saved Karla from the killer with the axe. With all the hotel staff being murdered, the group is ambushed by the killer, who is revealed to be Ben Willis, who survived the first movie, and Will, who is revealed to be his son. Julie is saved by Ray again, who just arrived on the island and takes down Will. Julie then shoots Ben to death. The next morning, Julie, Karla, and Ray are rescued from the island.

Julie returned in the 2025 sequel, now as a college professor living outside Southport. By this time Julie and Ray have been married but divorced some years ago, their relationship embittered due to their different methods of dealing with their trauma over the murders. Despite her vow not to return to Southport, Julie becomes concerned when she is visited by Ava Brucks, one of a group of young people being stalked by a new killer who has intimate knowledge of Ben Willis's killer tactics. Julie eventually returns to Southport when she realizes that while one of the killers is Ava's friend Stevie, Stevie had help from Ray, who owns the bar where Stevie works and had learned Ben's tactics throughout his ordeals; the victim in this accident was Sam Cooper, a friend Stevie made in rehab, with Ray deciding to help Stevie face her trauma by killing the people she blamed for what happened. Julie subsequently helps Ava to get a harpoon gun nearby and kill Ray when he rants about plans to frame Julie for the murder spree. Julie subsequently seeks out Karla to warn her that there may be another murder spree in the future, as Stevie's body has vanished rather than her being explicitly dead.

== In popular culture ==
The character was spoofed in the 2000 parody film Scary Movie. The character Cindy Campbell, played by Anna Faris, was based on Julie and Sidney Prescott. Jennifer Love Hewitt appeared in a cameo in the Boy Meets World episode "And Then There Was Shawn" in which she parodied a scene where Julie shouts in the 1997 film.

In 2018, Bianca Giselle was cast in the musical parody I Know What You Did Last Summer: The Unauthorized Musical that premiered at the El Cid in Los Angeles.

== Reception ==
Julie is generally considered a weak final girl character due to her incompetence, passive behaviour, and lack of redeeming qualities compared to other characters in the franchise, most notably Helen Shivers, Ray Bronson, and Karla Wilson. Writing for Bloody Disgusting in 2017, Trace Thurman wrote that "Julie James is a terrible Final Girl", arguing that the character Helen Shivers should have filled the role, saying "Helen is a much deeper and [more] likable character. Julie is boring and useless". Kate Hudson of Pajiba wrote "Julie is an OK final girl, it's just that Helen would have been better". Desirae Gooding-Nieves of CBR criticised Julie's character in comparison to Helen's, writing, "By granting Julie the unearned and predictable status of final girl, I Know What You Did Last Summer fails to cement itself as anything unique or surprising".

In 2021, WhatCulture listed Julie as one of 5 horror movie characters who should have died, arguing that she is "one of horror's weakest final girls" and that "Helen Shivers is far more likable and entertaining than the film's actual protagonist". Jack Pooley of WhatCulture also believed Julie is difficult to root for, as "she's just not particularly likable or interesting". In 2021, Amanda Bruce of Screen Rant criticised Julie's lack of initiative, writing that "Julie doesn't actually get to do much fighting. More often than not, it's her high school boyfriend who fights her battles after she's done her best to confront the bad guy". Jacki Billings of PewPew Tactical criticised Julie in the first film, calling her a "damsel in distress", but praised her development in its sequel, writing "In the second film, Julie comes a little more into her own". Daric L. Cottingham of Reckon argued that in the sequel, Karla Wilson was a more interesting character, writing "While Julie is the main character, it's Karla who shines throughout the movie". Victoria Rose Caister of Game Rant said, "She puts herself in unnecessary danger in a way that comes across far more idiotic than heroic".

Shaun Stacy of SlashFilm praised Julie's characterisation, writing "Julie is highly resourceful; she's a survivor even if she doesn't always want to be, and that's more realistic than anything else we had seen in a horror film in a long time". In a July 2025 cover story for Dread Central, writer Josh Korngut described Julie as a genre underdog who deserves to stand alongside Laurie Strode and Sidney Prescott. This was partly because other horror franchise protagonists received earlier opportunities for legacy revivals. In an August 2025 Bloody Disgusting, writer Jenn Adams described Julie as an empowered heroine with a strong moral compass.

Hewitt's role in the film led to her being considered a scream queen. Josh Sorokach of Decider praised the actress's scream, writing "Sidney Prescott may be tougher, but the true queen of scream is Jennifer Love Hewitt". For her portrayal of Julie James, Jennifer Love Hewitt received the Blockbuster Entertainment Award for Favorite Female Newcomer in 1998. The following year, she won the Blockbuster Entertainment Award for Favorite Actress – Horror, surpassing her idol Jamie Lee Curtis, who had been nominated for Halloween H20: 20 Years Later. Hewitt also earned the Choice Actress – Film award at the 1999 Teen Choice Awards. In addition, she was honored with the Chick You Don’t Wanna Mess With (Best Heroine) award at the 1998 Fangoria Chainsaw Awards,
