= And Then There Was Shawn =

- Boy Meets World episode
- The main cast find a cryptic message on the blackboard.
- Episode no.: Season 5 Episode 17
- Directed by: Jeff McCracken
- Written by: Jeff Menell
- Production code: B758
- Original air date: February 27, 1998

Guest appearances
- Jennifer Love Hewitt as Jennifer Love Fefferman; Richard Lee Jackson as Kenny

Episode chronology
← Previous "Torn between Two Lovers (Feeling Like a Fool)"	Next → "If You Can't Be with the One You Love..."

"And Then There Was Shawn" is the seventeenth episode of the fifth season of the television series Boy Meets World, written by Jeff Menell and directed by Jeff McCracken. It premiered on ABC in the United States on February 27, 1998. The episode, a parody of various slasher films, features the cast being stalked by an unknown killer after being trapped in the school during detention. It has been frequently cited as the best episode in the series.

== Plot ==
After a fight between the recently broken up Cory and Topanga caused by Shawn escalates in Mr. Feeny's class, Cory, Topanga, Shawn, Angela, and Kenny are given detention. Feeny leaves and the map screen pulls up, revealing "No One Gets Out Alive" written on the chalkboard in blood. The group find themselves locked in the classroom, and a creepy janitor appears in the hallway and refuses to let them out. After Eric and Jack appear and unlock the room, the lights briefly go out and Kenny is murdered by being stabbed through the head with a pencil, in reference to the then recently premiered South Park.

The group find all the exits are chained shut, and a mysterious masked figure is seen lurking behind them. Feeny suddenly appears and collapses, having been stabbed in the back with a pair of scissors. The group finds the janitor's body in his cleaning cart. Eric finds Jennifer Love Fefferman ("Feffie") wandering in the hallway, who he suspects is the killer, but starts kissing her after she says she isn't.

After the group splits up, Feffie is mortally wounded in the library after the killer pushes a pile of books on top of her. She tries to tell Eric who the killer is, but both are killed by another pile of books. In grief, Jack attempts to jump out a window but is stopped by Angela before both are pushed to their deaths by the killer. Cory, Shawn and Topanga confront the killer, and Shawn unmasks him, revealing the killer is a doppelgänger of himself.

Shawn wakes up in detention, revealing the events were a dream. He tells Feeny the fight was his fault. Cory and Topanga assure Shawn their break up isn't his fault, and Feeny releases them from detention. After they leave, the killer appears again and runs out of the room. In a post-credits scene, Feeny dreams that he has a class of knowledgeable, outstanding students. He awakens to a loud and unruly class and holds up a pair of scissors contemplatively.

== Production ==
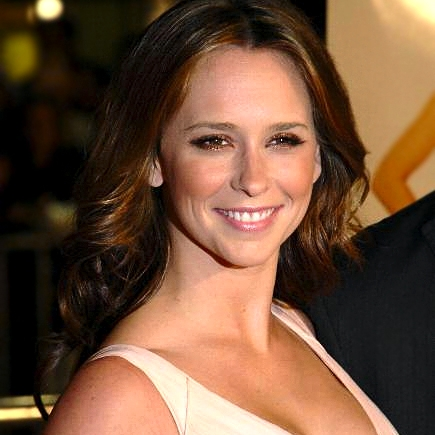
Jennifer Love Hewitt guest stars in the episode.

"And Then There Was Shawn" was conceived as a parody of then-recent horror films Scream and I Know What You Did Last Summer. Episode director Jeff McCracken stated that the network was originally apprehensive about producing the episode, "They told us, 'You really departed from format, and it could be too scary for our audience.'" The episode used frequent handheld camera and point-of-view shots, inspired by the film Halloween. The episode departed from the show's usual visual format and mimicked the aesthetic style of a film, shooting out of sequence using a single-camera format, and without a studio audience for majority of the taping. The reveal of Shawn being the killer is meant to represent, "staring at his jealousy, at his worst self." The writers also inserted numerous references to South Park and Scooby-Doo. The cast enjoyed filming the episode and being able to break character.

Jennifer Love Hewitt, who starred as Julie James in I Know What You Did Last Summer, was dating cast member Will Friedle at the time, and was cast in the episode at the suggestion of director Jeff McCracken.

Although it has often been claimed that Joe Turkel, known for roles in The Shining and Blade Runner, made an uncredited appearance as the creepy janitor, McCracken debunked this, and says the janitor was played by an unknown actor found by the casting directors, saying "They brought in that guy and we all just went, 'Yes, perfect.' I don’t even know if he’s an actor — I’ve never seen him again. He just had one of those looks."

== Broadcast ==
The episode earned an 8.5 Nielsen rating during its initial broadcast. Though not conceived as a Halloween episode (the series had produced "The Witches of Pennbrook" as its 1997 Halloween special), it was frequently rebroadcast on Halloween. Writer Jeff Menell states the network received some complaints from viewers claiming the episode was too scary.

== Reception ==
Various websites and reviewers have called "And Then There Was Shawn" one of the best episodes of Boy Meets World. A retrospective by The A.V. Club referred to it as the best episode of the series. Screen Rant called it "the perfect tribute to horror movies of the '90s". Yardbarker referred to it as "the greatest episode of any series on TGIF", IGN ranked it third on their list of the best episodes of the series. BuzzFeed ranked the episode fourth on its list of "The 15 Best Halloween TV Episodes Ever", and Us Weekly included it on their list of best Halloween episodes.
