= Ghostfacers =

The Ghostfacers are a group of fictional characters from the television series Supernatural. Originally known as the Hell Hounds, the characters were created by Trey Callaway in Episode 1.17, entitled "Hell House".

Ghostfacers may also refer to:

- "Ghostfacers", a 2008 episode of Supernatural
- Ghostfacers, a webisode series of Supernatural

== See also ==
- Ghostface (disambiguation)
- Ghost-faced bat
