= Ghostface =

Ghostface may refer to:

- Ghostface (Scream), a fictional identity used in the Scream franchise
- Ghostface, a nickname used by the Marvel Comics character Gwenpool
- Ghostface Killah, an American rapper and a member of the hip hop group Wu-Tang Clan
- Ghost-Faced Killer, a villain in the 1979 kung fu film The Mystery of Chess Boxing

== See also ==
- Ghostfacers (disambiguation)
- Ghost-faced bat
