= I Know What You Did Last Summer (novel) =

1973 novel by Lois Duncan

- First edition cover
- Author: Lois Duncan
- Language: English
- Genre: Young adult fiction, thriller
- Published: October 1973
- Publisher: Little Brown
- Publication place: United States
- Media type: Print (hardcover & paperback)
- Pages: 199 (first edition, hardback)
- ISBN: 0-316-19546-4 (first edition, hardback)
- OCLC: 640901
- LC Class: PZ7.D9117 Iak

I Know What You Did Last Summer is a 1973 suspense novel for young adults by Lois Duncan. A film adaptation loosely based on the novel was released in 1997 and spawned a media franchise.

== Plot ==
In the fictional town of Silver Springs, near the Cibola National Forest, high school senior Julie James receives a note in the mail that reads, "I know what you did last summer". The previous summer, Julie, her then-boyfriend Ray Bronson, Ray's best friend Barry Cox, and Barry's girlfriend and Julie’s best friend Helen Rivers were driving home after partying in the mountains. They accidentally ran over and killed David Gregg, a young bicycling boy. (Note: In the first edition of the novel his given name is David, which is the name used throughout the article. In the 2010 revised edition (ISBN 0-316-09899-X), his name was changed to Daniel.) After Ray anonymously calls an ambulance for David, the four make a pact never to tell anyone about their involvement in the incident. Julie and Ray subsequently drift apart from one another, and Ray moves to California for work. Out of guilt, Julie anonymously sends yellow roses to David's funeral.

After receiving the note, Julie visits Helen. Barry is invited over, and he reassures the girls that it is just a prank and that anyone who knows about their involvement would go to the police instead of leaving notes. Ray returns home after a year away in California and tries to get back together with Julie. However, she is not interested, and he learns that she is dating Bud, who recently served in the army. The next day, Helen is tanning at her apartment complex when she meets Collingsworth "Collie" Wilson, who moved into one of the apartments the day before. After this encounter, Helen finds a magazine cutout of a boy riding a bicycle taped to her apartment door. Ray also receives a newspaper clipping in the mail about David Gregg that same day.

On Memorial Day, Barry gets a call from someone offering to sell a picture the caller says shows a car hitting David's bicycle. They agree to meet on the athletic field. When Barry gets there, he is shot in the stomach by an unknown person. The bullet becomes lodged in his spine and threatens to paralyze him. Julie and Ray meet to discuss the shooting and decide to visit the house of David's parents to see if they could have been involved. At the Greggs', Ray and Julie use the excuse of car trouble, and Megan, David's sister, lets them in. Ray goes into the hallway and pretends to make a call while Julie talks to Megan. Megan says that their mother had a breakdown following David's death and was sent to a hospital in Las Lunas, and their father moved there to be close to her.

Ray later sneaks into the hospital to visit Barry. Barry lies about the shooting and says that someone was trying to rob him. When Barry finds out that he will be able to walk, he calls Helen because he wants to confess that the caller was the person who shot him and that she is in danger. Helen is out and misses the call; she later sees Collie after returning to her apartment. Collie says that he is David's older brother and that he shot Barry as revenge for his involvement in the accident. He found out who had run him down by questioning the saleswoman from whom Julie had bought the yellow roses. He determined Helen was involved in the hit-and-run when Julie went to Helen's apartment after Julie received the note. Helen realizes that Collie plans to kill her and locks herself in her bathroom. After Collie tries to take the door off its hinges, she breaks the bathroom window and escapes.

That evening, Julie prepares for her date with Bud. However, her mother has an ominous premonition and asks Julie to stay home, to which she agrees. When Bud arrives, he convinces her to walk him back to his car so that they can talk. At his car, Bud says that his younger brother David had given him the name Bud because he could not pronounce "Collingsworth", revealing himself as Collie Wilson. He reveals that he knows that Julie was involved in the hit-and-run and he begins to strangle Julie. Ray, who received a call from Barry warning that they were in danger, appears and beats Collie unconscious with a flashlight. The police arrive after being sent by Helen to Julie's house. Julie and Ray agree that it is time to confess what they did last summer.

== Background and publication history ==
I Know What You Did Last Summer was first published in October 1973 by Little, Brown and Company in hardcover. Duncan got the idea for the book while she was making dinner and her daughter Kerry was having a conversation with a friend in the kitchen. Kerry told her friend about a boy who interested her, and her friend was considering what to wear on her upcoming date. The two eventually found out they were talking about the same boy. Duncan began to wonder what would happen if "the boy had deliberately implanted himself in the lives of two girls he knew were friends" and if "he built up a different personality to present to each of them". Duncan later read a story about a hit-and-run in the newspaper, which led her to incorporate one into the novel.

On October 5, 2010, Little Brown reissued the novel in paperback with updates to modernize some of the content. I Know What You Did Last Summer was in the first group of 10 different titles that were updated and reissued with these changes. In the revised edition, Duncan gave her characters cell phones and updated some of her characters' clothing choices. The war Collie Wilson had fought in was changed from the Vietnam War to the Iraq War.

An audiobook, read by Dennis Holland, was released by Hachette Audio in 2010 and features the modernized text. Lizzie Matkowski from Booklist thought that early on in the audiobook Holland "establishes a sense of normalcy in both the dialogue and narrative, which makes the revelations of what Julie and her friends did and their attempts to go on normally stand out starkly". She stated that the characters are deeply flawed, but that "Holland manages to redeem them little by little by emphasizing their naivete, youth, and regret".

== Reception ==
A movie tie-in edition of the novel released by Pocket Books in October 1997 sold 517,000 copies by November 1998. It was listed by Publishers Weekly as the top-selling children's fiction book for October, November and December 1997. A 1999 paperback edition published by Dell was selected as a 2005 Popular Paperback for Young Adults by the American Library Association.

A reviewer from Kirkus Reviews felt that Barry and Helen "are so vacuous that one hardly cares whether they get murdered or not". They stated that, despite this, the "madman murderer is cleverly concealed among a bevy of red herrings, and, as he zeroes in for his revenge, this turns into a high-velocity chiller with a double identity twist". Jennifer Moody writes in The Times Literary Supplement that "the mystery of who is responsible for the letters, the threats, and the violence, is handled with skill and panache". She added that Duncan "makes illuminating contrasts between the relationships of Julie and Ray on the one hand and Helen and Barry on the other". Complete Review's M. A. Orthofer gave the story a B− rating, stating that the story was a "reasonably suspenseful guilt-ridden thriller", but that "the writing (and some of the plotting) is very, very basic".

== Franchise ==
=== Film adaptation ===
The novel was adapted into a 1997 film of the same name directed by Jim Gillespie and starring Jennifer Love Hewitt as Julie, Sarah Michelle Gellar as Helen, Ryan Phillippe as Barry, and Freddie Prinze Jr. as Ray. Although it retained the same premise of the novel, the story was re-envisioned as a slasher film, with the four friends being hunted by a hook-wielding killer, and takes place in the town of Southport, North Carolina. The film further deviates from the novel by having the friends accidentally run over a fisherman named Ben Willis, who secretly survives and is revealed as the killer. The film also features the deaths of several characters, including Barry and Helen. Duncan was critical of the adaptation, stating in a 2002 interview she was "appalled" her story was turned into a slasher film and, "As the mother of a murdered child, I don't find violent death something to squeal and giggle about."

The film was met with mixed reviews, but was a commercial success and spawned a film series consisting of a direct sequel in 1998, a standalone third film in 2006, and a legacy sequel to the first two films in 2025. Hewitt and Prinze Jr. reprised their roles in the 1998 sequel and the 2025 legacy sequel.

=== Television series ===
A television series based on the novel and part of the franchise was created by Sara Goodman for Amazon Prime Video in 2021. Like the films, the series is a slasher and follows a group of friends stalked by a brutal killer one year after covering up a car accident in which they killed someone. It was canceled by Amazon Prime the following year.
