= I Know What You Did Last Summer (franchise) =

Horror media franchise

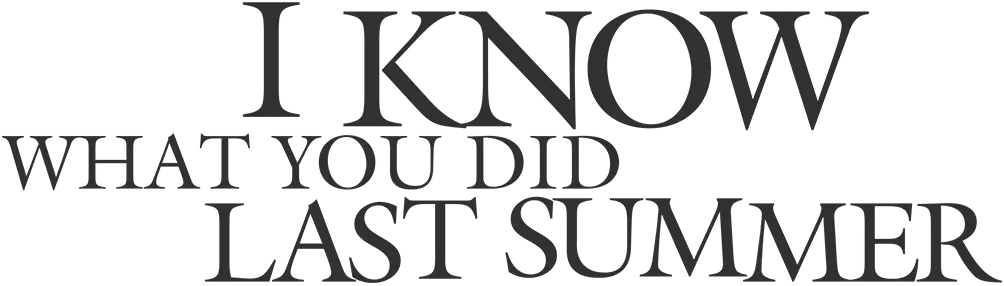
- Official franchise logo
- Created by: Lois Duncan
- Original work: I Know What You Did Last Summer (1973)
- Owner: Sony Pictures Entertainment
- Years: 1997–present

Print publications
- Novel: I Know What You Did Last Summer (1973)

Films and television
- Films: I Know What You Did Last Summer (1997); I Still Know What You Did Last Summer (1998); I Know What You Did Last Summer (2025)
- Television series: I Know What You Did Last Summer (2021)
- Direct-to-video: I'll Always Know What You Did Last Summer (2006)

Audio
- Soundtracks: I Know What You Did Last Summer: The Album (1997); I Know What You Did Last Summer (1997); I Still Know What You Did Last Summer (1998); I Know What You Did Last Summer (2021); I Know What You Did Last Summer (2025)

I Know What You Did Last Summer is an American horror media franchise owned by Sony Pictures Entertainment, consisting of four slasher films and one television series, and based on the 1973 novel by Lois Duncan.

The franchise follows various characters as they face a masked hook-wielding killer after they covered up an accident in which they supposedly killed someone. It started with a first installment written by Kevin Williamson, directed by Jim Gillespie, and released in 1997. The franchise includes two theatrical sequels, a direct-to-video standalone sequel, and a television series. Most of the films star Jennifer Love Hewitt as Julie James and Freddie Prinze Jr. as Ray Bronson.

Each installment of the franchise has received mixed reviews from critics, with the first film developing a cult following; collectively, they have grossed $274 million worldwide.

== Novel ==
In the fictional town of Silver Springs, near the Cibola National Forest, high school senior Julie James receives a note in the mail that reads, "I know what you did last summer." The previous summer, Julie, her then-boyfriend Ray Bronson, Ray's best friend Barry Cox, and Barry's girlfriend and Julie’s best friend Helen Rivers were driving home after partying in the mountains. They accidentally ran over and kill David Gregg, a young bicycling boy.

== Films ==
Films	U.S. release date	Director	Screenwriter(s)	Story by	Producer(s)
I Know What You Did Last Summer	October 17, 1997	Jim Gillespie	Kevin Williamson	Kevin Williamson	Erik Feig, Neal H. Moritz & Stokely Chaffin
I Still Know What You Did Last Summer	November 13, 1998	Danny Cannon	Trey Callaway	Trey Callaway	Erik Feig, Neal H. Moritz, Stokely Chaffin, Jose Ludlow & William S. Beasley
I'll Always Know What You Did Last Summer	August 15, 2006	Sylvain White	Michael D. Weiss	Michael D. Weiss	Erik Feig & Neal H. Moritz
I Know What You Did Last Summer	July 18, 2025	Jennifer Kaytin Robinson	Jennifer Kaytin Robinson & Sam Lansky	Jennifer Kaytin Robinson & Leah McKendrick	Neal H. Moritz

=== I Know What You Did Last Summer (1997) ===
After an accident on a winding road, four teens (Julie James, Helen Shivers, Barry Cox and Ray Bronson) make the fatal mistake of dumping their victim's body into the sea. But exactly one year later, a mysterious fisherman begins stalking the friends.

=== I Still Know What You Did Last Summer (1998) ===
The murderous fisherman with a hook stalks the two surviving teens, Julie James and Ray Bronson who left him for dead. Despite Julie's warnings, her friends (Karla Wilson, Tyrell Martin and Will Benson) do not believe her until it is too late, and the fisherman begins a second murder spree at a posh island resort in the Bahamas.

=== I'll Always Know What You Did Last Summer (2006) ===
A group of teenagers (Amber Williams, Colby Patterson, Zoe Warner and Roger Pack) in Colorado find themselves being stalked and killed one by one by a mysterious figure with a hook, exactly one year after they covered up a friend's accidental death.

=== I Know What You Did Last Summer (2025) ===
After five friends (Danica Richards, Ava Brucks, Milo Griffin, Teddy Spencer and Stevie Ward) inadvertently kill a man in a car accident, they cover up their involvement to avoid consequences. A year later, as they try to move on with their lives, a stalker sends them taunting messages about their crime. Realizing that the stalker is imitating a legendary serial killer, they seek help from Julie James and Ray Bronson, the survivors of the infamous Southport Massacre of 1997.

== Television ==
Series	Season	Episodes	First released	Last released	Showrunner(s)	Network(s)
I Know What You Did Last Summer	1	8	October 15, 2021	November 12, 2021	Sara Goodman	Amazon Prime Video

=== I Know What You Did Last Summer (2021) ===
A group of friends is stalked by a brutal killer one year after covering up a car accident in which they killed someone.

== Production ==
In 1973, Lois Duncan's novel I Know What You Did Last Summer was published. It was republished as a tie-in to the film in 1997 and once again in 2018 with some of its content modernized. The film adaptation re-envisioned the story of the novel as a violent slasher film, as opposed to the slow-burn mystery nature of the novel.

In 1997, director Mike Mendez pitched a sequel to I Know What You Did Last Summer that would have brought back Jennifer Love Hewitt and Freddie Prinze Jr. in a college setting. The following February, British filmmaker Danny Cannon was announced as director, unrelated to Mendez's idea. Matthew Settle, Brandy, Hewitt and Prinze Jr. joined the cast in March 1998, with Jennifer Esposito joining a month later. Filming locations included Los Angeles, where the Boston University and nightclub scenes were filmed, and the state of Jalisco, Mexico, where the Bahamas scenes were filmed; the El Tecuán Marina Resort served as the location for the fictional Tower Bay Hotel, and other interior scenes were also filmed at the El Tamarindo resort. Outdoor locations such as the Bahamas docks, the cemetery, the Southport Pier and highway scenes were filmed in the town of Costa Careyes, Jalisco.

In August 2000, it was reported that Columbia Pictures was developing a third I Know What You Did Last Summer film, to be written by Simon Barry. From the beginning, it was determined the film would not follow the characters from the prior entry, with the initial script involving a group of characters on an Outward Bound–style wilderness excursion who are hunted by an assailant. In July 2005, it was reported Sony Pictures was moving forward with the working title I Know What You Did Last Summer 3 with Michael D. Weiss now set to write the film, which would follow a group of teenagers who believe they accidentally killed a man only to discover that their would-be victim is now out to kill them. Like the earlier Barry draft, this incarnation was also independent of the prior entries. Sony did consider giving Weiss's film a theatrical release before ultimately releasing it direct-to-video as I'll Always Know What You Did Last Summer.

In September 2014, Sony Pictures revealed plans to remake the first film, with Mike Flanagan and Jeff Howard writing the script. The film was a high priority and was initially set for release in 2016. The project required an estimated budget of $15–20 million. Flanagan confirmed that his new iteration of the franchise would be a reboot and not include elements of the 1973 novel nor of the 1997 feature film. The project was ultimately never made and was subsequently canceled.

In July 2019, Amazon Studios acquired the rights to develop a television series adaptation of the franchise with Neal H. Moritz and James Wan producing. Craig Macneill directed the pilot episode, written by Sara Goodman. Madison Iseman, Brianne Tju, Ezekiel Goodman, Ashley Moore, Sebastian Amoruso, Fiona Rene, Cassie Beck, Brooke Bloom, and Bill Heck star in the series. It premiered on October 15, 2021.

In February 2023, after years of remaining in development hell, a legacy sequel film was announced to be in development with Jennifer Love Hewitt and Freddie Prinze Jr. in negotiations to reprise their respective roles. Prinze Jr. and Hewitt were confirmed as part of the cast in September and December 2024, respectively, and the film was released on July 18, 2025.

== Recurring cast and characters ==
List indicators

This section includes characters who will appear or have appeared in more than two films in the series.

- An empty grey cell indicates the character was not in the film, or that the character's official presence has not yet been confirmed.
- ^{C} indicates a cameo role.

Characters	Films			
Characters	I Know What You Did Last Summer	I Still Know What You Did Last Summer	I'll Always Know What You Did Last Summer	I Know What You Did Last Summer
Characters	1997	1998	2006	2025
Benjamin "Ben" Willis The Fisherman	Muse Watson	Muse Watson	Don Shanks	
Julie James	Jennifer Love Hewitt	Jennifer Love Hewitt		Jennifer Love Hewitt
Ray Bronson The Fisherman	Freddie Prinze Jr.	Freddie Prinze Jr.		Freddie Prinze Jr.
Helen Shivers	Sarah Michelle Gellar			Sarah Michelle Gellar^{C}
Karla Wilson		Brandy Norwood		Brandy Norwood^{C}

== Additional crew and production details ==
Film / Television	Crew/detail					
Film / Television	Composer(s)	Cinematographer(s)	Editor(s)	Production companies	Distributing companies	Running time
I Know What You Did Last Summer (1997)	John Debney	Denis Crossan	Steve Mirkovich	Mandalay Entertainment	Columbia Pictures	1 hr 41 mins
I Still Know What You Did Last Summer	John Frizzell	Vernon Layton	Peck Prior	Mandalay Entertainment	Columbia Pictures	1 hr 40 mins
I'll Always Know What You Did Last Summer	Justin Burnett	Stephen M. Katz	David Checel	Mandalay Pictures, Original Film, Destination Films	Sony Pictures Home Entertainment	1 hr 32 mins
I Know What You Did Last Summer (2021)	Drum & Lace, & Ian Hultquist	Anka Malatynska & Shawn Mauer	Ray Daniels, Trevor Baker, Jo Francis, Monica Daniel, Marc Pollon, & Christopher M. Meagher	Off Center Inc., Original Film, Mandalay Television, Atomic Monster, Amazon Studios, Sony Pictures Television Studios	Amazon Prime Video	6 hrs 20 mins (8 episodes)
I Know What You Did Last Summer (2025)	Chanda Dancy	Elisha Christian	Saira Haider	Columbia Pictures, Screen Gems, Original Film	Sony Pictures Releasing	1 hr 51 mins

== Reception ==
=== Box office performance ===
Film	Box office gross			Budget	Reference
Film	North America	Other territories	Worldwide	Budget	Reference
I Know What You Did Last Summer (1997)	$72,586,134	$53,000,000	$125,586,134	$17 million	
I Still Know What You Did Last Summer	$40,002,112	$44,000,000	$84,002,112	$24 million	
I Know What You Did Last Summer (2025)	$32,200,000	$32,500,000	$64,700,000	$18 million	
Total	$144,788,246	$129,500,000	$274,288,246	$59,000,000	

=== Critical and public response ===
Title	Rotten Tomatoes	Metacritic	CinemaScore
I Know What You Did Last Summer (1997)	46% (116 reviews)	52 (17 reviews)	B−
I Still Know What You Did Last Summer	10% (61 reviews)	21 (19 reviews)	B
I'll Always Know What You Did Last Summer	0% (7 reviews)	—N/a	—N/a
I Know What You Did Last Summer (TV series)	41% (46 reviews)	45 (4 reviews)	—N/a
I Know What You Did Last Summer (2025)	36% (196 reviews)	42 (32 reviews)	C+

== Music ==
Title	U.S. release date	Length	Performed by	Label
I Know What You Did Last Summer: The Album	October 7, 1997	53:40	Various Artists	Columbia Records
I Know What You Did Last Summer: Original Motion Picture Score	October 7, 1997	50:44	John Debney	Super Tracks
I Still Know What You Did Last Summer: Music from the Motion Picture	November 17, 1998	50:57	Various Artists	143 Records and Warner Bros. Records
I Know What You Did Last Summer: Music from the Amazon Series	October 15, 2021	56:44	Drum, Lace & Ian Hultquist	Madison Gate Records
I Know What You Did Last Summer: Original Motion Picture Soundtrack	July 18, 2025	58:35	Chanda Dancy	Milan Records

== Video games ==
The Fisherman has made appearances as a playable character in the Call of Duty franchise with the battle royale game Call of Duty: Warzone and the first-person shooter game Call of Duty: Black Ops 6.
