= I Know What You Did Last Summer =

1997 American slasher film

- Theatrical release poster
- Directed by: Jim Gillespie
- Screenplay by: Kevin Williamson
- Based on: I Know What You Did Last Summer by Lois Duncan
- Produced by: Neal H. Moritz; Erik Feig; Stokely Chaffin
- Starring: Jennifer Love Hewitt; Sarah Michelle Gellar; Ryan Phillippe; Freddie Prinze Jr.; Johnny Galecki; Bridgette Wilson
- Cinematography: Denis Crossan
- Edited by: Steve Mirkovich
- Music by: John Debney
- Production company: Mandalay Entertainment
- Distributed by: Columbia Pictures
- Release date: October 17, 1997
- Running time: 101 minutes
- Country: United States
- Language: English
- Budget: $17 million
- Box office: $125.3 million

I Know What You Did Last Summer is a 1997 American slasher film starring Jennifer Love Hewitt, Sarah Michelle Gellar, Ryan Phillippe, and Freddie Prinze Jr. as four teenage friends who are stalked by a hook-wielding killer one year after covering up a car accident in which they supposedly killed a man. It was directed by Jim Gillespie and written by Kevin Williamson, who adapted the 1973 novel by Lois Duncan. It is the first installment in the I Know What You Did Last Summer film series.

Williamson was approached to adapt Duncan's source novel by producer Erik Feig. Where Scream, released the previous year, contained prominent elements of satire and self-referentiality, Williamson's script for I Know What You Did Last Summer reworked the novel's central plot to resemble a straightforward 1980s-era slasher film.

I Know What You Did Last Summer was released theatrically in the United States on October 17, 1997, by Columbia Pictures. It received a mixed reception from critics and grossed $125.3 million on a budget of $17 million. The film was parodied in Scary Movie (2000) and is frequently referenced in popular culture, as well as being credited alongside Scream with revitalizing the slasher genre in the 1990s.

The film was followed by three sequels – I Still Know What You Did Last Summer (1998), I'll Always Know What You Did Last Summer (2006) and I Know What You Did Last Summer (2025) – and a 2021 television series.

== Plot ==
On July 4, 1996, in Southport, North Carolina, Julie James and her friends Ray Bronson, Helen Shivers, and Barry Cox drive to the beach while celebrating Helen's victory at the beauty pageant. On the way back, Barry's drunken antics cause Ray to accidentally hit a pedestrian, assuming they killed him. Julie's friend Max passes by on the road, and they hide their crime from him to buy more time to decide what to do. Barry and Helen try to dump the body in the water, but the pedestrian wakes up and grabs Helen. Barry pushes him into the water, and the group makes a pact to never discuss what happened.

One year later, Julie returns home from college for the summer. The friends have gone their separate ways, with none of them pursuing their dreams, due to trauma from the incident. Julie receives a letter stating, "I know what you did last summer!" She and Helen take the note to Barry, who suspects Max is pulling a stunt on them. Julie meets Ray, who now works as a fisherman. Max is killed by a figure in a fisherman slicker wielding a hook. That night, Barry is ambushed by the killer, who steals his car, hitting Barry, but refraining from killing him.

Julie researches newspaper articles, believing that the man they ran over was a local named David Egan. Helen and Julie meet David's sister, Missy, at her home, under the guise that their car broke down. Missy explains that a friend of David's named Billy Blue visited her to pay his respects. That night, the killer sneaks into Helen's house and cuts off her hair while she sleeps.

The following morning, Julie finds Max's corpse wearing Barry's stolen jacket and covered in crabs in the trunk of her car. When she brings the others to see it, the body has been removed. Julie, Helen and Barry confront Ray, who claims to also have received a letter. Julie goes back to visit Missy, while Barry and Helen participate in the 4th of July parade. Missy reveals that David allegedly committed suicide out of guilt for the death of his girlfriend, Susie Willis, in a car accident and shows David's suicide note. As the writing matches that of the note she received, Julie realizes it was not a suicide note, but a death threat. Julie realizes the man she and her friends struck in the hit-and-run was not David Egan.

At the Croaker Beauty Pageant, Helen witnesses Barry being murdered on the balcony, but finds no sign of the killer, or Barry. The police officer escorting her home is murdered by the killer. Helen runs to her family's store, where the killer murders her sister, Elsa. She escapes and runs toward the street, but the killer slashes her to death.

Julie finds an article mentioning Susie's father, Ben Willis, and realizes Ben was the man they had run over a year earlier, moments after he killed David to avenge his daughter. She goes to tell Ray but notices Ray's boat is called Billy Blue. A fisherman knocks Ray unconscious, inviting Julie to hide on his boat. On the boat, she finds photos and articles about her and her friends and pictures of Susie. The boat leaves the docks, and the fisherman is revealed to be Ben Willis, targeting them in revenge for leaving him for dead.

Ben chases Julie below deck, where she uncovers the bodies of Helen and Barry in the icebox. Ray awakens and goes to rescue Julie. He ultimately uses the rigging to sever Ben's hand and send him overboard. He explains that he posed as David's friend and visited Missy out of guilt. The couple reconciles, relieved not to have actually killed anyone after all.

One year later, Julie is in college in Boston. As she enters the shower, Julie notices the words I still know written in the steam on the shower door right before a dark figure crashes through it.

== Cast ==
- Jennifer Love Hewitt as Julie James
- Sarah Michelle Gellar as Helen Shivers
- Ryan Phillippe as Barry Cox
- Freddie Prinze Jr. as Ray Bronson
- Johnny Galecki as Max Neurick
- Bridgette Wilson as Elsa Shivers
- Anne Heche as Melissa "Missy" Egan
- Muse Watson as Benjamin "Ben" Willis / the Fisherman
- Stuart Greer as officer

== Production ==
=== Development and writing ===
==== Background ====
Written by Kevin Williamson, the screenplay for I Know What You Did Last Summer was rushed into production—having previously been disregarded—by Columbia Pictures upon the success of the Williamson-written Scream, released in 1996.

The film is based on the 1973 novel by Lois Duncan, a youth-oriented suspense novel about four teenagers who are involved in a hit-and-run accident involving a young boy.

==== Development ====
Producer Erik Feig pitched the idea of a screen adaptation to Mandalay Entertainment, and subsequently appointed Williamson to retool the core elements of Duncan's novel, rendering a screenplay more akin to a 1980s slasher film. Inspired by his father, who had been a commercial fisherman, Williamson changed the setting of the novel to a small fishing village, and made the villain a hook-wielding fisherman.

The killer's arming of himself with a hook is a reference to the urban legend "the Hook", which the four main characters recount at the beginning of the film around a campfire. According to Williamson, he wrote the scene as a way of indicating what was to come: "Basically what I was doing was I was setting the framework to say, 'All right, audience: That's that legend. Now here's a new one.'" Unlike Williamson's screenplay for the film's contemporary, Scream, which incorporated satire of the slasher film, I Know What You Did Last Summer was written more as a straightforward slasher film. Gillespie commented in 2008: "The joy of this film for me as a filmmaker was in taking [the] elements that we've seen before, and saying to the audience: 'Here's something you've seen before'—knowing that they're saying 'We've seen this before'—and still getting them to jump." Gillespie also claimed that he felt Williamson's screenplay did not resemble a "slasher horror movie" and that he saw it rather as simply "a really good story" with a morality tale embedded within it.

=== Pre-production ===
According to producer Stokely Chaffin, the producers sought out actors who were "beautiful, but likable". Director Gillespie recalled that, though he had been unfamiliar with the screenplay's source material, that "roughly 60 to 65%" of the young women auditioning had read the novel as children. Jennifer Love Hewitt, who at the time was mainly known for her role on the television series Party of Five, was cast in the lead of Julie James based on her "ability to project vulnerability", which the producers, director Gillespie and writer Williamson unanimously agreed upon. Initially, Hewitt was considered for the role of Helen. Melissa Joan Hart was offered a role, but she turned it down, because she felt that the film was a rip-off of Scream. For the role of Barry, the crew had envisioned an actor with a "6 ft 2 in (1.88 m) quarterback" appearance, as the character had been written as an intimidating figure. Ryan Phillippe was ultimately cast in the part based on his audition, despite the fact that he was not as physically tall as the script had called for. Director Gillespie chose Freddie Prinze Jr. for the role of Ray, because he felt Prinze himself had an "everyman" quality much like the character.

Sarah Michelle Gellar was the last of the lead performers to be cast in the role of Helen. Like Hewitt, Gellar was also known to American audiences at the time for her roles in television. Gillespie commented on casting Gellar: "I wanted an actress that had a warmth to her, but could still come off as being a bitch." For the supporting role of Missy, Gillespie sought an actress with significant screen presence, as the character, despite appearing in only two scenes, is central to several major plot points. Anne Heche was cast in the role, which she recalled as being two days' worth of work that required her to "be scary".

=== Filming ===
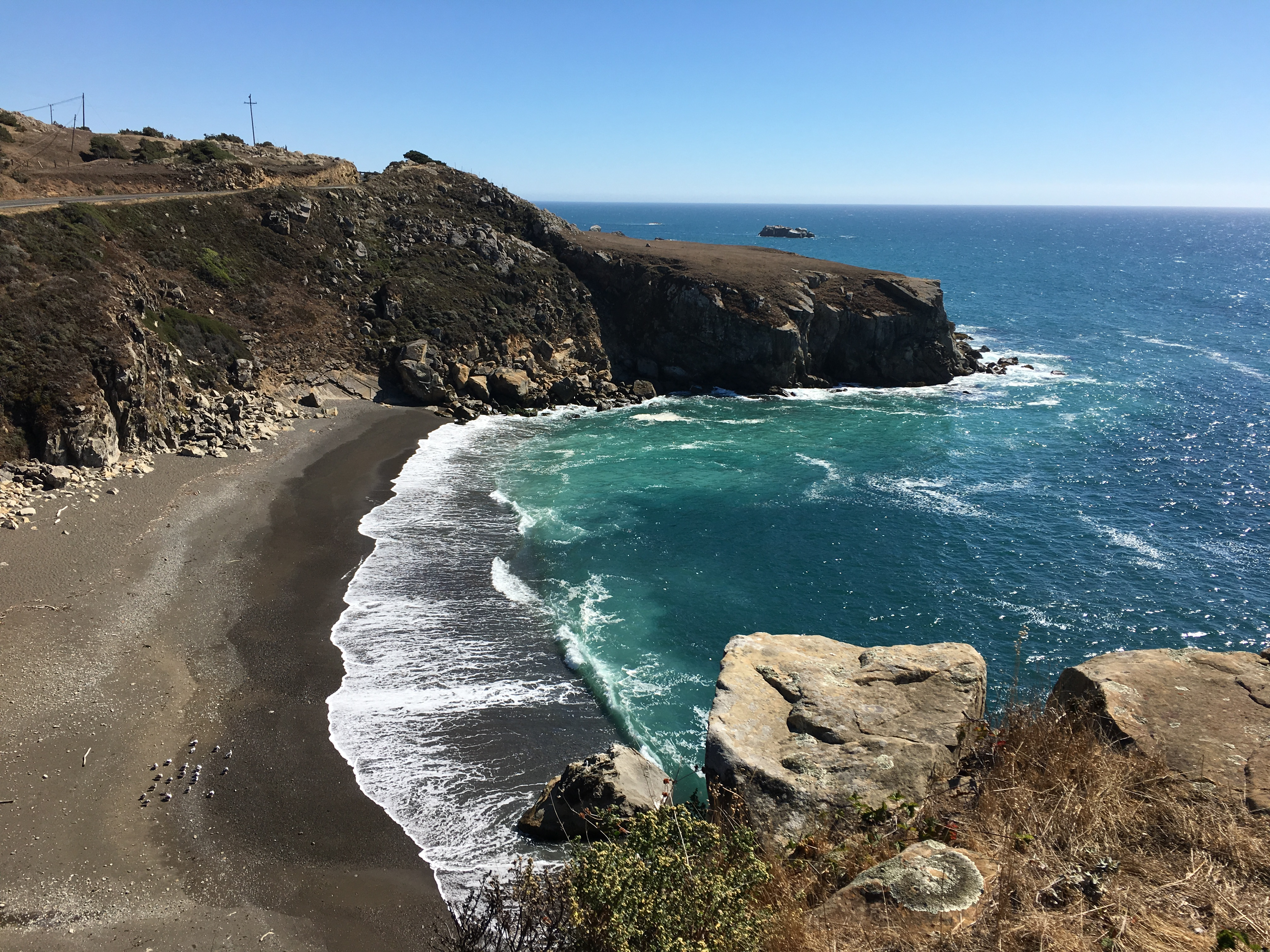
The cliff and rock shown at the beginning of the film, shot at Kolmer Gulch near Jenner, California

Scottish director Jim Gillespie was hired to direct the film after being suggested by writer Williamson. Hewitt would later state in 2008 that Gillespie was to date her "favorite director [she's] ever worked with." Principal photography began on March 31, 1997, and took place over a period of ten weeks throughout the late spring-early summer of 1997. (Note: In his 1998 audio commentary for the film, Gillespie notes that the California-shot scenes were filmed in June 1997, and that the shoot lasted ten weeks. According to Adam Rockoff, principal photography commenced on March 31, 1997.) Approximately seven weeks of the ten-week shoot took place at night, which Gillespie says was difficult for the cast and crew, and also created commotion in primary small-town locations in which they shot. Gillespie devised a color scheme with cinematographer Denis Crossan which was marked by heavy blues throughout and a notable lack of bright colors.

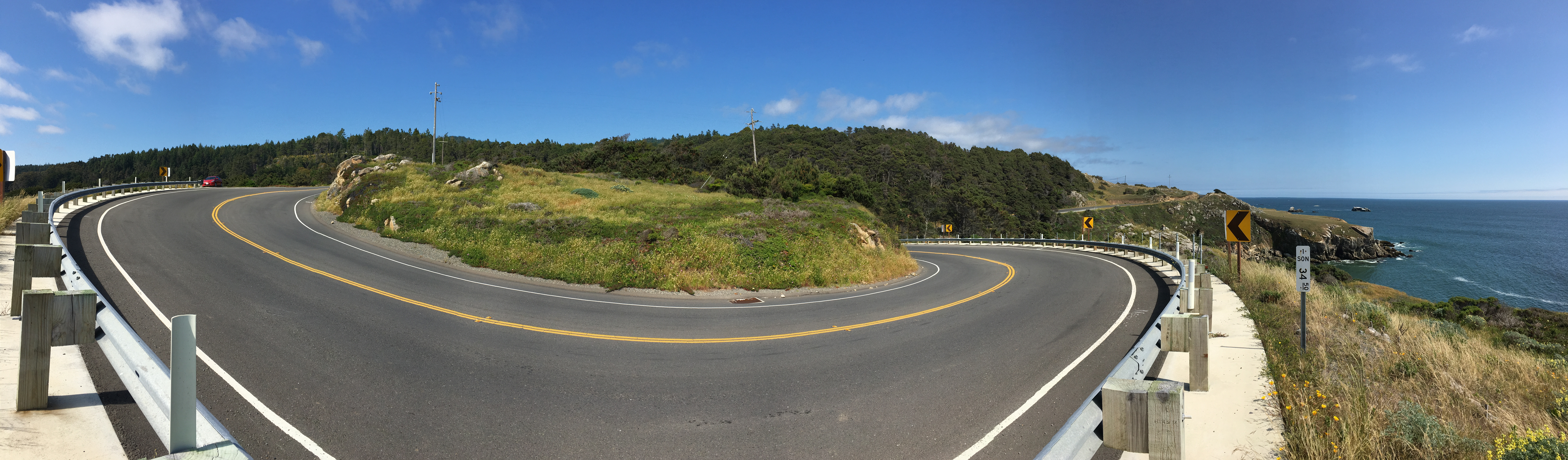
The blind curve where the car accident occurs early in the film, shot at Kolmer Gulch near Jenner, California

For the beginning of the film, coastal areas of Sonoma County, California stood in for North Carolina, where the film is set. The opening shots of the sun setting on a rugged coast were filmed at Kolmer Gulch, just north of the town of Jenner, on Highway 1. The car crash scene was also filmed on Highway 1 in the same area. The scene in which the four friends are seated around a campfire on the beach next to a wrecked boat was inspired by a painting Gillespie had seen in a reference book; to achieve the image, the art department purchased an old boat in Bodega Bay, cut it in half and placed it at the beach location.

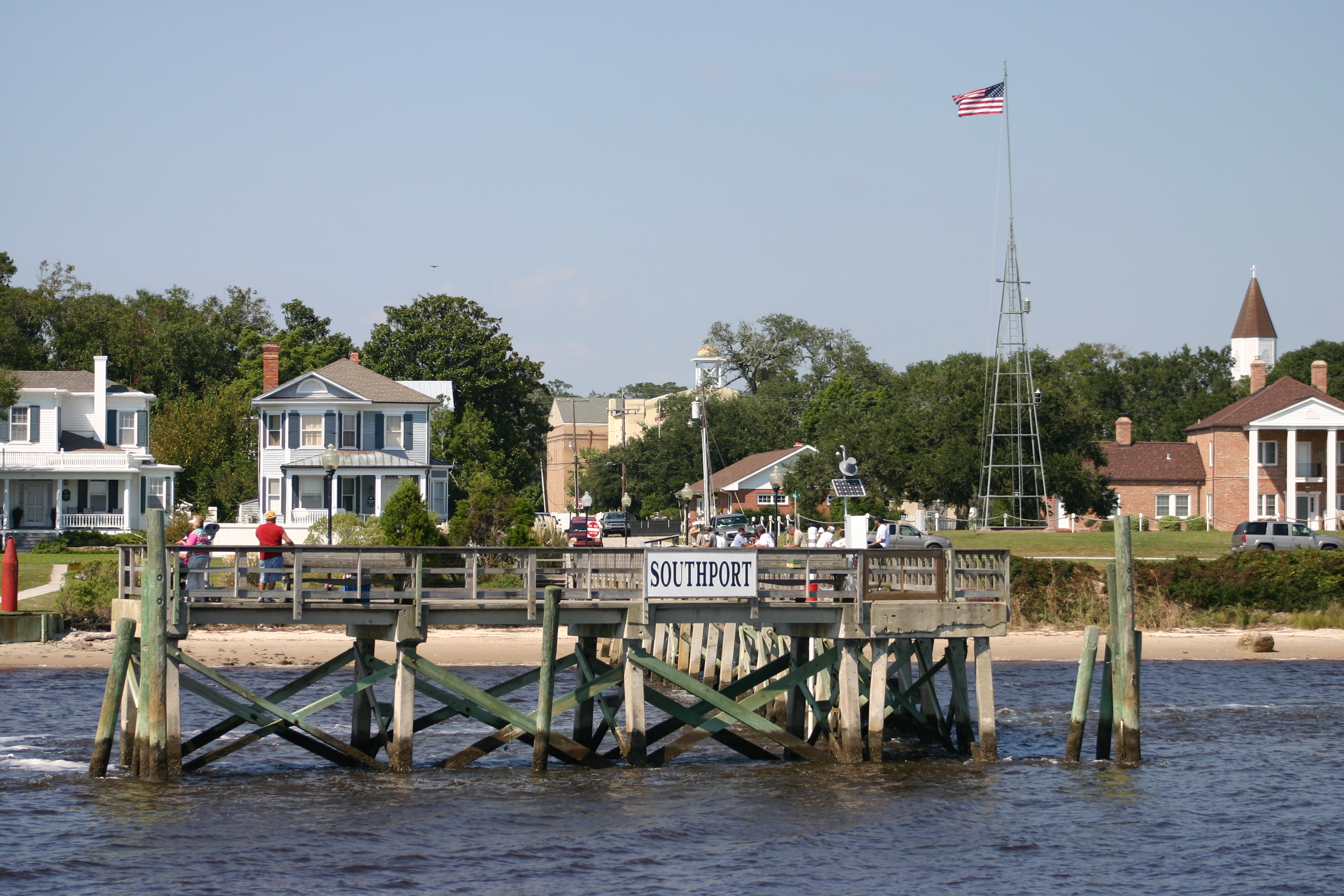
The majority of the film was set in Southport, North Carolina

The remaining scenes were filmed primarily around the town of Southport, North Carolina. Specific sites included the Amuzu Theater, where the beauty pageant is held, the Old Yacht Basin and Southport Fish Company. Julie's house is on Short Street just north of Southport Marina. The daytime sequences shot on the marina show multiple vessels traversing the water; though real vessels, the boat traffic was orchestrated by a marine traffic coordinator to make the waterway appear lively. The Shiver's Department Store setting in the film was discovered on location in Southport by director Gillespie, who was so impressed by the location that he reworked elements of the script in order to incorporate it into the film; it eventually became the primary setting for Helen's extended chase sequence with the killer. The exterior sequences of Julie's Boston college campus were in fact shot at Duke University, while the hospital sequence was filmed at Southport's Dosher Memorial Hospital in an unused wing of the hospital.

There is a climactic scene where Jennifer Love Hewitt's character walks into the middle of the street and screams to the killer "What are you waiting for?!" According to Hewitt, that scene was conceived and directed by a child who won a contest to "come on and create a moment for the movie". In an interview with Us Weekly, she stated that she disliked the idea but still went through with it, and noted that the scene "became the biggest part of the movie" and that ultimately it was "a great idea".

The final sequence on the boat was shot on an actual water-bound vessel on the Cape Fear River, which proved difficult for the actors and crew. According to Gillespie, the filmmakers nearly lost the boat while attempting to dock it due to the volatile waters, after which they were forced to leave and shoot other footage until the following day.

=== Post-production ===
Gillespie chose to film virtually no onscreen blood as he did not want the film to be overly gratuitous in terms of violence. The scene in which Elsa has her throat slashed while standing against a glass door had originally been shot from behind without any blood appearing on the glass. However, producer Feig worried that the scene appeared "medically impossible" after which Gillespie re-shot it (post-principal photography) with a visual effect of blood spattering across the glass. Upon test screenings of the film, Gillespie and the producers decided that a death sequence needed to occur earlier in the film to establish a sense of legitimate danger for the main characters. The scene in which Max is murdered in the crab factory was subsequently filmed and implemented into the final cut to achieve this (in the original script, his character was not killed).

The original ending of the film featured a sequence in which Julie receives an email reading: "I Still Know". This ending was scrapped for the more dramatic ending featured in the final cut of the film, in which Julie finds the same message scrawled on a shower stall just before the killer comes crashing through the glass. This footage was also shot after principal photography, on a soundstage next-door to where Hewitt was filming Party of Five.

== Music ==
The film produced two soundtracks. One of them featured the score composed by John Debney, while the other contained various rock songs found in the film.

I Know What You Did Last Summer: Original Motion Picture Score

Film score by John Debney
- Released: October 7, 1997
- Recorded: 1997
- Genre: Film score
- Length: 50:44
- Label: Super Tracks

I Know What You Did Last Summer: The Album

Soundtrack album by various artists
- Released: October 7, 1997
- Recorded: 1993 – June 1997
- Genres: Alternative rock, alternative metal
- Length: 51:14
- Label: Columbia

I Know What You Did Last Summer: The Album
No.	Title	Writer(s)	Producer(s)	Length
1.	"Hush" (performed by Kula Shaker)	Joe South	Crispian Mills; Stephne Harris	2:55
2.	"Summer Breeze" (performed by Type O Negative)	Jim Seals; Dash Crofts	Josh Silver; Peter Steele	4:57
3.	"D.U.I." (performed by The Offspring)	Bryan Holland; Kevin Wasserman	Dave Jerden	2:26
4.	"Kid" (performed by Green Apple Quick Step)	Green Apple Quick Step	Matt Wallace	3:17
5.	"This Ain't the Summer of Love" (performed by L7)	Albert Bouchard; Donald Waller; Murray Krugman	L7	3:09
6.	"Losin' It" (performed by Soul Asylum)	Dave Pirner	Matt Hyde	3:01
7.	"Hey Bulldog" (performed by Toad the Wet Sprocket)	John Lennon; Paul McCartney	Gavin MacKillop; Toad the Wet Sprocket	2:31
8.	"My Baby's Got the Strangest Ways" (performed by Southern Culture on the Skids)	Rick Miller	Mark Williams; Southern Culture on the Skids	3:59
9.	"Waterfall" (performed by The Din Pedals)	The Din Pedals	Stephen Stewart Short	3:47
10.	"Clumsy" (performed by Our Lady Peace)	Raine Maida; Arnold Lanni	Arnold Lanni	4:27
11.	"One Hundred Days" (performed by Flick)	Oran Thornton; Trevor Thornton	Joe Baldridge	3:40
12.	"Great Life" (performed by Goatboy)	Goatboy	Goatboy; Roger Greenawalt	3:50
13.	"2Wicky" (performed by Hooverphonic)	Alex Callier; Raymond Geerts; Burt Bacharach; Hal David; Pierre Henry	Hooverphonic	4:44
14.	"Don't Mean Anything" (performed by Adam Cohen)	Adam Cohen; Phil Roy	Steve Lindsey	3:43
15.	"Proud" (performed by Korn)	Korn	Ross Robinson	3:17

Sample credits

- "2Wicky" contains samples from:
  - "Walk on By", written by Burt Bacharach and Hal David, and performed by Isaac Hayes.
  - "Le voile d'Orphee", written and performed by Pierre Henry.

Additional songs featured in the film (but not on a soundtrack):

- "Forgotten Too" by Ugly Beauty
- "Wake Up Call" by The Mighty Mighty Bosstones
- "Where Did You Sleep Last Night" by Lead Belly
- "You're a Grand Old Flag" by George M. Cohan
- "Beautiful Girl" by Bing Crosby
- "Free" by Ultra Naté

== Release ==
=== Marketing and lawsuit ===
In anticipation of its release, distributor Columbia Pictures and Mandalay Entertainment began a summer marketing campaign that presented the film as being "From the creator of Scream", meaning writer Kevin Williamson. Miramax Films subsequently filed a lawsuit against Columbia and Mandalay, arguing the statement was misleading as it suggested that Wes Craven, the director of Scream, had been involved with the production. The week following the film's theatrical release, a federal judge awarded Miramax an injunction requiring that Columbia and Mandalay remove the claim from their advertising. (Williamson himself had already requested its removal by this point after spotting it on a theater poster.) Miramax won the lawsuit against Columbia and Mandalay during a March 1998 hearing. In a press release, executive Bob Weinstein noted plans to "vigorously pursue" damage claims against Columbia Pictures.

=== Home media ===
The film was released on VHS and DVD by Columbia TriStar Home Video in the United States on June 16, 1998. Special features included a theatrical trailer and the filmmaker's commentary.

Sony Pictures Home Entertainment released the film on Blu-ray for the first time on July 22, 2008, with additional special features including the director's short film, Joyride. On September 30, 2014, Mill Creek Entertainment re-released the film on Blu-ray as a budget disc, featuring the film alone with no bonus materials. On September 27, 2022, Sony Pictures Home Entertainment re-released the film for the first time on Ultra HD Blu-ray for its 25th anniversary.

== Reception ==
=== Box office ===
I Know What You Did Last Summer opened theatrically in North America on October 17, 1997. The film was made on a $17 million budget, and grossed $15,818,645 in 2,524 theaters in its opening weekend in the United States and Canada, ranking number one; it remained in the number one position for an additional two weekends. By the end of its theatrical run in December 1997, it had grossed $72,586,134 in the U.S. and Canada and $53 million in other countries for a worldwide total of $126 million.

According to data compiled by Box Office Mojo, I Know What You Did Last Summer is the seventh highest-grossing slasher film as of 2021.

In retrospect, Jim Gillespie said: "It was meant to be kind of a stand-alone revisit of those classic '80s horror films. It worked! The movie was number one three weeks in a row. It just clicked with the audience. The title clicked and everything just seemed to work. Third week was Halloween weekend and it was number one in its third week. I couldn't believe it stuck there for three weeks."

=== Critical response ===
On review aggregator Rotten Tomatoes, the film holds an approval rating of 47% based on 118 reviews, with an average rating of 5.40/10. The site's critics consensus reads: "A by-the-numbers slasher that arrived a decade too late, the mostly tedious I Know What You Did Last Summer will likely only hook diehard fans of the genre." On Metacritic, it has a weighted average score of 52 out of 100 based on reviews from 17 critics, indicating "mixed or average" reviews. Audiences polled by CinemaScore gave the film an average grade of B− on an A+ to F scale.

The film drew both positive and negative comparisons to Scream, also written by Williamson. Mick LaSalle considered the movie inferior to its predecessor. Richard Harrington, on the other hand, cited I Know What You Did Last Summer as superior to Scream; he described the newer picture as "... a smart and sharply-drawn genre-film with a moral center, and with a solid cast of young actors to hold it." Derek Elley of Variety was also enthusiastic, calling the film a "polished genre piece with superior fright elements that should perform at better-than-average theatrical levels." Roger Ebert gave the movie one of four stars and wrote that "The best shot in this film is the first one. Not a good sign." Entertainment Weekly praised Jennifer Love Hewitt's performance, noting that she "knows how to scream with soul".

Lawrence Van Gelder of The New York Times wrote of the picture: "This isn't real life. It's the grand guignol of I Know What You Did Last Summer, laying its claim to succeed Scream as a high-grossing and blood-drenched date-night crowd-pleaser. And why shouldn't it?" James Kendrick of the Q Network wrote that "Williamson's characters are all generic types; but they're still believable as people, and they react realistically according to the situations." Kendrick added that the film was "head and shoulders above earlier 'dead teenager' movies".

TV Guide's Maitland McDonagh awarded the movie two out of five stars, noting: "Screenwriter Kevin Williamson takes a step backward and writes the kind of movie Scream mocks. You can see him now, soaking up videos of Friday the 13th and Halloween—not to mention the lesser likes of He Knows You're Alone, Terror Train and My Bloody Valentine—and saying, 'I can do that!' And boy, does he ever."

Critic James Berardinelli credited both I Know What You Did Last Summer and Scream with igniting a new boom of slasher films, adding: "There is one minor aspect of the plot that elevates I Know What You Did Last Summer above the level of a typical '80s slasher flick -- it has an interesting subtext. I'm referring to the way the lives and friendships of these four individuals crumble in the wake of their accident. Guilt, confusion and doubt build in them until they can no longer stand to be with each other or look at themselves in the mirror. Sadly, this potentially-fascinating element of the movie is dismissed quickly to facilitate a higher body count. And, as I said before, a few extra deaths can only make a slasher movie better, right?"

Movie historian Leonard Maltin gave the film 2 out of a possible 4 stars; he described it as "...Too routine to succeed overall...Despite being based on a young-adult novel, this is absolutely not for kids. Still, it's a classic compared to the sequel."

Motion picture scholar Adam Rockoff notes in his book Going to Pieces: The Rise and Fall of the Slasher Film, 1978–1986 that, at the time of its release, many critics branded I Know What You Did Last Summer as an imitation of Scream. However, he contends that it is a "much different film", despite both screenplays being penned by the same writer:

Whereas Scream relied heavily on self-conscious references and its pop culture veneer, Last Summer was a throwback to the slasher films of the early '80s. While, like Scream, it employed the services of a group of young, sexy and almost impossibly good-looking actors, Last Summer played its horror straight. Those looking for a good old-fashioned slasher film were pleasantly surprised.

Lois Duncan, the author of the original novel, heavily criticized the film adaptation; she stated in a 2002 interview she was "appalled" her story was turned into a slasher film.

=== Accolades ===
Year	Ceremony	Category	Nominee	Result
1997	ASCAP Award	Top Box Office Films	John Debney	Won
1998	Saturn Award	Best Horror Film	I Know What You Did Last Summer	Nominated
1998	Blockbuster Entertainment Award	Favorite Female Newcomer	Jennifer Love Hewitt	Won
1998	Blockbuster Entertainment Award	Favorite Actress	Jennifer Love Hewitt	Won
1998	Blockbuster Entertainment Award	Favorite Supporting Actress – Horror	Sarah Michelle Gellar	Won
1998	Blockbuster Entertainment Award	Favorite Actor – Horror	Freddie Prinze Jr.	Nominated
1998	Blockbuster Entertainment Award	Favorite Actress – Horror	Jennifer Love Hewitt	Nominated
1998	Blockbuster Entertainment Award	Favorite Supporting Actor	Ryan Phillippe	Nominated
1998	International Horror Guild Award	Best Movie	I Know What You Did Last Summer	Nominated
1998	MTV Movie Awards	Best Breakthrough Performance	Sarah Michelle Gellar	Nominated
1998	Young Artist Award	Best Performance in a Feature Film – Leading Young Actress	Jennifer Love Hewitt	Nominated

== Franchise ==
=== Sequels ===
A sequel titled I Still Know What You Did Last Summer was released in 1998, with a direct-to-video film, I'll Always Know What You Did Last Summer, released in 2006. In the first sequel, Hewitt, Prinze Jr. and Watson reprised their roles. The third film has very little relation to the first two, other than the premise, the villain and the producers. It featured new characters and a different setting.

In February 2023, a legacy sequel was announced to be in development, with Jennifer Love Hewitt and Freddie Prinze Jr. in negotiations to reprise their respective roles. Jennifer Kaytin Robinson was selected to direct the film from a script written by Leah McKendrick, based on an idea by Robinson and McKendrick. Neal H. Moritz would serve as producer. The plot is said to be similar in approach to Scream (2022), in which characters from the original film are included in a story featuring a younger cast. The film was released in July 2025.

=== Remake ===
This film was unofficially remade in India by Anil V. Kumar as Kucch To Hai (2003), starring Tusshar Kapoor. However, in an interview to Hindustan Times, Kapoor denied that the makers of his film copied this particular film.

In September 2014, Sony Pictures revealed plans to remake the film, with Mike Flanagan and Jeff Howard writing the script. The film was a high priority and was initially set for release in 2014. Further, the new direction and scope of the film would need an estimated budget of $15 to 20 million. Flanagan confirmed that this new iteration of the franchise would not include elements of the 1973 novel (the antagonist being a central character) nor of the 1997 feature film (fisherman Ben Willis and the four protagonists Julie James, Helen Shivers, Barry Cox and Ray Bronson). The project was ultimately never made and was subsequently canceled.

=== Television series ===
A television series adaptation of the novel was released in October 2021, with Neal H. Moritz and James Wan producing and Shay Hatten writing the pilot. Amazon ordered a straight-to-series order in October 2020.

== In popular culture ==
The Dawson's Creek season one episode "The Scare" spoofs I Know What You Did Last Summer alongside Scream, all written by Williamson. The episode opens with the characters Dawson and Joey viewing the former.

I Know What You Did Last Summer has been referenced in various films and television series, and its central plot was parodied at length in the spoof films Scary Movie and Shriek If You Know What I Did Last Friday the 13th (both 2000).

The teen drama Popular spoofed the film in the season two episode "I Know What You Did Last Spring Break."

It was also spoofed by Anthony Horowitz in the Diamond Brothers novella, I Know What You Did Last Wednesday (2002) and later in The Simpsons episodes "Treehouse of Horror X" as "I Know What You Diddily-Iddily-Did", with Ned Flanders as the killer, and "Treehouse of Horror Presents: The Revengening", with Apu Nahasapeemapetilon as the killer.

In Boy Meets World, the episode titled "And Then There Was Shawn" was conceived as a parody of then-recent horror films Scream and I Know What You Did Last Summer. Jennifer Love Hewitt also appeared in the episode.

== Works cited ==
- Fahy, Thomas, ed. (2010). The Philosophy of Horror. University Press of Kentucky. ISBN 978-0-813-13954-8.
- Gillespie, Jim; Mirkovich, Steve (1998). I Know What You Did Last Summer: Audio commentary (DVD). Columbia TriStar Home Video.
- Harper, Jim (2004). Legacy of Blood: A Comprehensive Guide to Slasher Movies. Critical Vision. ISBN 978-1-900-48639-2.
- Murphy, Bernice (2009). The Suburban Gothic in American Popular Culture. Palgrave Macmillan. ISBN 978-0-230-21810-9.
- Rockoff, Adam (2016). Going to Pieces: The Rise and Fall of the Slasher Film, 1978–1986. Macmillan. ISBN 978-0-786-49192-6.
- Shary, Timothy (2012). Teen Movies: American Youth on Screen. Columbia University Press. ISBN 978-0-231-50160-6.
