= I Know What You Did Last Summer (2025 film) =

American slasher film

- Theatrical release poster
- Directed by: Jennifer Kaytin Robinson
- Screenplay by: Sam Lansky; Jennifer Kaytin Robinson
- Story by: Leah McKendrick; Jennifer Kaytin Robinson
- Based on: Characters by Lois Duncan
- Produced by: Neal H. Moritz
- Starring: Madelyn Cline; Chase Sui Wonders; Jonah Hauer-King; Tyriq Withers; Sarah Pidgeon; Billy Campbell; Gabbriette Bechtel; Austin Nichols; Freddie Prinze Jr.; Jennifer Love Hewitt
- Cinematography: Elisha Christian
- Edited by: Saira Haider
- Music by: Chanda Dancy
- Production companies: Columbia Pictures; Screen Gems; Original Film
- Distributed by: Sony Pictures Releasing
- Release dates: July 14, 2025 (United Theater on Broadway); July 18, 2025 (United States)
- Running time: 111 minutes
- Country: United States
- Language: English
- Budget: $18 million
- Box office: $64.8 million

I Know What You Did Last Summer is a 2025 American slasher film that is the fourth installment in the I Know What You Did Last Summer franchise and a sequel to I Still Know What You Did Last Summer (1998). The film takes place 27 years after the Tower Bay murders in the second film, when another hook-wielding killer appears and begins targeting a group of friends one year after they covered up a car crash in which they killed someone. It was directed by Jennifer Kaytin Robinson, who co-wrote the screenplay with Sam Lansky from a story by Leah McKendrick and Robinson. The film stars Madelyn Cline, Chase Sui Wonders, Jonah Hauer-King, Tyriq Withers, Sarah Pidgeon, Billy Campbell, Gabbriette Bechtel, and Austin Nichols, with Freddie Prinze Jr. and Jennifer Love Hewitt reprising their roles as Ray Bronson and Julie James from the first two films.

Plans for a fourth film in the franchise started in 2014, when Mike Flanagan and Jeff Howard signed on to write a reboot with no connection to the previous installments. However, this version was ultimately not produced. Following the cancellation of the 2021 television series adaptation, the project was relaunched when Robinson pitched her version to Sony Pictures. The film was put into early development in February 2023, with producer Neal H. Moritz returning. Prinze Jr. and Hewitt were confirmed to be returning in 2024, with the new cast members joining throughout the year. Filming took place between October 2024 and March 2025 in Sydney and Los Angeles.

I Know What You Did Last Summer premiered at the United Theater on Broadway in Los Angeles on July 14, 2025, and was theatrically released by Sony Pictures Releasing in the United States on July 18. The film received mixed reviews from critics and grossed $64.8 million worldwide.

== Plot ==
On July 4, 2024, Ava Brucks visits her hometown of Southport, North Carolina, for her best friend Danica Richards' engagement party. Ava, Danica, Ava's ex-boyfriend Milo Griffin, and Danica's fiancé, Teddy Spencer, drive to see the fireworks, inviting their estranged friend Stevie Ward, who has recently left drug rehab. While parked on a winding cliffside road, Teddy causes a truck driven by Sam Cooper to swerve off the cliff. He swears them all to secrecy, his politician father, Grant, covers up the accident, and he and Danica break up.

One year later, Ava returns home for Danica's bridal shower for her wedding to her new fiancé Wyatt. Ava meets true crime podcaster Tyler Trevino, who is in Southport to research the killing spree conducted by fisherman Ben Willis in 1997. (Note: As depicted in I Know What You Did Last Summer (1997)) At the party, Danica receives a threatening note reading, "I know what you did last summer". That night, Wyatt is hacked to death by a hook-wielding fisherman who resembles the now-deceased Ben. (Note: Ben Willis was killed by Julie James in I Still Know What You Did Last Summer (1998).)

Ava meets with Tyler, who leads her to the exact spot where Ben Willis murdered sisters Elsa and Helen Shivers in 1997. Their investigation is cut short when the Fisherman ambushes them, brutally killing Tyler but not before Ava manages to wound the attacker. Realizing they are dealing with the same killer from all those years ago, the group turns to survivor Julie James for help. After hearing their story, Julie suspects that the Fisherman's latest rampage is driven by a personal connection to Sam.

At a town hall meeting, Julie's ex-husband and Stevie's boss Ray Bronson accuses Grant of covering up the 1997 killings to boost the town's appeal. Ava, Milo, and Stevie learn that Sam's truck belonged to town pastor Judah Gillespie. The Fisherman attacks Danica, but Teddy saves her. Milo is strangled by the Fisherman, who takes his corpse. Ava and Danica learn that Judah knew Sam, and report him to the police but are locked in an interrogation room for harassment instead. The Fisherman murders Teddy and Grant.

Ray urges the women to escape Southport on Teddy's yacht which the girls do after discovering Milo's body in his abandoned car. Meanwhile, police officers find Judah dead in his church, along with a photo of Sam and Stevie, revealing Stevie to be the Fisherman. On the yacht, Stevie ambushes Ava and Danica, explaining that she and Sam became friends in rehab and fell in love before his death, for which she now seeks revenge. Stevie stabs Danica and throws her overboard, but Ray shoots her off the boat.

At his bar, Ray tends to Ava, who notices he has an injury in the same spot she wounded the Fisherman, and realizes he is Stevie's accomplice. Julie learns this and rushes to the bar, where Ray attacks them. Ray reveals he followed Ben's footsteps and took Stevie as his partner not only to help her but to seek revenge on Southport for trying to cover up his life's ruin over the 1997 killings. Before Ray can kill Julie, Ava fatally shoots him with a speargun. Danica survives, and after reuniting with Ava, she reveals to her that Stevie is still alive. Julie receives a note reading "it isn't over" and visits fellow survivor and her old roommate Karla Wilson to ask for her help.

== Cast ==
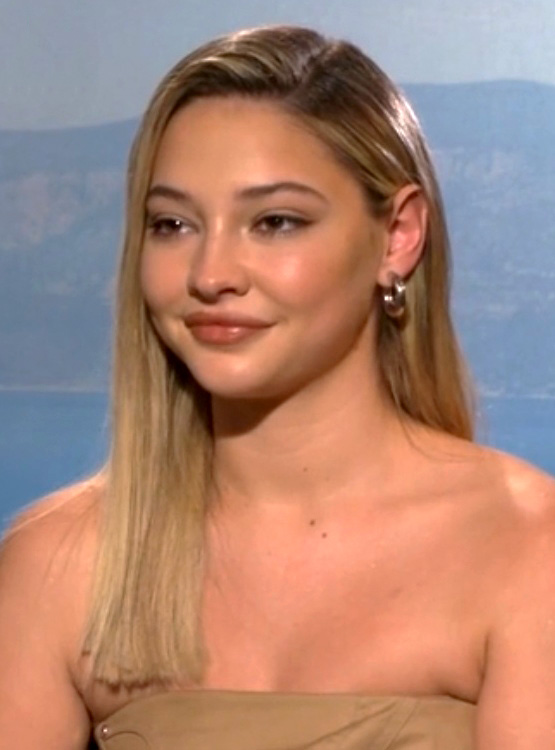
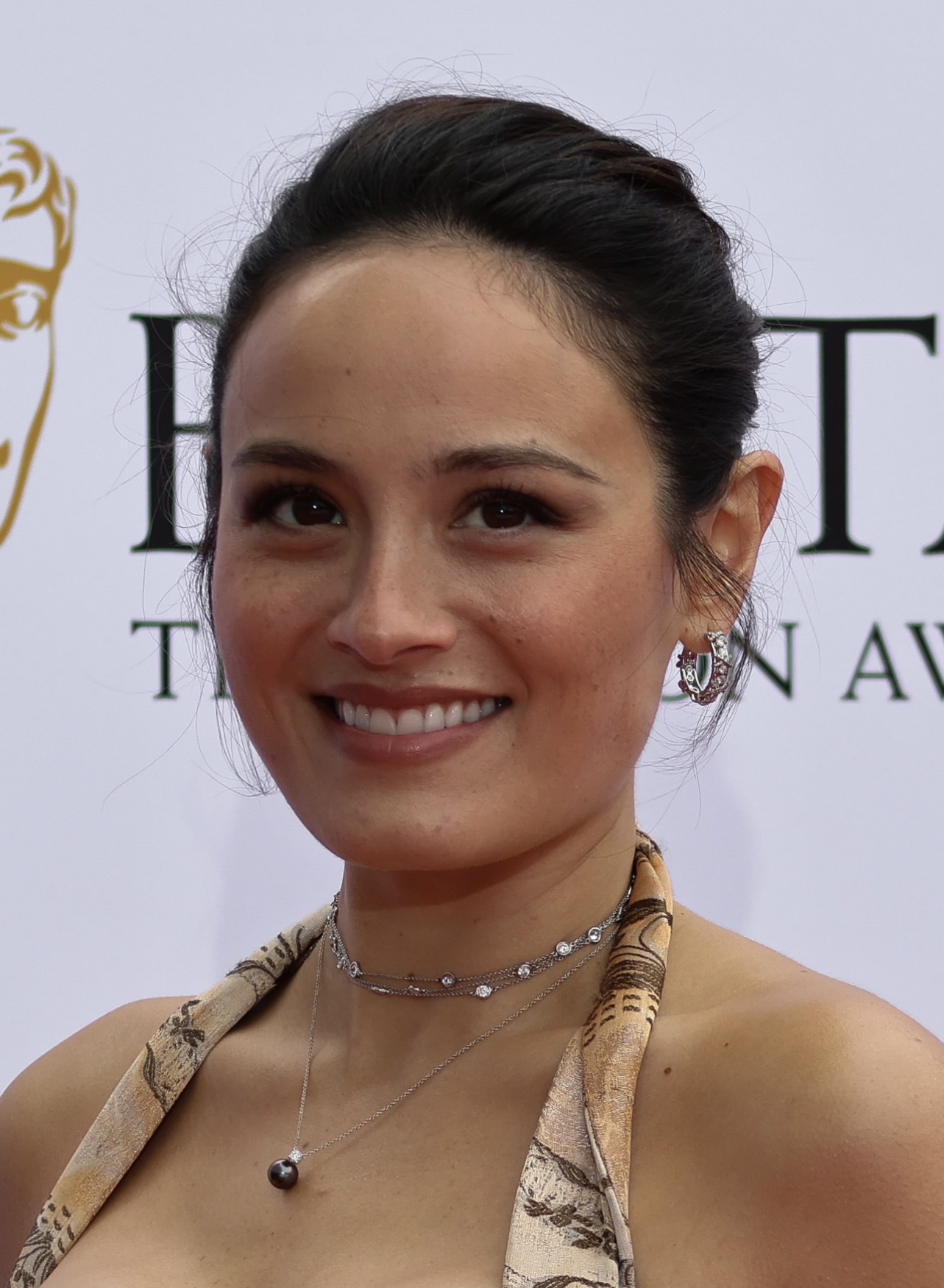
Madelyn Cline (left) and Chase Sui Wonders (right) play Danica and Ava, respectively.
- Madelyn Cline as Danica Richards, Ava's wealthy best friend
- Chase Sui Wonders as Ava Brucks, Danica's best friend
- Jonah Hauer-King as Milo Griffin, Ava's ex-boyfriend
- Tyriq Withers as Teddy Spencer, Danica's wealthy ex-fiancé
- Sarah Pidgeon as Stevie Ward, a friend of the group who works as a bar manager
- Billy Campbell as Grant Spencer, Teddy's father and the mayor of Southport
- Freddie Prinze Jr. as Ray Bronson, a bar owner and a survivor of the 1997 Southport Massacre
- Jennifer Love Hewitt as Julie James, a college professor and a survivor of the 1997 Southport Massacre
- Gabbriette Bechtel as Tyler Trevino, a podcaster who Ava befriends
- Austin Nichols as Pastor Judah Gillespie
- Joshua Orpin as Wyatt, Danica's fiancé
- Georgia Flood as Hannah Decker, Stevie's coworker

Additionally, Sarah Michelle Gellar and Brandy Norwood reprise their roles as Helen Shivers, a victim of the 1997 Southport massacre, and Karla Wilson, a survivor of the 1998 Tower Bay massacre, respectively. Isaiah Mustafa makes an uncredited appearance as Andrew, Karla's partner.

== Production ==
=== Development ===
In September 2014, Sony Pictures revealed plans to remake I Know What You Did Last Summer (1997), with Mike Flanagan and Jeff Howard writing the script. The film was a high priority and was initially set for release in 2014. The project required an estimated budget of $15 to 20 million. Flanagan confirmed that his new iteration of the franchise would be a reboot and not include elements of Lois Duncan's 1973 novel nor of the 1997 feature film. The project was ultimately never made and was subsequently canceled. According to Howard, the script would' have been inspired by the works of Agatha Christie, specifically Witness for the Prosecution, and feature Hewitt in a major supporting role as a Serial-like true crime podcaster.

Director Jennifer Kaytin Robinson and screenwriter Leah McKendrick came up with an idea for a new installment in the franchise and pitched it to Sony Pictures in the fourth quarter of 2022. The pitch successfully led to the film being put into early development in February 2023, with plans to have producer Neal H. Moritz and stars Jennifer Love Hewitt and Freddie Prinze Jr. return in their respective roles as Julie James and Ray Bronson from the original films. Days later, Sarah Michelle Gellar told Entertainment Weekly that she had been approached to reprise her role as Helen Shivers from the first film, owing to her friendship with Robinson, but declined because her character had died in the original film, and she did not want to unnecessarily retcon her death.

The screenplay was written by Robinson and Sam Lansky after McKendrick wrote the initial script. In March 2024, McKendrick revealed that the influence of social media would factor into the plot. In July, it was confirmed that the film would continue the story from I Still Know What You Did Last Summer (1998).

=== Casting ===
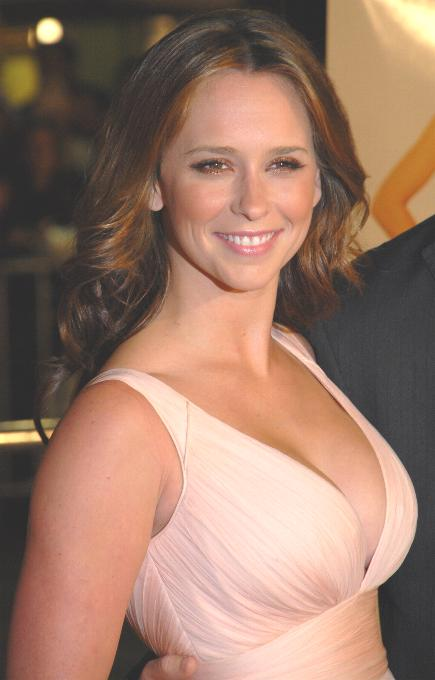
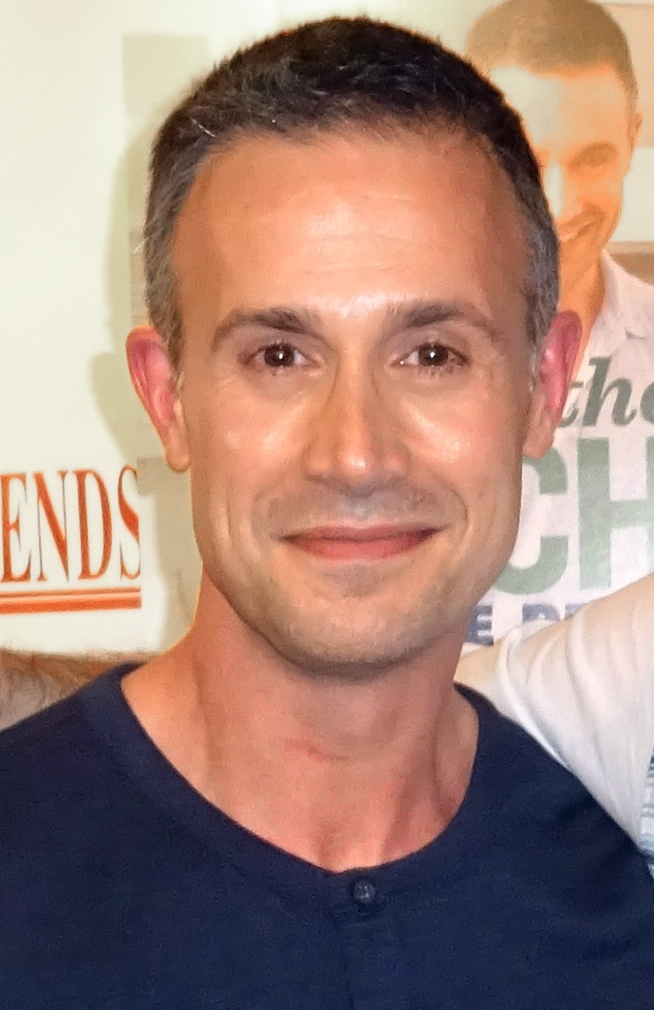
Jennifer Love Hewitt (left) and Freddie Prinze Jr. (right) reprise their roles as Julie and Ray.

In March 2023, Prinze Jr. said in an interview that he had not received an offer to join the film, explaining "They just said that to get people excited. I haven't spoken to anyone at their company, my agents haven't received an offer from them whatsoever." He later stated that Original Film announced the sequel without him and Hewitt signed on yet just to excite the fans and that he had met with Robinson after the announcement to discuss his possible involvement. He said that the meeting left him impressed with her idea for the film but noted that he had not signed on to appear as there was no script and he had received no concrete offer. In December, Hewitt stated that she would reprise her lead role.

In May 2024, it was reported that Prinze Jr. and Hewitt were expected to return. In July, Camila Mendes, Madelyn Cline, Sarah Pidgeon, Tyriq Withers and Jonah Hauer-King were negotiating roles in the film. In August, after previously expressing interest in reprising her role as Karla Wilson from the second film, Brandy Norwood confirmed she was in talks to do so after the studio reached out to her, though she was unsure on how exactly her character could return. In September, Mendes exited the project due to her starring in Amazon MGM Studios' Masters of the Universe (2026), while Cline, Pidgeon, Withers, and King were confirmed to star. Later that month, Chase Sui Wonders joined the cast, replacing Mendes, and Prinze Jr. was confirmed as having been cast, with Hewitt still in negotiations to return. In October, Billy Campbell was added to the cast. In November, Lola Tung, Nicholas Alexander Chavez, Austin Nichols and Gabbriette had joined the cast as well; however, it was later revealed that Tung and Chavez did not make it to the final cut of the film.

Negotiations between Hewitt and the studio took time, largely due to a scheduling conflict between the upcoming film and her commitment to the television series 9-1-1. As a major representative of the I Know What You Did Last Summer franchise, Hewitt had made it clear that she would reprise the character of Julie only if she were given a more substantial role in the new installment. In an interview with Parade, she explained, "If I'm going to come back 27 years later, I don't want to just be in it for five seconds. I don't want it to just be that thing like, 'Oh, there's the ghost of I Know What You Did past—here she is.' I want to carve out the time to really be in it, to make it matter for people." In December, Hewitt announced her return via Instagram.

Robinson later shared that "there was no movie" without Hewitt and Prinze Jr. and that she "worked really closely" with the two returning actors while developing the story, ensuring they crafted versions of the characters that felt right to them.

Prinze Jr. indicated he thought his work with Hewitt in the film was their best yet together, telling People Magazine: "I know when we got together, they're the best scenes that we've put on camera together, of any of the three movies. I'm really proud of the work that Love and I got to do on screen."

=== Filming ===
Production was ready in October 2024, with principal photography in progress that month in New South Wales, Australia, with Elisha Christian as cinematographer. Locations include Newport Beach, White Bay and Paddington in Sydney. Filming continued in Los Angeles in February and March 2025, and finished on March 13. Additional last-minute shooting was conducted in early June 2025 to add a new ending in which Madelyn Cline's character survives (she died originally) and a short scene in which Cline looks at a framed photo of Sarah Michelle Gellar's legacy character at a grave site.

Chanda Dancy was hired to compose the score.

== Music ==
The soundtrack to I Know What You Did Last Summer was released by Milan Records on the same day as the film's release. The album contains 20 cues composed by Chanda Dancy. It is the fourth I Know What You Did Last Summer soundtrack album to be released.

I Know What You Did Last Summer (Original Motion Picture Soundtrack)

Film score by Chanda Dancy
- Released: July 18, 2025
- Length: 58:35
- Label: Milan Records

Commercial songs from the film, but not on the soundtrack

- "Tiny Screens" by Chloe Slater
- "Love Me Not" by Ravyn Lenae
- "Revelation" by the Knocks and Dragonette
- "Teen Rebel" by the Haunted Youth
- "People" by the 1975
- "Leave Me Alone" by Reneé Rapp
- "Carousel Horses" by Christian Lee Hutson
- "Swoon" by Fickle Friends
- "Wedding March"
- "Lewps" by Charlie Houston
- "Hush" by the Marías
- "Devil Town" by Angie McMahon
- "Days Move Slow" by Bully
- "Summer Forever" by Addison Rae

=== Score ===
I Know What You Did Last Summer (Original Motion Picture Soundtrack)
No.	Title	Length
1.	"Reaper's Curve"	1:59
2.	"The Pact"	3:30
3.	"The Note"	2:06
4.	"Harpooned"	2:56
5.	"Dani & Ava"	1:56
6.	"Podcast Girl"	2:07
7.	"Bayside House"	6:08
8.	"It's Happening Again"	2:17
9.	"Make Some Noise"	3:16
10.	"Graveyard"	1:50
11.	"Float Warehouse"	3:51
12.	"Motion Detected"	2:51
13.	"Call Me Back"	3:54
14.	"Broken Doors"	2:49
15.	"We Did a Bad Thing"	2:56
16.	"The Boardwalk"	0:51
17.	"We Need to Leave"	1:42
18.	"The Yacht"	6:22
19.	"Final Showdown"	4:18
20.	"An Old Friend"	0:56
Total length:		58:35

== Release ==
I Know What You Did Last Summer premiered at the United Theater on Broadway in Los Angeles on July 14, 2025, and was theatrically released by Sony Pictures Releasing in the United States on July 18.

The film was released on digital on August 26, and on 4K, Blu-ray and DVD on October 7. It was released on Netflix as part of a first-window deal on October 16.

== Reception ==
=== Box office ===
I Know What You Did Last Summer grossed $32.2 million in the United States and Canada, and $32.6 million in other territories, for a worldwide total of $64.8 million.

In the United States and Canada, I Know What You Did Last Summer was released alongside Smurfs and Eddington, and was projected to gross $13–17 million from 3,100 theaters in its opening weekend. The film made $5.9 million on its first day, including $2.2 million from Thursday previews. It went on to debut to $13 million, finishing third at the box office.

=== Critical response ===
On the review aggregator website Rotten Tomatoes, 36% of 212 critics' reviews are positive, with an average rating of 4.8/10. The website's consensus reads: "Faithfully harkening back to the original for better or worse, this I Know What You Did Last Summer reboot serves up plenty of nostalgia without finding a compelling hook of its own." Metacritic, which uses a weighted average, assigned the film a score of 42 out of 100, based on 33 critics, indicating "mixed or average" reviews. Audiences polled by CinemaScore gave the film an average grade of C+ on an A+ to F scale.

Alison Foreman of IndieWire gave the film a B+ and wrote that it's a "lean, mean serial killer flick". Entertainment Weekly's Jordan Hoffman gave the film a B− and wrote, "Clever moments and a sensational performance from Madelyn Cline keep the movie (mostly) alive." Brian Tallerico of RogerEbert.com gave it one out of four stars and wrote, "The overall shallowness of I Know What You Did Last Summer would be fine if it were just better made. In particular, the editing by Saira Haider is just off rhythm. It's like a car in the wrong gear, going in the right direction, but something's wrong with the speed. The kill scenes are particularly inconsistent as the first couple strike a tone of gory fun, but the back half of the film plays out like more serious fare." The Hollywood Reporter's Frank Scheck noted that while Robinson and Lansky clearly show affection for the franchise, they ultimately fail to inject fresh energy into what remains a creatively exhausted series that perhaps should have stayed buried. However, the outlet praised the return of Hewitt and Prinze Jr., highlighting their strong performances as vital links to the original films and for bringing much-needed gravitas to the story.
