= Cabaret Concert Theatre =

Defunct cellar café in Los Angeles, California

Coordinates: 34.0938°N 118.2824°W

The Cabaret Concert Theatre was a small cellar café/cabaret, located in the Silverlake district of Central Los Angeles, California.

It operated between 1950 and 1961. It was created by dancer Miriam Schiller with the help of a group of young actors and dancers who wanted a place to showcase their talent, the 100-seat theatre became a popular nightspot among television and film producers, talent scouts, agents and celebrities, who came to eat, drink and enjoy a wide variety of sophisticated revues, plays and concerts.

The long-running Billy Barnes Revue ran for two years before transferring to the larger Las Palmas Theatre, and subsequently to Broadway. Among the many talents whose careers benefited from being seen at the Cabaret Concert Theatre were Ann B. Davis (who was cast as "Schultzie" in the long-running Robert Cummings series, Love That Bob), Jackie Joseph ("Audrey" in the 1960 version of The Little Shop of Horrors), Ann Morgan Guilbert ("Millie Helper" on The Dick Van Dyke Show), Joyce Jameson (The Steve Allen Show), Bert Convy (the Broadway productions of Fiddler on the Roof and Cabaret) and Ken Berry (F Troop).

The performers, who received little or no pay for their work, supplemented their income by waiting on tables, taking tickets and other essential activities.

Located at 4212 Sunset Boulevard, at the intersection with Myra Street. The building was built around 1900. It was used for many years as a studio by D.W. Griffith, and his epic film The Birth of a Nation screened there in 1915.

In 1961, the building was converted into an authentic replica of a 16th-century Spanish tavern and renamed El Cid. Still operating today, El Cid continues to present a variety of entertainers, from flamenco dancers and Spanish guitarists to rockabilly singers, burlesque performers and comedians.
