= I Still Know What You Did Last Summer =

1998 film

- Theatrical release poster
- Directed by: Danny Cannon
- Written by: Trey Callaway
- Based on: Characters by Lois Duncan
- Produced by: Neal H. Moritz; Erik Feig; Stokely Chaffin; William S. Beasley
- Starring: Jennifer Love Hewitt; Freddie Prinze Jr.; Brandy; Mekhi Phifer; Muse Watson; Bill Cobbs; Matthew Settle
- Cinematography: Vernon Layton
- Edited by: Peck Prior
- Music by: John Frizzell
- Production company: Mandalay Entertainment
- Distributed by: Columbia Pictures
- Release dates: November 13, 1998 (United States); February 26, 1999 (Mexico); April 29, 1999 (Germany)
- Running time: 100 minutes
- Countries: United States; Mexico; Germany
- Language: English
- Budget: $24 million
- Box office: $84 million

I Still Know What You Did Last Summer is a 1998 slasher film. It is the second installment in the I Know What You Did Last Summer franchise. It was directed by Danny Cannon and written by Trey Callaway. It stars Jennifer Love Hewitt, Freddie Prinze Jr. and Muse Watson, who reprise their roles from the first film, while Brandy, Mekhi Phifer, Bill Cobbs and Matthew Settle also star. The film takes place one year after the first film and again follows the character of Julie James (Hewitt), who wins a vacation to the Bahamas with her friend group. During their vacation, they are targeted by a killer. The film is an international co-production between the United States, Mexico and Germany.

I Still Know What You Did Last Summer was released theatrically in the United States on November 13, 1998, by Columbia Pictures. It received negative reviews and grossed $84 million on a budget of $24 million.

It was followed by two further sequels, I'll Always Know What You Did Last Summer (2006) and I Know What You Did Last Summer (2025), and a television series.

== Plot ==
One year after the brutal murders of her friends, Helen Shivers and Barry Cox, by the vengeful fisherman, Ben Willis, (Note: As depicted in I Know What You Did Last Summer (1997)) Julie James is attending summer classes in Boston, but suffers from nightmares of the incident. Julie's roommate, Karla Wilson, receives a phone call from a local radio station and wins a vacation for four to the Bahamas. Julie invites her boyfriend, Ray Bronson, who, despite initially declining, decides to go. That evening, Ray and his co-worker, Dave, drive to Boston to surprise Julie, but stop due to a body in the middle of the road. When Ray discovers the body is a mannequin, Ben appears and kills Dave with his hook, then chases Ray in a truck, but Ray escapes and falls down a hill.

The next morning, Julie, Karla, Karla's boyfriend, Tyrell Martin, and their friend, Will Benson, depart for the trip. The group arrives at the hotel in Tower Bay and checks in. Meanwhile, Ray flees from the hospital and pawns the ring he was planning to propose to Julie with in exchange for a revolver. That evening at the hotel's bar, Julie is singing karaoke when the words, "I still know what you did last summer" roll on-screen. Terrified, she runs back to her room. Will confesses he likes Julie.

After murdering a dockhand named Darick, Ben slices Olga, the housekeeper, dragging her into a room. While the others get into a hot tub, Julie finds Darick dead in the closet of her room. Horrified, she informs them, but Darick's body is missing; Mr. Brooks, the hotel manager, refuses to believe her story. Mr. Brooks notes they are unable to leave the island due to an incoming storm. By the pool, Titus Telesco is murdered. Ray, who has survived his injuries, heads out to rescue Julie.

The next day, the group rescues Julie after Ben locked her in a tanning bed. They find Olga, Titus, and Mr. Brooks murdered, the two-way radio—their only way of contact—destroyed, and the boats missing from the docks. Julie then confesses to the group about the incident two years prior. The group goes to the room of Estes, the boat hand porter, and finds that he has been using voodoo against them. Estes explains he was trying to protect them after realizing that their answer to the radio station's question was incorrect, indicating that Julie was set up to be drawn to the island. He tells them that Ben's wife, Sarah, was found murdered and that he allegedly killed her after catching her cheating. Estes goes missing and Will volunteers to find him, while Ray takes a boat to the island. Julie, Karla, and Tyrell return to the hotel and find Nancy, the bartender, hiding in the kitchen.

Ben appears in the kitchen and kills Tyrell. The girls retreat to the attic, where Karla is attacked by Ben. Julie and Nancy rescue Karla and run to the storm cellar, where they find Ben's victims. Will bursts in and takes the girls back to the hotel, stating that he saw Ben on the beach. At the hotel, Will tells them that Estes attacked him and he is bleeding from the stomach. Nancy and Karla leave to find a first aid kit, but find Estes impaled with a harpoon. Ben appears, kills Nancy and attacks Karla. While Julie tends to Will, he tauntingly reveals that it is not his blood and that he was the radio host and had killed Estes.

Will drags Julie to a graveyard, where he reveals that he is Ben's son. Ben appears and attacks Julie before Ray arrives and engages in a fight with Will. When Ben tries to stab Ray, he accidentally kills Will instead. While Ben is distraught from killing his son and preparing to kill Ray, Julie shoots him dead. Back at the hotel, Karla is found alive and they are rescued by the coast guard.

Some time later, Julie and Ray get married and buy a home. While Ray is brushing his teeth in the bathroom, Julie sits down on the bed and looks in the mirror, seeing Ben underneath. She screams as Ben pulls her under the bed. (Note: This is revealed to be a nightmare as per the sequel.)

== Cast ==
- Jennifer Love Hewitt as Julie James, a survivor of the 1997 Southport Massacre and Ben Willis's primary target
- Freddie Prinze Jr. as Ray Bronson, Julie's boyfriend and a survivor in the 1997 Southport Massacre
- Brandy as Karla Wilson, Julie's college friend and roommate
- Mekhi Phifer as Tyrell Martin, Karla's boyfriend
- Muse Watson as Ben Willis / The Fisherman, a ruthless serial killer who was left for dead in 1997 and seeks payback for it
- Bill Cobbs as Estes, the resort bellhop and voodoo practitioner
- Matthew Settle as Will Benson, a college friend to Julie who turns out to be Ben Willis's son
- Jeffrey Combs as Mr. Brooks, the resort manager
- Jennifer Esposito as Nancy, the resort bartender
- John Hawkes as Dave, Ray's dock co-worker
- Ellerine Harding as Olga, the resort maid
- Benjamin Brown as Darick, the resort dockhand
- Jack Black as Titus Telesco (uncredited), the resort pot-headed pool boy

== Production ==
In 1997, director Mike Mendez pitched a sequel to I Know What You Did Last Summer that would have brought back Jennifer Love Hewitt and Freddie Prinze, Jr. in a college setting. The following February, British filmmaker Danny Cannon was announced as director, unrelated to Mendez's idea. Matthew Settle, Brandy, Hewitt and Prinze Jr. joined the cast in March 1998, with Jennifer Esposito joining a month later.

In a 2018 interview, writer Trey Callaway revealed that he was asked by Mandalay Pictures if he was interested in penning the script for the sequel. Being a fan of the original, Callaway agreed, pitched his take, and was hired. In order to capitalize on the success of the first movie, the studio was eager to get production underway, with filming starting around six months after Callaway sold his pitch. Mandalay had also hired Stephen Gaghan to write a different version of the screenplay, with it reportedly set in New Orleans. They eventually chose Callaway's script over Gaghan's; however, in early promotional trailers, Gaghan was listed as co-screenwriter.

== Music ==
I Still Know What You Did Last Summer: Music from the Motion Picture

Soundtrack album (Digital download)/Audio CD by Various
- Released: November 17, 1998
- Length: 51:14
- Label: Warner Bros. Records

I Still Know What You Did Last Summer: Music from the Motion Picture
No.	Title	Writer(s)	Producer(s)	Length
1.	"Sugar Is Sweeter (Danny Saber Remix)" (CJ Bolland featuring Justin Warfield)	CJ Bolland; Kris Vanderheyden; Cornelia Van Lierop	CJ Bolland	4:57
2.	"How Do I Deal" (Jennifer Love Hewitt)	Dillon O'Brian; Phil Roy; Bob Thiele Jr.	Bruce Fairbairn; David Foster	3:23
3.	"Relax" (Deetah)	Mark Knopfler; Anders Bagge; Claudia Ogalde	BAG; Bloodshy	3:51
4.	"Hey Now Now" (Swirl 360)	Shelly Peiken; Denny Scott; Kenny Scott; John Shanks	Michael Mangini	4:37
5.	"Blue Monday" (Orgy)	Bernard Sumner; Gillian Gilbert; Peter Hook; Stephen Morris	Josh Abraham; Orgy	4:32
6.	"Polite" (Bijou Phillips)	Bijou Phillips; Greg Wells	Jerry Harrison	4:25
7.	"Try to Say Goodbye" (Jory Eve)	Jory Eve; Jeff Pescetto	Jeff Pescetto	3:35
8.	"Testimony" (Grant Lee Buffalo)	Grant-Lee Phillips	Paul Fox	3:59
9.	"(Do You) Wanna Ride" (Reel Tight)	Bobby Torrence; Reginald Long; Danny Johnson; Robert Rice; Corey Tatum	Corey "Co-T" Tatum	3:33
10.	"Getting Scared" (Imogen Heap)	Imogen Heap; Guy Sigsworth	Guy Sigsworth	4:51
11.	"Górecki" (Lamb)	Andrew Barlow; Louise Rhodes	Lamb	6:22
12.	"Julie's Theme" (John Frizzell)	John Frizzell	John Frizzell	2:52

The soundtrack was released on November 17, 1998, by Warner Bros. Records. On January 19, 1999, "How Do I Deal" was released as a single, backed by Jory Eve's "Try to Say Goodbye". A music video for "How Do I Deal" was made available to music television networks.

- The song "Eden" by Belgian rock/pop group Hooverphonic was also featured in the film, but did not appear on the final soundtrack. The song appeared early in the film, when Julie looked at the picture of Helen beside her bed.
- The song "That Girl" by Canadian rock/pop artist Esthero was also featured in the film as the group arrive in the Bahamas and the setting changes.

In a 1998 interview during the film's promotion, John Frizzell explained that his score for I Still Know What You Did Last Summer featured none of the original themes, as it had a "different look, setting, and feeling." He built tension gradually, with moments that "jump out at you unexpectedly." The score includes avant-garde vocals by Joan LaBarbara, used atmospherically through multitracking and manipulation. Frizzell also incorporated unusual instruments like the psaltery and a detuned dulcimer, creating what he called a "very quiet and creepy" effect.

== Reception ==
=== Box office ===
The film made $16.5 million from 2,443 theaters during its opening weekend, finishing second behind holdover The Waterboy. At the end of its 15-week run, the film grossed $40 million in the United States. Worldwide, the sequel earned a strong $84 million during its entire theatrical run.

=== Critical response ===
On the review aggregator website Rotten Tomatoes, the film holds an approval rating of 10% based on 61 reviews, with an average rating of 3.5/10. The website's critics consensus reads, "Boring, predictable and bereft of thrills or chills, I Still Know What You Did Last Summer is exactly the kind of rehash that gives horror sequels a bad name." On Metacritic, the film has a weighted average score of 21 out of 100, based on 19 critics, indicating "generally unfavorable" reviews. Audiences polled by CinemaScore gave the film an average grade of "B" on an A+ to F scale.

Leonard Klady of Variety said: "Purists will find the pic's obviousness disappointing, but there's no question that the film delivers a sufficient shock quotient to satisfy its youthful target audience." CNN critic Dave Rickett considered it "a better installment to that series than to its parent film", adding that it "keeps you on the edge of your seat, almost from the beginning". Dan Tobin from The Boston Phoenix shared a similar sentiment, writing: "It's better than the original, but only because the original was so heinous — the sequel actually benefits from the thinner plot".

E! gave it a B+ grade, writing: "Despite working within the confines of the hot-teens-in-distress genre, director Cannon proves he's no hack by doing something truly shocking: he's made a sequel that's a cut or two above the original."

In a 2017 interview, I Know What You Did Last Summer director Jim Gillespie, said: "I thought it wasn't the right story. I didn't like the premise. It kind of killed the franchise a little bit. They had a chance to do something a bit different and for me it didn't work."

== Sequels ==
On August 15, 2006, a direct-to-video film titled I'll Always Know What You Did Last Summer was released. The film is a standalone sequel to the two previous films and features no returning cast members. It was originally proposed to continue where I Still Know What You Did Last Summer left off. Instead, the film features a mostly unrelated plot with only brief references to the first two films.

In February 2023, a legacy sequel was announced to be in development with Hewitt and Prinze Jr. in talks to star, and Jennifer Kaytin Robinson directing from a script by Leah McKendrick. I Know What You Did Last Summer was released on July 18, 2025.

== Book ==
A paperback edition of the screenplay was published in 1998.
