= Rebel Moon (franchise) =

Space opera franchise by Zack Snyder

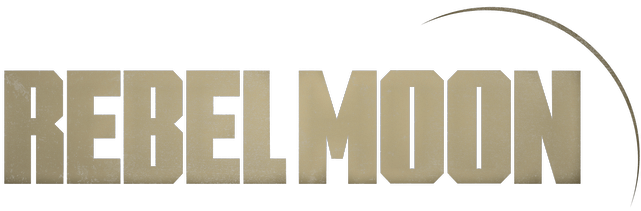
- Created by: Zack Snyder
- Original work: Rebel Moon (2023)
- Years: 2023–present

Print publications
- Comics: Rebel Moon: House of the Bloodaxe (2024); Rebel Moon: Nemesis (2025)

Films and television
- Film(s): Rebel Moon – Part One: A Child of Fire (2023); Rebel Moon – Part Two: The Scargiver (2024)

Games
- Role-playing: Rebel Moon Tabletop Role Playing Game (cancelled)
- Video game(s): Rebel Moon: The Descent (2024); Blood Line: A Rebel Moon Game (2025)

Audio
- Podcast(s): The Seneschal: A Rebel Moon Story (2024)
- Soundtrack(s): Rebel Moon; Rebel Moon – Part Two: The Scargiver

Rebel Moon is an American epic space opera media franchise created by Zack Snyder, which began with the 2023 film Rebel Moon – Part One: A Child of Fire, and was followed by the sequel film Rebel Moon – Part Two: The Scargiver (2024). The franchise has been expanded into other media, including video games, comic books and a podcast.

== Films ==
Film	U.S. release date	Director	Screenwriters	Story by	Producers	Distributed by
Rebel Moon – Part One: A Child of Fire	December 15, 2023	Zack Snyder	Zack Snyder, Kurt Johnstad and Shay Hatten	Zack Snyder	Deborah Snyder, Eric Newman, Zack Snyder and Wesley Coller	Netflix
Rebel Moon – Part Two: The Scargiver	April 12, 2024	Zack Snyder	Zack Snyder, Kurt Johnstad and Shay Hatten	Zack Snyder	Deborah Snyder, Eric Newman, Zack Snyder and Wesley Coller	Netflix

== Games ==
The virtual reality game Rebel Moon: The Descent launched as a limited preview from Sandbox VR in London along with the release of Rebel Moon – Part Two: The Scargiver in April 2024. At Gamescom in August 2023, Snyder announced that Super Evil Megacorp was developing a four-player co-op action game that would be exclusively available on the Netflix Games platform. Super Evil Megacorp's game, Blood Line: A Rebel Moon Game, launched in July 2025.

In early 2023, Evil Genius Games entered into a licensing agreement with Netflix to develop an official tabletop role playing game set in the Rebel Moon universe. The company produced early promotional materials and presented elements of the game at the GAMA Expo later that year. In September 2023, Netflix terminated its contract with Evil Genius Games, alleging that the company had breached confidentiality obligations by publicly displaying unapproved materials. Evil Genius Games denied the allegations and filed a lawsuit accusing Netflix of wrongful termination and breach of contract. Additional reporting stated that Netflix claimed ownership of all project-related work following the termination. In January 2024, Evil Genius Games announced that the lawsuit had been "amicably settled", and confirmed that the Rebel Moon tabletop role playing game had been cancelled. The company stated that refunds for pre orders would follow.

== Comic books ==
A four-issue prequel comic entitled Rebel Moon: House of the Bloodaxe by writer Magdalene Visaggio and artist Clark Bint was published by Titan Comics in January 2024. Titan Comics published a prequel series for the Nemesis character, written by Gail Simone and drawn by Federico Bertoni, titled Rebel Moon: Nemesis. In November 2023, a narrative-podcast, an animated comic book, and an animated series were announced to be in development with each project taking place chronologically before the feature films.

== Podcast ==
The narrative fiction podcast The Seneschal: A Rebel Moon Story by writer Magdalene Visaggio, starring Ella Purnell, Naveen Andrews, Alfred Enoch, Peter Serafinowicz and Jason Isaacs, released the first of six episodes on July 29, 2024. Set 500 years before the movie, it tells the story of the first Jimmy and the married master artisans Adwin and Raina of Saaldoran who created him for a mad king. It carries a content warning, same as the novelizations. The podcast was nominated for a 2025 Ambies award for best Fiction Podcast. It was produced by Wolf at the Door studios.

== Cast and characters ==
List indicators

This section includes characters who will appear or have appeared in the Rebel Moon franchise.

- An empty grey cell indicates the character was not in the film, or that the character's official presence has not yet been confirmed.
- ^{V} indicates a voice-only role.

Characters	Films	
Characters	Rebel Moon – Part One: A Child of Fire	Rebel Moon – Part Two: The Scargiver
Kora / Arthelais	Sofia Boutella	Sofia Boutella
Titus	Djimon Hounsou	Djimon Hounsou
Atticus Noble	Ed Skrein	Ed Skrein
Gunnar	Michiel Huisman	Michiel Huisman
Nemesis	Bae Doona	Bae Doona
Darrian Bloodaxe	Ray Fisher	Ray Fisher
Kai	Charlie Hunnam	
JC-1435	Anthony Hopkins^{V}	Anthony Hopkins^{V}
Tarak	Staz Nair	Staz Nair
Balisarius	Fra Fee	Fra Fee
Devra Bloodaxe	Cleopatra Coleman	Cleopatra Coleman
Den	Stuart Martin	Stuart Martin
Hagen	Ingvar Sigurdsson	Ingvar Sigurdsson
Cassius	Alfonso Herrera	Alfonso Herrera
The King	Cary Elwes	Cary Elwes
The Queen	Rhian Rees	Rhian Rees
Princess Issa	Stella Grace Fitzgerald	Stella Grace Fitzgerald
Milius	Elise Duffy	Elise Duffy
Aris	Sky Yang	Sky Yang
Sam	Charlotte Maggi	Charlotte Maggi

== Critical reception ==
Film	Rotten Tomatoes	Metacritic
Rebel Moon – Part One: A Child of Fire	22% (184 reviews)	31 (40 reviews)
Rebel Moon – Part Two: The Scargiver	16% (118 reviews)	35 (28 reviews)
