= List of films produced back-to-back =

Sometimes, two or more films in a series are shot and produced "back-to-back", which means simultaneously or within a short space of time. However the term “2 back to back” refers to two sequential occurrences that in turn produce four of the said occurrence. 2 back to back, (back to back, back to back) This is usually done to eliminate the need to rebuild sets and re-hire actors for sequels, and maintain audience interest in the film series. Films produced this way usually have a well-planned pipeline, where the first film may be in post-production as the second is being shot.

While sometimes a trilogy such as The Lord of the Rings is shot with all three parts back-to-back, it is much more common for only two parts to be shot this way. Often, in a trilogy, the first film will be made on its own, and if it is a success, the remaining two parts will be produced back-to-back. This approach was pioneered by the second and third parts of the Sleepaway Camp trilogy, and has since been applied to the Back to the Future and The Matrix trilogies. Back to the Future Part II, and later, The Matrix Reloaded both ended with the words "To be concluded," a variant on the traditional "To be continued," and a trailer for their respective upcoming sequels.

The following is a list of films that have been produced this way:

== List ==
- Les Misérables - Parts 1, 2 and 3 (1934)
- The Tiger of Eschnapur and The Indian Tomb (both 1938)
- The Count of Monte Cristo (1943)
- Roger la Honte and The Revenge of Roger (both 1946)
- Mandrin (1947 and 1948)
- The Battle of Stalingrad (1949)
- I tre corsari (1952) and Jolanda, the Daughter of the Black Corsair (1953)
- Stars Over Colombo (1953) and The Prisoner of the Maharaja (1954)
- The Count of Monte Cristo (1954)
- The Aztec Mummy (1957), The Curse of the Aztec Mummy (1958) and The Robot vs. The Aztec Mummy (1958)
- And Quiet Flows the Don (1958)
- The Tiger of Eschnapur and The Indian Tomb (both 1959)
- The Buddenbrooks (1959)
- The Human Condition (1959-1961)
- Mistress of the World (1960)
- The Three Musketeers (1961)
- The Count of Monte Cristo (1961)
- Kali Yug: Goddess of Vengeance (1963) and The Mystery of the Indian Temple (1964)
- Anatomy of a Marriage: My Days with Françoise and Anatomy of a Marriage: My Days with Jean-Marc (both 1964)
- Back Door to Hell and Flight to Fury (both 1964)
- The Treasure of the Aztecs and The Pyramid of the Sun God (both 1965)
- Wild Kurdistan and Kingdom of the Silver Lion (both 1965)
- The Sea Pirate and Tonnerre sur l'océan Indien (both 1966)
- Ride in the Whirlwind and The Shooting (both 1966)
- Wild, Wild Planet (1966), War of the Planets (1966), War Between the Planets (1966) and Snow Devils (1967)
- War and Peace (1966 and 1967)
- Die Nibelungen (1966 and 1967)
- The Last Roman (1968 and 1969)
- Two Undercover Angels and Kiss Me Monster (both 1969)
- The Emigrants (1971) and The New Land (1972)
- The Three Musketeers (1973) and The Four Musketeers (1974), shot as one film but split into two during post-production
- 1900 (1976)
- Superman (1978) and Superman II (1980) (see also Superman II: The Richard Donner Cut, released 2006)
- Petrovka, 38 (1980) and Ogaryova Street, Number 6 (1980), both films directed by Boris Grigoryev that were based on novels by Yulian Semyonov about Kostenko.
- Trail of the Pink Panther (1982) and Curse of the Pink Panther (1983), parts of the Pink Panther series
- The Outsiders (1983) and Rumble Fish (1983), both films directed by Francis Ford Coppola that were based on novels by S.E. Hinton.
- Missing in Action (1984) and Missing in Action 2: The Beginning (1985), the second film was filmed first, but released later as a prequel
- King Solomon's Mines (1985) and Allan Quatermain and the Lost City of Gold (1986)
- Jean de Florette and Manon des Sources (both 1986)
- Sleepaway Camp II: Unhappy Campers (1988) and III: Teenage Wasteland (1989), sequels to the 1983 film Sleepaway Camp
- The Toxic Avenger Part II and The Toxic Avenger Part III: The Last Temptation of Toxie (both 1989) were filmed as one movie but was later re-edited into two
- La Révolution française (1989)
- Back to the Future Part II (1989) and Part III (1990), of the Back to the Future film series
- Critters 3 and 4 (both 1991), two films of the Critters series
- The Lost World and Return to the Lost World (both 1992)
- Smoking/No Smoking (1993)
- The Three Colours trilogy: Blue (1993), White (1994) and Red (1994)
- Joan the Maiden (1994)
- Oblivion (1994) and Oblivion 2: Backlash (1996)
- Blue in the Face (1995) was conceived and filmed completely ad libbed immediately following production of Smoke (1995)
- Bullet to Beijing (1995) and Midnight in Saint Petersburg (1996)
- Young and Dangerous, Young and Dangerous 2 and Young and Dangerous 3 (all 1996)
- Universal Soldier II: Brothers in Arms and Universal Soldier III: Unfinished Business (both 1998)
- Wishmaster 3: Beyond the Gates of Hell (2001) and Wishmaster: The Prophecy Fulfilled (2002)
- The Lord of the Rings trilogy: The Fellowship of the Ring (2001), The Two Towers (2002) and The Return of the King (2003) (details)
- Lucas Belvaux's Trilogy, which premiered at the 2002 Toronto International Film Festival, comprises three standalone films describing the same 24 hours from different characters' intersecting viewpoints: One (On the Run), Two (An Amazing Couple), and Three (After the Life)
- The Matrix Reloaded and The Matrix Revolutions (both 2003), parts of the Matrix series
- The Best of Youth (2003)
- Dracula II: Ascension (2003) and Dracula III: Legacy (2005), both were filmed in 2002.
- Eloise at the Plaza and Eloise at Christmastime (both 2003)
- Kill Bill: Volume 1 (2003) and Volume 2 (2004), which were originally shot as one film and later edited into two
- Anchorman: The Legend of Ron Burgundy and Wake Up, Ron Burgundy: The Lost Movie (2004), the second being a direct-to-video effort assembled from deleted scenes and outtakes of the first
- Ginger Snaps 2: Unleashed and Ginger Snaps Back: The Beginning (both 2004)
- Hellraiser: Deader and Hellraiser: Hellworld (both 2005)
- The Prophecy: Uprising and The Prophecy: Forsaken (both 2005)
- Return of the Living Dead: Necropolis and Rave to the Grave (both 2005), the fourth and fifth films in the Return of the Living Dead series
- Pirates of the Caribbean: Dead Man's Chest (2006) and At World's End (2007), the second and third films in the Pirates of the Caribbean series
- Flags of Our Fathers and Letters from Iwo Jima (both 2006)
- Arn – The Knight Templar (2007) and Arn – The Kingdom at Road's End (2008)
- Che Part 1: The Argentine and Che Part 2: Guerilla (both 2008)
- Anaconda 3: Offspring (2008) and Anacondas: Trail of Blood (2009)
- Pulse 2: Afterlife and Pulse 3 (both 2008)
- Feast II: Sloppy Seconds (2008) and Feast III: The Happy Finish (2009)
- Mesrine (2008)
- Red Cliff, Part I (2008) and Red Cliff, Part II (2009)
- Shred (2008) and Revenge of the Boarding School Dropouts (2009)
- The Girl Who Played with Fire and The Girl Who Kicked the Hornets' Nest (both 2009)
- Arthur and the Revenge of Maltazard (2009) and Arthur 3: The War of the Two Worlds (2010); the films were edited into Arthur and the Great Adventure (2010) for release in the United Kingdom
- Harry Potter and the Deathly Hallows – Part 1 (2010) and Part 2 (2011)
- Burnt by the Sun 2 (2010) and Burnt by the Sun 2: The Citadel (2011)
- The 10 "chapters" of the Adams Apples film series (2011–2012)
- The Twilight Saga: Breaking Dawn – Part 1 (2011) and Part 2 (2012)
- Gangs of Wasseypur - Part 1 and Part 2 were originally shot as a single film measuring a total of 319 minutes, but because of its over-five-hour length, it was divided into two parts (160 mins and 159 mins, respectively) for the Indian market.
- Nymphomaniac (2013) was originally supposed to be only one complete entry; but, because of its over-five-hour length, Lars von Trier had to split the project into two separate films.
- The Hobbit trilogy: An Unexpected Journey (2012), The Desolation of Smaug (2013) and The Battle of the Five Armies (2014)
- The Crossing, Part I (2014) and The Crossing, Part II (2015)
- The Hunger Games: Mockingjay – Part 1 (2014) and Part 2 (2015)
- Baahubali: The Beginning (2015) and Baahubali 2: The Conclusion (2017)
- Fifty Shades Darker (2017) and Fifty Shades Freed (2018)
- Avengers: Infinity War (2018) and Avengers: Endgame (2019) as part of the conclusion of the Infinity Saga (the first 11 years) of the Marvel Cinematic Universe (details)
- K.G.F: Chapter 1 (2018) and K.G.F: Chapter 2 (2022)
- To All the Boys: P.S. I Still Love You (2020) and To All the Boys: Always and Forever (2021)
- The Kissing Booth 2 (2020) and The Kissing Booth 3 (2021)
- After We Fell (2021), After Ever Happy (2022) and After Everything (2023)
- The Battle at Lake Changjin (2021) and The Battle at Lake Changjin II (2022)
- Fear Street trilogy: Part One: 1994, Part Two: 1978 and Part Three: 1666 (all 2021)
- Detective Knight: Rogue, Redemption (both 2022) and Independence (2023)
- Pushpa: The Rise (2021) and Pushpa 2: The Rule (2024)
- X and Pearl (both 2022)
- Ivy + Bean, The Ghost That Had to Go and Doomed to Dance (all 2022)
- Ponniyin Selvan: I (2022) and II (2023)
- Avatar: The Way of Water (2022) and Avatar: Fire and Ash (2025) alongside some footage for Avatar 4 (2029) and Avatar 5 (2031)
- The Three Musketeers: D'Artagnan (2023) and The Three Musketeers: Milady (2023)
- Rebel Moon - Part One: A Child of Fire (2023) and Rebel Moon - Part Two: The Scargiver (2024)
- The Strangers: Chapter 1 (2024), Chapter 2 (2025) and Chapter 3 (2026)
- Horizon: An American Saga (2024). A planned four-part film by Kevin Costner. The first two films were completed in 2024. Costner plans for two more films.
- Wicked (2024) and Wicked: For Good (2025)
- Nishaanchi (2025) and Nishaanchi Part 2 (2025) were shot as a singular 6 hour film which was later edited into two parts with the former getting a theatrical release and the latter being released directly on Amazon Prime Video.
- Dhurandhar (2025) and Dhurandhar: The Revenge (2026), which were originally shot as one film and later edited into two
- 28 Years Later (2025) and 28 Years Later: The Bone Temple (2026)
- One Mile: Chapter One and Chapter Two (both 2026)
- Cold War 1994 (2026) and Cold War 1995 (2027)
- Your Fault: London (2026) and Our Fault: London (TBA)
- First Shift: Vengeance (TBA) and First Shift: Redemption (TBA)
- The Resurrection of the Christ: Part One (2027) and Part Two (2028)
- Red Notice 2 and Red Notice 3 (TBA)
- Avengers: Doomsday (2026) and Avengers: Secret Wars (2027) (details)
- Avatar 4 (2029) and Avatar 5 (2031)

Though not shot entirely back-to-back, the final scene of Star Wars: Episode III – Revenge of the Sith was shot in Tunisia during the production of Star Wars: Episode II – Attack of the Clones in order to avoid another trip to Tunisia for a single scene.

== See also ==
- Back-to-back film production
- List of films split into multiple parts
