= Mother of Mercy: The Call of the Horse =

- Mrs. Davis episode
- Episode no.: Season 1 Episode 1
- Directed by: Owen Harris
- Written by: Tara Hernandez; Damon Lindelof
- Cinematography by: Joe Anderson
- Editing by: Philip Fowler
- Original release date: April 20, 2023
- Running time: 55 minutes

Guest appearances
- Ben Chaplin as Arthur Schrodinger; Mathilde Ollivier as Clara LaFleur; Sam Huntington as; Kim Hawthorne as; Alexandra Bokyun Chun as; Darri Ingólfsson as Dieter Goebbels; Sherri Saum as; Margo Martindale as Mother Superior

Episode chronology
← Previous —	Next → "Zwei Sie Piel mit Seitung Sie Wirtschaftung"

"Mother of Mercy: The Call of the Horse" is the series premiere of the American science fiction drama television series Mrs. Davis. The episode was written by series creators Tara Hernandez and Damon Lindelof, and directed by executive producer Owen Harris. It was released on Peacock on April 20, 2023, alongside the three follow-up episodes.

The series follows Simone, a nun holding a grudge against Mrs. Davis, a powerful artificial intelligence that was able to prevent wars and famine by giving everyone what they wanted. Due to her past, Simone despises Mrs. Davis, and is part of the reason why she joined the convent. Soon, Simone is thrown into a world of chaos as she decides to accept a quest.

The series premiere received positive reviews from critics, who praised the series' ambition, performances, writing and tone shifts.

== Plot ==
=== 1307 ===
In Paris, a group of Knights Templar are publicly burned for heresy. The next day, soldiers raid a convent, claiming that the occupants are hiding the Holy Grail. The nuns reveal themselves to also be Templars and kill the soldiers, although all but one perish in the process. The last surviving Templar is told to escape with the Grail.

=== Present day ===
At an island, a sailor named Arthur Schrodinger (Ben Chaplin) has been shipwrecked with his cat for the past ten years. At night, he uses a rocket to send fireworks, hoping a boat will notice it. The next morning, he is saved by a boat. He is informed by a crew member that she is aware of his history, despite the fact that he was on board for just one hour. The woman explains that ever since he went missing, an artificial intelligence known as Mrs. Davis was deployed to stop famine and war, giving people what they want. She invites him to ask "her" anything through an earbud.

In Reno, Nevada, a married man is being driven by a woman for a one-night stand. When they almost hit a cow, the car crashes into a billboard, beheading the woman. Two police officers arrive at the scene, and the man tries to buy his way out of the incident. Suddenly, a nun named Simone (Betty Gilpin) arrives on a horse, and exposes the officers as magicians who tried to set him up, revealing that the cow is not real and the woman was safe in the trunk. As she leaves, the man is called by Mrs. Davis, who wants to talk to Simone. Simone refuses, and calls her as an "it".

The next day, Simone and the other nuns are informed by the Mother Superior (Margo Martindale) that she is selling the land and they will need to move. Simone deduces that this is result of her constantly ignoring Mrs. Davis. While stopping at a diner, Simone is subdued by a group of Germans, who want to know where "it" is, with Simone confused over what they want, or they will use a detonator to kill her horse. She escapes from them and is saved by Wiley (Jake McDorman), her ex-boyfriend. He takes her to the desert and lets her inside a hatch, with their conversation revealing that Simone used to be named Lizzie and that Wiley is part of a movement opposing Mrs. Davis. He dismisses her claims that the detonator kills her horse and activates it, until they discover that it actually killed the horse.

Angry, Simone drives away in a motorbike. She meets with her husband Jay (Andy McQueen), who suggests that Mrs. Davis really wants to meet her. She arrives at her old kindergarten school, where she meets with a woman. The woman is representing Mrs. Davis, who finally gets to talk to her. Simone realizes that Mrs. Davis manipulated the nuns to leave the convent, which would allow Mrs. Davis to buy it. Mrs. Davis offers Simone a wish for anything she wants, if she joins a quest. A tearful Simone says that her wish is for Mrs. Davis to turn off. Mrs. Davis accepts to do so, explaining the Simone's quest involves finding and destroying the Holy Grail. Although confused, Simone accepts.

== Production ==
=== Development ===
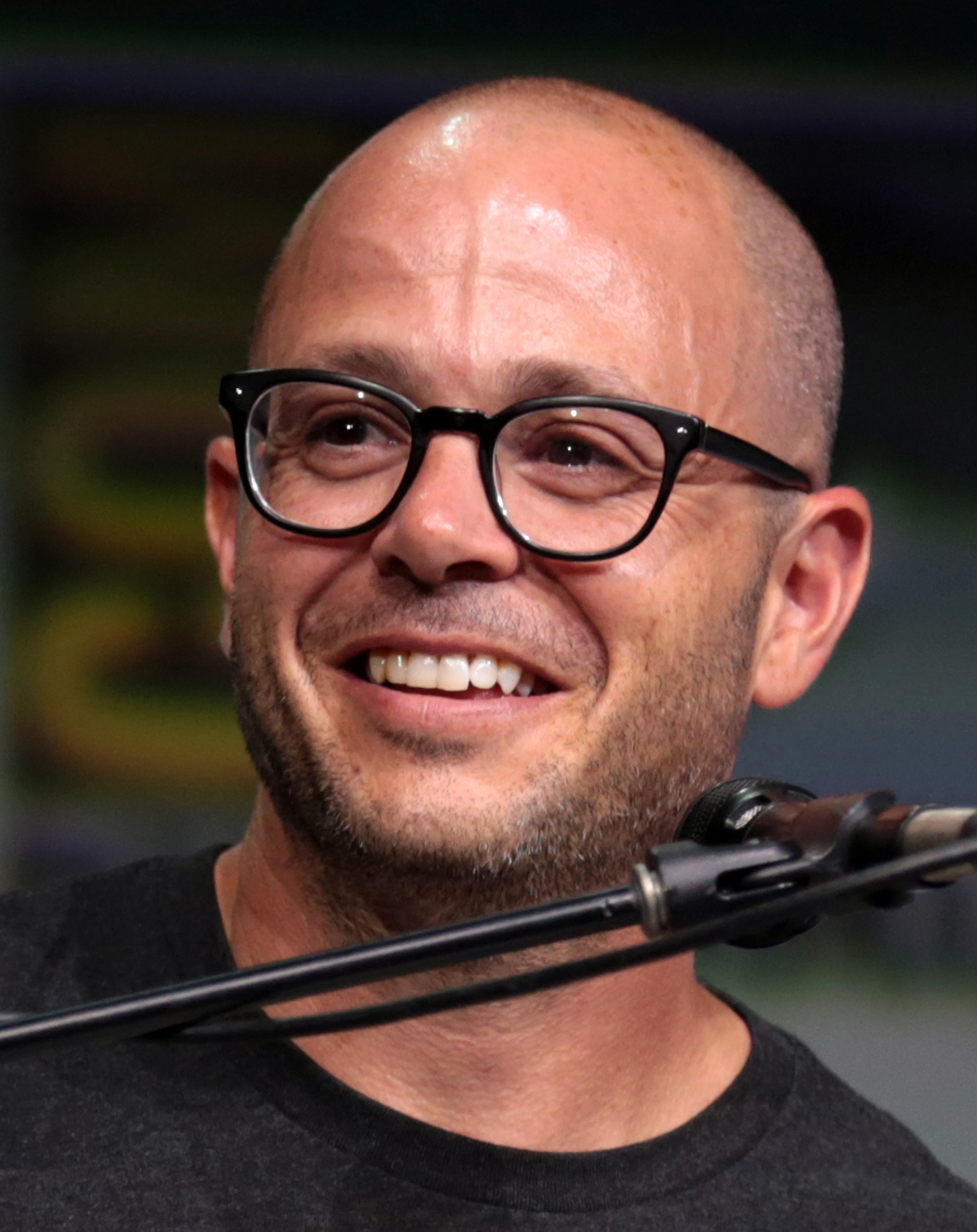
Damon Lindelof co-wrote the episode.

The project was announced in May 2021, when Peacock announced a series order for the series, with Damon Lindelof and Tara Hernandez serving as co-creators. The concept explored the idea of faith fighting technology, something that Lindelof considered an universal theme, "I have said everything that I have to say that's even remotely interesting about the afterlife, but I do feel that this is the primary fixation of what it is to be a human being on the planet." He further added, "Before we were talking about Mrs. Davis, we were feeling this real anxiety about technology. This idea of we need it, we love it, but we think we're using it too much. And we think we're using it for the wrong stuff. Is there a way to talk about this in a slightly goofier way? And to embody it in a story around a nun who is told to go find the Holy Grail and if she is successful she is able to defeat the A.I. She could be our avatar or superhero."

The episode was written by Tara Hernandez and Damon Lindelof, and directed by executive producer Owen Harris.

=== Casting ===
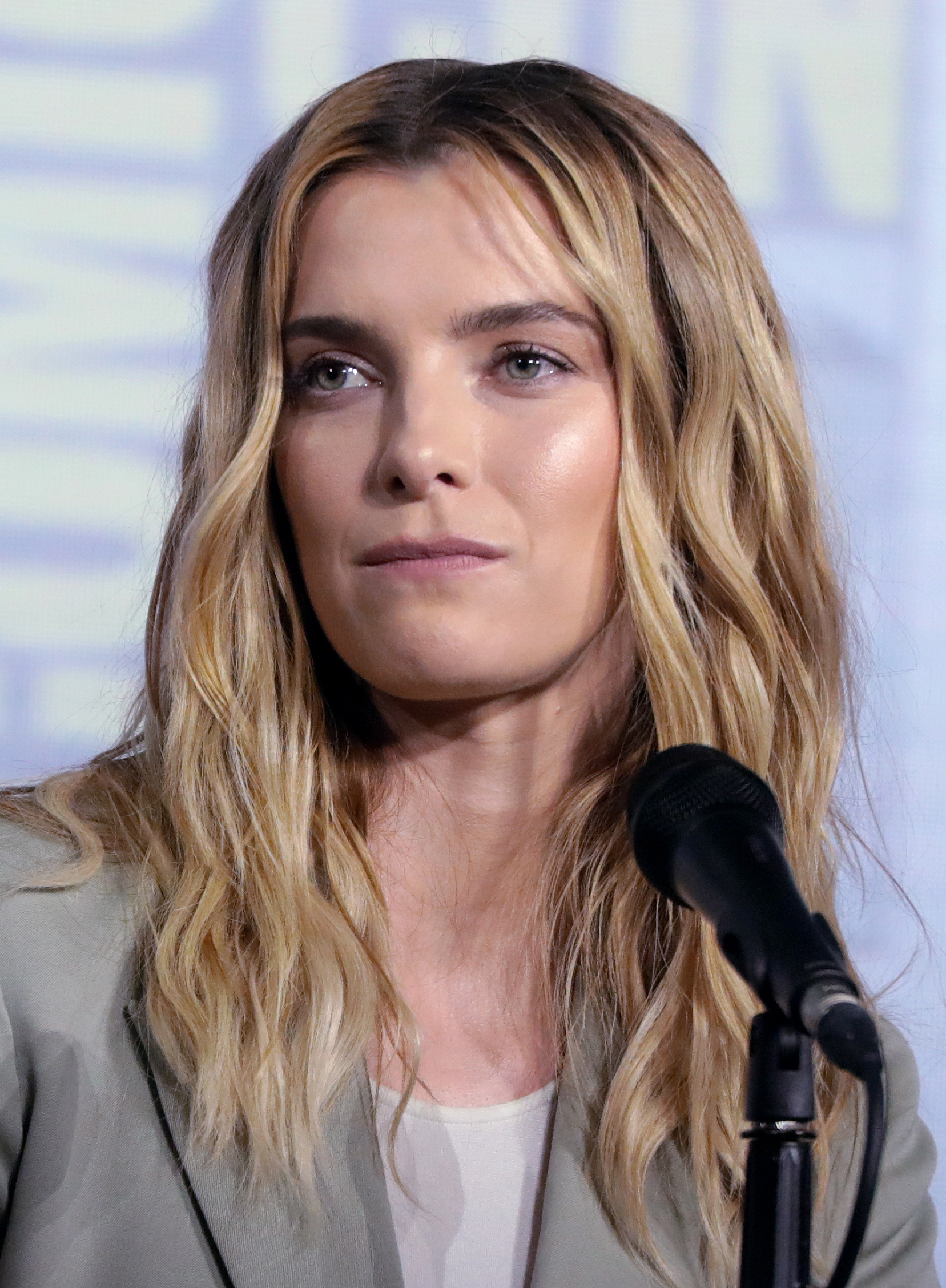
Betty Gilpin stars as the lead character, Simone.

In March 2022, Betty Gilpin was announced to star in the series, having previously worked with Lindelof in The Hunt. Originally, Gilpin was unavailable after giving birth to her child, but was approached once again after meeting with Lindelof and Hernandez. Her father, Jack Gilpin, is an Episcopal priest who introduced her to nuns in preparation for the role.

In May 2022, Jake McDorman was announced to star opposite Gilpin as part of the main cast. The following month, Andy McQueen, Ben Chaplin and Margo Martindale were announced to join the series.

=== Writing ===
The writers intended to use as many significant tropes associated with the Holy Grail, with Hernandez explaining, "one of the things that I think we all leaned into is this being a quest for the Holy Grail. Because [the show] centers on this algorithm which embraces, loves and repeat cliches, we looked at the Grail expectations." Both Hernandez and Lindelof settled on the idea that Simone wouldn't use faith as her coping mechanism, a concept that Lindelof explored in his previous series, "I'm using my belief as a way of coping with the mystery. But [Simone] doesn't have that mystery in her life."

== Critical reception ==
"Mother of Mercy: The Call of the Horse" received positive reviews from critics. Jenna Scherer of The A.V. Club gave the premiere an "A-" grade and wrote, "Bizarre, shaggy, funny, and surprisingly profound, Mrs. Davis isn't a show so much to be described as experienced."

Alan Sepinwall of Rolling Stone wrote, "The series constantly feels at war with itself creatively, as if no one involved quite knows exactly what they are making, or at least how to make what they want. But it's fascinating, charming, frequently hilarious, and at times surprisingly moving to watch them try." Sean T. Collins of Vulture gave the episode a 3 star rating out of 5 and wrote, "I'm happy to report that compared to all three of its predecessors, Mrs. Davis is shaping up to be a very minor work. No, really, I mean that as a compliment! It's just a fun story about a roguish nun with a grudge against stage magicians who gets recruited to find the Holy Grail to shut down the kindly artificial-intelligence algorithm that has conquered humanity. You know, the usual!"

Joel Keller of Decider wrote, "While the first episode of Mrs. Davis took a bit of effort to wrap our minds around, we were hooked on it by the end, thanks in no small part to Betty Gilpin's lead performance." Miles Surrey of The Ringer wrote, "Mrs. Davis won't be for everyone, but given the many WTF moments that make the show unlike anything else on television, it also won't be mistaken for something cooked up by an algorithm."
