= Stella Grace Fitzgerald =

American actress and model

- Fitzgerald at The Breadwinner premiere in Nashville on May 13, 2026
- Born: June 24, 2010 (age 16)

Stella Grace Fitzgerald (born June 24, 2010) is an American actress and model. She is best known for her role as Princess Issa in Zack Snyder's Netflix space opera film series Rebel Moon, as well as her film and television work including The Breadwinner, Mrs. Davis, and Chicago P.D.

== Early life and career ==
Fitzgerald began her career as a child model, appearing in numerous national commercial campaigns and print advertisements for major brands. She transitioned into acting, landing her first television role in 2021 as Becca Clarton in an episode of the NBC series Chicago P.D.

In 2023, she gained wider recognition for portraying Princess Issa in Zack Snyder's two-part Netflix epic Rebel Moon – Part One: A Child of Fire and Rebel Moon – Part Two: The Scargiver. Following her breakthrough, she appeared as a guest star playing a young version of Betty Gilpin's character on the Peacock series Mrs. Davis and portrayed a young Courtney Stodden in the Lifetime television film I Was a Child Bride: The Courtney Stodden Story.

Her film credits also include The Dancing Monkey—directed by Chandler Wilder and based on Eugene O'Neill's play The Hairy Ape—and the Sony feature comedy The Breadwinner (originally developed under the title A Friend Thing), starring alongside Nate Bargatze and Mandy Moore, in which she played Gracie Wilcox, the oldest daughter of Bargatze's character.

In addition to screen acting, Fitzgerald has been active in commercial and print modeling, working with major retail and fashion brands such as Zara, Gap, Abercrombie Kids, Calvin Klein, American Girl, Dick's Sporting Goods, and Kohl's. Outside of her performing career, she sings and plays guitar in a pop-rock band, plays flag football, and trains in martial arts.

== Filmography ==
=== Film ===
Year	Title	Role	Notes
2023	Rebel Moon – Part One: A Child of Fire	Princess Issa	Directed by Zack Snyder
2024	Rebel Moon – Part Two: The Scargiver	Princess Issa	Directed by Zack Snyder
2024	I Was a Child Bride: The Courtney Stodden Story	Young Courtney Stodden	Lifetime Feature
2025	The Dancing Monkey	Supporting Role	Based on The Hairy Ape
2026	The Breadwinner	Gracie Wilcox	Sony Feature Directed by Eric Appel

=== Television ===
Year	Title	Role	Notes
2021	Chicago P.D.	Becca Clarton	Episode: "The Radical Truth"
2023	Mrs. Davis	Young Lizzie	Recurring
