= Sam Meikle =

Australian writer and director (born 1971)

- Born: 1971 (age 54–55); Australia
- Occupations: screenwriter, director
- Father: Richard Meikle

Sam Meikle (born 1971) is an Australian writer and director best known for his work in television. He has won several Australian Writers' Guild Awards. He is the son of actor Richard Meikle.

== Filmography ==
=== Television ===
- Home and Away as James Fraser (1997, 1 episode)

== Writer ==
=== Film ===
- Sunday (2000, short film)
- Variety Show at the End of the World (2000, TV special)
- Bound (2000, short film)
- The Money Shot (2001, short film) - also director
- Melancholly (2001, short film) - also director
- The Easter Tide (2003, short film)
- Fatbelly: Chopper Unchopped (2009, documentary film)

=== Television ===
- All Saints (2003, S6E2: "Heroic Measures", S6E37: "Look Before You Leap")
- All Saints (2003–08, 11 episodes)
- Home and Away (2004–19, 228 episodes)
- Out of the Blue (2009, 12 episodes)
- Neighbours (2009–19, 83 episodes)
- Rescue: Special Ops (2010–11, 5 episodes)
- Crownies (2011, S1E19)
- Wild Boys (2011, S1E11)
- Vic the Viking (2013–14, 4 episodes)
- Tashi (2014, 2 episodes)
- Heidi (2015, S1E5: "The Treehouse Oath")
- Vikings: Athelstan's Journal (2015, web series, 13 episodes)
- Here Come the Habibs (2015, 3 episodes including: "Party Habibs Style")
- Texas Rising: The Lost Soldier (2015, miniseries, 9 episodes)
- House Husbands (2017, 1 episode)
- The Wild Adventures of Blinky Bill (2016–17)
- The Secret Daughter (2016–17, 12 episodes) - also creator
- Nate Is Late (2018–19, S1E20: "The Candy Factory", S1E27: "The Gremlins")
- Wakefield (2021, miniseries, 2 episodes)
- 100 Wolf: Legend of the Moonstone (2021, 2 episodes, S1E11: "Cherry, S1E24: "Swiss")
- MaveriX (2022–23, 10 episodes) - also creator

== Awards and nominations ==
Year	Award	Category	Work	Result
2009	AWGIE Awards	Television Serial	Out of the Blue (episode 4)	Nominated
2021	11th AACTA Awards	AACTA Award for Best Television Drama Series	Wakefield	Nominated
2022	12th AACTA Awards	AACTA Award for Best Children's Television Series	MaveriX	Nominated
