= Rebel Moon (soundtrack) =

Rebel Moon – Part One: A Child of Fire (Soundtrack from the Netflix Film)

Film score by Tom Holkenborg
- Released: December 15, 2023
- Recorded: August–October 2023
- Studios: Abbey Road Studios, London
- Genre: Film score
- Length: 57:25
- Label: Netflix Music
- Producer: Tom Holkenborg

Tom Holkenborg chronology
Three Thousand Years of Longing (2022)	Rebel Moon – Part One: A Child of Fire (2023)	Godzilla x Kong: The New Empire (2024)

Singles from Rebel Moon – Part One: A Child of Fire (Soundtrack from the Netflix Film)
- 1. "A Call to Courage" Released: November 24, 2023

Rebel Moon – Part One: A Child of Fire (Soundtrack from the Netflix Film) is the soundtrack to the 2023 film Rebel Moon directed, written and produced by Zack Snyder. Snyder's regular collaborator Tom Holkenborg scored the film's music; the 15-track album which contained cues from Holkenborg and the original song "Longhouse Dinner" performed by Allison Crowe was released on December 15, 2023, with the track "A Call to Courage" released as a single on November 24, 2023.

== Development ==
Tom Holkenborg composed the musical score for Rebel Moon; since his association with Snyder on the latter's production 300: Rise of an Empire (2014), Holkenborg continuously worked with Snyder on Batman v Superman: Dawn of Justice (2016), Zack Snyder's Justice League and Army of the Dead (both 2021). He was initially involved in the project since January 2023, when the film was produced as a single film. With the film being split into two-parts, the second being Part Two: The Scargiver (2024), Holkenborg would also contribute music to that film as well.

Holkenborg composed the film score in the sets of California during production. Describing it as an "advanced score with futuristic elements", Rebel Moon is also very grounded and earthy, as the film starts on an agricultural planet. Holkenborg used simple instruments underscoring the characters' principles, morals and humanity and used vocals to give their own signature and capture their individual journeys. The score was then recorded at the Abbey Road Studios in London during August and October 2023.

== Track listing ==
No.	Title	Artist(s)	Length
1.	"Prologue Antiphony"		2:15
2.	"The Wolf Who Became a Woman"		2:00
3.	"Scar Tissue"		6:25
4.	"Pueri Salvatoris"		2:37
5.	"Horselore"		2:48
6.	"A Call to Courage"		5:52
7.	"Ogumo (Cruel Mother)"		6:13
8.	"My Life for Hers"		3:32
9.	"The Weight of Lions"		2:33
10.	"The Burning Mountain"		4:07
11.	"A Child of War"		1:41
12.	"The Salt of Sarrow"		8:41
13.	"Little Knives"		2:15
14.	"A Good Place to Die"		5:27
15.	"Longhouse Dinner"	Allison Crowe	0:59
Total length:			57:25

== Reception ==
Kyle Wilson of Polygon described the score as it "sounds like Space Enya". Jeremy Mathai of /Film called the score as "propulsive, moody, and stirring" that is "impossible to recreate from one's laptop or living room TV". The Hollywood Reporter-based critic David Rooney criticised the music as "uninspiring".
