= Godzilla x Kong: The New Empire (soundtrack) =

Godzilla x Kong: The New Empire (Original Motion Picture Soundtrack)

Film score by Tom Holkenborg and Antonio Di Iorio
- Released: March 22, 2024
- Genre: Film score
- Length: 64:00
- Label: WaterTower Music

Tom Holkenborg chronology
Rebel Moon (2023)	Godzilla x Kong: The New Empire (2024)	Rebel Moon – Part Two: The Scargiver (2024)

Professional ratings
Review scores
Source	Rating
Soundtrack Universe	3.5/5 stars
Filmtracks	2/5 stars
Zanobard Reviews	8/10 stars

Godzilla x Kong: The New Empire (Original Motion Picture Soundtrack) is the soundtrack album to the 2024 American monster film Godzilla x Kong: The New Empire, composed by Tom Holkenborg and Antonio Di Iorio. Holkenborg, after composing the previous film, was confirmed to return to compose the film's score in August 2022, while in December 2023, Antonio Di Iorio would be announced to be co-composing the score with Holkenborg.

A single was released on March 13, 2024, titled “Main Title Theme.” The full soundtrack album was released on March 22, 2024 by WaterTower Music. “Rise Together”, composed by music producer Yaffle with singer Ai, is the theme song of the Japanese release.

== Overview ==
In August 2022, Tom Holkenborg was announced to return to compose the film's score, after previously doing so for Godzilla vs. Kong. In December 2023, it was announced that Antonio Di Iorio would co-compose the score with Holkenborg. A single was released on March 13, 2024, by WaterTower Music, titled “Main Title Theme.” The full soundtrack album was released on March 22, 2024.

The theme song of the Japanese release is “Rise Together” by Yaffle and Ai.

== Track listing ==
The official track list was unveiled on March 20, with a press release regarding the soundtrack release was confirmed by WaterTower Music on the same date.

All music is composed by Tom Holkenborg and Antonio Di Iorio.

Godzilla x Kong: The New Empire (Original Motion Picture Soundtrack)
No.	Title	Length
1.	"Main Title Theme"	2:50
2.	"Threatening Survival"	2:41
3.	"Monarch Base - Red Dream"	2:25
4.	"He's Arriving - Devastation"	2:58
5.	"Leaving Colosseum - New Dossier"	2:31
6.	"French Army"	2:39
7.	"Friendship"	2:19
8.	"New Entrances and Encounters"	2:33
9.	"Approaching the Lake"	1:57
10.	"Hollow Earth's Nature"	1:17
11.	"IWI Findings"	4:07
12.	"Ancient Creatures"	3:47
13.	"Memories Resurface"	2:43
14.	"Myth and Ritual"	2:47
15.	"New Kingdom"	2:40
16.	"Desperate Escape"	2:55
17.	"Broken"	2:15
18.	"Tech People Upgrade"	2:58
19.	"Divine and Glorious"	2:49
20.	"Egypt Fight"	2:32
21.	"Collapsing Gravity"	5:39
22.	"Frozen Rio"	3:51
23.	"You Are My Home"	1:39
Total length:		64:00

== Additional music ==
In the first trailer of Godzilla x Kong: The New Empire the song which is heard is Jim Reeves' version of "Welcome To My World." The song was first linked to the movie through one of the trailers. In the final cut, "Welcome To My World" can be heard during the opening scene and introduction to Hollow Earth. It plays as Kong runs through the Hollow Earth to introduce audiences to Kong's world. Other songs, which were heard in the movie are "I Got'Cha" by Greenflow, "Twilight Zone" by Golden Earring, "Hardwired" by Jordan F from The Guest, "Turn Me Loose" by Loverboy, "I Was Made For Lovin' You" by Kiss, "Day After Day" by Badfinger and finally "Samba Toff" by Orlann Divo.

== Reception ==
The score received mixed reviews from critics. Zanobard Reviews, giving a review of 8 out of 10, wrote: "Tom Holkenborg and Antonio Di Iorio’s thunderous Godzilla x Kong: The New Empire soundtrack acts as a louder, bolder older brother to GvK; the established Titan themes join forces with roaring new ones against the malevolent Skar King across this new album, making for some unapologetically epic and utterly deafening action setpieces as a result." Soundtrack Universe rated the score 3 and a half out of five, writing “Holkenborg and collaborator Di Iorio's score for Godzilla x Kong is a brawny, Saturday morning action cartoon styled romp with some surprisingly nuanced handling of thematic material accompanied by plenty of (slightly head scratching) retro 80's synth textures that is sure to please or annoy many.”

== Sources ==
- Kalat, David (2010). A Critical History and Filmography of Toho's Godzilla Series (Second ed.). McFarland. ISBN 9780786447497.
- Ryfle, Steve (1998). Japan's Favorite Mon-Star: The Unauthorized Biography of the Big G. ECW Press. ISBN 1550223488.
