= Tara Hernandez (writer) =

American television writer and producer

- Hernandez at WonderCon in 2019
- Education: Chapman University (BFA, 2010)
- Occupations: Television writer; producer; showrunner
- Years active: 2010–present
- Known for: The Big Bang Theory; Young Sheldon; Mrs. Davis

Tara Hernandez is an American television writer, producer and showrunner. She was a writer and co-executive producer on the CBS sitcom The Big Bang Theory and its spin-off Young Sheldon. She co-created the Peacock science-fiction series Mrs. Davis (2023) with Damon Lindelof and served as its showrunner. As of 2025, she was writing a live-action series adaptation of Captain Planet and the Planeteers for Netflix.

== Education ==
Hernandez graduated from Chapman University's Dodge College of Film and Media Arts in 2010 with a Bachelor of Fine Arts in film production.

== Career ==
=== The Big Bang Theory and Young Sheldon ===
After graduating, Hernandez was offered an interview with the executive producer and showrunner of The Big Bang Theory. She has said she was initially uninterested in television, describing herself as a "film snob". She was hired as an assistant to the show's executive producers, a role she held for two and a half seasons, during which she learned to pitch stories. After several of her pitches were produced, she was promoted to staff writer. She worked on the series for nine years, latterly as a co-executive producer. From 2018 to 2021 she was also a writer and co-executive producer on its spin-off Young Sheldon.

=== Mrs. Davis ===
Mrs. Davis grew out of a comedic script Hernandez had written about post-apocalyptic nuns. The script reached Susan Rovner, then an executive at Warner Bros. Television, who suggested Hernandez meet Lindelof; the pair met shortly before the onset of the COVID-19 pandemic and developed the project together during that period.

Rovner later brought the project with her to Peacock after leaving Warner Bros. to become chair of entertainment content at NBCUniversal Television and Streaming. In May 2021, Peacock gave the series a straight-to-series order of ten episodes, with Hernandez as showrunner and executive producer; both she and Lindelof were then under overall deals with Warner Bros. Television. Starring Betty Gilpin as a nun set on destroying an all-powerful artificial intelligence, the series premiered at SXSW in March 2023 before its first four episodes were released on Peacock on April 20, 2023. It ran for a single season of eight episodes. The series was well received by critics. It was nominated for the 2023 TCA Award for Outstanding New Program. Variety named Hernandez to its Variety500 list for 2023.

=== Captain Planet and the Planeteers ===
As of 2025, Hernandez was writing a live-action series adaptation of the animated series Captain Planet and the Planeteers for Netflix, in development with Greg Berlanti's Berlanti Productions, Leonardo DiCaprio's Appian Way and Warner Bros. Television.

=== The Tillbrooks ===
In December 2025, CBS ordered a pilot for Regency, a multi-camera family sitcom written and executive produced by Hernandez for Warner Bros. Television, placing it in contention for the 2026–27 broadcast season. The project put a period twist on the traditional family sitcom, following the upper-middle-class Tillbrooks family in 19th-century England. Rhys Darby was cast as patriarch Arthur Tillbrook, and Kate Walsh was cast opposite him in March 2026, by which time the project had been retitled The Tillbrooks. In April 2026, CBS declined to order the pilot to series, opting instead for the comedy Eternally Yours.

== Filmography ==
Television credits
Year(s)	Title	Network	Role	Notes
2010–2019	The Big Bang Theory	CBS	Assistant; writer; producer	Rose from assistant to co-executive producer
2018–2021	Young Sheldon	CBS	Writer; co-executive producer	
2023	Mrs. Davis	Peacock	Co-creator; writer; showrunner; executive producer	Co-created with Damon Lindelof; 8 episodes
2026	The Tillbrooks	CBS	Writer; executive producer	Unsold pilot; formerly titled Regency
TBA	Captain Planet and the Planeteers	Netflix	Writer	Live-action adaptation; in development
