= Wakefield (TV series) =

Australian TV drama series

- Promotional poster
- Genre: Drama
- Created by: Kristen Dunphy
- Written by: Kristen Dunphy; Sam Meikle; Joan Sauers; Cathy Strickland
- Directed by: Jocelyn Moorhouse; Kim Mordaunt
- Country of origin: Australia
- Original language: English
- No. of series: 1
- No. of episodes: 8

Production
- Executive producers: Chloe Rickard; Jason Burrows; Kristen Dunphy
- Producers: Shay Spencer; Ally Henville
- Production locations: Sydney; Southern Highlands; Blue Mountains
- Cinematography: Martin McGrath
- Running time: 60 minutes
- Production companies: Jungle Entertainment; BBC Studios

Original release
- Network: ABC
- Release: 2 April – 6 June 2021

Wakefield is an eight-part Australian television drama series that premiered on ABC iview on 2 April 2021 and was shown on ABC TV in weekly episodes from Sunday 18 April.

At the 2021 ARIA Music Awards, the music was nominated for Best Original Soundtrack, Cast or Show Album.

== Synopsis ==
Wakefield is a psychological mystery revolving around the staff and patients who populate Ward C of a psychiatric hospital in the Blue Mountains of New South Wales, centred on psychiatric nurse Nik.

== Cast ==
- Rudi Dharmalingam as Nikhil "Nik" Katira, a warm empathetic nurse at Wakefield Psychiatric Hospital, son of Indian immigrants Rashaal and Jeshna, and brother of Renuka
  - Kershawn Theodore as 12-year-old Nik
  - Nirish Bhat Surambadka as young Nik
- Geraldine Hakewill as Dr. Kareena Wells, the leading doctor of the ward, Nik's former fiancée, and wife of David
- Mandy McElhinney as Linda, acting Nursing Unit Manager
- Felicity Ward as Collette, a Wakefield nurse, friend of Nik, with a penchant for new age and self-development techniques
- Sam Simmons as Pete Seaman, a Wakefield nurse
- Pacharo Mzembe as Dr Rohan Achebe, a gaming-addicted doctor at Wakefield
- Dan Wyllie as James Matos, a businessman who continues to negotiate a property deal while a patient; husband of Leyla and father of Ted
- Shapoor Batliwalla as Rashaal Katira, Nikhil and Renuka's father
- Nadie Kammallaweera as Jeshna Katira, Nikhil and Renuka's mother and Rashaal's ex-wife
- Monica Kumar as Renuka, Nikhil's soon-to-be-married sister
- Harriet Dyer as Genevieve, patient with bipolar disorder, wife of Raff
- Ryan Corr as Raff, Genevieve's husband
- Harry Greenwood as Trevor, a patient whose psychosis has been exacerbated by taking crystal meth; singer/songwriter
- Bessie Holland as Tessa Knight, a milliner staying at Wakefield for her self-harm, anger issues, and compulsive hoarding; likes puzzles and art
- Kim Gyngell as Zelco, a professional musician staying at Wakefield
- Richie Miller as Omar, a Wakefield patient in a vegetative state, fiancé of Tamara
- Henry Nixon as David, Kareena's husband
- Colin Friels as Baz Madden, patient, a poet with anger issues
- Megan Smart as Ivy, a young mother to her two-month-old daughter Saskia staying at Wakefield due to her post-natal depression
- Sid Joshi
- Ursula Yovich as Maria, a mediator who negotiates with Petrov, Linda, and Collette to settle damages
- Shagun Garg
- Guy Simon as Colin/Mr Invisible, a patient who believes himself to be invisible
- Miritana Hughes as Seffa, a patient who believes he is a prophet of god
- Victoria Haralabidou as Cath, a patient who systematically organises the actions of every patient and employee at Wakefield
- Wayne Blair as Vince, a cockroach exterminator
- Heather Mitchell as Belle, Tessa's mother
- Jonathan Chan as Sun
- David Nash as Troy The Security Guard
- Matt Nable as Michael Fitzpatrick, a patient who believes himself to be disappeared Prime Minister Harold Holt
- Nicholas Brown as Kiran, husband-to-be of Renuka
- Skanda Jammalamadaka as Dilshan, Nikhil and Renuka's baby brother
- Caroline Brazier as Leyla Matos, wife of James
- Anthony Brandon Wong as James' business partner
- Veena Sudarshan as Geetha, Jeshna's friend
- Stephen Hunter as Stephan, Linda's date
- Alex Menglet as Petrov, a man whose car is deliberately damaged by Linda in a car park
- Michael-Anthony Taylor, as the father of Omar

== Episodes ==
No.	Title	Directed by	Written by	Original release date	Australia viewers
1	"Episode 1"	Jocelyn Moorhouse	Kristen Dunphy	2 April 2021(ABC iView); 18 April 2021 (ABC)	309,000
2	"Episode 2"	Jocelyn Moorhouse	Kristen Dunphy	2 April 2021(ABC iView); 25 April 2021 (ABC)	N/A
3	"Episode 3"	Jocelyn Moorhouse	Sam Meikle	2 April 2021(ABC iView); 2 May 2021 (ABC)	N/A
4	"Episode 4"	Kim Mordaunt	Joan Sauers	2 April 2021(ABC iView); 9 May 2021 (ABC)	N/A
5	"Episode 5"	Kim Mordaunt	Sam Meikle	2 April 2021(ABC iView); 16 May 2021 (ABC)	N/A
6	"Episode 6"	Kim Mordaunt	Cathy Strickland	2 April 2021(ABC iView); 23 May 2021 (ABC)	N/A
7	"Episode 7"	Jocelyn Moorhouse	Kristen Dunphy	2 April 2021(ABC iView); 30 May 2021 (ABC)	N/A
8	"Episode 8"	Jocelyn Moorhouse	Kristen Dunphy	2 April 2021(ABC iView); 6 June 2021 (ABC)	N/A

== Production ==
The eight-part series was filmed in 2020, at a number of locations in Australia: Sydney; the Blue Mountains; a New South Wales (NSW) northern rivers cane farm near Murwillumbah with Mt. Warning as a backdrop; and Southern Highlands of NSW. Wakefield is created by Kristen Dunphy, who is also the showrunner with Sam Meikle. The series is written by Kristen Dunphy, Sam Meikle, Joan Sauers and Cathy Strickland. It is directed by Jocelyn Moorhouse and Kim Mordaunt.

== International broadcast ==
Showtime acquired the U.S. broadcast rights for the series, which premiered on 18 October 2021.
