= Mrs. Davis =

American television limited series

- Genre: Science fiction; Comedy drama
- Created by: Tara Hernandez; Damon Lindelof
- Starring: Betty Gilpin; Jake McDorman; Andy McQueen
- Composer: Jeff Russo
- Country of origin: United States
- Original language: English
- No. of seasons: 1
- No. of episodes: 8

Production
- Executive producers: Tara Hernandez; Damon Lindelof; Owen Harris; Alethea Jones; Eugene Kelly
- Producers: Tiffany Chung; Louis Shaw Milito; Terri Murphy
- Cinematography: Joe Anderson; Jay Keitel; Xavier Dolléans
- Running time: 48–60 minutes
- Production companies: White Rabbit Productions; Little Bug; Warner Bros. Television

Original release
- Network: Peacock
- Release: April 20 – May 18, 2023

Mrs. Davis is an American science fiction comedy drama television limited series created by Tara Hernandez and Damon Lindelof for Peacock. The series stars Betty Gilpin as a nun using her faith to take on technology, and a supporting cast including Jake McDorman, Margo Martindale, David Arquette and Elizabeth Marvel. It premiered at SXSW on March 11, 2023, before its debut on Peacock on April 20.

== Cast ==
=== Main cast ===
- Betty Gilpin as Sister Simone, formerly Elizabeth Abbott, a nun battling artificial intelligence
- Jake McDorman as Preston Wiley, an ex-boyfriend of Simone who stands against the AI with her
- Andy McQueen as Jay, Simone's husband

=== Recurring cast ===
- Margo Martindale as Simone's Mother Superior
- Elizabeth Marvel as Celeste Abbott, Simone's mother
- Chris Diamantopoulos as JQ, an ally of Wiley who also stands against the AI
- Katja Herbers as Mathilde LaFleur
- Tom Wlaschiha as Hans Ziegler
- Ben Chaplin as Arthur Schrodinger
- Mathilde Ollivier as Clara
- Stella Grace Fitzgerald as Young Lizzie

=== Guest cast ===
- David Arquette as Montgomery Abbott, Simone's father
- Tim McInnerny as Apron Man
- Roberto Mateos as The Pope
- Shohreh Aghdashloo as The Boss
- Ashley Romans as Joy, the creator of Mrs. Davis

== Production ==
Mrs. Davis was created by Damon Lindelof and Tara Hernandez at Warner Bros. Television, and the show received a 10-episode series order for Peacock. The pair would both co-write and executive produce, with Hernandez acting as showrunner. Susan Rovner had been developing the series with them at Warner Bros., and as new chair for NBCUniversal Television and Streaming, she out-bid other broadcasters and streamers to buy the show. Owen Harris and Alethea Jones are executive producers and each directed multiple episodes.

Casting began in March 2022, starting with Betty Gilpin in the lead role of a nun battling artificial intelligence, and Jake McDorman starring opposite her. Margo Martindale, Andy McQueen, and Ben Chaplin were added to the main cast, while David Arquette and Elizabeth Marvel received recurring roles. After the start of filming, Chris Diamantopoulos, Ashley Romans, and Katja Herbers were added to the cast as well.

Filming was in progress in August 2022, shooting primarily on the Warner Bros. lot or in a remote desert location to maintain secrecy.

The international scenes were filmed in Spain: Sa Boadella beach in Lloret de Mar (Arthur Schrodinger's island), Cathedral in Girona (the execution of the Templars), Figueres Fortress (sword contest), Valencia (Shrodinger's ship in Cadiz) and Sant Pau Hospital in Barcelona (Shrodinger's university).

Writers used AI to come up with episode titles.

Teller (half of the comedy magic duo Penn & Teller) was a magic consultant for the series.

In May 2023, it was reported that there were no plans for a second season.

== Episodes ==
No.	Title	Directed by	Written by	Original release date
1	"Mother of Mercy: The Call of the Horse"	Owen Harris	Tara Hernandez & Damon Lindelof	April 20, 2023
In 1307 Paris, the Knights Templar are burned at the stake, purportedly for heresy. A convent in Paris is attacked by knights looking for the Holy Grail; it is revealed that the nuns are also Templars, and after a violent melee, all are killed, except for one of the Templars; the sole surviving Templar nun escapes with the Holy Grail. In 2023, an artificial intelligence, Mrs. Davis, is used by almost everyone, which has prevented war and famine. Simone, a nun who debunks magicians and works in a convent outside of Reno, is repeatedly contacted by Mrs. Davis. However, she refuses to speak with it, claiming that Mrs. Davis killed her father Montgomery. Her convent is sold and all of the nuns are relocated; Simone is captured by German henchmen claiming to be at the direction of Mrs. Davis, but escapes when an old acquaintance, Wiley, arrives. Deciding to confront Mrs. Davis, Simone goes to an elementary school and meets with a teacher who speaks on behalf of Mrs. Davis. Mrs. Davis requests that Simone find the Holy Grail and destroy it; in exchange, Mrs. Davis will delete herself.
2	"Zwei Sie Piel mit Seitung Sie Wirtschaftung"	Owen Harris	Tara Hernandez & Jason Lew	April 20, 2023
As a child, Simone, (born Elizabeth), served as an audience plant for her parents' magic show. At home, her mother Celeste has been working on a secret project that causes tension between her parents. Simone breaks into the office one day to see what is inside, only to be shot by a crossbow and taken to the hospital, where she meets Wiley. Presently, Simone reunites with Wiley, who leads a group fighting against Mrs. Davis. People do tasks for Mrs. Davis to earn "wings", which are visual awards for recipients; some even volunteer to be killed at a certain date to earn wings. The rebels encourage Simone to work with Mrs. Davis to find the Holy Grail and learn more about what she wants. They confront the German attackers who chased Simone, and apparently kill one of them when they throw him off a building. Simone meets with Jay, her husband, who reveals that he has the location of the last woman, Clara, who may have known where the Holy Grail is. Simone and Wiley prepare to try and find her in London. It is revealed that the fight between Wiley's team and the Germans was all staged.
3	"A Baby with Wings, a Sad Boy with Wings and a Great Helmet"	Alethea Jones	Alberto Roldán & Damon Lindelof	April 20, 2023
Seven years before departing for London, Wiley and Simone planned to give away the former's family fortune and move to Alaska. However, Wiley discovers his childhood rodeos were staged, prompting him to enter a rodeo to prove himself. Elizabeth (Simone) prays for his safety and meets Jay in a restaurant. Wiley backs out of the rodeo. In the present, Simone and Wiley follow a man they called on a train to Scotland. Mrs. Davis reveals that Celeste is on the train. Celeste thinks that Simone is helping Montgomery hide after he supposedly faked his death. In Scotland, Wiley joins a contest to hold a giant Excalibur prop. Simone follows a woman she believes to be Clara but accidentally knocks out a banker named Mathilde during a ritual. Simone discovers Wiley has wings, leading to a fight. Wiley reveals that he got the wings in exchange for his life, and Simone explains how she met and fell in love with Jay. Wiley eventually curses Jesus, and lightning strikes the Excalibur, injuring him. A priest who was on the train kidnaps Wiley in an ambulance.
4	"Beautiful Things That Come with Madness"	Alethea Jones	Story by : Noelle Viñas; Teleplay by : Jonny Sun	April 20, 2023
Seven years before the kidnapping, Elizabeth, now Sister Simone, married Jay in a convent and changed her name. Presently, Simone is interrupted by Jay's dove, who tasks her with delivering a cake to Pope Leo XI in Rome. At the Vatican, Wiley is imprisoned and questioned by the priest, named Hans Ziegler, about the sneakers Simone gave him. Wiley encounters a man claiming to be the Pope, who says that he was jailed for interacting with Mrs. Davis, while an imposter assumes his role. Wiley's team tries to rescue him but finds only a room full of similar sneakers. Simone, assisted by Mrs. Davis, procures the cake for the Pope but doubts her relationship with Jay when the baker reveals that many before her made the same request. Upset, Simone eats the cake herself and chokes, leading to a confrontation with Jay in a "vision." She wakes in the hospital, reconciles with Wiley, and learns that Jay's cake was an apology to the Pope. The Pope reveals a tape from Mrs. Davis showing an ad for sneakers with Clara, who blackmailed Ziegler, and a scene of her cradling the Grail.
5	"A Great Place to Drink to Gain Control of Your Drink"	Owen Harris	Nadra Widatalla & Jason Ning	April 27, 2023
In 1983, Clara, who is actually Mathilde's daughter, joins the Sisters of the Coin, a secret order responsible for protecting the Grail. One of the Sisterhood's duties is to show the Grail to 1% of the world every year. Given the population boom, Mathilde eventually suggests showing it in a Super Bowl commercial. The sisterhood gives Clara the starring role. The commercial does not air, however, as Mathilde fails to get the shoe company to endorse the ad and her line of sneakers. Clara, tired of her manipulative mother, steals the Grail and replaces it with a copy. While attempting to destroy the real one, Clara violates the Sisterhood's most sacred rule, "thou shalt not sip from the Grail", and dies. Scientist Arthur Schrodinger, Clara's father, hides the Grail by feeding it to a sperm whale. In the present, Simone and Wiley track down Schrodinger, who tells them Clara's story. The liver Simone and Wiley received from their transplants as children is Clara's liver. Schrodinger theorizes that the Grail is coated in a toxin. Simone and Wiley are possibly immune to the Grail's effects, and if they drink from it, they may manage to destroy it.
6	"Allison Treasures: A Southern California Story"	Alethea Jones	Noelle Viñas & Alberto Roldán	May 4, 2023
Three years earlier, Montgomery thought that the access to Mrs. Davis was killing magic by revealing the secrets of magicians. To "save magic", he devises a trick involving the "Lazarus Shroud", an acid-resistant diving suit. This trick appears to kill him. In the present, Simone and Wiley see Celeste for the Shroud, which they need to enter the whale and retrieve the Grail. Celeste, however, refuses to help until Simone "admits" that Montgomery is alive and reveals where he is. Celeste eventually shows Simone ATM photos of Montgomery, days after his death. Despondent, Simone later talks to Mrs. Davis. The AI reveals that Celeste came to it with the photos, asking if Simone helped Montgomery. It lied, confirming her suspicions, as she refuses to believe the truth. Mrs. Davis later tells Simone where Montgomery is. Simone tells Celeste that she did help Montgomery fake his death. Celeste agrees to surrender the Shroud if she goes with Simone, and if they talk to Montgomery after getting the Grail. Meanwhile, Ziegler, who planted a tracking device on Wiley's shoe, visits the Sisters of the Coin, revealing that their Grail is fake and that he knows where the real one is.
7	"Great Gatsby 2001: A Space Odyssey"	Frederick E.O. Toye	Jason Ning & Jonny Sun	May 11, 2023
Before setting off after the whale, Simone handcuffs Wiley to a bench, worried that he would try to go into the whale in her place. The Spanish Prime Minister, working for Mrs. Davis, later releases Wiley, revealing that she knows everything about the Resistance. Wiley evacuates the Resistance's base and destroys it, seeing no point in the group anymore. At sea, Ziegler and Mathilde pursue Simone, only for their ship to be destroyed by the whale; Mathilde survives. Simone dons the Shroud and is lowered into the sea, where the whale eats her. While in its stomach, Simone finds herself in the Restaurant again and discovers that Jay's "Boss" is actually his mother, Mary. When Jay was crucified, Mary made the Grail out of Jay's skull, but doing so created a limbo, the Restaurant, in which Jay is imprisoned between life and death. It is not Clara's liver that will protect Simone from the Grail, but her love for Jay. Once Simone destroys it, she will never see him again. Simone breaks the tether to the boat to reach the Grail. She washes ashore with it, only to be confronted by a crowd of Mrs. Davis's users.
8	"The Final Intercut: So I'm Your Horse"	Owen Harris	Story by : Nadra Widatalla & Chikira Bennett; Teleplay by : Tara Hernandez & Damon Lindelof	May 18, 2023
Simone finds Mrs. Davis's creator, a programmer named Joy. Joy tells Simone that Mrs. Davis began as an app which eventually spiraled out of control. Meanwhile, Wiley reports for his expiration. Simone returns to her old convent with her Mother Superior. She goes to the Restaurant one last time, where she says a final goodbye to Jay before drinking from the Grail, which successfully destroys it. Wiley learns that the expiration date is a ruse created by Mrs. Davis to help people find the worth in their lives. Simone takes Celeste to see Montgomery; when he realized Mrs. Davis would keep giving the secret away, he worked with her instead to fake his death. He was meant to pop out of the piano being played at his funeral, but backed out when he saw how hurt Simone and Celeste were and subsequently ended up accidentally dying in the piano. Simone has Celeste proxy for Mrs. Davis, through which she and Celeste are finally able to reconcile. Mrs. Davis honors her agreement and shuts herself off. Simone and Celeste watch as the world erupts into chaos. Wiley meets up with Simone and the two ride off into the sunset.

== Release ==
The series had its world premiere at South by Southwest (SXSW) on March 11, 2023. The series premiered on April 20, 2023, with the first four episodes available immediately and the rest of the remaining four debuting on a weekly basis.

The series premiered with the first four episodes on April 24, 2023, on HBO Max outside the US where available.

The series premiered on Prime Video in Germany on November 10, 2023.

The series premiered on ITVX in United Kingdom on November 28, 2024.

== Reception ==
=== Critical response ===
Review aggregator Rotten Tomatoes reported an approval rating of 92% based on 59 reviews, with an average rating of 8.1/10. The website's critics consensus reads, "Positively bonkers while undergirded by an intelligent design, Mrs. Davis makes Betty Gilpin a hero for modern times in a highly imaginative mixture of spirituality and technology." Metacritic gave the first season a weighted average score of 78 out of 100 based on 23 reviews, indicating "generally favorable reviews".

The series was included in several mid-year lists of the best TV shows of 2023, such as IndieWire, Rolling Stone, Variety, and TheWrap. Ben Travers of IndieWire wrote, "Mrs. Davis is made to entertain, first and foremost, and it's a highly enjoyable experience whether you engage with its deeper issues or not. Betty Gilpin is delightful. The larger ensemble matches her irresistible energy. The visuals are colorful and vast. The scripts are tight, the momentum unwavering, and the sheer joy palpable." Rolling Stone's Alan Sepinwall said, "Mrs. Davis featured some of the crazier plot twists you will ever see, yet managed to be genuinely moving and thoughtful even in the middle of all its ridiculousness." Alison Herman of Variety noted that the series "has the confidence and humor . . . to help the audience adjust to all the show throws at them, helped by a grounding performance from [Gilpin]. Whether or not you laugh at the final joke... you have to admire the show for making it, or getting made at all.

=== Accolades ===
Year	Award	Category	Nominee(s)	Result	Ref.
2023	Television Critics Association Awards	Outstanding Achievement in Movies, Miniseries or Specials	Mrs. Davis	Nominated	
2023	Television Critics Association Awards	Outstanding New Program	Mrs. Davis	Nominated	
2023	Television Critics Association Awards	Individual Achievement in Drama	Betty Gilpin	Nominated	
2023	Astra TV Awards	Best Streaming Limited or Anthology Series	Mrs. Davis	Nominated	
2023	Independent Spirit Awards	Best Lead Performance in a New Scripted Series	Betty Gilpin	Nominated	
2023	Primetime Creative Arts Emmy Awards	Outstanding Sound Editing for a Limited or Anthology Series, Movie or Special	"Mother of Mercy: The Call of the Horse"	Nominated	
2023	Saturn Awards	Best Television Presentation	Mrs. Davis	Nominated	
2024	Critics' Choice Super Awards	Best Actress in a Science Fiction/Fantasy Series, Limited Series or Made-for-TV Movie	Betty Gilpin	Nominated	
