= Staz Nair =

British actor and singer

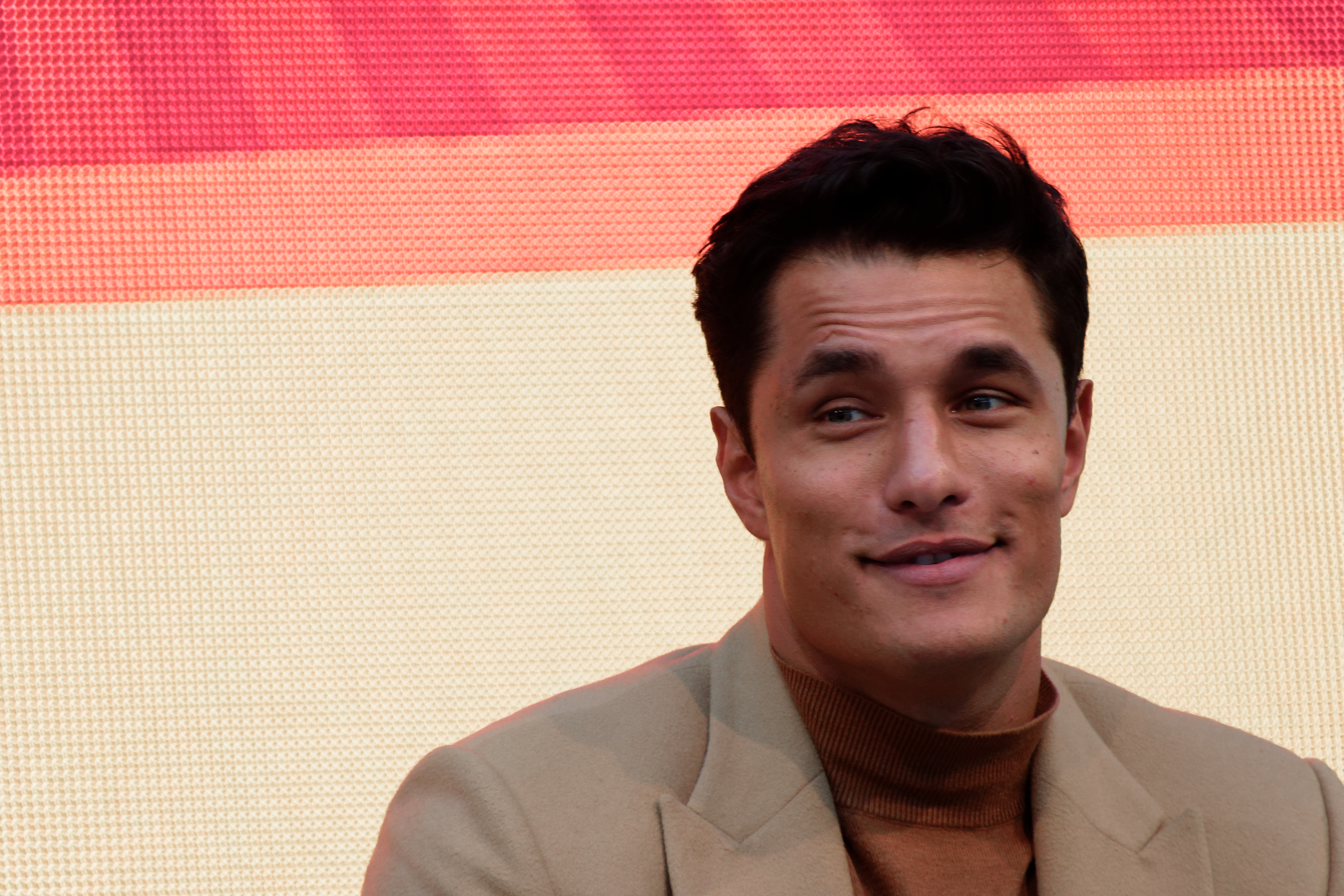
- Nair in 2018
- Born: 17 June 1991 (age 35); London, England, United Kingdom
- Occupations: Actor; singer
- Years active: 2012–present

Staz Nair (born 17 June, 1991) is a British actor and singer. He is known for his roles as Qhono in the HBO fantasy series Game of Thrones (2016–2019), William Dey in the CW superhero series Supergirl (2019–2021), the titular role of DCI Harry Virdee in the BBC One crime drama Virdee (2025), and Tarak in Netflix's Rebel Moon films.

== Early life and education ==
Staz Nair is of Indian and Russian descent and describes himself as "half Malayali".

He was educated at Dr Challoner's Grammar School, a state grammar school for boys, in the market town of Amersham, in Buckinghamshire.

== Career ==
=== Music ===
Nair was a member of the trio band Times Red. The band were contestants in the ninth series of the British music competition television series The X Factor in 2012. They advanced to the judges' houses stage, but did not advance to the live shows, despite being the wildcard for the Groups category and Times Red finished third in the wildcard public vote to be the thirteenth act in the live shows receiving 12.5% behind Amy Mottram and Christopher Maloney. The band released two singles, titled "Just No Good for Me", and "Not Listening" in 2013.

=== Acting ===
Nair joined the fantasy drama television series Game of Thrones beginning in its sixth season as Qhono, a Dothraki army chief. He portrayed the titular Rocky in the television film The Rocky Horror Picture Show: Let's Do the Time Warp Again, which premiered on Fox in October 2016.

In 2019, Nair portrayed Dax-Baron, the man who would become the supervillain Doomsday, in the series Krypton. He became a main cast member of the superhero television series Supergirl during its fifth and sixth seasons in 2019, portraying a character created for the series: "hardened reporter" William Dey. Nair appeared in the space opera film Rebel Moon, directed by Zack Snyder.

Nair plays DCI Harry Virdee in the BBC One crime drama Virdee, which premiered in February 2025.

== Filmography ==
=== Film ===
Year	Title	Role	Notes	Ref.
2015	Bazodee	Bharat Kumar		
2020	Star	Clint Orris	Short film	
2023	Rebel Moon – Part One: A Child of Fire (Note: The R-rated director's cut is retitled Rebel Moon – Chapter One: Chalice of Blood)	Tarak Decimus		
2024	Rebel Moon – Part Two: The Scargiver (Note: The R-rated director's cut is retitled Rebel Moon – Chapter Two: Curse of Forgiveness)	Tarak Decimus		
TBA	Harvest Moon	Staz	Post-production	
TBA	And Then the Tide Came In	Leon	Short film. Post-production	

=== Television ===
Year	Title	Role	Notes	Ref.
2012	The X Factor	Himself - Contestant	Series 9 - Nair was part of the band Times Red	
2016	The Rocky Horror Picture Show: Let's Do the Time Warp Again	Rocky	Television film	
2016–2019	Game of Thrones	Qhono	Recurring role (seasons 6–8; 11 episodes)	
2018	Humans	Gordon	Series 3; episodes 1–5	
2018	Lady Parts	Ahsan Alkaaf	Pilot for the series We Are Lady Parts	
2019	Krypton	Dax-Baron / Doomsday	Episode: "Zods and Monsters"	
2019–2021	Supergirl	William Dey	Main cast (seasons 5–6); 39 episodes	
2024	The Faceless Lady	Unknown role	VR miniseries	
2025	Virdee	DCI Harry Virdee	Main role; 6 episodes	
