= List of films split into multiple parts =

Over the history of cinema, some films have been split into multiple parts. This has been done for creative, practical, and financial reasons. Originally done in the form of low-budget serial films, more recently it has often been done with big-budget feature films.

== History ==
Early examples were serials, which were produced in chapters of 10–30 minutes each, and presented in theaters one each week as a prelude to feature films on the same ticket. With each episode typically ending in a cliffhanger, they encouraged regular attendance at the cinema, and the short running length kept down the cost of each installment, and the number of reels needed to show them.

Later feature films would be produced with a similar strategy in mind, deliberately setting up plot developments to be developed in subsequent features. When the initial film has been highly successful, additional installments may be produced concurrently, taking advantage of economies of scale and the availability of actors and directors to facilitate production. (e.g. The Matrix, Back to the Future)

A common reason for splitting a film has been to accommodate an extended running time; many people would find it uncomfortable to sit for a single three- or four-hour presentation. Some films have addressed this by adopting a practice typical in stage theater: having an intermission at the approximate midpoint of the film, during which members of the audience can stand and walk around, use the restroom if needed, or get a snack or refill their beverage at the concession stand. (e.g. Gandhi, Gods and Generals) Other directors have instead split the film into separate releases. (e.g. Kill Bill)

In the 21st century, it became increasingly common for big-budget films – usually those based on novels which might otherwise have to be substantially condensed, but especially the last in a series – to be released as multiple features. The film adaptation of Harry Potter and the Deathly Hallows was one of the first to do so with the final book in a series, a pattern followed by the Twilight, The Hunger Games, and Divergent series. Peter Jackson's film adaptation of The Hobbit – a final follow-up to his The Lord of the Rings series – was released as three separate features.

== Criticism ==
In many cases, the process of splitting films has been criticized, citing financial motivations in turning successful books into longer film series. In 2012, the Australian Broadcasting Corporation called it "a recent Hollywood trend of splitting a single book into multiple movies to maximise box office returns from blockbuster franchises". The Hobbit proved particularly controversial as its source material is shorter than the individually-adapted volumes of The Lord of the Rings and was extended into a trilogy by adding material that was not part of the original book.

== Notable examples ==
- Die Nibelungen were fantasy epics directed by Fritz Lang in 1924. The first half of the film is called Die Nibelungen: Siegfried and the second half of the film is called Die Nibelungen: Kriemhilds Rache (Kriemhild's Revenge).
- Marcel Pagnol's 1952 film Manon of the Spring (Manon des sources) originally premiered as a two-part, four-hour film. It was later reduced to three hours, then further edited into a single, 90-minute film. Pagnol eventually adapted and expanded the film's story into the 1962, two-volume novel The Water of the Hills. In 1968, he edited the original four-hour version of his film into an 18-episodes television miniseries. In 1986, the novel was adapted into a two-part film, Jean de Florette and Manon of the Spring (Manon des sources).
- The Soviet war drama film War and Peace was released in four parts in 1966 and 1967.
- A Touch of Zen, was originally released in two parts in 1970 and 1971 running for a total of 200 minutes. A version combining the two parts was released later in 1971 with a runtime of 180 minutes.
- The Three Musketeers and The Four Musketeers were originally filmed as one film adapting the novel by Alexandre Dumas, but were released as separate films in 1973 and 1974.
- Polish historical drama film The Deluge from 1974 was split into two parts, due to its length (over 5 hours).
- Bernardo Bertolucci's 317-minute-long epic historical drama film 1900 (Novecento) was originally presented in two parts upon its European theatrical release (the American release was edited into a single 247-minute version); this presentation was preserved for most of the film's DVD and Blu-ray releases, which present both parts on separate discs.
- In 1987, a nearly six-hour film adaptation of Charles Dickens' novel Little Dorrit was released; it was split into two parts released simultaneously.
- In 1989, The Toxic Avenger Part II and The Toxic Avenger Part III: The Last Temptation of Toxie were produced as one film but later re-edited into two.
- The Lord of the Rings is a three part adaptation of J. R. R. Tolkien's book series The Lord of the Rings. The Fellowship of the Ring, The Two Towers and The Return of the King were released at one-year intervals beginning in December 2001.
- Kill Bill by Quentin Tarantino was originally planned as one film, but was split into two films – Volume 1 and Volume 2, released six months apart in 2003 and 2004 – to avoid cutting it to a shorter length.
- The Japanese epic film trilogy The Human Condition, directed by Masaki Kobayashi and based on the six-volume novel by Junpei Gomikawa, had a run time of almost ten hours as a single film, resulting in the one film being split into three; Volume 1, No Greater Love, was released in 1959, Volume 2, Road to Eternity, also in 1959, and Volume 3, A Soldier's Prayer, in 1961. These were also further split into two parts each for a total of 6 films for the Japanese theatrical release.
- Pirates of the Caribbean: At World's End is a direct continuation of Dead Man's Chest, partly due to both films being in production back-to-back. Dead Man's Chest released in 2006, and At World's End a year later in 2007.
- Harry Potter and the Deathly Hallows of the Harry Potter film series was one of the first franchise novels split into multiple parts. Part 1 was released in November 2010 and Part 2 was released in July 2011.
- The Matrix Reloaded and The Matrix Revolutions were shot back-to-back and released six months apart in 2003, with Revolutions picking up immediately where Reloaded ended.
- In 2010, Indian film Rakta Charitra was released as two films back-to-back months apart.
- In 2012, Indian films Gangs of Wasseypur – Part 1 and Gangs of Wasseypur – Part 2 were originally shot as a single film of 319 minutes, but since no Indian cinema would screen a film of that length, it was divided into two parts (160 mins and 159 minutes) for the Indian market.
- Breaking Dawn of the Twilight film series was split into two parts. Part 1 was released in November 2011 and Part 2 in November 2012.
- Batman: The Dark Knight Returns is a two-part animated adaptation of Frank Miller's graphic novel of the same name, made for video. The first part was released in 2012, and the second in 2013. A Deluxe Edition combining both parts into an unabridged film was released in late 2013.
- Nymphomaniac was originally intended to be a single film, but, because of its four-hour length, Lars von Trier made the decision to split the project into two separate films.
- The Hobbit is a three-part adaptation of J. R. R. Tolkien's novel The Hobbit. As director Peter Jackson developed the script, the additional material added from Tolkien's notes and The Lord of the Rings Appendices required splitting the single planned film into two parts, and later, into three. An Unexpected Journey, The Desolation of Smaug, and The Battle of the Five Armies were released at one-year intervals beginning in December 2012.
- The film adaptation of The Hunger Games novel Mockingjay is split into two parts with Part 1 released in November 2014 and Part 2 in November 2015.
- Attack on Titan, a live-action film adaptation of the manga series, was split into two parts, both released a month apart in 2015.
- The film adaptation of Stephen King's novel It is split into two parts with Chapter One released in September 2017 and Chapter Two in September 2019.
- An anime film adaptation of Haikara-San: Here Comes Miss Modern was split into two parts with Part 1 released in 2017, and Part 2 in 2018.
- Code Geass Lelouch of the Rebellion, an anime compilation film of the anime television series of the same name was split into three parts: Initiation was released on 21 October 2017, Transgression was released on 10 February 2018, and Glorification was released on 26 May 2018.
- Blood-Club Dolls, a live-action film of Blood-C anime series was split into two parts: 1 was released on 13 October 2018, and 2 was released on 11 July 2020.
- KGF were Kannada language period action film series written and created by Prashanth Neel. KGF Chapter 1 was released on 21 December 2018 while KGF Chapter 2 was released on 14 April 2022.
- Avengers: Endgame is a direct continuation of Infinity War and was subtitled Infinity War – Part 2 at one point in its development. Infinity War was released on 27 April 2018 and Endgame a year later on 26 April 2019.
- The biography of N. T. Rama Rao was originally supposed to be a single film but because of its length, it was split into the films NTR: Kathanayakudu and NTR: Mahanayakudu. Both were released one month apart in January and February 2019.
- Sailor Moon Eternal is a two-part anime film that is a direct continuation (and a "fourth season") for the Sailor Moon Crystal anime series. Both were released in January and February 2021.
  - Sailor Moon Cosmos, a sequel to Sailor Moon Eternal (and a "fifth and final season" for Sailor Moon Crystal) is also presented in two parts, with both films releasing in June 2023.
- The 2021 film Dune is an adaptation of Frank Herbert's 1965 science-fiction novel. However, it is titled onscreen as Dune: Part One as it only adapts the first half of Herbert's novel. A sequel titled Dune: Part Two was released in March 2024, adapting the second half of Herbert's novel.
- The film adaptation of the novel Ponniyin Selvan was split into two parts, the first being 167 minutes and the second being 165 minutes, with release dates 30 September 2022 and 28 April 2023 respectively.
- The sequel to Spider-Man: Into the Spider-Verse was split into two parts as Spider-Man: Across the Spider-Verse with Part One releasing on June 2, 2023, and Part Two set to release a year later on March 29, 2024 before it was removed from Sony's release calendar due to the 2023 SAG-AFTRA strike. Initially promoted as Part One, this was later removed from the title of Across the Spider-Verse, while the second was renamed to Spider-Man: Beyond the Spider-Verse.
- The seventh film in the Mission: Impossible franchise, Mission: Impossible – Dead Reckoning Part One was planned to be shot back-to-back with Mission: Impossible – The Final Reckoning, initially intended to be titled Dead Reckoning Part Two, but was retitled after its predecessor dropped the Part One from the title. However, plans for the film changed in February 2021. Part One was released on July 12, 2023, while The Final Reckoning was released on May 23, 2025.
- Rebel Moon was originally pitched as a singular film, which concerned Netflix Films chairman Scott Stuber due to its length. Unwilling to "lose all the character", director Zack Snyder then decided to split the film into two parts, respectively titled A Child of Fire and The Scargiver.
- Based on Ugramm and directed by Prashanth Neel, the Indian film Salaar was announced as a single movie. On 8 July 2023, Hombale Films revealed that Salaar would be released in two parts. Salaar: Part 1 – Ceasefire was released on 22 December 2023. The Part 2 – Shouryaanga Parvam will be released in the latter half of 2025.
- Horizon: An American Saga, a film by Kevin Costner, is a planned four-part film with the first film being released in June 2024. Costner plans for two more films. Due to the poor performance, Warner Bros. Pictures cancelled the August 2024 theatrical release for the second film, and has been delayed for now until they can schedule a theatrical release date for the near future.
- The Broadway musical Wicked was adapted into two films, with the first part released in November 2024 and the second (subtitled For Good) released in November 2025.
- Demon Slayer: Kimetsu no Yaiba - The Movie: Infinity Castle, set to be one big story split into three epic movies, with the first one being titled Akaza Returns released in 2025. The second part will be released in 2027, and the third part in 2029.
- Dhurandhar (2025), a Hindi spy thriller was intended to be one 3.5 hour film, but director Aditya Dhar and Jio Studios decided to split the film into two parts to accommodate all the plot points and resolve them. Part 2, titled Dhurandhar: The Revenge, was released on 19 March 2026.

== Incomplete multi-part films ==
Some multi-part films have been ended up being unfinished due to the cancelation of the second part. Examples include the following:

- The 1978 animated film adaptation of The Lord of the Rings, directed by Ralph Bakshi, was originally set to be split into two parts, but for various reasons, the sequel was never made.
- The 2000 film adaptation of Battlefield Earth was set to be split into two parts. The first part was released in May 2000 and the sequel was set to be released in May 2002, but because of the first film's bad reviews and poor box-office performance, the sequel was permanently canceled.
- The film adaptation of the third Divergent novel Allegiant was set to be split into two parts: Allegiant released in March 2016 and Ascendant was set to be released on 9 June 2017. Due to Allegiant's poor box office performance, a theatrical release for Ascendant was dropped in favor of reconfiguring the project as a television film for Starz that would be followed by a spinoff series. Both projects were later canceled, effectively ending the franchise.

== See also ==
- Back-to-back film production
- List of films produced back-to-back
- Split television season
