= Defining Moments (film) =

- Directed by: Stephen Wallis
- Written by: Stephen Wallis
- Produced by: Susan Ilott; Michael Godfrey; Angelo Paletta; James Robson; Stephen Wallis
- Starring: Burt Reynolds; Graham Greene; Sienna Guillory
- Release date: August 27, 2021
- Running time: 88 minutes
- Country: Canada
- Language: English

Defining Moments is a 2021 Canadian comedy film written and directed by Stephen Wallis, and starring Burt Reynolds (in his final film role), Graham Greene and Sienna Guillory.

== Plot ==
Life comes down to a defining moment, a single memory that determines who you'll be. Jack must decide to spend the rest of his life with his girlfriend, Terri. Marina must reconnect with her aging father. Laurel must come to terms with her father's Alzheimer's disease. A snapshot of several families thrust into their defining moments.

== Cast ==
- Burt Reynolds as Chester
- Graham Greene as Dr. Kelly
- Sienna Guillory as Lisa
- Tammy Blanchard as Laurel
- Eric Peterson as Edward
- Shawn Roberts as Jack
- Polly Shannon as Marina
- Dillon Casey as Dave
- Andy McQueen as Peter
- Nicholas Campbell as Foddy

== Production ==
Filming occurred in Unionville, Ontario, and Markham, Ontario, and wrapped in September 2017.

== Release ==
The film was released in theaters and on-demand August 27, 2021.
