= MaveriX =

Australian children's television series

- Genre: Drama
- Created by: Rachel Clements; Sam Meikle; Isaac Elliott
- Written by: Sam Meikle; Fin Edquist; Michelle Offen; Kelly Schilling; Sarinah Masukor
- Directed by: Isaac Elliott; Ian Watson; Geoff Bennett
- Country of origin: Australia
- Original language: English
- No. of seasons: 1
- No. of episodes: 10

Production
- Executive producers: Bernadette O’Mahony; Mary-Ellen Mullane
- Producers: Rachel Clements; Trisha Morton-Thomas
- Production location: Alice Springs
- Running time: 26 minutes
- Production company: Brindle Films

Original release
- Network: ABC Me
- Release: April 1, 2022 – present

MaveriX is an Australian drama TV series aimed at children and young teenagers which premiered on ABC Me on 1 April 2022.

== Synopsis ==
The series follows the story of a group of junior motocross riders who are selected for the first ever MaveriX Academy in Alice Springs, the home of dirtbike racing in Australia. The six teens are pushed to their limits, and the academy ultimately gives them the chance to join a professional racing team.

== Production ==
MaveriX is written by Sam Meikle, Fin Edquist, Michelle Offen and Kelly Schilling. The 10-part series is produced by Rachel Clements and Trisha Morton-Thomas at Brindle Films. The executive producers are Bernadette O’Mahony and creators Rachel Clements, Sam Meikle and Isaac Elliott. MaveriX was filmed in Alice Springs in 2021.

== Cast ==
- Darcy Tadich as Scott
- Tatiana Goode as Jenny
- Sam Winspear-Schillings as Bear
- Tjiirdm McGuire as Richie
- Sebastian Tang as Kaden
- Charlotte Maggi as Angelique
- Jane Harber as Tanya
- Rohan Nichol as Griffo
- Kelton Pell as Vic Simmons
- Trisha Morton-Thomas as Barb Brewin
- Luke Carroll as Murray Peterson

== Episodes ==
No. overall	No. in season	Title	Directed by	Written by	Original release date
1	1	"Episode 1"	Ian Watson	Sam Meikle	1 April 2022
2	2	"Episode 2"	Ian Watson	Fin Edquist	2 April 2022
3	3	"Episode 3"	Isaac Elliott	Sam Meikle	3 April 2022
4	4	"Episode 4"	Ian Watson	Fin Edquist	4 April 2022
5	5	"Episode 5"	Isaac Elliott	Michelle Offen	5 April 2022
6	6	"Episode 6"	Geoff Bennett	Kelly Schilling	6 April 2022
7	7	"Episode 7"	Geoff Bennett	Sam Meikle	7 April 2022
8	8	"Episode 8"	Geoff Bennett	Sarinah Masukor	8 April 2022
9	9	"Episode 9"	Geoff Bennett	Michelle Offen	9 April 2022
10	10	"Episode 10"	Ian Watson	Fin Edquist	10 April 2022
