= Sandbox VR =

Virtual reality company

- Type: Private
- Industry: Location-based entertainment Virtual reality
- Founded: 2016
- Founder: Steve Zhao
- Headquarters: San Francisco, California, United States
- Number of locations: 80+ (2026)
- Products: Location-based VR experiences
- Website: sandboxvr.com

Sandbox VR is a location-based virtual reality entertainment company founded by Steve Zhao in 2016. Headquartered in San Francisco, California, with additional offices in Hong Kong and Vancouver, the company operates multiplayer VR experiences at physical venues.

== History ==
Sandbox VR was founded in 2016 by Steve Zhao in Hong Kong. The company initially operated under the name Glostation before rebranding to Sandbox VR. Zhao had previously founded and operated Blue Tea Games.

Sandbox VR's first location opened in Hong Kong in June 2017. In late 2017, the company secured $3 million in seed funding led by Alibaba Entrepreneurs Fund.

In January 2019, Sandbox VR announced a $68 million Series A funding round led by Andreessen Horowitz, with participation from Floodgate, Stanford University, TriplePoint Capital, CRCM, Shrug Capital, and Alibaba Group. This represented Andreessen Horowitz's first VR investment since backing Oculus VR approximately five years earlier.

In November 2021, Sandbox VR raised a $37 million Series B funding round led by Andreessen Horowitz's Growth Fund, along with Alibaba and Craft Ventures. The company reported that revenue had increased 20-fold following the reopening of locations in April 2021 compared to earlier in the year.

As of October 2021, Sandbox VR had 35 employees globally and operated 12 retail locations in the U.S., Canada, and Asia. By June 2024, Sandbox VR had opened its 48th location, with the company reporting over 100,000 players monthly.

Sandbox VR generated $75 million in sales in 2024 from over 1.4 million players. The company averaged 117,000 monthly players in 2024 and projected 150,000 monthly players for 2025.

In January 2026, the company announced plans to open approximately 200 franchise locations before the end of 2027. In March 2026, Sandbox VR announced it had surpassed $300 million in lifetime revenue.

== Technology and experience ==
Sandbox VR's experiences utilize full-body motion capture technology that tracks players' movements. Players wear VR headsets, haptic vests that provide physical feedback, motion sensors on their wrists and ankles, and PC backpacks. The technology captures full-body movements to render avatars in the virtual environment.

Experiences are designed for groups of 2-6 players and typically last approximately 30 minutes. Pricing starts at approximately $39 per person.

The company's venues feature multiple private rooms, called "holodecks," for virtual reality gameplay. Each holodeck is equipped with motion-tracking cameras and sensors. The system generates an automated highlight video that combines real-world footage of players with in-game footage, which can be shared on social media.

== Content and partnerships ==
=== Original content ===
All Sandbox VR experiences are developed by in-house studios located in Hong Kong and Vancouver.

Notable original titles include Deadwood Mansion, Deadwood Valley, Deadwood PHOBIA, Curse of Davy Jones, Amber Sky 2088, Age of Dinosaurs, Unbound Fighting League (UFL) and Seekers of the Shard: Dragonfire.

=== Netflix collaborations ===
In 2023, Sandbox VR entered into a partnership with Netflix to create VR experiences based on its properties, including Squid Game Virtuals, which is based on the Netflix original Korean series Squid Game. Since its release in 2023, Squid Game Virtuals has generated $50 million in lifetime sales. In 2025, the company partnered with Netflix again to develop the VR experiences Stranger Things: Catalyst and Rebel Moon: The Descent, based on Zack Snyder's Rebel Moon.
