= Jonny Sun =

Canadian author and illustrator

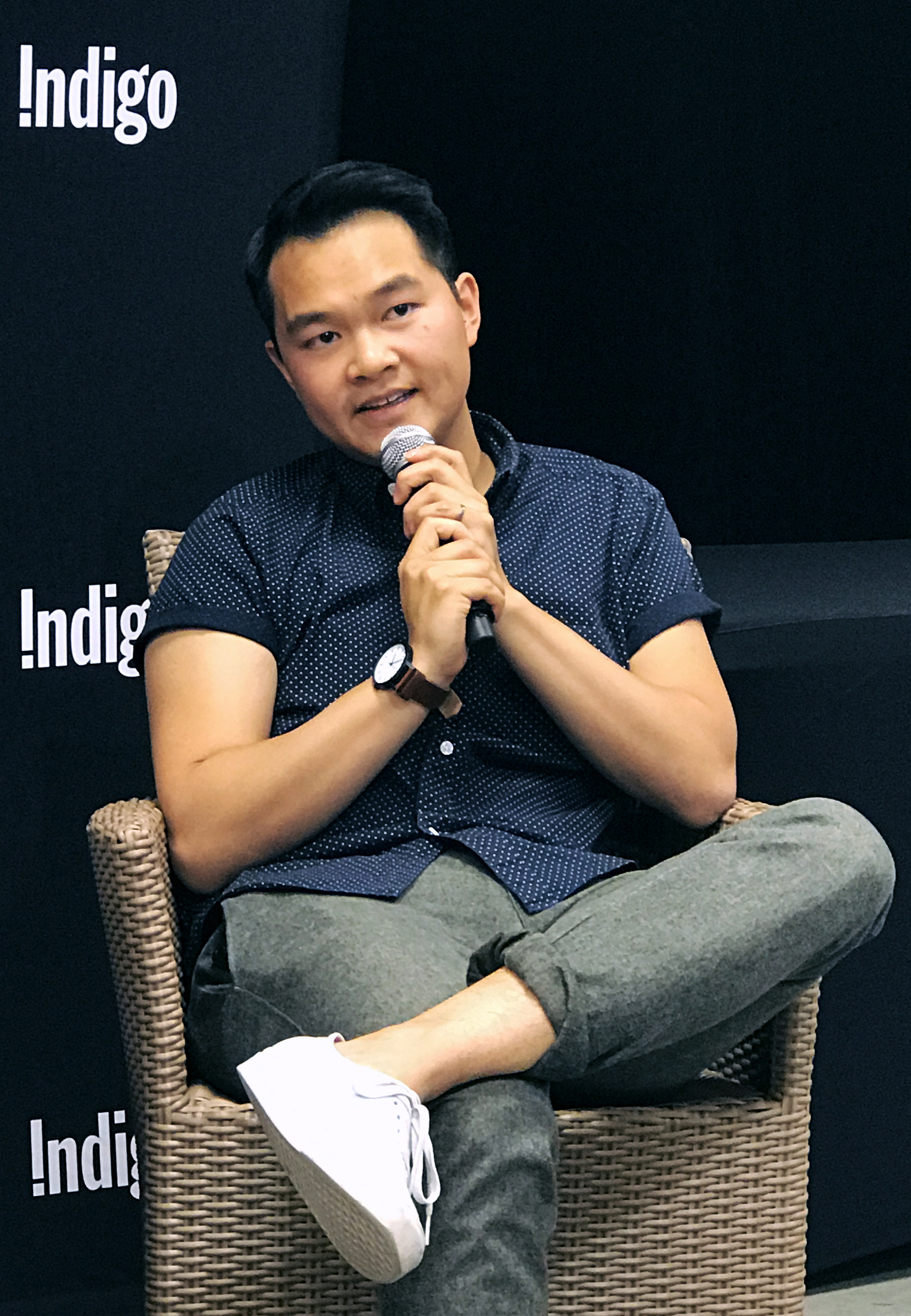
- Sun in 2017
- Education: University of Toronto; Yale School of Architecture; MIT
- Occupations: Humorist, author, illustrator
- Website: https://www.jonnysun.com/

Jonathan "Jonny" Sun, occasionally known by the nickname jomny, is a Canadian author and illustrator. He is the author of the 2017 illustrated novel everyone's a aliebn when ur a aliebn too and a PhD candidate in urban studies and planning at MIT. In 2018, he published Gmorning, Gnight!, (a collaboration with playwright and actor Lin-Manuel Miranda in which Sun served as illustrator) and in 2020, Sun published an essay collection called Goodbye, Again. Sun also served as a writer on the television shows BoJack Horseman and Mrs. Davis.

== Early life and education ==
Sun is from Calgary and attended the University of Toronto, getting his Bachelor of Applied Science degree in Engineering Science, majoring in Infrastructure Engineering. For his master's degree, he attended the Yale School of Architecture. He is now a PhD candidate in urban studies and planning at MIT and a creative researcher at the Harvard metaLAB. He studies social media, virtual place, and online community.

== Career ==
In June 2017, Sun published everyone's a aliebn when ur a aliebn too. The illustrated novel is based on a character Sun developed on Twitter, tweeting as an alien trying to learn to navigate life among humans. He has said the period in which he was beginning graduate school (and the toll that took on his mental health) was the impetus for the project, with the character offering an opportunity to work through the isolation and depression he experienced.

Sun's second book, a collaboration with musical playwright and actor Lin-Manuel Miranda, was released in October 2018. The book, Gmorning, Gnite! Little Pep Talks For Me & You, is a collection of affirmations drawn from Miranda's Twitter feed and illustrated by Sun. The book spent ten weeks on The New York Times Best Seller list.

In November 2018, he started working on an animated movie called Paper Lanterns. He was a writer for season 6 of BoJack Horseman and the limited series Mrs. Davis.

Sun's third book, Goodbye, Again: Essays, Reflections, and Illustrations, was released in April 2021. The book was written during a self-imposed break from all of his work and it became an instant New York Times bestseller, receiving praise from critics who remarked on Sun's "personal voice" and "little bits of ephemera."
