= Andy McQueen =

Canadian actor (born 1991)

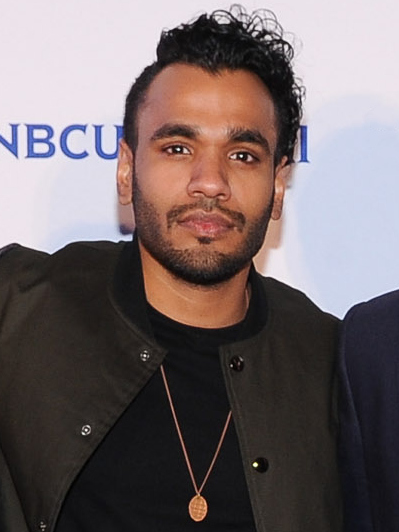
- McQueen in 2016
- Born: March 2, 1991 (age 35)
- Occupation: Actor
- Years active: 2010s–present
- Known for: Mrs. Davis, Station Eleven (miniseries)

Andy McQueen (born March 2, 1991) is a Canadian actor. He is most noted for his performance in the 2019 film Disappearance at Clifton Hill, for which he received a Canadian Screen Award nomination for Best Supporting Actor at the 8th Canadian Screen Awards in 2020, and his recurring role as Detective Malik Abed in the television series Coroner.

He also appeared in the films Brown Girl Begins (2017), Fahrenheit 451 (2018), Books of Blood (2020), Sugar Daddy (2020), Little Orphans (2020) and I Like Movies (2022), in the television series The Handmaid's Tale, Jack Ryan, The Girlfriend Experience, Station Eleven and Mrs. Davis, and on stage in the Toronto production of Jesus Hopped the 'A' Train.

Of Indo-Guyanese descent, he is an alumnus of the Actors Conservatory at the Canadian Film Centre.

== Filmography ==
=== Film ===
Year	Title	Role	Notes
2014	Pretend We're Kissing	Jay	
2014	Aaliyah: The Princess of R&B	Eric Ferrell	TV movie
2017	Brown Girl Begins	Jax	
2018	Fahrenheit 451	Gustavo	
2019	Disappearance at Clifton Hill	Singh	
2019	I Am in the World as Free and Slender as a Deer on a Plain		Short film
2020	Books of Blood	Steve	
2020	Sugar Daddy	Jeffrey	
2021	Defining Moments	Peter	
2022	I Like Movies	Brendan	
2023	Strangers in a Room	Geoff	
2024	Familiar Touch	Brian	
2025	Highest 2 Lowest	Larry Friday	

=== Television ===
Year	Title	Role	Notes
2013	Satisfaction	Terrance	
2013	Warehouse 13	Barista	
2013	The Listener	Uniformed Officer #1	
2015	Riftworld Chronicles	Kenji	Webseries
2015	V Morgan is Dead	Andrew	Webseries
2015	Saving Hope	Kevin	
2016	The Girlfriend Experience	Jake	
2016	Private Eyes	Lyle	
2016	People of Earth	Karl	
2018	The Handmaid's Tale	Dr. Epstein	
2018	Killjoys	Harold	
2018	Jack Ryan	Capt. Josh Whitmore	
2019-23	Coroner	Malik Abed	
2020	Nurses	Veer Sikka	
2021	Station Eleven	Sayid	Miniseries
2023	Outer Banks	Carlos Singh	Season 3
2023	Mrs. Davis	Jay	
2025	Revival	Ibrahim Ramin	
2026	Paradise	Ennis	
2026	Star Trek: Strange New Worlds	Roman	
2026	Anna Pigeon	Patrick Montgomery	
2026	Bite Size Terror	Ryan	
2026	Sheriff Country	Parker Chase	

=== Video games ===
Year	Title	Role	Notes
2015	Tom Clancy's Rainbow Six Siege	Harishva "Harry" Pandey	
