= Back-to-back film production =

Filming two movies at once

Back-to-back filming is the practice of shooting two or more films as one production, thus reducing costs and time.

Trilogies are common in the film industry, particularly in the science fiction, fantasy, action, horror, thriller, and adventure genres. Production companies may choose, if the first film is a financial success, to green-light a second and a third film at the same time and film them back-to-back. In a case where a lengthy novel is split into multiple installments for its film adaptation, those installments will usually be filmed back-to-back.

== Rationale ==
In modern filmmaking, employment is now project-based, transitory, and "based on a film not a firm." Almost all participants in the industry are freelancers, who move easily from one project to the next and do not have much loyalty to any particular studio, as long as they get paid.

This differs from the old studio system, a form of mass production in which a studio owned all the means of production (that is, reusable physical assets like sound stages, costumes, sets, and props) and carried large numbers of cast and crew on its payroll under long-term contracts. Under these contracts, actors and actresses were locked into working with a single studio and "were paid a specified weekly salary regardless of the success of their movies". In the early days of talkies, Hollywood studios made multiple-language versions of some films, effectively a parallel rather than a back-to-back production process in which sets and sometimes crew and supporting cast were shared by each version. Universal Pictures' 1931 English-language Dracula and Spanish-language Dracula are surviving examples.

Under the old studio system, "a producer had a commitment to make six to eight films per year with a fairly identifiable staff." Under the new system which replaced it after 1955, filmmaking became a "short-term film-by-film arrangement" in which a producer is expected to assemble an entirely new cast and crew for each project, and rent the means of production from contractors only as needed. The stars "turned the tables on the studios" and now auction "off their services to the highest bidder from film to film".

The advantage of the current system is that film studios no longer have to bother either with paying people who are not involved in a current film production, or with green-lighting films very frequently so as to efficiently exploit sunk costs in their human resources. Studios shifted from an emphasis on "speed in production" to "more cooperative pre-shooting planning." But now, when they want a particular person for a film, that person may be unavailable because they are already committed to another film for another production company for that particular time slot. In turn, for every single film, studios (and ultimately their investors, shareholders, or backers) end up bearing massive transaction costs because they not only have to get the right person at the right price, but at the right time, and if they cannot get that person, they have to scramble to locate a satisfactory substitute. All successful directors and producers have certain favorite cast and crew members whom they prefer to work with, but that is of no help to the studio if that perfect character actor, costume designer, or music composer is already fully booked. Compared to the previous system, directors and stars spend a much "larger part of their time negotiating each new film deal."

Therefore, if a film does well at the box office and appears to have established a winning formula with a particular cast, crew and storyline, one way to minimize these transaction costs on sequels is to reassemble as much of the team as soon as possible (before anyone dies, retires, or commits to other possible scheduling conflicts) and sign them to a single production that will be edited, released, and promoted as multiple films.

Filming back-to-back also minimizes the problem of actors visibly aging between sequels which do not have significant time gaps written in between them. James Cameron referred to this problem as the "Stranger Things effect"—where characters who are supposed to be in high school are played by actors who are a decade older—in order to explain why he filmed the second, third, and part of the fourth films of the Avatar series back to back.

The pioneer of modern back-to-back filmmaking was producer Alexander Salkind, who decided during the filming of The Three Musketeers (1973) to split the project in two; the second film was released as The Four Musketeers (1974). The cast was quite unhappy to be informed after the fact they had been working on two films, not one. As a result, the Screen Actors Guild introduced the "Salkind clause," which specifies that actors will be paid for each film they make. Salkind and his son Ilya went on to produce Superman and Superman II back to back.

== See also ==
- List of films produced back-to-back
- List of films split into multiple parts
