= Charlotte Maggi =

Australian actress

- Born: 2004 (age 21–22); West Leederville, Western Australia
- Education: Iona Presentation College
- Occupation: Actress
- Years active: 2022–present
- Television: MaveriX

Charlotte Maggi is an Australian television and film actress.

== Early life ==
Maggi is from the suburb of West Leederville in Perth, Western Australia where she attended Iona Presentation College.

== Career ==
Maggi made her television debut in the Australian young adult motocross series MaveriX (2022). That year she also appeared amongst the ensemble cast of the Australian television series Summer Love.

She was cast as Sam in the Zack Snyder film Rebel Moon (2023) and the follow-up, Rebel Moon – Part Two: The Scargiver. Her character Sam is described as a "kind and hard-working farm girl… who warmly welcomes any outsiders that come to her village." In 2023, she was cast in The Surfer alongside Nicolas Cage.

She is set to appear in I Let You In, a virtual reality 6-episode series based on the Talk to Me universe, which is set to debut on Meta Platforms in 2027.

== Filmography ==
Year	Title	Role	Notes
2022	MaveriX	Angelique	Lead role
2022	Summer Love	Frankie	
2023	Rebel Moon	Sam	
2024	Rebel Moon – Part Two: The Scargiver	Sam	
2024	The Surfer	Jenny	
2027	I Let You In	TBA	Post-production
