= Rebel Moon – Part Two: The Scargiver =

2024 film by Zack Snyder

- Release poster
- Directed by: Zack Snyder
- Screenplay by: Zack Snyder; Kurt Johnstad; Shay Hatten
- Story by: Zack Snyder
- Produced by: Deborah Snyder; Eric Newman; Zack Snyder; Wesley Coller
- Starring: Sofia Boutella; Djimon Hounsou; Ed Skrein; Michiel Huisman; Doona Bae; Ray Fisher; Anthony Hopkins
- Cinematography: Zack Snyder
- Edited by: Dody Dorn
- Music by: Tom Holkenborg
- Production companies: The Stone Quarry; Grand Electric
- Distributed by: Netflix
- Release dates: April 12, 2024 (United States); April 19, 2024 (Netflix)
- Running time: 122 minutes; 173 minutes (Chapter Two: Curse of Forgiveness)
- Country: United States
- Language: English
- Budget: $166 million (shared with Part One: A Child of Fire) (Note: Counting only below-the-line spending, to California workers and vendors.)

Rebel Moon – Part Two: The Scargiver (Note: Also known as Rebel Moon – Chapter Two: Curse of Forgiveness for its extended director's cut) is a 2024 American space opera film directed by Zack Snyder from a screenplay he co-wrote with Kurt Johnstad and Shay Hatten. A direct sequel to Rebel Moon – Part One: A Child of Fire (2023), the film takes place on the moon of Veldt where Kora and the crew of warriors ventures to help the farmers to defend and fight for their home against the Motherworld. Sofia Boutella, Djimon Hounsou, Ed Skrein, Michiel Huisman, Doona Bae, Ray Fisher, Staz Nair, Fra Fee, Elise Duffy, Charlotte Maggi, Stuart Martin, Cary Elwes, and Anthony Hopkins reprise their roles from the first film.

A week after it began a limited theatrical run in the U.S., Netflix released Rebel Moon – Part Two: The Scargiver on April 19, 2024. Like its predecessor, the film received generally negative reviews from critics. An R-rated director's cut, titled Rebel Moon – Chapter Two: Curse of Forgiveness, was released on August 2, 2024. Like the previous installment, the director's cut received mixed reviews, but it was generally considered to be an improvement over the original.

== Plot ==
Kora and her allies—Gunnar, Tarak, Nemesis, Titus and Milius—return to her and Gunnar's village on Veldt, believing that Atticus Noble, whom she had killed, is dead and that her group had prevented the Imperium's return to the village to claim its surplus grain supply, (Note: As depicted in Rebel Moon (2023)) but Aris, working as a double agent for the village and the Imperium, informs them that the Imperium is set to arrive in five days. The fighters join the villagers to harvest the grain supply in three days, intending to use the flour as leverage to deter the Imperium from bombing the village; over the remaining two days, Titus intends to train the villagers to fight.

Kora and Gunnar become lovers, and she admits that Balisarius compelled her involvement in his assassination of the Motherworld's royal family, with Kora shooting its princess Issa. Balisarius had then attempted to frame her for the coup, but she had instead fled to Veldt in an Imperium dropship to hide from the law.

Over two days, the group trains the handful of villagers in combat, preparing a plan involving digging trenches and tunnels in the fields, planting explosives, and preparing Kora's dropship. The group's members also reveal their pasts to each other, but Kora declines to share her involvement in the royal family's assassination. When Noble arrives with his dreadnought, his forces scan the village, identifying where the women and children, protected by Nemesis and Aris, are hiding, and send troops to capture them to force Kora out. Noble promises to spare the villagers if Kora surrenders, to which she complies, but Gunnar, unwilling to let Kora surrender, triggers the ambush and flees with her. Titus and Tarak lead the village in successfully repelling the first wave, though Nemesis is killed defending the women and children.

The large contingent of the heavily armored and mechanized second wave of Imperium troops pushes the few remaining defenders back, destroying much of the village, but Kora and Gunnar use her dropship and stolen Imperium uniforms to infiltrate Noble's dreadnought, with Kora laying explosives on its power source. Jimmy arrives to help the villagers and their allies in pushing back the assault, and the explosives detonate, bringing down the dreadnought. Gunnar is fatally wounded, and Noble overpowers Kora in a duel before being wounded by Gunnar and then killed by Kora. Kora and Gunnar flee the dreadnought, and Devra Bloodaxe and her rebel forces arrive in ships to destroy the remaining Imperium troops on Veldt as Gunnar dies.

In the aftermath, the village mourns the dead, and Kora admits her past, which Titus reveals he already knew. He also reveals that Issa is alive, and the group declares their intentions to find her and to fight against Balisarius, the Motherworld and the Imperium.

== Cast ==
- Sofia Boutella as Kora / Arthelais, a former Imperium soldier who rallies warriors from across the galaxy to fight against the Motherworld.
- Djimon Hounsou as Titus, a former general of the Imperium recruited to lead the fight against the Motherworld.
- Ed Skrein as Atticus Noble, an admiral and Balisarius' right-hand man. He was killed by Kora before being resurrected by the Imperium.
- Michiel Huisman as Gunnar, Kora's love interest and a farmer who joins her in her attempts to defend his homeworld Veldt.
- Doona Bae as Nemesis, a cyborg swordswoman.
- Ray Fisher as Darrian Bloodaxe, a deceased warrior and Devra's brother recruited by Kora. He appears in a flashback.
- Anthony Hopkins as the voice of JC-1435, "Jimmy", the last member of a race of mechanical knights.
- Staz Nair as Tarak, a nobleman-turned-blacksmith with the ability to bond with animals of nature.
- Fra Fee as Balisarius, a tyrant and Kora's adoptive father who seized control of the Motherworld.
- Cleopatra Coleman as Devra, Bloodaxe's sister and the leader of a band of insurgents opposing the Motherworld
- Stuart Martin as Den, a local farmer and hunter.
- Ingvar Sigurðsson as Hagen, a friend of Kora who helped her rebuild her life after she abandoned the Imperium
- Alfonso Herrera as Cassius, Noble's team warrior.
- Cary Elwes as the King.
- Rhian Rees as the Queen.
- Stella Grace Fitzgerald as Princess Issa.
- Elise Duffy as Milius, a rebel fighter recruited under Darrian's command.
- Sky Yang as Aris, a young Motherworld soldier who stands up against his comrades' brutality
- Charlotte Maggi as Sam, a farm girl who warmly welcomes any outsiders that come to her village.

== Production ==
=== Development ===
Rebel Moon is inspired by the works of Akira Kurosawa, the Star Wars films and Heavy Metal magazines. Johnstad and Snyder first started talking about creating the film in 1997. The project began development as a Star Wars film that Snyder had pitched to Lucasfilm, shortly after the sale of Lucasfilm to The Walt Disney Company in 2012. This pitch was to be a more mature take on the Star Wars universe.

Part Two received over $16.6 million in tax credits from the state of California for spending over $83 million on production in the state.

For the two-part Rebel Moon, the below-the-line wages to California workers and payments to in-state vendors were $166 million.

=== Post-production ===
The titles for the two parts were revealed to be Part One: A Child of Fire and Part Two: The Scargiver, according to teaser trailers released at Gamescom in August 2023. In March 2024, the official trailer was released.

== Music ==
Rebel Moon – Part Two: The Scargiver (Soundtrack from the Netflix Film)

Film score by Tom Holkenborg
- Released: April 12, 2024
- Studios: Abbey Road Studios, London
- Genre: Film score
- Length: 61:00
- Label: Netflix Music
- Producer: Tom Holkenborg

Tom Holkenborg chronology
| Godzilla x Kong: The New Empire (2024) | Rebel Moon – Part Two: The Scargiver (2024) | Furiosa: A Mad Max Saga (2024) |

Singles from Rebel Moon – Part Two: The Scargiver (Soundtrack from the Netflix Film)
- 1. "Songs of the Rebellion" Released: April 5, 2024

Rebel Moon – Part Two: The Scargiver (Soundtrack from the Netflix Film) is the soundtrack to the 2024 film Rebel Moon – Part Two: The Scargiver directed, written and produced by Zack Snyder. Snyder's regular collaborator Tom Holkenborg scored the film's music. The soundtrack was released by Netflix Music on April 12, 2024.

Holkenborg returns to compose the score for Part Two: The Scargiver, who served as composer for Part One: A Child of Fire. In March 2024, it was announced that a track list named "Songs of the Rebellion" would be released, based on the characters from the Rebel Moon universe. It features several artists, including Jessie Reyez, Tokischa, Tainy, Aespa, Tokimonsta, Black Coffee, and Kordhell. It was released on April 5, 2024.

=== Track listing ===
| No. | Title | Artist(s) | Length |
|---|---|---|---|
| 1. | "The Hated Other" | | 5:05 |
| 2. | "Seneschal Psalms" | | 2:02 |
| 3. | "We Make Ourselves a Place Apart" | | 2:13 |
| 4. | "Auguries of Innocence" | | 4:12 |
| 5. | "Quickhatch" | | 3:37 |
| 6. | "The Falling Mountain" | | 2:31 |
| 7. | "Enemy of the Sun" | | 1:30 |
| 8. | "Poems No Child Should Know" | | 3:09 |
| 9. | "Warmblood" | | 2:49 |
| 10. | "Born of Woman" | | 5:40 |
| 11. | "From a Rabble Such as This" | | 1:41 |
| 12. | "Everything That Rises" | | 3:50 |
| 13. | "Or Cover Me with Dirt" | | 2:25 |
| 14. | "What's Best In Men" | | 2:15 |
| 15. | "Cut and Run" | | 2:50 |
| 16. | "Who Dares Wins" | | 4:19 |
| 17. | "Whitsun Oath" | | 5:50 |
| 18. | "The Land We Breath" | Rose Betts | 2:01 |
| 19. | "Maman Tché" | Djimon Hounsou | 3:01 |
| Total length: | | | 61:00 |

== Release ==
Rebel Moon – Part Two: The Scargiver was released in select theaters in the United States for a week on April 12, 2024, and was released by Netflix on April 19, 2024.

A novelization based on the director's cut of the film written by V. Castro was published by Titan Books on June 4, 2024.

== Reception ==
=== Critical response ===
On the review aggregator website Rotten Tomatoes, 16% of 117 critics' reviews are positive, with an average rating of 3.8/10. The website's consensus reads: "Less a course correction than a compounding of everything that tangled up its predecessor, The Scargiver is an uninvolving space opera full of flat notes." Metacritic, which uses a weighted average, assigned the film a score of 35 out of 100, based on 28 critics, indicating "generally unfavorable" reviews.

For the director’s cut, 67% of 15 critics' reviews are positive, with an average rating of 6.9/10.

Simon Abrams of RogerEbert.com gave the film one out of four stars, saying that it "feels as anemic and negligible as the non-sexual scenes in a floppy, overproduced porno". Bob Strauss of the San Francisco Chronicle wrote that the majority of the film "is not that much better than the derivative, sludgy first installment", but felt that the battle sequences of the final 45 minutes were enough to raise his overall assessment to two-and-a-half out of four stars. David Ehrlich of IndieWire called the film a "catastrophic bore of a film".

=== Viewership ===
After premiering April 19 on Netflix, the film garnered 21.4 million views in three days, making it the most viewed English-language film on the service from April 15 to 21; it was the third consecutive Netflix number one for Snyder, starting with Army of the Dead and continuing Rebel Moon's first part. However, it would score 44.2 million viewership hours, marking a significant decline from the first part; part one was reported to have had 54.1 million viewership hours in its first three days. The film stayed in first place with 18.8M views in its first full week of availability, which still counted as its own second week in first place, following its debut weekend. The week after that, the film slipped to third place with 6M views, as the film also earned an overall worldwide total of 46.2M views. According to Netflix's “What We Watched: A Netflix Engagement Report", the film generated 55.8 million views from April 19 to June 30, 2024, 10 million views from July 1 to December 31, 2024, 5.8 million views from January 1 to June 30, 2025, 2.5 million views from July 1 to December 31, 2025, and 1.9 million views from January 1 to June 30, 2026, while the R-rated director's cut version of the film generated 8.3 million views from August 2 to December 31, 2024, 2 million views from January 1 to June 30, 2025, 1.5 million views from July 1 to December 31, 2025. and 2.4 million views from January 1 to June 30, 2026.

=== Accolades ===
| Award | Date of ceremony | Category | Recipient(s) | Result | Ref. |
|---|---|---|---|---|---|
| Golden Raspberry Awards | February 28, 2025 | Worst Remake, Rip-off or Sequel | Rebel Moon – Part Two: The Scargiver | Nominated | |
| Golden Reel Awards | February 23, 2025 | Outstanding Achievement in Sound Editing – Non-Theatrical Feature | Scott Hecker, Chuck Michael (supervising sound editors), Scott Hecker, Chuck Michael, Nick Interlandi, Bryan Jerden, Alexander Pugh, Andrew Vernon (sound effects designers), Greg ten Bosch, Brad Sokol (sound effects editor), Jessie Anne Spence (supervising dialogue/adr editor), Michael Hertlein, Arielle McGrail, Byron Wilson (dialogue/adr editors), Mark Pappas (supervising foley editor), Gary Hecker (supervising foley artist), Michael Broomberg, Mike Horton (foley artists) | Won | |

== Cancelled sequels ==
In April 2024, co-writer Kurt Johnstad announced that though original plans were for a trilogy of movies, the franchise will eventually consist of a total of six films; explaining that the stories for each original installment have been expanded into two parts. The writer stated that the treatments are completed for the third and fourth movie and Snyder is currently writing the third film. On the same day, Snyder stated that the total number of films in the series will either be four or six, depending on whether or not the second and third entries of the trilogy each get split into a two-part movie as well. However in May 2025, Johnstad stated that the sequels were no longer moving forward.

== See also ==
- List of films split into multiple parts
