= Rebel Moon =

2023 film by Zack Snyder

Rebel Moon – Part One: A Child of Fire
- Release poster
- Directed by: Zack Snyder
- Screenplay by: Zack Snyder; Kurt Johnstad; Shay Hatten
- Story by: Zack Snyder
- Produced by: Deborah Snyder; Eric Newman; Zack Snyder; Wesley Coller
- Starring: Sofia Boutella; Djimon Hounsou; Ed Skrein; Michiel Huisman; Bae Doona; Ray Fisher; Charlie Hunnam; Anthony Hopkins
- Cinematography: Zack Snyder
- Edited by: Dody Dorn
- Music by: Tom Holkenborg
- Production companies: The Stone Quarry; Grand Electric
- Distributed by: Netflix
- Release dates: December 15, 2023 (United States); December 22, 2023 (Netflix)
- Running time: 134 minutes; 204 minutes (Chapter One: Chalice of Blood)
- Country: United States
- Language: English
- Budget: $166 million (shared with Part Two: The Scargiver) (Note: Variety reported that $166 million is only the below-the-line cost to California workers and that the total cost would be much higher.)

Rebel Moon – Part One: A Child of Fire, or simply Rebel Moon, (Note: Also known as Rebel Moon – Chapter One: Chalice of Blood for its extended director's cut) is a 2023 American space opera film directed by Zack Snyder from a screenplay he co-wrote with Kurt Johnstad and Shay Hatten. Its ensemble cast features Sofia Boutella, Djimon Hounsou, Ed Skrein, Michiel Huisman, Bae Doona, Ray Fisher, Charlie Hunnam, and Anthony Hopkins. The film is set in a fictional galaxy ruled by the imperialistic Motherworld, whose military, the Imperium, threatens a village on the moon Veldt. Kora, a former Imperium soldier, ventures on a quest to recruit warriors from across the galaxy to make a stand against the Imperium before they return to Veldt.

Rebel Moon began a limited theatrical release on December 15, 2023, before it began streaming on Netflix on December 22. The film received negative reviews from critics, who praised the performances, action sequences, visuals, and music, but criticized its story and similarities to the Star Wars films. A sequel, Rebel Moon – Part Two: The Scargiver, released on April 19, 2024. An R-rated director's cut, titled Rebel Moon – Chapter One: Chalice of Blood, was released on August 2, 2024.

== Plot ==
In an unnamed galaxy, the imperialistic Motherworld sees its royal family, including Issa – a princess who was expected to end its militaristic Imperium's planetary conquests – assassinated. Balisarius, a senator and former general, subsequently declares himself regent and continues the Imperium's conquests.

Four years later, Atticus Noble, a sadistic Imperium admiral, arrives at a village on the moon Veldt on behalf of the Motherworld. He explains that his troops are hunting for a band of rebels led by siblings Devra and Darrian Bloodaxe, and offers to buy the village's surplus grain. The village's leader, Sindri, declines, claiming that the villagers barely have enough to survive. A farmer, Gunnar, ignoring earlier warnings from Sindri and Kora, another farmer, indicates that the villagers might have a higher amount. Noble kills Sindri and orders Gunnar to prepare grain for them in ten weeks, which would not leave the villagers with enough to survive. Noble departs, leaving several soldiers and a "Jimmy" robot to oversee the harvest. After facing harassment from a soldier, Jimmy befriends Sam, a villager. Kora prepares to leave, but finds most of the soldiers preparing to rape Sam and kills the soldiers with help from Aris, a soldier disgusted by his own comrades' actions; Jimmy intervenes and defects, saving Sam. Kora warns the villagers to mount a defense, knowing that Noble will kill them once he returns.

Kora and Gunnar depart for the port town of Providence, intending to recruit warriors for the village's defense, including Titus, a disgraced Imperium general. During their journey, she reveals to Gunnar that she once served the Imperium as a soldier, having been adopted and named Arthelais by Balisarius, an Imperium commander, after he eradicated her home planet's population, including her family. She was assigned as the bodyguard to Issa before her assassination.

Arriving at Providence, the pair meets smuggler and criminal Kai, who agrees to take them to Titus. He takes them to recruit Tarak, an ex-criminal who frees himself from slavery by taming a griffin-like bennu, and Nemesis, a partially-cybernetic swordswoman. The group arrives at a gladiator arena on a moon, finding Titus in a drunken stupor. Titus initially refuses to join, but agrees to do so after Kora suggests that he avenge his deceased soldiers. Using Gunnar's previous dealing with the Bloodaxes, the group then arrives at the planet Sharaan to meet them. Darrian agrees to defend the village and brings several rebels, including his lieutenant Milius, while Devra, unconvinced that a victory against Noble's dreadnought is possible, declines. After they depart, Noble arrives on Sharaan and eradicates its population as punishment for assisting the rebels.

Kai tells Kora that he has been moved by her quest to abandon his life as a smuggler and that he has one last shipment to drop off. He takes the group to an unregistered trade depot, at which Noble's personal craft has arrived, and restrains and betrays them to Noble, revealing he had always intended to do so for the bounties on their heads. Noble identifies Kora and Titus as deserters, Tarak as a former prince, and Nemesis as the assassin of sixteen Imperial officers and their security detail in revenge for her murdered children. Kai demands that Gunnar paralyze Kora; Gunnar instead frees her and kills Kai. In the ensuing battle, the other warriors are freed, and casualties include Darrian; Noble is apparently killed by Kora. Afterwards, Kora and Gunnar return with the surviving warriors to Veldt, with Jimmy watching them on their way to the village.

Noble is recovered by the Imperium, and he is revived after speaking on an astral plane with Balisarius, who demands that Noble end the insurgency and bring Kora to him alive so he can execute her himself.

== Cast ==
- Sofia Boutella as Kora / Arthelais, a former Imperium soldier who is on a mission to rally warriors from across the galaxy to fight against the Motherworld.
  - Elizabeth Martinez as child Kora.
- Djimon Hounsou as Titus, a former Imperium general recruited by Kora against the Motherworld.
- Ed Skrein as Atticus Noble, an admiral and Balisarius's right-hand man.
- Michiel Huisman as Gunnar, a farmer secretly in love with Kora who joins her in her mission to defend his village after selling it out in the initial contact with Noble.
- Bae Doona as Nemesis, a cyborg swordswoman
- Ray Fisher as Darrian Bloodaxe, Devra's brother, a warrior and commander of insurgents led by Devra who is recruited by Kora.
- Charlie Hunnam as Kai, a mercenary and starship pilot recruited by Kora.
- Anthony Hopkins as the voice of Jimmy, a member of a race of knight-esque robots. Dustin Ceithamer as the on-set body-double of Jimmy.
- Staz Nair as Tarak, a prince-turned-blacksmith who can bond with members of the griffin-esque bennu from their homeworld.
- Fra Fee as Balisarius, an Imperium commander and Kora's adoptive father who declared himself regent of the Motherworld.
- Cleopatra Coleman as Devra Bloodaxe, Darrian's sister and the leader of insurgents opposing the Motherworld.
- Stuart Martin as Den, a farmer and hunter on Veldt and Kora's fling.
- Ingvar Sigurdsson as Hagen, a villager on Veldt who became Kora's father figure after she left the Imperium.
- Alfonso Herrera as Cassius, Noble's team warrior
- Cary Elwes as the King
- Rhian Rees as the Queen
- Elise Duffy as Milius, a rebel fighter under Devra's command.
- Jena Malone as Harmada, a member of the arachnid-like humanoid ogumo.
- Sky Yang as Aris, a young Motherworld soldier who stands up against his comrades' brutality.
- Charlotte Maggi as Sam, a water girl who warmly welcomes any outsiders that come to her village
- Corey Stoll as Sindri, a village chief on Veldt.
- Stella Grace Fitzgerald as Princess Issa.
- Greg Kriek as Marcus, a Motherworld soldier who arrived on Veldt to demand their harvest.
- Brandon Auret as Faunus, a Motherworld commander, left in charge of the farming village on Veldt.
- Ray Porter as Hickman, a farmer whom Tarak is indebted to for crimes against the Motherworld.
- Dominic Burgess as Dash Thif, a connected man who came into conflict with Kora and Gunnar in Providence.
- Tony Amendola as King Levitica, an alien king who shelters the Bloodaxes and their rebellion.
- Derek Mears as Simeon, a Hawkshaw working for the Imperium, hunting their enemies for profit.

== Production ==
=== Development ===
Rebel Moon is inspired by the works of Akira Kurosawa, the Star Wars films, and Heavy Metal magazines; its logo is an homage to the latter. Snyder initially conceived the idea for the film in college, before discussing it with Johnstad in 1997. Johnstad mentioned that there were rough ideas discussed “We started working on character, scene structure, and action sequences maybe five years later. We started roughing things out.”

Snyder then pitched it as a Star Wars film to Lucasfilm, shortly after its sale to The Walt Disney Company in 2012. He also pitched his idea as both a video game and a film to Warner Bros. Pictures "a couple of times". The project was at one point planned as an original television series by Snyder and producer Eric Newman, before pitching it as a film to Netflix.

Following concerns from Netflix Films chairman Scott Stuber that the project would underperform due to its length, Snyder, unwilling to "lose all the character", decided to split the film into two parts.

=== Casting ===
Sofia Boutella's casting in the lead role was announced in November 2021. Charlie Hunnam, Djimon Hounsou, Ray Fisher, Jena Malone, Staz Nair, Bae Doona, Stuart Martin, and Rupert Friend joined the project in February 2022. Fisher first became aware of the project around 2019 or 2020 back when Snyder planned it to be a TV show, being shown whiteboards and showing his interest when Snyder explained that those were for a "little space thing" he was working on. Cary Elwes, Corey Stoll, Michiel Huisman and Alfonso Herrera joined the cast in April 2022. On May 16, 2022, it was announced that Ed Skrein had replaced Friend as the film's main antagonist due to scheduling conflicts, with Cleopatra Coleman, Fra Fee and Rhian Rees joining the project. On June 8, 2022, it was announced that Anthony Hopkins had joined the cast as the voice of Jimmy, a sentient JC1435 mechanized battle robot and one-time defender of the slain king.

=== Filming ===
Filming commenced on April 19, 2022, with Snyder sharing the first images from the set on Twitter that day. Snyder also served as cinematographer. It ran until December 2, with 152 days of filming taking place in California, to tap into $83 million in qualified spending and tax incentives. Stuart Martin, Cary Elwes, Rhian Rees and Ray Porter acted out and recorded the film's script for Snyder to listen to while preparing the day's shoot; they appear in the film as Den, The King, The Queen, and Hickman, respectively.

For the two-part Rebel Moon, the below-the-line wages to California workers and payments to in-state vendors was $166 million.

=== Post-production and visual effects ===
On August 20, 2023, the titles for the two parts were reported to be A Child of Fire and The Scargiver, respectively. Two days later, Zack Snyder appeared at gamescom opening night to present the teaser trailer for the two parts, which confirmed the titles.

Production VFX supervisor Marcus Taormina collaborated with Industrial Light & Magic (ILM), Framestore, Luma Pictures, Mammal Studios, Rodeo FX, Scanline VFX and Weta FX. Framestore delivered key creatures the Bennu and Harmada.

== Music ==
The score was composed by Tom Holkenborg, who has previously contributed to the score for the Snyder-directed Man of Steel (2013) and scored Batman v Superman: Dawn of Justice (2016) alongside Hans Zimmer, in addition to scoring Zack Snyder's Justice League and Army of the Dead (both 2021) as well the Snyder-produced 300: Rise of an Empire (2014).

== Release ==
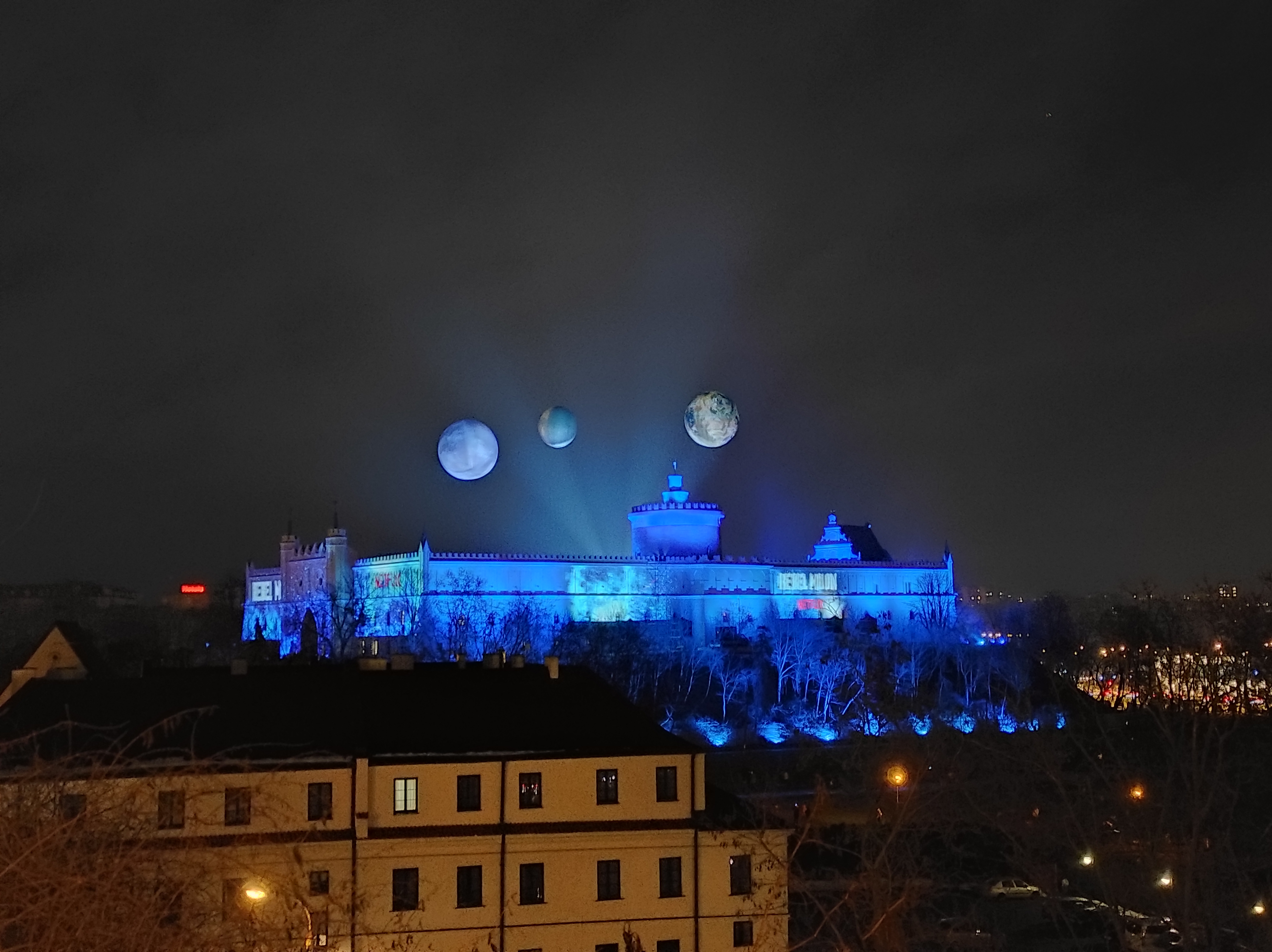
Planets floating above the Lublin Castle as a Rebel Moon advertisement

Rebel Moon had a limited theatrical release on 70 mm film in four major cities: Los Angeles (Egyptian Theatre), New York City (Paris Theater), Toronto (TIFF Lightbox), and London (Prince Charles Cinema) on December 15, 2023, before its streaming debut on December 22, by Netflix. Snyder announced plans to issue an R-rated director's cut in addition to the PG-13-rated cut.

== Reception ==
=== Critical response ===
On the review aggregator website Rotten Tomatoes, 22% of 182 critics' reviews are positive, with an average rating of 4.2/10. The website's consensus reads: "Rebel Moon: Part One – A Child of Fire proves Zack Snyder hasn't lost his visual flair, but eye candy isn't enough to offset a storyline made up of various sci-fi/fantasy tropes." Metacritic, which uses a weighted average, assigned the film a score of 31 out of 100, based on 40 critics, indicating "generally unfavorable" reviews.

For the director’s cut, 53% of 19 critics' reviews are positive, with an average rating of 6.0/10.

Variety writer Owen Gleiberman commented, "while eminently watchable, [Rebel Moon] is a movie built so entirely out of spare parts that it may, in the end, be for Snyder cultists only." Clarisse Loughrey of The Independent gave the film 1/5 stars, calling it "a film populated by some of the Zack Snyder's Justice League filmmaker's worst impulses: a mess of imagery, some of it attempting to shock, congregated largely around the idea of what might look good in a trailer." The Guardian's Charles Bramesco also gave the film 1/5 stars, writing, "the finished product has only the vaguest contours of ambition, diminished by a half-assedness dinkifying the latest CGI-jammed saga to decide the fate of the universe." RogerEbert.com's Simon Abrams gave the film 1 star out of 4 and characterized it as too similar to Star Wars and Seven Samurai, containing an over-reliance on visual spectacle with clichéd characters and themes.

Robbie Collin of The Daily Telegraph gave the film 2/5 stars, noting its similarities to Star Wars and saying that "this first half of Snyder's diptych... is more of a loosely doodled mood board than a functioning film – a series of pulpy tableaux that mostly sound fun in isolation, but become numbingly dull when run side by side." The Messenger's Jordan Hoffman gave it a score of 4/10, writing, "As a space opera, it has none of the weight of Dune, none of the characterizations of Guardians of the Galaxy, none of the madness of Jupiter Ascending or The Fifth Element and none of the pep of Star Wars." Writing for The A.V. Club, Lauren Coates said, "while Snyder may do his best to invent a dark, gripping universe to engross viewers, Rebel Moon is a limp, soulless regurgitation of tropes stolen from much more formidable films" and gave the film a D− grade.

Fred Topel of United Press International was more positive, calling the film "an entertaining filtering of science fiction and general storytelling tropes through the lens of creator/director Zack Snyder." The South China Morning Post's Daniel Eagan gave it 3.5/5 stars, writing, "What Snyder brings to the project is a sensational world-building vision and a muscular filmmaking style that can pummel viewers into submission." Adam Graham of The Detroit News gave it a B− grade, saying, "To its credit, it borrows from a solid slate of sources, and while it's highly derivative, it's also highly watchable. Its referential nature helps it clip along at an expedient pace, and while it never feels like you're watching something new, it at least feels like you're watching something familiar."

Reviewing the director's cut, Chase Hutchinson of Collider said it "lacks anything approaching depth or well-constructed action, failing to offer anything worth revisiting despite adding another nearly two hours". Conversely, Zosha Millman of Polygon considered Chalice of Blood an improvement over A Child of Fire, saying, "Ultimately Chalice of Blood ends with a stronger promise for future installments than Curse of Forgiveness delivers, but even with lengthy runtimes and ample side quests, it never feels like Snyder is biting off more than he can chew here."

=== Viewership ===
After premiering December 22 on Netflix, the film garnered 23.9 million views in three days, making it the #1 most viewed English-language film on the service from December 18 to 24, the second consecutive Netflix #1 for Snyder, starting with Army of the Dead; it was the ninth best 2023 debut for a Netflix original film. The film stayed in first place with 34M views in its first full week of availability, following its debut weekend. The week after that, the film slipped to second place with 11.1M views. In its fourth week, it had dropped to eighth place while earning 3.9M views, as the film also earned an overall worldwide total of 72.9M views. In 2024, for the week of April 15 to April 21, the film re-entered charts at number five, bringing in 5.5M views. The film jumped to fourth place on the top ten chart for the week of April 22 to April 28, adding 6M views. According to Netflix's “What We Watched: A Netflix Engagement Report", Rebel Moon generated 57.8 million views from December 21 to December 31, 2023, 54.2 million views from January 1 to June 30, 2024, 11.1 million views from July 1 to December 31, 2024, 6.9 million views from January 1 to June 30, 2025, 2.4 million views from July 1 to December 31, 2025, and 3.2 million views from January 1 to June 30, 2026, while the R-rated director's cut version of the film generated 7.6 million views from August 2 to December 31, 2024, 2.1 million views from January 1 to June 30, 2025, 1.5 million views from July 1 to December 31, 2025, and 2.4 million views from January 1 to June 30, 2026.

== Franchise ==
Zack Snyder has stated that his intent is for Rebel Moon to become "a massive IP and a universe that can be built out."

=== Sequels ===
Rebel Moon is planned to be a franchise that begins with a two-part film; each part to be shot back-to-back. By August of the same year, the follow-up was officially confirmed with the title Rebel Moon – Part Two: The Scargiver, and was released on April 19, 2024. Development of additional installments in the story were ongoing as of December 2023, with the script for the third film already being worked on. Snyder's exact series-length plans are unclear, having stated that the film is intended to be the first in a trilogy, but also that it would be followed by a "trilogy of sequels", implying four or five total.

In April 2024, co-writer Kurt Johnstad clarified that though the original plan was for a trilogy of movies, the franchise will eventually consist of a total of six films; explaining that the stories for each original installment have been expanded into two parts. The writer stated that the treatments are completed for the third and fourth movie and Snyder is currently writing the third film. On the same day, Snyder stated that the total number of films in the series will be either four or six, depending on whether or not the second and third entries of the trilogy each get split into a two-part movie as well.

However, in May 2025, Johnstad stated that the sequels were no longer moving forward. In July 2025, Snyder stated he would only return to the franchise after finishing his yet unnamed LAPD SWAT movie for Netflix, saying the process of filming two movies together was "very exhausting", and "we'll see after I finish this, when I come back, where we are with everything." In September 2026, Snyder expressed uncertainty over the third film moving forward and stated that the franchise would require more fan support for it to happen.

=== Novelization and spin-offs ===
A role-playing video game based on Rebel Moon was in development as of March 2023, alongside an animated short and a graphic novel. A novelization based on the director's cut of the film written by V. Castro was published by Titan Books on December 26, 2023. Snyder announced in July 2023 plans for a television series focusing on Balisarius. A videogame titled Blood Line: A Rebel Moon Game by Super Evil Megacorp launched in July 2025 as a Netflix exclusive, for mobile devices.

== See also ==
- List of films split into multiple parts
