= Drum & Lace =

Italian electronic trip-hop composer

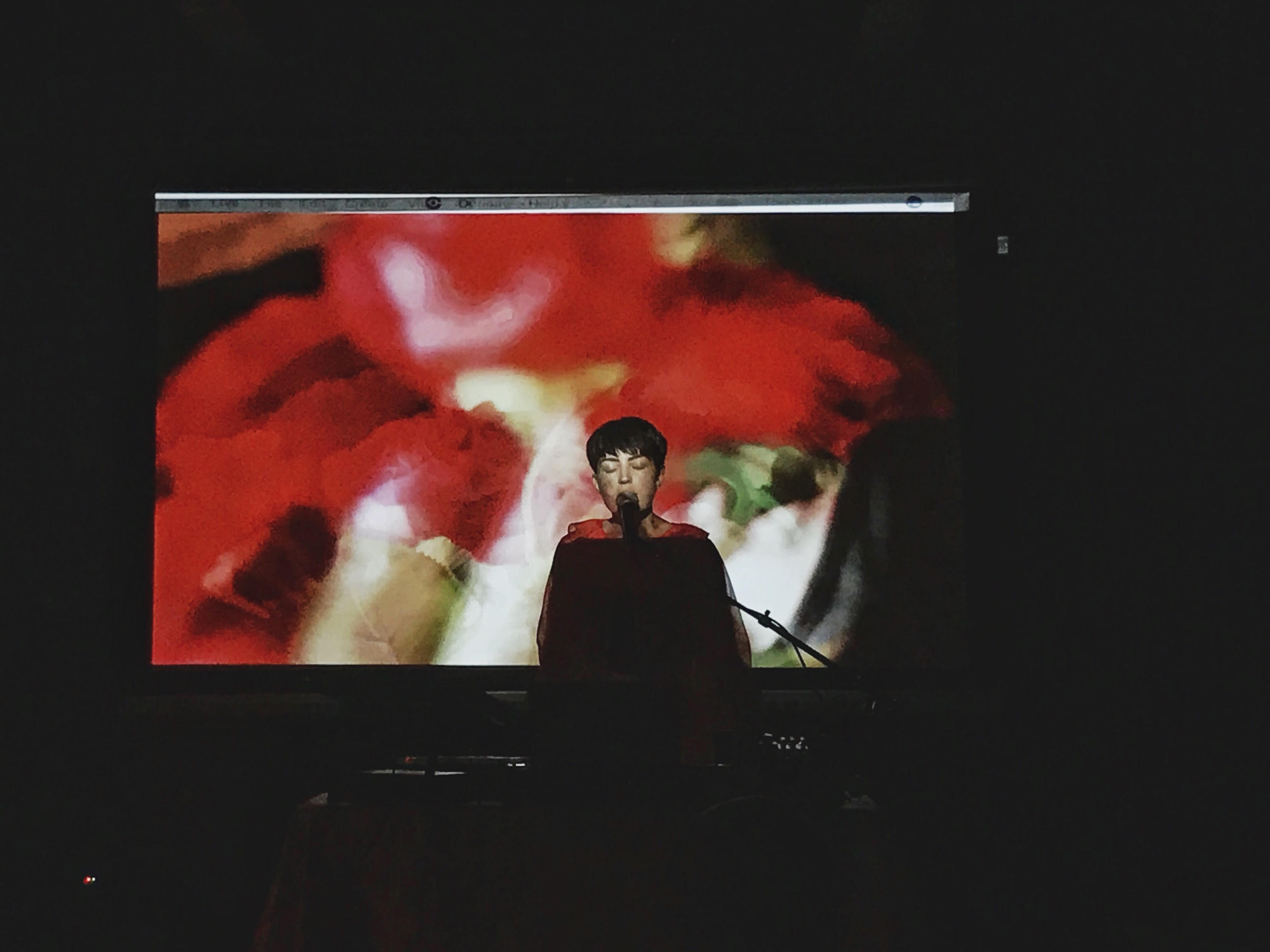
- Drum & Lace

Background information
- Also known as: Sofia Hultquist
- Origin: Florence, Italy
- Genres: Electronic, trip-hop
- Occupations: Musician, composer
- Years active: 2014 - present
- Labels: Records RK; EverybodyHz Records
- Website: www.drumandlacemusic.com

Sofia Hultquist (née Degli Alessandri; born February 7, 1986), better known by her stage name Drum & Lace, is an Italian electronic trip-hop composer. Hultquist is best known for co-composing the soundtrack to The First Monday in May with Ian Hultquist, and for composition and sound design in fashion, film, and media.

Hultquist is also known for co-scoring the fashion documentary The First Monday in May. She is also known to write music for soundscapes for fashion shows and presentations and is involved heavily in the fashion world.

== Early life ==
Hultquist was born and raised in Florence. As a child she began learning classical piano at the age of seven and developed a love of music and the arts. Several years later, she began taking voice lessons. In high school, she began learning drums and guitar.

She relocated to the United States to attend the Berklee College of Music in Boston, where she received her Undergraduate Degree in Film Scoring and Composition and New York University, where she received her Master's degree in Music Technology and Composition.

After college, she performed in a dream-pop duo called Aislyn until 2013.

== Personal life ==
Hultquist is married to fellow composer and musician Ian Hultquist.

== Influences ==
She cites her early influences as the albums Jagged Little Pill and Magic Kingdom, and musicians of the 1960s and 1970s including Led Zeppelin, Cream, The Who, and The Rolling Stones. She later discovered The Bends, OK Computer, and Homogenic which she says "changed everything".

== Career ==
In 2010 she and her husband Ian Hultquist created their side project 'Aislyn' where they remixed tracks for artists such as Neon Indian, Tokyo Police Club and more. Following that, in late 2013 she founded her one-woman musical project,Drum & Lace.

Hultquist also composes for film and television, with her most well known work being The First Monday in May.

=== Albums and singles ===
In 2016, Drum & Lace released two EPs, Dark Nights & Neon Lights and The Giving & the Taking. In 2017, they released the single Drive, an original EP Midnight Roses, and the remixed EP Sunrises.

Their albums have received positive reviews from media outlets, with Vehlinggo describing their compositions as "usually cinematic, often danceable, and always compelling."

=== Composition and sound design ===
In 2013, Hultquist formed Drum & Lace, combining her love for music and fashion, and pursued composition for fashion media.

Drum & Lace has composed original music and soundscapes to accompany runway shows, presentations, events, documentaries, short films, and campaigns, especially those that focus on ethical fashion, and advocates for sustainable fashion. They are known for their "ornate, beat-heavy, pop-infused, ambient electronic" aesthetic and have worked extensively with fashion clients on commissioned projects, including Diane von Fürstenberg, St. John, Lotuff Leather, Atelier Delphine, Palatines, Tanya Taylor, and À Moi for New York Fashion Week.

In 2016, Drum & Lace and Ian Hultquist co-composed the music for the documentary film The First Monday in May. The film opened the 2017 Tribeca Film Festival and follows the most attended fashion exhibit in the Metropolitan Museum of Art's history, China: Through the Looking Glass in 2015. The film was nominated for Best Documentary Feature Film and Audience Award at the Edinburgh International Film Festival. That same year, Drum & Lace also composed the music and contributed vocals to the soundtrack for the films Silicon Cowboys and My Blind Brother, which starred Jenny Slate, Adam Scott, Zoe Kazan, and Nick Kroll. Both films premiered at the SXSW Film Festival.

In 2017, Drum & Lace and Ian Hultquist co-composed the music for the feature film The Gospel According to André, which premiered at the 2017 Toronto International Film Festival.

Drum & Lace is a member of the Global Alliance for Women Film Composers.

== Discography ==
Year	Title	Label	Note(s)
2016	Dark Nights & Neon Lights	EverybodyHz Records	EP
2016	The Giving & the Taking	EverybodyHz Records	EP
2017	Drive	EverybodyHz Records	Single
2017	Midnight Roses	EverybodyHz Records	EP
2017	Sunrises (Remixes)	EverybodyHz Records	EP
2018	Snakeskin	EverybodyHz Records	Single
2018	Vesper b/w per:me:ate	EverybodyHz Records	Double-Single
2018	syncopate	EverybodyHz Records	Single

== Filmography ==
=== Film ===
Year	Title	Role	Note(s)
2014	Ivory Tower	Music assistant	as Sofia Hultquist
2014	Animals	Music assistant	as Sofia Hultquist
2015	The Diabolical	Music assistant, vocal	as Sofia Hultquist
2015	Thought Crimes: The Case of the Cannibal Cop	Music assistant	as Sofia Hultquist
2015	Burning Bodhi	Music assistant	as Sofia Hultquist
2015	Memoria	Music assistant	as Sofia Hultquist
2016	Love & Bananas	Composer, Executive producer	as Sofia Hultquist
2016	The First Monday in May	Co-composer	with Ian Hultquist; as Sofia Hultquist
2016	Smoke Gets in Your Eyes	Composer, Sound designer	Short film; as Sofia Hultquist
2016	Silicon Cowboys	Composer (additional music)	as Sofia Hultquist
2016	My Blind Brother	Music assistant, Musician (vocalist), Soundtrack ("Baby Elephants")	as Sofia Hultquist
2016	Night Skate	Composer, Composer (theme music), Co-producer	Short film; as Sofia Hultquist
2017	Clinical	Composer (additional music), Music assistant, Musician (vocalist)	as Sofia Hultquist
2017	The Gospel According to André	Co-composer, Score mixer	with Ian Hultquist; as Sofia Hultquist
2017	We Are Boats	Score mixer	as Sofia Hultquist
2017	Trapped	Composer	Short film; as Sofia Hultquist
2018	Invisible Hands	Composer	as Sofia Hultquist
2019	At the Heart of Gold: Inside the USA Gymnastics Scandal	Composer	with Ian Hultquist
2021	Deadly Illusions	Composer	
2021	Night Teeth	Composer	with Ian Hultquist
2022	Summering	Composer	
2022	They/Them	Composer	
2022	Look Both Ways	Composer	with Ian Hultquist
2022	Rosaline	Composer	with Ian Hultquist
2022	Radical Landscapes	Composer	with Ian Hultquist
2023	Cobweb	Composer	
2023	Red, White & Royal Blue	Composer	
2024	All of You	Composer	with Ian Hultquist; as Sofia degli Alessandri
2025	Prime Minister	Composer	as Sofia degli Alessandri

=== Television ===
Year	Title	Role	Note(s)
2016	Ethetics	Composer	Episode: "AKJP: Cape Town"; as Sofia Hultquist
2017	Breakthrough	Composer (additional music)	Episode: "Cyber Terror"; as Sofia Hultquist
2018	Lenny	Composer	Episode: "Pilot"; as Sofia Hultquist
2019–2021	Dickinson	Composer	with Ian Hultquist
2021	Pride	Composer	Episode: "1960s: Riots & Revolutions"; with Ian Hultquist
2020–2021	Good Girls	Composer	with Ian Hultquist
2021	I Know What You Did Last Summer	Composer	with Ian Hultquist

== Awards and nominations ==
In 2017, Drum & Lace was one of six women who were included on the Academy Award shortlist of composers for Best Original Score for The First Monday in May.
