= André Leon Talley =

American fashion journalist (1948–2022)

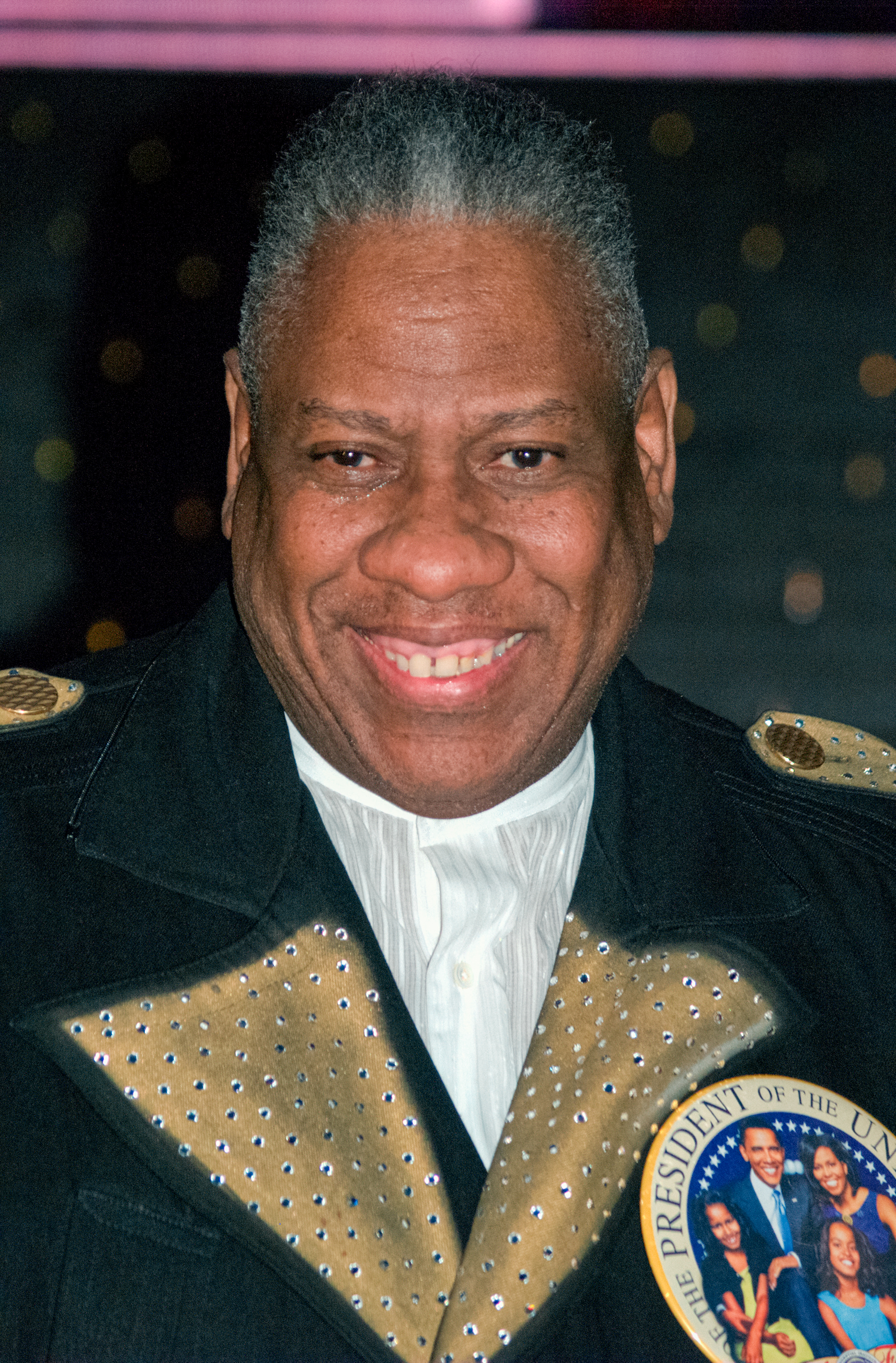
- Talley at the 2009 Tribeca Film Festival
- Born: October 16, 1948; Washington, D.C., U.S.
- Died: January 18, 2022 (aged 73); Greenburgh, New York, U.S.
- Education: North Carolina Central University (BA); Brown University (MA)
- Occupation: Fashion journalist
- Years active: 1974–2022
- Website: twitter.com/officialalt

André Leon Talley (October 16, 1948 – January 18, 2022) was an American fashion journalist, stylist, creative director, author, and editor-at-large of Vogue magazine. He was the magazine's fashion news director from 1983 to 1987, its first African-American male creative director from 1988 to 1995, and then its editor-at-large from 1998 to 2013. Often regarded as a fashion icon, he was known for supporting emerging designers and advocating for diversity in the fashion industry, while the capes, kaftans, and robes he wore became his trademark look. Talley also served on the judging panel for America's Next Top Model (from Cycle 14 to Cycle 17).

He authored three books, including Little Black Dress, A.L.T.: A Memoir and The Chiffon Trenches, which landed on The New York Times Best Seller list, and co-authored a book with Richard Bernstein. Talley was the editor-at-large of Numéro Russia in 2013, before resigning due to anti-LGBT laws in Russia. He additionally worked stints with Andy Warhol at Interview, Women's Wear Daily, W, Ebony and The New York Times. He once served as a stylist for United States President Barack Obama and First Lady Michelle Obama during their time in the White House; and styled First Lady Melania Trump for her 2005 wedding to President Donald Trump.

In 2020, France awarded him the Chevalier de l'ordre des Arts et des Lettres honor for arts and letters. The following year, he received the North Carolina Award for his role in literature. He was featured in the documentaries The First Monday in May and The September Issue, and was the subject of the documentary The Gospel According to André, directed by Kate Novack.

== Early life and education ==
Talley was born on October 16, 1948, in Washington, D.C., the son of Alma Ruth Davis and William Carroll "Caro" Talley, a taxi driver. At least one of his grandfathers was a sharecropper, and his maternal grandfather, John Davis, had fought in WWI in France. His parents left him to be raised by his maternal grandmother, Bennie Francis Davis, who worked as a cleaning lady at Duke University, in Durham, North Carolina. Talley credited her for giving him an "understanding of luxury" and stated, following her death, "I miss her almost every day."

He grew up in the Jim Crow era South, where segregation defined social boundaries. His early love of fashion was nurtured by his grandmother and further cultivated upon his discovery of Vogue magazine at a local library at the age of nine or ten.

Talley was educated at Hillside High School, graduating in 1966, and North Carolina Central University, where he graduated with a Bachelor of Arts in French literature in 1970. He won a scholarship to Brown University, where he earned a Master of Arts in French literature in 1972. At Brown, he wrote a thesis on the influence of Black women on Charles Baudelaire and initially planned to teach French.

== Career ==
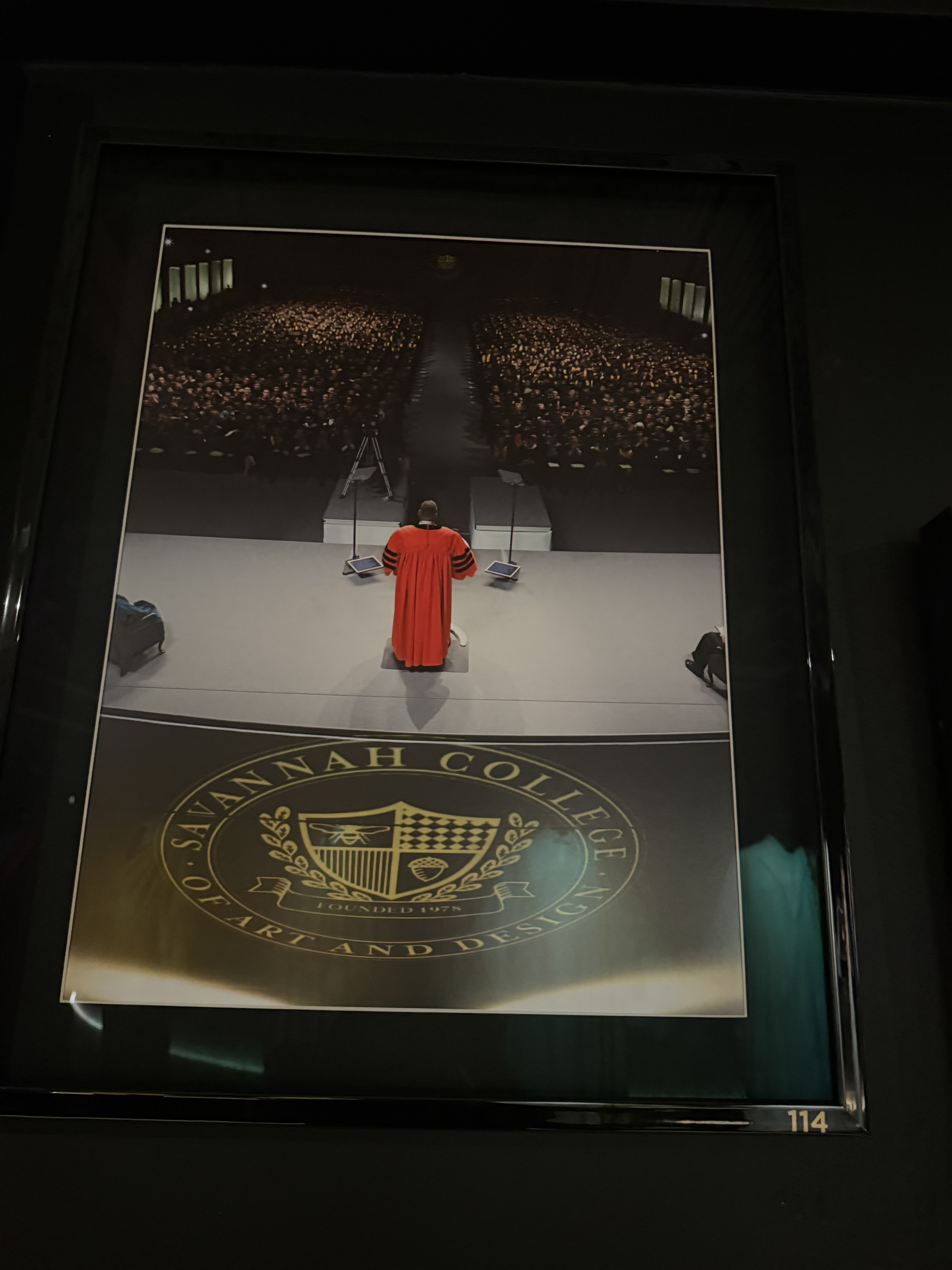
A picture of Talley speaking at SCAD Commencement taken at the SCAD FASH Museum of Fashion and Film.

Through the student connections he made in Providence, Rhode Island, he apprenticed, unpaid, for Diana Vreeland at the Metropolitan Museum of Art in 1974. Thoroughly impressed by his skills, the Vogue editor arranged for Talley to work at Andy Warhol's Factory and Interview magazine for $50 a week. He went on to write for Women's Wear Daily, becoming its Paris bureau chief, and W, from 1975 through 1980. He also worked for The New York Times, Ebony, and other publications before finally landing at Vogue, where he worked as the fashion news director from 1983 to 1987 and, later, as the magazine's first African-American male creative director from 1988 to 1995.

He pushed top designers to feature more Black models in their shows. In 1984, he co-wrote with Richard Bernstein the book MegaStar, with an introduction by Paloma Picasso, which includes portraits of celebrities. He left his role as creative director at Vogue, while continuing to serve as contributing editor, in order to move to Paris in 1995 to work for W. In 1998, he returned to Vogue as the editor-at-large, a position he held until his departure in 2013 to pursue another editorial venture.

In 2003, he authored an autobiography entitled A.L.T.: A Memoir, published by Villard in 2003. According to Publishers Weekly, the message delivered by the book is that "Style transcends race, class, and time." Two years later, he authored A.L.T. 365+, an art monograph designed by art director Sam Shahid, featuring photos and captions from one year of Talley's life.

In 2008, Talley advised the Obama family on fashion, while also styling Michelle Obama for her first Vogue cover, and introducing her to Taiwanese-Canadian designer Jason Wu, who went on to make several dresses for the First Lady, including her inaugural gown. Talley's later pairings were with designers Tracy Reese, Rachel Roy, and singer-actress Jennifer Hudson. He also styled Melania Trump for her 2005 wedding to Donald Trump.

From March 2010 to December 2011, Talley served on the judging panel for America's Next Top Model (from Cycle 14 to Cycle 17). From 2013 to 2014, he served as international editor of Numéro Russia, joining the team shortly after the magazine launched in March 2013 but resigned after 12 issues due to anti-LGBT laws in Russia. He was a member of the Board of Trustees of the Savannah College of Art and Design since 1995.

In January 2017, he live-blogged the Trump inauguration with New York Times columnist Maureen Dowd. In April of that year, Talley began hosting his own radio show centered on fashion and pop culture on SiriusXM satellite station Radio Andy.

Talley is the subject of a documentary film The Gospel According to André, directed by Kate Novack, which was screened in September 2016 at the Toronto Film Festival and was released in the U.S. on May 25, 2018. Reviewing the film, Variety said: "The documentary is a deeply loving, frequently beautiful testament to the former Vogue editor, who rose from humble beginnings in North Carolina to become arguably the high fashion world's first major African-American tastemaker, as well as the type of multi-lingual, Russian-lit-citing public intellectual who is perfectly at ease gossiping on TV with Wendy Williams." Talley was also featured in the documentaries The First Monday in May and The September Issue.

He released The Chiffon Trenches: A Memoir on May 19, 2020. In it, he chronicles his start in New York City in the 1970s, his tumultuous relationship with Wintour, and his experiences with racism in the fashion world. It became a New York Times Best Seller.

== Personal life ==
In 2007, Talley was ranked 45th in Out magazine's "50 Most Powerful Gay Men and Women in America". During his May 29, 2018, appearance on The Wendy Williams Show, when asked about his sexual orientation, Talley stated, "No, I'm not heterosexual; I'm saying I'm fluid in my sexuality, darling."

Talley was a practicing Christian, attending the Abyssinian Baptist Church in Harlem. In 2018, fashion critic Robin Givhan wrote that church attendance was among the chief elements that "influence the way he judges beauty and prioritizes grace."

In the mid-2000s, Anna Wintour initiated an intervention to encourage Talley to lose weight he had gained through periods of binge eating. In his memoir, Talley claims he chose binge eating as a means of coping with grief as well as unresolved childhood trauma. He eventually lost a great deal of weight and continued to prioritize exercise and well-being by frequenting the Duke Diet and Fitness Center in the late 2010s. In his final years, Talley would hold court and eat nearly all of his meals at the City Limits Diner near his home in White Plains, New York.

== Legacy ==
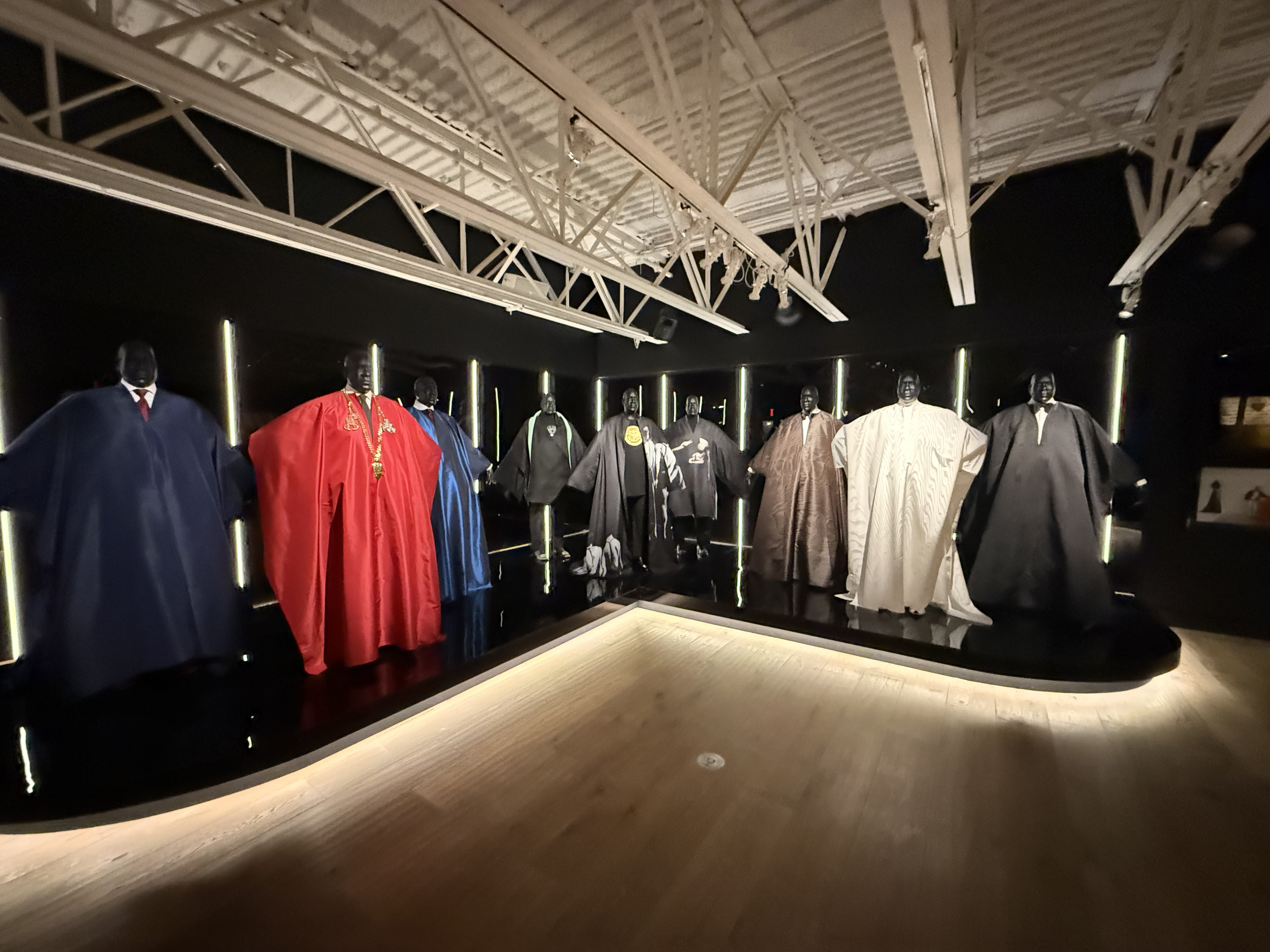
A collection of Talley's outfits at the SCAD FASH Museum of Fashion and Film in Atlanta, Georgia.

Talley's career as a fashion journalist spanned six decades, earning him respect and acclaim within the fashion industry. Thus, he has often been regarded by many as a fashion icon. His image has become synonymous with the capes, robes and kaftans he often wore, becoming his signature fashion items. Many of these long flowing vestments were custom-made for him by his famous designer friends including Tom Ford, Karl Lagerfeld, Ralph Rucci, Valentino, and Dapper Dan. Time referred to him as an "influential fashion journalist", while stating "At 6-feet-6 inches tall, Talley cut an imposing figure wherever he went, with his stature, his considerable influence on the fashion world, and his bold looks." In the 2006 film The Devil Wears Prada, the character Nigel Kipling portrayed by Stanley Tucci is widely regarded as a depiction of Talley.

Talley often advocated for diversity during his tenure at Vogue and within the fashion industry. "He also was very involved in fighting for more diversity on the runway, for more Black models", New York Fashion Week creator Fern Mallis said. "Mostly on the runway it started, and then certainly that became a movement about in every aspect of the industry".

He also helped advance the careers of nonwhite designers, including LaQuan Smith, whom he mentored, and styled American tennis player Serena Williams in his designs; while also introducing Michelle Obama to Taiwanese-Canadian designer Jason Wu, who crafted her dress for the 2009 inauguration. According to Tatler Asia, "Talley was responsible for including more Japanese designers in the pages of Vogue in the '90s, especially after witnessing the boom of debuts he saw in Paris", pushing for designers like Comme des Garçons and Issey Miyake to be featured in the magazine. Furthermore, he has mentored supermodel Naomi Campbell, and photographer Dario Calmese; often advising them and helping them further establish their careers.

He was also instrumental in reigniting the career of John Galliano, with The Cut stating, "In 1994, John Galliano was a man on the brink. The designer had lost his backer and was living in squalor in Paris. Galliano was lucky enough to have a support system that quickly mobilized — editors (notably Anna Wintour), models, accessory designers, and some generous benefactors worked together to make sure Galliano stayed on the fashion calendar. The show that resulted is still talked about as a watershed in his career. André Leon Talley was instrumental in helping to get the designer back on his feet — not only did he connect Galliano with a new backer and arrange to show at São Schlumberger's home, he recalls that he did everything from going on McDonald's runs for the staff and serving as an usher at the show". American designer Rick Owens, credits Talley with helping him launch his career in the fashion industry after being introduced by Talley to Anna Wintour.

== Death and tributes ==
Talley died from complications of a heart attack at a hospital in White Plains, New York, on January 18, 2022, at the age of 73.

Talley's death elicited an outpouring of sympathy and tribute from many friends, admirers, and organizations. Vogue editor-in-chief, Dame Anna Wintour, wrote that "The loss of André is felt by so many of us today: the designers he enthusiastically cheered on every season, and who loved him for it; the generations he inspired to work in the industry, seeing a figure who broke boundaries while never forgetting where he started from; those who knew fashion, and Vogue, simply because of him".

In a statement to Entertainment Tonight, his former America's Next Top Model colleague Tyra Banks stated: "I adored Andre. Before meeting him, I had never experienced such a prolific person serving up a rare mix of fashion 'fabulousness' and real down-home southern comfort love. Being in his presence was so magical. He made me smile, laugh and was a masterful teacher – a genius historian, scholar, colleague, effervescent spirit, legend…you are resting now, Dearest Andre. But your spirit, your je ne sais quoi, your iconic voice…I hear it now. And will forever. We all will."

Michelle Obama posted: "André Leon Talley was a one-of-a-kind presence who changed the face of fashion and beauty for a generation of girls just like me. He will be missed, but I know his legacy will continue inspiring people for years to come".

Friend and singer Mariah Carey posted on her Twitter: "Fashion’s elegant giant has fallen. Emancipated from the troubles of this world. Land softly and safely my friend into the loving arms of Almighty God. Rest in Power and Grace, Andre Leon Talley".

On her Twitter page, Bette Midler stated: "I'm sorry to say the extraordinary #AndreLeonTalley has died. He was such a force, & believed in the magic of Fashion & its illusions with all his being. His life was a saga of great highs, great lows, the dramatic, the ridiculous, and the endless pursuit of beauty. Love & RIP."

Towards the end of 2022, supermodel and friend Naomi Campbell authored a tribute to Talley in The Guardian titled "André Leon Talley, Remembered by Naomi Campbell", in which she detailed the personal effect he had on her life and the lives of those around him.

Other figures who paid tribute to Talley included Beyoncé, Viola Davis, Diane von Fürstenberg, Kris Jenner, Kim Kardashian, Oprah Winfrey, Edward Enninful, Zendaya and Rihanna.

Talley's memoir, The Chiffon Trenches, topped Amazon's fashion best-sellers chart and sold out at several book stores following the news of his death.

In 2023, during her Super Bowl Halftime Show performance, Rihanna paid tribute to Talley by wearing a full-length, red Alaïa puffer similar to the Norma Kamali Sleeping Bag coat he wore.

== Books ==
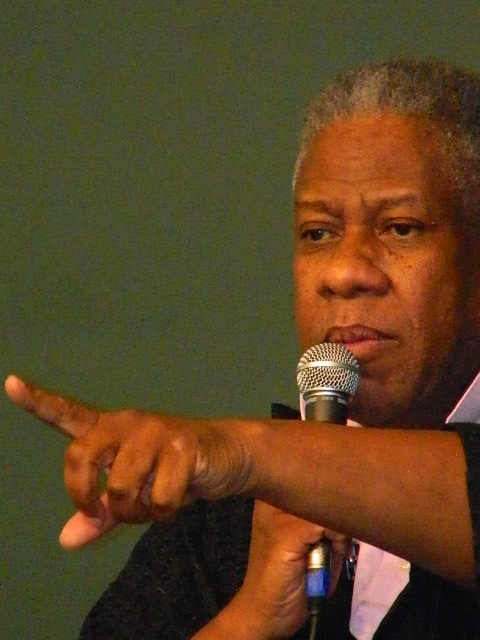
Talley fielding questions at New York book signing, June 10, 2013

- With Richard Bernstein, MegaStar, with an introduction by Paloma Picasso, Indigo Books, 1984, ISBN 978-0-394-62305-4
- A.L.T.: A Memoir, Villard, 2003, ISBN 0-375-50828-7
- A.L.T. 365+, designed by Sam Shahid, powerHouse Books, 2005, ISBN 1-57687-240-8
- The Chiffon Trenches: A Memoir, Ballantine, 2020, ISBN 9780593129258

== Filmography ==
Year	Title	Role	Notes	Reference
2006	"Say Somethin'"	Himself	Mariah Carey's music video (cameo)	
2007	The Hills	Himself	Season 2, Episode 11 - "Everybody Falls"	
2008	Sex and the City	Himself	Film role (cameo)	
2008	Valentino: The Last Emperor	Himself	Film role (cameo)	
2009	The September Issue	Himself	Documentary	
2015	Empire	Himself	Television role (episode: "The Devils Are Here") (cameo)	
2016	The First Monday in May	Himself	Documentary	
2017	Manolo: The Boy Who Made Shoes for Lizards	Himself	Documentary	
2018	The Gospel According to André	Himself	Documentary	
2019	The Capote Tapes	Himself	Documentary	
2022	Finding Your Roots	Himself	Season 8 Episode 10 "Where Did We Come From?"	

== Awards ==
- 2000: SCAD Lifetime Achievement Award (Renamed in 2001 the Andre Leon Talley Lifetime Achievement Award)
- 2003: Eugenia Sheppard Award for Fashion Journalism, Council of Fashion Designers of America
- 2008: Honorary Doctor of Humanities, Savannah College of Art and Design
- 2011: The André Leon Talley Gallery opened in the SCAD Museum of Art
- 2020: Chevalier de l'ordre des Arts et des Lettres honor for arts and letters
- 2021: North Carolina Award for literature

== See also ==
- LGBT culture in New York City
- List of LGBT people from New York City
- New Yorkers in journalism
- NYC Pride March
