= I Know What You Did Last Summer (TV series) =

2021 American slasher television series

- Promotional release poster
- Genre: Slasher; Horror; Thriller; Teen drama
- Created by: Sara Goodman
- Based on: I Know What You Did Last Summer by Lois Duncan
- Starring: Madison Iseman; Bill Heck; Brianne Tju; Ezekiel Goodman; Ashley Moore; Sebastian Amoruso; Fiona Rene; Cassie Beck; Brooke Bloom
- Music by: Drum & Lace; Ian Hultquist
- Country of origin: United States
- Original language: English
- No. of seasons: 1
- No. of episodes: 8

Production
- Executive producers: Sara Goodman; Neal H. Moritz; Pavun Shetty; Erik Feig; Peter Guber; James Wan; Michael Clear; Craig William Macneill; Shay Hatten
- Producer: Sheila Phillips
- Cinematography: Anka Malatynska; Shawn Mauer
- Editors: Ray Daniels; Trevor Baker; Jo Francis; Monica Daniel; Marc Pollon; Christopher M. Meagher
- Running time: 44–58 minutes
- Production companies: Off Center, Inc.; Original Film; Mandalay Television; Atomic Monster; Amazon Studios; Sony Pictures Television Studios

Original release
- Network: Amazon Prime Video
- Release: October 15 – November 12, 2021

Related
- I Know What You Did Last Summer franchise

I Know What You Did Last Summer is an American slasher television series based on the 1973 novel by Lois Duncan. It was adapted for Amazon Prime Video by Sara Goodman and is produced by Amazon Studios and Sony Pictures Television Studios, in association with Original Film, Mandalay Television and Atomic Monster. Part of the I Know What You Did Last Summer franchise, the series is a modern take on the original novel and follows a group of friends stalked by a brutal killer one year after covering up a car accident in which they killed someone. It features a cast led by Madison Iseman, Brianne Tju, Ezekiel Goodman, Ashley Moore, and Sebastian Amoruso, and also stars Bill Heck, Fiona Rene, Cassie Beck, and Brooke Bloom.

Amazon Studios announced the series's development in 2019, with Neal H. Moritz and James Wan serving as executive producers. It was given a straight-to-series order in October 2020. Filming took place in Oahu and began in January 2021. The first four episodes premiered to mixed reviews on Amazon Prime Video on October 15, 2021, with the remaining episodes debuting on a weekly basis. In January 2022, the series was canceled after one season.

== Cast and characters ==
=== Main ===
- Madison Iseman as
  - Allison, Lennon's "good, weird, boring" twin sister with whom she has a rivalry. She is part of what happened last summer.
  - Lennon, Allison's "partying, popular and sexual" twin sister.
- Bill Heck as Bruce, Allison and Lennon's father, who hides a secret from them. He owns Ohana Restaurant and Lodging and knows what happened last summer.
- Brianne Tju as Margot, the millionaire and best friend of Johnny and Lennon, although she is attracted to her. She is part of what happened last summer.
- Ezekiel Goodman as Dylan, Allison's love interest and Riley's best friend. He is part of what happened last summer.
- Ashley Moore as Riley, Lennon's friend and drug dealer and Dylan's best friend. She is part of what happened last summer.
- Sebastian Amoruso as Johnny, Margot's gay best friend who has a special connection with Allison. He is part of what happened last summer.
- Fiona Rene as Lyla, a police officer who carries out the investigation of the murders and is connected to Bruce.
- Cassie Beck as Courtney, Riley's mother, a somewhat violent woman who works at Ohana Restaurant and Lodging.
- Brooke Bloom as Clara, a mysterious woman who seems to have a connection with the twins' mother. She knows what happened last summer.

=== Recurring ===
- Sonya Balmores as Mei, Margot's mother who encourages her to be an influencer.
- Danielle Delaunay as Hannah, Dylan's hippie-ish mother.
- Chrissie Fit as Kelly, Eric's ex-wife.
- Victoria Schmidt as Ulani Kalama, a police officer who works with Lyla.

In addition, Spencer Sutherland co-stars as Dale, a young man from the village who saw Lennon's group the night of the event.

== Episodes ==
No.	Title	Directed by	Written by	Original release date
1	"It's Thursday"	Craig William Macneill	Teleplay by : Sara Goodman and Shay Hatten; Story by : Shay Hatten and Sara Goodman	October 15, 2021
Twins Allison and Lennon fight during an end-of-year high school party. Lennon sleeps with Dylan, Allison's high school crush. While Allison tries to take off in Lennon's car, all of Lennon's friends jump in the vehicle, including Dylan. They all mistake Allison for Lennon. On the ride home, they run over Lennon, who they believe is Allison. The group agrees to keep the secret and dumps the body in the ocean. Allison decides to assume the identity of her twin sister.
2	"It's Not Just for Dog Shit"	Craig William Macneill	Sara Goodman	October 15, 2021
The night after the party, it is revealed that Bruce knows that Allison took the identity of Lennon. She wanted to go the cops to say the truth, but Bruce dissuaded her, saying that he did not want to lose two daughters in one night. In the present, Bruce implores Allison to stay Lennon. Later, Johnny walks into a gym to find his boyfriend, who is struggling under a set of weights. Johnny goes to help him, and he falls off the balcony. As he is trying to crawl away, he is hit on the head by someone. Later, a video of Johnny being beheaded gets sent to all of his friends, and Allison runs across his head on the road.
3	"A Gorilla Head Will Not Do"	Logan Kibens	Johanna Stokes	October 15, 2021
Allison and her friends are devastated by Johnny's death. A young teenager, Dale is found dead and Allison receives a message from a mystery stalker, claiming to be Lennon, with a picture of scars to prove as much. There's even an accompanying video message of Dylan and Lennon having sex too.
4	"Hot Shrimp Salad"	Logan Kibens	Phoebe Fisher	October 15, 2021
During the night of the party, Lennon and Margot were lovers and having sex. Back in the present, Allison always posing as Lennon falls in love of Margot and they kiss before to be interrupted by Bruce. Later, the gang say their goodbyes to Lennon properly, burning the body and watching it float out to sea. Doug along with Harold are found dead.
5	"Mukbang"	Benjamin Semanoff	Gary Tieche	October 22, 2021
The group think to know who is after them and hunt for evidence. In flashbacks of the graduation party, it turns out that Lennon sought out Bruce, and they were driving back home. She threatened to reveal a secret that Allison is unaware of, claiming that it is ruining her life. Bruce insists that doing so will only hurt Allison. Lennon curses at her father and gets out of the car. An angry Bruce leaves Lennon stranded on the side of the road, where she gets hit by her own car with her sister behind the wheel. In the present, the group go to Clara's estate. Riley is then seen chased by the killer.
6	"Least You Had a Spare"	Benjamin Semanoff	Lana Cho	October 29, 2021
Twelve hours earlier in a flashback, the group is running away from Clara's estate, but it is a struggle. Riley gets on to the main road and messages the crew to explain she got out, but someone in a truck tries running her over. She gets hit by the truck, so she hides in the woods; Riley tries to ring her mother for help, but a blade impales her from behind. As she crawls away, reaching for her phone, her hand is severed. Later, the group find Courtney, Riley's mother dead. Meanwhile, Riley continues to struggle with her wounds. Clara eventually finds her, but she is dead. Margot thinks that Dylan is the killer but Allison is not convinced. Clara drags in Riley's body, and she tells him the tide is coming in.
7	"If Only Dogs Could Talk"	Logan Kibens	Chaconne Martin-Berkowicz	November 5, 2021
Allison meets her father, she wants help to find Dylan who disappeared. She also reveals that Riley is dead. Lyla finds the area where the rituals have been performed. She sees a dead Riley covered in honey, but the biggest surprise is that Clara is dead too. Margot is attacked by an unknown person but survives. Allison takes care of her.
8	"Your Next Life Could Be So Much Happier"	Logan Kibens	Sara Goodman	November 12, 2021

== Production ==
On July 26, 2019, it was announced that Amazon Studios would develop a television series based on the 1973 novel I Know What You Did Last Summer by Lois Duncan, with Neal H. Moritz and Pavun Shetty of Original Film serving as executive producers and Shay Hatten writing the pilot. On October 14, 2020, Amazon gave the project a series order, and it was announced that Sara Goodman had replaced Hatten as series writer. It was also announced that Goodman and Hatten would serve as executive producers on the series, alongside Erik Feig of Original Film and Rob Hackett, Michael Clear, and James Wan of Atomic Monster. On December 9, 2020, Craig William Macneill was announced as the director of the pilot as well as an executive producer. On January 11, 2021, Madison Iseman, Brianne Tju, Ezekiel Goodman, Ashley Moore, Sebastian Amoruso, Fiona Rene, Cassie Beck, Brooke Bloom, and Bill Heck were cast in starring roles. Later that month, Sonya Balmores was cast in a recurring role. In the following two months, Spencer Sutherland and Chrissie Fit also joined the cast in a recurring capacity. The series began filming on Oahu on January 25, 2021.

A soundtrack album for I Know What You Did Last Summer was released by Madison Gate Records on October 15, 2021, featuring original music by composers Drum & Lace and Ian Hultquist. The series premiered on Amazon Prime Video on the same date, with the first four episodes available immediately and the rest subsequently debuting on a weekly basis. On January 7, 2022, Amazon Prime Video canceled the series after one season.

== Reception ==
The review aggregator website Rotten Tomatoes reports a 41% approval rating with an average rating of 5.3 out of 10 based on 46 critic reviews. The website's critics consensus reads, "A bloodless slasher that fails to congeal, I Know What You Did Last Summer's killer cast can't make up for the show's many plot holes and unsatisfying twists." Metacritic, which uses a weighted average, assigned a score of 45 out of 100 based on 14 critics, indicating "mixed or average reviews".

Meagan Navarro, writing for Bloody Disgusting, gave the series three out of five stars. Navarro wrote, "Fantastic deaths and a gripping murder mystery pull you in, even when its mostly unlikeable leads tend to polarize", adding, "The more the series progresses, the murkier things get. It succeeds wholly in ensuring an unpredictable mystery that continues to surprise. When you think you've nailed a reveal, the series makes a shocking left turn", and concluded writing that "They may not engender themselves well to the viewer, but the slow trickle truth of who they are and their many secrets makes for a propulsive watch all the same."

Daniel Fienberg, writing for The Hollywood Reporter, said that, unlike the films, the then-teenagers are users of Instagram, and that "it is only somewhat about Instagram, on a purely practical level, but it takes the myopia exhibited in previous versions of the story to an extreme". He added that while a "new take absolutely has an angle all its own, and a justification for retelling this story", it is "mediocre", and concluded saying there is something "amusingly subversive" about the "kills" that define the genre.

Aedan Juvet of Screen Rant praised the adaptation and its use of "next-gen scream queen" Tju, writing that the actor brings "laughs, screams, and sheer perfection to her role as the series' all-important character".
