= The Gospel According to André =

- Poster
- Directed by: Kate Novack
- Produced by: Kate Novack; Andrew Rossi; Josh Braun
- Starring: André Leon Talley
- Cinematography: Bryan Sarkinen
- Edited by: Andrew Coffman; Thomas Rivera Montes
- Music by: Ian Hultquist; Sofia Hultquist
- Distributed by: Magnolia Pictures
- Release dates: September 2017 (Toronto); May 25, 2018
- Running time: 94 minutes
- Country: United States
- Language: English

The Gospel According to André is a 2017 American documentary about André Leon Talley. It was directed by Kate Novack.

== Participants ==
In addition to Talley, the following people appeared in the documentary:

- Anna Wintour
- Tamron Hall
- Tom Ford
- Marc Jacobs
- Diane von Fürstenberg
- Whoopi Goldberg
- Valentino
- Manolo Blahnik
- Maureen Dowd
- Fran Lebowitz
- Eboni Marshall Turman
- will.i.am

== Release ==
The film was released in theaters on May 25, 2018.

== Reception ==
The film has an 87% rating on Rotten Tomatoes based on 61 reviews. Leah Greenblatt of Entertainment Weekly graded the film a B+. Clayton Dillard of Slant Magazine awarded the film two stars out of four.

Andrew Lapin of NPR gave the film a positive review and wrote, "That's why, for everything Gospel leaves out, it's at least nice to see a film that does for (Talley) what he's been doing for designers and celebrities for years: Cheering him on."

Andrew Barker of Variety also gave the film a positive review and wrote, "At times hesitant to press Talley on some uncomfortable but important aspects of his life, the film amounts to essentially a long, intimate brunch conversation with its inimitable subject, and for those with even a passing interest in fashion, that should be plenty."

Frank Scheck of The Hollywood Reporter also gave the film a positive review and wrote, "The Gospel According to Andre should prove catnip for fashion buffs."
