= Assassination Nation (soundtrack) =

Assassination Nation (Original Motion Picture Soundtrack)

Film score by Ian Hultquist
- Released: September 21, 2018
- Genre: Film score
- Length: 65:48
- Label: Lakeshore
- Producer: Ian Hultquist

Ian Hultquist chronology
A.X.L. (2018)	Assassination Nation (2018)	At the Heart of Gold: Inside the USA Gymnastics Scandal (2019)

Assassination Nation (Original Motion Picture Soundtrack) is the film score to the 2018 film Assassination Nation directed by Sam Levinson. The film score is composed by Ian Hultquist which was released through Lakeshore Records on September 21, 2018.

== Development ==
Hultquist received the script of Assassination Nation during the fall of 2016 who admitted that the script was so relevant. He spent around a year working on the film score. Unlike the standard approach of composing, where music has been written to picture, Hultquist worked with Levinson and other members in the production department through numerous unique ways. As Hultquist had trained to write music to picture in his film scoring experience, the process of not writing music to picture was much difficult. However, Levinson encouraged him to try that process more and more which helped him in experimentation.

Hultquist stated that Levinson gave him "a completely blank slate" to work with and provided him complete freedom to experiment. At a certain point, the entire film was scored in a style of Ennio Morricone's Spaghetti Western work but as the film encompasses multiple genres, Hultquist wanted the score to follow the same. He admitted that the film featured numerous songs that carry forward the film, whereas his score brings back the audience by grounding it into reality; he liked the idea of how the song and score toy each other throughout the film, which felt fitting and how the internet toys with the characters in the story.

Hultquist experimented the score by slowed down and degraded audio, while composing trap beats set against strings, mangled synths, and a pop song falling apart into ambient mush. At certain instances, the editors would take a cue that Hultquist wrote, plop into Pro Tools and stretch it using the lowest-quality setting, which provide a "gritty, crushed, and unsettling" that sounded appropriate to the film, which Hultquist considered it a "free-fall into audio weirdness". Much of the final cues he had written were pieces of music that were slowed down to the original cue which was torn apart. He considered the score being fluid and often changes at regular intervals.

Hultquist and Levinson listened to so much music when the project began, with music supervisor Mary Ramos selecting the cues. Besides, Morricone's Western works, Hultquist singled out influence from Marco Beltrami's soundtrack for Scream and Cliff Martinez’s "dark synth stuff", as well as taking inspiration from pop songs by Air, Kanye West, Lana Del Rey, Migos and BTS. The song "Rage" was written and composed by Florence and the Machine keyboardist Isabella Summers, whom Hultquist also met when his old band Passion Pit toured with Summers' band. Levinson sent her track, which became a particular turning point of his composition crediting Summers' influence on the score.

== Release ==
The soundtrack was released through Lakeshore Records on September 21, 2018. A vinyl edition of the album was subsequently released on May 10, 2019.

== Reception ==
Leslie Felperin of The Hollywood Reporter noted that the film's music along with other aspects "continually impresses as a technical exercise". Amy Nicholson of Variety wrote "the score swells with tragic violins, and the film rampages on." Donald Clarke of The Irish Times called it "an excellent score by Ian Hultquist". Matt Donato of Flickering Myth wrote "Ian Hultquist's electro-punk-pop score beats to the pulse of societal anarchy."

== Track listing ==
No.	Title	Artist(s)	Length
1.	"Mayor Bartlett"		1:32
2.	"#FAIL"		0:23
3.	"The Life & Texts of Principal Turrell"		1:38
4.	"Internet Trolls"		2:28
5.	"I'm Not the Monster You Think I Am"		4:06
6.	"Half of Salem"		2:18
7.	"Slay 'em High Killa"		4:48
8.	"A Star is Born"		2:55
9.	"Assassination Nation"		0:51
10.	"Blow Us a Kiss"		1:52
11.	"Take Salem Back"		1:33
12.	"Marty's Confession"		3:03
13.	"Home Invasion"		8:35
14.	"On the Run"		0:49
15.	"Kiss Me"		3:34
16.	"Be Gentle"		2:32
17.	"Crimson"		1:51
18.	"The Shootout"		3:28
19.	"Surrender"		1:04
20.	"Rally Ur F**king Crew"		3:17
21.	"Trigger" (Bonus Track)		0:23
22.	"Rage"	Isabella Summers	5:18
23.	"Brat"	Abra	5:11
24.	"We Can't Stop"	Sonic Boom of the South	2:19
Total length:			65:48

== Personnel ==
Credits adapted from liner notes:

- Music composer and producer – Ian Hultquist
- Orchestra – Budapest Scoring Orchestra
- Orchestration – Dashiel Reed, Neal Desby
- Trumpet – Aaron Esposito
- Recording – Miklos Lukacs Jr., Gabor Buczko
- Mixing – Frank Wolf
- Executive producer – Brian McNelis, Skip Williamson
- Music consultant – Sofia Hultquist
- Music librarian – Anna Sapszon
- Music supervisor – Mary Ramos
- Session supervisor – Balint Sapszon
- Pro-tools operator – Miklos Lukacs Sr.
- A&R – Eric Craig, John Bergin
- Art direction – John Bergin
