= Mark Pedowitz =

American television executive

President of The CW
- In office April 28, 2011 – October 3, 2022
- Preceded by: Dawn Ostroff
- Succeeded by: Dennis Miller

Personal details
- Spouse: Carolyn Martin
- Education: Rockford College; John Marshall Law School
- Occupation: Producer; executive

Mark Pedowitz is an American entertainment executive. From 2011 to 2022, he was the president, and then chairman and CEO of The CW, after replacing the former president of entertainment Dawn Ostroff. During his time at The CW, Pedowitz oversaw all aspects including programming, sales, marketing, distribution, finance, research and publicity.

== Personal life ==
Pedowitz is of Jewish background. His alma maters are Rockford College and the John Marshall Law School. He is married to Carolyn Martin. The couple have no children.

== Career ==
Pedowitz began his career in the entertainment industry as an attorney at MCA Inc. in 1979. He was senior vice president of business affairs and administration, MGM/UA Television Production Group, a position he had held since 1987. From 1985–87, Pedowitz was vice president of business affairs and general counsel, The Landsburg Company. From 1980–85, he was vice president of business affairs, Reeves Entertainment. He served as executive vice president, ABC Entertainment Television Group, overseeing all business, legal and financial affairs for ABC Primetime and Touchstone Television, as well as business/legal affairs for ABC Daytime. He joined ABC in 1991 as senior vice president of business affairs and contracts.

Pedowitz in 2010 set up Pine Street Entertainment, a production company which had a first-look deal with Warner Bros. Television. In 2011 he was appointed as the president of The CW. He eventually became the longest-tenured head for a broadcast network and was promoted to the position of chairman and chief executive officer in January 2020.

During his tenure, Pedowitz focused on trying to broaden the audience for The CW, increased the diversity at the network, launched the Arrowverse and made the shows of the network available through The CW app. He also increased the amount of original programming, with the network airing shows on Sunday and Saturday, as well as during the summer. Producer Greg Berlanti credited him with giving many shows that were not successful initially a chance in contrast to other networks.

Pedowitz resigned on October 3, 2022 amidst the acquisition of the channel by Nexstar Media Group and was replaced by Dennis Miller as President. He revived Pine Street Entertainment following his departure. In 2023, Pedowitz and his production company signed with CAA for representation in all areas.
