= Fiona Rene =

American actress

- Born: April 5, 1988 (age 38)
- Education: Oklahoma Baptist University
- Occupation: Actress
- Years active: 2004–present

Fiona Rene (born April 5, 1988) is an American actress, director, and producer. She is best known for her roles in the CBS series Tracker (2024), Netflix's The Lincoln Lawyer (2022), and Amazon Prime's I Know What You Did Last Summer (2021).

== Early life ==
Rene was born in Montana, to a Chinese-American family.

She later attended community college in Austin, Texas, and graduated from Oklahoma Baptist University.

She decided she wanted to be an actress after participating in a school play in second grade.

== Career ==
In 2019, Rene played the role of Kara Lee in the ABC drama Stumptown. Her television credits also include appearances in Grey's Anatomy, L.A.'s Finest, and Jane the Virgin, where she portrayed Celeste, a mother in a same-sex relationship who joins Jane and her son on a playdate. Beyond screen acting, Rene has worked in theatre, animation, and voice-over, and has also directed interactive performances and contributed to creative consulting and production management.

Since 2010, she has acted in several short films and voiced characters in various video games. In 2020, she appeared in a supporting role as a flight attendant in the science fiction thriller Underwater, starring Kristen Stewart.

Rene's first leading television role came in 2021, when she portrayed Lyla, the town police chief, in the Amazon Prime series I Know What You Did Last Summer. In 2022, she appeared as Rebecca Lee, a lawyer and inmate, in Fire Country, and as Gloria Dayton in The Lincoln Lawyer. In 2024, she joined the CBS series Tracker, playing Reenie Greene, an attorney and the romantic interest of the main character Colter Shaw (Justin Hartley).

== Filmography ==
†	Denotes works that have not yet been released

=== Films ===
Year	Title	Role	Notes
2018	Randos	Whitney	Main role
2019	Tommy Gun	Jess	Supporting
2024	The Keepers of the 5 Kingdoms	Donna Lee	Supporting

=== Television ===
Year	Title	Role	Notes
2018	Jane the Virgin	Celeste	1 episode
2019	Grey's Anatomy	Janice	1 episode
2019-20	Stumptown	Kara Lee	Recurring role, 9 episodes
2021	I Know What You Did Last Summer	Lyla	Main role, 8 episodes
2022	The Rookie	Misha Porter	1 episode
2022	S.W.A.T.	Kim	1 episode
2022–2024	The Lincoln Lawyer	Gloria Dayton	Recurring role, 7 episodes
2022–2023	Fire Country	Rebecca Lee	5 episodes
2023	Captain Fall	Speed Dating Woman	1 episode
2023	With Love	Tori	1 episode
2024–present	Tracker	Reenie Greene	Main role, 37 episodes

=== Video Games ===
Year	Title	Role	Notes	Source
2011	Q.U.B.E.	Additional Voices		
2013	Cabela's African Adventures	Anna		
2017	The Invisible Hours	Sarah Bernhardt		
2022	We Are OFK	Jey Zhang / Xu Wang		
2022	The Twilight Zone VR	Security Guard		
2020	Yakuza: Like a Dragon	Seonhee	English dub	
2023	Diablo IV	Zolaya		
2024	Like a Dragon: Infinite Wealth	Seonhee	English dub	
2026	Yakuza Kiwami 3 & Dark Ties	Seonhee	English dub	
