= Sylvana Ward Durrett =

American film producer

Sylvana Ward Durrett (born 1981) is an American publisher and business executive.

== Early life ==
Durrett was born in Los Angeles, the daughter of actress Rosanna DeSoto and screenwriter David S. Ward.

She graduated from Princeton University in 2003 with a bachelor's degree in English literature.

== Career ==
She began her career at Vogue as an assistant to editor-in-chief Anna Wintour. She was director of special projects at Vogue. Durrett is considered one of the driving forces behind the annual Costume Institute Met Gala. She was responsible for organizing the Met Gala for eight years,

Durrett subsequently co-founded and is CEO of Maisonette, which sells children's clothing and household goods.

She produced and appeared in the film The First Monday in May about the work that goes into the Gala. She also worked on The Fashion Fund which focuses on the business aspect of fashion.
