= Lana Turner (stylist) =

American fashion stylist and collector

- Born: 1950 (age 75–76); Manhattan, New York, US
- Known for: Fashion style and collection

Lana Turner (born c. 1950) is an American fashion stylist and collector from Harlem. She is recognized for her collection of vintage clothing which includes over 500 hats. Turner has been featured in works by photographers, bloggers, and editors.

== Career ==
Turner worked in the real estate and art industries. Her daily work attire was "ornate" and always featured a toque. Her collection of vintage clothing includes over 500 hats. Turner's fashion attracts the attention of photographers, bloggers, and editors. She was a muse of street photographer Bill Cunningham. In 2015, artist Dario Calmese featured Turner and her collection in his special exhibition at the Projects+Gallery in St. Louis. In 2016, chef Marcus Samuelsson featured several of Turner's hats at his Red Rooster restaurant. Style blogger Ari Seth Cohen frequently features Turner.

== Personal life ==
Turner was born c. 1950 in Women's Hospital on 110th Street. She picked up fashion techniques from her parents who worked as a chauffeur and chambermaid. In the evenings, her parents would wear formal clothes to socialize in their Harlem community. Turner resides in Hamilton Heights and is a devout churchgoer.
