= Army of the Dead =

2021 film by Zack Snyder

- Release poster
- Directed by: Zack Snyder
- Screenplay by: Zack Snyder; Shay Hatten; Joby Harold
- Story by: Zack Snyder
- Produced by: Deborah Snyder; Wesley Coller; Zack Snyder
- Starring: Dave Bautista; Ella Purnell; Omari Hardwick; Ana de la Reguera; Theo Rossi; Matthias Schweighöfer; Nora Arnezeder; Hiroyuki Sanada; Tig Notaro; Raúl Castillo; Huma Qureshi; Garret Dillahunt
- Cinematography: Zack Snyder
- Edited by: Dody Dorn
- Music by: Tom Holkenborg
- Production company: The Stone Quarry
- Distributed by: Netflix
- Release date: May 14, 2021
- Running time: 148 minutes
- Country: United States
- Language: English
- Budget: $70–90 million
- Box office: $1 million

Army of the Dead is a 2021 American zombie heist film directed by Zack Snyder from a screenplay he co-wrote with Shay Hatten and Joby Harold, based on a story he also created. The film features an ensemble cast consisting of Dave Bautista, Ella Purnell, Omari Hardwick, Ana de la Reguera, Theo Rossi, Matthias Schweighöfer, Nora Arnezeder, Hiroyuki Sanada, Tig Notaro, Raúl Castillo, Huma Qureshi, and Garret Dillahunt. It follows a group of mercenaries who plan a Las Vegas casino heist during a zombie apocalypse.

Snyder conceived the idea for Army of the Dead as a spiritual successor to his 2004 debut film Dawn of the Dead. Originally from Warner Bros. Pictures, the project was announced in 2007 with Matthijs van Heijningen Jr. attached to direct. However, the film spent several years in development hell before Netflix acquired distribution rights in 2019. With a US$70–90 million production budget and Snyder also serving as cinematographer, principal photography took place in Albuquerque, New Mexico, and Atlantic City, New Jersey, in mid-2019. The film underwent reshoots in September 2020 after several sexual misconduct allegations were made against cast member Chris D'Elia; he was replaced by Notaro using green screens and CGI. It is Snyder's first film since Dawn of the Dead not to involve Warner Bros. Pictures, and his first film shot entirely with digital cameras.

Army of the Dead was released in select theaters in the United States for a week on May 14, 2021, and was digitally released on Netflix on May 21. Critics praised the film for its humor but criticized its plot and runtime. At the 94th Academy Awards, it won the "Oscars Fan Favorite" contest. It grossed $1 million at the box office. The film also spawned a spin-off prequel Army of Thieves.

== Plot ==
A U.S. military convoy traveling from Area 51 collides with a car on a highway. The convoy's cargo, a zombie, escapes, killing and infecting soldiers before heading into Las Vegas, infecting most of its population. After a military intervention fails, the government quarantines the city.

Six years later, casino owner Bly Tanaka and his associate Martin approach mercenary and former Las Vegas resident Scott Ward about a job to recover $200 million from his casino vault in Las Vegas before the military deploys a tactical nuclear strike on the city. Ward agrees and recruits his former teammates Maria Cruz and Vanderohe, along with helicopter pilot Marianne Peters, German safecracker Ludwig Dieter, and Chicano sharpshooter Mikey Guzman, who brings along his associate Chambers.

Martin joins the team to give them access to the casino. Ward's estranged daughter Kate, who works at a quarantine camp, directs them to Lilly, a smuggler familiar with the city, who also recruits Burt Cummings, a camp security guard. When Kate learns that Lilly has escorted her friend Geeta into Las Vegas, Kate insists on joining the team despite Ward's objections.

After an encounter with a zombified tiger upon entering Las Vegas, Lilly wounds Cummings and explains that a group of "Alphas" (intelligent zombies) will allow safe passage in exchange for a sacrifice. An Alpha known as the Queen takes Cummings away to the Olympus casino, where the Alpha leader Zeus infects him. Lilly leads the team to a building full of hibernating, normal zombies. Ward creates a path through them with glow sticks. When Chambers accuses Martin of ulterior motives, he diverts her off the path, and she wakes the zombies. After she is surrounded and bitten, Guzman shoots the gasoline canister on her back, killing her and the surrounding zombie horde.

At Bly's casino, Ward and Kate turn on the power, Peters prepares a helicopter on the roof, and Dieter works on the vault. A news report reveals that the government has brought forward the nuclear strike, giving the team approximately 90 minutes. Martin and Lilly stay outside under the pretense of keeping watch but instead lure the Queen into the open. Martin beheads her and takes her head. Zeus discovers her body and returns her to the Olympus casino, revealing that the Queen is pregnant with a zombie fetus. Enraged, Zeus directs the Alphas to the casino. As Dieter opens the vault, Ward discovers that Kate has left to look for Geeta. As Ward and Cruz are about to search for her, the Alphas appear and kill Cruz.

Martin traps the team in the basement, explaining that Bly cares only about the zombie head, which can create a zombie army for the government and is worth more than the money in the vault. When he steps outside, he discovers that Lilly stole the Queen's head, replacing it with a bill-counting machine, and the zombie tiger mauls him to death. Vanderohe attempts to fight Zeus but is overpowered. Dieter sacrifices himself to get Vanderohe into the vault safely. Ward, Lilly, and Guzman reach the lobby, where zombies attack them and swarm Guzman, who detonates his grenades, killing the zombies and himself, and destroying all the money he carried. Zeus confronts them on the roof. Lilly distracts him with the Queen's head as Ward and Peters escape. Zeus fatally impales Lilly, who destroys the Queen's head by dropping it off the roof.

Peters takes Ward to the Olympus casino to retrieve Kate. Inside, Kate finds Geeta and kills the infected Cummings. Zeus chases them onto Peters' helicopter, and Ward accidentally shoots Peters, causing the helicopter to fly haphazardly. Zeus overpowers Ward and bites him. As the nuke destroys Las Vegas, Zeus is distracted by the bomb flash, and Ward kills him. The nuke's shock wave causes the helicopter to crash, killing Peters and Geeta. Kate survives and finds Ward, who gives Kate money to start a new life before turning into a zombie. Kate kills him and starts crying as a rescue helicopter arrives. Having survived the blast, Vanderohe exits the vault with the remaining money and later rents a plane to take him to Mexico City. On the flight, he discovers that he has been bitten.

== Cast ==
- Dave Bautista as Scott Ward
- Ella Purnell as Kate Ward
- Omari Hardwick as Vanderohe
- Ana de la Reguera as Maria Cruz
- Theo Rossi as Burt Cummings
- Matthias Schweighöfer as Ludwig Dieter
- Nora Arnezeder as Lilly "Coyote"
- Hiroyuki Sanada as Bly Tanaka
- Tig Notaro as Marianne Peters
- Raúl Castillo as Mikey Guzman
- Huma Qureshi as Geeta Ranjan
- Garret Dillahunt as Martin
- Samantha Win as Chambers
- Colin Jones as Damon
- Richard Cetrone as Zeus
- Athena Perample as Alpha Queen

Additionally, Sean Spicer and Donna Brazile cameo in the film, credited as Male Pundit and Female Pundit respectively.

== Production ==
=== Development ===
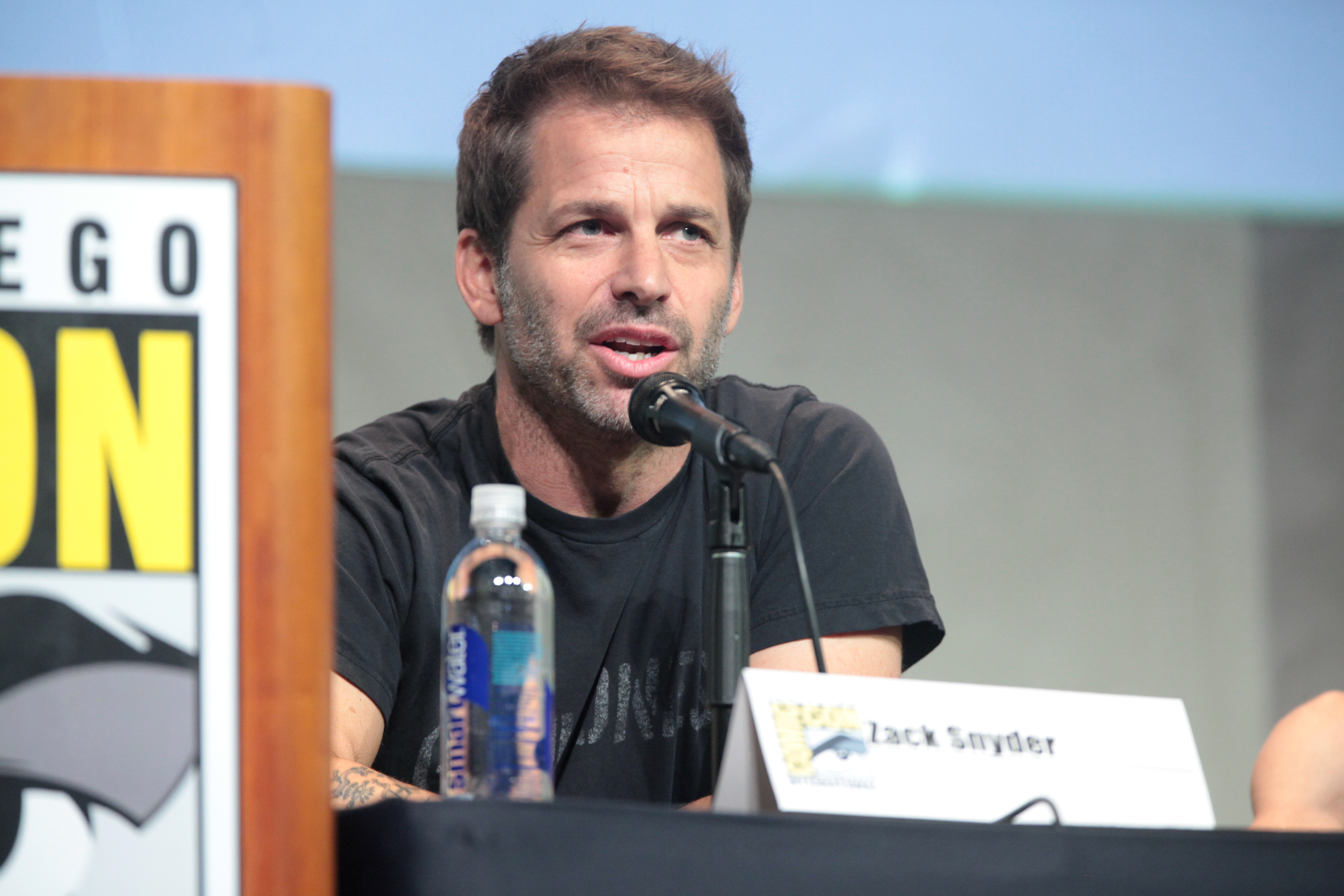
Army of the Dead co-writer, director, and cinematographer Zack Snyder

On March 25, 2007, Warner Bros. Pictures announced it would produce the zombie film Army of the Dead, based on a story by Zack Snyder and using a screenplay written by Joby Harold. In a statement, Snyder said he wanted the film to feel similar to his previous projects Dawn of the Dead (2004) and 300 (2007) and that it would center around a father in Las Vegas "who tries to save his daughter from imminent death in a zombie-infested world". At the time, Wesley Coller was attached to executive produce, with Snyder and his wife Deborah Snyder producing through Cruel & Unusual Films (now known as The Stone Quarry). The film is not a sequel to Dawn of the Dead but rather a spiritual successor. During Dawn of the Dead's production, Snyder got the idea and realized he needed a new origin story to develop the plot and a new incarnation of the living dead. He titled the project Army of the Dead as a tribute to the Night of the Living Dead series from George A. Romero. Snyder clarified his work on the project by saying it was "not made by committee. It's definitely a movie that's incredibly personal and singular".

In June 2008, Dutch commercial director and visual artist Matthijs van Heijningen Jr. was signed on to the project to make his feature directorial debut. By October 2011, however, the film was in development hell; van Heijningen said the film had been shelved "three months before shooting" due to the 2008 financial crisis. In an interview, van Heijningen also said the film, if moved forward, would include scenes where "the male zombies rape human females. And they have human hybrid zombie offsprings".

In February 2012, van Heijningen said Warner Bros. Pictures would cancel Army of the Dead "because of the expense of shooting in Las Vegas". After a failed attempt from Legendary Entertainment to produce it, Netflix acquired the distribution rights to the project in January 2019, now described as a zombie heist film, with Snyder attached to direct. In the initial report, given by The Hollywood Reporter, it was announced Netflix had given the film a $90 million production budget, with filming scheduled to begin that same year; Snyder added, "I thought this was a good palate cleanser to really dig in with both hands and make something fun and epic and crazy and bonkers in the best possible way. I love to honor canon and the works of art, but this is the opportunity to find a purely joyful way to express myself through a genre". As Harold's script was written with a different director and budget in mind, Snyder opted to rewrite the script in collaboration with Shay Hatten.

According to Snyder, Warner Bros. Pictures had been strict on their plans for the feature film and experienced budget issues as a result. Netflix allowed the director to create most of his ideas for the project. Snyder recalled a meeting where he spoke about several screenplays he was working on, and after mentioning Army of the Dead, Netflix head of original films Scott Stuber told him to "Go write that movie and let's make it. Go write it tomorrow, and we'll shoot it in a week".

=== Casting ===
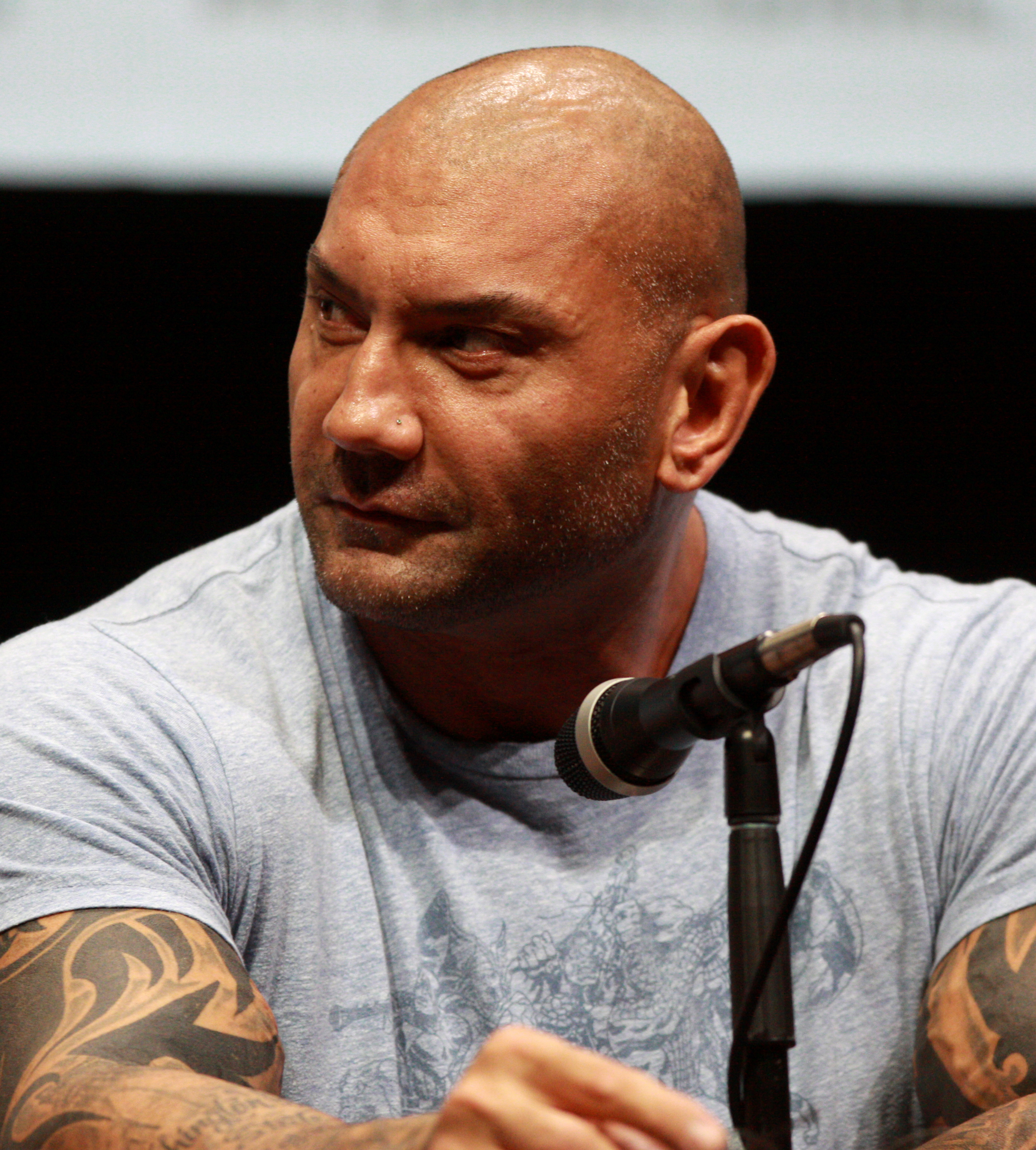
Dave Bautista chose Army of the Dead over The Suicide Squad to work with Snyder.

Dave Bautista was cast in April 2019, with the production budget now reported at $70 million. In joining the film, Bautista said his initial reaction to the offer was a clear "no," as the actor was searching for dramatic roles, but wanting to work with Snyder and having read the screenplay, he changed his mind and agreed to star. He also mentioned that he had to choose the project over The Suicide Squad, and told Digital Spy, "I had The Suicide Squad where I got to work with my boy [James Gunn] again, even though it's a smaller role, and then I had Army of the Dead on which I get to work with Zack, I get to build a relationship with Netflix, I get a lead role in a great film – and I get paid a lot more money. I had to call James, and I told him, 'It breaks my heart because as a friend, I want to be there with you, but professionally, this is the smart decision for me".

The following month, Ella Purnell, Ana de la Reguera, Theo Rossi, and Huma Qureshi were cast, and character descriptions were released. In July 2019, Omari Hardwick, Chris D'Elia, Hiroyuki Sanada, Garret Dillahunt, Raúl Castillo, Nora Arnezeder, Matthias Schweighöfer, Samantha Win, and Richard Cetrone were all announced as part of the cast. In an interview, Reguera was asked why she wanted to join the film and said it was because of its screenplay and that compared to other zombie features, Army of the Dead was "always about love". With the same question, Hardwick responded by saying he admired Snyder's unique cinematic style. Arnezeder replied by saying she enjoyed the screenplay for being a "zombie movie with a lot of poetry and a lot of different genres. It was funny at times; it had some thriller aspects to it. It's incorporating a lot of different genres that are melting really well together. It's really well put together". Schweighöfer responded to the question by saying he wanted to work with Snyder and also enjoyed the idea of playing a German with actual character and a sense of humor.

Before filming began, the cast was taken to "Zombie Boot Camp," where they trained their gun handling skills and practiced working as a group. Schweighöfer, who portrays a safecracker inexperienced with killing zombies, actually knew how to use a firearm and had to be trained to "look less skilled." Furthermore, Snyder has a brief cameo in the film, where he can be seen for a second on the reflection of a mirror holding a camera. Pointing it out, he said, "We were going to take it out but I told them to leave it, it's good".

=== Filming ===
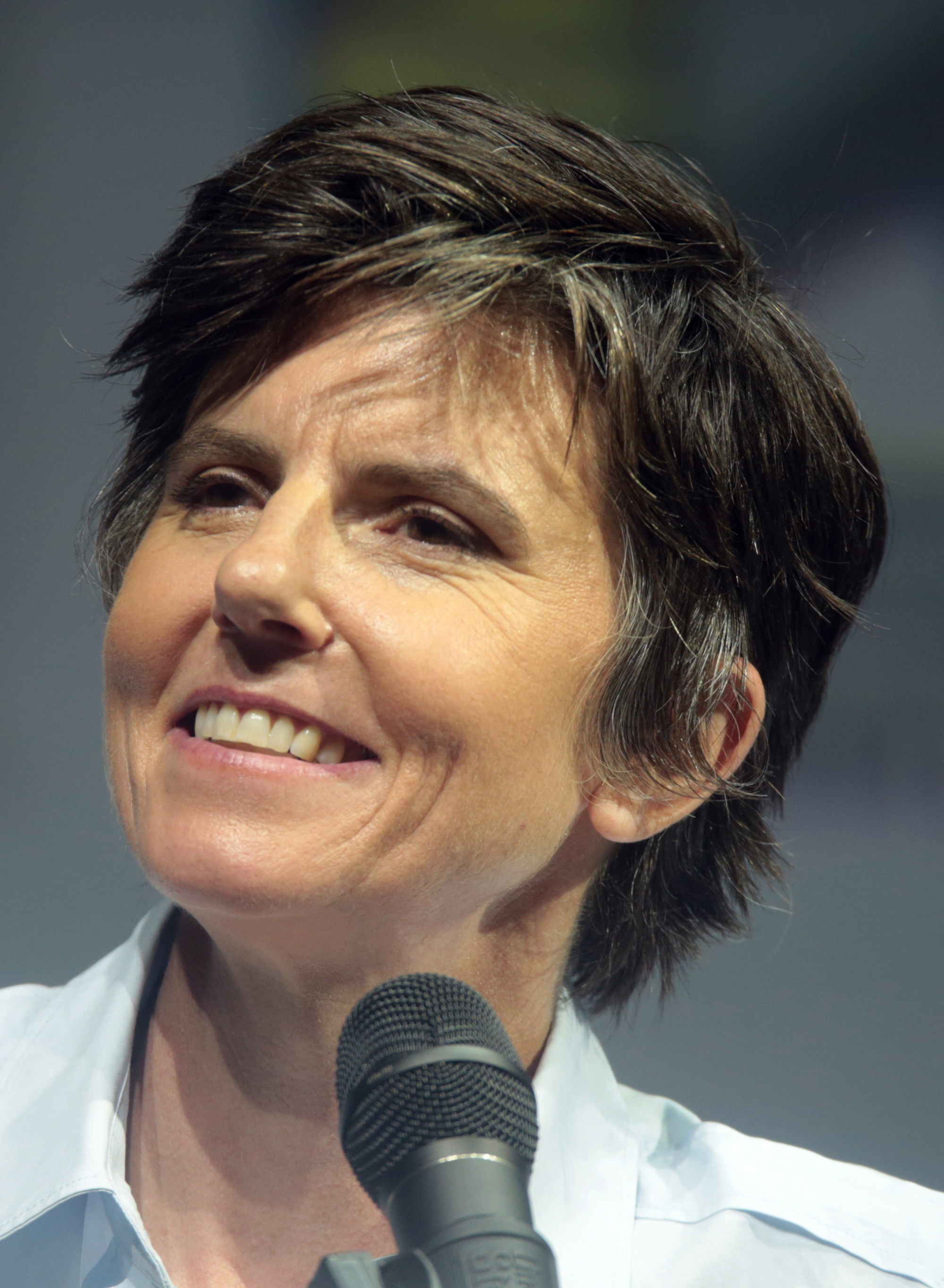
Tig Notaro was added into the film through CGI after replacing Chris D'Elia.

Principal photography for Army of the Dead began on July 15, 2019, in Albuquerque, New Mexico, and moved to Albuquerque Studios in August. Filming in Atlantic City, New Jersey, began in September, where the Atlantic Club Casino Hotel and the Showboat Atlantic City, both closed in 2014, were used for interior scenes and on-location filming. According to the New Jersey Motion Picture and Television Commission, $25 million from the film's budget were used for production in Atlantic City. Additional filming took place in Las Vegas, Nevada, and Los Angeles, California.

Snyder also served as the film's cinematographer and as his first feature using digital cameras, the company Red Digital Cinema designed custom-made "Red Monstro" cameras that could use the 1960s Canon 50mm f/0.95 rangefinder lenses Snyder had bought on eBay, giving the film what he described as "dreamlike, out-of-focus [imagery]" with "a soft, organic look". In a press release from Netflix, it was revealed the film's opening scene took five weeks to shoot, as Snyder wanted to capture it with natural light. Bautista also noted the filmmaker's direction and said that as the cameraman, Snyder would spend a lot of time shooting scenes from different angles, capturing hours of footage that included simply facial expressions, and would sometimes "go off on his own and start filming whatever he wants".

In August 2020, a year after filming had concluded, it was announced D'Elia would be cut from the film due to sexual misconduct allegations and that Tig Notaro would replace him. As a result of the COVID-19 pandemic, Notaro shot her scenes that September throughout 14 days with an acting partner using green screens; Reguera was the only cast member to return for the reshoots and shot two scenes with Notaro in half a day. After the reshoots, Notaro was added into the final product through CGI. On recasting the actor, Snyder said the decision was "fairly easy" but that it cost "a few million [dollars]". By March 2021, Snyder confirmed that work on the film had been completed.

=== Visual effects ===
The film's visual effects supervisor was Marcus Taormina. Wanting to capture aerial footage of the Las Vegas Strip, Taormina and his VFX crew were told by various casino owners that they were not allowed to enter their casinos and also could not access their roofs. As a result, Taormina and about a dozen VFX still photographers spent 12 days using scissor lifts, drones, and a Phase One camera attached to a helicopter to capture the footage and create a 3D model of the area, using LiDAR scanning, that was implemented during filming and post-production. To create Valentine, the zombie-tiger seen in the film, the VFX crew met with big-cat rights activist Carole Baskin (months before Netflix released Tiger King) and visited Big Cat Rescue in Tampa, Florida, to model their designs around one of the white tigers, named Sapphire, present in the sanctuary.

=== Music ===
Dutch composer Tom Holkenborg confirmed on a Reddit AMA in May 2020 that he would be composing the film's score. The soundtrack album was released by Milan Records on May 21, 2021. It includes Holkenborg's score and the Elvis Presley song "Viva Las Vegas" (performed by Richard Cheese and Allison Crowe). In an interview, Holkenborg recalled that Snyder told him to make the music "modern, make it unworldly, make it as emotional as you can with soft, dark, underlining haunting elements". To accomplish this, he created a "totally electronic score [...] packed with adrenaline-pumping music" that Snyder later said he enjoyed.

== Marketing ==
The marketing campaign from Netflix for Army of the Dead began on January 6, 2021, when "exclusive" images of the film were released and Snyder described it as a "full-blown, balls-to-the-wall zombie heist movie." In February, a promotional poster and images of the ensemble cast were released. As the film received an "R" rating from the Motion Picture Association, /Film expressed their reaction to the promotional content by writing that they were "very interested in seeing [Snyder] return to the world of zombies."

On February 25, 2021, Netflix unveiled its first teaser trailer for the film. From Deadline Hollywood, Patrick Hipes said it was "epic in scope" and compared the film's ensemble cast to that of Ocean's Eleven (2001). Meanwhile, Collider said that the teaser was brief and found it to be a bit vague but wrote that the film "looks like it's going to whip unholy amounts of ass. Snyder has become a lightning rod for hot takes in recent years, and whether or not you think that's deserved, it is nice to remember that he thrives in big, loud, glorious nonsense. Army of the Dead looks like the peak of big, loud, glorious nonsense, and I could not mean that as a compliment any harder."

That April, 15 more posters were released that were noted for their usage of a "vibrant, neon-lit" color scheme and for teasing a film "full of action and color." On April 13, 2021, an official 3-minute trailer was released featuring the Kenny Rogers-performed song "The Gambler". While Deadline Hollywood said the music choice was "eerie," Collider repeatedly said "Hell yeah" while commenting on several aspects of the trailer. Additionally, Ben Pearson from /Film said that the trailer showed that Snyder was "completely unleashed here, free to tell an absolutely insane-looking heist story," compared it to Hell or High Water (2016), and wrote that it "looks like a total blast."

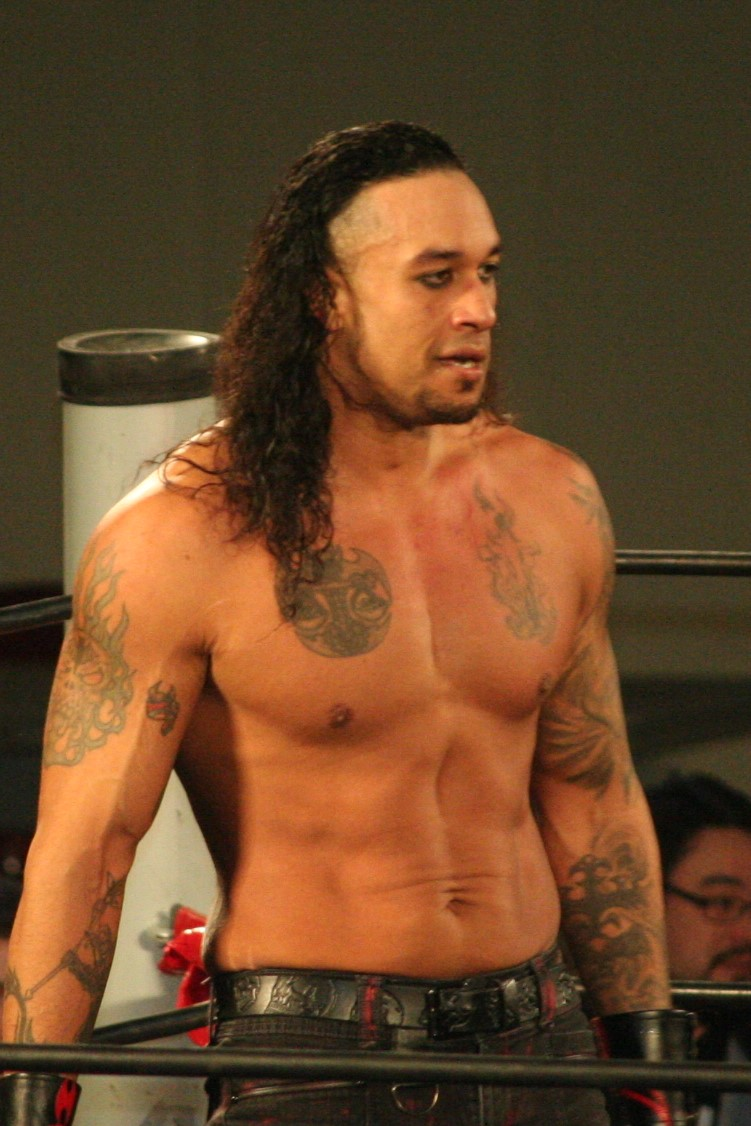
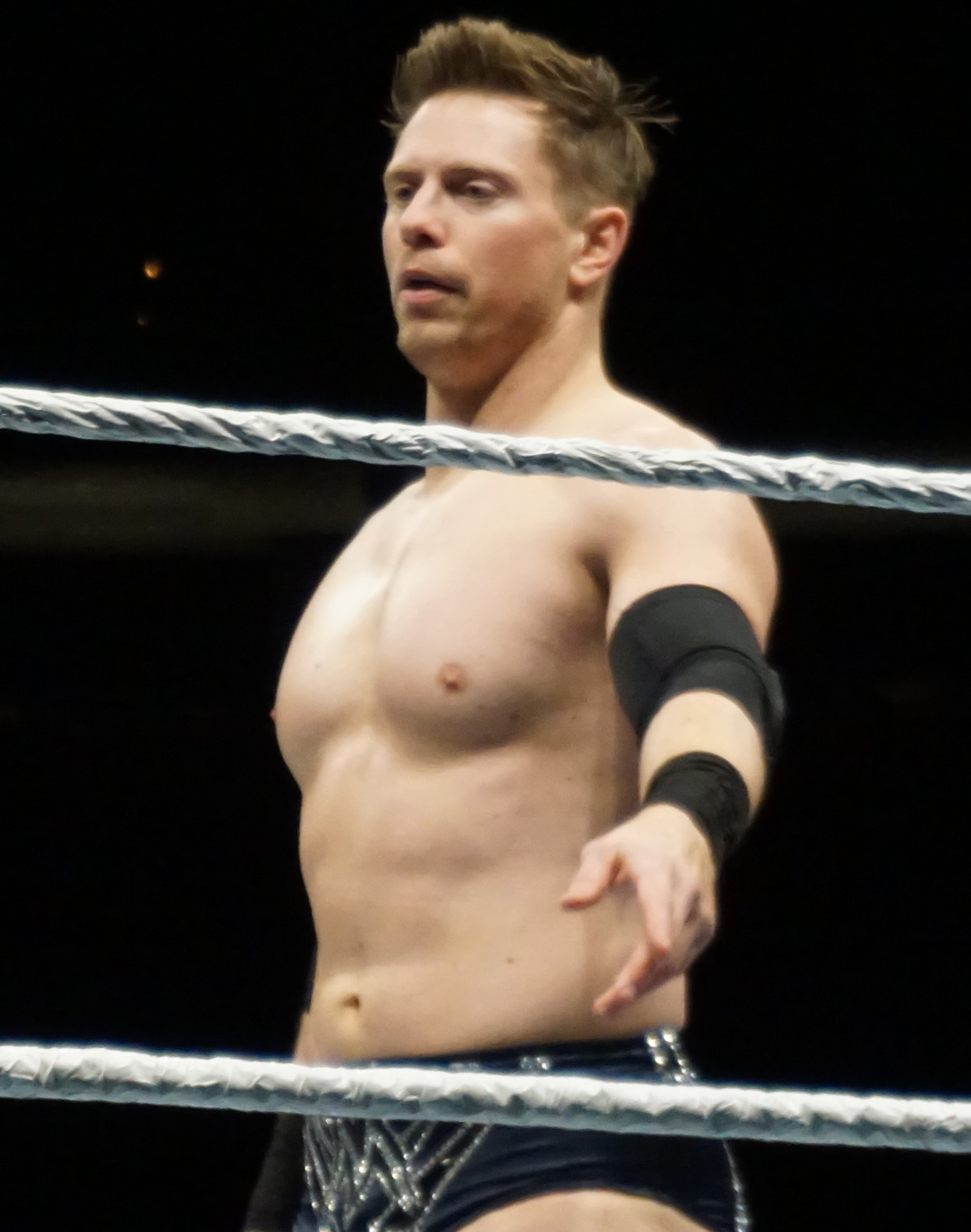
A WWE tie-in featured a Lumberjack match between Damian Priest and The Miz. The match was called "one of WWE's saddest moments ever" by the New York Post.

Shortly after, the trailer went viral, and Notaro was invited to The Tonight Show Starring Jimmy Fallon after her appearance as the cigar-smoking Marianne Peters received positive remarks on social media. On May 13, 2021, the first 15 minutes of the film were released online, as the last major marketing stunt for Army of the Dead before its release. To access the footage, viewers around the world were invited to watch a live stream on YouTube showing construction workers digging for, finding, and blowing up a vault buried in a desert. After the stream was over, the first 15 minutes became available for exactly 32 hours, the same amount of time the heist members had in the film to open the vault.

With Dave Bautista being a former professional wrestler for WWE, the company featured a marketing tie-in during their pay-per-view and WWE Network event, WrestleMania Backlash, which aired on May 16, 2021. In addition to Bautista doing a voice over for the show's opening vignette, a tie-in occurred during a match on the show. Wrestlers Damian Priest and The Miz faced each other in a Lumberjack match, which features other wrestlers (the "lumberjacks") surrounding the ring to keep the two competing wrestlers inside the ring; the lumberjacks for this match acted as zombies. The LED screens surrounding the arena also showed a post-apocalyptic city. While WWE received $1 million for the tie-in, the match, particularly the ending where Miz was seemingly eaten alive by the zombies, was panned by fans and critics, with the New York Post calling it "one of WWE's saddest moments ever."

== Release ==
The film was released for one week in 600 locations in the U.S. on May 14, 2021, including 330 Cinemark theaters, making it the first Netflix film to receive a wide release at a major theater chain and one of several to have Cinemark releases after The Midnight Sky, Ma Rainey's Black Bottom, and The Christmas Chronicles 2. On May 21, the film was digitally released on Netflix. A making-of documentary, titled Creating an Army of the Dead, was also released on May 21. Army of the Dead: The Making of the Film, a 192-page book written by Peter Aperlo featuring behind-the-scenes photography of filming sets, costume designs, and storyboards along with interviews, was released on June 1, 2021.

== Reception ==
=== Box office ===
Initial estimates said the film made approximately $265,000 on its first day of release, $323,000 on Saturday, and $192,000 on Sunday, grossing $780,000 over its opening weekend at 430–600 theaters. The figure was below industry projections, which had estimated a $1.5–2 million debut based on pre-sales, but had a better theatrical opening for a Netflix film compared to the $200,000 earned by Roma in 2018. Over its first 10 days of release, the film grossed over $1 million.

=== Audience viewership ===
In its first 28 days on Netflix, Army of the Dead was watched in 75 million households, totaling a viewership of 186.54 million hours. At the time of its release, the film tied with Project Power as the eighth most-watched original film on the streamer. According to Nielsen, it was the most-streamed-title in the U.S. for the week of May 17–23, with a viewership of 913 million minutes and 60% of its audience being male. In the following week, it had a viewership of 784 million minutes, making it the most-streamed-film on Netflix and the second most-streamed-title of the week. In the third week it fell to the sixth position among its film rankings with a viewership of 250 million minutes. The following week it fell to the tenth position among films, being viewed for 117 million minutes.

Following the release of Army of Thieves, the film acquired the seventh position on Netflix's rankings for week of October 25–31, 2021 with a viewership of 5.78 million hours, based on its updated methodology of measuring a film by the total number of hours it was viewed. The following week it rose to fourth position with a viewership of 16.91 million hours, while falling to the seventh position for the week of November 8–14 with a viewership of 7.62 million hours. Snyder revealed in July 2024 that the movie passed 150 million views.

Upon its streaming release some viewers criticized the film after finding several defective pixels on their screens.

=== Critical response ===
On the review aggregator website Rotten Tomatoes, 68% of 290 critics' reviews are positive, with an average rating of 6.1/10. The website's critical consensus reads, "An ambitious, over-the-top zombie heist mashup, Army of the Dead brings Zack Snyder back to his genre roots with a suitably gory splash." Metacritic, which uses a weighted average, assigned the film a score of 57 out of 100, based on 43 critics, indicating "mixed or average" reviews. PostTrak reported that 83% of audience members gave the film a positive score.

Collider reported that critics praised the film for its humor but criticized its runtime, which was 148 minutes, and found that it would appeal to fans of "both Snyder and ensemble action flicks." Brian Tallerico of RogerEbert.com said the film was better than Snyder's Dawn of the Dead but worse than any zombie film by George A. Romero, the creator of the original Dawn of the Dead (1978). While noting that the film was "pretty deliberate" and "lean" despite its runtime and criticizing its characters, Tallerico said the film was clever and gave positive remarks to its action sequences, writing that they were "the kind of fun, clever beats that keep Army of the Dead alive." Owen Gleiberman from Variety had a similar response, lauding it for being able to tackle several genres concurrently while also stating that it lacked substance, like "good diner food served with extra ketchup."

Writing for The New York Times, Jeannette Catsoulis praised the film's prologue and found the film to be a "weirdly mesmeric lump of splatter-pop filmmaking", but criticized most of the characters as unmemorable and tiresome, except for Schweighöfer and Notaro. Vanity Fair's Richard Lawson, on the other hand, commended Bautista's performance and the film's characters and cited the film as a return to form for Snyder. Richard Roeper of the Chicago Sun-Times gave the film three stars out of four, noting its excess of "horrific bloodshed", but wrote that it was an "extremely well-executed entry in the [zombie] genre with some wickedly sharp humor and the obligatory heartfelt family reconciliation moments sprinkled among the exploding heads and dripping entrails". For Time, Stephanie Zacharek summarized the feature film by writing that it was "too scattershot, perhaps too derivative and definitely too long. But it's definitely a movie, as well as a perfectly acceptable turn-your-brain-off entertainment."

== Franchise ==
In September 2020, Netflix announced that they had greenlit two prequels to Army of the Dead: a spin-off prequel film and an anime-style prequel series, to expand the franchise. A film serving as a direct sequel to Army of the Dead was later confirmed the following year.

=== Prequel ===
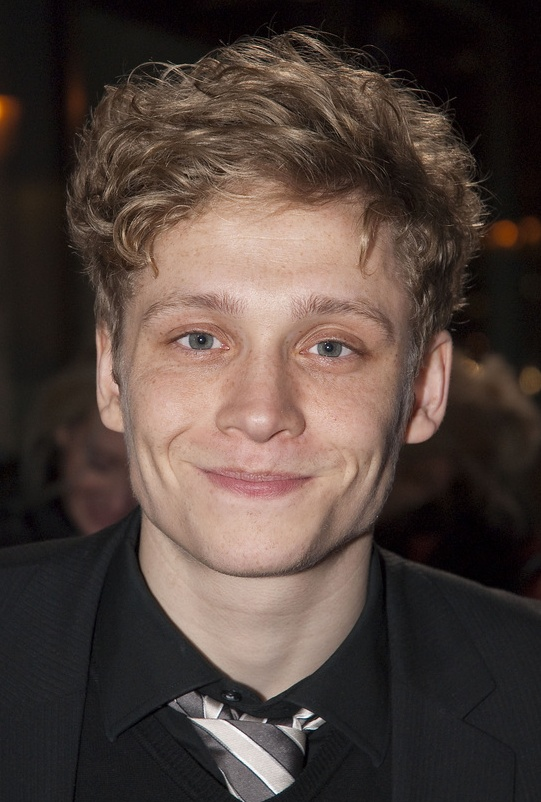
Army of Thieves director Matthias Schweighöfer

From a screenplay by Army of the Dead co-writer Shay Hatten, Schweighöfer directed, produced, and stars in Army of Thieves, a film set before the events of Army of the Dead that follows his character, Ludwig Dieter, during the early stages of the zombie outbreak. According to Schweighöfer, he did not know about the project until after filming for Army of the Dead had concluded. The film also stars Nathalie Emmanuel, Guz Khan, Ruby O. Fee, Stuart Martin, Jonathan Cohen, Noemie Nakai, Peter Simonischek, and John Bubniak. Production on the film concluded in December 2020. The film was released by Netflix on October 29, 2021.

=== Cancelled projects ===
The anime-style series Army of the Dead: Lost Vegas also serves as a prequel and follows several characters during the start of the zombie outbreak. When asked about the series, Ana de la Reguera said that "you'll get to learn what's Cruz's backstory, how she and Dave Bautista's character, Scott Ward, met, what we were doing before. We show it in the movie a little bit, that we used to work together. We were war veterans and all of that. But you'll get to see more of the action before, how we were fighting zombies before. I can't reveal much but it's a lot of fun." Along with Reguera and Bautista, the series also has Ella Purnell, Tig Notaro, and Omari Hardwick reprising their roles from the film. Snyder has also said that the animated series would explore the "ambiguity" to the origin of the zombies, including the "robot zombies" that are seen in the film. In March 2023, Snyder mentioned that the series has been stalled due to "technical reasons". In November 2023, in an interview from Total Film magazine, Snyder stated that the project was mostly complete with "all the scripts and the animatics, and all the voices are recorded" and that "you could watch it, even in its crazy animatic form – you can watch the whole run" though referred to it as the series "we never did".

In May 2021, Zack Snyder mentioned the possibility of a sequel and said in an interview, "I'm knocking on wood right here, but if there was an opportunity for a sequel, Shay [Hatten] and I know exactly what happens with that. Now, of course, if we were to do a sequel to this, it continues the zombie story. It takes it even further." Producer Deborah Snyder implied that the sequel could be set in New Mexico, an "intentional" choice, and said that there was "still more story to tell, and I know that Zack and Shay have a lot of ideas that are kind of fleshed out. If there was an appetite for another film, I think we're ready to go." A sequel was confirmed to be in development in July 2021, with Hatten and Snyder working on a story. Snyder said he will tackle the project after he finishes working on his next film, Rebel Moon. In October 2021, the sequel's title was revealed to be Planet of the Dead. That same month, Snyder teased the return of Dieter and Army of Thieves character Gwendoline Starr.

In an interview with Total Film in November 2023, Snyder stated that the Rebel Moon and Army of the Dead franchises "definitely a shared universe" elaborating that the characters from the stalled animated series Army of the Dead: Lost Vegas "go through a portal into another dimension, and there are characters in that other dimension" saying that "one of the aliens (in Rebel Moon) is one of the characters from the animatic (of Army of the Dead: Lost Vegas)".

== See also ==
- List of films set in Las Vegas
