= Fabiola Beracasa Beckman =

Film and TV producer and philanthropist

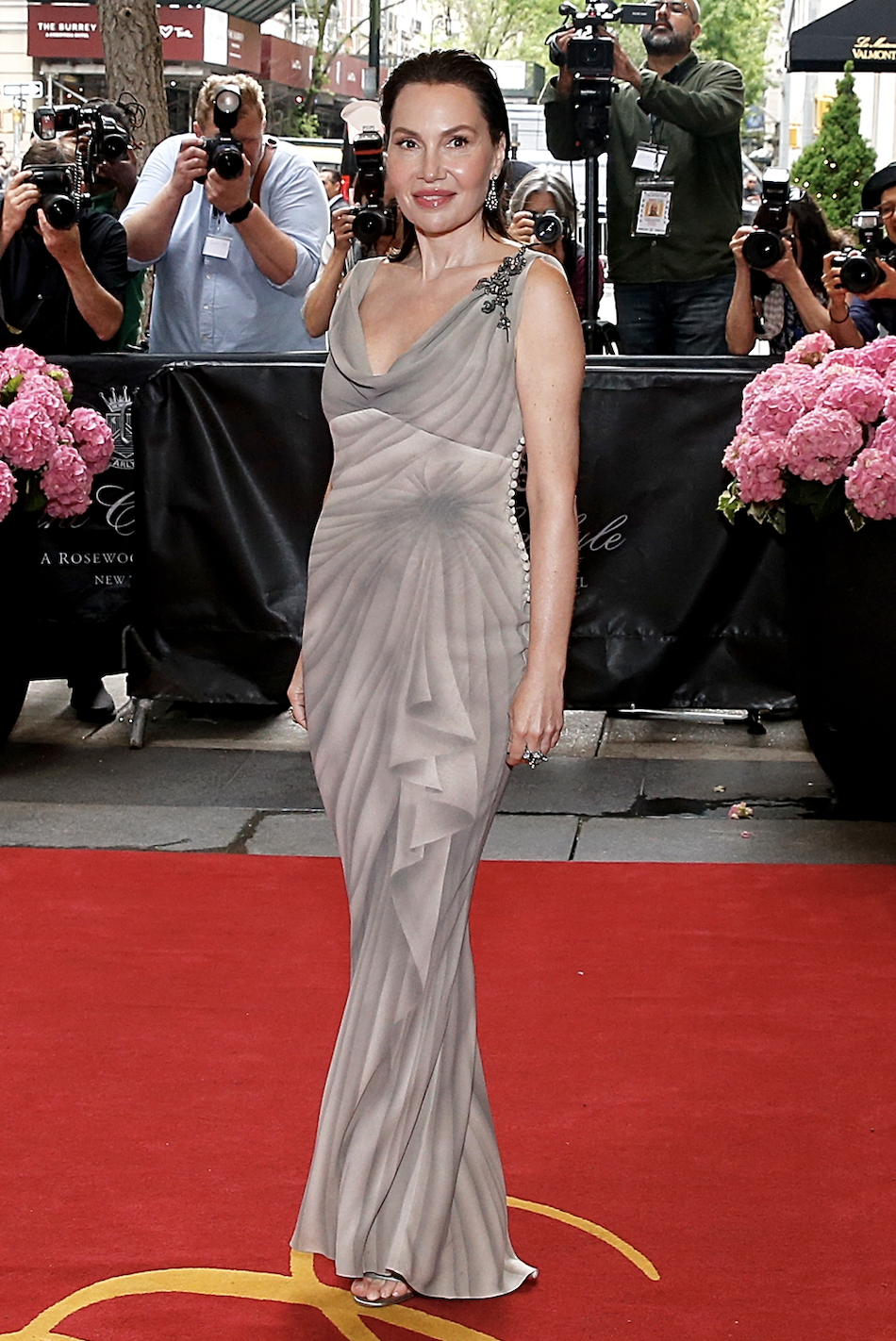
- Born: Maria Fabiola Beracasa; 1976 Caracas, Venezuela
- Other name: Fabiola Beracasa Beckman
- Education: Boston College
- Occupation: Film Producer
- Years active: 2014-present
- Spouse: Jason Beckman
- Children: 3

Fabiola Beracasa Beckman is a film and television producer, philanthropist and socialite. She was born in Caracas, Venezuela. She was the producer of 2014 biographical drama film Desert Dancer, the 2016 documentary The First Monday in May, and the 2024 documentary Diane von Furstenberg: Woman In Charge.

== Early life and education ==
Beracasa Beckman was born Maria Fabiola Beracasa. Her father is Alfredo Beracasa, a Venezuelan banker and industrialist. Her mother, Veronica Hearst, married Randolph Apperson Hearst in 1987. Beracasa Beckman attended the Brillantmont boarding school in Lausanne, Switzerland, and later attended Boston College.

== Career ==
While attending school, Beracasa Beckman had a summer internship spanning 4 years at Chanel's Paris studio. She worked at the New York office of Christian Dior overseeing special events.

Beracasa Beckman was creative director for Circa, a company that places fine and antique jewelry with dealers and private collectors around the world, until 2008. She has been a contributing editor for ELLE, Architectural Digest, and Interview Magazine,

She is co-owner and creative director at The Hole Gallery in New York City, and serves on the fashion advisory board of Mercado Global.

== Film career ==
Beracasa Beckman is producer of "Desert Dancer," a 2014 film starring Freida Pinto about an Iranian dancer who strived to reach his dream despite dance being forbidden in Iran. She also produces The Grant, a TV show where social entrepreneurs compete for funding. Beracasa Beckman founded Planted Projects, a production company, in 2015. In the same year she founded pARTicle Projects, a multimedia company.

Beracasa Beckman produced the film, The First Monday in May, a documentary about the 2015 Metropolitan Museum of Art's gala and spring exhibition, China: Through the Looking Glass. The film was directed by Andrew Rossi and opened the 2016 Tribeca Film Festival. In 2021 she produced documentary Meat Me Halfway.

In 2024, she produced Diane von Furstenberg: Woman in Charge, co-directed by Sharmeen Obaid-Chinoy and Trish Dalton. The film was slated to be released on Hulu on June 25, 2024.

== Filmography ==
- 2014: Desert Dancer
- 2016: The First Monday in May
- 2016: Meat Me Halfway
- 2024: Diane von Furstenberg: Woman In Charge

== Philanthropy ==
She is a board member of the Art Production Fund, and an adviser for the New York Academy of Arts. She is a member of Friends of Finn, an organization which spreads awareness about puppy mills.

Snap-X, which stands for spay, neuter, adopt, and protect, is a Petfinder Foundation charity which Beracasa Beckman operates and founded.

Beracasa Beckman works with the International Rescue Committee. In 2017, she organized a fundraising event for the global humanitarian aid organization with Dolce & Gabbana. In 2018, she was named Fashion 4 Development’s Goodwill Ambassador.

== Personal life ==
Beracasa Beckman lives in New York with her husband Jason Beckman, the founder of Colbeck Capital Management whom she married in June 2014, and their two sons and daughter.
