= Shay Hatten =

American screenwriter and producer

- Born: March 18, 1994 (age 32); Oakland, California, U.S.
- Education: Loyola Marymount University
- Occupations: Screenwriter; film producer
- Years active: 2019–present

Shay Hatten (born March 18, 1994) is an American screenwriter and producer. He is best known for his work on the John Wick sequels Chapter 3 – Parabellum (2019) and Chapter 4 (2023) and its spin off Ballerina (2025), Zack Snyder's Army of the Dead (2021) and Rebel Moon (2023–2024) film series, and Zach Cregger's Resident Evil (2026).

== Early life ==
Hatten was born in Oakland, California. He graduated from Moscow High School in 2012 and Loyola Marymount University's School of Film and Television in 2016.

== Career ==
After graduating, Hatten started his career as an intern and then writing assistant at Team Downey. While there, he wrote his first spec script titled Maximum King!, which focuses on Stephen King during production on his only directorial feature film, Maximum Overdrive. The script was later voted onto the 2016 Black List. He went on to write another script on spec titled Ballerina, which was purchased by Lionsgate in 2017 to be produced by John Wick production company Thunder Road Films. Hatten credited the tone of Ballerina with what led to him being brought onto the John Wick: Chapter 3 – Parabellum writing team and later John Wick: Chapter 4.

Hatten also wrote a number of scripts that Zack Snyder would produce starting with the 2021 Netflix films Army of the Dead and its prequel Army of Thieves, followed by a two-parter epic space opera Rebel Moon – Part One: A Child of Fire, and its follow-up, Rebel Moon – Part Two: The Scargiver.

For television, he wrote pilot episodes for (Future) Cult Classic, a satirical television series, and I Know What You Did Last Summer, for which he also received executive producer credit.

== Filmography ==
Film

Year	Title	Director
2019	John Wick: Chapter 3 – Parabellum	Chad Stahelski
2021	Army of the Dead	Zack Snyder
2021	Army of Thieves	Matthias Schweighöfer
2022	Day Shift	J. J. Perry
2023	John Wick: Chapter 4	Chad Stahelski
2023	Rebel Moon – Part One: A Child of Fire	Zack Snyder
2024	Rebel Moon – Part Two: The Scargiver	Zack Snyder
2025	Ballerina	Len Wiseman
2026	Resident Evil	Zach Cregger

Television

Year	Title	Writer	Executive producer	Notes
2019	(Future) Cult Classic	Yes	Yes	Episode: "Pilot"
2021	I Know What You Did Last Summer	Yes	Yes	Episode: "It's Thursday"
