= My Blind Brother =

- Theatrical release poster
- Directed by: Sophie Goodhart
- Written by: Sophie Goodhart
- Produced by: Tyler Davidson; Tory Tunnell
- Starring: Adam Scott; Nick Kroll; Jenny Slate; Zoe Kazan; Charlie Hewson
- Cinematography: Eric Lin
- Edited by: Jennifer Lee
- Music by: Ian Hultquist
- Production companies: Low Spark Films; Safehouse Pictures; Think Media Studios
- Distributed by: Orion Pictures; Starz Digital
- Release dates: March 12, 2016 (South by Southwest); September 23, 2016 (United States)
- Running time: 85 minutes
- Country: United States
- Language: English

My Blind Brother is a 2016 American romantic comedy-drama film directed by Sophie Goodhart. The film is based on the director's short film which was nominated for the Palme d'Or in 2003. It stars Adam Scott, Nick Kroll, Jenny Slate, Zoe Kazan and Charlie Hewson. The film had its world premiere at South by Southwest on March 12, 2016. The film was released on September 23, 2016, as a limited release and through video on demand by Orion Pictures and Starz Digital.

== Premise ==
An overachieving blind man and his unaccomplished brother compete for the same woman.

== Cast ==
- Adam Scott as Robbie Saunders
- Nick Kroll as Bill Saunders
- Jenny Slate as Rose Anderson
- Zoe Kazan as Francie Don
- Charlie Hewson as GT
- Maryann Nagel as Jane
- Greg Violand as Phill
- Talia Tabin as Micia
- Heidi Lewandowski as Clarese Singer

== Production ==
My Blind Brother was filmed in Northeast Ohio, with one of the water scenes shot on Sheffield Lake, Ohio. The final "cut" of the film was made on a Thursday at Lorain's Lakeview Park. The film took a month to produce.

== Release ==
The film premiered at the South by Southwest festival on March 12, 2016. On March 15, 2016, it was reported that Starz had acquired North and Latin American distribution rights to the film, beating out companies including Netflix, the Orchard, Sony Pictures, and Gravitas Ventures. The film was released on September 23, 2016, in a limited release and through video on demand.

== Reception ==
On review aggregator website Rotten Tomatoes, the film has an approval rating of 81% based on 36 reviews, with an average ranking of 6.3/10. The site's critical consensus reads, "My Blind Brother takes a refreshingly character-driven approach to its familiar sibling rivalry while adding a somewhat unexpected twist." On Metacritic, the film has a weighted average score of 60 out of a 100 based on 12 critics, indicating "mixed or average reviews".

Andrew Barker of Variety gave the film a positive review, writing that the film "takes an ostensibly dark premise — a man of few qualities attempts to steal his overachieving blind brother’s girlfriend — and turns it into a featherweight frolic as winningly unambitious as its central couple played by Nick Kroll and Jenny Slate."

Ben Kenigsberg of The New York Times called the film "A thoroughly harmless comedy that spaces its one-liners a bit widely". In a review for The Seattle Times, Tom Keogh praised the film's "love-hate energy", especially when it comes to "Robbie's condescension [and] Bill's passive-aggressiveness".

Dmitry Samarov of Chicago Reader wrote "Zoe Kazan provides the only compelling moments... yet playing the normal one among such a group of narcissists is a thankless task". Scott Marks of San Diego Reader said that "First-time director Sophie Goodhart coaxes a grown-up performance out of Kroll, and Scott's smarmy contentiousness has never been put to better use".

According to Jesse Hassenger of The A.V. Club, "[the film] is slight and a little easy, but it's powered by sincere affection". John DeFore of The Hollywood Reporter opinion was that the film is "Enjoyable, if not a laugh riot".

Kevin P. Sullivan of Entertainment Weekly had a different take on the film. His response was "Though My Blind Brother clearly isn't aiming for the feel-good realm, the emotions never ring true enough to make any of the purposely flawed leads relatable, never mind likable".
