= The First Monday in May =

- Directed by: Andrew Rossi
- Produced by: Fabiola Beracasa Beckman; Sylvana Ward Durrett; Dawn Ostroff; Matthew Weaver; Skot Bright
- Music by: Ian Hultquist; Sofia Hultquist
- Distributed by: Magnolia Pictures
- Release date: April 13, 2016
- Running time: 90 minutes
- Country: United States

The First Monday in May is a 2016 documentary film directed by Andrew Rossi. The film follows the creation of the Metropolitan Museum of Art's most attended fashion exhibit in history: the 2015 art exhibition China: Through the Looking Glass by curator Andrew Bolton at New York's Metropolitan Museum of Art.

The documentary was produced by Fabiola Beracasa Beckman, Dawn Ostroff and Sylvana Ward Durrett and distributed by Magnolia Pictures.

== Synopsis ==
The First Monday in May chronicles a year's worth of preparations for the Chinese-inspired fashion exhibit China: Through the Looking Glass and the gala which accompanied the exhibit. The exhibit featured 150 garments from 40 designers. Andrew Bolton, the chief curator at the Costume Institute, conceptualizes and designs the Metropolitan Museum of Art Gala with Anna Wintour. The Met Gala, the Costume Institute's annual event, is a multimillion-dollar fundraiser. The film also depicts Wintour's daily life and questions fashion as art. As of 2016, China: Through the Looking Glass is the most visited exhibit in the Costume Institute's history and one of the most visited exhibitions in the entire history of the Metropolitan Museum of Art.

== Cast ==
- Andrew Bolton
- John Galliano
- Jean Paul Gaultier
- Karl Lagerfeld
- Baz Luhrmann
- Rihanna
- Anna Wintour
- Wong Kar-wai
- Lady Gaga

== Release ==
The First Monday in May was first shown on April 13, 2016, as the opening film of the 2016 Tribeca Film Festival.

=== Reception ===
The First Monday in May was received mostly positively by critics, though some noted that the documentary expressed little criticism for its subjects, and was more focused on merely displaying the spectacle of the event. Review aggregator website Rotten Tomatoes reports an approval rating of 77% based on 60 reviews, with the site's critics' consensus reading: "[The] First Monday in May may not resonate far beyond its target demographic, but for fashion aficionados, it should prove utterly absorbing." The film received a lower rating from Metacritic of 57 (mixed or average), based on 19 reviews.

Writing in The Guardian, film critic Peter Bradshaw gave the film two out of five stars, writing that the documentary was "glossy, but frankly somewhat saucer-eyed", and that despite the admirable "star power" brought by the documentary's subjects, "there is obviously a huge amount of status envy going on; the film does not care to break that down too thoroughly, save for a single witnessed wisecrack about poor old Josh Hartnett." Bradshaw also noted that John Galliano's "recent disgrace" was only fleetingly alluded to, and treated with some degree of denial. The film was reviewed more positively in The Observer by critic Wendy Ide, who gave the film four out of five stars, writing that Wintour's presence was "compelling".

The film was also given two stars by critic Mark Dujisk, who also noted that the film's introduction of "the debate about fashion's status as Art in the documentary's opening scenes" was soon moved past, and though returned to later in the film, remained unsatisfactory: "Later, Rossi returns to the dispute in a bit more detail (mostly by juxtaposing interviews with fashion designers who are of opposing opinions on the subject), but by that point, it doesn't matter. The movie has answered the question for itself, and it has moved on to its real purpose: to offer an inside look at the creation of the Costume Institute's 2015 exhibit about fashions inspired by Chinese culture." Time Out magazine awarded the movie four out of five stars, rated "Recommended", with critic Kate Lloyd opining that though the access granted by the documentary to the event was "captivating", the film's most compelling aspect was the exhibition being put together itself, rather than questions posed in the film's introduction about the place of fashion and celebrity in a museum: "The clothes [Bolton]'s picking are beautiful, but the majority of them are by white Western designers who openly admit to being inspired by movies and a fantasy of [China's] women, thus appropriating its culture." Lloyd also noted that both Bolton and Wintour were shown being challenged by journalists and the exhibition's collaborators - both majority Chinese - for "playing into orientalism and stereotyping", and concluded that "whether Rossi knows it or not, this is one of the most compelling discussions of appropriation and the ignorance of the fashion world in ages."

Writing in IndieWire, journalist Kimber Myers commented that: ""The First Monday in May" also tries to answer accusations of vapidity in the fashion world by addressing a large number of issues, including cultural sensitivity, Orientalism and feminism. It's a sometimes ambitious offering, but it never really fully explores the topics it raises...Like a gown that has one too many decorative elements, "The First Monday in May" has just a little too much going on in its exploration of the Met Gala and the Costume Institute. Though it delves into a number of topics beyond fashion, it refrains from breaking through the glossy surface." Myers commented on a "particularly telling scene" wherein a Chinese journalist queried how the country would be presented in the exhibit, which both Wintour and Bolton "awkwardly [attempted] to answer", and pointed out in particular the "constant emphasis on how the exhibit is a "fantasized vision of China," which is supposed to explain why most of the designs shown are from American and European designers". However, more positively, Myers lauded Wintour's depiction in the film as a celebrated feminist trailblazer, "who wouldn't be as criticized for her ambition and demeanor if she were a man."
