= The Diabolical =

- Directed by: Alistair Legrand
- Written by: Alistair Legrand; Luke Harvis
- Produced by: Ross Dinerstein
- Starring: Ali Larter; Arjun Gupta; Max Rose; Chloe Perrin; Kurt Carley; Merrin Dungey; Patrick Fischler
- Cinematography: John Frost
- Edited by: Blair Miller
- Music by: Ian Hultquist
- Distributed by: XLrator Media
- Release date: March 16, 2015 (SXSW)
- Running time: 86 minutes
- Country: United States
- Language: English
- Box office: $84,259

The Diabolical is a 2015 American science fiction horror film directed by Alistair Legrand and written by Legrand and Luke Harvis. It stars Ali Larter as a single mother who battles evil forces in her house. It premiered at SXSW in March 2015 and, after being released internationally, received a limited release in the US in October 2015.

== Plot ==
Madison, a single mother, lives with her two children, Jacob and Hayleigh, in a suburban home. Madison's financial difficulties prompt her to consider declaring bankruptcy. Jacob was involved in a fight six months prior and now sees a counselor to evaluate his state of mind. Madison is dating her son's science tutor, Nikolai. The family experiences paranormal occurrences that manifest as a bloody and bound apparition and a bald man. Although Madison hires parapsychologists and psychics to investigate the haunting, none can help her. A man representing a research lab called CamSET makes an offer on their house in the hopes of developing the area. One night while the bald apparition attempts to harm the children, they attempt to flee the house, but the children become deathly ill whenever they leave. Madison decides that they all have to stay in the house until a solution can be found.

Nikolai arrives and witnesses one of the apparitions. They set up scientific monitoring equipment to find a solution to the paranormal phenomenon. The bald man materializes and attacks the family, causing them to run upstairs, where the bald man's fingers are severed in a doorway. While analyzing the footage captured of the bald man, Madison discovers that he is wearing a shirt from CamSET. After searching online she finds a reference to Project ECHO and that Nikolai was previously employed by CamSET. Nikolai explains that they were working on teleportation with human subjects, but he left over ethical concerns. The project was at least forty years until completion, so Nikolai deduces that the bald man must be coming from the future. Madison and Nikolai set traps and make improvised weapons in hopes of killing the bald man when he rematerializes.

They beat the bald man into submission. The police arrive but are quickly killed when the bald man reawakens, and Nikolai is rendered unconscious. Madison attempts to protect her children in the basement but is seriously wounded. Her son receives a cut on his right cheek that instantly appears on the bald man's face, and Madison realizes that the bald man is her son Jacob from the future. Nikolai regains consciousness and shoots the bald man in the back with one of the dead police officers' guns. Madison lies next to the bald man and is transported to the future. There it is explained that her son was captured trying to burn the lab down because of something CamSET did to his mother. He was subsequently lobotomized and used as a test subject in Project ECHO forty years in the future. Madison is healed and sent back to her own time, where she stares straight ahead while her son embraces her.

== Cast ==
- Ali Larter as Madison
- Arjun Gupta as Nikolai
- Max Rose as Jacob
- Chloe Perrin as Haley
- Kurt Carley as The Prisoner
- Merrin Dungey as Mrs. Wallace
- Patrick Fischler as Austin Hamilton
- Wilmer Calderon as Miguel
- Tom Wright as Curtis
- Laura Margolis as Marcy
- Joe Egender as Carl
- Ethan Josh Lee as Nerdy Friend
- Thomas Kuc as Danny

== Production ==
Larter said that although she liked the mix of genres in the film, what drew her to it was the family dynamic and her character's struggle to protect her children. Legrand said he wanted to make a film that blends science fiction and horror elements together. He was influenced by David Cronenberg for the reality-based monsters, Steven Spielberg's emphasis on likable characters, and John Carpenter's long takes. He also cited how Alien hid its monster, which he said heightened the tension. Legrand did not want to distract audiences with ostentatious homage, so he borrowed only small amounts from each filmmaker. The special effects were practical, a decision that Legrand said aided actors in believably reacting to the threats in the film. Filming took place in February 2014.

== Release ==
The Diabolical premiered at SXSW on March 17, 2015. It was released in Thailand on August 12 and in Malaysia on October 1, 2015. The total international gross was $84,259. XLrator Media released it in the US on October 16, 2015, via video on demand and in theaters.

== Reception ==
Rotten Tomatoes, a review aggregator, reports that 40% of 10 surveyed critics gave the film a positive review; the average rating is 4.4/10. On Metacritic, the film has a score of 25 out of 100 based on four reviews, indicating "generally unfavorable reviews".

Drew Tinnin of Dread Central rated it 1.5/5 stars and wrote, "The Diabolical just doesn’t do enough with its entire running time and it serves as an example of how the new model of an old horror trope with a new twist is growing tired as well." Howard Gorman of Scream magazine rated it 4/5 stars and wrote, "With such an imaginative script this film is destined for infinite revisits as you'll want to pinpoint all the telltale signs and clues you missed out on." Gary Goldstein of the Los Angeles Times wrote, "The Diabolical is a tepid horror-thriller that never manages to sell, much less clarify, its potentially ambitious concept." Maitland McDonagh of Film Journal International called it an "ambitious, downbeat psychological horror movie" that might not appeal to traditional horror film fans who dislike slow-burn family dramas.
