= Dario Calmese =

American artist and podcaster

Dario Calmese is the first African American to photograph the cover of Vanity Fair. He is an artist and podcaster originally from Missouri. Calmese is the host of the podcast Institute of Black Imagination.

== Career ==
He began photography in 2012 while attending the School of Visual Arts. His photos of Harlem fashion collector Lana Turner were part of a special exhibition in 2015. In 2013 he became the casting director for Kerby Jean-Raymond's fashion shows and then the director. In 2019, he directed the Pyer Moss show at Kings Theater in Brooklyn. For the July/August 2020 cover of Vanity Fair he photographed Viola Davis. Calmese has worked for Vanity Fair in the past as well, although this was his first major magazine cover, and the first magazine cover for Vanity Fair shot by an African American photographer. He previously shot actor Billy Porter, actor George MacKay and Broadway star Adrienne Warren for the magazine.
