= Memoria (2015 film) =

2015 film by Vladimir de Fontenay and Nina Ljeti

- Theatrical release poster
- Directed by: Nina Ljeti; Vladimir de Fontenay
- Screenplay by: Nina Ljeti; Vladimir de Fontenay
- Based on: Palo Alto & California Childhood by James Franco
- Produced by: Iris Torres; Sev Ohanian; Nicolaas Bertelsen; Sam Slater; Paul M. Bernon; Jay Karales
- Starring: Sam Dillon; Thomas Mann; Ruby Modine; Keith Stanfield; Miles Heizer; Bo Mitchell; Matt McCoy; James Franco
- Cinematography: Pedro Gómez Millán
- Edited by: John Paul Horstmann
- Music by: Ian Hultquist
- Production company: Rabbit Bandini Productions
- Distributed by: Monterey Media
- Release dates: November 1, 2015 (AFF); April 8, 2016 (United States)
- Running time: 70 minutes
- Country: United States
- Language: English
- Box office: US$2,242

Memoria is a 2015 American film directed and written by Vladimir de Fontenay and Nina Ljeti. It is based on a short story by James Franco, who stars in the film. It was released at the Austin Film Festival in November 2015, then an American release came out April 8, 2016. As of July 2020, all five of the reviews compiled by Rotten Tomatoes are positive, with an average rating of 7 out of 10.

== Plot ==
Ivan Cohen is a young boy living in Palo Alto, California. The film begins when Ivan is a young boy and his life with his mother, a Russian immigrant, and his American step-father. Ivan appears unsatisfied with his childhood and his step-father is unable to forge a relationship with the boy. Ivan seems unhappy, noting that people only talk to him about his blonde hair, pale skin, and his Russian army jacket, all of which came from his Russian father.

Later, when Ivan is a young teen he is seen with his group of working class slacker friends and Ivan is shown to be alienated from them, although a bond appears to have formed with a female friend, Nina. Ivan appears to be jealous of a relationship between his friend Alex and a pretty girl named Kelly. Alex and Kelly's relationship continues into high school where Ivan continues to be bothered by it.

In high school Ivan tags along with his group of friends that still include Alex and Nina. Ivan is clearly a follower with this group and does not appear motivated to change his position even though he is clearly not content. One night after the group of friends take acid, they are involved in a minor car accident appearing to have struck an animal. This event shakes up Ivan. During high school one of Ivan's teachers, Mr. Wyckoff appears concerned about Ivan's struggles and attempts to get Ivan to open up to him. Ivan ignores and is angered by Mr. Wyckoff's attempts until he suggests a writing assignment that interests Ivan. After writing a fantasy story about his future life after high school in San Francisco that shows Ivan's dreams to be of very low aspirations yet nevertheless seem to be desirable to him, he heads to an "end of High School" party. At the party he is bored with his friends and heads off and finds Nina. Nina jokingly tells him that after high school she wants to rob banks and live in mansions and wants him to go with her. Ivan sees this as an opportunity and tries to kiss Nina. Nina rejects Ivan's advances as they are just friends and they argue about it. After Nina goes back to the party Ivan returns elsewhere in the party and to add to his anguish over the fight with Nina he walks in on a group of boys watching two people have sex in one of the bedrooms. Ivan is further disturbed when, in another room, he sees someone passed out in their own vomit. Ivan angrily heads downstairs looking for alcohol and after taking a beer another teen accuses him of stealing it and then punches Ivan. Ivan, after a terrible night, leaves and runs home where he grabs his step-father's hunting rifle and drives back to the party intent on shooting the place up. However, when he arrives the only people left are a few passed out kids and he can find no one to release his anger upon. He heads home and enters his parents room where they are sleeping intent on killing his step-father but nerves don't allow him to do so.

The film ends with Ivan standing on the Golden Gate Bridge looking out and leaving his father's jacket on the bridge.

== Cast ==
- Sam Dillon as Ivan
  - Kaden Ecklund as 6-year-old Ivan
  - Skyler Verity as 13-year-old Ivan
- Thomas Mann as Alex
  - Teo Halm as 13-year-old Alex
- Ruby Modine as Nina
  - Luna Blaise as 13-year-old Nina
- LaKeith Stanfield as Max
  - Jacob Henry as 13-year-old Max
- Miles Heizer as Simon
- Bo Mitchell as Chris
- Malia Pyles as Tasha
- Julia Emelin as Irena Goodman
- Megan Murphy as Kelly
  - Lexi DiBenedetto as 13-year-old Kelly
- Cody Kennedy as Nathasha Illichev
- Matt McCoy as Harry Goodman
- James Franco as Mr. Wyckoff
- Shauna Bloom as Mrs. Kerrigan
- Cole Alexander as Dickey Ferriante
- Evan Moore as Ashley
- Doua Moua as Takeshi Motoki
- Johanna Braddy as Joanne
- Angela Bullock as Mrs. Fontaine
- Jerry Hauck as Dean Schmidt
- Casey Simpson as Brian
