= Dawn Ostroff =

American businesswoman

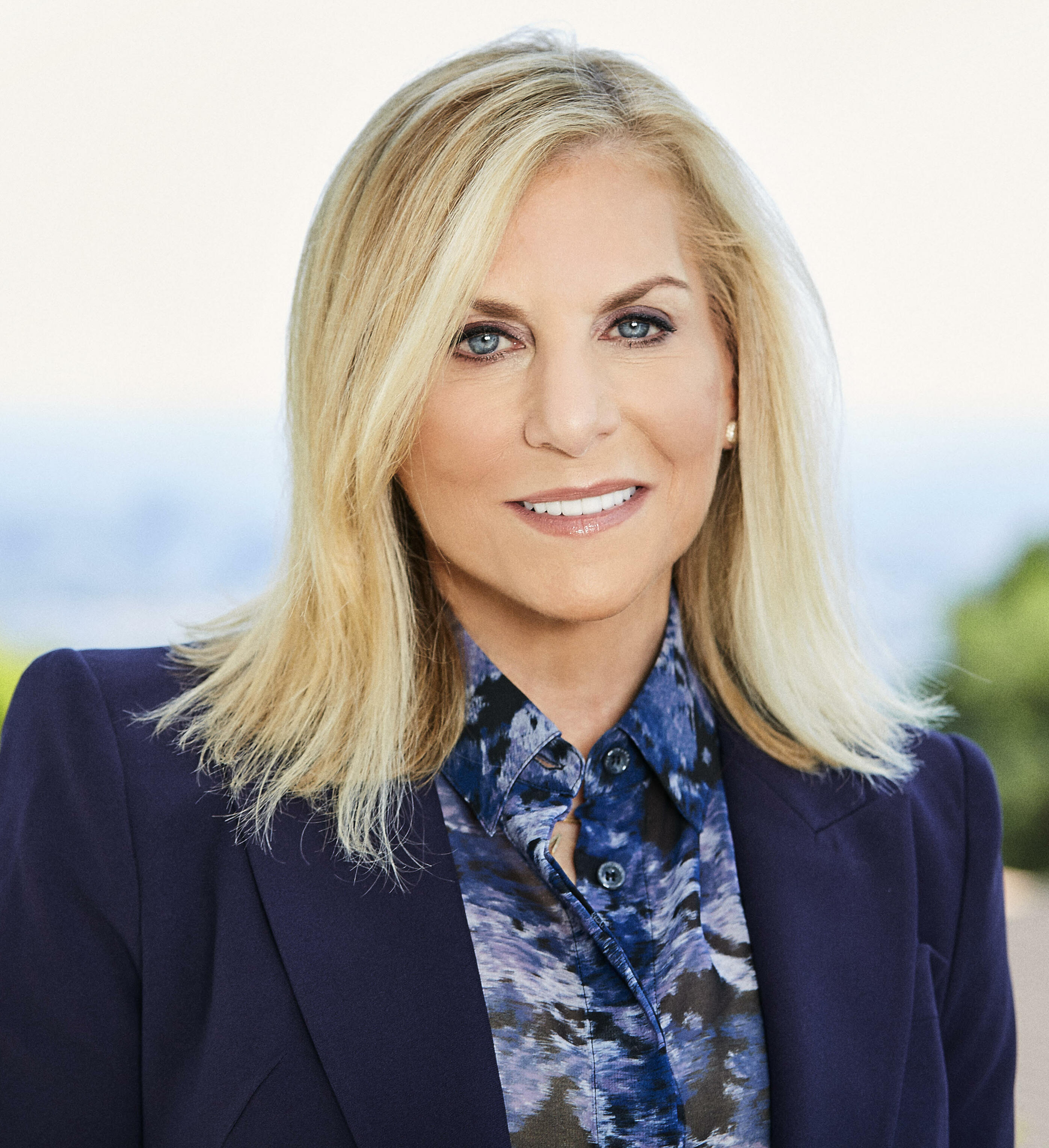
- Ostroff in 2021
- Born: 1964 (age 61–62); Brooklyn, New York City, New York
- Education: Florida International University
- Occupations: Chief content officer and Advertising business officer, Spotify
- Employer(s): Spotify, Condé Nast Entertainment, The CW & UPN
- Known for: Media and technology executive
- Board member of: Mattel, Moloco, Sweetgreen
- Spouse: Mark Ostroff
- Children: 4

Dawn Ostroff is an American businesswoman. She is currently on the board of directors of Moloco and is an independent director on the boards of Mattel and Sweetgreen. She is the former chief content officer and advertising business officer of Spotify, the former president of entertainment of The CW, and the former president of Condé Nast Entertainment.

== Early life and education ==
Ostroff was born in Brooklyn, New York in 1964. She had an early introduction to music, her father being a concert promoter who worked with Frank Sinatra. Ostroff holds a Bachelor of Science degree from Florida International University.

== Career ==
Ostroff began her career in news as a reporter for WINZ, a CBS affiliate in Miami. She also worked in local news at WPLG and WTVJ in Miami. She later held senior positions at 20th Century Fox, Michael Jacobs Productions (Disney) and the Kushner-Locke Company.

=== Lifetime ===
From 1996 to 2002, she served as executive vice president of entertainment at Lifetime Television and led the network to become the #1-rated cable network in prime time.

=== UPN Network ===
From 2002 to 2006, Ostroff served as president of the UPN Network, a subsidiary of CBS, where she developed the popular reality series America's Next Top Model, along with other programs including Veronica Mars and Everybody Hates Chris.

=== The CW ===
Beginning in 2006, Ostroff launched The CW broadcast network - a joint venture of CBS and Warner Bros. - and served as president of entertainment. Ostroff was in charge of programming, digital initiatives, branding, marketing, research and sales. As president, she developed several TV series, including Gossip Girl and The Vampire Diaries.

=== Condé Nast Entertainment ===
Ostroff and Condé Nast CEO Bob Sauerberg co-founded and launched Condé Nast Entertainment (CNE) in 2011, a studio and distribution network for film, television, premium digital video, social, and virtual reality. At CNE, Ostroff produced film projects including Only the Brave, adapted from a GQ feature; The First Monday in May; The Old Man & the Gun with Robert Redford as well as TV series including Last Chance U on Netflix and Vanity Fair Confidential on Investigation Discovery. Additionally, through its digital franchises, such as Vogue's "73 Questions" and WIRED's "Autocomplete Interview," CNE made 5,000 videos, garnering more than 11 billion views in 2017.

=== Spotify ===
Ostroff joined Spotify in August 2018 as Chief Content Officer. She led all aspects of content and distribution operations, including global advertising, global original content, content marketing, industry and creator relationships, and licensing.

During Ostroff's time as Chief Content Officer, she focused on expanding the music streaming service into other forms of audio, primarily podcasts. She signed Barack and Michelle Obama's production company, Higher Ground Productions, to produce a slate of exclusive podcasts for Spotify. She also negotiated exclusive podcast deals with Kim Kardashian West, Joe Rogan, Prince Harry and Meghan Markle. She is also responsible for overseeing the acquisitions of digital media company and podcast network Gimlet Media, the podcast creation tool Anchor, digital media firm Parcast, and Bill Simmons's The Ringer.

Ostroff helped Spotify increase the number of podcasts from 185,000 to 3 million, as of January 2022, and in 2020, the company's stock more than doubled.

In January 2023, it was announced that Ostroff would be departing Spotify.

== Board memberships ==
Ostroff serves on the board of New York University College of Arts & Science. In June 2020, Activision Blizzard appointed her to its board as an independent director. She has also served on the board of directors for Westfield Corporation and on the City Year LA board. Ostroff is also one of the listed directors for the Tom Brady-backed digital NFT company Autograph and is on the board of trustees for the Paley Center for Media. She also served on the board of American entertainment company Anonymous Content.

Ostroff joined Paramount Global’s board of directors in May 2023 as an independent, non-executive director. She stepped down from the position in 2024.

In February 2024, it was announced that Ostroff joined Mattel Corporate’s Board of Directors.

== Awards and recognition ==
- Hollywood Reporter 2021 Women in Entertainment Power 100 (2021)
- New York Women in Communications Matrix Award (2021)
- Billboard Power List (2020)
- Rolling Stone The Future 25 (2019)
- New York Women in Film & Television MUSE Award (2014)
- AdAge Women to Watch (2012)

== Personal life ==
Ostroff resides in New York City with her husband Mark Ostroff and their four children.
