= Ian Hultquist =

American composer and musician (born 1985)

- Born: October 31, 1985 (age 39)
- Origin: San Diego, U.S.
- Genres: Film score
- Occupation: Film composer
- Instrument(s): Keyboard, guitar, synthesizer
- Years active: 2007–present
- Labels: Little Twig Records
- Website: ianhultquist.com

Ian Hultquist is an American composer and musician. Hultquist is best known for his score for The Diabolical and for being a founding member of the band Passion Pit. He is also known for his works on film and television such as Mommy Dead and Dearest, The First Monday in May, My Blind Brother, Memoria and The Walking Dead: Dead City.

== Career ==
After graduating from Berklee College of Music, Hultquist became a founding member of the indie band Passion Pit in 2007 and acted as their music director while on tour. This pulled him away from film composing for a while and in 2010 he and his wife Sofia Hultquist created their side project 'Aislyn'.

In 2013 he was introduced to documentary filmmaker Andrew Rossi who quickly hired him to score his film Ivory Tower. Around the same time, while on set for a Passion Pit music video, Hultquist would also meet and befriend actor David Dastmalchian, who would then hire Hultquist to score his feature film 'Animals'.

From there, Hultquist's composing career burgeoned as he began to compose music for films at SXSW and Sundance. In October 2014, he officially left Passion Pit.

== Personal life ==
Hultquist is married to fellow composer and musician Sofia Hultquist.

== Works and awards ==
Hultquist has composed dozens of soundtracks and film scores for both film and TV. He is best known for scoring The Diabolical and for being a founding member of the band Passion Pit. He is also known for his works on movies such as Mommy Dead and Dearest, The First Monday in May, My Blind Brother and Memoria. He also composed score for Apple TV+'s Dickinson with Drum & Lace, as well for the AMC series The Walking Dead: Dead City.

== Discography ==
- Silicon Cowboys (Original Motion Picture Soundtrack) (2016)
- The First Monday in May (Original Motion Picture Soundtrack) (2016)
- Love & Bananas: An Elephant Story (Original Motion Picture Soundtrack) (2018)
- The Gospel According to André (Original Motion Picture Soundtrack) (2018)
- Assassination Nation (Original Motion Picture Soundtrack) (2019)
- I Know What You Did Last Summer (Music From the Amazon Original Series) (2021)
- Die in a Gunfight (Original Motion Picture Soundtrack) (2021)
- The Walking Dead: Dead City (Original Television Series Soundtrack) (2023)
