= Jacob Wohl =

American far-right conspiracy theorist, fraudster and convicted felon

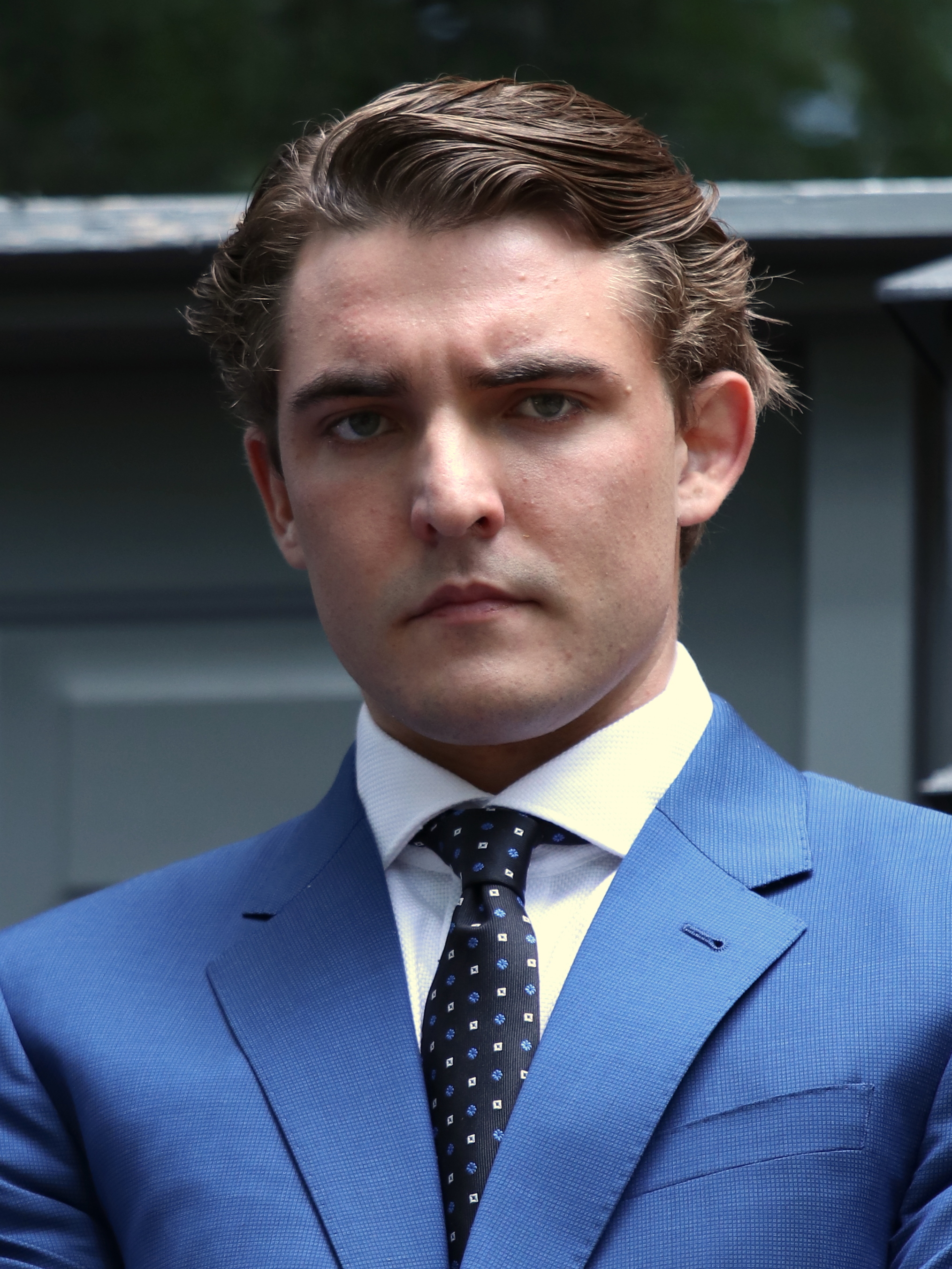
- Wohl in 2020
- Born: Jacob Alexander Wohl; December 12, 1997 (age 28); Los Angeles, California, U.S.
- Known for: False claims against political figures
- Criminal information
- Convictions: Telecommunications fraud (2022); Illicit sales of securities (2024)
- Penalty: Fine, probation, and community service

Jacob Alexander Wohl (born December 12, 1997) is an American far-right conspiracy theorist, fraudster, convicted felon, and lobbyist. Wohl and fellow lobbyist Jack Burkman have been responsible for multiple unsuccessful plots to frame public figures for fictitious sexual assaults. The pair were allegedly behind plots in October 2018 against US Special Counsel Robert Mueller, in April 2019 against 2020 Democratic presidential candidate Pete Buttigieg, and in April 2020 against White House Coronavirus Task Force member Anthony Fauci.

Wohl has created and promulgated other false or unfounded claims and conspiracy theories, mainly against Democratic Party politicians such as Joe Biden, Hillary Clinton, Kamala Harris, Ilhan Omar, and Elizabeth Warren. To aid his schemes, Wohl has created multiple fake private intelligence agencies, and has fabricated death threats and protests against himself. Formerly highly active on Twitter, and known for his online trolling on social media, Wohl has been banned from Twitter, Facebook, and Instagram for creating fake accounts in violation of site policies.

In August 2020, Wohl and Burkman made tens of thousands of robocalls to residents of battleground states, in a campaign that prosecutors alleged intentionally targeted non-white communities to spread disinformation in an attempt to suppress voting in the 2020 presidential election. As a result of the campaign, Wohl and Burkman each pleaded guilty to one felony charge of telecommunications fraud in Ohio, pleaded no contest to four felony counts in Michigan, and were found to have violated federal and state civil rights laws in a civil case in New York. In June 2023, the Federal Communications Commission imposed a fine of more than $5 million against both Wohl and Burkman over the robocall scheme.

Wohl founded several investment funds as a teenager. The National Futures Association banned Wohl for life in 2017, after investigating multiple investor complaints against him and concluding that Wohl was guilty of refusing to cooperate with the NFA as required, misrepresenting investments, and misleading investors. The same year, the Arizona Corporation Commission charged Wohl with 14 counts of securities fraud and ordered him to pay approximately $35,000 in restitution and penalties. In August 2019, Wohl was arrested on felony charges in California for illicit securities sales that took place in July and August 2016. He pleaded guilty to four felony counts, and in 2024 was sentenced to two years of probation.

In 2025, rapper Boosie Badazz paid Wohl and Jack Burkman $600,000 to arrange for a pardon by president Donald Trump. Boosie filed legal action against the two in July 2026 after failing to receive a pardon.

== Early life ==
Jacob Alexander Wohl was born on December 12, 1997. He was raised in a Jewish family in Corona, California, where he attended Santiago High School. While in high school, he founded several investment funds, soliciting investments from classmates and teachers.

Wohl's father, David Wohl, is a defense attorney and conservative commentator who has been a guest on Fox News programs and has also promoted conspiracy theories.

== Activities ==
=== Investment funds, sanctions, and legal action ===
Wohl founded investment funds Wohl Capital Investment Group (WCIG), NeX Capital Management, and Montgomery Assets, Inc. (MAI) as a teenager. Initially, he took investments from classmates and his high school teachers. Wohl appeared on Fox Business in 2015, when he was 17 years old, to discuss his hedge fund. He posted Craigslist ads for "Wohl Girls", models who were hired to help attract clients, and a number of risqué websites including "WohlGirls.com" were registered to his name. One model alleged that Wohl posted photographs of her online without her permission.

In 2016, the National Futures Association (NFA) investigated NeX Capital Management after receiving an investor complaint. The investor said that Wohl had told him his $75,000 investment had grown, but had paid the investor only $44,000 when the investor demanded the money be returned. The man later died by suicide. Wohl claimed that the difference was due to losses, but the NFA found that Wohl's trading accounts "appeared to have made, not lost, money overall". Some of the money, the NFA alleged, had been diverted into Wohl's mother's brokerage accounts. The NFA said Wohl made an unbalanced presentation of profit potential and risk of loss to clients, and had misled investors by claiming to have been trading for 10 years, which would have been since he was eight or nine years old. Wohl hid from NFA investigators when they came to his house, and his father, an attorney, threatened to sue the NFA for harassment. In March 2017, the NFA banned Wohl for life.

A 2016 complaint by the same man resulted in the Riverside Superior Court in Riverside County, California, issuing felony arrest warrants on August 9, 2019, for Wohl and his former business partner, Matthew Johnson, on charges of unlawful sale of securities. The Riverside County District Attorney's Office alleged that Wohl and Johnson violated California law by selling unqualified securities through Montgomery Assets between July 27 and August 27, 2016. In July 2016, an investigator from the district attorney's office contacted Wohl and Johnson, who at the time were running the Montgomery Assets firm, and claimed to represent a client who was interested in investing with them. According to the 2019 arrest warrant, the investigation resulted in an apparent attempt by Wohl and his partner to sell an unregistered security. Wohl was taken into custody on August 19, 2019. He ultimately pleaded guilty to four felony counts, and in 2024 was sentenced to two years of probation.

In 2017, the Arizona Corporation Commission (ACC) issued a cease-and-desist order to Wohl and his three investment funds after it found they were in violation of securities laws. The ACC charged Wohl and his companies with 14 counts of securities fraud, including falsely representing investment risks, misrepresenting the amounts of assets managed, and falsely claiming in online advertisements on Craigslist that he, then 18, and his business partner, then 27, had more than 35 years of experience flipping homes. Wohl at one point claimed that he was managing 178 client accounts and combined total assets under management (AUM) of as much as $10,000,000, although the ACC said that he only had thirteen clients and an AUM of around $500,000. Wohl was ordered by the ACC to pay $32,919 in restitution and $5,000 in penalties. In May 2020, the ACC announced that they were working with the Arizona Attorney General's office in collection efforts against Wohl, who had not made any payments towards the fines.

=== Surefire Intelligence ===
In 2018, Wohl created and registered the company Surefire Intelligence, LLC. Reporters who investigated Surefire Intelligence in October 2018, prompted by an alleged plot to frame Robert Mueller for sexual assault that same month, found that the company had been created by Wohl just a few weeks earlier and that its official phone number redirected to a voicemail inbox for a phone number belonging to Wohl's mother. They also reported that employee photographs on the website were actually photographs of people unrelated to Surefire, including actor Christoph Waltz. News agencies found profiles of supposed Surefire Intelligence employees on the LinkedIn professional networking site which used photographs of unrelated celebrities as profile images; a photograph of Israeli supermodel Bar Refaeli was used on a profile claiming to be the company's Tel Aviv station chief, and a profile for a person named Matthew Cohen used an altered photo of Wohl. A journalist visited the address listed on Surefire Intelligence's website and found it to be the location of an unrelated company.

Soon after creating the company, Wohl advertised it as a team of private investigators on classified ad site Craigslist. In the ad, Wohl falsely claimed that Surefire consisted of former Israeli intelligence agents and various other investigative experts. At least once, Wohl posed as investigator Matthew Cohen to a potential client who responded to the ad. One paid him a $1,200 advance fee for help in recovering her stolen truck, but Wohl never performed any investigative services for the fee, nor did he return the money or contact her again.

Minutes after Michael Avenatti was reported being arrested on suspicion of domestic violence on November 14, 2018, the Surefire Twitter account posted a news story about the arrest, adding, "Surefire Intelligence strikes again". The following day, Avenatti suggested that Wohl was behind the arrest, and tweeted, "First Mueller and now me. When we are fully exonerated I am coming for you Jacob Wohl aka Surefire." Avenatti was ultimately not charged in relation to the reported incident.

=== Kidnapping allegations ===
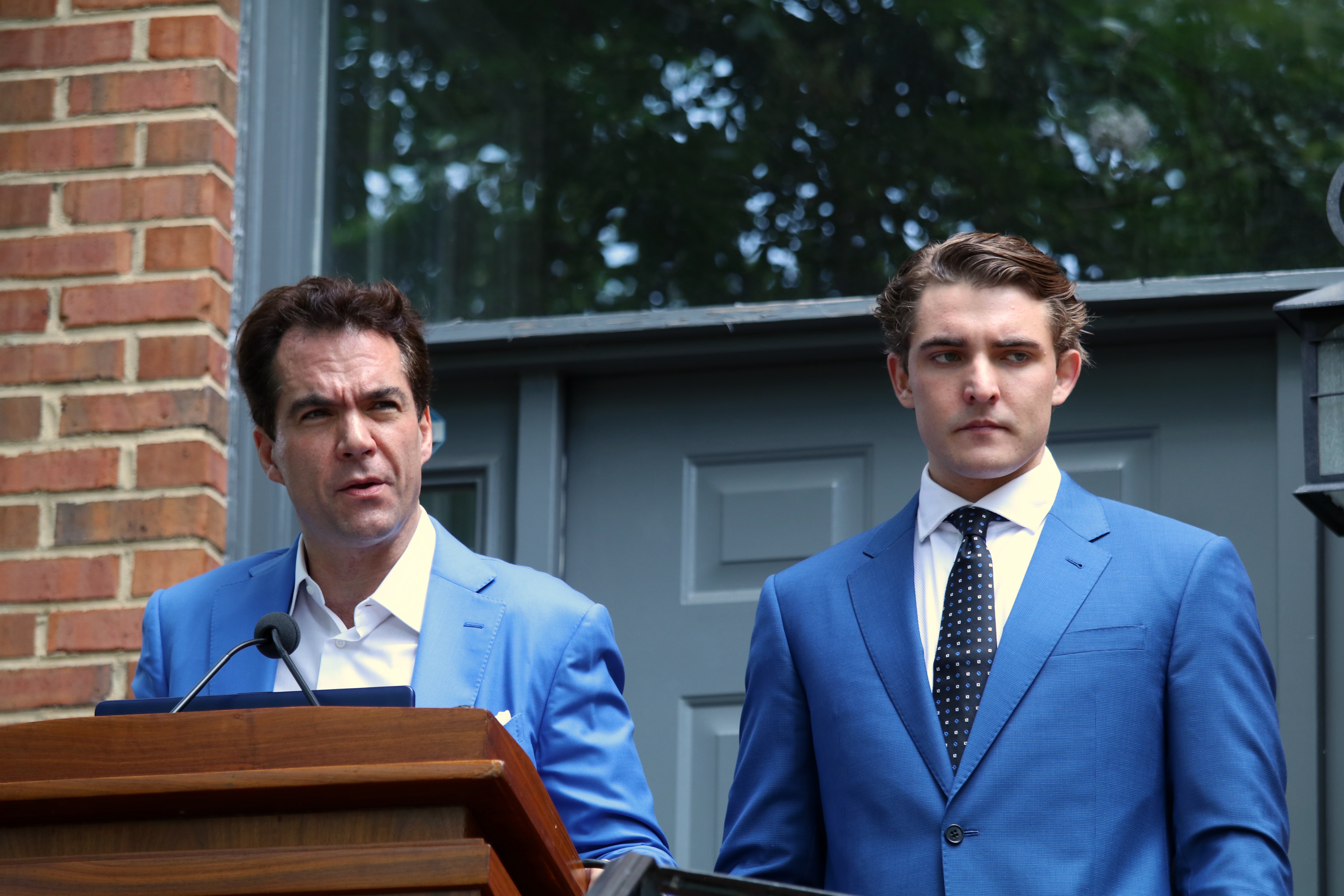
Jacob Wohl and Jack Burkman address kidnapping allegations at a press conference on August 6, 2020.

Merritt Corrigan, deputy White House liaison for the US Agency for International Development (USAID), was fired from her position on August 3, 2020, shortly after unlocking her previously private Twitter account and sending several anti-LGBT tweets. The same day, she announced she would be holding a press conference on August 6 with Wohl and Burkman to expose what she described as "rampant anti-Christian sentiment" at USAID. A press release from Wohl and Burkman claimed that Wohl had "been working behind the scenes with Corrigan for months".

On the afternoon of August 4, Corrigan deleted her tweets from the previous day. Wohl claimed that Corrigan was being convinced by associates of President Donald Trump to go back on her claims against the USAID, and Burkman said that Corrigan had "buyer's remorse" for sending the tweets. Later that day, Corrigan issued a statement apologizing for her tweets, and alleged: "I did NOT send these messages, and while I vehemently protested about them being sent in my name, my devices were not in my control. I see now that I was part of an abusive scheme and I was used to attack people that have nothing to do with me". She said that she would not be participating in any press conferences, and claimed that "individuals ... forced me to hand over my devices so they could control me and the output in my name".

Wohl released his own statement saying that he was being falsely accused of kidnapping, and that he and Burkman would still be holding the August 6 press conference. He also stated that he and Corrigan had been involved in a romantic and sexual relationship. At the press conference, Wohl and Burkman denied the kidnapping allegations, which they claimed had been fabricated by far-right activist Raheem Kassam, a long-time friend of Corrigan's. Following the press conference, Wohl published a 90-second recording of a conversation between him and Corrigan which he said exonerated him of wrongdoing, though according to journalist Ford Fischer, it "shows Corrigan accusing Wohl of preventing her from having contact with her friends, and Wohl accusing Kassam of creating the situation. Corrigan doesn't appear to say anything corroborating Wohl's account of events".

The events formed the basis for Maximum Truth, a 2023 mockumentary directed by David Stassen.

=== Voter suppression robocall ===
In August 2020, Wohl and Burkman made tens of thousands of robocalls to residents of battleground states, including Michigan, Ohio, and Pennsylvania, and others, including New York and Illinois. The robocall campaign appeared to originate from Burkman's personal cell phone number, and the caller identified themself as part of Wohl and Burkman's organization, Project 1599. The messages disseminated the false claims that information provided by those who use mail-in ballots would be used by police to find criminals, by credit card companies for debt collection purposes, and by the CDC to "track people for mandatory vaccines".

Several lawsuits against Wohl and Burkman alleged that the robocalls were an attempt to suppress votes in the 2020 presidential election, and New York District Judge Victor Marrero wrote in his judgment against them that the men had intentionally targeted Black communities with the calls.

In late 2022, Wohl and Burkman both pleaded guilty to a single felony charge of telecommunications fraud in Ohio, and were sentenced to a fine, probation, and community service. In March 2023, Judge Marrero ruled in the New York civil case that Wohl and Burkman had violated federal and state civil rights laws, and the two agreed to pay a $1 million settlement. In August 2025, Wohl and Burkman both pleaded no contest to four felony charges in Michigan after their appeals to have the charges dismissed were rejected.

On June 6, 2023, the Federal Communications Commission (FCC) imposed a $5,134,500 fine against Wohl and Burkman for the robocalls. At the time it was proposed in August 2021, this was the largest fine ever sought by the commission under the Telephone Consumer Protection Act.

==== Michigan ====
On October 1, 2020, Michigan Attorney General Dana Nessel filed four felony charges each against Wohl and Burkman, including conspiring to intimidate voters in violation of election law. Nessel's investigation into the robocalls found that Wohl and Burkman had attempted to suppress people of color from voting in the 2020 presidential election via a robocall campaign that made 85,000 calls across the country, including 12,000 in Detroit. The week before the charges were filed, investigators searched Wohl's Los Angeles home. In a press release, Michigan Secretary of State Jocelyn Benson and Attorney General Nessel condemned the robocall campaign as "racist" and as "an unconscionable, indefensible, blatant attempt to lie to citizens about their right to vote".

Wohl told the Associated Press that same month that he and Burkman believed "leftist pranksters" had spoofed Burkman's phone number to make the phone calls, and Wohl threatened to sue Benson for defamation; Wohl and Burkman later admitted in court that they were responsible for the calls, but argued that the call was not intended to suppress voting and was rather an exercise of their rights to free speech.

Wohl and Burkman turned themselves in to Detroit police on October 8, 2020, and both pleaded not guilty at a later court appearance. On February 23, 2021, a Michigan circuit court judge denied Wohl and Burkman's motion to dismiss the charges. Wohl and Burkman appealed the decision to the Michigan Court of Appeals, which denied the appeal. After an appeal to the Michigan Supreme Court, the Supreme Court sent the case back to the Court of Appeals to determine whether the state law under which the two were charged violated the First Amendment. The Court of Appeals determined the case could proceed, and the Supreme Court declined to hear a subsequent appeal by Wohl and Burkman to dismiss the charges. On August 1, 2025, the Michigan Attorney General's Office announced that Wohl and Burkman both pleaded no contest to the charges. On December 1, 2025, a Michigan judge sentenced both Wohl and Burkman to one year of probation.

==== New York ====
The National Coalition on Black Civic Participation filed a federal civil suit against Wohl and Burkman in New York on October 16, 2020, alleging that the two men violated the Voting Rights Act and the Ku Klux Klan Act of 1871 by making the robocalls. On October 28, New York District Court Judge Victor Marrero ordered the men to call back the targets of the robocall to tell them the information in their message was false and that the campaign was illegal. The judge also prohibited them from engaging in more robocalls or text message campaigns to attempt to disenfranchise voters. Wohl and Burkman tried multiple times to pause the civil suit while there were active criminal proceedings against them, but Judge Marrero denied the request on February 22, 2021. On May 19, 2021, the judge granted New York Attorney General Letitia James's motion to intervene in the lawsuit. On March 8, 2023, Judge Marrero found that Wohl and Burkman had violated several federal and state civil rights laws, including the Voting Rights Act, the Civil Rights Act of 1957, and the Ku Klux Klan Act. In his opinion, he wrote that "the neighborhoods that Defendants targeted were not accidental or random," and that a reasonable jury would determine they had intended to "deny the right to vote specifically to Black voters." On April 9, 2024, Letitia James announced that Wohl and Burkman agreed to pay $1,000,000 to settle the case.

As a part of the litigation against Wohl and Burkman, in August 2022, the New York Attorney General announced a settlement with Message Communications, Inc., the robocall company that the pair had used, in which the company will pay $50,000 restitution.

==== Ohio ====
In October 2020, prosecutors in Cuyahoga County, Ohio indicted Wohl and Burkman on eight counts of telecommunications fraud and seven counts of bribery. (Note: Bribery in this case is, as according to the Ohio Revised Code, "Attempt by intimidation, coercion, or other unlawful means to induce such delegate or elector to register or refrain from registering or to vote or refrain from voting at a primary, convention, or election for a particular person, question, or issue.") On October 24, 2022, Wohl and Burkman each pleaded guilty to one felony charge of telecommunications fraud. As a part of the plea deal, the 14 other counts of telecommunications fraud and bribery were dropped. On November 29, both Wohl and Burkman were each fined $2,500, sentenced to two years of probation, and ordered to perform 500 hours of community service registering voters in Washington, DC.

=== Pardon brokering ===
During the second presidency of Donald Trump, Wohl worked as a partner at Burkman's J.M. Burkman & Associates lobbying firm, where the two took on clients pursuing presidential pardons. Among their clients was Joseph Schwartz, a nursing home operator convicted of tax evasion in April 2025. Schwartz paid Wohl and Burkman $960,000, although a White House official said that no one at the White House had spoken with either Wohl or Burkman about Schwartz's case. Schwartz terminated their services, and later secured a pardon after enlisting another lobbying firm.

Wohl and Burkman also lobbied for a pardon on behalf of rapper Torrence Ivy Hatch Jr., who performs as Boosie Badazz, who pleaded guilty to firearms possession. Wohl and Burkman claimed that the president had signed a pardon and they were awaiting an announcement, but an assistant US attorney on the case told Hatch's lawyer no pardon was in the system. Wohl and Burkman had also told Hatch that several influential figures, including House Speaker Mike Johnson and MAGA influencers Erika Kirk and Mike Cernovich, had endorsed the pardon; they later told NOTUS they had not. Hatch sought a refund of $300,000, half of what he paid Wohl and Burkman, under a provision of his contract that allowed him to request a partial refund if he was not pardoned. As of July 2026, Wohl and Burkman have refused to refund Hatch, claiming to be "essentially bankrupt" due to fines imposed for their robocall conviction. Hatch has taken the case to arbitration.

In February 2026, Wohl and Burkman disclosed they were lobbying for the Department of Justice to drop charges against Andean Medjedovic or, alternatively, for the President to pardon him. Medjedovic is a Canadian fugitive wanted in both the United States and Canada for allegedly stealing money from two cryptocurrency platforms.

=== Writing and podcasting ===
In February 2018, Wohl created a news blog called The Washington Reporter, which served as a home for his political podcast Offended America. NBC News reported in November 2018 that Wohl had "adopted and amplified nearly every prominent conspiracy theory to arise in the last year," and had used his blog to publish unfounded claims about Hillary Clinton, George Soros, and Robert Mueller. In June 2018, The Washington Reporter was found to have completely plagiarized its Code of Ethics from the journalism non-profit ProPublica. By August 2018, the website was offline and Wohl had stopped releasing podcast episodes.

Wohl also co-hosted a podcast for Jewish Trump supporters with fellow far-right activist and conspiracy theorist Laura Loomer.

Wohl was hired as a writer for the far-right website The Gateway Pundit in June 2018, before being fired later that year as a result of his failed plot against Mueller.

=== Other activities ===
Wohl became increasingly politically active as Donald Trump launched his 2016 campaign for the presidency. Wohl established a reputation for his vociferous support for Trump on Twitter, and his speed in replying to nearly all of Trump's tweets.

In 2019, Wohl and Burkman announced they would investigate any rumors about candidates in the 2020 presidential election. Any candidates they fully vetted, they said, would receive the "Burkman-Wohl Seal of Approval".

During the COVID-19 pandemic in 2020, Wohl began selling a physical fitness program on his website. In April 2020, Wohl announced he had begun operating an account on OnlyFans, a subscription-based social media platform.

The Washington Post reported that agents from the Federal Bureau of Investigation (FBI) had executed a raid on Jack Burkman's home on the morning of September 14, 2020. Wohl claimed that the agents had taken "all of Jack's files, computers and phones" from the home, which was also the headquarters of Wohl and Burkman's organization, Project 1599. By the afternoon of the same day, The Washington Post had updated their story to reflect that the raid had been staged, and they retracted the story shortly after. The Daily Beast discovered that Wohl and Burkman had again recruited actors on Craigslist to stage the raid, under the guise of recording a television show. The Daily Beast also reported that the Twitter account which published the photos of the raid was likely operated by Wohl.

Wohl and Burkman collaborated to produce Predator DC, a YouTube series styled after the To Catch a Predator reality television series, which they promised would expose politically powerful sexual predators in Washington, DC. Employees later accused the pair of failing to take proper safety precautions and not paying promised salaries. In 2024, an attorney sued Wohl and Burkman after he was fired from his law firm and professorship, alleging that the two had ruined his reputation by falsely accusing him of being a predator. The case was dismissed for jurisdictional reasons and failure to establish a RICO claim. In 2025, a former DC elementary school teacher sued Wohl and Burkman, saying he lost his job after being falsely accused in the show.

In September 2024, Politico reported that Wohl and Burkman had been running a firm called LobbyMatic, which promised to apply artificial intelligence to lobbying. According to the report, the duo hid their true identities, using false names and other fabricated personas to run the company. Wohl used the name "Jay Klein", and Burkman was known as "Bill Sanders" to Lobbymatic employees. LobbyMatic also claimed to have as clients several major US companies that denied ever using the firm's services.

In July 2026, SecurityWeek reported that Wohl and Jack Burkman managed IRIS C2, an offensive cybersecurity company operating through Virginia-based Calvexa Group LLC. The company advertised payments for zero-day vulnerabilities and claimed to provide phone-hacking services to the U.S. government.

== Attempts to frame public figures ==
=== Robert Mueller ===
On October 22, 2018, Vermont Law School professor Jennifer Taub received an email from Wohl's firm, Surefire Intelligence, asking her to tell them about her "past encounters" with US Special Counsel Robert Mueller and offering her money to discuss Mueller by phone. Taub stated she had never met Mueller and referred the matter to Mueller's office, which then referred the matter to the Federal Bureau of Investigation (FBI).

On October 30, NBC News and The Atlantic published articles detailing a scheme to falsely accuse Mueller of sexual misconduct. The articles reported that on October 17, 2018, several journalists received emails from a person claiming to be named Lorraine Parsons, who asserted that conservative lobbyist Jack Burkman had hired Wohl's Surefire Intelligence firm to offer her more than $20,000 to sign an affidavit falsely accusing Mueller of sexual misconduct and workplace harassment. Parsons told the reporters she had worked with Mueller at the law firm Pillsbury, Madison & Sutro in 1974, and that the man from Surefire had asked her to falsely accuse Mueller of engaging in misconduct during that time. Mueller worked at Pillsbury in 1974, but the firm told reporters they had no record of any Lorraine Parsons ever working there. Parsons declined reporters' requests to speak on the phone, and none of the reporters published the story until the scheme became evident.

On October 30, Wohl tweeted, "Several media sources tell me that a scandalous story about Mueller is breaking tomorrow. Should be interesting. Stay tuned!" Burkman tweeted that he and Wohl would hold a press conference two days later to "reveal the first of Special Counsel Robert Mueller's sex assault victims". The Gateway Pundit, which employed Wohl, published the Lorraine Parsons allegations on October 30, including claims that there were "exclusive documents" about a "very credible witness" to support the accusations against Mueller. Each document had in its header the phrase "International Private Intelligence," the business slogan of Surefire Intelligence. The article was removed later that day, with owner Jim Hoft stating that the matter and "serious allegations against Jacob Wohl" would be investigated. The following day, Hoft shared a tweet by Wohl that suggested Mueller's office was actually behind the scheme. Also that day, Burkman and Wohl posted a tweet claiming that Parsons did not exist, denying involvement in the matter, and calling it "a hoax designed to distract the nation from [Burkman's] press conference" to be held the next day.

Wohl and Burkman convened a press conference outside Washington, DC on November 1, ostensibly to present a woman who they said signed the affidavit previously published by The Gateway Pundit, accusing Mueller of raping her in a New York hotel room in 2010 – on a date he was contemporaneously reported by The Washington Post to be serving jury duty in Washington. The men accused Mueller's office of "leaking" the eight-year-old Post story to discredit their allegations.

The purported accuser, Carolyne Cass, did not appear at the press conference as they had initially stated she would, and the men asserted she had panicked and taken a flight to another location. Towards the end of the press conference, one reporter heckled, "Are you both prepared for federal prison?", to which Burkman replied "No we are not". Soon after the press conference, Hoft announced that The Gateway Pundit had "suspended [their] relationship" with Wohl.

On February 26, 2019, USA Today published an article about Wohl in which they interviewed Cass. She had initially contacted Wohl, who was then posing as an investigator named Matthew Cohen on Craigslist, in hopes that he would help her recover some stolen money. Wohl did no work to recover the money, and instead offered Cass a position at Surefire Intelligence. Speaking of the document accusing Mueller produced by Wohl and his associates, she said that "they had made it up" with a fabricated signature of hers and that they had "needed a credible female to put on the line".

In April 2019, the FBI declined a Freedom of Information Act (FOIA) request for documents relating to Surefire Intelligence, explaining that "Acknowledging the existence or non-existence of records could reasonably be expected to interfere with law enforcement proceedings", citing FOIA exemption (b)(7)(A). Reporter Colin Kalmbacher commented in Law & Crime that this is a common denial by law enforcement agencies, which suggested that an active FBI criminal probe against Wohl was underway.

The attempt to frame Mueller was included as a case study in After Truth: Disinformation and the Cost of Fake News, a television documentary directed by Andrew Rossi that aired on HBO on March 19, 2020.

=== Pete Buttigieg ===
On April 22, 2019, Jack Burkman tweeted, "2020 is shaping up to be more exciting than 2016. Looking like it will be Trump vs. Mayor Pete! Get the popcorn ready!" A Medium post emerged on April 28, published under the name of a gay Republican college student, alleging that Pete Buttigieg had sexually assaulted him in February. At the time, Buttigieg was the mayor of South Bend, Indiana and a Democratic presidential candidate for 2020. David Wohl, Jacob's father, shared an article on Twitter about the post, published by far-right website Big League Politics. A Twitter account created a month prior under the student's name also emerged. The next day, The Daily Beast reported that Wohl and Jack Burkman had tried to convince several young Republican men to make false accusations of sexual assault against Buttigieg. One man attested that Wohl and Burkman had tried to convince him to falsely accuse Buttigieg of sexually assaulting him when he was too drunk to consent. According to the anonymous source, Wohl and Burkman contacted him under the false identities "Bill" and "Matt Teller", but when they met in person the man recognized Wohl due to Wohl's Internet notoriety and decided to secretly record their conversation. He then provided the recording to The Daily Beast, which wrote that it corroborated the man's claims, citing an audio forensics analyst who determined that one man in the recording was "highly likely" to be Wohl. The source said that he did not agree at the time to participate in the scheme, and that Wohl phoned him shortly after to ask he recommend friends who would. The phone number allegedly used by Wohl was discovered to have been listed on the website of "Potomac Intelligence Group", where the company described itself as a private intelligence firm and listed Matt Teller as an employee, along with a link to Teller's LinkedIn profile. Minutes after Wohl was contacted by The Daily Beast, the website and the LinkedIn page were taken down, and the phone number was disconnected. In addition to Potomac Intelligence, Wohl was later linked to at least four other fake intelligence firms. The student who was being impersonated on Medium and Twitter told The Daily Beast that Wohl and Burkman flew him to Washington, DC under the guise of speaking about politics from the perspective of a gay Republican, and that he was unaware they were trying to involve him in their scheme. He said they had created the Medium profile and a Twitter profile claiming to be him without his permission.

Wohl and Burkman announced that they would be holding a press conference at Burkman's house on May 8 to continue their accusations against Buttigieg. On May 7, Burkman tweeted a link to an event called "Protest Against Homophobic Bigots" and wrote, "Hundreds of leftist protestors are set to descend on our Wednesday Press conference. We WILL NOT surrender to the mob. We've called in extra security to guard our safety and that of our partners in the media". The protest was discovered to be fake, organized by Wohl himself, when attendees received confirmation emails containing the email ID "wohlthinktank", which Wohl had used in the past. Mediaite noted that events can be registered with false contact information on Eventbrite, but that Eventbrite would have emailed the address used by the organizer, allowing them to delete or edit the event. Wohl denied involvement in creating the event page, and Eventbrite later took down the event page, citing their rules against "inauthentic content".

At the May 8 press conference, Wohl and Burkman displayed footage of the student they had flown to Washington, DC drinking a coffee, which they said was proof that the student was not being coerced. Wohl stated, "Most forced coercion events ... do not involve caramel frappuccino". While the press conference was underway, the student released his own statement describing Wohl and Burkman as "chronic liars" and stating that he would not be at the press conference as they had claimed. No protesters attended the fake protest that Wohl had attempted to organize.

Wohl and Burkman later threatened to sue The Daily Beast, which had broken the news that the claims were false, for $500 million. As of August 2020, no lawsuit had been filed.

=== Elizabeth Warren ===
On October 3, 2019, Wohl and Burkman held a press conference alleging that Elizabeth Warren, US Senator from Massachusetts and then-2020 presidential candidate, had engaged in an extramarital affair with a 24-year-old former US Marine. They alleged that Warren hired the man from a website called "Cowboys4Angels", described as "a site for attractive young men who provide companionship escort services to well-heeled women", in August 2018 in Massachusetts.

Wohl, Burkman, and Warren's accuser appeared at the press conference next to a television displaying a graphic that read, "Elizabeth Warren Cougar?" They claimed that Warren had hired the man to engage in BDSM with her and told him that she was in an open relationship with her husband. The accuser also showed a supposed "sex scar", which was later debunked when it was discovered he had previously posted on social media a picture of the same scar and stated that he had "hit [his] back with a chain trying to take down a swing".

The conference was met with mockery and disbelief in the media, and the claim was widely assumed to be another of Wohl and Burkman's false allegations. Posting on Twitter, NBC News reporter Ben Collins joked: "Congrats to Elizabeth Warren on rising so quickly in the polls she forced Jacob Wohl to write erotica about her". Warren herself joked about the baseless allegations indirectly, including "go Cougars" in a tweet about college debt – a reference both to the mascot of her alma mater, the University of Houston, and to the slang term for women who pursue younger men which Wohl and Burkman had used for her.

=== Kamala Harris ===
On October 9, 2019, Wohl and Burkman held a press conference in which they alleged the US Senator from California and then-2020 presidential candidate Kamala Harris had engaged in an extramarital affair. They were joined by a man who alleged that he had been Harris's personal trainer and that she had paid him thousands of dollars for sex. During the press conference, a man approached Wohl and Burkman and handed them papers, which the two claimed were a cease and desist letter from Harris's campaign. They refused to allow journalists to see the document, first claiming they had disposed of it and later claiming they would release it after their lawyers reviewed it. The Daily Beast wrote that the cease and desist was "apparently fake". Wohl and Burkman also claimed they had text messages between the accuser and Harris, but declined to allow reporters to see them. Newsweek later wrote that they were unable to find any record that the accuser was a personal trainer, and also found discrepancies in the spelling of the accuser's name.

It was later discovered that the accuser was an actor who had responded to a Craigslist ad, which requested a male actor for "performance art". The man was unaware that Harris was a real person, and said that he was led to believe everyone at the press conference, including journalists and hecklers, were also paid actors. He said that Wohl had told him that he was a director, and that they were filming a show for Spike TV (a channel which, as of October 2019, had been shut down for a year). The man, whose real name was attached to the allegations, said that after the conference he started to receive accusations that he was a liar via social media, and that he became scared to go outside.

=== Anthony Fauci ===
In late April 2020, a press release was published in which a woman claimed to have been sexually assaulted in 2014 by Dr. Anthony Fauci, a prominent member of the White House Coronavirus Task Force. Only The Daily Dot reported on the allegation, to debunk it as a likely smear attempt. On May 2, 2020, the woman told Reason magazine that she and another woman had been paid by Wohl and Burkman to fabricate allegations against Fauci. She said that she knew Wohl from several years ago when they were romantically involved, and that he had encouraged her to frame Fauci, using the details of a real sexual assault which she had experienced, which she had divulged to Wohl when they were dating. She claimed that Wohl had previously paid her to use the story of her assault to frame an Academy Award-winning actor, but the story gained no traction, and so he had her reuse it to attempt to frame Fauci.

According to Reason, the woman recorded a phone call with Wohl and Burkman when she decided to expose the scheme. In the recording, Wohl responded to the woman's concerns over the ramifications of the accusation by saying, "Look, can you just do this for me? Can you just keep your mouth shut and just ... just do it for me". The two men also asked her "[who cares if you] made up a story. Grow up, for Christ's sake" and claimed that she "readily volunteered" to make the false accusation. The recording reportedly captured Wohl telling the woman: "You did a good job, you got paid. What's the problem? What seems to be the issue?"

== Other false and unfounded claims ==
=== "Hipster coffee shop" ===
Jacob Wohl
(@JacobAWohl)
tweeted:

I just left a hipster coffee shop in downtown LA. There was a group of young Democrats murmuring to each other that they know the "Suspicious Packages" were an inside job to make Republicans look bad

October 24, 2018

After Wohl made a popular tweet that he had "just left a hipster coffee shop" where he overheard "libs" praising President Donald Trump's interactions with Vladimir Putin at the 2018 Russia–United States Summit in Helsinki, other tweets by Wohl were uncovered that repeated the same phrase, alongside claims that he had overheard groups of customers including liberals, Democrats, and Jewish people voicing support for Trump or opposition to his political opponents.

These repeated events in similar locations were viewed to be improbable, and the tweets were mocked in an online meme in which people followed the phrase "just left a hipster coffee shop" with unlikely fictional scenarios. Wohl later admitted that he had fabricated the conversations which he claimed to have overheard.

=== Kamala Harris ===
On January 22, 2019, Wohl falsely claimed on Twitter that Democratic Senator and then-presidential candidate Kamala Harris was not a US citizen on account of her parents not being naturalized citizens at the time of her birth, and as such, was ineligible to be president. Harris was born in Oakland, California, and is therefore a US citizen regardless of her parents' citizenship status at the time. PolitiFact rated Wohl's claim "Pants on Fire". (Note: PolitiFact ranks the truthfulness of statements in six categories ranging from "true" to "pants on fire". A "pants on fire" statement is one that "is not accurate and makes a ridiculous claim".)

In February 2019, Wohl used a fake Twitter account that claimed to represent a group of women who supported Starbucks CEO Howard Schultz's possible 2020 presidential campaign, in order to write that Kamala Harris "does not represent American Women" and that she "traded sexual favors for public office".

=== Representative Ilhan Omar and Minneapolis ===
In February 2019, Wohl traveled to Minnesota with far-right conspiracy theorist Laura Loomer, claiming to investigate rumors that Ilhan Omar, US Representative for Minnesota's 5th congressional district and a Somali American, had married her brother to grant him US citizenship. Their trip was organized and attended by Ali Alexander, also a far-right activist and conspiracy theorist. Wohl created an online fundraising campaign to try to raise $25,000 to fund the trip. In a subsequent series of tweets and livestreams, Wohl claimed that Minneapolis had "no-go zones" containing "Somali jihadists", that a local Somali man had threatened to kill him, that "Islamicist forces have taken over sections of [Minnesota's] police departments", and that he had to wear body armor and travel with hired security in armored cars to avoid hitmen. The security team, however, did not appear in any of their livestreams, and Wohl declined livestream watchers' requests to film the armored cars and security team which he claimed to have hired. Star Tribune columnist Jennifer Brooks wrote that the group "cast lie after lie after lie into the wind" and that "for every minute they spent lying about conditions in Minnesota, they spent at least four begging for donations for their cause". Pat Garofalo, a Republican state representative from Minnesota, refuted Wohl's claim about "no-go zones" in a tweet, calling it "a lie" and "a farce".

Wohl appeared on the grounds of the 2019 Conservative Political Action Conference (CPAC) with Jack Burkman, ostensibly to present evidence from their trip, but was ejected. Vox debunked Wohl's conspiracy theory as "largely nonsensical", writing that there is no evidence that Ahmed Elmi, Omar's ex-husband whom Wohl claimed to be her brother, was related to Omar in any way; that US law permits a citizen to petition citizenship for their siblings, which would have voided the need for a marriage had they been siblings; and that Elmi, a British citizen, has never received US citizenship. Mother Jones wrote that Wohl's claims are "far into tinfoil-hat territory".

In mid-March 2019, Wohl, Loomer, and Alexander released a documentary about their investigation into Omar in which they claimed that they have secured proof that she had married her brother. In the video, Wohl is shown filing a police report in a Minneapolis police station about death threats he claimed to have received while they were in the city. However, the Twitter account shown sending threats via direct message in the video, supposedly belonging to a person working as a diversity coordinator in Minneapolis, was one of the fake Twitter accounts Wohl had been operating himself. After news reports about Wohl's faked death threats, Alexander attempted to distance himself from Wohl. The Daily Dot noted that Wohl might have filmed himself committing the crime of filing a false police report. On March 15, 2019, a Minnesota man sued Wohl for stealing his Instagram photo and using it as the profile picture for the fake account. The man hired Michael Avenatti for the case, who announced that he would "pursue all available criminal and civil claims against Jacob Wohl. It is time that he face the consequences for his outrageous conduct. And I intend on ensuring that he does".

=== Roger Stone jury ===
In late February 2020, Wohl and Burkman alleged that the jury that convicted Roger Stone on seven felonies related to Robert Mueller's Special Counsel investigation had been biased against him. In a press conference held on February 27, 2020, Wohl and Burkman distributed copies of confidential juror questionnaires, and they later published some of the questionnaires on Twitter. In September 2020, The Daily Beast reported that the FBI was investigating Wohl and Burkman for potentially attempting to influence the jurors or tamper with witnesses, and was investigating how the two obtained the questionnaires.

=== Other false claims ===
On February 6, 2019, Colin Campbell, an editor of The News & Observer, tweeted photos that showed two white students in Ku Klux Klan robes holding a noose around the neck of another white student wearing blackface. The photos were from the 1979 yearbook page for the Chi Phi fraternity of the University of North Carolina at Chapel Hill. Roy Cooper, the incumbent Governor of North Carolina, graduated that year from that university with membership to a different fraternity, Chi Psi. Later that day, The Daily Mail published a story with the misleading headline "Blackface lynch pics from Roy Cooper North Carolina yearbook", although the article clarified that there was no evidence that Cooper was in any of the photos. The next day, Wohl tweeted "BREAKING: Racist picture of Democrat North Carolina Governor Roy Cooper emerges just days after he called on Ralph Northam to resign - Daily Mail", but did not include any link to Daily Mail articles. Wohl did not respond to an inquiry from PolitiFact. PolitiFact rated Wohl's tweet "Pants on Fire".

On October 1, 2019, Wohl and Jack Burkman held a press conference on the front steps of Burkman's home in which they claimed to know the identity of the whistleblower who revealed possible impropriety by President Trump involving Ukraine, though they said they could not release the whistleblower's name. The press conference was sparsely attended and described by The Washington Post as another in a series of events in which Wohl and Burkman "routinely announce they have discovered smoking-gun revelations against Trump's rivals, then humiliate themselves when they fail to produce any evidence".

During the May 2019 press conference in which Wohl and Burkman falsely accused Buttigieg of sexual assault, the pair also shared an unsubstantiated rumor that Joe Biden might have Parkinson's disease. In March 2020, Wohl published fake COVID-19 test results, claiming that Democratic presidential candidate Joe Biden had COVID-19 and would die in 30 days.

== Bans from social media ==
Wohl has been described as an Internet troll for his activities on social media. He was active on Twitter, which he used to spread lies and misleading information about Democratic politicians and post in support of Trump. In a February 26, 2019, interview with USA Today, Wohl said that he planned to create fake left-wing accounts to try to direct votes towards Democrats who would make weaker opponents for Trump in the 2020 presidential election. Wohl also stated that he sought to solicit "damaging information" against left-leaning nonprofits such as the Southern Poverty Law Center, Media Matters for America, and Right Wing Watch by providing insiders money or "moral reconciliation".

On the same day as the USA Today article was published, Twitter permanently banned Wohl after an investigation found that he had already broken the site's rules against creating fake accounts. One account found to be operated by Wohl was that of the supposed Minneapolis diversity coordinator that Wohl had reported to police for making death threats against him. Another was @Women_4_Schultz, which purported to be a group of women supporting billionaire and former Starbucks CEO Howard Schultz's possible 2020 presidential campaign. When contacted by USA Today after the ban was placed, Wohl stated that he had created the accounts for his businesses and "future think tank", but maintained that he had "not created fake accounts or bot armies or anything like that". In a February 26 interview with NBC News, he said, "In my entire adult life, I've had three Twitter accounts," indicating his @JacobAWohl account, his intelligence company's Twitter account, and his think tank account. In the same interview, he first denied but later admitted to operating the @Women_4_Schultz account. Wohl said that the veracity of the information he disseminates is not important, and that the spread of the claims and the number of people believing them was what was what mattered. He further said that he believed truth to be an outdated concept, stating that "It's something that can't be thought about in a linear, binary true-false, facts-non-facts – you can't do that anymore ... It's just not the way it works". He defended his attempt to manipulate elections, stating, "It is not illegal, unethical, or untoward for Americans to steer an American election". Without providing any evidence, he claimed antisemitism was behind his Twitter suspension, and that it was retribution for his purported "investigation" of Representative Ilhan Omar.

Wohl was banned from both Instagram and Facebook on August 31, 2020. According to the latter platform, the ban was to enforce their rules that disallow "coordinated inauthentic behavior", which they alleged Wohl had violated by creating fake accounts in advance of the November 2020 election. Writing on Telegram about the ban, Wohl said, "Now that I've been banned by Facebook, Twitter, LinkedIn and Instagram, I no longer have any reservations about using their platforms to 'manipulate the conversation,' as they put it. Project 1599 will make Cambridge Analytica look like a middle school science fair project".

== Personal life ==
In 2022, Wohl lived in Irvine, California. Wohl is Jewish.
