= Carlo Amato =

Italian aristocrat and businessman (1938–2021)

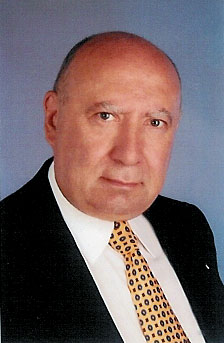
- Born: Carlo Camillo Amato Chiaramonte Bordonaro; August 29, 1938; Rome, Italy
- Died: October 20, 2021 (aged 83); Miami, Florida, United States

Carlo Camillo Amato Chiaramonte Bordonaro (August 29, 1938 – October 20, 2021), more commonly known as Baron Carlo Amato, was an Italian-born aristocrat and businessman who lived in both Canada and the United States.

Amato was known for Shangri-La, a 600-acre summer estate located on Roberts Island in Nova Scotia, where visiting chef Sirio Maccioni is said to have invented the dish pasta primavera.

Amato served as Ambassador of the Sovereign Military Hospitaller Order of Saint John of Jerusalem, of Rhodes and of Malta to the countries of Saint Vincent and the Grenadines and Saint Lucia and was also an investor in the development of the Caribbean island of Canouan.

== History ==
Amato was born in Rome, Italy, to Baron Giuseppe Amato Chiaramonte Bordonaro and Countess Fernanda Giannini Paolini. His grandfather was senator from Sicily.

Amato first arrived in America in 1959 and that same year he and his wife, Lorraine Manville Amato, purchased a 600-acre plot of land on Roberts Island, Nova Scotia. Known as Shangri-La, Amato built a mansion on the estate in 1965 that served as his summer residence. The estate also featured a hedge maze, a domed pool and multiple guest homes.

Amato introduced wild boars to the island and invited guests to hunt them on 75 acres of his property. The animals were imported from the Black Forest in Germany and Amato told The New York Times in 1976 that his family had a history of raising wild boars. At one time he had upwards of 200 boar on his property and he documented his experiences in the 1981 book The Wild Boar: History, Husbandry, the Hunt: A complete study of Sus Scrofa while serving as an assistant professor at Georgia State University. Amato also sold the meat to restaurants in Montreal and New York City.

The Amatos would often invite high-profile chefs to stay at their estate in order to experiment with dishes featuring wild boar, as well as local seafood and produce. During a visit to Shangri-La in 1975, restaurateur Sirio Maccioni, owner of Le Cirque, is said to have invented the dish pasta primavera, which he brought back with him to his New York restaurant. Other guests of the estate included Italian actresses Gina Lollobrigida and Sophia Loren, American zoologist Jim Fowler, as well as various government officials, entrepreneurs and members of royalty.

Amato became a Canadian citizen in 1970 and lived part-time in Miami, Florida.

In the 1990s, Amato and a group of fellow investors leased 1500 unoccupied acres on the island of Canouan in the Grenadines and built the Tamarind Beach Hotel, with plans to develop a complex of apartments and villas, a marina and a golf course. He also served as Ambassador of the Sovereign Military Hospitaller Order of Saint John of Jerusalem, of Rhodes and of Malta to the countries of Saint Vincent and the Grenadines and Saint Lucia from 1983 until his death.

== Private life ==
Amato was married to Lorraine Manville, whose family made its fortune from asbestos via the Johns Manville corporation. Manville died in Nova Scotia in 1998.

Amato married Irela Fabiola Lopez Fonseca, an artist and textile designer, in 2003.

== Death ==
In 2020 it was reported that Amato was in poor health and was living exclusively in Miami. He died in Coconut Grove on October 20, 2021, after a long illness.
