= Roberts Island, Nova Scotia =

Community in Nova Scotia, Canada

Coordinates: 43°47′3.68″N 65°53′13.45″W

Roberts Island, in Nova Scotia

Roberts Island is a community in the Canadian province of Nova Scotia, located in the Yarmouth Municipal District of Yarmouth County.

== History ==
The island was called Île La Tour by Acadians, after Charles de Saint-Étienne de la Tour who had a trading post in this area. A settlement on the island prior to the Acadian Expulsion was also known as "Ouikmakagan".

The island is said to be the birthplace of the American dish pasta primavera. In 1975, New York restaurateur Sirio Maccioni, then owner of the French restaurant Le Cirque, was visiting an estate on Roberts Island known as Shangri-La. The estate was owned by Italian Baron Carlo Amato and his American wife, Lorraine Manville, who hosted several high profile visitors at Shangri-La, including Italian actresses Gina Lollobrigida and Sophia Loren. The 600-acre estate featured a 270-acre mansion, wild boar hunting, a hedge maze, a domed pool and multiple guest homes.

== Nature conservation ==
In 2016, the Nature Conservancy of Canada acquired a 20-hectare site located on the west side of Lobster Bay, in which Roberts Island is situated. About 20 percent of the site contains salt marshes that are inhabited year-round by American black ducks and are frequented seasonally by long-tailed ducks and green-winged teals. The area serves as a home to white tailed deer, woodpeckers, songbirds, common goldeneye, surf scoters and geese.

The endangered Eastern baccharis plant found within the Lobster Bay region is not found anywhere else in Canada and is more commonly found along the warmer East Coast of the United States. At the time of the acquisition by the Nature Conservancy of Canada, approximately 3,000 to 3,200 of these plants were thought to exist within the bay, 20 to 30 of which were found in the protected area of Roberts Island. The forested area of the property also contains black and white spruce trees, as well as balsam fir.
