= Jack Burkman =

American lobbyist, convicted felon

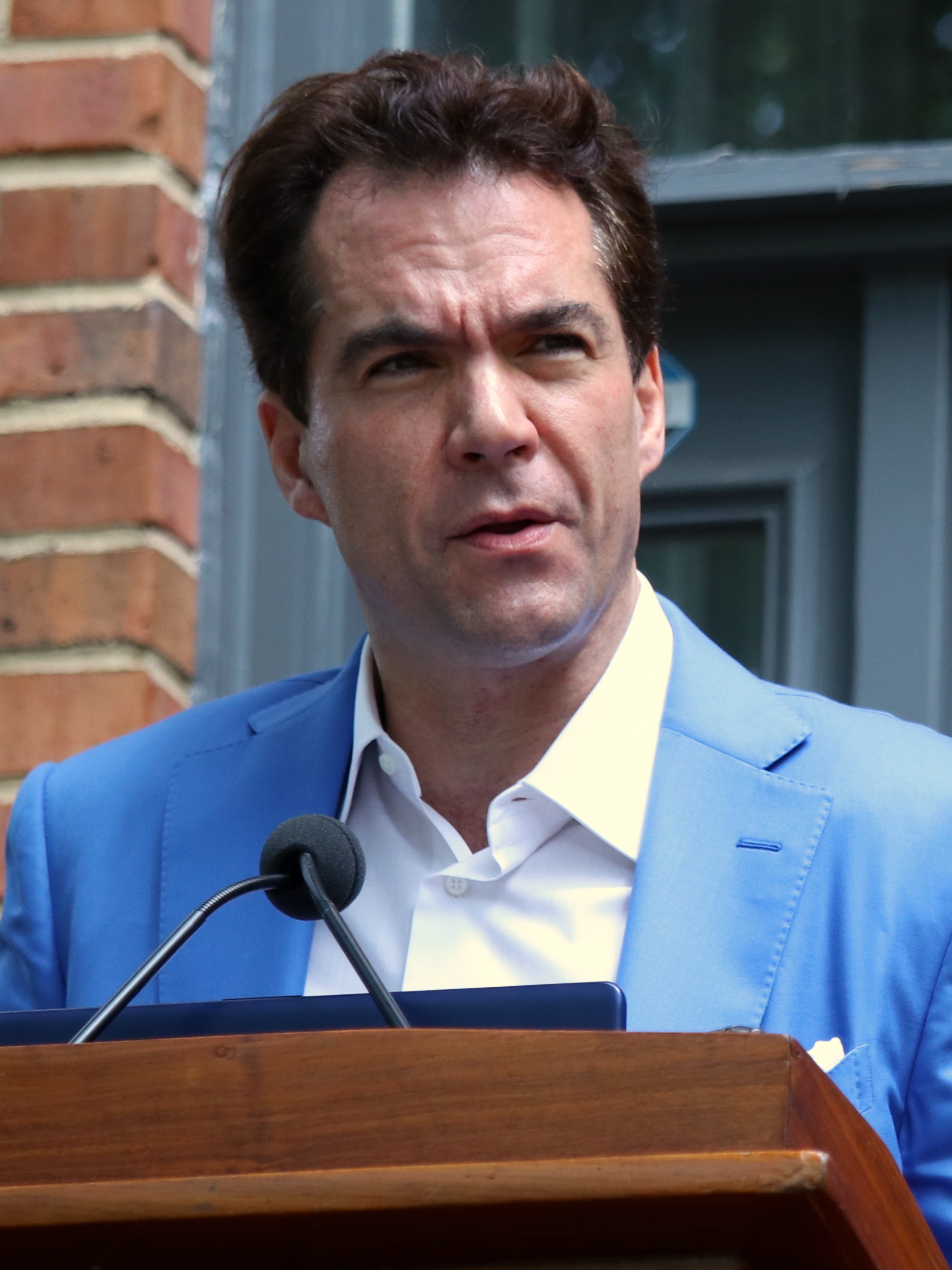
- Jack Burkman in August 2020
- Born: John Macauley Burkman Jr. 1965 or 1966 (age 60–61); Pittsburgh, Pennsylvania, US
- Education: University of Pittsburgh (BA); Georgetown University (MS, JD)
- Occupation: Lobbyist
- Known for: False claims against political figures
- Political party: Republican
- Criminal information
- Criminal charge: Telecommunications fraud
- Penalty: Fine, probation, and community service

John Macauley Burkman Jr. (born 1965 or 1966) is an American conspiracy theorist, fraudster, convicted felon and conservative lobbyist. Burkman and far-right conspiracy theorist Jacob Wohl have allegedly been responsible for multiple unsuccessful plots to frame public figures for fictitious sexual assaults, including in October 2018 against US Special Counsel Robert Mueller, in April 2019 against 2020 Democratic presidential candidate Pete Buttigieg, and in April 2020 against White House Coronavirus Task Force member Anthony Fauci.

In August 2020, Burkman and Wohl made tens of thousands of robocalls to residents of battleground states, in a campaign that prosecutors have alleged intentionally targeted communities of color to spread disinformation in an attempt to suppress voting in the 2020 presidential election. As a result of the campaign, Burkman and Wohl each pleaded guilty to one felony charge of telecommunications fraud in Ohio, were found to have violated federal and state civil rights laws in a civil case in New York, and are facing criminal charges in Michigan. In June 2023, the Federal Communications Commission imposed a fine of more than $5 million against both Burkman and Wohl over the robocall scheme.

Burkman was also involved in spreading conspiracy theories about the 2016 murder of Seth Rich, and in 2017 Burkman was shot in the buttocks and thigh and hit with a car by a man he had hired to assist him in an independent attempt to solve Rich's murder. Burkman drew significant media attention in 2014 for organizing a protest against the Dallas Cowboys of the NFL after the team signed Michael Sam, an openly gay football player, to its practice squad.

Burkman is the president of the lobbying firm J.M. Burkman & Associates and the head of the conservative organization American Decency. (Note: Burkman's American Decency group is a separate entity from the American Decency Association.) He was the host of the Behind the Curtain podcast and radio talk show.

== Life and education ==
Burkman was born in Pittsburgh, Pennsylvania. He earned a bachelor's degree from the University of Pittsburgh in 1988, and in 1992 graduated with a MS from the Georgetown University School of Foreign Service and a JD from Georgetown University Law Center. Burkman lives in Arlington, Virginia, in a home that doubles as the headquarters of his and Wohl's organization, Project 1599.

== Attempts to frame political figures ==
=== Robert Mueller ===
On October 22, 2018, Vermont Law School professor Jennifer Taub received an email from Surefire Intelligence, a company created by Jacob Wohl, asking her to tell them about her "past encounters" with US Special Counsel Robert Mueller and offering her money to discuss Mueller by phone. Taub stated she had never met Mueller and referred the matter to Mueller's office, which then referred the matter to the Federal Bureau of Investigation (FBI).

On October 30, NBC News and The Atlantic published articles detailing a scheme to falsely accuse Mueller of sexual misconduct in 1974. The articles reported that on October 17, 2018, several journalists received emails from a person claiming to be named "Lorraine Parsons" that asserted Burkman had hired a man with Wohl's Surefire Intelligence firm to offer her more than $20,000 to sign an affidavit falsely accusing Mueller of sexual misconduct and workplace harassment. Parsons told the reporters she had worked with Mueller at the law firm Pillsbury, Madison & Sutro in 1974, and that the man from Surefire had asked her to falsely accuse Mueller of engaging in misconduct during that time. Mueller worked at Pillsbury in 1974, but the firm told reporters it had no record of any Lorraine Parsons ever working there. Parsons declined reporters' requests to speak on the phone, and none of the reporters published the story until the scheme became evident.

Also on October 30, Burkman tweeted that he and Wohl would hold a press conference two days later to "reveal the first of Special Counsel Robert Mueller's sex assault victims". He told The Daily Beast they were going to "prove that [Mueller] is a drunk and a sexual abuser". The Gateway Pundit, which employed Wohl, published the "Lorraine Parsons" allegations that same day, including claims that there were "exclusive documents" about a "very credible witness" to support the accusations against Mueller. Each document had in its header the phrase "International Private Intelligence," the business slogan of Wohl's Surefire Intelligence firm. The article was removed later that day, with owner Jim Hoft stating that the matter and "serious allegations against Jacob Wohl" would be investigated.

The following day, Hoft retweeted a tweet by Wohl that suggested Mueller's office was actually behind the scheme. Also that day, Burkman tweeted and Wohl retweeted that Parsons did not exist, denying involvement in the matter, and calling it "a hoax designed to distract the nation from [Burkman's] press conference" to be held the next day.

Burkman and Wohl convened a press conference outside Washington, D.C., on November 1, ostensibly to present a woman who they said signed the affidavit previously published by The Gateway Pundit, accusing Mueller of raping her in a New York hotel room in 2010 – on a date he was contemporaneously reported by The Washington Post to be serving jury duty in Washington. The men accused Mueller's office of "leaking" the eight-year-old Post story to discredit their allegations. The purported accuser, Carolyne Cass, did not appear at the press conference as they had initially stated she would, and the men asserted she had panicked in fear for her life and taken a flight to another location. Towards the end of the press conference, one reporter heckled, "Are you both prepared for federal prison?", to which Burkman replied "No we are not". Soon after the press conference, Hoft announced that The Gateway Pundit had "suspended [their] relationship" with Wohl.

On February 26, 2019, USA Today published an article about Wohl in which they interviewed Cass. She had initially contacted Wohl, who was then posing as an investigator named Matthew Cohen on Craiglist, in hopes that he would help her recover some stolen money. Wohl did no work to recover the money, and instead offered Cass a position at his "intelligence" firm. Speaking of the document accusing Mueller produced by Wohl and his associates, she said that "they had made it up" with a fabricated signature of hers and that they "needed a credible female to put on the line".

The attempt to frame Mueller was included as a case study in After Truth: Disinformation and the Cost of Fake News, a television documentary directed by Andrew Rossi that aired on HBO on March 19, 2020. In an interview for the documentary, Burkman said, "I would use Fake News as a weapon, because it's out there. The Germans used chemical weapons, the British used chemical weapons. What are you going to do? It doesn't mean you like chemical weapons, it means you do what you have to do... Yeah, there are terrible negative potential consequences, but so what? That's what I say. So what?"

=== Pete Buttigieg ===
On April 22, 2019, Jack Burkman tweeted "2020 is shaping up to be more exciting than 2016. Looking like it will be Trump vs. Mayor Pete! Get the popcorn ready!"

On April 28, a Medium post emerged under the name of a gay Republican college student, alleging that Pete Buttigieg, mayor of South Bend, Indiana and a 2020 Democratic presidential candidate, had sexually assaulted him in February. A Twitter account created just a month prior under the student's name also emerged. The next day, The Daily Beast reported that Burkman and Jacob Wohl had tried to convince young Republican men to make false accusations of sexual assault against Buttigieg. One man attested that Burkman and Wohl had tried to convince him to falsely accuse Buttigieg of assaulting him when he was too drunk to consent. According to the source, Burkman and Wohl contacted him under the false identities "Matt Teller" and "Bill", but he recognized Wohl due to Wohl's internet notoriety and decided to record their conversation. He then provided the recording to The Daily Beast, which wrote that it corroborated the man's claims with the aid of an audio forensics analyst who determined that one man in the recording was "highly likely" to be Wohl.

The student who was being impersonated on Medium and Twitter told The Daily Beast that Burkman and Wohl flew him to Washington, D.C., under the guise of speaking about politics from the perspective of a gay Republican, and that he was unaware they were trying to involve him in their scheme. He said that he had to pretend that he was taking a nap in order to escape Burkman's residence, and that they had created the Medium profile and a Twitter profile claiming to be him without his permission.

Burkman and Wohl announced that they would be holding a press conference at Burkman's house on May 8 to continue their accusations against Buttigieg. On May 7, Burkman tweeted a link to an event called "Protest Against Homophobic Bigots" and wrote, "Hundreds of leftist protestors are set to descend on our Wednesday Press conference. We WILL NOT surrender to the mob. We've called in extra security to guard our safety and that of our partners in the media". The protest was discovered to be fake, organized by Wohl himself, when attendees received confirmation emails containing the email address Wohl had used in the past. Mediaite noted that events may be registered with false contact information, but that Eventbrite would have emailed the address used by the organizer allowing them to delete or edit the event. However, Wohl denied involvement in creating the event page. Eventbrite later took down the event page citing their rules against "inauthentic content".

At the May 8 press conference, Burkman and Wohl displayed footage of the student they had flown to Washington, D.C., drinking a coffee as proof that the student was not being coerced, with Wohl explaining that "Most forced coercion events… do not involve caramel frappuccino". During the press conference, the student released a statement describing Burkman and Wohl as "chronic liars" and stating that he would not be at the press conference as they had claimed. No protesters appeared at the fake protest of the press conference that Wohl himself had attempted to organize.

=== Anthony Fauci ===
In a late April 2020 press release, a woman claimed to have been sexually assaulted in 2014 by Dr. Anthony Fauci, a prominent member of the White House Coronavirus Task Force. Only The Daily Dot reported on the allegation, debunking it as a likely smear attempt. On May 2, 2020, the woman contacted Reason Magazine to confess that she and another woman had been paid by Burkman and Wohl to fabricate the allegations against Fauci. According to Reason, the woman contacted Burkman and Wohl and recorded their phone conversation. In that call, Wohl told her, "You did a good job, you got paid. What's the problem?" Burkman suggested that Fauci deserved the smear: "This guy shut the country down. He put 40 million people out of work. In a situation like that, you have to make up whatever you have to make up to stop that train and that's the way life works, OK? That's the way it goes... Mother Nature has to clean the barn every so often. How real is it? Who knows? So what if 1 percent of the population goes? So what if you lose 400,000 people? Two hundred thousand were elderly, the other 200,000 are the bottom of society. You got to clean out the barn. If it's real, it's a positive thing, for God's sake".

=== Others ===
On October 1, 2019, Burkman and Jacob Wohl held a press conference on the front steps of Burkman's home in which they claimed to know the identity of the whistleblower who revealed possible impropriety by then-President Trump involving Ukraine, though they said they could not release it. The press conference was sparsely attended and described by The Washington Post as another in a series of events in which Burkman and Wohl "routinely announce they have discovered smoking-gun revelations against Trump's rivals, then humiliate themselves when they fail to produce any evidence".

On October 3, 2019, Burkman and Wohl announced a press conference in which they said a 24-year-old former United States Marine would claim he had an affair with Senator and 2020 presidential candidate Elizabeth Warren; the announcement was met with mockery and disbelief, and generally viewed as another of Burkman and Wohl's false allegations.

On Friday, October 11, 2019, Burkman announced via Twitter that he and Wohl had scheduled a news conference for Monday, October 14. The press release stated that a purported illegal drug dealer would be presented, who would provide evidence that he sold illicit drugs to Speaker of the US House of Representatives Nancy Pelosi, House Intelligence Committee Chairman Adam Schiff, and other unnamed members of Congress. At the press conference, which was postponed until October 21, Burkman and Wohl unexpectedly focused on claims that Senator Ted Cruz was cheating on his wife Heidi, only briefly mentioning their previous claims about Pelosi, and not producing any alleged drug dealer as they had announced they would.

Burkman claimed in January 2020 to have incriminating photographs of Adam Schiff engaged in sexual activity, a statement that earned Burkman attention among adherents to the far-right QAnon conspiracy theory who already believed that Schiff had been engaged in nefarious activity at the Standard Hotel in Los Angeles. The Daily Beast wrote that Burkman unsuccessfully attempted to launder the photographs through several publications before releasing them himself. However, the three photographs eventually published by Burkman were blurry pornographic images "featuring a completely unrecognizable middle-age white man engaged in various gay sex acts". A reverse image search revealed the photographs were generic pornography found via internet search. This angered Burkman's newfound fanbase among QAnon conspiracy theorists, some of whom alleged that Burkman himself was a "deep state" actor working on Schiff's behalf to obfuscate the truth.

== Other activities ==
In June 2016, Burkman held an event called Lobbyists for Trump and invited all major lobbyists of Washington, D.C., to help raise money for Donald Trump's presidential campaign. In July 2016, he helped fundraise for Free the Delegates, an anti-Trump effort to change the delegate rules for the 2016 Republican National Convention.

In October 2019, Burkman and Wohl announced they would investigate any rumors about candidates in the 2020 presidential election as a part of an effort they called "Project 1599". Any candidates they fully vetted, they said, would receive the "Burkman-Wohl Seal of Approval".

On March 19, 2020, Twitter permanently suspended Burkman's account after he tweeted unevidenced claims about impending nationwide food shortages due to the COVID-19 pandemic. A Twitter spokesperson said the account had been suspended for repeated infractions of Twitter rules, including making false statements about COVID-19.

In September 2024, Politico reported that Burkman and Wohl had been running a firm called LobbyMatic, which promised to apply artificial intelligence to lobbying. According to the report, the duo hid their true identities, using false names and other fabricated personas to run the company. Wohl went by the pseudonym "Jay Klein" while Burkman was known as "Bill Sanders".

In September 2024, Burkman claimed on Twitter that he had taken on the role of acting campaign manager for Mark Robinson's gubernatorial campaign. However, Robinson quickly denied this in his own tweet, stating that "Online rumors of new hires to our campaign are just that—rumors."

=== Pardon brokering ===
During the second presidency of Donald Trump, via J.M. Burkman & Associates, Burkman and Wohl took on clients pursuing presidential pardons. Among their clients was Joseph Schwartz, a nursing home operator convicted of tax evasion in April 2025. Schwartz paid Burkman's firm $960,000, although a White House official said that no one at the White House had spoken with either Burkman or Wohl about Schwartz's case, and Schwartz terminated their services. Schwartz later secured a pardon after enlisting another lobbying firm.

Burkman and Wohl also lobbied for a pardon on behalf of rapper Torrence Ivy Hatch Jr., who performs as Boosie Badazz, who pleaded guilty to firearms possession. Burkman and Wohl claimed that the president had signed a pardon and they were awaiting an announcement, but an assistant US attorney on the case told Hatch's lawyer no pardon was in the system. Burkman and Wohl had also told Hatch that several influential figures, including House Speaker Mike Johnson and MAGA influencers Erika Kirk and Mike Cernovich, had endorsed the pardon; they later told NOTUS they had not. Hatch sought a refund of $300,000, half of what he paid Burkman and Wohl, under a provision of his contract that allowed him to request a partial refund if he was not pardoned. As of July 2026, Burkman and Wohl have refused to refund Hatch, claiming to be "essentially bankrupt" due to fines imposed for their robocall conviction. Hatch has taken the case to arbitration.

In February 2026, Burkman and Wohl disclosed they were lobbying for the Department of Justice to drop charges against Andean Medjedovic or, alternatively, for the President to pardon him. Medjedovic is a Canadian fugitive wanted in both the United States and Canada for allegedly stealing money from two cryptocurrency platforms.

=== American Decency ===
Burkman heads the organization American Decency, a conservative organization that claims to have 3.62 million members, though this claim is unverified. The organization drew media attention in 2014 when Burkman announced plans to protest the Dallas Cowboys' signing of Michael Sam, the first publicly gay player to be drafted in the NFL. Burkman called for legislation that would prohibit homosexuals from playing in the NFL, though this proposed legislation was never formally introduced in the House of Representatives and never received a vote.

=== Seth Rich murder conspiracy theory ===
Burkman started investigating the murder of Seth Rich in September 2016 after the Rich family accepted his pro bono public relations services. The Rich family and Burkman held a joint press conference about the murder in November 2016.

In January 2017, Burkman launched an advertising campaign in Northwest D.C. searching for information regarding Rich's death. This included billboard advertisements and canvassing with flyers. In late February, Burkman started spreading conspiracy theories by telling media outlets that he had a lead that the Russian government was involved in Rich's death, and the Rich family distanced itself from Burkman. In March 2017, Burkman started "The Profiling Project", an independent investigative attempt to solve the murder of Seth Rich with help from forensics students at George Washington University. He hired Kevin Doherty, a former US Marine and special agent, to help with the project, although tensions developed when Burkman felt Doherty was speaking to reporters when he shouldn't have been and trying to take control of the project. In July 2017, Burkman fired Doherty and sent him a cease and desist letter. In March 2018, Doherty lured Burkman to a parking garage by claiming to have evidence of FBI misconduct.

When Burkman arrived, Doherty shot him in the buttocks and thigh and hit him with an SUV, breaking Burkman's arm. Doherty was sentenced to nine years in prison.

=== Roger Stone jury ===
In late February 2020, Burkman and Wohl alleged that the jury that convicted Roger Stone, on seven felonies related to the Robert Mueller's Special Counsel investigation, was biased against him. In a press conference held on February 27, 2020, Burkman and Wohl distributed copies of confidential juror questionnaires, and they later published some of the questionnaires on Twitter. In September 2020, The Daily Beast reported that the FBI was investigating Burkman and Wohl for potentially attempting to influence the jurors or tamper with witnesses. The FBI is also investigating how the two obtained the questionnaires.

=== Voter suppression robocall ===
In August 2020, Burkman and Wohl made tens of thousands of robocalls to residents of battleground states, including Michigan, Ohio, and Pennsylvania, and others, including New York and Illinois. The robocall campaign appeared to originate from Burkman's personal cell phone number, and the caller identified themself as part of Burkman and Wohl's organization, Project 1599. The messages disseminated the false claims that information provided by those who use mail-in ballots will be used by police to find criminals, by credit card companies for debt collection purposes, and by the CDC to "track people for mandatory vaccines". Several lawsuits against Burkman and Wohl have alleged that the robocalls were an attempt to suppress votes in the 2020 presidential election, and the Attorneys General of Michigan and New York have alleged that the two men intentionally targeted Black communities with the calls.

On October 24, 2022, Wohl pleaded guilty to a single felony count of telecommunications fraud for having placed thousands of false robocalls in the state of Ohio. On November 29, both Wohl and Burkman were each fined $2,500, sentenced to two years of probation, and ordered to perform 500 hours of community service registering voters in Washington, D.C.

On June 6, 2023, the Federal Communications Commission (FCC) imposed a $5,134,500 fine against Burkman and Wohl for the robocalls. At the time it was proposed in August 2021, this was the largest fine ever sought by the commission under the Telephone Consumer Protection Act.

Michigan
On October 1, 2020, Michigan Attorney General Dana Nessel filed four felony charges each against Burkman and Wohl, including conspiring to intimidate voters in violation of election law. Nessel's investigation into the robocalls found that Burkman and Wohl had attempted to suppress people of color from voting in the 2020 presidential election via a robocall campaign that made 85,000 calls across the country, including 12,000 in Detroit. In a press release, Michigan Secretary of State Jocelyn Benson and Attorney General Nessel condemned the robocall campaign as "racist" and as "an unconscionable, indefensible, blatant attempt to lie to citizens about their right to vote".

Wohl told the Associated Press that same month that he and Burkman believed "leftist pranksters" had spoofed Burkman's phone number to make the phone calls, and Wohl threatened to sue Benson for defamation; Burkman and Wohl later admitted in court that they were responsible for the calls, but argued that the call was not intended to suppress voting and was rather an exercise of their rights to free speech.

Burkman and Wohl turned themselves in to Detroit police on October 8, 2020, and both pleaded not guilty at a later court appearance. On February 23, 2021, a Michigan circuit court judge denied Burkman and Wohl's motion to dismiss the charges. Burkman and Wohl appealed the decision to the Michigan Court of Appeals, which denied the appeal. After an appeal to the Michigan Supreme Court, the Supreme Court sent the case back to the Court of Appeals to determine whether the state law under which the two were charged violated the First Amendment. The Court of Appeals determined the case could proceed, and the Supreme Court declined to hear a subsequent appeal by Burkman and Wohl to dismiss the charges. On August 1, 2025, the Michigan Attorney General's Office announced that Burkman and Wohl both pleaded no contest to the charges.

New York
The National Coalition on Black Civic Participation filed a federal civil suit against Burkman and Wohl in New York on October 16, 2020, alleging that the two men violated the Voting Rights Act and the Ku Klux Klan Act of 1871 by making the robocalls. On October 28, New York District Court Judge Victor Marrero ordered the men call back the targets of the robocall to tell them the information in their message was false and that the campaign was illegal. The judge also prohibited them from engaging in more robocalls or text message campaigns to attempt to disenfranchise voters. Burkman and Wohl tried multiple times to pause the civil suit while there were active criminal proceedings against them, but Judge Marrero denied the request on February 22, 2021. On May 19, 2021, the judge granted New York Attorney General Letitia James's motion to intervene in the lawsuit. On March 8, 2023, Judge Marrero found that Burkman and Wohl had violated several federal and state civil rights laws, including the Voting Rights Act, the Civil Rights Act of 1957, and the Ku Klux Klan Act. In his opinion, he wrote that "the neighborhoods that Defendants targeted were not accidental or random," and that a reasonable jury would determine they had intended to "deny the right to vote specifically to Black voters." On April 9, 2024, Letitia James announced that Wohl and Burkman agreed to pay $1,000,000 to settle the case.

As a part of the litigation against Burkman and Wohl, in August 2022, the New York Attorney General announced a settlement with Message Communications, Inc., the robocall company that the pair had used, in which the company will pay $50,000 restitution.

Ohio
In October 2020, prosecutors in Cuyahoga County, Ohio, indicted Burkman and Wohl on eight counts of telecommunications fraud and seven counts of bribery. (Note: Bribery in this case is, as according to the Ohio Revised Code, "Attempt by intimidation, coercion, or other unlawful means to induce such delegate or elector to register or refrain from registering or to vote or refrain from voting at a primary, convention, or election for a particular person, question, or issue.") On October 24, 2022, Burkman and Wohl each pleaded guilty to one felony charge of telecommunications fraud. As a part of the plea deal, the 14 other counts of telecommunications fraud and bribery were dropped. On November 29, both Wohl and Burkman were each fined $2,500, sentenced to two years of probation, and ordered to perform 500 hours of community service registering voters in Washington, D.C. After the guilty plea, the District of Columbia Bar submitted a recommendation to the D.C. Court of Appeals that Burkman be disbarred. Burkman consented to the disbarment.

=== Staged FBI raid ===
The Washington Post reported that agents from the Federal Bureau of Investigation (FBI) had executed a raid on Burkman's home on the morning of September 14, 2020. Wohl claimed that the agents had taken "all of Jack's files, computers and phones" from the home, which is also the headquarters of Burkman and Wohl's organization, Project 1599. By the afternoon of the same day, The Washington Post had updated their story to reflect that the raid had been staged. The Daily Beast discovered that Burkman and Wohl had again recruited actors on Craigslist to stage the raid, under the guise of filming a television show. The Daily Beast also reported that the Twitter account which published the photos of the raid was likely operated by Wohl.

== See also ==
- Timeline of investigations into Trump and Russia (2018)
