= I Love You, Now Die: The Commonwealth V. Michelle Carter =

2019 two-part documentary film, directed by Erin Lee Carr

- Directed by: Erin Lee Carr
- Produced by: Andrew Rossi; Erin Lee Carr; Sara Bernstein; Alison Byrne
- Cinematography: Bryan Sarkinen
- Edited by: Andrew Coffman
- Music by: Ian Hultquist
- Production companies: HBO Documentary Films; Abstract
- Distributed by: HBO
- Release dates: 9 March 2019 (SXSW); 9 July 2019 (United States)
- Running time: 143 minutes
- Country: United States
- Language: English

I Love You, Now Die: The Commonwealth V. Michelle Carter is a 2019 American two-part documentary film, directed and produced by Erin Lee Carr, and based on the death of Conrad Roy. The film had its world premiere at South by Southwest on March 9, 2019. It aired in two parts on July 9 and 10, 2019, on HBO.

== Synopsis ==
=== Part 1: The Prosecution ===
Two teens, Michelle Carter and Conrad Roy, fell in love. While they only met in real life about five times, they shared thousands of text messages over a period of two years. On July 13, 2014, Roy was found dead in his car. His death was found to be a case of carbon-monoxide intoxication, but when investigators discovered the text messages between the two teens, they learned that Carter had encouraged Roy to kill himself. After an investigation, Carter was arrested for involuntary manslaughter.

=== Part 2: The Defense ===
Michelle Carter and her attorneys unsuccessfully try to prove she was not responsible for Roy's death.

== Release ==
The film had its world premiere at South by Southwest on March 9, 2019. The film was released over two nights beginning on July 9, and 10, 2019, on HBO.

== Reception ==
On the review aggregator Rotten Tomatoes, the film holds an approval rating of 97%, based on 29 reviews, with an average rating of 8.53/10. Its critical consensus reads, "Director Erin Lee Carr expertly blends journalistic edge and empathy in I Love You, Now Die to create a concise, compelling, and refreshingly exploitation-free exploration of a complicated crime." Metacritic, which uses a weighted average, assigned the film a score of 80 out of 100, based on 10 critics, indicating "generally favorable" reviews.

Robyn Bahr of The Hollywood Reporter wrote, "Director Erin Lee Carr deftly layers her story with arguments, reveals and twists that will continuously unearth and rebury your opinion on Carter's culpability, even long after the doc's final moments." Daniel D'Addario of the Variety wrote, "Carr, whose breakout film, Mommy Dead and Dearest, dealt with the now-infamous Blanchard family case of Munchausen syndrome by proxy, is swimming in familiar enough waters, and can be credited with treating Carter's story as well as Roy's with equanimity. She doesn't advocate for Carter's exoneration or her conviction, but does build out a story that will convince you Carter's strange and (at times) seemingly indefensible acts might just spawn from a cocktail of social exclusion, psychiatric meds, and identity in the era of celebrity and the social web." Brian Lowry of the CNN wrote, "I Love You, Now Die might be short on definitive answers for these problems [suicide texting], but it raises all the right questions. Whether Carter was treated unfairly, the loud and clear message is that these kind of conversations need to take place before the next death that, rightly or wrongly, gets attributed to texting."
