= Jena Friedman =

American comedian and writer

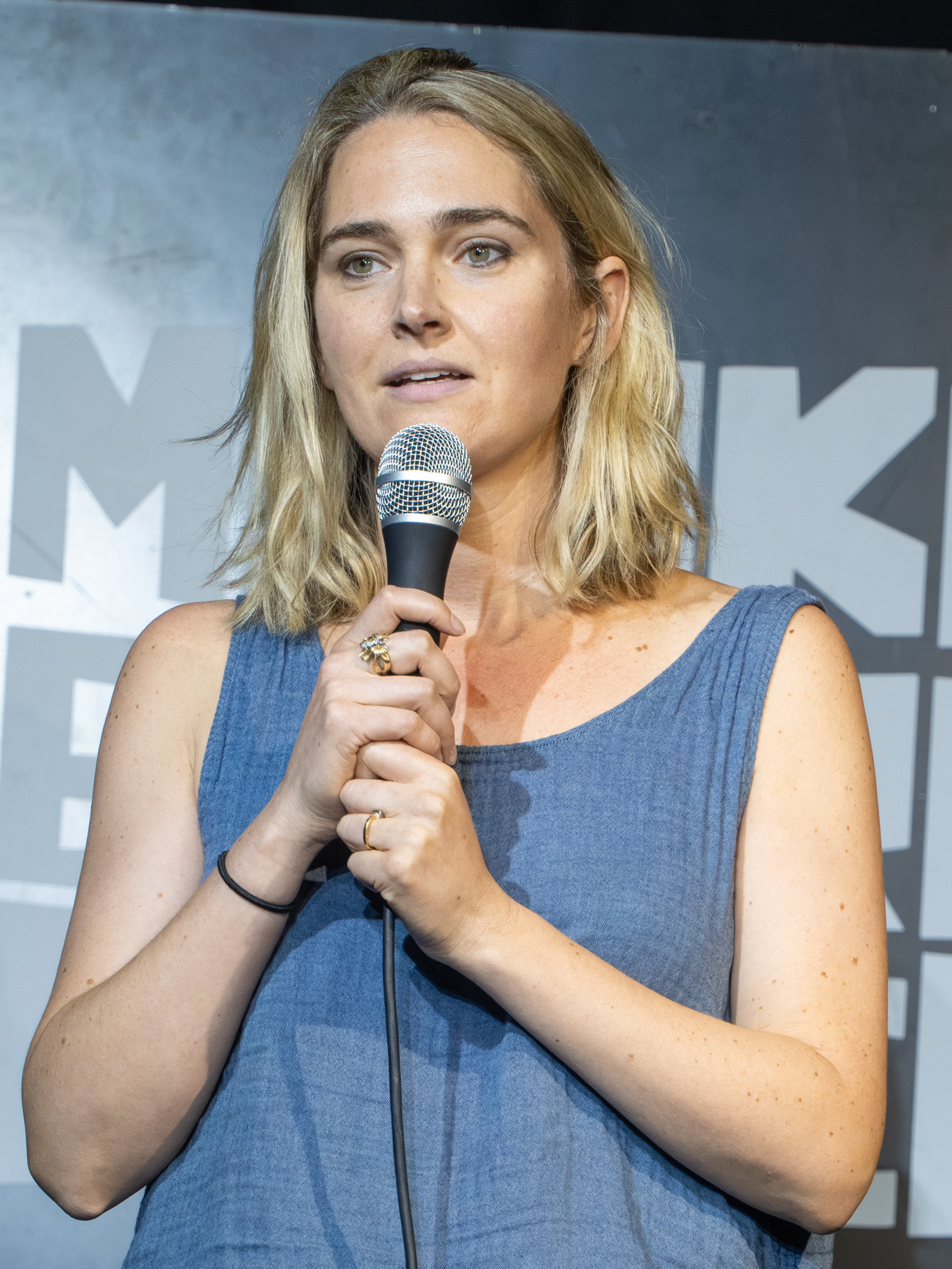
- Friedman at the 2025 Edinburgh Festival Fringe
- Born: January 11, 1983 (age 43); Haddonfield, New Jersey
- Children: One

Comedy career
- Medium: Stand-up, television
- Genre: Dark comedy

Jena Friedman is an American comedian and writer. She is the creator of Soft Focus with Jena Friedman for Adult Swim, the first installment of which premiered in February 2018.

== Early life ==
Friedman was born on January 11, 1983, and raised in a Conservative Jewish home in Haddonfield, New Jersey, where she had a bat mitzvah and went to Hebrew school through 10th Grade, and Haddonfield Memorial High School. She studied anthropology at Northwestern University.

After graduation, she worked as a healthcare consultant for consulting firm Booz Allen Hamilton.

== Career ==
In 2007, Friedman wrote The Refugee Girls Revue, a satire inspired by American Girl dolls. The play earned critical acclaim in the 2008 New York International Fringe Festival and had a successful run Off-Broadway. In 2010, she received a cease-and-desist letter from The New York Times for parodying their wedding videos. The parody, titled Ted and Gracie, has since become a popular web series.

In 2015, Friedman's solo show American Cunt premiered in the Edinburgh Festival Fringe to critical acclaim. The magazine Paste named American Cunt one of the 10 Best Stand Up Comedy Specials of 2016. She created Soft Focus with Jena Friedman, a series of Adult Swim specials that she also co-executive produces, directs, and hosts. The specials include interviews with John McAfee, the American software entrepreneur and Presidential hopeful, as well as Gilberto Valle, a New York City police officer who was convicted of a conspiracy to kidnap, cook, and eat women, known as the "Cannibal Cop". The second installment premiered in January 2019.

She has been a field producer at The Daily Show with Jon Stewart and has written for Late Show with David Letterman.

Friedman appeared in 2020 movie Palm Springs, and on TV shows including Conan, The Late Show with Stephen Colbert, and others. She has also been a contributing writer to The New Yorker.

In 2020, Friedman contributed to the screenplay of Borat Subsequent Moviefilm, with the writing team receiving a nomination for the Academy Award for Best Adapted Screenplay. She directed and starred in True Crime Story: Indefensible on Sundance TV in 2021.

Friedman is the host of the comedic true-crime series Indefensible on AMC+.

Her latest comedy special, Ladykiller, premiered on Peacock in September 2022.

On a May 2023 episode ("EP. 813 — Winkers and Blinkers") of the comedy podcast Comedy Bang! Bang!, Friedman recalled how she was asked to write for the revival of the TV show Roseanne in 2018 after Roseanne Barr had enjoyed a stand-up set by Friedman. On the day she was scheduled to start her new job, Barr went on a racist Twitter rant that resulted in the show being swiftly cancelled.

In April 2025, Friedman gave a TED talk, "The Jokes AI Won't Tell." And in August 2025, Friedman brought her solo show, Motherf*cker to the Edinburgh Fringe Festival.

== Bibliography ==
- Friedman, Jena (December 21, 2020). "Your monthly horoscope". Shouts & Murmurs. The New Yorker. 96 (41): 31. (Note: Title in the online table of contents is "A pandemic horoscope for December".)
- Friedman, Jena (April 18, 2023). Not Funny. Simon & Schuster. ISBN 9781982178284.
