= Pasta primavera =

American pasta dish

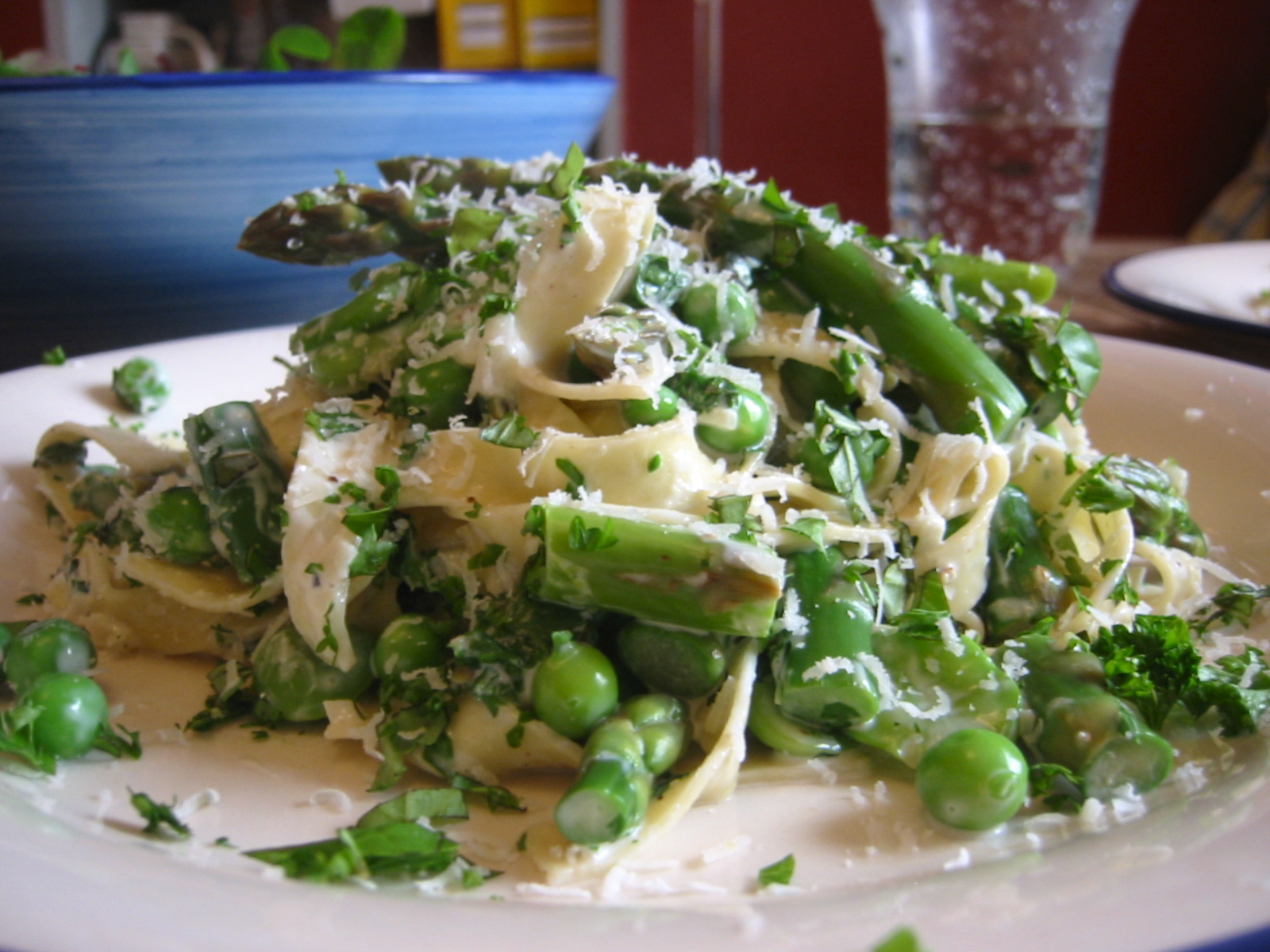
- Place of origin: United States; Canada
- Region or state: Nova Scotia; Yarmouth County
- Invented: 1970s
- Main ingredients: Pasta, vegetables, soffritto (garlic, carrot, celery, olive oil)

Pasta primavera (lit. 'spring pasta') is an Italian-American dish that consists of pasta in a cream sauce and fresh vegetables, invented in the 1970s.

== Origins ==
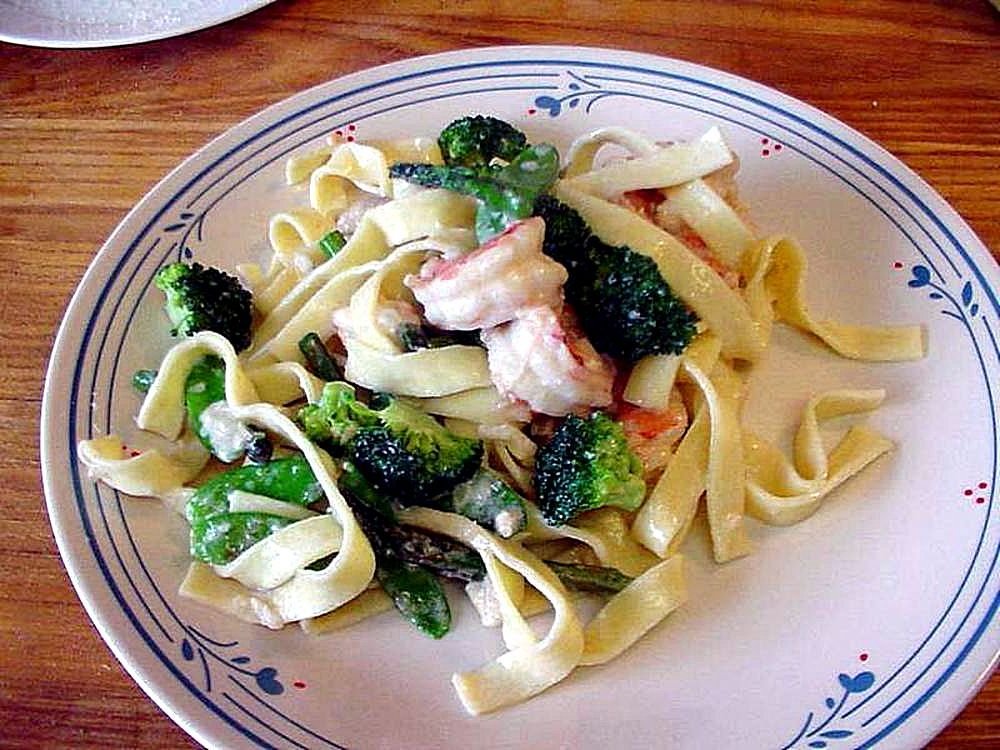
Pasta primavera with shrimp

In 1975, New York restaurateur Sirio Maccioni flew to the Canadian summer home of Italian Baron Carlo Amato, Shangri-La Ranch on Roberts Island, Nova Scotia. Maccioni and his two top chefs began experimenting with game and fish, but eventually the baron and his guests wanted something different. Maccioni then mixed butter, cream and cheese, with vegetables and pasta and brought the recipe back to New York City, U.S.

The fame of pasta primavera traces back to Maccioni's New York City restaurant Le Cirque, where it first appeared as an unlisted special, before it was made famous through a 1977 article in The New York Times by Craig Claiborne and Pierre Franey, which included a recipe for the dish.

The invention of the dish is contested. Le Cirque co-owner Sirio Maccioni claimed that his wife Egidiana threw it together from ingredients on hand during a trip to Nova Scotia. Edward Giobbi, an amateur cook himself, claims to have shown Maccioni and Jean Vergnes, then executive chef at Le Cirque, a similar dish, which Vergnes then slightly modified. Chef Franco Brigandi claims to have invented it while the maitre at Il Gatto Pardo Ristorante in New York City and prepared it for Bob Lape on WABC-TV, before his dish was requested to be cooked by other culinary practitioners.

Maccioni states that Vergnes and his subsequent French chefs refused to allow pasta to be served at Le Cirque, so the many requests for the dish had to be satisfied with a pot set up in a hallway to cook pasta, and plates were finished in the dining room by wait staff away from the chefs' watchful eyes.

The combination of lightly cooked vegetables and pasta, which Claiborne and Franey hailed as "by far, the most talked-about dish in Manhattan", is widely recognized as one of the signature developments of American cuisine in the 1970s.

== See also ==
- List of pasta
- List of pasta dishes
