= Fantasy defense =

Legal defense tactic

The fantasy defense is a legal defense wherein a defendant accused of attempting a crime (enticing minors into sexual activity, for example) claims that they never intended to complete the crime. Instead, they claim they were engaged in a fantasy and, in the case of luring a minor, believed they were dealing with an adult. It is a unique defense that uses the culture of the Internet to defeat the intent portion of a crime.

In 1999, the defense was considered "groundbreaking" when defense attorney, Donald Marks argued that Disney Executive, Patrick Naughton, really didn’t think he was meeting up with a 13-year-old, but rather someone who liked to play one in his trial for child pornography and crossing state lines in an attempt to have sex with a minor. The fantasy defense used in the Naughton case was novel; however, since the closely watched Naughton fantasy defense was successful, defense lawyers were expected to use it to help other clients.

== Notable cases employing this defense ==
- United States v. Valle, aka, the "cannibal cop case"
- United States v. Alkhabaz, aka the "Jake Baker case"
