= 2019 Conservative Political Action Conference =

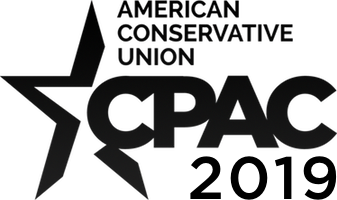
- Date: February 27 – March 2, 2019
- Venue: Gaylord National Resort & Convention Center
- Location: Oxon Hill, Maryland, United States
- Theme: "What Makes America Great"
- Website: cpac.conservative.org

The 2019 Conservative Political Action Conference was the annual event of the Conservative Political Action Conference (CPAC), hosted by the American Conservative Union. It was held at the Gaylord National Resort & Convention Center in Oxon Hill, Maryland, from February 27 to March 2, 2019. The event was headlined by President Donald Trump, with many speakers and panels throughout the conference.

Themes through the conference were fighting against socialism; criminal justice reform; China; and criticizing Alexandria Ocasio-Cortez and the Green New Deal.

== Speakers ==
=== President Donald Trump ===
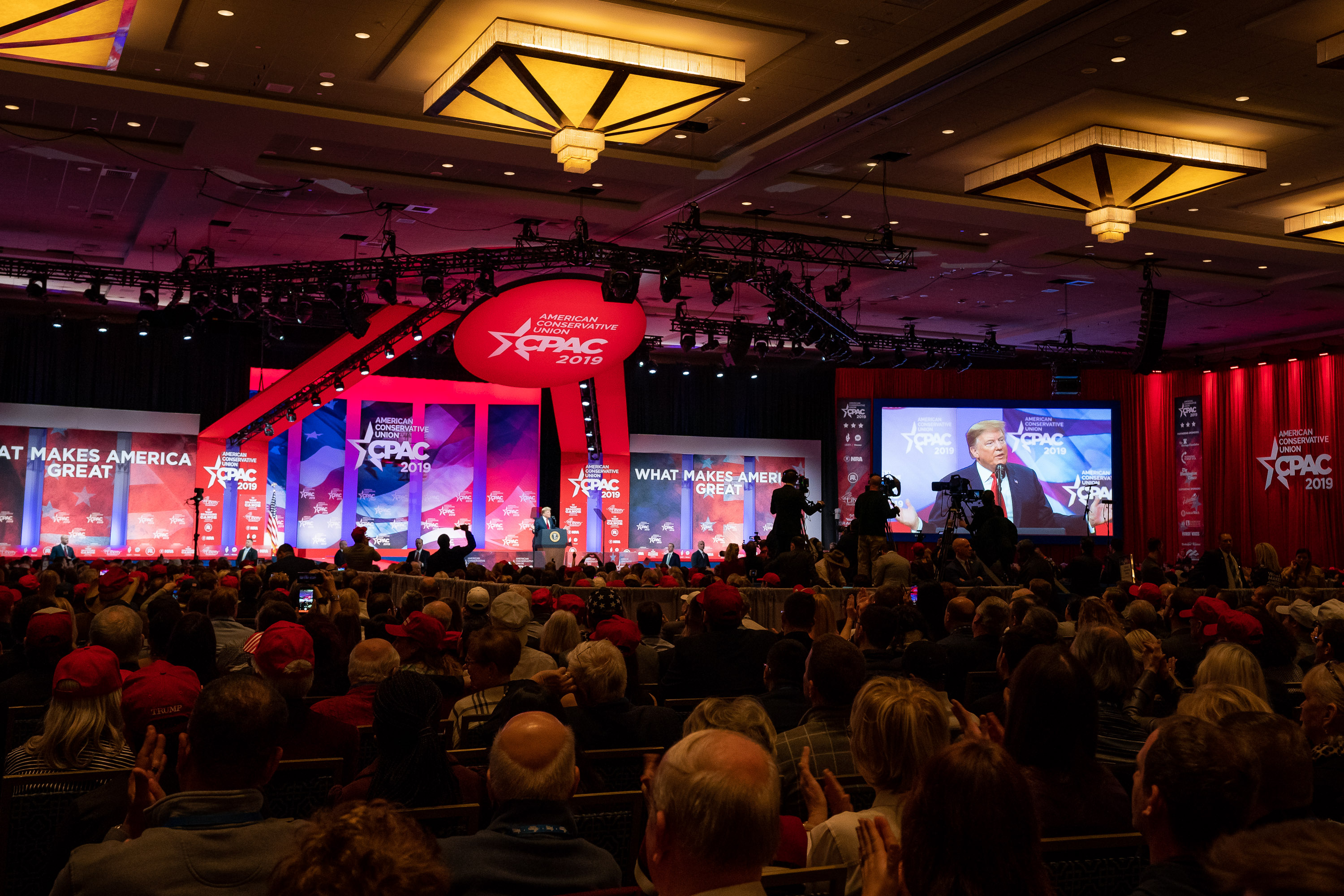
President Trump addressing the conference

President Donald Trump headlined the event, appearing on Saturday, March 2. He spoke for over two hours, which was the longest speech of his presidency to date. Trump criticized many people and topics during the speech, including reporter David Weigel, former FBI Director James Comey, special counsel Robert Mueller, Deputy Attorney General Rod Rosenstein, and attorney general Jeff Sessions, political consultant John Podesta, the Green New Deal, and the Russia investigation, which he called "a phony witch-hunt." During the speech, Trump promised to sign a bill protecting free speech on college campuses and "urged conservative activists to remain vigilant" going into the 2020 elections. Newsweek called the speech "blustery" with "unverifiable statistics", while The New York Times called the speech "rambling." The Week stated the speech contained 104 "false or misleading claims." The Washington Examiner praised the speech, stating the "...speech was a road map for [his] 2020 campaign."

On The Late Show with Stephen Colbert, Stephen Colbert made fun of the fact Trump hugged an American flag while onstage, stating, "He is dry humping Old Glory! I believe that is the first time a flag has ever volunteered to be burned. Just full Kevorkian."

=== Others ===
Mark Meadows spoke at the event during a panel on Thursday morning, February 28. He criticized the Green New Deal, stating, "You know, with this Green New Deal, they’re trying to get rid of all the cows. But I’ve got good news: Chick-fil-A stock will go way up because we are gonna be eating more chicken!"

During a panel on Thursday afternoon, African-American second amendment rights activists were interviewed, including Maj Toure, the founder of Black Guns Matter; Antonia Okafor, founder of EmPOWERed; and Niger Innis, spokesman for the Congress of Racial Equality.

On Thursday night, Sebastian Gorka gave a "fiery speech" criticizing Alexandria Ocasio-Cortez, whom he branded a "socialist."

On Friday, Ted Cruz had a panel with National Review editor Rich Lowry. Cruz criticized Democrats, stating, "I think there is a technical description for what’s going on, which is that Democrats have gone batcrap crazy. They are getting more and more and more extreme on every issue."

Other speakers or guest panelists included Vice President Mike Pence, Lindsey Graham, Laura Ingraham, Diamond and Silk, Mark Levin, Nigel Farage, Charlie Kirk, David Limbaugh, Candace Owens, Michelle Malkin, Kay Coles James, Tom Fitton, Deneen Borelli, Dennis Prager, Larry Kudlow, Glenn Beck, Jerry Falwell, Jr., Bill Hagerty, Wilbur Ross, Pete Hegseth, Matt Gaetz, Sarah Palin, Jenny Beth Martin, and Carly Fiorina.

== Activities ==
The Daily Beast stated Turning Point USA's Thursday night party was "the most sought-after party" of the conference, with many notable people attending, including Bill Shine, Benny Johnson, Jacob Wohl, Charlie Kirk, Candace Owens, Dan Crenshaw, and Kimberly Guilfoyle. Donald Trump Jr. was the featured speaker of the party, while Ted Cruz was the honored guest.

A panel led by David Perdue focused on reducing the national debt.

Author DeAnna Lorraine arranged a "Tribute to Men" event, during which she criticized the Boy Scouts of America for admitting girls, calling them the "Soy Scouts."
