= Ivory Tower (2014 film) =

- Film Poster
- Directed by: Andrew Rossi
- Written by: Andrew Rossi
- Produced by: Andrew Rossi; Josh Braun
- Cinematography: Andrew Coffman; Andrew Rossi; Bryan Sarkinen
- Edited by: Chad Beck; Christopher Branca; Andrew Coffman; Andrew Rossi
- Music by: Ian Hultquist
- Production companies: CNN Films; Participant Media
- Distributed by: Samuel Goldwyn Films; Paramount Home Media Distribution
- Release dates: January 18, 2014 (Sundance); June 13, 2014 (United States)
- Running time: 90 minutes
- Country: United States
- Language: English
- Box office: $106,771

Ivory Tower is a 2014 American documentary film written, directed and produced by Andrew Rossi. The film premiered in the competition category of the U.S. Documentary Competition program at the 2014 Sundance Film Festival on January 18, 2014.

After its premiere at Sundance Film Festival, Participant Media, Paramount Pictures and Samuel Goldwyn Films acquired distribution rights of the film. The film had a theatrical release on June 13, 2014, in the United States by Samuel Goldwyn Films. Paramount Pictures handled the international release of the film, while Participant Media handled the campaign for the film's theatrical release. The film was first broadcast on CNN on November 20, 2014.

== Synopsis ==
The film questions the value of higher education in an era when the price of college has increased more than any other service in the United States. It explores the different types of higher education around the nation. These include: community colleges, four year universities, vocational schools, online courses, and less traditional forms of education. The film argues that the high cost of tuition is at a breaking point.

== Reception ==
The film was named one of the best documentaries of 2014 by Indiewire. Frank Bruni of The New York Times called the film "an astonishingly thorough tour of the university landscape." Matt Goldberg in his review for Collider said that "Ivory Tower almost seems ambivalent about the college crisis, but it’s never cold or emotionless." Todd McCarthy of The Hollywood Reporter gave the film a positive review, calling it "a stimulating and upsetting look at how high tuition and huge student loans have created a perfect storm over American colleges." On Rotten Tomatoes, the film has an aggregate score of 83% based on 43 positive and 9 negative critic reviews. The website's consensus reads: "Although Ivory Tower makes it clear that there isn't enough room in a 90-minute film to tackle spiraling student loan debt, it also serves as a compelling call for deeper investigation."
