= After Truth: Disinformation and the Cost of Fake News =

2020 film by Andrew Rossi

- Poster
- Directed by: Andrew Rossi
- Music by: Ian Hultquist
- Country of origin: United States
- Original language: English

Production
- Producer: Andrew Rossi
- Cinematography: Bryan Sarkinen
- Editor: Cindy Lee
- Running time: 95 minutes
- Production company: HBO Documentary Films

Original release
- Network: HBO
- Release: March 19, 2020

After Truth: Disinformation and the Cost of Fake News is a 2020 documentary television film directed by Andrew Rossi and executive produced by Brian Stelter. The film premiered on HBO on March 19, 2020.

== Summary ==
The film surveys the effects of disinformation campaigns occurring on social media and the impacts of well known conspiracy theories from Obama birther theories and Jade Helm, to Seth Rich, to Pizzagate, as well as some of the major and minor personalities involved. "Disinformation" is the intentional dissemination of falsehoods. The documentary shows that although the elements of fake news are not new, modern fake news is enhanced and amplified by information technology. The roots of fake news are distrust and exploitation. "Inevitably, [the film] confronts the question of what we should do about fake news." It also shows the background of two conspiracy theorists to create and promote a conspiracy theory regarding Robert Mueller in order to smear him while serving as special counsel.

The film's main theme is framed by "dash-cam footage of Edgar Maddison Welch" as he drove with a high powered gun from North Carolina to Comet Ping Pong pizzeria in Washington, D.C., with intent to stop what he delusively believed to be a "child sex slave ring". The film shows the Pizzagate conspiracy growing on Reddit and 4chan, how it was fomented by the alt-right and Alex Jones, which then translated into a real-life dangerous situation that occurred beyond the internet.

== Cast ==
- Jerome Corsi
- Brother of Seth Rich
- James Alefantis
- Jack Burkman

== Reception ==
On the review aggregator website Rotten Tomatoes, 100% of 12 critics' reviews are positive, with an average rating of 7.0/10. The website's consensus reads: "Expansive in scope and methodically researched, After Truth is a chilling thesis on how disinformation corrodes every corner of society."
