= Thought Crimes: The Case of the Cannibal Cop =

- Official poster
- Directed by: Erin Lee Carr
- Produced by: Erin Lee Carr; Andrew Rossi
- Starring: Gilberto Valle
- Cinematography: Bryan Sarkinen
- Edited by: Andrew Coffman
- Music by: Ian Hultquist
- Production companies: HBO Documentary Films; Rubrio Pictures
- Distributed by: HBO
- Release dates: April 20, 2015 (Tribeca); May 11, 2015 (United States)
- Running time: 81 minutes
- Country: United States
- Language: English

Thought Crimes: The Case of the Cannibal Cop is a 2015 American documentary film directed and produced by Erin Lee Carr. The film follows Gilberto Valle, a former NYPD cop who was charged with conspiring to kidnap and eat women.

The film had its world premiere at the Tribeca Film Festival on April 20, 2015. It was released on May 11, 2015, by HBO.

== Plot ==
The film follows Gilberto Valle, a former NYPD cop, who was charged with conspiring to kidnap and eat women. Facing a life sentence Valle argued it was a fantasy and had no real plans, which led to a stunning reversal. Valle, Violet Blue, Joseph DeMarco, Gary Allen, James A. Cohen, Daniel Engber, David Greenfield, Dareh Gregorian, Alan Dershowitz, Robert Kolker, Chris Kraft, Erin Murphy, Laurie Penny, Jane Rosenberg, Lee Rowland, Maria Tatar, and Michael Welner appear in the film.

== Release ==
The film had its world premiere at the Tribeca Film Festival on April 20, 2015. It was released on May 11, 2015, by HBO. It was produced for HBO Documentary Films

== Reception ==
=== Critical reception ===
Thought Crimes: The Case of the Cannibal Cop holds an 89% approval rating on review aggregator website Rotten Tomatoes, based on 9 reviews, with a weighted average of 6.20/10.
