= Bryan Sarkinen =

American cinematographer

- Education: New York University
- Occupation: Cinematographer

Bryan Sarkinen is an American cinematographer, best known for shooting documentaries such as The First Monday in May (2016).

== Life and career ==
Sarkinen graduated from NYU in 1999 where he produced a movie interview show called The Final Cut. He talked to filmmakers and actors such as Danny Boyle, Wong Kar-Wai, Jim Jarmusch, Leonardo DiCaprio and Christian Bale about their advice for students. He even went to the Cannes Film Festival in 1998 to conduct interviews. His classmates at school included Sam Esmail and Peter Sollett.

In 2003 though a connection made while interning at The Today Show, Sarkinen shot The Pact which would be his first documentary for Spark Media. Spark would also send him to Bangladesh, Yemen and Burkina Faso to cover a story of early childhood marriage for the UNFPA.

In 2005, Sarkinen was brought into Bad Boy by Anthony Maddox where he would serve as Puff Daddy's personal cameraman for 3 years. He traveled all of Europe on the 2007 Snoop/Diddy tour as well as vacations in St. Tropez and Ibiza along with the behind the scenes of 2006's Press Play album.

In 2013 he shot Ivory Tower for CNN Films with director Andrew Rossi. The film premiered at the Sundance Film Festival and was released in cinemas in 2014 by Samuel Goldwyn Films and Participant Media. The film was nominated for a News & Documentary Emmy for outstanding business and economic reporting. His work has appeared on Bravo, MTV, HBO, Court TV, AXS-TV, CNN, and Discovery Channel, including Moonshiners which Sarkinen has lensed since 2012.

In 2014 Sarkinen shot Thought Crimes: The Case of the Cannibal Cop for director Erin Lee Carr. The film premiered on HBO in 2015. It was even on the list of things Steven Soderbergh watched that year.

Sarkinen's latest work, The First Monday in May (2016), follows the story of Andrew Bolton and Anna Wintour as they put together the 2015 Met Gala and China: Through the Looking Glass exhibit. The film was released by Magnolia Pictures in 2016 and is on the top of the documentary charts on iTunes and Amazon.

He also worked on Mommy Dead and Dearest which was on HBO in March 2017.

Andrew Rossi called Sarkinen,"A cinematographer who knows no limits" at this year's Tribeca Film Festival's Opening Night of The First Monday in May.

== Films ==
- The First Monday in May (2016) (cinematographer)
- Thought Crimes: The Case of the Cannibal Cop (2015) (cinematographer)
- Ivory Tower (2014) (cinematographer)
- Altina (2014) (cinematographer)
- No Evidence of DiseaseNo Evidence of Disease (2013) (cinematographer)
- Reject (2013) (cinematographer)
- Page One: Inside the New York Times (2011) (additional camera)
- The Pit (2009) (additional camera)
- Allah Made Me Funny (2008) (cinematographer)
- Le Cirque: A Table in Heaven (2007) (additional camera)
- The Pact (2006) (cinematographer)

== Television ==
- Moonshiners (2012–present)
- Gotham Comedy Live (2012–present)
- CNBC's American Originals (2009)
- Around the Block (2008)
- Under Fire (2006)
