= Soft Focus with Jena Friedman =

Series of TV specials on Adult Swim

- Genre: Cringe comedy Satire
- Created by: Jena Friedman
- Written by: Jena Friedman
- Directed by: Anu Valia (Special 1); Jena Friedman (Special 2)
- Presented by: Jena Friedman
- Theme music composer: Josh Epstein
- Country of origin: United States
- Original language: English
- No. of episodes: 2

Production
- Executive producers: Jena Friedman; Anu Valia (Special 1); Joshua Cohen; Mark Costa (Note: executive producer for Factual Productions, Inc.) (Special 1); Keith Crofford (Note: executive producer for Williams Street); Matt Harrigan
- Producers: Griffin Pocock; Paige Boudreaux (Note: producer for Factual Productions, Inc.)(Special 2)
- Editors: Jon Philpot (Special 1); Heather Capps (Special 2)
- Running time: 17 minutes (Special 1); 22 minutes (Special 2)
- Production companies: Factual Productions, Inc.; CNT Productions; Williams Street

Original release
- Network: Adult Swim
- Release: February 18, 2018 – January 25, 2019

Soft Focus with Jena Friedman is a series of TV specials created and hosted by Jena Friedman. The first special was aired on February 18, 2018, while the second on January 25, 2019. The specials are produced by Factual Productions, Inc. for air on Adult Swim.

A third Soft Focus special was in the works in 2020, but was ultimately cancelled due to production difficulties stemming from the COVID-19 pandemic.

== Plot ==
Each Soft Focus with Jena Friedman special starts off with an investigative report segment focusing on a sensitive subject such as rape or online harassment, resulting in a social experiment that also functions as a prank. The second half of each special features an interview with a controversial real-life figure.

== Episodes ==
No.	Title	Original release date	U.S. viewers (millions)
1	Soft Focus with Jena Friedman	February 18, 2018	N/A
The first segment, titled "Soft Focus Special Report: Campus Rape," draws inspiration from the teen pregnancy crisis by assigning male college students a life-size doll, named Cannot Consent Carrie, to take with them. Friedman tasks the men to take the dolls out and show them a good time. The second segment features an interview with Gilberto Valle, a former police officer known as the Cannibal Cop.
2	Soft Focus with Jena Friedman 2	January 25, 2019	N/A
The first segment, titled "Soft Focus Special Report: Sexual Harassment in Gaming," explores the problem facing women in gaming who are harassed by men. Friedman commissions a virtual reality game to test on male gamers to give them the experience of being a woman in gaming. The second segment features an interview with software entrepreneur and presidential hopeful, John McAfee.

== Release ==
The first episode of Soft Focus premiered on Adult Swim's live video stream on February 16, 2018, was released for on demand streaming shortly after, and premiered on television on Sunday, February 18, 2018. The second special was released similarly, albeit over the course of the same day, with the live stream, on demand premiere, and television premiere all occurring on Friday, January 25, 2019.

== Cancelled Special ==
A third Soft Focus with Jena Friedman was in the works in 2020, but was ultimately cancelled due to the lockdowns during the COVID-19 pandemic. The special would have featured segments on revenge porn and anti-trans bathroom bills. The bathroom bill segment was later release on Jena Friedman's YouTube channel and features interviews with straight pride activist Don Grundmann as well as trans woman and Cal State LA Professor Talia Bettcher.
