= Le Cirque: A Table in Heaven =

Le Cirque: A Table In Heaven
- Directed by: Andrew Rossi
- Produced by: Gregory P. Heyman; Charles Marquardt; Kate Novack
- Starring: Sirio Maccioni; Woody Allen; Tony Bennett; Billy Joel; Donald Trump; Melania Trump; Mario Maccioni; Marco Maccioni; Mauro Maccioni; Egidiana Maccioni; Soon Yi Previn; Bill Cosby; Joan Collins; Robert De Niro
- Cinematography: Andrew Rossi
- Edited by: Charles Marquardt; Jim Mol; Andrew Rossi
- Music by: Stephen O'Reilly
- Distributed by: HBO
- Release date: April 11, 2007 (Full Frame Film Festival)
- Running time: 78 minutes
- Country: United States
- Language: English

Le Cirque: A Table In Heaven is a 2007 American documentary film directed by Andrew Rossi about the reopening of the Le Cirque restaurant in New York City. Before being released by HBO, the film premiered at the 2007 Full Frame Film Festival and went on to play at the 2007 Hamptons Film Festival, the 2008 Berlin International Film Festival, and the 2008 Sarasota Film Festival, among others.

== Critical reception ==
SFGate said "The squabbling among a family of restaurateurs may not amount to a hill of haricots verts in the greater scheme of things. Yet the real appeal of Rossi's film, in the end, isn't so much whether Le Cirque rises or falls but rather the story of a father trying nobly to hold on to his traditions against inevitability. That makes "Le Cirque: A Table in Heaven" appealing to every taste."

Variety wrote "Director Andrew Rossi assembles the story as if building a puzzle in quadrants, suggesting each section is just as important as the next. The story does not turn dramatic until conflicts arise over the new Le Cirque, and even those are hardly life-shattering.

It currently boasts a 6.6/10 rating on IMDb.
