= Sirio Maccioni =

Italian restaurateur and author (1932–2020)

- Born: 5 April 1932; Montecatini Terme, Italy
- Died: 20 April 2020 (aged 88); Montecatini Terme, Italy
- Spouse(s): Egidiana Maccioni, married 1964
- Children: Mario Maccioni, Marco Maccioni, Mauro Maccioni
- Culinary career
- Current restaurants
- Le Cirque, Le Cirque Cafe New York, The Beach Club by Le Cirque, Le Cirque New Delhi, Le Cirque Las Vegas, Osteria del Circo New York, Osteria del Circo Las Vegas, Osteria del Circo Abu Dhabi, Sirio Ristorante Las Vegas, Sirio Ristorante at The Pierre Hotel
- Previous restaurants
- Le Cirque at the Mayfair Hotel (1974-1997), Le Cirque 2000 at the Palace Hotel (1997-2005)
- Website: lecirque.com

Sirio Maccioni (5 April 1932 – 20 April 2020) was an Italian restaurateur and author known for opening Le Cirque.

== Biography ==
Maccioni began his career at Oscar's Delmonico. Its owner, Oscar Tucci, once stated, "Sirio and with Tony May will be some of the greatest restaurateurs that will come out of Delmonico's."

He was awarded the Impresario dell’Anno (Entrepreneur of the Year) award at Affreschi Toscani. Maccioni was known for Le Cirque, his flagship French restaurant, and for other ventures in New York City, Las Vegas, the Dominican Republic, New Delhi and Abu Dhabi, which he ran with his wife Egidiana “Egi” and sons Mario, Marco, and Mauro.

In June 2004, Maccioni published his autobiography, Sirio: The Story of My Life and Le Cirque, with Bloomberg L.P.'s restaurant critic Peter Elliot. On television, he appeared as a guest judge on Top Chef and the 48th Annual Miss Universe Pageant, and as himself in Charlie Rose, Behind Closed Doors and Eat This New York.

In 2007, Maccioni and his family were featured in a behind-the-scenes documentary film Le Cirque: A Table in Heaven, which details Le Cirque's 2006 move from the Palace Hotel to the Bloomberg building on East 58th St. Maccioni and several recipes from his restaurants are featured in Egidiana Maccioni's The Maccioni Family Cookbook. In 2012, Sirio Maccioni authored A Table at Le Cirque with Pamela Fiori, published by Rizzoli.

Maccioni has been credited as the creator of pasta primavera, though that attribution has been challenged.

== Personal life ==
Maccioni was married to Egidiana Maccioni. The couple had three sons: Mario, a graduate of New York University; Marco, a graduate of Cornell University School of Hotel Administration; and Mauro, a graduate of Columbia University.

Maccioni died at his home in Montecatini Terme, Italy, on 20 April 2020. His death was unrelated to the COVID-19 pandemic.

== Restaurants ==
Over his career, Maccioni operated the following restaurants:

- Le Cirque first opened at the Mayfair Regent Hotel in 1974. It closed and reopened as Le Cirque 2000 at the Helmsley Palace Hotel in 1997. The latest installation opened in 2006 in the Bloomberg Tower building at One Beacon Court (151 East 58th Street).
- Le Cirque Las Vegas at Bellagio Hotel
- Le Cirque New Delhi (The Leela, New Delhi)
- Le Cirque Cafe (58th St./Third Ave.)
- The Beach Club by Le Cirque (Casa de Campo, Dominican Republic)
- Circo New York (120 West 55th street, between Sixth & Seventh Aves.)
- Circo Las Vegas at the Bellagio (hotel and casino)
- Circo Abu Dhabi
- Sirio Ristorante (The Aria Resort and Casino)
- Sirio Ristorante at The Pierre Hotel

== Awards ==
- Impresario dell’ Anno (Entrepreneur of the Year) award at Affreschi Toscani Tuscany.
- 1995 - Sirio Maccioni deemed a “Living Landmark” by the New York Landmarks Conservancy,
- 2000: Joe Baum Lifetime Achievement Award from The Food Allergy Initiative.
- 2002- Father of the Year, National Father's Day Committee
- 2003- Fine Dining Legend Winner Nation's Restaurant News
- 2007: Michelin Guide One-Star for Le Cirque in Las Vegas.
- 2012: Sirio Maccioni honored at Palm Beach Food & Wine Festival.
- 2013: Sirio Maccioni awarded First "Euro-Toques Italia International Award" by Eurotoques Italy association in Montecatini Terme.
- 2013: Sirio Maccioni and Family inducted into Esquire Magazine's 2013 Restaurant "Hall of Fame"
- 2013: Sirio Maccioni to receive "Pioneer Award" by The Best of Silver State Awards in Nevada.
- 2014: James Beard Foundation Award, Lifetime Achievement
