= United States v. Valle =

2015 criminal case

- Court: United States Court of Appeals for the Second Circuit
- Decided: December 3, 2015
- Citation: 807 F.3d 508, 40 Int'l Env't Rep. (BNA) 1735

Case history
- Appealed from: Southern District of New York

Court membership
- Judges sitting: Chester J. Straub, Barrington D. Parker Jr., Susan L. Carney

Case opinions
- Majority: Parker, joined by Carney
- Dissent: Straub

United States v. Valle was a criminal case in the Southern District of New York concerning Gilberto Valle, a New York City Police Department officer who had discussed on online fetish chatrooms his fantasies about kidnapping, torturing, raping, killing, and cannibalizing various women he knew, and had used a police database to find the addresses of some. Dubbed the "Cannibal Cop" by the media, Valle was convicted by a jury of conspiracy to commit kidnapping and, for the use of the police database, violations of the Computer Fraud and Abuse Act (CFAA).

The presiding judge, however, acquitted Valle on the conspiracy charges notwithstanding the verdict, ruling that the prosecution had not proven that Valle's online communications went beyond "fantasy role-play". On appeal, the United States Court of Appeals for the Second Circuit upheld the judge's judgment of acquittal and further ruled Valle's misuse of the police database did not constitute a violation of the CFAA, thus acquitting him of the lesser charge.

The case drew widespread attention for its unusual nature and for the question it posed of at what point exploration of dark fetishes becomes criminal conspiracy. Valle spent 21 months in prison between his arrest and the conclusion of his trial, seven of them in solitary confinement. The case was later the subject of the documentary Thought Crimes: The Case of the Cannibal Cop.

== Background ==
=== Gilberto Valle ===
Gilberto Valle
- Born: Gilberto Valle III; April 14, 1984 (age 42); Queens, New York, U.S
- Occupations: Construction company employee; Novelist; Police officer (former)
- Spouse: Kathleen Mangan (m. 2010; div. 2013)
- Children: 1

Gilberto Valle III was born on April 14, 1984. His parents separated when he was young. He was raised in Middle Village, Queens, New York, and attended Archbishop Molloy High School. He attended the University of Maryland, graduating in 2006 with a degree in psychology.

Valle joined the New York City Police Department in 2006, and was assigned to the 26th Precinct in Morningside Heights, Manhattan. He met a woman on the dating website OkCupid and married her in Spokane, Washington, in 2010. They had a daughter in early 2012.

=== Dark Fetish Net ===
After Valle's daughter was born, he became active on Dark Fetish Net, a forum dedicated to sexual fetishes and fantasies involving torture, rape, murder and cannibalism. He chatted with 24 other users about kidnapping, raping, torturing, killing, and cannibalizing more than 100 women, including his wife. In 21 of the 24 conversations, Valle made clear that what he was saying was fantasy, writing in one email conversation, "No matter what I say, it's make believe ... I just have a world in my mind". Valle's attitude in the other three conversations ranged from ambiguity about his intentions to claiming that he was sincere.

=== Investigation and arrest ===
Valle's wife discovered his Dark Fetish Net posts and reported him to the police. On October 25, 2012, Valle was arrested and charged with conspiracy to commit kidnapping. He was fired from the NYPD following his arrest.

== Trial and judgment of acquittal ==
Valle faced a maximum of life in prison for the conspiracy charge, and a maximum of five years for accessing the federal National Crime Information Center database without authorization. Valle's wife testified against him during the trial. Throughout the trial, Valle attempted to employ the fantasy defense claiming that the chat room communications were mere fantasy and that he had no intention of acting on them. He was found guilty of both charges in March 2013.

Judge Paul G. Gardephe of Federal District Court overturned Valle's conviction on the conspiracy charge in June 2014, saying the evidence supported his contention that he was engaged in only "fantasy role-play". The lesser conviction regarding the database remained standing. Valle had, at this point, served 21 months in prison. He was released from prison into home confinement at his mother’s house. In November, the judge ended Valle’s home confinement, sentencing him to time served and one year of supervised release, including mental health treatment. The government appealed the dismissal of the conspiracy charge to the Second Circuit, while Valle similarly appealed his conviction on the database access charge.

== Appeal to the Second Circuit ==
The United States Court of Appeals for the Second Circuit ruled on December 3, 2015, upholding Valle’s acquittal on the conspiracy charge and overruling his conviction on the unauthorized access charge. The opinion stated:

The Government appeals from the district court's judgment of acquittal on the conspiracy count, and Valle separately appeals from the judgment of conviction on the CFAA count. Because we agree that there was insufficient evidence as to the existence of a genuine agreement to kidnap and of Valle's specific intent to commit a kidnapping, we affirm the district court's judgment of acquittal on the conspiracy count. Because we find that the district court's construction of the CFAA violates the rule of lenity, we reverse the judgment of conviction on the CFAA count.

== Media ==
- A memoir, Raw Deal: The Untold Story of the NYPD's "Cannibal Cop", in which the author raises the question of when a thought becomes a crime. Co-written with Brian Whitney and published by WildBlue Press.
- A documentary film, Thought Crimes: The Case of the Cannibal Cop, chronicled Valle's arrest, trial, imprisonment, and release. Directed by Erin Lee Carr, the film debuted on HBO on May 11, 2015.
- An episode of Law & Order: Special Victims Unit titled "Thought Criminal" was inspired by Valle's case.
- An episode in 2018 of the Adult Swim show Soft Focus with Jena Friedman featured an interview with Valle and his participation in a The Dating Game-style contest.
