= Andrew Rossi =

American filmmaker

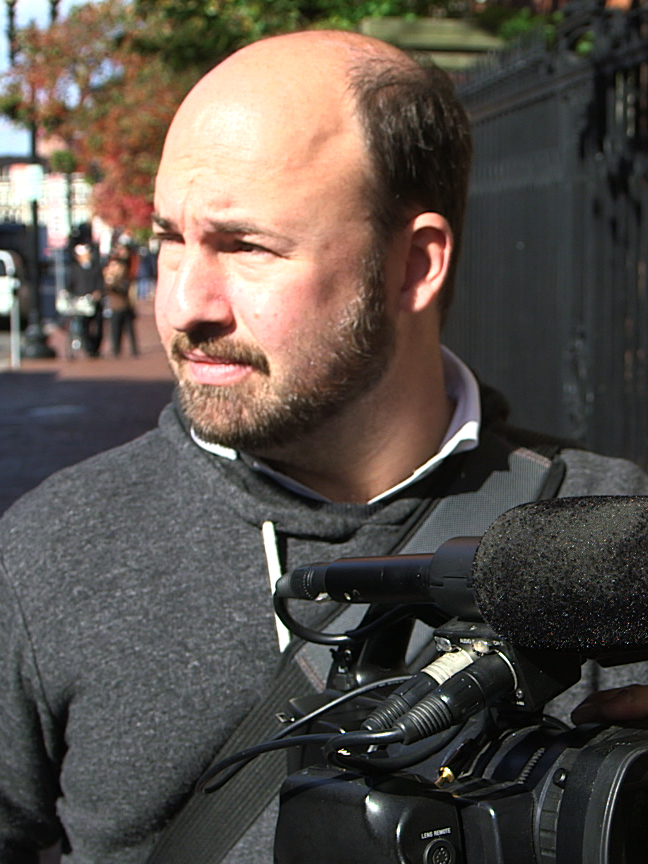
- Andrew Rossi at work
- Born: United States
- Occupations: Film director, film producer, cinematographer, editor

Andrew Rossi is an American filmmaker, Emmy nominated for directing, writing and producing The Andy Warhol Diaries (2022), Ivory Tower (2014) and Page One: Inside the New York Times (2011).

== Career ==
Rossi is the founder of Abstract Productions, a company that produces film and television. He was nominated for three Emmy Awards for writing, directing and executive producing the Netflix series The Andy Warhol Diaries in 2022.

In 2011, Rossi directed Page One: Inside the New York Times, which premiered at the Sundance Film Festival and was nominated for two News & Documentary Emmys and a 2011 Critics' Choice Award for Best Documentary. The film was co-distributed by Magnolia Pictures and Participant Media.

In 2013, Rossi began production on his next film about the transformation of higher education. The film, Ivory Tower, premiered at the Sundance Film Festival and was theatrically distributed in 2014 by Samuel Goldwyn Films and Participant Media. After airing on CNN, the film was nominated for a News & Documentary Emmy for outstanding business and economic reporting.

Rossi's next film as director, The First Monday in May (2016), focused on the annual Met Gala and the Met's Costume Institute. The movie premiered as the opening night film at the 2016 Tribeca Film Festival. The year after Rossi directed Bronx Gothic, a collaboration with writer and performer Okwui Okpokwasili that captures her critically acclaimed one-woman show, Bronx Gothic. Writing in the New Yorker, Hilton Als called Okpokwasili's Bronx Gothic "A tour de force on the order of Toni Morrison's The Bluest Eye, the author's seminal text on black girlhood and power."

In 2018, Rossi produced Kate Novack's The Gospel According to Andre, a biopic about legendary fashion editor Andre Leon Talley. He also executive produced the Netflix series 7 Days Out, directing episodes on the scientists and engineers behind NASA's Cassini mission, a final haute couture show from designer Karl Lagerfeld and the Westminster Dog Show. In 2018, Rossi was admitted into the Academy of Motion Picture Arts and Sciences.

In 2020 Rossi directed HBO's After Truth: Disinformation and the Cost of Fake News investigating the origins of conspiracies like pizzagate and the spread of false news from sites like 4Chan to the mainstream media. After Truth was a finalist for the duPont award in journalism.

In 2021, the short film Hysterical Girl about the legacy of Freud's "Dora" case, directed by Kate Novack and produced by Rossi, was shortlisted for an Academy Award for best short film. Hysterical Girl was also nominated for an Emmy and the IDA's Best Documentary Short award.

In 2022, Rossi wrote, directed and executive produced The Andy Warhol Diaries. He took several years to secure the rights and adapt the diaries into a hybrid that combines recreations, archive and interviews before beginning production in 2020. The Netflix Series was nominated for a Gotham Award for Breakthrough Nonfiction Series, four primetime Emmys, and it won the GALECA award for Best Documentary Series, 2022.

In 2015, Rossi produced Thought Crimes, an HBO documentary about the case of the Cannibal Cop that examines the First Amendment implications of policing communication in fantasy forums online. This was his first collaboration with director Erin Lee Carr. In 2017, Rossi produced Carr's follow up to Thought Crimes for HBO, Mommy Dead and Dearest. Premiering at the SXSW Film Festival, the film tells the shocking story of Gypsy Rose Blancharde, who killed her mother after a lifetime of abuse as a victim of Dee Dee's Munchausen by proxy syndrome. They went on to produce Carr's two part film I Love You, Now Die: The Commonwealth Vs. Michelle Carter with the same team at Abstract Productions, which premiered on HBO in 2019.

== Filmography ==
Year	Title	Credited as					Ref.
Year	Title	Director	Writer	Producer	Cinematographer	Editor	Ref.
2004	Eat This New York	Yes	No	Yes	Yes	Yes	
2004	Control Room	No	No	Associate	No	Additional	
2005	The Sky Did Not Fall	Yes	No	Yes	Yes	Yes	
2007	Le Cirque: A Table in Heaven	Yes	No	Yes	Yes	Yes	
2011	Page One: Inside the New York Times	Yes	No	Yes	Yes	Additional	
2014	Ivory Tower	Yes	Yes	Yes	Yes	Yes	
2015	Thought Crimes: The Case of the Cannibal Cop	No	No	Yes	No	No	
2016	The First Monday in May	Yes	No	No	Yes	No	
2017	Mommy Dead and Dearest	No	No	Yes	No	No	
2017	Bronx Gothic	Yes	No	Yes	Yes	Co-editor	
2018	The Gospel According to André	No	No	Yes	No	No	
2019	I Love You, Now Die: The Commonwealth V. Michelle Carter	No	No	Yes	No	No	
2019	7 Days Out	Yes	No	Executive	No	No	
2019	The Queen's Man	No	No	Yes	No	No	
2020	After Truth: Disinformation and the Cost of Fake News	Yes	No	Yes	No	No	
2020	Hysterical Girl	No	No	Yes	No	No	
2022	The Andy Warhol Diaries	Yes	Yes	Executive	No	No	

== Early life and education ==
Rossi grew up in New York and graduated from Yale College and Harvard Law School.
