= Andean Medjedovic =

Canadian fugitive accused of cryptocurrency hacking

- Born: November 2002 (age 23); Canada
- Known for: Crypto fugitive

Andean Medjedovic is a Canadian accused by United States and European authorities of involvement in alleged cryptocurrency fraud and hacking schemes involving decentralized finance (DeFi) platforms.

== Early life ==
Andean Medjedovic was born in Hamilton, Ontario, to Ediz and Sanja Medjedovic, two Bosnian nationals who emigrated to Canada during the Bosnian War. At the age of 14 Medjedovic was the youngest student to graduate from the Hamilton-Wentworth District School Board, and was profiled by the local news. He studied pure mathematics at the University of Waterloo, and completed his bachelor's degree in three years and a master's degree in one year. Medjedovic was a proficient coder, regularly participating in an online hacking competitions called Code4rena or C4 and won rewards in two competitions.

== Alleged crimes ==
Authorities allege that Medjedovic exploited vulnerabilities in decentralized finance platforms, including Indexed Finance and KyberSwap, resulting in approximately US$65 million in losses. The alleged exploits involved manipulating smart contract systems used to determine asset prices and liquidity. One incident involving KyberSwap in 2023 resulted in losses of approximately US$48 million.

Medjedovic failed to attend court appearances and was found in contempt of court.

== International movements ==
Medjedovic has traveled through multiple countries while evading authorities, alleged to be using false identities and passports. He used a false Slovak passport in at least one instance and traveled through jurisdictions including Brazil, the United Arab Emirates, and several European countries. An Interpol Red Notice was issued in connection with the case.

Medjedovic was arrested in Belgrade, Serbia, in 2024. He was held for several months but later released after a court rejected an extradition request. Following his release, his whereabouts became unclear. He is believed to have left Serbia, and his location was unknown as of 2026.

As of 2026, Medjedovic remains at large and is wanted by authorities in the United States and Europe.

== Attempt at pardon ==
In March 2026, Medjedovic hired lobbying firm JM Burkman & Associates to campaign for a pardon via the firm's contacts in the Trump administration.

== "Code is law" argument ==
For his defense, Medjedovic argued that programmed code is the law. He argues if the code includes a vulnerability, which can be exploited, for example, to take possession of another person's crypto, the existence of that vulnerability makes lawful any action which can be achieved through its manipulation. Medjedovic's civil case is potentially the first Canadian test of the argument.

In a 2022 email interview with Bloomberg Businessweek, Medjedovic argued that he had executed a perfectly legal series of trades, and said that he had interacted with publicly available smart contracts according to their programmed rules rather than gaining unauthorized access to a computer system.

== Media coverage ==
Medjedovic is a subject of the 2025 documentary Code Is Law, directed by James Craig and Louis Giles. A 2026 CBC documentary program The Fifth Estate broadcast an episode Canada's Crypto Fugitive which investigated Medjedovic's alleged cryptocurrency activities and international movements.
