= Le Cirque =

French restaurant originating in New York City

- Interactive map of Le Cirque

Restaurant information
- Established: 1974; 52 years ago
- Closed: 2018; 8 years ago
- Owner: Maccioni Family
- Food type: French
- Dress code: Formal
- Location: 151 East 58th Street in Midtown Manhattan, New York City, New York, 10022, United States
- Website: lecirque.com

Le Cirque is a French restaurant that had several locations throughout the New York City borough of Manhattan from 1974 to 2018. The New York location is closed, with its future status unknown. Other locations in Dubai and India remain operational.

== New York City history ==
Le Cirque was established in 1974 by Italian Sirio Maccioni and continued to be run by the family to its closure in 2018. It opened at the Mayfair Regent Hotel at 58 East 65th Street in March 1974. From 1986 to 1992, Daniel Boulud was executive chef. In 1995, it was awarded the James Beard Foundation Award for Outstanding Restaurant.

Boulud was succeeded in 1992 by Sylvain Portay, and later Sottha Kuhn, Pierre Schaedelin, Christophe Bellanca (2007–2008) Craig Hopson (beginning in 2008), and Olivier Reginensi. In 1993, the tasting menu cost $90. The restaurant at the Mayfair closed in 1996. In 1997, it reopened as Le Cirque 2000 at the Palace Hotel, where it remained a hotspot to 2002.

In 2006, the restaurant moved to a location in the Bloomberg Tower building at One Beacon Court (151 East 58th Street) and operated as Le Cirque New York at One Beacon Court. It comprised 16,000 square feet (1,500 square meters) and was designed by interior designer Adam Tihany and architect Costas Kondylis. The family's efforts to transition the restaurant were featured in the documentary film Le Cirque: A Table In Heaven directed by Andrew Rossi.

Le Cirque filed for bankruptcy in March 2017, but promised to stay open. However, Le Cirque New York closed on January 1, 2018, due to rising rent costs and other operational challenges, but operated private events on a boat in 2019. Its future plans were unknown as of 2021 due to the impact of the COVID-19 pandemic on the restaurant industry and the 2020 death of founder Sirio Maccioni.

== Other locations ==
As of 2026, there are Le Cirque locations in Dubai and three Indian locations: New Delhi, Mumbai, and Bangalore.

Their lower-end sister brand Circo has a location in Abu Dhabi and at the Ritz Carlton in Dubai. The Dallas location closed. The Las Vegas location ceased operations after its final dinner service on August 23, 2026.

== See also ==
- List of Michelin-starred restaurants in Las Vegas
- Restaurants in the Las Vegas Valley
