= Candyman (film series) =

American horror film series

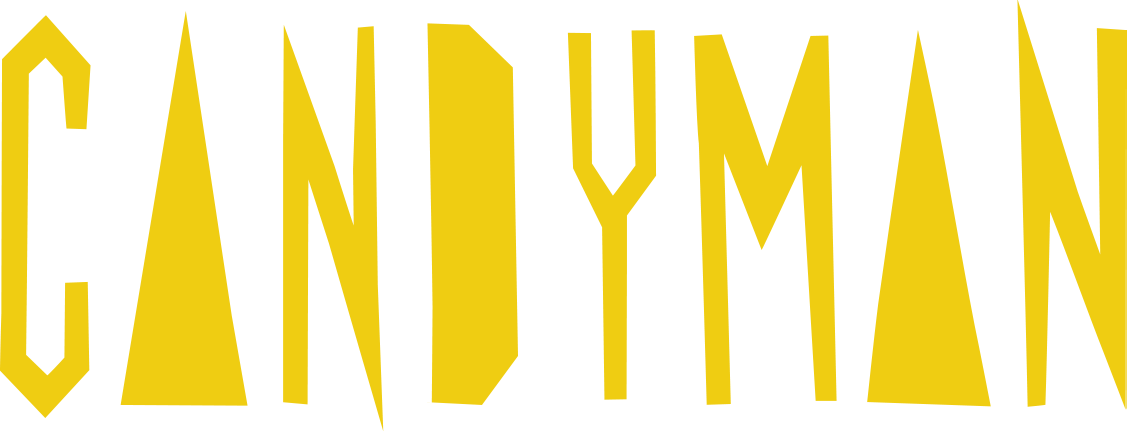
- The logo of the franchise as of 2021
- Created by: Clive Barker
- Original work: The Forbidden (1985)
- Owners: TriStar Pictures (1); Gramercy Pictures (2); Artisan Entertainment (3); Universal Pictures, Metro-Goldwyn-Mayer (4)
- Years: 1985–2021

Films and television
- Film(s): Candyman (1992); Candyman: Farewell to the Flesh (1995); Candyman 3: Day of the Dead (1999); Candyman (2021)

Audio
- Soundtrack(s): Candyman (2021)

Candyman is an American supernatural horror franchise originating from the 1985 short story "The Forbidden" from the collection Books of Blood by Clive Barker, about the legend of the "Candyman", the ghost of an artist and son of a slave who was murdered in the late 19th century. Its film adaptation, Candyman, directed by Bernard Rose in 1992, starred Tony Todd as the title character.

Although the film initially underperformed at the American box office, it became a cult classic. A novelization and a comic adaptation of the film were released in the same year. Two sequels, Candyman: Farewell to the Flesh (1995) and Candyman 3: Day of the Dead (1999), were released. A direct sequel to the original Candyman, directed by Nia DaCosta and produced by Jordan Peele, was released in 2021.

== Films ==
Film	U.S. release date	Box office totals (domestic gross)	Director	Screenwriters	Story by	Producer(s)
Candyman	October 16, 1992	$25.8 million	Bernard Rose	Bernard Rose	Bernard Rose	Alan Poul, Steve Golin & Sigurjon Sighvatsson
Candyman: Farewell to the Flesh	March 17, 1995	$25 million	Bill Condon	Rand Ravich & Mark Kruger	Clive Barker	Gregg Fienberg & Sigurjón Sighvatsson
Candyman 3: Day of the Dead	July 9, 1999	$0.6 million (limited release)	Turi Meyer	Turi Meyer & Al Septien	Turi Meyer & Al Septien	Al Septien & William Stuart
Candyman	August 27, 2021	$77.4 million	Nia DaCosta	Nia DaCosta, Jordan Peele & Win Rosenfeld	Nia DaCosta, Jordan Peele & Win Rosenfeld	Ian Cooper, Jordan Peele & Win Rosenfeld

=== Candyman (1992) ===
Candyman, the first film in the series, is a 1992 horror film, serving as a loose adaptation of Clive Barker's 1985 short story "The Forbidden" of the collection Books of Blood. The film follows a graduate student, Helen Lyle, who is studying urban legends along with her colleague Bernadette.

She takes a strong interest in learning about a mysterious hook-handed murderer coined as "The Candyman" in the Cabrini Green urban project dwelling which many of the residents feared lived behind the mirrors and the walls of the apartments randomly killing them 'gutting' them with his hook after chanting his name 5 times in a mirror. Helen becomes intrigued by the mythical story that she jokingly summons him in denial and disbelief, later to learn who was really behind the mirror, questioning her reality.

=== Candyman: Farewell to the Flesh (1995) ===
Farewell to the Flesh is the second film in the series. The film follows the story of a school teacher, Annie Tarrant, who comes to learn about her family's past after losing her father due to his obsession with the Candyman. She denies his existence after hearing her students talk about him and learning that one of her students was obsessed with him. She speaks his name to prove he does not exist, but later finds out who Candyman is.

=== Candyman 3: Day of the Dead (1999) ===
Day of the Dead is the third film in the series. The story continues with Annie Tarrant's daughter, Caroline Mckeever, who is now an adult. She denies Candyman's existence by protecting her family's bloodline as her business partner Miguel uses the story of her Great Great Grandfather Daniel Robitaille/Candyman in his art exhibit for profit. Caroline soon learns why her mother tried to destroy the myth of Candyman but is caught in his web of deceptive murders, framing her in order for her to submit to become immortal as a family with him in death.

=== Candyman (2021) ===
A fourth film in the series was produced by Metro-Goldwyn-Mayer and Monkeypaw Productions and was released on August 27, 2021. Yahya Abdul-Mateen II stars in the film, while Tony Todd returns to the eponymous role. It is a direct sequel to the first film, taking place twenty-seven years later, in Cabrini Green, Chicago. A young, over-confident visual artist named Anthony McCoy struggles to find inspiration to get him further exposure.

He learns about an old urban legend that took place in the project housing developments at Cabrini Green of a grad student named Helen Lyle who became mentally insane during her research and sacrificed herself to save a baby, which sparks his interest. He further researches the information which leads him to encounter a neighborhood laundromat owner who also reveals his version of the urban legend, which is learned to be of an amputated hook-handed man in the 1970s named Sherman Fields who was wrongfully murdered at the hands of Chicago police officers which Cabrini Green residents believed him to be "The Candyman" who harmed children with razor blades in candy.

Anthony becomes obsessed with these urban legend findings as he uses them for his artwork presentation and to influence the summoning of the spirit of 'The Candyman', but later realizes the consequences of his actions as he learns the real truth behind the legend by his hallucinations, which in turn becomes a deadly reality.

The 2021 film reinterprets the Candyman legend by highlighting generational trauma and racial violence, positioning the figure as a reflection of historical injustices against Black communities.

Nia DaCosta's direction, and Jordan Peele's and Win Rosenfeld's co-writing, were a sequel as well as a spiritual prolongation of the first film. This project was praised for a variety of aspects such as visual style, social commentary, and the actors' performances, and it was also of historical significance as DaCosta became the first Black woman to direct a movie that ranked first in the U.S. box office. The success of the film made the franchise popular among a new generation and confirmed the status of Candyman as a culturally relevant horror property.

== Unrealized projects ==
According to Virginia Madsen, Bernard Rose originally wanted the first sequel Candyman 2 to be a prequel showing Candyman and Helen's "look-alike" falling in love, but the idea was turned down because the studio was worried about how a fully-fledged interracial romance would be received.

A possible fourth film was in development in 2004; according to Tony Todd, it was intended to be set in New England at a women's college, and focus on a professor who is a descendant of Candyman but has no idea who he is, with Todd describing "the initial image [being] of Candyman in a blizzard". The film was stuck in development hell.

The slasher crossover film Freddy vs. Jason (2003) also inspired Miramax to want to create a Candyman vs. Hellraiser crossover, but Clive Barker, originator of both franchises, had recommended against it. A crossover with the Leprechaun film series was also considered, but Tony Todd immediately flat out refused to participate in such a project, saying he had too much respect for his character to see him used for such a purpose.

== Cast and crew ==
=== Cast ===
List indicators
- This table shows the characters and the actors who have portrayed them throughout the franchise.
- A dark grey cell indicates the character was not in the film, or that the character's presence in the film has not yet been announced.
- A ^{Y} indicates an appearance as a younger version of a pre-existing character.
- A ^{P} indicates a photographic appearance.
- A ^{V} indicates a vocal appearance only.

Characters	Films			
Characters	Candyman	Candyman Farewell to the Flesh	Candyman Day of the Dead	Candyman
Characters	1992	1995	1999	2021
Daniel Robitaille Granville T. Candyman	Tony Todd	Tony Todd	Tony Todd	Tony Todd^{C}
Daniel Robitaille Granville T. Candyman				Yahya Abdul-Mateen II
Anthony McCoy	Latesha & Lanesha Martin			Yahya Abdul-Mateen II
Helen Lyle	Virginia Madsen	Virginia Madsen^{P}		Virginia Madsen^{V}^{P}
Anne-Marie McCoy	Vanessa A. Williams			Vanessa A. Williams
Phillip Purcell	Michael Culkin	Michael Culkin		
Trevor Lyle	Xander Berkeley			
Bernadette "Bernie" Walsh	Kasi Lemmons			
Jake	DeJuan Guy			
Detective Frank Valento	Gilbert Lewis			
Stacey	Carolyn Lowery			
Dr. Burke	Stanley DeSantis			
Billy	Ted Raimi			
Archie Walsh	Bernard Rose			
Harold	Eric Edwards			
Policewoman	Rusty Schwimmer			
Heyward Sullivan		Randy Oglesby		Randy Oglesby^{P}
Caroline Sullivan		Caroline Barclay	Laura Mazur	Cassie Kramer
Annie Tarrant		Kelly Rowan	Elizabeth Hayes	
Caroline McKeever Isabel Sullivan		Brianna Blanchard	Donna D'Errico	
Paul McKeever		Timothy Carhart	Mentioned	
Reverend Ellis		Bill Nunn		
Ethan Tarrant		William O'Leary		
Octavia Tarrant		Veronica Cartwright		
Honore Thibideaux		Matt Clark		
Matthew Ellis		Joshua Gibran Mayweather		
Detective Ray Levesque		David Gianopoulos		
Coleman Tarrant		Michael Bergeron		
Pam Carver		Fay Hauser		
Heyward Sullivan		Randy Oglesby		
The Kingfish		Glen Gomez Russell Buchanan^{V}		
Liz		Clotiel Bordeltier		
Drew		George Lemore		
Mr. Jeffries		Ralph Joseph		
Clara		Margaret Howell		
David de La Paz			Nick Corri	
Det. Jamal Matthews			Ernie Hudson Jr.	
Lt. Det. Samuel Deacon Kraft			Wade Williams	
L.V. Sacco			Robert O'Reilly	
Enrique			Lombardo Boyar	
Abuela			Lupe Ontiveros	
Flower Seller			Lillian Hurst	
Det. Jamie Gold			Elizabeth Guber	
Miguel Velasco			Mark Adair-Rios	
Lena			Rena Riffel	
Tino			Mike Moroff	
Ornte			Chris Van Dahl	
Tamara			Alexia Robinson	
Fritz			Jud Meyers	
Little Boy			Leonardo Guerra	
Cristina de La Paz			Nicole Contreras	
Ringleader				Nadia Simms
Brianna "Bri" Cartwright				Teyonah Parris Hannah Love Jones^{Y}
Finley Stephens				Rebecca Spence
Clive Privler				Brian King
Grady Smith				Kyle Kaminsky
Troy Cartwright				Nathan Stewart-Jarrett
William "Billy" Burke				Colman Domingo Rodney L. Jones III^{Y}
Danielle Harrington				Christiana Clark
Jameson				Carl Clemons-Hopkins
Gil Cartwright				Cedric Mays
Sherman Fields Candyman's Hive / Spirit				Michael Hargrove

=== Crew ===
Role	Film			
Role	Candyman	Candyman: Farewell to the Flesh	Candyman 3: Day of the Dead	Candyman
Role	1992	1995	1999	2021
Director(s)	Bernard Rose	Bill Condon	Turi Meyer	Nia DaCosta
Screenwriter(s)	Bernard Rose	Rand Ravich & Mark Kruger	Al Septien & Turi Meyer	Nia DaCosta, Jordan Peele & Win Rosenfeld
Producer(s)	Alan Poul, Steve Golin & Sigurjón Sighvatsson	Gregg Fienberg & Sigurjón Sighvatsson	Al Septien & William Stuart	Ian Cooper, Jordan Peele & Win Rosenfeld
Composer(s)	Philip Glass	Philip Glass	Adam Gorgoni	Robert A. A. Lowe
Cinematography	Anthony B. Richmond	Tobias A. Schliessler	Michael G. Wojciechowski	John Guleserian
Editor(s)	Dan Rae	Virginia Katz	Frederick Wardell	Chris Armstrong
Production companies	Propaganda Films; PolyGram Filmed Entertainment	Lava Productions	Artisan Entertainment	Bron Creative; Metro-Goldwyn-Mayer; Monkeypaw Productions
Distributor	TriStar Pictures	Gramercy Pictures	Artisan Entertainment	Universal Pictures
U.S. release date	October 16, 1992	March 17, 1995	July 9, 1999	August 27, 2021
Duration	99 minutes	95 minutes	93 minutes	91 minutes

== Reception ==
=== Box office performance ===
Film	Release date	Box office gross			Budget	Reference
Film	Release date	North America	Other territories	Worldwide	Budget	Reference
Candyman (1992)	October 16, 1992	$25,792,310	—N/a	—N/a	$8–9 million	
Candyman: Farewell to the Flesh	March 17, 1995	$13,940,383	—N/a	—N/a	$6 million	
Candyman 3: Day of the Dead	July 9, 1999	—N/a	—N/a	—N/a	—N/a	—N/a
Candyman (2021)	August 27, 2021	$50,668,490	$13,524,000	$64,192,490	$25 million	
Total		$62,102,693	$5,229,000	$67,331,693	$39 million	

=== Critical and public response ===
Film	Rotten Tomatoes	Metacritic	CinemaScore
Candyman (1992)	79% (82 reviews)	61 (15 reviews)	C+
Candyman: Farewell to the Flesh	22% (32 reviews)	—N/a	—N/a
Candyman 3: Day of the Dead	7% (14 reviews)	—N/a	—N/a
Candyman (2021)	84% (335 reviews)	72 (46 reviews)	B

== Music ==
Candyman (1992) and Candyman: Farewell to the Flesh soundtracks were composed by Philip Glass. According to Glass, "it has become a classic, so I still make money from that score, get checks every year". Tony Todd confirmed in an interview with IGN that a limited edition featuring 7500 copies of the film's soundtrack was released in February 2015. The composition "Candyman's Suite: Helen's Theme" became a widely popular theme song for Halloween and was often featured in a few television commercials and series including in one episode of American Horror Story: Asylum.

Candyman: Day of the Dead original score soundtrack was composed by Adam Gorgoni.

Candyman (2021) original score soundtrack was composed by Chicago musician Robert Aiki Aubrey Lowe who used solo compositions based on voice and extended modular synthesis techniques. He expressed in an interview with fellow musician DeForrest Brown Jr. that he used field recordings of Cabrini Green to capture the essence and spirit of the neighborhood and layered it as textural elements on top of the main instruments. In January 2022, Variety reported that Candyman's film score, briefly made the shortlist for the 2022 Academy Awards in the category of Best Original Score, however did not make the official final ballot list. Philip Glass' score "Helen's Theme/Music Box" was also reimagined by Lowe as a new interpolation on the soundtrack as well as in one scene and end credits of the film.

== Other media ==
=== Board game ===
A board game based on Candyman: Farewell to the Flesh was released during the mid-1990s as a promotional item for the film of the same name. The game features a board, 1 die and cards (Hook, Candyman, Voodoo, Mansion Key) that will impact the player or others. The game's premise is stated as "to win, player must proceed clockwise along the streets of New Orleans and get to the mansion with the key card in order to unlock the secret to Candyman's power".

== See also ==
- Race in horror films
