= Candyman (soundtrack) =

Candyman (Original Motion Picture Soundtrack)

Film score by Robert Aiki Aubrey Lowe
- Released: August 27, 2021
- Recorded: 2020–2021
- Genre: Film score
- Length: 72:56
- Label: Back Lot Music; Waxwork
- Producer: Robert Aiki Aubrey Lowe

Robert Aiki Aubrey Lowe chronology
Il colpo del cane (2019)	Candyman (2021)	Master (2022)

Singles from Candyman (Original Motion Picture Soundtrack)
- 1. "Rows and Towers" Released: August 17, 2021; 2. "The Sweet" Released: August 23, 2021

Candyman (Original Motion Picture Soundtrack) is the soundtrack to the 2021 film. Featuring the film's score composed by Lichens who was credited under his original name Robert Aiki Aubrey Lowe, the score consisted of vocal performances by the composer as well as acoustic instruments sampled and manipulated through recordings of various sounds at live locations. The album featured 34 tracks released on digital, CD and vinyl formats on August 27, 2021, through Back Lot Music and Waxwork Records.

== Development ==
Director Nia DaCosta wanted the film as well as the score to be distinguished from the original 1992 film, but also unique and surprising as Philip Glass' soundtrack to the film. Instead of collaborating with mainstream composers in Hollywood, she chose experimental musician Lichens (credited as Robert Aiki Aubrey Lowe) particularly because of his voice which was "so intense" and "on another level". In the early conversations, DaCosta discussed about capturing multiplicity of voices as Candyman was not about singular person but being a continuity of people and wanted to capture it in the score. Most of the vocals were performed by Lowe himself. In the recurring theme, "Rows and Towers", he stacked layers of his vocals on top of each other, serving as the theme for Cabrini-Green, the former public housing project in Chicago, the birthplace of Candyman. He wrote it "not even thinking about the city in a broader context [...] but really honing it into the multitude of humans and their histories inside of this particular location. I think that was, for me, what was most representational, and having that piece as all voices. You get these different qualities of voices, different registers of voices inside, because you do have that multiplicity there."

Lowe used his vocals, from low to high range from his diaphragm or the inside of throat or nasal cavity to produce different timbres. In a sequence, where Anthony (Yahya Abdul-Mateen II) sees his reflection in a mirror as Candyman, he performed 18 passes of various vocal tracks, sitting in an isolation booth in a studio. Lowe felt having a cacophony as there are multiple voices coming into Anthony's head, and felt important to have this cluster of sound, where the plays being multiphonic and multitimbral. The soundscape was filled with elements of what "one would think of as being in the realm of horror" but also influences avant-garde classical music where he performs them aleatorically.

Lowe recorded non-vocal sounds on location, included the buzzing of electrical boxes and insects around Chicago being sampled, and taped some lines of the cast speaking, and stretched and manipulated them into "an unrecognizable, freakishly skittering sound". His friend and composer Hildur Guðnadóttir performed cello as well as providing background vocals. Some of the acoustic instruments were coaxed with instruments like contrabass and violin bow, which is produced in a sound similar to hurdy-gurdy. The main title theme "Music Box" served as a nod to Glass, where the four main notes of the original theme "Helen's Theme/Music Box" played in an unchanged tempo with a pseudo-random movement, with Lowe incorporating contrabass notes in his front title. It was the last theme that he performed as "I wanted to make sure I established my own voice and built my own world so the score can breathe on its own as more of an organism inside of the film."

== Track listing ==
No.	Title	Length
1.	"Prologue"	1:42
2.	"The Sweet"	2:16
3.	"Troy Story"	2:24
4.	"Row Houses"	2:57
5.	"Graffiti"	0:55
6.	"Rows and Towers"	4:05
7.	"What's Candyman"	1:27
8.	"I Thought We Could (The Turn)"	3:07
9.	"Joke Summoning"	3:17
10.	"End of Clive and Jerrika"	2:59
11.	"Brianna Finds Bodies"	1:27
12.	"Brianna Mirror Dream"	1:30
13.	"Helen Lyle Recordings Library"	1:10
14.	"Elevator"	0:53
15.	"Frantic Painting"	0:58
16.	"You Should Say It"	1:26
17.	"End of Finley"	2:16
18.	"Genius Cycles, Pt. I"	1:19
19.	"Genius Cycles, Pt. II"	3:58
20.	"Brianna in the Studio"	1:37
21.	"The End of the Kids"	2:46
22.	"Anthony's Arm"	1:05
23.	"Got Taken"	2:27
24.	"Anthony Called to Row Houses"	0:51
25.	"Brianna Laundromat I"	1:41
26.	"Brianna Laundromat II"	1:25
27.	"Leaves a Stain"	3:31
28.	"William Chases Brianna"	1:31
29.	"End of Burke"	0:41
30.	"Brianna Says His Name"	7:09
31.	"Music Box (Reprised)"	4:59
32.	"Cabrini Walk (Bonus)"	1:07
33.	"Cabrini Walk II (Bonus II)"	1:01
34.	"The Bridge (Bonus)"	0:59
Total length:		72:56

== Reception ==
Charlie Bridgen of The Quietus wrote "It's always a challenge to talk about a score to a horror movie when you haven't seen the film, but the varied layers of Candyman make it fascinating to listen to. Yes, it's terrifying, but it's also beautiful and sad and challenging." Music critic Jonathan Broxton wrote "In the end, if you found yourself being fascinated by scores like Arrival or Chernobyl or Under the Skin, if you see depth and meaning in the gimmicks of recording the hums of electrical outlets, or if you prefer your film music to be almost entirely free of melody, harmony, narrative structure, and diverse human emotion, then Candyman might be your score of the year."

David Rooney of The Hollywood Reporter wrote "Composer Robert Aiki Aubrey Lowe’s textured music has its own atmospheric hold, mixing synth and strings with ambient drone and choral elements." Tim Grierson of Screen International called it as "quietly unnerving".

== Awards ==
The score briefly made the shortlist for the Best Original Score at the 94th Academy Awards, described by Variety as the "rare horror film" to compete for the list. However, it could not make the final list of nominations.

Award	Date of ceremony	Category	Recipient(s)	Result	Ref.
Austin Film Critics Association	January 11, 2022	Best Score	Robert Aiki Aubrey Lowe	Nominated	
Black Reel Awards	February 28, 2022	Outstanding Score	Robert Aiki Aubrey Lowe	Nominated	
