= Propaganda Films =

Film production company, founded 1986

- Type: Subsidiary
- Founded: 1986; 40 years ago
- Founders: Steve Golin; Sigurjón Sighvatsson; David Fincher; Nigel Dick; Dominic Sena; Greg Gold
- Defunct: November 8, 2001; 24 years ago
- Fate: Closed
- Successors: USA Films
- Headquarters: Los Angeles
- Products: Films; Television series; Music videos; Commercials
- Parent: PolyGram Filmed Entertainment (1991–1998); Universal Studios (1998–1999)

Propaganda Films (stylized as PЯOPAGAИDA FILMS) was a production company founded in Los Angeles in 1986 by American producer Steve Golin, Icelandic producer Sigurjón Sighvatsson, English director Nigel Dick, and American directors David Fincher, Dominic Sena, and Greg Gold. Noted for its television commercials and music videos, it grew to be responsible for almost a third of all music videos produced in the U.S. within four years of its creation.

== Founding and early work (1986–1990) ==
As the name suggests, the production company was founded with the intent to focus on the medium of films; those that Golin and Sighvatsson couldn't get enough financing and creative control for elsewhere. However, in order to create financial stability, the company focused on a base of music video production. The company also branched off into producing television commercials, which along with music videos were considered inherently lesser quality than films. Gold later commented:

We were the first company that wanted to apply the principals of the commercial industry to music videos... [and] we wanted to take the aesthetics of music videos and apply them to commercials.

In addition to revenue from music videos and commercials, Propaganda entered into a deal in 1988 with PolyGram which meant that the Dutch media company would pay for Propaganda's film costs in exchange for part of the film revenues. It was during this era that Propaganda made connections with the likes of David Lynch, who they hired to direct Wild at Heart. They also produced Lynch's television show Twin Peaks.

== PolyGram and decline (1991–2001) ==
The initial deal with PolyGram, which involved selling them 49% of Propaganda, was intended to bring about financial strength and expanded opportunities. However, Golin and the others realized they needed even more resources to continue making films.

Propaganda Films was fully acquired by PolyGram Filmed Entertainment in 1991. This brought a decrease in creative control, and the budget allocations for films were tightly scrutinized by PolyGram. Nigel Dick later said:

We wanted to do good work and spend a little of the budget, the markup, on a better director of photography or shooting five more rolls of film. When the PolyGram bean counters came in, we didn't get that. 'Where's the markup gone?' That's what we got.

The nineties saw Propaganda produce films of varying success, including Canadian Bacon, The Game, and Being John Malkovich.

They also continued producing popular commercials (such as the "Aaron Burr" Got Milk? commercial) and music videos for the likes of Madonna and Michael Jackson.

In 1998 PolyGram was sold to Seagram, which folded part of PolyGram into Universal and sold the commercial, music video, and management divisions of Propaganda to SCP Equity Partners. Its original version of the film division was sold to Barry Diller's USA Films, which soon subsequently folded.

The management division was subsequently sold to a group led by Sundance Group executive Gary Beer around the same time. The management division reopened a new version of its film division under the leadership of former Phoenix Pictures executive Rick Hess and Trevor Macy in late 1999. By 2000 Sighvatsson had left for Lakeshore Entertainment and Golin had founded Anonymous Content, who had a pact with USA Films, which was one of the companies the original film division of Propaganda had folded.

Around the same time, producer Paul Schiff joined the film division of the company. In 2000, the company had struck a deal with Mandolin Entertainment. Also that year, the company secured a deal with Constantin Film to make its joint production venture under the name ProCon Films, who was quickly folded in October 2001. The company went defunct on November 8, 2001, amidst a decline in the advertising business. Several members joined RAW Entertainment and Catch 23 Entertainment after the company folded, while member Rick Hees joined the Creative Artists Agency.

== Notable collaborators ==
- Boris Malagurski
- Vaughan Arnell
- Michael Bay
- Markus Blunder
- Paul Boyd
- Nick Brandt
- Albert Bravo
- Jhoan Camitz
- Peter Care
- John Dahl
- Devin DeHaven
- Nigel Dick
- David Fincher
- Antoine Fuqua
- Douglas Gayeton
- Greg Gold
- Michel Gondry
- Steve Hanft
- Spike Jonze
- David Kellogg
- Alek Keshishian
- Mark Kohr
- Christian Langlois
- John Lithgow
- David Lynch
- Pierre Winther
- Scott Marshall
- Michael Moore
- Jeffrey Obrow
- Willi Patterson
- Vadim Perelman
- Alex Proyas
- Paul Rachman
- Mark Romanek
- Stéphane Sednaoui
- Dominic Sena
- Zack Snyder
- Simon West
- Bobby Woods
- Gore Verbinski
- Nico Beyer
- Max and Dania

== Partial filmography ==
- P.I. Private Investigations (1987)
- The Blue Iguana (1988)
- Kill Me Again (1989)
- Fear, Anxiety & Depression (1989)
- Janet Jackson's Rhythm Nation 1814 (1989)
- Heat Wave (1990)
- Industrial Symphony No. 1: The Dream of the Brokenhearted (1990)
- Twin Peaks (TV series, 1990–1991, now owned by CBS Media Ventures)
- Daddy's Dyin': Who's Got the Will? (1990)
- Wild at Heart (1990)
- Beverly Hills, 90210 (TV series, 1990–2000, now owned by CBS Media Ventures)
- Salute Your Shorts (TV series, 1991–1992)
- The Idiot Box (TV series, 1991)
- Books: Feed Your Head (TV mini-series, 1991)
- Madonna: Truth or Dare (1991)
- A Climate for Killing (1991)
- Voices That Care (1991)
- The Pacific Century (TV mini-series, 1992)
- Ruby (1992)
- A Stranger Among Us (1992)
- A Year and a Half in the Life of Metallica (1992)
- Candyman (1992)
- Fallen Angels (TV series, 1993–1995)
- Hotel Room (TV mini-series, 1993)
- Tales of the City (TV mini-series, 1993)
- Route 66 (TV series, 1993)
- Red Rock West (1993)
- Kalifornia (1993)
- Dream Lover (1993)
- Dangerous: The Short Films (1993)
- S.F.W. (1994)
- Turbocharged Thunderbirds (TV series, 1994)
- Jason's Lyric (1994)
- Avalanche (1994)
- Dead Connection (1994)
- My So-Called Life (TV series, 1994–1995)
- Coldblooded (1995)
- The Interview (1995)
- Canadian Bacon (1995)
- Candyman: Farewell to the Flesh (1995)
- Lord of Illusions (1995)
- Barb Wire (1996)
- The Portrait of a Lady (1996)
- Sleepers (1996)
- Guy (1996)
- The Game (1997)
- Los Locos (1997)
- A Thousand Acres (1997)
- An American Werewolf in Paris (1997)
- More Tales of the City (TV miniseries, 1998)
- Your Friends & Neighbors (1998)
- Return to Paradise (1998)
- Thursday (1998)
- Being John Malkovich (1999)
- The Match (1999)
- Nurse Betty (2000)
- Bounce (2000)
- Woman on Top (2000)
- The Little Vampire (2000)
- Southlander (2001)
- Full Frontal (2002)
- Auto Focus (2002)
- The Badge (2002)
- Trapped (2002)
- Adaptation. (2002)
