= Sigurjón Sighvatsson =

Icelandic film producer and businessman (born 1952)

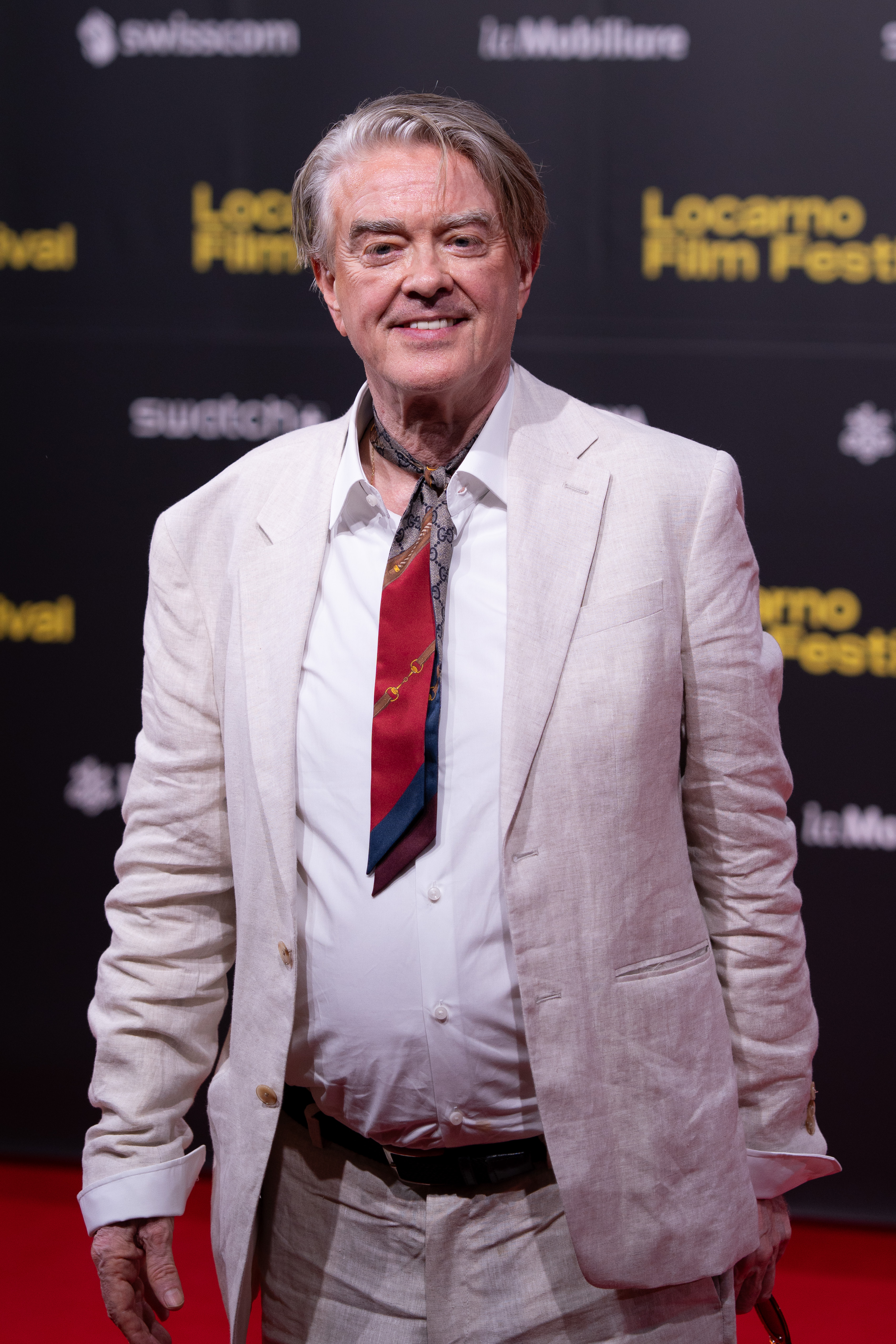
- Sighvatsson in 2026
- Born: 15 June 1952 (age 74); Reykjavík, Iceland
- Other name: Joni Sighvatsson
- Education: AFI Conservatory
- Occupations: Film producer, businessman

Sigurjón "Joni" Sighvatsson (born 15 June 1952) is an Icelandic film producer and businessman. He is the principal of Palomar Pictures, an independent production company, as well as chairman of Scandinavian film distributor/producer Scanbox Entertainment.

Sigurjón has worked with filmmakers including David Lynch, Kathryn Bigelow, Jim Sheridan, and Julian Schnabel. Among his films are The Hundred-Year-Old Man Who Climbed Out of the Window and Disappeared, Brothers, Z for Zachariah and Killer Elite, as well as Wild at Heart, Arlington Road and Basquiat.

Sigurjón has had influence in art films. He also produced Zidane: A 21st Century Portrait, as well as the controversial Destricted, a collection of short films by some of the world's leading artists focusing on the concept of pornography.

== Career ==
Before coming to the United States, Sigurjón enjoyed a successful career as a musician in his native Iceland, founding the country's first recording studio at the age of 21. After finishing a B.A. in Literature from the University of Iceland, Sighvatsson came to Los Angeles on a Fulbright Scholarship to earn his MFA in the Graduate Film Studies program at USC. He then was invited to and joined the Director's Program at the American Film Institute.

In 1986, Sigurjón co-founded Propaganda Films, which quickly became the leading music video and commercial production company in the world before expanding into feature films with Red Rock West, Kalifornia, and David Lynch's Wild At Heart which won the coveted Palme d'Or at the Cannes Film Festival. At Propaganda, Sighvatsson launched the careers of such directors as David Fincher, Michael Bay, and Spike Jonze.

Sigurjón has also been involved with numerous television shows, including the Emmy-nominated "Armistead Maupin's Tales of the City," the innovative cult classic "Twin Peaks," the triple ACE Award-winning anthology series "Fallen Angels," the quadruple ACE-winning "Heat Wave," as well as the popular original "Beverly Hills 90210". In 1995, Sigurjón became the founding president of Lakeshore Entertainment, where he produced or executive produced films such as Polish Wedding, 200 Cigarettes and Arlington Road.

In 1999, Sigurjón became the controlling shareholder in Palomar Pictures, another pioneer in music videos and television commercials and cultivated a new generation of top directors including Joseph Kahn, Gary McKendry and Marcos Siega. In 2006 Sigurjón acquired Scanbox Entertainment, a leading Scandinavian film distributor as well as heritage clothing company 66 North in Iceland, which he built into an award winning international outdoor brand.

Sigurjón has served in various industry and civic organizations including, as president of the American Cinematheque in Los Angeles, and as a board member of the AICP (Association of Independent Commercial Producers), The American-Scandinavian Foundation, the ACLU of Southern California, the Ocean Park Community Center, and currently serves on the Hammer Museum Board of Overseers. Sigurjón is also the Honorary Consul General for Iceland in Southern California.

== Producer selected filmography ==
He was a producer in all films unless otherwise noted.

=== Film ===
Year	Film	Credit	Notes
1985	Hard Rock Zombies	Associate producer	
1985	American Drive-In	Associate producer	
1987	Aria	Associate producer	
1987	P.I. Private Investigations		
1988	The Blue Iguana		
1989	Kill Me Again		
1989	Fear, Anxiety & Depression		
1990	Daddy's Dyin': Who's Got the Will?		
1990	Wild at Heart		
1990	Rust		
1992	Ruby		
1992	A Stranger Among Us		
1992	Candyman		
1993	Behind Schedule	Associate producer	
1993	Red Rock West		
1993	Kalifornia		
1993	Dream Lover		
1994	Final Combination	Executive producer	
1994	Gospel According to Harry	Executive producer	
1994	A Pig's Tale	Executive producer	Direct-to-video
1994	S.F.W.	Executive producer	
1995	Candyman: Farewell to the Flesh		
1995	Canadian Bacon	Executive producer	
1995	Lord of Illusions	Executive producer	
1996	Kids in the Hall: Brain Candy	Executive producer	
1996	Basquiat		
1996	Box of Moonlight	Executive producer	
1997	Going All the Way		
1997	'Til There Was You	Executive producer	
1997	The Real Blonde	Executive producer	
1997	A Thousand Acres		
1998	Polish Wedding	Executive producer	
1998	Homegrown	Executive producer	
1998	Phoenix	Executive producer	
1999	200 Cigarettes	Executive producer	
1999	Arlington Road	Executive producer	
2000	Passion of Mind	Executive producer	
2000	The Weight of Water		
2002	K-19: The Widowmaker		
2005	Pretty Persuasion	Executive producer	
2005	A Little Trip to Heaven		
2006	Destricted	Executive producer	
2006	The Last Winter	Executive producer	
2009	Valhalla Rising	Executive producer	
2009	The Good Heart	Executive producer	
2009	Brothers		
2011	Killer Elite		
2013	The Hundred-Year-Old Man Who Climbed Out of the Window and Disappeared	Executive producer	
2015	Z for Zachariah		
2016	I.T.	Co-producer	
2017	Wind River	Executive producer	
2017	I Remember You		
2018	Isabelle	Executive producer	
2019	End of Sentence		

Production manager

Year	Film	Role
1984	Nickel Mountain	Post-production supervisor

Thanks

Year	Film	Role
2013	Parkland	The producers wish to thank

=== Television ===
Year	Title	Credit	Notes
1987	Richard Marx Live	Executive producer	Television special
1990	Heat Wave	Executive producer	Television film
1990	Industrial Symphony No. 1	Executive producer	Television film
1990	Salute Your Shorts	Executive producer	Television pilot
1990−91	Beverly Hills, 90210		
1991	Coca-Cola Pop Music Backstage Pass to Summer	Co-executive producer	Television special
1992	Memphis	Executive producer	Television film
1993	Harlow: The Blonde Bombshell	Executive producer	Documentary
1993	Tales of the City	Executive producer	
