= Candyman 3: Day of the Dead =

1999 film by Turi Meyer

- Promotional release poster
- Directed by: Turi Meyer
- Written by: Al Septien; Turi Meyer
- Based on: Characters by Clive Barker
- Produced by: Al Septien; William Stuart
- Starring: Tony Todd; Donna D'Errico; Jsu Garcia; Wade Williams; Alexia Robinson; Lupe Ontiveros
- Cinematography: Michael G. Wojciechowski
- Edited by: Frederick Wardell
- Music by: Adam Gorgoni
- Production company: Aurora Productions
- Distributed by: Artisan Entertainment
- Release date: July 9, 1999
- Running time: 93 minutes
- Country: United States
- Language: English
- Budget: $1 million

Candyman 3: Day of the Dead (titled onscreen as simply Candyman: Day of the Dead) is a 1999 American supernatural horror film directed by Turi Meyer and starring Tony Todd and Donna D'Errico. It is the third installment in the Candyman series, and a direct sequel to the 1995 film Candyman: Farewell to the Flesh. Its plot follows Caroline, the daughter of Annie Tarrant and a descendant of Candyman, the powerful spirit of Daniel Robitaille, the murdered son of a slave who kills those who invoke him. Caroline finds herself targeted by Candyman on the eve of the Day of the Dead.

Unlike the first two installments, the film did not get a theatrical release and was instead released direct-to-video by Artisan Entertainment on July 9, 1999. It was followed by a fourth film in 2021, titled Candyman, a direct sequel to the original 1992 film set between the events of Farewell to the Flesh and Day of the Dead, which returns the storyline to Chicago, Illinois.

== Plot ==
Years after the events of the second film in 1995, a Candyman-themed gallery event hosted by artist Miguel Velasco in Los Angeles is attended by Caroline McKeever, daughter of Annie Tarrant and Paul McKeever from the second film and a direct descendant of Candyman. Caroline summons Candyman by saying his name five times in a mirror. Shortly afterwards, Candyman kills Miguel and his lover Lina with his hooked hand.

Miguel's gallery is broken into by a local gang who steals Candyman's paintings. Caroline talks with her roommate Tamara about Candyman. It is revealed via flashback that Candyman killed Caroline's dementia-ridden mother while she was taking a bath by slitting her throat with his hook. Annie summoned him and her death was believed to be suicide. A couple hours beforehand when last seeing her mother alive, Annie had told Caroline to 'destroy the myth'.

The murders are pinned on David de la Paz, a friend of Miguel's who soon gets acquainted with Caroline. After envisioning Candyman and the ghost of her mother in a diner bathroom, she comes clean to David about her history. He takes her to see his grandmother, a psychic healer, who informs Caroline that she must destroy the good part of Candyman in order to eliminate the evil. She shows Caroline visions that the good part of Candyman lies within his paintings. Afterwards, Candyman kidnaps David and keeps him in an unknown building swinging from hooks pierced into his back.

After Candyman kills Tamara, Caroline is taken in for questioning. A seasoned police detective named L.V. Sacco is murdered by Candyman while Caroline is in the car, which both brings her heat from the local authorities and earns her hate from Sacco's partner Lt. Det. Samuel Deacon Kraft, who had no intention of bringing her in alive. When Caroline goes to an abandoned building to retrieve the paintings from the gang who stole them from Miguel's gallery, she is captured by them and knocked out. She awakens tied to a chair and gagged. The gang summons Candyman in hopes of sacrificing Caroline but Candyman kills the entire gang instead.

Caroline explores the building and finds David alive, but injured. Candyman suddenly appears and attempts to convince her to give her life to him. However, Caroline destroys a portrait of him with a hook, which causes a similar wound to appear on him. She slips and causes a candle to light the painting on fire, causing Candyman to burst into flames. Caroline frees David, but is attacked by Det. Kraft, who tries to kill her with a hook. He is shot in the back of the head by Det. Jamal Matthews, who was following Kraft. Before he dies, Kraft gasps out "Candyman”. Caroline remembers her mother's advice to 'destroy the myth', and tells Matthews that Kraft was Candyman this whole time.

After the news is released that Kraft was Candyman, Caroline states, "There was no such thing as Candyman" in front of a mirror to ensure he is dead. Candyman's hook bursts through the mirror, but is then revealed to be just a nightmare. Caroline has a picnic with David and his daughter Cristina in front of Annie's grave as the Day of the Dead celebrations continue. She is finally happy, convinced Candyman no longer exists.

== Cast ==
- Tony Todd as Candyman / Daniel Robitaille
- Donna D'Errico as Caroline McKeever
- Nick Corri as David De La Paz
- Ernie Hudson Jr. as Detective Jamal Matthews
- Wade Williams as Lieutenant Samuel Deacon Kraft
- Robert O'Reilly as Detective L.V. Sacco
- Lombardo Boyar as Enrique
- Lupe Ontiveros as Abuela
- Lillian Hurst as Flower Seller
- Elizabeth Guber as Detective Jamie Gold
- Mark Adair-Rios as Miguel Velasco
- Nicole Contreras as Cristina De La Paz
- Rena Riffel as Lina
- Mike Moroff as Tino
- Chris Van Dahl as Dante
- Alexia Robinson as Tamara
- Elizabeth Hayes as Annie Tarrant
- Laura Mazur as Caroline Sullivan
- Jud Meyers as Fitz
- Leonardo Guerra as Little Boy

== Production ==
According to the audio commentary, filming took place in Boyle Heights, Eastside Los Angeles over a period of 18 days, with an additional two to three days spent on second unit shots. This meant the actors had only a maximum of two takes before they moved on to another scene. The budget was closer to $1 million instead of $3 million.

Production rehired Norman Gary to handle the bees, as he did on the previous two films. It was originally believed that rehiring him would be too expensive, but Gary’s desire to remain with the franchise caused him to reduce his fee. The graffiti on the subway walls was done by real graffiti artists. Crew members caught a group of them tagging in the area near production and offered each $100 to do the same type of artwork on their subway set. Composer Adam Gorgoni had intended to use themes from the previous two films but was forced to create an entirely new score when the production was not given permission to use any music from Philip Glass.

After filming was completed, there was no money left for an opening credits sequence, and the production company told the director to just play the credits over the opening dream sequence. Wanting something more cinematic, the cinematographer and director worked together to find extra equipment and leftover film rolls from principal photography. They blacked out the windows of a garage and, using Candyman's hook prop, filmed an opening credits sequence at no extra cost.

== Reception ==
=== Critical response ===
On Rotten Tomatoes the film holds a 7% approval rating based on 14 reviews, with an average score of 3.40/10.

In 2008, Tony Todd admitted he considers Day of the Dead a poor entry in the Candyman series during one of Fangoria's Weekend of Horrors conventions.

== Sequel ==
In the 2004 interview for Fangoria, Tony Todd said that a fourth Candyman film was being prepared, with a $25 million budget. Todd and Clive Barker discussed storyboarding ideas during the crew's meetings. The sequel was meant to be Winter-set, with action taking place in a New England woman's college. It was cancelled most likely because of the problems with "determining who owns the Candyman franchise".

Deon Taylor was linked to the project at one point, according to Todd. In the interview with Bloody Disgusting Todd elaborated:

"(...) I had an idea that they liked, initially. It was going to take place in New England during a snow storm, because I just had this image of Candyman in a blizzard. Because I'm from New England, and I knew the power of having that mythic character in a snowstorm being undeterred by the elements. We had gone so far as to establish him as a professor at a girls' college."

In September 2018, it was announced that Jordan Peele was in talks to produce a sequel through his Monkeypaw Productions which Todd stated in a 2018 interview with Nightmare on Film Street, "I would rather have him do it with someone with intelligence who was going to be thoughtful and dig into the whole racial makeup of who the Candyman was and why he existed in the first place." In November 2018, it was confirmed that Peele would produce the film with Universal and MGM and would partner with Win Rosenfeld to co-produce the film while Nia DaCosta signed on as director. The film would take place back in the new gentrified Cabrini Green where the old housing projects development stood in Chicago once. The filming was due to commence in the spring of 2019.

In January 2019, it was reported that Lakeith Stanfield would possibly star in the film as an older version of Anthony McCoy who took an interest on by seeking the legend of the Candyman which was similar to Helen Lyle's character that was played by Virginia Madsen. In February 2019, Yahya Abdul-Mateen II was in talks to play McCoy. He was initially misreported as being in talks to portray the titular character. In response to the news, Todd offered his blessings over Twitter by stating: "Cheers to the Candyman who was a wonderful character that I lived with for 25 years. He brought grace and glory and a beautiful boatload of friends and family. I am honored that the spirit of Daniel Robitaille and Cabrini Green rose again. Truth to power! Blessings to the cast and the crew". However, it was ultimately announced that Todd would reprise his role. The film was released on August 27, 2021, and set in 2019, one year before the events of Day of the Dead.

== Sources ==
- Thompson, Kirsten Moana (2012). Apocalyptic Dread: American Film at the Turn of the Millennium. SUNY Press. ISBN 978-0-791-47044-2.
