= Michael Culkin =

British actor

- Born: 2 July 1954 (age 72); London, England
- Occupation: Actor
- Years active: 1973–present
- Website: www.michaelculkin.com

Michael Culkin (born 2 July 1954) is an English theatre, film, and television actor best known for his role as Judge Buller in the BBC drama Garrow's Law. He appeared as Rab Butler in the first two seasons of The Crown, in The Iron Lady with Meryl Streep, opposite Johnny Depp in Mortdecai and with Hugh Grant in A Very English Scandal playing the Conservative politician Reginald Maudling. He appeared in two seasons of Poldark as Horace Treneglos. He has extensive BBC and ITV Television credits as well as work at the National Theatre and in the West End where he starred with Maggie Smith in Alan Bennett's The Lady in the Van. He is unmarried and lives in Thaxted, Essex, London and Norfolk with several dogs and a llama. He is a member of the British Academy of Film and Television Arts.

== Selected filmography ==
Year	Title	Role	Notes
1992	Candyman	Phillip Purcell	
1994	Immortal Beloved	Jakob Hotscevar	
1995	Candyman: Farewell to the Flesh	Phillip Purcell	
1996	Cold Lazarus	Inspector Challender	1 episode
1997	Kavanagh QC	Arnold Westrode	Episode "Ancient History"
1997	Highlander	Bernie Crimmins	Episode "The Stone of Scone"
1997	Into the Blue	Rex Cunningham	TV film
1997	Soloman	Hiram of Naphtali	TV film
1998	Our Mutual Friend	Mr Veneering	TV mini series
1998	Killer Net	Justin Holloway	TV mini series
1998	Supply and Demand	Sir Phillip Saville	TV mini series
1998	Inspector Morse	Mr Sergeant Williams	Episode "The Wench is Dead"
1999	Queer as Folk	Martin Brooks	1 episode
1999	Candyman: Day of the Dead	Phillip Purcell	
2000	Don Quixote	1st monk	TV film
2001	Perfect Strangers	Sidney	TV series
2001	Queen of Swords	Edward Wellesley	Episode "The Emissary"
2002	Shackleton	Jack Morgan	TV film
2002	Relic Hunter	Winston Hubbard	Episode "Arthur's Cross"
2003	In Deep	Hazlitt	Episode "Full Disclosure"
2004	La Femme Musketeer	Claude	TV film
2004	Murder City	Carl McCready	Episode "Under the Skin"
2004	The Inspector Lynley Mysteries	Raphael	Episode "A Traitor to Memory"
2005	Empire	Lucius	TV mini series
2005	Rome	Presiding magistrate	Episode "The Spoils"
2008	Trial & Retribution	Judge	Episode "Conviction
2009	Runaway	Edward	TV miniseries
2009	Garrow's Law	Judge Buller	TV series
2010	M.I. High	Mr Pronting	Episode "Millionaire Flatley
2010	Doctors	Hugo Blandford	2 episodes
2012	Downton Abbey	Archbishop of York	2 episodes
2013	Justin and the Knights of Valour	Sebastian	Voice
2014	Law & Order: UK	Mr Justice Lockwood	Episode: "Flaw"
2015	Father Brown	Dr Barashi	Episode 3.8: "The Lair of the Libertines"
2015	Poldark	Horace Treneglos	TV series
2016	Jericho	Mr Claybourn	TV series
2016	The Crown	Rab Butler	TV series
2016	The Coroner	Charles Gower	Episode 2.2 "Perfectly Formed"
2018	Holmes & Watson	The Judge	
2026	Pretty Lethal	Lothar Marcovic	
