= Steve Golin =

American film and television producer (1955–2019)

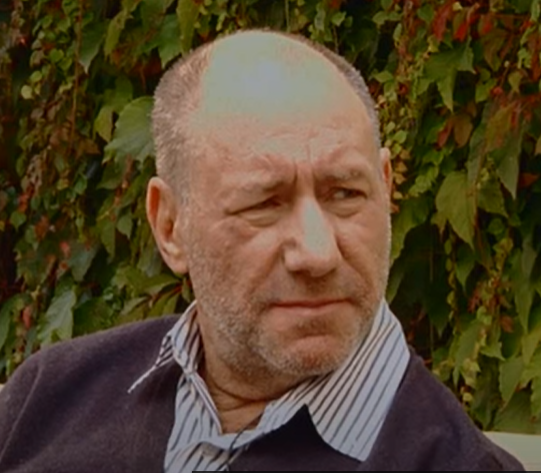
- Golin in 2015
- Born: March 6, 1955; Geneva, New York, U.S.
- Died: April 21, 2019 (aged 64); Los Angeles, California, U.S.
- Education: AFI Conservatory
- Occupation: Film producer
- Children: 2

Steven Aaron Golin (March 6, 1955 – April 21, 2019) was an American film and television producer and the founder and CEO of Anonymous Content LLP, a multimedia development, production and talent management company and co-founder and CEO of Propaganda Films. Golin graduated from the Tisch School of the Arts at New York University in 1976 and attended the AFI Conservatory. He won Best Picture at the 2016 Academy Awards for Spotlight.

== Career ==
=== Propaganda Films ===
Golin and partner Joni Sighvatsson launched Propaganda Films, a talent management, advertising, and video production company, in 1986. They built Propaganda into the largest music video and commercial production company in the world, winning more MTV Video Awards and Cannes Palme d'Or Awards than any other company and quickly became a home for the most sought-after young music video and commercial directors. One of its first discoveries was David Fincher, then an unknown video director. Not long afterward, a young filmmaker showed up with a reel containing a Donny Osmond video and a spec Coke commercial. Golin watched the clips and told Michael Bay, "Nice to meet you. You're hired." After seeing a couple of skateboard videos he liked, Golin brought Spike Jonze into the fold. Other discoveries included Antoine Fuqua, Gore Verbinski, and Alex Proyas. Golin and Sighvatsson sold the company to PolyGram, but when PolyGram was sold to Seagram in 1998, Golin lost control of the company and exited in 1999.

=== Anonymous Content ===
Golin's next company, Anonymous Content, located in Culver City, California, was launched in early 2000. Golin has guided the company's commercial division to become one of the top commercial production entities in the industry, producing spots and campaigns for Audi, Citibank, Coca-Cola, Ford, Intel, Nike, Pepsi, United Airlines, and others. Its music video division, which earned Best New Artist Clip (Hard Rock category) at the 2000 Billboard Music Video Awards for A Perfect Circle's "Judith" (2000), directed by David Fincher, has also produced projects for Cypress Hill, Filter, Smashmouth, Third Eye Blind, and The Wallflowers, among other artists. Under Golin's leadership, the company's management division has grown to represent more than 50 writers, directors, and actors. Fincher also worked with the company to produce "The Hire", a series of adverts for BMW, which were only available online.

Golin has also produced a number of feature films and television shows, some of which were produced with Anonymous Content and others through Propaganda Films. These include David Fincher's The Game (1997), Spike Jonze's Being John Malkovich (1999), Michel Gondry's Eternal Sunshine of the Spotless Mind (2004), Alejandro González Iñárritu's Babel (2006), and Gavin Hood's Rendition (2007), Nic Pizzolatto's True Detective (2014), Sam Esmail's Mr. Robot (2015) and Tom McCarthy's Spotlight (2015).

Golin received Academy Award nominations for Best Picture for producing Babel, The Revenant, and Spotlight, the latter of which won the Academy Award for Best Picture.

== Personal life ==
Golin was Jewish and had two children, Ari and Anna. He initially was a cancer survivor. However, Golin died of Ewing's sarcoma on April 21, 2019, at the age of 64.

== Filmography ==
=== Producer ===
- Nickel Mountain (1984) (line producer)
- Hard Rock Zombies (1985) (associate producer)
- American Drive-In (1985) (associate producer)
- P.I. Private Investigations (1987)
- The Blue Iguana (1988)
- Kill Me Again (1989)
- Fear, Anxiety & Depression (1989)
- Daddy's Dyin': Who's Got the Will? (1990)
- Salute Your Shorts (pilot, 1990)
- Wild at Heart (1990)
- In Bed with Madonna (documentary, 1991) (supervising producer)
- Ruby (1992)
- A Stranger Among Us (1992)
- Candyman (1992)
- Red Rock West (1993)
- Kalifornia (1993)
- Final Combination (1994)
- Sleepers (1996)
- The Portrait of a Lady (1996)
- The Game (1997)
- A Thousand Acres (1997)
- Return to Paradise (1998)
- Your Friends & Neighbors (1998)
- Being John Malkovich (1999)
- Nurse Betty (2000)
- Bounce (2000)
- 50 First Dates (2004)
- Eternal Sunshine of the Spotless Mind (2004)
- Babel (2006)
- Smiley Face (2007)
- In the Land of Women (2007)
- Rendition (2007)
- Cleaner (2007)
- Married Life (2007)
- All God's Children Can Dance (2008)
- Case 39 (2009)
- 44 Inch Chest (2009)
- The Lazarus Effect (documentary, 2010)
- The Beaver (2011)
- The Last Elvis (2012)
- Big Miracle (2012)
- Seeking a Friend for the End of the World (2012)
- Breakup at a Wedding (2013)
- Uwantme2killhim? (2013)
- The Fifth Estate (2013)
- Laggies (2014)
- Spotlight (2015)
- The Revenant (2015)
- Bastille Day (2016)
- Don't Worry, He Won't Get Far on Foot (2018)
- Boy Erased (2018)
- The Beach Bum (2019)
- Stillwater (2021)

=== Executive producer ===
- Industrial Symphony No. 1: The Dream of the Brokenhearted (video, 1990)
- Dream Lover (1993)
- A Pig's Tale (video, 1994)
- Lord of Illusions (1995)
- The Match (1999)
- Searching for the Wrong-Eyed Jesus (documentary, 2003)
- Lake of Fire (documentary, 2006)
- Girl Most Likely (2012)
- Little Red Wagon (2012)
- Fun Size (2012)
- Comet (2014)
- The Loft (2014)
- The Age of Adaline (2015)
- Len and Company (2015)
- The Meddler (2015)
- Triple 9 (2016)
- Outlaw King (2018)

==== Television ====
- Heat Wave (1990)
- Memphis (1992)
- Harlow: The Blonde Bombshell (documentary, 1993)
- Due East (2002)
- The L Word (2004)
- True Detective (2014–2019)
- Mr. Robot (2015–2019)
- Quarry (2016)
- Berlin Station (2016–2018)
- 13 Reasons Why (2017–2020)
- The Alienist (2018)
- Flint Town (2018)
- Catch-22 (2019)
- Shantaram (2022)
- Disclaimer (2024)
