= Candyman (2021 film) =

Film by Nia DaCosta

- Theatrical release poster
- Directed by: Nia DaCosta
- Screenplay by: Jordan Peele; Win Rosenfeld; Nia DaCosta
- Based on: Candyman by Bernard Rose; "The Forbidden" by Clive Barker
- Produced by: Jordan Peele; Win Rosenfeld; Ian Cooper
- Starring: Yahya Abdul-Mateen II; Teyonah Parris; Nathan Stewart-Jarrett; Colman Domingo
- Cinematography: John Guleserian
- Edited by: Catrin Hedström
- Music by: Robert Aiki Aubrey Lowe
- Production companies: Metro-Goldwyn-Mayer Pictures; Monkeypaw Productions
- Distributed by: Universal Pictures
- Release date: August 27, 2021
- Running time: 91 minutes
- Countries: United States; Canada
- Language: English
- Budget: $25 million
- Box office: $77.4 million

Candyman is a 2021 supernatural horror film directed by Nia DaCosta, who co-wrote the screenplay with Jordan Peele and Win Rosenfeld. It is a direct sequel to the 1992 film and the fourth film in the Candyman film series, based on the short story "The Forbidden" by English author Clive Barker, and set between the films Candyman: Farewell to the Flesh (1995) and Candyman 3: Day of the Dead (1999). The film stars Yahya Abdul-Mateen II, Teyonah Parris, Nathan Stewart-Jarrett, and Colman Domingo. Vanessa Williams, Virginia Madsen, and Tony Todd reprise their roles from the original film.

Plans for another Candyman film began in the early 2000s, with original director Bernard Rose wanting to make a prequel film about Candyman and Helen's love. However, the studio turned it down and the project entered development hell. By 2018, Peele signed on as producer for a new film using his company Monkeypaw Productions. In November that same year, Universal Pictures and Metro-Goldwyn-Mayer Pictures became involved, and it was confirmed that Peele would produce the film with Rosenfeld, while DaCosta signed on as director. Principal photography for the film began in August 2019 and wrapped in September 2019 in Chicago, Illinois.

Candyman was theatrically released in the United States on August 27, 2021, by Universal Pictures. Its release date was delayed three times from an original June 2020 date due to concerns regarding the COVID-19 pandemic. The film received generally positive reviews from critics, who praised DaCosta's direction, visual style, and the blend of social commentary with horror. It grossed $77 million worldwide against a $25 million budget.

== Plot ==
In 1977, at Chicago's Cabrini–Green housing projects, a young boy witnesses the killing of Sherman Fields, a homeless African American man with a hook for a hand. Suspected of giving a white child a razor blade in a piece of candy, Sherman is beaten to death by police but later proven innocent when more cases of razor blades in candies come up.

In 2019, artist Anthony McCoy lives in Chicago with his girlfriend, gallery director Brianna Cartwright. Seeking inspiration, Anthony explores the projects after Brianna's brother Troy and his boyfriend tell them the story of Helen Lyle, who is believed responsible for a killing spree and briefly kidnapping a baby in Cabrini-Green. Stung on the hand by a bee, Anthony meets laundromat owner William Burke, the boy who witnessed Sherman's death. William introduces him to the urban legend of the Candyman, which Anthony tells Brianna and jokingly performs its curse: by saying "Candyman" five times to a mirror, Sherman's spirit will appear and kill the summoner.

Inspired by Sherman's death and the Candyman legend, Anthony creates an elaborate art piece titled "Say My Name" for a show curated by Brianna and her colleague Clive, but his work is disparaged by critic Finley Stephens and other attendees. Later that night, Clive and his girlfriend Jerrica unwittingly summon the Candyman, who brutally murders them; Brianna discovers their bodies, triggering childhood memories of witnessing her father's suicide.

Anthony compulsively paints gruesome portraits of unknown men, becoming obsessed as he investigates Helen Lyle and her own Candyman research, and has a vision of Sherman's ghost in an elevator. Interviewed by Finley, Anthony goads her into summoning the Candyman herself, and has another vision in a mirror of himself as Sherman. Joining Brianna at a business dinner, he leaves abruptly when he learns Finley has been murdered.

Anthony goes to William, who explains that the legend originated in the 1890s with Daniel Robitaille, an artist who had an interracial affair with a white client's daughter. After the daughter claimed Robitaille raped her, he was mutilated and burnt alive. The legend has been renewed for generations with the souls of other murdered innocent black men joining the Candyman "hive"; these are the subjects of Anthony's paintings. Anthony attempts to protect Brianna, but only frightens her with his increasingly erratic behavior.

Meanwhile, a female teenager, who previously attended Anthony's show with her parents, and her friends are killed after summoning the Candyman in their school bathroom, with one of their classmates, who wasn't involved in the summoning, having arrived after and survived. Anthony undergoes a physical transformation, spreading from the bee sting on his hand across his entire body. He confronts his mother, Anne-Marie, after visiting a hospital and learning that she lied to him: he was born near Cabrini-Green, and was the baby taken the night Helen died. Anne-Marie admits the Candyman was responsible for the bloodshed blamed on Helen, and the community vowed never to speak his name.

Brianna seeks out William, who abducts her to an abandoned church, where Anthony is in a fugue state. Shortly after Sherman's death, William witnessed his return as the Candyman when his sister and her friend summoned him and were killed. William plans to resurrect the Candyman "hive" as a form of retaliation against gentrifiers. Sawing off Anthony's hand and replacing it with a hook, William calls the police to have Anthony wrongfully gunned down as another vengeful spirit to join the hive. Chased into the Cabrini-Green row houses, Brianna stabs William to death with a pen. She is confronted by Anthony, who collapses in her arms and is shot dead by the police.

Detaining Brianna in the backseat of a car, the police try to intimidate her into agreeing that Anthony was the killer and that his shooting was justified. Instead, she uses the rearview mirror to summon the Candyman, who appears as Anthony and massacres the police. Swarming with bees, his face transforms to Daniel Robitaille, instructing Brianna to "tell everyone" what she has witnessed, as more police officers arrive.

The film's end credits feature a shadow puppet montage of members of the growing Candyman hive, including Daniel, Sherman, Anthony Crawford, James Byrd Jr., George Stinney, and Anthony himself.

== Cast ==
- Yahya Abdul-Mateen II as Anthony McCoy, a visual artist who becomes obsessed with the Candyman's legend.
- Teyonah Parris as Brianna "Bri" Cartwright, Anthony's girlfriend and an art gallery director.
  - Hannah Love Jones as young Brianna.
- Colman Domingo as William "Billy" Burke, a Cabrini–Green resident who tells Anthony about the Candyman's legend.
  - Rodney L. Jones III as young Billy.
- Nathan Stewart-Jarrett as Troy Cartwright, Brianna's brother and boyfriend of Grady Greenberg.
- Kyle Kaminsky as Grady Greenberg, Troy's boyfriend.
- Vanessa Williams as Anne-Marie McCoy, Anthony's estranged mother who believed in the Candyman legend while living in Cabrini–Green. Years ago, she shared her experience of fearing him to Helen Lyle.
- Rebecca Spence as Finley Stephens, an art critic.
- Brian King as Clive Privler, an art dealer.
- Miriam Moss as Jerrica Cooper, Clive's girlfriend.
- Michael Hargrove as Sherman Fields, a hook-handed man who was killed by racist police officers in 1977 after being falsely accused of planting razorblades in candy.
- Carl Clemons-Hopkins as Jameson
- Christiana Clark as Danielle Harrington
- Heidi Grace Engerman as Haley Gulick
- Breanna Lind as Annika
- Torrey Hanson as Jack Hyde
- Cedric Mays as Gil Cartwright
- Nancy Pender as TV News Anchor
- Pam Jones as Devlin Sharpe
- Virginia Madsen as Helen Lyle (voice and archive image), a graduate student who was able to defeat the Candyman after sacrificing herself years ago.
- Tony Todd as Candyman / Daniel Robitaille, a vengeful spirit and originator of the Candyman legend who was killed as the result of an interracial love affair during the late 19th century. He now appears when someone summons him by saying his name five times while facing a mirror. This film would mark Todd's final appearance as the original version of the character prior to his death in 2024.

== Production ==
=== Development ===
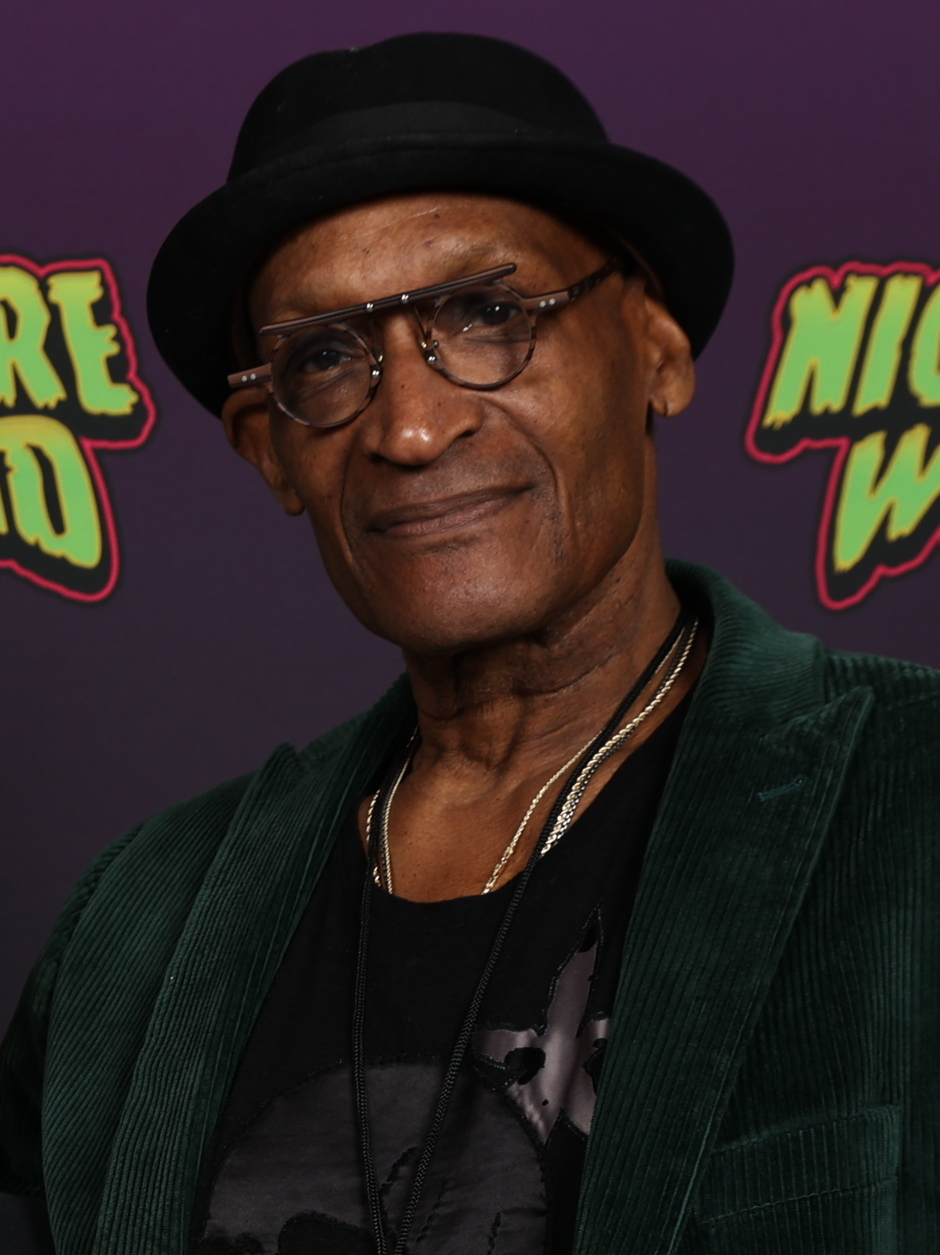
Tony Todd reprises his roles as Daniel Robitaille / Candyman in the new film.

In the early 2000s, director Bernard Rose was interested in making a prequel film to Candyman (1992) about Candyman and Helen's love, although the idea was rejected by the studio. Later, in response to the success of Freddy vs. Jason (2003), a crossover film between the Candyman and the Leprechaun film series, titled Candyman vs. Leprechaun, entered development. Tony Todd rejected the idea after being presented the script, saying "I will never be involved in something like that." In 2004, Todd confirmed to Fangoria that a fourth film was moving forward with Clive Barker's involvement and a $25 million budget. By 2009, Deon Taylor was attached to direct the film, which would have been set in New England during the winter at an all-women's college, and would ignore the events of Candyman 3: Day of the Dead (1999). The film eventually fell apart due to disputes amongst the rights owners.

In September 2018, it was announced that Jordan Peele was in talks to produce a remake of Candyman through his Monkeypaw Productions banner. In a 2018 interview with Nightmare on Film Street, Todd stated, "I'd rather have him do it, someone with intelligence who's going to be thoughtful and dig into the whole racial makeup of who the Candyman is and why he existed in the first place." In November 2018, it was confirmed that Peele and Win Rosenfeld would produce the film for Monkeypaw with Metro-Goldwyn-Mayer Pictures, while Nia DaCosta signed on as director, and Universal Pictures distributing; the film would be clarified to be a "spiritual sequel" to the 1992 film. Additionally, it would be taking place back in the new gentrified Cabrini–Green where the old housing projects development once stood in Chicago. MGM's Jonathan Glickman stated that "the story will not only pay reverence to Clive Barker's haunting and brilliant source material" but "will bring in a new generation of fans." Filming was due to commence in early 2019.

=== Pre-production ===
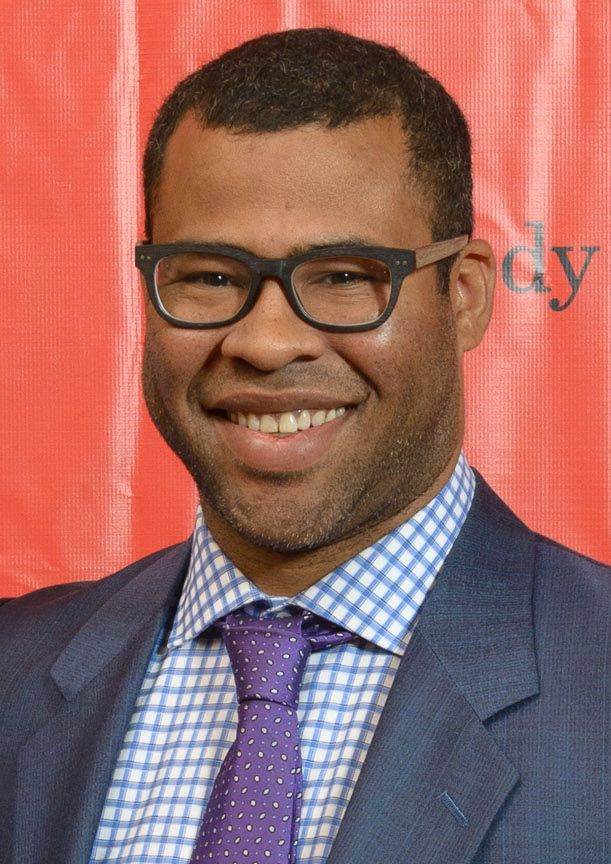
Jordan Peele serves as a producer for the film under Monkeypaw Productions.

In January 2019, it was reported that Lakeith Stanfield was being eyed to star in the film as Anthony McCoy, a character who was portrayed as a baby in the original film by Lanesha Martin. At the time, there was no word as to whether Todd or any of past cast would reprise their roles. However, in an interview with Entertainment Weekly, Todd spoke about Peele, stating: "I know that he's a fan. I'm hoping that I will appear in the film in some form of fashion. Wouldn't that make sense? But, it's Hollywood so I won't take it personally if it doesn't work out." He added, "If this new one is successful, it will shed light back on the original. I think that the subject matter is more important than any individuals and I mean that."

In February 2019, Yahya Abdul-Mateen II was in talks to play McCoy, misreported as being in talks to portray the titular character. In response to the news, Todd offered his blessings over Twitter, stating: "Cheers to the Candyman, a wonderful character that I lived with for 25 years. He's brought grace and glory and a beautiful boatload of friends & family. I'm honored that the spirit of Daniel Robitaille & Cabrini–Green rises again. Truth to power! Blessings to the cast & crew". However, it was ultimately announced that Todd would reprise his role and that Abdul-Mateen II would instead be portraying Anthony McCoy. In March, Teyonah Parris was cast as Brianna Cartwright. That same month, Robert Aiki Aubrey Lowe was announced to be scoring the film.

=== Filming ===
Principal photography for Candyman took place between August and September 2019 in the Chicago area under the working title Say My Name. Some filming took place in the North Park neighborhood during the month of September. Director DaCosta said the Near North Side's Marina City apartment buildings/condos were her favorite filming location in the city. Several scenes were filmed in the last standing remains of Cabrini–Green Homes' fenced-off row houses from 1942. Candyman is the first feature film to shoot on location inside the Museum of Contemporary Art, Chicago. Like the originally-planned 2004 film, the project had a $25 million production budget.

The film features puppetry animation sequences which were created by Chicago-based puppet theater company Manual Cinema. DaCosta said she and Jordan Peele chose shadow puppets after speaking "early on about how much we would hate to do a traditional flashback scene (laughs) or to use footage from the original film, 'cause we wanted this to stand on its own. He mentioned shadow puppetry, and then in Chicago we developed [something] with this amazing theatre production company and from there it became less about flashbacks and more about how we depict these stories, these legends."

== Music ==
The original score soundtrack was composed by Chicago musician Robert Aiki Aubrey Lowe, who used solo compositions based around voice and extended modular synthesis techniques. He also used field recordings of Cabrini Green to capture the essence and spirit of the neighborhood and layered it as textural elements on top of the main instruments. In January 2022, Variety reported that the film score briefly made the shortlist for the 2022 Academy Awards in the category of Best Original Score; however, it did not make the official final ballot list. Phillips Glass' song "Helen's Theme/Music Box" was also reimagined by Lowe as a new interpolation on the soundtrack as well as in one scene and end credits in the film. Additionally, Playboi Carti recorded the song H00dByAir in 2021 for the film's soundtrack, revealed in 2024 roughly nine months after the release of the track.

== Release ==
=== Theatrical ===
Candyman was originally scheduled to be released by Universal Pictures on June 12, 2020, but due to the COVID-19 pandemic, it was pushed to September 25, 2020, and then again to October 16, 2020, taking the previous release date of Halloween Kills. The film was then delayed to August 27, 2021. It was released on-demand on September 17, 2021.

=== Home media ===
Candyman was released for purchase on digital video on demand with new exclusive early access to bonus material featurette clips including an alternate ending, extended scenes and behind the scenes interviews on streaming platforms such as Vudu, Apple TV, among others on November 2, 2021, and was released on DVD, Blu-ray and 4K UHD digital code release including all bonus material and special features on November 16, 2021.

=== Marketing ===
Summarizing the film's marketing results, RelishMix wrote that viewers were debating whether it was a remake or a sequel and that "with Jordan Peele on board, fan expectations run high in anticipation of the return of this classic horror villain, who's described as a 'Black Freddy or Black Jason', as the film explores racial issues. Plus, fans are looking at the journey into the fine art world, woven into artists' creations, as they are influenced by demons and ghosts." By August 2021, the film's promotional content was viewed 144.1 million times, 40 percent higher than the average horror film; the first and second trailers accumulated 75 and 60 million views, respectively. Additional marketing tactics about the film's premise included a Snapchat filter, a stunt activation in Chicago, and Peele daring viewers to tweet #Candyman five times, resulting in the film trending online.

== Reception ==
=== Box office ===
Candyman grossed $61.2 million in the United States and Canada, and $16.2 million in other territories, for a worldwide total of $77.4 million.

In the United States and Canada, Candyman was projected to gross around $15 million from 3,569 theaters in its opening weekend. The film took in $9.1 million on its first day, including $1.9 million from Thursday night previews. It went on to debut to $22 million, topping the box office. The audience was made up of 53% male, with African Americans (37%) and Caucasians (30%) making up a majority. The top markets in the U.S. were Los Angeles ($1.3 million) and New York ($1.1 million).

DaCosta became the first Black female director to have a film finish number one at the box office. The film dropped 53.2% in its sophomore weekend to $10.3 million (and a total of $12.5 million over the four-day Labor Day frame), finishing second behind newcomer Shang-Chi and the Legend of the Ten Rings. In its third weekend the film grossed $4.8 million, finishing fourth.

Worldwide, Candyman was released in 51 markets and made $5.23 million; the top countries were the United Kingdom ($1.48 million), Spain ($356,000), Mexico, Russia, and Germany.

=== Critical response ===
On the review aggregator website Rotten Tomatoes, 84% of 335 critics' reviews are positive, with an average rating of 7.3/10. The website's consensus reads: "Candyman takes an incisive, visually thrilling approach to deepening the franchise's mythology—and terrifying audiences along the way." On Metacritic, the film has a weighted average score of 72 out of 100 based on 54 critics, indicating "generally favorable" reviews. Audiences polled by CinemaScore gave the film an average grade of "B" on an A+ to F scale, while PostTrak reported 72% of audience members gave it a positive score, with 56% saying they would definitely recommend it.

Reviewing the film for The New York Times, Manohla Dargis wrote that "DaCosta plays with perspective, shifting between Anthony's and the intersecting, sometimes colliding worlds of more-successful artists, urban-legend propagators and, touchingly, profoundly scarred children." She points to the interspersed bits of shadow puppetry as a reflexive writing device that emphasizes Candyman is fundamentally about storytelling, writing: "We tell some fictions to understand ourselves, to exist; others we tell to turn other human beings into monsters, to destroy." Odie Henderson, reviewing the film for RogerEbert.com, praised DaCosta's visual style, writing that she "stages the kill scenes with a mix of pitch-black humor, misdirection, and clever framing, fully acknowledging that what you don't see—or think you saw—can be a lot worse than what you did see."

In her review of Candyman for The A.V. Club, Anya Stanley wrote that the film's various interests are "more than a 91-minute movie can adequately explore," but conceded "there are worse crimes for a movie to commit than having too many ideas." She explained: "Where Bernard Rose spoke on White anxieties and the image of the scary Black man in 1992, DaCosta expands the conversation, relocating the horror from one man to the many structures that foment brutality upon the Black populace."

In her review for Vulture, Angelica Jade Bastién called Candyman "the most disappointing film of the year so far," writing that it limns "not only the artistic failures of the individuals who ushered it to life, but the artistic failures of an entire industry that seeks to commodify Blackness to embolden its bottom line." Robert Daniels expressed similar disappointment with the film in his review for Polygon, describing it as "cluttered, preachy, and not nearly scary enough." He took particular issue with the way the film fails to convey the geographical importance of Cabrini–Green, writing that the "lack of a visual metaphor makes the film's exploration of gentrification more of an assemblage of nonspecific dialogue. It talks about what gentrification is, and not what it looks like."

David Rooney of The Hollywood Reporter wrote: "Director Nia DaCosta, working from a script she wrote with Jordan Peele and Win Rosenfeld, uses Bernard Rose's 1992 film as a jumping-off point for bone-chilling horror that expands provocatively on the urban legend of the first film within the context of Black folklore and history, as well as the distorting White narrative that turns Black victims into monsters." Reviewing the film for TheWrap, Elizabeth Weitzman said: "DaCosta, Peele, and Rosenfeld are playing with us—the victim is rendered less sympathetically than Candyman—as much as they are with notions of history, culture, art and appropriation. They bring in actors from the first film (including Tony Todd and Vanessa Estelle Williams) but not always in ways we expect. They build on canon while simultaneously dismantling it." Aedan Juvet of Screen Rant also named the movie: "The Most Rewatchable Horror Film of 2021."

=== Accolades ===
Award	Date of ceremony	Category	Recipient(s)	Result	Ref.
NAACP Image Awards	February 26, 2022	Outstanding Writing in a Motion Picture	Win Rosenfeld, Nia DaCosta, and Jordan Peele	Nominated	
Black Reel Awards	February 28, 2022	Outstanding Director	Nia DaCosta	Nominated	
Black Reel Awards	February 28, 2022	Outstanding Screenplay, Adapted or Original	Nia DaCosta, Jordan Peele, and Win Rosenfeld	Nominated	
Black Reel Awards	February 28, 2022	Outstanding Score	Robert Aiki Aubrey	Nominated	
ADG Excellence in Production Design Awards	March 5, 2022	Contemporary Feature Film	Cara Brower	Nominated	
Visual Effects Society Awards	March 8, 2022	Outstanding Supporting Visual Effects in a Photoreal Feature	Tom Proctor, Gavin Gregory, Julian Gnass, and Fabricio Baessa	Nominated	
Critics' Choice Super Awards	March 17, 2022	Best Horror Movie	Candyman	Nominated	
Critics' Choice Super Awards	March 17, 2022	Best Actor in a Horror Movie	Yahya Abdul-Mateen II	Won	
Critics' Choice Super Awards	March 17, 2022	Best Villain in a Movie	Tony Todd	Nominated	
Fangoria Chainsaw Awards	May 15, 2022	Best Wide-Release Film	Candyman	Nominated	
Fangoria Chainsaw Awards	May 15, 2022	Best Lead Performance	Yahya Abdul-Mateen II	Won	
Fangoria Chainsaw Awards	May 15, 2022	Best Costume Design	Lizzie Cook	Nominated	
