= The Blue Iguana =

1988 film directed by John Lafia

- Theatrical release poster
- Directed by: John Lafia
- Written by: John Lafia
- Produced by: Steve Golin
- Starring: Dylan McDermott; Jessica Harper; James Russo; Tovah Feldshuh; Dean Stockwell
- Cinematography: Rodolfo Sánchez
- Edited by: Scott Chestnut
- Music by: Ethan James
- Production companies: Cinexacto Films; PolyGram Movies; Propaganda Films; Volcanica Films
- Distributed by: Paramount Pictures (United States and Canada); 20th Century Fox (International)
- Release date: April 22, 1988
- Running time: 90 minutes
- Country: United States
- Language: English
- Box office: $161,398

The Blue Iguana is a 1988 American crime comedy film directed by John Lafia and starring Dylan McDermott, Jessica Harper, Pamela Gidley and James Russo. The plot is about a bounty hunter who is blackmailed into stopping the transfer of twenty million dollars from a Mexican tax paradise into the United States. The film was screened out of competition at the 1988 Cannes Film Festival.

== Plot ==
IRS agents send a private eye (Dylan McDermott) to Mexico to recover money laundered by a banker (Jessica Harper) and her sidekick (James Russo).

== Cast ==
- Dylan McDermott as Vince Holloway
- Jessica Harper as Cora
- James Russo as Reno
- Pamela Gidley as Dakota
- Yano Anaya as Yano
- Flea as Floyd
- Michele Seipp as Zoe, The Bartender
- Tovah Feldshuh as Detective Vera Quinn
- Dean Stockwell as Detective Carl Strick
- Katia Schkolnik as Mona
- John Durbin as Louie Sparks
- Eliett as Veronica
- Don Pedro Colley as Boat Captain
- Pedro Altamirano as "Rubberhead"
- Benny Corral as Roy

== Reception ==
Roger Ebert gave The Blue Iguana a negative review and described it as "a smart-aleck parody of private-eye movies, but it knows as little about private eyes as it does about parodies, and movies".
