= Russell Buchanan =

American veteran

Russell A. Buchanan (January 24, 1900 – December 6, 2006) was, at age 106, one of the last surviving American veterans of the First World War. He served in the Navy during the final months of World War I and later on enlisted in the Army to serve in World War II when he was in his 40s.

== Biography ==
Buchanan was born in Cambridge, Massachusetts, and died in Watertown, Massachusetts. In 1918, Buchanan enlisted in the United States Navy at age 18. Russell stayed in the military long enough to have served in the Second World War, however, he retired from service in 1943 (i.e. after 25 years of service), and died at age 106 from a stroke.
