= Candyman (character) =

Fictional character in the Candyman film series

- Candyman character
- Tony Todd's portrayal in Candyman (1992)
- First appearance: Literature: "The Forbidden" (1985); Film: Candyman (1992)
- Created by: Clive Barker
- Portrayed by: Tony Todd; Michael Hargrove; Cedric Mays; Yahya Abdul-Mateen II

In-universe information
- Full name: Daniel Robitaille (Note: The spelling of his name is according to the credits of Candyman: Day of the Dead.); Sherman Fields; William Bell; Samuel Evans; George Stinney; James Byrd Jr.; Gil Cartwright; Anthony McCoy
- Alias: "The Sweet"
- Species: Boogeyman ghost (formerly human)
- Significant others: Caroline Sullivan (lover); Helen Lyle (reincarnation of Caroline)
- Descendants: Isabel Sullivan (daughter); Octavia Tarrant (great-granddaughter); Annie Tarrant (great-great-granddaughter); Ethan Tarrant (great-great-grandson); Caroline McKeever (great-great-great-granddaughter, reincarnation of daughter)
- Year of birth: c. 1865 (Note: Although no year of birth is given, according to Candyman: Farewell to the Flesh he was born immediately after the conclusion of the American Civil War (which ended in April 1865).)
- Primary locations: Cabrini–Green, Chicago, Illinois; New Orleans; Los Angeles
- Signature weapon(s): Prosthetic hook; Spectral bees
- Abilities: Hypnosis; Trance; Mind control; Possession; Invisibility; Hive mind; Levitation

Daniel Robitaille, colloquially known as Candyman, is a fictional character and the main antagonist of the Candyman film series. The character originated in Clive Barker's 1985 short story "The Forbidden". In the film series, he is depicted as an African-American man who was brutally murdered for a forbidden 19th-century interracial love affair; he returns as an urban legend, and kills anyone who summons him by saying his name five times in front of a mirror. The character is played by Tony Todd in Candyman (1992), Candyman: Farewell to the Flesh (1995), and Candyman: Day of the Dead (1999). Todd reprises the role in Candyman (2021), a sequel of the original 1992 film, in which the character adds additional souls to his "hive" of Candyman forms: Sherman Fields (played by Michael Hargrove), William Bell, Samuel Evans, George Stinney, James Byrd Jr., Gil Cartwright (played by Cedric Mays), and Anthony McCoy (played by Yahya Abdul-Mateen II).

== Appearances ==
=== Literature ===
The character originated in Clive Barker's short story "The Forbidden", initially printed in semiprozine Fantasy Tales and later published in volume five of Barker's six-volume Books of Blood anthology collection. The story was partially inspired by a cautionary tale Barker's grandmother told him when he was six to teach him to be careful of strangers, about a hook-handed man who cut off a boy's genitals. It also draws on a motif Barker had developed since his 1973 play Hunter in the Snow: the calmly spoken gentleman-villain. The Fantasy Tales publication featured an illustration by artist John Stewart that deviates from the author's words – depicting a beastly man in silhouette with wild hair and an elaborate hook hand. In the text itself, Candyman is described thus:

He was bright to the point of gaudiness: His flesh was a waxy yellow. His thin lips are pale blue. His wild eyes are glittering as if their irises are set with rubies. His jacket was patchwork and his trousers are the same. He looked, [Helen] thought, almost ridiculous with his bloodstained motley and the hint of rouge on his jaundiced cheeks.

The Candyman's iconic hook and bees are introduced in the story with Helen and other characters. Although Candyman is described as above, his race, name, place of origin, and backstory are never mentioned; doubting his existence is enough to summon him.

=== Films ===
Candyman's first film appearance was in Candyman (1992). Set contemporaneously, the film follows Helen Lyle, a graduate student in Chicago, who investigates him as the central figure of an urban legend connected to a series of murders at the Cabrini–Green Homes.

Helen writes a thesis about how Cabrini–Green's residents attribute their hardships to this apparently mythical figure. When she discredits the legend, analyzing examples of his history and participating in the arrest of a criminal using the Candyman legend to intimidate the locals, Candyman appears and frames her for another series of murders to perpetuate the public's fear of him.

It is hinted that Helen is the reincarnation of Candyman's lover. He plots to have himself, Helen, and kidnapped baby Anthony McCoy immolated in a bonfire, but Helen escapes him and sacrifices herself to rescue Anthony. With Candyman destroyed, Helen becomes a vengeful spirit and continues his behavior.

In Candyman: Farewell to the Flesh, set three years after Candyman in 1995, he appears in New Orleans. Candyman encounters Annie Tarrant (a descendant of his and Caroline's daughter Isabel) after she summons him. The movie explores how he meets Caroline Sullivan during his lifetime (as the artist Daniel Robitaille) before he is murdered and becomes Candyman.

In Candyman: Day of the Dead, set twenty-five years after Farewell to the Flesh, in 2020, Candyman appears in Los Angeles during Day of the Dead celebrations, encountering Annie's adult daughter Caroline.

In Candyman (2021), set twenty-seven years after Candyman (1992), in 2019, Candyman is summoned once more by a now adult Anthony McCoy. It is revealed that the legend of Candyman has survived and evolved by being recontextualized throughout the years around similar tragic murders of African-Americans killed by racist authorities in ways that resemble his (Daniel Robitaille's) death, and that these figures become part of "the hive" of Candyman. The Candyman before Anthony was a mentally disabled man named Sherman Fields, who was accused of placing razor blades in children's candy before being beaten to death by the police for it, although he turned out to be innocent. Eventually, a disfigured and catatonic Anthony is gunned down by the police, thereby enabling Candyman to assimilate Anthony and renew his legend. Other characters depicted as part of the Candyman hive include Anthony Crawford, William Bell, Samuel Evans, George Stinney, Helen Lyle, James Byrd Jr., and (in deleted scenes) Gil Cartwright.

== Development ==
=== Concept and creation ===
Granville T. Candyman [was] the scion of a rich black family in 1870s Chicago. Having gained fame for his portraits and music Granville is commissioned to paint Helen, the ravishing daughter of a wealthy landowner. Granville demands that Helen pose in the nude as Venus, and her shock soon turns into love. This forbidden interracial affair brings the city's wrath down on Granville. Cutting his right painting hand off with a rusty blade, the lynch mob then covers his naked body with honey, cheering as he's stung to death by bees.

— Tony Todd, outlining the Candyman's backstory

When Tony Todd and co-star Virginia Madsen were cast as Candyman and Helen, original Candyman director Bernard Rose gave them free rein to flesh out their characters' backstories as part of the creative process. Rose said, "The Candyman is not black in Clive's story. In fact, the whole back story of the interracial love affair that went wrong is not in the book. Everything that's in the book is in the film, but it's been amplified." Todd came up with the character's backstory during rehearsals with Madsen. He called his character "Granville T. Candyman", who has a forbidden love affair with a white woman whose portrait he paints (leading to his lynching). The name "Granville" is never used, and the character's name ultimately becomes Daniel Robitaille.

=== Characterization ===
The Candyman is largely driven by a need to sustain his legacy, killing those who doubt his existence. He has been described as a "ghoul fueled by the 'faith' of his believers. He is forced to deal with his followers to make them believe again and punish the interloper who leads them astray." In Draculas, Vampires and Other Undead Forms: Essays on Gender, Race and Culture, the character is compared to a vampire: "[Candyman] possesses the capacity to hypnotize his prey such that they appear to desire their victimizations."

Tony Todd compared his ability to invoke fear, suggestion and seduction to the DC Comics villain Scarecrow. Todd also compared his character to the Phantom of the Opera and the Hunchback of Notre Dame; all are "monsters" who use tenderness and terror in an unsuccessful attempt to win the love of a female protagonist. Virginia Madsen confirmed that the Candyman was intended to be an "African-American Dracula", "appealing to the African-American community because they finally had their own Dracula".

In Day of the Dead, the lynch mob chants "Candyman" five times before he dies. Summoning a specter by chanting his name repeatedly in front of a mirror may be traced back to Bloody Mary. In the short story, the character describes his existence as an urban legend: "I am rumor. It's a blessed condition, believe me. To live in people's dreams; to be whispered at street-corners; but not have to be". According to the film version, "I am the writing on the wall, the whisper in the classroom. Without these things, I am nothing".

=== Appearance and abilities ===
In the films, the Candyman's physical appearance is often seen by the subject who summoned him and those who believe in him. He cannot be seen directly by individuals who don't believe in him, nor can he be captured by surveillance systems, but he may be seen in reflections by any affected subject. Daniel Robitaille's physical body appears to be rotting away with his chest cavity exposed (hidden by his trench coat) with bees swarming in the flesh. As Sherman Fields, his beaten face is rotten. When Anthony McCoy becomes a Candyman, his entire body goes through a fleshy transformation, developing a beehive-like appearance throughout his skin.

Across the films, Candyman often uses his voice to possess an individual by hypnosis, encouraging them to surrender to him and become immortal. In the 2021 film, the spirit of Candyman through Sherman Fields doesn't speak but rather makes painful, eerie breathing sounds. He can make it seem as if his subjects committed his murders themselves.

Candyman also has the ability to swiftly disappear and instantly change positions around the subject. He also has the ability to levitate. In Candyman (1992), Helen Lyle sees him floating horizontally as well as swiftly flying backwards out of a window. He is seen by Annie Tarrant in Farewell to the Flesh rising from water into the air, landing on top of water. In Day of the Dead, he appears to Caroline McKeever levitating towards her with bees surrounding him. In Candyman (2021), bees follow him when he floats.

== Background ==
Daniel Robitaille was born the son of a slave and an unidentified woman who went by the name Thia B., on January 17, 1865 at the Esplanade Plantation in New Orleans, Louisiana. Daniel's father Wendale became wealthy after inventing a machine that mass-produced shoes throughout the American Civil War. Because of his father's newfound wealth, Daniel grew up in high society and got sent to the best schools in America. He grew up to become a polite and good-natured gentleman and a well-known painter, most famous for capturing a person's status in portraits.

Sometime in 1890, the young painter had been commissioned by Heyward Sullivan, a Plantation owner and former Confederate Army colonel, to paint a portrait of his daughter Caroline. When Daniel was working on his portrait, he fell in love with Caroline and made her pregnant. When her father found out, he became enraged and sent his thugs to find Daniel and kill him. They chased him to the Near North end of Chicago and eventually captured him and took him to a field to punish him for his affair. They sawed off his right hand with a rusty blade, they smeared honey from a stolen apiary all over his body, which caused a swarm of bees to sting Daniel to death. Everyone came back hours later to the field where Daniel last was but to their shock, he was still alive. Caroline ran through the crowd to stop them but Heyward had his two thugs stop her.

As a final act, Heyward lashed out at Daniel, claiming he defiled his daughter and taunted him by showing him his disfigured face in a magic mirror. Daniel uttered his final words before Heyward transferred his soul into the magic mirror, finally killing the painter. This deeply saddened Caroline to the point where she ran away to the South to raise her and Daniel's child. After his soul ended up in the mirror, Daniel came back from the dead as Candyman, a vengeful spirit who kills anyone for saying his name five times.

== Legacy ==
In 2007, Pitbull released the song "Candyman" titled after the urban legend of the same name. It is track nine to Pitbull's album The Boatlift and features Chicago rapper Twista who provides a verse to the halloween track.

The Candyman was ninth on Fandango and Bloody Disgusting's list of top 10 slasher icons, and eighth on an older Bloody Disgusting list. Based on a readers' poll, Rolling Stone ranked him tenth among horror villains. JoBlo.com ranked the Candyman fifth on its list of horror boogeymen, and ComingSoon.net ranked him seventh on its list of slasher villains.

Candyman is sometimes referenced in songs, most notably Tupac Shakur song "Troublesome '96" with him urging listeners to "say my name three times like Candyman...Bet I roll on yo' ass like an avalanche", which often confused many people to this present day with debates if the summoning was three or five, however the actual times to summon is five. It was in fact Bloody Mary who is summoned three times. Kanye West also gave mention in his song titled " Breathe In, Breathe Out" rapping, "So, say my name like Candyman, and I'ma come and fix you up like the handyman". Megan Thee Stallion was another rapper to mention him in her song titled "Scary" featuring Rico Nasty rapping, "Say my name like Candyman, and bitch, you know I'm there". R. J. Payne rapped this line in the 2025 Wu-Tang Clan and Mathematics song "Let's Do It Again": "A nightmare you wouldn't expect, Leatherface with the chainsaw, I Candyman hook you to death".

The character was often parodied or mentioned in many television, movies and media ranging from The Simpsons, South Park, The Chappelle Show, Key & Peele and the game show Wheel of Fortune. Social media also parodied Candyman in various ways with mock trailers or appearances in their videos/shorts. A meme created with a picture of Terrance Howard circulated in the late 2010s with the spelling caption of Candyman as 'CANDY-MAYNE' (pronounced candy-mine) due to his southern vocal accent and speaking annunciation of how he pronounces the word "man". It was then followed by mock VHS/DVDs/Blu-ray with Howard as the Candyman with the accent spelling in the title, also followed by edited parodied videos that went viral of what the movie would be like if Terrance Howard starred in the movie; it featured the impersonation of Howard's voice and likeness saying CANDY-MAYNE in the mirror and others correcting him to pronounce the name right otherwise he won't come out.

The "Ex" episode of the Rick and Morty spin-off President Curtis featured Candyman (voiced by Imari Williams). He was shown to have been rehabilitated by President Andre Curtis' ex-wife Beverly Mills who has since become the Governor-Elect of Illinois following her tenure as the Mayor of Chicago. His energy would be used for Mills' "Candyman Perpetual Energy Project". Candyman would later help President Curtis and Agent Alan Chomps in fighting the werewolf group Werewolves Anonymous who are against Mills' rehabilitation programs.

=== Merchandise ===
McFarlane Toys released a Candyman action figure as part of its Movie Maniacs Series 4 in 2001. More action figures were scheduled for release in November 2019 by NECA.

Yayha Abdul-Mateen II's version of the Anthony McCoy's Candyman was released from Funko Pop merchandising in 2022. It features him dressed in his painter's overall jumpsuit wearing the honey colored Trench coat with bees surrounding his honeycomb like face.

== See also ==
- List of horror film villains
