= Candyman (1992 film) =

Film by Bernard Rose

- Theatrical release poster
- Directed by: Bernard Rose
- Screenplay by: Bernard Rose
- Based on: "The Forbidden" by Clive Barker
- Produced by: Steve Golin; Sigurjon Sighvatsson; Alan Poul
- Starring: Virginia Madsen; Tony Todd; Xander Berkeley; Kasi Lemmons
- Cinematography: Anthony B. Richmond
- Edited by: Dan Rae
- Music by: Philip Glass
- Production companies: Propaganda Films; PolyGram Filmed Entertainment
- Distributed by: TriStar Pictures (United States, Canada, Latin America, Germany, Austria, Greece, Cyprus, Eastern Europe, the Middle East, Israel and Korea); PolyGram Filmed Entertainment (International)
- Release dates: September 11, 1992 (TIFF); October 16, 1992 (United States)
- Running time: 101 minutes
- Country: United States
- Language: English
- Budget: $8–9 million
- Box office: $25.8 million (US)

Candyman is a 1992 American urban gothic supernatural horror film written and directed by Bernard Rose and starring Virginia Madsen, Tony Todd, Xander Berkeley, Kasi Lemmons, and Vanessa E. Williams. Based on Clive Barker's short story "The Forbidden", the film follows a Chicago graduate student completing a thesis on urban legends and folklore, which leads her to the legend of the "Candyman", the hook-handed ghost of an African-American artist and son of a slave who was lynched in the late 19th century for his relationship with the daughter of a wealthy white man, and who now appears whenever his name is chanted five times in the mirror.

The film came to fruition after a chance meeting between Rose and Barker who later completed his own film adaptation of Nightbreed (1990). Rose expressed interest in Barker's story "The Forbidden", and Barker agreed to license the rights. Where Barker's story revolved around the themes of the British class system in contemporary Liverpool, Rose chose to refit the story to Cabrini-Green's public housing development in Chicago and instead focus on the themes of race and social class in the inner-city United States.

Candyman premiered at the 1992 Toronto International Film Festival, and was theatrically released on October 16, 1992, by TriStar Pictures in the United States, with PolyGram Filmed Entertainment releasing in other territories. It received generally positive reviews and grossed over $25 million in the United States, where it was also regarded in some critical circles as a contemporary classic of horror cinema. It was followed by three sequels: Candyman: Farewell to the Flesh (1995), Candyman 3: Day of the Dead (1999), and Candyman (2021), which serves as a direct sequel to the original.

== Plot ==
Helen Lyle is an anthropology graduate student at the University of Illinois Chicago. While researching urban legends, she familiarizes herself with Candyman, a spirit who kills anyone that speaks his name five times before a mirror. She learns of a recent murder at the Cabrini–Green Homes public housing project and several others that have been attributed by locals to Candyman. Skeptical, Helen and her friend Bernadette Walsh repeat Candyman's name to Helen's bathroom mirror, to no avail.

Helen and Bernadette work together on a thesis on how Cabrini-Green residents use the Candyman legend to cope with racial inequality. She and Bernadette visit the scene of the most recent murder. There, Helen discovers a room where sweets have been left for Candyman. Afterwards, they interview the victim's neighbor, Anne-Marie McCoy, a single mother raising her infant son Anthony. Helen and her husband Trevor, alongside Bernadette, later have dinner with Professor Phillip Purcell, an expert on the Candyman myth. He discloses that "Candyman" was an African-American man born in the late 1800s as the son of a slave who grew up to become a renowned painter. After he fell in love with and impregnated a white woman, her father sent a lynch mob after him. The mob sawed off his right hand and smeared him with honeycomb stolen from an apiary, attracting bees that stung him to death. His corpse was burned in a pyre erected on the site where the Cabrini-Green Homes were eventually built.

When Helen returns to Cabrini-Green, a young boy named Jake tells her of an incident where a developmentally disabled boy was castrated by Candyman in a public bathroom. Helen investigates the site, where a man claiming to be Candyman batters her with a hook. She identifies her attacker to the police, who recognize him as the head of a local gang and charge him for the murders attributed to Candyman. A few days later, however, the real Candyman appears to Helen in a parking garage, hypnotizing her. He explains that due to her discredit of his legend, he must shed innocent blood to perpetuate it. Helen blacks out and awakens in Anne-Marie's apartment, covered in blood, finding Anne-Marie's pet Rottweiler, Annie, decapitated and her son Anthony missing. Anne-Marie proceeds to attack Helen, who stabs Anne-Marie during their struggle. The police arrive and arrest Helen.

After Trevor bails her out of jail, Helen spots Candyman in a photograph she took at Cabrini-Green. Candyman breaks into Helen's apartment and cuts her neck, causing her to bleed and pass out. Bernadette arrives at Helen's apartment, and when Helen comes to, she realizes that Candyman has murdered Bernadette. Framed for the crime, Helen is committed to a psychiatric hospital. While being interviewed in preparation for her trial a month later, Helen attempts to prove her innocence by summoning Candyman, who appears and murders her psychiatrist. Candyman then frees Helen from her restraints, allowing her to escape.

Helen returns to her apartment to find Trevor now living with one of his students, Stacey. Helen confronts him, then flees to Cabrini-Green to rescue Anthony. When she finds Candyman in his lair, he informs Helen that her surrender to him will ensure Anthony's safety. Offering Helen immortality, Candyman opens his coat, revealing a ribcage wreathed in bees. The bees pour out of his mouth and stream down her throat as he kisses her. He vanishes with Anthony, and Helen awakes to discover a mural of the Candyman and his lover. Helen bears a striking resemblance to her and is hinted to be her reincarnation.

Candyman promises to release Anthony if Helen helps him strike fear into Cabrini-Green's residents. Attempting to feed his legend, Candyman reneges and attempts to immolate both Helen and Anthony in a pyre. Helen stabs Candyman with a flaming plank. The flames destroy Candyman's physical form and banish him to the Afterlife, whilst Helen dies in the fire after saving Anthony.

The residents, led by Anne-Marie and Jake, pay their respects at Helen's funeral. At home, the grief-stricken and guilt-ridden Trevor looks into the mirror and utters Helen's name five times, whereupon Helen's vengeful spirit appears and kills him using Candyman's hook, leaving a hysterical Stacey to uncover his body in the bathtub. A new mural of Helen dressed in white with her hair ablaze appears in Candyman's lair.

== Cast ==
- Virginia Madsen as Helen Lyle
- Tony Todd as Candyman
- Xander Berkeley as Trevor Lyle
- Vanessa Estelle Williams as Anne-Marie McCoy
- Kasi Lemmons as Bernadette "Bernie" Walsh
- DeJuan Guy as Jake
- Gilbert Lewis as Det. Frank Valento
- Carolyn Lowery as Stacey
- Stanley DeSantis as Dr. Burke
- Marianna Elliott as Clara
- Ted Raimi as Billy
- Michael Culkin as Phillip Purcell
- Bernard Rose as Archie Walsh
- Eric Edwards as Harold
- Rusty Schwimmer as Policewoman
- Latesha Martin & Lanesha Martin as Anthony McCoy
- Terrence Riggins as Gang Leader

== Production ==
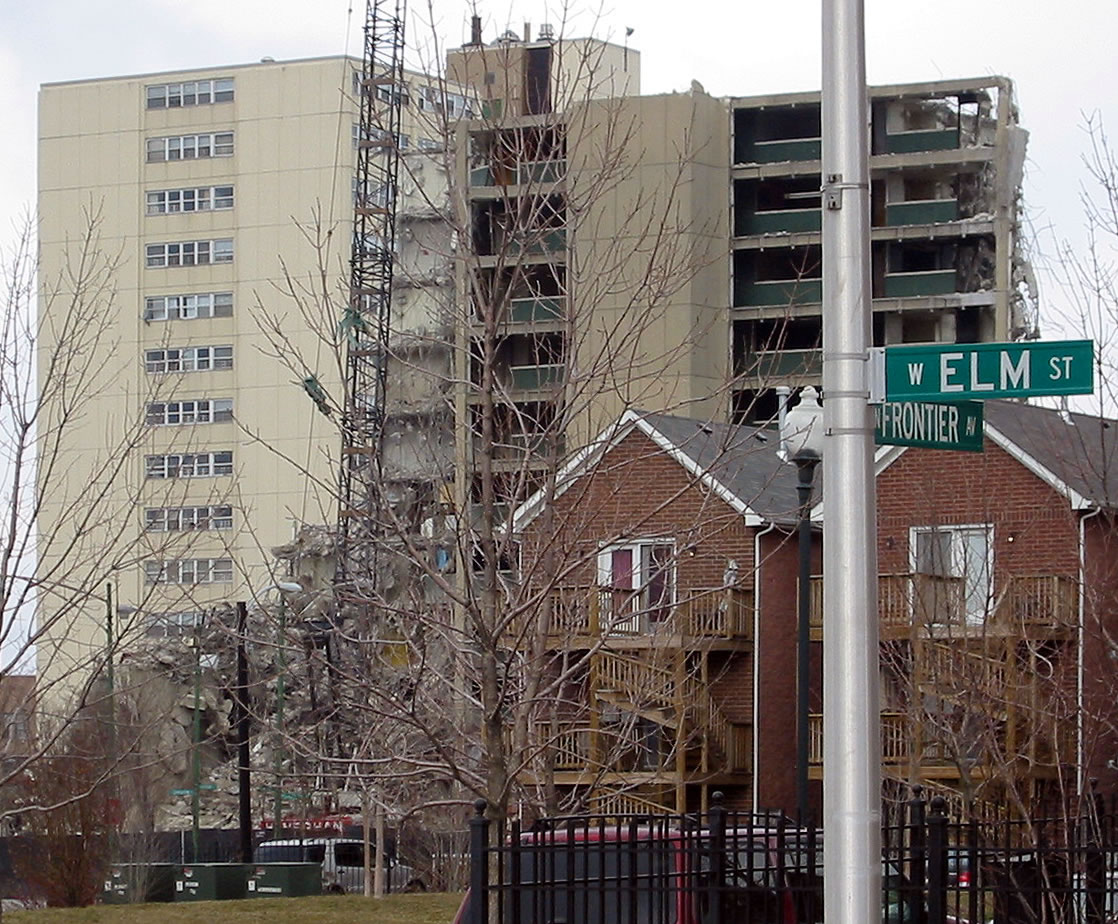
Cabrini-Green, where Rose filmed Candyman

Barker's short story, set in his native Liverpool, was about segregation and the culture of the poor urban areas. For Candyman, Rose was so shocked by Chicago's "dynamic" architecture and large amount of prejudice that he decided to change the Liverpool location to Chicago. Assisted by members of the Illinois Film Commission, Rose scouted locations in Chicago and found Cabrini-Green, a housing project notorious for its poor construction, violence and high robbery rates. The project was also located in between high-class neighborhoods, meaning that the character of Helen could feel Cabrini-Green's chaos from a safe apartment not too far away. This Americanization of the story turned Candyman into an interracial love story where the ghetto residents are now victims of the titular killer. With this change, Rose wanted to showcase those that are living in the poor neighborhoods as regular human beings that are trying to get by which is why he avoided tropes that are common in most American ghetto stories such as gangs and drugs.

Rose's screenplay garnered a huge amount of attention in the casting agencies and Virginia Madsen and Tony Todd instantly tried to get parts to have a chance to work with the filmmaker. It was long rumored that Eddie Murphy was the original choice for the role of Candyman and that the filmmakers could not afford him, but Rose denied this in 2021, calling the notion "not even a tiny bit true." Todd, who was fit for playing the killer as he was six-foot-five [1.96 m] and physically fit, recalled that there was skepticism from his colleagues about him playing the Candyman due to the number of bee sting injuries that he would have to receive. He persisted as he wanted to work with the director and said, "I've always wanted to find my own personal Phantom of the Opera." While the Candyman's background is unknown in the original story, Todd came up with the backstory for the character in the film. Virginia Madsen was friends with Rose and his then-wife, Alexandra Pigg and Madsen was originally to play the role of Helen's friend, Bernie while Pigg was to play Helen. The choice was made to make the character of Bernie Black American so Madsen lost the part. As the shooting was about to commence, Pigg discovered that she was pregnant so the role of Helen was offered to Madsen. Had Madsen been unable to accept, producer Alan Poul was partial to Sandra Bullock as Helen.

Three days of Candyman's filming were spent on Cabrini-Green while the other days were spent in scenes on Hollywood sound stages. With plainclothes law enforcement by their side, Todd and Madsen went into the buildings of Cabrini-Green as part of researching their roles which was a useful, but distressing experience for both actors. For playing the Candyman, Todd tried to act as a "primeval boogeyman" without overacting the part which was tricky to do. He worked with Bob Keen on the Candyman's look. Keen first had Todd wear a machine-controlled fake right arm, but found the movements of the arm too strict. Then, Keen came up with the idea of having Todd wear a hook to indicate the Candyman's supernatural being. He spent three hours making the hook. Todd suggested the character wear an eyepatch, but Keen rejected the idea. To keep the budget low, Rose instructed a special effects manager named Martin Bresson to use traditional effects instead of optical effects. The same team who worked on Backdraft also designed the set for the bonfire scene of Candyman which involved using 1,500 US gallons (5,700 L) of propane and its largest section having a 70 feet (21 m) width and 30 feet (9.1 m) height.

The honeybees in Candyman were controlled by Norman Gary who previously handled the bees on films such as The Deadly Bees (1966), My Girl (1991) and Fried Green Tomatoes (1991). Synthesised queen-bee pheromone was used to calm the bees down. The film used more than 200,000 real honeybees throughout and most of the crew wore bodysuits to be protected from stings, although all of them faced at least one sting. Todd negotiated a bonus of $1,000 for each of the 23 bee stings that he received during filming. In shooting the film's climax where the Candyman sends 500 bees into Helen's face, he first had the bees placed in his mouth by using a protective mouthpiece to avoid as many stings as possible. Gary had to use freshly hatched, non-stinging and non-flying bees for the scene as Madsen was very allergic to stings. It took half an hour for all of the bees to get into Todd's mouth and he recalled being "tranced out" when he let all of the bees out of his mouth. Rose also utilized hypnosis in his movie to work around what he saw as the cliche of excessive screaming in the horror films. Bernard Rose came up with the idea to have Virginia Madsen hypnotized in the scenes where she confronted the Candyman. According to Todd, this process would occur prior to filming the scenes where he and Madsen interacted and would take roughly ten minutes to prepare. This was accomplished through the use of a professional hypnotist who established a key word that Rose would use to put Madsen under a trancelike state.

== Music ==
The film's score was composed by Philip Glass. According to Glass, "It has become a classic so I still make money from that score, get checks every year." A compilation of music from the film and from the first sequel was released under the title The Music of Candyman as the inaugural release of Glass's Orange Mountain Music record company in 2001. A limited edition featuring 7500 copies of the film's soundtrack was released in February 2015.

== Release ==
Candyman had its world premiere at the 1992 Toronto International Film Festival, playing as part of its Midnight Madness line-up. It was released on October 16, 1992, in the United States where it made $25.7 million.

It was released on home video on March 17, 1993, by Columbia TriStar Home Video. It proved popular in the home video market, and in April 1993 became one of the top 10 most rented films in the United States. A special edition DVD was released in August 2004. Arrow issued a limited edition of Candyman on 4K Ultra HD Blu-ray in the UK on May 23, 2022. It features a new 4K restoration from the original negative, both the US R-rated version and the original UK theatrical version featuring alternate footage, two booklets, six UK lobby card reproductions and a poster. Scream Factory also issued a 4K edition in the United States and Canada on May 24, 2022.

There was some controversy that the film was depicting racism and racial stereotypes. According to Rose, "I had to go and have a whole set of meetings with the NAACP because the producers were so worried and what they said to me when they'd read the script was 'Why are we even having this meeting? You know, this is just good fun.' Their argument was 'Why shouldn't a black actor be a ghost? Why shouldn't a black actor play Freddy Krueger or Hannibal Lecter? If you're saying that they can't be, it's really perverse. This is a horror movie.'" At the time of the film's release, Madsen said, "I was and am now worried about how people will respond. I don't think Spike Lee will like this film."

== Reception ==
=== Critical response ===
On Rotten Tomatoes, the film has a rating of 79% from 82 reviews. The critical consensus reads, "Though it ultimately sacrifices some mystery in the name of gory thrills, Candyman is a nuanced, effectively chilling tale that benefits from an interesting premise and some fine performances." Metacritic, which uses a weighted average, assigned the film a score of 61 out of 100, based on 15 critics, indicating "generally favorable" reviews. On CinemaScore, it holds a "C+".

Among the more positive reviews was Roger Ebert of the Chicago Sun-Times. He gave the film three stars out of a possible four, and praised the performances of Madsen and Lemmons and the subtle direction by Rose. Ebert wrote: "Elements of the plot may not hold up in the clear light of day, but that didn't bother me much. What I liked was a horror movie that was scaring me with ideas and gore, instead of simply with gore." Janet Maslin of The New York Times compared it to "an elaborate campfire story" with an "unusually high interest in social issues", and also highlighted Madsen's performance and Glass's musical score. AllMovie called it "haunting, intelligent and poetic" and "the finest Barker adaptation ever committed to film". In a review for Channel 4 Candyman has been called "atmospheric and visually stimulating enough to satisfy gore-hounds", as well as an "intelligent social commentary". Slant Magazine's Eric Henderson positively reviewed both the eponymous character and the leading actor: "Played by Tony Todd (and his velvety basso profundo voice), the Candyman is a svelte, sexual monument, far removed from the silent brutality of your average serial slasher."

Kevin Thomas of the Los Angeles Times was harsher in his review and called the film Clive Barker's "worst to date"—an ambitious, but pretentious film that "quickly becomes as repellent as it is preposterous."

The film came in at number 75 on Bravo's 100 Scariest Movie Moments. The character Candyman came in at number 8 on Bloody Disgusting's "The Top 13 Slashers in Horror Movie History" and ranked the same on Ugo's "Top Eleven Slashers". The actor who played Candyman, Tony Todd, made #53 on Retrocrush's "The 100 Greatest Horror Movie Performances" for his role. The film appears in two sections of Filmsite.org's "Greatest Scariest Movie Moments and Scenes" and "Greatest Movie Twists, Spoilers and Surprise Endings". In 2001, the American Film Institute nominated this film for AFI's 100 Years...100 Thrills.

=== Accolades ===
Year	Award/Ceremony	Category	Recipient(s)	Result	Ref.
1993	Fangoria Chainsaw Awards	Best Actress	Virginia Madsen	Won	
1993	Fangoria Chainsaw Awards	Best Studio/Wide-Release Film	—N/a	Nominated	
1993	Fangoria Chainsaw Awards	Best Screenplay	Bernard Rose	Nominated	
1993	Fangoria Chainsaw Awards	Best Actor	Tony Todd	Nominated	
1993	Fangoria Chainsaw Awards	Best Supporting Actress	Vanessa E. Williams	Nominated	
1993	Fangoria Chainsaw Awards	Best Soundtrack	Philip Glass	Nominated	
1993	Saturn Awards	Best Actress	Virginia Madsen	Won	
1993	Saturn Awards	Best Horror Film	—N/a	Nominated	
1993	Saturn Awards	Best Writing	Bernard Rose	Nominated	
1993	Saturn Awards	Best Make-Up	Bob Keen; Image Animation	Nominated	
1993	Fantasporto	Best Film	Bernard Rose	Nominated	
1993	Avoriaz Fantastic Film Festival	Best Actress	Virginia Madsen	Won	
1993	Avoriaz Fantastic Film Festival	Best Music	Philip Glass	Won	
1993	Avoriaz Fantastic Film Festival	Audience Award	Bernard Rose	Won	
1993	Avoriaz Fantastic Film Festival	Grand Prize	Bernard Rose	Nominated	

== Sequels ==
Two stand-alone sequels comprising a single storyline were released in 1995 and 1999 respectively: Candyman: Farewell to the Flesh and Candyman: Day of the Dead. Todd was the only actor to return for both films. Originally, Bernard Rose wanted to make a prequel film about Candyman and Helen's love but the studio turned it down.

In September 2018, it was announced that Jordan Peele was to produce a direct sequel to the 1992 film, with Nia DaCosta signing on as director that November. The film serves as a sequel, taking place back in the new gentrified Cabrini-Green where the old housing projects development once stood in Chicago. Yahya Abdul-Mateen II was cast in the lead role, as a grown-up Anthony McCoy, with Todd reprising his role as the title character. Production for the film took place from August to September 2019 in Chicago, Illinois. The working title of the film was revealed on some of the cast and crew social media pages as Say My Name, which was discreetly used in the revised scripts and production sets to keep things "flying under the radar" with the official title also being Candyman. The film was released on August 27, 2021.

== Sources ==
- Badley, Linda (1996). Writing Horror and the Body: The Fiction of Stephen King, Clive Barker, and Anne Rice. Westport, Connecticut: Greenwood Publishing Group. ISBN 978-0-313-29716-8.
- Schweiger, Daniel (October 1992). "Candyman: A Nightmare Sweet". Fangoria. No. 117. pp. 24–28, 62.
