= Final Combination =

- UK theatrical release poster
- Directed by: Nigel Dick
- Screenplay by: Larry Golin
- Story by: Jonathan Tydor
- Produced by: Gregg Fienberg; Steve Golin
- Starring: Michael Madsen; Lisa Bonet
- Cinematography: David Bridges
- Edited by: Henry Richardson; Jonathan P. Shaw
- Music by: Rolfe Kent
- Distributed by: PolyGram Filmed Entertainment
- Release date: 1994
- Country: United States
- Language: English

Final Combination (also known as Lights Out and Dead Connection) is a 1994 crime-thriller film directed by Nigel Dick, and starring Michael Madsen and Lisa Bonet.

== Plot ==
Detective Matt Dickson is investigating a series of grisly murders committed in seedy motels across Los Angeles. He gets a break in the case when he realizes the killer is consistently using the names of boxers for aliases. Meanwhile, reporter Catherine Briggs is also pursuing the serial killer, but for her own mysterious reasons. Matt and Catherine begin working together, but the investigation becomes complicated when they start having an affair.

== Cast ==
- Michael Madsen as Detective Matt Dickson
- Lisa Bonet as Catherine Briggs
- Gary Stretch as Richard Welton
- Tim Russ as Detective Chuck Rowland
- Damian Chapa as Donato
- Carmen Argenziano as Lieutenant Stein
- Clarence Landry as Ike "Point Man" Pointer
- Susan Byun as Sara
- Parker Posey as Denise
- Alan Toy as Art Robinson
- Eric Da Re as Anthony, The Bouncer
- Julio Oscar Mechoso as Linen Suit

== Release ==
The film was released theatrically in the United Kingdom on November 18, 1994 on 12 screens and grossed £13,521 in its opening weekend.
