= Yahya Abdul-Mateen II =

American actor (born 1986)

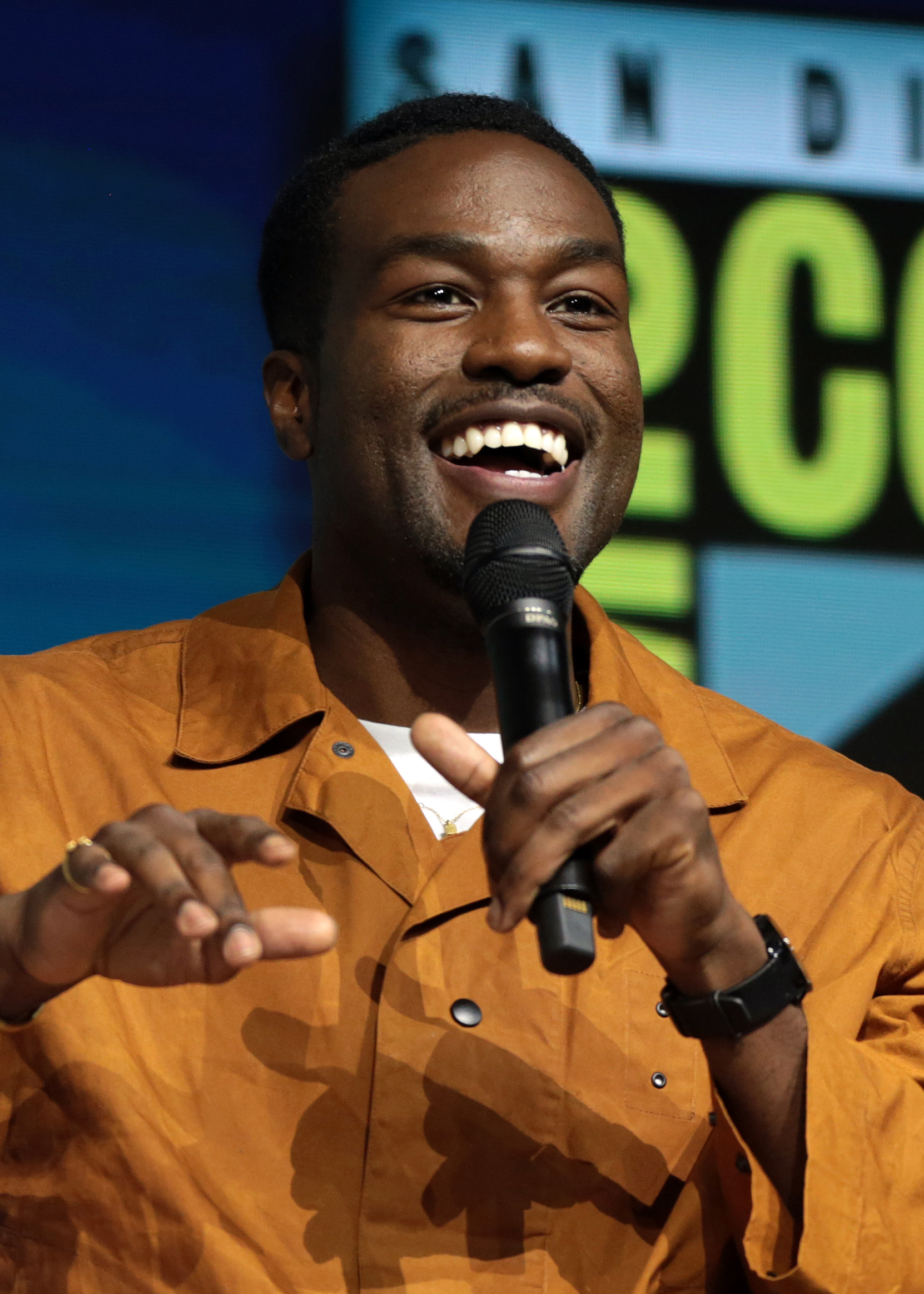
- Abdul-Mateen at the 2018 San Diego Comic-Con
- Born: July 15, 1986 (age 40); New Orleans, Louisiana, U.S.
- Education: University of California, Berkeley (BArch); Yale University (MFA)
- Occupation: Actor
- Years active: 2012–present

Yahya Abdul-Mateen II (/ˈjɑːhiə/; born July 15, 1986) is an American actor. He is best known for his roles as Black Manta in the superhero films Aquaman (2018) and Aquaman and the Lost Kingdom (2023), Bobby Seale in the Netflix historical legal drama The Trial of the Chicago 7 (2020), and Morpheus / Agent Smith in The Matrix Resurrections (2021). For his portrayal of Cal Abar / Doctor Manhattan in the HBO limited series Watchmen (2019), he won a Primetime Emmy Award. He also starred in episodes of The Handmaid's Tale (2018) and Black Mirror (2019).

He made his Broadway debut in the Suzan-Lori Parks play Topdog/Underdog for which he received a Tony Award for Best Leading Actor in a Play nomination. He has played Simon Williams / Wonder Man in media set in the Marvel Cinematic Universe, starring in the Disney+ series Wonder Man (2026), for which he was nominated for a Primetime Emmy Award.

== Early life ==
Abdul-Mateen was born in New Orleans, Louisiana. His mother, Mary, is Christian, while his father (1945–2007) was Yahya Abdul-Mateen I (birth name John Ford), a member of the New Orleans Masjid of Al-Islam, a former Nation of Islam temple founded in the 1960s that later adopted Sunni Islam. He is the youngest of six children. He spent his childhood in the Magnolia Projects of New Orleans, and then moved to Oakland, California, where he attended McClymonds High School. At McClymonds, he was an athlete (Note: He played against future NFL player Marshawn Lynch.) and self-described geek who enjoyed chess and was voted prom king. The family was eventually priced out of Oakland and moved to Stockton, California.

During his time at the University of California, Berkeley, Mateen became a member of Alpha Phi Alpha fraternity and competed as a hurdler for the California Golden Bears. A teammate suggested he take a theater class; that class helped him overcome his stutter. He graduated with a degree in architecture, and then worked as a city planner in San Francisco. After being laid off from his job, he enrolled at Yale School of Drama and graduated with a Master of Fine Arts degree.

== Career ==
Early in his career, Abdul-Mateen was adamant about not altering his Muslim name or using a stage name, countering the implications that having a Muslim name would impede his success. In 2016, Abdul-Mateen began his acting career with Stephen Adly Guirgis and Baz Luhrmann's musical drama series The Get Down, which premiered on Netflix. His character Clarence "Cadillac" Caldwell is a prince of the disco world. He was praised for his performance in the series.

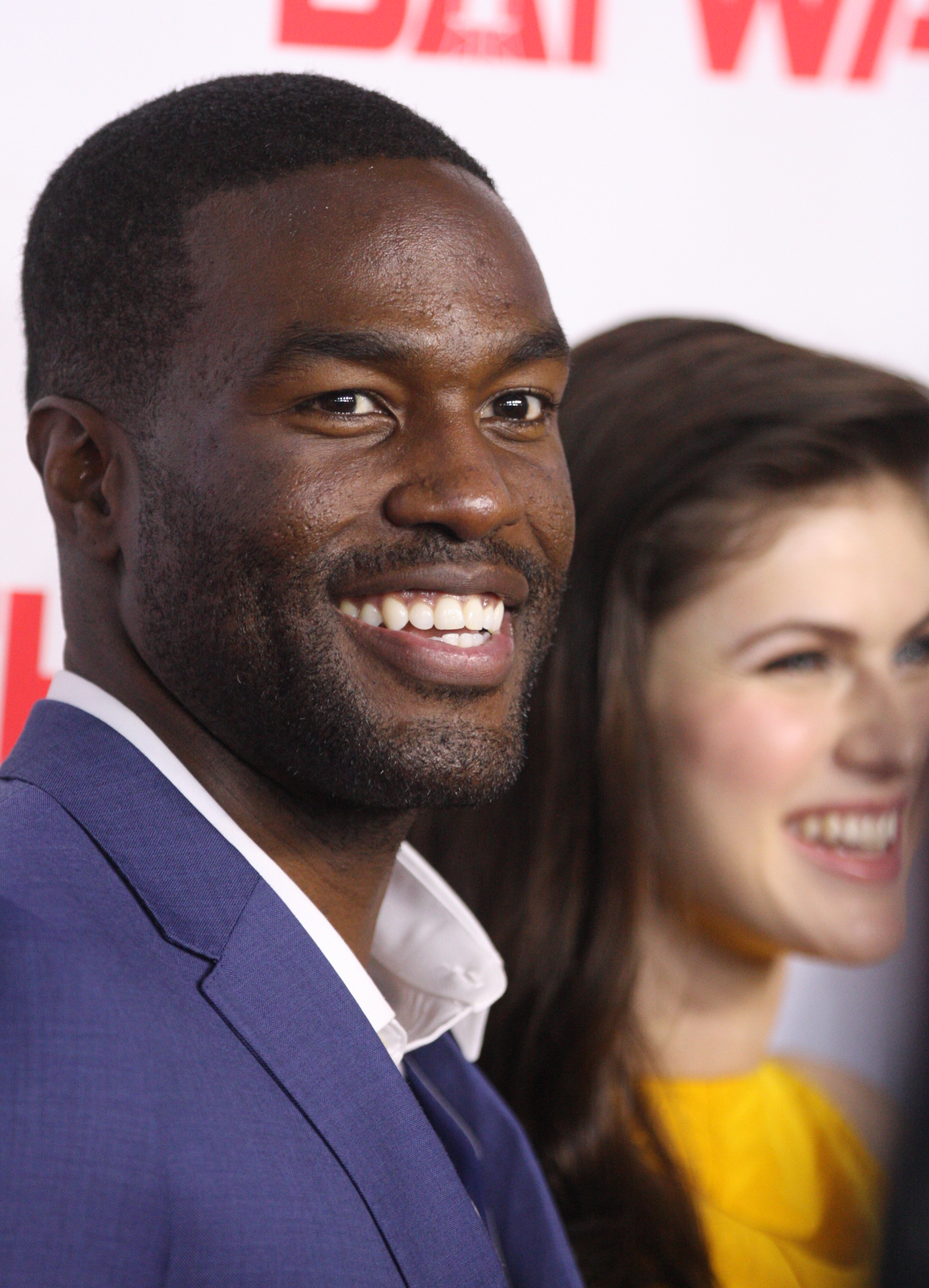
Abdul-Mateen in 2017

In 2017, Abdul-Mateen appeared in Shawn Christensen's drama film The Vanishing of Sidney Hall, in the role of Duane. It premiered at the 2017 Sundance Film Festival.

Abdul-Mateen played a police officer, Garner Ellerbee, in the 2017 action comedy film Baywatch along with Dwayne Johnson and Zac Efron, and directed by Seth Gordon. He also played acrobat W. D. Wheeler in the musical film The Greatest Showman, which also starred Efron as well as Hugh Jackman, Michelle Williams, Rebecca Ferguson, and Zendaya.

In 2018, he starred in the road trip drama film Boundaries, along with Vera Farmiga and Christopher Plummer, directed and written by Shana Feste; and played DC Comics villain Black Manta in the film Aquaman, which started shooting in May 2017 in Australia.

In the 2019 film Us, directed by Jordan Peele, Abdul-Mateen appears in a flashback as the main character's father. He also starred in "Striking Vipers", the first episode of the fifth season of Netflix's science-fiction anthology series Black Mirror. Later in the year, he played Cal Abar, known as Doctor Manhattan, in the HBO superhero drama miniseries Watchmen, which earned him his first Emmy Award for Outstanding Supporting Actor in a Limited Series or a Special in September 2020.

Abdul-Mateen starred as Morpheus / Agent Smith in the 2021 film The Matrix Resurrections. He also starred in Nia DaCosta's 2021 film Candyman.

That November, Abdul-Mateen launched a production company called House Eleven10, which is named after his childhood home in Oakland, California, and focused on Abdul-Mateen bringing to life stories of his youth, and to uplift talent from under represented communities. The company launched with a creative partnership through Netflix which included Abdul-Mateen starring and producing in films for the streamer.

In September 2022, he made his Broadway debut in the revival of the Suzan-Lori Parks play Topdog/Underdog alongside Corey Hawkins. He remained in the role until January 2023, and earned a Tony nomination for Best Leading Actor in a Play.

In 2022, Abdul-Mateen was cast as the Marvel Comics character Simon Williams in the Disney+ series Wonder Man which premiered on January 27, 2026. In March of that same year, the show was renewed for a second season. Around the same time, he was set to star as John Creasy in the Netflix tv adaptation of Man on Fire.

== Personal life ==
Abdul-Mateen lives in New York City. After his father's death in 2007, Abdul-Mateen began researching his family history, explaining that "My father grew up and passed away with the longing to know where his father was from and about his father's history." His father had West Indian heritage.

== Acting credits ==
=== Film ===
Year	Title	Role	Notes
2017	The Vanishing of Sidney Hall	Duane Jones	
2017	Baywatch	Sergeant Garner Ellerbee	
2017	The Greatest Showman	W. D. Wheeler	
2018	First Match	Darrel	
2018	Boundaries	Serge	
2018	Aquaman	David Kane / Black Manta	
2019	Us	Russel Thomas / Weyland	
2019	Sweetness in the Belly	Aziz	
2020	All Day and a Night	Big Stunna	
2020	The Trial of the Chicago 7	Bobby Seale	
2021	Candyman	Anthony McCoy and Candyman	
2021	The Matrix Resurrections	Morpheus / Smith	
2022	Ambulance	William "Will" Sharp	
2023	Aquaman and the Lost Kingdom	David Kane / Black Manta	
2026	By Any Means	Agent Wayne Strider	
2026	The Further Mis-Adventures of Cliff Booth	Roderick "Hot Rod" Harrison	
TBA	Liminal	TBA	Filming

Key
†	Denotes films that have not yet been released

=== Television ===
Year	Title	Role	Notes
2016–2017	The Get Down	Clarence "Cadillac" Caldwell	Main role
2018	The Handmaid's Tale	Omar	Episode: "Baggage"
2019	Black Mirror	Karl	Episode: "Striking Vipers"
2019	Watchmen	Cal Abar / Doctor Manhattan	Miniseries; 8 episodes
2026	Wonder Man	Simon Williams / Wonder Man	Lead role; 8 episodes
2026	Man on Fire	John Creasy	Lead role; Also executive producer

Key
†	Denotes television productions that have not yet been released

=== Theater ===
Year	Title	Role	Notes
2022–2023	Topdog / Underdog	Booth	John Golden Theatre, Broadway debut

== Accolades ==
Year	Association	Category	Nominated work	Result	Ref.
2020	Black Reel Awards	Outstanding Supporting Actor, TV Movie or Limited Series	Watchmen	Won	
2020	Primetime Emmy Awards	Outstanding Supporting Actor in a Limited Series or Movie	Watchmen	Won	
2020	Florida Film Critics Circle Awards	Best Ensemble	The Trial of the Chicago 7	Runner-up	
2021	AARP Movies for Grownups Awards	Best Ensemble	The Trial of the Chicago 7	Nominated	
2021	Austin Film Critics Association Awards	Best Ensemble	The Trial of the Chicago 7	Nominated	
2021	Black Reel Awards	Outstanding Breakthrough Performance, Male	The Trial of the Chicago 7	Nominated	
2021	Critics' Choice Awards	Best Acting Ensemble	The Trial of the Chicago 7	Won	
2021	Detroit Film Critics Society Awards	Best Ensemble	The Trial of the Chicago 7	Nominated	
2021	Georgia Film Critics Association Awards	Best Ensemble	The Trial of the Chicago 7	Nominated	
2021	Hollywood Critics Association Film Awards	Best Cast Ensemble	The Trial of the Chicago 7	Nominated	
2021	San Diego Film Critics Society Awards	Best Ensemble	The Trial of the Chicago 7	Runner-up	
2021	Screen Actors Guild Awards	Outstanding Performance by a Cast in a Motion Picture	The Trial of the Chicago 7	Won	
2021	Washington D.C. Area Film Critics Association Awards	Best Acting Ensemble	The Trial of the Chicago 7	Nominated	
2022	Critics' Choice Super Awards	Best Actor in a Horror Movie	Candyman	Won	
2022	Fangoria Chainsaw Awards	Best Lead Performance	Candyman	Won	
2023	Drama League Awards	Distinguished Performance	Topdog/Underdog	Nominated	
2023	Theatre World Awards	Outstanding Debut Performance in a Broadway or Off-Broadway Production	Topdog/Underdog	Won	
2023	Tony Awards	Best Leading Actor in a Play	Topdog/Underdog	Nominated	
2026	Astra TV Awards	Best Actor in a Comedy Series	Wonder Man	Nominated	
2026	Black Reel Awards	Outstanding Lead Performance in a Comedy Series	Wonder Man	Won	
2026	Critics' Choice Super Awards	Best Actor in a Superhero Series	Wonder Man	Nominated	
2026	Dorian Awards	Best TV Performance — Comedy	Wonder Man	Nominated	
2026	Primetime Emmy Awards	Outstanding Lead Actor in a Comedy Series	Wonder Man	Nominated	

== See also ==
- African-American Tony nominees and winners
