= El Paso in popular culture =

The city of El Paso, Texas, United States, has been featured in many films, as well as in TV shows and popular music.

== Events ==
- Fleetwood Mac held their first concert that featured Stevie Nicks and Lindsey Buckingham in El Paso in 1975. Stevie Nicks attended Loretto Academy and Bassett Junior High in El Paso as a teenager.

== Films ==
- Citizen Kane (1941). During the opening News on the March segment, the front page of the fictitious El Paso Daily Journal announces the death of Charles Foster Kane.
- Take the High Ground! (1953), starring Richard Widmark and Karl Malden
- For a Few Dollars More (1965), the second film in the Dollars Trilogy, starring Clint Eastwood and Lee Van Cleef, is set in El Paso.
- Manos: The Hands of Fate (1966), which is reputed to be one of the worst films ever made, was shot in and around El Paso. It premiered in 1966 at the downtown Capri Theater.
- The Getaway (1972), starring Steve McQueen and Ali MacGraw
- In The Stepford Wives, El Paso is mentioned by one woman as having comparatively few murders compared to Dallas; she says this is because they put chemicals in the water to make people passive, and she links this to why the women in Stepford are so passive.
- The Bad News Bears in Breaking Training (1977), starring William Devane
- Big Wednesday (1978), starring Jan Michael Vincent and Gary Busey
- When You Comin' Back, Red Ryder? (1979), starring Hal Linden and Lee Grant
- Resurrection (1980), starring Ellen Burstyn
- In The Border (1982), starring Jack Nicholson and Harvey Keitel, all the border scenes, Nicholson's character's house, the refugee camp scene, and the U.S. Embassy scene were shot in and around El Paso.
- Wrong Is Right (1982), starring Sean Connery
- Lone Wolf McQuade (1983), starring Chuck Norris and David Carradine
- Paris, Texas (1984), starring Harry Dean Stanton and Dean Stockwell
- Lost in America (1985), starring Albert Brooks and Julie Hagerty
- Extreme Prejudice (1987), starring Nick Nolte and Powers Boothe
- Wild at Heart (1990), starring Nicolas Cage and Laura Dern
- Blue Sky (1994), starring Jessica Lange and Tommy Lee Jones
- Last Man Standing (1996) starring Bruce Willis, Bruce Dern, Christopher Walken, and Karina Lombard
- Lolita (1997), starring Jeremy Irons and Melanie Griffith
- On the Border (1998), starring Casper Van Dien, Bryan Brown, Daniel Baldwin
- Committed (2000), starring Heather Graham
- Traffic (2000), starring Benicio del Toro, Michael Douglas, Catherine Zeta-Jones, Dennis Quaid and Don Cheadle
- The Original Latin Kings of Comedy (2002), featuring George Lopez, Cheech Marin, Joey Medina, Alex Reymundo and Paul Rodriguez, was shot at the Abraham Chavez Theater.
- Saving Jessica Lynch (2003), starring Laura Regan
- In the films Kill Bill: Volume 1 (2003) and Kill Bill: Volume 2 (2004), the Two Pines Wedding Chapel massacre is set in El Paso; however, the church is actually located in California.
- Man on Fire (2004), starring Denzel Washington and Dakota Fanning
- The Day After Tomorrow (2004), starring Dennis Quaid and Sela Ward
- Glory Road (2006), starring Josh Lucas, is set in El Paso.
- No Country for Old Men (2007), starring Tommy Lee Jones, Josh Brolin and Javier Bardem
- Stephen Fry in America (2008), documentary
- The Last Conquistador (2008), a PBS POV documentary about the Juan de Oñate statue controversy
- I'm Not Fat...I'm Fluffy (2009), starring Gabriel Iglesias, was shot at the Plaza Theater.
- In The Burning Plain (2009), starring Charlize Theron, one scene was shot on second floor at Southwest General Hospital.
- In the film Due Date (2010), Peter and Ethan accidentally crosses into Mexico from El Paso when Ethan mistakes the 'Mexico' sign at the border crossing for a 'Texaco' gas station.
- In the film Django Unchained (2012), Dr. King Schultz kills the El Paso Sheriff who in reality is an outlaw.
- The Counselor (2013), starring Michael Fassbender, Penélope Cruz, Javier Bardem, and Cameron Diaz
- Dumb and Dumber To (2014), starring Jim Carrey and Jeff Daniels
- Sicario (2015), starring Emily Blunt and Benicio del Toro
- Logan (2017), starring Hugh Jackman and Patrick Stewart, begins in El Paso.
- The Forever Purge (2021), starring Leven Rambin and Josh Lucas
- Memory (2022 film), starring Liam Neeson, and Guy Pierre
- One Battle After Another (2025) starring Leonardo DiCaprio, Sean Penn, Chase Infiniti, Regina King, Benico Del Toro, and Teyana Taylor

== Video games ==
- In Ghost Recon Advanced Warfighter 2, the penultimate mission is set in El Paso.
- In Where the Water Tastes Like Wine, El Paso is one of the cities you can visit.
- In Call of Duty: Modern Warfare II, El Paso is depicted as the border city in one of the satellite images of the fictional city of Las Almas, Mexico in the campaign.
- In Fallout 76, El Paso is mentioned, introduced in the Wastelanders update.

== Popular music about El Paso ==
El Paso has become a favored destination for many musicians. Songs written about or mentioning El Paso include:

- "El Paso" by Marty Robbins, a popular country ballad released in 1959. Robbins followed it in 1966 with a prequel, "Feleena (from El Paso)", and a sequel in 1976, "El Paso City".
- "Take The Money and Run" – a 1976 hit song by the Steve Miller Band – tells the story of two bandits who "go down to old El Paso" and "ran into a great big hassle".
- The 1976 Chinga Chavin song "Asshole From El Paso" (most famously recorded by Kinky Friedman the same year), a parody of Merle Haggard's "Okie from Muskogee", mentions El Paso in both the lyrics and the title. The song lampoons various morality viewpoints attributed to residents of the city.
- W.A.S.P.'s 1985 Blind In Texas song mentions "An El Paso hellhole, I couldn't get higher..." and "San Antonio, and the West Texas town El Paso...".
- El Paso is the setting described in "Yawning or Snarling", a song by The Tragically Hip from their 1994 album Day for Night. The song alludes to both the days and the nightlife and tourism in El Paso.
- American artist Tori Amos references El Paso in her song, "Mother Revolution", featured on her 2005 album, The Beekeeper.
- "King of El Paso" is the 8th track on the Boz Scaggs album Dig.
- Taking Back Sunday's first track of their 2011 eponymous album is named "El Paso", where the band started production of the album.
- Khalid's songs "American Teen" and "Winter" (both from his 2017 debut album) and "Suncity" and "9.13" (from his 2018 EP Suncity songs) mention El Paso; the singer began his career while attending high school in El Paso.

== Printed works about El Paso ==
- The Blue Beetle comic book series takes place in El Paso.
- The books Aristotle and Dante Discover the Secrets of the Universe and Aristotle and Dante Dive into the Waters of the World, by Benjamin Alire Sáenz, are set in El Paso.

== Television shows set in El Paso ==
- In Breaking Bad season 2 (2009), DEA Agent Hank Schrader is transferred from his office in Albuquerque to the headquarters in El Paso.
- Kingpin (NBC pilot) (2003), starring Yancey Arias and Brian Benben
- The Bridge, an American police drama on the FX network based on the Danish/Swedish series
- Veronica Mars (2004), mentions El Paso in the pilot episode.
- In 9-1-1, the character Eddie was born in El Paso.
