= List of films set in a single location =

This page lists films that are set fully, or almost entirely, in only one location. Such films are sometimes referred to as "bottle movies" or "chamber pieces". In June 2023, film critic and director Chris Stuckmann speculated that the limitations that chamber pieces bring not only make writers self-conscious but also drive their creativity.

== List of films ==
Film	Year	Director	Notes	Ref.
10 Cloverfield Lane	2016	Dan Trachtenberg	Set in a bunker.	
12 Angry Men	1957	Sidney Lumet	Set almost entirely in a jury room.	
12 Angry Men	1997	William Friedkin	Set almost entirely in a jury room.	
127 Hours	2010	Danny Boyle	Set in a canyon.	
1BR	2019	David Marmor	Set in an apartment complex.	
Age of Cannibals	2014	Johannes Naber	Set in a series of hotel rooms.	
All Is Lost	2013	J. C. Chandor	Set in the Indian Ocean, first in a damaged yacht and then in a life raft.	
All Is Vanity	2021	Marcos Mereles	Set in a London warehouse.	
Almanac of Fall	1984	Béla Tarr	Set in a claustrophobic apartment.	
The Antares Paradox	2022	Luis Tinoco	Set in a single room	
Assault on Precinct 13	1976	John Carpenter	Set in a decommissioned police precinct.	
Assault on Precinct 13	2005	Jean-François Richet	Set in a decommissioned police precinct.	
ATM	2012	David Brooks	Located in and around an ATM booth.	
Bad Shabbos	2024	Daniel Robbins	Set almost entirely in a single apartment.	
The Big Kahuna	1999	John Swanbeck	Set in a hotel hospitality suite.	
Biosphere	2022	Mel Eslyn	Located in a shelter.	
The Bitter Tears of Petra von Kant	1972	Rainer Werner Fassbinder	Almost totally restricted to the protagonist's bedroom.	
Blue Film	2025	Elliot Tuttle	Set in an Airbnb house.	
The Boat	2018	Winston Azzopardi	Set on a sailboat.	
Bodies Bodies Bodies	2022	Halina Reijn	Set at a house party.	
Boiling Point	2021	Philip Barantini	Set in a restaurant.	
Brake	2012	Gabe Torres	Set inside a car trunk.	
The Breakfast Club	1985	John Hughes	Set in high school detention.	
Breaking	2022	Abi Damaris Corbin	Set almost entirely in a bank.	
Brink of Life	1958	Ingmar Bergman	Set in a maternity ward.	
Bug	2006	William Friedkin	Set mostly in a motel room.	
Bullet Train	2022	David Leitch	Set in a fictionalized version of the Tokaido Shinkansen.	
The Bullet Train	1975	Junya Satō	Set on a bullet train.	
Buried	2010	Rodrigo Cortés	Set in a coffin.	
Carnage	2011	Roman Polanski	Set in an apartment.	
Circle	2015	Aaron Hann, Mario Miscione	Set in a darkened room.	
Clerks	1994	Kevin Smith	Set almost entirely in a convenience store.	
Clue	1985	Jonathan Lynn	Set in a mansion.	
Coherence	2013	James Ward Byrkit	Set at a dinner party.	
Copshop	2021	Joe Carnahan	Set in a police station.	
Craving	2023	J. Horton	Set in a roadside bar.	
Cube	1997	Vincenzo Natali	Set in a large unidentified cube.	
Cujo	1983	Lewis Teague	Set in a car.	
Daddio	2024	Christy Hall	Set in a car.	
Deathtrap	1982	Sidney Lumet	Set in a secluded home.	
Deterrence	1999	Rod Lurie	Set in a diner.	
Devil	2010	John Erick Dowdle	Set in an elevator.	
Dial M for Murder	1954	Alfred Hitchcock	Set in an apartment.	
Dog Day Afternoon	1975	Sidney Lumet	Set mostly in a bank.	
The Evil Dead	1981	Sam Raimi	Set in and around a cabin in the woods.	
Exam	2009	Stuart Hazeldine	Set in an exam hall.	
Exit 8	2025	Genki Kawamura	Set in a subway corridor.	
Failure!	2023	Alex Kahuam	Set in a three-story family home.	
Fall	2022	Scott Mann	Set on top of a TV tower.	
Feast	2005	John Gulager	Set in a tavern.	
Free Fire	2016	Ben Wheatley	Set in an abandoned factory.	
Friend of the World	2020	Brian Patrick Butler	Set in a bunker.	
Frozen	2010	Adam Green	Set on a chairlift	
Goodbye, Dragon Inn	2003	Tsai Ming-liang	Set in a movie theater.	
Glorious	2022	Rebekah McKendry	Set in a public bathroom.	
Grave Encounters	2011	The Vicious Brothers	Set in a psychiatric hospital.	
Knock at the Cabin	2023	M. Night Shyamalan	Set in a cabin in the woods.	
The Guilty	2018	Gustav Möller	Set in a police emergency call center.	
The Guilty	2021	Antoine Fuqua	Remake of the 2018 film.	
The Hateful Eight	2015	Quentin Tarantino	Set in a ranch waystation.	
Hemet, or the Landlady Don't Drink Tea	2023	Tony Olmos	Set in an apartment complex.	
Humane	2024	Caitlin Cronenberg	Set in a large home.	
The Immaculate Room	2022	Mukunda Michael Dewil	Set in a large white room.	
Inside	2023	Vasilis Katsoupis	Set in a billionaire's penthouse.	
Intruder	1989	Scott Spiegel	Set in a grocery store.	
The Invitation	2015	Karyn Kusama	Set at a dinner party.	
The Invite	2026	Olivia Wilde	Set mostly in a couple's apartment home.	
Iron Lung	2026	Markiplier	Set in a midget submarine.	
It Ends	2025	Alexander Ullom	Set on an endless two-lane highway.	
It's a Disaster	2012	Todd Berger	Set in a suburban home.	
Key Largo	1948	John Huston	Set in a hotel during a hurricane.	
The Last House	2026	Louis Leterrier	Set in a suburban home.	
Last Shift	2014	Anthony DiBlasi	Set in a police station.	
The Last Stop in Yuma County	2023	Francis Galluppi	Set in a diner.	
Late Night with the Devil	2024	Colin & Cameron Cairnes	Set on a late-night talk show.	
Lifeboat	1944	Alfred Hitchcock	Set on a lifeboat.	
Locke	2013	Steven Knight	Set in a car.	
Lord of the Flies	1963	Peter Brook	Set on a desert island.	
Lord of the Flies	1990	Harry Hook	Set on a desert island.	
Malum	2023	Anthony DiBlasi	Set in a police station.	
The Man from Earth	2007	Richard Schenkman	Set in a farewell party.	
Mass	2021	Fran Krantz	Set in a single room.	
Miss Julie	2014	Liv Ullmann	Set in a manor house.	
My Dinner with Andre	1981	Louis Malle	Set in Café des Artistes.	
Next Door	2021	Daniel Brühl	Set in a pub.	
Night of the Living Dead	1968	George Romero	Set almost entirely in a farmhouse.	
Nine Dead	2009	Chris Shadley	Set in a room.	
No Exit	2022	Damien Power	Set in road-side rest stop during a snowstorm.	
No Through Road	2009	Steven Chamberlain	Set on a no through road.	
Once Upon a Time in a Cinema	2026	David Gleeson	Set mostly in a movie theater.	
One Night in Miami...	2020	Regina King	Set almost entirely in a motel room	
The Outfit	2022	Graham Moore	Set in a tailor shop.	
Panic Room	2002	David Fincher	Set in a New York City brownstone.	
The Party	1968	Blake Edwards	Set at a Hollywood house party.	
Penny Dreadful	2006	Richard Brandes	Set almost entirely in a stranded car in the woods.	
Perfect Strangers	2016	Paolo Genovese	Set around the dinner table.	
Phone Booth	2002	Joel Schumacher	Set mostly in a phone booth.	
The Platform	2019	Galder Gaztelu-Urrutia	Set in a Vertical Self-Management Center.	
Primate	2025	Johannes Roberts	Set in a cliffside Hawaii mansion.	
Rear Window	1954	Alfred Hitchcock	Set in an apartment.	
The Rental	2020	Dave Franco	Set mostly in a Pacific Northwest house.	
Reservoir Dogs	1992	Quentin Tarantino	Set mostly in a warehouse.	
Room	2015	Lenny Abrahamson	Largely confined to a shed.	
Rope	1948	Alfred Hitchcock	Set in an apartment.	
Sanctuary	2022	Zachary Wigon	Set in a hotel room.	
Secret Honor	1984	Robert Altman	Set in a single room.	
Share?	2023	Ira Rosensweig	Set in a single room.	
Shirin	2008	Abbas Kiarostami	Set inside a theater.	
Shiva Baby	2020	Emma Seligman	Set almost entirely in a shiva home.	
Shut In	2022	D.J. Caruso	Set in a single house; mostly in the kitchen pantry.	
The Silent House	1929	Walter Forde	Set in a house.	
The Silent House	2010	Gustavo Hernández	Set in a house.	
Silent House	2011	Chris Kentis and Laura Lau	Set in a house.	
Sleuth	1972	Joseph L. Mankiewicz	Set in a manor house.	
Snowpiercer	2013	Bong Joon-ho	Set in a train.	
Something	2018	Stephen Portland	Set in a house.	
Stalled	2013	Christian James	Set in an office bathroom.	
The Sunset Limited	2011	Tommy Lee Jones	Set in an apartment.	
Tape	2001	Richard Linklater	Set in a hotel room.	
Undertone	2025	Ian Tuason	Set in a podcaster's house	
Universal	2025	Stephen Portland	Set in a vacation rental cabin.	
Venus in Fur	2013	Roman Polanski	Set in a theater.	
Wait Until Dark	1967	Terence Young	Set in an apartment.	
The Whale	2022	Darren Aronofsky	Set in an apartment.	
What Happened Was	1994	Tom Noonan	Set on a date.	

== See also ==
- Bottle episode
