= Aristotle and Dante Discover the Secrets of the Universe (film) =

2022 film by Aitch Alberto

- Theatrical release poster
- Directed by: Aitch Alberto
- Screenplay by: Aitch Alberto
- Based on: Aristotle and Dante Discover the Secrets of the Universe by Benjamin Alire Sáenz
- Produced by: Byron Archard; Dylan Sellers; Chris Parker; Eugenio Derbez; Ben Odell; Lin-Manuel Miranda; Kyra Sedgwick; Valerie Stadler
- Starring: Max Pelayo; Reese Gonzales; Verónica Falcón; Kevin Alejandro; Eva Longoria; Eugenio Derbez
- Cinematography: Akis Konstantakopoulos
- Edited by: Stefanie Visser; Harry Yoon
- Music by: Isabella Summers
- Production companies: Limelight; 3Pas Studios; 5000 Broadway Productions; Big Swing Productions
- Distributed by: Blue Fox Entertainment
- Release dates: September 9, 2022 (TIFF); September 8, 2023 (United States)
- Running time: 96 minutes
- Country: United States
- Languages: English; Spanish
- Box office: $407,838

Aristotle and Dante Discover the Secrets of the Universe is a 2022 American coming-of-age romantic drama film written and directed by Aitch Alberto, based on the 2012 novel of the same name by Benjamin Alire Sáenz. It follows two Mexican-American teenage boys who find an instant connection in 1987 El Paso, Texas, and stars Max Pelayo and Reese Gonzales as the title characters. Verónica Falcón, Kevin Alejandro, Eva Longoria, and Eugenio Derbez complete the rest of the cast.

Aristotle and Dante had its premiere at the 47th International Toronto Film Festival on September 9, 2022. It was released theatrically in the United States on September 8, 2023, by Blue Fox Entertainment.

== Plot ==
In 1987 El Paso, Aristotle "Ari" Mendoza is a surly teenager frustrated by his parents' refusal to tell him about his incarcerated brother Bernardo. At a public pool, Ari meets unconventional fellow Mexican-American Dante Quintana, who teaches him how to swim. The two boys become fast friends despite their differences. Dante's well-off parents invite Ari on a camping trip, where both he and Dante appreciate the vastness of the night sky. During a rainy evening near the end of the summer, Dante tells Ari that the Quintanas will be moving to Chicago for the following school year due to his father's professor job. Dante gets distracted by a baby bird and is nearly hit by a car; Ari gets injured pushing him out of the way.

In the year that follows, Ari adopts a dog, is gifted a truck by his parents, and slowly begins to fit in at school. He begins fooling around with a female classmate, Elena. Meanwhile, Dante's letters speak of burgeoning homosexuality. Ari finally learns what caused Bernardo's imprisonment – he had killed a trans prostitute as a teenager.

The Quintanas return at the beginning of the next summer. Ari and Dante drive out to the desert, where Dante asks Ari to kiss him. The kiss makes Ari uncomfortable and he insults Dante. Ari's Tia Ophelia also passes away, and he learns that she had been disavowed by most of the extended family for living with a female partner.

Dante is hospitalized after some homophobic boys attacked him in an alley after seeing him with his boyfriend Daniel. A furious Ari tracks down Daniel, then one of the perpetrators, and brutally attacks the latter. A discussion with his parents causes Ari to realize that he is in love with Dante. The two boys drive out to the desert, where Ari confesses his feelings. The film ends with them lying in the back of Ari's truck, holding hands.

== Cast ==
- Max Pelayo as Aristotle "Ari" Mendoza
- Reese Gonzales as Dante Quintana
- Eugenio Derbez as Jaime Mendoza
- Eva Longoria as Soledad Quintana
- Verónica Falcón as Liliana Mendoza
- Isabella Gomez as Gina Navarro
- Luna Blaise as Elena Tellez
- Kevin Alejandro as Sam Quintana
- Marlene Forte as Tía Ophelia

== Production ==
In early 2017, it was revealed that Aitch Alberto was in the process of developing a screenplay based on Benjamin Alire Sáenz's novel. In 2016, she had flown to Texas to pitch her idea to Sáenz and discuss the rights to adapt his novel; she first read the book in 2014 and had written a spec script. At the beginning of 2018, she contacted Lin-Manuel Miranda, who had narrated the audiobook for the novel, inviting him to board the pop project as a producer. Kyra Sedgwick's newly launched Big Swing Productions joined the project in 2018.

Xolo Maridueña and Reese Gonzales, the latter of whom would go on to reprise his role in the film, performed a live reading of Alberto's screenplay at the 2018 Outfest. Also on the live reading were Norma Maldonado, José Zúñiga, Liz Torres, Ana Ortiz, Madison De La Garza, Martin Morales, Norio Chalico, and Matt Pascua.

It was announced in October 2021 that Max Pelayo and Gonzales would respectively star as the titular characters in the film adaptation with Eugenio Derbez, Eva Longoria, Verónica Falcón, Isabella Gomez, Luna Blaise, and Kevin Alejandro rounding out the cast. Derbez would also produce the film for 3Pas Studios alongside Valerie Stadler, Ben Odell, Dylan Sellers and Chris Parker for Limelight. David Boies and Zack Schiller of Boies Schiller Entertainment would executive produce the film and CJ Barbato would co-produce.

Principal photography began in early October 2021, and was confirmed by director Aitch Alberto to have wrapped on November 2, 2021.

Sarah J. Coleman, who illustrated the book cover, was brought on board to design the film's main title and credits. Alberto has also stated that a film adaptation of the book's 2021 sequel is being considered.

== Release ==
Aristotle and Dante Discover the Secrets of the Universe had its world premiere at the 47th International Toronto Film Festival on September 9, 2022, with additional screenings on September 11 and 15. It was released theatrically in the United States on September 8, 2023, by Blue Fox Entertainment.

In August 2022, the film was first announced to be premiering at the 2022 Toronto International Film Festival's "Discovery" section, and following its premiere, the film was reported to be seeking distribution. In April 2023, it was announced that Blue Fox Entertainment had acquired the North American distribution rights to the film, with a wide theatrical release planned for summer 2023.

In December 2022, it was announced as a selection for the 34th annual Palm Springs International Film Festival in the "New Voices New Visions" Category, with screenings on January 8, 9, and 15, 2023. On January 31, it was announced as a selection for Miami Film Festival, with a screening planned for March 10, 2023. The film had been offered a prominent slot at the 2022 Sundance Film Festival, but Alberto opted to hold off until the autumn festivals to allow more time for "fine-tuning". She was included in Variety's prestigious "10 Directors to Watch" in January 2022 for her work on the film.

The film was released for digital platforms on November 14, 2023.

== Reception ==
=== Critical response ===
On the review aggregator website Rotten Tomatoes, 88% of 49 critics' reviews are positive, with an average rating of 7/10. The website's consensus reads: "A sweet, well-rounded coming-of-age story, Aristotle and Dante Discover the Secrets of the Universe adapts its source material with tenderness and care." Metacritic, which uses a weighted average, assigned the film a score of 69 out of 100, based on six critics, indicating "generally favorable" reviews.

Peter Debruge of Variety wrote "It’s easy to reduce Aristotle and Dante to a queer coming-of-age story, but as told, it’s also one of the most well-rounded teen movies around." Erik Piepenberg of The New York Times stated "A less sentimental, wish-fulfilling approach to Mexican American identity, gay self-discovery and Reagan-era Texas will wait for another day. Until then, fans of Heartstopper-style slow-burn romance will eat up this tender film’s subtle charms." Robert Abele of Los Angeles Times wrote "Though this fictional love story is not untouched by the kind of violence that continues to threaten LGBTQI visibility everywhere, Aristotle and Dante is distinguished by its atmosphere of compassion in which expression thrives. In a lovely way, it feels like this coming-of-age movie’s own 'something more.'" Valerie Complex of Deadline Hollywood wrote "Alberto’s story is less about coming out and more about standing in your truth, whatever that may be. If you’re queer, take pride in it, despite what the haters think. Your friends will always have your back and pick you up off the floor when the sliver of doubt sets in."

Angie Han of The Hollywood Reporter wrote "Aristotle and Dante‘s faults seem to stem, in large part, from a surplus of that same tenderness. That renders its flaws easy to forgive, or at least easy to want to forgive: If it jumps too eagerly to explain itself, it’s with the protectiveness of a parent desperate to shield her child from a judgmental or unforgiving world. But the shield that protects is the same shield that obscures. Aristotle and Dante has glimmers of beauty, and its story contains the potential for far more. If only it had been allowed the space to truly shine." Petrana Radulovic of Polygon wrote "The individual scenes that make up Aristotle and Dante Discover the Secrets of the Universe are lovely, full of the longing that defines the novel. Ari drifts through life as an outsider, only really himself when he’s with Dante, but never fully able to open his heart to his friend. But without the emotional weight to anchor them, without really digging into the impact of these scenes and the aftermath, it all floats away, distant as the stars the boys watch on the desert night."

Calling it as "a traditional teenage growing-up story, filled with angst and crushes and family discord", Katie Walsh of The Seattle Times noted that the film is "unique in its setting, the people within it and the issues that it takes on". Commenting on the performances, Walsh added "Pelayo and Gonzales tackle these complex roles with bravery and vulnerability. We seem to watch Pelayo as Aristotle grow up on screen before our very eyes, while Gonzales as Dante serves as the emotional anchor even though his presence is often ephemeral." Fred Topel of United Press International wrote "In 2023 Aristotle and Dante Discover the Secrets of the Universe can still do a lot of good making LGBTQ audiences and their families feel seen. Simply as a story about two friends learning about themselves and each other, it is a beautiful movie."

Raven Brunner of Game Rant wrote "The movie is a pure reminder of what it's like to be young and in love, and the harshness of being a teenager. It has lessons for all ages and while soft in nature, dives headfirst into the drama, giving way to an emotional and invigorating tonal shift in the final act. The diverse cast and crew honor the source material and understand the unique voice of Sáenz' writing." Erick Massoto of Collider wrote "Aristotle and Dante Discover the Secrets of the Universe has its heart in the right place, but its title suggests an unforgettable journey that it simply can't deliver. It also gives too much for Pelayo to do range-wise. That’s a problem, especially when a nuanced performance would be fundamental for a character that bottles up so much of his feelings. It’s pretty easy to fall in love with Ari and Dante, but the movie is only in love with the idea of them, neglecting quality time between the characters that would really make us feel like they've traveled through galaxies and beyond." Cary Darling of Houston Chronicle wrote "Aristotle and Dante" is a sweetly effective sketch of two souls adrift who find harbor with each other."

=== Accolades ===
Awards	Date of ceremony	Category	Recipient(s) and nominee(s)	Result	Ref.
Chlotrudis Society for Independent Films	March 14, 2024	Best Use of Music in a Film	—	Nominated	
Deauville American Film Festival	September 1–10, 2023	Grand Special Prize	Aitch Alberto	Nominated	
GLAAD Media Awards	May 12, 2024	Outstanding Film – Limited Release	—	Nominated	
Guild of Music Supervisors Awards	March 3, 2024	Best Music Supervision for Films Budgeted Under $10 Million	Adam Bennati	Nominated	
Miami Film Festival	March 10, 2023	Jordan Ressier First Feature Award	Aitch Alberto	Nominated	
Palm Springs International Film Festival	January 5–16, 2023	Directors to Watch	Aitch Alberto	Won	
Palm Springs International Film Festival	January 5–16, 2023	Grand Jury Prize – New Voices/New Visions	Aitch Alberto	Nominated	
