= Cassadaga (film) =

- Original film poster
- Directed by: Anthony DiBlasi
- Written by: Bruce Wood & Scott Poiley
- Produced by: Scott Poiley; Bruce Wood
- Starring: Kelen Coleman; Kevin Alejandro; Louise Fletcher; Amy LoCicero; Rus Blackwell; Sarah Sculco
- Cinematography: Jose Zambrano Cassella
- Edited by: Kristian Otero
- Music by: Dani Donadi
- Production company: Poiley Wood Entertainment
- Distributed by: Archstone Distribution
- Release date: October 22, 2011
- Running time: 113 minutes
- Country: United States
- Language: English
- Box office: $2,544

Cassadaga is a 2011 American independent horror thriller film directed by Anthony DiBlasi. The screenplay is the feature-length debut for co-writers Bruce Wood and Scott Poiley. The film stars Kelen Coleman, Kevin Alejandro, Louise Fletcher, Rus Blackwell, Hank Stone, J Larose, Amy LoCiero and Christina Bach.

The story revolves around Lily Morel (Kelen Coleman) trying to recover from her sister's tragic death. She is haunted by a murdered woman and ends up on a mission to solve her mysterious death. One thing leads to another and Lily finds herself at the mercy of a sociopath dubbed "Geppetto". Cassadaga had its World Premiere at the Mann Chinese Theater 6 in Hollywood, California on October 22, 2011, as part of the Screamfest Horror Film Festival.

== Plot ==
The film opens with a young boy wearing a dress while playing with a doll. He's discovered by his mother, who angrily destroys both the dress and the doll in front of him, bringing the boy to tears. This so traumatizes the boy that he castrates himself.

Cassadaga follows Lily (Kelen Coleman), a deaf woman who has traveled to Cassadaga, Florida in order to teach and grieve for her dead sister Michele (Sarah Sculco). She's also attending Cassadaga University on a scholarship provided by Claire (Louise Fletcher), who also allows her to live on her property with herself and her grandson Thomas (Lucas Beck). While staying in the town, she begins dating Mike (Kevin Alejandro), the divorced father of one of her students Haley (Rachel Durose). Lily ends up visiting a psychic (Avis-Marie Barnes) after one of Mike's friends suggests it, during which time she makes a brief connection with her sister's spirit but also receives a warning about a female spirit that has attached itself to her. Soon after Lily experiences a series of terrifying visions. Meanwhile, the young boy, now an adult, is shown to be a grisly murderer that turns his corpses into marionettes.

Lily then ends up meeting Christian (Rus Blackwell), while he's inspecting a greenhouse he built for Claire, during which time he informs her that Jennifer (Amy LoCicero), the last person who won Claire's scholarship, ended up going missing. The police suspected that Thomas had killed her, but were unable to find enough evidence to arrest him. Correctly suspecting that Jennifer is haunting her, Lily convinces Mike to help her search for clues. Together they discover evidence that shows that Thomas was stalking Jennifer prior to her disappearance and also learn that Lily is unable to leave town until she puts Jennifer's spirit to rest.

Mike ends up leaving Lily because his ex-wife is using Lily's strange behaviors (due to the haunting) as a way to gain full custody of Haley. This saddens and infuriates Lily, who knocks over paintings she'd been making of her visions. Through this action she realizes that her visions have been of Claire's greenhouse. She investigates the building and finds both drugs and Jennifer's corpse. Lily is attacked by Thomas, who is promptly arrested by police arriving on the scene. While he is arrested for both the drugs and Jennifer's murder, the police discover that Thomas is not the killer. One officer, Officer Hall (Lucius Baston), goes to interview Christian, who he quickly deduces is the true murderer.

Christian murders the officer and abducts Lily, who he plans on turning into his next marionette. Lily initially manages to escape her captor and flee using a car, but is distracted and causes a car crash. As Christian approaches Lily, Jennifer appears in front of Christian, giving Lily the opportunity to attack him with a pair of scissors he dropped. This causes her to see a vision of her sister, signifying that she has come to terms with Michele's death.

== Cast ==
- Kelen Coleman as Lily
- Kevin Alejandro as Mike
- Louise Fletcher as Claire
- Lucas Beck as Thomas
- Amy LoCicero as Jennifer
- Rus Blackwell as Christian Burton
- Sarah Sculco as Michele
- Lucius Baston as Officer Bill Hall
- Christina Bach as Gabriella
- Hank Stone as Maxwell
- J. LaRose as Heath
- Randy Molnar as Professor Randall
- Beth Marshall as Amity & Corrie
- Rachel Durose as Haley
- Avis-Marie Barnes as Susan
- Carlos Navarro as Todd
- Amy Dionne as Cherise (as Amy Hicks-Bevly)
- Janine Klein as Mother
- Garrett Boyle as Boy
- Beth Marshall as Amity / Corrie
- Dennis Neal as Detective Hubbard
- Randy Molnar as Professor Randall

== Production ==
Writer/producer Bruce Wood says that he was fascinated with the town of Cassadaga when he was a child and felt compelled to use the location in a film after discovering that no films had yet to utilize the location. While writing, Wood had the basic outline of the character “Geppetto” but it wasn't until he was at the gym and thought up the shocking opening sequence that he discovered why “Geppetto” was the way he was; “in that moment I saw him as a child, I knew this character and what motivated him.”

Lee Grimes was in charge of the special effects make-up. Director Anthony DiBlasi chose this script because he wanted to do a horror film where “there were characters in that I thought people could relate to and feel bad for when things happen to them”. Oscar winner Louise Fletcher wanted to be in the movie because both her parents were deaf, just like the main character Lily. The actor playing “Geppetto” was kept a complete secret until opening night.

== Reception ==
Critical reception for Cassadaga has been negative and the film holds a rating of 18% on Rotten Tomatoes, based on 11 reviews.

The film received praise from outlets like Dread Central and ShockYa, the former of which wrote that "while not a perfect film, the flick does have a freshly unique voice and is one which more than likely genre fans will want to sink their teeth into." In contrast, media outlets like Variety and The New York Times panned the film. The Village Voice and Bloody Disgusting also panned Cassadaga, with Bloody Disgusting writing that "Cassadaga has multiple points of potential, however, we end up with a story that is like a puppet with multiple puppeteers that simply cannot work in sync with each other."
