= Aristotle and Dante Discover the Secrets of the Universe =

2012 young adult novel by Benjamin Alire Sáenz

- Author: Benjamin Alire Sáenz
- Cover artist: Chloë Foglia (cover designer, Simon & Schuster); Sarah J. Coleman (lettering and illustration)
- Language: English
- Subject: Family secrets, Mexican American identity, heteronormativity, sexual orientation, masculinity, friendship
- Genre: Young adult, Bildungsroman
- Publisher: Simon & Schuster Books for Young Readers
- Publication date: February 21, 2012
- Publication place: United States
- Pages: 392
- Awards: Stonewall Book Award, 2013; Lambda Literary Award, 2013; Honor Book, Michael L. Printz Award, 2013; Pura Belpré Author Award, 2013
- OCLC: 666867878
- LC Class: PZ7.S1273 Ar 2012

Aristotle and Dante Discover the Secrets of the Universe is a coming-of-age young adult novel by American author Benjamin Alire Sáenz which was first published February 21, 2012. Set in El Paso, Texas in 1987, the novel follows two Mexican-American teenagers, Aristotle "Ari" Mendoza and Dante Quintana, their friendship, and their struggles with racial and ethnic identity, sexuality, and family relationships. Since its publication, the novel has received widespread critical acclaim and numerous accolades.

A sequel, titled Aristotle and Dante Dive into the Waters of the World, was published on October 12, 2021. A film adaptation, Aristotle and Dante Discover the Secrets of the Universe, written and directed by Aitch Alberto, premiered on September 9, 2022.

== Plot ==
In the summer of 1987, 15-year-old Aristotle Mendoza meets a boy named Dante Quintana at the local pool. The boys bond over their classical names (Aristotle is named after Greek philosopher Aristotle and Dante is named after Italian poet Dante Alighieri) and eventually become inseparable. Dante teaches Ari about literature and poetry, while Ari is fascinated by Dante's swimming ability and sincerity.

Dante tells Ari that he and his family are moving to Chicago for the next school term because his father was offered a temporary professorship at the University of Chicago. That same day, the two boys see a bird lying injured in the road. When Dante goes into the road to check on the bird, a car speeds around the corner. Ari dives into the street and pushes Dante out of its path, saving his life. While Dante leaves almost unscathed, Ari is hurt very badly. Following the accident, the Quintanas and the Mendozas grow closer.

Before Dante leaves for Chicago, he tells Ari the two things he loves most in the world are swimming and Ari. However, Ari says he should not tell him those things, even if they are true. The two boys promise each other they will still be friends when Dante returns in the summer.

Over the next year, Dante sends Ari several letters detailing his life in Chicago and struggling with his sexuality. Ari learns to drive, romantically pursues a girl from school, and searches for answers to his questions about his brother Bernardo, who is in prison for reasons no one in his family will discuss.

The next summer, Dante convinces Ari to kiss him as an experiment. It becomes increasingly clear Dante is in love with Ari, who appears not to reciprocate Dante's feelings for him.

Ari's father announces his Aunt Ophelia has had a fatal stroke. At the funeral, Ari realizes none of his extended family is there. He is told they disapproved of Aunt Ophelia having lived with another woman for many years. After the funeral, Ari's mother explains that Ari's brother, Bernardo, was arrested for the murder of a prostitute he hired when he was 15 years old. When Bernardo found out the prostitute was transgender, he killed her with his bare fists.

When Ari returns home, Mr. Quintana tells him Dante is in the hospital. He was jumped by several young men who had seen him kissing his coworker Daniel in an alley. Ari tracks down Julian, one of the boys who attacked Dante, at the body shop where he works and starts a fight with him. Mr. Quintana asks if Ari knows why Dante was jumped. Ari tells him Dante is gay and was kissing another boy. Mr. Quintana admits he'd guessed the truth because of the way Dante looks at Ari, while Mrs. Quintana tells Ari she thinks Dante is in love with him and Daniel is just a stand-in for Ari.

Ari's mother eventually calls a family meeting, where Ari finally accepts he is as much in love with Dante as Dante is with him. That night, the two families go bowling together. After bowling, Dante and Ari go out into the desert, where Ari kisses Dante, fully accepting his love for him. Now free of his fears, Ari is left wondering: "How could I have ever been ashamed of loving Dante Quintana?"

== Themes ==
Several themes feature prominently in Aristotle and Dante. These include Mexican-American identity, gender and sexuality, particular masculine gender roles and homosexuality, intellectualism and artistic expression, as well as family relationships and friendship.

== Critical reception ==
Aristotle and Dante Discover the Secrets of the Universe was well received by critics, including starred reviews from Kirkus Reviews and School Library Journal.

Kirkus Reviews wrote that "Meticulous pacing and finely nuanced characters underpin the author's gift for affecting prose that illuminates the struggles within relationships".

A Publishers Weekly review called it "a tender, honest exploration of identity and sexuality, and a passionate reminder that love—whether romantic or familial—should be open, free, and without shame."

In an interview with NPR, Sáenz himself noted that "I've never had a book with this kind of response, not ever".

The audiobook, narrated by Lin-Manuel Miranda, also received a starred review from Booklist's Cheryl Ward, who noted that "Miranda does justice with his quiet, intricate narration". Ward conceded that "Occasional lengthy pauses at chapter ends may be distracting, but this production flaw does not detract from the artistry of the sparse prose and measured pace".

== Awards and honors ==
Aristotle and Dante Discover the Secrets of the Universe is a Junior Library Guild book.

In 2012, Kirkus Reviews and School Library Journal included it on their list of the year's best books.

In 2013, the American Library Association included it on their top ten list of the year's Best Fiction for Young Adults, as well as on their Rainbow List. The Association for Library Service to Children included it on their 2013 list of Notable Children's Books.

Booklist included the audiobook on the following lists: Booklist Editors' Choice: Audio for Youth (2013), "Top 10 Multicultural Fiction on Audio" (2015), "Top 10 LGBTQ on Audio" (2015), and "Top 10 Oscar Nominees on Audio" (2019).

Awards for Aristotle and Dante Discover the Secrets of the Universe
Year	Award	Result	Ref.
2013	Amelia Elizabeth Walden Award	Finalist	
2013	Lambda Literary Award for Children's and Young Adult Literature	Winner	
2013	Michael L. Printz Award	Honor	
2013	Pura Belpré Narrative Medal for Latino fiction	Winner	
2013	Stonewall Book Award	Winner	

== Sequel ==
Sáenz announced in 2016 that there would be a sequel titled There Will Be Other Summers. In 2020, Sáenz tweeted that he had finished it, but had changed the title. In February 2021, it was announced that the sequel would be published by Simon and Schuster with the title Aristotle and Dante Dive into the Waters of the World. The book was published on October 12, 2021.

== Adaptations ==
An audiobook version of the novel was released in April 2013. Read by Lin-Manuel Miranda, it has a total running time of 7 hours and 29 minutes.

Plans for the book to be adapted for the screen began in 2016, and were in motion by 2018 with filmmaker Aitch Alberto penning the script. In October 2021, it was announced that the film adaptation of the novel would be directed by Alberto in her directorial debut, and would star Max Pelayo and Reese Gonzales as the titular characters, along with Eugenio Derbez, Eva Longoria, Verónica Falcón, Isabella Gomez, Luna Blaise, and Kevin Alejandro. Filming took place from October to November 2021, and the film had its premiere on September 9, 2022 at the 47th International Toronto Film Festival.

== Censorship ==
In April 2025, the Lukashenko regime added the book to the list of printed publications containing information messages and materials, the distribution of which could harm the national interests of Belarus. This is presumably because of the gay themes in the book as Lukashenko is involved in the suppression of gay rights in Belarus.

== See also ==
- Chicano literature
