= Missionary (film) =

- Directed by: Anthony DiBlasi
- Written by: Bruce Wood, Scott Poiley
- Starring: Dawn Olivieri; Mitch Ryan; J. LaRose; Kip Pardue
- Cinematography: Austin F. Schmidt
- Edited by: Anthony DiBlasi
- Music by: Dani Donadi
- Production companies: Poiley Wood Entertainment, Missionary Film Production
- Distributed by: Freestyle Releasing
- Release date: July 25, 2013 (Fantasia Int'l Film Festival)
- Running time: 90 minutes
- Country: United States
- Language: English

Missionary is a 2013 drama thriller film by Anthony DiBlasi. It received its world premiere on July 25, 2013 at the Fantasia International Film Festival and stars Dawn Olivieri as a single mother caught up in one man's obsession with her.

== Plot summary ==
Katherine is a mother trying to raise her son Kesley the best she can, despite being recently separated from her husband Ian. When Mormon missionary Elder Kevin Brock offers to help her son practice football, both he and Katherine are drawn to one another. Despite some worries about the 10 year age difference between the two of them, Katherine and Kevin are initially happy in their blossoming relationship. It takes a sour turn when Katherine decides to try to work things out with her estranged husband, which doesn't sit well with Kevin. Already a little mentally unstable, Kevin's warped mind tries to use his religion to justify making Katherine his... forever.

== Cast ==
- Dawn Olivieri as Katherine Kingsman
- Mitch Ryan as Kevin Brock
- Kip Pardue as Ian Kingsman
- J. LaRose as Sergeant "Sarge" Powell
- Connor Christie as Kesley Kingsman
- Jordan Woods-Robinson as Alan Whitehall
- Randy Molnar as President Andersen
- Danielle Kimberley as April Britton
- Dushawn Moses as Dr. West
- Jesse Malinowski as Elder Lillejord
- Jeff Chase as Brian
- Mary Lankford Poiley as Crystal (credited as Mary Lankford)

== Reception ==
Critical reception for Missionary has been mixed to positive, and Dread Central called the movie an "exemplary specimen of human horror done right.". Part of the film's criticism stemmed from the movie's familiarity to other films in the stalker/slasher genre, but Fearnet noted that "You know most of what Missionary has in store before you hit play, but the final product is still a well-crafted and efficient little thriller." Several reviewers brought up concerns about whether or not the film would be considered offensive to people and Empire Online commented that DiBlasi and crew were "careful not to demonise the entire religion, and [took] time to make its elders likeably normal". Bloody Disgusting gave the film a positive review and wrote that "DiBlasi has crafted a tightly wound downward spiral of infidelity, violence, and small-town adversity that’s a model of restraint."
