= Donadi (surname) =

Donadi is an Italian surname. Notable people with the surname include:

- Dani Donadi (born 1967), Italian film composer and record producer
- Massimo Donadi (born 1963), Italian politician

== See also ==
- Donati
