= Most Likely to Die =

- Directed by: Anthony DiBlasi
- Written by: Laura Brennan
- Produced by: Margaret H. Huddleston; Hannah Pillemer; Suzanne Lyons; Michael Tarzian
- Starring: Heather Morris; Ryan Doom; Perez Hilton; Chad Addison; Tess Christiansen; Marci Miller; Tatum Miranda; Johnny Ramey; Skyler Vallo; Jake Busey
- Cinematography: Timothy A. Burton
- Edited by: Anthony DiBlasi
- Music by: Adam Barber
- Production company: Snowfall Films
- Distributed by: Marvista Entertainment
- Release dates: August 30, 2015 (FrightFest); May 13, 2016 (US)
- Running time: 80 minutes
- Country: United States
- Language: English

Most Likely to Die is a 2015 American slasher film directed by Anthony DiBlasi. The film stars Heather Morris, Ryan Doom, Perez Hilton, Tatum Miranda, and Jake Busey. It premiered at the London FrightFest Film Festival and was released in the United States on May 13, 2016. A masked killer, known as The Graduate, stalks and murders their classmates at their ten-year reunion.

== Plot ==
The story begins with a woman named Ashley driving her car up the hills to the house of her boyfriend Ray, a former professional hockey player who was recently cut from his team. Ashley arrives at the house but Ray is nowhere to be found, and she discovers several threatening messages throughout the house. She flees down a path through the desert but is caught in a trap and dragged into a shed.

Later, Gaby arrives to the house and is greeted by Ray's housekeeper Tarkin, who freaks her out with his strange behavior. Gaby finds the faces of her and her friends put up on a wall, but is disturbed to see that Ashley's face has been crossed out in red paint. The others - Freddie, Jade, DJ, Lamont, and Simone - arrive to help Gaby plan their 10-year high school reunion. Gaby is angry to learn her ex-boyfriend Brad, now a famous actor, is coming to the reunion, after he had abandoned Gaby when she became pregnant in high school. The group play poker and discuss a boy named John Dougherty, whom they all played a cruel prank on in school by crossing his picture out of the yearbook and writing "Most likely to die" underneath it. John was later caught with a gun in his locker and expelled before being sent to juvenile hall. Brad arrives with his girlfriend Bella, and tensions rise between him and Gaby. Tarkin spies on Bella changing into her swimsuit, and he is suddenly strangled to death by a figure wearing a graduation cap, gown, and a paper mache mask.

The group eventually notices that Ray and Ashley are missing and split up to search for them. Gaby discovers Ashley's dead body in the shack with her throat slit and wrapped in Christmas lights. The lights also spell Ashley. (Ashley was Most Likely to Have Her Name Up In Lights). Everyone comes down to the shack to investigate except for Simone, who stays alone in the house. Lamont decides to take his car to go and find help, but while driving down the mountain his car dies and he is forced to continue on foot. Simone, alone in the house, is attacked and murdered by the graduate. The others return to the house and find their cars have all been damaged, leaving them stranded. They find Simone's body floating in the hot tub and realize the graduate is killing all of them according to the things they were voted most likely to do in their high school yearbooks. (Simone was Most Likely To Get What She Wants and stated earlier she wanted to spend the rest of her life in the hot tub.) Bella becomes convinced the entire thing is a hoax by Brad, and she and DJ leave the house to check to see if Ashley and Simone are actually dead.

The graduate attacks Brad and stabs him, but he is saved by Gaby. Bella runs back into the house in a panic, but is decapitated by the graduate before she can reveal what happened to DJ. Jade rescues Gaby by shooting at the graduate, but when Gaby takes the gun and tries to follow him, the graduate kidnaps and ties Jade up before tricking Gaby into shooting her in the chest, leaving as Jade dies in Gaby's arms. (Jade was Most Likely to Break Hearts.)

Lamont eventually becomes lost walking through the desert and stumbles upon an unconscious DJ, who claims Ray attacked him. Lamont helps DJ up, but DJ suddenly kills him by slashing his forehead with a utility blade, force feeds him a hockey stick and then slits his throat with the utility blade . (Lamont was Most Likely To Eat Anything). DJ returns to the house and reveals himself as the killer, revealing he has been keeping Ray tied up. DJ exposits that Ray had forced DJ to plant the gun in John Dougherty's locker to keep Ray from getting in too much trouble for the yearbook prank. DJ rekindled his friendship with John several years later, but when DJ revealed what he had done in an attempt to make amends, John supposedly committed suicide. DJ now wants to kill all of his other friends as vengeance for destroying John's entire life, and plans to frame Ray for the murders. He offers to let Gaby and Freddie live if they help him murder the rest of their class at the reunion, and if Gaby kills Brad. Gaby pretends to agree and non-fatally stabs Brad, before taking the gun from DJ and shooting him to death. (DJ was Most Likely To Have The Last Laugh. After his death Gaby states: "Who's got the last laugh now, motherfucker.")

Gaby, Brad, Freddie, and Ray escape the house and leave. As the film ends, an unknown figure wearing a graduation robe enters the house and picks the mask up off of DJ's dead body and puts it on their own face - it is heavily implied to be the spirit of (or the actual) John Dougherty.

== Cast ==
- Heather Morris as Gaby
- Ryan Doom as Brad Campbell
- Perez Hilton as Freddie
- Chad Addison as DJ
- Tess Christiansen as Jade McKinnon
- Marci Miller as Simone Venice
- Tatum Miranda as Bella Mitchell
- Johnny Ramey as Lamont
- Skyler Vallo as Ashley Nicole
- Jake Busey as Tarkin
- Jason Tobias as Ray Yoder

== Production ==
Director Anthony DiBlasi's agent introduced him to two of the producers, who were looking for a director with horror film experience. DiBlasi, who had always wanted to make an old-school slasher film, jumped at the chance, saying that he enjoyed the script's 1990s-era feel. Morris was the producers' choice, which DiBlasi agreed with. Hilton, who was an actor before he became famous as a blogger, was cast when the producers looked to recruit internet talent.

== Release ==
Most Likely to Die premiered at the London FrightFest Film Festival on August 30, 2015. It was released in the United States on May 13, 2016.

== Reception ==
Noel Murray of the Los Angeles Times wrote, "Though slickly produced and competently acted, the movie mostly just follows a formula." Ken W. Hanley of Fangoria rated it 2/4 stars and wrote that the film "is held back by its own limited ambition" despite the charm of its slasher premise. Drew Tinnin of Dread Central rated it 2.5/5 stars and called it "a fun send-up of the slasher genre that, although entertaining, fails to reach the top of the class". In recommending audiences wait for it stream for free, Patrick Cooper of Bloody Disgusting rated it 2/5 stars and called it "a no-frills slasher story that's light on plot and character development". Zach Hollwedel of Under the Radar rated it 2/10 stars and wrote, "Most Likely to Die is the epitome of the uninspired low-budget slasher."
