= Kelen Coleman =

American actress (born 1984)

- Born: April 19, 1984 (age 42); Nashville, Tennessee, U.S.
- Education: UNC-Chapel Hill
- Occupation: Actress
- Years active: 2008–present
- Father: T. Michael Coleman

Kelen Coleman (born April 19, 1984) is an American actress.

== Early life ==
Coleman was born in Nashville, Tennessee, on April 19, 1984. She grew up in Potomac, Maryland and graduated from University of North Carolina at Chapel Hill. Her father is bluegrass musician T. Michael Coleman. Her mother is Jewish, her father is Christian.

== Filmography ==
=== Film ===
Year	Title	Role	Notes
2009	Fired Up!	Maddy	
2009	The Marc Pease Experience	Stephanie	
2011	Children of the Corn: Genesis	Allie	
2011	Dorfman in Love	Molly	
2011	Cassadaga	Lily	
2012	The Polterguys	Jo Branson	
2013	A True Story	Karen	
2015	The Night Is Young	Amy	
2016	Better Off Single	Lorelei	
2016	Flock of Dudes	Krista	
2016	Dirty 30	Claire	
2016	True Memoirs of an International Assassin	Kylie Applebaum	
2020	Breaking Them Up	Laurie Cross	

=== Television ===
Year	Title	Role	Notes
2008	CSI: NY	Natalie Gerrard	Episode: "Admissions"
2009	The Big D	Leigh Ann	TV film
2009–2010	The Office	Isabel Poreba	Episodes: "Niagara", "The Delivery: Part 2", "Happy Hour"
2010	100 Questions	Kate	Episode: "Are You Open Minded?"
2010	Playing with Guns	Big Al	TV film
2012	Hart of Dixie	Presley	Episodes: "Walkin' After Midnight", "I Walk the Line"
2012	Rizzoli & Isles	Juliet Randall	Episode: "Love the Way You Lie"
2012	Brothers-In-Law	Cheska	TV film
2012–13	The Mindy Project	Alex	Recurring role (season 1)
2012–13	The Newsroom	Lisa Lambert	Recurring role (seasons 1–2)
2013	CollegeHumor Originals	Snow White / Ashley	3 episodes
2013	Super Fun Night	Felicity Vanderstone	Episode: "Pilot"
2013	Betas	Olivia	Episode: "Lowdown"
2014	Men at Work	Jude	Recurring role (season 3)
2014	Californication	Hope	Episode: "Grace"
2014	Scandal	Kate	Episode: "Randy, Red, Superfreak and Julia"
2014–17	BoJack Horseman	Various (voice)	Episodes: "Zoës and Zeldas", "See Mr. Peanutbutter Run", "The Judge", "lovin that cali lifestyle!!"
2014–15	The McCarthys	Jackie McCarthy	Main role
2015	Hot in Cleveland	Andie	Episode: "Duct Soup"
2016	Young & Hungry	Amanda	Episodes: "Young & Hawaii", "Young & Hurricane"
2016	The Bellmen	Kelly	TV film
2017	The Great Indoors	Natasha	Episode: "Friends Like These"
2017, 2019	Big Little Lies	Harper Stimson	Recurring role
2017–18	Me, Myself & I	Abby	Main role
2018	The 5th Quarter	Patty	Episode: "A Lift of Their Own"
2018	The Ranch	Megan	Episode: "It's All Wrong, But It's All Right"
2019–2020	How to Get Away with Murder	Chloe Millstone	6 episodes
2021	Superstore	Megan	Episode: "Perfect Store"
2021	Magnum P.I.	Gina Gow	Episode: "Dark Harvest"
2022	The Afterparty	Tatiana	Episode: "Danner"
2026	Georgie & Mandy's First Marriage	Kathy	Episode: "A Stuffed Monkey and an Ex-Girlfriend"
