= Penny Dreadful (film) =

- Film poster
- Directed by: Richard Brandes
- Screenplay by: Diane Doniol-Valcroze; Arthur K. Flam (as Arthur Flam); Richard Brandes
- Story by: Diane Doniol-Valcroze; Arthur K. Flam (as Arthur Flam)
- Produced by: Richard Brandes; Braxton Pope; Andrew Weiner
- Starring: Rachel Miner; Mimi Rogers; Mickey Jones; Michael Berryman
- Cinematography: Joplin Wu
- Edited by: Ben Le Vine
- Music by: Steve Gurevitch
- Distributed by: Freestyle Releasing; After Dark Films
- Release date: November 18, 2006
- Running time: 92 min
- Country: United States
- Language: English

Penny Dreadful is a 2006 American horror film directed by Richard Brandes and written by Diane Doniol-Valcroze, Arthur K. Flam (as Arthur Flam), and Richard Brandes. The story is from Diane Doniol-Valcroze and Arthur K. Flam (as Arthur Flam). The film centers on a young woman, Penny, who has a phobia of cars and ends up stalked by a maniac hitchhiker preying on her fear. The film takes place almost entirely in a car, one-location. In 2016, the film was listed in the top ten horror films of 2006 by 411mania.

== Plot ==
Penny, a young woman traumatized by a childhood auto accident that killed her parents, accompanies her therapist, Orianna, on a road trip to a mountain community as part of her therapy to overcome her fear of cars. On the way, Orianna hits — but does not seriously injure — a hitchhiker, whom she then offers a ride. The hitchhiker is silent during the ride, except to point out his destination.

After dropping off the hitchhiker, they discover that he has punctured one of the tires. Orianna sets off to get a reception for her cell phone but fails to return. Penny goes off to find Orianna but trips and falls, having injured her ankle earlier. When she wakes up, she's back in the car, which has been wedged between two trees. Orianna, whose death has been recorded on a video camera, is beside her. Penny tries to call for help, but the hitchhiker continues to terrorize and torture her. Several people who live and work nearby are killed by the hitchhiker when they attempt to help her or get in his way.

Penny is tortured for another few hours, and when she tries to crawl out of the car window, the hitchhiker grabs her right foot and cuts off one of her toes. After finally falling asleep, she turns around to find the hitchhiker sitting in the back wearing Orianna's clothes, who then pulls off the hood (revealed to be a demented female mental patient) and tries to strangle her while saying, "Don't forget your breathing exercises, Penny." She manages to fight off the hitchhiker by stabbing her in the eye with a pencil and escapes from the car, only to trip over her injured foot. The hitchhiker finds her and tries to attack, but a man driving a pick-up truck drives past in time to hit the hitchhiker. The hitchhiker appears to be dead at this point, and the truck driver is panicking. He tells Penny to wait in the vehicle while he assists the hitchhiker. Penny feels a bit of relief as she watches the man and the dead hitchhiker. But terror boils up when she realizes the hitchhiker is still moving.

== Cast ==
Actor/Actress	Character
Rachel Miner	Penny Deerborn
Mimi Rogers	Orianna Volkes
Michael Berryman	Gas Station Attendant
Lucy Rogers-Ciaffa	Young Penny
Elyse Marie Mirto	Mother
Liz Davies	Hitchhiker
Mickey Jones	Eddie
Chad Todhunter	Alvin
Tammy Filor	Mary Saunders
Casey Sander	Truck Driver

== Release ==
The film's production was announced in April, 2005 by The Hollywood Reporter. The film debuted as one of the 8 Films To Die For in the first After Dark Horrorfest in 2006, released theatrically nationwide on November 18, 2006. The DVD was released on March 27, 2007, by Lionsgate and After Dark Films.
