= Better Off Single =

2016 film

- Film poster
- Directed by: Benjamin Cox
- Written by: Benjamin Cox
- Produced by: Tracey Becker; Benjamin Cox
- Starring: Aaron Tveit; Abby Elliott; Lauren Miller Rogen; Kal Pen; Shane McRae; Kelen Coleman
- Cinematography: Igor Kropotov
- Edited by: Benjamin Cox
- Music by: Kenneth Burgomaster
- Production company: Red Square Pictures
- Distributed by: Gravitas Ventures
- Release date: October 7, 2016
- Country: United States
- Language: English

Better Off Single (alternatively titled Stereotypically You) is a 2016 American romantic-comedy film written and directed by Benjamin Cox. The film stars Aaron Tveit, Abby Elliott, Lauren Miller Rogen, Kal Penn, Shane McRae, and Kelen Coleman.

The film was released on October 7, 2016 by Gravitas Ventures.

== Cast ==
- Aaron Tveit as Charlie
- Abby Elliott as Angela
- Lauren Miller Rogen as Kathy
- Kal Penn as Brice
- Shane McRae as Vince
- Kelen Coleman as Lorelei
- Jessica Rothe as Mary
- Haviland Morris as Angela's Mom

== Release ==
The film, originally titled Stereotypically You, was released by Gravitas Ventures on October 7, 2016.

== Reception ==
Gary Goldstein of The Los Angeles Times negatively reviewed the film and said "With its muddy timeline, kaleidoscope of fantasies, flashbacks and hallucinations, broad characterizations and sitcom slickness, the film never settles down long enough to congeal, much less feel remotely connected to reality." Morgan Rojas of Cinemacy also reviewed the film poorly, stating "Better Off Single seems to just fall a bit short of what it has set out to achieve."
