= Chamber play =

Play performed with a small cast in a small space

A chamber play is a play of usually three acts which can be performed with a small cast and practically no sets or costumes in a small space. The form became popular in the early 20th century, with leading exponents being Max Reinhardt and August Strindberg. The first cinema adaptation was Kammerspielfilm in the 1920s, and the format was later adapted for cinema by Ingmar Bergman and Carl Theodor Dreyer.

The name is derived from the term chamber music.

== See also ==
- Bottle episode
- Closet drama
- Drawing room play
- List of films set in a single location
