= Big Top Evil =

- Directed by: Sean Haitz
- Written by: John Morrisey and Sean Haitz
- Starring: Sean Haitz; Bill Moseley; J. Larose
- Release date: 2019
- Running time: 81 minutes
- Country: United States
- Language: English

Big Top Evil is a 2019 American horror film written by John Morrisey and Sean Haitz, directed by Haitz and starring Haitz, Bill Moseley and J. Larose.

The plot centers on Jay, on trial for murder and given a re-trial. He had been one of five friends out on a road trip when they encountered and were chased by a group of cannibal clowns. Jay was the only survivor and held responsible for the others' deaths; no bodies were found, having been devoured by the clowns.

== Cast ==
- Bill Moseley as Mr. Kharver
- J. Larose as Roadside Jack
- Sean Haitz as Jay
- Chanté Demoustes as Veronica
- Jisaura Cardinale as Casey
- Cameron Hall as Scott
- Morgan Ferreira as Donny
- Grace Haitz as Kate
- Chris Potter as Trevor
- Austin Judd as Candy
- David Vega as Bellevue Bob

== Reception ==
Bobby LePire of Film Threat rated the film a 7 out of 10.
