= Everything Begins and Ends at the Kentucky Club =

2012 short story collection by Benjamin Alire Sáenz

- Author: Benjamin Alire Sáenz
- Language: English
- Genre: Short stories, Chicano literature
- Published: Cinco Puntos Press
- Publication place: United States
- Pages: 222
- Awards: PEN/Faulkner Award for Fiction (2013); Lambda Literary Award for Gay Fiction (2013); Stonewall Honor (2014)

Everything Begins and Ends at the Kentucky Club is a collection of short stories by Benjamin Alire Sáenz, published in 2012 by Cinco Puntos Press.

The book compiles seven short stories, all set in the Hispanic/Latino community in El Paso, Texas in the United States and its neighbouring city of Juárez, Chihuahua in Mexico.

The Kentucky Club, a real-life bar a few blocks south of the border crossing in Juárez, appears in all seven stories as a linking motif. In addition, all seven stories touch in some way on themes of survival, of trying to live through pain, grief and loss and of the struggle to find and maintain love, both within the protagonists' birth families and in their sexual or romantic relationships. Several also touch on the outbreak of violent crime that engulfed Juárez in the 1990s, and the ways in which that fractured the interrelated cross-border culture of the two cities.

== Contents ==
Story	Originally published in
"He Has Gone to Be with the Women"	Narrative
"The Art of Translation"	
"The Rule Maker"	
"Brother in Another Language"	
"Sometimes the Rain"	11/11
"Chasing the Dragon"	
"The Hurting Game"	

== Synopsis ==
=== "He Has Gone to Be with the Women" ===
Juan Carlos, a Chicano writer, and Javier, a Mexican consulate chauffeur, meet and start a relationship, frequently meeting at Juan Carlos' home in Sunset Heights. They talk about literature and their families often. Javier sometimes cuts theirs visits short as he has to spend time with his terminally ill uncle at the nearby hospital. After his uncle dies, the two men become closer.

After a few months, Juan Carlos asks Javier to move in with him, fearful Javier will become a victim of the violence in Juárez; Javier refuses. When Javier fails to show up for a date, Juan Carlos learns from friends that Javier has been kidnapped and has "disappeared." Juan Carlos spends months searching for any information but is ultimately unsuccessful.

One day, he receives a call from mutual friends Magda and Sofia regarding a watch of Javier that was found before his disappearance. They tell him to end his search as Javier has "gone to be with the women," a reference to Javier's mother who suffered a terrible fate in the desert. Juan Carlos soon leaves, ending up at the Kentucky Club.

=== "The Art of Translation" ===
In 1985, Nick Guerra is released from the hospital in El Paso after being treated for assault wounds and returns to living with his parents. The media tries to obtain his story but Nick is reclusive; he only goes out of the house for his job as a waiter and to run in the desert. He spends most of his time reading, relearning English and Spanish words, and translating those words between languages.

One day after work, he decides to go to a bar called the Regal Beagle; there, he meets Sylvia, a woman much older than him. They talk, and eventually they decide to go to the Kentucky Club before finally ending up at her apartment. Before they proceed to have sex, Nick tells her that he is open to anything except taking off this T-shirt. The morning after, she asks if he wants her phone number. He says yes, but ultimately refuses when she inquires about his back; he leaves her place on bad terms.

A week later, they run into each other again at the Regal Beagle and make up. They have sex again at her place but do not "make love." When she tries to remove his T-shirt, he steadfastly refuses. He leaves on worse terms than before. When he arrives home, he lays in bed thinking of English and Spanish words and phrases before falling asleep. When he awakes the next morning, he tries to come to terms with what happened when he was attacked: while the perpetrators were "writing" with a knife on his back, he should have "embraced it." He finally realize that he has to translate his deadpan life back into the world of the living.

=== "The Rule Maker" ===
Maximiliano "Max" Gonzalez McDonald lives with his mother in Juárez. When he is ten, his mother takes him to El Paso to live with his father and disappears from his life. Max learns to live with his father who is a drug dealer by making a list of rules, the most important ones being to make straight A's at school and to never enter his father's room; his father is the "rule maker" and he is the "rule follower." His father provides for all his needs throughout his entire teenaged life. While Max is told to never do drugs, his father encourages him to casually drink.

When his father takes a several-week-long trip when Max is sixteen, Max is told to research universities that he wants to attend. As time passes, he applies and is admitted into his top-choice school Georgetown, but his father starts to develop a severe drug addiction and even hosts a party at the house. When one of the invitees tries to offer Max drugs, his father beats the man. A few weeks before Max is set to move, he tells his father to stop doing drugs; his father reacts by socking him in the face. The day before he is set to drive off to Washington, D.C., his father buys him a Prius and takes him to the Kentucky Club. At the bar, his father tells him that he loved Max's mother. Sometime during his studies, Max is asked to come home by his father's lawyer because his father overdosed and is on a respirator; he plans to take his father off life support. Before heading back, he tells his girlfriend Emma that his father's name is Eddie and that his father saved his life.

=== "Sometimes the Rain" ===
On the morning before a graduation party, Ernesto "Neto" Zaragoza smokes and listen to music at the river before attending the celebration that night. There, he encounters Brian Stillman and they reflect on their nasty relationship during high school. Before going their separate ways, Brian apologizes to Neto about the way he treated him. At the party that night, Neto talks to his ex-girlfriend and drinks beer before he overhears Brian and Jorge having sex. Afterwards, he also hears that Jorge's mother is sick and finds himself fantasizing of the two young men that night when he returns home.

Neto attends the University of New Mexico on a scholarship. During his first summer back, he works two jobs. While his parents are out of town attending a funeral, he sees Brian beaten up while driving down Highway 478. Neto forces Brian into his car before helping him at his parents' house; Neto learns that Brian's father is abusive while bandaging him. They talk and joke about how both of their fathers probably went to the same bad "father school." Later, they decide to get drinks at the Kentucky Club as they talk about what it means to be a man. They then head back to Neto's parents' house, where Brian spends the night. The following day after work, Neto indefinitely loans Brian $500 to escape to Denver, away from his abusive father. After an argument regarding taking the money during a rainy night, Brian agrees. Before departing, Brian confesses to Neto about his relationship with Jorge; Neto responds by saying that he knows and it does not change how he feels about Brian.

About a year later, Neto receives a letter from Brian with $500. He learns that Brian has joined the Army and is currently stationed in Da Nang; at the end of the letter, Brian confesses his love for Neto. Shortly afterwards, Brian dies saving one of his buddies in a village. Neto and Jorge meet shortly after Brian's funeral; Jorge recounts how he wanted to tell Brian's father he loved his son but did not and how he knew Brian loved Neto. Years later, Neto returns to the desert on a rainy night and wistfully screams "Brian Stillman" repeatedly as if it was a song.

== Awards ==
The book won the PEN/Faulkner Award for Fiction in 2013, making Sáenz the first Latino writer ever to win the award, and also won a Lambda Literary Award in the Gay Fiction category at the 2013 Lambda Literary Awards. It was also named at a 2014 Stonewall Honor Book by the American Library Association.
