= Chad Rook =

Canadian actor, director, writer, and producer

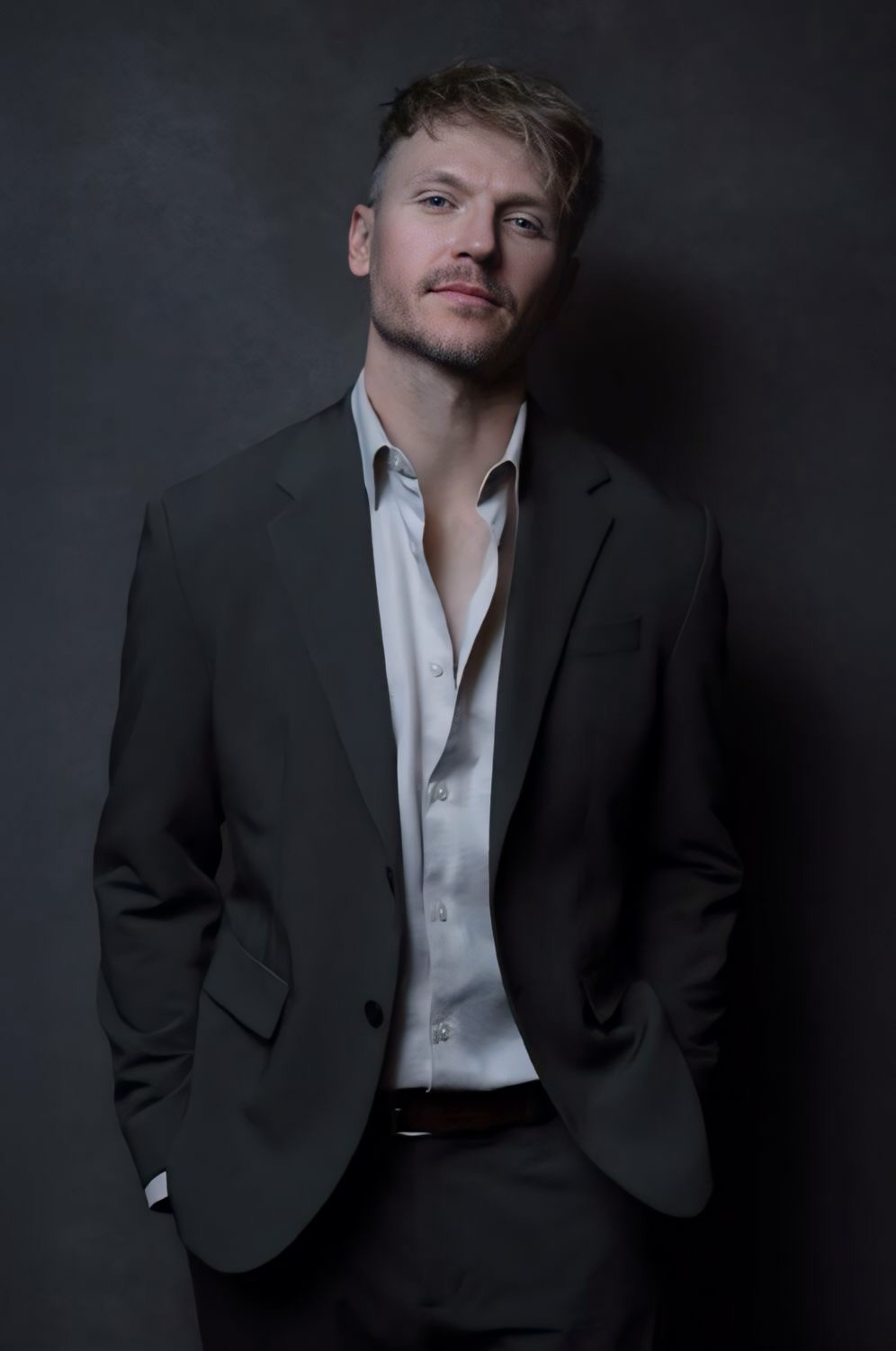
- Chad Rook in 2024
- Born: 1982 or 1983 (age 43–44); Lethbridge, Alberta, Canada
- Occupations: actor; director; writer; producer
- Years active: 2002–present

Chad Rook (born 1982 or 1983) is a Canadian actor, director, writer, and producer, known for his roles in the films War for the Planet of the Apes and Resident Evil: Welcome to Raccoon City.

== Biography ==
Rook was born in Lethbridge, Alberta, and raised in Southern Alberta. He moved to Vancouver to pursue his acting career one year after graduating from high school in Picture Butte, Alberta. His first role as an amateur actor was in a Northern Canada horror film called Pestilence, which did not achieve much success.

Rook describes himself as "not a popular kid" at school, which prompted him to join the drama club and begin to explore acting. His career role models are fellow Canadian actor and comedian Jim Carrey and American actor Mickey Rourke, while he considers his own mother as his life role model. In recent interviews, such as in May 2025, Rook has said that his time studying in Vancouver changed his views on the film industry and acting, crediting Ty Olsson as a mentor to his new views.

In January 2013, Rook was arrested at the Peace Arch Border Crossing and accused of attempting to enter the United States to work without a permit. Rook was interrogated for nine hours before being sent back to Canada. He was later given a 5-year entry ban to the United States, which he later appealed. At the same time, a female fan from Surrey, British Columbia opened a Facebook page to gather signatures for the ban to be lifted. Another fan urged Supernatural producer Jim Michaels to "spread the news" and show support for Rook, which Michaels did by retweeting the post. One year later, in January 2014, the ban was successfully lifted and reversed by the Customs and Border Protection in Seattle.

As of May 2025, Rook lives in Calgary. Prior to settling in Calgary, Rook taught theater in Los Angeles, Toronto, Vancouver, and Edmonton.

== Works ==
=== Selected filmography ===
| Year | Title | Role |
|---|---|---|
| 2017 | War for the Planet of the Apes | Boyle |
| 2018 | A Midsummer's Nigthmare | Blane Thomas |
| 2018 | Extremity | Bob/Red Skull |
| 2021 | Dangerous | Blanchard |
| 2021 | Resident Evil: Welcome to Raccoon City | Richard Aiken |
| 2026 | Prank Night | Rand |

=== Selected TV works ===
| Year | Title | Role | Notes |
|---|---|---|---|
| 2002 | John Doe | Spiked Hair | 2 episodes |
| 2011–2018 | Supernatural | Zachariah/Desmond/Marshall Todd | 3 episodes |
| 2013 | Cult | Dustin | 5 episodes |
| 2014–2018 | The Flash | Clyde Mardon | 3 episodes |
| 2016–2017 | Timeless | Karl | 7 episodes |
| 2017 | The 100 | Hatch | 3 episodes |
| 2018–2020 | Siren | Chris Mueller | 12 episodes |
| 2019 | The Terror | Dale Skaggs | 1 episode |
| 2019–2020 | Virgin River | Spencer | 5 episodes |
| 2021 | Joe Pickett | Deputy McLanahan | 19 episodes |
| 2022–2023 | Billy the Kid | James Dolan | 3 episodes |
| 2024 | Heritage Minutes | Jackie Parker | 1 episode |
| 2025 | My Life with the Walter Boys | Mac | |
| 2025 | It: Welcome to Derry | Sgt. Masters | Co-starring role |
