= Extremity (film) =

- Directed by: Anthony DiBlasi
- Written by: David Bond; Rebecca Swan
- Produced by: David Bond
- Starring: Chad Rook; Dana Christina; J. Larose
- Cinematography: Scott Winig
- Edited by: Anthony DiBlasi
- Music by: Adam Barber
- Production company: Dark Elergy Films
- Distributed by: Dread Central presents Epic Pictures
- Release date: 17 September 2018
- Running time: 103 minutes
- Country: United States
- Language: English

Extremity is a 2018 American horror film directed by Anthony DiBlasi, starring Chad Rook, Dana Christina and J. Larose.

== Cast ==
- Chad Rook as Bob/Red Skull
- Chantal Perron as Dr. Silvia Nichols
- Dana Christina as Allison Belle
- Dylan Sloane as Zachary
- Ashley Smith as Nell Leycock/White Skull
- Yoshihiro Nishimura as Cameraman
- Ami Tomite as Konishi
- J. Larose as Phil

== Release ==
The film was received a limited theatrical release and was released on VOD and Blu-ray on 2 October 2018.

== Reception ==
Rich Cross of Starburst rated the film 8 stars out of 10, writing that "in contrast to so much derivative “maniac-with-a-machete” indie-horror output, Extremity displays a determination to do things differently and an assuredness and confidence that sets it apart." Shawn Macomber of Rue Morgue wrote a positive review of the film, writing that "The world that director Anthony DiBlasi summons is rich, realistic and frightening. Christina delivers an affecting and nuanced performance, working with heavy material that could’ve gone poorly in lesser hands. The haunters are all legit embodiments of menace and intimidation."

Sean Leonard of HorrorNews.net wrote a positive review of the film, writing that the film "is able to approach the audience on multiple levels, engaging them in a film that can still be enjoyable on multiple viewings." Tiffany Blem of PopHorror wrote a positive review of the film, writing, "While at times the film becomes muddy and boring – after some of the masks are removed, thus humanizing the predators – it is still effective in that it made me wonder if I could ever subject myself to something of this magnitude."

Ian Sedensky of Culture Crypt gave the film a score of 30 out of 100, writing that it "amounts to directionless “smut dressed up as entertainment”."
