= The Antares Paradox =

- Film poster
- Spanish: La paradoja de Antares
- Directed by: Luis Tinoco
- Written by: Luis Tinoco
- Produced by: Luis Tinoco
- Starring: Andrea Trepat; Aleida Torrent; Jaume de Sans; David Ramírez
- Cinematography: Luis Tinoco
- Edited by: Frank Gutiérrez; Luis Tinoco
- Music by: Arnau Bataller
- Production company: Onirikal Studio
- Release dates: September 2022 (FantasticFest); 30 June 2023 (Spain)
- Country: Spain
- Language: Spanish

The Antares Paradox (Spanish: La paradoja de Antares) is a 2022 Spanish science-fiction drama film directed, written, and lensed by Luis Tinoco in his feature film directorial debut. It stars Andrea Trepat.

== Plot ==
The fiction takes place in a single room, involving dedicated astrophysicist Alexandra Baeza, who interacts via phone and video with the rest of characters. Alexandra is working in a Spanish branch of the SETI project. Upon receiving a signal from the Antares system that could herald the confirmation of extraterrestrial intelligence (and which she is required to verify), she receives the news of her father being at death's door. She faces a dilemma as to whether priority should be given to career or to family.

== Cast ==
- Andrea Trepat as Alexandra Baeza
- Aleida Torrent as Ana
- Jaume de Sans
- David Ramírez as Fernando
- Ferran Vilajosana as Dani

== Production ==
Produced by VFX outfit Onirikal Studio, The Antares Paradox is the debut feature film of Luis Tinoco, a visual effects artist. Tinoco also wrote the screenplay; Bataller composed the score and Frank Gutierrez worked in film editing. Filming lasted for three weeks, and took place in a set prepared inside the production company's premises.

== Release ==
The film made its world premiere at the Austin-based Fantastic Fest in September 2022. It also made it to the 55th Sitges Film Festival's 'New Visions' lineup (for its European premiere). It was released theatrically in Spain in June 2023.

== Reception ==
Germain Lussier of Gizmodo found the film, described as "Contact meets 24 in a single room", to be his favorite picture of Fantastic Fest 2022, being "that well made, that effective, and that universal", "destined to be remade on a bigger scale".

Mae Abdulbaki of Screen Rant rated the film 4 out of 5 stars ("excellent") assessing that it "is intense, well-made, explores interesting themes, and is bolstered by a fabulous central performance from Andrea Trepat".

Miguel Ángel Romero of Cinemanía rated the film 3½ out of 5 stars, considering that, along with the reduced number of elements and Trepat's talent, the helmer manages to "take us into a claustrophobic sci-fi exercise".

== Accolades ==
Year	Award	Category	Nominee(s)	Result	Ref.
2024	38th Goya Awards	Best Original Score	Arnau Bataller	Nominated	

== See also ==
- List of Spanish films of 2023
- List of one-location films
