= Kevin Alejandro =

American actor

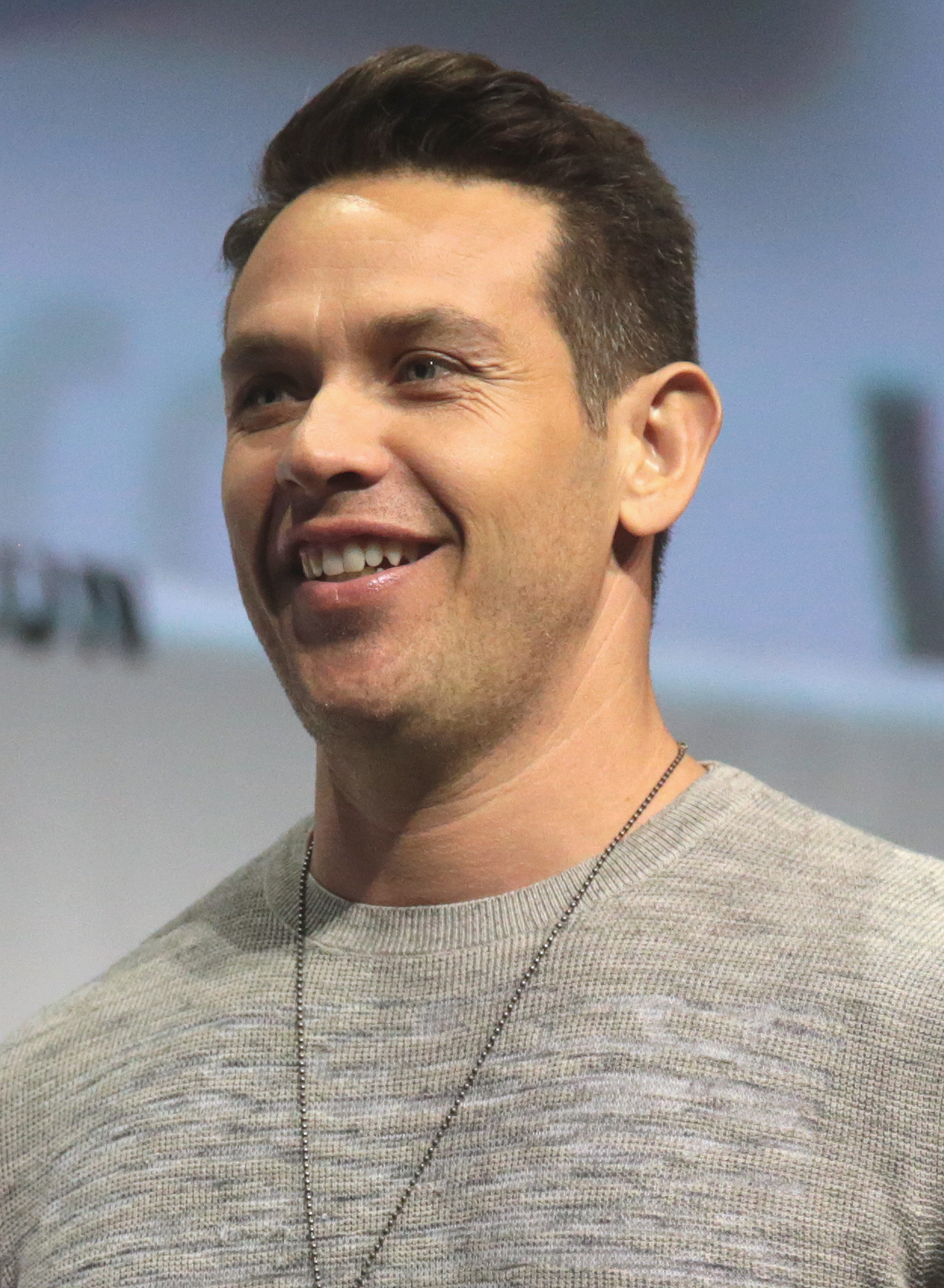
- Alejandro at WonderCon 2017
- Born: Kevin Michael Alejandro; April 7, 1976 (age 50); San Antonio, Texas, U.S.
- Occupations: Actor, film director
- Years active: 2002–present
- Spouse: Leslie de Jesus (m. 2004)
- Children: 1

Kevin Michael Alejandro (born April 7, 1976) is an American actor and director. He is best known to viewers for his roles as Nate Moretta in the TNT crime drama Southland, Forklift Mike in the NBC series Parenthood, Jesús Velázquez in the HBO supernatural thriller True Blood, Sebastian Blood / Brother Blood in The CW superhero series Arrow and as detective Daniel Espinóza in the Fox/Netflix supernatural comedy-crime drama Lucifer. He has also directed episodes of television, and two short films.

== Early life ==
Alejandro was born on 7 April 1976 in San Antonio, Texas, to Mexican parents. His first language was Spanish and his mother was from Guadalajara.

He grew up in Snyder, Texas, where he played football and studied drama. He credits his high school drama teacher with helping him to get a 4-year scholarship to the University of Texas at Austin. To give back, Alejandro established a scholarship in his teacher's name to send kids to theatre camp.

== Career ==
He currently portrays Station 42’s Fire Battalion Chief Manny Perez in Fire Country and Sheriff Country. He was featured on the ABC series Ugly Betty, playing Santos, the father of Justin Suarez and love interest of Hilda. At the time of the season 1 finale episode's filming, he had just become a series regular on the Fox network's newly introduced Drive, since cancelled. He was a featured player in the second season of the Showtime original series Sleeper Cell, playing Benito Velasquez, and also played Dominic Hughes in The Young and the Restless.

In 2006, he appeared in the NCIS episode "Driven" as character Jamie Jones. He made an appearance, along with fellow Ugly Betty actor Eric Mabius, in the CSI: Miami episode "One of Our Own", and another as a gay hustler in HBO's Big Love. He appeared on an episode of Charmed season 7 as Malvock, a cunning demon. He also appeared in the first few episodes of 24's fourth season, as a terrorist henchman, in which he also stars with Tony Plana, fellow Ugly Betty actor. Alejandro was a regular on the now defunct drama Shark as Deputy District Attorney Danny Reyes. and had a small role on The Cleaner, an A&E television series.

Alejandro appeared in the movie Crossing Over, which was released in February 2009, alongside Harrison Ford. He played Detective Nate Moretta in Southland, produced by Emmy Award winner John Wells. Southland was canceled by NBC Broadcasting just two weeks prior to the première of the show's sophomore run, but was then picked up by the cable network TNT. Alejandro appeared in the TV series The Mentalist Season 2, Episode 17 as Victor Bandino.

He had a role in Weeds, seasons 4 and 5. Drop Dead Diva's Season 1 Episode 5 also features Alejandro as the wrongfully convicted Michael Fernandez. He appeared on Season 1 of Sons of Anarchy as one of the Mayan MC members, son of Marcus, the MC's president. Alejandro stars in the third and fourth seasons of the vampire series True Blood as Jesús Velázquez.

In 2011, he appeared in the movie Red State, opposite John Goodman and directed by Kevin Smith, as well a horror film Cassadaga. He also played Tony Arroyo, a homicide detective in the 2013 television show Golden Boy. Alejandro portrayed Sheriff Tommy Solano in the ABC / A&E series The Returned.

In 2013, Alejandro joined the CW series Arrow as Sebastian Blood/Brother Blood, recurring throughout the show's second season. In January 2016, he began his role on the Fox TV series Lucifer as LAPD Homicide Detective Dan Espinoza. Lucifer ran for three seasons before being canceled by Fox and subsequently picked up by Netflix for a fourth, fifth and sixth season.

Alejandro directed several episodes in the later seasons of the show. The episode "Once Upon a Time" (an alternate reality film noir black and white stylised episode) which was intended to be aired in the series' fourth season but instead aired as a bonus episode on May 28, 2018, after the third season had concluded. He also directed the season 5 episode "Spoiler Alert", and in an interview with Tell-Tale TV, he confirmed he directed the season 6 premiere.

== Filmography ==
=== Film ===
Year	Title	Role	Notes
2002	Purgatory Flats	Owen Mecklin	
2003	Graduation Night	Fishman	
2008	Creature of Darkness	Emillio	
2009	Wake	Detective Daniels	
2009	Crossing Over	Gutierrez	
2011	The Legend of Hell's Gate: An American Conspiracy	August Edwards	
2011	Red State	Harry	
2011	Cassadaga	Mike	
2013	Medeas	Noah	
2015	Safelight		
2016	Take Me Home	—	Director; short film
2018	Bedtime Story	—	Director; short film
2020	The Lost Husband	Danny	
2022	Aristotle and Dante Discover the Secrets of the Universe	Sam Quintana	

=== Television ===
Year	Title	Role	Notes
2003	Crossing Jordan	Connor Marshall	Episode: "Fire and Ice"
2003	Las Vegas	Ray Duran	Episode: "Pros and Cons"
2004	Dr. Vegas	Raul Ortiz	Episode: "Advantage Play"
2004	Charmed	Malvoc	Episode: "There's Something About Leo"
2004–2005	The Young and the Restless	Dominic Hughes	15 episodes
2005	24	Kevin McCollin	3 episodes
2005	JAG	Corporal Jude Dominick	Episode: "Fit for Duty"
2005	Alias	Cesar Martinez	Episode: "The Orphan"
2005	CSI: New York	Tom Martin	Episode: "Crime and Misdemeanor"
2005	Threshold	Marcus	Episode: "Pulse"
2005	Medium	Jason Morrow	Episode: "Still Life"
2006	E-Ring	Miguel Carrera	Episode: "The General"
2006	Without a Trace	Casey Miller	Episode: "The Road Home"
2006	Big Love	The Hustler	Episode: "Eviction"
2006	CSI: Miami	Carlos Santigo	Episode: "One of Our Own"
2006	NCIS: Naval Criminal Investigative Service	Jaime Jones	Episode: "Driven"
2006	Faceless	Lucas Renosa	Television film
2006–2007	Sleeper Cell	Benito "Benny" Velasquez	7 episodes
2006–2007	Ugly Betty	Santos	8 episodes
2007	Drive	Winston Salazar	6 episodes
2007–2008	Shark	Danny Reyes	16 episodes
2008	Sons of Anarchy	Esai Alvarez	Episode: "The Pull" & "Hell Followed"
2008	Burn Notice	Raul	Episode: "Turn and Burn"
2008–2009	Weeds	Rudolpho Mason	4 episodes
2009	Knight Rider	Victor Galt	Episode: "I Love the Knight Life"
2009	Heroes	Agent Jenkins	"Chapter Eight 'Into Asylum'"
2009	Drop Dead Diva	Michael Fernandez	Episode: "Lost and Found"
2009	Melrose Place	Anton V.	Episode: "Shoreline"
2009–2011	Southland	Nate Moretta	14 episodes
2010	The Deep End	Connor Smith	Episode: "White Lies, Black Ties"
2010	The Mentalist	Victor Bandino	Episode: "The Red Box"
2010	Psych	Dane Northcutt	Episode: "Ferry Tale"
2010	Parenthood	Mike	3 episodes
2010	Law & Order: Special Victims Unit	Victor Ramos	Episode: "Branded"
2010–2012	True Blood	Jesus Velazquez	22 episodes
2011	Bones	Hercules "El Tornado" Maldonado	Episode: "The Change in the Game"
2011	Hide	Det. Bobby Dodge	Television film
2012	Breakout Kings	Benny Cruz	Episode: "Cruz Control"
2012	GCB	Danny	Episode: “Adam & Eve's Rib”
2013	Golden Boy	Christian Arroyo	13 episodes
2013–2014	Arrow	Sebastian Blood / Brother Blood	12 episodes
2015	The Returned	Sheriff Tommy Solano	10 episodes
2015	Grey's Anatomy	Officer Dan Pruitt	3 episodes
2016–2021	Lucifer	Detective Daniel Espinoza	92 episodes; also director: "Once Upon a Time", "Spoiler Alert" and "Nothing Ever Changes Around Here"
2016	The Catch	Nathan Ashmore	Episode: "The Package"
2021–2024	Arcane	Jayce (voice)	Main Cast
2022–present	Fire Country	Captain Manny Perez	Main Cast
2025	Sheriff Country	Captain Manny Perez	Guest role: 2 episodes; Director: 2 episodes

=== Web ===
Year	Series	Role
2008	Gemini Division	Amasso
