= J. Larose =

American actor

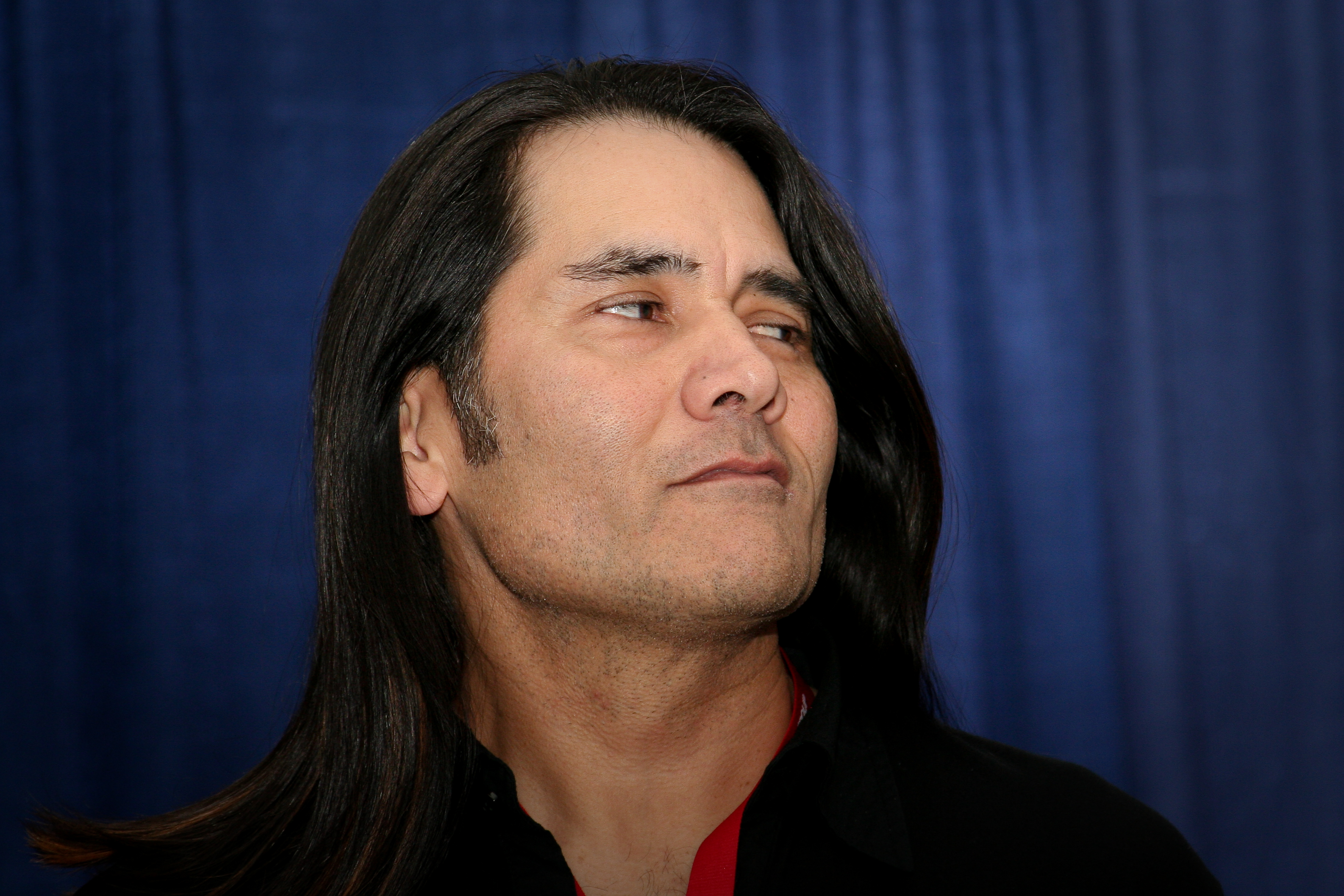
- LaRose at the 2009 New York Comic Con
- Born: August 24, 1972 (age 54); Chicago, Illinois, U.S.
- Occupation: Actor
- Years active: 1998–present

J. Adam LaRose is a Chicago-born actor of Navajo descent whose career spans from 1998 to the present. Throughout his career, LaRose has frequently collaborated with director Darren Lynn Bousman, appearing in six of Bousman's projects, including Saw III, Repo! The Genetic Opera, Devil's Carnival, Identity Lost, Butterfly Dreams, and the Fear Itself episode New Year's Day.

LaRose played key roles in two of Bousman's early works: Identity Lost and Butterfly Dreams, both of which featured him in lead roles. His Hollywood debut, however, came in a smaller but notable role as Troy, a victim of Jigsaw in Saw III. LaRose's participation was later highlighted in a special commentary track with Bousman included in the Director's Cut DVD of the film.

His role in Repo! The Genetic Opera is also significant; initially, LaRose appeared in a short film directed by Bousman to promote the feature. After the success of the short, Bousman went on to direct the full-length film, where LaRose portrayed a "Vanity and Vein" reporter interviewing Rotti Largo about Zydrate addiction.

In Devil's Carnival (2012), LaRose took on the role of The Major, a character in this musical horror film co-directed by Bousman and Terrance Zdunich. LaRose's career is marked by his strong, versatile performances, particularly in the horror and thriller genres, and his ongoing partnership with Bousman has made him a recognizable figure in the world of cult cinema.

Starting in 2019, he appeared in 18 episodes of the HBO comedy series The Righteous Gemstones as "Gregory," a member of the character Jesse Gemstone's entourage.

== Filmography ==
- Butterfly Dreams (2000) as James Luther
- Saw III (2006) as Troy
- Repo! The Genetic Opera (2006 short film) as Pavi Largo
- Saw IV (2007) as Troy (flashback)
- Repo! The Genetic Opera (2008) as Vanity and Vein reporter
- The Tenant (2009) as Jeff
- For the Love of Jade (2009) as Clemens
- Mother's Day as Hospital Security Guard
- 11-11-11 (2011) as Wayne
- Insidious (2011) as Long Haired Fiend
- Pennhurst (2011) as Willard
- The Devil's Carnival (2012) as The Major
- Insidious: Chapter 2 (2013) as Long Haired Fiend
- Missionary (2013) as Sarge Powell
- Now You See Me (2013) as FBI Agent
- Last Shift (2014) as Homeless Man
- To Write Love on Her Arms (2015) as Echo
- Extremity (2018) as Phil
- Big Top Evil (2019) as Roadside Jack
- America: The Motion Picture (2021) as Native American Right Activist (voice)

=== TV ===
- Mind of Mencia as Indian
- In Search Of...Mitch Pileggi as Ancient Man
- Sheena - "The Feral King" as Raoul
- Fear Itself - "New Year's Day" as Parking Garage Thug
- Fear the Walking Dead - "This Land is Your Land" as Old Nation Man
- Mayans M.C. - "Buho/Muwan" as Adam
- The Righteous Gemstones - as Gregory (Recurring 16 episodes, 2019–2025)
- ‘’Banshee Season 2” as Thompson (2 episodes)
