= Verónica Falcón =

Mexican actress and choreographer (b. 1966)

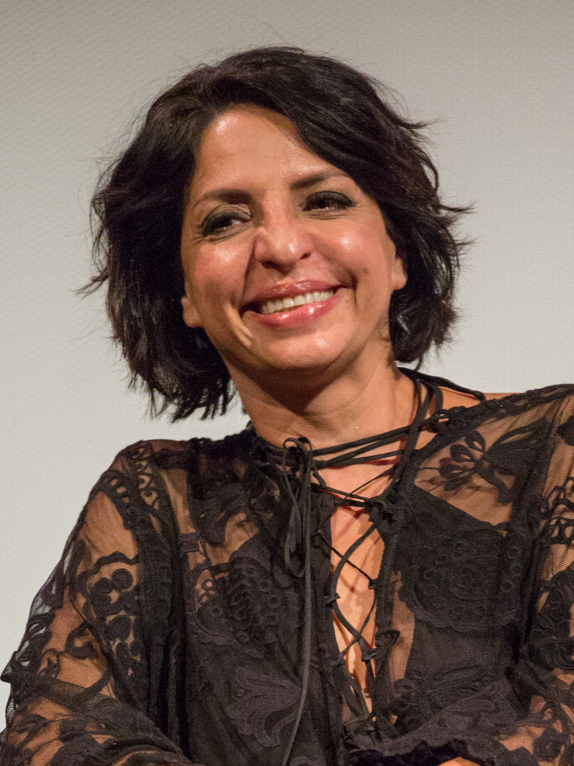
- Falcón in 2016
- Born: August 8, 1965 (age 61); Mexico City, Mexico
- Occupations: Actress, choreographer, writer
- Spouse: Marius Biegai (m. 1998–2022)
- Children: 1

Verónica Falcón (born August 8, 1965) is a Mexican actress and choreographer. When it comes to her English-speaking roles, she is best known for playing Camila Vargas in three seasons of Queen of the South and Lupe Gibbs in the 2020 HBO reboot of Perry Mason. In 2022, Falcón played Camila Elizonndro (sister of cartel boss Omar Navarro), for Season 4 of Ozark.

== Early life ==
Falcón was born August 8, 1965, in Mexico City, Mexico.

== Career ==
Falcón went into the entertainment industry, finding success over three decades working as an actress and choreographer in Mexico's National Opera Company, on Mexican television. In Mexican film, she captured mainstream attention for her performance as La Madrina Everardo Gout's 2011 film Days of Grace, in 2014, Falcón was nominated by PECIME — the Asociación de Periodistas Cinematográficos de México — for the Diosas de Plata award for best supporting film actress for her role as La Diabla in the 2013 film Besos de Azúcar.

In 2016, at the age of 50, she made the decision to risk forgoing an established career in Mexico to further her career in the U.S., strongly believing such opportunities should be taken. She is purported to be the first Mexico-born actress to secure a second lead role in a U.S. TV drama, thanks to her role as Camila Vargas in 39 episodes of Queen of the South. In 2019, Falcón was awarded the Outstanding Performance in a Television Series Impact Award for her portrayal of Camila Vargas in Queen of the South at the 22nd annual National Hispanic Media Coalition Impact Awards Gala.

In 2019, Falcón took the recurring role of Clara in eight episodes of the Steven Conrad neo-noir thriller television series Perpetual Grace, LTD alongside Sir Ben Kingsley and Luis Guzmán. In 2020, she starred as Marianne Sancar in the film Voyagers alongside Colin Farrell and Lily-Rose Depp. She also began starring in the HBO reboot of Perry Mason, where she's the love interest of private investigator Perry Mason, played by Matthew Rhys. Falcón also appeared in the 2021 Disney film Jungle Cruise with Dwayne Johnson and Emily Blunt.

In 2021, Falcón joined the cast of Ozark as Camila Elizonndro, sister of cartel boss Omar Navarro (played by Felix Solis) for 9 episodes of Season 4 alongside Jason Bateman and Laura Linney.

== Filmography ==
=== Film ===
Year	Title	Role	Notes	Ref.
1995	Midaq Alley	Kika		
2007	Hasta el viento tiene miedo ('The Wind of Fear')	Victoria		
2008	Los Fortuna	Adela	Short film	
2009	Not Forgotten	Reina		
2010	Invocación	Ma Ricarda Milagros	Short film	
2010	Dar y Recibir	Mesera	Short film	
2010	Te presento a Laura	Jefa Andrea		
2011	Between Us	Elsa Vendedora Bienes Raíces		
2011	Days of Grace	La Madrina		
2011	Saving Private Perez	Mujer árabe		
2012	Cinnamon	Aurora García		
2013	El edificio	Doña Brigida		
2013	Mirar atrás	Matilda	Short film	
2013	Besos de Azúcar ('Sugar Kisses')	The Devil		
2014	Tiempos Felices ('Happy Times')	Tía de Mónica		
2014	Eddie Reynolds y los ángeles de acero	Hotel receptionist		
2015	The Heirs	Fulgueira		
2015	A Monster with a Thousand Heads	Lorena Morgan		
2015	Una última y nos vamos	Casilda		
2016	Find a Boyfriend for My Wife... PLEASE!	Mujer Converible		
2021	Haymaker	Marisol		
2021	Voyagers	Marianne Sancar		
2021	The Forever Purge	Lydia		
2021	Jungle Cruise	Trader Sam		
2021	The Starling	Rosario Alvarez		
2022	Aristotle and Dante Discover the Secrets of the Universe	Liliana Mendoza		
2023	A Million Miles Away	Julia		
2024	Imaginary	Dr. Alana Soto		
2026	Lee Cronin's The Mummy	Carmen Santiago		
TBA	Bethesda	Clara		

=== Television ===
Year	Title	Role	Notes
1995	Salsaerobics	Self (host)	Host
1996	Banda Max	Self (talent coach)	
1996	Ritmoson ('Are Rhythm')	Self (host)	Host
2002	Operación Triunfo	Self (dance, movement and choreography teacher)	
2003	Clap!... El lugar de tus sueños	Self (dance teacher)	1 episode
2005	Desde Gayola	Dra. Rebeca Goldsmith / Several Characters / Sexologa	6 episodes
2007	Palabra de mujer	Samantha	Series 1, episode 39
2007	El Pantera	Mujer de Migración	1 episode: "Confianza rota"
2007	Trece miedos	Mamá Nico	1 episode: "Ojo por ojo"
2008	Vecinos	Maestra del Pato / HerOrdeeR	2 episodes
2008	Banged Up Abroad	Carmela	Costa Rica/Mexico – Scott and Lucy's Story
2008–2010	Que show con Alejandra Bogue	Sketch actor	
2008–2011	La rosa de Guadalupe	Director / Griselda / Alma / ...	5 episodes
2009	Hermanos y detectives	Estela	2 episodes
2009	The Disorderly Maids of the Neighborhood	Aurora	1 episode
2009	Central de abasto	Rosa Isela	1 episode: "Gran amor"
2010	Los Minondo	La Abadesa	5 episodes
2011	Sábado gigante	Jurado	Series 12, episode 1
2012	Capadocia	Cayetana	13 episodes
2012	Paramedicos	Debora	1 episode: "Héroes anónimos"
2012	La familia P. Luche	Labiuda	1 episode: "El funeral del merengues"
2012	Estado de Gracia	Bertha	1 episode
2013–2014	Sr. Ávila	Madre Ismael	6 episodes
2015	El Capitán Camacho	Maria Barbara / María Bárbara	26 episodes
2015	El Señor de los Cielos ('The Lord of Heaven')	Mirta "Mirtita" Saavedra	7 episodes
2016	American Latino TV	Self (guest)	Series 15, episode 1
2016	The Zoo	Self (guest)	Episode 28
2016	Noches con Platanito	Self. Interview	7 episodes
2016–2018	Queen of the South	Camila Vargas	Main role: 39 episodes
2017	Room 104	Rosa	Season 1, episode 9: "Boris"
2017	Celebrity Page	Self	Series 2, episode 257
2019	Perpetual Grace, LTD	Clara	8 episodes
2020–2023	Perry Mason	Lupe Gibbs	Recurring role: 7 episodes
2021	Why Women Kill	Catherine Castillo	Main role: 9 episodes
2021	The Falcon and the Winter Soldier	Donya Madani	2 episodes
2021	Ozark	Camila Elizonndro	Season 4: 6 episodes
2024	9-1-1	Councilwoman Olivia Ortiz	2 episodes
2026	Law & Order	Defense Attorney Victoria Potter	1 episode: "Accidentally Like a Martyr"

== Awards and nominations ==
Year	Award	Category	Nominated work	Result	Ref.
2014	Diosas de Plata	Best Supporting Film Actress	Besos de Azúcar	Nominated	
2017	Imagen Awards	Best Supporting Actress – Television	Queen of the South	Nominated	
2018	Imagen Awards	Best Supporting Actress – Television	Queen of the South	Nominated	
2019	NHMC Impact Awards	Outstanding Performance in a Television Series	Queen of the South	Won	
2023	Hispanic Organization of Latin Actors HOLA	Outstanding Performance by a Supporting Actor in the Theater	Arden of Faversham (Stage) Redbull Theatre Company NY	Won	
2024	Santa Fe Film Festival	Best Actress Award	American Underdog	Won	
2024	Santa Fe Film Festival	Trailblazer & Visionary Award	Professional Career	Won	
