= Last Shift =

2014 film by Anthony DiBlasi

- Promotional release poster
- Directed by: Anthony DiBlasi
- Written by: Anthony DiBlasi; Scott Poiley
- Produced by: Scott Poiley; Mary Poiley
- Starring: Juliana Harkavy; Joshua Mikel; J. LaRose; Mary Lankford; Natalie Victoria; Sarah Sculco
- Cinematography: Austin Schmidt
- Edited by: Anthony DiBlasi
- Music by: Adam Barber
- Production company: Skyra Entertainment
- Distributed by: Magnet Releasing
- Release date: October 25, 2014 (FrightFest)
- Running time: 87 minutes
- Country: United States
- Language: English

Last Shift is a 2014 American psychological horror film directed, edited, and co-written by Anthony DiBlasi. Juliana Harkavy stars as a rookie police officer who is tasked with taking the last shift at a police station before it is permanently closed, as strange events lead her to believe that it may be haunted. Joshua Mikel, J. LaRose, Mary Lankford, Natalie Victoria, and Sarah Sculco also star.

Last Shift premiered at the London FrightFest Film Festival on October 25, 2014, and was released to video-on-demand on October 6, 2015, to positive reviews from critics. A remake titled Malum, also directed by DiBlasi, was released in 2023.

== Plot ==
Jessica Loren, a rookie police officer on her first assignment, is ordered to take the last shift at a police station before it is permanently closed. Her mother pleads with her not to take the job, as her father, also a police officer, was killed on duty. After assuring her mother, Loren reports for duty and her commanding officer Cohen leads her on a brief tour, during which he explains that a HAZMAT team will be there to collect evidence that is difficult to dispose of and that she is not permitted to leave her post. Before he leaves, he gives Loren his phone number in case of emergency.

Loren becomes bored and almost falls asleep, though she wakes when she hears knocking. She does not see anyone at the door but finds a homeless man in the hallway; he urinates on the floor and refuses to leave. Loren forces him outside and he leaves. She also receives a series of distress calls from a woman named Monica, who says she has been taken hostage by a cult; the police dispatcher confirms that all emergency calls have been rerouted to the new station.

She continues to hear strange noises and finds a rear door open. She finds the homeless man in a storage room throwing things to the floor. She detains him, and takes him to a holding cell, where the door suddenly closes and locks behind her. The lights go out, a person with a bloodied face surprises her in the door's window, and she drops her flashlight. An unidentified person picks it up and taunts her. When the lights come back on, the door opens and no one is there.

Loren is further unsettled when not only she sees chairs and doors moving on their own but also ghostly figures, and hears voices singing. Loren encounters a loiterer, Marigold, who tells her that she was in a cell when the police brought in an infamous cult, led by the charismatic John Michael Paymon. Marigold says the story told to the public, that the cult was killed at their residence, is untrue; instead, they committed suicide at the station one year ago to the day. Marigold leaves after, humming the song Loren heard earlier.

Further paranormal events at the station reveal that the cult worships the king of Hell, a being also named Paimon. Before committing mass suicide, Paymon threatened to come back and destroy everything. Ryan Price, a fellow police officer, arrives at the station, and Loren accuses him of planning the events as a hazing ritual. Confused, he insists he has come by to check up on her, as he had served with her father. Price confirms that the murderous cult was captured alive and tells her that her father, who died apprehending them, would be proud of her. As he leaves, Loren sees a bullet wound in the back of his head and he disappears.

After seeing several visions of the cultists and their victims, Loren calls Cohen and says that she cannot finish her shift but relents when he threatens to fire her. The dispatcher tells Loren that Monica was the final victim of Paymon's cult and died over a year ago. A living member of the Paymon cult takes Loren hostage, only to die by suicide in front of her. Loren tries to leave but the glass does not break when shot. Her dead father calls her and demands justice for his death, and she returns to the holding cell to find the homeless man hanged. Her father calls again to warn her of cult members assaulting the station, and she kills them. As she shoots the last one, Cohen shoots her from behind. In a moment of clarity, she realizes that she has murdered the entire HAZMAT team. Cohen calls for medical assistance, and Loren is approached by the spirits of Paymon and his cultists as she dies from her wounds.

== Cast ==
- Juliana Harkavy as Jessica Loren
- Joshua Mikel as John Michael Paymon
- Hank Stone as Sgt. Cohen
- J. LaRose as Homeless Man
- Natalie Victoria as Marigold
- Sarah Sculco as Kitty Paymon
- Kathryn Kilger as Dorothea Paymon
- Mary Lankford as Birdy
- Matt Doman as Ryan Price

== Production ==
DiBlasi wanted to make a smaller, contained film that focused on atmosphere, especially sound design. The film was designed to be experienced from Harkavy's point of view, which keeps the audience wondering whether the events are all in her mind. Shooting took place in Sanford, Florida, in an abandoned police station. DiBlasi was influenced by the action film Assault on Precinct 13 (1976), the horror film A Nightmare on Elm Street (1984), and the Charles Manson documentary Manson (1973).

== Release ==
Last Shift premiered at the London FrightFest Film Festival on October 25, 2014. Magnet Releasing released it to video-on-demand on October 6, 2015.

== Reception ==
The film holds a 100% on Rotten Tomatoes based on 10 reviews and an average rating of 6.70/10. Anton Bitel of Sight & Sound called it the standout of FrightFest and wrote, "Last Shift masterfully builds its tension towards an unexpected yet satisfying release that deepens and ambiguates everything that has preceded". Staci Layne Wilson of Dread Central rated it 3.5/5 stars and wrote, "The movie is suspenseful and well-paced, and Harkavy is infinitely watchable". Mark L. Miller of Ain't It Cool News wrote, "This is a simple premise, sort of like an Assault on Precinct 13 by way of REC, but it is truly excellent in terms of building tension and delivering bone-rattling scares."

== Remake ==
A remake, titled Malum, also directed by DiBlasi, was released in 2023. Malum is co-written by DiBlase with Scott Poiley, and stars Jessica Sula, Candice Coke, Chaney Morrow, and Natalie Victoria.
