= Anthony DiBlasi =

American film director

- Born: Boston, Massachusetts, U.S.
- Education: Emerson College
- Occupations: Film director; producer; screenwriter
- Spouse: Natalie Victoria

Anthony DiBlasi is an American film director, producer, and screenwriter known for his work in horror films. He made his directorial debut in 2009 with the film Dread, based on the 1984 short story of the same name by English novelist and filmmaker Clive Barker. DiBlasi also directed and co-wrote the 2014 film Last Shift and the 2018 film Extremity.

== Life and career ==
DiBlasi was born and raised in Boston, Massachusetts, where he graduated from film school at Emerson College. While in the program, he held an internship with Marvel Studios in Los Angeles, California, around the time that the 2002 film Spider-Man was in post-production. After a meeting with novelist and filmmaker Clive Barker and producer Joe Daley, DiBlasi was hired by Barker and Daley as an intern, and he soon began working with them on film projects full-time. DiBlasi served as an executive producer on the horror films The Midnight Meat Train (2008) and Book of Blood (2009), each based on short stories by Barker. DiBlasi made his directorial debut in 2009 with the film Dread, based on the 1984 short story of the same name by Barker.

In 2014, DiBlasi directed the film Last Shift, which he co-wrote with Scott Poiley. A reboot of Last Shift, titled Malum, also directed by DiBlasi and written by DiBlasi and Poiley, was released in 2023.

== Filmography ==
Year	Title	Director	Producer	Notes	Ref(s)
2006	The Plague		Executive		
2008	The Midnight Meat Train		Executive		
2009	Book of Blood		Executive		
2009	Dread	Yes	Executive	Also writer	
2011	Cassadaga	Yes			
2013	The Test	Yes			
2013	The Profane Exhibit	Yes		Segment: Mother May I	
2013	Missionary	Yes			
2014	Last Shift	Yes		Also co-writer	
2015	Wuthering High School	Yes			
2015	Most Likely to Die	Yes			
2017	Exhume		Executive		
2018	Extremity	Yes			
2023	Malum	Yes		Also co-writer	
