= Luna Blaise =

American actress

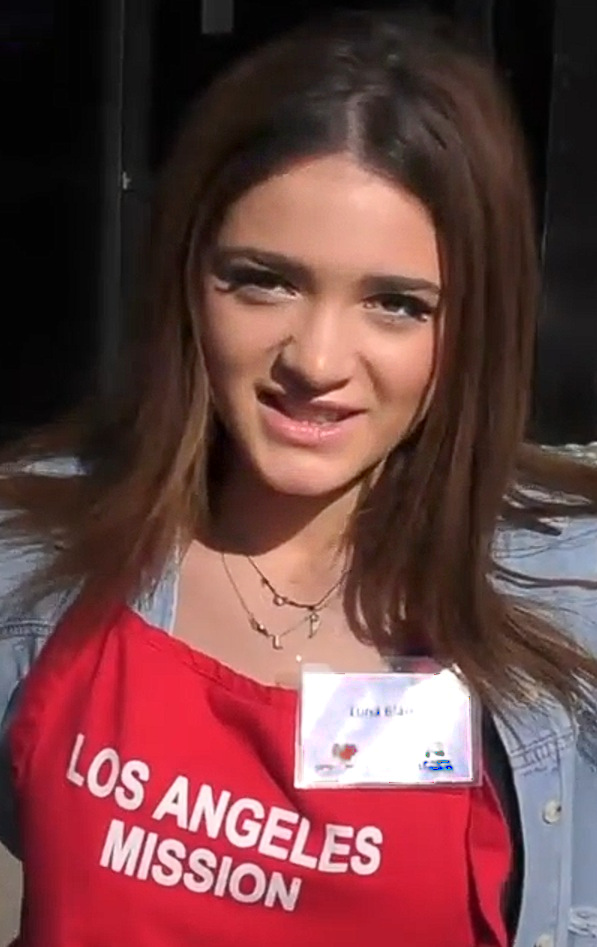
- Blaise in 2016
- Born: Luna Blaise Boyd; Los Angeles, California, U.S.
- Occupation: Actress
- Years active: 2007–present

Luna Blaise Boyd is an American actress. In 2015, she made her film debut in Memoria and subsequently gained recognition for her roles in the sitcom Fresh Off The Boat (2015–2018) and supernatural drama series Manifest (2018–2023). In 2025, she starred in the top-grossing science fiction film Jurassic World Rebirth, which brought her to greater attention.

== Early life ==
Blaise was born in Los Angeles, California, to father Paul Boyd, a Scottish director from Glasgow, and mother Angelyna Martinez-Boyd, a second-generation Mexican-American actress from San Antonio, Texas.

== Career ==
=== Early roles and recognition ===
Blaise began acting at the age of six with a cameo appearance in the 2008 film Vicious Circle. In 2013, she was cast as Young Nina in the indie art film, Memoria, executive produced by James Franco, who also starred in the film.

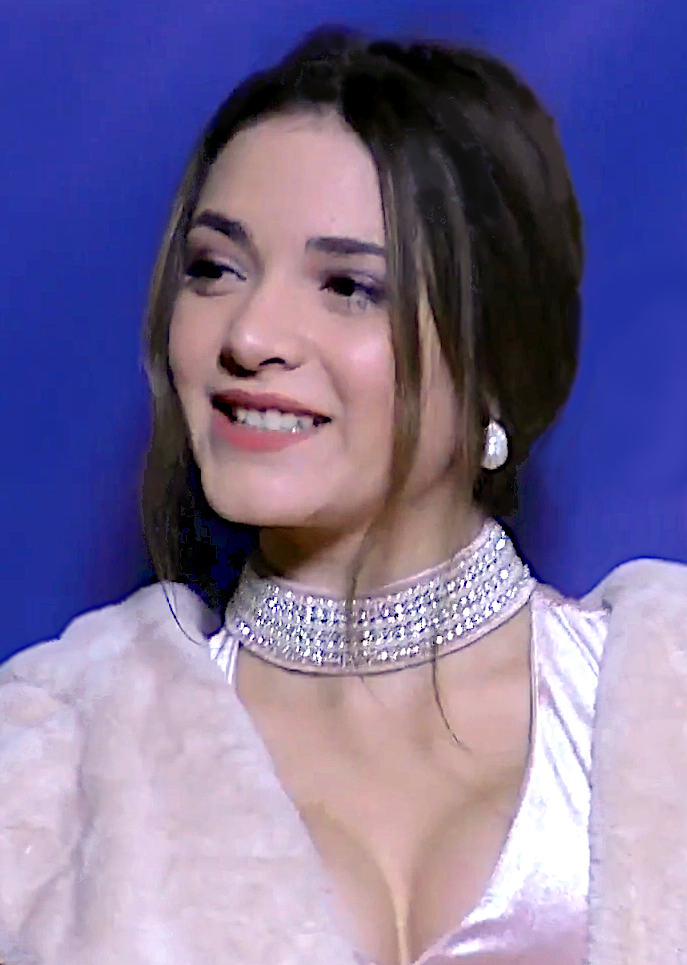
Blaise in 2016

In 2014, Blaise was cast in the recurring role of Nicole on the ABC television series Fresh Off the Boat starring Randall Park and Constance Wu as Louis and Jessica Huang. She was 13 when the series started filming, and it was her first major role. The role earned her an award for Best Recurring Young Actress at the 2016 Young Artist Awards. In June 2016, Blaise starred in the music video of Jacob Sartorius' debut single "Sweatshirt". In 2025, she had a role in the seventh film in the Jurassic Park franchise, Jurassic World Rebirth.

=== Musical debut and Manifest ===
In early 2017, Blaise released her first single, "Over You", and announced in December 2017 she would be releasing new music in the new year. In late 2018, Blaise released her second single, "Secrets." In 2018, Blaise was cast as Olive Stone in the NBC supernatural drama Manifest. The series was initially canceled after three seasons but, following a surge in popularity after being added to Netflix, was picked up by the streaming service for a fourth and final season, concluding in June 2023. The series received mixed reviews from critics.

In 2023, Blaise starred in a supporting role in the independent film Aristotle and Dante Discover the Secrets of the Universe. In 2025, Blaise appeared in Gareth Edwards' science fiction film Jurassic World Rebirth, co-starring Scarlett Johansson, Mahershala Ali, and Jonathan Bailey. The film was a massive commercial success, grossing over $869.1 million worldwide, despite mixed reviews from critics. It was her first box office success and also garnered Academy Award recognition.

== Filmography ==
=== Film ===
Year	Title	Role	Notes	Ref.
2008	Konflooent	Victoria Santos		
2009	Vicious Circle	Chloe (Danyi's Sister)		
2015	Memoria	Nina (age 13)		
2018	Surviving Theater 9	Eileen		
2018	Concrete Kids	Luna		
2021	Detach	Sophia	Short film	
2022	We Are Gathered Here Today	Susie		
2023	Aristotle and Dante Discover the Secrets of the Universe	Elena Tellez		
2023	Deltopia	Hannah		
2025	Jurassic World Rebirth	Teresa Delgado		

=== Television ===
Year	Title	Role	Notes	Ref.
2013	The Breakdown	Loonz	Television film	
2015–2018	Fresh Off the Boat	Nicole	24 episodes	
2018–2023	Manifest	Olive Stone	Main role	

=== Music videos ===
Song	Year	Artist	Notes	Ref.
"Me-Time (With the Pulmonary Palimpsest)"	2009	Busdriver	As a little girl	
"Sweatshirt"	2016	Jacob Sartorius		
"Over You"	2017	Luna Blaise		
"Secrets"	2018	Luna Blaise		

== Awards and nominations ==
Year	Award	Category	Project	Result	Ref
2016	Young Artist Awards	Recurring Young Actress (14-21)	Fresh Off the Boat	Won	
