= Malum (film) =

2023 American film by Anthony DiBlasi

- Theatrical release poster
- Directed by: Anthony DiBlasi
- Written by: Anthony DiBlasi; Scott Poiley
- Based on: Last Shift by: Anthony DiBlasi; Scott Poiley
- Produced by: Scott Poiley; Dan Clifton
- Starring: Jessica Sula; Eric Olson; Chaney Morrow; Candice Coke
- Cinematography: Sean McDaniel
- Edited by: Anthony DiBlasi
- Music by: Samuel Laflamme
- Production companies: Welcome Villain Films; Skyra Entertainment
- Distributed by: Welcome Villain Films
- Release date: March 31, 2023
- Running time: 93 minutes
- Country: United States
- Language: English
- Box office: $221,738

Malum (Latin: Evil) is a 2023 American horror film directed and co-written by Anthony DiBlasi. A remake of the 2014 film Last Shift, also directed by DiBlasi, the story sees a rookie cop who experiences paranormal occurrences at a decommissioned police station where she's working the final shift. The cast includes Jessica Sula, Eric Olson, Chaney Morrow and Candice Coke.

== Plot ==
Jessica Loren prepares for her last shift at a decommissioned police station of the Lanford Police Department, where her father, Will Loren once worked a year ago until, following their last call involving the abduction of four young women, he commits mass murder-suicide on his fellow officers and then himself. On her way to work, Jessica stops by the cemetery to visit Will's grave and has a tense but brief conversation with her mother Diane.

Jessica is harassed by some cultists before arriving at the station; where she encounters officer Cohen, who gets Jessica settled in after an aggressive first meeting. Jessica takes some time to explore the building further, finding some more information about the Malum Flock, a cultist group that perperated the abduction of the four young women. Soon after, Jessica finds a rouge pig chained up outside and brings it inside. A homeless man breaks into the police department in search for his missing daughter, who turns out to be the father of Betty Campbell; the only girl out of the four abductees who died and was not rescued by Will a year ago.

Jessica manages to find and isolate an irate man in a holding cell. Upon finding a USB stick, Jessica goes to find a laptop; finding Marigold instead. Jessica patches up Marigold, but she becomes terrified of something that Jessica cannot see and panics, before Jessica orders her out of the building. The cultists then begin harassing Jessica over the phone, taunting her that they captured the victims Will previously rescued.

Jessica begins viewing the footage on the USB stick, seeing the Flock brutally beat a girl to death. She then hears noises and goes to investigate, being attacked by a demonic cultist in the process. She returns to the safety of her office and continues the footage, which shows the police interrogation videos of the demented Malum Flock followers. Her hallucinations continue until Officers Price and Hudson arrive and talk with her more about Will's massacre at the department. In a trance, Jessica witnesses a gathering of the Flock, seeing them holding a baby; which turns out to be herself. She hears the cries of the homeless man and goes to help him. Upon doing so, the man escapes into the building, and Jessica is left to fend off a mangled demonic cultist; she ends up accidentally shooting and killing the pig from earlier.

Diane arrives at the police department and admits to Jessica that she knew John Malum, the leader of the Flock, for a long time. Jessica keeps Diane safe in the office and goes to investigate more noises, find a cultist holding a young woman at gunpoint. After an exchange of harsh words, the young woman and the cultist are shot and killed, leading to a large group of cultists to chase after Jessica. Diane goes missing and Jessica sets out to find her, having a deadly encounter with the homeless man. The rest of the cultists roam the police department, calling for Jessica to find and kill them as they murder Monica, Julie and Ana before her eyes.

Deciding to deal with the cultists once and for all, she retrieves a shotgun to clear out the rest of the police department. She follows cries and voices deep within the building, descending down some stairs where she finds the many demonic-looking cultists in disturbing situations. They point Jessica into a room where she encounters John Malum and his followers. As the cultists taunt Jessica, the Low God reveals itself; the being who the Malum Flock answers to. Jessica fires at the demonic beast and ends up back in the halls of the police department, shooting at who she believes to be cultists. After managing to mortality wound one, it is revealed that Jessica actually shot and killed Diane.

Jessica breaks down and the Malum Flock cheer and mock her for it. Jessica, in her grief; decides to commit suicide just like her father Will. As she dies, the cultists disappear as if they never existed; her lifeless corpse now sits on the makeshift throne besides the Low God before screaming demonically.

== Cast ==
- Jessica Sula as Jessica Loren
- Eric Olson as Will Lorren
- Candice Coke as Diane
- Chaney Morrow as John Malum
- Britt George as Officer Grip Cohen
- Clarke Wolfe as Dorothea
- Morgan Lennon as Kitty
- Danielle Coyne as Birdie
- Kevin Wayne as Nate
- Natalie Victoria as Marigold
- Sam Brooks as Officer Price
- Christopher Matthew Spencer as Officer Hudson
- Monroe Cline as Betty
- Valerie Loo as Anna Cole

== Production ==
Principal photography took place on location in an abandoned prison in downtown Louisville, Kentucky, from August to September 2022.

== Release ==
Malum received a theatrical release in the United States on March 31, 2023. The film was released on video-on-demand (VOD) and digital platforms on May 16, 2023.

== Critical reception ==
On the review aggregator website Rotten Tomatoes, 84% of 25 critics' reviews are positive, with an average rating of 7/10. The website's consensus reads: "Malum lures you to clock in for another Mason-esque Last Shift at a haunted police station with sheer blunt lore and gore."

Matt Zoller Seitz of RogerEbert.com gave Malum three out of four stars, and wrote that the film is most "impressive when it turns its talented ensemble cast loose on material that was obviously a lot of fun to play with." Matt Donago of Paste commended the film for its "gruesome indie [special] effects", and concluded that "DiBlasi delivers what Last Shift fans will once again enjoy. That's what's slightly disappointing: Malum differentiates [itself from Last Shift], but does it differentiate enough?" The Austin Chronicle's Richard Whittaker gave the film two out of five stars, criticizing its use of jump scares and writing: "At least Last Shift had a grubby ingenuity. Malum has enough budget to be too glossy to be gutter fun, and adds little visually much beyond some very mediocre practical effects, often feeling that – yet again – its ambitions outstripped its grasp."
