= Benjamin Alire Sáenz =

American poet and author (1954–2026)

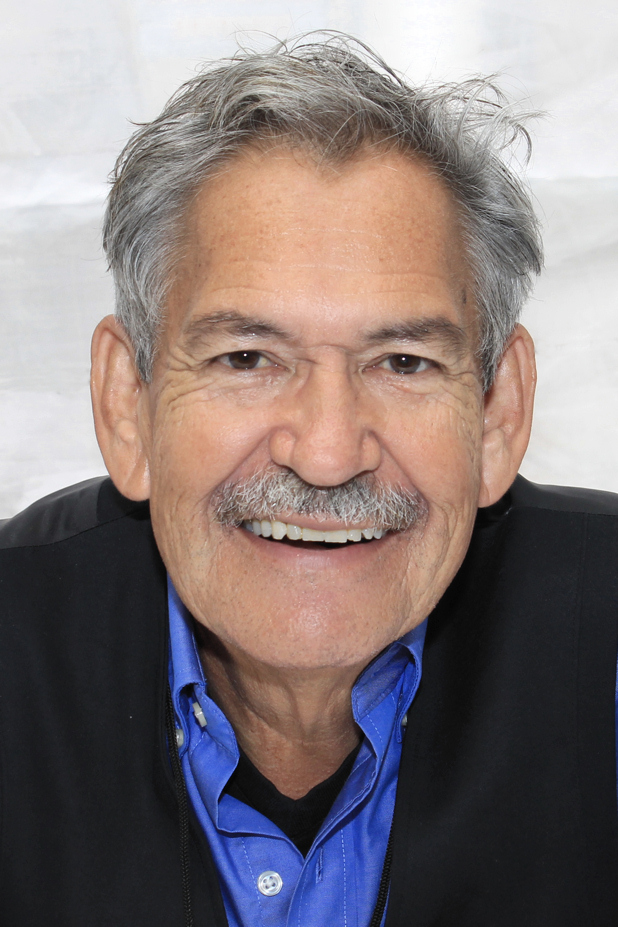
- Sáenz in 2016
- Born: August 16, 1954; Old Picacho, New Mexico, U.S.
- Died: July 28, 2026 (aged 71)
- Education: St. Thomas Seminary (BA); University of Texas at El Paso (MA)
- Writing career
- Language: English
- Period: 1990s–2026
- Genres: Novels, short stories, poetry, young adult literature
- Subjects: Hispanic and Latino American culture, LGBT
- Notable works: Carry Me Like Water, Aristotle and Dante Discover the Secrets of the Universe, The Inexplicable Logic of My Life, Everything Begins and Ends at the Kentucky Club
- Notable awards: American Book Award (1992); PEN/Faulkner Award (2013)

Benjamin Alire Sáenz (August 16, 1954 – July 28, 2026) was an American poet, novelist and writer of children's books.

== Life and career ==
Sáenz was born in Old Picacho, New Mexico, and raised on a cotton farm in Mesilla, New Mexico, near Las Cruces. He earned a BA in Humanities and Philosophy from St. Thomas Seminary in Denver, Colorado, and a MA in creative writing from the University of Texas at El Paso. He continued to live and work in El Paso, Texas. After 15 years of marriage to his wife, an El Paso family court judge, he came out as gay, and they filed for divorce in 2009.

Sáenz was 54 when he came out. In an interview, he confirmed that he had struggled with this topic for a long time and that he saw writing as a way to overcome it.

In 2013, Benjamin Alire Sáenz became the first Latino to win the prestigious PEN/Faulkner Award for Fiction with Everything Begins and Ends at the Kentucky Club.

On October 29, 2022, Sáenz received the Inaugural Hummingbird Award in Literary Arts from the Tulsa City-County Library. The event was hosted by the Tulsa City-County Library and the Hispanic Resource Center.

Sáenz died on July 28, 2026, at the age of 71.

== Awards ==
- Wallace E. Stegner Fellowship, poetry
- 1992 American Book Award, for Calendar of Dust
- Lannan Literary Award for Poetry 1993
- Carry Me Like Water, Southwest Book Award (Border Regional Library Association)
- Dark and Perfect Angels, Southwest Book Award (Border Regional Library Association)
- Grandma Fina and Her Wonderful Umbrellas, Book Publishers of Texas Award for Best Book for Children or Young People 2000, Texas Institute of Letters
- Sammy and Juliana in Hollywood, Américas Award for Children's and Young Adult Literature, the Paterson Book Prize, the J Hunt Award, Finalist Los Angeles Times Book Prize for Young Adult Fiction, Top Ten Best Books for Young Adults
- He Forgot to Say Goodbye. Tomás Rivera Mexican American Children's Book Award; Southwest Book Award (Border Regional Library Association); Chicago Public Library, Best of the Best Books for Teens; New York Public Library Stuff for the Teen 2009; Commended Title, Américas Award for Children's and Young Adult Literature 2009
- A Perfect Season for Dreaming, Friends of the Austin Public Library Award for Best Children's Book, 2008 (Texas Institute of Letters), Bank Street Best Children's Books of the Year 2008, Kirkus Review 2008 Notable Books for Children, Paterson Book Prize
- Aristotle and Dante Discover the Secrets of the Universe, Stonewall Book Award-Mike Morgan & Larry Romans Children's and Young Adult Literature Award, 2013; Honor Book, Michael L. Printz Award, 2013; Pura Belpré Award, 2013.

== Works ==
- "Students I See Every Day", Santa Fe Poetry Broadside, Issue #31, February, 2003
- Do Not Mind the Bombs, Narrative Magazine

=== Poetry ===
- Calendar of Dust. Broken Moon Press. 1991. ISBN 978-0-913089-16-3.
- Dark and Perfect Angels. Cinco Puntos Press. 1995. ISBN 978-0-938317-23-4.
- Elegies in Blue. Cinco Puntos Press. 2002. ISBN 978-0-938317-64-7.
- Dreaming the End of War. Copper Canyon Press. 2006. ISBN 978-1-55659-239-3.
- The Book of What Remains. Copper Canyon Press. 2010. ISBN 978-1-55659-297-3.

=== Short stories ===
- Flowers for the Broken. Broken Moon Press. 1992. ISBN 978-0-913089-28-6.
- Everything Begins and Ends at the Kentucky Club. Cinco Puntos Press. 2012. ISBN 9781935955320.

=== Novels ===
- Carry Me Like Water. Hyperion. 1995. ISBN 9780786861354.
- The House of Forgetting. HarperCollins. 1997. ISBN 9780060187385.
- In Perfect Light. Rayo / HarperCollins. 2005. ISBN 9780060779207.
- Names on a Map. Harper Perennial. 2008. ISBN 978-0-06-128569-1.

=== Young adult novels ===
- Sammy and Juliana in Hollywood. Cinco Puntos Press. 2004. ISBN 978-0-938317-81-4.
- He Forgot to Say Goodbye. Simon & Schuster Children's Publishing. 2008-06-17. ISBN 978-1-4169-4963-3.
- Last Night I Sang to the Monster. Cinco Puntos Press. 2009. ISBN 9781933693583.
- Aristotle and Dante Discover the Secrets of the Universe. Simon & Schuster Books for Young Readers. 2012. ISBN 9781442408920.
- The Inexplicable Logic of My Life. Clarion. 2017. ISBN 9780544586505.
- Aristotle and Dante Dive into the Waters of the World. Simon & Schuster Books for Young Readers. 2021. ISBN 9781534496194.
- When the World Was Happy. Simon & Schuster Books for Young Readers. 2026. ISBN 9798347104055.

=== Children's books ===
- A Gift from Papa Diego. Bt Bound. 1999. ISBN 978-0-613-06587-0.
- Grandma Fina and Her Wonderful Umbrellas. Illustrator Geronimo Garcia. Cinco Puntos Press. 2001. ISBN 978-0-938317-61-6.
- A Perfect Season for Dreaming / Un tiempo perfecto para soñar. Cinco Puntos Press. 2008. ISBN 9781933693019.
- The Dog Who Loved Tortillas / La perrita que le encantaban las tortillas. Cinco Puntos Press. 2009. ISBN 9781933693545.
- Grandma Fina's Wonderful Umbrella. Allida. 2026. ISBN 9780063294127.

=== Anthologies ===
- Dagoberto Gilb, ed. (2008). "The Unchronicled Death of Your Holy Father; Fences". Hecho en Tejas: An Anthology of Texas-Mexican Literature. UNM Press. ISBN 978-0-8263-4126-6.
- X. J. Kennedy; Dana Gioia, eds. (2005). An introduction to poetry. Pearson Longman. ISBN 978-0-321-20939-9.
- "To the Desert," "Resurrections," Twentieth Century American Poetry (2004), edited by Dana Gioia, McGraw Hill ISBN 0-07-240019-6
