= Aristotle and Dante Dive into the Waters of the World =

2021 young adult novel by Benjamin Alire Sáenz

- Author: Benjamin Alire Sáenz
- Illustrator: Sarah J. Coleman
- Cover artist: Sarah J. Coleman (lettering, illustration) Mark Brabant (photography) Art direction by Chloë Foglia
- Language: English
- Subject: Mexican American identity, heteronormativity, sexual orientation, masculinity, friendship
- Genre: Young adult, Bildungsroman
- Publisher: Simon & Schuster Books for Young Readers
- Publication date: October 12, 2021
- Publication place: United States
- ISBN: 9781534496194

Aristotle and Dante Dive into the Waters of the World is a New York Times best selling young adult novel by Benjamin Alire Sáenz, published October 12, 2021 by Simon & Schuster Books for Young Readers. It is the sequel to Aristotle and Dante Discover the Secrets of the Universe.

The audiobook read by Lin-Manuel Miranda was nominated for the Grammy Award for Best Audio Book, Narration & Storytelling Recording.

== Plot ==
Immediately following the events of Aristotle and Dante Discover the Secrets of the Universe, Aristotle and Dante begin navigating their newfound relationship. They go on a camping trip, where they have oral and anal sex for the first time. They meet a woman on their trip, who gives them a painting by her late son with a poem on the back that discusses his struggle with being a gay man.

Ari and his mom, Lilliana, find out from a church lady that a friend of hers had a son who died of AIDS and that many members of the church wanted the way he died to be mentioned at the funeral. Lilliana tells her to get out and takes Ari to the funeral. There, he runs into Cassandra Ortega, his sworn enemy from high school, the dead boy's sister. She insists that Ari can't know what her brother went through because she assumes he is straight. He comes out to her, and they make up and become friends.

Ari witnesses a boy named Rico being beat up by homophobic bullies and befriends another boy named Danny who defends him. Ari begins to open up to his past friends, Gina Navarro and Susie Byrd, and tells them Dante is his boyfriend. He also comes out to his sisters.

Ari and his father, Jaime, visit his brother, Bernardo, in prison. While there, he and Bernardo discuss the transgender woman Bernardo murdered. Bernardo repeatedly misgenders her and insults Ari. Bernardo makes homophobic remarks after Ari comes out to him, and Ari no longer feels reverence for the memory of his brother. After leaving the prison, Ari visits the grave of the woman Bernardo killed and gives her a feminine name because she wasn't respected in her life.

Ari's family goes to Dante's house for Thanksgiving, and Dante's mother, Soledad, is pregnant. After she has serious contractions, Jaime drives her and both families to the hospital, where she has a son, whom she names Sophocles.

Shortly after the birth of Sophocles, Jaime has a heart attack and passes away in Ari's arms. Ari enters a mourning period, including a moment when he breaks down in the desert in front of Gina, Susie, and Dante, as well as a scene where Dante washes him in the shower. Ari delivers the eulogy at the funeral. He bonds with his mom afterwards, and she gifts him his father's old journal from when he was in the military.

Ari, Susie, and a boy in their class named Chuy fight back against a racist teacher, and they are suspected of releasing a box of crickets into her room, then befriend the perpetrator and nickname him Cricket.

Ari and Dante discuss college plans. Ari plans to attend the University of Texas at El Paso, and Dante reveals he was accepted into an art program in Paris but is undecided on attending because he doesn’t want to leave Ari. They have an argument where Ari tells him to follow his dreams and attend, but Dante interprets that sentiment as wanting to push him away and break up. Dante ends up leaving for Paris to attend the university. On a whim, Ari buys a plane ticket to visit Dante in Paris. Dante's father, Sam, corresponds with him and tells Dante where and when to meet him. They reconcile at the Louvre in front of Dante's favorite painting, The Raft of the Medusa by Géricault.

== Reception ==
Aristotle and Dante Dive into the Waters of the World is a New York Times and IndieBound best seller.

The book received starred reviews from Booklist, Kirkus Reviews, Publishers Weekly, and School Library Journal.

Booklist called the book "a brilliant, character-driven novel that challenges its readers themselves to think about life while falling in love with those two unforgettable characters, Aristotle and Dante." Kirkus Reviews called it "[m]essily human and sincerely insightful." School Library Journal wrote, "This literary romance will woo hearts and minds alike."

Shelf Awareness also provided a positive reviewing, calling the novel "a joyous and heartrending exploration of grief, love and queer belonging."

The audiobook also received a starred review from Booklist.

Kirkus Reviews named Aristotle and Dante Dive into the Waters of the World one of the best books of 2021.

Year	Accolade	Result	Ref.
2021	Booklist Editors' Choice: Youth Audio	Selection	
2021	Goodreads Choice Award for Young Adult Fiction	Finalist	
2022	Audie Award for Best Male Narrator	Winner	
2023	Grammy Award for Best Audio Book, Narration & Storytelling Recording	Nominee	
