= Dani Donadi =

Italian film composer and record producer

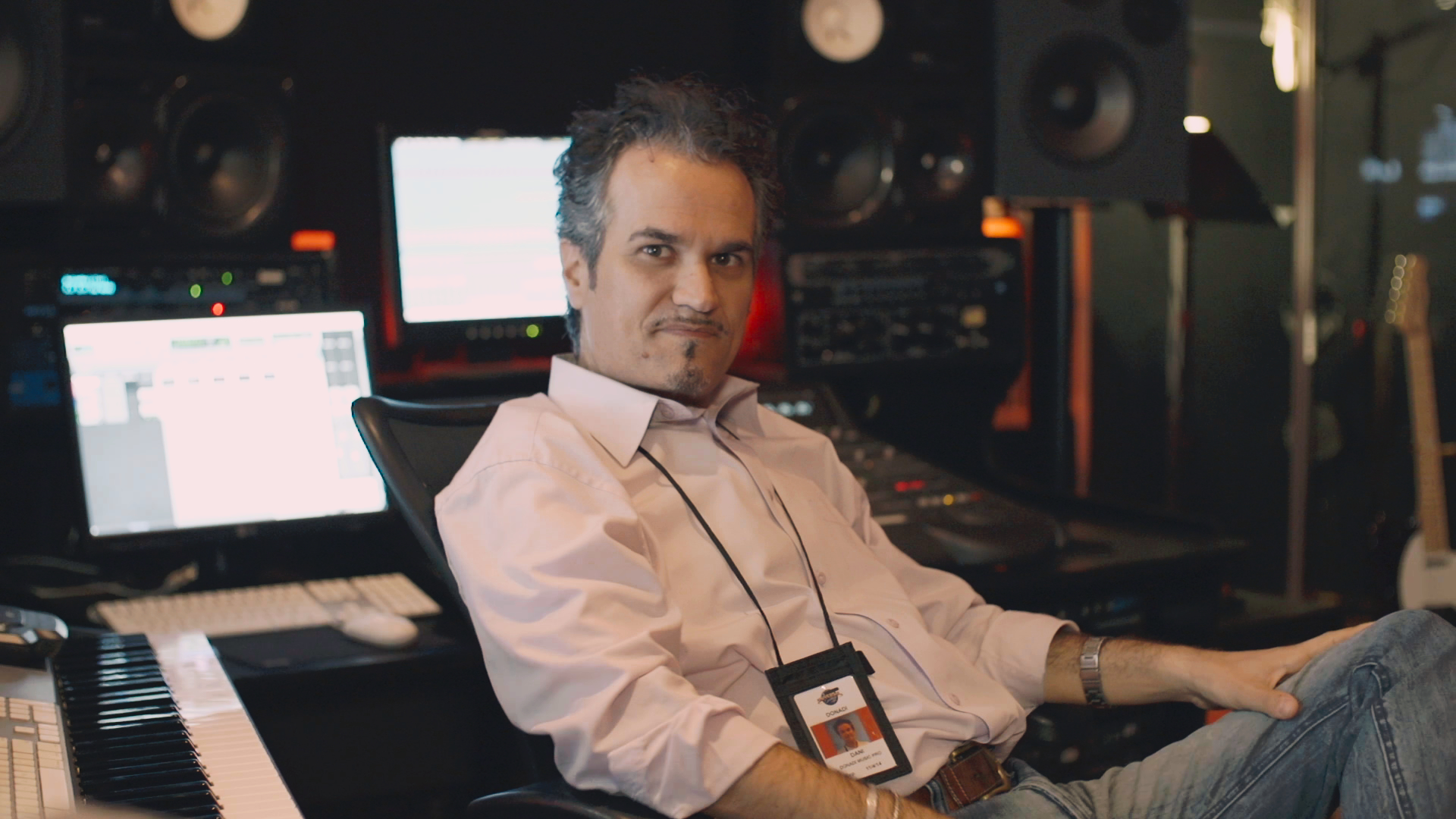
At Donadi Media, music production studio - Universal Studios Orlando, June 2017

Dani Donadi (born November 25, 1967) is an Italian film composer and record producer born in Treviso (near Venice), Italy. After studying composition, orchestration and sound engineering in Italy and France, he moved to the United States in 1988 and now lives in Orlando, Florida. He has composed original scores for feature films, TV shows, stage shows, musicals and Universal Studios attractions. Dani also served as the composer and audio director of the Super Nintendo World theme park at Universal Studios Japan, Universal Studios Hollywood and the new Universal Epic Universe in Orlando Florida. He received a Thea Award for Outstanding Achievement in Music for it.

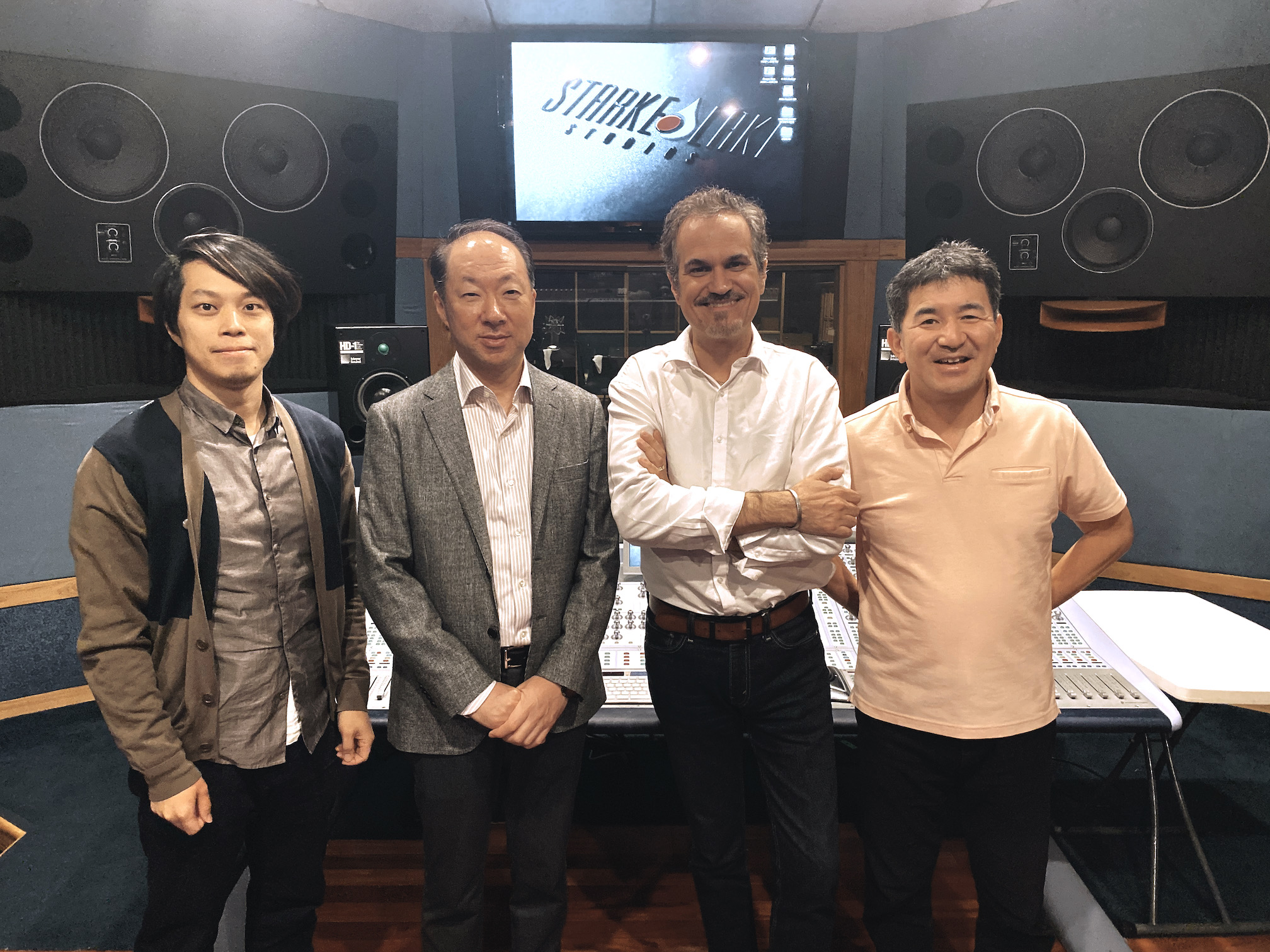
Super Nintendo World recording session: Yuki Tsuji, Koji Kondo, Dani Donadi and Mahito Yokota - October 2019

He's the founder of Donadi Media, an audio design company specialized in music, sound design and onsite integration for themed attractions, video games and all media works. Donadi Media created the music of the new Six Flags Qiddiya theme park in Saudi Arabia.

== Discography ==
- 2019 - Cypress Inheritance (Video Game Soundtrack)
- 2021 - The Great Journey (Album)
- 2025 - Momenti (Album)
