= Book of Blood =

- Teaser poster
- Directed by: John Harrison
- Screenplay by: John Harrison; Darin Silverman
- Based on: Books of Blood by Clive Barker
- Produced by: Clive Barker; Lauri Apelian; Joe Daley; Anthony DiBlasi; Micky MacPherson; Jorge Saralegui; Nigel Thomas
- Starring: Jonas Armstrong; Sophie Ward; Doug Bradley
- Cinematography: Philip Robertson
- Edited by: Harry B. Miller III
- Music by: Guy Farley
- Production companies: Matador Pictures; Midnight Picture Show; Plum Films; E-Motion
- Distributed by: Essential Entertainment
- Release date: September 22, 2009
- Running time: 100 minutes
- Country: United Kingdom
- Language: English

Book of Blood, also known as Clive Barker's Book of Blood, is a 2009 British horror film directed by John Harrison and starring Jonas Armstrong, Sophie Ward, and Doug Bradley. It is based on the framing stories "The Book of Blood" and "On Jerusalem Street (a postscript)" from Clive Barker's series of horror fiction collections, Books of Blood, and it is the first film adaptation, followed by Books of Blood (2020).

== Plot ==
A hooded, disfigured young man is eating at a diner, being watched by a stranger. The stranger is Wyburd (Clive Russell), who has been stalking the young man, Simon (Jonas Armstrong). Wyburd convinces Simon to join him in his truck, where Simon passes out and awakens strapped to a table. Wyburd offers him a choice: a slow death, or a quick and clean death by telling the story of the Book of Blood, a series of scars and inscriptions carved on Simon from head to toe. Opting for a clean death, Simon reveals his story.

A teen girl is violently raped and beaten in her bed while her parents stand outside screaming her name. An unseen force rips her face off, killing her. Several months later, paranormal professor Mary Florescu (Sophie Ward) and her partner Reg Fuller (Paul Blair) investigate the house to unlock its mysteriously murderous past. Mary encounters Simon McNeal, a seemingly clairvoyant young man to whom she develops an attraction. Simon reluctantly signs on to assist, and the three of them move in. Early on, Mary hallucinates six girls dancing in a circle, playing ring-around-the-rosy. When they stop and look at her, they are all ghosts.

All three of them hear and witness strange phenomena, including Simon being locked in his room and attacked by ghosts, as well as writing scrawled on walls that bursts into flame. Reg convinces Mary to take a sample of the walls and send it in for analysis.

Mary and Simon grow closer, eventually sleeping together. While she sleeps, a dragonfly lands on her, and she has a vision of bloody skeletons dancing in a fountain. She admits that as a girl, she had visions of a fountain that spouted blood at night, the burial ground of a serial killer's young victim. She feels guilty because she never said anything, and he killed five more girls before being caught. When she goes to leave the house, she sees a final message on the walls - "You didn't listen."

The lab gets back to Mary and says the substances on the walls is gunpowder - perfect for making a wall appear to burst into flame. Mary realizes that Simon has been faking some of the phenomena, and confronts him; he admits his deception, but argues that some of it is not him, that his powers stopped when he was 13 but they have returned and he thinks it is Mary. Mary begins to pack up her belongings and drink, but begins to have visions of some of the people who have died. Before she can leave the house, she doubles over and throws up, and realizes Simon smuggled the gunpowder in with the pills. She and Reg break down all his other tricks.

Simon confronts Mary and Reg and says that the house has chosen him - he's supposed to be there. He tells her she will beg to write his story when it's over, and returns to the room, stripping off his shirt. Another dragonfly lands on Mary's hand, and she looks at it. As all of Reg's equipment begins to go crazy, dragonflies land on Mary's eyes and mouth. When Reg comes to tell her about his equipment, the room is swarming with dragonflies. Mary says she realizes the house is an intersection that allows the dead to spill over into their world. She says Simon has led them to a crossroads, and Reg contradicts her - it's not Simon, it's Mary. She is the key to opening the way for the ghosts; her powers were what awakened them.

Simon is again attacked by ghosts; this time, they carve into his flesh with nails and glass shards. Mary runs to find him, ghosts slowly descending the stairs past her as she ascends. Reg runs after her, but is startled by a terrifying ghost and falls over the railing to his death. When Mary enters Simon's room, she sees a vast haunted panorama filled with ghosts. She swears to the ghosts that she will listen this time; she will tell all of their stories. The ghosts heed her words and depart, allowing Simon to survive the ordeal.

Simon reveals to Wyburd that he was from then on kept prisoner, cursed to be the book on which the dead write while Mary wrote books and made millions off of the stories portrayed on him. As she aged, he remained the same youthful appearance, only more scarred with new stories for her to write. He admitted he couldn't take it anymore, so he fled, hence the reason Wyburd was hired to remove his skin. Wyburd, unmoved, lives up to his end of the bargain and kills Simon quickly. After placing his skin neatly into a suitcase, he waits for his payment. Blood suddenly starts pouring from the case, slowly filling the building that Wyburd is trapped in, and he drowns. Mary arrives, and is unfazed by Wyburd's body. She opens the suitcase, pulls out Simon's intact skin, and smiles as she begins to read the stories still being written upon the flesh.

== Cast ==
- Jonas Armstrong as Simon McNeal
- Sophie Ward as Mary Florescu
- Clive Russell as Wyburd
- Paul Blair as Reg Fuller
- Romana Abercromby as Janie
- Simon Bamford as Derek
- James Watson as Jimmy
- Doug Bradley as Tollington
- Gowan Calder as Janie's Mother
- Graham Colquhoun as Simon's Father
- Marcus McLeod as Janie's Father
- James McAnerney as Doctor Nigel Blake
- Joy McBrinn as Waitress
- Charlie McFadden as Joanne
- Jack North as Simon (age 11)
- Andrew Scott-Ramsay as Male Student
- Siobhan Reilly as Cashier
- Jill Riddiford as Woman
- Isla Stewart as Simon's Mother
- Greig Taylor as Stevie McNeal
- Emma Trevorrow as Child #1
- Hannah Bottone as Child #2
- Kirsty McEachran as Child #3
- Louise McCourt as Child #4
- Hannah O'Malley as Child #5
- Adele Swordy as Child #6
- Sophie Franklin as Child #7
- Martin Brettle as Ghost
- Javed Khan as World War I and 80s Ghost
- Rhys Maitland-Jones as Contemporary Dead Guy
- Roman Green as Ghostly Apparition

== Production ==
Adapted and directed by John Harrison from one of Clive Barker's Books of Blood, the film shoot occurred in Scotland, including Dundas Castle and Edinburgh through December 2007 and into early 2008. Following exposure at the 2008 European Film Market, and the completion of the FX shoot in London Book of Blood premiered in North America premiere during the Montreal Fantasia film festival on 13 July 2009. Book of Blood is the seventh story to be adapted from Barker's collection, following Rawhead Rex (filmed in 1986), The Forbidden (filmed in 1992 as Candyman), The Last Illusion (filmed in 1995 as Lord of Illusions), The Body Politic (filmed in 1997 within Quicksilver Highway), and The Midnight Meat Train. During his appearance at Fangoria's Weekend of Horrors, he noted that the film would be followed by Dread, Pig Blood Blues, and then Madonna.

== Release ==
The film premiered on 7 March 2009 as part of the Hamburg Fantasy Filmfest Nights. It was released the week of 28 September 2009 in the UK.

== See also ==
- List of ghost films
