= Books of the Art =

Trilogy of novels by Clive Barker

Books of the Art or The Art Trilogy
- The Great and Secret Show; Everville
- Author: Clive Barker
- Language: English
- Published: 1989 – current
- Media type: Print, e-book

Books of the Art or The Art Trilogy is a planned trilogy of novels by British writer Clive Barker, currently consisting of The Great and Secret Show (1989) and Everville (1994). As of 2025 the untitled third novel in the series, which Barker claims will be "a big book when it comes" and that will be written with "as much feeling as possible" has no scheduled release date.

The trilogy has been cited as an example of Barker's use of magic as a motif to "comment upon the work of the creator of art" and Barker himself has used the term to describe transformative magic that is used as "windows through which to glimpse the miraculous". The series thus far has been compared to J. R. R. Tolkien's The Lord of the Rings.

== Synopsis ==
=== The Great and Secret Show ===
The Great and Secret Show follows Fletcher and Jaffe, two humans that have transcended reality to become super-human. The two initially worked together but became adversaries when it became clear that Jaffe was intent on gaining control of Quiddity, a dream sea that humans can access only three times in their lives. The two men end up siring children by raping four teenage girls with the intention that they will continue their battles, only for two of their children to fall in love.

=== Everville ===
Everville delves deeper into the mythology of the cosm (essentially, Earth) and the metacosm (another plane of existence containing the dream sea Quiddity). The character Harry D'Amour appears in the novel as a main character and some of the characters from the previous novel also make appearances.

=== Untitled third novel ===
Concerning the main themes of the third novel, Barker stated in 2012:

I think what the third book will concern itself with is what the very origins of Quiddity, what the connection between humanity's origin and the origin of the conscience—the dream consciousness—that is there in the Sea of Quiddity, what that connection is. I've always believed in the idea of a collective unconscious, and Quiddity is really that. It's the sea we enter, as the mythology goes, where we enter once on the night when we are born, once on the night when we first kiss, and fall in love with the world, and once at the time we die. At the most serious and profound moments in our lives, we are given a moment to enter this place of pure dreaming, and that's fascinating, my fascination with dreaming. My dreams are mirrors of my soul. I'm hoping that will all be reflected in the third and final book.

In 2014 he confirmed via Facebook that the book would be written and that he has "figured out" how he would write the ending. Barker also stated in 2015 that he will not write the third Art book until he has finished the last novel in The Books of Abarat series, which he said could take years and would also be dependent on whether or not he will write the sequel to Galilee first.

== Reception ==
Critical reception for the trilogy to date has been mixed. Common elements of criticism tend to center around the number of characters and subplots, which caused an Everville reviewer to write that "when you weed out the subplots, you find there is no main plot". Author David Foster Wallace was critical of The Great and Secret Show and wrote that while the book was "not without some cool sections" it was also overly pretentious. Publishers Weekly panned the first novel but praised the second, which they felt "confirms the author's position not only as one of horror's most potent and fertile minds but also as one of modern fiction's premier metaphysicians".

== Comic book series ==
Between March 2006 and May 2007 IDW Publishing released a 12-part comic book adaptation of The Great and Secret Show. A complete collection of the comics was released in 2007.
