= The Midnight Meat Train =

2008 horror film by Ryuhei Kitamura

- Theatrical release poster
- Directed by: Ryuhei Kitamura
- Screenplay by: Jeff Buhler
- Based on: "The Midnight Meat Train" by Clive Barker
- Produced by: Clive Barker; Jorge Saralegui; Eric Reid; Richard Wright; Tom Rosenberg; Gary Lucchesi
- Starring: Bradley Cooper; Leslie Bibb; Tony Curran; Brooke Shields; Roger Bart; Vinnie Jones
- Cinematography: Jonathan Sela
- Edited by: Toby Yates
- Music by: Robb Williamson; Johannes Kobilke
- Production companies: Lakeshore Entertainment; Midnight Picture Show; GreeneStreet Films
- Distributed by: Lionsgate
- Release dates: July 19, 2008 (Fantasia Film Festival); August 1, 2008 (United States)
- Running time: 98 minutes
- Country: United States
- Language: English
- Box office: $3.5 million

The Midnight Meat Train is a 2008 American horror film based on Clive Barker's 1984 short story of the same name. Its plot follows a photographer who attempts to track down a serial killer dubbed the "Subway Butcher", and discovers more than he bargained for under the city streets.

Directed by Ryuhei Kitamura, the film stars Bradley Cooper, Leslie Bibb, Brooke Shields, Roger Bart, Ted Raimi and Vinnie Jones. Its script was adapted by Jeff Buhler, the producer was Tom Rosenberg of Lakeshore Entertainment, and it was released on August 1, 2008. The film received mixed reviews. Producer Joe Daley, a long-time friend of Buhler's, brought the two writers together and helped develop the script, along with producers Anthony DiBlasi and Jorge Saralegui, for their and Clive Barker's production company Midnight Picture Show, which was responsible for Book of Blood, the next film adaptation from the anthology of short stories that spawned The Midnight Meat Train.

== Plot ==
City-based photographer Leon Kaufman wants to capture unique, gritty shots of life on the streets. He is crushed when, instead of giving him his big break, the gallery owner, Susan Hoff, criticizes Leon for not taking enough risks. Emboldened, Leon heads into the city's subway system at night, where he takes pictures of an impending sexual assault before saving the woman, who kisses Leon before running to catch the subway. The next day, Leon discovers that the same woman he encountered has gone missing. Intrigued, he investigates reports of similar disappearances. Leon's investigation leads him to a butcher named Mahogany, whom he suspects has been killing subway passengers for the past three years.

Leon presents his photos to the police, who dismiss his claims. Leon's involvement quickly turns into a dark obsession, straining his relationship with his girlfriend, Maya. Leon follows Mahogany onto the last subway train of the night, only to witness him killing several passengers and hanging their bodies on meat hooks. After a brief scuffle with Mahogany, Leon passes out on the train, awakening the next morning in a slaughterhouse with strange markings carved into his chest.

Concerned about Leon's behavior, Maya and her friend Jurgis examine his photos of Mahogany, leading them to the killer's apartment. After breaking in, Jurgis is captured, though Maya escapes with timetables that record over 100 years of murders on the subway. She goes to the police, who are still skeptical about the murders. When police detective Lynn Hadley presses Maya to return the timetables, she furiously demands answers. Hadley reluctantly directs her to take the midnight train to find Jurgis. At the same time, Leon heads to a hidden subway entrance in the slaughterhouse, arming himself with several knives.

Leon boards the train right before Mahogany completes his latest killing and corners a defenseless Maya. He attacks Mahogany with a knife, and the two fight in between the swinging human flesh. Human body parts are ripped, thrown, and used as weapons. Jurgis, hung from a meat hook, dies when he is gutted. The train reaches its final stop, a cavernous abandoned station filled with skulls and decomposing bodies. A conductor soon appears and asks Leon and Maya to "step away from the meat." The true purpose of the abandoned station is revealed as reptilian creatures enter the car and start eating the bodies of the murdered passengers. Leon and Maya flee into the cavern. Mahogany, battered, reappears and fights Leon, who stabs a broken femur through Mahogany's throat, killing him.

The same conductor tells Leon the creatures had lived beneath the city long before the subway was constructed, and the butcher's job is to feed them each night to keep them from attacking subway riders during the day. He picks up a weakened Leon and, with the same supernatural strength as Mahogany, rips out Leon's tongue and eats it. The conductor brings Leon's attention to Maya, who has been knocked unconscious and is lying on a pile of bones. The conductor forces Leon to watch as he cuts Maya's chest open and removes her heart. He says that, having killed the butcher, Leon must take his place.

Sometime later, Hadley hands a train schedule to the new "butcher", who wears a ring with the symbol of the group that feeds the creatures. The butcher is revealed to be Leon as he boards the midnight train.

== Cast ==
- Bradley Cooper as Leon Kaufman
- Leslie Bibb as Maya Jones
- Brooke Shields as Susan Hoff
- Roger Bart as Jurgis
- Ted Raimi as Randle Cooper
- Vinnie Jones as Mahogany
- Peter Jacobson as Otto
- Barbara Eve Harris as Det. Lynn Hadley
- Tony Curran as Driver
- Stephanie Mace as Leigh Cooper
- Nori Satô as Erika Sakaki
- Dan Callahan as Troy Taleveski
- Quinton Jackson as Guardian Angel
- Allen Maldonado as Lead Gangbanger

== Production ==
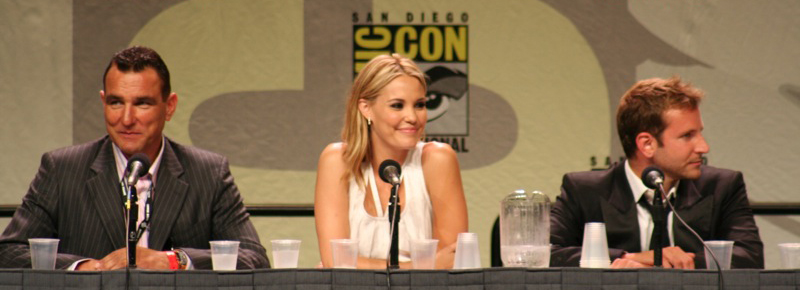
Vinnie Jones, Leslie Bibb, and Bradley Cooper at San Diego Comic-Con promoting the film in July 2007

The film's original director, Patrick Tatopoulos, originally planned to shoot the film in 2005 in New York City and Montreal. Tatopoulos left the production in 2006 and was replaced by Ryuhei Kitamura. Shooting was moved to Los Angeles, due to the prohibitive cost of shooting in New York City. Various locations, including the L.A. Metro subway system, were used instead. Shooting began on March 18, 2007.

=== Music ===
The "official" soundtrack from Lakeshore Records (only containing two remixes of the separately available actual film score) was produced and remixed by Justin Lassen and includes the bands and artists Iconcrash, Breaking The Jar, Blind Divine, Manakin Moon, Three Dot Revelation, Apocalyptica, Slvtn, Alu, Robert Williamson, Johannes Kobilke, Second Coming, Illusion of Order, Jason Hayes, Gerard K Marino, Penetrator, and Digital Dirt Heads.

== Release ==
Initially, The Midnight Meat Train was set for a May 16, 2008, release but was delayed. Ultimately, the film's release on August 1 was limited to the secondary market, of which only 100 screens showed it, with plans for a quick release on DVD. The world premiere was on July 19, 2008, at the Fantasia Festival in Montreal, in the presence of director Ryuhei Kitamura. An internet campaign was started by several horror websites to draw attention to the scaled-down theatrical release.

Barker was angry with Lionsgate's treatment, believing the studio's president Joe Drake to be shortchanging other people's films to focus more attention on films like The Strangers, where he received a producing credit: "The politics that are being visited upon it have nothing to do with the movie at all. This is all about ego, and though I mourn the fact that The Midnight Meat Train was never given its chance in theaters, it's a beautifully stylish, scary movie, and it isn't going anywhere. People will find it, and whether they find it in midnight shows or they find it on DVD, they'll find it, and in the end the Joe Drakes of the world will disappear."

The Midnight Meat Train was released theatrically in Australia on February 19, 2009. DVD and Blu-ray releases followed on July 14.

== Reception ==
On the review aggregator website Rotten Tomatoes, 70% of 33 critics' reviews are positive, with an average rating of 5.9/10. The website's consensus reads: "A creative and energetic adaptation of a Clive Barker short story, with enough scares and thrills to be a potential cult classic." Metacritic, which uses a weighted average, assigned the film a score of 58 out of 100, based on 4 critics, indicating "mixed or average" reviews.

In a review written for The Austin Chronicle, Marjorie Baumgarten awarded the film a score of 2½ out of 5 and wrote, "The Midnight Meat Train, at least until it crumbles in the last act, is a well-done horror movie that harks back to the slasher films of the Eighties." Ken Hanke of Mountain Xpress praised The Midnight Meat Train, deeming it the best English-language horror film of 2008 and writing, "Well, Midnight Meat Train may be no classic of the genre, but it's certainly a better and more interesting film than most of what passes for horror movies these days." In a review written for PopMatters, Bill Gibron opined that the "splatter noir" film was "part genius, part genre excess" in which the ideas of short story author Clive Barker were "wholly realized in brilliant fashion." Jenni Miller of Première gave the film a score of 3/5 and wrote, "While it's difficult to make a short story into a feature length film, and Midnight definitely has its hiccups, director Ryuhei Kitamura's slick direction and Barker's grotesque details make it stand out from today's slew of remakes and sequels."

Luke Y. Thompson of LA Weekly found the film's plot weak, but had an otherwise positive response to it, calling it "worth the trip" with an ending that was "so totally nuts, you've gotta admire the cojones behind it." Kaleem Aftab of The National criticized the film's story and "cartoonish" special effects, but admitted, "Nonetheless, there is a sprightly energy to the proceedings and a neat twist that makes this mindless fun something of a guilty pleasure." Nigel Floyd of Time Out gave the film a score of 3/5 and found that, while it matched the brutality of the Clive Barker short story on which it was based, it lacked the short's "undertow of skin-crawling, mind-curdling horror." While highly critical of the film's "patently ridiculous" finale, Rob Nelson of Variety still commended aspects of it like the acting and atmosphere and concluded, "Film isn't scary, per se, but it's mostly effective nonetheless."

The Midnight Meat Train was labeled a "fan film" by Tim Cogshell of Boxoffice Pro, who gave it a score of 2½ out of 5 and wrote, "It’s intense, perhaps, beyond reason. But one supposes that's the point. Still, one cannot fathom why anyone would deliberately put themselves through such a thing as this, beyond the requirements of one's occupation—say, film critic or coroner." Phelim O'Neill, in a review written for The Guardian, offered mild praise to the film's "unrestrained attitude to gore" and visuals, but lambasted its "rudimentary characterisation and tired jump/scare tactics" and ultimately awarded The Midnight Meat Train a grade of 2/5. Chris Willman of Entertainment Weekly was dismissive of The Midnight Meat Train, giving it a "D" grade and writing, "Jones is a terrifically imposing villain as he slays and flays late-night subway commuters—but the gorefest shifts from a suspenseful '80s slasher template to laughable fantasy/conspiracy mythology, culminating in a finale that redefines train wreck."
