= Lord of Dreams =

Lord of Dreams can mean:

- Dream (character), in Neil Gaiman's The Sandman fictional universe
- Nightmare (Marvel Comics), in the Marvel Comics fictional universe

== See also ==
- Lord of Illusions
