= Alu (musician) =

Los Angeles based eclectic chanteuse/composer

- Origin: Los Angeles, California
- Genres: Experimental pop, dark cabaret, trip hop, jazz
- Occupations: Singer-songwriter, composer, musician
- Years active: 2004–present
- Labels: Alu Music, Lakeshore Records

Alu is a Los Angeles–based eclectic chanteuse and composer who blends cabaret, goth, trip-hop and jazz into unique cinematic soundscapes.

Alu is featured on the soundtrack to Clive Barker's The Midnight Meat Train, Public Radio International, NPR and Echoes Radio. Her post-apocalyptic ballad "Last Lullaby" is included in the 2007 controversial action thriller "Juncture" by film director James Seale.

Alu's song "Circus Cosmos" was Echoes Radio Producer/Host John Diliberto's No. 1 Song of 2008 and her second CD "Lobotomy Sessions" made his Top Ten List of 2008 for Best Album. "Lobotomy Sessions" was also one of Echoes 25 Essential Albums of 2008 (Staff Picks and Listeners' Poll).

Alu was nominated for two 2009 Just Plain Folks Music Awards in the Female Singer Songwriter Category: Best Album ("Lobotomy Sessions") & Best Song ("Buzzin' in my Brain"). On October 12, 2009, Alu's album "Lobotomy Sessions" placed number 33 in the Top 200 CDs for 20 Years of Echoes Radio.

== Discography ==
- Alu: Alu's Not Dead (2021)
- Alu: Mrs. Hypochondriac (2016)
- Alu: Madhouse Masquerade (2012)
- Still: Echoes Living Room Concerts Volume 15: Features a Live In-Studio Performance of Alu's song "Recluse" (2009)
- Clive Barker's The Midnight Meat Train soundtrack: (Remix of Alu's song "Recluse" by Justin Lassen) (2008, Lakeshore Records)
- Alu: Lobotomy Sessions (2008)
- Digital Bliss Volume 1 compilation: ("Confessions to the Undertaker") (2007, Boutique Electronique Records)
- Music in A Net Volume 1 compilation: ("Last Lullaby") (2006)
- Novocain: Alu provides special guest back-up vocals on "Heartbeat" (2005, Blue Pie, Mugatu Records)
- Alu: Infomercial Gasmask (2004)
