= Jorge Saralegui =

Cuban-American film producer and writer

Jorge Manuel Saralegui (born 1953) is a Cuban-American film producer and screenwriter. Born in Cuba, he was raised in Bronxville, New York, later graduating with a degree in creative writing from Antioch College.

== Career ==
In 1987, he relocated to Los Angeles, California to pursue script writing. A year later, he was hired as a studio reader at Universal Pictures. Following a brief stint as a story analyst at Daniel Melnick's The IndieProd Company, he joined 20th Century Fox in 1989 as a script reader.

At Fox, he was promoted to a junior creative executive position, then, in June 1995, to senior vice-president of production. Two years later, he was appointed executive vice-president of production. There, Saralegui ushered Speed, Independence Day, Broken Arrow and Die Hard With a Vengeance through the development and production processes, and oversaw the productions of Speed 2: Cruise Control, Alien: Resurrection and Great Expectations.

In late 1997, he negotiated with studios to launch his own film label, settling at Warner Bros. in 1998, where he founded on-lot production company Material Films, with Channing Dungey serving as president.

In 2005, he co-founded horror film production company Midnight Picture Show with Clive Barker.

=== Fiction ===
His writings have appeared in literary magazines and an anthology, Latinos in Lotusland. Saralegui's first novel, Last Rites, was published by Putnam Berkley in 1985, followed by Shadow Stalker in 1987, then Looker in 1990.

A fourth novel, Sentimental Surgery, was a quarterfinalist in the 2019 ScreenCraft Cinematic Book Competition.

== Filmography ==
He was a producer of the listed films, unless otherwise noted.

=== Film ===
Year	Film	Credit	Notes
2000	Red Planet		Warner Bros.
2002	Queen of the Damned		Material Films
2002	The Time Machine	Executive producer	Material Films
2002	Showtime		Material Films
2004	The Big Bounce		Material Films
2006	The Plague		Midnight Picture Show; direct-to-video
2008	The Midnight Meat Train		Midnight Picture Show
2009	Book of Blood		Midnight Picture Show
2009	Dread		Midnight Picture Show
2016	Paradox	Executive producer	
2016	Kill Ratio	Executive producer	

As writer

Year	Film
2002	Showtime
2018	Incoming

Recognition

Year	Film	Role
2015	The Idol	Special thanks
