= Quiddity =

Essence or inherent nature of thing

In scholastic philosophy, "quiddity" (/ˈkwɪdɪti/; Latin: quidditas) is another term for the essence of an object, literally its "whatness" or "what it is".

== Etymology ==
The term "quiddity" derives from the Latin word quidditas, which was used by the medieval scholastics as a literal translation of the equivalent term in Aristotle's Greek to ti ên einai (τὸ τί ἦν εἶναι) or "the what it was to be (a given thing)".

== Overview ==
Quiddity describes properties that a particular substance (e.g. a person) shares with others of its kind. The question "what (quid) is it?" asks for a general description by way of commonality. This is quiddity or "whatness" (i.e., its "what it is"). Quiddity was often contrasted by the scholastic philosophers with the haecceity or "thisness" of an item, which was supposed to be a positive characteristic of an individual that caused it to be this individual, and no other. It is used in this sense in British poet George Herbert's poem, "Quiddity". Example: What is a "tree"? We can only see specific trees in the world around us - the category "tree" which includes all trees is a classification in our minds, not empirical, and not observable. The quiddity of a tree is the collection of characteristics which make it a tree. This is sometimes referred to as "treeness". This idea fell into disuse with the rise of empiricism, precisely because the essence of things, that which makes them what they are, does not correspond to any observables in the world around us.

== Other senses ==
- In law, the term is used to refer to a quibble or academic point. An example can be seen in Hamlet's graveside speech found in Hamlet by William Shakespeare. "Where be his quiddities now, his quillets, his cases, his tenures" says Hamlet, referring to a lawyer's quiddities.
- Quiddity is the name for the mystical dream sea in Clive Barker's novel The Great and Secret Show that exists as a higher plane of human existence. It is featured as more of a literal sea in the novel's sequel, Everville, and the related short story, "On Amen's Shore".

== See also ==
- Hypokeimenon
- Ousia
- Problem of universals
- Quidditism
- Similarity (philosophy)
- Substance theory
- Tathātā
