= Lord of Illusions =

1995 film by Clive Barker

- Theatrical release poster
- Directed by: Clive Barker
- Screenplay by: Clive Barker
- Based on: "The Last Illusion" by Clive Barker
- Produced by: Clive Barker; Joanne Sellar
- Starring: Scott Bakula; Kevin J. O'Connor; Famke Janssen; Daniel von Bargen
- Cinematography: Ronn Schmidt
- Edited by: Alan Baumgarten
- Music by: Simon Boswell
- Production companies: United Artists; Seraphim Productions
- Distributed by: MGM/UA Distribution Co. (United States); United International Pictures (International)
- Release date: August 25, 1995
- Running time: 109 minutes
- Country: United States
- Language: English
- Budget: $9-11 million
- Box office: $13.3 million

Lord of Illusions is a 1995 American neo-noir supernatural horror film written and directed by Clive Barker, based on his own short story "The Last Illusion" published in 1985 in the anthology Books of Blood Volume 6. The same story introduced Barker's occult detective Harry D'Amour, who later appeared in several prose stories and comic books. Lord of Illusions is D'Amour's first onscreen appearance, with the character portrayed by actor Scott Bakula. Other actors appearing in the film include Kevin J. O'Connor, Famke Janssen and Daniel von Bargen. The story features D'Amour, who has had several experiences with the supernatural, embarking on an investigation involving a stage illusionist named Swann and a cult led by a sorcerer named Nix.

Although Clive Barker decided to keep a few story elements and the same principal characters from "The Last Illusion", he otherwise presented a new story for the movie and created a new villain, surprising several readers familiar with the original work. The film met with mixed reception and no further live-action movies featuring Harry D'Amour were made.

== Plot ==
In the Mojave Desert in 1982, a man named William Nix, also calling himself "The Puritan", has gathered a cult of disciples in an old house. Nix wields real magic and plans to sacrifice a girl, telling his followers he will save the world and grant them wisdom. A group of former cult members, including Philip Swann and Caspar Quaid, arrive to stop him. In the confrontation, Nix's assistant Butterfield escapes. Philip is attacked magically by Nix, but the kidnapped girl shoots Nix through the heart with Swann's gun, enabling the renegade cultists to overcome Nix. Swann fastens an ironwork mask over Nix's head in order to "bind" him and his power. They then bury him in an unmarked grave.

Thirteen years later, in New York City, occult-specializing private detective Harry D'Amour has been shaken by an exorcism case. He accepts a case of insurance fraud in Los Angeles, hoping the experience will be akin to a paid vacation. During his investigation, D'Amour happens upon Quaid, now working as a fortune teller, being attacked by Butterfield and Ray Miller, a man possessing great strength. Butterfield and Miller escape. As he dies from multiple stab wounds, Quaid reads D'Amour's palm, seeing it is his destiny to "walk the line between Heaven and Hell." He warns that the Puritan is coming, then dies.

Philip, now a famous stage illusionist, lives in a Beverly Hills mansion with his wife, Dorothea. Philip believes Quaid was killed by Nix's loyalists. Before he can leave Los Angeles, D'Amour is hired by Dorothea, who read about him in the newspaper story about Quaid and wants him to protect her husband. D'Amour agrees to investigate if Quaid's killers are targeting Phillip, and Dorothea invites him to his next magic show. A new illusion goes wrong, and Philip is killed on stage, stabbed by multiple swords. Investigating backstage, D'Amour is attacked by Butterfield and Miller, killing the latter in self-defense while Butterfield escapes. The next day, D'Amour goes to the Magic Castle. After getting into the Repository, a room supposedly containing every magic secret known to man, D'Amour discovers Philip's "illusions" involved real magic he learned from Nix.

Dorothea reveals to D'Amour that she was the girl Nix kidnapped years ago, rescued by Philip and marrying him out of gratitude and obligation. Dorothea and D'Amour make love; afterwards, D'Amour is attacked by supernatural forces. Suspecting a ruse, D'Amour opens Philip's coffin and finds the body is fake. Valentin, Philip's assistant, explains that Philip faked his death to protect himself and Dorothea from Nix, who may return from the dead. D'Amour agrees to continue the ruse. At Philip's funeral, D'Amour follows a suspicious man who turns out to be Philip, who attacks D'Amour out of jealousy before admitting he masqueraded as an illusionist so he would be wealthy rather than hunted as a sorcerer. D'Amour convinces him that together, they can defeat the loyal cultists and Nix, if he is resurrected.

Butterfield tortures Valentin for the location of Nix's body, then takes Dorothea hostage. After finding Nix's corpse, Butterfield stabs Valentin and takes the corpse back to the cult's house in the desert. Nix's loyalists (who had waited all this time and slaughtered their families before returning) are present as his iron bindings are removed, resurrecting him. Nix, now decayed and monstrous in appearance, promises to share his knowledge and power. Acting on information given by the dying Valentin, Swann and D'Amour arrive. Nix opens a deep chasm in the ground that swallows the cultists, declaring only Swann is worthy of his knowledge.

Nix drops Dorothea into the chasm, but D'Amour rescues her and kills Butterfield. Nix reveals that his true purpose was never to save the world but to destroy it utterly. He offers Philip the opportunity to assist him, to which Philip reluctantly agrees but admits he still cares for Dorothea. Out of jealousy, Nix attacks with magic, apparently killing Philip. Dorothea finds D'Amour's gun and shoots Nix in his mystical third eye. He retaliates, saying she should not have taken Philip away because he and Nix were meant to be together after humanity was destroyed.

Philip uses the last of his life energy and magic to help D'Amour deliver a final blow to Nix, then dies of his wounds. Nix falls to the bottom of the chasm and plunges into a pool of molten rock. After a somber moment, D'Amour senses something is rising from the chasm, so he and Dorothea flee the room. While burning in the pit, Nix manages to launch a final spell that disintegrates Philip's body to bones, and then seals the chasm. Dorothea and D'Amour escape the house and walk off into the desert together.

== Cast ==
- Scott Bakula as Harry D'Amour
- Kevin J. O'Connor as Philip Swann
- Famke Janssen as Dorothea Swann
- Daniel von Bargen as William Nix
- Vincent Schiavelli as Vinovich
- Barry Del Sherman as Butterfield
- Sheila Tousey as Jennifer Desiderio
- Joel Swetow as Valentin
- Joseph Latimore as Caspar Quaid
- Susan Traylor as Maureen Pimm
- Ashley Lyn Cafagna as Young Dorothea
- Wayne Grace as Loomis
- Jordan Marder as Ray Miller
- J. Trevor Edmond as Young Butterfield
- Barry Shabaka Henley as Dr. Toffler
- Billy McComb as Walter Wilder
- Carrie Ann Inaba as Dancer
- Ken Davitian as Audience Member
- Danny Woodburn as Forensics Photographer

== Conception and casting ==
In the original 1985 story "The Last Illusion", Harry D'Amour has had only one previous encounter with the supernatural, having fought a demon in Brooklyn, and is still shaken by the experience. He is asked to guard the body of dead illusionist Swann by the man's wife Dorothea, leading him into a confrontation with more demons, including the story's antagonist Butterfield. The story is a mix of detective noir and horror. Barker wrote another D'Amour short story called "Lost Souls", which was published in a 1987 anthology called Cutting Edge. D'Amour then appears briefly in Barker's 1989 novel The Great and Secret Show, the first book of the "Book of the Art" trilogy. He returned as a major character in the 1994 novel Everville, the second installment of the "Book of the Art" trilogy, a year before Lord of Illusions hit theaters.

Clive Barker had directed and written two previous film adaptations of his own work, Hellraiser (1987) and Nightbreed (1990), and had served as screenwriter and executive producer on Hellbound: Hellraiser II (1988). Lord of Illusions was the third film he wrote and directed. According to an interview with Fangoria in 1992, Barker started the first draft of the screenplay in 1991, at which time the movie shared its title with the original short story "The Last Illusion". In an interview with Bloody Best of Fangoria in 1993, Barker said: "I've always loved illusionists. There's always a dark side, and illusionists present them to you. It's very much life-and-death illusion - you sawed the woman in half, but she's still alive. They're presented as breezy, funny, entertaining pieces - but, subtextually, they're stories of death and resurrection".

Regarding how to translate D'Amour's character and the original short story, Barker said in an interview with Fangoria (#138, 1994) that "The Last Illusion was almost a Philip Marlowe type of thing, but this movie isn't a homage to '40's noir. ... We're really just focusing on this everyman who is drawn into the heart of darkness over and over again because of some karmic thing which he has no power over".

Clive Barker claimed he picked Famke Jannsen based purely on her photograph and that he considered Scott Bakula to be the perfect casting for D'Amour in both appearance and manner. On the documentary "The Making of Lord of Illusions" included on the director cut's laser disc release, Bakula said: "It helped tremendously to have the writer saying, 'You're the guy, you're perfect for Harry'. Still I had to come up with my own interpretation of Harry - who he was - and bring this 40s film noir detective into the 90s and make him seem fresh and new and relevant to these situations that only Clive could put him in".

In the original short, Butterfield is a demon in human disguise and the main antagonist. In the film adaptation, Butterfield was made into a human acolyte of the new villain Nix, a cult leader who becomes a vessel for demonic power. In an interview with Cinescape in 1995, Barker explained: "Halfway through shooting this picture, somebody came in with a newspaper with a headline about these mass deaths in a cult in Switzerland [the Order of the Solar Temple]. I don't think we even yet know quite what happened there. The craziness of Waco, the craziness of Jonestown, the Manson stuff - Nix is the embodiment of the charismatic leader who says, 'Follow me to death', which is something that's part of our culture. So I thought, supposing we had a villain like that, but instead of this guy just being somebody who can weave words and make promises, he genuinely has a greater power? That, to me, is scary and interesting".

Barker told SFX (#16, 1996): "One of the things I wanted to do with Nix was to make him very uncharismatic. There is nothing appealing about this man and towards the end of the movie, when the temptation would be to go into apocalyptic mode, the movie pulls in exactly the opposite direction. Nix becomes this frail, rather pathetic creature. In one of the final scenes, Dorothea asks the metaphysical question, 'What are you?' And Nix says, 'I'm a man who wanted to be a god and changed his mind'. And I like that. I like the fact that he is just a man. He wanted to be something more but he gave up on this useless endeavor. He's murdered all his acolytes, his devotees, and now he's alone in the dark. I actively went after that, even though it was flying in the face of what the audience expects".

== Production ==
Clive Barker said: "I had four or five images in my head which were starting places for scenes: the look of the magic show - Swann's spectacular - which we've staged at the Pantages; the look of Nix's lair; the cultists' house; the look of the Bel-Air mansion where Swann and his wife, Dorothea, reside and actually Harry's apartment - that was a late addition ..." The entire film was laid out in storyboards prior to filming.

The magic-show accident was filmed at the Pantages Theatre in Hollywood.

Reflecting on the film in the 1996 documentary "The Making of Lord of Illusions", Clive Barker said: "I can look through the movie and... every two or three minutes I'm saying, 'Geez, why did I do that? Why did I do this?' Well, the answer is, you know, I got 50 things right and 30 things wrong and that's a pretty good batting average for me! You make your work and you move on - and you do that whatever medium you work in".

=== Editing ===
On seeing Barker's cut of the film, MGM decided that it was too long and there was too much time spent on dialogue scenes that occur in-between scenes involving death or horror elements. MGM insisted on removing roughly twelve and a half minutes from the film and Barker conceded as long as a director's cut could be released later. This director's cut was initially released on VHS and laserdisc, then on DVD and streaming services and was designated unrated, whereas the theatrical release was rated R by the MPAA. It is also known as the Collector's Edition.

In 1996, Barker commented: "It's not twelve and a half minutes of blood and gore [that was removed], it's actually the thematic guts of the movie. What MGM/UA did, and I'll think they're wrong till the end of my days, was say that this isn't enough of a horror movie, we want to make it more intense. It was a bad commercial decision in my view. They wanted to take out some of the detective elements. I said no. Part of the point of the movie is that it is a genre-breaking movie. It moves from film noir to horror and back and forth and that's what makes the movie work. But MGM/UA was adamant". Barker did manage to get a shot of a dead child on the floor which MGM/UA wanted deleted into the theatrical cut by editing it out and then editing it back in later.

MGM/UA's cuts were at least partially supported by test screenings; Barker said that at the first test screening, audiences reacted negatively to the explicit sex and said that there were too many dialogue-heavy scenes, and reacted much more positively to the edited cut which was shown at a later screening.

The director's cut includes more bloodshed on the helmet screws when Swann binds Nix. A scene with Butterfield's face burning lasts longer and involves more bloodshed. A kiss D'Amour and Dorothea Swann share is longer in the director's cut and leads into a sex scene that is largely missing from the theatrical version. Extra scenes include: Valentin coming to D'Amour's hotel room to hire him at Dorothea's request; Valentin driving Harry to meet Dorothea; a dream Harry has involving the Swann case and the supernatural creature he encountered in Brooklyn; Harry formally meeting Walter Wider at the Magic Castle and chatting with him before he is given a tour; D'Amour briefly speaking to Valentin on the phone before calling Billy to meet him at the Magic Castle; brief scenes of Nix's followers killing their families and leaving to reunite in the cult's old compound; Dorothea dreaming of Nix's followers and compound, then waking to discover her housekeeper dead and Valentin wounded; a discussion between Philip Swann and D'Amour regarding Nix's power, teachings, and goal as they ride in a car together.

== Critical reception ==
The film received mixed reviews, with an approval rating of 54% at Rotten Tomatoes based on reviews from 28 critics and the critical consensus "Lord of Illusions may come as something of a disappointment in the context of writer-director Clive Barker's best work, but genre fans should be reasonably diverted". Audiences polled by CinemaScore gave the film an average grade of "C+" on an A+ to F scale.

Roger Ebert gave the movie three out of four stars and complimented its visual effects as well as Bakula's performance. He remarked that while horror fans would be primarily drawn to the film's gory special effects finale, it was the suspenseful build-up which convinced him to recommend the film. Richard Harrington of The Washington Post, in contrast, found the effects were neither viscerally convincing nor psychologically disturbing. He added: "Playing the antihero D'Amour, Bakula is appropriately rumpled but seems emotionally uncommitted, and his out-of-the-blue bedding of Dorothea is laughable. More problematic is the villain: Despite some gross burned-skin makeup and nasty-as-he-wants-to-be attitude, Nix is scarry, not scary". He cited Cast a Deadly Spell as a film which much more effectively combined the film noir and horror genres. Joe Leydon of Variety called the film "a much more conventional effort than Barker’s earlier outings", while also finding it "more sophisticated and satisfying than anything the genre has offered since Wes Craven's New Nightmare". Leydon said Bakula's "virile good looks, low-key humor and matter-of-fact authority make him an engaging Everyman, the perfect traveling companion for a journey through Barker’s nightmare world". However, he found Kevin J. O'Connor's performance failed to bring out the strong thematic traits of Swann.

In a retrospective review, Karl Williams wrote in AllMovie that Lord of Illusions "starts off strong with an intriguing premise, but then goes quickly nowhere". Contradicting Leydon, he argued that Bakula's everyman demeanor makes him completely inappropriate for the role of D'Amour, and found the script confusing. Like Harrington, he compared the film unfavorably to Cast a Deadly Spell. In a 2015 article on the film in Deadly magazine, Patrick Bromley wrote: "Twenty years after it was first released, Lord of Illusions remains Barker's least-loved film". He argued that its lukewarm reception was undeserved, praising its plot development and the character of Harry D'Amour.

== In popular culture ==
- Front Line Assembly uses samples from the movie on their album [FLA]vour of the Weak on the tracks "Autoerotic", "Colombian Necktie" and "Life=Leben" as well as on the single "Colombian Necktie" on "Colombian Necktie (GOArge Mix)".
- Front Line Assembly side-project, Noise Unit, uses samples from the movie on their album Drill on a number of tracks: "The Drain", "Dominator", "Miracle", "Eye Burner".
- Underground hip-hop artists Jedi Mind Tricks sample the movie on the track "The Immaculate Conception".
- Heavy metal group Nevermore uses samples from the movie on their album Dreaming Neon Black, specifically on the intro track "Ophidian".
- Goregrind group Last Days of Humanity uses a sample from the movie to begin their album The Sound of Rancid Juices Sloshing Around Your Coffin, on the intro track "Born to Murder the World" (a quote from Nix in the film).
