= Kill Ratio =

- Directed by: Paul Tanter
- Written by: Steven Palmer Peterson
- Produced by: Rick Benattar; Nigel Thomas; Tristan Lynch
- Cinematography: Patrick Jordan
- Edited by: Laurens Van Charante
- Music by: Alexander Bornstein
- Production companies: Benattar Thomas Productions; Parkside Pictures; Subotica; Tadross Media Group
- Distributed by: XLrator Media
- Release date: December 9, 2016 (US)
- Running time: 86 minutes
- Country: United States
- Language: English

Kill Ratio is a 2016 American action-thriller film directed by Paul Tanter. It stars Tom Hopper, Amy Huberman, Nick Dunning, Lacy Moore, Luke Pierucci, and Brian McGuinness. Hopper plays a CIA operative who helps restore a democratically elected president to power after a military coup. It was shot in Ireland and is set in a fictional Eastern European republic.

== Plot ==
James Henderson, a liaison between a corporation and a newly democratic country in Eastern Europe, assists his supervisor, Gabrielle Martin, as she attempts to set up a lucrative contract to develop the country. Before she can close the deal, a military coup deposes President Petrenko, and the news reports she has been killed. Henderson rushes Martin out of their hotel as everyone else panics. Henderson stays behind and retrieves a hidden pistol. Soldiers led by ex-KGB agent Vorza quickly take over the hotel, preventing anyone else from leaving. Henderson easily evades capture, encountering Matt Gibbons, an American who is also there for the contract. The two discuss their theories of who is behind the coup, settling on General Lazar, a ruthless would-be dictator.

As Henderson scouts the hotel, he sees Martin return. She explains that she found Petrenko alive but wounded, and, not knowing where else to go, returned to the hotel, as the hospitals were under guard by rebel military forces. Henderson helps Martin hide Petrenko in the hotel, and he performs field surgery on her. Trained as a pediatrician, Petrenko asks where he learned his skills, but Henderson declines to answer. Lazar soon arrives at the hotel, drawn to its symbolic importance to his people and the camera crews there to cover the contract. Vorza assures him that Petrenko is dead and the hotel is secure. Henderson is forced to kill several soldiers to protect civilians and Petrenko, and Vorza eventually realizes she is there. Henderson knocks him unconscious before he can alert Lazar.

Petrenko says she must broadcast a message of hope to her people before Lazar can cement his leadership. As Martin cleans up their hotel room to hide evidence of Petrenko's existence, Henderson tails Lazar. Henderson realizes Gibbons is working for Lazar when he sees the two secretly meet, and he searches Gibbons' room. Gibbons surprises him and demands to know who he works for. Henderson eventually admits he is ex-CIA, though he claims to be plotting against Lazar with Vorza. He talks Gibbons into letting him meet Lazar. Before they can, the two run into Petrenko, who has just saved Martin from a rapist soldier. Vorza and several of his men also appear. Henderson admits he was lying, and Gibbons orders Vorza to kill them all.

Henderson holds off Vorza's men while Petrenko and Martin broadcast an inspirational message. While Henderson is busy fighting soldiers, Lazar, Gibbons, and Vorza arrive. but they are too late to stop Petrenko. Gibbons discourages Lazar from killing her, saying it will scare off future foreign investors. Vorza agrees, though he suggests they flee the country with what money they already have and take her hostage. When Gibbons objects to giving up their business prospects, Lazar kills him. Before Lazar can also kill Petrenko, Henderson arrives and challenges him to a sword duel – Lazar had previously executed a Petrenko loyalist with a sword. After Henderson wins, another Petrenko loyalist kills Vorza before he can shoot Henderson. With Lazar and Vorza dead, Petrenko restores order. Henderson and Martin leave together, and he promises to answer all her questions about his background.

== Cast ==
- Tom Hopper as James Henderson
- Amy Huberman as Gabrielle Martin
- Lacy Moore as Tania Petrenko
- Brian McGuinness as Vorza
- Luke Pierucci as Matt Gibbons
- Nick Dunning as General Lazar
- Michelle Lehane as Anastasia

== Production ==
The film was executive produced bu Barry Gordon, Michael Radiloff and Jorge Saralegui, and filmed in Howth, Ireland, as The Fixer.

== Release ==
XLrator Media released Kill Ratio to theaters in Los Angeles on December 9, 2016, and video on demand four days later.

== Reception ==
John DeFore of The Hollywood Reporter called it "an uninspired bore" and criticized the dialogue. Maitland McDonagh of Film Journal International wrote that the film "delivers respectable action, [but] in the end it fails to rise above from the constraints of its genre and budget". Michael Rechtshaffen of the Los Angeles Times called it "a laughably inept political thriller that would have been right at home on the USA Network lineup circa 1990". Luke Y. Thompson of LA Weekly wrote that the film's concept could work if remade with a better budget and actors who weren't trying to conceal an Irish accent.
