= Books of Blood =

Series of fiction anthologies collecting original stories

- Books of Blood Omnibus, volumes 1–3
- Author: Clive Barker
- Cover artist: Clive Barker
- Language: English
- Series: Books of Blood
- Genre: Horror
- Publisher: Sphere Books (UK)
- Publication date: 1984–1985
- Publication place: United Kingdom
- Media type: Print (Hardcover and Paperback)

Books of Blood is a series of six horror fiction anthologies collecting original stories written by English author, playwright, and filmmaker Clive Barker in 1984 and 1985. Known primarily for writing stage plays beforehand, Barker gained a wider audience and fanbase through this anthology series, leading to a successful career as a novelist. Originally presented as six volumes, the anthologies were subsequently re-published in two omnibus editions containing three volumes each. Each volume contains four, five or six stories. The Volume 1–3 omnibus contained a foreword by Barker's fellow Liverpudlian horror writer Ramsey Campbell. Author Stephen King praised Books of Blood, leading to a quote from him appearing on the first US edition of the book: "I have seen the future of horror and it is named Clive Barker."

Books of Blood Volume 6 is significant for its story "The Last Illusion" which introduced Barker's occult detective character Harry D'Amour. The detective went on to appear in more of Barker's writings, the Hellraiser comic book series from Boom! Studios, and the 1995 film Lord of Illusions (based on "The Last Illusion" and adapted by Barker himself).

== Overview ==
Clive Barker's tagline for Books of Blood was: "Everybody is a book of blood; wherever we're opened, we're red." The opening story, "The Book of Blood", introduces the premise of the anthology series by revealing that a fake psychic is attacked one night by genuine ghosts and spirits who decide to make him a true messenger by writing stories into his flesh. This makes him a "Book of Blood" and the narration then invites the reader to read these stories. The UK editions of Volume 6 close with a story, "On Jerusalem Street", that features a man who pursues the fake psychic in order to skin him and take his Book of Blood. Thus, a framing story is created around the anthologies.

The stories range in genres. Some are traditional horror, some are described by Barker as "dark fantasy," some are comical, and "The Last Illusion" is notable for being a mixture of horror and noir while also introducing the occult detective Harry D'Amour. A common thread is that most of the stories feature everyday people in contemporary settings who become involved in violent, mysterious, and/or supernatural events. Barker has stated in Faces of Fear that an inspiration for the Books of Blood came when he read Dark Forces in the early 1980s and realised that a horror story anthology didn't need to have narrow themes, consistent tone or restrictions to be considered a proper collection. Instead, the stories could range wildly in genre and tone, from the humorous to the truly horrific.

Volumes I-III are sold as "The Books of Blood", Volume IV is sold as "The Inhuman Condition", Volume V is sold as "In the Flesh", and Volume VI is sold as "Cabal", which includes four or five additional short stories, depending on the edition.

For some editions, Clive Barker illustrated the book covers.

== Stories ==
=== Volume One ===
==== "The Book of Blood" ====
The first story of Volume 1 acts as a frame story to the Books of Blood anthology series (along with "On Jerusalem Street", the closing story presented in UK editions of Volume 6).

The story mentions that the afterlife involves "highways of the dead" that sometimes intersect with the living world. A psychic researcher, Mary Florescu, has employed a young medium named Simon McNeal to investigate a haunted house. Unknown to Florescu, who is attracted to McNeal, the man is a fraud. He fakes visions as he has done many times before, pretending to hear names and stories told to him from beyond the mortal world; but this time ghosts assault him, carving names and "minute words" into his flesh, leaving his body covered in stories – the stories of this anthology series. Florescu nurses the young man and begins transcribing his tales, thinking of him as a "Book of Blood" and her as his only translator.

This prologue, along with closing story "On Jerusalem Street" from Volume 6, was adapted and directed twice. First for the film Book of Blood by John Harrison and then for the 2020 Brannon Braga film Books of Blood.

==== "The Midnight Meat Train" ====
Office worker Leon Kaufman has recently moved to New York City, a place that he has long idolised as "The Palace of Delights." Since arriving, he has become disillusioned, seeing the dirt and depravity in a city like any other. Meanwhile, a man named Mahogany is killing people in subway trains, identifying as a "Butcher" in pursuit of "fresh meat." Kaufman falls asleep on a late-night subway train to Far Rockaway, Queens, and awakens to discover that Mahogany has killed four passengers in the neighbouring car and the train conductor is cooperating with him. After Kaufman kills Mahogany in self-defense, the train arrives at a secret station where ancient, withered humans board and consume the bodies. The creatures, the "City Fathers," have been the secret rulers of New York for centuries, the people who founded and initially built the city. They eventually present Kaufman to the incomprehensible "Father of Fathers," who has lived there since before the arrival of the first humans in America. One of them pulls out Kaufman's tongue, stating that he will "serve in silence," and recruits him as their new Butcher tasked with bringing them fresh meat. Kaufman passes out as the conductor announces the next destination as "home." Kaufman is later awakened by the conductor in a secret, pristine subway station and helped off the train as cleaning crews come on to cover up the previous night's events. The conductor states that he has much to learn before he begins his job that evening and presents him to the cleaners, who look at him with reverence. He exits the station and goes onto the streets in the early morning as the city wakes up and comes alive. He falls to his knees, kisses the ground, and swears his loyalty to the city.

A film starring Bradley Cooper and Vinnie Jones was released on 1 August 2008. The film dramatically expands the book in many ways, most notably by introducing additional characters such as Maya, Leon's girlfriend, and further events outside the main plot.

==== "The Yattering and Jack" ====
Jack Polo is a gherkin importer who is haunted by a minor demon called the Yattering. The demon is commanded to haunt Jack by Beelzebub, because one of Jack's ancestors reneged on a pact made with the demon lord. The Yattering is frustrated when its determined efforts to drive Jack insane are answered with good cheer and apparent obliviousness. Unknown to the Yattering, Jack is purposely ignoring the demon in order to simultaneously frustrate it and maintain his own sanity. The Yattering subjects him to increasingly severe torments, including killing his cats and terrorising his family, but these efforts all fail. Eventually Jack tricks the Yattering into violating its orders, allowing Jack to take advantage of a loophole and make the Yattering his slave.

In contrast to the other stories, this one is presented as a comedic tale. Barker wrote a screenplay adapting this story for an episode of the horror TV series Tales from the Darkside (Season 4, episode 7; 8 November 1987).

==== "Pig Blood Blues" ====
Former policeman Neil Redman starts working in a borstal as a woodwork teacher, where he uncovers a deadly secret involving a boy named Lacey. Lacey claims that a missing boy named Henessey is not actually missing, but still present as a ghost. As Redman investigates, he finds that Lacey and the students believe a giant sow in a sty on the grounds may be possessed by Hennesey's ghost, and that Lacey fears he will be fed to the sow. Redman discovers the borstal's other staff and students preparing to ritually sacrifice Lacey at the sty, and after discovering Hennesey's decaying and half-eaten corpse within, he goes to call for help, only to then being captured and presented to the sow while being hanged. It speaks in Hennessey's voice and commands the pig-possessed Lacey to consume him.

==== "Sex, Death and Starshine" ====
Terry Calloway is directing Twelfth Night in a run-down theatre. He is having an affair with his leading lady, Diane Duvall, and hopes her soap opera fame will bring in a big audience but also considers her a poor actress. A mysterious masked man, Mr. Lichfield, expresses dissatisfaction with Diane's casting as Viola. On the day of the final rehearsal, Lichfield states that his wife, Constantia, will play the role on opening night. Diane removes Lichfield's mask to reveal him as an animated corpse. Lichfield kisses Diane, and she slips into a coma. Constantia takes over the role of Viola. Following Diane's "recovery", Terry has sex with her and realises she is now undead, just before she kills him. The play opens to a packed house. After the performance, the actors realise the audience consists entirely of ghosts and reanimated dead. The theatre trustee, newly-dead Tallulah, burns down the theatre and every living player is killed. Several of the actors and Terry then join Mr. Lichfield and Constantia on the road, becoming a repertory company of the undead.

==== "In the Hills, the Cities" ====
In an isolated rural area of Yugoslavia, two entire cities, Popolac and Podujevo, create massive communal creatures by binding together the bodies of their citizens. Almost 40,000 people walk as the body of a single giant as tall as a skyscraper. This ritual occurs every ten years, but this time things go wrong and the Podujevo giant collapses, horribly killing tens of thousands of citizens. In shock, the entire population of Popolac goes mad and becomes the giant they are strapped into. Popolac wanders the hills aimlessly. By nightfall, many of the people who make up the giant die from exhaustion, but the giant continues walking. Mick and Judd, two gay men on honeymoon in the area, come upon the smashed bodies of the Podujevans in a ravine awash with blood. A local man tries to steal their car to catch up with Popolac and reason with it before it collapses and destroys the people who compose it. The man explains the truth of the situation to Mick and Judd, but they do not believe his story. They seek shelter at a remote farm, where Popolac blunders into the farmhouse, accidentally killing Judd. Mick and the elderly couple who own the farmhouse are driven mad with fear. Mick wants to join Popolac. He climbs up the tower of ropes and bodies, and is carried away as it walks into the hills.

A line from this story, "stale incense, old sweat, and lies," appears in the song "Sin" on the album Pretty Hate Machine by the American industrial band Nine Inch Nails.

=== Volume Two ===
==== "Dread" ====
Steve, a young university student, becomes acquainted with an older classmate named Quaid, an intellectual who has a morbid fascination with dread. Quaid reveals to Steve that he kidnapped a vegetarian classmate of theirs and imprisoned her in a room with merely beef for sustenance, only releasing her when she finally overcame her dread of eating meat to prevent starvation; she eats the meat even though it has spoiled. Steve becomes Quaid's next candidate for his experiments, held captive in a dark, silent room, forcing him to relive a childhood period of deafness that terrified him. Steve is driven insane by this forced sensory deprivation and eventually escapes. Steve then happens into a homeless shelter where he is mistaken for a drug-addicted vagrant and is given new clothes and shoes, but these don't fit him well. He is mad, pale with shock, and his lips are red and chapped from dehydration. Later, Steve steals a fire axe from the shelter and breaks into Quaid's home. Quaid's experiments, all along, were to try to help him understand the nature of fear in order to cure his own coulrophobia, but he is ironically butchered by Steve, whose ghastly appearance, ill-fitting clothes, and over-sized shoes have given him the appearance of a clown.

This story has been made into a film, with Jackson Rathbone playing Steve. The film diverges from the short story and introduces new characters, but retains some basic concepts.

==== "Hell's Event" ====
Every one hundred years, during an annual London marathon, Satan sends one of his representatives to compete against (unsuspecting) human runners. If Satan's minion wins, he gets to rule the Earth. An athlete taking part in the event, Joel, realises the actual stakes of the race when the other runners begin to fall, ravaged by some unseen beast. A satanist politician, Gregory, has made a bargain with Hell on the outcome of the race. Before he can win, Joel engages in a struggle with Hell's runner, who bites off his face. As they struggle, the last surviving human runner makes it to the finish line and Hell loses once again. Gregory is punished for his overconfidence by being gruesomely slain.

==== "Jacqueline Ess: Her Will And Testament" ====
Jacqueline Ess, a housewife struggling with depression and ennui, attempts suicide and is found by her husband. She recovers only to find that she has an ability to manipulate people's flesh and bodies. Disturbed by his attempts at sedating her, and by his lack of sympathy and understanding of her condition, Jacqueline kills her therapist and then causes her husband's death by willing their bodies to tear apart or fold in on themselves. She temporarily finds peace with a man named Oliver Vassi, whose testimonies make up part of the text. After an unspecified amount of time, she leaves him in order to pursue a rich and powerful man, Titus Penifer, in the hopes of learning from him "how to use power." Their relationship continues despite his inadequacy as a lover, until he attempts to break up after being blackmailed by an employee. Jacqueline kills the extortioner in cold blood and escapes, while Titus grows further obsessed with her and tracks her down. After having her imprisoned, he begs her to kill him. Jacqueline comes to the realisation that all the men in her life, with the exception of Vassi, have used her for their own interests, and refuses to murder Titus. Instead, she warps his body into that of an animal, and one of his bodyguards shoots him in disgust. Vassi manages to track Jacqueline down in Amsterdam, where she has become a sex worker whose clients only survive one night with her. She is shown to be losing control of her powers, and when she is reunited with her old lover they embrace each other and willingly die together.

This story is also published in the book I Shudder at Your Touch as well as in "Behold! Oddities, Curiosities & Undefinable Wonders".

==== "The Skins of the Fathers" ====
After his car breaks down in Arizona, a man named Davidson witnesses a bizarre parade of monsters. He learns creatures mated with a woman in a nearby town six years before and now wish to reclaim Aaron, the child she bore. The woman's abusive alcoholic husband knows of the creatures and that they are mostly benevolent, but wants to take revenge on them for impregnating his wife. It is implied that all modern humans originally came to be as a result of similar relationships between these creatures and primordial women, but over time male humans drove the creatures to the brink of extinction. Davidson reaches the town, where a posse of gun-toting locals are eager to slay the monsters. After a violent confrontation in which the townsfolk manage to kill one of the largest creatures along with Aaron, the remaining creatures vanish and arrange for Davidson and a few survivors to become trapped in quicksand, which then hardens when they are half-buried. Trapped, they are left to die in the burning desert heat.

The idea of a group of people sinking in quicksand which then hardens around them was later used by Barker in the film Lord of Illusions.

==== "New Murders in the Rue Morgue" ====
Lewis is a 73-year-old man who goes to Paris after his womanizing friend, Phillipe, is arrested for butchering a young woman. After insisting that an orangutan committed the murder, Phillipe commits suicide in his cell. Lewis does not believe the story until he sees the primate firsthand. The beast is dressed like a person, completely shaved, and lives in Philippe's old apartment, attempting to replicate the behaviors of a man. Lewis learns that Philippe, a notorious eccentric, raised the animal himself as a strange experiment based on the Edgar Allan Poe story "The Murders in the Rue Morgue". It is implied that the orangutan killed the young woman by accident, tearing her apart while attempting to have sex, in imitation of Philippe's sexual escapades. Despairing at the fact others seem unable to see the orangutan as the animal it is, Lewis throws himself into the Seine, as the orangutan continues to present and live as a human.

=== Volume Three ===
==== "Son of Celluloid" ====
An escaped convict dies behind a film screen while hiding from the police. Over the months following his death, a cancerous tumour in the convict's body gains sentience from the strong emotions of the cinema's audiences and comes to life. After one night's show, the creature hunts down several patrons remaining in the cinema, projecting images of John Wayne and Marilyn Monroe as vivid hallucinations to lure them in and consume them, but it is seemingly destroyed in turn by the cinema's usher. Some time later, the usher, having tracked down a girl who escaped after being taken over by the creature, confronts it with acid and kills it once and for all.

==== "Rawhead Rex" ====
During an unusually warm summer in rural Kent, the ancient monster Rawhead, a nine-foot tall malevolent humanoid, is accidentally awakened from his underground imprisonment. Rawhead goes on a rampage through a local village, killing and eating several townsfolk, corrupting the local verger to serve him and fatally wounding the village's vicar, Reverend Coot. The vicar lives long enough to instruct local man Ron Milton, father of one of Rawhead's victims, to find a talisman within the church to fight the beast; the talisman depicts a pregnant woman, Rawhead's antithesis and the only thing he fears. While Rawhead attempts to burn down the village, Milton uses the talisman to stall him long enough for the enraged villagers to overpower and kill him.

"Rawhead Rex" has a structure similar to Alien or The Thing from Another World, but uses a rural setting. The story was later turned into the film Rawhead Rex (1986), which Barker wrote but then disowned after being dissatisfied with the direction and overall production.

==== "Confessions of a (Pornographer's) Shroud" ====
Ronnie is a rule-abiding Catholic falsely implicated by the Mafia to be the leader of a pornography cartel. After killing two mobsters in revenge, Ronnie is brutally tortured and murdered by the Mafia, after which he manifests as a ghost. Animating the shroud covering his body in the morgue, he takes revenge on the rest of his enemies. After being chased by the animated shroud, the mob boss primarily responsible for Ronnie's ordeal runs into his home, only to find his wife cheating on him with his assistant, so he shoots both of them dead. In a gory climax, the ghost enters the mouth of the mob boss and turns him inside out. Afterwards, the ghost uses his remaining few moments on Earth to knock on the door of a priest, wanting to receive last rites, but the priest is too busy photographing a naked girl and does not answer.

The story is written as a black comedy, revolving around the visual gag of a real ghost actually taking on the form of a floating bedsheet.

==== "Scape-Goats" ====
A yacht is stranded on the beach of a deserted island that is located at a point in the Atlantic Ocean where converging undersea currents bring all the human bodies of sailors drowned at sea. The hundreds of bodies littering the ocean floor, unfortunately for the stranded crew, are not as dead as they should be.

==== "Human Remains" ====
A young bisexual sex worker is hired by an archaeologist. During the course of the night, he stumbles into the bathroom to discover a Roman-esque statue of a man lying in the bath. Over the next few weeks, he has the sense of being haunted by a doppelgänger. At the same time, his mind and body transforms; he becomes cold and lifeless, no longer needing to eat or sleep. He finally discovers his doppelgänger, the statue from the bath, at his father's grave, crying in sorrow, as he is unmoved. It becomes clear that the doppelgänger has become more convincing as a human than he is, so he wanders away, allowing it to continue living in his persona.

=== Volume Four ===
Published and sold as "The Inhuman Condition".

==== "The Body Politic" ====
In a bizarre version of a revolution, it appears that all human beings' hands have their own consciousness and are not happy at being ordered what to do by their owners. The hands of a factory worker named Charlie plan to lead the revolution. Charlie's hands even have their own personalities, with Left being more cautious and Right being very determined and even proclaiming itself a Messiah. Right – against Charlie's own wishes – chops off Left, who scuttles away to summon other hands to do the same before returning to rescue Right, starting a violent revolution of human limbs. As hundreds of freed hands surge into the hospital to free Right, Charlie lures them to the rooftop and hurls himself off the edge, followed by the hands, which die with him and Right as they hit the ground. One human survivor, who lost his legs to a train while escaping, awakens to find his severed legs standing and watching him. Fearing the rest of his body will revolt, he waits, "...heart in mouth, for the fall of the Empire".

This story was later adapted and used, in part, for the film Quicksilver Highway.

==== "The Inhuman Condition" ====
A young man named Karney and his friends beat up a vagrant for fun. As they leave, Karney takes a strange knotted piece of string he finds on the vagrant. A keen fan of puzzles, Karney eventually undoes the first of the very intricate knots but in doing so, he releases a creature which proceeds to kill his friends. When the second knot is undone and the third seems almost to undo itself, two more creatures are released each progressively more advanced, appearing to evolve with each knot. But their true target is not Karney but the vagrant who enslaved them through his "forgotten science: the design of knots".

==== "Revelations" ====
A woman named Virginia is unwillingly taken on a tour through the U.S. by her unfeeling husband, a preacher named John Gyer. They stay at a motel which is visited by the ghosts of Buck and Sadie, a married couple who stayed there thirty years before. In the same room, Sadie shot Buck and was subsequently executed for the murder. Buck and Sadie find that Virginia has the ability to both see and hear them. Meanwhile, a scuffle ensues when John discovers that their driver, Earl, has been giving Virginia pills to help her deal with her anxiety issues. While looking for Earl to confront him about the pills, John finds the married driver in bed with Laura-May, the daughter of the motel owner. Virginia ends up with the same murder weapon used by Sadie thirty years prior, which Laura-May has kept as a souvenir. Virginia uses the gun to try to kill Buck's ghost, who managed partial materialisation in order to attempt to rape her, but the bullet goes through him and finds its way into John's throat, killing him. Virginia contemplates suicide but Sadie's ghost advises her to plead insanity. While being taken in by the local sheriff, someone asks her why she did it. Virginia answers, "The Devil made me do it" while gazing at the moon with "the craziest smile she (can) muster".

==== "Down, Satan!" ====
The shortest story of the collection relates the tale of a wealthy middle-aged businessman, Gregorius, who becomes depressed when he believes God has deserted him and he comes up with a plan to build a Hell on Earth to summon Satan, thinking that God will then sweep Gregorius out of Satan's clutches and into his heavenly fold. In his vast Satanic Cathedral, Gregorious soon loses sight of his original intention of attracting God's attention - he is arrested after torturing hundreds of people to death in the well-equipped torture chambers. It is deliberately left ambiguous whether Gregorius went insane or if he really did succeed in tempting Satan into taking residence in his own personal Hell.

==== "The Age of Desire" ====
A private laboratory runs experiments on volunteers to investigate the libido and try to develop a chemical aphrodisiac. One of the experiments goes wrong when a man suddenly goes insane with lust. His perpetual state of arousal erodes his respect for morality and the law. He rapes, murders and mutilates one of the scientists and then escapes to cause wanton mayhem, eventually burning himself out and dying.

=== Volume Five ===
Published in the United States as In the Flesh.

==== "The Forbidden" ====
Helen is a university student doing a thesis on graffiti who selects a run-down estate as a focus for her study. She notices disturbing graffiti that references an urban legend called the Candyman. Further inquiries lead her to believe this is connected with recent murders and mutilations, although the locals are reluctant to discuss the incidents. She suddenly encounters the Candyman himself, who is displeased at her skepticism of his existence. As the Candyman requires the belief of the estate's inhabitants to exist, she is lured by him into a bonfire on Bonfire Night, where she is burned alive as part of a sacrifice to contribute to his legend and continue the locals' belief in him.

This story was later adapted into the film Candyman (1992) by Bernard Rose.

==== "The Madonna" ====
A man named Jerry is trying to talk a local shady businessman, Garvey, into financing the redevelopment of an old swimming pool complex. However, both men discover the pool has some mysterious inhabitants in the form of nude teenage girls who flee should Jerry or Garvey encounter them. Curiosity leads the men to explore the complex and they separately discover a swimming pool in the centre. It is unlike the other pools in the building in that it is full, glows with a strange light, and appears to be inhabited by some misshapen life-form: the Madonna. After encountering the Madonna, Garvey discovers he is being physically reshaped and mutilates himself in horror before falling into the Thames and drowning, while Jerry returns home and wakes up the following morning to discover he has been transformed into a woman. When he returns to the complex to find it being demolished, he dives into the pool to join the girls and the Madonna within.

==== "Babel's Children" ====
A young woman named Vanessa Jape happens across a secluded compound in which a group of elderly scientists and scholars use their great minds to determine the outcome of major world events. After living there for many years in seclusion, their decisions have deteriorated and are now based on games of chance. When Vanessa and the men seek to flee the compound, they experience a car accident; all the elders are killed with the exception of one who refused to go along. Vanessa returns to the compound, forced to participate in the games of chance with the survivor until replacements can be found.

==== "In the Flesh" ====
A prison inmate named Cleve gets a new cellmate, a mysterious young man called Billy, who admits that he committed a crime with the sole intention of coming to this particular prison. Billy believes he has been summoned there by his grandfather Tait, a supposedly powerful sorcerer who was buried in the prison after his execution for murder many years before. Billy's efforts to summon Tait's spirit cause Cleve to be haunted by dreams of a purgatory for murderers, where killers are obliged to spend some portion of their afterlife in a replica of the scene of their crime. Later, Billy vanishes from his cell. His grandfather's coffin is exhumed and found to contain Billy curled up next to his grandfather's corpse. Once released, Cleve finds his travels to purgatory have left him able to hear when others have thoughts of murder. He becomes disillusioned with humanity and becomes a heroin addict to suppress his newfound powers. Cleve later commits a murder himself and is shot dead by the police. He spends an indeterminate amount of time in his own purgatory, then discovers escape is possible via reincarnation.

=== Volume Six ===
Several of these stories are also published in Cabal.

==== "The Life of Death" ====
Following a brush with cancer and a subsequent hysterectomy, a woman named Elaine becomes fascinated with a church that is being demolished. She encounters a cheerfully morbid man with skeletal features named Kavanagh, who shares her fascination. The demolition soon reveals a tomb of plague victims that had been fermenting for centuries, and Elaine breaks in at night to see the bodies. Later, when her friends begin to die off and the police come after her, Elaine takes refuge with Kavanagh, who she firmly believes is really Death. Kavanagh, a serial killer and necrophile, strangles and rapes Elaine. As her soul flees her body, Elaine feels a sick sort of glee when she realises that Kavanagh is now the carrier of the plague she contracted in the tomb, and will spread it far and wide.

==== "How Spoilers Bleed" ====
Several European mercenaries, led by a cold-hearted man named Locke, have bought land in the jungles of South America that is inhabited by a tribe of Amazonian natives. When the tribe refuse to leave, one of Locke's cohorts impulsively and accidentally shoots a native child dead. The elder of the tribe puts a curse on the men which strikes them down one by one with a gruesome condition that makes their bodies incredibly delicate; a mote of dust can slice their skin open, the soles of their feet crack when they stand, etc. After his men die off, Locke returns to the tribe to beg for forgiveness. However, when he gets there, the tribe has been massacred by some of his other colleagues. Locke begins to suffer the symptoms of the deadly curse just as he realises there is now no way of having it removed.

==== "Twilight at the Towers" ====
A British spy named Ballard stationed in Berlin meets with a KGB counterpart named Mironenko. After their meeting, Mironenko disappears. As Ballard investigates, he witnesses a vicious mauling, which in turn, leads him to discover that he and Mironenko are both werewolves, trained by each agency to defeat the other. Both governments raid their meeting place, causing Mironenko to transform fully. Ballard runs and wakes up in a fellow operative's house. Ballard's rival, Suckling, arrives and kills the agent, only to be killed by the transformed Ballard. Ballard seeks Mironenko, and finds him reading from the Holy Bible to a group of werewolves. The passages he has chosen strongly imply that Mironenko believes God wants them to rule over humankind.

==== "The Last Illusion" ====
The story begins when an illusionist named Swann is killed backstage by one of his own tricks, with several swords falling on him. Before his death, Swann gives his wife Dorothea a letter stating she must cremate his body immediately before enemies take action. Believing there are unseen dangers at play, Dorothea hires Harry D'Amour to guard the body, having read in newspapers that the private investigator seemingly encountered supernatural forces during a case in Brooklyn. D'Amour learns that the illusionist once made a deal with demons in order to possess actual magical power. With the assistance of Swann's underling Valentin, secretly a demon himself, D'Amour protects Swann's body and cremates it. A demon called Butterfield tells D'Amour that he is now marked as an enemy of the forces of Hell.

This story was the debut of Harry D'Amour, who would appear in other Clive Barker writings and eventually encounter Barker's popular creation the Hell Priest (Pinhead). This short story was later adapted by Barker himself into the 1995 film Lord of Illusions.

==== "On Jerusalem Street" (a postscript) ====
Only included in some UK editions of the Books of Blood, this tale is a sequel to "The Book of Blood" from Volume One, creating a framing story.

Wyburd is hired to obtain the stories of Simon McNeal, the Book of Blood, for a collector. He captures McNeal and skins him. Later, the skin bleeds and won't stop, finally drowning Wyburd. He ends up on the highways of the dead, where he tells his own story.

This story, along with the prologue from Volume One, was adapted and directed twice: first for the film Book of Blood by John Harrison, and then for the 2020 Brannon Braga film Books of Blood.

== Reception ==
With the publication of the first volume, Barker became an overnight sensation and was hailed by Stephen King as "the future of horror". The book won both the British Fantasy Award, and the World Fantasy Award.

Neil Gaiman reviewed Books of Blood for Imagine magazine, and stated that "for those of you who wonder how far it is possible for an author to go, you need look no further, as hands attempt to rule the world, frogs succeed (sort of), and there's something unpleasant behind every door."

== In other media ==
=== Comics ===
Eighteen of the stories in the Books of Blood have been adapted by Eclipse Books in the comic series Tapping the Vein as well as other titled adaptations.

=== Film and television ===
Novelette "Rawhead Rex":

- Rawhead Rex (1986), film directed by George Pavlou

Novelette "The Forbidden":

- Candyman (1992), film directed by Bernard Rose
- Candyman: Farewell to the Flesh (1995), film directed by Bill Condon, based on characters
- Candyman 3: Day of the Dead (1999), film directed by Turi Meyer, based on characters
- Candyman (2021), film directed by Nia DaCosta, based on characters

Novella "The Last Illusion":

- Lord of Illusions (1995), film directed by Clive Barker

Novelette "The Body Politic":

- "The Body Politic", first story of the TV movie Quicksilver Highway (1997) directed by Mick Garris

Novelette "The Midnight Meat Train":

- The Midnight Meat Train (2008), film directed by Ryuhei Kitamura

Novelette "Dread":

- Dread (2009), film directed by Anthony DiBlasi

Short stories "The Book of Blood" and "On Jerusalem Street":

- Book of Blood (2009), film directed by John Harrison
- Books of Blood (2020), TV movie directed by Brannon Braga

Novelette "The Yattering and Jack":

- Episode 7 of the fourth season of the television series Tales from the Darkside (1987), adapted by Clive Barker
