= Books of Blood (film) =

2020 anthology horror film

- Film poster
- Directed by: Brannon Braga
- Screenplay by: Adam Simon; Brannon Braga
- Based on: Books of Blood by Clive Barker
- Produced by: Seth MacFarlane; Michael Mahoney; Joseph J. Micucci; Jason Clark
- Starring: Britt Robertson; Anna Friel; Rafi Gavron; Yul Vazquez
- Cinematography: Michael Dallatorre
- Edited by: John Duffy
- Music by: Joel J. Richard; Tyler Bates
- Production companies: 20th Century Studios (copyright holder only); Beetlecod Productions; Seraphim Films; Fuzzy Door Productions; Touchstone Television
- Distributed by: Hulu
- Release dates: October 6, 2020 (Screamfest); October 7, 2020 (Hulu)
- Running time: 107 minutes
- Country: United States
- Language: English

Books of Blood is a 2020 American anthology horror film directed by Brannon Braga and co-written by Braga and Adam Simon. It is based on Books of Blood by Clive Barker and is the second film adaptation after Book of Blood (2009). The film premiered at the 2020 Screamfest Horror Film Festival on October 6, 2020, and was released on Hulu the following day. This was the final production by Touchstone Television before being folded into 20th Television.

== Synopsis ==
The film tells three stories, two of which are loose adaptations from the titular horror fiction anthology: "The Book of Blood" ("Miles") and "On Jerusalem Street" (a postscript) ("Bennett").

=== Jenna ===
Jenna Branson is a college student suffering from a disorder that makes certain noises unbearable. Unhappy at home, she decides to run away after becoming noncompliant with her medication. She begins to suspect that someone is following her and takes refuge at a bed and breakfast run by older couple Ellie and Sam Austin. Jenna bonds with a fellow guest named Gavin and with her host, Ellie. She begins to feel a connection with Ellie after experiencing delusions of bugs and continuing to see someone following her. She is horrified when she discovers that the couple have been paralysing their guests, removing their tongues, eyes, and ears, and hiding them within the house. Ellie uses her skills as a former health practitioner to keep her victims alive but sedated in the walls and hidden compartments of her home, in a warped belief that her actions are providing Ellie and Sam's victims with a better life.

Jenna is saved by her stalker, revealed to be the father of Jenna's former boyfriend who died by suicide. He is murdered by Ellie and Sam. His body is put in his car, which is driven away by Sam. Jenna manages to get into the backseat of the car and subsequently ends up trapped in the car as it goes over a cliff in a fake suicide set up by Ellie and Sam to dispose of the body of Jenna's former boyfriend's father.

=== Miles ===
Mary Floresky is approached by a psychic named Simon McNeal, who claims that he is communicating with her dead son Miles. While she is skeptical, Mary truly wishes to speak to her son and decides that this could be a beneficial experiment for her work. The experiment is seemingly successful and the two end up becoming a couple, also launching a foundation together. This happiness does not last, as Mary eventually discovers that not only is Simon unfaithful but he also faked the entire experiment. Later a devastated Mary sees her son's ghost and watches as a message entreats her to repeat the experiment with Simon.

Simon is initially unwilling to participate but does so when she mentions that it is necessary to raise funding for her work. Later Simon is in the room as multiple ghosts appear and carve their stories into his flesh.

=== Bennett ===
A bookseller owes money to shady people and Bennett has been hired to collect, along with his driver Steve. When he is unable to produce what is owed, the seller attempts to save his life by telling Bennett of the "Book of Blood", a rare tome worth a million dollars, that's located in an abandoned town. Bennett is intrigued by the story, but still kills the bookseller.

Together with Steve, Bennett travels to the abandoned town where both men experience inexplicable and supernatural phenomena. Steve is driven to shoot himself after hearing the voice of his dead mother, while Bennett is chased by their car. When he arrives at the purported location of the book, he discovers Mary, Simon, and the ghost of Miles. Bennett is unwilling to believe that Simon is the book, particularly after Mary tells him that he is now one of the stories. He is then chased outside, where he is tormented by visions until he stabs himself. Though severely wounded, Bennett manages to escape but is unfortunate in that he ends up at Ellie and Sam's home, where he is killed by Ellie.

Then, the scene moves to a hospitalized Jenna, who survived the crash. We have a flashback of her last phone call with her boyfriend, and we learn that she instigated him to jump from a roof. She cries as she recalls it, and returns to the evil couple, letting them drug and mutilate her like the others. Jenna is shown to be happy as she can no longer hear noises.

All these stories appear to be written on Simon's back, and read by Mary.

== Cast ==
- Britt Robertson as Jenna Branson
- Anna Friel as Mary Floresky
- Rafi Gavron as Simon McNeal
- Yul Vazquez as Bennett
- Freda Foh Shen as Ellie
- Nicholas Campbell as Sam Austin
- Andy McQueen as Steve
- Kenji Fitzgerald as Gavin
- Paige Turco as Nicole
- Saad Siddiqui as Dan
- Glenn Lefchak as Balsam
- Brett Rickaby as Bookseller
- Matt Bois as Peter
- Etienne Kellici as Miles Floresky
- Cory Lee as Chelsea

== Reception ==
On review aggregator website Rotten Tomatoes, the film holds an approval rating of 21% based on 28 reviews, with an average rating of 4.8/10. Metacritic reports a score of 42 out of 100 based on seven critic reviews, indicating "mixed or average" reviews.
