= Tom Hopper =

British actor (born 1985)

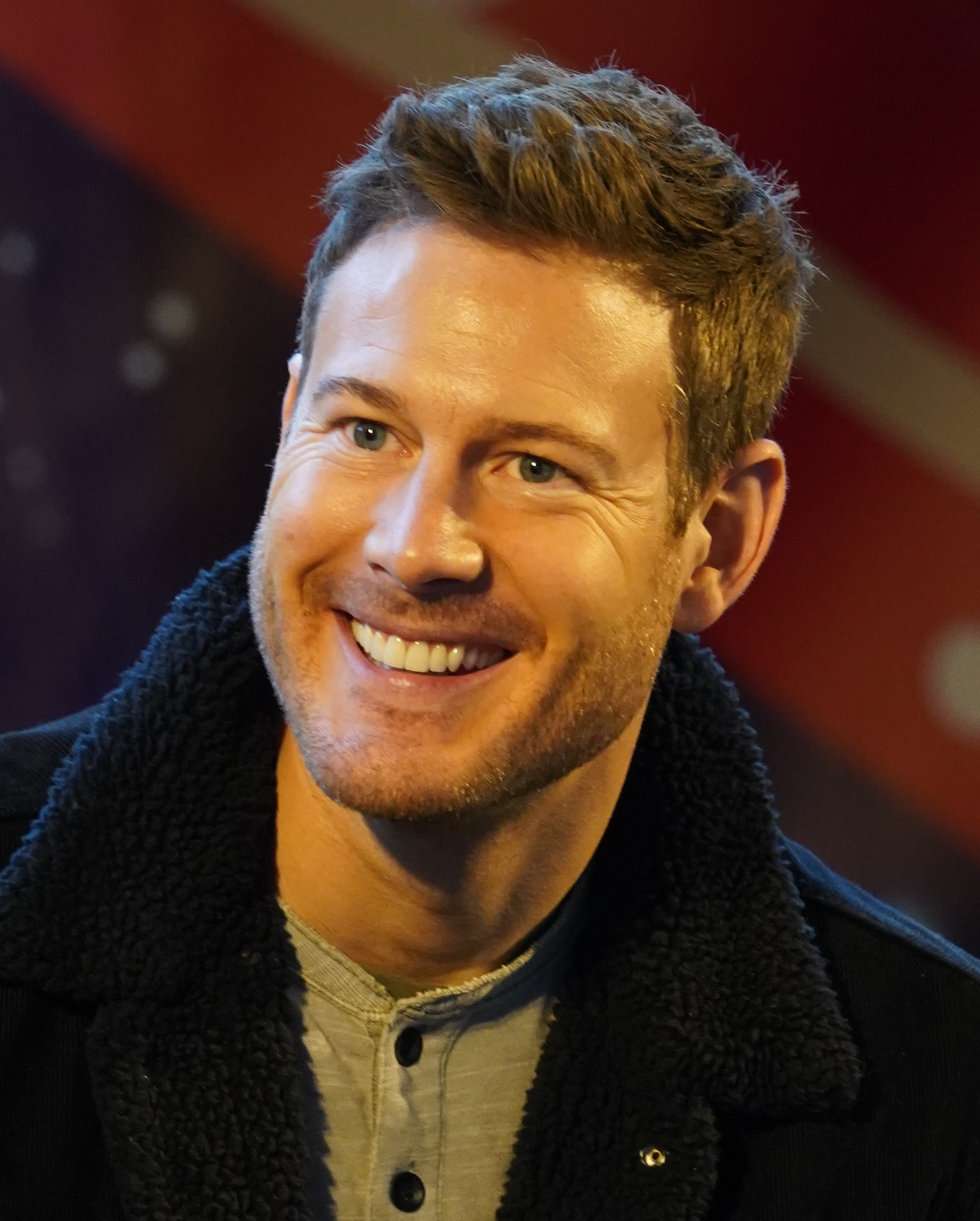
- Hopper in 2022
- Born: Thomas Edward Hopper; 28 January 1985 (age 41); Coalville, Leicestershire, England
- Occupation: Actor
- Years active: 2007–present
- Spouse: Laura Higgins (m. 2014)
- Children: 2

Thomas Edward Hopper (born 28 January 1985) is an English actor known for his roles as Percival in Merlin (2010–2012), Billy Bones in Black Sails (2014–2017), Dickon Tarly in Game of Thrones (2017), and Luther Hargreeves in The Umbrella Academy (2019–2024).

== Early life and education ==
Thomas Edward Hopper was born on 28 January 1985 in Coalville, Leicestershire. He attended Ashby School, where he first developed an interest in acting. He enrolled in a drama class and appeared in a production of the musical Return to the Forbidden Planet. He studied acting at Rose Bruford College.

== Career ==
Hopper was cast in As You Like It at the Watford Palace Theatre and has appeared in various television programmes and films including Saxon, Casualty, Kingdom and Doctors. Hopper portrayed Marcus in the comedy-horror film, Tormented about a bullied teenager who comes back from the dead to take revenge on his classmates. The film was released in May 2009.

In 2010, he was in an episode of Doctor Who. Hopper played Sir Percival in the BBC series Merlin. He joined the series in the third season in 2010, and was a regular for the next two seasons. After Merlin ended in 2012, he featured in Good Cop in 2012. In 2013, Hopper starred in Cold, directed and written by his Merlin co-star Eoin Macken. The film was later released in the United States as Leopard. In 2014, Hopper starred as Asbjörn in Northmen: A Viking Saga.

Hopper became the first actor to join the Starz series Black Sails, in which he portrayed Billy Bones. The pirate drama serves as a prequel to Robert Louis Stevenson's Treasure Island. Hopper deliberately chose to play Bones as a "selfless person, looking out for his crew", believing that the character would have changed dramatically in the time period between Black Sails and Treasure Island. The show was filmed on location in South Africa.

In 2016, Hopper appeared in the thriller Kill Ratio and an episode of Barbarians Rising. The following year, he joined the cast of the HBO series Game of Thrones in season 7 as Dickon Tarly, replacing Freddie Stroma who had previously appeared in the role in season 6. In 2018, Hopper appeared alongside Amy Schumer in I Feel Pretty. In 2019, Hopper appeared as Luther Hargreeves in The Umbrella Academy. For the role, Hopper wore a muscle suit to achieve the correct look and underwent martial arts training.

Hopper appeared in the 2020 film SAS: Red Notice. In March 2019, he joined the cast of Hitman's Wife's Bodyguard, which was released in 2021. Hopper starred in the Netflix film Love in the Villa which premiered 1 September 2022.

In 2021, he starred as Captain Albert Wesker, leader of S.T.A.R.S., and secondary antagonist of Resident Evil: Welcome To Raccoon City. An adaptation of the popular Resident Evil franchise's early stories, it included elements from the mansion incident, Raccoon Police Station attack, and bombing of Raccoon City from the first PlayStation games. He has expressed interest in returning to the role, stating in an interview about the film's reception, "I certainly hope to go back and play Albert Wesker again. It ended in a way where I was like 'Oh, I can get used to this guy.'"

== Personal life ==
Hopper married actress Laura Higgins in 2014. They have a son and daughter.

== Filmography ==
=== Film ===
| Year | Title | Role | Notes | Ref. |
|---|---|---|---|---|
| 2007 | Saxon | Fishmonger | | |
| 2009 | Tormented | Marcus | | |
| 2013 | Cold | Tom | Also known as Leopard | |
| 2013 | Knights of Badassdom | Gunther | Credit only | |
| 2014 | Northmen: A Viking Saga | Asbjörn | | |
| 2016 | Kill Ratio | James Henderson | | |
| 2018 | I Feel Pretty | Grant LeClair | | |
| 2019 | Terminator: Dark Fate | William Hadrell | | |
| 2021 | SAS: Red Notice | Declan Smith | | |
| 2021 | Hitman's Wife's Bodyguard | Magnusson | | |
| 2021 | Resident Evil: Welcome to Raccoon City | Albert Wesker | | |
| 2022 | Love in the Villa | Charlie Fletcher | | |
| 2023 | Place of Bones | Bear John | | |
| 2024 | Space Cadet | Logan O'Leary | | |

=== Television ===
| Year | Title | Role | Notes |
|---|---|---|---|
| 2007 | Casualty | Hugh "Chewy" Mullen | Episode: "Stitch" |
| 2008 | Doctors | Josh Mullen | Episode: "Don't Try This at Home" |
| 2008 | Kingdom | Soldier | Episode #2.3 |
| 2010 | Doctor Who | Jeff | Episode: "The Eleventh Hour" |
| 2010–2012 | Merlin | Sir Percival | Guest role (series 3); recurring role (series 4–5) |
| 2012 | Good Cop | Andy Stockwell | 3 episodes |
| 2014–2017 | Black Sails | William "Billy Bones" Manderly | Main role |
| 2016 | Barbarians Rising | Arminius | 2 episodes |
| 2017 | Game of Thrones | Dickon Tarly | 4 episodes |
| 2019–2024 | The Umbrella Academy | Luther Hargreeves / Number One | 36 episodes |
| 2020 | Robot Chicken | Eddie Brock, Solid Snake, John Rolfe (voice) | Episode: "Gracie Purgatory in: That's How You Get Hemorrhoids" |
| 2025 | The Terminal List: Dark Wolf | Raife Hastings | Main role |
| 2026 | The Terminal List | Raife Hastings | Main role (season 2) |
