= Red Planet (film) =

2000 film by Antony Hoffman

- Theatrical release poster
- Directed by: Antony Hoffman
- Screenplay by: Chuck Pfarrer; Jonathan Lemkin
- Story by: Chuck Pfarrer
- Produced by: Mark Canton; Bruce Berman; Jorge Saralegui
- Starring: Val Kilmer; Carrie-Anne Moss; Tom Sizemore; Benjamin Bratt; Simon Baker; Terence Stamp
- Cinematography: Peter Suschitzky
- Edited by: Robert K. Lambert; Dallas Puett
- Music by: Graeme Revell
- Production companies: Warner Bros. Pictures; Village Roadshow Pictures; NPV Entertainment; The Mark Canton Company
- Distributed by: Warner Bros. Pictures (International); Roadshow Entertainment (Australia & New Zealand)
- Release dates: November 6, 2000 (Village Theater); November 10, 2000 (United States)
- Running time: 106 minutes
- Countries: United States; Australia
- Language: English
- Budget: $80 million
- Box office: $33.5 million

Red Planet is a 2000 science fiction action film directed by Antony Hoffman. The film stars Val Kilmer, Carrie-Anne Moss, and Tom Sizemore. The plot follows a team of astronauts who search for solutions to save a dying Earth by searching on Mars, only to have the mission go terribly awry.

Red Planet was released in the United States on 10 November 2000. The film was a critical failure and a box-office bomb, only grossing $33.5 million against the budget of $80 million and is Hoffman's only feature film to date. Red Planet was one of two films released in 2000 that depicted an expedition to Mars; the other was Mission to Mars, which was released eight months earlier.

== Plot ==
Due to the 21-century ecological crisis on Earth, for twenty years humankind has been terraforming Mars as its new home by sending algae to its surface. When oxygen levels begin decreasing, Mars-1 is sent to investigate, under Mission Commander Kate Bowman with a crew consisting of egotistical co-pilot Ted Santen, science officer Bud Chantilas, mechanical systems engineer Robby Gallagher, and two civilians: bioengineer Quinn Burchenal, and terraforming expert Chip Pettengill. Rule-breaking Gallagher is not Bowman's first choice, and while the crew nicknames him "space janitor," the two are drawn to each other.

A gamma-ray burst resulting from a massive solar flare damages the ship as it reaches Mars. Bowman launches the crew to the planet's surface, and manages to eject the flames of a ship-wide fire into the vacuum and restore power to communicate with Houston. She learns that Mars-1's orbit will decay in 31 hours, but that they can burn to return to Earth before that occurs. The landing craft tumbles to the wrong location, and AMEE, the military robot navigator, is jettisoned. Chantilas is mortally wounded and tells the others to leave without him to save oxygen.

The landing party finds no algae on the planet's surface, then discover that the HAB 1 has been destroyed, ensuring death when their spacesuit oxygen runs out. Pettengill follows Santen to the edge of a cliff, but when Santen mocks him, Pettingill strikes him, and he falls over the edge. Petengill then tells the others that Santen committed suicide. Gallagher decides to die quickly and opens his helmet, only to discover that Mars's atmosphere contains oxygen, more than the failed terraforming would have produced. Burchenal realizes they are near the Pathfinder rover, which will possibly have a working radio to contact Bowman. The trio set fire to the ruins of HAB 1 to warm them during the night.

AMEE rejoins the crew, but when they discuss shutting it down and taking its guidance device, it switches to a military protection mode, wounds Burchenal and leaves, intent on picking off the crew one at a time. When they reach the Rover, Gallagher is able to build a radio; Houston picks up their signal on a long-unused frequency and alerts Bowman. Bowman tells them to hike to Kosmos, a failed Russian probe 100 km away, and launch themselves by fitting into the rock sample container, but later tells Gallagher the space will hold only two passengers.

As they shelter in a cave from an ice storm, Gallagher tells the other two they'll be launching on Kosmos. Pettengill doesn't believe Gallagher will sacrifice himself. Meanwhile, Bowman receives orders from Houston that since it is unlikely the crew survived the ice storm, she is ordered to return home. Burchenal and Gallagher awaken to discover Pettengill has fled with the radio, then watch as he is chased and killed by AMEE. They recover the radio and find Pettengill's body in a patch of algae, full of Martian nematodes. Burchenal deduces that the nematodes have been eating the algae and excreting oxygen, and he captures a few in a sample vial as they could possibly save Earth. Drawn to Burchenal's wounds, the nematodes swarm him and start chewing through his suit. He tosses the vial to Gallagher and immolates himself. The burst, which consumes the algae patch and nematodes, is seen from Bowman on the Mars-1. She is able to contact an exhausted Gallagher and urges him to get to Kosmos.

Gallagher discovers the Russian probe's battery is dead, and right before the Mars-1 enters communication blackout he tells Bowman to leave. Gallagher then bids her goodbye when AMEE flies overhead and he realizes he could use AMEE's core as a power source. He lures and disables AMEE with one of the probe's sample launchers, removing AMEE's battery before it self-destructs, then launches himself into orbit. Bowman sees the Kosmos in the path of the Mars-1, aborts her departure and tethers out to retrieve and then revive Gallagher, who is in cardiac arrest. Later, as Bowman tells him that Earth now considers him a hero, she admits he's not who she thought he was, and they finally kiss. The film ends with her voiceover musing that on the six-month journey home, she'll get to know the janitor.

== Cast ==
- Val Kilmer as Robby Gallagher, Engineer
- Carrie-Anne Moss as Lieutenant Commander Kate Bowman, Mission Commander
- Tom Sizemore as Dr. Quinn Burchenal, Geneticist
- Benjamin Bratt as Lieutenant Ted Santen, Pilot
- Simon Baker as Dr. Chip Pettengill, Terraforming Specialist
- Terence Stamp as Dr. Bud Chantilas, Chief Science Officer
- Bob Neill as Houston (voice)

== Production ==
In July 1998, it was announced that South African commercial director Antony Hoffman was tapped to make his feature film directing debut with the science fiction thriller Alone for Village Roadshow Pictures and Warner Bros. Pictures. The story follows an astronaut stranded on Mars during the first manned expedition to the Red Planet. Mark Canton was set to produce the project based on a spec script by Chuck Pfarrer, who also served as executive producer. Village Roadshow head Bruce Berman acquired the script under a five-year co-financing and distribution deal with Warner Bros., with Basil Iwanyk supervising for the studio. The film carried an estimated budget in the $50 million range and eyed a fall production start in Australia. Prior to this project, Hoffman had directed notable commercials for Budweiser, Marlboro, and Nike, earning the 1997 Gold Lion at the Cannes Advertising Festival.

In September 1998, it was reported that the script was undergoing a rewrite by Jonathan Lemkin as part of Village Roadshow's internal development slate.

In May 1999, it was announced that Val Kilmer was finalizing a deal to star in which had been retitled Mars from Alone. Kilmer's agreement was reported as "95% finished," with a paycheck estimated between $6 million and $9 million. The project marked his return to Warner Bros. following strained relations after he exited Batman & Robin (1997). Filming was scheduled to begin on late August or early September start in Iceland and Australia. The Matrix executive producer Andrew Mason was also expected to join producers Canton and Jorge Saralegui. Signing Kilmer put Mars back into direct competition with Disney's rival project Mission to Mars, which was scheduled to begin filming in July for an early summer 2000 release. Carrie-Anne Moss was also tapped to star following her success with The Martix.

The production of the film (which was filmed in Wadi Rum in Southern Jordan and in Outback Australia) was the subject of numerous reports about the bad working relationship between co-stars Tom Sizemore and Val Kilmer. Kilmer's reputation for being "difficult" was already well-established, and although the two stars had been friends, they fell out after Kilmer reportedly became enraged when he discovered that production had paid for Sizemore's elliptical exercise machine to be shipped to the set. Kilmer shouted, "I’m making ten million on this; you’re only making two", to which Sizemore responded by throwing a 50-pound (23 kg) weight at Kilmer. The two were soon refusing to speak to each other or even come onto the set if the other was present, necessitating the use of body doubles to shoot scenes involving both actors, and their relationship became so bad that one of the producers is said to have asked Sizemore not to hit Kilmer in the face when the big fight finally happened – so Sizemore cooperated by punching Kilmer in the chest, hard enough to knock him down. Sizemore has since described the film as one of his career regrets, but also stated that he and Kilmer had since reconciled.

== Release ==
=== Box office ===
Red Planet opened at No. 5 at the North American box office behind Charlie's Angels, Little Nicky, Men of Honor and Meet the Parents, making $8.7 million USD in its opening weekend. The film made $33 million worldwide against an estimated budget of $80 million.

== Reception ==
Red Planet received negative reviews. The film holds a 14% approval rating on Rotten Tomatoes based on 102 reviews, with an average rating of 4.6/10. The site's consensus states: "While the special effects are impressive, the movie suffers from a lack of energy and interesting characters." On Metacritic, the film has a weighted average score of 34% based on reviews from 27 critics, indicating "generally unfavorable reviews". Audiences surveyed by CinemaScore gave the film a grade C on scale of A to F.

Stephen Holden's review in The New York Times was almost entirely negative, calling the film "a leaden, skimpily plotted space-age Outward Bound adventure with vague allegorical aspirations that remain entirely unrealized." Paul Tatara of CNN described it as "a hardware-based endurance test that looks spectacular and is only slightly more exciting than a nine-hour cricket match."

However, in his positive three thumbs up (of four) review, Roger Ebert said that he "like[s] its emphasis on situation and character" and that he's "always been fascinated by zero-sum plots in which a task has to be finished within the available supplies of time, fuel and oxygen". He notes that "like in 1950s sci-fi, the story's strong point isn't psychological depth or complex relationships, but brainy scientists trying to think their way out of a box that grows smaller every minute."

Filmink argued it was "One of several expensive flops that helped kill Kilmer's status as a movie star."

== Music ==
Red Planet: Music from the Original Motion Picture

Soundtrack album by Various artists
- Released: 2000
- Genres: Alternative rock; electronic rock; Industrial rock
- Length: 56:27
- Labels: PANGÆA; Interscope

The music for Red Planet was composed by Graeme Revell, Peter Gabriel, Sting, Kipper, Joe Frank, William Orbit, Rico Conning and Melissa Kaplan with performances from Graeme Revell, Peter Gabriel, Emma Shapplin, Sting, William Orbit, Melissa Kaplan and Different Gear vs. Police.

No.	Title	Writer(s)	Performer(s)	Length
1.	"The Tower That Ate People"	Peter Gabriel	Peter Gabriel	4:05
2.	"The Inferno"	Graeme Revell	Emma Shapplin	4:31
3.	"A Thousand Years"	Sting, Kipper	Sting	5:57
4.	"Mars Red Planet"	Revell	Graeme Revell	3:25
5.	"The Fifth Heaven"	Revell	Emma Shapplin	4:53
6.	"MontokPoint"	William Orbit, Rico Conning, Joe Frank	Strange Cargo	7:13
7.	"Canto XXX"	Revell	Emma Shapplin	5:11
8.	"Alone"	Revell	Graeme Revell	2:13
9.	"Dante's Eternal Flame"	Revell, Melissa Kaplan	Melissa Kaplan and Graeme Revell	3:40
10.	"Crash Landing"	Revell	Graeme Revell	5:13
11.	"The Tower That Ate People (Remix)"	Gabriel	Peter Gabriel	6:27
12.	"When The World Is Running Down (You Can't Go Wrong)"	Sting	Different Gear vs The Police	3:35
Total length:				56:27

== See also ==
- Mission to Mars, another film released in 2000
- Ghosts of Mars
- List of films set on Mars
- List of films featuring extraterrestrials
- Mars in fiction
