= Quidditism =

In metaphysics, quidditism is the perspective implied by the belief that nomological roles do not supervene on causal properties. Quidditism endorses the existence of quiddities (the existence of "whatness" of properties) and is typically characterized in opposition to causal essentialism.
