= Dread (film) =

- Promotional film poster
- Directed by: Anthony DiBlasi
- Written by: Anthony DiBlasi
- Based on: Dread by Clive Barker
- Produced by: Clive Barker; Lauri Apelian; Joe Daley; Jorge Saralegui; Nigel Thomas; Charlotte Walls
- Starring: Jackson Rathbone; Hanne Steen; Laura Donnelly; Jonathan Readwin; Shaun Evans
- Cinematography: Sam McCurdy
- Edited by: Celia Haining
- Music by: Theo Green
- Production companies: Midnight Picture Show; Matador Pictures
- Distributed by: After Dark Films (US only)
- Release dates: 14 July 2009 (Fantasia Film Festival); 30 August 2009 (United Kingdom)
- Running time: 108 minutes
- Country: United Kingdom
- Language: English

Dread is a 2009 British horror film directed and written by Anthony DiBlasi and starring Jackson Rathbone and Shaun Evans, loosely based on the short story of the same name by Clive Barker. The story was originally published in 1984 in volume two of Barker's Books of Blood short story collections. The movie introduces several characters and situations that did not exist in the story.

== Plot ==
At a small college, film major Stephen Grace meets fellow student Quaid, who reveals his plan to conduct a "fear study" as a school project, recording people as they talk about their greatest fears. Quaid, however, is mentally unstable and nearly obsessed with fear. Quaid had seen his parents killed by an axe murderer as a child; this is his greatest fear, and he wants to learn what others dread and how they deal with it in order to find a way to defy his own dread. Stephen's brother had died while drunk-driving, and Stephen wonders if his brother would still be alive if he had driven instead. To this day, Stephen refuses to drive, opting instead to take the bus.

The men recruit Stephen's friend Cheryl as the project's editor, and the first batch of interviews is conducted. Quaid quickly becomes dissatisfied with the results and picks a fight with Stephen by smashing the watch Stephen uses to time the bus schedule. Cheryl stops the argument by offering herself up to be interviewed, where she reveals that she was molested by her father as a child. He'd worked at a meat-packing plant and smelled of meat while molesting her; to this day, she cannot stand the smell of meat and refuses to eat it. This thrills Quaid, who says they are finally working with "honest-to-god trauma." He refuses to reveal his own traumas, but after having a nightmare while Stephen is in the house, he reveals the circumstances of his parents' deaths and the at-large status of their murderer.

Quaid purchases a car identical to the one Stephen's brother passed in, telling Stephen that driving it will help him to "face the beast" of his dread. Stephen is only mildly shaken and agrees to drive the car as catharsis. The same day, Quaid is excited at the discovery of Joshua, whose fear is becoming deaf again after he temporarily lost his hearing due to a childhood accident.

Abby, another student and a friend of Stephen's, has a dark birthmark covering half her face, and she offers to do an interview on her fear of being teased or shunned because of it. She does the interview only with Stephen, stripping to reveal that the birthmark also extends over half of her body, and attempts to kiss Stephen. He gently rejects her, having grown attracted to Cheryl, and she sends him away without his video equipment. Stephen tells Quaid he is ready to drive the car and uses it to take Cheryl on a date. Meanwhile, Quaid retrieves the equipment from Abby and tells her that she is attractive, and the two have sex. Additionally, Abby asks Quaid to paint a portrait of her without her birthmark.

A woman interviewed says she suffered from agoraphobia and had to be taken care of by her mother, with whom she formed a hateful yet dependent relationship. After her mother passed, she attempted suicide and legally died but was brought back to life. She claims she came back completely fearless, but Quaid, who has become increasingly unhinged throughout the film, becomes enraged and attacks her. During the attack, he reveals that her scar from slitting her throat is nothing more than prosthetic makeup. After she leaves, Stephen and Cheryl scold Quaid for his behavior and remind him that it is only a school project, which enrages him further and prompts him to destroy the group's equipment. Frightened, Cheryl flees and cuts off contact with both men, and after Quaid's verbal harassment, Stephen severs ties as well.

Cheryl later returns to the house to retrieve the last of her equipment and finds a room in Quaid's basement full of nude portraits of various women, all of which are depicted as mutilated and bloody. Quaid finds her there and expresses his desire to take the study to the next level. Meanwhile, Stephen discovers that Quaid has submitted the thesis despite its incompletion and later finds Quaid outside the school in his brother's car. Quaid pleads with Stephen for one last chance, saying he's made progress on the fear study. Once he has Stephen in the car, however, he begins speeding and drinking from a flask. He nearly crashes the car head-on into a wall, but Stephen stops him in time. Frightened and angry, Stephen flees the car and ignores Quaid's pleas for help.

Soon after, Quaid sets up video footage of Abby stripping naked in front of Stephen on every TV on campus, showing her naked and covered in birthmarks, along with video of him smearing his "normal" portrait of her in dark paint. Humiliated, Abby fills her bathtub with bleach and starts scrubbing off her skin with steel wool. Stephen finds her naked and bleeding and gets her to the hospital. Simultaneously, Quaid has lured Joshua back to the house and knocked him out, affixing a homemade device to Joshua's head meant to impair his hearing. Upon awakening, Joshua admits he is scared and asks to be released; Quaid replies by mocking Joshua and the device, then removes it and walks away. Rather than releasing Joshua, Quaid returns with a gun and fires it next to each of Joshua's ears, rendering him deaf once again. Quaid taunts Joshua as he writhes and leaves him outside a hospital. It is revealed to be the same hospital Abby is in, and Joshua sees Stephen walking down the hall. Stephen, enraged by Abby's misery and blaming Quaid, takes down a fire axe and leaves, unknowingly followed by Joshua, who assumes Stephen and Quaid are still working together.

Once at the house, Stephen chases Quaid into a bedroom and hacks at the door when Quaid shuts him out. Quaid emerges with his gun, forcing Stephen to the ground before knocking him out. Stephen awakens tied to a chair, and Quaid forces him to watch tapes he has made of Cheryl. Quaid has abducted her and locked her in a room with a slightly salted, well-cooked steak on a plate. The tapes show her rapid mental and physical decline. After about a week, she finally eats the entire piece of rotten beef. Quaid claims to have released her immediately after and says he is unaware of her whereabouts.

When the two men hear movement elsewhere in the house, Stephen is left alone and manages to break free. He gets a knife and creeps up behind Quaid, but Quaid realizes he is there and prepares to shoot him. Joshua, having picked up the discarded axe, runs between the two of them and fatally wounds Stephen. Quaid shoots and kills Joshua, hallucinating him to be his parents' murderer, and watches Stephen as he slowly dies from the axe wound. He then drags the body to a room in the basement where Cheryl is being kept. He throws Stephen's body in along with a switchblade and says, "Let's see how hungry you have to be to get through that." He leaves her crying with Stephen's dead body, and only a matter of time before she starts eating his flesh from hunger.

== Cast ==
- Jackson Rathbone as Stephen Grace
- Shaun Evans as Quaid
- Hanne Steen as Cheryl Fromm
- Laura Donnelly as Abby
- Jonathan Readwin as Joshua Shaw
- Carl McCrystal as Axe Man
- Paloma Faith as Clara Thornhill
- Derek Lea as Quaid's father
- Siobhan Hewlett as Quaid's mother

== Production ==
The 104 page script was shot in just 28 days. The paintings in the film were created by Nicole Balzarini.

== Release ==
The film had its world premiere at the 2009 Montreal Fantasia Festival, where it picked up a distributor in After Dark Films. It was announced that Dread would be included in the films in the fourth After Dark Horrorfest in 2010. The film was released on 29 January 2010 in US Cinemas.

== Reception ==
Allan Dart of Fangoria called it "a mixed but overall positive" adaptation of Barker's story. Scott Weinberg of Fearnet called it "a clever balancing act between basic scares, a creepy concept, and something a little more (dare I say) cerebral." Paul McCannibal of Dread Central rated it 4/5 stars and called it "a well made adaptation of the short story" that "is well worth your time." Dennis Harvey of Variety said that the film "intrigues, even if it doesn’t entirely satisfy". Noel Murray of The A.V. Club called it "overwritten and more than a little pretentious". Brett Cullum of DVD Verdict called it a good Barker adaptation that is "certainly worth checking out". Ian Jane of DVD Talk rated it 3.5/5 stars and called it "a nasty, twisted little thriller that features some good performances and stand out set pieces that help you look past its low budget."
