= Harry D'Amour =

- Harry D'Amour, as portrayed by actor Thomas Jane, on the cover art for Hellraiser #18 (September 2012).
- First appearance: The Last Illusion (1985)
- Created by: Clive Barker
- Portrayed by: Scott Bakula

In-universe information
- Gender: Male
- Occupation: Private detective
- Nationality: American

Harry D'Amour is a fictional occult detective created by author, filmmaker, and artist Clive Barker. He originally appeared in the short story The Last Illusion in Books of Blood Volume 6, an anthology written by Barker and published in 1985. D'Amour has appeared in other Clive Barker prose stories, as well as comic books published by Boom! Studios, and the 1995 film Lord of Illusions wherein the character is portrayed by actor Scott Bakula. Following this, the comic book adaptation of Barker's novel The Great and Secret Show depicts D'Amour as resembling Bakula. In 2012, the cover for Hellraiser #18 (published by Boom! Studios) used actor Thomas Jane as the model for D'Amour. In multiple stories, D'Amour is depicted as living in the same reality as Barker's popular creations the Cenobites and the Hell Priest (widely known to fans of the Hellraiser movie franchise as Pinhead).

D'Amour is a native of Hell's Kitchen in New York City. After serving as a police officer for years, he leaves that job to become a private investigator. After encountering demonic forces and fully accepting the existence of the supernatural, Harry studies occult texts and is mentored by Norma Paine, an elderly blind woman who can see ghosts and supernatural entities. He becomes widely known as an occult detective and expert in the supernatural. According to Clive Barker, D'Amour's destiny of repeatedly being pitted against evil forces is "karmic payback" for his own past sins. Due to his desire to protect not only the living but also any lost soul and spirit that suffers unjustly or is victimized, D'Amour describes himself as "a detective for the dead" in some stories. Though he regularly encounters violence, depravity, and moral compromise, D'Amour tries to uphold his own principles of morality.

Though he has a heightened awareness of supernatural forces and knowledge of the occult, Harry D'Amour does not generally practice magic or witchcraft and is usually depicted as having no direct magical abilities (except for some stories where he is granted supernatural power by others). During his investigations, D'Amour regularly carries a .38 revolver. Sigils and markers tattooed on D'Amour's body offer early warning of evil forces and some protection against magic.

== Character conception and development ==
In an interview with Fangoria, Clive Barker described Harry D'Amour as "this everyman who is drawn into the heart of darkness over and over again because of some karmic thing which he has no power over". In an interview with the Wired podcast The Geek's Guide to the Galaxy episode 151 (May 23, 2015), Barker said: "Harry is a film noir character in a way. He's a Philip Marlowe via Clive Barker. He's a down-at-the-heel, pissed-off, rather exhausted PI who's based in New York".

In the liner notes included with the director's cut of Lord of Illusions, Barker said: "I've travelled a long way with Harry D'Amour. He first appeared in a story I wrote almost a decade ago now, The Last Illusion. Since then, I've recounted his life and troubled times in two novels and some short fiction. I've not made the road very easy for him. His destiny, it seems, is to be in constant struggle with what might be loosely called 'the forces of darkness', though he claims he'd be quite content investigating insurance fraud. His reluctance is, I trust, part of his charm. He's not a Van Helsing, defiantly facing off against some implacable evil with faith and holy water. His antecedents are the troubled, weary and often lovelorn heroes of film noir - private detectives with an eye for a beautiful widow and an aversion to razors".

In an interview with Bloody Best of Fangoria in 1993, Clive Barker spoke of his story "The Last Illusion" and its movie adaptation Lord of Illusions: "I've always loved illusionists. There's always a dark side, and illusionists present them to you. It's very much life-and-death illusion - you sawed the woman in half, but she's still alive. They're presented as breezy, funny, entertaining pieces - but, subtextually, they're stories of death and resurrection".

While filming the adaptation Lord of Illusions, Barker considered actor Scott Bakula the perfect casting choice for Harry D'Amour. On the documentary "The Making of Lord of Illusions" included with the director's cut of the film, Barker said: "He's the Harry I've had in my head for 8 years - no word of a lie. When he stepped on set in costume for the first time, which happened to be into his apartment - the set for his apartment - I thought, 'This is wonderful - this is the man I've been writing about for 8 years'. And that's a real thrill to see an actor so beautifully embody somebody that you've been writing about for such a long time. It's a real thrill. I have to say, they used to say that thing on posters: 'So-and-so is so-and-so'. Well, Scott Bakula is Harry D'Amour, and it really sends a shiver down an author's back". Later in IDW Publishing's comic book adaptation of The Great and Secret Show, artist Gabriel Rodriguez designed D'Amour to look like Bakula. In the collected edition's afterword "The Great and Annotated Show", comic book scriptwriter Chris Ryall wrote "... there was only one way to portray D'Amour in the comics - namely, the same way he looked in the Lord of Illusions movie. This page garnered me more comments from fans than anything that occurred in any other issue. Everyone seemed very happy that D'Amour looked like he did".

== Fictional biography ==
=== Prose continuity ===
A native of New York City, Harry D'Amour is a police officer for some years before leaving the NYPD to become a private investigator. In the 1985 story The Last Illusion, Harry claims it took him "twenty years" to understand that murder can happen with any arbitrary motive and later says he hasn't prayed "in twenty years", but it is unclear if these two remarks are meant to be literal or are exaggerations.

The Last Illusion indicates D'Amour has little knowledge of the supernatural before he is hired by Lomax, a man who wishes evidence of his wife Mimi Lomax's adultery. The case leads D'Amour and a priest named Father Hesse to the Lomax house on Wyckoff Street in Brooklyn, NY. D'Amour and Father Hesse confront Mimi's lover, who reveals himself to be a demon. A battle ensues, resulting in multiple deaths and Mimi being lost to the "Gulfs" (a term some of Clive Barker's demons use to refer to Hell). Harry is traumatized by the case, developing a fear of stairs and no longer sure how he can remain safe if supernatural forces are real.

According to the 2015 novel The Scarlet Gospels, the Lomax case convinced Harry supernatural forces were real and not hallucination but was not his first encounter with a demon. The novel revises Harry's history, saying he had a few encounters with magic as a child, never understanding the truth of these incidents and "secret terrors" and forcing himself to forget and deny they occurred. According to the novel, D'Amour's first conscious realization of the supernatural occurs when he is a police officer and accidentally discovers a demon alongside his partner Sam "Scummy" Schomberg. The demon murders Schomberg and sexually assaults D'Amour before leaving. The trauma of this night leads D'Amour to leave the police force and become a private investigator. The Scarlet Gospels also focuses on his relationship with elderly blind medium Norma Paine, who D'Amour meets after coming to terms with the existence of the supernatural. Norma teaches D'Amour many things about occult magic and entities. D'Amour also meets tattoo artist Caz King who then put sigils on the detective's body to alert him to and/or protect him from supernatural threats.

Since Harry has no protective tattoos in his original story The Last Illusion and seems largely ignorant of the nature of magic and demons, the story must retroactively take place in-between his departure from the NYPD and the time he meets Caz King.

The Last Illusion states that Harry D'Amour was married for a time but then divorced by his late twenties. It is not clear if the divorce occurred during his time with the NYPD or after he left.

==== The Last Illusion ====
In the short story The Last Illusion in Books of Blood Volume 6, Harry D'Amour is introduced as a man in his thirties, a divorced private investigator living in New York City. His recent case at the Lomax house on Wyckoff Street in Brooklyn has shaken his views of the world and himself, as he now knows for certain that magic and demonic forces are real. The case also leaves Harry with a fear of stairs for some time.

A famous illusionist named Swann is killed. His wife Dorothea Swann learns of Harry D'Amour from news coverage of the Lomax case in Brooklyn. She hires D'Amour to protect Swann's body while she makes arrangements for cremation, believing her husband's enemies might interfere. D'Amour learns demons want to claim Swann's soul because years ago he made a deal with them, gaining real magic that he then used to become famous while pretending to only be a stage illusionist. Swann's attorney Butterfield convinces Dorothea to release D'Amour from employment. After speaking with Swann's aid Valentin, Harry decides to continue protecting Swann's body regardless of Dorothea's decision. After avoiding and then battling demons, D'Amour succeeds in cremating the magician's body before the demons can take the man's soul. Butterfield, revealed to be a demon, declares Hell won't forget or forgive Harry's actions and that they are enemies from now on. D'Amour answers, "I hope so". Following this, D'Amour regains confidence and decides to prepare for future encounters with the supernatural.

==== Lost Souls ====
Harry D'Amour next appears in the short story Lost Souls, first printed in a 1985 issue of Time Out Magazine. Set near Christmas time, this story depicts the start of his relationship with Norma Paine, a blind old woman with an inner eye granting her the ability to see beings of the spirit world across great distances. It is also established that D'Amour has now faced the demons of the Gulf frequently. With her sight, Paine assists D'Amour in his hunt for the elusive demon Cha'Chat. Upon cornering the demon, it redirects him to "something wilder", another demon about to be born, before using the distraction to escape. D'Amour also meets Darrieux Marchetti, also known as the Cankerist, a theological assassin who seems to have a vague history with the detective. Marchetti banishes the demon before it can be born and D'Amour returns to Paine's apartment, awaiting his next encounter with Hell.

==== Books of the Art ====
Harry D'Amour appears in Barker's Books of the Art trilogy of novels. In the first book, the 1989 novel The Great and Secret Show, he plays a small role. He returns as a major character in the second installment, the 1994 novel Everville. The third book has yet to be published.

In The Great and Secret Show, D'Amour offers his advice and knowledge to the protagonists regarding invaders from across the "dream-sea" known as Quiddity where all humans are said to travel metaphysically three times in their lives: when they are born, when they fall in love for the first time, and when they die. At this point, D'Amour is now regarded as an expert on matters of magic; when questioned on his knowledge, he alludes to his contacts who are "plugged in" regarding the supernatural, including Norma Paine. The first to contact the detective is Jim Hotchkiss, father of Carolyn, a victim of rape at the hands of spiritually transformed rivals Richard Fletcher and Randolph Jaffe who make war with each other over control of Quiddity's power.

The second to contact him is screenwriter Tesla Bombeck, gifted near death with shamanic abilities after being touched by the same supernatural substance that transformed Jaffe and Fletcher, known as Nuncio. At the end of the story, he visits lovers Jo-Beth McGuire and Howard Katz, the last two surviving children of the Nunciate rivals. He advises them, as all those affected by the lengthy destructive battle between Fletcher and Jaffe, to prepare for the coming invasion of the Cosm (Earth) from the Metacosm (the ethereal far side of Quiddity) by the enigmatic maddening darkness bent on enslaving humankind known as Iad Uroboros; his encounters with the demons of the Gulf have taught him much of similar unseen threats to the world and their agents on Earth.

The Great and Secret Show was adapted by IDW Publishing as a 12-part comic book series published between March 2006 and May 2007. The story was adapted by writer Chris Ryall and artist Gabriel Rodriguez. In the collected edition, writer Chris Ryall confirmed the comic's design for Harry D'Amour was meant to resemble actor Scott Bakula.

==== The Scarlet Gospels ====
Clive Barker's 2015 novel The Scarlet Gospels acts as a sequel to his 1986 novella The Hellbound Heart, which introduced the Cenobites, demonic figures of Hell that obsessively pursue practicing torture and sadism on human souls. The leader of the Cenobites is the entity known as the Hell Priest (also called "Pinhead", a nickname he abhors). While The Scarlet Gospels acknowledges Harry's prose adventures, it does not make reference to (and actively contradicts) his experiences the Boom! Studios comics timeline. Likewise, it only follows the Cenobite mythology established in Barker's prose work and does not acknowledge the canon of the Hellraiser film franchise or its tie-in comics. In the novel, D'Amour is now 47 years old (the text states that twenty-four years have passed since he was 23 years old).

The Cenobite known as the Hell Priest spends several years killing nearly every true magician active on Earth, stealing their great spells and talismans. Satisfied, he now intends to find Lucifer, who abandoned his post in Hell long ago, in order to attain even greater knowledge and power. Seeing Harry D'Amour as a possible obstacle, the Hell Priest lures the detective to a lethal trap in New Orleans. After D'Amour survives the encounter, the Hell Priest is impressed and concludes the detective should witness his rise to power. The Cenobite takes Norma Paine as a hostage, motivating Harry to pursue them into Hell. D'Amour is joined by the Harrowers, his group of friends dedicated to fighting supernatural forces.

By the end of the novel, Norma is killed, Lucifer destroys Hell, and the Hell Priest dies in it. Harry D'Amour returns to Earth, blinded by the Hell Priest and falling into depression. Norma, now a ghost, visits D'Amour to comfort him. He has inherited Norma's ability to see and speak with the dead. This ability nearly overwhelms D'Amour at first. After perceiving the spirits of a child and his aunt, D'Amour promises to help them and embarks on a new stage of his life.

==== Sherlock Holmes and the Servants of Hell ====
The 2016 novel Sherlock Holmes and the Servants of Hell, written by Paul Kane, features Sherlock Holmes encountering the Cenobites. The story takes place in the late 19th century. Neither Pinhead nor Harry D'Amour appear in it. However, the story does feature a man named Henri D'Amour, implied to be an ancestor of Harry.

=== Boom! Studios comics continuity ===
Harry D'Amour plays a major role in the Boom! Studios comic book series Hellraiser that was published from 2011-12. These comic books follow the canon of the first three Hellraiser films rather than the prose stories of Clive Barker. The comic series features Pinhead and the Cenobites. In the mythology of the Hellraiser film franchise and the Boom! Studios comics, the Cenobites answer to a demonic deity called Leviathan and occupy a Hell dimension that resembles a labyrinth and is dedicated to those sinners motivated by the pursuit of pleasure above all else. In this canon, Pinhead was originally Elliott Spencer, a human native to England who joined the Cenobites after his experiences as a soldier during World War I, becoming their "Hell Priest" or "Pontifex".

In the comic book series, the Hell Priest escapes Hell and reclaims his humanity, becoming Elliot Spencer once again while leaving behind his old enemy Kirsty Cotton to take his place as the new "Priestess" of the Cenobites. Harry D'Amour becomes aware of Spencer's presence on Earth and sends a scout named Theo to work with the Harrowers, a group of people dedicated to fighting the Cenobites who first appeared in Hellraiser tie-in comics published in the 1990s by Marvel Comics. D'Amour also contacts Tiffany, Kirsty's surrogate daughter and frequent enemy to the Hell Priest, and encourages her to join the Harrowers, whom he works with at times. Eventually, Spencer allies with another demon lord and acquires new power, then begins a quest to take over Earth and replace Leviathan, the lord of the Cenobites. D'Amour finally appears in Hellraiser issue #14 (2012). The series shows the US government acknowledging D'Amour as a trusted authority on the supernatural. D'Amour works with the military, a Cenobite, and Kirsty to defeat Spencer's attempt at conquering Earth and gaining god-like power. The story ends with both Kirsty and the Hell Priest imprisoned, and Harry being warned that someone must take their place, since there must always be a Hell Priest.

The 2013 Boom! Studios follow-up comic book series Hellraiser: The Dark Watch, plotted and co-written by Barker, picks up a year after the Hell Priest's defeat. It is revealed that Harry D'Amour became the new Hell Priest in Pinhead's wake and now physically resembles him. Unlike most Cenobites, D'Amour is allowed to retain his personality and memories, and so he attempts to learn more about Leviathan's true plans in order to stop them. He also continues to carry his gun, useful in harming enemies invulnerable to magic and demonic attack. During his time as a Cenobite, Harry considers that Butterfield and other demons he met before were very different in nature and motivation to the Cenobites, who were not born demons but are human converts. D'Amour later confirms there are various realms of Hell, each of which has a different demonic ruler and focuses on different forms of sin. While the Cenobites occupy Leviathan's labyrinth and target sinner who pursued pleasure, a dimension ruled by the demon Abaddon is populated largely by pure-bred demons who target sinners motivated by fury.

Tiffany frees Kirsty and Spencer from imprisonment. Spencer joins with Abaddon's army, once again attempting to achieve greater power at the cost of Earth. Kirsty and Tiffany, both now Cenobites, join with D'Amour's forces against Spencer. After a battle, Leviathan offers Kirsty and Spencer bargains in order to prevent the conflict from continuing. Spencer agrees to become the Hell Priest again, but now with greater power and authority. Leviathan then resurrect's Kirsty's dead love Edgar and restores her, Tiffany, and Harry D'Amour to their original, human forms. The Hell Priest then demonstrates his restored power by killing Edgar before returning to Hell. Kirsty, Tiffany, and Harry D'Amour are left on Earth, alive and restored but knowing the Hell Priest and the Cenobites are still a threat.

== Films ==
D'Amour was portrayed by actor Scott Bakula in the 1995 film Lord of Illusions, directed and written by Clive Barker and loosely based on his short story "The Last Illusion". In the film, Harry is a divorced private investigator. He is already known as an occult investigator and has protective tattoos on his body. After a case in Brooklyn involving a child's exorcism makes the news, he leaves New York City and accepts a job in Los Angeles. His client Dorothea Swann explains her husband, illusionist Philip Swann, has become disturbed by a tarot reading and asks Harry to investigate the truth behind this fear and whether or not there is a real threat.

D'Amour attends Philip Swann's next performance and witnesses the magician die on stage during his performance. Investigating further, he learns that Swann and other allies were once part of a cult led by the demonically empowered man called Nix. Swann and his former allies turned against Nix, but now years later they are being killed by Nix's loyal follower, a man named Butterfield. D'Amour then joins forces with Dorothea to thwart the plans set into motion by Nix and Butterfield. D'Amour and Dorothea become romantically involved during the film's events.
