= The Great and Secret Show =

Novel by Clive Barker

- Cover of first UK edition
- Author: Clive Barker
- Cover artist: Sanjulian
- Language: English
- Series: The Art Trilogy
- Genre: Fantasy
- Publisher: Collins
- Publication date: January 1990
- Publication place: United Kingdom
- Media type: Print (hardback)
- ISBN: 0-06-016276-7
- OCLC: 20669762
- Dewey Decimal: 823/.914 20
- LC Class: PR6052.A6475 G7 1989
- Followed by: Everville

The Great and Secret Show is a fantasy novel by English author Clive Barker. It was released in 1989 and it is the first "Book of the Art" in a planned trilogy, known as "The Art Trilogy" by fans. It is followed by Everville (1994).

The novel is about the conflict between two highly evolved men – Randolph Jaffe and Richard Fletcher – over the mystical dream sea called Quiddity. Jaffe hopes to tap into Quiddity's power while Fletcher wants to prevent it from being tainted. The conflict between the two men spills into the real world in a decades-long feud, distorting reality and affecting the entire human race.

Clive Barker has said in interviews that this novel was the hardest to write of all his books.

== Background ==
Barker has stated that the idea for the novel came to him from the discovery of "a little town in Ventura County just outside Los Angeles". In a 1990 interview with the Boston Herald he says: "Sometimes an image comes along which is so perfect you absolutely have to have it: who could possibly improve on the symbolic significance of a perfect little town - the lawns all evenly mowed, everything working like clockwork - constructed on a fault line?"

== Plot summary ==
In 1969, while working in a dead letter office in Nebraska, disgruntled postal clerk Randolph Jaffe discovers hints to a mysterious society known as The Shoal, which ostensibly practises a form of magic only vaguely known as "The Art". Jaffe's search eventually brings him to a New Mexico town where he encounters Kissoon, who claims to be the last of the Shoal. Kissoon tells Jaffe of the mystical dream sea Quiddity and the islands within it known as the Ephemeris. Quiddity, as it turns out, is visible exactly three times to an ordinary human: The first time we ever sleep outside our mother's womb, the first time we sleep beside the one we truly love and the last time we ever sleep before we die. However, this simply is not enough for the megalomaniac Jaffe, who wishes to actually visit the dream sea in person and gain control of it. Jaffe flees when Kissoon tries to bargain for his body.

Jaffe later teams up with a scientist named Fletcher to develop a liquid called Nuncio, which can theoretically allow a human to evolve to a state that would enable him to physically reach Quiddity. Fletcher realises that Jaffe will only use Nuncio for evil and destroys his laboratory. Jaffe arrives and both are exposed to the Nuncio. After the two battle each other for a year, their spirits arrive in California and topple into a crack in the earth near the town of Palomo Grove. From there, they energise extreme sexual desires into four local teenage girls. The four girls seek out various partners in their community and become impregnated. One of the girls is infertile and fails to conceive while another kills herself and her child after giving birth. The third, Trudi Katz, moves away with her baby Howard, while the fourth, Joyce McGuire, gives birth to twins, Jo-Beth and Tommy Ray.

Eighteen years pass. Howard returns to California after the death of his mother. While Jaffe and Fletcher produced offspring to continue their battle, Howard and Jo-Beth instead fall in love after meeting. Fletcher and Jaffe are able to escape their captivity, locked into the crack in the earth. Jaffe is able to amass an army of creatures known as Terata using the minds of vulnerable people, and gets his son Tommy Ray on his side as well. Howard encounters Fletcher, who explains his heritage to him. Fletcher explains Quiddity to Howard, telling him that the Ephemeris contain the Great and Secret Show, but Howard refuses to align with his father. Meanwhile, a reporter named Grillo and his friend, Tesla, arrive in town. Fletcher is unable to amass his own army of hallucigenia from the mind of dreamers and instead kills himself through immolation, spreading his essence to the people of the town.

Having encountered Fletcher before his death, Tesla heads to the remnants of his laboratory to recover the remains of the Nuncio. Tommy Ray is sent by Jaffe. While there Tesla encounters Raul, an ape who had been evolved through the power of the Nuncio. Tommy Ray arrives and shoots Tesla, but the last remaining vial of Nuncio breaks, infecting both of them. Tesla's consciousness travels to a time loop in New Mexico where she encounters Kissoon. Kissoon explains to Tesla that the Shoal were dedicated to keeping Quiddity and the Art pure but with them all dead, Earth (known as the Cosm) could be dominated by the evil race Iad Uroboros, who live in the Metacosm on the opposite side of Quiddity. Tesla leaves when Kissoon tries to take over her body but agrees to find another body for him to inhabit. Leaving the time loop, Tesla encounters a woman named Mary Muralles, who reveals that it was Kissoon who murdered the Shoal and he is actually an agent of the Iad Uroboros. Kissoon kills Mary using snake-like creatures created by his excrement and semen (Lix), then captures Raul to take over his body.

Tommy Ray leads an army of the dead while the hallucigenia created by Fletcher's death convince Howard to help them attack Jaffe. Jaffe manages to tear a hole through reality into Quiddity but realises it is too much power for him to deal with. As his Terata battle the hallucigenia, many are dragged into Quiddity including Howard, Jo-Beth and Tommy Ray. Tesla, Grillo and Jaffe flee the house and attempt to close the vortex into Quiddity. Quiddity transforms Howard, Jo-Beth and Tommy Ray as they reach the Ephemeris, where they find that the Iad Uroboros are crossing Quiddity towards Earth.

The town starts to collapse and is sealed off by the authorities. Tesla recalls a word Kissoon had brought up, "Trinity", which is the place where the first atomic bomb was detonated. Kissoon arrives, now occupying Raul's body, but Jaffe is able to distract him as Tesla transports the vortex to Quiddity into Kissoon's time loop. Howard, Jo-Beth and Tommy Ray, completely transformed from their experience in Quiddity, return from the vortex. Jaffe is able to kill Raul's body and is reunited with Tommy Ray. Tesla finds that Raul has occupied Kissoon's former body. By convincing Raul's consciousness to enter her body, Kissoon's body dies, which disintegrates the time loop, destroys the vortex to Quiddity and the Iad Uroboros who were arriving. Tesla and the others are able to escape the time loop just in time.

Jo-Beth and Howard meet supernatural investigator Harry D'Amour, who asks for their story. Tesla meets Grillo and tells him that the worshippers of the Iad Uroboros are still active and will try to summon them again.

== Themes ==
Principal themes include: good vs. evil in America; dreams; "movies, pornography and love." A 1989 interview in Publishing News quotes Barker as saying: "Succinctly put, it's about Hollywood, sex and Armageddon."

== Adaptations ==
=== Comics ===
It was also released as a 12-part comic book between March 2006 and May 2007 by IDW Publishing.

=== Television ===
In December 2016, filmmaker Josh Boone announced that he is adapting the novel as a television series with co-writer Owen King.

== Reception ==
Critical reception for the book has been mixed. Ken Tucker of The New York Times wrote: "From The Great and Secret Show, it is clear that Mr. Barker's intention is to force the horror genre to encompass a kind of dread, an existential despair, that it hasn't noticeably evinced until now. This is a tall order, one that this novel, which is skillful and funny but ultimately overwrought, doesn't quite accomplish. But, having announced the intention of writing a trilogy about the Art and its mysteries, he may yet achieve his goal". Author David Foster Wallace criticised the work as "pretentious beyond belief", but commented that the novel was "not without some cool sections". Publishers Weekly criticised the work overall, stating: "Though diverting, the novel is something of a potboiler, and despite its pervasive horrific imagery, it fails even to frighten us--or invite us to suspend disbelief", though Kirkus Reviews called it: one of the most powerful overtly metaphysical novels of recent years."
