= Justin Lassen =

- Also known as: DDH (Digital Dirt Heads), EMT (Empire of Modern Thought), Omnicron, Innerplaid
- Born: Justin L Lassen; August 27, 1981; Denver, Colorado
- Origin: Denver, Colorado
- Died: February 22, 2021 (aged 39)
- Genres: Electronic music, romantic music, dirtwave, hard rock, pop, classical, IDM
- Occupations: Record producer, composer, musician, songwriter, remixer
- Instruments: Guitar, bass, drums, orchestral strings, vocals, synthesizer, electronics, laptop, softsynth, drum machine, computer, sampler, piano
- Years active: 1994–2021
- Label: Nihil Records

Justin Lassen (born August 27, 1981, in Denver, Colorado) was a composer, producer, multi-instrumentalist and remixer who has worked in the film, sound design, and video game industries. He died on February 22, 2021, of apparent natural causes.

== Early work ==
One of Lassen's earliest forays into the (public) musical world was Omnicron—an electronica project. It started in November 1996 after Lassen got his first Yamaha keyboard. He released 11 full-length albums through the old MP3.com over the course of Omnicron's existence. Lassen created Digital Dirt Heads, an industrial rock project, in 1999. Lassen released a Digital Dirt Heads track "The Human Condition" on the Midnight Meat Train soundtrack, produced and remixed by Lassen, which was released July 22, 2008, through Lakeshore Records.

== Remixes ==
Justin Lassen has produced several remixes under the moniker "Empire of Modern Thought", including Madonna, Lady Gaga, Garbage, Blue Man Group, Fisher, Lenny Kravitz, Robert Miles, Nine Inch Nails, Linkin Park, Evanescence, The Killers, Avril Lavigne and many others.

== And Now We See But Through a Glass Darkly ==
In 2003, Lassen released his dark chamber symphonic suite "And Now We See But Through a Glass Darkly". Since 2003, this dark chamber symphonic suite has racked up over 100 million downloads. Lassen released a limited edition physical CD release for this work, featuring premium packaging and remastered tracks.

== Synaesthesia ==
Lassen released Synaesthesia—musical tracks he composed that were inspired by the work of several CG artists—in 2006. Since then, the project has gained such popularity that he has done four different synaesthesia releases in all. Lassen released Synaesthesia as a physical CD release, completely remastered, in 2010.

== White Rabbit Asylum ==
In 2010, Lassen compiled "White Rabbit Asylum," which was released from Sony. This selection of 24 bit audio sound clips is still considered one of the best (and only) horror sound libraries of all time.

== Soundtracks ==
In 2008, Lakeshore Records requested Lassen to do an "inspired by" soundtrack to Clive Barker's Midnight Meat Train. It features 14 tracks produced and remixed by Lassen. One review exclaimed, "These remixes are all stellar."

In 2011, Lakeshore Records asked Lassen to do music and remixes for both the soundtrack and score to Underworld: Awakening (2012). Soundtrack features 17 tracks. Lassen's remix, featuring Silent Fury, has been hailed as one of the "best songs" on the CD by at least one reviewer.

In 2013, Lassen mixed another "inspired by" soundtrack to I, Frankenstein, including an original song "Feed Me More."

== Video Game Audio ==
In 2009, Lassen composed the soundtrack for Out of Hell, a high quality total conversion mod based on Unreal Tournament 2004. The game's creator, Long Nguyen, called the soundtrack, "really melancholy [with] somber undertones and you can’t help but feel the desolation in it."
