= Everville =

Novel by Clive Barker

- First US edition
- Author: Clive Barker
- Language: English
- Series: Books of the Art
- Genre: Fantasy
- Publisher: HarperCollins
- Publication date: 27 October 1994
- Publication place: United Kingdom
- Media type: Print (hardback)
- Pages: 697
- ISBN: 0-06-017798-5
- Preceded by: The Great and Secret Show

Everville is a 1994 fantasy novel by British author Clive Barker. The second in the Books of the Art series, it follows the 1989 novel The Great and Secret Show.

The story tells of the creation and transformation of the small town of Everville, including several characters from Quiddity, the vast universe or afterlife hinted previously in the series. Detective Harry D'Amour appears, as do the 'Shu (small, squid-like beings described as "pieces of God"), Phoebe Cobb, a resident of the town who passionately loves Joe, a dark-skinned painter, and Seth, a gay teenager who can hear angels knocking from the other side of Heaven.

== Plot summary ==
In 1848, an Irish immigrant named Maeve O'Connell is traveling west with her father and a group of others. Her father seeks to found the town of Everville, being inspired by a mysterious man named Buddenbaum and having been given a medallion similar to the one possessed by Jaffe in the Great and Secret Show. Maeve's father is scapegoated and murdered by the fanatics in the group but Maeve is saved by a winged creature named Coker. Disobeying his orders to not follow him, Maeve ends up disrupting a wedding ceremony of two warring families from Quiddity, leading to a large conflict and the death of most of the families. Coker and Maeve are about to head through a portal, called a neirica, which brought such beings to Earth from Quiddity, but the arrival of Buddenbaum disrupts things. As the neirica closes, Coker severs his wings to stay with Maeve. Only one of the beings from Quiddity remains, a creature named Noah.

The narrative then shifts to the present day, where Everville is about to hold its popular annual festival. A doctor's receptionist named Phoebe Cobb carried on an affair with a black painter named Joe Flicker. When caught by Phoebe's husband, a struggle ensues and her husband is accidentally killed, forcing Joe, who has a prior criminal record, to go on the run. Tesla Bombeck, whose head is also occupied by Raul, returns to Palomo Grove where she meets a young man named Lucien and his colleagues, who believe Fletcher has returned. Meanwhile, Grillo, who has been collecting strange stories from around the world in a database he calls "The Reef" comes across a report that makes him believe Tommy Ray is still alive. He reaches out to Howard and Jo-Beth, who are now married with a baby daughter, Amy. An attorney named Erwin Toothaker comes across a 30-year-old confession about the lynching of a strange family of three. His research leads him to the remains of the family's home where he finds Fletcher. Tesla meets up with and has sex with Lucien but the two argue and split up, spurned primarily by Raul. Fletcher drains the life out of Erwin, killing him. Erwin's spirit remains and sees him creating Lix, revealing that Fletcher is in fact Kissoon. Joe, fleeing to the hills near Everville, comes across Noah and the still present neirica to Quiddity. Noah convinces Joe to bring him through into Quiddity and promises him power. He introduces Joe to a squid-like creature called Zehraphushu ("Shu") which is believed to be a god-like being possessing a hive mind. Erwin's spirit is able to lead Tesla to his home where she meets and befriends Phoebe.

Buddenbaum returns to Everville and starts a relationship with local teenager Seth Lundy. Buddenbaum has brought spirits he calls avatars with him and is looking for what he calls the crossroads. Tesla and Phoebe return to Erwin's house where they encounter Kissoon. Due to the arrival of Erwin and other spirits, as well as Kissoon's weakened state, Tesla and Phoebe are able to escape. In a dream Phoebe is able to interact with Joe, but he is left for dead in the water by the enslaved beings on the ship he is traveling on. In New York, Harry D'Amour meets with his friend Ted, who has made a painting of Wyckoff Street, where years earlier D'Amour encountered a demon he calls Lazy Susan who killed a friend of his. With support from Ted and his psychic friend Norma, D'Amour infiltrates a ceremony of beings from Quiddity, but Kissoon arrives in a new body, killing them and sealing the neirica. D'Amour finds an old abode of Kissoon's and pursues him across the country, eventually being led to Everville.

Tesla and Phoebe head to the mountains of Everville where they find some creatures from Quiddity and the bodies of Lucien and his colleagues, who have been crucified. By threatening one of the creatures, and due to the timely arrival of D'Amour, they are able to escape. Tesla and Phoebe split up as Phoebe heads through the neirica into Quiddity. Due to the close proximity to Quiddity, Raul's spirit departs Tesla's body. In Quiddity, Phoebe meets a creature named Musnakaff who brings her to a home in the recreated city of Liverpool where she meets the now elderly Maeve O'Connell. Meanwhile, Joe makes it to the island of Mem-e b'Kether Sabbat where he finds many fleeing the city in fear of the Iad Ourobourus who are continuing to make their way across Quiddity to the Earth. Buddenbaum and Seth reunite. As the annual parade takes place in Everville, Buddenbaum tries to dig up the medallion buried in the ground and starts using the Art, causing many strange things to happen. A girl, one of Buddenbaum's avatars known as the jai wai, appears to Tesla, and are interested in her. D'Amour shoots Buddenbaum in the head which doesn't kill him, but he stops his attempts at using the Art.

Speaking with Maeve, Phoebe learns that she, along with her husband Coker and child, were the three that were lynched many years ago as discovered by Erwin. Maeve wants to return to Everville and along the way her former lover, a being made of earth called King Texas, appears. Maeve refuses him but Phoebe falls in a chasm and is forced to remain with him. Joe reunites with Noah, who leads him to a temple where there is a giant Shu, the only thing holding back the Iad Ouroborus. Joe has a special bond with the Shu, but Noah wants him to kill it. When he refuses, he kills Joe then the giant Shu as well. Joe's spirit departs his body and witnesses the Iad now heading across Quiddity. Grillo helps Howard and Jo-Beth flee from Tommy Ray, but he pursues them along with the numerous dead spirits that follow him which he is unable to control. In the attempt to stop Tommy Ray, Howard starts a fire, but this ends up claiming the life of both him and Jo-Beth. Grillo is also killed trying to save Amy, who he gives to Tesla. Tesla meets all of the jai wai. Meanwhile, Erwin meets the spirit of Coker and they follow D'Amour to the mountains. There D'Amour is captured by the same creatures from Quiddity that Tesla and Phoebe had encountered before. Kissoon reveals himself to D'Amour and says that he has sealed the neirica across the world such that the Iad would enter Earth via Everville. Raul, who has possessed the body of one of the creatures from Quiddity is able to free D'Amour.

Phoebe is able to free herself of King Texas, who is able to block a large portion of the Iad from heading through the neirica to Earth. However, a portion of the Iad still head through. Maeve meets D'Amour and Raul. She reveals to them the origins of Everville, that the town was founded through prostitution she had set up there, and of her husband Coker and son Clayton, who showed utter contempt for humanity. Hearing of him, D'Amour recognizes Clayton to be Kissoon, who is seeking revenge upon Everville. Seth reaches out to Tesla, trying to set up a meeting with her and Buddenbaum. The jai wai have decided to abandon Buddenbaum for Tesla and she meets with him. Her being there disrupted Buddenbaum's previous attempt to use the Art and she agrees to bring the jai wai to him and leave him be. Tommy Ray arrives in Everville and is able to take Amy, whom he claims to be his daughter, away with him. Tesla meets with the jai wai and agrees to let them follow her, but wants them to tell Buddenbaum they are abandoning him. Buddenbaum, who is again attempting to use the Art, reacts to the news by causing a blaze in the area, killing Tesla and the jai wai. Light from the event envelops Maeve, causing her original whorehouse to appear again. D'Amour looks for and finds Kissoon, and Seth helps him escape from Buddenbaum. Kissoon confronts his mother in the whorehouse and kills her, but by doing so Tesla is resurrected and given the power of the Art. Maeve's spirit is reunited with that of Coker's. Kissoon and the Iad fade away into the darkness.

Time passes and the events in Everville hit the news. Buddenbaum, Seth, Kissoon and the Iad have all disappeared. Tesla heads to Omaha to see the Reef. Harry has one final confrontation with the Lazy Susan demon and kills him. He is summoned by Raul to come see Tesla, finding her in a non-responsive state. Despite her state, Tesla is able to show D'Amour visions of the stories gathered in the Reef and is looking for the origins of everything. In Quiddity, Phoebe returns to Maeve's home. The spirit of Joe reaches the house where he partially comes into being while she is dreaming of him. Phoebe later is reunited with Joe by the shore, with the remains of his new body being created by the Shu.

== Reception ==
Critical reception for Everville has been mixed. The Sun-Sentinel panned Everville as inconsistent and stated that they felt that like its predecessor, it contained too many characters and that "when you weed out the subplots, you find there is no main plot".

In contrast outlets like the Orlando Sentinel and Publishers Weekly praised the work. The latter wrote: "At times profoundly moving as flawed heroes and heroines martyr themselves to love or goodness, this novel confirms the author's position not only as one of horror's most potent and fertile minds but also as one of modern fiction's premier metaphysicians".
