= Hotel Room =

1993 television film

- Hotel Room poster
- Also known as: David Lynch's Hotel Room
- Created by: Monty Montgomery; David Lynch
- Written by: Barry Gifford; Jay McInerney
- Directed by: David Lynch; James Signorelli
- Starring: Glenne Headly; Freddie Jones; Harry Dean Stanton; Griffin Dunne; Deborah Unger; Mariska Hargitay; Chelsea Field; Crispin Glover; Alicia Witt
- Composer: Angelo Badalamenti
- Country of origin: United States
- Original language: English
- No. of seasons: 1
- No. of episodes: 3

Production
- Executive producers: Monty Montgomery; David Lynch
- Producer: Deepak Nayar
- Cinematography: Peter Deming
- Editors: Mary Sweeney; David Siegel; Toni Morgan
- Running time: 27, 25, 47 minutes
- Production companies: Asymmetrical Productions; Propaganda Films

Original release
- Network: HBO
- Release: January 8, 1993

Hotel Room (sometimes referred to as David Lynch's Hotel Room) is an American drama anthology series that aired for three episodes on HBO on January 8, 1993, with a rerun the next night. Created by Monty Montgomery and David Lynch (who directed the first and third episodes), each episode stars a different cast and takes place in the same room of a New York City hotel, in the years 1969, 1992, and 1936, respectively. The three episodes (totaling 99 minutes) were intended to be shown together in the form of a feature-length pilot, with the hope that a series in a standalone half-hour format would be produced later. Following a mediocre reception, HBO chose to not produce more episodes.

== Premise ==
The series opens with a narration written and spoken by co-creator Lynch: "For a millennium, the space for the hotel room existed, undefined. Mankind captured it, and gave it shape and passed through. And sometimes when passing through, they found themselves brushing up against the secret names of truth."

Each story that follows takes place in a different year, but confined to room 603 in the fictional Railroad Hotel in New York City. The same bellboy and maid appear in each story, as if they do not age.

== Cast ==
=== Episode 1: Tricks ===
- Glenne Headly as Darlene
- Freddie Jones as Louis "Lou" Holchak
- Harry Dean Stanton as Moe Boca

=== Episode 2: Getting Rid of Robert ===
- Griffin Dunne as Robert
- Deborah Unger as Sasha
- Mariska Hargitay as Diane
- Chelsea Field as Tina

=== Episode 3: Blackout ===
- Crispin Glover as Danny
- Alicia Witt as Diane

=== Recurring ===
- Clark Heathcliff Brolly as Sean the Bellboy
- Camilla Overbye Roos as Maid

== Production ==
Barry Gifford wrote and Lynch directed the first and third episodes. Lynch had previously adapted Gifford's novel Wild at Heart for his 1990 film of the same name. Jay McInerney wrote and James Signorelli directed the second episode. The series was produced by Deepak Nayar, who also worked with Lynch on Wild at Heart, Twin Peaks: Fire Walk with Me and On the Air; and executive produced by Monty Montgomery and Lynch. Cinematographer Peter Deming previously worked with Lynch on On the Air. The music was composed, conducted and orchestrated by Lynch's frequent collaborator Angelo Badalamenti, while Lynch was responsible for sound design as in many of his other projects.

According to Gifford, HBO was trying to emulate the success of its anthology series Tales from the Crypt, but "wanted sexier or comedic pieces, not serious sex and not satire exactly, but something else."

Gifford wrote five scripts for the series, three of which HBO chose not to produce. He retained the rights to all five, and has turned them into plays performed in the U.S. The teleplays for "Tricks" and "Blackout", along with the unproduced "Mrs. Kashfi", which HBO deemed too controversial, were published in a book by the University Press of Mississippi. "Blackout" was written in just two days, to replace a David Mamet script that Montgomery was dissatisfied with. Gifford's script was only 17 pages long, but Lynch's cut of it came in at 47 minutes, the longest of the three episodes. HBO aired a truncated version of it, but the VHS release of Hotel Room contains the longer, and director's preferred, version.

== Episodes ==
No.	Title	Directed by	Written by	Original release date
1	"Tricks"	David Lynch	Barry Gifford	January 8, 1993
September 1969. Moe Boca arrives at the Railroad Hotel, where he and Darlene, a sex worker, are shown to room 603. Lou Holchak, a man from Moe's past, soon arrives and takes control. It becomes apparent to the audience that Lou does not have a reflection in the mirror. The two converse as Darlene smokes marijuana and tells them she used to be a cheerleader in Iowa. Lou reminisces about driving through Iowa with his wife Felicia, and insists Darlene perform a cheer routine for them; she obliges, then falls to the floor, light-headed. Lou picks her up, undresses her, and despite Moe's protests, has sex with her. Some time later, Moe becomes angry, recalling that Felicia was his wife, not Lou's, and Moe and Lou accuse Darlene of murdering her husband, which she denies before screaming for help and leaving the room. Lou slips his wallet into Moe's jacket and assures him that everything will be all right, but he should not wait too long. Later that night, Moe is awakened by the police looking for Lou Holchak. They find Lou's wallet in Moe's pocket, saying that the photo on Lou's drivers' license matches Moe, and arrest Moe for the murder of Felicia Boca. Moe becomes hysterical and protests as the screen cuts to black.
2	"Getting Rid of Robert"	James Signorelli	Jay McInerney	January 8, 1993
June 1992. Sasha arrives in room 603 and is soon joined by her friends Tina and Diane. After Sasha angrily berates the maid for accidentally hitting her in the head with a champagne cork, the three friends discuss Sasha's relationship with her fiance, Robert. Sasha intends to tell Robert that she is breaking up with him because they "don't talk enough", but the real reason is his cheating on her. When Robert arrives, though initially attentive to Sasha, he begins openly flirting with both of the other women and kisses Tina when she leaves. Before Sasha has a chance to end the relationship, he takes the opportunity to break up with her. Sasha becomes upset and assures him that she can change. As Robert attempts to leave, Sasha hits him over the head with a brass fireplace poker. The maid enters the room to see Sasha trying to hide the semiconscious Robert, who is bleeding from the head. After calling the doctor, the two promise not to fight anymore. They tell the maid to leave and share a kiss on the floor as the screen fades to black.
3	"Blackout"	David Lynch	Barry Gifford	January 8, 1993
April 1936. A power failure occurs in New York. A man (Danny) enters his room with Chinese food and finds his wife, Diane, on the settee with one hand over her eyes. Danny promises to take her to the doctor the following day. Diane, who may have psychological problems, soon forgets the bellboy was ever in the room and believes that Danny has been speaking Chinese. The couple allude to having known each other for 17 years, when Danny was five and Diane was three. Diane begins discussing Danny's time in the Navy (he was never in the Navy), then a giant fish that told her stories of her six children, of which she claims Danny is one. Danny says that they no longer have any children; their son drowned in a lake at age two. Diane at first seems to not remember, then to believe their child is still alive, then remembers that he is dead. Danny starts talking about his old friend "Famine", but Diane does not pay attention. As Danny watches the rain outside, Diane picks up a lit candle and begins following it around the room, then collapses. After recovering, Diane insists she was not drunk when their son drowned and that Danny was away; he protests that he was not. Diane asks that when they see the doctor tomorrow, they do not mention their son's death. The phone rings, and the caller speaks to Diane. When she speaks on the phone, she does not show any signs of neurodivergence as she does when she talks with Danny. When the call ends, Diane says it was the doctor checking up on them during the blackout. The couple eventually seem to come to terms with their son's death and kiss as the lights switch back on. They approach the window, marveling at the view of the city lights, and a light engulfs the room.

== Release ==
=== Broadcast ===
Hotel Room was broadcast on HBO on January 8, 1993, at 11 p.m., and again on January 15, at 12 a.m. The original broadcast was rated first in its time slot on HBO.

=== Home media ===
The three episodes of the anthology were released on VHS by Worldvision Enterprises. In Japan, a LaserDisc with English audio and burned-in Japanese subtitles was released by Pony Canyon. Bootleg DVDs captured from these sources also exist.

== Reception ==
The New York Times wrote: "David Lynch has long raised suspicions that his work would be most at home on late-night television, but Hotel Room indicates otherwise. This setbound omnibus drama, produced by Mr. Lynch and featuring three weak episodes set in the New York City hotel room of the title, plays like a listless visit to a Lynch-style Twilight Zone where stories go nowhere, anecdotes are pointlessly bizarre and lame quips are echoed emptily, as if banality were a form of wit." Newsday had a similar opinion: "Even if you're a diehard Twin Peaks freak who's incorrigibly wild at heart, you'll be itching to check out of this 90-minute trilogy (premiering tonight at 11) long before the door finally closes on the tedious doings in Room 603 of the Railroad Hotel in New York City." Variety was a little more positive about the third episode: "With the exception of a fine performance by Alicia Witt and a few intriguing moments, the episodes are flat and wooden, lacking the fascinating darkness of Lynch's other work." The Los Angeles Times wrote that although it would not become a hit, Lynch fans would enjoy it: "As you might expect with the talent involved, this is the Grand Hotel not quite so much of the twilight zone as of hell itself, definitely not for the tastes of typical travelers but a marvelously absorbing stay for the Lynch true-faithful, at least." In retrospect, the first episode's premise of Lou switching his identity with Moe, or possibly being his split personality, is a forerunner of the theme of identity switching that Lynch would continue to explore in Lost Highway, Mulholland Drive, Inland Empire and Twin Peaks: The Return.

== See also ==
- Room 104, a 2017 HBO series with a similar premise
