= Sin Pit =

American crime novel

- Author: Paul S. Meskil
- Language: English
- Subject: Mystery; Suspense; Crime
- Genre: Crime Fiction; Noir Fiction
- Publisher: Lion Books (#198)
- Publication date: 1953
- Publication place: United States
- Media type: Print (paperback)
- Pages: 128

Sin Pit is a crime novel by American journalist Paul S. Meskil (Jul 2, 1923–Oct 11, 2005), published by Lion Books in 1954. It is one of those rare paperback originals that has achieved cult status through a combination of circumstances, including the fact the author wrote only one work of crime fiction, the initial print run was relatively low for paperbacks at the time, the book had only one print run by the original publisher (Lion Books) and, finally, found an audience years later among collectors of 1950s paperback crime novels. Sin Pit shares all the above circumstances with another paperback crime novel published a year earlier, in 1953, that similarly achieved cult status — Black Wings Has My Angel by Elliott Chaze, published by Fawcett Gold Medal. Both authors were respected journalists their entire lives and wrote only a single crime novel that was never republished until years later, only after gaining an audience among aficionados of pulp fiction.
