= Reed Green Coliseum =

Multi-purpose sports arena in Mississippi, United States

- "The Yurt"
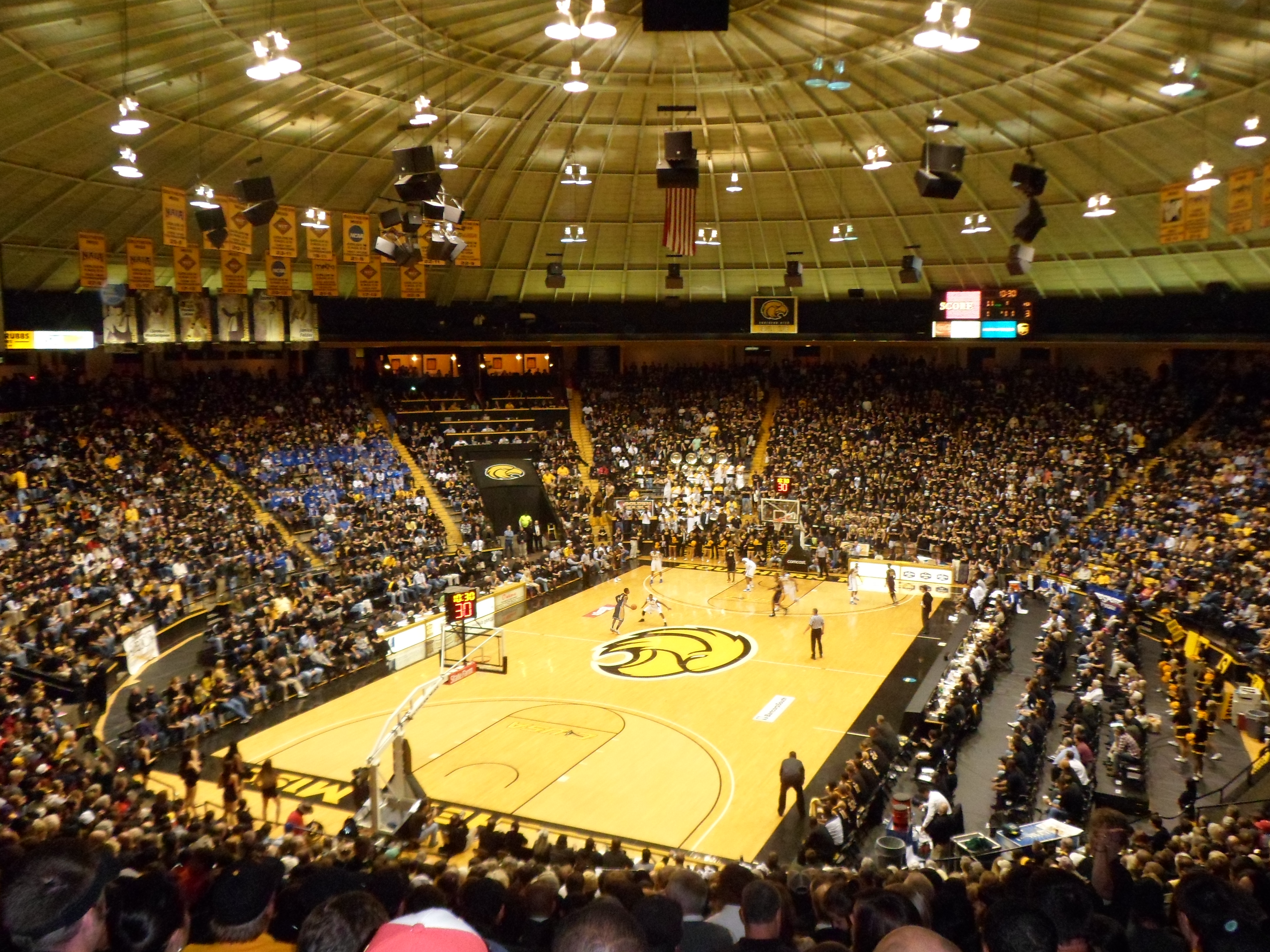
- The interior of the arena in 2012
- Interactive map of Reed Green Coliseum
- Location: 112 Coliseum Drive; Hattiesburg, Mississippi, United States
- Coordinates: 31°19′51″N 89°20′16″W
- Owner: University of Southern Mississippi
- Operator: University of Southern Mississippi
- Capacity: 8,095

Construction
- Opened: December 6, 1965

Tenants
- Southern Miss Golden Eagles (NCAA) (1965–present)

Reed Green Coliseum, nicknamed The Yurt, is an arena in Hattiesburg, Mississippi, United States. Since its opening in 1965, the arena has been the home arena of the Golden Eagles and Lady Eagles basketball teams of the University of Southern Mississippi, a member of the Sun Belt Conference (SBC) in NCAA Division I.

Presently, the arena seats 8,095, but the capacity is expected to shrink to under 7,000 after ongoing renovations are completed. The last sellout in the coliseum was on February 9, 2023, against Louisiana.

== History ==
The coliseum replaced the Mississippi Southern College Field House, later named the Sports Arena. The stadium was constructed in 1949 and sat 3,200. The university quickly outgrew this capacity, however, and the state of Mississippi allotted funding for the construction of a new coliseum.

=== 20th century ===
==== Opening and early years ====
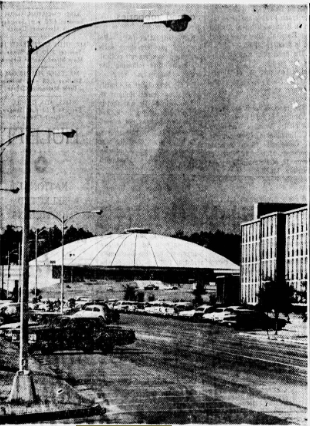
The coliseum in 1965, as photographed by the Hattiesburg American

Reed Green Coliseum was constructed in 1965. In June of that year, the estimated completion date of the stadium was mid-August. The project cost $1.4 million and sat 9,200 for basketball and up to 12,000 for special gatherings. At that point unnamed, sportswriter Carl Walters of the Clarion Ledger suggested the University of Southern Mississippi name the coliseum after longtime athletics coach and administrator Reed Green. A university spokesman announced in December that the coliseum would be named after Green.

Upon completion, the coliseum featured below-ground seating and air conditioning, featuring 2,000 chairback seats. The floor was 20 feet (6.1 m) in diameter, while the total building span was 244 feet (74 m). The measurement from the floor to the top of the domed ceiling measured 84 feet (26 m). A balcony area above the main concourse featured facilities for broadcasters, scouts, and lights and sound controllers. Concessions areas were located just off the main concourse. The upper level of the stadium featured offices for coaching staff and athletics administrators, while the lower level featured locker rooms and training rooms.

The first game at the coliseum was on December 6 as Southern Miss basketball took on Southwestern Louisiana. The Golden Eagles won that game, 71–69, in front of a crowd of over 4,000. The arena was formally dedicated on December 11, 1965, during a game against Alabama. Lieutenant Governor Carroll Gartin was on site to dedicate the new coliseum.

==== Renovations ====
A 1981 study of USM buildings found that asbestos was present inside the walls of the coliseum. In 1990, the university spent $200,000 to remove the hazardous material from the building.

=== 21st century ===
==== Renovations ====
In 2004, upgrades to the stadium's heating and cooling systems were made. In 2008, an $8.6 million renovation was completed, which added new locker rooms, coaches' offices, administrative spaces, video editing rooms, and training rooms to the coliseum.

==== "The Yurt" nickname ====
The stadium's local nickname, "The Yurt," comes from a scathing review of the stadium in 2010 left by ESPN sportswriter Dana O'Neil, who wrote:

Your first thought as you approach Southern Mississippi's Reed Green Coliseum: The Golden Eagles play in a yurt. Your second thought, as you enter the gym: The environmentally conscious, amenity-eschewing people who live in actual yurts would be aesthetically offended. The walls, presumably, were once yellow but now sit on the color spectrum somewhere between dirty mustard and old oatmeal. Three-quarters of the seats are old wooden bleachers that have seen a few decades worth of derriere wear and tear. The lighting would be welcome in prison. Thirty minutes before tipoff, 19 people are in the stands -- a pack of kids behind the basket, a collection of older folks toting their own chair backs opposite the benches, and a handful of locals spread across the rest of the building. Student section? Haven't found it. Pep band? No sign. Cheerleaders? Not yet.

— Dana O'Neil, ESPN (February 24, 2010)

The following year, Tyler Cleveland of the Hattiesburg American suggested fans adopt the "yurt" moniker, saying "(Southern Miss) might not have the best facilities, the biggest budget or the nicest equipment, but they are going to drag you into the yurt and beat your butt." The following year, another piece by the American suggested the name had picked up, claiming that the stadium has become lovingly known as "The Yurt."

==== 2027 renovations ====
In January 2015, USM athletic director Bill McGilliss announced that the coliseum would be renovated extensively, with an estimated cost between $35–$45 million. Early renderings of the project, completed by architectural firm Populous Holdings, included a new exterior facade, a new box office, the replacement of bleacher seating to all-chairback seating, a new center-hung scoreboard, upgraded concession areas, upgraded restrooms, and a new club seating office. The renovations were expected to decrease the coliseum's seating capacity from 8,095 to around 7,000. In early 2018, two new video boards were installed. In March 2018, the university sought contributions from the city of Hattiesburg to upgrade the facility. It was unclear how much financial assistance was needed, nor exactly which renovations would be conducted, though new USM athletic director Jon Gilbert said that the stadium's seating capacity would remain in the 8,000–9,000 range after the renovations. Mayor Toby Barker seemed to be approving of the city-university partnership.

In November 2023, the university received funding from the Board of Trustees of Mississippi Institutions of Higher Learning in the form of a $35 million bond. Previously, the renovations were budgeted for $15 million. With the bond, the university anticipated spending just under $43.2 million on renovations. The renovations would add 33,000 square feet (3,100 m^{2}) of space and improve the coliseum's facilities. A new entrance to the arena would be added, along with a new practice court and training facility, new bathrooms, a loading dock expansion, new scoreboards and sound systems, and 225 additional seats through the expansion of a concourse. No timetable was provided at the time of the announcement.

In May 2024, USM athletic director Jeremy McClain announced updated renderings and a timetable for the renovations, with an updated price of $35 million. New entrances would be constructed on the north and south ends of the coliseum, along with a new practice facility and weight room. Previously, a center-hung scoreboard was desired, though the coliseum's roof would not be able to support it. Instead, two new scoreboards would be implemented in the corners, along with ribbon boards around the arena's interior. 200 box seats would also be added at the top of the bowl, with renovations to seats closer to the court. Upgraded concessions areas and bathrooms were also included. Construction began in early 2025 and is expected to be completed in 2027. Upon completion, the stadium's capacity is expected to shrink from 8,096 to 6,800.

== Events ==
=== Regular events ===
==== Basketball ====
Per the university's 2025–26 media guide, the attendance record for a men's basketball game came against Missouri-St. Louis on November 28, 1981, when 8,961 were in attendance. The last sellout crowd during a Southern Miss men's basketball season came on February 9, 2023, against Louisiana. During the 2024–25 men's season, Southern Miss hosted 15 games, with a total attendance of 47,310, or 3,154 per game. This average attendance ranked Southern Miss fifth among all programs in the SBC.

The stadium also hosts the Southern Miss Lady Eagles basketball team, which began play at the coliseum on December 4, 1975, when the Eagles lost to Belhaven. The stadium has played host to three NCAA Division I women's basketball tournament games: Southern Miss's first-round game against LSU in the 1990 tournament, and its first-round game against Tennessee State and second-round game against Western Kentucky during the 1994 tournament. During the 2024–25 women's season, Southern Miss hosted 14 games, with a total attendance of 27,629, or 1,974 per game. This average attendance ranked Southern Miss second among all programs in the SBC.

==== Volleyball ====
Prior to the construction of the Southern Miss Volleyball Wellness Center, the construction of which was part of the Mississippi welfare funds scandal, the Lady Eagles volleyball team played its games and conducted practices at the coliseum.

==== University events ====
The university conducts its graduation ceremonies inside the coliseum, and has done so since the spring 1966 semester.

=== Special events ===
==== Concerts ====
The venue has played host to numerous music performances. Bob Dylan and Joan Baez performed in front of a crowd of over 10,000 during a stop on the Rolling Thunder Revue tour on May 1, 1976. Other notable performers include Charley Pride in 1977,

==== Speaking events ====
Since the venue's opening, it has played host to numerous speaking engagements. Among the first was a January 1966 lecture from radio broadcaster Paul Harvey.

== See also ==
- List of NCAA Division I basketball arenas
