= Perdita Durango (character) =

- Rosie Perez as Durango in Perdita Durango (1997)
- First appearance: Wild at Heart (1989)
- Created by: Barry Gifford
- Adapted by: David Lynch (Wild at Heart); Álex de la Iglesia (Perdita Durango)
- Portrayed by: Isabella Rossellini (Wild at Heart); Rosie Perez (Perdita Durango)

In-universe information
- Species: Human
- Gender: Female
- Occupation: Outlaw
- Significant other: Romeo Dolorosa
- Nationality: Mexican-American

Perdita Durango (Spanish: [duˈɾaŋɡo]) is a fictional character created by American novelist Barry Gifford. She is the antiheroine of Gifford's 1992 novel 59° and Raining: The Story of Perdita Durango and is portrayed by American actress Rosie Perez in its 1997 film adaptation directed by Spanish filmmaker Álex de la Iglesia.

Durango made her first appearance in Gifford's 1989 novel Wild at Heart as an accomplice to Southwestern marauder Bobby Peru. She is known for her carnal brutality and affinity for violence, which are exacerbated by her partner Romeo Dolorosa. The pair embark on deranged criminal affairs across the U.S.-Mexico border which include murder, rape, kidnapping, drug use, and sorcery.

Italian actress Isabella Rossellini played Durango in American filmmaker David Lynch's 1990 romantic crime comedy-drama thriller film Wild at Heart, an adaptation of Gifford's earlier novel.

== Character overview ==
David Rooney of Variety describes Durango's character as, "remorseless and gutter-mouthed [...] all scornful glances and tightly coiled sexual energy". In the novel 59° and Raining, she reveals herself as being, "Half Tex, half Mex". Throughout the course of the book, Durango is involved in many grotesque acts—at one point suggesting to her criminal lover Romeo Dolorosa that they kidnap and cannibalize a young couple for fun. She also has no qualms with rape or murder, partaking in the former act with a teenage victim named Dwayne, a target of the couple's aforementioned kidnapping.

== Role in the plot ==
=== Wild at Heart ===
In Wild at Heart, Durango's character is involved with psychotic bandit Bobby Peru in the fictional town of Big Tuna, Texas. Sailor Ripley and Lula Fortune—the main characters of the story—show up to Big Tuna, with Sailor and Durango apparently being acquainted with one another as Sailor asks her about whether there has been a hit placed on him by big shot gangster Marcelles Santos or Marietta Fortune, Lula's mother. Durango lies to Sailor and tells him that no such thing has happened.

Later on in the story, Peru and Sailor plan on robbing a feed store for some quick cash. Unbeknownst to Sailor, the robbery is a ploy to double-cross him and carry out his assassination. Durango is Peru's designated getaway driver, and as she sits in the car and waits for him to kill Sailor in the feed store, a police officer appears and begins questioning her. Inside, Peru shoots the store's clerks and it is revealed that Sailor's gun contains dummy ammunition. Peru chases Sailor out of the store, and here the police officer opens fire on Peru, causing him to fall and accidentally blow his own head off with his shotgun. Durango manages to escape into the desert.

In David Lynch's film, Durango's sister, Juana, is a hitwoman who is also involved in Sailor's attempted assassination.

=== Perdita Durango ===
Durango goes to Mexico to scatter her dead sister's ashes and crosses paths with bank-robbing outlaw Romeo Dolorosa, who engages in a scam where he pretends to be a Santería priest and hacks up corpses in cocaine-fueled ceremonies for money. After having sexual intercourse, Durango devises a plan to capture a gringo and cannibalize him as part of one of Dolorosa's ceremonies. They kidnap college student Dwayne and his girlfriend Estelle. Durango rapes Dwayne while Dolorosa rapes Estelle, and they later hold a ceremony to sacrifice her. However, this sacrifice is interrupted by a gang led by Shorty Dee, a former partner of Dolorosa's.

Durango and Dolorosa escape with Dwayne and Estelle as captives and head to a meet with Marcelles Santos' people to pick up a truckload of human fetuses heading to Las Vegas, which Santos plans to use to produce cosmetic moisturizer. The hand-off is interrupted by DEA agent "Woody" Dumas, leading to a violent confrontation between the two parties. Dolorosa escapes in the truck with Dwayne, while Durango follows with Estelle.

In Las Vegas, Dumas continues to pursue the pair, however Santos has set a trap for Dolorosa as he is upset over the deaths that occurred at the hand-off. Dolorosa and his buddy Doug go to the drop, leaving Perdita to watch the hostages. Durango's worrying leads her to release Estelle and Dwayne, and she rushes to find Dolorosa. She arrives just in time to see Reggie, Dolorosa's cousin, kill him. Durango then shoots Reggie and flees as the cops arrive, mourning Dolorosa as she walks the Las Vegas Strip alone.

== Portrayals ==
Isabella Rossellini as Durango in Wild at Heart (1990)

Italian actress Isabella Rossellini, then-partner of American filmmaker David Lynch, played Durango in his 1990 film adaptation of Wild at Heart. In the film, Durango sports a bright yellow hairdo, unibrow, and pink lipstick, and her characterization is seen as, "apathetic and sardonic, unreacting and uncaring".

In stark contrast, Rosie Perez's portrayal of Durango is a lot more spontaneous and feral. Her design is made up of darker shades as opposed to the vibrant colors of Rossellini's character.
