= Who Killed Buster Sparkle? =

2019 novel by John W. Bateman

- First edition
- Author: John W. Bateman
- Language: English
- Genre: Southern Gothic
- Publisher: Unsolicited Press
- Publication date: 2019
- Publication place: United States
- Media type: Print (hardback, paperback), ebook
- Pages: 280 pages
- ISBN: 1947021893 First edition hardback

Who Killed Buster Sparkle?, written by John W. Bateman, is a Southern Gothic novel published by Unsolicited Press.

== Synopsis ==
Set in Clover, Mississippi, the novel revolves around a drag queen named Peaches who is suddenly visited by Buster, the ghost of an African American man, who may or may not have been murdered.

== Release ==
Who Killed Buster Sparkle? was first published in print, hardback, and ebook format in the United States on June 12, 2019, through Unsolicited Press. Distributed through Ingram Book Group.

== Reception ==
The Clarion-Ledger praised Who Killed Buster Sparkle?, calling it "a riveting mystery that you won’t want to put down" and Ambush Magazine named it Book of the Month for May 2020 and calls it a "fabulous read" with a "fresh and exciting storyline." Who Killed Buster Sparkle? debuted on the Mississippi Top Reads list at #9 on June 30, 2019. The novel and author were included in the 2019 Eudora Welty Writers' Symposium as well as the 2021 Glitterary Festival in Oxford, MS.

=== Awards ===
- ScreenCraft Cinematic Book Competition (2019, won)
- Award in Fiction by the Mississippi Institute of Arts & Letters (2020, nominated)
