= Tina L'Hotsky =

American screenwriter

Christine Lhotsky (November 3, 1951 – August 16, 2008), better known as Tina L'Hotsky, was an American actress, writer, and filmmaker. L'Hotsky was also a personality in the lower Manhattan scene in the late 1970s and early 1980s, becoming known as Queen of the Mudd Club.

== Life and career ==
L'Hotsky was born to Jerome Romano Lhotsky and Geneieve Krupa in Cleveland, Ohio on November 3, 1951. She studied Art and Design at the Cleveland Institute of Art and moved to New York to write and direct films. When L'Hotsky arrived Manhattan's East Village in 1974, she reinvented herself with an avant-garde personality. She became a fixture at the Mudd Club from its inception, known as the self-proclaimed Queen of the Mudd Club. She organized various theme nights. In 1977, L'Hotsky wrote, produced, and directed the short film Barbie. In 1978, she published her photo-fiction book Muchachas Espanola Loca (Crazy Spanish Girls). L'Hotsky wrote lyrics for the Dutch electronic and cold wave group Minny Pops on their debut album Drastic Measures, Drastic Movement (1979). As an actress, she starred in Melvie Arslanian's Stiletto (1981), and opposite Willem Dafoe in Kathryn Bigelow and Monty Montgomery's The Loveless (1981).

In 1981, L'Hotsky began having an affair with Brooklyn-born artist Jean-Michel Basquiat who called her "Big Pink". Courtney Love's character in the 1996 film Basquiat is based on L'Hotsky.

L'Hotsky died of complications from breast cancer in Pasadena, California, on August 16, 2008. She was survived by her son Noah Lhotsky (son of Mark Rovelli) and her siblings.

== Filmography ==
Year	Film	Role
1977	Barbie	
1980	The Long Island Four	
1981	The Loveless	Sportster Debbie
1981	Stiletto	Nadja Vidal
1989	Confessions on B Street	Wednesday Weld
