= List of awards and nominations received by Rosie Perez =

List of Rosie Perez's awards
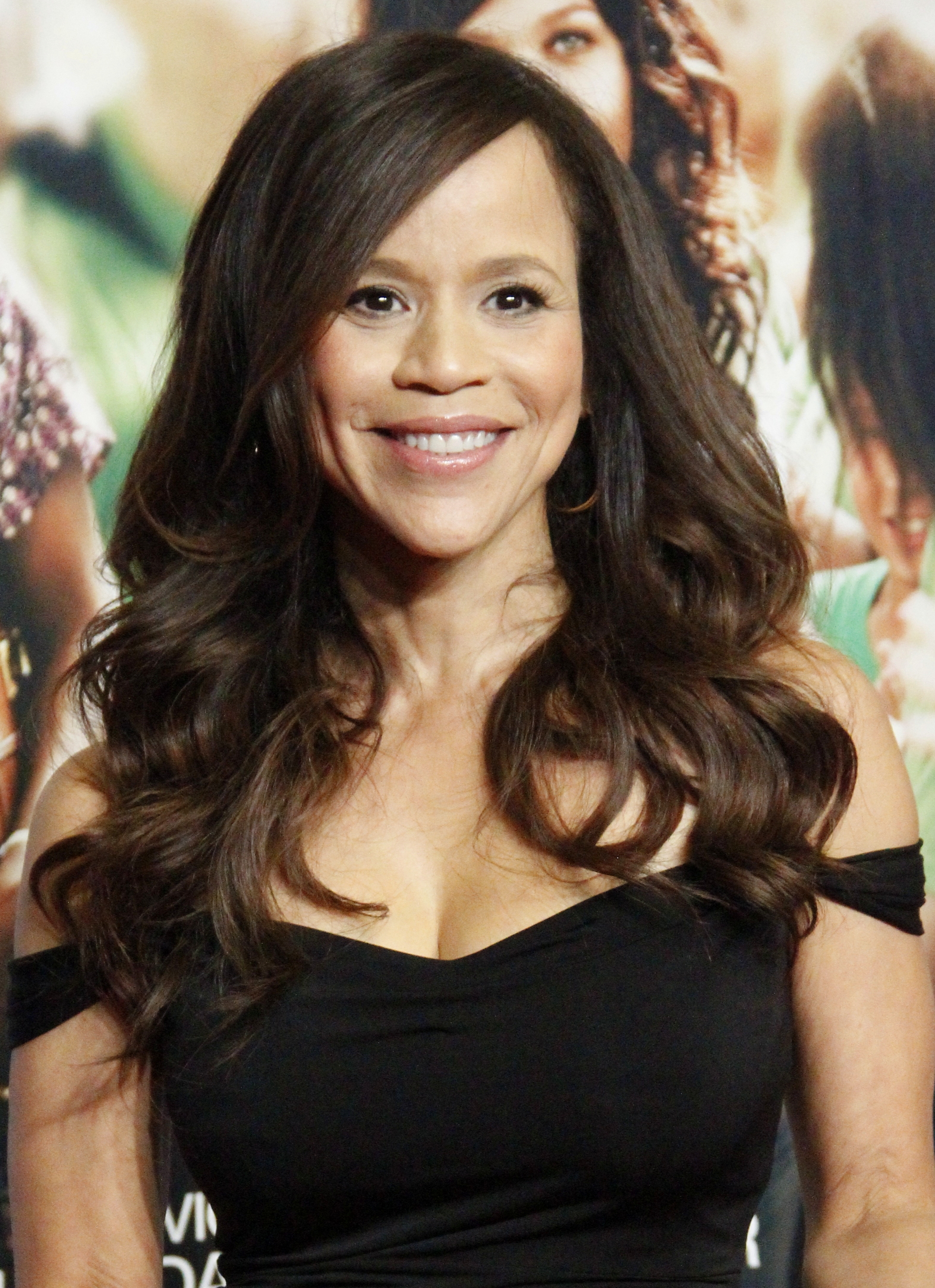
- Perez in 2012
Award	Wins	Nominations
Academy Awards	0	1
Golden Globe Award	0	1
Primetime Emmy Award	0	4
Screen Actors Guild Awards	0	1

The following is a list of awards and nominations received by Rosie Perez, an American actress known for her roles on the stage and screen.

Perez became known for her breakout film role as Tina in Spike Lee's critically acclaimed drama film Do the Right Thing (1989). She also starred in drama White Men Can't Jump (1992) for which she received two nominations from the Chicago Film Critics Association. In 1993, she has received an Academy Award for Best Supporting Actress nomination for her performance in the Peter Weir directed American drama film Fearless. In 2007 she received an Independent Spirit Award for Best Supporting Female nomination for her performance in the crime drama The Take. For her work in television she received three Primetime Emmy Award for Outstanding Choreography nominations for her work on the sketch comedy series In Living Color. She also appeared in Lipstick Jungle (2009-09), Law and Order: Special Victims Unit (2009), Nurse Jackie (2012), Search Party (2016), and She's Gotta Have It (2019). She also appeared in the HBO drama series The Flight Attendant (2020) for which she was nominated for the Screen Actors Guild Award for Outstanding Performance by an Ensemble in a Comedy Series.

== Major associations ==
=== Academy Awards ===
Year	Category	Nominated work	Result	Ref.
1993	Best Supporting Actress	Fearless	Nominated	

=== Emmy Awards ===
Year	Category	Nominated work	Result	Ref.
Primetime Emmy Awards
1990	Outstanding Individual Achievement in Choreography	In Living Color	Nominated	
1992	Outstanding Individual Achievement in Choreography	In Living Color	Nominated	
1993	Outstanding Individual Achievement in Choreography	In Living Color	Nominated	
2021	Outstanding Supporting Actress in a Comedy Series	The Flight Attendant	Nominated	
Daytime Emmy Awards
2016	Outstanding Entertainment Talk Show Host	The View	Nominated	

=== Golden Globe Awards ===
Year	Category	Nominated work	Result	Ref.
1993	Best Supporting Actress - Motion Picture	Fearless	Nominated	

=== Screen Actors Guild Awards ===
Year	Category	Nominated work	Result	Ref.
2020	Outstanding Ensemble in a Comedy Series	The Flight Attendant	Nominated	

=== Independent Spirit Awards ===
Year	Category	Nominated work	Result	Ref.
2008	Best Supporting Female	The Take	Nominated	

== Miscellaneous awards ==
Year	Category	Nominated work	Result	Ref.
1991	Chicago Film Critics Association Award for Most Promising Actress	Night on Earth	Nominated	
1992	Chicago Film Critics Association Award for Most Promising Actress	White Men Can't Jump	Nominated	
1992	Chicago Film Critics Association Award for Best Supporting Actress	White Men Can't Jump	Nominated	
1993	New York Film Critics Circle Award for Best Supporting Actress	Untamed Heart	2nd Place	
1993	Berlin International Film Festival Award for Outstanding Performance	Fearless	Nominated	
1993	Boston Society of Film Critics Award for Best Supporting Actress	Fearless	Won	
1993	Chicago Film Critics Association Award for Best Supporting Actress	Fearless	Won	
1993	Dallas–Fort Worth Film Critics Association Award for Best Supporting Actress	Fearless	Won	
1993	Los Angeles Film Critics Association Award for Best Supporting Actress	Fearless	Won	
1993	New York Film Critics Circle Award for Best Supporting Actress	Fearless	2nd Place	
1997	Fantafestival Award for Best Actress	Perdita Durango	Nominated	
1999	ALMA Award for Outstanding Actress in a Feature Film	The 24 Hour Woman	Nominated	
1999	Black Reel Award for Best Actress	The 24 Hour Woman	Nominated	
2004	Black Reel Award for Best Supporting Actress – Television	Lackawanna Blues	Nominated	
2004	NAACP Image Award for Outstanding Actress - Television	Lackawanna Blues	Nominated	
2010	Gracie Allen Award for Outstanding Female Lead in a Drama Special	Lies in Plain Sight	Won	
2010	NAACP Image Award for Outstanding Actress - Television	Lies in Plain Sight	Nominated	
2010	Imagen Foundation Award for Best Actress – Television	Lies in Plain Sight	Nominated	
