= Wettermark =

1969 novel by Lewis Elliott Chaze

- Author: Elliott Chaze
- Language: English
- Subject: Crime; Mystery
- Genre: Crime Fiction; Noir fiction
- Publisher: Scribner, New York
- Publication date: 1969
- Publication place: United States
- Media type: Print (hardcover)
- Pages: 159
- ISBN: 0-709-01725-1
- OCLC: 654631146
- Dewey Decimal: 813.54

Wettermark is a crime novel written by American novelist Elliott Chaze, published by Scribner, New York in 1969. Title character Cliff Wettermark is down on his luck when he decides to rob a bank to help fix the things in his life that money can buy.

== Summary ==
In Catherine, Mississippi, Cliff Wettermark has managed to burn bridges with several jobs including the Associated Press, the Times-Picayune, and a PR job for a chiropractor, and he now has a dead-end job as a reporter for the Catherine, Mississippi Call. Nothing seems to be going right in Cliff's life. He and his wife live in a hovel, he owes the bank $600, his wife needs her teeth fixed and he has what the local GP says looks cancerous on the side of his nose.

When Cliff goes and visit's the office of the local bank manager to ask for an extension on his loan, while he's waiting he hears that a bank robber has just held up the drive-thru window of another bank and made off with $10,000. Cliff leaves to get the story, but he can't help but think of the thief's action in acquiring that much money. It went against everything in Cliff's experience with the process of securing money from a bank.

After leading a sarcastic interview with a visiting Senator, he loses his job at the Catherine and his thoughts start to settle in about robbing a bank on his own. The reality of the act had opened his eyes to new possibilities. He knew that banks were and could be robbed but before now he had never considered doing it himself. He thought that only professionals who had the courage, skill and persistence could pull off such a thing. But he also knew that the local police wouldn't and couldn't do much boosted his confidence in getting away with it. Cliff mused that the town's captain of detectives:

"He was able to make drinking a cup of coffee look as if the fate of the nation depended on it and this was the primary reason, if not the only reason, for his promotion to captain. He could not track an army tank in fresh mud."

So Cliff starts to stake out a bank in a town a few counties over and begins making his plans.

== Reviews ==
Bill Pronzini stated that "Wettermark is by turns funny, sad, bitter, mordant, and ultimately as dark and unforgiving as Black Wings Has My Angel — a brilliant character study that is likewise unreservedly recommended and that somebody damned well ought to reprint." He called the title character Cliff "a tragicomic figure, accent on the tragic — a tired, financially strapped, ex-alcoholic wage slave whose novelist ambitions have long since been shattered by rejection and apathy."
