= Goodbye Goliath =

1983 novel by Elliott Chaze

- Author: Elliott Chaze
- Language: English
- Subject: Mystery; Detective
- Genre: Crime Fiction; Mystery fiction
- Publisher: Scribner, New York
- Publication date: 1983
- Publication place: United States
- Media type: Print (hardcover)
- Pages: 180
- ISBN: 0-684-17844-3
- OCLC: 8929565
- Dewey Decimal: 813.54
- LC Class: PS3505.H633 G6 1983

Goodbye Goliath is a detective mystery novel written by American Elliott Chaze, published by Scribner, New York in 1983. It is the first of three novels featuring three recurring characters in a small Southern town: editor Kiel St. James; Crystal Bunt, Kiel's young photographer girlfriend; and Chief of Detectives Orson Boles.

== Plot ==
In a small Alabama town, John Robinson, a disliked general manager of the local paper, The Catherine Call, is found murdered in the news room with a spike through his head. Managing editor Kiel St. James takes it upon himself to solve the crime to help keep the newspaper going.

== Reviews ==
The New York Times said "besides being a traditional, cleverly plotted murder mystery, Goodbye Goliath is an accurate picture of how a small-town newspaper operates. Mr. Chaze, himself a former city editor for a Mississippi paper, knows the ins and outs of the news room. He tells his story with a good deal of sophistication, including some sexual humor that never becomes offensive."

Reviewing Goodbye Goliath, along with two other novels by Chaze, Mr. Yesterday (1984) and Little David (1985), a reviewer for The New Yorker described them as "good, down-home fun with much flavorful redneck talk...plenty of excitement too."
