= Rosie Perez =

American actress (born 1964)

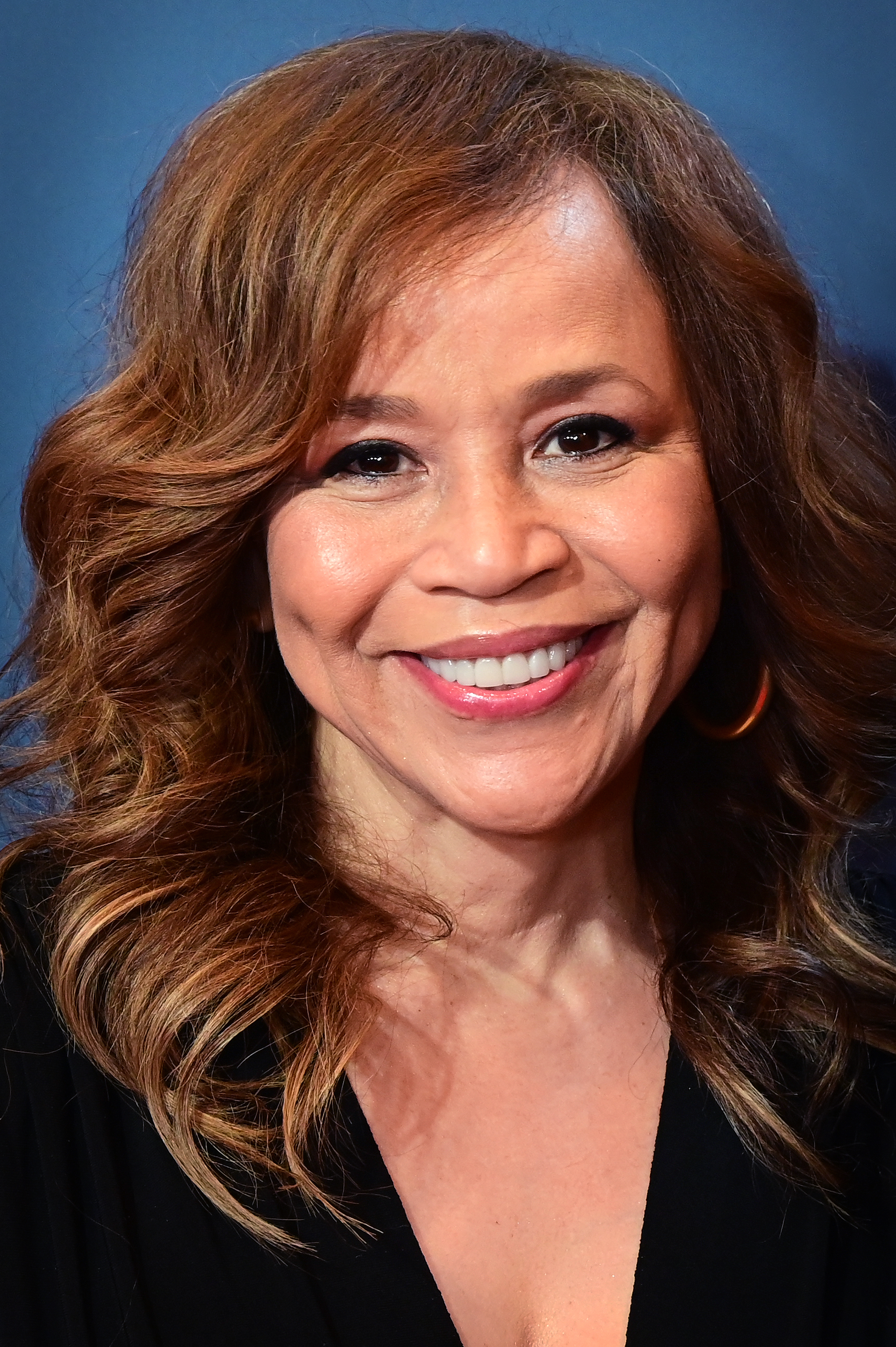
- Perez in 2026
- Born: Rosa Maria Perez; September 6, 1964 (age 62); Brooklyn, New York, U.S.
- Education: Los Angeles City College; West Los Angeles College
- Occupations: Actress; dancer
- Years active: 1983–present
- Spouses: Seth Zvi Rosenfeld (m. 1998; div. 2001) Eric Haze (m. 2013)
- Awards: Full list

Rosa Maria Perez (born September 6, 1964) is an American actress. Her breakthrough came at age 24 with her portrayal of Tina in the film Do the Right Thing (1989). Her starring film roles since include It Could Happen to You (1994), The Road to El Dorado (2000), The Take (2007), Pineapple Express (2008), and Birds of Prey (2020).

Among other accolades, Perez was nominated for the Academy Award for Best Supporting Actress for Fearless in 1994. Perez earned three Primetime Emmy Award nominations for In Living Color (1990–94) and another Emmy nomination for her work in The Flight Attendant (2020–22).

She has performed in stage plays on Broadway such as The Ritz, Frankie and Johnny in the Clair de Lune, and Fish in the Dark. She was also a co-host on the ABC talk show The View during the series' 18th season.

== Early life ==
Perez was born on September 6, 1964, in the Bushwick neighborhood of Brooklyn, New York City, to Lydia Pérez and Ismael Serrano, a merchant marine seaman. Her mother Lydia (née Fontañez y Reyes) was born in Humacao, Puerto Rico. Her father was from Aguadilla, Puerto Rico. Her mother was married to a man 20 years her senior, Arturo Pérez. Her mother already had five children when she became pregnant with Rosie after having an affair with Serrano. Perez was born at the now-closed Greenpoint Hospital in the Greenpoint neighborhood of Brooklyn.

One of 10 children born to her mother, Perez grew up in Bushwick with her siblings while their mother was intermittently jailed. Her mother gave birth to her youngest child while incarcerated. Perez was for a time raised by an aunt and then, like her siblings, went through group homes and foster care. She and her siblings were often split up. She was transferred to a group foster home and lived in foster care in New York and Peekskill until the age of eight. She was legally considered a ward of the State of New York until age 12. Her mother and aunt frequently visited, and her father made an unsuccessful custody bid at one point.

When she was in third grade, Perez learned that she had a speech impediment. She had a strict Catholic upbringing, which she has credited to the influence of the nuns during her childhood. She eventually moved in with her paternal aunt, Ana Dominga Otero Serrano-Roque.

She attended Grover Cleveland High School, in the Ridgewood neighborhood of Queens. By 1999, her mother was living in poverty in the Woodside Houses, when she died of AIDS-related complications.

== Career ==
At 19 years old, Perez started her career in the early 1980s as a dancer on Soul Train. As a student at Los Angeles City College, with plans to major in biochemistry, she said she relieved stress by going to nightclubs for ladies' night. A talent scout from Soul Train asked Perez to appear on the show. She was not a professional dancer, but loved it so much she dropped out of school. In 1988, when she was 23 years old, Perez was noticed at the dance club Funky Reggae by Spike Lee, who hired her for her first major acting role in Do the Right Thing (1989).

Perez later choreographed music videos by Janet Jackson, Bobby Brown, Diana Ross, LL Cool J and The Boys. She was the choreographer for the dancing group the Fly Girls, who were featured on the Fox television comedy program In Living Color, and also worked as a segment producer. She made her Broadway debut in Terrence McNally's Frankie and Johnny in the Clair de Lune. Perez had her third major role in the hit comedy White Men Can't Jump (1992) co-starring Wesley Snipes and Woody Harrelson.

Perez was nominated for the Oscar for Best Supporting Actress for her role in Peter Weir's 1993 film Fearless. She attended the ceremony with her father. In 1994, she co-starred with Nicolas Cage in It Could Happen to You. In 1997, she co-starred with Javier Bardem in Perdita Durango where she played the titular character, a film in which many scenes of violence, sex and nudity were edited out of the version released in the United States but remained intact in the version released throughout Latin America. In 1999, Perez starred in Nancy Savoca's The 24 Hour Woman. She provides the voices of Click, the camera, on Nick Jr.'s Go, Diego, Go! (2005-11) and Chel, a beautiful native woman in the DreamWorks Animation film The Road to El Dorado (2000). She played corrupt police officer Carol Brazier in the Judd Apatow-produced film Pineapple Express (2008), co-starring Seth Rogen and James Franco.

Perez appeared on an episode of Law & Order: Special Victims Unit in October 2009 about pedophiles' rights. Executive producer Neal Baer said the writers had Perez in mind when they wrote the role of a young sexual abuse victim's mother. She injured her neck while filming the episode and underwent surgery to heal a herniated disc. One year after the accident, she appeared at the White House in a wheelchair, wearing a neck brace for a meeting with President Obama. In May 2011, Perez filed a lawsuit against the producers of the show, saying the injury she incurred was the result of being "recklessly pulled, grabbed, yanked, wrenched and manhandled" during filming.

In June 2013, she served as the grand marshal for the international Boxing Hall of Fame parade in Canastota, New York. In February 2014, Perez published an autobiography titled Handbook for an Unpredictable Life: How I Survived Sister Renata and My Crazy Mother, and Still Came Out Smiling... She is also the reader of the audio CD of this book. Perez said that she did not initially set out to write an autobiography, but rather a book that analyzes the causes and effects of child abuse. She said it was not until about six months after the book was published and she heard responses from others that she found the experience cathartic.

On September 3 of the same year, ABC announced Perez would join The View as a new co-host alongside moderator Whoopi Goldberg, newcomer Nicolle Wallace, and returning co-host Rosie O'Donnell. The new season began on September 15, 2014. Perez said she was initially hesitant about the job because "I didn't want to be on a show where people were just screaming at each other disrespectfully." She decided to join the cast when she learned that Bill Wolff, whom she knew from The Rachel Maddow Show, was going to be the new executive producer. In 2015, she returned to Broadway to star in Fish in the Dark, a play written by Larry David. On July 8, 2015, Perez announced she would be leaving The View.

In 2018, in a series regular role, Perez portrayed Tracey Wolfe in the NBC musical drama television series Rise, which ran for one season. She starred in the 2020 superhero film Birds of Prey, as the DC Entertainment superhero Renee Montoya / Question. Later that year, Perez starred in the comedy-drama series The Flight Attendant. She earned a Primetime Emmy Award nomination for Outstanding Supporting Actress in a Comedy Series for the role.

In 2021 Perez starred in the film adaptation of the children's book series Clifford the Big Red Dog. In 2023, she had a role in season 2 of the Showtime series Your Honor.

She was an official commentator for the Jake Paul vs. Mike Tyson boxing match.

== Activism ==
Perez is an activist for Puerto Rican rights:

- Her film Yo soy Boricua, pa'que tu lo sepas! (I'm Puerto Rican, Just So You Know!) documents her activism.
- She starred in and directed the Spanish AIDS PSA campaign "Join the Fight" for Cable Positive and Kismet Films. The campaign featured actor Wilmer Valderrama, BET's Julissa Bermudez, Telenovela actor Erick Elías, singer/actress Lorena Rojas, 2006–2007 Miss Universe Zuleyka Rivera and actress Judy Marte. An English-language campaign was also directed by Liev Schreiber.
- US President Barack Obama appointed her to The Presidential Advisory Council on HIV/AIDS (PACHA). She was sworn in on February 2, 2010.
- On January 6, 2000, she was arrested for disorderly conduct in Manhattan following a rally to protest against the U.S. Navy air weapons training, as well as other forms of payload on the government training range owned at Vieques, an island off the coast of Puerto Rico.
- Perez serves as the chair of the artistic board for Urban Arts Partnership, a New York City arts education nonprofit that uses arts integrated education programs to close the achievement gap.

== Personal life ==
Perez has suffered from high anxiety, PTSD, and depression, but with therapy, it has been greatly reduced.

Perez married filmmaker and playwright Seth Zvi Rosenfeld in 1998. The couple divorced in 2001 after three years together. She married artist Eric Haze on September 15, 2013, in Las Vegas. They live in Clinton Hill, Brooklyn as of 2014.

== Awards and nominations ==
(2021) NHMC Impact Awards (Outstanding Performance in a Series)

== Filmography ==
=== Film ===
Year	Film	Role	Notes
1989	Do the Right Thing	Tina	
1990	Criminal Justice	Denise Moore	TV movie
1991	Night on Earth	Angela	
1992	White Men Can't Jump	Gloria Clemente	
1993	Untamed Heart	Cindy	
1993	Fearless	Carla Rodrigo	
1994	It Could Happen to You	Muriel Lang	
1994	Somebody to Love	Mercedes	
1997	A Brother's Kiss	Debbie	
1997	Perdita Durango	Perdita Durango	
1998	Louis & Frank	-	
1999	The 24 Hour Woman	Grace Santos	
2000	The Road to El Dorado	Chel (voice)	
2000	King of the Jungle	Joanne	
2001	Human Nature	Louise	
2001	Riding in Cars with Boys	Shirley Perro	
2003	From the 104th Floor	Narrator (voice)	Short
2004	Exactly	Angela	Short
2005	Lackawanna Blues	Bertha	TV movie
2006	Just Like the Son	Mrs. Ponders	
2006	Lolo's Cafe	Maria (voice)	Short
2007	The Take	Marina De La Pena	
2008	Pineapple Express	Sgt. Carol Brazier	
2010	The Other Guys	Herself	
2010	Pete Smalls Is Dead	Julia	
2010	Lies in Plain Sight	Marisol Reyes	TV movie
2012	Small Apartments	Ms. Baker	
2012	Won't Back Down	Brenna Harper	
2013	The Counselor	Ruth	
2013	The Being Experience	Herself	
2013	Gods Behaving Badly	Persephone	
2014	The Hero of Color City	Red (voice)	
2014	Fugly!	Zowie	
2015	Pitch Perfect 2	The View Host	
2015	Puerto Ricans in Paris	Gloria	
2015	Five Nights in Maine	Ann	
2017	Active Adults	Zoe	
2019	The Dead Don't Die	Posie Juarez	
2019	Inside the Rain	Dr. Holloway	
2020	Birds of Prey	Renee Montoya	
2020	The Last Thing He Wanted	Alma Guerrero	
2020	For NYC	Herself	Short
2021	With/In: Volume 1	Coco	
2021	Clifford the Big Red Dog	Lucille	
2025	Highest 2 Lowest	Herself	

=== Television ===
Year	Title	Role	Notes
1990	21 Jump Street	Rosie Martinez	Episode: "2245"
1990–1991	WIOU	Lucy Hernandez	Recurring Cast
1990–1993	In Living Color	Fly Girl/Choreographer	Main Cast: Season 1–4
1991	Great Performances	Herself	Episode: "Everybody Dance Now"
1992	It's Showtime at the Apollo	Herself/Guest Host	Episode: "Episode #6.4"
1995	In a New Light: Sex Unplugged	Herself/Host	Main Host
1995	Frasier	Francesca	Episode: "Roz in the Doghouse"
1995–2000	Happily Ever After: Fairy Tales for Every Child	Various (voice)	Guest Cast: Season 1-3
1996	Saturday Night Special	Herself	Episode: "Episode #1.4"
1997	Subway Stories: Tales from the Underground	Mystery Girl	Episode: "Love on the A Train"
1999	Little Bill	Valencia	Episode: "Monty's Roar/Natural Root Pals"
2002	One World Jam: A Concert for Global Harmony	Herself/Host	Main Host
2002	Gotham Awards	Herself/Co-Host	Main Co-Host
2002	Widows	Linda Perelli	Main Cast
2003	XXI Century	Herself	Episode: "War, Peace, and Patriotism"
2004	Whoopi's Littleburg	The Flashlight Lady	Episode: "But I Still Like You"
2004	Frasier	Lizbeth	Episode: "Crock Tales"
2005	All the Invisible Children	Ruthie	Episode: "Jesus Children of America"
2005–2011	Go, Diego, Go!	Click (voice)	Main Cast
2008–2009	Lipstick Jungle	Dahlia Morales	Recurring Cast: Season 2
2009	Law & Order: Special Victims Unit	Eva Banks	Episode: "Hardwired"
2010	VH1 Rock Docs	Herself	Episode: "Soul Train: The Hippest Trip in America"
2010	Dora the Explorer	La Bruja (voice)	Episode: "Dora's Big Birthday Adventure"
2012	Fish Hooks	Chichelsea Chihuahua (voice)	Episode: "Bea Dates Milo"
2012	Nurse Jackie	Jules	Episode: "Slow Growing Monsters"
2012	Falcón	Madeleine Flowers	Episode: "The Silent and the Damned"
2012	RuPaul's Drag Race All Stars	Herself/Guest Judge	Episode: "All Star Girl Groups"
2012–2013	The Cleveland Show	Choni (voice)	Recurring Cast: Season 3-4
2013	Anderson Live	Herself/Co-Host	Episode: "Co-Host Rosie Perez/'Spartacus"
2013	In the Woods	Herself	Main Cast
2013	American Latino TV	Herself	Episode: "Episode #12.6"
2014	Park Bench with Steve Buscemi	Herself	Episode: "Hair Apparent"
2014–2015	The View	Herself/Co-Host	Guest Co-Host: Season 17, Main Co-Host: Season 18
2014–2017	Penn Zero: Part-Time Hero	Aunt Rose (voice)	Recurring Cast
2015	The Nightly Show with Larry Wilmore	Herself/Panelist	Episode: "Starbucks's "Race Together" Campaign"
2015	American Masters	Herself	Episode: "The Women's List"
2016	Search Party	Lorraine De Coss	Recurring Cast: Season 1
2017	Then and Now with Andy Cohen	Herself	Recurring Guest
2017	Nightcap	Herself	Episode: "Guest in a Snake"
2017	Pure	Phoebe O'Reilly	Main Cast: Season 1
2017–2019	Bounty Hunters	Nina Morales	Main Cast
2017–2019	Elena of Avalor	Dulce (voice)	Recurring Cast: Season 2, Guest: Season 3
2018	Unsung	Herself	Episode: "The Boys"
2018	Project Runway All Stars	Herself/Guest Judge	Episode: "Posen on the Red Carpet"
2018	Rise	Tracey Wolfe	Main Cast
2019	High Maintenance	Adriana	Episode: "Proxy"
2019	She's Gotta Have It	Doña Lucy Christina	Episode: "#OhJudoKnow?"
2020–2022	The Flight Attendant	Megan Briscoe	Main Cast
2021	Mike Tyson: The Knockout	Herself	Episode: "Part 1-2"
2021	NYC Epicenters 9/11→2021½	Herself	Episode: "Part 1-4"
2021	Maya and the Three	Cipactli (voice)	Recurring Cast
2022	Black Market with Michael K. Williams	Herself/Guest Host	Episode: "Thirst Trap"
2022	The DAZN Boxing Show	Herself/Analyst	Episode: "Canelo Álvarez vs. Gennadiy Golovkin III: Weigh-In"
2022	Now & Then	Flora Neruda	Main Cast
2022	Big City Greens	Mrs. Torres	Episode: "The Delivernator"
2022–2023	Human Resources	Petra the Ambition Gremlin (voice)	Recurring Cast
2023	Your Honor	Olivia Delmont	Recurring Cast: Season 2
2024	Dancing with the Stars	Herself/Guest Judge	Episode: "Soul Train Night"
2024	SpongeBob SquarePants	Suzie Groove (voice)	Episode: "Tango Tangle"
2024	Fantasmas	Bianca	Episode: "The Void"
2024	City Island	Rosey Rivet (voice)	Episode: "Maker Hill"
2024	Before	Denise	Main Cast
2023–2025	Big Mouth	Petra (voice)	Guest Cast: Season 7-8
2024–2025	Grimsburg	Martina Martinez (voice)	Recurring Cast

=== Video games ===
Year	Film	Role	Notes
2010	Dora the Explorer: Dora's Big Birthday Adventure	La Bruja	

=== Music video ===
Year	Artist	Song
1989	Joyce Irby featuring Doug E. Fresh	"Mr. DJ"
2008	Little Jackie	"The World Should Revolve Around Me"

=== Theatre ===
Year	Title	Role	Playwright	Notes
2002	Frankie and Johnny in the Clair de Lune	Frankie (replacement)	Terrence McNally	Belasco Theatre, Broadway
2004	Reckless	Pooty / Sue	Craig Lucas	Biltmore Theatre, Broadway
2007	The Ritz	Googie Gomez	Terrence McNally	Studio 54, Broadway
2015	Fish in the Dark	Fabiana Melendez	Larry David	Cort Theatre, Broadway

=== Documentary ===
Year	Film
2000	My Generation
2005	Yo soy Boricua, pa'que tu lo sepas!
2006	Home
2008	Big Pun: The Legacy
2011	Brooklyn Boheme
2015	Stretch and Bobbito: Radio That Changed Lives
2016	Michael Jackson's Journey from Motown to Off the Wall
2016	Muhammad Ali: A Life
2017	My Name Is Pedro
2018	Pa'lante
2020	Have a Good Trip: Adventures in Psychedelics

== Published works ==
- Bourke, Alison P.; Shapiro, Evan; Perez, Rosie; Sherman, Roger M.; Garbus, Liz; Kennedy, Rory; Smits, Jimmy; Taverna, Kathryn; Hurwitz, Tom; Valdez, Carlos (2007). ¡Yo Soy Boricua, Pa'que Tu Lo Sepas!: I'm Boricua, Just So You Know!. Santa Monica, Calif.: Genius Entertainment. ISBN 978-1-59444-303-9. OCLC 123120491.
- Perez, Rosie (2014). Handbook for an Unpredictable Life: How I Survived Sister Renata and My Crazy Mother, and Still Came Out Smiling (with Great Hair). New York: Crown Archetype. ISBN 978-0-307-95239-4. OCLC 858159344.

== See also ==
- List of Afro-Latinos

Media offices
Preceded by Sherri Shepherd	The View co-host 2014-2015	Succeeded by Joy Behar
