= James Signorelli =

American director and cinematographer

- Born: US
- Occupations: Film director, cinematographer

James Signorelli is an American film director and cinematographer. He was the film segment producer for more than 400 episodes of Saturday Night Live from 1976 until 2011. He has produced many of the commercial parodies for which the show is noted.

== Selected filmography ==
- Super Fly (1972) (director of photography)
- Black Caesar (1973) (directory of photography, Harlem sequence)
- Saturday Night Live (1976-2011) (film producer)
- The Concert in Central Park, concert film of Simon & Garfunkel (1982) (producer only)
- Easy Money (1983)
- Elvira: Mistress of the Dark (1988)
- Hotel Room, episode 2: "Getting Rid of Robert" (1993)
