= The Loveless =

1981 film by Kathryn Bigelow and Monty Montgomery

- Theatrical release poster
- Directed by: Kathryn Bigelow; Monty Montgomery
- Written by: Kathryn Bigelow; Monty Montgomery
- Produced by: Grafton Nunes; A. Kitman Ho
- Starring: Willem Dafoe; Marin Kanter; Robert Gordon; J. Don Ferguson
- Cinematography: Doyle Smith
- Edited by: Nancy Kanter
- Music by: Robert Gordon
- Distributed by: Atlantic Releasing
- Release dates: August 7, 1981 (Locarno Film Festival); January 20, 1984 (United States)
- Running time: 85 minutes
- Country: United States
- Language: English
- Budget: $800,000

The Loveless (originally titled Breakdown) is a 1981 American independent outlaw biker drama film written and directed by Kathryn Bigelow and Monty Montgomery, the feature film directorial debut of both directors and stars Willem Dafoe and musician Robert Gordon, who also composed the music for the film. The film has been compared to The Wild One.

== Plot ==
In the 1950s, Vance, a loner, rides his road bike past a woman with a flat tire. He changes it for her, but then takes all the money from her wallet. He meets his friends, a motorcycle gang of greasers, at a rural roadside diner and gas station en route to Daytona. Their stay in town is extended as one of them, Hurley, has to fix his motorcycle which should take upwards of a day. The owners of the diner and gas station are nervous and one of the customers, Tarver, seems to be violently resentful toward them. The bikers hang around the garage, tinkering with their bikes, playing chicken with switch-blades, drinking, dancing and so on. A teenage girl named Telena, who is Tarver's daughter, arrives in a red open-topped Corvette. Vance talks to her and they go for a drive, buying beers and whiskey for the rest of the gang. Vance and Telena go to a motel room where they have sex. As they are about to leave, they are disturbed by gun shots outside. It is Tarver, who spotted her car, and in a typical fit of anger decided to shoot out the car tires in order to punish her. He breaks into the room and takes Telena with him. Some of the other bikers, in a chance encounter, run Tarver's car off the road, causing him to crash his car. Telena is injured in the accident.

Later in the evening, the gang is in a local bar. Augusta, one of the waitresses from the diner who is bored with life in town, performs a striptease dance and the male customers of the bar become a little feverish. While in the men's room of the bar, Tarver convinces Sid, his brother, to join him in ambushing and killing the bikers later along the road, despite Tarver having earlier "earnestly" congratulated Vance for the sexual encounter with Telena as fulfilling the needs of a man. Ricky, one of the bikers, goes to the bathroom to use the urinal, and Tarver, sensing an opportunity, attacks Ricky with his pants down. The struggle spills out into the bar where the violence escalates and gun shots ring out. Tarver is shot, and as the confusion in the bar reigns, the assumption is that the bikers have shot him in revenge, but it is Telena who has shot her father in response to his lifelong abuse of her and her mother, who committed suicide in that abuse. Further gun-shots are fired.

Outside, Vance stands smoking and sees Telena, now in the driver seat of her car, proceed to use the same pistol to shoot herself dead. The bikers quietly get on their motorcycles as they ride out of town.

== Cast ==
- Willem Dafoe as Vance
- Marin Kanter as Telena
- Robert Gordon as Davis
- J. Don Ferguson as Tarver
- Tina L'Hotsky as Sportster Debbie (credited as Tina L'hotsky)
- Lawrence Matarese as La Ville
- Danny Rosen as Ricky
- Phillip Kimbrough as Hurley
- Ken Call as Buck
- Elizabeth Gans as Augusta
- Margaret Jo Lee as Evie
- John King as John
- Bob Hannah as Sid

== Production ==
Production on The Loveless began on September 22, 1980 and was shot in 22 days over the course of six weeks. The resources of MoMA's Film Study Center were utilised by Bigelow to create the aesthetic of the film. The film was funded by private investors with a budget of $800,000. The title of the film changed twice, originally titled U.S 17, then Breakdown, then The Loveless.

== Reception ==
The review aggregator website Rotten Tomatoes reported that 77% of critics have given the film a positive review based on 13 reviews. On Metacritic, the film has a weighted average score of 44 out of 100 based on five critics, indicating "mixed or average reviews". Janet Maslin of The New York Times gave the film an unfavorable review, comparing it to the 1953 film The Wild One and describing it as "a pathetic homage to the 1950's...", writing that Bigelow and Montgomery's interests in the era was depicted "no more interestingly than through a lot of silly, lifeless posturing, plus the use of colors like chartreuse." Reviewing the Blue Underground DVD for DVD Talk, Adam Tyner called it "a biker flick for the arthouse crowd" and found its deliberate pace "maddeningly dull", though he credited Dafoe's "incredible presence" and Bigelow's visual contributions. Joseph Shapiro of Frame Rated, reviewing Arrow Video's 2019 Blu-ray, described the film as "an elliptical mood piece that's frustratingly incomplete but rich in style" and "minimalist to a fault", but praised Dafoe's "magnetic" presence and concluded that it was "a worthwhile early document of its artists' singular vision".

== See also ==
- 1982 in film
- United States in the 1950s
- Outlaw motorcycle club
