= Hattiesburg American =

American newspaper

- Type: Thrice weekly newspaper
- Format: Broadsheet
- Owner: USA Today Co.
- Founded: 1897 as Hattiesburg Progress
- Headquarters: 403 Main St., Hattiesburg, MS 39401
- OCLC number: 10363305
- Website: hattiesburgamerican.com

Masthead in 2011

The Hattiesburg American is a U.S. newspaper based in Hattiesburg, Mississippi, that serves readers in Forrest, Lamar, and surrounding counties in south-central Mississippi. The newspaper is owned by USA Today Co.

== History ==
The Hattiesburg American was founded in 1897 as a weekly newspaper, the Hattiesburg Progress. In 1907, the Hattiesburg Progress was acquired by The Hattiesburg Daily News. When the U.S. entered World War I in 1917, the newspaper was renamed the Hattiesburg American.

The Hattiesburg American was purchased by the Harmon family in the 1920s and was sold to the Hederman family in 1960. Gannett acquired the newspaper in 1982.

In 2005, the Hattiesburg American received Gannett's 10th Freedom of Information Award for outstanding work on behalf of the First Amendment. In settlement documents filed in federal court in Jackson, Mississippi, the U.S. government conceded that the U.S. Marshals Service violated federal law when a marshal ordered reporters with the Associated Press and the Hattiesburg American to erase their recordings of a 2004 speech given by Supreme Court Justice Antonin Scalia at a high school in Hattiesburg.

In 2009, publication of the Hattiesburg American was moved to Gannett's Clarion-Ledger facility in Jackson, Mississippi. In 2010, Gannett announced its intention to sell the 38,000 square foot (3,500 square meter) building which housed the Hattiesburg American operations at 825 North Main Street, and an agreement was reached with a Hattiesburg Commercial Realtor to sell the building. In June 2014, the Hattiesburg American staff announced they would vacate the Main Street location and move their offices to 4200 Mamie Street in midtown Hattiesburg. By 2022, the Hattiesburg American newsroom had moved to 403 Main Street in Hattiesburg.

In 2017, Nathan Edwards, President of the Hattiesburg American, announced that the newspaper would stop its seven-days-a-week print production and publish on three days a week (Wednesday, Friday and Sunday), beginning April 5, 2017. In 2018, Edwards announced his resignation from Hattiesburg American.

== See also ==
- Lewis Elliott Chaze
- Iris Kelso
