= Black Wings Has My Angel =

1953 novel by Elliott Chaze

- Author: Elliott Chaze
- Language: English
- Subject: Mystery; Suspense; Crime
- Genre: Crime Fiction; Noir Fiction
- Publisher: Gold Medal Books
- Publication date: 1953
- Publication place: United States
- Media type: Print (hardcover, paperback)
- Pages: 154
- ISBN: 1-59654-213-6
- OCLC: 37231349
- Dewey Decimal: 813.54

Black Wings Has My Angel is a noir crime novel by American novelist Elliott Chaze, published by Gold Medal Books in 1953. It centers on an escaped convict, Tim Sunblade, and his plot to rob an armored truck in Denver. At the same time, he is wrapped up in a love/hate relationship with Virginia, a call girl he met in Louisiana.

New editions were published as One for My Money (1962), by Berkley, and as One for the Money (1985), by Robert Hale. In January 2016, the novel was reprinted under its original title by New York Review Classics. It has been described as "a flawless heist novel". A French film adaptation was made in 1990. Work on another, American film began in 2005, but has come to no fruition.

== Plot ==
The novel is narrated in the first person by escaped convict "Tim Sunblade", recently convicted of car theft. While staying at a backwoods Louisiana motel after finishing up a four-month stint working on a drilling rig on the Atchafalaya River, he meets "Virginia", a call girl whom he hires for a night. After spending several days in the motel together, the couple head west. Tim plans to abandon Virginia, but circumstances keep the couple together. The two scuffle over Tim's money, which they have sewn into the panels of a pink girdle.

They settle into a love/hate relationship after Tim realizes that Virginia might be able to help him pull off a heist that he had previously planned with a fellow inmate. They travel to Colorado, where Tim discovers that Virginia is fleeing a prostitution scandal involving politicians in New York. He informs her of his plans to rob an armored truck.

They pretend to be a married couple and buy a house in a suburban part of Denver. Tim gets a job at a factory as a steel cutter. He does research for the heist in his spare time, closely observing the schedule of a particular armored truck. One night Tim and Virginia go to a massage parlor, where Virginia's old friend Mamie calls "Jennie" and talks about how she was a debutante and came from a good family.

After spending weeks waiting for the right opportunity, the couple practice the heist. Tim has studied the armored truck and knows its schedule: the stops it makes, how long the driver and "custodian" (the inside guard) take at each location, and when the truck is most vulnerable to robbery. Tim eventually steals the truck and fatally stabs the custodian, who had been sitting with the money. Tim steals the truck while its driver is still inside the building and finds Virginia. He drives the truck inside a large trailer they have custom-built for the job. While Virginia drives their car, towing the trailer, Tim counts the money, totalling $89,000. They reach Cripple Creek, a secluded place in the woods where they had previously stayed. They push the trailer, with the armored truck and the custodian's body still inside, into a deep, water-filed mine shaft. Virginia nearly knocks Tim into the shaft while reversing the car. In the present day, Tim reveals that this account is a confession that he's writing from his prison cell.

Tim and Virginia travel to New Orleans, where they meet Eddie Arceneaux and his sister, Loralee, young adults from a wealthy family. Tim feels that he and Virginia are becoming snobby and listless, spending their money carelessly.

I was sick of Virginia, too, and of what the money had done to the both of us, changing a tough, elegant adventuress with plenty of guts and imagination into a candy-tonguing country club Cleopatra who nested in bed the whole day long and thought her feet were too damned good to walk on.

Tim runs into and snubs former neighbors from his hometown, who call him "Kenneth McLure". Eddie says that he is going to seduce Virginia and they will run away together. His sister Loralee attempts to seduce Tim. When Tim returns to his room and finds it empty, he thinks Virginia has gone off with Eddie. Virginia returns alone and Tim forces her to leave New Orleans.

They make their way to the Gulf of Mexico and end up in Tim's hometown of Masonville, Mississippi. After driving by the house of Nona Hickman, an old girlfriend, they are stopped by a pair of police officers. Fearing arrest for the heist and murder in Denver, they attempt to escape. After stopping the car, Virginia shoots and kills one of the police officers. Tim gets out of the car and Virginia panics and drives off, leaving Tim alone with the second police officer. Tim shoots and kills the officer, but he is caught by the police and beaten and tortured before being jailed. It is revealed that the original pair of police officers only suspected Tim and Virginia of having robbed a local grocery store. Tim is questioned but refuses to reveal information about Virginia.

Later, Virginia is also captured and jailed. After she seduces and knocks out a jailer, she and Tim escape and fly to Denver.

In Colorado, they stay at a hotel near the old mine shaft. They blend in with the tourists, learn to ski, and rent a house. Virginia starts to obsess about death and being in the electric chair. One day, they go out skiing and have a picnic near the mine shaft. They both feel drawn to it, tempted to look inside.

I couldn't stand not to look either. I think I'm going crazy. I've got to look at it and I can't, like a woman who's known for months she had a cancer and the doctor finally tells her it's there and he tells her where to look to see it. And she must look at it but she can't.

Tim and Virginia inch their way towards the open shaft and finally look down the 600-foot drop. Feeling relieved, they start to dance. Virginia suddenly slips and falls into the shaft opening, landing on an unstable rubble outcropping 40 feet down—still alive and screaming. Tim panics and goes back to the hotel to find rope, where he runs into his "old FBI friend", Clell Dooley, who had prosecuted him. Clell notices Tim when he runs out the door to go back to Virginia. When Clell and four or five other men find Tim, he is sitting near the mine shaft, delusionally believing that Virginia will return soon. Tim had seen that 40 or so feet down in the mine shaft, there was "a lump", like a rock sticking out and nothing else. Tim asks the men if they have seen Virginia; they carry him off, presumably to jail.

== Characters ==
- Tim Sunblade/Kenneth McLure, escaped con
- Virginia/Jennie, once a high-priced escort in New York City, fled when the ring of crime bosses she was with got caught
- Jeepie, one of Tim's partner-in-crimes in prison
- Thompson, the other of Tim's partners
- Eddie Arceneaux, infatuated with Virginia, he tries to seduce her to get her to leave Tim
- Loralee Arceneaux, Eddie's sister, is infatuated with Tim and tries to seduce him; works to help Eddie with Virginia
- Spano, Tim's coworker at the steel factory
- Brannigan, Tim's boss at the steel factory
- Mr. George & Mrs. Lila McDonald, a married couple, neighbors from Tim's hometown, who recognize him in New Orleans
- Nona Hickman, Tim's old girlfriend from his hometown
- Clell Dooley, Tim's "old FBI friend" who originally sent him to prison for grand theft auto
- Mamie, owner of a massage parlor and friend of Virginia, who used to work at her place
- Mr. & Mrs. Okror Shaiza, owners of the inn in Cripple Creek
- Baldy, the guard in the back of the armored truck

== Reviews ==
Ed Gorman wrote "Chaze is known in pulp circles for his flawless novel Black Wings Has My Angel, which many people feel is the single best novel Gold Medal published during its heyday."

In his introduction to the new 2016 edition, screenwriter Barry Gifford wrote, "nothing else Chaze wrote came anywhere close to what he had accomplished on all levels in Black Wings." The book review website The Pequod rated the book a 9.5 (out of 10.0), calling it “a bleak and seedy noir masterpiece… Chaze’s hard-boiled prose is what carries the novel.” In a 2016 retrospective review, Vulture described the book as “a perfect crime novel.”

Bill Pronzini wrote that "Black Wings Has My Angel is a book that must be experienced, not read quickly for casual entertainment. It makes demands on the reader, as any piece of quality fiction does, and those demands deliver hammerblows where other noir novels provide light raps."

== Film adaptations ==
Chaze sold the film rights to French director Jean-Pierre Mocky. Screenwriter Barry Gifford described his 1990 adaptation as "not very good."

In the early 21st century, director Alfonso Pineda Ulloa and producer and co-writer Christopher Peditto spent more than a decade working to obtain the rights to the novel. Peditto and fellow screenwriter Gifford completed a screenplay for the film in 2012, and it was set to star Tom Hiddleston as Tim Sunblade, Anna Paquin as Virginia, and Elijah Wood as Eddie Arceneaux. Filming was scheduled to start in September 2012, but shooting was put on hold after Paquin gave birth to twins and wanted to take time with them. With the loss of major stars' commitments, the project fell apart. Peditto has not officially declared the adaptation will never happen, but, as of summer 2020, he has moved to Sarajevo and is involved in other projects.

== Editions ==
This novel was reprinted in other editions: as One for My Money (1962), Berkley. After Chaze's work was rediscovered in the 1980s, it was reprinted as One for the Money (1985), by Robert Hale. New York Review Classics published a new edition, Black Wings Has My Angel (2016), with an introduction by Barry Gifford.
