= Wild at Heart (film) =

1990 film by David Lynch

- Theatrical release poster
- Directed by: David Lynch
- Screenplay by: David Lynch
- Based on: Wild at Heart by Barry Gifford
- Produced by: Monty Montgomery; Steve Golin; Sigurjón Sighvatsson
- Starring: Nicolas Cage; Laura Dern; Willem Dafoe; Crispin Glover; Diane Ladd; Isabella Rossellini; Harry Dean Stanton
- Cinematography: Frederick Elmes
- Edited by: Duwayne Dunham
- Music by: Angelo Badalamenti; David Lynch (Note: Additional Music)
- Production companies: PolyGram; Propaganda Films
- Distributed by: The Samuel Goldwyn Company
- Release dates: May 19, 1990 (Cannes); August 17, 1990 (United States)
- Running time: 124 minutes
- Country: United States
- Language: English
- Budget: $10 million
- Box office: $14.6 million

Wild at Heart is a 1990 American Southern Gothic black comedy romantic crime film written and directed by David Lynch, based on the 1989 novel of the same name by Barry Gifford. Starring Nicolas Cage, Laura Dern, Willem Dafoe, Crispin Glover, Diane Ladd, Isabella Rossellini, and Harry Dean Stanton, the film follows Sailor Ripley (Cage) and Lula Fortune (Dern), a young couple who go on the run across the Southern United States from Lula's domineering mother (Ladd) and the criminals she hires to kill Sailor.

Lynch had intended only to produce the film, but after reading Gifford's book, he decided to write and direct it as well. He disliked the ending of the novel, in which Sailor and Lula are separated, and decided to change it after discussing it with Gifford, who told him that in the sequel novel he was writing “They get back together, and they stay together, and they live to a ripe old age together.”

The film is noted for its extensive allusions to The Wizard of Oz and Elvis Presley. Early test screenings for the film were poorly received, with Lynch estimating that at least 200 people walked out due to its graphic content.

Wild at Heart premiered at the 1990 Cannes Film Festival, where it controversially won the Palme d'Or, the festival's grand prize. The film was theatrically released in the United States on August 17, 1990, to polarized reviews from critics. It grossed $14 million against its $10 million budget, which was considered a box-office disappointment. Ladd was nominated for the Academy Award for Best Supporting Actress for her performance, and the film received or was nominated for several other awards. The film has been positively reevaluated by critics in the years since its release.

== Plot ==
In Cape Fear, North Carolina, lovers Lula Fortune and Sailor Ripley are separated after he is jailed for killing a man who attacked him with a knife; the assailant, Bobby Ray Lemon, was hired by Lula's mother, Marietta. Upon Sailor's release 22 months later, Lula picks him up outside prison, where she hands him his snakeskin jacket. They have sex in a hotel room and go to see the speed metal band Powermad. At the club, Sailor berates a man for flirting with Lula, and then leads the band in a rendition of Elvis Presley's "Love Me". When Lula asks why Sailor didn't sing her his favorite song, Presley's "Love Me Tender", he tells her he will only ever sing it to his future wife.

Sailor asks Lula to run away to California with him, despite knowing this will break his parole. Marietta asks her on-off boyfriend, private detective Johnnie Farragut, to find them and bring them back. Unbeknownst to Farragut, Marietta also hires her other boyfriend, gangster Marcello Santos, to track them and kill Sailor. When Santos calls mob boss Mr. Reindeer to arrange for the job, he adds Farragut to the hit list, sending Marietta into a guilt-fueled rage. Despite her attempts to save Farragut, Mr. Reindeer's assassins capture and kill him in New Orleans, where he has tracked Lula and Sailor.

Unaware of these events, Lula and Sailor continue on their way until they encounter the aftermath of a two-car collision. They try to help the only survivor, a traumatized and brain-damaged young woman who eventually dies in front of them. Lula is disturbed, and considers it a bad omen. She is also unsettled by Sailor's revelation that he had been Santos' driver and may have witnessed her father's murder by Santos and Marietta, which places him in their crosshairs.

Nearly penniless, Sailor heads for Big Tuna, Texas, where he asks old acquaintance Perdita Durango whether someone is after him. Perdita says she is unaware of any murder contract, but is later revealed to be lying. At an outdoor party, Lula and Sailor meet career criminal Bobby Peru. Lula, who has been feeling ill, tells Sailor she is pregnant. While Sailor is changing their car's oil, Lula waits for him in the motel room. Peru enters the room, deduces Lula's pregnancy and proceeds to intimidate, grope and violently coerce her into asking him for sex; when she finally does, he mockingly reveals his threats to be a bluff and leaves. This traumatizes Lula, who was previously raped as a child.

Not knowing about Peru's abuse of Lula, Sailor agrees to accompany him to a bar. Peru enlists a drunken Sailor's help in robbing a nearby feed store. During the robbery, Peru unnecessarily shoots the two store clerks and admits to Sailor that he has been hired to kill him. Sailor tries to shoot him, but Peru reveals that Sailor's gun is loaded with dummy ammunition. Chasing Sailor out of the store, Peru is repeatedly shot by a sheriff's deputy and accidentally blows his own head off with his shotgun. Sailor is sentenced to six years in prison for his part in the robbery and breaking parole.

While Sailor is in jail, Lula has their child. Lula decides to reunite with him in Los Angeles upon his release, against her mother's wishes. She throws water over Marietta's photograph and goes to pick up Sailor with their son, Pace. The reunion is awkward, and Sailor decides to leave them both, believing they will be better off without him. A short distance away, Sailor is accosted by members of a street gang, and is quickly knocked out after insulting them. While unconscious, he sees a vision of Glinda the Good Witch, who tells him, "Don't turn away from love, Sailor." When he awakens, Sailor apologizes to the men, tells them he realizes the error of his ways, and runs after Lula. The photograph of Marietta in Lula's house sizzles and vanishes, symbolically mirroring the demise of the Wicked Witch of the West. Sailor runs over the roofs and hoods of the cars in a traffic jam to reunite with Lula and Pace. When he catches up with them, he sings "Love Me Tender" to Lula.

== Cast ==
- Nicolas Cage as "Sailor" Ripley: the actor described his character as "a kind of romantic Southern outlaw". Cage said in an interview that he was "always attracted to those passionate, almost unbridled romantic characters, and Sailor had that more than any other role I'd played." Prior to being cast in the film, Cage had met Lynch several times at Musso & Frank Grill, which they both frequented. When Lynch read Gifford's novel, he immediately wanted Cage to play Sailor.
- Laura Dern as Lula Pace Fortune: previously, Dern had played a supporting role in Lynch's film Blue Velvet. For Dern, Wild at Heart was the first opportunity she had "to play not only a very sexual person, but also someone who was, in her own way, incredibly comfortable with herself". When Lynch read Gifford's novel, he immediately thought of Dern to play Lula.
- Willem Dafoe as Bobby Peru
- J. E. Freeman as Marcellus Santos
- Crispin Glover as Dell
- Diane Ladd as Marietta Fortune, Lula's overbearing mother, who forbids Lula and Sailor's relationship; she forms a grudge against Sailor seemingly after he rejects her advances. Ladd and Dern are mother and daughter in real life.
- Calvin Lockhart as Reggie
- Isabella Rossellini as Perdita Durango
- Harry Dean Stanton as Johnnie Farragut
- Grace Zabriskie as Juana Durango
- W. Morgan Sheppard as Mr. Reindeer
- David Patrick Kelly as "Dropshadow"
- Sherilyn Fenn as girl in accident
- Freddie Jones as George Kovich
- John Lurie as "Sparky"
- Pruitt Taylor Vince as Buddy
- Jack Nance as "00 Spool"
- Marvin Kaplan as Uncle Pooch
- Frances Bay as Madam
- Peter Bromilow as Hotel Manager
- Frank Collison as Timmy Thompson
- Sheryl Lee as the Good Witch
- Charlie Spradling as Irma
- Koko Taylor as Singer at Zanzibar

== Production ==
In the summer of 1989, Lynch had finished the pilot episode for the successful television series Twin Peaks, and tried to rescue two of his earlier projects—Ronnie Rocket and One Saliva Bubble—both involved in contractual complications as a result of the bankruptcy of Dino De Laurentiis, which had been bought by Carolco Pictures. Lynch stated, "I've had a bad time with obstacles...it wasn't Dino's fault, but when his company went down the tubes, I got swallowed up in that." Independent production company Propaganda Films commissioned Lynch to develop an updated noir screenplay based on a 1940s crime novel. At the same time, producer Monty Montgomery, a friend of Lynch's and an associate producer on Twin Peaks, asked novelist Barry Gifford what he was working on. Gifford was working on the manuscript for Wild at Heart: The Story of Sailor and Lula but still had two more chapters to write. He let Montgomery read it in pre-published galley form while the producer was working on the pilot episode for Twin Peaks. Montgomery read it, and two days later, he called Gifford to say he wanted to make a film of it. Two days after that, Montgomery gave Gifford's book to Lynch while he was editing the pilot, asking him if he would executive produce a film adaptation that he would direct. Lynch remembers telling him, "That's great, Monty, but what if I read it and fall in love with it and want to do it myself?" Montgomery did not think that Lynch would like the book because he did not believe it was his "kind of thing". Lynch loved the book and called Gifford soon afterwards, asking him if he could make a film of it. Lynch remembers, "It was just exactly the right thing at the right time. The book and the violence in America merged in my mind and many different things happened." Lynch was drawn to what he saw as "a really modern romance in a violent world—a picture about finding love in Hell", and was also attracted to "a certain amount of fear in the picture, as well as things to dream about. So it seems truthful in some way".

Lynch received Propaganda's approval to switch projects; however, production was scheduled to begin only two months after the rights were purchased, forcing him to work quickly. Lynch had Cage and Dern read Gifford's book and wrote a draft in a week. By Lynch's own admission, his first draft was "depressing and pretty much devoid of happiness, and no one wanted to make it". Lynch did not like the ending in Gifford's book, where Sailor and Lula split up for good. For Lynch, "it honestly didn't seem real, considering the way they felt about each other. It didn't seem one bit real! It had a certain coolness, but I couldn't see it." It was at this point that the director's love of The Wizard of Oz (1939) began to influence the script he was writing. He included a reference to the "yellow brick road". Lynch remembers, "It was an awful tough world, and there was something about Sailor being a rebel. But a rebel with a dream of the Wizard of Oz is kinda like a beautiful thing." Samuel Goldwyn Jr. read an early draft of the screenplay and did not like Gifford's ending either, so Lynch changed it. However, the director was worried that this change made the film too commercial, "much more commercial to make a happy ending, yet, if I had not changed it, so that people wouldn't say I was trying to be commercial, I would have been untrue to what the material was saying".

Lynch added new characters, such as Mr. Reindeer and Twin Peaks actress Sherilyn Fenn as the victim of a car accident. During rehearsals, Lynch began talking about Elvis Presley and Marilyn Monroe with Cage and Dern. He also acquired a copy of Elvis' Golden Records and after listening to it, called Cage and told him that he had to sing two songs, "Love Me" and "Love Me Tender". Cage agreed and recorded them so that he could lip-synch to them on the set. Cage asked Lynch if he could wear a snakeskin jacket in the film. Lynch incorporated it into his script. Before filming started, Dern suggested that she and Cage go on a weekend road trip to Las Vegas to bond and get a handle on their characters. Dern remembers, "We agreed that Sailor and Lula needed to be one person, one character, and we would each share it. I got the sexual, wild, Marilyn, gum-chewing fantasy, female side; Nick's got the snakeskin, Elvis, raw, combustible, masculine side." Within four months, Lynch began filming on August 9, 1989, in both Los Angeles (including the San Fernando Valley) and New Orleans, with a relatively modest budget of $10 million. Originally, Wild at Heart featured more explicit erotic scenes between Sailor and Lula. In one, she has an orgasm while relating to Sailor a dream she had of being ripped open by a wild animal. Another deleted scene had Lula lowering herself onto Sailor's face, saying, "Take a bite of Lula."

=== Soundtrack ===
The film's soundtrack was composed by Lynch's frequent collaborator Angelo Badalamenti, and features music by several other artists.

The slow, heavy instrumental intro to the song "Slaughterhouse" by Minneapolis thrash metal band Powermad is used for dramatic impact several times. During the band's appearance in the club scene they perform the next, faster section of the same song, before being stopped abruptly by Sailor and invited to accompany him in a faithful lounge rendition of Elvis Presley's "Love Me".

The film features the Chris Isaak song "Wicked Game", for which Lynch directed a video featuring scenes of Sailor and Lula interspersed with black-and-white footage of Isaak performing the song.

The introduction to "Im Abendrot" from Richard Strauss' Four Last Songs is featured in several scenes.

== Themes ==
According to Lynch, one of the film's themes is "finding love in Hell". He has stated: "For me, it's just a compilation of ideas that come along. The darker ones and the lighter ones, the humorous ones, all working together. You try to be as true as you can to those ideas and try to get them on film." The film has been compared to Lynch's previous film Blue Velvet, with both said to explore the dark side of Americana.

There are various references to The Wizard of Oz, which has been interpreted as indicative of the overall fantasy world of the movie, which Sailor's obsession with the fantasies of Elvis and the couple's fantastical relationship also speak to. The movie also depicted a previously unseen level of violence. Lynch himself commented in interviews that Gifford's novel was "exactly the right thing at the right time" and that "each year we give permission for people to get away with more".

Some critics have postulated that, similarly to Blue Velvet, the film's sudden idealistic ending of perfect happiness is ironic, suggesting that people who have the potential for violence struggle to find true happiness. However, Lynch himself referred to the ending of Wild at Heart as being "happy", having consciously made the decision to replace the novel's darker ending.

== Release ==
=== Distribution ===
Early test screenings for Wild at Heart were unsuccessful, with the audience finding the violence in some scenes excessive. At the first test screening, eighty people walked out during a graphic torture scene involving Johnnie Farragut. Lynch decided not to cut anything from the film; at the second screening, 100 people walked out during the same scene. Lynch remembered that "By then, I knew the scene was killing the film. So I cut it to the degree that it was powerful but didn't send people running from the theatre." In retrospect, however, he felt "that was part of what Wild at Heart was about: really insane and sick and twisted stuff going on."

Wild at Heart was completed one day before it debuted in the main competition of the 1990 Cannes Film Festival in the 2,400-seat Grand Auditorium. The film received an ovation of "wild cheering" from the audience. When Jury President Bernardo Bertolucci announced the film as the winner of the Palme d'Or, the festival's grand prize, at the awards ceremony, jeers almost drowned out the cheers, with critic Roger Ebert leading the vocal detractors. According to Gifford, "All kinds of journalists were trying to cause controversy and have me say something like 'This is nothing like the book' or 'He ruined my book'. I think everybody from Time magazine to What's On in London was disappointed when I said 'This is fantastic. This is wonderful. It's like a big, dark, musical comedy'".

==== Rating ====
The Motion Picture Association of America (MPAA) told Lynch that the version of Wild at Heart screened at Cannes would receive an X rating in North America unless cuts were made, as the NC-17 rating was not in effect in 1990. As Lynch was contractually obligated to deliver an R-rated film, he added gun smoke to the scene where Bobby Peru shoots his own head off to obscure the gore. Foreign prints were not affected. The Region 1 DVD and early Blu-rays contain the toned-down version of the scene.

The Criterion Collection 4K / Blu-ray edition of the film of 2026 showcased a new transfer of the unrated Cannes / International Cut, supervised by Frederick Elmes and Lynch’s daughter Jennifer on behalf of the David Lynch Estate.

== Response ==
=== Box office ===
Wild at Heart opened in the United States on August 17, 1990, in a limited release of only 532 theaters, grossing US$2,913,764 in its opening weekend. It went into wide release on August 31 with 618 theaters and grossing an additional $1,858,379. The film ultimately grossed $14,560,247 in North America.

=== Critical response ===
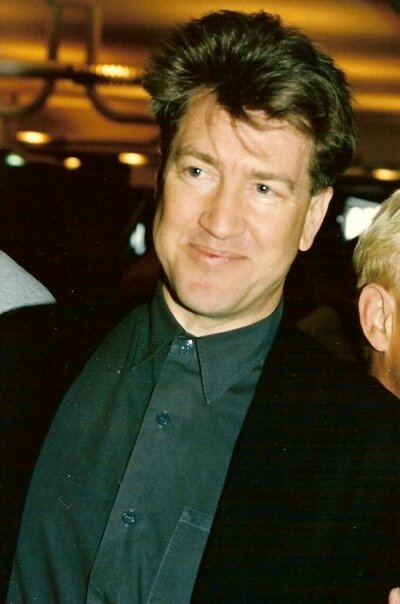
David Lynch at the 1990 Cannes Film Festival.

Wild at Heart initially received mixed reviews from critics. On the review aggregator website Rotten Tomatoes, 66% of 58 critics' reviews are positive. The website's consensus reads: "One of director David Lynch's more uneven efforts, Wild at Heart is held together by his distinctive sensibilities and compelling work from Nicolas Cage and Laura Dern." Metacritic, which uses a weighted average, assigned the film a score of 52 out of 100, based on 18 critics, indicating "mixed or average" reviews.

In his review for the Chicago Sun-Times, Roger Ebert gave the film two and a half stars out of a possible four. While contending that Lynch was "a good director", Ebert was bothered by scenes of "particularly offensive violence", possible undercurrents of racism and misogyny, and what he considered to be excessive irony: "If [Lynch] ever goes ahead and makes a film about what’s really on his mind, instead of hiding behind sophomoric humor and the cop-out of 'parody', he may realize the early promise of his Eraserhead. But he likes the box office prizes that go along with his pop satires, so he makes dishonest movies like this one." Mike Clark in USA Today gave the film one and a half stars out of four and said: "This attempt at a one-up also trumpets its weirdness, but this time the agenda seems forced."

In his review for Sight & Sound magazine, Jonathan Rosenbaum wrote: "Perhaps the major problem is that despite Cage and Dern's best efforts, Lynch is ultimately interested only in iconography, not characters at all. When it comes to images of evil, corruption, derangement, raw passion and mutilation (roughly in that order), Wild at Heart is a veritable cornucopia." Richard Combs of Time called the film "a pile-up, of innocence, of evil, even of actual road accidents, without a context to give significance to the casualties or survivors". Christopher Sharrett wrote in Cinéaste magazine: "Lynch's characters are now so cartoony, one is prone to address him more as a theorist than director, except he is not that challenging...one is never sure what Lynch likes or dislikes, and his often striking images are too often lacking in compassion for us to accept him as a chronicler of a moribund landscape a la Fellini." However, in Rolling Stone, Peter Travers praised the film as "a bonfire of a movie that confirms [Lynch's] reputation as the most exciting and innovative filmmaker of his generation."

=== Legacy ===
Wild at Heart has come to be viewed more favorably in retrospect. It was ranked the 47th best film of the 1990s in a 2017 IndieWire critics' poll, the 26th greatest film of the same period in a 2013 Complex poll, and the 53rd best in a 2017 Rolling Stone poll.

=== Awards and honors ===
At the 6th Independent Spirit Awards, Dafoe was nominated for Best Supporting Male and Elmes won for Best Cinematography. Ladd was nominated for the Academy Award for Best Supporting Actress and the Golden Globe Award for Best Supporting Actress – Motion Picture at the 63rd Academy Awards and the 48th Golden Globe Awards, respectively.

Award/association	Year	Category	Recipient(s) and nominee(s)	Result	Ref.
20/20 Awards	1990	Best Supporting Actor	Willem Dafoe	Nominated	
20/20 Awards	1990	Best Supporting Actress	Diane Ladd	Nominated	
20/20 Awards	1990	Best Original Score	Angelo Badalamenti	Nominated	
20/20 Awards	1990	Best Sound Design		Nominated	
Academy Awards	1991	Best Supporting Actress	Diane Ladd	Nominated	
Amanda Awards	1991	Best Foreign Feature Film	David Lynch	Nominated	
Belgian Film Critics Association	1992	Grand Prix		Nominated	
British Academy Film Awards	1991	Best Sound	Randy Thom, Richard Hymns, Jon Huck, David Parker	Nominated	
Cannes Film Festival	1990	Palme d'Or	David Lynch	Won	
Fantasporto	1990	Best Film	David Lynch	Nominated	
Golden Globe Awards	1991	Best Supporting Actress – Motion Picture	Diane Ladd	Nominated	
Independent Spirit Awards	1991	Best Supporting Male	Willem Dafoe	Nominated	
Independent Spirit Awards	1991	Best Cinematography	Frederick Elmes	Won	
MTV Video Music Awards	1991	Best Video from a Film	Chris Isaak—"Wicked Game"	Won	
Nastro d'Argento	1991	Best Foreign Director	David Lynch	Nominated	
Stockholm International Film Festival	1991	Bronze Horse	David Lynch	Nominated	
Turkish Film Critics Association	1990	Best Foreign Film		9th Place	
Yoga Awards	1992	Worst Foreign Director	David Lynch	Won	
Yoga Awards	1992	Worst Foreign Casting	Diane Ladd (also for Rambling Rose)	Won	

American Film Institute recognition:

- AFI's 100 Years... 100 Laughs—Nominated
- AFI's 100 Years...100 Passions—Nominated

== Proposed Sequel ==
In the mid 2010s, at the suggestion of Nicolas Cage who wanted to star in it, Lynch and Gifford actively discussed filming the final Sailor Ripley novel The Up-Down.

== See also ==
- List of cult films
