= Monty Montgomery (producer) =

American actor and filmmaker

- Born: July 4, 1963 (age 63); United States
- Occupations: Film director, producer, screenwriter, actor

Monty Montgomery is an American film producer, director, actor and screenwriter.

Montgomery is best known for his work as producer on films such as Wild at Heart and The Portrait of a Lady. He co-directed one film The Loveless (1981) with Kathryn Bigelow.

Montgomery is also known for playing the role of The Cowboy in the David Lynch film Mulholland Drive.

== Filmography ==
=== Film ===
- Wings of Ashh (1978) (associate producer) (short film)
- Union City (1980) (presenter)
- The Loveless (1981) (writer, co-director)
- The Cowboy and the Frenchman (1988) (producer) (short film)
- Daddy's Dyin': Who's Got the Will? (1990) (producer)
- Wild at Heart (1990) (producer)
- The Portrait of a Lady (1996) (producer)
- Mulholland Drive (2001) (as Cowboy)

=== Television ===
- Twin Peaks (1990) (pilot episode producer)
- Hotel Room (1993) (creator, executive producer)

=== Video ===
- Industrial Symphony No. 1: The Dream of the Broken Hearted (1990) (video version producer)
