= Perdita Durango =

- Theatrical release poster by Oscar Mariné
- Directed by: Álex de la Iglesia
- Screenplay by: Barry Gifford; David Trueba; Jorge Guerricaechevarría; Álex de la Iglesia
- Based on: 59° and Raining: The Story of Perdita Durango by Barry Gifford
- Produced by: Andrés Vicente Gómez
- Starring: Rosie Perez; Javier Bardem; Harley Cross; Aimee Graham; Screamin' Jay Hawkins; James Gandolfini
- Cinematography: Flavio Martínez Labiano
- Edited by: Teresa Font
- Music by: Simon Boswell
- Release date: 31 October 1997 (Spain)
- Running time: 126 minutes
- Countries: Spain; Mexico
- Languages: English; Spanish

Perdita Durango, released as Dance with the Devil in the United States, is a 1997 action-crime-horror film directed by Álex de la Iglesia, based on Barry Gifford's 1992 novel 59° and Raining: The Story of Perdita Durango. It stars Rosie Perez as the title character and Javier Bardem. Harley Cross, Aimee Graham, James Gandolfini, and Screamin' Jay Hawkins appear in supporting roles. It is a Spain–Mexico coproduction.

In the film, an imposter Santeria priest resorts to bank robbery to pay his debts. Afterwards, he finds a new partner in a woman he randomly met. She convinces him to include human cannibalism in his ceremonies, and to kidnap gringo college students with her. The priest heads to Las Vegas with his new companions, to meet with a gangster. Unfortunately for the priest, his supposed business associate wants him dead and has already hired a hit man for the job.

== Plot ==
Perdita Durango has gone to Mexico to scatter the ashes of her dead sister. There, she is picked up by bank-robbing drug dealer Romeo Dolorosa. Dolorosa had robbed the bank to pay off his debt to loan shark "Catalina". He also engages in scams in which he pretends to be a Santeria priest and hacks up corpses while snorting cocaine.

Romeo's latest scam is working for gangster Mr. Santos transporting refrigerated human fetuses to Las Vegas where they will be used to make cosmetic moisturizer.

Perdita devises a plan that they should capture a gringo and eat him as part of Romeo's ceremonies. They kidnap randomly chosen geeky college student Duane and his girlfriend Estelle. First, Perdita rapes Duane while Romeo rapes Estelle. They hold a ceremony to sacrifice Estelle while they force Duane to watch. Before the girl can be killed, the sacrifice is interrupted by a gang of men led by Shorty Dee, a betrayed former partner of Romeo.

Romeo and Perdita escape with Duane and Estelle still their captives. The four go to the meeting with Santos' people to pick up the truckload of fetuses. However, the hand-off is interrupted by drug enforcement agent Woody Dumas. Santos' men are all killed. Romeo escapes and drives to Vegas with Duane, while Perdita follows with Estelle.

On the trip, Romeo finds out his grandmother's house was raided by some of Catalina's men as punishment for Romeo's unpaid debt. Romeo visits Catalina in a club, pretending to offer Estelle as payment. When he gets Catalina alone, Romeo kills him.

Romeo, Perdita, Duane and Estelle finally get to Vegas. However, Dumas has been following them all the way. Moreover, the drop has become a trap for Romeo; Santos is upset about all the deaths at the pickup so he has hired Romeo's cousin Reggie to kill Romeo.

Romeo and his one-armed ex-Marine buddy Doug go to the drop, tipped off about the double-cross. Romeo leaves Perdita to watch the hostages, but Perdita's nervousness overcomes her. She lets Estelle and Duane go so she can check on her lover.

Reggie kills Doug and Perdita arrives just in time to see Reggie shoot Romeo in the back, killing him. Perdita shoots and kills Reggie and then flees as the cops bust in, led by Dumas, intending to arrest the men but instead finding them all dead.

Alone now, Perdita walks the Las Vegas Strip mourning Romeo.

=== Versions ===
The original Spanish version runs 10 minutes longer and features more sex and violence and ends with some characters digitally morphing into the scene finale from Vera Cruz.

The film is available in the United States on VHS/DVD in two versions: the edited 115 min. R-rated version and a 121 min. unrated version. Both of these are shorter than the Spanish version which has gotten a Blu-ray release in the United States.

== Cast ==
- Rosie Perez as Perdita Durango
- Javier Bardem as Romeo Dolorosa
- Harley Cross as Duane
- Aimee Graham as Estelle
- James Gandolfini as DEA Agent Willie "Woody" Dumas
- Screamin' Jay Hawkins as Adolfo
- Demián Bichir as Catalina
- Santiago Segura as Shorty Dee
- Harry Porter as "Rip" Ford
- Don Stroud as Marcello "Mad Eyes" Santos
- Alex Cox as Doyle
- Miguel Galván as Doug
- César Rodríguez as Dedo Peralta
- David Villalpando as Skinny
- Josefina Echánove as Romeo's Grandmother
- Miguel Iglesias as Danny Mestiza
- Katie Barberi as Stewardess
- Roger Cudney as Herbert
- Carlos Bardem as Reggie San Pedro

== Awards and nominations ==
| Year | Award | Category | Nominee(s) | Result | Ref. |
|---|---|---|---|---|---|
| 1998 | 12th Goya Awards | Best Production Supervision | José Luis Escolar | Won | |
| 1998 | 12th Goya Awards | Best Original Score | Simon Boswell | Nominated | |
| 1998 | 12th Goya Awards | Best Costume Design | María Estela Fernández, Glenn Ralston | Nominated | |
| 1998 | 12th Goya Awards | Best Makeup and Hairstyles | José Quetglás, Mercedes Guillot | Won | |

== Bibliography ==
- Buse, Peter; Triana Toribio, Núria; Willis, Andy (2007). The cinema of Álex de la Iglesia. Manchester and New York: Manchester University Press. ISBN 9780719071362.
