= Elliott Chaze =

American journalist

Lewis Elliott Chaze
- Born: Lewis Elliott Chaze; November 15, 1915; Mamou, Louisiana, U.S.
- Died: November 11, 1990 (aged 74); Hattiesburg, Mississippi, U.S.
- Education: University of Oklahoma
- Occupations: Novelist, journalist
- Spouse: Mary Vincent Armstrong
- Children: 5
- Writing career
- Pen name: Elliott Chaze
- Period: 1947–1986
- Genres: Mystery, crime
- Notable works: Goodbye Goliath; Black Wings Has My Angel

Lewis Elliott Chaze (November 15, 1915 – November 11, 1990) was an American journalist and novelist. He was known for his crime novels, which have been classified in the noir genre. He won the Fawcett Gold Medal Paperback Award for his third novel, Black Wings Has My Angel, which has been reprinted in three editions since the original. He was also known for essays, published in popular magazines such as Life and Redbook.

Chaze served in the military during World War II, and in the Occupation of Japan. He became a journalist, working in New Orleans and Denver before settling in Hattiesburg, Mississippi. There he wrote as a reporter and columnist for the Hattiesburg American beginning in 1951. He also served from 1970 to 1980 as its City Editor.

== Early years ==
Lewis Elliott Chaze was born to Lewis and Sue Chaze in Mamou, Louisiana. In 1932, Chaze graduated from Bolton High School in Alexandria, Louisiana. He attended Tulane University, Washington and Lee University, and graduated from the University of Oklahoma in 1937.

== Career ==
=== Military career ===
During World War II, he trained as a paratrooper and technical sergeant in the 11th Airborne Division of the U.S. Army. The war ended before he completed his training. After hostilities ended, Chaze continued to serve in the Army during the Occupation of Japan.

=== Journalist ===
Prior to World War II, Chaze began his journalism career as a reporter for the New Orleans Bureau of the Associated Press. After the war, Chaze rejoined the Associated Press (AP) in New Orleans, then transferred to the AP's Denver, Colorado bureau.

In 1951, Chaze returned to the South, settling in Hattiesburg, Mississippi, where he worked as a reporter and a columnist for the Hattiesburg American newspaper. While at the Hattiesburg American, Chase received the Hal Boyle Memorial Award for the best personal newspaper column, for his On the Lopside, which was printed in several newspapers. He was promoted to City Editor of the Hattiesburg American in 1970, and he served in that position through 1980.

Chaze also wrote articles, humorous essays, and short stories, which he published in popular magazines of the time, including Collier's, Cosmopolitan, Life, Reader's Digest, Redbook, as well as the more literary The New Yorker.

His Two Roofs and a Snake on the Door (1963), a collection of humorous essays, is considered by Marshall Keys to contain some of his best writing, in which Keys finds the "quintessential expressive detail." Many of the essays were first published in Life, where Chaze was a regular contributor in the early 1960s.

=== Novelist ===
Chaze's works of fiction drew from his own experiences. They were praised by reviewers as being authentic and filled with local color, but sometimes criticized for sensationalism. The Stainless Steel Kimono, published in 1947, was Chaze's first novel, inspired by his time in Japan during the occupation. It is about the lives of seven American paratroopers while stationed in Japan.

His most controversial novel, Tiger in the Honeysuckle (1965), was set within the Civil Rights Movement of the 1960s in a fictionalized Hattiesburg. Exploring a white Southern newspaperman immersed in the changing times, it was harshly criticized by the New York Times and the Herald Tribune, but Granville Hicks of the Saturday Review wrote that it was "a sound piece of journalistic fiction, both informative and exciting." He said that readers would likely respond based on their own positions on "the race question, not by anything inherent in the novel."

In an interview regarding his motivation for writing fiction, Chaze said: "Primarily I have a simple desire to shine my ass—to show off a bit in print." During his career, Chaze had at least ten books published, including a collection of essays. His work was rediscovered in the 1980s, when Black Wings Has My Angel was republished as One for the Money, and four of his crime novels were published for the first time.

=== Bibliography ===
- The Stainless Steel Kimono (1947)
- The Golden Tag (1950)

Republished as: Love on the Rocks (1956)

- Black Wings Has My Angel (1953)

Republished as: One for My Money (1962), One for the Money (1985)

- Tiger in the Honeysuckle (1965)
- Wettermark (1969)
- Goodbye Goliath (1983)
- Mr. Yesterday (1984)
- Little David (1985)
- The Catherine Murders (Connoisseur Crime) (1986)

=== Adaptations ===
Producer Chris Pedditto attempted to make a movie of Black Wings Has My Angel for more than 17 years, casting Tom Hiddleston and Anna Paquin as the leads at one point. The production was delayed for many years and shooting still had not begun as of 2020.

In 1990, French film director Jean-Pierre Mocky brought Black Wings Has My Angel to the screen under the title Il gèle en enfer (translation: "It's freezing in hell").

== Personal life ==
Chaze married Mary Vincent Armstrong, with whom he had five children: Mary Elliott, William, Kim, Jessica and Chris.

Chaze died from cancer at Forrest General Hospital in Hattiesburg on November 11, 1990.
