= Camilla Overbye Roos =

Danish actress (born 1969)

- Born: 19 January 1969 (age 57); Copenhagen, Denmark
- Occupation: Actress
- Years active: 1984 — 2012

Camilla Overbye Roos (born 19 January 1969) is a Danish actress. Born in Copenhagen into a family of three generations of filmmakers, she spent most of her childhood on a film studio. Always interested and observing, it soon became part of her life as well. Growing up she worked every job behind the camera as well as an actress, making her first appearance in a film at age 3. She has worked with such internationally renowned directors as Lars von Trier, David Lynch, Ridley Scott and James Cameron playing Helga in Titanic (1997).

At the age of 14, Camilla joined a travelling circus. She performed with them as a knife thrower for a year. In 1993 she was the first Dane on the cover of Life Magazine. In 2000 she started her own company, Kraka Productions, named after a Viking myth, producing and directing documentaries for BBC, Arte, USA Network, TV2, etc. In 2003 Camilla won Best Actress at the NY Independent Film Festival for her starring role in Under the Influence.
