= Barry Gifford =

American author, poet, and screenwriter (born 1946)

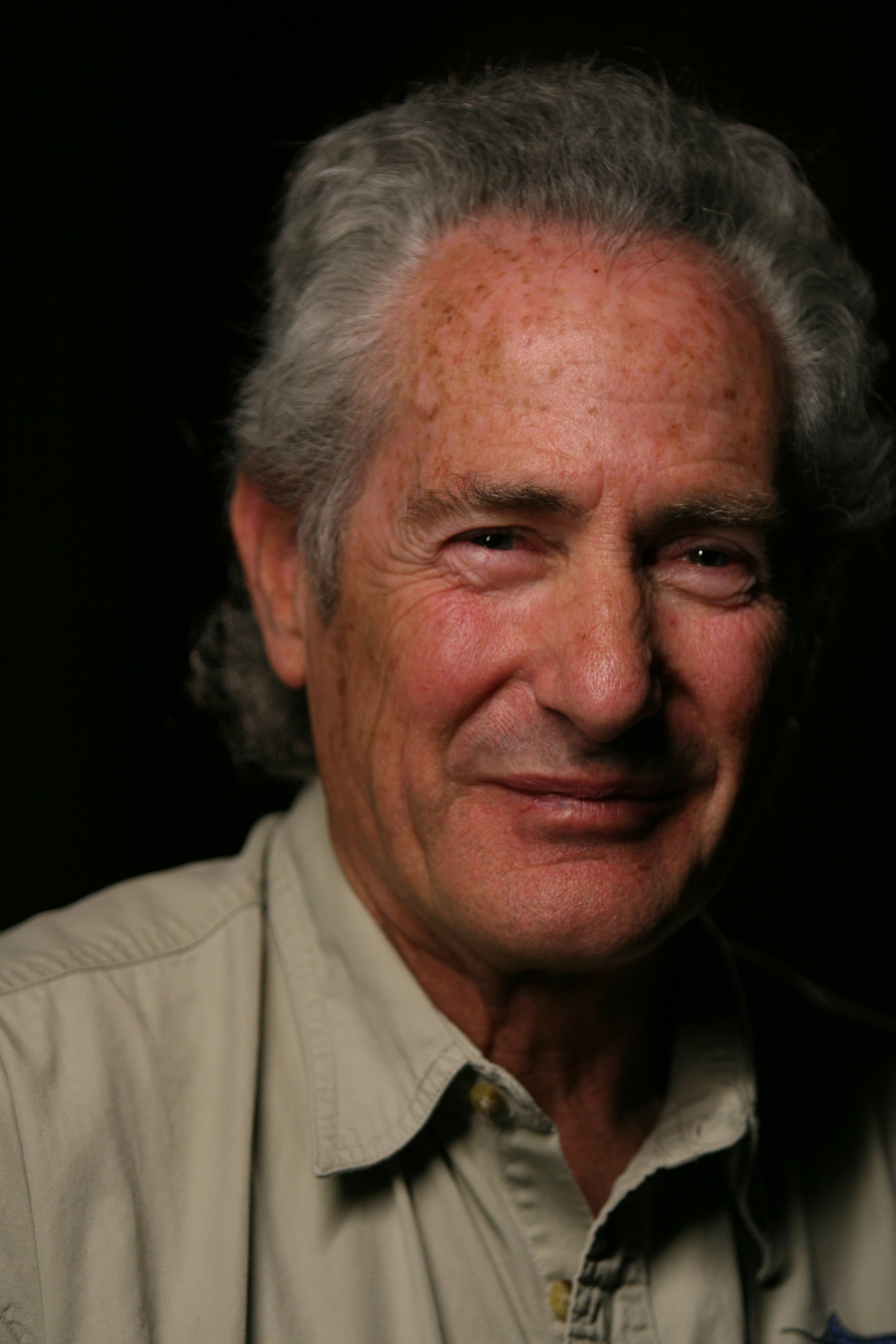
- Gifford in 2006
- Born: October 18, 1946 (age 80); Chicago, Illinois, U.S.
- Occupation: Author

Barry Gifford (born October 18, 1946) is an American author, poet, and screenwriter known for his distinctive mix of American landscapes and prose influenced by film noir and Beat Generation writers.

Gifford writes nonfiction, poetry, and is best known for his series of novels about Sailor and Lula, two star-crossed protagonists on a perpetual road trip. Published in seven novels between 1990 and 2015, the Sailor and Lula series has been described by Andrei Codrescu as written in "a great comic realist" style that explores "an unmistakably American universe [...] populated by a huge and lovable humanity propelled on a tragic river of excess energy." The first book of the series, Wild at Heart, was adapted by director David Lynch for the 1990 film of the same title. Gifford went on to co-write the original screenplay for Lost Highway (1997) with Lynch. Perdita Durango, the third book in the Sailor and Lula series, was adapted into a 1997 film by Álex de la Iglesia with a script co-written by Gifford. His most recent book, Black Sun Rising / La Corazonado, published by Seven Stories Press in 2020, is a Western noir novella that traces the struggle of the first integrated Native American tribe to establish itself in North America.

== Life and career ==
Gifford was born in a Chicago hotel room in 1946. His father was Jewish and his mother of Irish Catholic background. Gifford's father was in organized crime, and he spent his childhood largely in Chicago and New Orleans living in hotels. His childhood, as recounted in his long-running series of autobiographical tales known collectively as the Roy stories, is explored in the 2020 documentary Roy's World: Barry Gifford's Chicago. After college he joined the Air Force Reserves. After a short stint pursuing a possible career in baseball, Gifford focused on writing, both as a journalist and a poet. He lives in the San Francisco Bay Area.

Gifford's fourth novel, Wild at Heart: The Story of Sailor and Lula, caught the eye of director David Lynch, who adapted it into the screenplay and movie Wild at Heart. The movie won the Palme d'Or, the highest honor, at the Cannes Film Festival in 1990. The film's success boosted interest in Gifford's novels.

== Bibliography ==
=== Poetry ===
- The Blood of the Parade (1967)
- Coyote Tantras (1973)
- Persimmons: Poems for Paintings (1976)
- The Boy You Have Always Loved (1976)
- A Quinzaine in Return for a Portrait of Mary Sun (1977)
- Lives of the French Impressionist Painters (1978)
- Horse Hauling Timber out of Hokkaido Forest (1979)
- Beautiful Phantoms: Selected Poems 1968–1980 (1981)
- Giotto's Circle (1987)
- Ghosts No Horse Can Carry: Collected Poems 1967–1987 (1989)
- Flaubert at Key West (1994)
- Replies to Wang Wei
- Imagining Paradise: New and Selected Poems (2012)
- New York, 1960 (2016)

=== Essays and short stories ===
- A Boy's Novel (1973)
- Kerouac's Town: On the Second Anniversary of His Death. photographs by Marshall Clements. Capra Press. 1973. ISBN 978-0-912264-77-6.
- Francis Goes to the Seashore (1982)
- The Devil Thumbs a Ride and Other Unforgettable Films (1988)
- New Mysteries of Paris (1991)
- Night People (1992)
- American Falls: The Collected Short Stories
- Do the Blind Dream? (2005)
- The Roy Stories (2013)
- The Cuban Club (2017)
- Roy's World (2020)

=== Non-fiction ===
- Jack's Book: An Oral Biography of Jack Kerouac, with Lawrence Lee (1978)
- Saroyan: A Biography, with Lawrence Lee (1984)
- Day at the Races: The Education of a Racetracker
- The Devil Thumbs a Ride & Other Unforgettable Films
- The Neighborhood of Baseball: A Personal History of the Chicago Cubs
- Really the Blues (introduction)
- The Phantom Father: A Memoir
- Out of the Past: Adventures in Film Noir

=== Novels and novellas ===
- Landscape With Traveler: The Pillow Book of Francis Reeves (1980)
- Port Tropique (1980)
- Unfortunate Woman (1983)
- Wild at Heart: The Story of Sailor and Lula (1990) – Part 1 in the Sailor and Lula series
- Sailor's Holiday: The Wild Life of Sailor and Lula (1991) – Part 2 in the Sailor and Lula series
- 59° and Raining: The Story of Perdita Durango (1992) – Part 3 in the Sailor and Lula series
- A Good Man to Know: A Semi-Documentary Fictional Memoir (1992)
- Arise and Walk (1995)
- Baby Cat-Face (1995) – Sailor and Lula make a brief appearance
- Sultans of Africa – Part 4 in the Sailor and Lula series
- Consuelo's Kiss – Part 5 in the Sailor and Lula series
- The Sinaloa Story (1998)
- Wyoming (2000)
- Bad Day for the Leopard Man – Part 6 in the Sailor and Lula series
- The Stars Above Veracruz (2006)
- Imagination of the Heart (2007) – Part 7 in the Sailor and Lula series
- Memories from a Sinking Ship (2007) - Winner of the 2007 Christopher Isherwood Foundation Award for Fiction
- Sailor & Lula: The Complete Novels (2010)
- Sad Stories of the Death of Kings (2010)
- The Up-Down (2015) - A coda to the Sailor and Lula stories, documenting the last 25 years in the life of their adult son, Pace Roscoe Ripley
- Sailor & Lula, Expanded Edition (2019)
- Black Sun Rising / La Corazonado (2020)

=== Graphic novels ===
- Perdita Durango (1995)

=== Other works ===
- Read 'em and Weep
- Back in America
- Bordertown (2002)
- My Last Martini
- The Rooster Trapped in the Reptile Room: A Barry Gifford Reader
- Rosa Blanca
- Hotel Room Trilogy
- Immortality (co-writer)

== Filmography ==
- Wild at Heart (1990) (based on a novel by Barry Gifford)
- Hotel Room (1993) (screenplay, episodes "Blackout" and "Tricks")
- Lost Highway (1997) (screenplay with David Lynch)
- Perdita Durango (1997) (screenplay with David Trueba, Álex de la Iglesia, and Jorge Guerricaechevarría)
- City of Ghosts (2002) (screenplay with Matt Dillon and Mike Jones)
- The Phantom Father (2011), Barry Gifford as Jack; (based on a story by Barry Gifford)
- You Can't Win (2026) (screenplay with Robinson Devor, Michael Pitt, and Charles Mudede)
- Tropico (TBA) (screenplay)
