= Wild at Heart (novel) =

1990 novel by Barry Gifford

- Author: Barry Gifford
- Language: English
- Genre: Fiction
- Publication date: 1989
- Publication place: United States

Wild at Heart: The Story of Sailor and Lula is a 1989 novel by Barry Gifford.

== Critical reception ==
Publishers Weekly wrote: "In the visual equivalent of sound bites, novelist and poet Gifford ... cuts to the heart with sharply focused shots of young lovers on the lam." Kirkus Reviews wrote that "Gifford's South is ersatz, tarred up with Forget-Me-Not Cafes and Dixie beer, his Romeo and Juliet more treacly than tragic."

== Series ==
Wild at Heart: The Story of Sailor and Lula begins the adventures of two sex-driven, star-crossed protagonists, Sailor and Lula, on the road in the American South.

It is followed by:

- 59° and Raining: The Story of Perdita Durango
- Sailor’s Holiday
- Sultans of Africa
- Consuelo's Kiss
- Bad Day for the Leopard Man
- Imagination of the Heart

== Film ==
The novel was adapted to the film Wild At Heart (1990) written and directed by David Lynch and starring Nicolas Cage, Laura Dern and Willem Dafoe. The adaptation won the Palme d'Or, the highest honor at the Cannes Film Festival. The success of the film boosted interest in Gifford's novels.
