= Clarion Ledger =

Newspaper in Jackson, Mississippi, US

- Type: Daily newspaper
- Format: Broadsheet
- Owner: USA Today Co.
- Founded: 1837
- Language: English (American dialect)
- Headquarters: 201 South Congress Street; Jackson, MS 39201
- Circulation: 15,500 Daily; 16,422 Sunday
- Price: Mon.-Sat., $2 & Sun./Thanksgiving Day, $3 (in MS)
- ISSN: 0744-9526
- OCLC number: 8674244
- Website: clarionledger.com

The Clarion Ledger is an American daily newspaper in Jackson, Mississippi. Before being sold to Gannett in 1982, its publisher was the second-oldest company in the state of Mississippi, and it is one of the few newspapers in the nation that continues to circulate statewide. It is an operating division of Gannett River States Publishing Corporation, owned by USA Today Co.

== History ==
The paper traces its roots to The Eastern Clarion, founded in Jasper County, Mississippi, in 1837. Later that year, it was sold and moved to Meridian, Mississippi.

After the American Civil War, it was moved to Jackson, the capital, and merged with The Standard. It soon became known as The Clarion.

In 1888, The Clarion merged with the State Ledger and became known as the Daily Clarion-Ledger.

Four employees who were displaced by the merger founded their own newspaper, The Jackson Evening Post, in 1892. One of those four was Walter Giles Johnson, Sr. He survived the other three to grow the paper later known as the "Jackson Daily News". Johnson served as General Manager and Publisher alongside Editor Frederick Sullens until his death in October 1947. His son Walter Giles Johnson, Jr. assumed the duties of General Manager.

In 1907, Fred Sullens purchased an interest in the competing The Jackson Evening Post. He soon changed the name to the Jackson Daily News, keeping it as an evening newspaper.

Thomas and Robert Hederman bought the Daily Clarion-Ledger in 1920 and dropped "Daily" from its masthead.

On August 24, 1937, The Clarion-Ledger and Jackson Daily News incorporated under a charter issued to Mississippi Publishers Corporation for the purpose of selling joint advertising.

On August 7, 1954, the Jackson Daily News sold out to its rival, The Clarion-Ledger, for $2,250,000. This was despite a recent court ruling that blocked The Clarion-Ledger owners from controlling both papers. The Hederman family consolidated the two newspaper plants.

In 1982, the Hedermans sold the Clarion-Ledger and Daily News to Gannett, ending 60 years of family ownership. Gannett merged the two papers into a single morning paper under the Clarion-Ledger masthead, with the Clarion-Ledger incorporating features of the Daily News. The purchase of both papers by Gannett essentially created a daily newspaper monopoly in Central Mississippi (Gannett also owns the Hattiesburg American in Hattiesburg, Mississippi), which still operates.

Starting Monday, Dec. 4, 2023, the newspaper switched from carrier to mail delivery through the U.S. Postal Service.

== Civil rights ==
Historically, both newspapers, The Clarion-Ledger and the Jackson Daily News, were openly and unashamedly racist, supporting white supremacy.

In 1890, after Mississippi Democrats adopted a new state constitution designed to disenfranchise black voters by making voter registration and voting more difficult, The Clarion-Ledger applauded the move, stating:

"Do not object to negroes voting on account of ignorance, but on account of color. ... If every negro in Mississippi was a class graduate of Harvard, and had been elected class orator ... he would not be as well fitted to exercise the rights of suffrage as the Anglo-Saxon farm laborer."

In August 1963, when 200,000 people joined the March on Washington for Jobs and Freedom, and Martin Luther King Jr. gave his now-famous "I Have A Dream" speech, The Clarion-Ledger made short note of the rally. It reported the litter-clearance effort the next day under the headline, "Washington is Clean Again with Negro Trash Removed".

Earlier that year, when the Mississippi State University basketball team was scheduled to play the Loyola University Chicago Ramblers in the NCAA tournament, they learned that its starting lineup featured four African-American players. The Jackson Daily News prominently featured pictures of the four black players in an effort to scare the Bulldogs from playing the Ramblers. At the time, longstanding state policy forbade state collegiate athletic teams from playing in integrated events. The ploy backfired, as the Bulldogs ignored the threat and defied an order from Governor Ross Barnett to withdraw. Their competition with the Ramblers, the eventual national champion that year, is a significant, but often overlooked, milestone of progress in race relations in sports.

The paper often referred to civil rights activists as "communists" and "chimpanzees." The paper's racism was so virulent that some in the African-American community called it "The Klan-Ledger", after the Ku Klux Klan.

When violence, aided by such rabble-rousing, took place in Mississippi, the paper sought to put the blame somewhere else. When Byron De La Beckwith was arrested for killing NAACP leader Medgar Evers, the headline read, "Californian Is Charged With Murder Of Evers", overlooking the fact that Beckwith had lived in Mississippi almost his entire life.

In the mid-1970s, Rea S. Hederman, the third generation of his family to run the paper, made a concerted effort to atone for its terrible civil rights record. Hederman expanded the staff and new budget. Editors began to pursue promising young reporters, including from other states. To help rehabilitate the paper's image among blacks, who gradually became a majority of Jackson's population, the paper increased coverage of blacks and increased the number of its black staff.

When Gannett bought the newspaper, the new leadership ramped up efforts to purge the paper's segregationist legacy. Gannett has long been well known for promoting diversity in the newsroom and covering events in communities of racial and ethnic minorities. By 1991, the Clarion-Ledger's number of newsroom black professionals was three times the national average, and the paper had one of the few black managing editors in the U.S.

Ronnie Agnew became the Managing Editor in February 2001. In October 2002, he became the paper's first black Executive Editor.

== Awards and recognition ==
In 1983, The Clarion-Ledger won the coveted Pulitzer Prize for Public Service for a package of stories on Mississippi's education system.
